= 1985–86 Hartford Whalers season =

National Hockey League team season

1985–86 Hartford Whalers
- Division: 4th Adams
- Conference: 7th Wales
- 1985–86 record: 40–36–4
- Home record: 21–17–2
- Road record: 19–19–2
- Goals for: 332
- Goals against: 302

Team information
- General manager: Emile Francis
- Coach: Jack Evans
- Captain: Ron Francis
- Arena: Hartford Civic Center
- Average attendance: 12,769 (84.4%)
- Minor league affiliates: Binghamton Whalers (AHL); Salt Lake Golden Eagles (IHL)

Team leaders
- Goals: Sylvain Turgeon (45)
- Assists: Ron Francis (53)
- Points: Sylvain Turgeon (79)
- Penalty minutes: Torrie Robertson (358)
- Plus/minus: Joel Quenneville (+23)
- Wins: Mike Liut (27)
- Goals against average: Mike Liut (3.61)

The 1985–86 Hartford Whalers season saw the Whalers finish in fourth place in the Adams Division with a record of 40 wins, 36 losses, and 4 ties for 84 points. They beat the Quebec Nordiques in the Adams Division Semifinals in three games, for their first and only playoff series victory in franchise history. They lost the Adams Division Finals in seven games to the Montreal Canadiens. Because the Whalers made it to the Adams Division Finals, the 1985–86 season is considered by many to be the most successful in Whalers history.

== Offseason ==
At the 1985 NHL entry draft held at Maple Leaf Gardens in Toronto, the Hartford Whalers selected defenseman Dana Murzyn from the Calgary Wranglers of the WHL with their first round, fifth overall draft pick. In 72 games with the Wranglers, Murzyn scored 32 goals, 92 points and accumulated 233 penalty minutes during the 1984–85 season. In eight playoff games, Murzyn had a goal and 12 points. Some other notable picks by the Whalers included goaltender Kay Whitmore from the Peterborough Petes in the second round, and right winger Shane Churla from the Medicine Hat Tigers in the sixth round.

On September 19, the Whalers signed free agent center John Newberry. In 16 games with the Montreal Canadiens during the 1984–85 season, Newberry had four assists. With the Sherbrooke Canadiens of the AHL, Newberry scored 23 goals and 63 points in 58 games.

Hartford acquired defenseman Tim Bothwell in a trade with the St. Louis Blues on October 4, as the Whalers sent cash to the Blues to complete the trade. Bothwell scored four goals and 26 points in 79 with the Blues during the 1984–85 season. He also had a +27 rating, and over the past two seasons, Bothwell was a +49.

Three days later, on October 7, Hartford traded defenseman Chris Kotsopoulos to the Toronto Maple Leafs in exchange for left winger Stew Gavin. Gavin scored 12 goals and 25 points in 73 games with Toronto in 1984–85. In 268 career games to date, Gavin scored 34 goals and 82 points since beginning his career in the 1980–81 season.

== Draft picks ==
Below are the Hartford Whalers' selections at the 1985 NHL entry draft, which were held on June 15, 1985. It was held at the Metro Toronto Convention Centre in Toronto.

Round	#	Player	Pos.	Nationality	College/junior/club team (League)
1	5	Dana Murzyn	D	Canada	Calgary Wranglers (WHL)
2	26	Kay Whitmore	G	Canada	Peterborough Petes (OHL)
4	68	Gary Callaghan	C	Canada	Belleville Bulls (OHL)
6	110	Shane Churla	RW	Canada	Medicine Hat Tigers (WHL)
7	131	Chris Brant	LW	Canada	Sault Ste. Marie Greyhounds (OHL)
8	152	Brian Puhalski	LW	Canada	Notre Dame Hounds (SJHL)
9	173	Greg Dornbach	C	United States	Miami University (CCHA)
10	194	Paul Tory	RW	Canada	University of Illinois at Chicago (CCHA)
11	215	Jerry Pawloski	D	United States	Harvard University (ECAC)
12	236	Bruce Hill	LW	Canada	University of Denver (WCHA)

== Roster ==
1985–86 Hartford Whalers
Roster
No.	Nat	Player	Pos	S/G	Age	Acquired	Birthplace
20	(Canada)	John Anderson	LW	L/–	28	1986	Toronto
44	(Canada)	Dave Babych	D	L/–	24	1985	Edmonton, Alberta
17	(Canada)	Wayne Babych	RW	R/–	27	1986	Edmonton, Alberta
24	(Canada)	Tim Bothwell	D	L/–	30	1985	Vancouver
34	(United States)	Jack Brownschidle	D	L/–	30	1983	Buffalo, New York
21	(Canada)	Sylvain Côté	D	R/–	20	1984	Quebec City, Quebec
25	(Canada)	Bob Crawford	RW	R/–	26	1983	Belleville, Ontario
11	(Canada)	Kevin Dineen	RW	R/–	22	1984	Quebec City, Quebec
12	(Canada)	Dean Evason	C	R/–	21	1984	Flin Flon, Manitoba
29	(United States)	Paul Fenton	LW	L/–	26	1984	Springfield, Massachusetts
26	(Canada)	Ray Ferraro	C	L/–	21	1982	Trail, British Columbia
10	(Canada)	Ron Francis (C)	C	L/–	22	1981	Sault Ste. Marie, Ontario
14	(Canada)	Bill Gardner	C	L/–	25	1985	Toronto
7	(Canada)	Stew Gavin	RW	R/–	25	1985	Ottawa, Ontario
20	(Canada)	Mike Hoffman	LW	L/–	22	1981	Cambridge, Ontario
27	(Canada)	Doug Jarvis	C	L/–	30	1985	Peterborough, Ontario
18	(United States)	Scot Kleinendorst	D	L/–	26	1984	Grand Rapids, Minnesota
28	(Canada)	Paul Lawless	LW	L/–	21	1982	Scarborough, Ontario
1	(Canada)	Mike Liut	G	–/L	30	1985	Weston, Ontario
23	(Canada)	Paul MacDermid	RW	R/–	22	1981	Chesley, Ontario
14	(Canada)	Greg Malone	C	L/–	29	1985	Fredericton, New Brunswick
25	(Canada)	Mike McEwen	D	L/–	29	1985	Hornepayne, Ontario
4	(Canada)	Dana Murzyn	D	L/–	19	1985	Calgary, Alberta
17	(Canada)	Ray Neufeld	RW	R/–	26	1979	Saint Boniface, Manitoba
33	(Canada)	John Newberry	C	L/–	23	1985	Port Alberni, British Columbia
6	(Canada)	Mark Paterson	D	L/–	21	1982	Ottawa, Ontario
22	(Sweden)	Jörgen Pettersson	LW	L/–	29	1985	Gothenburg, Sweden
3	(Canada)	Joel Quenneville	D	L/–	27	1983	Windsor, Ontario
32	(Canada)	Torrie Robertson	LW	L/–	24	1983	Victoria, British Columbia
5	(Sweden)	Ulf Samuelsson	D	L/–	21	1982	Fagerstad, Sweden
38	(Canada)	Brad Shaw	D	R/–	21	1985	Cambridge, Ontario
8	(Finland)	Risto Siltanen	D	R/–	27	1982	Tampere, Finland
15	(Canada)	Dave Tippett	LW	L/–	24	1983	Moosomin, Saskatchewan
16	(Canada)	Sylvain Turgeon	LW	L/–	21	1983	Noranda, Quebec
31	(Canada)	Steve Weeks	G	–/L	27	1984	Scarborough, Ontario
20	(Canada)	Mike Zuke	C	R/–	31	1983	Sault Ste. Marie, Ontario
Head coach
Jack Evans
Assistant Coach
Claude Larose
Head Trainer
Tom Woodcock
Assistant Trainer Equipment Manager
Skip Cunningham

== Regular season ==
=== October ===
Hartford began the 1985–86 season on the road against the Buffalo Sabres on October 10. The Whalers, led by two goals by Kevin Dineen, overcame a 3–0 deficit to defeat the Sabres 5–4. Two nights later, on October 12, the Whalers hosted the New York Rangers for their home opener, and were led by two goals by Ron Francis and Ray Ferraro, as well as 33 saves by Mike Liut, as Hartford defeated New York 8–2 in front of 15,142 fans at the Civic Center.

The Whalers dropped their next game to the Quebec Nordiques, however, they would win their following two games, including a wild 11–6 victory over the Montreal Canadiens, to open the season 4–1–0. Hartford then began a four-game road trip, in which they dropped their first three games before salvaging a victory over the Pittsburgh Penguins, bringing their record to 5–4–0.

In their final game of the month, Hartford defeated the Quebec Nordiques on home ice, finishing October with a 6–4–0 record, as they earned 12 points. The Whalers sat in third place in the Adams Division, five points behind the first place Quebec Nordiques.

=== November ===
Hartford got off to a tough start in November, losing their first three games, including blowout losses of 8–1 to the Los Angeles Kings and 8–3 to the Montreal Canadiens. The Whalers ended their losing streak with a 4–3 win over the Quebec Nordiques as they stormed back from a 3–0 third period deficit to take the victory.

The Whalers won their next game against the Minnesota North Stars, however, this followed by another three game losing skid, dropping the Whalers to a record of 8–10–0 and falling into last place in the Adams Division. On November 21, the Whalers acquired defenseman Dave Babych from the Winnipeg Jets in exchange for right winger Ray Neufeld. Babych had four goals and 16 points in 19 games with the Jets at the time of the trade. A high-scoring defenseman, Babych had recorded at least 60 points in three of his four previous seasons, including 74 points in 79 games with Winnipeg in 1982–83.

The trade sparked the Whalers to a huge 8–1 win over the Winnipeg Jets on November 23, as Ron Francis led the way with a hat trick. In their next game, the Whalers shutout the Los Angeles Kings 9–0, as Mike Liut earned the shutout with 30 saves.

The Whalers won their third game in row on November 29, defeating the Vancouver Canucks 5–4, however, the Edmonton Oilers snapped the Whalers winning streak the next night, as they defeated Hartford 8–5.

Hartford struggled to a 5–7–0 record in November, dropping their overall record to 11–11–0 through their first 22 games. The Whalers were in last place in the Adams Division, three points behind the Montreal Canadiens for the final playoff spot.

=== December ===
The Whalers opened December the same way they closed November, as Hartford lost by a score of 8–5, this time to the Calgary Flames, on December 4. Two days later, Hartford acquired center Doug Jarvis from the Washington Capitals for left winger Jörgen Pettersson. Jarvis, who began his NHL career with the Montreal Canadiens in the 1975–76 season, had never missed a game in his career, as he had played in 825 games in a row at the time of the trade. Jarvis was a four time Stanley Cup champion with the Canadiens, winning the Cup in 1976, 1977, 1978, and 1979. He was traded to the Washington Capitals prior to the 1982–83 season, and won the Selke Trophy in 1984. Jarvis had a goal and three points in 25 games with Washington to begin the 1985–86 season.

In their next six games after the trade, the Whalers posted a record of 4–1–1 to climb over the .500 mark with an overall record of 15–13–1, pulling the Whalers within one point of the Buffalo Sabres for the fourth and final playoff position in the Adams Division.

Hartford dropped two of their final three games before Christmas, however, the Whalers rebounded by winning their first three games after the Christmas break, before dropping their final game of December.

The Whalers posted a record of 8–5–1 record during December, bringing their overall record to 19–16–1 through 36 games. The Whalers were tied with the Buffalo Sabres for the fourth and final playoff spot in the Adams Division. They were also only three points behind the first place Montreal Canadiens, as three points separated first and last place in the division.

=== January ===
Hartford dropped their first two games on January, losing to the Quebec Nordiques and Edmonton Oilers, bringing their overall losing streak to three games. The Whalers ended their losing skid with a 9–1 win over the Calgary Flames, as Dean Evason and Kevin Dineen each scored hat tricks in the victory. Hartford won their next game against the Vancouver Canucks, before dropping two in a row.

On January 17, the Whalers acquired Wayne Babych, the older brother of Whalers defenseman Dave Babych, from the Quebec Nordiques, in exchange for Greg Malone. Babych, who was acquired by Quebec from the Pittsburgh Penguins earlier in the season, had six goals and 11 points in 15 games with the Nordiques. His best season came in 1980–81, while as a member of the St. Louis Blues, Babych scored 54 goals and 96 points in 78 games. During that season, he led the NHL with 40 even strength goals.

The trade marked the beginning of a five-game winning streak, as that evening, the Whalers defeated the Quebec Nordiques 11–6. On January 21, the Whalers shutout the New York Rangers 5–0, as Steve Weeks stopped all 19 shots he faced.

The Whalers winning streak came to an end on January 27, as the Boston Bruins defeated Hartford 6–3. Two nights later, in the Whalers final game of the month, the club lost to the Boston Bruins 5–4 in overtime.

Hartford earned a record of 7–6–0 during January, which was their second consecutive winning month of the season. Their overall record at the end of January was 26–22–1, as the club had 53 points and sat in the fourth and final playoff spot in the Adams Division, two points ahead of the fifth place Buffalo Sabres.

=== February ===
The Whalers continued their winless skid into February, as Hartford began February with a 0–7–1 record in their first eight games, bringing their overall winless skid to 10 games (0–9–1). During this slump, the club acquired center Bill Gardner from the Chicago Black Hawks in exchange for a third round draft pick in the 1987 NHL entry draft. Gardner scored three goals and 13 points in 46 games with Chicago during the 1985–86 season.

The winless skid dropped the Whalers overall record to 26–29–2 following their 4–1 loss to the Minnesota North Stars on February 15. This dropped the club into last place in the Adams Division, six points behind the fourth place Buffalo Sabres.

On February 18, the Whalers earned their first win of February, a 5–4 victory over the Vancouver Canucks. The next night, the Whalers defeated the Buffalo Sabres 6–4, bringing their winning streak to two games. This came to an abrupt end, as Hartford lost their remaining three games of February.

The Whalers posted a record of 2–10–1 during February, dropping their overall record to 28–32–2. The club had earned 59 points and sat in last place, six points behind the Buffalo Sabres for the final playoff position in the Adams Division.

=== March/April ===
Hartford opened March with another loss, as the Pittsburgh Penguins defeated Hartford 8–2 on March 1, extending their losing streak to four games. Hartford broke out of their slump, by winning their next three games, including two over the Buffalo Sabres, to improve their record to 31–33–2, cutting the Sabres lead to four points.

On March 8, the Whalers acquired right winger John Anderson from the Quebec Nordiques for defenseman Risto Siltanen. Anderson had 21 goals and 49 points in 65 games with the Nordiques in 1985–86, his first season with the club. He previously appeared in 534 games with the Toronto Maple Leafs from 1977 to 1985, scoring 189 goals and 393 points with the Maple Leafs. That evening, the Whalers, despite an assist from Anderson, lost to the Nordiques 6–3, ending their winning streak at three games.

Following a 5–2 win over the Montreal Canadiens on March 10, the Whalers acquired defenseman Mike McEwen from the New York Rangers for right winger Bob Crawford. McEwen was acquired by New York from the Detroit Red Wings earlier in the season, and between the two clubs, he two goals and 17 points in 45 games. McEwen was a member of the New York Islanders from 1980 to 1984, winning three Stanley Cup championships in 1981, 1982, and 1983.

On March 13, the New York Islanders defeated Hartford 5–2, dropping the Whalers record to 32–35–2, as Hartford was now six points behind the Buffalo Sabres for the final playoff position. On March 15, the Whalers crushed the Chicago Black Hawks 11–4, which began an eight-game unbeaten streak in which the Whalers earned a record of 6–0–2. On April 1, the Whalers met the Buffalo Sabres, with both teams tied for fourth place in the Adams Division. After Ray Ferraro gave the Whalers a 1–0 lead, the Sabres scored three in a row, taking a 3–1 lead in the second period. Hartford, clinging onto their playoff hopes, scored four goals in a row, including two goals by Kevin Dineen, to defeat the Sabres 5–3 and take over fourth place.

The Whalers ended the season with two wins in their final three games to clinch the fourth and final playoff position in the Adams Division. The club earned a record of 12–4–2 in their final 18 games, bringing their overall record to 40–36–4. The 40 victories and 84 points were franchise records, breaking the previous record of 30 wins set in 1984–85, and 73 points set in their inaugural season in 1979–80. This ended the Whalers five year playoff drought, as the club clinched their first playoff berth since 1980.

=== Season standings ===
Adams Division
	GP	W	L	T	GF	GA	Pts
**Quebec Nordiques**	80	43	31	6	330	289	92
**Montreal Canadiens**	80	40	33	7	330	280	87
**Boston Bruins**	80	37	31	12	311	288	86
**Hartford Whalers**	80	40	36	4	332	302	84
Buffalo Sabres	80	37	37	6	296	291	80

Note: GP = Games played, W = Wins, L = Losses, T = Ties, Pts = Points, GF = Goals for, GA = Goals against
Note: Teams that qualified for the playoffs are highlighted in bold.

=== Record vs opponents ===
Adams Division record vs. opponents

==== Vs. Wales Conference ====
**Vs. Adams Division**

1985–86 NHL records
Team	**BOS**	**BUF**	**HFD**	**MTL**	**QUE**	**Total**
Boston	—	3–3–2	4–3–1	3–4–1	1–5–2	**11–15–6**
Buffalo	3–3–2	—	2–6	3–5	4–4	**12–18–2**
Hartford	3–4–1	6–2	—	3–4–1	4–4	**16–14–2**
Montreal	4–3–1	5–3	4–3−1	—	2–6	**15–15–2**
Quebec	5–1–2	4–4	4–4	6–2	—	**19–11–2**

**Vs. Patrick Division**

1985–86 NHL records
Team	**NJD**	**NYI**	**NYR**	**PHI**	**PIT**	**WSH**	**Total**
Boston	3–0	0–1–2	1–2	1–2	2–1	0–2–1	**7–8–3**
Buffalo	2–1	2–1	3–0	2–1	0–2–1	1–1–1	**10–6–2**
Hartford	2–1	1–2	2–1	0–3	2–1	0–2–1	**7–10–1**
Montreal	2–1	2–1	0–2–1	1–2	2–0–1	0–2–1	**7–8–3**
Quebec	1–2	2–1	2–0–1	1–1–1	1–1–1	0–3	**7–8–3**

==== Vs. Campbell Conference ====
**Vs. Norris Division**

1985–86 NHL records
Team	**CHI**	**DET**	**MIN**	**STL**	**TOR**	**Total**
Boston	1–2	2–1	3–0	1–2	2–0–1	**9–5–1**
Buffalo	1–2	1–1–1	2–1	2–1	1–2	**7–7–1**
Hartford	1–2	2–1	1–2	1–1–1	3–0	**8–6–1**
Montreal	2–0–1	3–0	1–1–1	1–2	2–1	**9–4–2**
Quebec	2–1	2–1	2–1	1–2	3–0	**10–5–0**

**Vs. Smythe Division**

1985–86 NHL records
Team	**CGY**	**EDM**	**LAK**	**VAN**	**WIN**	**Total**
Boston	2–1	1–2	3–0	1–0–2	3–0	**10–3–2**
Buffalo	1–1–1	2–1	1–2	2–1	2–1	**8–6–1**
Hartford	2–1	0–3	2–1	3–0	2–1	**9–6–0**
Montreal	2–1	0–3	2–1	3–0	2–1	**9–6–0**
Quebec	2–1	1–2	2–1	1–1–1	1–2	**7–7–1**

== Schedule and results ==
=== Regular season ===
1985–86 regular season: 40–36–4 (home: 21–17–2; road: 19–19–2)
October: 6–4–0 (home: 3–0–0; road: 3–4–0)

Game	Date	Opponent	Score	OT	Decision	Location	Attendance	Record	Points	Recap
1	October 10, 1985	@ Buffalo Sabres	5–4		Liut	Buffalo Memorial Auditorium	12,278	1–0–0	2	
2	October 12, 1985	New York Rangers	8–2		Liut	Hartford Civic Center	15,142	2–0–0	4	
3	October 15, 1985	@ Quebec Nordiques	1–4		Liut	Quebec Coliseum	12,666	2–1–0	4	
4	October 17, 1985	@ New Jersey Devils	4–3	OT	Weeks	Brendan Byrne Arena	7,962	3–1–0	6	
5	October 19, 1985	Montreal Canadiens	11–6		Liut	Hartford Civic Center	13,048	4–1–0	8	
6	October 23, 1985	@ Chicago Black Hawks	2–9		Liut	Chicago Stadium	14,971	4–2–0	8	
7	October 24, 1985	@ Philadelphia Flyers	0–3		Weeks	The Spectrum	17,053	4–3–0	8	
8	October 26, 1985	@ Montreal Canadiens	3–5		Liut	Montreal Forum	16,735	4–4–0	8	
9	October 29, 1985	@ Pittsburgh Penguins	4–3		Liut	Pittsburgh Civic Arena	6,793	5–4–0	10	
10	October 30, 1985	Quebec Nordiques	6–4		Weeks	Hartford Civic Center	11,014	6–4–0	12	

November: 5–7–0 (home: 2–4–0; road: 3–3–0)

Game	Date	Opponent	Score	OT	Decision	Location	Attendance	Record	Points	Recap
11	November 2, 1985	Los Angeles Kings	1–8		Weeks	Hartford Civic Center	12,024	6–5–0	12	
12	November 5, 1985	Montreal Canadiens	3–8		Liut	Hartford Civic Center	10,820	6–6–0	12	
13	November 7, 1985	@ Boston Bruins	1–2		Weeks	Boston Garden	12,787	6–7–0	12	
14	November 9, 1985	@ Quebec Nordiques	4–3		Liut	Quebec Coliseum	14,552	7–7–0	14	
15	November 13, 1985	Minnesota North Stars	5–2		Liut	Hartford Civic Center	9,732	8–7–0	16	
16	November 16, 1985	Philadelphia Flyers	2–5		Weeks	Hartford Civic Center	15,142	8–8–0	16	
17	November 19, 1985	Buffalo Sabres	0–2		Liut	Hartford Civic Center	10,027	8–9–0	16	
18	November 21, 1985	@ Philadelphia Flyers	0–3		Liut	The Spectrum	17,211	8–10–0	16	
19	November 23, 1985	Winnipeg Jets	8–1		Liut	Hartford Civic Center	11,957	9–10–0	18	
20	November 27, 1985	@ Los Angeles Kings	9–0		Liut	The Forum	8,888	10–10–0	20	
21	November 29, 1985	@ Vancouver Canucks	5–4		Liut	Pacific Coliseum	9,276	11–10–0	22	
22	November 30, 1985	@ Edmonton Oilers	5–8		Weeks	Northlands Coliseum	17,304	11–11–0	22	

December: 8–5–1 (home: 5–2–0; road: 3–3–1)

Game	Date	Opponent	Score	OT	Decision	Location	Attendance	Record	Points	Recap
23	December 4, 1985	@ Calgary Flames	5–8		Liut	Olympic Saddledome	16,672	11–12–0	22	
24	December 7, 1985	Boston Bruins	7–2		Liut	Hartford Civic Center	15,126	12–12–0	24	
25	December 11, 1985	Montreal Canadiens	1–3		Liut	Hartford Civic Center	11,262	12–13–0	24	
26	December 13, 1985	@ Buffalo Sabres	6–4		Liut	Buffalo Memorial Auditorium	11,519	13–13–0	26	
27	December 14, 1985	Pittsburgh Penguins	5–4		Liut	Hartford Civic Center	10,938	14–13–0	28	
28	December 16, 1985	@ Montreal Canadiens	4–4	OT	Liut	Montreal Forum	16,296	14–13–1	29	
29	December 18, 1985	Calgary Flames	4–3		Weeks	Hartford Civic Center	9,929	15–13–1	31	
30	December 19, 1985	@ Boston Bruins	1–2		Liut	Boston Garden	10,244	15–14–1	31	
31	December 21, 1985	New Jersey Devils	7–6		Liut	Hartford Civic Center	11,229	16–14–1	33	
32	December 23, 1985	New York Islanders	3–6		Liut	Hartford Civic Center	14,263	16–15–1	33	
33	December 26, 1985	@ New York Islanders	4–3		Weeks	Nassau Coliseum	16,152	17–15–1	35	
34	December 28, 1985	@ Toronto Maple Leafs	6–3		Weeks	Maple Leaf Gardens	16,285	18–15–1	37	
35	December 29, 1985	Detroit Red Wings	5–2		Liut	Hartford Civic Center	12,762	19–15–1	39	
36	December 31, 1985	@ Quebec Nordiques	1–5		Weeks	Quebec Coliseum	13,644	19–16–1	39	

January: 7–6–0 (home: 3–3–0; road: 4–3–0)

Game	Date	Opponent	Score	OT	Decision	Location	Attendance	Record	Points	Recap
37	January 2, 1986	Quebec Nordiques	2–3		Liut	Hartford Civic Center	11,664	19–17–1	39	
38	January 4, 1986	@ Edmonton Oilers	3–4		Liut	Northlands Coliseum	17,282	19–18–1	39	
39	January 7, 1986	@ Calgary Flames	9–1		Weeks	Olympic Saddledome	16,762	20–18–1	41	
40	January 10, 1986	@ Vancouver Canucks	4–3		Liut	Pacific Coliseum	9,539	21–18–1	43	
41	January 12, 1986	@ Chicago Black Hawks	2–4		Weeks	Chicago Stadium	17,301	21–19–1	43	
42	January 15, 1986	Edmonton Oilers	1–4		Liut	Hartford Civic Center	15,126	21–20–1	43	
43	January 17, 1986	Quebec Nordiques	11–6		Weeks	Hartford Civic Center	12,486	22–20–1	45	
44	January 18, 1986	@ Quebec Nordiques	11–6		Liut	Quebec Coliseum	15,012	23–20–1	47	
45	January 20, 1986	@ New York Rangers	5–0		Weeks	Madison Square Garden	17,419	24–20–1	49	
46	January 23, 1986	Toronto Maple Leafs	4–1		Liut	Hartford Civic Center	12,035	25–20–1	51	
47	January 25, 1986	Winnipeg Jets	7–2		Weeks	Hartford Civic Center	12,471	26–20–1	53	
48	January 27, 1986	@ Boston Bruins	3–6		Liut	Boston Garden	10,496	26–21–1	53	
49	January 29, 1986	Boston Bruins	4–5	OT	Weeks	Hartford Civic Center	14,756	26–22–1	53	

February: 2–10–1 (home: 1–6–0; road: 1–4–1)

Game	Date	Opponent	Score	OT	Decision	Location	Attendance	Record	Points	Recap
50	February 1, 1986	New York Rangers	1–3		Liut	Hartford Civic Center	15,126	26–23–1	53	
51	February 2, 1986	Washington Capitals	4–5		Liut	Hartford Civic Center	12,473	26–24–1	53	
38th All-Star Game in Hartford, Connecticut
52	February 6, 1986	@ Detroit Red Wings	3–4	OT	Liut	Joe Louis Arena	16,758	26–25–1	53	
53	February 8, 1986	Buffalo Sabres	2–4		Liut	Hartford Civic Center	14,088	26–26–1	53	
54	February 9, 1986	New Jersey Devils	3–6		Weeks	Hartford Civic Center	10,609	26–27–1	53	
55	February 11, 1986	@ St. Louis Blues	4–4	OT	Liut	St. Louis Arena	10,877	26–27–2	54	
56	February 14, 1986	@ Winnipeg Jets	4–5		Weeks	Winnipeg Arena	14,620	26–28–2	54	
57	February 15, 1986	@ Minnesota North Stars	1–4		Weeks	Met Center	12,726	26–29–2	54	
58	February 18, 1986	Vancouver Canucks	5–4		Weeks	Hartford Civic Center	10,812	27–29–2	56	
59	February 19, 1986	@ Buffalo Sabres	6–4		Liut	Buffalo Memorial Auditorium	15,624	28–29–2	58	
60	February 22, 1986	@ Montreal Canadiens	3–6		Liut	Montreal Forum	17,671	28–30–2	58	
61	February 23, 1986	St. Louis Blues	2–8		Liut	Hartford Civic Center	12,117	28–31–2	58	
62	February 26, 1986	Minnesota North Stars	2–5		Liut	Hartford Civic Center	11,042	28–32–2	58	

March: 9–3–2 (home: 5–2–2; road: 4–1–0)

Game	Date	Opponent	Score	OT	Decision	Location	Attendance	Record	Points	Recap
63	March 1, 1986	@ Pittsburgh Penguins	1–5		Weeks	Pittsburgh Civic Arena	16,033	28–33–2	58	L4
64	March 2, 1986	Boston Bruins	4–1		Liut	Hartford Civic Center	13,806	29–33–2	60	
65	March 5, 1986	Buffalo Sabres	5–1		Liut	Hartford Civic Center	13,019	30–33–2	62	
66	March 7, 1986	@ Buffalo Sabres	6–2		Liut	Buffalo Memorial Auditorium	15,764	31–33–2	64	
67	March 8, 1986	Quebec Nordiques	3–6		Liut	Hartford Civic Center	13,616	31–34–2	64	
68	March 10, 1986	@ Montreal Canadiens	5–2		Liut	Montreal Forum	16,616	32–34–2	66	
69	March 13, 1986	New York Islanders	2–3		Liut	Hartford Civic Center	13,140	32–35–2	66	
70	March 15, 1986	Chicago Black Hawks	11–4		Liut	Hartford Civic Center	12,233	33–35–2	68	
71	March 18, 1986	@ Detroit Red Wings	6–4		Liut	Joe Louis Arena	15,640	34–35–2	70	
72	March 19, 1986	@ St. Louis Blues	5–2		Liut	St. Louis Arena	8,377	35–35–2	72	
73	March 22, 1986	Los Angeles Kings	6–3		Liut	Hartford Civic Center	12,198	36–35–2	74	
74	March 23, 1986	Boston Bruins	5–5	OT	Liut	Hartford Civic Center	15,126	36–35–3	75	
75	March 26, 1986	Montreal Canadiens	3–0		Liut	Hartford Civic Center	13,877	37–35–3	77	
76	March 29, 1986	Washington Capitals	6–6	OT	Liut	Hartford Civic Center	14,266	37–35–4	78	

April: 3–1–0 (home: 2–0–0; road: 1–1–0)

Game	Date	Opponent	Score	OT	Decision	Location	Attendance	Record	Points	Recap
77	April 1, 1986	Buffalo Sabres	5–3		Liut	Hartford Civic Center	15,126	38–35–4	80	
78	April 3, 1986	@ Washington Capitals	2–4		Liut	Capital Centre	14,155	38–36–4	80	
79	April 5, 1986	Toronto Maple Leafs	7–1		Liut	Hartford Civic Center	15,126	39–36–4	82	
80	April 6, 1986	@ Boston Bruins	4–3		Weeks	Boston Garden	12,787	40–36–4	84	

Legend: Win (2 points) Loss (0 points) Tie (1 point)

=== Playoffs ===
1986 Stanley Cup playoffs
Adams Division Semifinals vs. (A1) Quebec Nordiques – Whalers win 3–0

Game	Date	Visitor	Score	Home	OT	Decision	Attendance	Series	Recap
1	April 9, 1986	Hartford	3–2	Quebec	OT	Liut	14,504	1–0	
2	April 10, 1986	Hartford	4–1	Quebec		Liut	14,562	2–0	
3	April 12, 1986	Quebec	4–9	Hartford		Liut	15,126	3–0	

Adams Division Finals vs. (A2) Montreal Canadiens – Canadiens win 4–3

Game	Date	Visitor	Score	Home	OT	Decision	Attendance	Series	Recap
1	April 17, 1986	Hartford	4–1	Montreal		Liut	17,145	1–0	
2	April 19, 1986	Hartford	1–3	Montreal		Liut	17,657	1–1	
3	April 21, 1986	Montreal	4–1	Hartford		Weeks	15,126	1–2	
4	April 23, 1986	Montreal	1–2	Hartford	OT	Weeks	15,126	2–2	
5	April 25, 1986	Hartford	3–5	Montreal		Weeks	17,660	2–3	
6	April 27, 1986	Montreal	0–1	Hartford		Liut	15,126	3–3	
7	April 29, 1986	Hartford	1–2	Montreal	OT	Liut	17,546	3–4	

Legend: Win Loss

=== Detailed records ===
Prince of Wales Conference
Opponent	W	L	T	PTS	WP	GS	GA
Adams Division
Boston Bruins	3	4	1	7	0.438	29	26
Buffalo Sabres	6	2	0	12	0.750	35	24
Hartford Whalers							
Montreal Canadiens	3	4	1	7	0.438	33	34
Quebec Nordiques	4	4	0	8	0.750	33	33
Division Total	16	14	2	34	0.531	130	117
Patrick Division
New Jersey Devils	2	1	0	4	0.667	14	15
New York Islanders	1	2	0	2	0.333	9	12
New York Rangers	2	1	0	4	0.667	14	5
Philadelphia Flyers	0	3	0	0	0.000	2	11
Pittsburgh Penguins	2	1	0	4	0.667	10	12
Washington Capitals	0	2	1	1	0.167	12	15
Division Total	7	10	1	15	0.417	61	70
Conference Total	23	24	3	49	0.490	191	187

Clarence Campbell Conference
Opponent	W	L	T	PTS	WP	GS	GA
Norris Division
Chicago Black Hawks	1	2	0	2	0.333	15	17
Detroit Red Wings	2	1	0	4	0.667	14	10
Minnesota North Stars	1	2	0	2	0.333	8	11
St. Louis Blues	1	1	1	3	0.500	11	14
Toronto Maple Leafs	3	0	0	6	1.000	17	5
Division Total	8	6	1	17	0.567	65	57
Opponent	W	L	T	PTS	WP	GS	GA
Smythe Division
Calgary Flames	2	1	0	4	0.667	18	12
Edmonton Oilers	0	3	0	0	0.000	9	16
Los Angeles Kings	2	1	0	4	0.667	16	11
Vancouver Canucks	3	0	0	6	1.000	14	11
Winnipeg Jets	2	1	0	4	0.667	19	8
Division Total	9	6	0	18	0.600	76	58
Conference Total	17	12	1	35	0.583	141	115
NHL Total	40	36	4	84	0.525	332	302

Month	Games	Won	Lost	Tie	Points	Win %	GS	GA
October	10	6	4	0	12	0.600	44	43
November	12	5	7	0	10	0.417	43	46
December	14	8	5	1	17	0.607	59	55
January	13	7	6	0	14	0.538	60	41
February	13	2	10	1	5	0.192	40	62
March	14	9	3	2	20	0.714	68	44
April	4	3	1	0	6	0.750	18	11
Total	80	40	36	4	84	0.525	332	302

	Games	Won	Lost	Tie	Points	Win %	GS	GA
Home	40	21	17	2	44	0.550	181	153
Away	40	19	19	2	40	0.500	151	149
Total	80	40	36	4	84	0.525	332	302

== Game Officials ==
=== Regular Season ===
1985–86 Hartford Whalers
Regular Season Game Officials
October
#	Date	Opponent	Referee	Linesman	Linesman
November
#	Date	Opponent	Referee	Linesman	Linesman
December
#	Date	Opponent	Referee	Linesman	Linesman
January
#	Date	Opponent	Referee	Linesman	Linesman
February
#	Date	Opponent	Referee	Linesman	Linesman
March
#	Date	Opponent	Referee	Linesman	Linesman
April
#	Date	Opponent	Referee	Linesman	Linesman

=== Playoffs ===
1985–86 Hartford Whalers
Playoff Game Officials
Adams Division Semifinals vs. (A1) Quebec Nordiques
#	Date	Opponent	Referee	Linesman	Linesman
Adams Division Finals vs. (A2) Montreal Canadiens
#	Date	Opponent	Referee	Linesman	Linesman

== Playoffs ==
=== Whalers 3, Nordiques 0 ===
The Whalers opened the 1986 Stanley Cup playoffs against the Quebec Nordiques in a best-of-five series. Quebec finished the regular season with a 43-31-6 record, earning 92 points, and finishing in first place in the Adams Division. In 1985, the Nordiques reached the Wales Conference finals, where they lost to the Philadelphia Flyers. The 1986 post-season was the Whalers first playoff appearance since 1980.

The series opened on April 9 at Le Colisée in Quebec City. The Nordiques opened the scoring 2:44 into the game on a power play goal by Anton Stastny, however, the Whalers Dean Evason scored with 49 seconds remaining in the period to tie the game 1-1. The clubs played to a goalless second period, as the game remained tied heading into the third. In the third period, the Whalers John Anderson scored on the power play at 9:29, giving Hartford their first lead of the game at 2–1. Just over three minutes later, the Nordiques tied the game on a goal by Brent Ashton, as Quebec tied the game 2–2. The game would go into overtime, as the Whalers Sylvain Turgeon scored 2:36 into the extra period, as the Whalers defeated the Nordiques 3–2 to win their first ever post-season game, and take a 1–0 series lead. Mike Liut made 37 saves for the victory.

The second game of the series was played on April 10 in Quebec. The Whalers took an early 1–0 lead on a goal by Stew Gavin 3:53 into the game. At 8:51 of the first period, Paul MacDermid scored for Hartford, giving the club a 2–0 lead over Quebec after the first period. In the second period, MacDermid scored his second goal of the game, as Hartford took a 3–0 lead after two periods. In the third period, the Nordiques Alain Cote scored 1:39 into the period, cutting the Whalers lead to 3–1. With under five minutes remaining in the period, the Whalers Torrie Robertson scored, as Hartford won the game 4-1 and took a 2–0 series lead. Mike Liut was very solid in goal again for the Whalers, as he made 26 saves for the win.

The series shifted back to the Hartford Civic Center for the third game, as the Whalers pushed the Nordiques on the brink of elimination. The third game of the series was played on April 12. The Whalers opened the scoring 2:29 into the game on a power play goal by Kevin Dineen. Just under three minutes later, the Whalers Dave Tippett scored a shorthanded goal to give Hartford a 2–0 lead. The Nordiques Alain Lemieux cut the Whalers lead to 2–1 with a power play goal midway through the period. At 15:08, the Whalers Ron Francis restored the two goal lead with his first career playoff goal. Just 44 seconds later, the Nordiques Brent Ashton cut the Whalers lead down to one with a shorthanded goal, as Hartford held a 3–2 lead. With 40 seconds remaining in the period, the Whalers Ray Ferraro scored a power play, as Hartford took a 4–2 lead into the first intermission. Early in the second period, Ulf Samuelsson scored for Hartford, extending their lead to 5–2. At 11:06 of the second period, the Nordiques Michel Goulet scored a power play goal, cutting the Whalers lead to 5–3. Just over two minutes later, the Whalers Ray Ferraro scored his second power play goal of the game, as Hartford regained their three-goal lead. Twenty-six seconds after Ferraro's goal, the Whalers John Anderson scored on the power play, giving the Whales a commanding 7–3 lead. In the third period, Anderson scored his second goal of the game 7:00 into the period, as Hartford took a lead of 8–3. The Nordiques Mark Kumpel scored midway through the period, however, the Whalers Kevin Dineen scored his second goal of the game with under two minutes left, as the Whalers crushed the Nordiques 9–4 to sweep the series and complete the upset. This marked the first time in franchise history that the Whalers had won a series since moving to the NHL.

=== Canadiens 4, Whalers 3 ===
The Whalers faced the Montreal Canadiens in a best-of-seven series to determine the champion of the Adams Division. Montreal finished the regular season with a 40–33–7 record, earning 87 points and second place in the Adams Division. In the first round of the post-season, the Canadiens swept the Boston Bruins in three games. The Whalers and Canadiens had previously met in the post-season during the 1979–80 season, as Montreal swept Hartford in the first round of the playoffs.

The series opened on April 17 at the Montreal Forum in Montreal. The two clubs skated to a scoreless first period, as Mike Liut shut the door for the Whalers, making 14 saves during the period. In the second period, Hartford opened the scoring with a goal by Stew Gavin at 4:24 to take a 1–0 lead. Just over two minutes later, the Whalers struck again, as Sylvain Turgeon scored to make it 2–0 for the Whalers. Late in the second period, John Anderson scored on the power play, as the Whalers took a 3–0 lead into the third period. Midway through the third period, the Canadiens Chris Nilan ended the shutout bid by Liut, as he scored to cut the Whalers lead to 3–1. The Whalers Stew Gavin scored his second goal of the game as he scored an empty net goal with 58 seconds left in the period, as Hartford won the game 4–1 and took a 1–0 series lead.

The second game of the series was played on April 19 in Montreal. In the first period, the Canadiens scored first, as Stephane Richer scored on the power play at 12:33 of the period. Just under five minutes later, Guy Carbonneau of the Canadiens scored to make it 2–0. The Canadiens dominated the Whalers in the first period, outshooting them 15–2. In the second period, the Canadiens Guy Carbonneau scored his second goal of the game 6:12 into the period, making it 3–0 for Montreal. The Whalers responded with a power play goal by Ray Ferraro just over a minute later, as Hartford cut the Canadiens lead to 3–1. This would be as close as Hartford would get, as the Canadiens shut down the Whalers for the rest of the game, winning the contest 3–1 and tying the series up at 1–1.

The series shifted to the Hartford Civic Center for game three, played on April 21. Montreal opened the scoring early in the first period on a goal by Kjell Dahlin to take a 1–0 lead. Late in the period, the Canadiens Stephane Richer scored on the power play, as Montreal took a 2–0 lead into the first intermission. The Canadiens struck again, as early in the second period, Claude Lemieux scored as Montreal took a 3–0 lead in the game. The Whalers Dave Tippett scored just 32 seconds after Lemieux, cutting the Canadiens lead to 3–1. In the third period, Montreal continued to hold off the Whalers, then Guy Carbonneau scored an empty net goal late in the period, as Montreal won the game 4–1 and took a 2–1 series lead over Hartford.

The fourth game of the series was played on April 23 in Hartford. The Whalers opened the scoring at 13:53 of the first period, as Stew Gavin scored against Patrick Roy of the Canadiens to give Hartford a 1–0 lead. The two clubs played very tight defensively, as after two periods, the score remained 1-0 Hartford, as the shot count was 12-11 for Montreal through two periods. In the third period, the Canadiens Mats Naslund scored a power play goal at 12:22, as Montreal tied the game 1-1, sending the game into overtime. In the extra period, the Whalers Kevin Dineen scored 1:07 into the period, leading Hartford to a 2–1 victory and tying the series at 2–2.

The series shifted back to Montreal for the fifth game, played on April 25. Only 2:05 into the game, the Canadiens Claude Lemieux scored a power play goal, giving the Canadiens a 1–0 lead. At 8:26 of the first period, Montreal's Guy Carbonneau scored a shorthanded goal, followed by a second power play goal by the Canadiens, this time by Mats Naslund, as Montreal took an early 3–0 in the game. With under five minutes remaining in the period, the Whalers Kevin Dineen scored, as Montreal took a 3–1 lead after the first period. In the second period, the Whalers Kevin Dineen scored his second goal of the game at 14:14, cutting the Canadiens lead down to 3–2. Just under two minutes later, Mike Lalor scored for the Canadiens, as Montreal took a 4–2 lead after two periods. Midway through the third period, the Whalers John Anderson scored, as Hartford trailed Montreal by a score of 4–3. The Canadiens managed to hold off the Whalers, as Guy Carbonneau scored a late goal, as Montreal won the game 5-3 and took a 3–2 series lead.

The series returned to Hartford for the sixth game, with the Whalers facing elimination. The game was played on April 27. In the first period, Montreal fired 14 shots at Mike Liut, however, Liut stopped them all as the game remained scoreless after the first period. In the second period, Dean Evason finally broke through for the Whalers, as he scored at the 7:30 mark of the period, giving the Whalers a 1–0 lead. The Whalers took this lead into the third period. In the third period, the Whalers were able to hold off the Canadiens, as Mike Liut made 32 saves for his first career playoff shutout, as the Whalers defeated the Canadiens 1–0 and tied the series up at 3–3.

The seventh and final game of the series was played back in Montreal on April 29. With only 13 seconds left in the first period, the Canadiens Mike McPhee scored a shorthanded goal, giving the Canadiens a 1–0 lead. The game was played very tight defensively, as Montreal held on to their 1–0 lead late into the third period. The Whalers Dave Babych broke the shutout bid by Patrick Roy with under three minutes left in the game, as Hartford tied the game 1-1, sending the contest into overtime. In the extra period, the Canadiens Claude Lemieux scored on Mike Liut 5:55 into the extra period, as Montreal won the game 2–1 and won the series, eliminating the Whalers from the post-season.

== Player statistics ==
=== Skaters ===
Regular season
Player	GP	G	A	Pts	+/−	PIM
Sylvain Turgeon	76	45	34	79	+1	88
Ron Francis	53	24	53	77	+8	24
Ray Ferraro	76	30	47	77	+10	57
Kevin Dineen	57	33	35	68	+16	124
Stewart Gavin	76	26	29	55	+12	51
Dave Babych^{†}	62	10	43	53	+2	36
Dean Evason	55	20	28	48	+12	65
Paul Lawless	64	17	21	38	−3	20
Torrie Robertson	76	13	24	37	−11	358
Bob Crawford^{‡}	57	14	20	34	−16	16
Dave Tippett	80	14	20	34	+9	18
Risto Siltanen^{‡}	52	8	22	30	+2	30
Wayne Babych^{†}	37	11	17	28	+6	59
Dana Murzyn	78	3	23	26	+1	125
John Anderson^{†}	14	8	17	25	+18	2
Joel Quenneville	80	5	19	24	+21	83
Doug Jarvis^{†}	57	8	16	24	+7	20
Ulf Samuelsson	80	5	19	24	+7	174
Paul MacDermid	74	13	10	23	+1	160
Ray Neufeld^{‡}	16	5	10	15	−3	40
Greg Malone^{‡}	22	6	7	13	−5	24
Jörgen Pettersson^{‡}	23	5	5	10	−11	2
Tim Bothwell	62	2	8	10	+11	53
Bill Gardner^{†}	18	1	8	9	−6	4
Scot Kleinendorst	41	2	7	9	+8	62
Mike McEwen^{†}	10	3	2	5	+5	6
Mike Hoffman	6	1	2	3	−1	2
Brad Shaw	8	0	2	2	−1	4
Mike Zuke	17	0	2	2	−2	12
Paul Fenton	1	0	0	0	+1	0
Sylvain Côté	2	0	0	0	+1	0
John Newberry	3	0	0	0	−4	0
Mark Paterson	5	0	0	0	−5	5
Jack Brownschidle	9	0	0	0	−4	4

Playoffs
Player	GP	G	A	Pts	+/−	PIM
Kevin Dineen	10	6	7	13	+2	18
John Anderson	10	5	8	13	+3	0
Ray Ferraro	10	3	6	9	−1	4
Sylvain Turgeon	9	2	3	5	+2	4
Stewart Gavin	10	4	1	5	+6	13
Dean Evason	10	1	4	5	+4	10
Mike McEwen	8	0	4	4	−1	6
Dave Babych	8	1	3	4	−1	14
Dave Tippett	10	2	2	4	+3	4
Ulf Samuelsson	10	1	2	3	+5	38
Paul MacDermid	10	2	1	3	+1	20
Doug Jarvis	10	0	3	3	+1	4
Ron Francis	10	1	2	3	−1	4
Joel Quenneville	10	0	2	2	+7	12
Torrie Robertson	10	1	0	1	−1	67
Scot Kleinendorst	10	0	1	1	+6	18
Wayne Babych	10	0	1	1	−2	2
Paul Lawless	1	0	0	0	0	0
Dana Murzyn	4	0	0	0	+2	10
Tim Bothwell	10	0	0	0	+2	8

=== Goaltenders ===
Regular season
Player	GP	GS	TOI	W	L	T	GA	GAA	SA	SV%	SO	G	A	PIM
Mike Liut	57	56	3277:35	27	23	4	197	3.61	1,569	.874	2	0	2	0
Steve Weeks	27	24	1542:20	13	13	0	99	3.85	721	.863	1	0	1	9

Playoffs
Player	GP	GS	TOI	W	L	GA	GAA	SA	SV%	SO	G	A	PIM
Mike Liut	8	8	439:29	5	2	14	1.91	212	.938	1	0	0	0
Steve Weeks	3	2	167:33	1	2	8	2.86	56	.875	0	0	0	0

^{†}Denotes player spent time with another team before joining the Whalers. Stats reflect time with the Whalers only.
^{‡}Denotes player was traded mid-season. Stats reflect time with the Whalers only.
Bold/italics denotes franchise record.

== Transactions ==
The Whalers were involved in the following transactions during the 1985–86 season.

=== Trades ===
October 4, 1985	To St. Louis Blues Cash	To Hartford Whalers Tim Bothwell
October 7, 1985	To Toronto Maple Leafs Chris Kotsopoulos	To Hartford Whalers Stew Gavin
November 21, 1985	To Winnipeg Jets Ray Neufeld	To Hartford Whalers Dave Babych
December 6, 1985	To Washington Capitals Jorgen Pettersson	To Hartford Whalers Doug Jarvis
January 17, 1986	To Quebec Nordiques Greg Malone	To Hartford Whalers Wayne Babych
February 3, 1986	To Chicago Black Hawks 3rd round pick in 1987 – Mike Dagenais	To Hartford Whalers Bill Gardner
March 8, 1986	To Quebec Nordiques Risto Siltanen	To Hartford Whalers John Anderson
March 11, 1986	To New York Rangers Bob Crawford	To Hartford Whalers Mike McEwen

=== Free agents ===
Player	Former team
John Newberry	Montreal Canadiens

== Media ==
=== Television ===
Television
Channel	Play-by-play	Color commentator(s)
SportsChannel New England	Rick Peckham	Gerry Cheevers and Don Blackburn
WVIT–TV 30	Rick Peckham	Gerry Cheevers and Don Blackburn

=== Radio ===
Radio
Flagship Station	Play-by-play	Color commentator(s)
WTIC–AM 1080	Chuck Kaiton	Andre Lacroix
