= 1985–86 Winnipeg Jets season =

NHL hockey team season

1985–86 Winnipeg Jets
- Division: 3rd Smythe
- Conference: 6th Campbell
- 1985–86 record: 26–47–7
- Home record: 18–19–3
- Road record: 8–28–4
- Goals for: 295
- Goals against: 372

Team information
- General manager: John Ferguson
- Coach: Barry Long 19-41-6; John Ferguson 7-6-1
- Captain: Dale Hawerchuk
- Arena: Winnipeg Arena

Team leaders
- Goals: Dale Hawerchuk (46)
- Assists: Dale Hawerchuk (59)
- Points: Dale Hawerchuk (105)
- Penalty minutes: Laurie Boschman (241)
- Wins: Brian Hayward (13)
- Goals against average: Dan Bouchard (3.80)

The 1985–86 Winnipeg Jets season was the 14th season of the Winnipeg Jets, their seventh season in the National Hockey League (NHL). General Manager John Ferguson replaced coach Barry Long late in the season and guided the club on an interim basis to a 7–6–1 record. The Jets placed third in the Smythe, and despite their dismal 26–47–7 record, qualified for the playoffs only to lose to the Calgary Flames in the first round.

== Offseason ==
After a record breaking 1984–85 season, in which the Jets posted 43–27–10 record, earning 96 points, the team had a very quiet off-season. Winnipeg participated in the 1985 NHL entry draft on June 15, 1985, and with their first round pick, 18th overall, the Jets selected Ryan Stewart from the Kamloops Blazers of the WHL. Stewart had 33 goals and 70 points in 54 games with the Blazers during the 1984–85 season. Some other notable selections by the Jets were goaltender Daniel Berthiaume in the third round, defenseman Fredrik Olausson in the fourth round and forward Danton Cole in the sixth round.

On June 25, 1985, the Jets signed team captain Dale Hawerchuk to an eight-year, $3.2 million contract. Hawerchuk, who was the first overall draft pick by Winnipeg in the 1981 NHL entry draft was coming off a 53-goal and 130 point season with the club in the 1984–85 season. The club signed undrafted free agent goaltender Pokey Reddick on September 25, 1985. Reddick spent the 1984–85 season with the Brandon Wheat Kings, going 14-30-1 with a 5.64 GAA in 47 games.

== Regular season ==
The only thing to keep fan interest near the end of the season was the three-way turtle derby between the Jets, Vancouver Canucks, and Los Angeles Kings for the final two playoff spots in the Smythe Division, since the Edmonton Oilers and Calgary Flames were well ahead of them and had already locked up the top two spots in the division. After a dreadful February in which they went 3-8-1 to drop to 19th overall in the NHL (ahead of only Vancouver and a woeful Detroit squad), the Jets went 5-4-1 in their last ten to finish tied with Vancouver for third place in the Smythe with 59 points, while Los Angeles was out with 54. But since the Jets had more wins than the Canucks (26 to 23), Winnipeg won the tiebreaker and claimed third place in the Smythe, drawing the Calgary Flames in the first-round thus avoiding a matchup with the two-time defending Stanley Cup champion and Presidents Trophy winning Edmonton Oilers.

=== Final standings ===
Smythe Division
	GP	W	L	T	GF	GA	Pts
**Edmonton Oilers**	80	56	17	7	426	310	119
**Calgary Flames**	80	40	31	9	354	315	89
**Winnipeg Jets**	80	26	47	7	295	372	59
**Vancouver Canucks**	80	23	44	13	282	333	59
Los Angeles Kings	80	23	49	8	284	389	54

Note: GP = Games played, W = Wins, L = Losses, T = Ties, Pts = Points, GF = Goals for, GA = Goals against
Note: Teams that qualified for the playoffs are highlighted in bold.

=== Record vs. opponents ===
Smythe Division record vs. opponents

==== Vs. Campbell Conference ====
**Vs. Smythe Division**

1985–86 NHL records
Team	**CGY**	**EDM**	**LAK**	**VAN**	**WIN**	**Total**
Calgary	—	1−6−1	7−1	4−2−2	6−1−1	**18−10−4**
Edmonton	6−1−1	—	6−0−2	7−0−1	6−2	**25−3−4**
Los Angeles	1−7	0−6−2	—	1−5−2	5−2−1	**7−20−5**
Vancouver	2−4−2	0−7−1	5−1−2	—	3−3−2	**10−15−7**
Winnipeg	1−6−1	2−6	2−5−1	3−3−2	—	**8−20−4**

**Vs. Norris Division**

1985–86 NHL records
Team	**CHI**	**DET**	**MIN**	**STL**	**TOR**	**Total**
Calgary	1−2	2−0−1	0−2−1	1−2	2−1	**6−7−2**
Edmonton	3−0	3−0	2−1	1−1−1	2−1	**11−3−1**
Los Angeles	0−1−2	1−2	2−1	1−1−1	2−1	**6−6−3**
Vancouver	0−3	3−0	2−1	0−3	2−0−1	**7−7−1**
Winnipeg	1−2	3−0	2−1	1−2	1−1−1	**8−6−1**

**Vs. Wales Conference**

**Vs. Adams Division**

1985–86 NHL records
Team	**BOS**	**BUF**	**HFD**	**MTL**	**QUE**	**Total**
Calgary	1−2	1−1−1	1−2	1−2	1−2	**5−9−1**
Edmonton	2−1	1−2	3−0	3−0	2−1	**11−4−0**
Los Angeles	0−3	2−1	1−2	1−2	1−2	**5−10−0**
Vancouver	0−1−2	1−2	0−3	0−3	1−1−1	**2−10−3**
Winnipeg	0−3	1−2	1−2	1−2	2−1	**5−10−0**

**Vs. Patrick Division**

1985–86 NHL records
Team	**NJD**	**NYI**	**NYR**	**PHI**	**PIT**	**WSH**	**Total**
Calgary	2−0−1	1−1−1	2−1	1−2	2−1	3−0	**11−5−2**
Edmonton	3−0	1−0−2	1−2	2−1	2−1	0−3	**9−7−2**
Los Angeles	1−2	1−2	1−2	0−3	1−2	1−2	**5−13−0**
Vancouver	1−2	1−1−1	0−3	1−2	1−2	0−2−1	**4−12−2**
Winnipeg	1−2	0−2−1	1−2	1−2	1−2	1−1−1	**5−11−2**

== Schedule and results ==
1985–86 regular season
October

Game	Result	Date	Score	Opponent	Record	Attendance
1	L	October 10, 1985	3–4	@ Edmonton Oilers (1985–86)	0–1–0	17,498
2	L	October 11, 1985	3–8	@ Calgary Flames (1985–86)	0–2–0	16,762
3	L	October 13, 1985	2–5	Quebec Nordiques (1985–86)	0–3–0	14,374
4	W	October 16, 1985	4–3	@ Detroit Red Wings (1985–86)	1–3–0	14,766
5	W	October 19, 1985	4–3	@ Toronto Maple Leafs (1985–86)	2–3–0	15,009
6	W	October 20, 1985	8–5	Calgary Flames (1985–86)	3–3–0	15,527
7	W	October 23, 1985	9–3	Edmonton Oilers (1985–86)	4–3–0	13,269
8	T	October 25, 1985	7–7 OT	Washington Capitals (1985–86)	4–3–1	12,472
9	W	October 27, 1985	5–3	Detroit Red Wings (1985–86)	5–3–1	11,913
10	L	October 30, 1985	3–7	@ Edmonton Oilers (1985–86)	5–4–1	17,243

November

Game	Result	Date	Score	Opponent	Record	Attendance
11	W	November 2, 1985	3–1	@ Minnesota North Stars (1985–86)	6–4–1	13,026
12	L	November 3, 1985	3–4 OT	St. Louis Blues (1985–86)	6–5–1	11,376
13	L	November 6, 1985	3–7	@ Buffalo Sabres (1985–86)	6–6–1	10,828
14	L	November 8, 1985	3–7	New York Rangers (1985–86)	6–7–1	15,296
15	L	November 9, 1985	2–7	Vancouver Canucks (1985–86)	6–8–1	11,324
16	T	November 13, 1985	3–3 OT	@ Calgary Flames (1985–86)	6–8–2	16,762
17	W	November 15, 1985	5–3	New Jersey Devils (1985–86)	7–8–2	11,348
18	L	November 17, 1985	4–5	Calgary Flames (1985–86)	7–9–2	14,155
19	W	November 20, 1985	3–1	St. Louis Blues (1985–86)	8–9–2	10,494
20	L	November 22, 1985	1–8	@ Pittsburgh Penguins (1985–86)	8–10–2	10,338
21	L	November 23, 1985	1–8	@ Hartford Whalers (1985–86)	8–11–2	11,957
22	L	November 26, 1985	3–4	@ New Jersey Devils (1985–86)	8–12–2	9,835
23	L	November 27, 1985	1–6	@ Philadelphia Flyers (1985–86)	8–13–2	17,211
24	L	November 29, 1985	1–4	New York Islanders (1985–86)	8–14–2	15,426

December

Game	Result	Date	Score	Opponent	Record	Attendance
25	W	December 1, 1985	2–1	Philadelphia Flyers (1985–86)	9–14–2	13,528
26	T	December 3, 1985	4–4 OT	@ New York Islanders (1985–86)	9–14–3	15,362
27	L	December 4, 1985	4–7	@ New York Rangers (1985–86)	9–15–3	16,872
28	L	December 7, 1985	2–3	Los Angeles Kings (1985–86)	9–16–3	13,095
29	L	December 8, 1985	1–4	Los Angeles Kings (1985–86)	9–17–3	11,435
30	W	December 11, 1985	6–3	@ Vancouver Canucks (1985–86)	10–17–3	8,584
31	L	December 13, 1985	3–6	Edmonton Oilers (1985–86)	10–18–3	15,447
32	T	December 15, 1985	3–3 OT	Toronto Maple Leafs (1985–86)	10–18–4	14,438
33	L	December 17, 1985	6–8	@ St. Louis Blues (1985–86)	10–19–4	8,865
34	L	December 18, 1985	4–5	@ Chicago Black Hawks (1985–86)	10–20–4	16,363
35	W	December 20, 1985	7–4	Washington Capitals (1985–86)	11–20–4	14,686
36	W	December 22, 1985	7–5	@ Edmonton Oilers (1985–86)	12–20–4	17,498
37	L	December 23, 1985	3–5	@ Vancouver Canucks (1985–86)	12–21–4	10,406
38	L	December 26, 1985	5–6	Minnesota North Stars (1985–86)	12–22–4	13,998
39	L	December 28, 1985	4–5	@ Los Angeles Kings (1985–86)	12–23–4	9,969
40	L	December 30, 1985	2–4	@ Los Angeles Kings (1985–86)	12–24–4	8,577

January

Game	Result	Date	Score	Opponent	Record	Attendance
41	L	January 3, 1986	3–7	Montreal Canadiens (1985–86)	12–25–4	15,461
42	W	January 5, 1986	4–0	Vancouver Canucks (1985–86)	13–25–4	11,860
43	T	January 7, 1986	2–2 OT	Vancouver Canucks (1985–86)	13–25–5	10,879
44	L	January 11, 1986	4–8	@ Boston Bruins (1985–86)	13–26–5	13,124
45	W	January 14, 1986	5–4	@ Quebec Nordiques (1985–86)	14–26–5	13,848
46	L	January 15, 1986	0–4	@ Montreal Canadiens (1985–86)	14–27–5	16,135
47	W	January 17, 1986	5–1	Chicago Black Hawks (1985–86)	15–27–5	15,577
48	L	January 19, 1986	1–2	Boston Bruins (1985–86)	15–28–5	15,577
49	L	January 22, 1986	3–6	@ Buffalo Sabres (1985–86)	15–29–5	11,621
50	L	January 23, 1986	5–7	@ Boston Bruins (1985–86)	15–30–5	10,191
51	L	January 25, 1986	2–7	@ Hartford Whalers (1985–86)	15–31–5	12,471
52	W	January 29, 1986	5–3	Buffalo Sabres (1985–86)	16–31–5	12,755

February

Game	Result	Date	Score	Opponent	Record	Attendance
53	L	February 1, 1986	6–9	Los Angeles Kings (1985–86)	16–32–5	12,877
54	W	February 2, 1986	6–3	Los Angeles Kings (1985–86)	17–32–5	12,540
55	L	February 7, 1986	2–5	@ Vancouver Canucks (1985–86)	17–33–5	11,438
56	T	February 9, 1986	3–3 OT	@ Vancouver Canucks (1985–86)	17–33–6	11,353
57	L	February 12, 1986	2–4	@ Calgary Flames (1985–86)	17–34–6	16,762
58	W	February 14, 1986	5–4	Hartford Whalers (1985–86)	18–34–6	14,620
59	L	February 17, 1986	4–8	@ Philadelphia Flyers (1985–86)	18–35–6	17,211
60	L	February 19, 1986	2–5	@ Pittsburgh Penguins (1985–86)	18–36–6	12,558
61	L	February 21, 1986	2–5	Chicago Black Hawks (1985–86)	18–37–6	13,317
62	W	February 23, 1986	4–2	Quebec Nordiques (1985–86)	19–37–6	14,354
63	L	February 26, 1986	2–8	Edmonton Oilers (1985–86)	19–38–6	14,047
64	L	February 28, 1986	3–6	New York Islanders (1985–86)	19–39–6	14,614

March

Game	Result	Date	Score	Opponent	Record	Attendance
65	L	March 2, 1986	4–6	@ New Jersey Devils (1985–86)	19–40–6	10,262
66	L	March 3, 1986	1–6	@ Toronto Maple Leafs (1985–86)	19–41–6	15,349
67	W	March 5, 1986	4–1	New York Rangers (1985–86)	20–41–6	13,136
68	W	March 8, 1986	4–2	@ Minnesota North Stars (1985–86)	21–41–6	14,030
69	W	March 9, 1986	5–3	Pittsburgh Penguins (1985–86)	22–41–6	15,128
70	L	March 12, 1986	5–8	Edmonton Oilers (1985–86)	22–42–6	13,335
71	W	March 16, 1986	6–0	Detroit Red Wings (1985–86)	23–42–6	13,570
72	L	March 18, 1986	2–6	@ Edmonton Oilers (1985–86)	23–43–6	17,498
73	W	March 19, 1986	6–4	Montreal Canadiens (1985–86)	24–43–6	14,135
74	L	March 21, 1986	3–5	@ Washington Capitals (1985–86)	24–44–6	18,130
75	L	March 23, 1986	4–7	Calgary Flames (1985–86)	24–45–6	13,254
76	W	March 24, 1986	8–4	Vancouver Canucks (1985–86)	25–45–6	13,837
77	L	March 28, 1986	3–6	@ Calgary Flames (1985–86)	25–46–6	16,762
78	W	March 31, 1986	5–2	@ Los Angeles Kings (1985–86)	26–46–6	9,170

April

Game	Result	Date	Score	Opponent	Record	Attendance
79	T	April 2, 1986	4–4 OT	@ Los Angeles Kings (1985–86)	26–46–7	8,843
80	L	April 6, 1986	4–6	Calgary Flames (1985–86)	26–47–7	15,487

Legend: Win (2 points) Loss (0 points) Tie (1 point)

== Playoffs ==
The Jets lost the Division Semi-finals in three-straight against the Calgary Flames.

== Player statistics ==
=== Regular season ===
Scoring

Player	Pos	GP	G	A	Pts	PIM	+/-	PPG	SHG	GWG
Dale Hawerchuk	C	80	46	59	105	44	-27	18	2	2
Laurie Boschman	C	77	27	42	69	241	-29	3	2	2
Thomas Steen	C	78	17	47	64	76	-29	2	3	1
Brian Mullen	RW	79	28	34	62	38	-17	13	0	3
Paul MacLean	RW	69	27	29	56	74	-14	11	0	2
Perry Turnbull	C	80	20	31	51	183	-18	6	0	2
Randy Carlyle	D	68	16	33	49	93	-12	3	0	2
Ray Neufeld	RW	60	20	28	48	62	-17	7	0	4
Dave Ellett	D	80	15	31	46	96	-38	2	0	1
Scott Arniel	LW	80	18	25	43	40	-8	3	0	0
Doug Smail	LW	73	16	26	42	32	-10	1	3	4
Mario Marois	D	56	4	28	32	110	-22	0	0	0
Dave Babych	D	19	4	12	16	14	-1	2	0	0
Jim Nill	RW	61	6	8	14	75	-6	0	0	1
Tim Watters	D	56	6	8	14	97	-10	0	0	0
Ron Wilson	C	54	6	7	13	16	-2	0	2	0
Bill Derlago	C	27	5	5	10	6	-13	1	0	0
Bengt Lundholm	LW	16	3	5	8	6	-4	0	1	0
Robert Picard	D	20	2	5	7	17	-2	0	0	1
Andrew McBain	RW	28	3	3	6	17	-11	0	0	0
Dave Silk	RW	32	2	4	6	63	4	0	0	1
Bobby Dollas	D	46	0	5	5	66	-3	0	0	0
Jim Kyte	D	71	1	3	4	126	-21	0	0	0
Anssi Melametsa	RW	27	0	3	3	2	-5	0	0	0
Brian Hayward	G	52	0	2	2	25	0	0	0	0
Brad Berry	D	13	1	0	1	10	1	0	0	0
Murray Eaves	C	4	1	0	1	0	-2	0	0	0
Ryan Stewart	C	3	1	0	1	0	0	0	0	0
Dan Bouchard	G	32	0	1	1	38	0	0	0	0
Wade Campbell	D	24	0	1	1	27	-12	0	0	0
Dan McFall	D	7	0	1	1	0	-3	0	0	0
Paul Pooley	C	3	0	1	1	0	1	0	0	0
Marc Behrend	G	9	0	0	0	0	0	0	0	0
Peter Douris	RW	11	0	0	0	0	-1	0	0	0
Tom Martin	LW	5	0	0	0	0	0	0	0	0
Peter Taglianetti	D	18	0	0	0	48	-1	0	0	0

Goaltending

Player	MIN	GP	W	L	T	GA	GAA	SO	SA	SV	SV%
Brian Hayward	2721	52	13	28	5	217	4.79	0	1373	1156	.842
Dan Bouchard	1696	32	11	14	2	107	3.79	2	790	683	.865
Marc Behrend	422	9	2	5	0	41	5.83	0	220	179	.814
Team:	4839	80	26	47	7	365	4.53	2	2383	2018	.847

=== Playoffs ===
Scoring

Player	Pos	GP	G	A	Pts	PIM	+/-	PPG	SHG	GWG
Mario Marois	D	3	1	4	5	6	-2	1	0	0
Brian Mullen	RW	3	1	2	3	6	-1	1	0	0
Dale Hawerchuk	C	3	0	3	3	0	-2	0	0	0
Ray Neufeld	RW	3	2	0	2	10	-5	1	0	0
Thomas Steen	C	3	1	1	2	4	0	0	1	0
Bill Derlago	C	3	1	0	1	0	1	0	0	0
Paul MacLean	RW	2	1	0	1	7	-2	0	0	0
Doug Smail	LW	3	1	0	1	0	0	0	0	0
Laurie Boschman	C	3	0	1	1	6	-7	0	0	0
Dave Ellett	D	3	0	1	1	0	-4	0	0	0
Perry Turnbull	C	3	0	1	1	11	-5	0	0	0
Scott Arniel	LW	3	0	0	0	12	-2	0	0	0
Marc Behrend	G	1	0	0	0	0	0	0	0	0
Brad Berry	D	3	0	0	0	0	-5	0	0	0
Daniel Berthiaume	G	1	0	0	0	0	0	0	0	0
Dan Bouchard	G	1	0	0	0	2	0	0	0	0
Bobby Dollas	D	3	0	0	0	2	-2	0	0	0
Brian Hayward	G	2	0	0	0	0	0	0	0	0
Jim Kyte	D	3	0	0	0	12	-2	0	0	0
Bengt Lundholm	LW	2	0	0	0	2	0	0	0	0
Jim Nill	RW	3	0	0	0	4	-3	0	0	0
Dave Silk	RW	1	0	0	0	2	1	0	0	0
Peter Taglianetti	D	3	0	0	0	2	-1	0	0	0
Ron Wilson	C	1	0	0	0	0	0	0	0	0

Goaltending

Player	MIN	GP	W	L	GA	GAA	SO	SA	SV	SV%
Marc Behrend	12	1	0	0	0	0.00	0	7	7	1.000
Daniel Berthiaume	68	1	0	1	4	3.53	0	43	39	.907
Dan Bouchard	40	1	0	1	5	7.50	0	22	17	.773
Brian Hayward	68	2	0	1	6	5.29	0	31	25	.806
Team:	188	3	0	3	15	4.79	0	103	88	.854

Note:

Pos = Position;GP = Games played; G = Goals; A = Assists; Pts = Points; PIM = Penalty minutes; +/- = Plus/minus; PPG = Power-play goals; SHG = Short-handed goals; GWG = Game-winning goals
Pos = Position;GP = Games played; Min, TOI = Minutes played; W = Wins; L = Losses; T,T/OT = Ties; OTL = Overtime losses; GA = Goals-against; GAA = Goals-against average; SO = Shutouts; SA = Shots against; SV = Shots saved;SV% = Save percentage;

== Transactions ==
=== Trades ===
October 14, 1985	To Quebec Nordiques 7th round pick in 1986 – Mark Vermette; Cash	To Winnipeg Jets Dan Bouchard
November 21, 1985	To Hartford Whalers Dave Babych	To Winnipeg Jets Ray Neufeld
November 27, 1985	To Quebec Nordiques Robert Picard	To Winnipeg Jets Mario Marois
January 31, 1986	To Boston Bruins Wade Campbell	To Winnipeg Jets Bill Derlago

=== Free agents ===
Player	Former team
Pokey Reddick	Undrafted Free Agent
Dave Silk	Detroit Red Wings
Randy Gilhen	Hartford Whalers

== Draft picks ==
The Jets selected the following players at the 1985 NHL entry draft, which was held at the Toronto Convention Centre in Toronto on June 15, 1985.

=== NHL amateur draft ===
Round	Pick	Player	Nationality	College/Junior/Club team
1	18	Ryan Stewart (C)	Canada	Kamloops Blazers (WHL)
2	39	Roger Ohman (D)	Sweden	Leksands IF (SEL)
3	60	Daniel Berthiaume (G)	Canada	Chicoutimi Saguenéens (QMJHL)
4	81	Fredrik Olausson (D)	Sweden	Färjestad BK (SEL)
5	102	John Borrell (RW)	United States	Burnsville (MN) High School
6	123	Danton Cole (RW)	United States	Aurora Tigers (OJHL)
7	144	Brent Mowery (C)	Canada	Summerland Buckaroos (BCJHL)
8	165	Tom Draper (G)	Canada	University of Vermont (NCAA)
9	186	Neven Kardum (C)	Canada	Father Henry Carr Catholic Secondary School
10	207	Dave Quigley (G)	Canada	Université de Moncton (CIAU)
11	228	Chris Norton (D)	Canada	Cornell University (NCAA)
12	249	Anssi Melametsa (C)	Finland	HIFK Helsinki (SM-liiga)

== See also ==
- 1985–86 NHL season
