= 1985–86 Quebec Nordiques season =

National Hockey League team season

1985–86 Quebec Nordiques
- Adams Division champions
- Division: 1st Adams
- Conference: 3rd Wales
- 1985–86 record: 43–31–6
- Home record: 23–13–4
- Road record: 20–18–2
- Goals for: 330
- Goals against: 289

Team information
- General manager: Maurice Filion
- Coach: Michel Bergeron
- Captain: Mario Marois (Oct–Nov); Peter Stastny (Nov–Apr)
- Arena: Colisée de Québec

Team leaders
- Goals: Michel Goulet (53)
- Assists: Peter Stastny (81)
- Points: Peter Stastny (122)
- Penalty minutes: Dale Hunter (265)
- Plus/minus: David Shaw (+14)
- Wins: Clint Malarchuk (26)
- Goals against average: Clint Malarchuk (3.21)

The 1985–86 Quebec Nordiques season was the Nordiques seventh season in the National Hockey League (NHL). The Nordiques, led by their new captain Peter Stastny, captured their first division title since the 1976–77 season but were swept of the first round of the playoffs by the Hartford Whalers.

== Offseason ==
The Nordiques had a pretty quiet off-season, with the only trade during the summer was acquiring John Anderson from the Toronto Maple Leafs for Brad Maxwell. Anderson was second in Leafs scoring with 32 goals and 63 points in 1984–85. Quebec also made a trade late in the pre-season, as the Nordiques acquired Gilbert Delorme from the St. Louis Blues for Bruce Bell. Delorme, a stay-at-home defenseman, had two goals and 14 points in 74 games with the Blues.

The Nordiques signed free agent Tony Currie from the Edmonton Oilers, while they lost Blake Wesley, who signed with the Toronto Maple Leafs.

== Regular season ==
The Nordiques started the season with a seven-game winning streak, however, the club fell into a slump, and had a 3-10-1 record in their next fourteen games to fall to 10–10–1. Quebec returned to their winning ways, going unbeaten in their next eight games, and found themselves battling with the Boston Bruins and Montreal Canadiens for first place in the Adams Division. The Nordiques fell into another slump, losing five of their next six games, however, the team then won seven in a row to improve to 25–15–2, and had a narrow two point lead over the Canadiens for first in the division. The Nordiques and Canadiens would continue to battle for the division title for the remainder of the season, and it was the Nordiques, who finished the year 43–31–6, earning 92 points, who came out of top to win the Adams Division for the first time in team history.

Offensively, Quebec was led by Peter Stastny, who led the club with 122 points, as he scored 41 goals and added 81 assists, to finish sixth in NHL scoring. Stastny also became the Nordiques captain in November, when the club traded away former captain Mario Marois to the Winnipeg Jets. Michel Goulet had his fourth consecutive 50+ goal season, as he finished in fifth in the league with 53 goals. Goulet added 51 assists to earn 104 points, breaking the 100 point barrier for the third time in four seasons. Anton Stastny had a solid season, scoring 31 goals and 74 points, while Dale Hunter earned 28 goals and 70 points, along with a club high 265 penalty minutes.

On defence, the Nordiques were led by Robert Picard, who earned 34 points in 48 games with Quebec after being acquired in the Mario Marois trade. Twenty-one-year-old David Shaw, in his first full NHL season, had seven goals and 26 points.

In goal, Clint Malarchuk emerged as the starter, as he won 26 games, a 3.21 GAA, and four shutouts, all team highs, in his first full NHL season.

=== Final standings ===
Adams Division
	GP	W	L	T	GF	GA	Pts
**Quebec Nordiques**	80	43	31	6	330	289	92
**Montreal Canadiens**	80	40	33	7	330	280	87
**Boston Bruins**	80	37	31	12	311	288	86
**Hartford Whalers**	80	40	36	4	332	302	84
Buffalo Sabres	80	37	37	6	296	291	80

Note: GP = Games played, W = Wins, L = Losses, T = Ties, Pts = Points, GF = Goals for, GA = Goals against
Note: Teams that qualified for the playoffs are highlighted in bold.

=== Record vs. opponents ===
Adams Division record vs. opponents

==== Vs. Wales Conference ====
**Vs. Adams Division**

1985–86 NHL records
Team	**BOS**	**BUF**	**HFD**	**MTL**	**QUE**	**Total**
Boston	—	3–3–2	4–3–1	3–4–1	1–5–2	**11–15–6**
Buffalo	3–3–2	—	2–6	3–5	4–4	**12–18–2**
Hartford	3–4–1	6–2	—	3–4–1	4–4	**16–14–2**
Montreal	4–3–1	5–3	4–3−1	—	2–6	**15–15–2**
Quebec	5–1–2	4–4	4–4	6–2	—	**19–11–2**

**Vs. Patrick Division**

1985–86 NHL records
Team	**NJD**	**NYI**	**NYR**	**PHI**	**PIT**	**WSH**	**Total**
Boston	3–0	0–1–2	1–2	1–2	2–1	0–2–1	**7–8–3**
Buffalo	2–1	2–1	3–0	2–1	0–2–1	1–1–1	**10–6–2**
Hartford	2–1	1–2	2–1	0–3	2–1	0–2–1	**7–10–1**
Montreal	2–1	2–1	0–2–1	1–2	2–0–1	0–2–1	**7–8–3**
Quebec	1–2	2–1	2–0–1	1–1–1	1–1–1	0–3	**7–8–3**

==== Vs. Campbell Conference ====
**Vs. Norris Division**

1985–86 NHL records
Team	**CHI**	**DET**	**MIN**	**STL**	**TOR**	**Total**
Boston	1–2	2–1	3–0	1–2	2–0–1	**9–5–1**
Buffalo	1–2	1–1–1	2–1	2–1	1–2	**7–7–1**
Hartford	1–2	2–1	1–2	1–1–1	3–0	**8–6–1**
Montreal	2–0–1	3–0	1–1–1	1–2	2–1	**9–4–2**
Quebec	2–1	2–1	2–1	1–2	3–0	**10–5–0**

**Vs. Smythe Division**

1985–86 NHL records
Team	**CGY**	**EDM**	**LAK**	**VAN**	**WIN**	**Total**
Boston	2–1	1–2	3–0	1–0–2	3–0	**10–3–2**
Buffalo	1–1–1	2–1	1–2	2–1	2–1	**8–6–1**
Hartford	2–1	0–3	2–1	3–0	2–1	**9–6–0**
Montreal	2–1	0–3	2–1	3–0	2–1	**9–6–0**
Quebec	2–1	1–2	2–1	1–1–1	1–2	**7–7–1**

== Schedule and results ==
1985–86 regular season
October

Game	Result	Date	Score	Opponent	Record	Attendance
1	W	October 10, 1985	6–2	Chicago Black Hawks (1985–86)	1–0–0	14,635
2	W	October 12, 1985	4–0	@ Toronto Maple Leafs (1985–86)	2–0–0	15,270
3	W	October 13, 1985	5–2	@ Winnipeg Jets (1985–86)	3–0–0	14,374
4	W	October 15, 1985	4–1	Hartford Whalers (1985–86)	4–0–0	12,666
5	W	October 17, 1985	2–1	@ Philadelphia Flyers (1985–86)	5–0–0	17,126
6	W	October 19, 1985	4–3	Pittsburgh Penguins (1985–86)	6–0–0	14,050
7	W	October 21, 1985	3–2	@ Montreal Canadiens (1985–86)	7–0–0	16,855
8	L	October 24, 1985	5–6	@ New York Islanders (1985–86)	7–1–0	15,211
9	T	October 26, 1985	4–4 OT	@ Pittsburgh Penguins (1985–86)	7–1–1	11,748
10	W	October 29, 1985	6–4	Montreal Canadiens (1985–86)	8–1–1	15,370
11	L	October 30, 1985	4–6	@ Hartford Whalers (1985–86)	8–2–1	11,014

November

Game	Result	Date	Score	Opponent	Record	Attendance
12	L	November 2, 1985	3–5	Philadelphia Flyers (1985–86)	8–3–1	14,678
13	W	November 5, 1985	7–5	Boston Bruins (1985–86)	9–3–1	14,835
14	L	November 9, 1985	3–4	Hartford Whalers (1985–86)	9–4–1	14,552
15	L	November 13, 1985	4–6	@ Chicago Black Hawks (1985–86)	9–5–1	16,797
16	L	November 14, 1985	3–5	@ St. Louis Blues (1985–86)	9–6–1	10,161
17	W	November 16, 1985	3–1	Buffalo Sabres (1985–86)	10–6–1	14,286
18	L	November 19, 1985	4–5	Edmonton Oilers (1985–86)	10–7–1	15,357
19	L	November 22, 1985	5–7	@ Buffalo Sabres (1985–86)	10–8–1	16,433
20	L	November 23, 1985	0–3	@ Washington Capitals (1985–86)	10–9–1	16,740
21	L	November 26, 1985	1–3	Calgary Flames (1985–86)	10–10–1	15,015
22	W	November 28, 1985	3–0	@ Boston Bruins (1985–86)	11–10–1	14,451
23	W	November 30, 1985	2–0	Boston Bruins (1985–86)	12–10–1	15,352

December

Game	Result	Date	Score	Opponent	Record	Attendance
24	W	December 4, 1985	5–4	Vancouver Canucks (1985–86)	13–10–1	13,644
25	W	December 6, 1985	7–3	New York Islanders (1985–86)	14–10–1	13,939
26	W	December 7, 1985	4–1	@ New York Islanders (1985–86)	15–10–1	15,960
27	W	December 10, 1985	7–3	Buffalo Sabres (1985–86)	16–10–1	13,792
28	T	December 12, 1985	1–1 OT	@ Boston Bruins (1985–86)	16–10–2	11,673
29	W	December 14, 1985	9–3	New Jersey Devils (1985–86)	17–10–2	13,738
30	L	December 15, 1985	2–6	@ Buffalo Sabres (1985–86)	17–11–2	12,186
31	L	December 18, 1985	2–3	@ Montreal Canadiens (1985–86)	17–12–2	18,050
32	W	December 19, 1985	5–4 OT	Montreal Canadiens (1985–86)	18–12–2	15,341
33	L	December 22, 1985	5–7	Washington Capitals (1985–86)	18–13–2	15,044
34	L	December 26, 1985	3–4	@ Washington Capitals (1985–86)	18–14–2	15,245
35	L	December 28, 1985	4–5	Detroit Red Wings (1985–86)	18–15–2	14,232
36	W	December 31, 1985	5–1	Hartford Whalers (1985–86)	19–15–2	13,644

January

Game	Result	Date	Score	Opponent	Record	Attendance
37	W	January 2, 1986	3–2	@ Hartford Whalers (1985–86)	20–15–2	11,664
38	W	January 4, 1986	7–2	@ Detroit Red Wings (1985–86)	21–15–2	17,849
39	W	January 5, 1986	5–4	@ New York Rangers (1985–86)	22–15–2	17,416
40	W	January 7, 1986	7–4	St. Louis Blues (1985–86)	23–15–2	14,039
41	W	January 10, 1986	5–3	Edmonton Oilers (1985–86)	24–15–2	15,358
42	W	January 11, 1986	5–1	@ Toronto Maple Leafs (1985–86)	25–15–2	16,382
43	L	January 14, 1986	4–5	Winnipeg Jets (1985–86)	25–16–2	13,848
44	L	January 17, 1986	6–11	@ Hartford Whalers (1985–86)	25–17–2	12,486
45	L	January 18, 1986	2–5	Hartford Whalers (1985–86)	25–18–2	15,012
46	W	January 20, 1986	3–2 OT	Montreal Canadiens (1985–86)	26–18–2	15,346
47	W	January 23, 1986	4–0	@ New York Rangers (1985–86)	27–18–2	17,412
48	W	January 25, 1986	4–3	Buffalo Sabres (1985–86)	28–18–2	15,351
49	T	January 27, 1986	6–6 OT	New York Rangers (1985–86)	28–18–3	14,308
50	L	January 29, 1986	3–5	@ Montreal Canadiens (1985–86)	28–19–3	17,983

February

Game	Result	Date	Score	Opponent	Record	Attendance
51	T	February 1, 1986	2–2 OT	Philadelphia Flyers (1985–86)	28–19–4	15,362
52	L	February 2, 1986	3–5	@ Buffalo Sabres (1985–86)	28–20–4	16,433
53	W	February 5, 1986	3–2	Montreal Canadiens (1985–86)	29–20–4	15,373
54	W	February 8, 1986	8–5	Chicago Black Hawks (1985–86)	30–20–4	15,351
55	W	February 9, 1986	4–3 OT	@ Boston Bruins (1985–86)	31–20–4	13,178
56	W	February 12, 1986	5–2	@ Los Angeles Kings (1985–86)	32–20–4	8,811
57	L	February 14, 1986	2–8	@ Edmonton Oilers (1985–86)	32–21–4	17,498
58	W	February 16, 1986	6–3	@ Calgary Flames (1985–86)	33–21–4	16,764
59	L	February 18, 1986	4–5	Los Angeles Kings (1985–86)	33–22–4	15,352
60	L	February 20, 1986	3–4 OT	@ New Jersey Devils (1985–86)	33–23–4	9,406
61	L	February 21, 1986	2–5	@ Minnesota North Stars (1985–86)	33–24–4	12,171
62	L	February 23, 1986	2–4	@ Winnipeg Jets (1985–86)	33–25–4	14,354
63	L	February 25, 1986	4–7	Boston Bruins (1985–86)	33–26–4	15,358
64	W	February 28, 1986	6–2	@ Buffalo Sabres (1985–86)	34–26–4	16,433

March

Game	Result	Date	Score	Opponent	Record	Attendance
65	L	March 1, 1986	4–8	Buffalo Sabres (1985–86)	34–27–4	15,371
66	L	March 4, 1986	3–6	St. Louis Blues (1985–86)	34–28–4	15,064
67	W	March 6, 1986	5–4 OT	@ Boston Bruins (1985–86)	35–28–4	13,045
68	W	March 8, 1986	6–3	@ Hartford Whalers (1985–86)	36–28–4	13,616
69	T	March 11, 1986	1–1 OT	Vancouver Canucks (1985–86)	36–28–5	15,065
70	W	March 14, 1986	6–2	Calgary Flames (1985–86)	37–28–5	15,142
71	W	March 15, 1986	3–2	Minnesota North Stars (1985–86)	38–28–5	15,357
72	W	March 17, 1986	8–6	@ Montreal Canadiens (1985–86)	39–28–5	18,092
73	W	March 19, 1986	5–2	Toronto Maple Leafs (1985–86)	40–28–5	15,139
74	L	March 22, 1986	4–7	Pittsburgh Penguins (1985–86)	40–29–5	15,368
75	W	March 24, 1986	1–0	@ Minnesota North Stars (1985–86)	41–29–5	15,953
76	L	March 26, 1986	6–7	@ Vancouver Canucks (1985–86)	41–30–5	8,458
77	W	March 29, 1986	5–3	@ Los Angeles Kings (1985–86)	42–30–5	10,984

April

Game	Result	Date	Score	Opponent	Record	Attendance
78	W	April 1, 1986	4–0	Detroit Red Wings (1985–86)	43–30–5	15,133
79	L	April 2, 1986	5–6	@ New Jersey Devils (1985–86)	43–31–5	7,813
80	T	April 5, 1986	2–2 OT	Boston Bruins (1985–86)	43–31–6	15,399

Legend: Win (2 points) Loss (0 points) Tie (1 point)

== Playoffs ==
The Nordiques opened the 1986 Stanley Cup playoffs with a best of five Adams Division semi-final series against the Hartford Whalers. Despite finishing the season with a 40-36-4 record, earning 84 points, the Whalers finished in fourth place in the Adams Division. The series opened with two games at Le Colisée, however, the Whalers stunned the Nordiques with a 3–2 overtime victory to win the first game. Hartford then took a 2–0 series lead, as they easily defeated the favoured Nordiques 4–1 in the second game. The series moved to the Hartford Civic Center for the third game. The Whalers continued to dominate in the third game, destroying Quebec 9–4, to sweep the first place Nordiques out of the post-season.

1986 Stanley Cup playoffs
Adams Division Semifinals vs. (A4) Hartford Whalers – Whalers win 3–0

Game	Date	Visitor	Score	Home	Series	Attendance
1	April 9	Hartford Whalers	3–2	Quebec Nordiques	0-1	14,504
2	April 10	Hartford Whalers	4–1	Quebec Nordiques	0-2	14,562
3	April 12	Quebec Nordiques	4–9	Hartford Whalers	0-3	15,126

Legend: Win Loss

== Player statistics ==
Regular season
Scoring

Player	Pos	GP	G	A	Pts	PIM	+/-	PPG	SHG	GWG
Peter Stastny	C	76	41	81	122	60	2	15	0	8
Michel Goulet	LW	75	53	51	104	64	6	28	0	3
Anton Stastny	LW	74	31	43	74	19	8	8	0	4
Dale Hunter	C	80	28	42	70	265	6	7	0	4
Brent Ashton	LW	77	26	32	58	64	7	5	2	5
Jean-Francois Sauve	C	75	16	40	56	20	-13	13	0	1
John Anderson	RW	65	21	28	49	26	-1	8	3	5
Paul Gillis	C	80	19	24	43	203	-2	0	2	2
Alain Cote	LW	78	13	21	34	29	-3	0	3	2
Robert Picard	D	48	7	27	34	36	-2	1	1	0
David Shaw	D	73	7	19	26	78	14	2	0	2
Mike Eagles	C/LW	73	11	12	23	49	3	1	0	1
Randy Moller	D	69	5	18	23	141	9	0	0	1
Mark Kumpel	RW	47	10	12	22	17	10	0	0	3
Gilbert Delorme	D	64	2	18	20	51	-1	1	0	0
Wilf Paiement	RW	44	7	12	19	145	0	2	0	0
Steve Patrick	RW	27	4	13	17	17	1	1	0	0
Pat Price	D	54	3	13	16	82	0	0	0	0
Mario Marois	D	20	1	12	13	42	-10	1	0	1
Wayne Babych	RW	15	6	5	11	18	0	1	0	0
Normand Rochefort	D	26	5	4	9	30	9	2	0	0
Peter Andersson	D	12	1	8	9	4	8	1	0	0
Greg Malone	C	27	3	5	8	18	-3	0	0	0
Risto Siltanen	D	13	2	5	7	6	-1	2	0	0
Daniel Poudrier	D	13	1	5	6	10	2	0	0	1
Jeff Brown	D	8	3	2	5	6	5	0	0	0
Gord Donnelly	D	36	2	2	4	85	0	0	0	0
Mario Gosselin	G	31	0	3	3	2	0	0	0	0
Jimmy Mann	RW	35	0	3	3	148	-2	0	0	0
Clint Malarchuk	G	46	0	2	2	21	0	0	0	0
Jean-Marc Gaulin	RW	1	1	0	1	0	0	0	0	0
Trevor Stienburg	RW	2	1	0	1	0	0	0	0	0
Steven Finn	D	17	0	1	1	28	0	0	0	0
Claude Julien	D	13	0	1	1	25	2	0	0	0
David Latta	LW	1	0	0	0	0	0	0	0	0
Alain Lemieux	C	7	0	0	0	2	-1	0	0	0
Richard Sevigny	G	11	0	0	0	8	0	0	0	0

Goaltending

Player	MIN	GP	W	L	T	GA	GAA	SO	SA	SV	SV%
Clint Malarchuk	2657	46	26	12	4	142	3.21	4	1358	1216	.895
Mario Gosselin	1726	31	14	14	1	111	3.86	2	796	685	.861
Richard Sevigny	468	11	3	5	1	33	4.23	0	242	209	.864
Team:	4851	80	43	31	6	286	3.54	6	2396	2110	.881

Playoffs
Scoring

Player	Pos	GP	G	A	Pts	PIM	+/-	PPG	SHG	GWG
Brent Ashton	LW	3	2	1	3	9	-1	0	1	0
Michel Goulet	LW	3	1	2	3	10	-2	1	0	0
Alain Lemieux	C	1	1	2	3	0	-1	1	0	0
Anton Stastny	LW	3	1	1	2	0	-5	0	0	0
Paul Gillis	C	3	0	2	2	14	0	0	0	0
Robert Picard	D	3	0	2	2	2	-4	0	0	0
Alain Cote	LW	3	1	0	1	0	-2	0	0	0
Mark Kumpel	RW	2	1	0	1	0	-1	0	0	0
Peter Andersson	D	2	0	1	1	0	-1	0	0	0
Pat Price	D	3	0	1	1	4	0	0	0	0
Risto Siltanen	D	3	0	1	1	2	-3	0	0	0
Peter Stastny	C	3	0	1	1	2	-5	0	0	0
Jeff Brown	D	1	0	0	0	0	0	0	0	0
Gilbert Delorme	D	2	0	0	0	5	-2	0	0	0
Gord Donnelly	D	1	0	0	0	0	-2	0	0	0
Mike Eagles	C/LW	3	0	0	0	2	-1	0	0	0
Mario Gosselin	G	1	0	0	0	0	0	0	0	0
Dale Hunter	C	3	0	0	0	15	-1	0	0	0
Clint Malarchuk	G	3	0	0	0	0	0	0	0	0
Greg Malone	C	1	0	0	0	0	-1	0	0	0
Jimmy Mann	RW	2	0	0	0	19	0	0	0	0
Randy Moller	D	3	0	0	0	26	-1	0	0	0
Steve Patrick	RW	3	0	0	0	6	-1	0	0	0
Jean-Francois Sauve	C	2	0	0	0	0	0	0	0	0
Trevor Stienburg	RW	1	0	0	0	0	-1	0	0	0

Goaltending

Player	MIN	GP	W	L	GA	GAA	SO	SA	SV	SV%
Mario Gosselin	40	1	0	1	5	7.50	0	22	17	.773
Clint Malarchuk	143	3	0	2	11	4.62	0	81	70	.864
Team:	183	3	0	3	16	5.25	0	103	87	.845

Note:

Pos = Position;GP = Games played; G = Goals; A = Assists; Pts = Points; PIM = Penalty minutes; +/- = Plus/minus; PPG = Power-play goals; SHG = Short-handed goals; GWG = Game-winning goals
Pos = Position;GP = Games played; Min, TOI = Minutes played; W = Wins; L = Losses; T,T/OT = Ties; OTL = Overtime losses; GA = Goals-against; GAA = Goals-against average; SO = Shutouts; SA = Shots against; SV = Shots saved;SV% = Save percentage;

== Awards and records ==
- First NHL All-Star team: Michel Goulet

== Transactions ==
The Nordiques were involved in the following transactions during the 1985–86 season.

=== Trades ===
August 21, 1985	To Toronto Maple Leafs Brad Maxwell	To Quebec Nordiques John Anderson
October 2, 1985	To St. Louis Blues Bruce Bell	To Quebec Nordiques Gilbert Delorme
October 14, 1985	To Winnipeg Jets Dan Bouchard	To Quebec Nordiques 7th round pick in 1986 – Mark Vermette; Cash
October 20, 1985	To Pittsburgh Penguins Future Considerations	To Quebec Nordiques Wayne Babych
November 15, 1985	To Minnesota North Stars Ed Lee	To Quebec Nordiques 6th round pick in 1986 – Scott White
November 27, 1985	To Winnipeg Jets Mario Marois	To Quebec Nordiques Robert Picard
January 16, 1986	To Calgary Flames Tom Thornbury	To Quebec Nordiques Tony Stiles
January 17, 1986	To Hartford Whalers Wayne Babych	To Quebec Nordiques Greg Malone
February 6, 1986	To New York Rangers Wilf Paiement	To Quebec Nordiques Steve Patrick
March 8, 1986	To Hartford Whalers John Anderson	To Quebec Nordiques Risto Siltanen
March 10, 1986	To Washington Capitals Peter Andersson	To Quebec Nordiques 3rd round pick in 1986 – Shawn Simpson
June 21, 1986	To Philadelphia Flyers 2nd round pick in 1987 – Jeff Harding	To Quebec Nordiques 2nd round pick in 1986 – Stephane Guerard

=== Free agents ===
Player / Former team; Tony Currie / Edmonton Oilers	Player / New team; Blake Wesley / Toronto Maple Leafs

== Draft picks ==
Quebec's draft picks from the 1985 NHL entry draft which was held at the Metro Toronto Convention Centre in Toronto, Ontario.

Round	#	Player	Nationality	College/junior/club team (league)
1	15	David Latta	Canada	Kitchener Rangers (OHL)
2	36	Jason Lafreniere	Canada	Hamilton Steelhawks (OHL)
3	57	Max Middendorf	United States	Sudbury Wolves (OHL)
4	65	Peter Massey	United States	New Hampton School (USHS)
4	78	David Espe	United States	White Bear Lake High School (USHS)
5	99	Bruce Major	Canada	Richmond Sockeyes (BCJHL)
6	120	Andy Akervik	United States	Eau Claire Memorial High School (USHS)
7	141	Mike Oliverio	Canada	Sault Ste. Marie Greyhounds (OHL)
8	162	Mario Brunetta	Canada	Quebec Remparts (QMJHL)
9	183	Brit Peer	Canada	Sault Ste. Marie Greyhounds (OHL)
10	204	Tom Sasso	United States	Babson College (NCAA)
11	225	Gary Murphy	United States	Arlington Catholic High School (USHS)
12	246	Jean Bois	Canada	Trois-Rivières Draveurs (QMJHL)

== Farm teams ==
- Fredericton Express (American Hockey League)

== See also ==
- 1985–86 NHL season
