= 1985–86 Los Angeles Kings season =

National Hockey League team season

1985–86 Los Angeles Kings
- Division: 5th Smythe
- Conference: 9th Campbell
- 1985–86 record: 23–49–8
- Home record: 9–27–4
- Road record: 14–22–4
- Goals for: 284
- Goals against: 389

Team information
- General manager: Rogatien Vachon
- Coach: Pat Quinn
- Captain: Dave Taylor
- Alternate captains: Marcel Dionne; Jay Wells
- Arena: The Forum

Team leaders
- Goals: Bernie Nicholls (36); Marcel Dionne (36)
- Assists: Bernie Nicholls (61)
- Points: Bernie Nicholls (97)
- Penalty minutes: Dave Tiger Williams (320)
- Plus/minus: Jay Wells (+7)
- Wins: Bob Janecyk (14)
- Goals against average: Rollie Melanson (4.19)

The 1985–86 Los Angeles Kings season was the Kings' 19th season in the National Hockey League (NHL). The Kings did not qualify for the playoffs for the seventh time in franchise history.

== Regular season ==
=== Season standings ===
Smythe Division
	GP	W	L	T	GF	GA	Pts
**Edmonton Oilers**	80	56	17	7	426	310	119
**Calgary Flames**	80	40	31	9	354	315	89
**Winnipeg Jets**	80	26	47	7	295	372	59
**Vancouver Canucks**	80	23	44	13	282	333	59
Los Angeles Kings	80	23	49	8	284	389	54

Note: GP = Games played, W = Wins, L = Losses, T = Ties, Pts = Points, GF = Goals for, GA = Goals against
Note: Teams that qualified for the playoffs are highlighted in bold.

=== Record vs. opponents ===
Smythe Division record vs. opponents

==== Vs. Campbell Conference ====
**Vs. Smythe Division**

1985–86 NHL records
Team	**CGY**	**EDM**	**LAK**	**VAN**	**WIN**	**Total**
Calgary	—	1−6−1	7−1	4−2−2	6−1−1	**18−10−4**
Edmonton	6−1−1	—	6−0−2	7−0−1	6−2	**25−3−4**
Los Angeles	1−7	0−6−2	—	1−5−2	5−2−1	**7−20−5**
Vancouver	2−4−2	0−7−1	5−1−2	—	3−3−2	**10−15−7**
Winnipeg	1−6−1	2−6	2−5−1	3−3−2	—	**8−20−4**

**Vs. Norris Division**

1985–86 NHL records
Team	**CHI**	**DET**	**MIN**	**STL**	**TOR**	**Total**
Calgary	1−2	2−0−1	0−2−1	1−2	2−1	**6−7−2**
Edmonton	3−0	3−0	2−1	1−1−1	2−1	**11−3−1**
Los Angeles	0−1−2	1−2	2−1	1−1−1	2−1	**6−6−3**
Vancouver	0−3	3−0	2−1	0−3	2−0−1	**7−7−1**
Winnipeg	1−2	3−0	2−1	1−2	1−1−1	**8−6−1**

**Vs. Wales Conference**

**Vs. Adams Division**

1985–86 NHL records
Team	**BOS**	**BUF**	**HFD**	**MTL**	**QUE**	**Total**
Calgary	1−2	1−1−1	1−2	1−2	1−2	**5−9−1**
Edmonton	2−1	1−2	3−0	3−0	2−1	**11−4−0**
Los Angeles	0−3	2−1	1−2	1−2	1−2	**5−10−0**
Vancouver	0−1−2	1−2	0−3	0−3	1−1−1	**2−10−3**
Winnipeg	0−3	1−2	1−2	1−2	2−1	**5−10−0**

**Vs. Patrick Division**

1985–86 NHL records
Team	**NJD**	**NYI**	**NYR**	**PHI**	**PIT**	**WSH**	**Total**
Calgary	2−0−1	1−1−1	2−1	1−2	2−1	3−0	**11−5−2**
Edmonton	3−0	1−0−2	1−2	2−1	2−1	0−3	**9−7−2**
Los Angeles	1−2	1−2	1−2	0−3	1−2	1−2	**5−13−0**
Vancouver	1−2	1−1−1	0−3	1−2	1−2	0−2−1	**4−12−2**
Winnipeg	1−2	0−2−1	1−2	1−2	1−2	1−1−1	**5−11−2**

== Schedule and results ==
1985–86 regular season
October

Game	Result	Date	Score	Opponent	Record
1	L	October 10, 1985	5–6	Vancouver Canucks (1985–86)	0–1–0
2	L	October 12, 1985	4–5 OT	New York Islanders (1985–86)	0–2–0
3	L	October 13, 1985	2–9	Calgary Flames (1985–86)	0–3–0
4	W	October 16, 1985	4–3	New York Rangers (1985–86)	1–3–0
5	L	October 18, 1985	4–5	@ Vancouver Canucks (1985–86)	1–4–0
6	L	October 20, 1985	5–8	Edmonton Oilers (1985–86)	1–5–0
7	L	October 22, 1985	2–5	Boston Bruins (1985–86)	1–6–0
8	L	October 25, 1985	0–5	@ New York Rangers (1985–86)	1–7–0
9	L	October 26, 1985	2–5	@ New Jersey Devils (1985–86)	1–8–0
10	W	October 29, 1985	3–2	@ New York Islanders (1985–86)	2–8–0
11	L	October 31, 1985	4–7	@ Boston Bruins (1985–86)	2–9–0

November

Game	Result	Date	Score	Opponent	Record
12	W	November 2, 1985	8–1	@ Hartford Whalers (1985–86)	3–9–0
13	L	November 3, 1985	4–7	@ Philadelphia Flyers (1985–86)	3–10–0
14	T	November 6, 1985	4–4 OT	Edmonton Oilers (1985–86)	3–10–1
15	L	November 9, 1985	0–6	Montreal Canadiens (1985–86)	3–11–1
16	L	November 13, 1985	2–7	Detroit Red Wings (1985–86)	3–12–1
17	W	November 16, 1985	4–3 OT	Pittsburgh Penguins (1985–86)	4–12–1
18	L	November 19, 1985	3–6	New Jersey Devils (1985–86)	4–13–1
19	W	November 21, 1985	5–4 OT	@ Detroit Red Wings (1985–86)	5–13–1
20	L	November 23, 1985	2–4	@ Minnesota North Stars (1985–86)	5–14–1
21	T	November 24, 1985	4–4 OT	@ Chicago Black Hawks (1985–86)	5–14–2
22	L	November 27, 1985	0–9	Hartford Whalers (1985–86)	5–15–2
23	T	November 30, 1985	4–4 OT	Chicago Black Hawks (1985–86)	5–15–3

December

Game	Result	Date	Score	Opponent	Record
24	L	December 3, 1985	4–8	Edmonton Oilers (1985–86)	5–16–3
25	T	December 5, 1985	6–6 OT	@ Edmonton Oilers (1985–86)	5–16–4
26	W	December 7, 1985	3–2	@ Winnipeg Jets (1985–86)	6–16–4
27	W	December 8, 1985	4–1	@ Winnipeg Jets (1985–86)	7–16–4
28	L	December 10, 1985	5–6	@ Calgary Flames (1985–86)	7–17–4
29	L	December 12, 1985	0–5	@ Calgary Flames (1985–86)	7–18–4
30	L	December 14, 1985	4–5	Washington Capitals (1985–86)	7–19–4
31	W	December 18, 1985	4–3	Toronto Maple Leafs (1985–86)	8–19–4
32	L	December 20, 1985	4–9	@ Edmonton Oilers (1985–86)	8–20–4
33	L	December 21, 1985	2–6	Vancouver Canucks (1985–86)	8–21–4
34	W	December 28, 1985	5–4	Winnipeg Jets (1985–86)	9–21–4
35	W	December 30, 1985	4–2	Winnipeg Jets (1985–86)	10–21–4

January

Game	Result	Date	Score	Opponent	Record
36	L	January 2, 1986	4–7	Philadelphia Flyers (1985–86)	10–22–4
37	W	January 4, 1986	6–4	@ Toronto Maple Leafs (1985–86)	11–22–4
38	W	January 5, 1986	3–2	@ Buffalo Sabres (1985–86)	12–22–4
39	L	January 8, 1986	3–7	@ Pittsburgh Penguins (1985–86)	12–23–4
40	W	January 10, 1986	4–3	@ Minnesota North Stars (1985–86)	13–23–4
41	T	January 11, 1986	4–4 OT	@ St. Louis Blues (1985–86)	13–23–5
42	L	January 15, 1986	3–4	New York Rangers (1985–86)	13–24–5
43	W	January 17, 1986	9–7	@ Vancouver Canucks (1985–86)	14–24–5
44	T	January 18, 1986	4–4 OT	Vancouver Canucks (1985–86)	14–24–6
45	W	January 21, 1986	6–3	St. Louis Blues (1985–86)	15–24–6
46	L	January 23, 1986	3–4	St. Louis Blues (1985–86)	15–25–6
47	L	January 25, 1986	2–5	@ Edmonton Oilers (1985–86)	15–26–6
48	L	January 27, 1986	3–6	@ Calgary Flames (1985–86)	15–27–6
49	W	January 29, 1986	4–3	Minnesota North Stars (1985–86)	16–27–6

February

Game	Result	Date	Score	Opponent	Record
50	W	February 1, 1986	9–6	@ Winnipeg Jets (1985–86)	17–27–6
51	L	February 2, 1986	3–6	@ Winnipeg Jets (1985–86)	17–28–6
52	L	February 6, 1986	2–7	@ Calgary Flames (1985–86)	17–29–6
53	L	February 8, 1986	3–4	New York Islanders (1985–86)	17–30–6
54	L	February 9, 1986	3–7	Calgary Flames (1985–86)	17–31–6
55	L	February 12, 1986	2–5	Quebec Nordiques (1985–86)	17–32–6
56	L	February 15, 1986	1–4	Washington Capitals (1985–86)	17–33–6
57	W	February 17, 1986	3–2 OT	@ Montreal Canadiens (1985–86)	18–33–6
58	W	February 18, 1986	5–4	@ Quebec Nordiques (1985–86)	19–33–6
59	L	February 20, 1986	3–5	@ Philadelphia Flyers (1985–86)	19–34–6
60	W	February 22, 1986	5–2	@ New Jersey Devils (1985–86)	20–34–6
61	L	February 24, 1986	5–6 OT	@ Pittsburgh Penguins (1985–86)	20–35–6
62	L	February 27, 1986	3–6	Chicago Black Hawks (1985–86)	20–36–6

March

Game	Result	Date	Score	Opponent	Record
63	L	March 1, 1986	4–6	Montreal Canadiens (1985–86)	20–37–6
64	L	March 2, 1986	1–5	Calgary Flames (1985–86)	20–38–6
65	L	March 5, 1986	3–6	@ Edmonton Oilers (1985–86)	20–39–6
66	T	March 6, 1986	5–5 OT	@ Vancouver Canucks (1985–86)	20–39–7
67	L	March 9, 1986	3–7	Edmonton Oilers (1985–86)	20–40–7
68	L	March 12, 1986	0–3	Detroit Red Wings (1985–86)	20–41–7
69	W	March 15, 1986	5–3	Buffalo Sabres (1985–86)	21–41–7
70	L	March 17, 1986	6–7	@ Toronto Maple Leafs (1985–86)	21–42–7
71	W	March 18, 1986	5–2	@ Washington Capitals (1985–86)	22–42–7
72	L	March 20, 1986	3–6	@ Boston Bruins (1985–86)	22–43–7
73	L	March 22, 1986	3–6	@ Hartford Whalers (1985–86)	22–44–7
74	L	March 23, 1986	1–6	@ Buffalo Sabres (1985–86)	22–45–7
75	W	March 26, 1986	7–3	Calgary Flames (1985–86)	23–45–7
76	L	March 28, 1986	1–2 OT	@ Vancouver Canucks (1985–86)	23–46–7
77	L	March 29, 1986	3–5	Quebec Nordiques (1985–86)	23–47–7
78	L	March 31, 1986	2–5	Winnipeg Jets (1985–86)	23–48–7

April

Game	Result	Date	Score	Opponent	Record
79	T	April 2, 1986	4–4 OT	Winnipeg Jets (1985–86)	23–48–8
80	L	April 5, 1986	3–5	Vancouver Canucks (1985–86)	23–49–8

Legend: Win (2 points) Loss (0 points) Tie (1 point)

== Player statistics ==
Regular season
Scoring

Player	Pos	GP	G	A	Pts	PIM	+/-	PPG	SHG	GWG
Bernie Nicholls	C	80	36	61	97	78	-5	10	4	0
Marcel Dionne	C	80	36	58	94	42	-22	11	0	4
Dave Taylor	RW	76	33	38	71	110	-16	11	0	1
Tiger Williams	LW	72	20	29	49	320	-6	5	0	1
Phil Sykes	LW	76	20	24	44	97	-26	1	2	4
Bryan Erickson	RW	55	20	23	43	36	1	6	0	4
Jay Wells	D	79	11	31	42	226	7	4	0	2
Jim Fox	RW	39	14	17	31	2	-9	2	0	0
Joe Paterson	LW	47	9	18	27	153	-7	2	0	1
Mark Hardy	D	55	6	21	27	71	-11	2	1	1
Grant Ledyard	D	52	7	18	25	78	-22	4	0	2
Craig Redmond	D	73	6	18	24	57	-34	3	0	0
Garry Galley	D	49	9	13	22	46	-9	1	0	1
Morris Lukowich	LW	55	11	9	20	51	-19	0	0	0
Doug Smith	C	48	8	9	17	56	-29	1	1	0
Brian Engblom	D	49	3	13	16	61	-13	0	0	0
John Paul Kelly	LW	61	6	9	15	50	-17	0	0	0
Brian MacLellan	LW	27	5	8	13	19	-13	4	0	0
Brian Wilks	C	43	4	8	12	25	-7	0	0	0
Dean Kennedy	D	78	2	10	12	132	-10	0	0	0
Paul Guay	RW	23	3	3	6	18	-6	0	0	0
Len Hachborn	C	24	4	1	5	2	-9	1	0	0
Anders Hakansson	LW	38	4	1	5	8	-8	0	0	2
Bob Mongrain	C	11	2	3	5	2	-3	0	0	0
Sean McKenna	RW	30	4	0	4	7	-15	0	1	0
Rick Lapointe	D	20	0	4	4	18	-13	0	0	0
Glen Currie	C	12	1	2	3	9	0	1	0	0
Bob Janecyk	G	38	0	2	2	11	0	0	0	0
Dan Brennan	LW	6	0	1	1	9	-1	0	0	0
Craig Duncanson	LW	2	0	1	1	0	-1	0	0	0
Darren Eliot	G	27	0	1	1	4	0	0	0	0
Ken Hammond	D	3	0	1	1	2	-1	0	0	0
Roland Melanson	G	22	0	1	1	8	0	0	0	0
Lyle Phair	LW	15	0	1	1	2	-12	0	0	0
Larry Playfair	D	14	0	1	1	26	-14	0	0	0
Al Tuer	D	45	0	1	1	150	-16	0	0	0
Dave Gans	C	3	0	0	0	2	0	0	0	0
Glenn Healy	G	1	0	0	0	0	0	0	0	0

Goaltending

Player	MIN	GP	W	L	T	GA	GAA	SO	SA	SV	SV%
Bob Janecyk	2083	38	14	16	4	162	4.67	0	1130	968	.857
Darren Eliot	1481	27	5	17	3	121	4.90	0	801	680	.849
Roland Melanson	1246	22	4	16	1	87	4.19	0	654	567	.867
Glenn Healy	51	1	0	0	0	6	7.06	0	35	29	.829
Team:	4861	80	23	49	8	376	4.64	0	2620	2244	.856

Note:

Pos = Position;GP = Games played; G = Goals; A = Assists; Pts = Points; PIM = Penalty minutes; +/- = Plus/minus; PPG = Power-play goals; SHG = Short-handed goals; GWG = Game-winning goals
Pos = Position;GP = Games played; Min, TOI = Minutes played; W = Wins; L = Losses; T,T/OT = Ties; OTL = Overtime losses; GA = Goals-against; GAA = Goals-against average; SO = Shutouts; SA = Shots against; SV = Shots saved;SV% = Save percentage;

== Transactions ==
The Kings were involved in the following transactions during the 1985–86 season.

=== Trades ===
May 31, 1985	To Los Angeles Kings Dean Hopkins	To Edmonton Oilers Future considerations
September 9, 1985	To Los Angeles Kings Glen Currie	To Washington Capitals Daryl Evans
October 11, 1985	To Los Angeles Kings Paul Guay; 4th round pick in 1986 – Sylvain Couturier	To Philadelphia Flyers Steve Seguin; 2nd round pick in 1986 – Jukka Seppo
October 31, 1985	To Los Angeles Kings Bryan Erickson	To Washington Capitals Bruce Shoebottom
December 6, 1985	To Los Angeles Kings Len Hachborn	To Philadelphia Flyers Cash
December 9, 1985	To Los Angeles Kings Roland Melanson; Grant Ledyard	To New York Rangers Brian MacLellan; 4th round pick in 1987 – Mike Sullivan
December 18, 1985	To Los Angeles Kings Joe Paterson	To Philadelphia Flyers 4th round pick in 1986 – Mark Bar
January 29, 1986	To Los Angeles Kings Larry Playfair; Sean McKenna; Ken Baumgartner	To Buffalo Sabres Brian Engblom; Doug Smith
April 22, 1986	To Los Angeles Kings 3rd round pick in 1987 – Ross Wilson	To Buffalo Sabres 8th round pick in 1987 – Tim Roberts

=== Free agent signings ===
June 7, 1985	From Michigan State University (CCHA) Lyle Phair
March 4, 1986	From EHC Kloten (NL) Bob Mongrain

=== Free agents lost ===
July 23, 1985	To Philadelphia Flyers Carl Mokosak
September 11, 1985	To New Jersey Devils Archie Henderson
September 27, 1985	To Edmonton Oilers Dean Hopkins

=== Waivers ===
June 18, 1985	To Montreal Canadiens Steve Shutt
November 15, 1985	From Boston Bruins Morris Lukowich

== Draft picks ==
Round #	Pick #	Player	Position	Nationality	College/junior/club team
1	9	Craig Duncanson	Left wing	Canada	Sudbury Wolves (OHL)
1	10	Dan Gratton	Center	Canada	Oshawa Generals (OHL)
2	30	Par Edlund	Left wing	Sweden	IF Björklöven (Sweden)
4	72	Perry Florio	Defense	United States	Kent High School, Connecticut
5	93	Petr Prajsler	Defense	Czechoslovakia	LTC Pardubice (Czechoslovakia)
7	135	Tim Flanagan	Center	Canada	Michigan Technological University (WCHA)
8	156	John Hyduke	Goaltender	Canada	Hibbing High School (USHS-MN)
9	177	Steve Horner	Right wing	Canada	Henry Carr Crusaders (MetJHL)
11	219	Trent Ciprick	Right wing	Canada	Brandon Wheat Kings (WHL)
12	240	Marian Horvath	Left wing	Czechoslovakia	Bratislava Slovan (Czechoslovakia)
