= Ryan Stewart (ice hockey) =

Canadian ice hockey player (born 1967)

- Born: June 1, 1967 (age 59) Kelowna, British Columbia, Canada
- Height: 6 ft 1 in (185 cm)
- Weight: 190 lb (86 kg; 13 st 8 lb)
- Position: Centre
- Shot: Right
- Played for: Winnipeg Jets
- NHL draft: 18th overall, 1985; Winnipeg Jets
- Playing career: 1982–1993

Ryan Stewart (born June 1, 1967) is a Canadian former ice hockey centre. He played three games in the National Hockey League for the Winnipeg Jets during the 1985–86 season scoring one goal.

== Career statistics ==
=== Regular season and playoffs ===
| | | | Regular season | | | | | Playoffs |
| Season | Team | League | GP | G | A | Pts | PIM | GP | G | A | Pts | PIM |
|---|---|---|---|---|---|---|---|---|---|---|---|---|
| 1982–83 | Sherwood Park Crusaders | AJHL | 70 | 18 | 32 | 50 | 30 | — | — | — | — | — |
| 1983–84 | Kamloops Junior Oilers | WHL | 69 | 31 | 38 | 69 | 88 | 16 | 7 | 7 | 14 | 19 |
| 1984–85 | Kamloops Blazers | WHL | 54 | 33 | 37 | 70 | 92 | 11 | 6 | 6 | 12 | 34 |
| 1985–86 | Winnipeg Jets | NHL | 3 | 1 | 0 | 1 | 0 | — | — | — | — | — |
| 1985–86 | Kamloops Blazers | WHL | 10 | 7 | 11 | 18 | 27 | — | — | — | — | — |
| 1985–86 | Prince Albert Raiders | WHL | 52 | 45 | 33 | 78 | 55 | 15 | 7 | 8 | 15 | 21 |
| 1986–87 | Brandon Wheat Kings | WHL | 15 | 7 | 9 | 16 | 15 | — | — | — | — | — |
| 1986–87 | Portland Winter Hawks | WHL | 7 | 5 | 2 | 7 | 12 | 17 | 7 | 11 | 18 | 34 |
| 1987–88 | Moncton Hawks | AHL | 48 | 5 | 18 | 23 | 83 | — | — | — | — | — |
| 1988–89 | Moncton Hawks | AHL | 1 | 0 | 0 | 0 | 0 | — | — | — | — | — |
| 1988–89 | Maine Mariners | AHL | 7 | 1 | 0 | 1 | 7 | — | — | — | — | — |
| 1990–91 | Albany Choppers | IHL | 1 | 0 | 0 | 0 | 10 | — | — | — | — | — |
| 1991–92 | Swindon Wildcats | GBR-2 | 34 | 79 | 65 | 144 | 135 | 6 | 20 | 13 | 33 | 10 |
| 1992–93 | Swindon Wildcats | GBR-2 | 31 | 71 | 57 | 128 | 66 | 6 | 8 | 5 | 13 | 6 |
| NHL totals | | | 3 | 1 | 0 | 1 | 0 | — | — | — | — | — |
| AHL totals | | | 56 | 6 | 18 | 24 | 90 | — | — | — | — | — |

== Coaching statistics ==
Season  Team                Lge   Type  
1993-94 Merritt Centennials BCJHL Assistant Coach 
1997-98 Kelowna Rockets     WHL   Assistant Coach 

| Preceded by Bobby Dollas | Winnipeg Jets first-round draft pick 1985 | Succeeded by Pat Elynuik |
