= Bob Crawford (ice hockey) =

Canadian ice hockey player

- Born: April 6, 1959 (age 65); Belleville, Ontario, Canada
- Height: 5 ft 11 in (180 cm)
- Weight: 180 lb (82 kg; 12 st 12 lb)
- Position: Right wing
- Shot: Right
- Played for: St. Louis Blues; Hartford Whalers; New York Rangers; Washington Capitals
- NHL draft: 65th overall, 1979; St. Louis Blues
- Playing career: 1979–1989

Robert Remi "Bob" Crawford (born April 6, 1959) is a Canadian-born American former professional ice hockey player and coach. He played seven seasons in the National Hockey League between 1979 and 1987 with the St. Louis Blues, Hartford Whalers, New York Rangers, Washington Capitals. After retiring as a player Crawford turned to coaching at the youth level. Two of his brothers, Marc and Lou, also played in the NHL. Internationally Crawford played for the United States junior team at three World Junior Championships.

== Career statistics ==
=== Regular season and playoffs ===
			Regular season					Playoffs
Season	Team	League	GP	G	A	Pts	PIM	GP	G	A	Pts	PIM
1976–77	Cornwall Royals	QMJHL	71	36	34	70	39	12	5	5	10	0
1977–78	Cornwall Royals	QMJHL	69	54	67	121	29	9	7	5	12	2
1978–79	Cornwall Royals	QMJHL	65	62	70	132	43	7	4	7	11	6
1979–80	St. Louis Blues	NHL	8	1	0	1	2	—6	—	—	—	—
1979–80	Salt Lake Golden Eagles	CHL	67	30	21	51	32	13	3	5	8	9
1980–81	Salt Lake Golden Eagles	CHL	67	30	21	51	32	13	3	5	8	9
1981–82	St. Louis Blues	NHL	3	0	1	1	0	—4	—	—	—	—
1981–82	Salt Lake Golden Eagles	CHL	74	54	45	99	43	10	4	2	6	12
1982–83	St. Louis Blues	NHL	27	5	9	14	2	4	0	0	0	0
1982–83	Salt Lake Golden Eagles	CHL	25	15	23	38	2	—	—	—	—	—
1983–84	Hartford Whalers	NHL	80	36	25	61	32	—	—	—	—	—
1984–85	Hartford Whalers	NHL	45	14	14	0	8	—	—	—	—	—
1985–86	Hartford Whalers	NHL	57	14	20	34	16	—	—	—	—	—
1985–86	New York Rangers	NHL	11	1	2	3	10	7	0	1	1	8
1985–86	New Haven Nighthawks	AHL	0	7	0	15	6	5	0	0	0	2
1986–87	New York Rangers	NHL	3	0	0	0	2	—	—	—	—	—
1986–87	New Haven Nighthawks	AHL	4	3	3	7	—	—	—	—	—
1986–87	Washington Capitals	NHL	12	0	0	0	0	—	—	—	—	—
1986–87	Binghamton Whalers	AHL	5	0	2	2	0	—	—	—	—	—
1986–87	Salt Lake Golden Eagles	IHL	2	0	1	0	0	—	—	—	—	—
1987–88	Krefelder EV 1981	GER-2	7	7	25	64	37	—	—	—	—	—
1988–89	Krefelder EV 1981	GER-2	2	0	27	0	39	—	—	—	—	—
NHL totals			246	71	71	142	72	11	0	1	1	8

=== International ===
Year	Team	Event	GP	G	A	Pts	PIM
1977	United States	WJC	—	—	—	—	—
1978	United States	WJC	6	4	9	13	4
1979	United States	WJC	5	1	2	3	2
Junior totals			11	5	11	16	6

== Coaching career ==
Crawford's coaching career saw him win multiple championships. He helped the Connecticut Junior Clippers/Wolfpack become one of the top programs in the United States, with over 150 of his players graduating to NCAA Division I college hockey. In 2001 the Clippers won the US National Championship. He also worked on the Board of Directors for USA Hockey, serving as the New England Director.

Crawford also coached East Catholic High School in Manchester, Connecticut.

Outside of coaching, Crawford was the owner/operator of the multi-rink/fitness facility Champions Skating Center which includes the New England Athletic Club, a 35,000 square-foot center that includes a 6-lane, 25-meter pool. He also bought the Bolton Ice Palace and ISCC the International Skating Center of Connecticut. Crawford also worked as director and developer of The City of Hartford "Winterfest" Ice Arena, located outdoors in Hartford's Bushnell Park.
