= 1985–86 Edmonton Oilers season =

NHL team season

1985–86 Edmonton Oilers
- Presidents' Trophy winners
- Smythe Division champions
- Division: 1st Smythe
- Conference: 1st Campbell
- 1985–86 record: 56–17–7
- Home record: 32–6–2
- Road record: 24–11–5
- Goals for: 426
- Goals against: 310

Team information
- General manager: Glen Sather
- Coach: Glen Sather
- Captain: Wayne Gretzky
- Alternate captains: Lee Fogolin; Mark Messier
- Arena: Northlands Coliseum
- Average attendance: 17,358 (99.2%)
- Minor league affiliate: Nova Scotia Oilers (AHL)

Team leaders
- Goals: Jari Kurri (68)
- Assists: Wayne Gretzky (163)
- Points: Wayne Gretzky (215)
- Penalty minutes: Kevin McClelland (266)
- Plus/minus: Wayne Gretzky (+71)
- Wins: Grant Fuhr (29)
- Goals against average: Andy Moog (3.69)

The 1985–86 Edmonton Oilers season was the Oilers' seventh season in the NHL, and they were coming off back to back Stanley Cup Championships. Edmonton won the inaugural Presidents' Trophy, as they finished with 119 points, which was a league high and tied the franchise record which was set in the 1983–84 season. The Oilers won the Smythe Division for the 5th consecutive season, and were heavy favourites to win their third-straight Stanley Cup. It was also the fifth consecutive season in which they scored at least 400 goals. However, the Oilers were defeated by the Calgary Flames in the second round.

== Regular season ==
During the season, the Oilers had to deal with some legal issues. Dave Hunter was convicted three times in a span of less than two years for impaired driving. Mark Messier had his automobile troubles too, getting a fine after hitting three parked cars with his Porsche. Finally, the Oilers signed Craig MacTavish, who had missed the 1984–85 NHL season while serving a year in jail for vehicular homicide. Despite these distractions, the Oilers still finished first overall in the NHL.

Wayne Gretzky set an NHL record by earning 215 points and 163 assists, breaking records that he had previously set, as he won his sixth Art Ross Trophy and his seventh Hart Trophy. Jari Kurri became the first Oiler other than Gretzky to lead the team in goals as he scored 68 goals, and added 63 assists to finish with 131 points. Paul Coffey set the record for most goals (48) by a defenceman, breaking the record of 46 goals that Bobby Orr had previously set while finishing the season with 138 points, which was one point behind Orr's all-time defenceman record of 139 points. He won his second straight Norris Trophy.

In goal, Grant Fuhr and Andy Moog once again split time, with Fuhr leading the team with 29 wins, while Moog posted a team best 3.69 GAA.

=== Season standings ===
Smythe Division
	GP	W	L	T	GF	GA	Pts
**Edmonton Oilers**	80	56	17	7	426	310	119
**Calgary Flames**	80	40	31	9	354	315	89
**Winnipeg Jets**	80	26	47	7	295	372	59
**Vancouver Canucks**	80	23	44	13	282	333	59
Los Angeles Kings	80	23	49	8	284	389	54

Note: GP = Games played, W = Wins, L = Losses, T = Ties, Pts = Points, GF = Goals for, GA = Goals against
Note: Teams that qualified for the playoffs are highlighted in bold.

=== Record vs. opponents ===
Smythe Division record vs. opponents

==== Vs. Campbell Conference ====
**Vs. Smythe Division**

1985–86 NHL records
Team	**CGY**	**EDM**	**LAK**	**VAN**	**WIN**	**Total**
Calgary	—	1−6−1	7−1	4−2−2	6−1−1	**18−10−4**
Edmonton	6−1−1	—	6−0−2	7−0−1	6−2	**25−3−4**
Los Angeles	1−7	0−6−2	—	1−5−2	5−2−1	**7−20−5**
Vancouver	2−4−2	0−7−1	5−1−2	—	3−3−2	**10−15−7**
Winnipeg	1−6−1	2−6	2−5−1	3−3−2	—	**8−20−4**

**Vs. Norris Division**

1985–86 NHL records
Team	**CHI**	**DET**	**MIN**	**STL**	**TOR**	**Total**
Calgary	1−2	2−0−1	0−2−1	1−2	2−1	**6−7−2**
Edmonton	3−0	3−0	2−1	1−1−1	2−1	**11−3−1**
Los Angeles	0−1−2	1−2	2−1	1−1−1	2−1	**6−6−3**
Vancouver	0−3	3−0	2−1	0−3	2−0−1	**7−7−1**
Winnipeg	1−2	3−0	2−1	1−2	1−1−1	**8−6−1**

**Vs. Wales Conference**

**Vs. Adams Division**

1985–86 NHL records
Team	**BOS**	**BUF**	**HFD**	**MTL**	**QUE**	**Total**
Calgary	1−2	1−1−1	1−2	1−2	1−2	**5−9−1**
Edmonton	2−1	1−2	3−0	3−0	2−1	**11−4−0**
Los Angeles	0−3	2−1	1−2	1−2	1−2	**5−10−0**
Vancouver	0−1−2	1−2	0−3	0−3	1−1−1	**2−10−3**
Winnipeg	0−3	1−2	1−2	1−2	2−1	**5−10−0**

**Vs. Patrick Division**

1985–86 NHL records
Team	**NJD**	**NYI**	**NYR**	**PHI**	**PIT**	**WSH**	**Total**
Calgary	2−0−1	1−1−1	2−1	1−2	2−1	3−0	**11−5−2**
Edmonton	3−0	1−0−2	1−2	2−1	2−1	0−3	**9−7−2**
Los Angeles	1−2	1−2	1−2	0−3	1−2	1−2	**5−13−0**
Vancouver	1−2	1−1−1	0−3	1−2	1−2	0−2−1	**4−12−2**
Winnipeg	1−2	0−2−1	1−2	1−2	1−2	1−1−1	**5−11−2**

== Schedule and results ==
1985–86 regular season
October: 8–1–0 (home: 6–0–0; road: 2–1–0)

#	Date	Visitor	Score	Home	OT	Decision	Attendance	Record	Points	Recap
1	October 10	Winnipeg Jets	3 – 4	Edmonton Oilers		Fuhr	17,498	1–0–0	2	
2	October 13	St. Louis Blues	3 – 6	Edmonton Oilers		Moog	17,392	2–0–0	4	
3	October 16	New York Islanders	4 – 6	Edmonton Oilers		Fuhr	17,311	3–0–0	6	
4	October 18	Boston Bruins	2 – 3	Edmonton Oilers		Moog	17,327	4–0–0	8	
5	October 20	Edmonton Oilers	8 – 5	Los Angeles Kings		Fuhr	10,530	5–0–0	10	
6	October 23	Edmonton Oilers	3 – 9	Winnipeg Jets			13,269	5–1–0	10	
7	October 25	Calgary Flames	3 – 5	Edmonton Oilers		Fuhr	17,498	6–1–0	12	
8	October 28	Edmonton Oilers	6 – 4	Calgary Flames		Moog	16,762	7–1–0	14	
9	October 30	Winnipeg Jets	3 – 7	Edmonton Oilers		Fuhr	17,243	8–1–0	16	

November: 8–3–3 (home: 4–1–1; road: 4–2–2)

#	Date	Visitor	Score	Home	OT	Decision	Attendance	Record	Points	Recap
10	November 1	Buffalo Sabres	2 – 0	Edmonton Oilers		Moog	17,184	8–2–0	16	
11	November 3	Toronto Maple Leafs	1 – 7	Edmonton Oilers			17,177	9–2–0	18	
12	November 5	Edmonton Oilers	6 – 4	Vancouver Canucks		Moog	16,553	10–2–0	20	
13	November 6	Edmonton Oilers	4 – 4	Los Angeles Kings	OT	Moog	10,677	10–2–1	21	
14	November 8	Vancouver Canucks	0 – 13	Edmonton Oilers		Moog	17,498	11–2–1	23	
15	November 12	Edmonton Oilers	2 – 5	Washington Capitals		Moog	18,130	11–3–1	23	
16	November 14	Edmonton Oilers	3 – 5	Philadelphia Flyers		Moog	17,211	11–4–1	23	
17	November 16	Edmonton Oilers	4 – 4	New York Islanders	OT	Moog	16,236	11–4–2	24	
18	November 17	Edmonton Oilers	3 – 2	New York Rangers	OT	Moog	17,414	12–4–2	26	
19	November 19	Edmonton Oilers	5 – 4	Quebec Nordiques		Moog	15,357	13–4–2	28	
20	November 20	Edmonton Oilers	5 – 4	Montreal Canadiens	OT	Moog	17,550	14–4–2	30	
21	November 23	New Jersey Devils	2 – 3	Edmonton Oilers		Moog	17,231	15–4–2	32	
22	November 27	Vancouver Canucks	5 – 5	Edmonton Oilers		Moog	17,102	15–4–3	33	
23	November 30	Hartford Whalers	5 – 8	Edmonton Oilers		Fuhr	17,304	16–4–3	35	

December: 10–3–1 (home: 6–2–1; road: 4–1–0)

#	Date	Visitor	Score	Home	OT	Decision	Attendance	Record	Points	Recap
24	December 1	Calgary Flames	3 – 5	Edmonton Oilers		Moog	17,498	17–4–3	37	
25	December 3	Edmonton Oilers	8 – 4	Los Angeles Kings		Fuhr	10,398	18–4–3	39	
26	December 5	Los Angeles Kings	6 – 6	Edmonton Oilers	OT	Moog	17,048	18–4–4	40	
27	December 7	Minnesota North Stars	4 – 8	Edmonton Oilers		Moog	17,179	19–4–4	42	
28	December 8	Chicago Black Hawks	3 – 4	Edmonton Oilers		Moog	17,205	20–4–4	44	
29	December 10	Edmonton Oilers	3 – 7	St. Louis Blues		Fuhr	13,551	20–5–4	44	
30	December 11	Edmonton Oilers	12 – 9	Chicago Black Hawks		Fuhr	17,983	21–5–4	46	
31	December 13	Edmonton Oilers	6 – 3	Winnipeg Jets			15,447	22–5–4	48	
32	December 15	Vancouver Canucks	3 – 5	Edmonton Oilers		Moog	17,039	23–5–4	50	
33	December 18	Washington Capitals	5 – 2	Edmonton Oilers		Fuhr	17,221	23–6–4	50	
34	December 20	Los Angeles Kings	4 – 9	Edmonton Oilers		Moog	17,114	24–6–4	52	
35	December 22	Winnipeg Jets	7 – 5	Edmonton Oilers			17,498	24–7–4	52	
36	December 29	Edmonton Oilers	5 – 3	Vancouver Canucks		Fuhr	16,553	25–7–4	54	
37	December 31	Philadelphia Flyers	3 – 4	Edmonton Oilers		Moog	17,498	26–7–4	56	

January: 10–4–1 (home: 5–2–0; road: 5–2–1)

#	Date	Visitor	Score	Home	OT	Decision	Attendance	Record	Points	Recap
38	January 2	Edmonton Oilers	4 – 3	Calgary Flames		Fuhr	16,761	27–7–4	58	
39	January 4	Hartford Whalers	3 – 4	Edmonton Oilers		Moog	17,282	28–7–4	60	
40	January 5	Calgary Flames	3 – 6	Edmonton Oilers		Fuhr	17,498	29–7–4	62	
41	January 8	Edmonton Oilers	9 – 11	Toronto Maple Leafs		Fuhr	16,282	29–8–4	62	
42	January 10	Edmonton Oilers	3 – 5	Quebec Nordiques		Fuhr	15,358	29–9–4	62	
43	January 11	Edmonton Oilers	6 – 3	Montreal Canadiens		Moog	18,084	30–9–4	64	
44	January 13	Edmonton Oilers	5 – 3	Boston Bruins		Fuhr	13,641	31–9–4	66	
45	January 15	Edmonton Oilers	4 – 1	Hartford Whalers		Moog	15,126	32–9–4	68	
46	January 18	New York Rangers	5 – 4	Edmonton Oilers		Fuhr	17,498	32–10–4	68	
47	January 22	Pittsburgh Penguins	7 – 4	Edmonton Oilers		Moog	17,223	32–11–4	68	
48	January 24	New Jersey Devils	6 – 7	Edmonton Oilers	OT	Fuhr	17,245	33–11–4	70	
49	January 25	Los Angeles Kings	2 – 5	Edmonton Oilers		Moog	17,368	34–11–4	72	
50	January 27	Edmonton Oilers	4 – 3	Chicago Black Hawks		Fuhr	17,568	35–11–4	74	
51	January 29	Edmonton Oilers	5 – 5	St. Louis Blues	OT	Moog	16,116	35–11–5	75	
52	January 31	Calgary Flames	4 – 7	Edmonton Oilers		Fuhr	17,368	36–11–5	77	

February: 7–3–1 (home: 4–1–0; road: 3–2–1)

#	Date	Visitor	Score	Home	OT	Decision	Attendance	Record	Points	Recap
53	February 1	Edmonton Oilers	4 – 4	Calgary Flames	OT	Moog	16,762	36–11–6	78	
54	February 6	Edmonton Oilers	6 – 4	New Jersey Devils		Fuhr	19,040	37–11–6	80	
55	February 8	Edmonton Oilers	4 – 5	Washington Capitals	OT	Moog	18,130	37–12–6	80	
56	February 9	Edmonton Oilers	2 – 4	Buffalo Sabres		Fuhr	16,433	37–13–6	80	
57	February 11	Edmonton Oilers	3 – 2	Detroit Red Wings		Moog	18,913	38–13–6	82	
58	February 14	Quebec Nordiques	2 – 8	Edmonton Oilers		Fuhr	17,498	39–13–6	84	
59	February 16	Buffalo Sabres	5 – 7	Edmonton Oilers		Moog	17,328	40–13–6	86	
60	February 19	Toronto Maple Leafs	5 – 9	Edmonton Oilers		Fuhr	17,498	41–13–6	88	
61	February 22	Boston Bruins	6 – 5	Edmonton Oilers	OT	Moog	17,498	41–14–6	88	
62	February 24	Montreal Canadiens	2 – 3	Edmonton Oilers		Fuhr	17,498	42–14–6	90	
63	February 26	Edmonton Oilers	8 – 2	Winnipeg Jets		Fuhr	14,047	43–14–6	92	

March: 11–2–1 (home: 6–0–0; road: 5–2–1)

#	Date	Visitor	Score	Home	OT	Decision	Attendance	Record	Points	Recap
64	March 2	Philadelphia Flyers	1 – 2	Edmonton Oilers	OT	Fuhr	17,498	44–14–6	94	
65	March 4	Edmonton Oilers	6 – 2	Vancouver Canucks		Moog	14,285	45–14–6	96	
66	March 5	Los Angeles Kings	3 – 6	Edmonton Oilers		Fuhr	17,498	46–14–6	98	
67	March 7	Pittsburgh Penguins	3 – 5	Edmonton Oilers		Moog	17,498	47–14–6	100	
68	March 9	Edmonton Oilers	7 – 3	Los Angeles Kings		Fuhr	16,005	48–14–6	102	
69	March 11	Edmonton Oilers	0 – 4	Minnesota North Stars		Moog	15,953	48–15–6	102	
70	March 12	Edmonton Oilers	8 – 5	Winnipeg Jets		Fuhr	13,335	49–15–6	104	
71	March 14	Detroit Red Wings	3 – 12	Edmonton Oilers		Moog	17,498	50–15–6	106	
72	March 18	Winnipeg Jets	2 – 6	Edmonton Oilers		Fuhr	17,498	51–15–6	108	
73	March 21	Minnesota North Stars	4 – 5	Edmonton Oilers	OT	Moog	17,498	52–15–6	110	
74	March 25	Edmonton Oilers	7 – 2	Detroit Red Wings		Fuhr	18,374	53–15–6	112	
75	March 26	Edmonton Oilers	8 – 3	Pittsburgh Penguins		Moog	16,033	54–15–6	114	
76	March 28	Edmonton Oilers	2 – 4	New York Rangers		Fuhr	17,411	54–16–6	114	
77	March 29	Edmonton Oilers	4 – 4	New York Islanders	OT	Moog	16,265	54–16–7	115	

April: 2–1–0 (home: 1–0–0; road: 1–1–0)

#	Date	Visitor	Score	Home	OT	Decision	Attendance	Record	Points	Recap
78	April 2	Vancouver Canucks	4 – 8	Edmonton Oilers		Fuhr	17,498	55–16–7	117	
79	April 4	Edmonton Oilers	3 – 9	Calgary Flames		Moog	16,762	55–17–7	117	
80	April 6	Edmonton Oilers	3 – 2	Vancouver Canucks		Fuhr	16,218	56–17–7	119	

Legend: Win (2 points) Loss (0 points) Tie (1 point)

== Playoffs ==
In the playoffs, the Oilers made quick work of the Vancouver Canucks in the opening round sweeping them in three straight games, setting up a matchup with their rivals the Calgary Flames, who swept the Winnipeg Jets in their opening round series, for another Battle of Alberta. The Oilers could never seem to get on a roll against the Flames, as the series was pushed to the limit as they would meet for a seventh game in Edmonton. With the score tied up at 2 late in the third period, Oilers defenceman Steve Smith was playing the puck behind the Edmonton goal, and attempted to make a pass, however it hit goalie Grant Fuhr and the puck ended up in the Oilers goal, giving the Flames a 3–2 lead. Edmonton could not come back, as the Flames ended up winning the game, and the series, and ending the Oilers chance at winning a third Stanley Cup in a row.

1986 Stanley Cup playoffs
Smythe Division Semifinals vs. (S4) Vancouver Canucks; Oilers won series 3–0

#	Date	Visitor	Score	Home	OT	Decision	Attendance	Series	Recap
1	April 9	Vancouver Canucks	3 – 7	Edmonton Oilers		Fuhr	17,106	1–0	
2	April 10	Vancouver Canucks	1 – 5	Edmonton Oilers		Moog	17,295	2–0	
3	April 12	Edmonton Oilers	5 – 1	Vancouver Canucks		Fuhr	7,854	3–0	

Smythe Division Finals vs. (S2) Calgary Flames; Flames won series 4–3

#	Date	Visitor	Score	Home	OT	Decision	Attendance	Series	Recap
1	April 18	Calgary Flames	4 – 1	Edmonton Oilers		Fuhr	17,498	0–1	
2	April 20	Calgary Flames	5 – 6	Edmonton Oilers	OT	Fuhr	17,498	1–1	
3	April 22	Edmonton Oilers	2 – 3	Calgary Flames		Fuhr	16,762	1–2	
4	April 24	Edmonton Oilers	7 – 4	Calgary Flames		Fuhr	16,762	2–2	
5	April 26	Calgary Flames	4 – 1	Edmonton Oilers		Fuhr	17,498	2–3	
6	April 28	Edmonton Oilers	5 – 2	Calgary Flames		Fuhr	16,762	3–3	
7	April 30	Calgary Flames	3 – 2	Edmonton Oilers		Fuhr	17,498	3–4	

Legend: Win Loss

== Player statistics ==
=== Regular season ===
Scoring leaders

Player	GP	G	A	Pts	PIM
Wayne Gretzky	80	52	163	215	46
Paul Coffey	79	48	90	138	120
Jari Kurri	78	68	63	131	22
Glenn Anderson	72	54	48	102	90
Mark Messier	63	35	49	84	68

Goaltending

Player	GP	TOI	W	L	T	GA	SO	Save %	GAA
Andy Moog	47	2664	27	9	7	164	1	.889	3.69
Grant Fuhr	40	2184	29	8	0	143	0	.890	3.93

=== Playoffs ===
Scoring leaders

Player	GP	G	A	Pts	PIM
Wayne Gretzky	10	8	11	19	2
Jari Kurri	10	2	10	12	4
Glenn Anderson	10	8	3	11	14
Mark Messier	10	4	6	10	18
Paul Coffey	10	1	9	10	30

Goaltending

Player	GP	TOI	W	L	GA	SO	Save %	GAA
Andy Moog	1	60	1	0	1	0	.963	1.00
Grant Fuhr	9	541	5	4	28	0	.897	3.11

== Awards and records ==
=== Awards ===
- Wayne Gretzky – Art Ross Trophy, Hart Trophy
- Paul Coffey – Norris Trophy

=== Records ===
- 266: An Oilers record for most penalty minutes in a single season by Kevin McClelland.

- 206: A new Oilers record for most penalty minutes in a single season by Kevin McClelland on February 11, 1986.

- 265: An Oilers record for most penalty minutes in a single season by a defenceman by Marty McSorley.

- 197: A new Oilers record for most penalty minutes in a single season by a defenceman by Marty McSorley on March 4, 1986.

- 215: An NHL record for most points in a single season by Wayne Gretzky.

- 213: A new NHL record for most points in a single season by Wayne Gretzky on April 4, 1986.

- 163: An NHL record for most assists in a single season by Wayne Gretzky.

- 136: A new NHL record for most assists in a single season by Wayne Gretzky on March 7, 1986.

- 48: An NHL record for most goals in a single season by a defenceman by Paul Coffey.

- 47: A new NHL record for most goals in a single season by a defenceman by Paul Coffey on April 2, 1986.

- 8: Tied NHL record for most career short-handed goals in a playoffs by Wayne Gretzky on April 24, 1986.

=== Milestones ===
Regular Season
Player	Milestone	Reached
Glenn Anderson	300th NHL PIM	October 10, 1985
Charlie Huddy	200th NHL PIM	October 10, 1985
Esa Tikkanen	1st NHL Game	October 10, 1985
Esa Tikkanen	1st NHL Goal; 1st NHL Assist; 1st NHL Point	October 13, 1985
Mark Napier	500th NHL Game	October 16, 1985
Grant Fuhr	100th NHL Win	October 20, 1985
Wayne Gretzky	700th NHL Assist	October 20, 1985
Paul Coffey	400th NHL Game	October 23, 1985
Lee Fogolin	1,200th NHL PIM	October 25, 1985
Glenn Anderson	12th NHL Hat-trick	October 28, 1985
Kevin McClelland	500th NHL PIM	October 28, 1985
Steve Smith	1st NHL Assist; 1st NHL Point	October 28, 1985
Dave Hunter	600th NHL PIM	November 1, 1985
Kevin McClelland	200th NHL Game	November 1, 1985
Wayne Gretzky	35th NHL Hat-trick	November 3, 1985
Larry Melnyk	1st NHL Goal	November 3, 1985
Mark Messier	200th NHL Goal	November 5, 1985
Dave Lumley	2nd NHL Hat-trick	November 8, 1985
Dave Lumley	400th NHL Game	November 12, 1985
Charlie Huddy	300th NHL Game	November 14, 1985
Dave Semenko	400th NHL Game	November 20, 1985
Steve Smith	1st NHL Goal	November 20, 1985
Craig MacTavish	1st NHL Hat-trick; 1st NHL Natural Hat-trick	December 1, 1985
Jari Kurri	300th NHL Assist	December 5, 1985
Craig MacTavish	100th NHL PIM	December 5, 1985
Wayne Gretzky	500th NHL Game	December 7, 1985
Mike Krushelnyski	100th NHL Goal	December 7, 1985
Jari Kurri	14th NHL Hat-trick	December 7, 1985
Andy Moog	100th NHL Win	December 8, 1985
Glenn Anderson	400th NHL Game; 13th NHL Hat-trick	December 11, 1985
Jari Kurri	15th NHL Hat-trick	December 11, 1985
Paul Coffey	500th NHL Point	December 13, 1985
Wayne Gretzky	1,200th NHL Point	December 13, 1985
Don Jackson	500th NHL PIM	December 13, 1985
Marty McSorley	100th NHL Game	December 15, 1985
Paul Coffey	4th NHL Hat-trick; 3rd NHL Gordie Howe hat trick	December 20, 1985
Jari Kurri	16th NHL Hat-trick; 1st Four-Goal NHL Game	December 20, 1985
Kevin McClelland	600th NHL PIM	December 20, 1985
Dave Semenko	900th NHL PIM	December 20, 1985
Dave Hunter	100th NHL Goal	December 22, 1985
Wayne Gretzky	36th NHL Hat-trick	December 31, 1985
Kevin Lowe	500th NHL Game	December 31, 1985
Marty McSorley	300th NHL PIM; 1st NHL Gordie Howe Hat-trick	January 2, 1986
Randy Gregg	100th NHL Point	January 5, 1986
Wayne Gretzky	37th NHL Hat-trick	January 8, 1986
Glenn Anderson	500th NHL Point	January 10, 1986
Steve Smith	100th NHL PIM	January 10, 1986
Paul Coffey	600th NHL PIM	January 11, 1986
Wayne Gretzky	400th NHL PIM	January 13, 1986
Charlie Huddy	200th NHL Point	January 31, 1986
Dave Hunter	500th NHL Game	January 31, 1986
Paul Coffey	4th NHL Gordie Howe Hat-trick	February 1, 1986
Wayne Gretzky	800th NHL Assist	February 6, 1986
Mark Messier	500th NHL Point	February 11, 1986
Jari Kurri	600th NHL Point	February 14, 1986
Selmar Odelein	1st NHL Game	February 14, 1986
Jari Kurri	400th NHL Game	February 22, 1986
Grant Fuhr	200th NHL Game	February 24, 1986
Marty McSorley	400th NHL PIM	February 24, 1986
Kevin Lowe	500th NHL PIM	February 26, 1986
Mark Messier	8th NHL Hat-trick; 1st NHL Natural Hat-trick	February 26, 1986
Jari Kurri	50th Goal in 65 Games	March 4, 1986
Wayne Gretzky	1,300th NHL Point	March 5, 1986
Glenn Anderson	14th NHL Hat-trick	March 9, 1986
Kevin McClelland	700th NHL PIM	March 9, 1986
Kevin McClelland	100th NHL Point	March 12, 1986
Glenn Anderson	50th Goal in 71 Games; 15th NHL Hat-trick	March 14, 1986
Paul Coffey	400th NHL Assist	March 14, 1986
Risto Jalo	1st NHL Game; 1st NHL Assist; 1st NHL Point	March 14, 1986
Kevin McClelland	3rd NHL Gordie Howe Hat-trick	March 14, 1986
Wayne Gretzky	50th Goal in 72 Games	March 18, 1986
Mark Messier	300th NHL Assist	March 21, 1986
Mark Napier	200th NHL Goal	March 25, 1986
Paul Coffey	600th NHL Point	April 2, 1986
Lee Fogolin	1,300th NHL PIM	April 4, 1986
Marty McSorley	500th NHL PIM	April 4, 1986
Mark Messier	700th NHL PIM	April 4, 1986
Jari Kurri	300th NHL Goal	April 6, 1986

Playoffs
Player	Milestone	Reached
Glenn Anderson	50th NHL Assist	April 9, 1986
Marty McSorley	1st NHL Game; 1st NHL Assist; 1st NHL Point	April 9, 1986
Steve Smith	1st NHL Game	April 9, 1986
Esa Tikkanen	1st NHL Assist; 1st NHL Point	April 9, 1986
Jeff Beukeboom	1st NHL Game	April 10, 1986
Mark Messier	50th NHL Assist	April 10, 1986
Esa Tikkanen	1st NHL Goal	April 12, 1986
Dave Hunter	1st NHL Gordie Howe Hat-trick	April 12, 1986
Kevin Lowe	50th NHL PIM	April 20, 1986
Wayne Gretzky	7th NHL Hat-trick	April 24, 1986
Don Jackson	50th NHL Game	April 24, 1986
Mike Krushelnyski	50th NHL PIM	April 24, 1986
Jari Kurri	50th NHL Goal	April 24, 1986
Marty McSorley	50th NHL PIM	April 24, 1986
Craig MacTavish	1st NHL Gordie Howe Hat-trick	April 24, 1986
Steve Smith	1st NHL Assist; 1st NHL Point	April 28, 1986

== Transactions ==
=== Trades ===
May 31, 1985	To Minnesota North Stars Paul Houck	To Edmonton Oilers Gilles Meloche
September 11, 1985	To Pittsburgh Penguins Gilles Meloche	To Edmonton Oilers Marty McSorley; Tim Hrynewich; Craig Muni
October 4, 1985	To Pittsburgh Penguins Pat Hughes	To Edmonton Oilers Mike Moller
December 20, 1985	To Minnesota North Stars Marc Habscheid; Don Barber; Emanuel Viveiros	To Edmonton Oilers Gord Sherven; Don Biggs
December 20, 1985	To New York Rangers Larry Melnyk; Todd Strueby	To Edmonton Oilers Mike Rogers
December 28, 1985	To Detroit Red Wings Billy Carroll	To Edmonton Oilers Bruce Eakin

=== Players acquired ===
Date	Player	Former team
	Ken Solheim	Minnesota North Stars
	Dean Hopkins	Los Angeles Kings

=== Players lost ===
Date	Player	New team
	Rejean Cloutier	Montreal Canadiens
	Pat Conacher	New Jersey Devils
	Tony Currie	Quebec Nordiques
	Simon Wheeldon	New York Rangers
July 25, 1985	Ken Berry	Released

=== Waivers ===
Date	Player	Team
October 7, 1985	Willy Lindström	to Pittsburgh Penguins
December 5, 1985	Jeff Brubaker	from Toronto Maple Leafs

== Draft picks ==
Edmonton's draft picks at the 1985 NHL entry draft.

Round	#	Player	Nationality	College/junior/club team (league)
1	20	Scott Metcalfe	Canada	Kingston Canadians (OHL)
2	41	Todd Carnelley	Canada	Kamloops Blazers (WHL)
3	62	Mike Ware	Canada	Hamilton Steelhawks (OHL)
5	104	Tomas Kapusta	Czechoslovakia	TJ Gottwaldov (Czechoslovak Extraliga)
6	125	Brian Tessier	Canada	North Bay Centennials (OHL)
7	146	Shawn Tyers	Canada	Kitchener Rangers (OHL)
8	167	Tony Fairfield	Canada	St. Albert Saints (AJHL)
9	188	Kelly Buchberger	Canada	Moose Jaw Warriors (WHL)
10	209	Mario Barbe	Canada	Chicoutimi Saguenéens (QMJHL)
11	230	Peter Headon	Canada	Notre Dame High School (Canada)
12	251	John Haley	United States	Hull High School (USHS)
