= 1985–86 Toronto Maple Leafs season =

NHL hockey team season

1985–86 Toronto Maple Leafs
- Division: 4th Norris
- Conference: 8th Campbell
- 1985–86 record: 25–48–7
- Home record: 16–21–3
- Road record: 9–27–4
- Goals for: 311
- Goals against: 386

Team information
- General manager: Gerry McNamara
- Coach: Dan Maloney
- Captain: Rick Vaive
- Alternate captains: Borje Salming; Brad Maxwell
- Arena: Maple Leaf Gardens

Team leaders
- Goals: Wendel Clark (34)
- Assists: Miroslav Frycer (43)
- Points: Miroslav Frycer (75)
- Penalty minutes: Wendel Clark (227)
- Wins: Don Edwards (12)
- Goals against average: Ken Wregget (4.34)

The 1985–86 Toronto Maple Leafs season was the 69th season of the franchise and its 59th season as the Maple Leafs. Despite posting the third-worst record in the league, the Leafs qualified for the playoff after a two year absence, securing the last playoff spot in a very weak Norris Division. The division champion Chicago Black Hawks, whom they had little trouble against, winning six times out of eight regular season games between them, only recorded 86 points. The Leafs' .356 winning percentage is the fourth-worst in franchise history and one of the worst ever for a playoff qualifier.

Despite this, the Leafs swept the Hawks, who they defeated six times out of eight in the regular season, in three games in the Norris Semi-finals for a total of nine times out of 11 before being eliminated by the St. Louis Blues in a seven-game Norris Final.

== Offseason ==
=== NHL draft ===
Round	#	Player	Nationality	College/Junior/Club team
1	1	Wendel Clark (LW)	Canada	Saskatoon Blades (WHL)
2	22	Ken Spangler (D)	Canada	Calgary Wranglers (WHL)
3	43	Dave Thomlinson (LW)	Canada	Brandon Wheat Kings (WHL)
4	64	Greg Vey (LW)	Canada	Peterborough Petes (OHL)
5	85	Jeff Serowik (D)	United States	Lawrence Academy (USHS-MA)
6	106	Jiri Latal (D)	Czechoslovakia	Dukla Trenčín (Czechoslovakia)
7	127	Tim Bean (LW)	Canada	North Bay Centennials (OHL)
8	148	Andy Donahue (C)	United States	Belmont Hill School (USHS-MA)
9	169	Todd Whittemore (C)	United States	Kent School (USHS-CT)
10	190	Bobby Reynolds (LW)	United States	St. Clair Shores Falcons (NAHL)
11	211	Tim Armstrong (C)	Canada	Toronto Marlboros (OHL)
12	232	Mitch Murphy (G)	Canada	St. Paul's School (USHS-NH)

== Regular season ==
=== Final standings ===
Norris Division
	GP	W	L	T	GF	GA	Pts
**Chicago Black Hawks**	80	39	33	8	351	349	86
**Minnesota North Stars**	80	38	33	9	327	305	85
**St. Louis Blues**	80	37	34	9	302	291	83
**Toronto Maple Leafs**	80	25	48	7	311	386	57
Detroit Red Wings	80	17	57	6	266	415	40

Note: GP = Games played, W = Wins, L = Losses, T = Ties, Pts = Points, GF = Goals for, GA = Goals against
Note: Teams that qualified for the playoffs are highlighted in bold.

=== Record vs. opponents ===
Norris Division record vs. opponents

==== Vs. Campbell Conference ====
**Vs. Norris Division**

1985–86 NHL records
Team	**CHI**	**DET**	**MIN**	**STL**	**TOR**	**Total**
Chicago	—	6−2	3−3−2	5−3	2−6	**16−14−2**
Detroit	2−6	—	1−6−1	2−5−1	3−4−1	**8−21−3**
Minnesota	3−3−2	6−1−1	—	4−3−1	7−0−1	**20−7−5**
St. Louis	3−5	5−2−1	3−4−1	—	3−3−2	**14−14−4**
Toronto	6−2	4−3−1	0−7−1	3−3−2	—	**13−15−4**

**Vs. Smythe Division**

1985–86 NHL records
Team	**CGY**	**EDM**	**LAK**	**VAN**	**WIN**	**Total**
Chicago	2−1	0−3	1−0−2	3−0	2−1	**8−5−2**
Detroit	0−2−1	0−3	2−1	0−3	0−3	**2−12−1**
Minnesota	2−0−1	1−2	1−2	1−2	1−2	**6−8−1**
St. Louis	2−1	1−1−1	1−1−1	3−0	2−1	**9−4−2**
Toronto	1−2	1−2	1−2	0−2−1	1−1−1	**4−9−2**

**Vs. Wales Conference**

**Vs. Adams Division**

1985–86 NHL records
Team	**BOS**	**BUF**	**HFD**	**MTL**	**QUE**	**Total**
Chicago	2−1	2−1	2−1	0−2−1	1−2	**7−7−1**
Detroit	1−2	1−1−1	1−2	0−3	1−2	**4−10−1**
Minnesota	0−3	1−2	2−1	1−1−1	1−2	**5−9−1**
St. Louis	2−1	1−2	1−1−1	2−1	2−1	**8−6−1**
Toronto	0−2−1	2−1	0−3	1−2	0−3	**3−11−1**

**Vs. Patrick Division**

1985–86 NHL records
Team	**NJD**	**NYI**	**NYR**	**PHI**	**PIT**	**WSH**	**Total**
Chicago	1−2	2−0−1	3−0	0−2−1	1−1−1	1−2	**8−7−3**
Detroit	0−2−1	0−3	0−3	1−2	1−2	1−2	**3−14−1**
Minnesota	2−1	2−0−1	2−1	0−2−1	0−3	1−2	**7−9−2**
St. Louis	2−1	1−1−1	1−1−1	1−2	1−2	0−3	**6−10−2**
Toronto	2−1	0−3	1−2	1−2	0−3	1−2	**5−13−0**

== Schedule and results ==
1985–86 regular season
October

Game	Result	Date	Score	Opponent	Record
1	L	October 10, 1985	1–3	@ Boston Bruins (1985–86)	0–1–0
2	L	October 12, 1985	0–4	Quebec Nordiques (1985–86)	0–2–0
3	W	October 13, 1985	5–1	@ Chicago Black Hawks (1985–86)	1–2–0
4	L	October 16, 1985	5–6 OT	Washington Capitals (1985–86)	1–3–0
5	L	October 19, 1985	3–4	Winnipeg Jets (1985–86)	1–4–0
6	L	October 23, 1985	4–5	Pittsburgh Penguins (1985–86)	1–5–0
7	L	October 24, 1985	4–6	@ Pittsburgh Penguins (1985–86)	1–6–0
8	L	October 26, 1985	5–7	Minnesota North Stars (1985–86)	1–7–0
9	L	October 30, 1985	3–5	@ Vancouver Canucks (1985–86)	1–8–0

November

Game	Result	Date	Score	Opponent	Record
10	L	November 2, 1985	2–4	@ Calgary Flames (1985–86)	1–9–0
11	L	November 3, 1985	1–7	@ Edmonton Oilers (1985–86)	1–10–0
12	L	November 6, 1985	4–5	New York Islanders (1985–86)	1–11–0
13	T	November 8, 1985	3–3 OT	@ Detroit Red Wings (1985–86)	1–11–1
14	T	November 9, 1985	2–2 OT	St. Louis Blues (1985–86)	1–11–2
15	L	November 12, 1985	3–4 OT	@ St. Louis Blues (1985–86)	1–12–2
16	T	November 14, 1985	6–6 OT	Boston Bruins (1985–86)	1–12–3
17	W	November 16, 1985	6–4	Chicago Black Hawks (1985–86)	2–12–3
18	W	November 17, 1985	5–3	@ Buffalo Sabres (1985–86)	3–12–3
19	L	November 20, 1985	3–7	@ New York Rangers (1985–86)	3–13–3
20	W	November 23, 1985	9–3	Detroit Red Wings (1985–86)	4–13–3
21	L	November 26, 1985	1–5	@ St. Louis Blues (1985–86)	4–14–3
22	L	November 27, 1985	1–7	@ Pittsburgh Penguins (1985–86)	4–15–3
23	W	November 30, 1985	3–2 OT	Buffalo Sabres (1985–86)	5–15–3

December

Game	Result	Date	Score	Opponent	Record
24	W	December 4, 1985	10–7	New Jersey Devils (1985–86)	6–15–3
25	W	December 5, 1985	6–3	@ Philadelphia Flyers (1985–86)	7–15–3
26	L	December 7, 1985	3–6	Montreal Canadiens (1985–86)	7–16–3
27	L	December 10, 1985	2–3	@ Washington Capitals (1985–86)	7–17–3
28	W	December 11, 1985	6–4	St. Louis Blues (1985–86)	8–17–3
29	T	December 14, 1985	6–6 OT	@ Minnesota North Stars (1985–86)	8–17–4
30	T	December 15, 1985	3–3 OT	@ Winnipeg Jets (1985–86)	8–17–5
31	L	December 18, 1985	3–4	@ Los Angeles Kings (1985–86)	8–18–5
32	L	December 20, 1985	3–5	@ Vancouver Canucks (1985–86)	8–19–5
33	W	December 26, 1985	5–4	@ Detroit Red Wings (1985–86)	9–19–5
34	L	December 28, 1985	3–6	Hartford Whalers (1985–86)	9–20–5

January

Game	Result	Date	Score	Opponent	Record
35	W	January 1, 1986	3–2	Montreal Canadiens (1985–86)	10–20–5
36	L	January 4, 1986	4–6	Los Angeles Kings (1985–86)	10–21–5
37	L	January 5, 1986	5–6	Detroit Red Wings (1985–86)	10–22–5
38	W	January 8, 1986	11–9	Edmonton Oilers (1985–86)	11–22–5
39	L	January 10, 1986	7–9	@ Buffalo Sabres (1985–86)	11–23–5
40	L	January 11, 1986	1–5	Quebec Nordiques (1985–86)	11–24–5
41	W	January 13, 1986	7–4	Detroit Red Wings (1985–86)	12–24–5
42	L	January 15, 1986	1–10	@ St. Louis Blues (1985–86)	12–25–5
43	L	January 18, 1986	2–5	Minnesota North Stars (1985–86)	12–26–5
44	L	January 19, 1986	5–9	Calgary Flames (1985–86)	12–27–5
45	L	January 22, 1986	2–4	New York Rangers (1985–86)	12–28–5
46	L	January 23, 1986	1–4	@ Hartford Whalers (1985–86)	12–29–5
47	L	January 25, 1986	2–3 OT	@ Montreal Canadiens (1985–86)	12–30–5
48	L	January 28, 1986	2–9	@ New York Islanders (1985–86)	12–31–5
49	W	January 29, 1986	5–2	Washington Capitals (1985–86)	13–31–5

February

Game	Result	Date	Score	Opponent	Record
50	L	February 1, 1986	4–7	Chicago Black Hawks (1985–86)	13–32–5
51	W	February 2, 1986	4–3	@ Chicago Black Hawks (1985–86)	14–32–5
52	L	February 6, 1986	7–8 OT	@ Minnesota North Stars (1985–86)	14–33–5
53	W	February 8, 1986	3–2 OT	St. Louis Blues (1985–86)	15–33–5
54	L	February 11, 1986	2–4	Minnesota North Stars (1985–86)	15–34–5
55	L	February 13, 1986	4–5 OT	@ Chicago Black Hawks (1985–86)	15–35–5
56	W	February 15, 1986	4–3	Chicago Black Hawks (1985–86)	16–35–5
57	T	February 16, 1986	4–4 OT	Vancouver Canucks (1985–86)	16–35–6
58	L	February 19, 1986	5–9	@ Edmonton Oilers (1985–86)	16–36–6
59	W	February 20, 1986	7–6 OT	@ Calgary Flames (1985–86)	17–36–6
60	L	February 23, 1986	3–4	@ Minnesota North Stars (1985–86)	17–37–6
61	W	February 25, 1986	7–3	New York Rangers (1985–86)	18–37–6
62	W	February 28, 1986	7–3	@ Detroit Red Wings (1985–86)	19–37–6

March

Game	Result	Date	Score	Opponent	Record
63	L	March 1, 1986	4–6	Detroit Red Wings (1985–86)	19–38–6
64	W	March 3, 1986	6–1	Winnipeg Jets (1985–86)	20–38–6
65	L	March 5, 1986	3–5	@ Minnesota North Stars (1985–86)	20–39–6
66	L	March 6, 1986	4–7	@ Philadelphia Flyers (1985–86)	20–40–6
67	W	March 8, 1986	4–3	Chicago Black Hawks (1985–86)	21–40–6
68	W	March 13, 1986	7–4	@ New Jersey Devils (1985–86)	22–40–6
69	L	March 15, 1986	5–6 OT	Philadelphia Flyers (1985–86)	22–41–6
70	W	March 17, 1986	7–6	Los Angeles Kings (1985–86)	23–41–6
71	L	March 19, 1986	2–5	@ Quebec Nordiques (1985–86)	23–42–6
72	L	March 20, 1986	1–7	New York Islanders (1985–86)	23–43–6
73	L	March 22, 1986	3–6	New Jersey Devils (1985–86)	23–44–6
74	L	March 26, 1986	1–6	Minnesota North Stars (1985–86)	23–45–6
75	W	March 29, 1986	4–1	St. Louis Blues (1985–86)	24–45–6
76	W	March 30, 1986	5–4 OT	@ Chicago Black Hawks (1985–86)	25–45–6

April

Game	Result	Date	Score	Opponent	Record
77	T	April 1, 1986	2–2 OT	@ St. Louis Blues (1985–86)	25–45–7
78	L	April 3, 1986	2–4	@ Boston Bruins (1985–86)	25–46–7
79	L	April 5, 1986	1–7	@ Hartford Whalers (1985–86)	25–47–7
80	L	April 6, 1986	2–4	@ Detroit Red Wings (1985–86)	25–48–7

Legend: Win (2 points) Loss (0 points) Tie (1 point)

== Player statistics ==
=== Regular season ===
Scoring

Player	Pos	GP	G	A	Pts	PIM	+/-	PPG	SHG	GWG
Miroslav Frycer	RW	73	32	43	75	74	-24	7	0	3
Tom Fergus	C	78	31	42	73	64	-24	3	2	3
Rick Vaive	RW	61	33	31	64	85	-19	12	0	1
Russ Courtnall	RW	73	22	38	60	52	0	3	1	4
Steve Thomas	LW	65	20	37	57	36	-15	5	0	5
Marian Stastny	RW	70	23	30	53	21	-6	7	0	0
Wendel Clark	LW/D	66	34	11	45	227	-27	4	0	3
Peter Ihnacak	C	63	18	27	45	16	-9	5	0	1
Walt Poddubny	LW	33	12	22	34	25	6	5	0	1
Al Iafrate	D	65	8	25	33	40	-10	2	0	2
Greg Terrion	LW	76	10	22	32	31	-5	0	2	1
Gary Leeman	RW	53	9	23	32	20	-1	1	1	0
Brad Maxwell	D	52	8	18	26	108	-27	4	0	0
Dan Hodgson	C	40	13	12	25	12	-5	2	0	0
Jim Benning	D	52	4	21	25	71	-4	2	0	0
Borje Salming	D	41	7	15	22	48	-7	3	1	1
Brad Smith	RW	42	5	17	22	84	-8	0	0	0
Dan Daoust	C	80	7	13	20	88	-21	1	0	0
Gary Nylund	D	79	2	16	18	180	-32	0	0	0
Chris Kotsopoulos	D	61	6	11	17	83	-5	0	0	0
Gary McAdam	LW	15	1	6	7	0	-11	0	0	0
Miroslav Ihnacak	LW	21	2	4	6	27	-6	1	0	0
Bob McGill	D	61	1	4	5	141	-17	0	0	0
Todd Gill	D	15	1	2	3	28	0	0	0	0
Jeff Jackson	LW	5	1	2	3	2	3	0	0	0
Wes Jarvis	C	2	1	0	1	2	-1	0	0	0
Tim Bernhardt	G	23	0	1	1	0	0	0	0	0
Rich Costello	C	2	0	1	1	0	0	0	0	0
Craig Muni	D	6	0	1	1	4	-3	0	0	0
Bill Root	D	27	0	1	1	29	-8	0	0	0
Blake Wesley	D	27	0	1	1	21	-4	0	0	0
Allan Bester	G	1	0	0	0	0	0	0	0	0
Jeff Brubaker	LW	21	0	0	0	67	0	0	0	0
Bill Derlago	C	1	0	0	0	0	0	0	0	0
Don Edwards	G	38	0	0	0	4	0	0	0	0
Rod Schutt	LW	6	0	0	0	0	-2	0	0	0
Ken Wregget	G	30	0	0	0	16	0	0	0	0

Goaltending

Player	MIN	GP	W	L	T	GA	GAA	SO	SA	SV	SV%
Don Edwards	2009	38	12	23	0	160	4.78	0	1140	980	.860
Ken Wregget	1566	30	9	13	4	113	4.33	0	901	788	.875
Tim Bernhardt	1266	23	4	12	3	107	5.07	0	727	620	.853
Allan Bester	20	1	0	0	0	2	6.00	0	5	3	.600
Team:	4861	80	25	48	7	382	4.72	0	2773	2391	.862

=== Playoffs ===
Scoring

Player	Pos	GP	G	A	Pts	PIM	PPG	SHG	GWG
Steve Thomas	LW	10	6	8	14	9	3	0	0
Tom Fergus	C	10	5	7	12	6	3	0	1
Gary Leeman	RW	10	2	10	12	2	0	0	0
Russ Courtnall	RW	10	3	6	9	8	1	0	0
Rick Vaive	RW	9	6	2	8	9	3	0	0
Borje Salming	D	10	1	6	7	14	0	0	0
Wendel Clark	LW/D	10	5	1	6	47	1	0	1
Walt Poddubny	LW	9	4	1	5	4	0	0	3
Peter Ihnacak	C	10	2	3	5	12	0	0	1
Dan Daoust	C	10	2	2	4	19	0	0	0
Miroslav Frycer	RW	10	1	3	4	10	0	0	0
Brad Smith	RW	6	2	1	3	20	1	0	0
Al Iafrate	D	10	0	3	3	4	0	0	0
Greg Terrion	LW	10	0	3	3	17	0	0	0
Gary Nylund	D	10	0	2	2	25	0	0	0
Bill Root	D	7	0	2	2	13	0	0	0
Chris Kotsopoulos	D	10	1	0	1	14	0	0	0
Brad Maxwell	D	3	0	1	1	12	0	0	0
Todd Gill	D	1	0	0	0	0	0	0	0
Bob McGill	D	9	0	0	0	35	0	0	0
Marian Stastny	RW	3	0	0	0	0	0	0	0
Ken Wregget	G	10	0	0	0	4	0	0	0

Goaltending

Player	MIN	GP	W	L	GA	GAA	SO	SA	SV	SV%
Ken Wregget	607	10	6	4	32	3.16	1	323	291	.901
Team:	607	10	6	4	32	3.16	1	323	291	.901

Note:

Pos = Position;GP = Games played; G = Goals; A = Assists; Pts = Points; PIM = Penalty minutes; +/- = Plus/minus; PPG = Power-play goals; SHG = Short-handed goals; GWG = Game-winning goals
Pos = Position;GP = Games played; Min, TOI = Minutes played; W = Wins; L = Losses; T,T/OT = Ties; OTL = Overtime losses; GA = Goals-against; GAA = Goals-against average; SO = Shutouts; SA = Shots against; SV = Shots saved;SV% = Save percentage;

== Playoffs ==
=== Norris Division semi-finals ===
Toronto Maple Leafs vs. Chicago Black Hawks

Date	Away	Score	Home	Score	Notes
April 9	Toronto	5	Chicago	3	
April 10	Toronto	6	Chicago	4	
April 12	Chicago	2	Toronto	7	

Toronto wins best-of-five series 3–0

=== Norris Division Finals ===
Toronto Maple Leafs vs. St. Louis Blues

Date	Away	Score	Home	Score	Notes
April 18	Toronto	1	St. Louis	6	
April 20	Toronto	3	St. Louis	0	
April 22	St. Louis	2	Toronto	5	
April 24	St. Louis	7	Toronto	4	
April 26	Toronto	3	St. Louis	4	(OT)
April 28	St. Louis	3	Toronto	5	
April 30	Toronto	1	St. Louis	2	

St. Louis wins best-of-seven series 4–3

== Awards and records ==
- Wendel Clark, NHL All-Rookie Team
- Wendel Clark, Runner-up for the Calder Trophy
- Ken Wregget, Molson Cup (Most game star selections for Toronto Maple Leafs)

== Transactions ==
The Maple Leafs have been involved in the following transactions during the 1985–86 season.

=== Trades ===
August 21, 1985	To Quebec Nordiques John Anderson	To Toronto Maple Leafs Brad Maxwell
September 18, 1985	To Philadelphia Flyers Dom Campedelli	To Toronto Maple Leafs 2nd round pick in 1986 – Darryl Shannon; 4th round pick in 1986 – Ken Hulst
October 7, 1985	To Hartford Whalers Stewart Gavin	To Toronto Maple Leafs Chris Kotsopoulos
October 11, 1985	To Boston Bruins Bill Derlago	To Toronto Maple Leafs Tom Fergus

=== Free agents ===
Player	Former team
Brad Smith	Detroit Red Wings
Blake Wesley	Quebec Nordiques
Gary MacAdam	New Jersey Devils
Marian Stastny	Quebec Nordiques
Rod Schutt	Pittsburgh Penguins
Val James	Buffalo Sabres
Chris McRae	Undrafted Free Agent

Player	New team
Basil McRae	Detroit Red Wings
Lee Norwood	St. Louis Blues
Dave Farrish	Philadelphia Flyers
Jeff Brubaker	Edmonton Oilers

== Farm teams ==
The Maple Leafs were affiliated with the St. Catharines Saints of the AHL.
