= 1985–86 Pittsburgh Penguins season =

NHL team season

1985–86 Pittsburgh Penguins
- Division: 5th Patrick
- Conference: 10th Wales
- 1985–86 record: 34–38–8
- Home record: 20–15–5
- Road record: 14–23–3
- Goals for: 313
- Goals against: 305

Team information
- General manager: Eddie Johnston
- Coach: Bob Berry
- Captain: Mike Bullard
- Alternate captains: Moe Mantha; Terry Ruskowski
- Arena: Pittsburgh Civic Arena

Team leaders
- Goals: Mario Lemieux (48)
- Assists: Mario Lemieux (93)
- Points: Mario Lemieux (141)
- Penalty minutes: Dan Frawley (174)
- Wins: Roberto Romano (21)
- Goals against average: Roberto Romano (3.55)

The 1985–86 Pittsburgh Penguins season was the Penguins' 19th season in the National Hockey League (NHL). The Penguins did not qualify for the playoffs for the fourth year in a row for the first time in franchise history.

== Regular season ==
The Penguins failed to make the playoffs again for the fourth straight year, finishing two points behind the fourth place Rangers for the final spot in the Patrick Division.

=== Final standings ===
Patrick Division
	GP	W	L	T	GF	GA	Pts
**Philadelphia Flyers**	80	53	23	4	335	241	110
**Washington Capitals**	80	50	23	7	315	272	107
**New York Islanders**	80	39	29	12	327	284	90
**New York Rangers**	80	36	38	6	280	276	78
Pittsburgh Penguins	80	34	38	8	313	305	76
New Jersey Devils	80	28	49	3	300	374	59

Note: GP = Games played, W = Wins, L = Losses, T = Ties, Pts = Points, GF = Goals for, GA = Goals against
Note: Teams that qualified for the playoffs are highlighted in bold.

=== Record vs. opponents ===
Patrick Division record vs. opponents

==== Vs. Wales Conference ====
**Vs. Patrick Division**

1985–86 NHL records
Team	**NJD**	**NYI**	**NYR**	**PHI**	**PIT**	**WSH**	**Total**
New Jersey	—	2−5	2−5	3−4	2−4−1	1−6	10−24−1
N.Y. Islanders	5−2	—	3−3−1	4−3	5−1−1	3−4	20−13−2
N.Y. Rangers	5−2	3−3−1	—	1−6	2−4−1	3−3−1	14−18−3
Philadelphia	4−3	3−4	6−1	—	6−0−1	5−2	24−10−1
Pittsburgh	4−2−1	1−5−1	4−2−1	0–6−1	—	1−6	10−21−4
Washington	6−1	4−3	3−3−1	2–5	6−1	—	21−13−1

**Vs. Adams Division**

1985–86 NHL records
Team	**BOS**	**BUF**	**HFD**	**MTL**	**QUE**	**Total**
New Jersey	0−3	1−2	1−2	1−2	2−1	5−10−0
N.Y. Islanders	1−0−2	1−2	2−1	1−2	1−2	6−7−2
N.Y. Rangers	2−1	0−3	1−2	2−0−1	0−2−1	5−8−2
Philadelphia	2−1	1−2	3−0	2−1	1−1−1	9−5−1
Pittsburgh	1−2	2−0−1	1−2	0−2−1	1−1−1	5−7−3
Washington	2−0−1	1−1−1	2−0−1	2−0−1	3−0	10−1−4

==== Vs. Campbell Conference ====
**Vs. Norris Division**

1985–86 NHL records
Team	**CHI**	**DET**	**MIN**	**STL**	**TOR**	**Total**
New Jersey	2−1	2−0−1	1−2	1−2	1−2	7−7−1
N.Y. Islanders	0−2−1	3−0	0−2−1	1−1−1	3−0	7−5−3
N.Y. Rangers	0−3	3−0	1−2	1−1−1	2−1	7−7−1
Philadelphia	2−0−1	2−1	2−0−1	2−1	2−1	10−3−2
Pittsburgh	1−1−1	2−1	3−0	2−1	3−0	11−3−1
Washington	2−1	2−1	2−1	3−0	2−1	11−4−0

**Vs. Smythe Division**

1985–86 NHL records
Team	**CGY**	**EDM**	**LAK**	**VAN**	**WIN**	**Total**
New Jersey	0−2−1	0−3	2−1	2−1	2−1	6−8−1
N.Y. Islanders	1−1−1	0−1−2	2−1	1−1−1	2−0−1	6−4−5
N.Y. Rangers	1−2	2−1	2−1	3−0	2−1	10−5−0
Philadelphia	2−1	1−2	3−0	2−1	2−1	10−5−0
Pittsburgh	1−2	1−2	2−1	2−1	2−1	8−7−0
Washington	0−3	3−0	2−1	2−0−1	1−1−1	8−5−2

== Schedule and results ==
1985–86 regular season
October: 3–5–2 (home: 2–3–1; road: 1–2–1), 8 points

#	Date	Visitor	Score	Home	Location	Record	Points
1	Oct 10	Montreal Canadiens	5–3	Pittsburgh Penguins	Civic Arena	0–1–0	0
2	Oct 12	Philadelphia Flyers	4–2	Pittsburgh Penguins	Civic Arena	0–2–0	0
3	Oct 15	Minnesota North Stars	2–3	Pittsburgh Penguins	Civic Arena	1–2–0	2
4	Oct 16	Pittsburgh Penguins	5–5 OT	Chicago Black Hawks	Chicago Stadium	1–2–1	3
5	Oct 19	Pittsburgh Penguins	3–4	Quebec Nordiques	Quebec Coliseum	1–3–1	3
6	Oct 23	Pittsburgh Penguins	5–4	Toronto Maple Leafs	Maple Leaf Gardens	2–3–1	5
7	Oct 24	Toronto Maple Leafs	4–6	Pittsburgh Penguins	Civic Arena	3–3–1	7
8	Oct 26	Quebec Nordiques	4–4 OT	Pittsburgh Penguins	Civic Arena	3–3–2	8
9	Oct 29	Hartford Whalers	4–3	Pittsburgh Penguins	Civic Arena	3–4–2	8
10	Oct 30	Pittsburgh Penguins	3–6	Detroit Red Wings	Joe Louis Arena	3–5–2	8

November: 5–7–1 (home: 4–3–0; road: 1–4–1), 11 points

#	Date	Visitor	Score	Home	Location	Record	Points
11	Nov 2	Pittsburgh Penguins	4–4 OT	Montreal Canadiens	Montreal Forum	3–5–3	9
12	Nov 4	New York Rangers	4–2	Pittsburgh Penguins	Civic Arena	3–6–3	9
13	Nov 6	Washington Capitals	4–1	Pittsburgh Penguins	Civic Arena	3–7–3	9
14	Nov 8	Pittsburgh Penguins	3–5	New Jersey Devils	Izod Center	3–8–3	9
15	Nov 9	Chicago Black Hawks	1–3	Pittsburgh Penguins	Civic Arena	4–8–3	11
16	Nov 13	Pittsburgh Penguins	6–3	Vancouver Canucks	Pacific Coliseum	5–8–3	13
17	Nov 16	Pittsburgh Penguins	3–4 OT	Los Angeles Kings	The Forum	5–9–3	13
18	Nov 19	Pittsburgh Penguins	3–4	Washington Capitals	Capital Centre	5–10–3	13
19	Nov 20	Washington Capitals	3–1	Pittsburgh Penguins	Civic Arena	5–11–3	13
20	Nov 22	Winnipeg Jets	1–8	Pittsburgh Penguins	Civic Arena	6–11–3	15
21	Nov 24	Pittsburgh Penguins	4–7	Philadelphia Flyers	The Spectrum	6–12–3	15
22	Nov 27	Toronto Maple Leafs	1–7	Pittsburgh Penguins	Civic Arena	7–12–3	17
23	Nov 30	New York Rangers	4–5	Pittsburgh Penguins	Civic Arena	8–12–3	19

December: 8–6–1 (home: 3–3–1; road: 5–3–0), 17 points

#	Date	Visitor	Score	Home	Location	Record	Points
24	Dec 2	Pittsburgh Penguins	6–0	New York Rangers	Madison Square Garden (IV)	9–12–3	21
25	Dec 4	Detroit Red Wings	2–5	Pittsburgh Penguins	Civic Arena	10–12–3	23
26	Dec 6	Pittsburgh Penguins	3–1	Buffalo Sabres	Buffalo Memorial Auditorium	11–12–3	25
27	Dec 7	New Jersey Devils	5–1	Pittsburgh Penguins	Civic Arena	11–13–3	25
28	Dec 10	Pittsburgh Penguins	4–7	New York Islanders	Nassau Veterans Memorial Coliseum	11–14–3	25
29	Dec 11	New York Islanders	4–4 OT	Pittsburgh Penguins	Civic Arena	11–14–4	26
30	Dec 14	Pittsburgh Penguins	4–5	Hartford Whalers	XL Center	11–15–4	26
31	Dec 15	Pittsburgh Penguins	5–2	New York Rangers	Madison Square Garden (IV)	12–15–4	28
32	Dec 17	Calgary Flames	3–4	Pittsburgh Penguins	Civic Arena	13–15–4	30
33	Dec 19	Pittsburgh Penguins	4–3 OT	Minnesota North Stars	Met Center	14–15–4	32
34	Dec 21	Philadelphia Flyers	4–2	Pittsburgh Penguins	Civic Arena	14–16–4	32
35	Dec 22	Pittsburgh Penguins	2–3 OT	Philadelphia Flyers	The Spectrum	14–17–4	32
36	Dec 26	Boston Bruins	3–4	Pittsburgh Penguins	Civic Arena	15–17–4	34
37	Dec 28	New York Islanders	4–2	Pittsburgh Penguins	Civic Arena	15–18–4	34
38	Dec 31	Pittsburgh Penguins	8–4	St. Louis Blues	The Checkerdome	16–18–4	36

January: 7–4–2 (home: 4–0–2; road: 3–4–0), 16 points

#	Date	Visitor	Score	Home	Location	Record	Points
39	Jan 1	Pittsburgh Penguins	4–7	Chicago Black Hawks	Chicago Stadium	16–19–4	36
40	Jan 6	New Jersey Devils	3–4	Pittsburgh Penguins	Civic Arena	17–19–4	38
41	Jan 8	Los Angeles Kings	3–7	Pittsburgh Penguins	Civic Arena	18–19–4	40
42	Jan 9	Pittsburgh Penguins	0–9	New York Islanders	Nassau Veterans Memorial Coliseum	18–20–4	40
43	Jan 11	Buffalo Sabres	3–3 OT	Pittsburgh Penguins	Civic Arena	18–20–5	41
44	Jan 15	New York Islanders	3–6	Pittsburgh Penguins	Civic Arena	19–20–5	43
45	Jan 18	Pittsburgh Penguins	5–2	St. Louis Blues	The Checkerdome	20–20–5	45
46	Jan 19	Minnesota North Stars	2–3	Pittsburgh Penguins	Civic Arena	21–20–5	47
47	Jan 22	Pittsburgh Penguins	7–4	Edmonton Oilers	Northlands Coliseum	22–20–5	49
48	Jan 24	Pittsburgh Penguins	3–4	Vancouver Canucks	Pacific Coliseum	22–21–5	49
49	Jan 25	Pittsburgh Penguins	2–5	Calgary Flames	Scotiabank Saddledome	22–22–5	49
50	Jan 28	Philadelphia Flyers	2–2 OT	Pittsburgh Penguins	Civic Arena	22–22–6	50
51	Jan 29	Pittsburgh Penguins	4–1	New Jersey Devils	Izod Center	23–22–6	52

February: 7–4–1 (home: 6–1–0; road: 1–3–1), 15 points

#	Date	Visitor	Score	Home	Location	Record	Points
52	Feb 1	Pittsburgh Penguins	3–4	New York Islanders	Nassau Veterans Memorial Coliseum	23–23–6	52
53	Feb 2	Pittsburgh Penguins	2–3	Boston Bruins	Boston Garden	23–24–6	52
54	Feb 8	New Jersey Devils	0–4	Pittsburgh Penguins	Civic Arena	24–24–6	54
55	Feb 12	Washington Capitals	1–8	Pittsburgh Penguins	Civic Arena	25–24–6	56
56	Feb 15	Vancouver Canucks	4–9	Pittsburgh Penguins	Civic Arena	26–24–6	58
57	Feb 16	Pittsburgh Penguins	5–5 OT	New Jersey Devils	Izod Center	26–24–7	59
58	Feb 19	Winnipeg Jets	2–5	Pittsburgh Penguins	Civic Arena	27–24–7	61
59	Feb 21	Pittsburgh Penguins	7–3	Detroit Red Wings	Joe Louis Arena	28–24–7	63
60	Feb 22	St. Louis Blues	5–3	Pittsburgh Penguins	Civic Arena	28–25–7	63
61	Feb 24	Los Angeles Kings	5–6 OT	Pittsburgh Penguins	Civic Arena	29–25–7	65
62	Feb 26	Buffalo Sabres	2–5	Pittsburgh Penguins	Civic Arena	30–25–7	67
63	Feb 27	Pittsburgh Penguins	3–8	New York Rangers	Madison Square Garden (IV)	30–26–7	67

March: 3–9–1 (home: 1–3–1; road: 2–6–0), 7 points

#	Date	Visitor	Score	Home	Location	Record	Points
64	Mar 1	Hartford Whalers	1–5	Pittsburgh Penguins	Civic Arena	31–26–7	69
65	Mar 4	Pittsburgh Penguins	3–6	Calgary Flames	Scotiabank Saddledome	31–27–7	69
66	Mar 7	Pittsburgh Penguins	3–5	Edmonton Oilers	Northlands Coliseum	31–28–7	69
67	Mar 9	Pittsburgh Penguins	3–5	Winnipeg Jets	Winnipeg Arena	31–29–7	69
68	Mar 11	Pittsburgh Penguins	3–5	Washington Capitals	Capital Centre	31–30–7	69
69	Mar 12	Boston Bruins	5–2	Pittsburgh Penguins	Civic Arena	31–31–7	69
70	Mar 15	New York Rangers	2–2 OT	Pittsburgh Penguins	Civic Arena	31–31–8	70
71	Mar 17	Washington Capitals	5–3	Pittsburgh Penguins	Civic Arena	31–32–8	70
72	Mar 19	Pittsburgh Penguins	7–3	New Jersey Devils	Izod Center	32–32–8	72
73	Mar 20	Pittsburgh Penguins	1–5	Philadelphia Flyers	The Spectrum	32–33–8	72
74	Mar 22	Pittsburgh Penguins	7–4	Quebec Nordiques	Quebec Coliseum	33–33–8	74
75	Mar 26	Edmonton Oilers	8–3	Pittsburgh Penguins	Civic Arena	33–34–8	74
76	Mar 29	Pittsburgh Penguins	3–4	Montreal Canadiens	Montreal Forum	33–35–8	74

April: 1–3–0 (home: 0–2–0; road: 1–1–0), 2 points

#	Date	Visitor	Score	Home	Location	Record	Points
77	Apr 1	Pittsburgh Penguins	3–5	Washington Capitals	Capital Centre	33–36–8	74
78	Apr 2	New York Islanders	7–2	Pittsburgh Penguins	Civic Arena	33–37–8	74
79	Apr 5	Philadelphia Flyers	4–3 OT	Pittsburgh Penguins	Civic Arena	33–38–8	74
80	Apr 6	Pittsburgh Penguins	5–4 OT	New York Rangers	Madison Square Garden (IV)	34–38–8	76

Legend: Win (2 points) Loss (0 points) Tie (1 point)

== Player statistics ==
Skaters

Regular season
Player	GP	G	A	Pts	+/−	PIM
Mario Lemieux	79	48	93	141	–6	43
Mike Bullard	77	41	42	83	–16	69
Moe Mantha Jr.	78	15	52	67	–4	102
Doug Shedden^{‡}	67	32	34	66	–7	32
Terry Ruskowski	73	26	37	63	10	162
Randy Cunneyworth	75	15	30	45	12	74
John Chabot	77	14	31	45	–1	6
Doug Bodger	79	4	33	37	3	63
Dave Hannan	75	17	18	35	–4	91
Willy Lindström	71	14	17	31	0	30
Norm Schmidt	66	15	14	29	7	57
Mike Blaisdell	66	15	14	29	15	36
Jim Johnson	80	3	26	29	12	115
Craig Simpson	76	11	17	28	1	49
Dan Frawley	69	10	11	21	–19	174
Bob Errey	37	11	6	17	1	8
Ron Duguay^{†}	13	6	7	13	–14	6
Troy Loney	47	3	9	12	–8	95
Ville Sirén	60	4	8	12	–8	32
Rod Buskas	72	2	7	9	–9	159
Jim McGeough	17	3	2	5	–4	8
Tom O'Regan	9	1	2	3	1	2
Chris Dahlquist	5	1	2	3	1	2
Randy Hillier	28	0	3	3	–3	53
Ted Nolan	18	1	1	2	–1	34
Dwight Mathiasen	4	1	0	1	–4	2
Todd Charlesworth	2	0	1	1	–1	0
Joe McDonnell	3	0	0	0	–3	2
Tom Roulston	5	0	0	0	–2	2
Wayne Babych^{‡}	2	0	0	0	–1	0
Mike Rowe	3	0	0	0	–1	4
Phil Bourque	4	0	0	0	–2	2
Total		313	517	830	—	1,514

Goaltenders

Regular Season
Player	GP	TOI	W	L	T	GA	GAA	SA	SV%	SO
Roberto Romano	46	2684:00	21	20	3	159	3.55	1394	0.886	2
Gilles Meloche	34	1989:00	13	15	5	119	3.59	1003	0.881	0
Denis Herron	3	180:00	0	3	0	14	4.67	92	0.848	0
Total		4853:00	34	38	8	292	3.61	2489	0.883	2

^{†}Denotes player spent time with another team before joining the Penguins. Stats reflect time with the Penguins only.
^{‡}Denotes player was traded mid-season. Stats reflect time with the Penguins only.

== Awards and records ==
- Mario Lemieux became the first person to score 70 assists in a season for the Penguins. He did so in a 7–3 win over Detroit on February 21.
- Mario Lemieux became the first person to score 80 assists and also 120 points in a season for the Penguins. He did so with the same assist in a 5–1 win over Hartford on March 1.
- Mario Lemieux became the first person to score 130 points in a season for the Penguins. He did so in a 7–3 win over New Jersey on March 19.
- Mario Lemieux became the first person to score 90 assists in a season for the Penguins. He did so in a 3–8 loss to with Edmonton on March 26.
- Mario Lemieux became the first person to score 140 points in a season for the Penguins. He did so in a 5–4 win over New York on April 6.
- Mario Lemieux established a new franchise record for assists (94) and points (141) in a season. He topped the previous highs of 111 points (Pierre Larouche, 1976) and 67 assists (Syl Apps Jr. 1976 and Randy Carlyle 1981).

== Transactions ==
The Penguins were involved in the following transactions during the 1985–86 season:

=== Trades ===
September 10, 1985	To Edmonton Oilers Tim Hrynewich; Marty McSorley future considerations (Craig Muni)	To Pittsburgh Penguins Gilles Meloche
September 10, 1985	To New York Islanders future considerations	To Pittsburgh Penguins Dave Simpson
September 16, 1985	To Buffalo Sabres cash	To Pittsburgh Penguins Ted Nolan
October 4, 1985	To Edmonton Oilers Pat Price	To Pittsburgh Penguins Pat Hughes
October 4, 1985	To Buffalo Sabres Pat Hughes	To Pittsburgh Penguins Randy Cunneyworth; Mike Moller
October 20, 1985	To Quebec Nordiques Wayne Babych	To Pittsburgh Penguins future considerations
March 11, 1986	To Detroit Red Wings Doug Shedden	To Pittsburgh Penguins Ron Duguay

=== Additions and subtractions ===
Additions
Player	Former team	Via
Chris Dahlquist	Lake Superior State Lakers (CCHA)	free agency (1985-05-07)
Jim Johnson	University of Minnesota-Duluth Bulldogs (WCHA)	free agency (1985-06-09)
Terry Ruskowski	Los Angeles Kings	free agency (1985-10-03)
Willy Lindstrom	Edmonton Oilers	Waiver Draft (1985-10-07)
Dan Frawley	Chicago Black Hawks	Waiver Draft (1985-10-07)
Mike Blaisdell	New York Rangers	Waiver Draft (1985-10-07)
Dwight Mathiasen	University of Denver Pioneers (WCHA)	free agency (1986-03-31)
Steve Guenette	Guelph Platers (OHL)	free agency (1986-04-06)

Subtractions
Player	New team	Via
Warren Young	Detroit Red Wings	free agency (1985-07-10)
Tim Tookey	Philadelphia Flyers	free agency (1985-07-11)
Kevin McCarthy	Philadelphia Flyers	free agency (1985-07-19)
Arto Javanainen	Assat Pori (SM-liiga)	free agency
Petteri Lehto	TPS Turku (SM-liiga)	free agency
Rod Schutt	Toronto Maple Leafs	free agency (1985-10-03)
Tony Feltrin	New York Rangers	free agency (1985-10-08)

== Draft picks ==
The 1985 NHL entry draft was held on June 15, 1985, in Toronto, Ontario.

Round	#	Player	Pos	Nationality	College/Junior/Club team (League)
1	2	Craig Simpson	Left wing	Canada	Michigan State University (NCAA)
2	23	Lee Giffin	Right wing	Canada	Oshawa Generals (OHL)
3	58	Bruce Racine	Goaltender	Canada	Northeastern University (NCAA)
5	86	Steve Gotaas	Center	Canada	Prince Albert Raiders (WHL)
6	107	Kevin Clemens	Left wing	Canada	Regina Pats (WHL)
6	114	Stewart Marston	Defense	Canada	Longueuil Chevaliers (QMJHL)
7	128	Steve Titus	Goaltender	Canada	Cornwall Royals (OHL)
8	149	Paul Stanton	Defense	United States	Catholic Memorial H.S. (Massachusetts)
9	170	Jim Paek	Defense	South Korea	Oshawa Generals (OHL)
10	191	Steve Shaunessy	Defense	United States	Reading H.S. (Massachusetts)
11	212	Doug Greschuk	Defense	Canada	St. Albert Saints (AJHL)
12	233	Gregory Choules	Left wing	Canada	Chicoutimi Saguenéens (QMJHL)

== See also ==
- 1985–86 NHL season
