= 1985–86 Philadelphia Flyers season =

NHL hockey team season

1985–86 Philadelphia Flyers
- Patrick Division champions
- Division: 1st Patrick
- Conference: 1st Wales
- 1985–86 record: 53–23–4
- Home record: 33–6–1
- Road record: 20–17–3
- Goals for: 335 (4th)
- Goals against: 241 (1st)

Team information
- General manager: Bob Clarke
- Coach: Mike Keenan
- Captain: Dave Poulin
- Alternate captains: Mark Howe; Brad Marsh
- Arena: Spectrum
- Average attendance: 17,184
- Minor league affiliates: Hershey Bears; Kalamazoo Wings

Team leaders
- Goals: Tim Kerr (58)
- Assists: Mark Howe (58)
- Points: Brian Propp (97)
- Penalty minutes: Rick Tocchet (284)
- Plus/minus: Mark Howe (+85)
- Wins: Bob Froese (31)
- Goals against average: Bob Froese (2.55)

The 1985–86 Philadelphia Flyers season was the franchise's 19th season in the National Hockey League (NHL). The Flyers lost in the first round of the playoffs in five game to the New York Rangers.

== Regular season ==
The club began the year 12–2–0 (with both losses coming at home to New Jersey and Quebec), which included 10 consecutive wins until goaltender Pelle Lindbergh was killed in a car accident in the early hours of November 10.

Due to the tragedy, back-up Bob Froese became the de facto starter, and the club called up Darren Jensen for relief work. Froese suffered a groin injury in practice prior to the team's next game against the Edmonton Oilers, so Jensen got the start against the defending Stanley Cup champions at the Spectrum on November 14.

Following an emotional memorial service, the Flyers posted a spirited 5–3 win, featuring four goals in the third period to earn their 11th victory in a row. They went on to beat Hartford two days later to set a new franchise record for consecutive wins, then rallied from three-goals down to top the New York Islanders 5–4 in overtime the next day. The Islanders ended the streak two nights later in Uniondale, almost wasting a four-goal lead in an 8–6 decision.

Philly became the first club in the NHL to reach 30 wins, after a 4–0 shutout of the Washington Capitals on January 9, but began to falter in February and early March, losing four straight games and seeing the Capitals climb within striking distance. The Caps and Flyers each spent time in first place for the remainder of the schedule, but the orange and black took the division crown on the last day of the season (April 6) with a come-from-behind 5–3 home win after being down 2–0.

In a 7–3 loss to the Devils on March 8, Tim Kerr set an NHL record with his 29th power-play goal of the season, passing Hall-of-Famer Phil Esposito's mark. He finished the year with 34, the league record to this day.

Propp had the best chance of his career to crack the 100-point mark, but that was derailed on March 6, when Buffalo Sabres forward Lindy Ruff caught him in the eye with a high stick. The incident cost Propp several games, and he finished with a team-high 97 points while also causing him to wear a visor for the remainder of his career.

Bob Clarke made a couple minor deals during the season, trading Ed Hospodar and the enigmatic Todd Bergen to the Minnesota North Stars for Dave Richter and Bo Berglund on November 29. Neither player lasted beyond the season with the Flyers, while Hospodar returned in 1986–87. Also, Joe Paterson and Len Hachborn were sent in separate deals to the Los Angeles Kings, and Chico Resch was acquired from the Devils for a draft pick in early March.

Froese finished second in voting for the Vezina Trophy. Mark Howe finished second in voting for the Norris Trophy and third in voting for the Hart Memorial Trophy as league MVP. Howe was named to the first NHL All-Star team and took home the NHL Plus-Minus Award – the defense pairing of Howe and Brad McCrimmon finished with a +85 and a +83 respectively – while Froese was named to the second NHL All-Star team and was the co-winner with Jensen of the William M. Jennings Trophy.

=== Season standings ===
Patrick Division
	GP	W	L	T	GF	GA	Pts
**Philadelphia Flyers**	80	53	23	4	335	241	110
**Washington Capitals**	80	50	23	7	315	272	107
**New York Islanders**	80	39	29	12	327	284	90
**New York Rangers**	80	36	38	6	280	276	78
Pittsburgh Penguins	80	34	38	8	313	305	76
New Jersey Devils	80	28	49	3	300	374	59

Note: GP = Games played, W = Wins, L = Losses, T = Ties, Pts = Points, GF = Goals for, GA = Goals against
Note: Teams that qualified for the playoffs are highlighted in bold.

=== Record vs. opponents ===
Patrick Division record vs. opponents

==== Vs. Wales Conference ====
**Vs. Patrick Division**

1985–86 NHL records
Team	**NJD**	**NYI**	**NYR**	**PHI**	**PIT**	**WSH**	**Total**
New Jersey	—	2−5	2−5	3−4	2−4−1	1−6	10−24−1
N.Y. Islanders	5−2	—	3−3−1	4−3	5−1−1	3−4	20−13−2
N.Y. Rangers	5−2	3−3−1	—	1−6	2−4−1	3−3−1	14−18−3
Philadelphia	4−3	3−4	6−1	—	6−0−1	5−2	24−10−1
Pittsburgh	4−2−1	1−5−1	4−2−1	0–6−1	—	1−6	10−21−4
Washington	6−1	4−3	3−3−1	2–5	6−1	—	21−13−1

**Vs. Adams Division**

1985–86 NHL records
Team	**BOS**	**BUF**	**HFD**	**MTL**	**QUE**	**Total**
New Jersey	0−3	1−2	1−2	1−2	2−1	5−10−0
N.Y. Islanders	1−0−2	1−2	2−1	1−2	1−2	6−7−2
N.Y. Rangers	2−1	0−3	1−2	2−0−1	0−2−1	5−8−2
Philadelphia	2−1	1−2	3−0	2−1	1−1−1	9−5−1
Pittsburgh	1−2	2−0−1	1−2	0−2−1	1−1−1	5−7−3
Washington	2−0−1	1−1−1	2−0−1	2−0−1	3−0	10−1−4

==== Vs. Campbell Conference ====
**Vs. Norris Division**

1985–86 NHL records
Team	**CHI**	**DET**	**MIN**	**STL**	**TOR**	**Total**
New Jersey	2−1	2−0−1	1−2	1−2	1−2	7−7−1
N.Y. Islanders	0−2−1	3−0	0−2−1	1−1−1	3−0	7−5−3
N.Y. Rangers	0−3	3−0	1−2	1−1−1	2−1	7−7−1
Philadelphia	2−0−1	2−1	2−0−1	2−1	2−1	10−3−2
Pittsburgh	1−1−1	2−1	3−0	2−1	3−0	11−3−1
Washington	2−1	2−1	2−1	3−0	2−1	11−4−0

**Vs. Smythe Division**

1985–86 NHL records
Team	**CGY**	**EDM**	**LAK**	**VAN**	**WIN**	**Total**
New Jersey	0−2−1	0−3	2−1	2−1	2−1	6−8−1
N.Y. Islanders	1−1−1	0−1−2	2−1	1−1−1	2−0−1	6−4−5
N.Y. Rangers	1−2	2−1	2−1	3−0	2−1	10−5−0
Philadelphia	2−1	1−2	3−0	2−1	2−1	10−5−0
Pittsburgh	1−2	1−2	2−1	2−1	2−1	8−7−0
Washington	0−3	3−0	2−1	2−0−1	1−1−1	8−5−2

== Playoffs ==
Despite their regular season success, an emotionally exhausted Flyers team lost in the first round of the playoffs to the New York Rangers in five games.

== Schedule and results ==
=== Regular season ===
1985–86 regular season
October: 7–2–0, 14 points (home: 3–2–0; road: 4–0–0)

Game	Date	Score	Opponent	Decision	Record	Points	Recap
1	October 10	5–6	New Jersey Devils	Lindbergh	0–1–0	0	L
2	October 12	4–2	@ Pittsburgh Penguins	Froese	1–1–0	2	W
3	October 13	4–2	@ Washington Capitals	Lindbergh	2–1–0	4	W
4	October 17	1–2	Quebec Nordiques	Lindbergh	2–2–0	4	L
5	October 19	7–3	Minnesota North Stars	Froese	3–2–0	6	W
6	October 20	5–2	@ Chicago Black Hawks	Froese	4–2–0	8	W
7	October 24	3–0	Hartford Whalers	Lindbergh	5–2–0	10	W
8	October 27	7–4	Vancouver Canucks	Froese	6–2–0	12	W
9	October 30	5–4	@ Montreal Canadiens	Lindbergh	7–2–0	14	W

November: 12–2–0, 24 points (home: 8–0–0; road: 4–2–0)

Game	Date	Score	Opponent	Decision	Record	Points	Recap
10	November 2	5–3	@ Quebec Nordiques	Lindbergh	8–2–0	16	W
11	November 3	7–4	Los Angeles Kings	Lindbergh	9–2–0	18	W
12	November 6	5–2	@ New York Rangers	Froese	10–2–0	20	W
13	November 7	6–2	Chicago Black Hawks	Lindbergh	11–2–0	22	W
14	November 9	5–3	Boston Bruins	Froese	12–2–0	24	W
15	November 14	5–3	Edmonton Oilers	Jensen	13–2–0	26	W
16	November 16	5–2	@ Hartford Whalers	Jensen	14–2–0	28	W
17	November 17	5–4 OT	New York Islanders	Jensen	15–2–0	30	W
18	November 19	6–8	@ New York Islanders	Jensen	15–3–0	30	L
19	November 21	3–0	Hartford Whalers	Froese	16–3–0	32	W
20	November 23	4–5	@ Boston Bruins	Froese	16–4–0	32	L
21	November 24	7–4	Pittsburgh Penguins	Jensen	17–4–0	34	W
22	November 27	6–1	Winnipeg Jets	Froese	18–4–0	36	W
23	November 29	4–1	@ Minnesota North Stars	Froese	19–4–0	38	W

December: 9–6–0, 18 points (home: 5–1–0; road: 4–5–0)

Game	Date	Score	Opponent	Decision	Record	Points	Recap
24	December 1	1–2	@ Winnipeg Jets	Froese	19–5–0	38	L
25	December 3	1–4	@ Detroit Red Wings	Froese	19–6–0	38	L
26	December 5	3–6	Toronto Maple Leafs	Jensen	19–7–0	38	L
27	December 7	4–0	New York Rangers	Froese	20–7–0	40	W
28	December 8	1–3	@ New York Rangers	Froese	20–8–0	40	L
29	December 10	7–4	Boston Bruins	Jensen	21–8–0	42	W
30	December 12	6–3	Montreal Canadiens	Jensen	22–8–0	44	W
31	December 14	6–4	@ Detroit Red Wings	Jensen	23–8–0	46	W
32	December 17	4–7	@ New Jersey Devils	Froese	23–9–0	46	L
33	December 19	6–3	New Jersey Devils	Jensen	24–9–0	48	W
34	December 21	4–2	@ Pittsburgh Penguins	Froese	25–9–0	50	W
35	December 22	3–2 OT	Pittsburgh Penguins	Froese	26–9–0	52	W
36	December 27	6–1	@ Vancouver Canucks	Froese	27–9–0	54	W
37	December 28	6–5	@ Calgary Flames	Froese	28–9–0	56	W
38	December 31	3–4	@ Edmonton Oilers	Froese	28–10–0	56	L

January: 7–5–1, 15 points (home: 4–1–0; road: 3–4–1)

Game	Date	Score	Opponent	Decision	Record	Points	Recap
39	January 2	7–4	@ Los Angeles Kings	Jensen	29–10–0	58	W
40	January 4	1–2	@ St. Louis Blues	Froese	29–11–0	58	L
41	January 9	4–0	Washington Capitals	Jensen	30–11–0	60	W
42	January 11	8–4	@ New Jersey Devils	Jensen	31–11–0	62	W
43	January 12	3–0	Calgary Flames	Froese	32–11–0	64	W
44	January 14	3–2	New Jersey Devils	Froese	33–11–0	66	W
45	January 17	3–4	New York Islanders	Froese	33–12–0	66	L
46	January 18	2–5	@ Washington Capitals	Jensen	33–13–0	66	L
47	January 21	3–7	@ New York Islanders	Froese	33–14–0	66	L
48	January 23	5–2	Detroit Red Wings	Jensen	34–14–0	68	W
49	January 25	1–0	@ St. Louis Blues	Jensen	35–14–0	70	W
50	January 28	2–2 OT	@ Pittsburgh Penguins	Jensen	35–14–1	71	T
51	January 30	4–8	@ New York Islanders	Jensen	35–15–1	71	L

February: 6–3–3, 15 points (home: 5–0–1; road: 1–3–2)

Game	Date	Score	Opponent	Decision	Record	Points	Recap
52	February 1	2–2 OT	@ Quebec Nordiques	Froese	35–15–2	72	T
53	February 6	4–3	St. Louis Blues	Froese	36–15–2	74	W
54	February 8	3–3 OT	Minnesota North Stars	Froese	36–15–3	75	T
55	February 9	2–2 OT	@ Chicago Black Hawks	Froese	36–15–4	76	T
56	February 12	4–0	@ Buffalo Sabres	Froese	37–15–4	78	W
57	February 13	6–3	New York Islanders	Froese	38–15–4	80	W
58	February 15	3–5	@ Montreal Canadiens	Froese	38–16–4	80	L
59	February 17	8–4	Winnipeg Jets	Froese	39–16–4	82	W
60	February 20	5–3	Los Angeles Kings	Jensen	40–16–4	84	W
61	February 22	3–1	Washington Capitals	Froese	41–16–4	86	W
62	February 27	4–7	@ Calgary Flames	Jensen	41–17–4	86	L
63	February 28	1–3	@ Vancouver Canucks	Jensen	41–18–4	86	L

March: 8–5–0, 16 points (home: 6–2–0; road: 2–3–0)

Game	Date	Score	Opponent	Decision	Record	Points	Recap
64	March 2	1–2 OT	@ Edmonton Oilers	Jensen	41–19–4	86	L
65	March 4	4–6	Buffalo Sabres	Jensen	41–20–4	86	L
66	March 6	7–4	Toronto Maple Leafs	Jensen	42–20–4	88	W
67	March 8	3–7	@ New Jersey Devils	Jensen	42–21–4	88	L
68	March 9	4–1	@ New York Rangers	Froese	43–21–4	90	W
69	March 13	2–0	Washington Capitals	Froese	44–21–4	92	W
70	March 15	6–5 OT	@ Toronto Maple Leafs	Froese	45–21–4	94	W
71	March 16	4–1	New Jersey Devils	Froese	46–21–4	96	W
72	March 20	5–1	Pittsburgh Penguins	Froese	47–21–4	98	W
73	March 22	4–2	New York Rangers	Resch	48–21–4	100	W
74	March 23	5–6	@ Washington Capitals	Resch	48–22–4	100	L
75	March 27	0–1	Buffalo Sabres	Resch	48–23–4	100	L
76	March 29	8–2	New York Rangers	Froese	49–23–4	102	W

April: 4–0–0, 8 points (home: 2–0–0; road: 2–0–0)

Game	Date	Score	Opponent	Decision	Record	Points	Recap
77	April 1	4–2	New York Islanders	Froese	50–23–4	104	W
78	April 2	3–2	@ New York Rangers	Froese	51–23–4	106	W
79	April 5	4–3 OT	@ Pittsburgh Penguins	Froese	52–23–4	108	W
80	April 6	5–3	Washington Capitals	Froese	53–23–4	110	W

Legend: W Win (2 points) L Loss (0 points) T Tie (1 point)

=== Playoffs ===
1986 Stanley Cup playoffs
Patrick Division semifinals vs. New York Rangers – Rangers win 3–2

Game	Date	Score	Opponent	Decision	Series	Recap
1	April 9	2–6	New York Rangers	Froese	Rangers lead 1–0	L
2	April 10	2–1	New York Rangers	Froese	Series tied 1–1	W
3	April 12	2–5	@ New York Rangers	Froese	Rangers lead 2–1	L
4	April 13	7–1	@ New York Rangers	Froese	Series tied 2–2	W
5	April 15	2–5	New York Rangers	Froese	Rangers win 3–2	L

Legend: W Win L Loss

== Player statistics ==
=== Scoring ===
- Position abbreviations: C = Center; D = Defense; G = Goaltender; LW = Left wing; RW = Right wing
- † = Joined team via a transaction (e.g., trade, waivers, signing) during the season. Stats reflect time with the Flyers only.
- ‡ = Left team via a transaction (e.g., trade, waivers, release) during the season. Stats reflect time with the Flyers only.

No.	Player	Pos	Regular season						Playoffs					
No.	Player	Pos	GP	G	A	Pts	+/-	PIM	GP	G	A	Pts	+/-	PIM
26	Brian Propp	LW	72	40	57	97	24	47	5	0	2	2	−2	4
12	Tim Kerr	RW	76	58	26	84	−5	79	5	3	3	6	−2	8
2	Mark Howe	D	77	24	58	82	85	36	5	0	4	4	0	0
23	Ilkka Sinisalo	LW	74	39	37	76	17	31	5	2	2	4	1	2
20	Dave Poulin	C	79	27	42	69	20	49	5	2	0	2	−4	2
9	Pelle Eklund	C	70	15	51	66	−4	12	5	0	2	2	2	0
14	Ron Sutter	C	75	18	42	60	26	159	5	0	2	2	2	10
10	Brad McCrimmon	D	80	13	43	56	83	85	5	2	0	2	1	2
32	Murray Craven	LW	78	21	33	54	24	34	5	0	3	3	0	4
25	Peter Zezel	C	79	17	37	54	27	76	5	3	1	4	−2	4
3	Doug Crossman	D	80	6	37	43	−5	55	5	0	1	1	0	4
15	Rich Sutter	RW	78	14	25	39	28	199	5	2	0	2	2	19
22	Rick Tocchet	RW	69	14	21	35	12	284	5	1	2	3	1	26
18	Lindsay Carson	LW	50	9	12	21	10	84	1	0	0	0	0	5
21	Dave Brown	RW	76	10	7	17	7	277	5	0	0	0	−3	16
8	Brad Marsh	D	79	0	13	13	0	123	5	0	0	0	1	2
24	Derrick Smith	LW	69	6	6	12	14	57	4	0	0	0	−3	10
17	Ed Hospodar‡	D	17	3	1	4	0	55	—	—	—	—	—	—
27	Thomas Eriksson	D	43	0	4	4	−12	16	—	—	—	—	—	—
42	Don Nachbaur	C	5	1	1	2	3	7	—	—	—	—	—	—
37	Bo Berglund†	RW	7	0	2	2	0	4	—	—	—	—	—	—
34	Dave Richter†	D	50	0	2	2	−2	138	5	0	0	0	0	21
29	Daryl Stanley	D	33	0	2	2	−5	69	1	0	0	0	0	2
35	Bob Froese	G	51	0	1	1		8	5	0	1	1		0
30	Darren Jensen	G	29	0	1	1		2	—	—	—	—	—	—
44	Mike Stothers	D	6	0	1	1	1	6	3	0	0	0	0	4
39	Ross Fitzpatrick	C	2	0	0	0	−1	0	—	—	—	—	—	—
31	Pelle Lindbergh	G	8	0	0	0		0	—	—	—	—	—	—
5	Kevin McCarthy	D	4	0	0	0	0	4	—	—	—	—	—	—
19	Scott Mellanby	RW	2	0	0	0	−1	0	—	—	—	—	—	—
36	Carl Mokosak	LW	1	0	0	0	0	5	—	—	—	—	—	—
6	Joe Paterson‡	LW	5	0	0	0	1	12	—	—	—	—	—	—
33	Glenn Resch†	G	5	0	0	0		0	1	0	0	0		0
5	Steve Smith	D	2	0	0	0	−1	2	—	—	—	—	—	—

=== Goaltending ===
- † = Joined team via a transaction (e.g., trade, waivers, signing) during the season. Stats reflect time with the Flyers only.
- ‡ = Left team via a transaction (e.g., trade, waivers, release) during the season. Stats reflect time with the Flyers only.

No.	Player	Regular season											Playoffs									
No.	Player	GP	GS	W	L	T	SA	GA	GAA	SV%	SO	TOI	GP	GS	W	L	SA	GA	GAA	SV%	SO	TOI
35	Bob Froese	51	47	31	10	3	1270	116	2.55	.909	5	2,724	5	5	2	3	123	15	3.08	.878	0	292
30	Darren Jensen	29	23	15	9	1	753	88	3.69	.883	2	1,431	—	—	—	—	—	—	—	—	—	—
31	Pelle Lindbergh	8	8	6	2	0	200	23	2.88	.885	1	478	—	—	—	—	—	—	—	—	—	—
33	Glenn Resch†	5	2	1	2	0	84	10	3.23	.881	0	186	1	0	0	0	1	1	8.24	.000	0	7

== Awards and records ==
=== Awards ===
Type	Award/honor	Recipient	Ref
League (annual)	Emery Edge Award	Mark Howe	
League (annual)	NHL first All-Star team	Mark Howe (Defense)	
League (annual)	NHL second All-Star team	Bob Froese (Goaltender)	
League (annual)	William M. Jennings Trophy	Bob Froese	
League (annual)	William M. Jennings Trophy	Darren Jensen	
League (in-season)	NHL All-Star Game selection	Bob Froese	
League (in-season)	NHL All-Star Game selection	Mark Howe	
League (in-season)	NHL All-Star Game selection	Mike Keenan (Coach)	
League (in-season)	NHL All-Star Game selection	Tim Kerr (Note: Kerr was voted to the starting lineup.)	
League (in-season)	NHL All-Star Game selection	Pelle Lindbergh (Note: Lindbergh was posthumously voted to the starting lineup.)	
League (in-season)	NHL All-Star Game selection	Dave Poulin	
League (in-season)	NHL All-Star Game selection	Brian Propp	
League (in-season)	NHL Player of the Month	Bob Froese (March)	
League (in-season)	NHL Player of the Week	Bob Froese (December 29)	
League (in-season)	NHL Player of the Week	Bob Froese (January 9)	
League (in-season)	NHL Player of the Week	Bob Froese (March 17) (Note: Co-winner with Edmonton Oilers' Paul Coffey)	
Team	Barry Ashbee Trophy	Mark Howe	
Team	Bobby Clarke Trophy	Mark Howe	
Team	Class Guy Award	Murray Craven	

=== Records ===
Among the team records set during the 1985–86 season was a 13-game winning streak from October 19 to November 17. On November 3, Tim Kerr set a team record (since tied multiple times) by scoring three powerplay goals in a game. Pelle Eklund's nine consecutive games with an assist from March 2 to March 20 is a team rookie record. Kerr's 34 powerplay goals on the season is an NHL record. Mark Howe's +87 plus/minus rating is a franchise single season high and his seven shorthanded goals tied the franchise record. Howe also set franchise marks for defenseman for goals scored (24) and points (82). Eklund set the team rookie record for assists (51). The team's 53 wins on the season tied the high mark set during the previous season. Their four ties during the season is the fewest in team history, while the one home tie and three road ties is tied for the fewest.

During the second period of game four of their division semifinal series against the New York Rangers, the Flyers tied a team record for most goals in a single playoff period (5) and set a team record for fastest five-goals scored in a playoff game, taking seven minutes and forty-eight seconds to do so.

=== Milestones ===
Milestone	Player	Date	Ref
First game	Pelle Eklund	October 10, 1985	
First game	Scott Mellanby	March 22, 1986	

== Transactions ==
The Flyers were involved in the following transactions from May 31, 1985, the day after the deciding game of the 1985 Stanley Cup Final, through May 24, 1986, the day of the deciding game of the 1986 Stanley Cup Final.

=== Trades ===
Date	Details		Ref
October 11, 1985	To Philadelphia Flyers: Steve Seguin; 2nd-round pick in 1986	To Los Angeles Kings: Paul Guay; 4th-round pick in 1986	
November 7, 1985	To Philadelphia Flyers: Future considerations (Note: The Flyers claimed Low off waivers and agreed to a deal which allowed Edmonton to retain Low's rights but would guarantee them Low if Edmonton did not need him as a backup goaltender after Grant Fuhr recovered from an injury. On December 3, the Flyers passed on reacquiring Low and Edmonton returned him to their American Hockey League affiliate in Nova Scotia.)	To Edmonton Oilers: Ron Low	
November 29, 1985	To Philadelphia Flyers: Bo Berglund; Dave Richter	To Minnesota North Stars: Todd Bergen; Ed Hospodar	
December 5, 1985	To Philadelphia Flyers: Future considerations	To Los Angeles Kings: Len Hachborn	
December 18, 1985	To Philadelphia Flyers: Philadelphia's 4th-round pick in 1986	To Los Angeles Kings: Joe Paterson	
March 11, 1986	To Philadelphia Flyers: Glenn Resch	To New Jersey Devils: 3rd-round pick in 1986	

=== Players acquired ===
Date	Player	Former team	Via	Ref
July 19, 1985	Kevin McCarthy	Pittsburgh Penguins	Free agency	
July 26, 1985	Jim Dobson	Quebec Nordiques	Free agency	
July 26, 1985	Carl Mokosak	Los Angeles Kings	Free agency	
July 26, 1985	Tim Tookey	Pittsburgh Penguins	Free agency	
September 30, 1985	Steve Martinson	Toledo Goaldiggers (IHL)	Free agency	
October 7, 1985	Dave Farrish	Toronto Maple Leafs	Free agency	
October 8, 1985	Florent Robidoux	Milwaukee Admirals (IHL)	Free agency	
November 7, 1985	Ron Low	Edmonton Oilers	Waivers	
January 15, 1986	John Kemp	Canadian National Team	Free agency	
March 19, 1986	Craig Berube	Medicine Hat Tigers (WHL)	Free agency	

=== Players lost ===
Date	Player	New team	Via	Ref
June 10, 1985	Miroslav Dvorak	ESG Kassel (Germany)	Retirement (Note: Dvorak retired from the NHL.)	
August 22, 1985	Bill Barber		Retirement (Note: Barber missed the entire 1984–85 season due to a knee injury.)	
September 25, 1985	Todd Bergen	Minnesota North Stars (Note: Bergen was traded to Minnesota on November 29 and resumed his playing career.)	Retirement	
November 11, 1985	Pelle Lindbergh		Death	
N/A	Tim Young		Retirement	
N/A	Jim Dobson	New York Rangers (Note: Dobson signed with New York on December 13.)	Release	

=== Signings ===
Date	Player	Term	Ref
June 18, 1985	Pelle Eklund	2-year	
August 14, 1985	Ray Allison		
August 14, 1985	Ed Hospodar		
August 14, 1985	Brad Marsh		
August 14, 1985	Dave McLay		
August 14, 1985	John Stevens		
August 14, 1985	Rich Sutter		
August 14, 1985	Ron Sutter		
October 10, 1985	Pelle Lindbergh	6-year	
November 7, 1985	Jeff Chychrun		
March 13, 1986	Scott Mellanby		

== Draft picks ==
Philadelphia's picks at the 1985 NHL entry draft, which was held at the Toronto Convention Centre in Toronto, on June 15, 1985. The Flyers traded their tenth-round pick, 210th overall, to the Boston Bruins for Ian Armstrong on May 24, 1984.

Round	Pick	Player	Position	Nationality	Team (league)	Notes
1	21	Glen Seabrooke	Center	Canada	Peterborough Petes (OHL)	
2	42	Bruce Rendall	Left wing	Canada	Chatham Maroons (OPJHL)	
3	48	Darryl Gilmour	Goaltender	Canada	Moose Jaw Warriors (WHL)	(Note: The Flyers traded Paul Holmgren to the Minnesota North Stars for the rights to Paul Guay and the North Stars' third-round pick, 48th overall, on February 23, 1984.)
3	63	Shane Whelan	Center	Canada	Oshawa Generals (OHL)	
4	84	Paul Marshall	Defense	United States	Northwood School (N.Y.)	
5	105	Daril Holmes	Right wing	Canada	Kingston Canadians (OHL)	
6	126	Ken Alexander	Defense	United States	Kitchener Rangers (OHL)	
7	147	Tony Horacek	Left wing	Canada	Kelowna Wings (WHL)	
8	168	Mike Cusack	Forward	United States	Dubuque Fighting Saints (USHL)	
9	189	Gord Murphy	Defense	Canada	Oshawa Generals (OHL)	
11	231	Rod Williams	Right wing	Canada	Kelowna Wings (WHL)	
12	252	Paul Maurice	Defense	Canada	Windsor Compuware Spitfires (OHL)	

== Farm teams ==
The Flyers were affiliated with the Hershey Bears of the AHL and the Kalamazoo Wings of the IHL.
