= 1985–86 Detroit Red Wings season =

Sports season

1985–86 Detroit Red Wings
- Division: 5th Norris
- Conference: 10th Campbell
- 1985–86 record: 17–57–6
- Home record: 10–26–4
- Road record: 7–31–2
- Goals for: 266
- Goals against: 415

Team information
- General manager: Jim Devellano
- Coach: Harry Neale (Oct.–Dec.); Brad Park (Dec.–Apr.)
- Captain: Danny Gare
- Alternate captains: Mike O'Connell; Reed Larson
- Arena: Joe Louis Arena

Team leaders
- Goals: John Ogrodnick (38)
- Assists: Kelly Kisio (48)
- Points: John Ogrodnick (70)
- Penalty minutes: Joe Kocur (377)
- Wins: Greg Stefan (10)
- Goals against average: Greg Stefan (4.51)

The 1985–86 season was the team's 60th season, their 54th season as the Red Wings. The Red Wings missed the playoffs for the first time since the 1982–83 season by finishing dead last in the Norris Division, the Clarence Campbell Conference, and in the entire National Hockey League for the first time since the 1976–77 season with a record of 17 wins, 57 losses and 6 ties, for a total of 40 points, the worst record in franchise history In addition, they finished the season with the fewest goals scored of all NHL teams, the most goals against, and the most penalty minutes.

== Offseason ==
Former Vancouver Canucks head coach Harry Neale was hired as the team's new head coach on June 24, 1985. Previous head coach Nick Polano was named assistant general manager.

== Regular season ==
After starting the season with a league worst 8–23–4 record, Detroit fired head coach Neale on December 30 and replaced him with recently retired defenseman Brad Park.

=== Final standings ===
Norris Division
	GP	W	L	T	GF	GA	Pts
**Chicago Black Hawks**	80	39	33	8	351	349	86
**Minnesota North Stars**	80	38	33	9	327	305	85
**St. Louis Blues**	80	37	34	9	302	291	83
**Toronto Maple Leafs**	80	25	48	7	311	386	57
Detroit Red Wings	80	17	57	6	266	415	40

Note: GP = Games played, W = Wins, L = Losses, T = Ties, Pts = Points, GF = Goals for, GA = Goals against
Note: Teams that qualified for the playoffs are highlighted in bold.

=== Record vs. opponents ===
Norris Division record vs. opponents

==== Vs. Campbell Conference ====
**Vs. Norris Division**

1985–86 NHL records
Team	**CHI**	**DET**	**MIN**	**STL**	**TOR**	**Total**
Chicago	—	6−2	3−3−2	5−3	2−6	**16−14−2**
Detroit	2−6	—	1−6−1	2−5−1	3−4−1	**8−21−3**
Minnesota	3−3−2	6−1−1	—	4−3−1	7−0−1	**20−7−5**
St. Louis	3−5	5−2−1	3−4−1	—	3−3−2	**14−14−4**
Toronto	6−2	4−3−1	0−7−1	3−3−2	—	**13−15−4**

**Vs. Smythe Division**

1985–86 NHL records
Team	**CGY**	**EDM**	**LAK**	**VAN**	**WIN**	**Total**
Chicago	2−1	0−3	1−0−2	3−0	2−1	**8−5−2**
Detroit	0−2−1	0−3	2−1	0−3	0−3	**2−12−1**
Minnesota	2−0−1	1−2	1−2	1−2	1−2	**6−8−1**
St. Louis	2−1	1−1−1	1−1−1	3−0	2−1	**9−4−2**
Toronto	1−2	1−2	1−2	0−2−1	1−1−1	**4−9−2**

**Vs. Wales Conference**

**Vs. Adams Division**

1985–86 NHL records
Team	**BOS**	**BUF**	**HFD**	**MTL**	**QUE**	**Total**
Chicago	2−1	2−1	2−1	0−2−1	1−2	**7−7−1**
Detroit	1−2	1−1−1	1−2	0−3	1−2	**4−10−1**
Minnesota	0−3	1−2	2−1	1−1−1	1−2	**5−9−1**
St. Louis	2−1	1−2	1−1−1	2−1	2−1	**8−6−1**
Toronto	0−2−1	2−1	0−3	1−2	0−3	**3−11−1**

**Vs. Patrick Division**

1985–86 NHL records
Team	**NJD**	**NYI**	**NYR**	**PHI**	**PIT**	**WSH**	**Total**
Chicago	1−2	2−0−1	3−0	0−2−1	1−1−1	1−2	**8−7−3**
Detroit	0−2−1	0−3	0−3	1−2	1−2	1−2	**3−14−1**
Minnesota	2−1	2−0−1	2−1	0−2−1	0−3	1−2	**7−9−2**
St. Louis	2−1	1−1−1	1−1−1	1−2	1−2	0−3	**6−10−2**
Toronto	2−1	0−3	1−2	1−2	0−3	1−2	**5−13−0**

== Schedule and results ==
1985–86 regular season
October

Game	Result	Date	Score	Opponent	Record
1	T	October 10, 1985	6–6 OT	Minnesota North Stars (1985–86)	0–0–1
2	L	October 12, 1985	2–9	Boston Bruins (1985–86)	0–1–1
3	L	October 14, 1985	1–6	@ Buffalo Sabres (1985–86)	0–2–1
4	L	October 16, 1985	3–4	Winnipeg Jets (1985–86)	0–3–1
5	L	October 17, 1985	1–10	@ Minnesota North Stars (1985–86)	0–4–1
6	L	October 19, 1985	2–6	Chicago Black Hawks (1985–86)	0–5–1
7	L	October 23, 1985	0–5	Vancouver Canucks (1985–86)	0–6–1
8	L	October 26, 1985	4–7	@ Calgary Flames (1985–86)	0–7–1
9	L	October 27, 1985	3–5	@ Winnipeg Jets (1985–86)	0–8–1
10	W	October 30, 1985	6–3	Pittsburgh Penguins (1985–86)	1–8–1
11	T	October 31, 1985	2–2 OT	@ New Jersey Devils (1985–86)	1–8–2

November

Game	Result	Date	Score	Opponent	Record
12	T	November 2, 1985	5–5 OT	@ St. Louis Blues (1985–86)	1–8–3
13	W	November 6, 1985	4–2	St. Louis Blues (1985–86)	2–8–3
14	T	November 8, 1985	3–3 OT	Toronto Maple Leafs (1985–86)	2–8–4
15	L	November 11, 1985	0–5	@ Vancouver Canucks (1985–86)	2–9–4
16	W	November 13, 1985	7–2	@ Los Angeles Kings (1985–86)	3–9–4
17	W	November 16, 1985	4–2	@ Minnesota North Stars (1985–86)	4–9–4
18	L	November 19, 1985	5–7	Vancouver Canucks (1985–86)	4–10–4
19	L	November 21, 1985	4–5 OT	Los Angeles Kings (1985–86)	4–11–4
20	L	November 23, 1985	3–9	@ Toronto Maple Leafs (1985–86)	4–12–4
21	W	November 27, 1985	4–1	Buffalo Sabres (1985–86)	5–12–4
22	W	November 29, 1985	5–3	St. Louis Blues (1985–86)	6–12–4
23	L	November 30, 1985	1–10	@ Montreal Canadiens (1985–86)	6–13–4

December

Game	Result	Date	Score	Opponent	Record
24	W	December 3, 1985	4–1	Philadelphia Flyers (1985–86)	7–13–4
25	L	December 4, 1985	2–5	@ Pittsburgh Penguins (1985–86)	7–14–4
26	L	December 7, 1985	4–5	@ St. Louis Blues (1985–86)	7–15–4
27	L	December 11, 1985	2–10	Minnesota North Stars (1985–86)	7–16–4
28	L	December 14, 1985	4–6	Philadelphia Flyers (1985–86)	7–17–4
29	L	December 15, 1985	4–6	@ Chicago Black Hawks (1985–86)	7–18–4
30	L	December 17, 1985	3–6	@ Minnesota North Stars (1985–86)	7–19–4
31	L	December 21, 1985	3–6	Chicago Black Hawks (1985–86)	7–20–4
32	L	December 23, 1985	2–10	@ New York Rangers (1985–86)	7–21–4
33	L	December 26, 1985	4–5	Toronto Maple Leafs (1985–86)	7–22–4
34	W	December 28, 1985	5–4	@ Quebec Nordiques (1985–86)	8–22–4
35	L	December 29, 1985	2–5	@ Hartford Whalers (1985–86)	8–23–4
36	L	December 31, 1985	4–5 OT	New York Islanders (1985–86)	8–24–4

January

Game	Result	Date	Score	Opponent	Record
37	T	January 2, 1986	2–2 OT	Buffalo Sabres (1985–86)	8–24–5
38	L	January 4, 1986	2–7	Quebec Nordiques (1985–86)	8–25–5
39	W	January 5, 1986	6–5	@ Toronto Maple Leafs (1985–86)	9–25–5
40	L	January 7, 1986	3–4	@ Washington Capitals (1985–86)	9–26–5
41	L	January 10, 1986	4–9	Chicago Black Hawks (1985–86)	9–27–5
42	L	January 11, 1986	2–8	@ New York Islanders (1985–86)	9–28–5
43	L	January 13, 1986	4–7	@ Toronto Maple Leafs (1985–86)	9–29–5
44	L	January 15, 1986	3–4 OT	New Jersey Devils (1985–86)	9–30–5
45	L	January 18, 1986	4–7	Calgary Flames (1985–86)	9–31–5
46	L	January 19, 1986	4–6	@ Chicago Black Hawks (1985–86)	9–32–5
47	W	January 22, 1986	6–5 OT	Boston Bruins (1985–86)	10–32–5
48	L	January 23, 1986	2–5	@ Philadelphia Flyers (1985–86)	10–33–5
49	L	January 25, 1986	3–6	@ Boston Bruins (1985–86)	10–34–5
50	W	January 28, 1986	7–0	Washington Capitals (1985–86)	11–34–5
51	L	January 31, 1986	4–6	St. Louis Blues (1985–86)	11–35–5

February

Game	Result	Date	Score	Opponent	Record
52	L	February 1, 1986	3–4	@ St. Louis Blues (1985–86)	11–36–5
53	W	February 6, 1986	4–3 OT	Hartford Whalers (1985–86)	12–36–5
54	L	February 8, 1986	3–5	Montreal Canadiens (1985–86)	12–37–5
55	L	February 11, 1986	2–3	Edmonton Oilers (1985–86)	12–38–5
56	L	February 14, 1986	5–7	New York Rangers (1985–86)	12–39–5
57	L	February 16, 1986	1–3	@ New York Rangers (1985–86)	12–40–5
58	L	February 18, 1986	0–5	@ St. Louis Blues (1985–86)	12–41–5
59	L	February 21, 1986	3–7	Pittsburgh Penguins (1985–86)	12–42–5
60	L	February 22, 1986	2–5	@ New York Islanders (1985–86)	12–43–5
61	L	February 25, 1986	3–4 OT	@ Washington Capitals (1985–86)	12–44–5
62	L	February 28, 1986	3–7	Toronto Maple Leafs (1985–86)	12–45–5

March

Game	Result	Date	Score	Opponent	Record
63	W	March 1, 1986	6–4	@ Toronto Maple Leafs (1985–86)	13–45–5
64	L	March 3, 1986	5–8	Minnesota North Stars (1985–86)	13–46–5
65	W	March 5, 1986	8–3	@ Chicago Black Hawks (1985–86)	14–46–5
66	L	March 6, 1986	2–7	@ New Jersey Devils (1985–86)	14–47–5
67	T	March 9, 1986	3–3 OT	Calgary Flames (1985–86)	14–47–6
68	W	March 12, 1986	3–0	@ Los Angeles Kings (1985–86)	15–47–6
69	L	March 14, 1986	3–12	@ Edmonton Oilers (1985–86)	15–48–6
70	L	March 16, 1986	0–6	@ Winnipeg Jets (1985–86)	15–49–6
71	L	March 18, 1986	4–6	Hartford Whalers (1985–86)	15–50–6
72	L	March 20, 1986	2–3 OT	St. Louis Blues (1985–86)	15–51–6
73	W	March 22, 1986	8–4	Chicago Black Hawks (1985–86)	16–51–6
74	L	March 25, 1986	2–7	Edmonton Oilers (1985–86)	16–52–6
75	L	March 26, 1986	3–5	@ Chicago Black Hawks (1985–86)	16–53–6
76	L	March 29, 1986	4–5	Minnesota North Stars (1985–86)	16–54–6

April

Game	Result	Date	Score	Opponent	Record
77	L	April 1, 1986	0–4	@ Quebec Nordiques (1985–86)	16–55–6
78	L	April 2, 1986	3–6	@ Montreal Canadiens (1985–86)	16–56–6
79	L	April 5, 1986	3–5	@ Minnesota North Stars (1985–86)	16–57–6
80	W	April 6, 1986	4–2	Toronto Maple Leafs (1985–86)	17–57–6

Legend: Win (2 points) Loss (0 points) Tie (1 point)

== Player statistics ==
=== Regular season ===
Scoring

Player	Pos	GP	G	A	Pts	PIM	+/−	PPG	SHG	GWG
John Ogrodnick	LW	76	38	32	70	18	−30	15	1	2
Kelly Kisio	C	76	21	48	69	85	−21	7	3	0
Reed Larson	D	67	19	41	60	109	−36	11	0	0
Petr Klima	W	74	32	24	56	16	−39	8	0	4
Ron Duguay	C/RW	67	19	29	48	26	−30	8	0	2
Warren Young	C	79	22	24	46	161	−34	9	0	1
Steve Yzerman	C	51	14	28	42	16	−24	3	0	3
Gerard Gallant	LW	52	20	19	39	106	−10	3	1	2
Greg Smith	D	62	5	19	24	84	−14	0	0	0
Claude Loiselle	C	48	7	15	22	142	−27	2	0	1
Chris Cichocki	RW	59	10	11	21	21	−8	1	1	0
Bob Probert	LW	44	8	13	21	186	−14	3	0	0
Adam Oates	C	38	9	11	20	10	−24	1	0	1
Dwight Foster	RW	55	6	12	18	48	−13	1	1	0
Randy Ladouceur	D	78	5	13	18	196	−54	0	0	1
Danny Gare	RW	57	7	9	16	102	−19	1	0	0
Joe Kocur	RW	59	9	6	15	377	−24	2	0	0
John Barrett	D	65	2	12	14	125	−29	0	0	0
Jim Leavins	D	37	2	11	13	26	−23	1	0	0
Mike McEwen	D	29	0	10	10	16	−8	0	0	0
Mike O'Connell	D	13	1	7	8	16	−6	0	1	0
Billy Carroll	C	21	2	4	6	11	−8	0	0	0
Harold Snepsts	D	35	0	6	6	75	−7	0	0	0
Lane Lambert	RW	34	2	3	5	130	−11	0	0	0
Doug Shedden	C	11	2	3	5	2	−1	2	0	0
Darren Veitch	D	13	0	5	5	2	−9	0	0	0
Steve Richmond	D	29	1	2	3	82	−18	0	0	0
Tim Friday	D	23	0	3	3	6	−9	0	0	0
Ted Speers	RW	4	1	1	2	0	2	0	0	0
Glenn Merkosky	C	17	0	2	2	0	−12	0	0	0
Greg Stefan	G	37	0	2	2	23	0	0	0	0
Shawn Burr	LW/C	5	1	0	1	4	1	1	0	0
Eddie Johnstone	RW	3	1	0	1	2	0	0	0	0
Bruce Eakin	C	4	0	1	1	0	−4	0	0	0
Eddie Mio	G	18	0	1	1	17	0	0	0	0
Ray Staszak	RW	4	0	1	1	7	−3	0	0	0
Rick Zombo	D	14	0	1	1	16	−10	0	0	0
Doug Houda	D	6	0	0	0	4	−7	0	0	0
Mark LaForest	G	28	0	0	0	23	0	0	0	0
Basil McRae	LW	4	0	0	0	5	−4	0	0	0
Barry Melrose	D	14	0	0	0	70	−6	0	0	0
Corrado Micalef	G	11	0	0	0	8	0	0	0	0
Chris Pusey	G	1	0	0	0	0	0	0	0	0

Goaltending

Player	MIN	GP	W	L	T	GA	GAA	SO	SA	SV	SV%
Greg Stefan	2068	37	10	20	5	155	4.50	1	1080	925	.856
Mark LaForest	1383	28	4	21	0	114	4.95	1	742	628	.846
Eddie Mio	788	18	2	7	0	83	6.32	0	453	370	.817
Corrado Micalef	565	11	1	9	1	52	5.52	0	342	290	.848
Chris Pusey	40	1	0	0	0	3	4.50	0	12	9	.750
Team:	4844	80	17	57	6	407	5.04	2	2629	2222	.845

Note: GP = Games played; G = Goals; A = Assists; Pts = Points; +/- = Plus-minus PIM = Penalty minutes; PPG = Power-play goals; SHG = Short-handed goals; GWG = Game-winning goals;
MIN = Minutes played; W = Wins; L = Losses; T = Ties; GA = Goals against; GAA = Goals-against average; SO = Shutouts; SA=Shots against; SV=Shots saved; SV% = Save percentage;

== Awards and records ==
This team set the NHL record for most fighting majors in a season with 154. 415 goals against is also the most by a team in a single season.

== Draft picks ==
Detroit's draft picks at the 1985 NHL entry draft held at the Metro Toronto Convention Centre in Toronto, Ontario.

Round	#	Player	Nationality	College/Junior/Club team (League)
1	8	Brent Fedyk	Canada	Regina Pats (WHL)
2	29	Jeff Sharples	Canada	Kelowna Wings (WHL)
3	50	Steve Chiasson	Canada	Guelph Platers (OHL)
4	71	Mark Gowans	United States	Windsor Compuware Spitfires (OHL)
5	92	Chris Luongo	United States	St. Clair Shores Falcons (NAHL)
6	113	Randy McKay	Canada	Michigan Technological University (WCHA)
7	134	Thomas Bjuhr	Sweden	AIK IF (Sweden)
8	155	Mike Luckraft	United States	Burnsville High School (USHS-MN)
9	176	Rob Schena	United States	St. John's School (USHS-MA)
10	197	Erik Hamalainen	Finland	Lukko (Finland)
11	218	Bo Svanberg	Sweden	Färjestad BK (Sweden)
12	239	Mikael Lindman	Sweden	AIK IF (Sweden)

== See also ==
- 1985–86 NHL season
