= 1985–86 Washington Capitals season =

NHL hockey team season

1985–86 Washington Capitals
- Division: 2nd Patrick
- Conference: 2nd Wales
- 1985–86 record: 50–23–7
- Home record: 30–8–2
- Road record: 20–15–5
- Goals for: 315
- Goals against: 272

Team information
- General manager: David Poile
- Coach: Bryan Murray
- Captain: Rod Langway
- Arena: Capital Centre

Team leaders
- Goals: Dave Christian (41)
- Assists: Bengt-Ake Gustafsson (52)
- Points: Dave Christian (83)
- Penalty minutes: Scott Stevens (165)
- Plus/minus: Alan Haworth (+36)
- Wins: Al Jensen (28)
- Goals against average: Al Jensen (3.19)

The Washington Capitals are a professional American ice hockey team based in Washington, D.C.; in the 1985–86 season, the team finished with 107 points and won 50 games for the first time in franchise history, good enough for the third-best record in the National Hockey League (NHL). However, they were bounced out of the playoffs in the second round by the New York Rangers.

The 107 points scored by the Capitals in this season would not be surpassed until the 2008–09 season, when the team scored 108 points in the regular season.

== Offseason ==
The Washington Capitals picked up Yvon Corriveau in the first round (19th overall) of the 1985 NHL entry draft.

== Regular season ==
The fifty wins which the Washington Capitals won during the regular season placed them second in the Patrick Division, after the Philadelphia Flyers, and earned them a berth in the playoffs, which was the fourth consecutive time it had made the playoffs since the 1982–83 NHL season.

=== Final standings ===
Patrick Division
	GP	W	L	T	GF	GA	Pts
**Philadelphia Flyers**	80	53	23	4	335	241	110
**Washington Capitals**	80	50	23	7	315	272	107
**New York Islanders**	80	39	29	12	327	284	90
**New York Rangers**	80	36	38	6	280	276	78
Pittsburgh Penguins	80	34	38	8	313	305	76
New Jersey Devils	80	28	49	3	300	374	59

Note: GP = Games played, W = Wins, L = Losses, T = Ties, Pts = Points, GF = Goals for, GA = Goals against
Note: Teams that qualified for the playoffs are highlighted in bold.

=== Record vs. opponents ===
Patrick Division record vs. opponents

==== Vs. Wales Conference ====
**Vs. Patrick Division**

1985–86 NHL records
Team	**NJD**	**NYI**	**NYR**	**PHI**	**PIT**	**WSH**	**Total**
New Jersey	—	2−5	2−5	3−4	2−4−1	1−6	10−24−1
N.Y. Islanders	5−2	—	3−3−1	4−3	5−1−1	3−4	20−13−2
N.Y. Rangers	5−2	3−3−1	—	1−6	2−4−1	3−3−1	14−18−3
Philadelphia	4−3	3−4	6−1	—	6−0−1	5−2	24−10−1
Pittsburgh	4−2−1	1−5−1	4−2−1	0–6−1	—	1−6	10−21−4
Washington	6−1	4−3	3−3−1	2–5	6−1	—	21−13−1

**Vs. Adams Division**

1985–86 NHL records
Team	**BOS**	**BUF**	**HFD**	**MTL**	**QUE**	**Total**
New Jersey	0−3	1−2	1−2	1−2	2−1	5−10−0
N.Y. Islanders	1−0−2	1−2	2−1	1−2	1−2	6−7−2
N.Y. Rangers	2−1	0−3	1−2	2−0−1	0−2−1	5−8−2
Philadelphia	2−1	1−2	3−0	2−1	1−1−1	9−5−1
Pittsburgh	1−2	2−0−1	1−2	0−2−1	1−1−1	5−7−3
Washington	2−0−1	1−1−1	2−0−1	2−0−1	3−0	10−1−4

==== Vs. Campbell Conference ====
**Vs. Norris Division**

1985–86 NHL records
Team	**CHI**	**DET**	**MIN**	**STL**	**TOR**	**Total**
New Jersey	2−1	2−0−1	1−2	1−2	1−2	7−7−1
N.Y. Islanders	0−2−1	3−0	0−2−1	1−1−1	3−0	7−5−3
N.Y. Rangers	0−3	3−0	1−2	1−1−1	2−1	7−7−1
Philadelphia	2−0−1	2−1	2−0−1	2−1	2−1	10−3−2
Pittsburgh	1−1−1	2−1	3−0	2−1	3−0	11−3−1
Washington	2−1	2−1	2−1	3−0	2−1	11−4−0

**Vs. Smythe Division**

1985–86 NHL records
Team	**CGY**	**EDM**	**LAK**	**VAN**	**WIN**	**Total**
New Jersey	0−2−1	0−3	2−1	2−1	2−1	6−8−1
N.Y. Islanders	1−1−1	0−1−2	2−1	1−1−1	2−0−1	6−4−5
N.Y. Rangers	1−2	2−1	2−1	3−0	2−1	10−5−0
Philadelphia	2−1	1−2	3−0	2−1	2−1	10−5−0
Pittsburgh	1−2	1−2	2−1	2−1	2−1	8−7−0
Washington	0−3	3−0	2−1	2−0−1	1−1−1	8−5−2

== Schedule and results ==
1985–86 regular season
October

Game	Result	Date	Score	Opponent	Record
1	L	October 10, 1985	2–4	@ New York Rangers (1985–86)	0–1–0
2	L	October 12, 1985	1–4	@ New Jersey Devils (1985–86)	0–2–0
3	L	October 13, 1985	2–4	Philadelphia Flyers (1985–86)	0–3–0
4	W	October 16, 1985	6–5 OT	@ Toronto Maple Leafs (1985–86)	1–3–0
5	W	October 18, 1985	4–1	@ Buffalo Sabres (1985–86)	2–3–0
6	T	October 19, 1985	2–2 OT	Buffalo Sabres (1985–86)	2–3–1
7	L	October 23, 1985	2–4	@ Calgary Flames (1985–86)	2–4–1
8	T	October 25, 1985	7–7 OT	@ Winnipeg Jets (1985–86)	2–4–2
9	W	October 27, 1985	4–2	@ Chicago Black Hawks (1985–86)	3–4–2
10	W	October 29, 1985	6–3	St. Louis Blues (1985–86)	4–4–2

November

Game	Result	Date	Score	Opponent	Record
11	W	November 1, 1985	5–3	New York Islanders (1985–86)	5–4–2
12	L	November 2, 1985	3–5	@ New York Islanders (1985–86)	5–5–2
13	W	November 5, 1985	8–4	Chicago Black Hawks (1985–86)	6–5–2
14	W	November 6, 1985	4–1	@ Pittsburgh Penguins (1985–86)	7–5–2
15	L	November 9, 1985	4–5	Calgary Flames (1985–86)	7–6–2
16	W	November 12, 1985	5–2	Edmonton Oilers (1985–86)	8–6–2
17	W	November 15, 1985	5–3	Vancouver Canucks (1985–86)	9–6–2
18	T	November 16, 1985	2–2 OT	@ Boston Bruins (1985–86)	9–6–3
19	W	November 19, 1985	4–3	Pittsburgh Penguins (1985–86)	10–6–3
20	W	November 20, 1985	3–1	@ Pittsburgh Penguins (1985–86)	11–6–3
21	W	November 23, 1985	3–0	Quebec Nordiques (1985–86)	12–6–3
22	W	November 27, 1985	5–3	Montreal Canadiens (1985–86)	13–6–3
23	L	November 29, 1985	2–5	New York Rangers (1985–86)	13–7–3
24	W	November 30, 1985	6–2	@ New Jersey Devils (1985–86)	14–7–3

December

Game	Result	Date	Score	Opponent	Record
25	W	December 5, 1985	3–2 OT	St. Louis Blues (1985–86)	15–7–3
26	W	December 7, 1985	2–1	Vancouver Canucks (1985–86)	16–7–3
27	W	December 10, 1985	3–2	Toronto Maple Leafs (1985–86)	17–7–3
28	W	December 14, 1985	5–4	@ Los Angeles Kings (1985–86)	18–7–3
29	T	December 17, 1985	4–4 OT	@ Vancouver Canucks (1985–86)	18–7–4
30	W	December 18, 1985	5–2	@ Edmonton Oilers (1985–86)	19–7–4
31	L	December 20, 1985	4–7	@ Winnipeg Jets (1985–86)	19–8–4
32	W	December 22, 1985	7–5	@ Quebec Nordiques (1985–86)	20–8–4
33	W	December 26, 1985	4–3	Quebec Nordiques (1985–86)	21–8–4
34	L	December 28, 1985	4–7	Chicago Black Hawks (1985–86)	21–9–4
35	L	December 29, 1985	5–6	@ New York Rangers (1985–86)	21–10–4

January

Game	Result	Date	Score	Opponent	Record
36	W	January 1, 1986	3–0	New York Rangers (1985–86)	22–10–4
37	W	January 3, 1986	3–2	@ New Jersey Devils (1985–86)	23–10–4
38	W	January 4, 1986	9–3	New Jersey Devils (1985–86)	24–10–4
39	W	January 7, 1986	4–3	Detroit Red Wings (1985–86)	25–10–4
40	L	January 9, 1986	0–4	@ Philadelphia Flyers (1985–86)	25–11–4
41	L	January 11, 1986	3–5	@ Minnesota North Stars (1985–86)	25–12–4
42	L	January 14, 1986	3–4	Calgary Flames (1985–86)	25–13–4
43	W	January 17, 1986	4–3	@ New Jersey Devils (1985–86)	26–13–4
44	W	January 18, 1986	5–2	Philadelphia Flyers (1985–86)	27–13–4
45	W	January 21, 1986	7–5	Minnesota North Stars (1985–86)	28–13–4
46	L	January 24, 1986	5–7	New York Islanders (1985–86)	28–14–4
47	W	January 25, 1986	6–3	@ Minnesota North Stars (1985–86)	29–14–4
48	L	January 28, 1986	0–7	@ Detroit Red Wings (1985–86)	29–15–4
49	L	January 29, 1986	2–5	@ Toronto Maple Leafs (1985–86)	29–16–4

February

Game	Result	Date	Score	Opponent	Record
50	W	February 1, 1986	5–4	New Jersey Devils (1985–86)	30–16–4
51	W	February 2, 1986	5–4	@ Hartford Whalers (1985–86)	31–16–4
52	W	February 7, 1986	3–2	Montreal Canadiens (1985–86)	32–16–4
53	W	February 8, 1986	5–4 OT	Edmonton Oilers (1985–86)	33–16–4
54	L	February 12, 1986	1–8	@ Pittsburgh Penguins (1985–86)	33–17–4
55	W	February 15, 1986	4–1	@ Los Angeles Kings (1985–86)	34–17–4
56	W	February 18, 1986	5–4	@ New York Islanders (1985–86)	35–17–4
57	T	February 19, 1986	4–4 OT	@ Montreal Canadiens (1985–86)	35–17–5
58	L	February 22, 1986	1–3	@ Philadelphia Flyers (1985–86)	35–18–5
59	L	February 23, 1986	1–4	@ Buffalo Sabres (1985–86)	35–19–5
60	W	February 25, 1986	4–3 OT	Detroit Red Wings (1985–86)	36–19–5
61	W	February 27, 1986	2–1	@ Boston Bruins (1985–86)	37–19–5

March

Game	Result	Date	Score	Opponent	Record
62	W	March 1, 1986	4–0	New York Rangers (1985–86)	38–19–5
63	W	March 2, 1986	4–2	@ New York Rangers (1985–86)	39–19–5
64	W	March 4, 1986	4–2	New Jersey Devils (1985–86)	40–19–5
65	W	March 8, 1986	6–2	@ New York Islanders (1985–86)	41–19–5
66	W	March 9, 1986	3–1	New York Islanders (1985–86)	42–19–5
67	W	March 11, 1986	5–3	Pittsburgh Penguins (1985–86)	43–19–5
68	L	March 13, 1986	0–2	@ Philadelphia Flyers (1985–86)	43–20–5
69	W	March 15, 1986	5–4	@ St. Louis Blues (1985–86)	44–20–5
70	W	March 17, 1986	5–3	@ Pittsburgh Penguins (1985–86)	45–20–5
71	L	March 18, 1986	2–5	Los Angeles Kings (1985–86)	45–21–5
72	W	March 21, 1986	5–3	Winnipeg Jets (1985–86)	46–21–5
73	W	March 23, 1986	6–5	Philadelphia Flyers (1985–86)	47–21–5
74	W	March 25, 1986	6–3	Boston Bruins (1985–86)	48–21–5
75	L	March 28, 1986	3–4	New York Islanders (1985–86)	48–22–5
76	T	March 29, 1986	6–6 OT	@ Hartford Whalers (1985–86)	48–22–6

April

Game	Result	Date	Score	Opponent	Record
77	W	April 1, 1986	5–3	Pittsburgh Penguins (1985–86)	49–22–6
78	W	April 3, 1986	4–2	Hartford Whalers (1985–86)	50–22–6
79	T	April 5, 1986	4–4 OT	New York Rangers (1985–86)	50–22–7
80	L	April 6, 1986	3–5	@ Philadelphia Flyers (1985–86)	50–23–7

Legend: Win (2 points) Loss (0 points) Tie (1 point)

== Playoffs ==
The 1985–86 NHL season was the fourth time the Washington Capitals had made the playoffs, and finally defeated the New York Islanders in a playoff series three games to none. However, the Capitals were eliminated by the New York Rangers four games to two in a best of seven series.

=== Patrick Division Semi-finals ===
New York Islanders vs. Washington Capitals

April 9	New York Islanders	1–3	Washington Capitals	Capital Centre	Recap
Clark Gillies (1) – 16:25		First period	10:12 – Gaetan Duchesne (1)
No scoring		Second period	11:46 – Bobby Carpenter (1)
No scoring		Third period	12:16 – Dave Christian (1)
Kelly Hrudey 33 saves / 36 shots		Goalie stats	Pete Peeters 32 saves / 33 shots

April 10	New York Islanders	2–5	Washington Capitals	Capital Centre	Recap
Pat LaFontaine (1) – pp – 19:48		First period	06:22 – Gaetan Duchesne (2)
Bryan Trottier (1) – 18:26		Second period	04:22 – Greg Smith (1); 18:35 – Scott Stevens (1)
No scoring		Third period	00:58 – Bobby Gould (1); 19:45 – Bobby Gould (2)
Billy Smith 29 saves / 33 shots		Goalie stats	Pete Peeters 27 saves / 29 shots

April 12	Washington Capitals	3–1	New York Islanders	Nassau Coliseum	Recap
Rod Langway (1) – pp – 13:20		First period	No scoring
Scott Stevens (2) – pp – 07:18; Larry Murphy (1) – pp – 15:08		Second period	No scoring
No scoring		Third period	05:12 – Mike Bossy (1)
Pete Peeters 27 saves / 28 shots		Goalie stats	Kelly Hrudey 20 saves / 23 shots

Washington won series 3–0

=== Patrick Divisional Finals ===
New York Rangers vs. Washington Capitals

April 17	New York Rangers	4–3	OT	Washington Capitals	Capital Centre	Recap
Brian MacLellan (1) – 11:48		First period		08:46 – Dave Christian (2); 12:39 – Bobby Gould (3)
Mark Osborne (2) – sh – 17:33		Second period		06:39 – Alan Haworth (1)
Mike Ridley (4) – 09:37		Third period		No scoring
Brian MacLellan (2) – 01:16		First overtime period		No scoring
John Vanbiesbrouck 24 saves / 27 shots		Goalie stats		Pete Peeters 19 saves / 23 shots

April 19	New York Rangers	1–8	Washington Capitals	Capital Centre	Recap
No scoring		First period	09:27 – Mike Gartner (1); 11:38 – Craig Laughlin (1); 19:03 – Alan Haworth (2)
Larry Melnyk (1) – 05:12		Second period	06:46 – Gaetan Duchesne (3); 14:08 – sh – Gaetan Duchesne (4)
No scoring		Third period	03:00 – pp – Jorgen Pettersson (1); 11:19 – pp – Alan Haworth (3); 13:22 – Greg Adams (1)
John Vanbiesbrouck 21 saves / 26 shots Glen Hanlon 10 saves / 13 shots		Goalie stats	Pete Peeters 19 saves / 20 shots

April 21	Washington Capitals	6–3	New York Rangers	Madison Square Garden	Recap
Bobby Carpenter (2) – 03:06; Mike Gartner (2) – 06:45		First period	No scoring
Bobby Carpenter (3) – 02:42; John Barrett (1) – 04:09		Second period	No scoring
John Barrett (2) – 04:37; Alan Haworth (4) – 09:44		Third period	04:08 – pp – Pierre Larouche (4); 07:50 – pp – Wilf Paiement (1); 17:56 – Pierre Larouche (5)
Pete Peeters 39 saves / 42 shots		Goalie stats	John Vanbiesbrouck 22 saves / 28 shots

April 23	Washington Capitals	5–6	OT	New York Rangers	Madison Square Garden	Recap
Dave Christian (3) – 07:15; Kevin Hatcher (1) – 10:49; Bobby Carpenter (4) – pp – 13:19		First period		06:47 – pp – Wilf Paiement (2)
Bobby Gould (4) – 18:59		Second period		04:42 – Mike Ridley (5); 08:29 – Tomas Sandström (1)
Greg Smith (2) – sh – 07:45		Third period		08:09 – pp – Willie Huber (2); 17:25 – Bob Brooke (3)
No scoring		First overtime period		02:40 – Bob Brooke (4)
Pete Peeters 24 saves / 30 shots		Goalie stats		John Vanbiesbrouck 24 saves / 29 shots

April 25	New York Rangers	4–2	Washington Capitals	Capital Centre	Recap
Pierre Larouche (6) – 04:05; Wilf Paiement (3) – pp – 13:40		First period	02:51 – pp – Dave Christian (4); 03:34 – pp – Scott Stevens (3)
Tomas Sandström (2) – 13:49		Second period	No scoring
Don Maloney (2) – 02:12		Third period	No scoring
John Vanbiesbrouck 30 saves / 32 shots		Goalie stats	Pete Peeters 23 saves / 27 shots

April 27	Washington Capitals	1–2	New York Rangers	Madison Square Garden	Recap
No scoring		First period	12:36 – Pierre Larouche (7)
No scoring		Second period	No scoring
Bobby Carpenter (5) – pp – 05:38		Third period	00:34 – pp – Pierre Larouche (8)
Pete Peeters 19 saves / 21 shots		Goalie stats	John Vanbiesbrouck 27 saves / 28 shots

New York Rangers won series 4–2

== Player statistics ==
=== Regular season ===
Scoring

Player	Pos	GP	G	A	Pts	PIM	+/-	PPG	SHG	GWG
Dave Christian	RW	80	41	42	83	15	3	18	2	4
Mike Gartner	RW	74	35	40	75	63	-5	11	2	4
Craig Laughlin	RW	75	30	45	75	43	24	10	0	4
Bengt-Ake Gustafsson	RW	70	23	52	75	26	9	8	4	6
Alan Haworth	C	71	34	39	73	72	36	7	0	5
Larry Murphy	D	78	21	44	65	50	2	8	1	2
Bobby Carpenter	C	80	27	29	56	105	-12	7	0	3
Greg Adams	LW	78	18	38	56	152	24	3	0	2
Scott Stevens	D	73	15	38	53	165	0	3	0	2
Gaetan Duchesne	LW	80	11	28	39	39	10	0	1	3
Bobby Gould	RW	79	19	19	38	26	7	0	3	5
Jorgen Pettersson	LW	47	8	16	24	10	-4	2	0	3
Peter Andersson	D	61	6	16	22	36	-8	3	0	3
Lou Franceschetti	RW	76	7	14	21	131	-4	0	0	2
Kevin Hatcher	D	79	9	10	19	119	6	1	0	1
Rod Langway	D	71	1	17	18	61	27	1	0	0
Darren Veitch	D	62	3	9	12	27	21	0	0	0
Gary Sampson	LW	19	1	4	5	2	-3	0	0	1
Mark Taylor	C	30	2	1	3	4	-4	0	0	0
Doug Jarvis	C	25	1	2	3	16	-5	0	0	0
Dwight Schofield	D	50	1	2	3	127	5	0	0	0
John Barrett	D	14	0	3	3	12	3	0	0	0
Greg Smith	D	14	0	3	3	10	3	0	0	0
Stephen Leach	RW	11	1	1	2	2	0	0	0	0
David Jensen	C	5	1	0	1	0	1	0	0	0
Daryl Evans	LW	6	0	1	1	0	-1	0	0	0
Al Jensen	G	44	0	1	1	4	0	0	0	0
Grant Martin	LW	11	0	1	1	6	-5	0	0	0
Yves Beaudoin	D	4	0	0	0	0	-4	0	0	0
Yvon Corriveau	LW	2	0	0	0	0	-1	0	0	0
Ed Kastelic	W	15	0	0	0	73	0	0	0	0
Bob Mason	G	1	0	0	0	0	0	0	0	0
Pete Peeters	G	34	0	0	0	8	0	0	0	0
Pat Riggin	G	7	0	0	0	2	0	0	0	0

Goaltending

Player	MIN	GP	W	L	T	GA	GAA	SO	SA	SV	SV%
Al Jensen	2437	44	28	9	3	129	3.18	2	1168	1039	.890
Pete Peeters	2021	34	19	11	3	113	3.35	1	910	797	.876
Pat Riggin	369	7	2	3	1	23	3.74	0	133	110	.827
Bob Mason	16	1	1	0	0	0	0.00	0	5	5	1.000
Team:	4843	80	50	23	7	265	3.28	3	2216	1951	.880

=== Playoffs ===
Scoring

Player	Pos	GP	G	A	Pts	PIM	PPG	SHG	GWG
Mike Gartner	RW	9	2	10	12	4	0	0	0
Scott Stevens	D	9	3	8	11	12	2	0	2
Alan Haworth	C	9	4	6	10	11	1	0	0
Bobby Carpenter	C	9	5	4	9	12	2	0	1
Dave Christian	RW	9	4	4	8	0	1	0	0
Gaetan Duchesne	LW	9	4	3	7	12	0	1	0
Bobby Gould	RW	9	4	3	7	11	0	0	0
Larry Murphy	D	9	1	5	6	6	1	0	0
Greg Adams	LW	9	1	3	4	27	0	0	0
John Barrett	D	9	2	1	3	35	0	0	1
Greg Smith	D	9	2	1	3	9	0	1	0
Rod Langway	D	9	1	2	3	6	1	0	0
Craig Laughlin	RW	9	1	2	3	10	0	0	1
Jorgen Pettersson	LW	8	1	2	3	2	1	0	0
Yvon Corriveau	LW	4	0	3	3	2	0	0	0
Kevin Hatcher	D	9	1	1	2	19	0	0	0
Stephen Leach	RW	6	0	1	1	0	0	0	0
Lou Franceschetti	RW	8	0	0	0	15	0	0	0
David Jensen	C	4	0	0	0	0	0	0	0
Pete Peeters	G	9	0	0	0	2	0	0	0
Dwight Schofield	D	3	0	0	0	14	0	0	0
Mark Taylor	C	3	0	0	0	0	0	0	0

Goaltending

Player	MIN	GP	W	L	GA	GAA	SO	SA	SV	SV%
Pete Peeters	544	9	5	4	24	2.65	0	253	229	.905
Team:	544	9	5	4	24	2.65	0	253	229	.905

Note: GP = Games played; G = Goals; A = Assists; Pts = Points; +/- = Plus/minus; PIM = Penalty minutes; PPG=Power-play goals; SHG=Short-handed goals; GWG=Game-winning goals
MIN=Minutes played; W = Wins; L = Losses; T = Ties; GA = Goals against; GAA = Goals against average; SO = Shutouts; SA=Shots against; SV=Shots saved; SV% = Save percentage;

== Awards and records ==
- The 107 points scored by the Washington Capitals in this season would not be surpassed until the 2008–09 Washington Capitals season, when the team scored 108 points in the regular season.
- Alan Haworth scored a goal in nine consecutive games, setting Washington record.

== Draft picks ==
Washington's draft picks at the 1985 NHL entry draft held at the Metro Toronto Convention Centre in Toronto, Ontario.

Round	#	Player	Nationality	College/Junior/Club team (League)
1	19	Yvon Corriveau	Canada	Toronto Marlboros (OHL)
2	40	John Druce	Canada	Peterborough Petes (OHL)
3	61	Rob Murray	Canada	Peterborough Petes (OHL)
4	82	Bill Houlder	Canada	North Bay Centennials (OHL)
4	83	Larry Shaw	Canada	Peterborough Petes (OHL)
5	103	Claude Dumas	Canada	Granby Bisons (QMJHL)
6	124	Doug Stromback	Canada	Kitchener Rangers (OHL)
7	145	Jamie Nadjiwan	Canada	Sudbury Wolves (OHL)
8	166	Mark Haarmann	Canada	Oshawa Generals (OHL)
9	187	Steve Hollett	Canada	Sault Ste. Marie Greyhounds (OHL)
10	208	Dallas Eakins	Canada	Peterborough Petes (OHL)
11	229	Steve Hrynewich	Canada	Ottawa 67's (OHL)
12	250	Frank Di Muzio	Canada	Belleville Bulls (OHL)

== See also ==
- 1985–86 NHL season
