= Jim Dobson (ice hockey) =

Canadian ice hockey player

- Born: February 29, 1960 (age 66) Winnipeg, Manitoba, Canada
- Height: 6 ft 1 in (185 cm)
- Weight: 195 lb (88 kg; 13 st 13 lb)
- Position: Right Wing
- Shot: Right
- Played for: Minnesota North Stars; Colorado Rockies; Quebec Nordiques
- NHL draft: 90th overall, 1979; Minnesota North Stars
- Playing career: 1980–1986

James Herold Dobson (born February 29, 1960) is a Canadian former professional ice hockey player and coach. He played in 12 National Hockey League (NHL) games as a forward with the Minnesota North Stars, Colorado Rockies, and Quebec Nordiques.

== Career ==
Dobson was drafted 90th overall by the Minnesota North Stars in 1979 after scoring 38 goals for the Portland Winter Hawks of the Western Hockey League (WHL). He returned to junior and scored 66 goals in 1979–80 and was named to the WHL first all-star team before spending his first pro season with the Oklahoma City Stars of the Central Hockey League (CHL). Over this time he was recalled for a few games in Minnesota but did not fit into the team's long-term plans.

Dobson played a handful of games for the Colorado Rockies in 1981–82 and dressed for one contest with the Quebec Nordiques two years later. His best performance was a 36-goal effort for the Birmingham South Stars of the CHL in the 1982–83 season. Dobson retired in 1986 after playing 29 games for the New Haven Nighthawks of the American Hockey League.

After his playing career, Dobson coached the Seattle Thunderbirds of the WHL during the 1987–88 season.

== Career statistics ==
=== Regular season and playoffs ===
			Regular season					Playoffs
Season	Team	League	GP	G	A	Pts	PIM	GP	G	A	Pts	PIM
1977–78	West Kelowna Warriors	BCJHL	60	42	51	93	119	—	—	—	—	—
1977–78	New Westminster Bruins	WCHL	12	4	2	6	121	11	5	3	8	2
1977–78	New Westminster Bruins	M-Cup	—	—	—	—	—	5	0	1	1	4
1978–79	Portland Winterhawks	WHL	71	38	39	77	143	25	17	6	23	56
1979–80	Portland Winterhawks	WHL	72	66	68	134	181	8	3	4	7	44
1979–80	Minnesota North Stars	NHL	1	0	0	0	0	—	—	—	—	—
1980–81	Oklahoma City Stars	CHL	35	23	16	39	46	—	—	—	—	—
1980–81	Minnesota North Stars	NHL	1	0	0	0	0	—	—	—	—	—
1981–82	Nashville South Stars	CHL	29	19	13	32	29	—	—	—	—	—
1981–82	Fort Worth Texans	CHL	34	15	12	27	65	—	—	—	—	—
1981–82	Minnesota North Stars	NHL	6	0	0	0	4	—	—	—	—	—
1981–82	Colorado Rockies	NHL	3	0	0	0	2	—	—	—	—	—
1982–83	Birmingham South Stars	CHL	80	36	37	73	100	13	8	4	12	4
1983–84	Fredericton Express	AHL	75	33	44	77	74	7	3	2	5	2
1983–84	Quebec Nordiques	NHL	1	0	0	0	0	—	—	—	—	—
1984–85	Fredericton Express	AHL	21	8	10	18	52	5	3	0	3	5
1985–86	New Haven Nighthawks	AHL	29	5	6	11	12	1	0	0	0	0
NHL totals			12	0	0	0	6	—	—	—	—	—

== Awards ==
- WHL First All-Star Team – 1980
