= 1985–86 NHL season =

National Hockey League season

- League: National Hockey League
- Sport: Ice hockey
- Duration: October 10, 1985 – May 24, 1986
- Games: 80
- Teams: 21
- TV partner(s): CBC, CTV, TSN, (Note: TSN only televised the All-Star Game.) SRC (Canada); ESPN (United States)

Draft
- Top draft pick: Wendel Clark
- Picked by: Toronto Maple Leafs

Regular season
- Presidents' Trophy: Edmonton Oilers
- Season MVP: Wayne Gretzky (Oilers)
- Top scorer: Wayne Gretzky (Oilers)

Playoffs
- Playoffs MVP: Patrick Roy (Canadiens)

Stanley Cup
- Champions: Montreal Canadiens
- Runners-up: Calgary Flames

NHL seasons
- 1984–85 1986–87

The 1985–86 NHL season was the 69th season of the National Hockey League. This season saw the league's Board of Governors introduce the Presidents' Trophy, which would go to the team with the best overall record in the NHL regular season. The Edmonton Oilers would be the first winners of this award.

The Montreal Canadiens defeated the Calgary Flames four games to one in the final series to win the Stanley Cup.

== League business ==
=== Entry draft ===
The 1985 NHL entry draft was held on June 15, at the Metro Toronto Convention Centre in Toronto, Ontario. This was the first draft held outside of Montreal, Quebec. Wendel Clark was selected first overall by the Toronto Maple Leafs.

=== Rule changes ===
On June 13, 1985, the NHL board of governors voted 17–4 in favour of amending a penalty rule. Previously, coincidental minor penalties would result in 4-on-4 play. The amendment allowed teams to substitute another player to keep the play 5-on-5. It was seen by many as a shot at trying to slow down the high-flying Edmonton Oilers. Wayne Gretzky was quoted as saying, "I think the NHL is making a big mistake. I think the NHL should be more concerned with butt-ending, spearing, and three-hour hockey games than getting rid of 4-on-4 situations." It wasn't until 1992, with the Oiler dynasty (five cups in seven years) having ended, that the NHL reverted to the original 4-on-4 rules.

== Regular season ==
The Edmonton Oilers once again regained control of top spot in the NHL and were awarded with the Presidents' Trophy—the first time the trophy had been awarded for the best record—while last year's best team, the Philadelphia Flyers slipped to second. The Flyers continued their dominance of the Wales Conference despite the death of their Vezina-winning goaltender, Pelle Lindbergh, in a car accident on November 11. Edmonton's Wayne Gretzky won his seventh straight Hart Memorial Trophy and his sixth straight Art Ross Trophy. This season saw Gretzky score 52 goals, and set records of 163 assists and 215 points. This was the fourth time in five years that Gretzky reached the 200 point plateau; no other player has reached 200 point mark, although Mario Lemieux would garner 199 points in 76 games in 1988–89. Edmonton's defenceman Paul Coffey broke Bobby Orr's record of 46 goals for most goals in a season by a defenceman by scoring 48 times.

=== Final standings ===
Note: GP = Games Played, W = Wins, L = Losses, T = Ties, GF= Goals For, GA = Goals Against, Pts = Points, PIM = Penalty Minutes

==== Prince of Wales Conference ====
Adams Division
	GP	W	L	T	GF	GA	Pts
Quebec Nordiques	80	43	31	6	330	289	92
Montreal Canadiens	80	40	33	7	330	280	87
Boston Bruins	80	37	31	12	311	288	86
Hartford Whalers	80	40	36	4	332	302	84
Buffalo Sabres	80	37	37	6	296	291	80

Patrick Division
	GP	W	L	T	GF	GA	Pts
Philadelphia Flyers	80	53	23	4	335	241	110
Washington Capitals	80	50	23	7	315	272	107
New York Islanders	80	39	29	12	327	284	90
New York Rangers	80	36	38	6	280	276	78
Pittsburgh Penguins	80	34	38	8	313	305	76
New Jersey Devils	80	28	49	3	300	374	59

==== Clarence Campbell Conference ====
Norris Division
	GP	W	L	T	GF	GA	Pts
Chicago Black Hawks	80	39	33	8	351	349	86
Minnesota North Stars	80	38	33	9	327	305	85
St. Louis Blues	80	37	34	9	302	291	83
Toronto Maple Leafs	80	25	48	7	311	386	57
Detroit Red Wings	80	17	57	6	266	415	40

Smythe Division
	GP	W	L	T	GF	GA	Pts
Edmonton Oilers	80	56	17	7	426	310	119
Calgary Flames	80	40	31	9	354	315	89
Winnipeg Jets	80	26	47	7	295	372	59
Vancouver Canucks	80	23	44	13	282	333	59
Los Angeles Kings	80	23	49	8	284	389	54

== Playoffs ==
=== Bracket ===
The top four teams in each division qualified for the playoffs. In the division semifinals, the fourth seeded team in each division played against the division winner from their division. The other series matched the second and third place teams from the divisions. The two winning teams from each division's semifinals then met in the division finals. The two division winners of each conference then played in the conference finals. The two conference winners then advanced to the Stanley Cup Final.

In the division semifinals, teams competed in a best-of-five series. In the other three rounds, teams competed in a best-of-seven series (scores in the bracket indicate the number of games won in each series).

Division semifinals	Division finals
A1	Quebec	0
A4	Hartford	3
A4	Hartford	3
A2	Montreal	4
A2	Montreal	3
A3	Boston	0
Prince of Wales Conference
P1	Philadelphia	2
P4	NY Rangers	3
P4	NY Rangers	4
P2	Washington	2
P2	Washington	3
P3	NY Islanders	0
N1	Chicago	0
N4	Toronto	3
N4	Toronto	3
N3	St. Louis	4
N2	Minnesota	2
N3	St. Louis	3
Clarence Campbell Conference
S1	Edmonton	3
S4	Vancouver	0
S1	Edmonton	3
S2	Calgary	4
S2	Calgary	3
S3	Winnipeg	0

Conference finals
A2	Montreal	4
P4	NY Rangers	1
N3	St. Louis	3
S2	Calgary	4

Stanley Cup Final
A2	Montreal	4
S2	Calgary	1

== Awards ==
1986 NHL awards
Presidents' Trophy: Team with most points, regular season	Edmonton Oilers
Prince of Wales Trophy: (Wales Conference playoff champion)	Montreal Canadiens
Clarence S. Campbell Bowl: (Campbell Conference playoff champion)	Calgary Flames
Art Ross Trophy: (Top scorer, regular season)	Wayne Gretzky, Edmonton Oilers
Bill Masterton Memorial Trophy: (Perseverance, sportsmanship, and dedication)	Charlie Simmer, Boston Bruins
Calder Memorial Trophy: (Best first-year player)	Gary Suter, Calgary Flames
Conn Smythe Trophy: (Most valuable player, playoffs)	Patrick Roy, Montreal Canadiens
Frank J. Selke Trophy: (Best defensive forward)	Troy Murray, Chicago Black Hawks
Hart Memorial Trophy: (Most valuable player, regular season)	Wayne Gretzky, Edmonton Oilers
Jack Adams Award: (Best coach)	Glen Sather, Edmonton Oilers
James Norris Memorial Trophy: (Best defenceman)	Paul Coffey, Edmonton Oilers
Lady Byng Memorial Trophy: (Excellence and sportsmanship)	Mike Bossy, New York Islanders
Lester B. Pearson Award: (Outstanding player, regular season)	Mario Lemieux, Pittsburgh Penguins
NHL Plus/Minus Award: (Player with best plus/minus record)	Mark Howe, Philadelphia Flyers
William M. Jennings Trophy: (Goaltender(s) of team(s) with best goaltending record)	Bob Froese/Darren Jensen, Philadelphia Flyers
Vezina Trophy: (Best goaltender)	John Vanbiesbrouck, New York Rangers

=== All-Star teams ===
First Team	Position	Second Team
John Vanbiesbrouck, New York Rangers	G	Bob Froese, Philadelphia Flyers
Paul Coffey, Edmonton Oilers	D	Larry Robinson, Montreal Canadiens
Mark Howe, Philadelphia Flyers	D	Ray Bourque, Boston Bruins
Wayne Gretzky, Edmonton Oilers	C	Mario Lemieux, Pittsburgh Penguins
Mike Bossy, New York Islanders	RW	Jari Kurri, Edmonton Oilers
Michel Goulet, Quebec Nordiques	LW	Mats Naslund, Montreal Canadiens

== Player statistics ==
=== Scoring leaders ===
Player	Team	GP	G	A	Pts
Wayne Gretzky	Edmonton Oilers	80	52	163	215
Mario Lemieux	Pittsburgh Penguins	79	48	93	141
Paul Coffey	Edmonton Oilers	79	48	90	138
Jari Kurri	Edmonton Oilers	78	68	63	131
Mike Bossy	New York Islanders	80	61	62	123
Peter Stastny	Quebec Nordiques	76	41	81	122
Denis Savard	Chicago Black Hawks	80	47	69	116
Mats Naslund	Montreal Canadiens	80	43	67	110
Dale Hawerchuk	Winnipeg Jets	80	46	59	105
Neal Broten	Minnesota North Stars	80	29	76	105

Source: NHL

=== Leading goaltenders ===
Player	Team	GP	MIN	GA	SO	GAA	SV%
Bob Froese	Philadelphia Flyers	51	2728	116	5	2.55	.909
Al Jensen	Washington Capitals	44	2437	129	2	3.18	.890
Clint Malarchuk	Quebec Nordiques	46	2657	142	4	3.21	.895
Kelly Hrudey	New York Islanders	45	2563	137	1	3.21	.906
John Vanbiesbrouck	New York Rangers	61	3326	184	3	3.32	.887
Patrick Roy	Montreal Canadiens	47	2651	148	1	3.35	.875
Pat Riggin	Washington Capitals / Boston Bruins	46	2641	150	1	3.41	.827
Rick Wamsley	St. Louis Blues	42	2517	144	1	3.43	.894
Pete Peeters	Boston Bruins / Washington Capitals	42	2506	144	1	3.45	.875
Don Beaupre	Minnesota North Stars	52	3073	182	1	3.55	.892

Source: NHL

== Coaches ==
=== Patrick Division ===
- New Jersey Devils: Doug Carpenter
- New York Islanders: Al Arbour
- New York Rangers: Ted Sator
- Philadelphia Flyers: Mike Keenan
- Pittsburgh Penguins: Bob Berry
- Washington Capitals: Bryan Murray

=== Adams Division ===
- Boston Bruins: Butch Goring
- Buffalo Sabres: Jim Schoenfeld and Scotty Bowman
- Hartford Whalers: Jack Evans
- Montreal Canadiens: Jean Perron
- Quebec Nordiques: Michel Bergeron

=== Norris Division ===
- Chicago Black Hawks: Bob Pulford
- Detroit Red Wings: Harry Neale and Brad Park
- Minnesota North Stars: Lorne Henning
- St. Louis Blues: Jacques Demers
- Toronto Maple Leafs: Dan Maloney

=== Smythe Division ===
- Calgary Flames: Bob Johnson
- Edmonton Oilers: Glen Sather
- Los Angeles Kings: Pat Quinn
- Vancouver Canucks: Tom Watt
- Winnipeg Jets: Barry Long and John Ferguson Sr.

== Milestones ==
=== Debuts ===
The following is a list of players of note who played their first NHL game in 1985–86 (listed with their first team, asterisk(*) marks debut in playoffs):

- Bill Ranford, Boston Bruins
- Daren Puppa, Buffalo Sabres
- Brian Bradley, Calgary Flames
- Gary Suter, Calgary Flames
- Brett Hull*, Calgary Flames
- Adam Oates, Detroit Red Wings
- Petr Klima, Detroit Red Wings
- Bob Probert, Detroit Red Wings
- Shayne Corson, Montreal Canadiens
- Kirk McLean, New Jersey Devils
- Craig Wolanin, New Jersey Devils
- Scott Mellanby, Philadelphia Flyers
- Craig Simpson, Pittsburgh Penguins
- Jeff Brown, Quebec Nordiques
- Cliff Ronning*, St. Louis Blues
- Wendel Clark, Toronto Maple Leafs
- Dave Lowry, Vancouver Canucks
- Jim Sandlak, Vancouver Canucks

=== Last games ===
The following is a list of players of note that played their last game in the NHL in 1985–86 (listed with their last team):

- Tom Lysiak, Chicago Black Hawks
- Mike Rogers, Edmonton Oilers
- Mario Tremblay, Montreal Canadiens
- Bob Nystrom, New York Islanders
- Pelle Lindbergh, Philadelphia Flyers
- Denis Herron, Pittsburgh Penguins
- Don Edwards, Toronto Maple Leafs
- Marian Stastny, Toronto Maple Leafs
- Jiri Bubla, Vancouver Canucks
- Dan Bouchard, Winnipeg Jets

== Broadcasting ==
This was the second and final season that the Canadian national broadcast rights were split between the Molson-sponsored Hockey Night in Canada on CBC, and the Carling O'Keefe-sponsored telecasts on CTV. HNIC aired on Saturday nights, while CTV primarily televised Friday night games. CTV was also supposed to televise the All-Star Game, but due to a prior programming commitment, the game aired instead on the cable network TSN for the first time. CBC and CTV also split the Stanley Cup playoffs. After the season, CTV decided to pull the plug on the venture, citing its limited access to Canadian-based teams, which translated into poor ratings. Carling O'Keefe retained the rights for the next two seasons, and syndicated its playoff telecasts to a chain of local stations that would one day become the Global Television Network.

This was the first season of the league's three-year U.S. national broadcast rights deal with ESPN. The contract called for the network to air up to 33 regular season games each season as well as the All-Star Game and the playoffs.

== See also ==
- List of Stanley Cup champions
- 1985 NHL entry draft
- 1985–86 NHL transactions
- 38th National Hockey League All-Star Game
- National Hockey League All-Star Game
- NHL All-Rookie Team
- 1985 in sports
- 1986 in sports
