= Tony Feltrin =

Canadian ice hockey defenceman

- Born: December 6, 1961 (age 64) Ladysmith, British Columbia, Canada
- Height: 6 ft 1 in (185 cm)
- Weight: 195 lb (88 kg; 13 st 13 lb)
- Position: Defence
- Shot: Left
- Played for: New York Rangers; Pittsburgh Penguins
- NHL draft: 72nd overall, 1980; Pittsburgh Penguins
- Playing career: 1977–1986

Anthony Louis Feltrin (born December 6, 1961) is a Canadian former professional ice hockey defenceman. He played in the National Hockey League for the Pittsburgh Penguins and New York Rangers.

After his retirement, Feltrin works as a scout for the St. Louis Blues.

== Personal life ==
After Feltrin married his wife Kelly they moved to Cowichan Lake. In June 2018 he was inducted into the Cowichan Lake Heritage Sports Wall of Fame.

== Career statistics ==
			Regular Season					Playoffs
Season	Team	League	GP	G	A	Pts	PIM	GP	G	A	Pts	PIM
1977–78	Nanaimo Clippers	BCJHL	—	2	13	15	0	—	—	—	—	—
1978–79	Victoria Cougars	WHL	47	2	11	13	119	7	0	1	1	4
1979–80	Victoria Cougars	WHL	71	6	25	31	138	17	0	8	8	21
1980–81	Victoria Cougars	WHL	43	4	25	29	81	15	2	10	12	47
1980–81	Pittsburgh Penguins	NHL	2	0	0	0	0	—	—	—	—	—
1981–82	Pittsburgh Penguins	NHL	4	0	0	0	4	—	—	—	—	—
1981–82	Erie Blades	AHL	72	4	15	19	117	—	—	—	—	—
1982–83	Baltimore Skipjacks	AHL	31	2	3	5	34	—	—	—	—	—
1982–83	Pittsburgh Penguins	NHL	32	3	3	6	40	—	—	—	—	—
1983–84	Baltimore Skipjacks	AHL	4	0	0	0	2	—	—	—	—	—
1983–84	Salt Lake Golden Eagles	CHL	65	8	22	30	94	5	2	0	2	5
1984–85	Salt Lake Golden Eagles	IHL	81	8	19	27	125	7	2	1	3	14
1985–86	New Haven Nighthawks	AHL	22	0	2	2	38	—	—	—	—	—
1985–86	New York Rangers	NHL	10	0	0	0	21	—	—	—	—	—
NHL totals			48	3	3	6	65	—	—	—	—	—
