= 1985–86 New York Rangers season =

NHL hockey team season

1985–86 New York Rangers
- Division: 4th Patrick
- Conference: Wales
- 1985–86 record: 34–38–8
- Home record: 20–18–2
- Road record: 16–20–4
- Goals for: 280
- Goals against: 276

Team information
- General manager: Craig Patrick
- Coach: Ted Sator
- Captain: Barry Beck
- Alternate captains: Ron Greschner; Tom Laidlaw
- Arena: Madison Square Garden

Team leaders
- Goals: Tomas Sandström (25)
- Assists: Mike Ridley (43)
- Points: Mike Ridley (65)
- Penalty minutes: Bob Brooke (111)
- Wins: John Vanbiesbrouck (31)
- Goals against average: John Vanbiesbrouck (3.32)

The 1985–86 New York Rangers season was the franchise's 60th season. The highlight of the season was participating in the Prince of Wales Conference Finals.

== Regular season ==
=== Final standings ===
Patrick Division
	GP	W	L	T	GF	GA	Pts
**Philadelphia Flyers**	80	53	23	4	335	241	110
**Washington Capitals**	80	50	23	7	315	272	107
**New York Islanders**	80	39	29	12	327	284	90
**New York Rangers**	80	36	38	6	280	276	78
Pittsburgh Penguins	80	34	38	8	313	305	76
New Jersey Devils	80	28	49	3	300	374	59

Note: GP = Games played, W = Wins, L = Losses, T = Ties, Pts = Points, GF = Goals for, GA = Goals against
Note: Teams that qualified for the playoffs are highlighted in bold.

=== Record vs. opponents ===
Patrick Division record vs. opponents

==== Vs. Wales Conference ====
**Vs. Patrick Division**

1985–86 NHL records
Team	**NJD**	**NYI**	**NYR**	**PHI**	**PIT**	**WSH**	**Total**
New Jersey	—	2−5	2−5	3−4	2−4−1	1−6	10−24−1
N.Y. Islanders	5−2	—	3−3−1	4−3	5−1−1	3−4	20−13−2
N.Y. Rangers	5−2	3−3−1	—	1−6	2−4−1	3−3−1	14−18−3
Philadelphia	4−3	3−4	6−1	—	6−0−1	5−2	24−10−1
Pittsburgh	4−2−1	1−5−1	4−2−1	0–6−1	—	1−6	10−21−4
Washington	6−1	4−3	3−3−1	2–5	6−1	—	21−13−1

**Vs. Adams Division**

1985–86 NHL records
Team	**BOS**	**BUF**	**HFD**	**MTL**	**QUE**	**Total**
New Jersey	0−3	1−2	1−2	1−2	2−1	5−10−0
N.Y. Islanders	1−0−2	1−2	2−1	1−2	1−2	6−7−2
N.Y. Rangers	2−1	0−3	1−2	2−0−1	0−2−1	5−8−2
Philadelphia	2−1	1−2	3−0	2−1	1−1−1	9−5−1
Pittsburgh	1−2	2−0−1	1−2	0−2−1	1−1−1	5−7−3
Washington	2−0−1	1−1−1	2−0−1	2−0−1	3−0	10−1−4

==== Vs. Campbell Conference ====
**Vs. Norris Division**

1985–86 NHL records
Team	**CHI**	**DET**	**MIN**	**STL**	**TOR**	**Total**
New Jersey	2−1	2−0−1	1−2	1−2	1−2	7−7−1
N.Y. Islanders	0−2−1	3−0	0−2−1	1−1−1	3−0	7−5−3
N.Y. Rangers	0−3	3−0	1−2	1−1−1	2−1	7−7−1
Philadelphia	2−0−1	2−1	2−0−1	2−1	2−1	10−3−2
Pittsburgh	1−1−1	2−1	3−0	2−1	3−0	11−3−1
Washington	2−1	2−1	2−1	3−0	2−1	11−4−0

**Vs. Smythe Division**

1985–86 NHL records
Team	**CGY**	**EDM**	**LAK**	**VAN**	**WIN**	**Total**
New Jersey	0−2−1	0−3	2−1	2−1	2−1	6−8−1
N.Y. Islanders	1−1−1	0−1−2	2−1	1−1−1	2−0−1	6−4−5
N.Y. Rangers	1−2	2−1	2−1	3−0	2−1	10−5−0
Philadelphia	2−1	1−2	3−0	2−1	2−1	10−5−0
Pittsburgh	1−2	1−2	2−1	2−1	2−1	8−7−0
Washington	0−3	3−0	2−1	2−0−1	1−1−1	8−5−2

== Schedule and results ==
1985–86 regular season
October: 5–4–0 (home: 5–1–0; road: 0–3–0)

Game	October	Opponent	Score	Record
1	10	Washington Capitals	4 – 2	1–0–0
2	12	@ Hartford Whalers	8 – 2	1–1–0
3	13	New Jersey Devils	3 – 2 OT	1–2–0
4	16	@ Los Angeles Kings	4 – 3	1–3–0
5	19	@ New York Islanders	5 – 4	1–4–0
6	20	Vancouver Canucks	4 – 3	2–4–0
7	23	New Jersey Devils	5 – 1	3–4–0
8	25	Los Angeles Kings	5 – 0	4–4–0
9	27	Boston Bruins	2 – 1	5–4–0

November: 6–8–1 (home: 2–5–0; road: 4–3–1)

Game	November	Opponent	Score	Record
10	2	@ New Jersey Devils	6 – 5 OT	5–5–0
11	4	@ Pittsburgh Penguins	4 – 2	6–5–0
12	6	Philadelphia Flyers	5 – 2	6–6–0
13	8	@ Winnipeg Jets	7 – 3	7–6–0
14	9	@ Minnesota North Stars	4 – 3 OT	7–7–0
15	11	Chicago Black Hawks	5 – 4 OT	7–8–0
16	13	Montreal Canadiens	5 – 2	8–8–0
17	16	@ Montreal Canadiens	2 – 2 OT	8–8–1
18	17	Edmonton Oilers	3 – 2 OT	8–9–1
19	20	Toronto Maple Leafs	7 – 3	9–9–1
20	23	@ New York Islanders	5 – 0	10–9–1
21	24	New York Islanders	4 – 3 OT	10–10–1
22	27	Calgary Flames	5 – 2	10–11–1
23	29	@ Washington Capitals	5 – 2	11–11–1
24	30	@ Pittsburgh Penguins	5 – 4	11–12–1

December: 6–7–1 (home: 4–3–1; road: 2–4–0)

Game	December	Opponent	Score	Record
25	2	Pittsburgh Penguins	6 – 0	11–13–1
26	4	Winnipeg Jets	7 – 4	12–13–1
27	7	@ Philadelphia Flyers	4 – 0	12–14–1
28	8	Philadelphia Flyers	3 – 1	13–14–1
29	11	@ New Jersey Devils	4 – 2	14–14–1
30	14	@ Boston Bruins	4 – 2	14–15–1
31	15	Pittsburgh Penguins	5 – 2	14–16–1
32	18	Buffalo Sabres	5 – 4	14–17–1
33	20	New York Islanders	2 – 2 OT	14–17–2
34	21	@ New York Islanders	5 – 4	15–17–2
35	23	Detroit Red Wings	10 – 2	16–17–2
36	26	@ Buffalo Sabres	6 – 1	16–18–2
37	28	@ Minnesota North Stars	3 – 1	16–19–2
38	29	Washington Capitals	6 – 5	17–19–2

January: 5–6–2 (home: 1–3–1; road: 4–3–1)

Game	January	Opponent	Score	Record
39	1	@ Washington Capitals	3 – 0	17–20–2
40	5	Quebec Nordiques	5 – 4	17–21–2
41	10	Montreal Canadiens	6 – 4	18–21–2
42	12	St. Louis Blues	2 – 2 OT	18–21–3
43	14	@ Vancouver Canucks	2 – 1	19–21–3
44	15	@ Los Angeles Kings	4 – 3	20–21–3
45	18	@ Edmonton Oilers	5 – 4	21–21–3
46	20	Hartford Whalers	5 – 0	21–22–3
47	22	@ Toronto Maple Leafs	4 – 2	22–22–3
48	23	Quebec Nordiques	4 – 0	22–23–3
49	27	@ Quebec Nordiques	6 – 6 OT	22–23–4
50	29	@ Chicago Black Hawks	5 – 4	22–24–4
51	31	@ Buffalo Sabres	5 – 3	22–25–4

February: 8–2–0 (home: 5–0–0; road: 3–2–0)

Game	February	Opponent	Score	Record
52	1	@ Hartford Whalers	3 – 1	23–25–4
53	5	@ St. Louis Blues	4 – 3	23–26–4
54	8	@ Boston Bruins	3 – 2	24–26–4
55	12	Vancouver Canucks	5 – 2	25–26–4
56	14	@ Detroit Red Wings	7 – 5	26–26–4
57	16	Detroit Red Wings	3 – 1	27–26–4
58	20	St. Louis Blues	3 – 2	28–26–4
59	24	Minnesota North Stars	5 – 1	29–26–4
60	25	@ Toronto Maple Leafs	7 – 3	29–27–4
61	27	Pittsburgh Penguins	8 – 3	30–27–4

March: 6–9–1 (home: 3–4–0; road: 3–5–1)

Game	March	Opponent	Score	Record
62	1	@ Washington Capitals	4 – 0	30–28–4
63	2	Washington Capitals	4 – 2	30–29–4
64	5	@ Winnipeg Jets	4 – 1	30–30–4
65	6	@ Calgary Flames	5 – 2	31–30–4
66	9	Philadelphia Flyers	4 – 1	31–31–4
67	11	@ New Jersey Devils	6 – 3	32–31–4
68	12	Calgary Flames	3 – 2	32–32–4
69	15	@ Pittsburgh Penguins	2 – 2 OT	32–32–5
70	16	New York Islanders	3 – 1	33–32–5
71	18	@ New York Islanders	6 – 2	33–33–5
72	22	@ Philadelphia Flyers	4 – 2	33–34–5
73	23	Chicago Black Hawks	5 – 3	33–35–5
74	25	@ New Jersey Devils	5 – 4	34–35–5
75	28	Edmonton Oilers	4 – 2	35–35–5
76	29	@ Philadelphia Flyers	8 – 2	35–36–5
77	31	New Jersey Devils	9 – 0	36–36–5

April: 0–2–1 (home: 0–2–0; road: 0–0–1)

Game	April	Opponent	Score	Record
78	2	Philadelphia Flyers	3 – 2	36–37–5
79	5	@ Washington Capitals	4 – 4 OT	36–37–6
80	6	Pittsburgh Penguins	5 – 4 OT	36–38–6

Legend: Win (2 points) Loss (0 points) Tie (1 point)

== Playoffs ==
1986 Stanley Cup playoffs
Division semifinals vs. (P1) Philadelphia Flyers – Rangers win 3–2

Game	Date	Visitor	Score	Home	OT	Series
1	April 9	New York Rangers	6 – 2	Philadelphia Flyers		New York Rangers lead series 1-0
2	April 10	New York Rangers	1 – 2	Philadelphia Flyers		Series tied 1-1
3	April 12	Philadelphia Flyers	2 – 5	New York Rangers		New York Rangers lead series 2-1
4	April 13	Philadelphia Flyers	7 – 1	New York Rangers		Series tied 2-2
5	April 15	New York Rangers	5 – 2	Philadelphia Flyers		New York Rangers win series 3-2

Division Finals vs. (P2) Washington Capitals – Rangers win 4–2

Game	Date	Visitor	Score	Home	OT	Series
1	April 17	New York Rangers	4 – 3	Washington Capitals	OT	New York Rangers lead series 1-0
2	April 19	New York Rangers	1 – 8	Washington Capitals		Series tied 1-1
3	April 21	Washington Capitals	6 – 3	New York Rangers		Washington leads series 2-1
4	April 23	Washington Capitals	5 – 6	New York Rangers	OT	Series tied 2-2
5	April 25	New York Rangers	4 – 2	Washington Capitals		New York Rangers lead series 3-2
6	April 27	Washington Capitals	1 – 2	New York Rangers		New York Rangers win series 4-2

Conference Finals vs. (A2) Montreal Canadiens – Montreal wins 4–1

Game	Date	Visitor	Score	Home	OT	Series
1	May 1	New York Rangers	1 – 2	Montreal Canadiens		Montreal leads series 1-0
2	May 3	New York Rangers	2 – 6	Montreal Canadiens		Montreal leads series 2-0
3	May 5	Montreal Canadiens	4 – 3	New York Rangers	OT	Montreal leads series 3-0
4	May 7	Montreal Canadiens	0 – 2	New York Rangers		Montreal leads series 3-1
5	May 9	New York Rangers	1 – 3	Montreal Canadiens		Montreal wins series 4-1

Legend: Win Loss

== Player statistics ==
Skaters

Regular season
Player	GP	G	A	Pts	+/-	PIM
Mike Ridley	80	22	43	65	0	69
Reijo Ruotsalainen	80	17	42	59	22	47
Tomas Sandstrom	73	25	29	54	-4	109
Ron Greschner	78	20	28	48	9	104
Bob Brooke	79	24	20	44	6	111
James Patrick	75	14	29	43	14	88
Mark Pavelich	59	20	20	40	-3	82
Mark Osborne	62	16	24	40	5	80
Raimo Helminen	66	10	30	40	-1	10
Kelly Miller	74	13	20	33	3	52
Brian MacLellan^{†}	51	11	21	32	-20	47
Don Maloney	68	11	17	28	18	56
Pierre Larouche	28	20	7	27	-6	4
Peter Sundstrom	53	8	15	23	7	12
Jan Erixon	31	2	17	19	12	4
Tom Laidlaw	68	6	12	18	-3	103
Willie Huber	70	7	8	15	-11	85
Mike Allison	28	2	13	15	4	22
Barry Beck	25	4	8	12	7	24
Grant Ledyard^{‡}	27	2	9	11	-7	20
Dave Gagner	32	4	6	10	1	19
Larry Melnyk^{†}	46	1	8	9	2	65
George McPhee	30	4	4	8	5	63
Steve Patrick^{‡}	28	4	3	7	-7	37
Mike McEwen^{‡}	16	2	5	7	-4	8
Wilf Paiement^{†}	8	1	6	7	2	13
Rob Whistle	32	4	2	6	-1	10
Chris Jensen	9	1	3	4	1	0
Mike Rogers^{‡}	9	1	3	4	2	2
Jim Wiemer	7	3	0	3	0	2
Bob Crawford^{†}	11	1	2	3	2	10
Steve Richmond^{‡}	17	0	2	2	2	63
Randy Heath	1	0	1	1	1	0
Kjell Samuelsson	9	0	0	0	-1	10
Tony Feltrin	10	0	0	0	-3	21

Playoffs
Player	GP	G	A	Pts	PIM
Pierre Larouche	16	8	9	17	2
Bob Brooke	16	6	9	15	28
Mike Ridley	16	6	8	14	26
Wilf Paiement	16	5	5	10	45
Tomas Sandstrom	16	4	6	10	20
Reijo Ruotsalainen	16	0	8	8	6
Kelly Miller	16	3	4	7	4
Brian MacLellan	16	2	4	6	15
James Patrick	16	1	5	6	34
Willie Huber	16	3	2	5	16
Mark Osborne	15	2	3	5	26
Ron Greschner	5	3	1	4	11
Larry Melnyk	16	1	2	3	46
Don Maloney	16	2	1	3	31
Mike Allison	16	0	2	2	38
Tom Laidlaw	7	0	2	2	12
Kjell Samuelsson	9	0	1	1	8
Bob Crawford	7	0	1	1	8
Jim Wiemer	8	1	0	1	6
Jan Erixon	12	0	1	1	4
Rob Whistle	3	0	0	0	2
George McPhee	11	0	0	0	32
Peter Sundstrom	1	0	0	0	2
Raimo Helminen	2	0	0	0	0

Goaltenders

Regular season
Player	GP	TOI	W	L	T	GA	GAA	SA	SV%	SO
John Vanbiesbrouck	61	3326	31	21	5	184	3.32	1809	.887	3
Glen Hanlon	23	1170	5	12	1	65	3.33	673	.893	0
Terry Kleisinger	4	191	0	2	0	14	4.40	123	.872	0
Ron Scott	4	156	0	3	0	11	4.23	67	.804	0

Playoffs
Player	GP	TOI	W	L	GA	GAA	SA	SV%	SO
John Vanbiesbrouck	16	899	8	8	49	3.27	477	.897	1
Glen Hanlon	3	75	0	0	6	4.80	32	.813	0

^{†}Denotes player spent time with another team before joining Rangers. Stats reflect time with Rangers only.
^{‡}Traded mid-season. Stats reflect time with Rangers only.

Note:

Pos = Position;GP = Games played; G = Goals; A = Assists; Pts = Points; PIM = Penalty minutes; +/- = Plus/minus; PPG = Power-play goals; SHG = Short-handed goals; GWG = Game-winning goals
Pos = Position;GP = Games played; Min, TOI = Minutes played; W = Wins; L = Losses; T,T/OT = Ties; OTL = Overtime losses; GA = Goals-against; GAA = Goals-against average; SO = Shutouts; SA = Shots against; SV = Shots saved;SV% = Save percentage;

== Draft picks ==
New York's picks at the 1985 NHL entry draft in Toronto, Ontario, Canada at the Metro Toronto Convention Centre.

Round	#	Player	Position	Nationality	College/Junior/Club team (League)
1	7	Ulf Dahlén	RW	Sweden	Ostersund (Sweden)
2	28	Mike Richter	G	United States	Northwood School (New York)
3	49	Sam Lindstahl	G	Sweden	Södertälje SK (Allsvenskan)
4	70	Pat Janostin	D	Canada	Notre Dame H.S. (Sask.)
5	91	Brad Stepan	LW	Canada	St. Paul Suburban H.S. (Minnesota)
6	112	Brian McReynolds	C	Canada	Orillia Travelways (OHA-A)
7	133	Neil Pilon	D	Canada	Kamloops Blazers (WHL)
8	154	Larry Bernard	LW	Canada	Seattle Breakers (WHL)
9	175	Stephane Brochu	D	Canada	Quebec Remparts (QMJHL)
10	196	Steve Nemeth	RW	Canada	Lethbridge Broncos (WHL)
11	217	Robert Burakovsky	RW	Sweden	Leksands IF (Allsvenskan)
12	238	Rudy Poeschek	D	Canada	Kamloops Blazers (WHL)

== Awards and records ==
- John Vanbiesbrouck, Vezina Trophy
- John Vanbiesbrouck, goaltender, NHL first team All-Star
