= 1985–86 St. Louis Blues season =

National Hockey League team season

1985–86 St. Louis Blues
- Division: 3rd Norris
- Conference: 5th Campbell
- 1985–86 record: 37–34–9
- Home record: 23–11–6
- Road record: 14–23–3
- Goals for: 302
- Goals against: 291

Team information
- General manager: Ron Caron
- Coach: Jacques Demers
- Captain: Brian Sutter
- Alternate captains: Bernie Federko; Rob Ramage
- Arena: St. Louis Arena

Team leaders
- Goals: Mark Hunter (44)
- Assists: Bernie Federko (68)
- Points: Bernie Federko (102)
- Penalty minutes: Mark Hunter and Rob Ramage (171)
- Wins: Rick Wamsley (22)
- Goals against average: Rick Wamsley (3.43)

The 1985–86 St. Louis Blues season saw the Blues finish in third place in the Norris Division with a record of 37 wins, 34 losses, and 9 ties for 83 points. The Blues participated in the NHL playoffs, beating the Minnesota North Stars in the Norris Division Semi-finals, three games to two, followed by a 4–3 series win over the Toronto Maple Leafs to take the Norris Division playoff title. However, they lost to the Calgary Flames in the Campbell Conference Finals in seven games. The Blues won Game 6 of those Campbell Conference Finals in overtime, 6–5, a victory known to Blues fans as "The Monday Night Miracle".

== Regular season ==
=== Final standings ===
Norris Division
	GP	W	L	T	GF	GA	Pts
**Chicago Black Hawks**	80	39	33	8	351	349	86
**Minnesota North Stars**	80	38	33	9	327	305	85
**St. Louis Blues**	80	37	34	9	302	291	83
**Toronto Maple Leafs**	80	25	48	7	311	386	57
Detroit Red Wings	80	17	57	6	266	415	40

Note: GP = Games played, W = Wins, L = Losses, T = Ties, Pts = Points, GF = Goals for, GA = Goals against
Note: Teams that qualified for the playoffs are highlighted in bold.

=== Record vs. opponents ===
Norris Division record vs. opponents

==== Vs. Campbell Conference ====
**Vs. Norris Division**

1985–86 NHL records
Team	**CHI**	**DET**	**MIN**	**STL**	**TOR**	**Total**
Chicago	—	6−2	3−3−2	5−3	2−6	**16−14−2**
Detroit	2−6	—	1−6−1	2−5−1	3−4−1	**8−21−3**
Minnesota	3−3−2	6−1−1	—	4−3−1	7−0−1	**20−7−5**
St. Louis	3−5	5−2−1	3−4−1	—	3−3−2	**14−14−4**
Toronto	6−2	4−3−1	0−7−1	3−3−2	—	**13−15−4**

**Vs. Smythe Division**

1985–86 NHL records
Team	**CGY**	**EDM**	**LAK**	**VAN**	**WIN**	**Total**
Chicago	2−1	0−3	1−0−2	3−0	2−1	**8−5−2**
Detroit	0−2−1	0−3	2−1	0−3	0−3	**2−12−1**
Minnesota	2−0−1	1−2	1−2	1−2	1−2	**6−8−1**
St. Louis	2−1	1−1−1	1−1−1	3−0	2−1	**9−4−2**
Toronto	1−2	1−2	1−2	0−2−1	1−1−1	**4−9−2**

**Vs. Wales Conference**

**Vs. Adams Division**

1985–86 NHL records
Team	**BOS**	**BUF**	**HFD**	**MTL**	**QUE**	**Total**
Chicago	2−1	2−1	2−1	0−2−1	1−2	**7−7−1**
Detroit	1−2	1−1−1	1−2	0−3	1−2	**4−10−1**
Minnesota	0−3	1−2	2−1	1−1−1	1−2	**5−9−1**
St. Louis	2−1	1−2	1−1−1	2−1	2−1	**8−6−1**
Toronto	0−2−1	2−1	0−3	1−2	0−3	**3−11−1**

**Vs. Patrick Division**

1985–86 NHL records
Team	**NJD**	**NYI**	**NYR**	**PHI**	**PIT**	**WSH**	**Total**
Chicago	1−2	2−0−1	3−0	0−2−1	1−1−1	1−2	**8−7−3**
Detroit	0−2−1	0−3	0−3	1−2	1−2	1−2	**3−14−1**
Minnesota	2−1	2−0−1	2−1	0−2−1	0−3	1−2	**7−9−2**
St. Louis	2−1	1−1−1	1−1−1	1−2	1−2	0−3	**6−10−2**
Toronto	2−1	0−3	1−2	1−2	0−3	1−2	**5−13−0**

== Schedule and results ==
1985–86 regular season
October

Game	Result	Date	Score	Opponent	Record
1	W	October 12, 1985	4–3	@ Vancouver Canucks (1985–86)	1–0–0
2	L	October 13, 1985	3–6	@ Edmonton Oilers (1985–86)	1–1–0
3	W	October 16, 1985	2–1	@ Calgary Flames (1985–86)	2–1–0
4	W	October 19, 1985	4–3	New Jersey Devils (1985–86)	3–1–0
5	L	October 22, 1985	4–5	@ Minnesota North Stars (1985–86)	3–2–0
6	T	October 23, 1985	4–4 OT	Minnesota North Stars (1985–86)	3–2–1
7	L	October 26, 1985	2–5	New York Islanders (1985–86)	3–3–1
8	L	October 29, 1985	3–6	@ Washington Capitals (1985–86)	3–4–1

November

Game	Result	Date	Score	Opponent	Record
9	T	November 2, 1985	5–5 OT	Detroit Red Wings (1985–86)	3–4–2
10	W	November 3, 1985	4–3 OT	@ Winnipeg Jets (1985–86)	4–4–2
11	L	November 6, 1985	2–4	@ Detroit Red Wings (1985–86)	4–5–2
12	L	November 8, 1985	4–5	@ Buffalo Sabres (1985–86)	4–6–2
13	T	November 9, 1985	2–2 OT	@ Toronto Maple Leafs (1985–86)	4–6–3
14	W	November 12, 1985	4–3 OT	Toronto Maple Leafs (1985–86)	5–6–3
15	W	November 14, 1985	5–3	Quebec Nordiques (1985–86)	6–6–3
16	W	November 16, 1985	6–5 OT	Vancouver Canucks (1985–86)	7–6–3
17	L	November 20, 1985	1–3	@ Winnipeg Jets (1985–86)	7–7–3
18	W	November 21, 1985	4–2	@ Minnesota North Stars (1985–86)	8–7–3
19	L	November 23, 1985	3–7	Chicago Black Hawks (1985–86)	8–8–3
20	W	November 26, 1985	5–1	Toronto Maple Leafs (1985–86)	9–8–3
21	L	November 29, 1985	3–5	@ Detroit Red Wings (1985–86)	9–9–3
22	W	November 30, 1985	4–3	Minnesota North Stars (1985–86)	10–9–3

December

Game	Result	Date	Score	Opponent	Record
23	L	December 4, 1985	3–6	Buffalo Sabres (1985–86)	10–10–3
24	L	December 5, 1985	2–3 OT	@ Washington Capitals (1985–86)	10–11–3
25	W	December 7, 1985	5–4	Detroit Red Wings (1985–86)	11–11–3
26	W	December 10, 1985	7–3	Edmonton Oilers (1985–86)	12–11–3
27	L	December 11, 1985	4–6	@ Toronto Maple Leafs (1985–86)	12–12–3
28	T	December 14, 1985	2–2 OT	@ New York Islanders (1985–86)	12–12–4
29	W	December 15, 1985	3–2	@ New Jersey Devils (1985–86)	13–12–4
30	W	December 17, 1985	8–6	Winnipeg Jets (1985–86)	14–12–4
31	W	December 20, 1985	5–2	Calgary Flames (1985–86)	15–12–4
32	W	December 26, 1985	9–6	Chicago Black Hawks (1985–86)	16–12–4
33	L	December 28, 1985	1–5	Boston Bruins (1985–86)	16–13–4
34	L	December 31, 1985	4–8	Pittsburgh Penguins (1985–86)	16–14–4

January

Game	Result	Date	Score	Opponent	Record
35	W	January 4, 1986	2–1	Philadelphia Flyers (1985–86)	17–14–4
36	L	January 6, 1986	2–9	@ Montreal Canadiens (1985–86)	17–15–4
37	L	January 7, 1986	4–7	@ Quebec Nordiques (1985–86)	17–16–4
38	W	January 9, 1986	7–2	@ Boston Bruins (1985–86)	18–16–4
39	T	January 11, 1986	4–4 OT	Los Angeles Kings (1985–86)	18–16–5
40	T	January 12, 1986	2–2 OT	@ New York Rangers (1985–86)	18–16–6
41	W	January 15, 1986	10–1	Toronto Maple Leafs (1985–86)	19–16–6
42	L	January 16, 1986	3–4	@ Minnesota North Stars (1985–86)	19–17–6
43	L	January 18, 1986	2–5	Pittsburgh Penguins (1985–86)	19–18–6
44	L	January 21, 1986	3–6	@ Los Angeles Kings (1985–86)	19–19–6
45	W	January 23, 1986	4–3	@ Los Angeles Kings (1985–86)	20–19–6
46	L	January 25, 1986	0–1	Philadelphia Flyers (1985–86)	20–20–6
47	T	January 29, 1986	5–5 OT	Edmonton Oilers (1985–86)	20–20–7
48	W	January 31, 1986	6–4	@ Detroit Red Wings (1985–86)	21–20–7

February

Game	Result	Date	Score	Opponent	Record
49	W	February 1, 1986	4–3	Detroit Red Wings (1985–86)	22–20–7
50	W	February 5, 1986	4–3	New York Rangers (1985–86)	23–20–7
51	L	February 6, 1986	3–4	@ Philadelphia Flyers (1985–86)	23–21–7
52	L	February 8, 1986	2–3 OT	@ Toronto Maple Leafs (1985–86)	23–22–7
53	T	February 11, 1986	4–4 OT	Hartford Whalers (1985–86)	23–22–8
54	W	February 13, 1986	5–3	Minnesota North Stars (1985–86)	24–22–8
55	W	February 15, 1986	5–1	Boston Bruins (1985–86)	25–22–8
56	L	February 16, 1986	2–4	@ Chicago Black Hawks (1985–86)	25–23–8
57	W	February 18, 1986	5–0	Detroit Red Wings (1985–86)	26–23–8
58	L	February 20, 1986	2–3	@ New York Rangers (1985–86)	26–24–8
59	W	February 22, 1986	5–3	@ Pittsburgh Penguins (1985–86)	27–24–8
60	W	February 23, 1986	8–2	@ Hartford Whalers (1985–86)	28–24–8
61	L	February 25, 1986	1–4	Calgary Flames (1985–86)	28–25–8

March

Game	Result	Date	Score	Opponent	Record
62	W	March 1, 1986	6–3	Chicago Black Hawks (1985–86)	29–25–8
63	L	March 2, 1986	4–6	@ Chicago Black Hawks (1985–86)	29–26–8
64	W	March 4, 1986	6–3	@ Quebec Nordiques (1985–86)	30–26–8
65	W	March 6, 1986	7–4	@ Montreal Canadiens (1985–86)	31–26–8
66	W	March 8, 1986	7–3	Vancouver Canucks (1985–86)	32–26–8
67	L	March 9, 1986	2–4	@ Chicago Black Hawks (1985–86)	32–27–8
68	W	March 11, 1986	3–2 OT	Buffalo Sabres (1985–86)	33–27–8
69	L	March 13, 1986	2–3	Minnesota North Stars (1985–86)	33–28–8
70	L	March 15, 1986	4–5	Washington Capitals (1985–86)	33–29–8
71	L	March 17, 1986	5–6 OT	@ Minnesota North Stars (1985–86)	33–30–8
72	L	March 19, 1986	2–5	Hartford Whalers (1985–86)	33–31–8
73	W	March 20, 1986	3–2 OT	@ Detroit Red Wings (1985–86)	34–31–8
74	W	March 22, 1986	3–2	Montreal Canadiens (1985–86)	35–31–8
75	W	March 25, 1986	2–0	@ New York Islanders (1985–86)	36–31–8
76	L	March 27, 1986	0–1	@ New Jersey Devils (1985–86)	36–32–8
77	L	March 29, 1986	1–4	@ Toronto Maple Leafs (1985–86)	36–33–8

April

Game	Result	Date	Score	Opponent	Record
78	T	April 1, 1986	2–2 OT	Toronto Maple Leafs (1985–86)	36–33–9
79	W	April 5, 1986	7–5	Chicago Black Hawks (1985–86)	37–33–9
80	L	April 6, 1986	1–3	@ Chicago Black Hawks (1985–86)	37–34–9

Legend: Win (2 points) Loss (0 points) Tie (1 point)

== Player statistics ==
=== Regular season ===
Scoring

Player	Pos	GP	G	A	Pts	PIM	+/-	PPG	SHG	GWG
Bernie Federko	C	80	34	68	102	34	10	16	0	2
Mark Hunter	RW	78	44	30	74	171	15	11	2	3
Ron Flockhart	C	79	22	45	67	26	8	5	2	3
Rob Ramage	D	77	10	56	66	171	18	7	0	2
Doug Gilmour	C	74	25	28	53	41	-3	2	1	5
Joe Mullen	RW	48	28	24	52	10	-7	9	0	4
Dave Barr	RW	72	13	38	51	70	11	0	0	2
Brian Sutter	LW	44	19	23	42	87	-12	8	0	1
Kevin LaVallee	LW	64	18	20	38	8	8	7	0	2
Mark Reeds	RW	78	10	28	38	28	11	0	0	2
Greg Paslawski	RW	56	22	11	33	18	-12	1	1	2
Rick Meagher	C	79	11	19	30	28	-1	0	3	3
Lee Norwood	D	71	5	24	29	134	7	2	0	1
Ric Nattress	D	78	4	20	24	52	-8	1	0	2
Bruce Bell	D	75	2	18	20	43	2	2	0	0
Doug Wickenheiser	C	36	8	11	19	16	11	0	0	2
Eddy Beers	LW	24	7	11	18	24	-3	4	0	0
Gino Cavallini	LW	30	6	5	11	36	-2	1	0	0
Jim Pavese	D	69	4	7	11	116	-3	1	0	0
Charlie Bourgeois	D	31	2	7	9	116	9	1	0	1
Denis Cyr	RW	31	3	4	7	2	-11	0	0	0
Kent Carlson	D	26	2	3	5	42	2	0	0	0
Terry Johnson	D	49	0	4	4	87	-6	0	0	0
Rik Wilson	D	32	0	4	4	48	-9	0	0	0
Normand Baron	LW	23	2	0	2	39	-7	0	0	0
Doug Evans	LW	13	1	0	1	2	0	0	0	0
Darrell May	G	3	0	1	1	2	0	0	0	0
Greg Millen	G	36	0	1	1	8	0	0	0	0
Shawn Evans	D	7	0	0	0	2	-1	0	0	0
Mike Posavad	D	6	0	0	0	0	-1	0	0	0
Herb Raglan	RW	7	0	0	0	5	-3	0	0	0
Rick Wamsley	G	42	0	0	0	2	0	0	0	0

Goaltending

Player	MIN	GP	W	L	T	GA	GAA	SO	SA	SV	SV%
Rick Wamsley	2517	42	22	16	3	144	3.43	1	1354	1210	.894
Greg Millen	2168	36	14	16	6	129	3.57	1	1140	1011	.887
Darrell May	184	3	1	2	0	13	4.24	0	86	73	.849
Team:	4869	80	37	34	9	286	3.52	2	2580	2294	.889

=== Playoffs ===
Scoring

Player	Pos	GP	G	A	Pts	PIM	+/-	PPG	SHG	GWG
Doug Gilmour	C	19	9	12	21	25	3	1	2	2
Bernie Federko	C	19	7	14	21	17	2	1	0	1
Greg Paslawski	RW	17	10	7	17	13	4	2	0	0
Mark Hunter	RW	19	7	7	14	48	-7	2	0	1
Rob Ramage	D	19	1	10	11	66	2	0	0	0
Gino Cavallini	LW	17	4	5	9	10	8	0	0	2
Lee Norwood	D	19	2	7	9	64	12	0	0	0
Rick Meagher	C	19	4	4	8	12	8	0	1	0
Mark Reeds	RW	19	4	4	8	2	8	0	0	1
Eddy Beers	LW	19	3	4	7	8	-4	2	0	1
Doug Wickenheiser	C	19	2	5	7	12	1	1	0	1
Ric Nattress	D	18	1	4	5	24	4	0	0	0
Charlie Bourgeois	D	19	2	2	4	116	3	1	0	0
Kevin LaVallee	LW	13	2	2	4	6	2	0	0	0
Ron Flockhart	C	8	1	3	4	6	-6	0	0	0
Brian Benning	D	6	1	2	3	13	1	1	0	0
Brian Sutter	LW	9	1	2	3	22	-4	0	0	0
Dave Barr	RW	11	1	1	2	14	1	1	0	0
Herb Raglan	RW	10	1	1	2	24	2	0	0	0
Cliff Ronning	C	5	1	1	2	2	0	1	0	0
Bruce Bell	D	14	0	2	2	13	-5	0	0	0
Jim Pavese	D	19	0	2	2	51	-2	0	0	0
Kent Carlson	D	5	0	0	0	11	0	0	0	0
Greg Millen	G	10	0	0	0	0	0	0	0	0
Rick Wamsley	G	10	0	0	0	0	0	0	0	0

Goaltending

Player	MIN	GP	W	L	GA	GAA	SO	SA	SV	SV%
Greg Millen	586	10	6	3	29	2.97	0	330	301	.912
Rick Wamsley	569	10	4	6	37	3.90	0	307	270	.879
Team:	1155	19	10	9	66	3.43	0	637	571	.896

Note:

Pos = Position;GP = Games played; G = Goals; A = Assists; Pts = Points; PIM = Penalty minutes; +/- = Plus/minus; PPG = Power-play goals; SHG = Short-handed goals; GWG = Game-winning goals
Pos = Position;GP = Games played; Min, TOI = Minutes played; W = Wins; L = Losses; T,T/OT = Ties; OTL = Overtime losses; GA = Goals-against; GAA = Goals-against average; SO = Shutouts; SA = Shots against; SV = Shots saved;SV% = Save percentage;

== Draft picks ==
St. Louis's draft picks at the 1985 NHL entry draft held at the Metro Toronto Convention Centre in Toronto, Ontario.

Round	#	Player	Nationality	College/Junior/Club team (League)
2	37	Herb Raglan	Canada	Kingston Canadians (OHL)
3	44	Nelson Emerson	Canada	Stratford Cullitons (OPJHL)
3	54	Ned Desmond	United States	Hotchkiss School (USHS-CT)
5	100	Dan Brooks	United States	Saint Thomas Academy (USHS-MN)
6	121	Rick Burchill	United States	Catholic Memorial School (USHS-MA)
7	138	Pat Jablonski	United States	Detroit Compuware Ambassadors (NAHL)
8	159	Scott Brickey	United States	Port Huron Flags (NAHL)
9	180	Jeff Urban	United States	Minnetonka High School (USHS-MN)
10	201	Vince Guidotti	United States	Noble and Greenough School (USHS-MA)
11	222	Ron Saatzer	United States	Hopkins High School (USHS-MN)
12	243	Dave Jecha	United States	Minnetonka High School (USHS-MN)
