= Don Dietrich =

Don Dietrich is the name of:

- Don Dietrich (musician), saxophonist
- Don Dietrich (ice hockey) (born 1961), professional ice hockey player
