= 1985–86 New Jersey Devils season =

National Hockey League season

1985–86 New Jersey Devils
- Division: 6th Patrick
- Conference: 11th Wales
- 1985–86 record: 28–49–3
- Home record: 17–21–2
- Road record: 11–28–1
- Goals for: 300
- Goals against: 374

Team information
- General manager: Max McNab
- Coach: Doug Carpenter
- Captain: Mel Bridgman
- Alternate captains: Unknown
- Arena: Brendan Byrne Arena

Team leaders
- Goals: Greg Adams (35)
- Assists: Greg Adams (42)
- Points: Greg Adams (77)
- Penalty minutes: Joe Cirella (147)
- Plus/minus: Bruce Driver (+9)
- Wins: Alain Chevrier (11)
- Goals against average: Chico Resch (4.29)

The 1985–86 New Jersey Devils season was the 12th season for the National Hockey League (NHL) franchise that was established on June 11, 1974, and fourth season since the franchise relocated from Colorado prior to the 1982–83 NHL season. Kirk Muller making the All-Star Game was the highlight of the season for the Devils, as they finished in last place in their division and conference, good for the third-worst record in the league. This was the franchise's eighth consecutive season out of the playoffs.

== Regular season ==
=== Final standings ===
Patrick Division
	GP	W	L	T	GF	GA	Pts
**Philadelphia Flyers**	80	53	23	4	335	241	110
**Washington Capitals**	80	50	23	7	315	272	107
**New York Islanders**	80	39	29	12	327	284	90
**New York Rangers**	80	36	38	6	280	276	78
Pittsburgh Penguins	80	34	38	8	313	305	76
New Jersey Devils	80	28	49	3	300	374	59

Note: GP = Games played, W = Wins, L = Losses, T = Ties, Pts = Points, GF = Goals for, GA = Goals against
Note: Teams that qualified for the playoffs are highlighted in bold.

=== Record vs. opponents ===
Patrick Division record vs. opponents

==== Vs. Wales Conference ====
**Vs. Patrick Division**

1985–86 NHL records
Team	**NJD**	**NYI**	**NYR**	**PHI**	**PIT**	**WSH**	**Total**
New Jersey	—	2−5	2−5	3−4	2−4−1	1−6	10−24−1
N.Y. Islanders	5−2	—	3−3−1	4−3	5−1−1	3−4	20−13−2
N.Y. Rangers	5−2	3−3−1	—	1−6	2−4−1	3−3−1	14−18−3
Philadelphia	4−3	3−4	6−1	—	6−0−1	5−2	24−10−1
Pittsburgh	4−2−1	1−5−1	4−2−1	0–6−1	—	1−6	10−21−4
Washington	6−1	4−3	3−3−1	2–5	6−1	—	21−13−1

**Vs. Adams Division**

1985–86 NHL records
Team	**BOS**	**BUF**	**HFD**	**MTL**	**QUE**	**Total**
New Jersey	0−3	1−2	1−2	1−2	2−1	5−10−0
N.Y. Islanders	1−0−2	1−2	2−1	1−2	1−2	6−7−2
N.Y. Rangers	2−1	0−3	1−2	2−0−1	0−2−1	5−8−2
Philadelphia	2−1	1−2	3−0	2−1	1−1−1	9−5−1
Pittsburgh	1−2	2−0−1	1−2	0−2−1	1−1−1	5−7−3
Washington	2−0−1	1−1−1	2−0−1	2−0−1	3−0	10−1−4

==== Vs. Campbell Conference ====
**Vs. Norris Division**

1985–86 NHL records
Team	**CHI**	**DET**	**MIN**	**STL**	**TOR**	**Total**
New Jersey	2−1	2−0−1	1−2	1−2	1−2	7−7−1
N.Y. Islanders	0−2−1	3−0	0−2−1	1−1−1	3−0	7−5−3
N.Y. Rangers	0−3	3−0	1−2	1−1−1	2−1	7−7−1
Philadelphia	2−0−1	2−1	2−0−1	2−1	2−1	10−3−2
Pittsburgh	1−1−1	2−1	3−0	2−1	3−0	11−3−1
Washington	2−1	2−1	2−1	3−0	2−1	11−4−0

**Vs. Smythe Division**

1985–86 NHL records
Team	**CGY**	**EDM**	**LAK**	**VAN**	**WIN**	**Total**
New Jersey	0−2−1	0−3	2−1	2−1	2−1	6−8−1
N.Y. Islanders	1−1−1	0−1−2	2−1	1−1−1	2−0−1	6−4−5
N.Y. Rangers	1−2	2−1	2−1	3−0	2−1	10−5−0
Philadelphia	2−1	1−2	3−0	2−1	2−1	10−5−0
Pittsburgh	1−2	1−2	2−1	2−1	2−1	8−7−0
Washington	0−3	3−0	2−1	2−0−1	1−1−1	8−5−2

== Schedule and results ==
1985–86 regular season
October

Game	Result	Date	Score	Opponent	Record
1	W	October 10, 1985	6–5	@ Philadelphia Flyers (season)	1–0–0
2	W	October 12, 1985	4–1	Washington Capitals (season)	2–0–0
3	W	October 13, 1985	3–2 OT	@ New York Rangers (season)	3–0–0
4	L	October 17, 1985	3–4 OT	Hartford Whalers (season)	3–1–0
5	L	October 19, 1985	3–4	@ St. Louis Blues (season)	3–2–0
6	L	October 23, 1985	1–5	@ New York Rangers (season)	3–3–0
7	L	October 24, 1985	4–6	Chicago Black Hawks (season)	3–4–0
8	W	October 26, 1985	5–2	Los Angeles Kings (season)	4–4–0
9	L	October 29, 1985	4–6	Boston Bruins (season)	4–5–0
10	T	October 31, 1985	2–2 OT	Detroit Red Wings (season)	4–5–1

November

Game	Result	Date	Score	Opponent	Record
11	W	November 2, 1985	6–5 OT	New York Rangers (season)	5–5–1
12	L	November 6, 1985	2–5	Calgary Flames (season)	5–6–1
13	W	November 8, 1985	5–3	Pittsburgh Penguins (season)	6–6–1
14	L	November 9, 1985	2–3	@ New York Islanders (season)	6–7–1
15	L	November 15, 1985	3–5	@ Winnipeg Jets (season)	6–8–1
16	L	November 16, 1985	2–7	@ Calgary Flames (season)	6–9–1
17	W	November 19, 1985	6–3	@ Los Angeles Kings (season)	7–9–1
18	W	November 22, 1985	6–5	@ Vancouver Canucks (season)	8–9–1
19	L	November 23, 1985	2–3	@ Edmonton Oilers (season)	8–10–1
20	W	November 26, 1985	4–3	Winnipeg Jets (season)	9–10–1
21	L	November 30, 1985	2–6	Washington Capitals (season)	9–11–1

December

Game	Result	Date	Score	Opponent	Record
22	L	December 1, 1985	2–4	@ Boston Bruins (season)	9–12–1
23	L	December 4, 1985	7–10	@ Toronto Maple Leafs (season)	9–13–1
24	W	December 6, 1985	4–1	Vancouver Canucks (season)	10–13–1
25	W	December 7, 1985	5–1	@ Pittsburgh Penguins (season)	11–13–1
26	W	December 9, 1985	6–4	@ Minnesota North Stars (season)	12–13–1
27	L	December 11, 1985	2–4	New York Rangers (season)	12–14–1
28	L	December 14, 1985	3–9	@ Quebec Nordiques (season)	12–15–1
29	L	December 15, 1985	2–3	St. Louis Blues (season)	12–16–1
30	W	December 17, 1985	7–4	Philadelphia Flyers (season)	13–16–1
31	L	December 19, 1985	3–6	@ Philadelphia Flyers (season)	13–17–1
32	L	December 21, 1985	6–7	@ Hartford Whalers (season)	13–18–1
33	L	December 22, 1985	3–8	Minnesota North Stars (season)	13–19–1
34	L	December 27, 1985	3–7	Montreal Canadiens (season)	13–20–1
35	L	December 28, 1985	3–8	@ Montreal Canadiens (season)	13–21–1

January

Game	Result	Date	Score	Opponent	Record
36	L	January 3, 1986	2–3	Washington Capitals (season)	13–22–1
37	L	January 4, 1986	3–9	@ Washington Capitals (season)	13–23–1
38	L	January 6, 1986	3–4	@ Pittsburgh Penguins (season)	13–24–1
39	W	January 8, 1986	8–7	@ Chicago Black Hawks (season)	14–24–1
40	L	January 11, 1986	4–8	Philadelphia Flyers (season)	14–25–1
41	L	January 14, 1986	2–3	@ Philadelphia Flyers (season)	14–26–1
42	W	January 15, 1986	4–3 OT	@ Detroit Red Wings (season)	15–26–1
43	L	January 17, 1986	3–4	Washington Capitals (season)	15–27–1
44	L	January 19, 1986	3–6	Buffalo Sabres (season)	15–28–1
45	L	January 21, 1986	3–5	@ Vancouver Canucks (season)	15–29–1
46	T	January 22, 1986	6–6 OT	@ Calgary Flames (season)	15–29–2
47	L	January 24, 1986	6–7 OT	@ Edmonton Oilers (season)	15–30–2
48	L	January 27, 1986	2–6	@ Minnesota North Stars (season)	15–31–2
49	L	January 29, 1986	1–4	Pittsburgh Penguins (season)	15–32–2

February

Game	Result	Date	Score	Opponent	Record
50	L	February 1, 1986	4–5	@ Washington Capitals (season)	15–33–2
51	L	February 2, 1986	2–3 OT	New York Islanders (season)	15–34–2
52	L	February 6, 1986	4–6	Edmonton Oilers (season)	15–35–2
53	L	February 8, 1986	0–4	@ Pittsburgh Penguins (season)	15–36–2
54	W	February 9, 1986	6–3	@ Hartford Whalers (season)	16–36–2
55	W	February 13, 1986	4–3	Montreal Canadiens (season)	17–36–2
56	L	February 15, 1986	5–6	@ New York Islanders (season)	17–37–2
57	T	February 16, 1986	5–5 OT	Pittsburgh Penguins (season)	17–37–3
58	W	February 20, 1986	4–3 OT	Quebec Nordiques (season)	18–37–3
59	L	February 22, 1986	2–5	Los Angeles Kings (season)	18–38–3
60	W	February 26, 1986	7–2	New York Islanders (season)	19–38–3

March

Game	Result	Date	Score	Opponent	Record
61	L	March 1, 1986	3–8	@ Boston Bruins (season)	19–39–3
62	W	March 2, 1986	6–4	Winnipeg Jets (season)	20–39–3
63	L	March 4, 1986	2–4	@ Washington Capitals (season)	20–40–3
64	W	March 6, 1986	7–2	Detroit Red Wings (season)	21–40–3
65	W	March 8, 1986	7–3	Philadelphia Flyers (season)	22–40–3
66	L	March 9, 1986	3–4	@ Buffalo Sabres (season)	22–41–3
67	L	March 11, 1986	3–6	New York Rangers (season)	22–42–3
68	L	March 13, 1986	4–7	Toronto Maple Leafs (season)	22–43–3
69	L	March 15, 1986	1–3	@ New York Islanders (season)	22–44–3
70	L	March 16, 1986	1–4	@ Philadelphia Flyers (season)	22–45–3
71	L	March 19, 1986	3–7	Pittsburgh Penguins (season)	22–46–3
72	W	March 21, 1986	6–3	@ Buffalo Sabres (season)	23–46–3
73	W	March 22, 1986	6–3	@ Toronto Maple Leafs (season)	24–46–3
74	L	March 25, 1986	4–5	New York Rangers (season)	24–47–3
75	W	March 27, 1986	1–0	St. Louis Blues (season)	25–47–3
76	W	March 29, 1986	3–2	Chicago Black Hawks (season)	26–47–3
77	L	March 31, 1986	0–9	@ New York Rangers (season)	26–48–3

April

Game	Result	Date	Score	Opponent	Record
78	W	April 2, 1986	6–5	Quebec Nordiques (season)	27–48–3
79	L	April 5, 1986	1–7	@ New York Islanders (season)	27–49–3
80	W	April 6, 1986	9–7	New York Islanders (season)	28–49–3

Legend: Win (2 points) Loss (0 points) Tie (1 point)

== Player statistics ==
=== Regular season ===
Scoring

Player	Pos	GP	G	A	Pts	PIM	+/-	PPG	SHG	GWG
Greg Adams	LW	78	35	42	77	30	-7	10	0	2
Kirk Muller	LW	77	25	41	66	45	-20	5	1	1
Mel Bridgman	C	78	23	40	63	80	-1	5	1	1
Mark Johnson	C	80	21	41	62	16	-13	6	1	3
John MacLean	RW	74	21	36	57	112	-3	1	0	4
Pat Verbeek	RW	76	25	28	53	79	-24	4	1	0
Doug Sulliman	RW	73	21	22	43	20	-10	6	1	5
Peter McNab	C	71	19	24	43	14	-11	6	0	0
Aaron Broten	LW/C	66	18	25	43	26	2	4	0	1
Rich Preston	RW	76	19	22	41	65	3	3	0	2
Paul Gagne	LW	47	19	19	38	14	-15	4	0	3
Joe Cirella	D	66	6	23	29	147	-12	2	0	0
Tim Higgins	RW	59	9	17	26	47	7	2	0	1
Uli Hiemer	D	50	8	16	24	61	-1	6	0	1
Perry Anderson	LW	51	7	12	19	91	-7	1	0	1
Dave Pichette	D	33	7	12	19	22	-11	4	0	1
Bruce Driver	D	40	3	15	18	32	9	1	0	1
Craig Wolanin	D	44	2	16	18	74	-7	0	0	1
Dave Lewis	D	69	0	15	15	81	0	0	0	0
Jan Ludvig	RW	42	5	9	14	63	-16	0	0	0
Ken Daneyko	D	44	0	10	10	100	0	0	0	0
Randy Velischek	D	47	2	7	9	39	-20	0	0	0
Phil Russell	D	30	2	3	5	51	-17	0	0	0
Bob Lorimer	D	46	2	2	4	52	-13	0	0	0
Alain Chevrier	G	37	0	3	3	0	0	0	0	0
Dan Dorion	C	3	1	1	2	0	-1	0	0	0
Pat Conacher	LW	2	0	2	2	2	0	0	0	0
Don Dietrich	D	11	0	2	2	10	-8	0	0	0
Craig Billington	G	18	0	1	1	0	0	0	0	0
Murray Brumwell	D	1	0	0	0	0	-1	0	0	0
Alan Hepple	D	1	0	0	0	0	0	0	0	0
Kirk McLean	G	2	0	0	0	0	0	0	0	0
Glenn Resch	G	31	0	0	0	14	0	0	0	0
Sam St. Laurent	G	4	0	0	0	0	0	0	0	0
Allan Stewart	LW	4	0	0	0	21	-1	0	0	0

Goaltending

Player	MIN	GP	W	L	T	GA	GAA	SO	SA	SV	SV%
Alain Chevrier	1862	37	11	18	2	143	4.61	0	951	808	.850
Glenn Resch	1769	31	10	20	0	126	4.27	0	885	759	.858
Craig Billington	901	18	4	9	1	77	5.13	0	482	405	.840
Sam St. Laurent	188	4	2	1	0	13	4.15	1	111	98	.883
Kirk McLean	111	2	1	1	0	11	5.95	0	59	48	.814
Team:	4831	80	28	49	3	370	4.60	1	2488	2118	.851

Note: GP = Games played; G = Goals; A = Assists; Pts = Points; +/- = Plus/minus; PIM = Penalty minutes; PPG=Power-play goals; SHG=Short-handed goals; GWG=Game-winning goals
MIN=Minutes played; W = Wins; L = Losses; T = Ties; GA = Goals against; GAA = Goals against average; SO = Shutouts; SA=Shots against; SV=Shots saved; SV% = Save percentage;

== Draft picks ==
New Jersey's draft picks at the 1985 NHL entry draft.

Rd #	Pick #	Player	Nat	Pos	Team (League)	Notes
1	3	Craig Wolanin	United States	D	Kitchener Rangers (OHL)	
2	24	Sean Burke	Canada	G	Toronto Marlboros (OHL)	
2	32	Eric Weinrich	United States	D	North Yarmouth Academy (Maine)	(Note: The Devils acquired the 1985 second-round pick, along with Rich Preston and Don Dietrich, from Chicago in exchange for Bob MacMillan and their 1985 fifth-round pick (used on Rick Herbert) on June 16, 1984.)
3	45	Myles O'Connor	Canada	D	Notre Dame H.S. Hounds (SJHL)	
4	66	Greg Polak	United States	LW	Lincoln H.S. (Rhode Island)	
5	87	No fifth-round pick				
6	108	Bill McMillan	Canada	RW	Peterborough Petes (OHL)	
7	129	Kevin Schrader	United States	D	Burnsville H.S. (Minnesota)	
8	150	Ed Krayer	United States	LW	St. Paul's H.S. (New Hampshire)	
9	171	Jamie Huscroft	Canada	D	Seattle Breakers (WHL)	
10	192	Terry Shold	United States	LW	International Falls H.S. (Minnesota)	
11	213	Jamie McKinley	Canada	RW	Guelph Platers (OHL)	
12	234	David Williams	United States	D	Choate H.S. (Connecticut)	
