= 1985–86 New York Islanders season =

NHL hockey team season

1985–86 New York Islanders
- Division: 3rd Patrick
- Conference: 4th Wales
- 1985–86 record: 39–29–12
- Home record: 22–11–7
- Road record: 17–18–5
- Goals for: 327
- Goals against: 284

Team information
- General manager: Bill Torrey
- Coach: Al Arbour
- Captain: Denis Potvin
- Alternate captains: Brent Sutter; Bryan Trottier
- Arena: Nassau Coliseum

Team leaders
- Goals: Mike Bossy (61)
- Assists: Mike Bossy (62)
- Points: Mike Bossy (123)
- Penalty minutes: Duane Sutter (157)
- Plus/minus: Denis Potvin (+34)
- Wins: Billy Smith (20)
- Goals against average: Kelly Hrudey (3.21)

The 1985–86 New York Islanders season was the 14th season for the franchise in the National Hockey League (NHL).

== Regular season ==
- January 28: In a 9–2 victory over the Toronto Maple Leafs, Denis Potvin breaks Bobby Orr's NHL career record for goals by a defenseman.

=== Final standings ===
Patrick Division
	GP	W	L	T	GF	GA	Pts
**Philadelphia Flyers**	80	53	23	4	335	241	110
**Washington Capitals**	80	50	23	7	315	272	107
**New York Islanders**	80	39	29	12	327	284	90
**New York Rangers**	80	36	38	6	280	276	78
Pittsburgh Penguins	80	34	38	8	313	305	76
New Jersey Devils	80	28	49	3	300	374	59

Note: GP = Games played, W = Wins, L = Losses, T = Ties, Pts = Points, GF = Goals for, GA = Goals against
Note: Teams that qualified for the playoffs are highlighted in bold.

=== Record vs. opponents ===
Patrick Division record vs. opponents

==== Vs. Wales Conference ====
**Vs. Patrick Division**

1985–86 NHL records
Team	**NJD**	**NYI**	**NYR**	**PHI**	**PIT**	**WSH**	**Total**
New Jersey	—	2−5	2−5	3−4	2−4−1	1−6	10−24−1
N.Y. Islanders	5−2	—	3−3−1	4−3	5−1−1	3−4	20−13−2
N.Y. Rangers	5−2	3−3−1	—	1−6	2−4−1	3−3−1	14−18−3
Philadelphia	4−3	3−4	6−1	—	6−0−1	5−2	24−10−1
Pittsburgh	4−2−1	1−5−1	4−2−1	0–6−1	—	1−6	10−21−4
Washington	6−1	4−3	3−3−1	2–5	6−1	—	21−13−1

**Vs. Adams Division**

1985–86 NHL records
Team	**BOS**	**BUF**	**HFD**	**MTL**	**QUE**	**Total**
New Jersey	0−3	1−2	1−2	1−2	2−1	5−10−0
N.Y. Islanders	1−0−2	1−2	2−1	1−2	1−2	6−7−2
N.Y. Rangers	2−1	0−3	1−2	2−0−1	0−2−1	5−8−2
Philadelphia	2−1	1−2	3−0	2−1	1−1−1	9−5−1
Pittsburgh	1−2	2−0−1	1−2	0−2−1	1−1−1	5−7−3
Washington	2−0−1	1−1−1	2−0−1	2−0−1	3−0	10−1−4

==== Vs. Campbell Conference ====
**Vs. Norris Division**

1985–86 NHL records
Team	**CHI**	**DET**	**MIN**	**STL**	**TOR**	**Total**
New Jersey	2−1	2−0−1	1−2	1−2	1−2	7−7−1
N.Y. Islanders	0−2−1	3−0	0−2−1	1−1−1	3−0	7−5−3
N.Y. Rangers	0−3	3−0	1−2	1−1−1	2−1	7−7−1
Philadelphia	2−0−1	2−1	2−0−1	2−1	2−1	10−3−2
Pittsburgh	1−1−1	2−1	3−0	2−1	3−0	11−3−1
Washington	2−1	2−1	2−1	3−0	2−1	11−4−0

**Vs. Smythe Division**

1985–86 NHL records
Team	**CGY**	**EDM**	**LAK**	**VAN**	**WIN**	**Total**
New Jersey	0−2−1	0−3	2−1	2−1	2−1	6−8−1
N.Y. Islanders	1−1−1	0−1−2	2−1	1−1−1	2−0−1	6−4−5
N.Y. Rangers	1−2	2−1	2−1	3−0	2−1	10−5−0
Philadelphia	2−1	1−2	3−0	2−1	2−1	10−5−0
Pittsburgh	1−2	1−2	2−1	2−1	2−1	8−7−0
Washington	0−3	3−0	2−1	2−0−1	1−1−1	8−5−2

== Schedule and results ==
1985–86 regular season
October

Game	Result	Date	Score	Opponent	Record
1	W	October 12, 1985	5–4 OT	@ Los Angeles Kings (1985–86)	1–0–0
2	L	October 14, 1985	2–4	@ Vancouver Canucks (1985–86)	1–1–0
3	L	October 16, 1985	4–6	@ Edmonton Oilers (1985–86)	1–2–0
4	W	October 19, 1985	5–4	New York Rangers (1985–86)	2–2–0
5	T	October 22, 1985	2–2 OT	Vancouver Canucks (1985–86)	2–2–1
6	W	October 24, 1985	6–5	Quebec Nordiques (1985–86)	3–2–1
7	W	October 26, 1985	5–2	@ St. Louis Blues (1985–86)	4–2–1
8	L	October 29, 1985	2–3	Los Angeles Kings (1985–86)	4–3–1

November

Game	Result	Date	Score	Opponent	Record
9	L	November 1, 1985	3–5	@ Washington Capitals (1985–86)	4–4–1
10	W	November 2, 1985	5–3	Washington Capitals (1985–86)	5–4–1
11	T	November 5, 1985	4–4 OT	Calgary Flames (1985–86)	5–4–2
12	W	November 6, 1985	5–4	@ Toronto Maple Leafs (1985–86)	6–4–2
13	W	November 9, 1985	3–2	New Jersey Devils (1985–86)	7–4–2
14	L	November 12, 1985	2–3	Montreal Canadiens (1985–86)	7–5–2
15	T	November 16, 1985	4–4 OT	Edmonton Oilers (1985–86)	7–5–3
16	L	November 17, 1985	4–5 OT	@ Philadelphia Flyers (1985–86)	7–6–3
17	W	November 19, 1985	8–6	Philadelphia Flyers (1985–86)	8–6–3
18	T	November 21, 1985	4–4 OT	@ Boston Bruins (1985–86)	8–6–4
19	L	November 23, 1985	0–5	New York Rangers (1985–86)	8–7–4
20	W	November 24, 1985	4–3 OT	@ New York Rangers (1985–86)	9–7–4
21	T	November 27, 1985	4–4 OT	@ Minnesota North Stars (1985–86)	9–7–5
22	W	November 29, 1985	4–1	@ Winnipeg Jets (1985–86)	10–7–5
23	L	November 30, 1985	3–4	@ Calgary Flames (1985–86)	10–8–5

December

Game	Result	Date	Score	Opponent	Record
24	T	December 3, 1985	4–4 OT	Winnipeg Jets (1985–86)	10–8–6
25	L	December 6, 1985	3–7	@ Quebec Nordiques (1985–86)	10–9–6
26	L	December 7, 1985	1–4	Quebec Nordiques (1985–86)	10–10–6
27	W	December 10, 1985	7–4	Pittsburgh Penguins (1985–86)	11–10–6
28	T	December 11, 1985	4–4 OT	@ Pittsburgh Penguins (1985–86)	11–10–7
29	T	December 14, 1985	2–2 OT	St. Louis Blues (1985–86)	11–10–8
30	W	December 17, 1985	7–3	Buffalo Sabres (1985–86)	12–10–8
31	T	December 20, 1985	2–2 OT	@ New York Rangers (1985–86)	12–10–9
32	L	December 21, 1985	4–5	New York Rangers (1985–86)	12–11–9
33	W	December 23, 1985	6–3	@ Hartford Whalers (1985–86)	13–11–9
34	L	December 26, 1985	3–4	Hartford Whalers (1985–86)	13–12–9
35	W	December 28, 1985	4–2	@ Pittsburgh Penguins (1985–86)	14–12–9
36	L	December 29, 1985	3–4	@ Buffalo Sabres (1985–86)	14–13–9
37	W	December 31, 1985	5–4 OT	@ Detroit Red Wings (1985–86)	15–13–9

January

Game	Result	Date	Score	Opponent	Record
38	W	January 2, 1986	7–5	Boston Bruins (1985–86)	16–13–9
39	L	January 4, 1986	1–4	Chicago Black Hawks (1985–86)	16–14–9
40	L	January 7, 1986	2–3	Minnesota North Stars (1985–86)	16–15–9
41	W	January 9, 1986	9–0	Pittsburgh Penguins (1985–86)	17–15–9
42	W	January 11, 1986	8–2	Detroit Red Wings (1985–86)	18–15–9
43	L	January 15, 1986	3–6	@ Pittsburgh Penguins (1985–86)	18–16–9
44	W	January 17, 1986	4–3	@ Philadelphia Flyers (1985–86)	19–16–9
45	L	January 18, 1986	0–3	@ Montreal Canadiens (1985–86)	19–17–9
46	W	January 21, 1986	7–3	Philadelphia Flyers (1985–86)	20–17–9
47	W	January 24, 1986	7–5	@ Washington Capitals (1985–86)	21–17–9
48	T	January 25, 1986	3–3 OT	Chicago Black Hawks (1985–86)	21–17–10
49	W	January 28, 1986	9–2	Toronto Maple Leafs (1985–86)	22–17–10
50	W	January 30, 1986	8–4	Philadelphia Flyers (1985–86)	23–17–10

February

Game	Result	Date	Score	Opponent	Record
51	W	February 1, 1986	4–3	Pittsburgh Penguins (1985–86)	24–17–10
52	W	February 2, 1986	3–2 OT	@ New Jersey Devils (1985–86)	25–17–10
53	L	February 5, 1986	2–3	@ Chicago Black Hawks (1985–86)	25–18–10
54	W	February 8, 1986	4–3	@ Los Angeles Kings (1985–86)	26–18–10
55	W	February 11, 1986	1–0	Vancouver Canucks (1985–86)	27–18–10
56	L	February 13, 1986	3–6	@ Philadelphia Flyers (1985–86)	27–19–10
57	W	February 15, 1986	6–5	New Jersey Devils (1985–86)	28–19–10
58	L	February 18, 1986	4–5	Washington Capitals (1985–86)	28–20–10
59	L	February 21, 1986	1–5	@ Buffalo Sabres (1985–86)	28–21–10
60	W	February 22, 1986	5–2	Detroit Red Wings (1985–86)	29–21–10
61	L	February 26, 1986	2–7	@ New Jersey Devils (1985–86)	29–22–10
62	W	February 28, 1986	6–3	@ Winnipeg Jets (1985–86)	30–22–10

March

Game	Result	Date	Score	Opponent	Record
63	L	March 1, 1986	4–5	@ Minnesota North Stars (1985–86)	30–23–10
64	W	March 4, 1986	6–3	Montreal Canadiens (1985–86)	31–23–10
65	L	March 8, 1986	2–6	Washington Capitals (1985–86)	31–24–10
66	L	March 9, 1986	1–3	@ Washington Capitals (1985–86)	31–25–10
67	W	March 11, 1986	8–4	Calgary Flames (1985–86)	32–25–10
68	W	March 13, 1986	3–2	@ Hartford Whalers (1985–86)	33–25–10
69	W	March 15, 1986	3–1	New Jersey Devils (1985–86)	34–25–10
70	L	March 16, 1986	1–3	@ New York Rangers (1985–86)	34–26–10
71	W	March 18, 1986	6–2	New York Rangers (1985–86)	35–26–10
72	W	March 20, 1986	7–1	@ Toronto Maple Leafs (1985–86)	36–26–10
73	T	March 22, 1986	3–3 OT	@ Boston Bruins (1985–86)	36–26–11
74	L	March 25, 1986	0–2	St. Louis Blues (1985–86)	36–27–11
75	W	March 28, 1986	4–3	@ Washington Capitals (1985–86)	37–27–11
76	T	March 29, 1986	4–4 OT	Edmonton Oilers (1985–86)	37–27–12

April

Game	Result	Date	Score	Opponent	Record
77	L	April 1, 1986	2–4	@ Philadelphia Flyers (1985–86)	37–28–12
78	W	April 2, 1986	7–2	@ Pittsburgh Penguins (1985–86)	38–28–12
79	W	April 5, 1986	7–1	New Jersey Devils (1985–86)	39–28–12
80	L	April 6, 1986	7–9	@ New Jersey Devils (1985–86)	39–29–12

Legend: Win (2 points) Loss (0 points) Tie (1 point)

== Playoffs ==
The Islanders lost in their best-of-five series in the first round to the Washington Capitals.

Round 1: New York Islanders (3) vs. Washington Capitals (2)

Game 1- Islanders 1, Capitals 3

Game 2- Islanders 2, Capitals 5

Game 3- Capitals 3, Islanders 1

Washington wins series 3-0

== Player statistics ==
Regular season
Scoring

Player	Pos	GP	G	A	Pts	PIM	+/-	PPG	SHG	GWG
Mike Bossy	RW	80	61	62	123	14	30	21	1	9
Bryan Trottier	C	78	37	59	96	72	29	5	1	3
John Tonelli	LW	65	20	41	61	50	22	3	0	1
Denis Potvin	D	74	21	38	59	78	34	8	1	4
Brent Sutter	C	61	24	31	55	74	11	10	0	2
Pat LaFontaine	C	65	30	23	53	43	16	2	0	4
Duane Sutter	RW	80	20	33	53	157	15	4	0	1
Pat Flatley	RW	73	18	34	52	66	20	6	0	2
Tomas Jonsson	D	77	14	30	44	62	16	5	1	1
Mikko Makela	RW	58	16	20	36	28	12	2	0	3
Paul Boutilier	D	77	4	30	34	100	-5	0	0	0
Bob Bourne	C	62	17	15	32	36	-7	2	0	5
Greg Gilbert	LW	60	9	19	28	82	5	1	0	2
Stefan Persson	D	56	1	19	20	40	-3	1	0	0
Mark Hamway	RW	49	5	12	17	9	-5	1	0	1
Richard Kromm	LW	14	7	7	14	4	8	0	0	0
Clark Gillies	LW	55	4	10	14	55	-8	1	0	0
Randy Boyd	D	55	2	12	14	79	9	0	0	0
Roger Kortko	C	52	5	8	13	19	-11	0	0	1
Ken Morrow	D	69	0	12	12	22	24	0	0	0
Gord Dineen	D	57	1	8	9	81	15	0	0	0
Neal Coulter	RW	16	3	4	7	4	-1	0	0	0
Ari Haanpaa	LW	18	0	7	7	20	0	0	0	0
Steve Konroyd	D	14	0	5	5	16	4	0	0	0
Dale Henry	LW	7	1	3	4	15	0	0	0	0
Bob Bassen	C	11	2	1	3	6	0	0	0	0
Gerald Diduck	D	10	1	2	3	2	5	0	0	0
Scott Howson	C	10	1	2	3	2	2	0	0	0
Kelly Hrudey	G	45	0	3	3	14	0	0	0	0
Billy Smith	G	41	0	3	3	49	0	0	0	0
Ken Leiter	D	9	1	1	2	6	1	0	0	0
Bob Nystrom	RW	14	1	1	2	16	-4	1	0	0
Brad Dalgarno	RW	2	1	0	1	0	1	0	0	0
Alan Kerr	RW	7	0	1	1	16	1	0	0	0
Glenn Johannesen	LW	2	0	0	0	0	-1	0	0	0

Goaltending

Player	MIN	GP	W	L	T	GA	GAA	SO	SA	SV	SV%
Billy Smith	2308	41	20	14	4	143	3.72	1	1204	1061	.881
Kelly Hrudey	2563	45	19	15	8	137	3.21	1	1455	1318	.906
Team:	4871	80	39	29	12	280	3.45	2	2659	2379	.895

Playoffs
Scoring

Player	Pos	GP	G	A	Pts	PIM	+/-	PPG	SHG	GWG
Mike Bossy	RW	3	1	2	3	4	-2	0	0	0
Bryan Trottier	C	3	1	1	2	2	-1	0	0	0
Clark Gillies	LW	3	1	0	1	6	-2	0	0	0
Pat LaFontaine	C	3	1	0	1	0	-2	1	0	0
Bob Bassen	C	3	0	1	1	0	-1	0	0	0
Tomas Jonsson	D	3	0	1	1	4	-2	0	0	0
Richard Kromm	LW	3	0	1	1	0	0	0	0	0
Denis Potvin	D	3	0	1	1	0	-2	0	0	0
Brent Sutter	C	3	0	1	1	2	-3	0	0	0
Bob Bourne	C	3	0	0	0	0	-2	0	0	0
Paul Boutilier	D	3	0	0	0	2	-2	0	0	0
Randy Boyd	D	3	0	0	0	2	-1	0	0	0
Gord Dineen	D	3	0	0	0	2	-1	0	0	0
Pat Flatley	RW	3	0	0	0	21	-2	0	0	0
Greg Gilbert	LW	2	0	0	0	9	-1	0	0	0
Mark Hamway	RW	1	0	0	0	0	0	0	0	0
Kelly Hrudey	G	2	0	0	0	4	0	0	0	0
Alan Kerr	RW	1	0	0	0	0	0	0	0	0
Steve Konroyd	D	3	0	0	0	6	-1	0	0	0
Ken Morrow	D	2	0	0	0	4	-2	0	0	0
Billy Smith	G	1	0	0	0	0	0	0	0	0
Duane Sutter	RW	3	0	0	0	16	1	0	0	0

Goaltending

Player	MIN	GP	W	L	GA	GAA	SO	SA	SV	SV%
Kelly Hrudey	120	2	0	2	6	3.00	0	59	53	.898
Billy Smith	60	1	0	1	4	4.00	0	34	30	.882
Team:	180	3	0	3	10	3.33	0	93	83	.892

Note: Pos = Position; GP = Games played; G = Goals; A = Assists; Pts = Points; +/- = plus/minus; PIM = Penalty minutes; PPG = Power-play goals; SHG = Short-handed goals; GWG = Game-winning goals
MIN = Minutes played; W = Wins; L = Losses; T = Ties; GA = Goals-against; GAA = Goals-against average; SO = Shutouts; SA = Shots against; SV = Shots saved; SV% = Save percentage;

== Draft picks ==
New York's draft picks at the 1985 NHL entry draft held at the Metro Toronto Convention Centre in Toronto, Ontario.

Round	#	Player	Nationality	College/Junior/Club team (League)
1	6	Brad Dalgarno	Canada	Hamilton Steelhawks (OHL)
1	13	Derek King	Canada	Sault Ste. Marie Greyhounds (OHL)
2	34	Brad Lauer	Canada	Regina Pats (WHL)
3	55	Jeff Finley	Canada	Portland Winter Hawks (WHL)
4	76	Kevin Herom	Canada	Moose Jaw Warriors (WHL)
5	89	Tommy Hedlund	Sweden	AIK IF (Sweden)
5	97	Jeff Sveen	Canada	Boston University (Hockey East)
6	118	Rod Dallman	Canada	Prince Albert Raiders (WHL)
7	139	Kurt Lackten	Canada	Moose Jaw Warriors (WHL)
8	160	Hank Lammens	Canada	St. Lawrence University (ECAC)
9	181	Rich Wiest	Canada	Lethbridge Broncos (WHL)
10	202	Real Arsenault	Canada	Prince Andrew Secondary School (Canadian HS-NS)
11	223	Mike Volpe	Canada	Halifax Lions (MTJHL)
12	244	Tony Grenier	Canada	Prince Albert Raiders (WHL)

== See also ==
- 1985–86 NHL season
