= 1985–86 Minnesota North Stars season =

National Hockey League team season

1985–86 Minnesota North Stars
- Division: 2nd Norris
- Conference: 4th Campbell
- 1985–86 record: 38–33–9
- Home record: 21–15–4
- Road record: 17–18–5
- Goals for: 327
- Goals against: 305

Team information
- General manager: Lou Nanne
- Coach: Lorne Henning
- Captain: Craig Hartsburg
- Arena: Met Center

Team leaders
- Goals: Dino Ciccarelli (44)
- Assists: Neal Broten (76)
- Points: Neal Broten (105)
- Penalty minutes: Willi Plett (231)
- Wins: Don Beaupre (25)
- Goals against average: Don Beaupre (3.57)

The 1985–86 Minnesota North Stars season was the North Stars' 19th season.

Coached by Lorne Henning, the team compiled a record of 38–33–9 for 85 points, to finish the regular season 2nd in the Norris Division. In the playoffs they lost the division semi-finals 3–2 to the St. Louis Blues.

== Regular season ==
=== Final standings ===
Norris Division
	GP	W	L	T	GF	GA	Pts
**Chicago Black Hawks**	80	39	33	8	351	349	86
**Minnesota North Stars**	80	38	33	9	327	305	85
**St. Louis Blues**	80	37	34	9	302	291	83
**Toronto Maple Leafs**	80	25	48	7	311	386	57
Detroit Red Wings	80	17	57	6	266	415	40

Note: GP = Games played, W = Wins, L = Losses, T = Ties, Pts = Points, GF = Goals for, GA = Goals against
Note: Teams that qualified for the playoffs are highlighted in bold.

=== Record vs. opponents ===
Norris Division record vs. opponents

==== Vs. Campbell Conference ====
**Vs. Norris Division**

1985–86 NHL records
Team	**CHI**	**DET**	**MIN**	**STL**	**TOR**	**Total**
Chicago	—	6−2	3−3−2	5−3	2−6	**16−14−2**
Detroit	2−6	—	1−6−1	2−5−1	3−4−1	**8−21−3**
Minnesota	3−3−2	6−1−1	—	4−3−1	7−0−1	**20−7−5**
St. Louis	3−5	5−2−1	3−4−1	—	3−3−2	**14−14−4**
Toronto	6−2	4−3−1	0−7−1	3−3−2	—	**13−15−4**

**Vs. Smythe Division**

1985–86 NHL records
Team	**CGY**	**EDM**	**LAK**	**VAN**	**WIN**	**Total**
Chicago	2−1	0−3	1−0−2	3−0	2−1	**8−5−2**
Detroit	0−2−1	0−3	2−1	0−3	0−3	**2−12−1**
Minnesota	2−0−1	1−2	1−2	1−2	1−2	**6−8−1**
St. Louis	2−1	1−1−1	1−1−1	3−0	2−1	**9−4−2**
Toronto	1−2	1−2	1−2	0−2−1	1−1−1	**4−9−2**

**Vs. Wales Conference**

**Vs. Adams Division**

1985–86 NHL records
Team	**BOS**	**BUF**	**HFD**	**MTL**	**QUE**	**Total**
Chicago	2−1	2−1	2−1	0−2−1	1−2	**7−7−1**
Detroit	1−2	1−1−1	1−2	0−3	1−2	**4−10−1**
Minnesota	0−3	1−2	2−1	1−1−1	1−2	**5−9−1**
St. Louis	2−1	1−2	1−1−1	2−1	2−1	**8−6−1**
Toronto	0−2−1	2−1	0−3	1−2	0−3	**3−11−1**

**Vs. Patrick Division**

1985–86 NHL records
Team	**NJD**	**NYI**	**NYR**	**PHI**	**PIT**	**WSH**	**Total**
Chicago	1−2	2−0−1	3−0	0−2−1	1−1−1	1−2	**8−7−3**
Detroit	0−2−1	0−3	0−3	1−2	1−2	1−2	**3−14−1**
Minnesota	2−1	2−0−1	2−1	0−2−1	0−3	1−2	**7−9−2**
St. Louis	2−1	1−1−1	1−1−1	1−2	1−2	0−3	**6−10−2**
Toronto	2−1	0−3	1−2	1−2	0−3	1−2	**5−13−0**

== Schedule and results ==
1985–86 regular season
October

Game	Result	Date	Score	Opponent	Record
1	T	October 10, 1985	6–6 OT	@ Detroit Red Wings (1985–86)	0–0–1
2	L	October 12, 1985	2–6	Buffalo Sabres (1985–86)	0–1–1
3	L	October 15, 1985	2–3	@ Pittsburgh Penguins (1985–86)	0–2–1
4	W	October 17, 1985	10–1	Detroit Red Wings (1985–86)	1–2–1
5	L	October 19, 1985	3–7	@ Philadelphia Flyers (1985–86)	1–3–1
6	W	October 22, 1985	5–4	St. Louis Blues (1985–86)	2–3–1
7	T	October 23, 1985	4–4 OT	@ St. Louis Blues (1985–86)	2–3–2
8	W	October 26, 1985	7–5	@ Toronto Maple Leafs (1985–86)	3–3–2
9	L	October 27, 1985	2–3	@ Buffalo Sabres (1985–86)	3–4–2
10	L	October 30, 1985	5–6	Chicago Black Hawks (1985–86)	3–5–2

November

Game	Result	Date	Score	Opponent	Record
11	L	November 2, 1985	1–3	Winnipeg Jets (1985–86)	3–6–2
12	T	November 6, 1985	3–3 OT	Montreal Canadiens (1985–86)	3–6–3
13	W	November 9, 1985	4–3 OT	New York Rangers (1985–86)	4–6–3
14	L	November 10, 1985	1–2	@ Boston Bruins (1985–86)	4–7–3
15	L	November 13, 1985	2–5	@ Hartford Whalers (1985–86)	4–8–3
16	L	November 16, 1985	2–4	Detroit Red Wings (1985–86)	4–9–3
17	T	November 17, 1985	5–5 OT	@ Chicago Black Hawks (1985–86)	4–9–4
18	T	November 19, 1985	3–3 OT	@ Calgary Flames (1985–86)	4–9–5
19	L	November 21, 1985	2–4	St. Louis Blues (1985–86)	4–10–5
20	W	November 23, 1985	4–2	Los Angeles Kings (1985–86)	5–10–5
21	W	November 25, 1985	4–3	@ Buffalo Sabres (1985–86)	6–10–5
22	T	November 27, 1985	4–4 OT	New York Islanders (1985–86)	6–10–6
23	L	November 29, 1985	1–4	Philadelphia Flyers (1985–86)	6–11–6
24	L	November 30, 1985	3–4	@ St. Louis Blues (1985–86)	6–12–6

December

Game	Result	Date	Score	Opponent	Record
25	W	December 3, 1985	9–2	Chicago Black Hawks (1985–86)	7–12–6
26	L	December 7, 1985	4–8	@ Edmonton Oilers (1985–86)	7–13–6
27	L	December 9, 1985	4–6	New Jersey Devils (1985–86)	7–14–6
28	W	December 11, 1985	10–2	@ Detroit Red Wings (1985–86)	8–14–6
29	T	December 14, 1985	6–6 OT	Toronto Maple Leafs (1985–86)	8–14–7
30	W	December 17, 1985	6–3	Detroit Red Wings (1985–86)	9–14–7
31	L	December 19, 1985	3–4 OT	Pittsburgh Penguins (1985–86)	9–15–7
32	L	December 21, 1985	2–5	@ Boston Bruins (1985–86)	9–16–7
33	W	December 22, 1985	8–3	@ New Jersey Devils (1985–86)	10–16–7
34	W	December 26, 1985	6–5	@ Winnipeg Jets (1985–86)	11–16–7
35	W	December 28, 1985	3–1	New York Rangers (1985–86)	12–16–7
36	W	December 31, 1985	6–3	Calgary Flames (1985–86)	13–16–7

January

Game	Result	Date	Score	Opponent	Record
37	W	January 2, 1986	3–2	Vancouver Canucks (1985–86)	14–16–7
38	L	January 5, 1986	2–6	@ Chicago Black Hawks (1985–86)	14–17–7
39	W	January 7, 1986	3–2	@ New York Islanders (1985–86)	15–17–7
40	L	January 10, 1986	3–4	Los Angeles Kings (1985–86)	15–18–7
41	W	January 11, 1986	5–3	Washington Capitals (1985–86)	16–18–7
42	T	January 14, 1986	3–3 OT	Chicago Black Hawks (1985–86)	16–18–8
43	W	January 16, 1986	4–3	St. Louis Blues (1985–86)	17–18–8
44	W	January 18, 1986	5–2	@ Toronto Maple Leafs (1985–86)	18–18–8
45	L	January 19, 1986	2–3	@ Pittsburgh Penguins (1985–86)	18–19–8
46	L	January 21, 1986	5–7	@ Washington Capitals (1985–86)	18–20–8
47	L	January 23, 1986	2–5	Montreal Canadiens (1985–86)	18–21–8
48	L	January 25, 1986	3–6	Washington Capitals (1985–86)	18–22–8
49	W	January 27, 1986	6–2	New Jersey Devils (1985–86)	19–22–8
50	L	January 29, 1986	3–4	@ Los Angeles Kings (1985–86)	19–23–8
51	L	January 31, 1986	5–10	@ Vancouver Canucks (1985–86)	19–24–8

February

Game	Result	Date	Score	Opponent	Record
52	W	February 6, 1986	8–7 OT	Toronto Maple Leafs (1985–86)	20–24–8
53	T	February 8, 1986	3–3 OT	@ Philadelphia Flyers (1985–86)	20–24–9
54	W	February 10, 1986	4–3 OT	@ Montreal Canadiens (1985–86)	21–24–9
55	W	February 11, 1986	4–2	@ Toronto Maple Leafs (1985–86)	22–24–9
56	L	February 13, 1986	3–5	@ St. Louis Blues (1985–86)	22–25–9
57	W	February 15, 1986	4–1	Hartford Whalers (1985–86)	23–25–9
58	L	February 16, 1986	3–5	Boston Bruins (1985–86)	23–26–9
59	W	February 19, 1986	6–5	@ Chicago Black Hawks (1985–86)	24–26–9
60	W	February 21, 1986	5–2	Quebec Nordiques (1985–86)	25–26–9
61	W	February 23, 1986	4–3	Toronto Maple Leafs (1985–86)	26–26–9
62	L	February 24, 1986	1–5	@ New York Rangers (1985–86)	26–27–9
63	W	February 26, 1986	5–2	@ Hartford Whalers (1985–86)	27–27–9

March

Game	Result	Date	Score	Opponent	Record
64	W	March 1, 1986	5–4	New York Islanders (1985–86)	28–27–9
65	W	March 3, 1986	8–5	@ Detroit Red Wings (1985–86)	29–27–9
66	W	March 5, 1986	5–3	Toronto Maple Leafs (1985–86)	30–27–9
67	L	March 8, 1986	2–4	Winnipeg Jets (1985–86)	30–28–9
68	W	March 11, 1986	4–0	Edmonton Oilers (1985–86)	31–28–9
69	W	March 13, 1986	3–2	@ St. Louis Blues (1985–86)	32–28–9
70	L	March 15, 1986	2–3	@ Quebec Nordiques (1985–86)	32–29–9
71	W	March 17, 1986	6–5 OT	St. Louis Blues (1985–86)	33–29–9
72	W	March 19, 1986	6–5	@ Calgary Flames (1985–86)	34–29–9
73	L	March 21, 1986	4–5 OT	@ Edmonton Oilers (1985–86)	34–30–9
74	L	March 22, 1986	2–6	@ Vancouver Canucks (1985–86)	34–31–9
75	L	March 24, 1986	0–1	Quebec Nordiques (1985–86)	34–32–9
76	W	March 26, 1986	6–1	@ Toronto Maple Leafs (1985–86)	35–32–9
77	W	March 29, 1986	5–4	@ Detroit Red Wings (1985–86)	36–32–9

April

Game	Result	Date	Score	Opponent	Record
78	L	April 1, 1986	1–2	Chicago Black Hawks (1985–86)	36–33–9
79	W	April 2, 1986	7–5	@ Chicago Black Hawks (1985–86)	37–33–9
80	W	April 5, 1986	5–3	Detroit Red Wings (1985–86)	38–33–9

Legend: Win (2 points) Loss (0 points) Tie (1 point)

== Draft picks ==
Minnesota's draft picks at the 1985 NHL entry draft held at the Metro Toronto Convention Centre in Toronto, Ontario.

Round	#	Player	Nationality	College/Junior/Club team (League)
3	51	Stephane Roy	Canada	Granby Bisons (QMJHL)
4	69	Mike Berger	Canada	Lethbridge Broncos (WHL)
5	90	Dwight Mullins	Canada	Lethbridge Broncos (WHL)
6	111	Mike Mullowney	United States	Deerfield Academy (USHS-MA)
7	132	Mike Kelfer	United States	St. John's School (USHS-MA)
8	153	Ross Johnson	Canada	Rochester Mayo High School (USHS-MA)
9	174	Tim Helmer	Canada	Ottawa 67's (OHL)
10	195	Gordie Ernst	United States	Cranston East High School (USHS-RI)
11	216	Ladislav Lubina	Czechoslovakia	LTC Pardubice (Czechoslovakia)
12	237	Tommy Sjödin	Sweden	Timra IK (Sweden)

== See also ==
- 1985–86 NHL season
