= 1985–86 Vancouver Canucks season =

16th season in franchise history

1985–86 Vancouver Canucks
- Division: 4th Smythe
- Conference: 8th Campbell
- 1985–86 record: 23–44–13
- Home record: 17–18–5
- Road record: 6–26–8
- Goals for: 282
- Goals against: 333

Team information
- General manager: Jack Gordon
- Coach: Tom Watt
- Captain: Stan Smyl
- Alternate captains: Doug Halward; Rick Lanz; Doug Lidster
- Arena: Pacific Coliseum
- Average attendance: 10,446

Team leaders
- Goals: Tony Tanti (39)
- Assists: Patrik Sundstrom (48)
- Points: Petri Skriko (78)
- Penalty minutes: Garth Butcher (188)
- Wins: Richard Brodeur (19)
- Goals against average: Wendell Young (3.58)

The 1985–86 Vancouver Canucks season was the team's 16th in the National Hockey League (NHL).

== Off-season ==
Changes were the order of the day after a disastrous 1984–85 campaign. Gone were vice-president, general manager, and head coach Harry Neale and Associate Coach Ron Smith. Assistant GM Jack Gordon was promoted to GM and Director of Hockey Operations and 1982 Jack Adams Trophy winner Tom Watt was brought in to coach. The team would undergo a cosmetic change as well, altering their jerseys so that the big "V" on the front was replaced by the team logo, while smaller "V"s appeared on the shoulders.

In the entry draft, the Canucks took 6'3" right-winger Jim Sandlak with the fourth overall pick. He would play 23 games for the team in the season, collecting four points.

== Regular season ==
Stan Smyl became the first Canuck to reach the 200-goal plateau on November 22 in a 6–5 loss to New Jersey. Richard Brodeur would earn team MVP honours, appearing in a career-high 64 games and keeping the Canucks in many games they had no business being in. On February 28, he registered his 100th win as a Canuck in a 3-1 decision over Philadelphia. Sophomore Petri Skriko earned career high marks in goals (38) and points (78). His point total led the team but he trailed Tony Tanti by one in the goal department.

Otherwise, the only thing to keep fan interest was the three-way turtle derby between the Canucks, Jets, and Kings for the final two playoff spots in the Smythe Division, since the Oilers and Flames were well ahead of them and had already locked up the top two spots in the division. After a dreadful 20-game stretch in which they went 1-13-6 to drop to 20th overall in the NHL (ahead of only a woeful Detroit squad), the Canucks went 5-4-1 in their last ten to finish tied with Winnipeg for third place in the Smythe with 59 points, while Los Angeles was out with 54. But since the Jets had more wins than the Canucks (26 to 23), Vancouver lost the tiebreaker and claimed fourth place in the Smythe, which meant a first round matchup with the two time defending Stanley Cup champion and Presidents Trophy winning Edmonton Oilers.

=== Final standings ===
Smythe Division
	GP	W	L	T	GF	GA	Pts
**Edmonton Oilers**	80	56	17	7	426	310	119
**Calgary Flames**	80	40	31	9	354	315	89
**Winnipeg Jets**	80	26	47	7	295	372	59
**Vancouver Canucks**	80	23	44	13	282	333	59
Los Angeles Kings	80	23	49	8	284	389	54

Note: GP = Games played, W = Wins, L = Losses, T = Ties, Pts = Points, GF = Goals for, GA = Goals against
Note: Teams that qualified for the playoffs are highlighted in bold.

=== Record vs. opponents ===
Smythe Division record vs. opponents

==== Vs. Campbell Conference ====
**Vs. Smythe Division**

1985–86 NHL records
Team	**CGY**	**EDM**	**LAK**	**VAN**	**WIN**	**Total**
Calgary	—	1−6−1	7−1	4−2−2	6−1−1	**18−10−4**
Edmonton	6−1−1	—	6−0−2	7−0−1	6−2	**25−3−4**
Los Angeles	1−7	0−6−2	—	1−5−2	5−2−1	**7−20−5**
Vancouver	2−4−2	0−7−1	5−1−2	—	3−3−2	**10−15−7**
Winnipeg	1−6−1	2−6	2−5−1	3−3−2	—	**8−20−4**

**Vs. Norris Division**

1985–86 NHL records
Team	**CHI**	**DET**	**MIN**	**STL**	**TOR**	**Total**
Calgary	1−2	2−0−1	0−2−1	1−2	2−1	**6−7−2**
Edmonton	3−0	3−0	2−1	1−1−1	2−1	**11−3−1**
Los Angeles	0−1−2	1−2	2−1	1−1−1	2−1	**6−6−3**
Vancouver	0−3	3−0	2−1	0−3	2−0−1	**7−7−1**
Winnipeg	1−2	3−0	2−1	1−2	1−1−1	**8−6−1**

**Vs. Wales Conference**

**Vs. Adams Division**

1985–86 NHL records
Team	**BOS**	**BUF**	**HFD**	**MTL**	**QUE**	**Total**
Calgary	1−2	1−1−1	1−2	1−2	1−2	**5−9−1**
Edmonton	2−1	1−2	3−0	3−0	2−1	**11−4−0**
Los Angeles	0−3	2−1	1−2	1−2	1−2	**5−10−0**
Vancouver	0−1−2	1−2	0−3	0−3	1−1−1	**2−10−3**
Winnipeg	0−3	1−2	1−2	1−2	2−1	**5−10−0**

**Vs. Patrick Division**

1985–86 NHL records
Team	**NJD**	**NYI**	**NYR**	**PHI**	**PIT**	**WSH**	**Total**
Calgary	2−0−1	1−1−1	2−1	1−2	2−1	3−0	**11−5−2**
Edmonton	3−0	1−0−2	1−2	2−1	2−1	0−3	**9−7−2**
Los Angeles	1−2	1−2	1−2	0−3	1−2	1−2	**5−13−0**
Vancouver	1−2	1−1−1	0−3	1−2	1−2	0−2−1	**4−12−2**
Winnipeg	1−2	0−2−1	1−2	1−2	1−2	1−1−1	**5−11−2**

== Schedule and results ==
1985–86 regular season
October

Game	Result	Date	Score	Opponent	Record
1	W	October 10, 1985	6–5	@ Los Angeles Kings (1985–86)	1–0–0
2	L	October 12, 1985	3–4	St. Louis Blues (1985–86)	1–1–0
3	W	October 14, 1985	4–2	New York Islanders (1985–86)	2–1–0
4	T	October 16, 1985	3–3 OT	Boston Bruins (1985–86)	2–1–1
5	W	October 18, 1985	5–4	Los Angeles Kings (1985–86)	3–1–1
6	L	October 20, 1985	3–4	@ New York Rangers (1985–86)	3–2–1
7	T	October 22, 1985	2–2 OT	@ New York Islanders (1985–86)	3–2–2
8	W	October 23, 1985	5–0	@ Detroit Red Wings (1985–86)	4–2–2
9	L	October 25, 1985	4–5	@ Buffalo Sabres (1985–86)	4–3–2
10	L	October 27, 1985	4–7	@ Philadelphia Flyers (1985–86)	4–4–2
11	W	October 30, 1985	5–3	Toronto Maple Leafs (1985–86)	5–4–2

November

Game	Result	Date	Score	Opponent	Record
12	W	November 2, 1985	6–2	Buffalo Sabres (1985–86)	6–4–2
13	L	November 5, 1985	4–6	Edmonton Oilers (1985–86)	6–5–2
14	L	November 8, 1985	0–13	@ Edmonton Oilers (1985–86)	6–6–2
15	W	November 9, 1985	7–2	@ Winnipeg Jets (1985–86)	7–6–2
16	W	November 11, 1985	5–0	Detroit Red Wings (1985–86)	8–6–2
17	L	November 13, 1985	3–6	Pittsburgh Penguins (1985–86)	8–7–2
18	L	November 15, 1985	3–5	@ Washington Capitals (1985–86)	8–8–2
19	L	November 16, 1985	5–6 OT	@ St. Louis Blues (1985–86)	8–9–2
20	W	November 19, 1985	7–5	@ Detroit Red Wings (1985–86)	9–9–2
21	L	November 20, 1985	0–2	@ Chicago Black Hawks (1985–86)	9–10–2
22	L	November 22, 1985	5–6	New Jersey Devils (1985–86)	9–11–2
23	L	November 26, 1985	3–5	Chicago Black Hawks (1985–86)	9–12–2
24	T	November 27, 1985	5–5 OT	@ Edmonton Oilers (1985–86)	9–12–3
25	L	November 29, 1985	4–5	Hartford Whalers (1985–86)	9–13–3

December

Game	Result	Date	Score	Opponent	Record
26	L	December 2, 1985	0–7	@ Montreal Canadiens (1985–86)	9–14–3
27	L	December 4, 1985	4–5	@ Quebec Nordiques (1985–86)	9–15–3
28	L	December 6, 1985	1–4	@ New Jersey Devils (1985–86)	9–16–3
29	L	December 7, 1985	1–2	@ Washington Capitals (1985–86)	9–17–3
30	L	December 11, 1985	3–6	Winnipeg Jets (1985–86)	9–18–3
31	W	December 14, 1985	4–3	Calgary Flames (1985–86)	10–18–3
32	L	December 15, 1985	3–5	@ Edmonton Oilers (1985–86)	10–19–3
33	T	December 17, 1985	4–4 OT	Washington Capitals (1985–86)	10–19–4
34	W	December 20, 1985	5–3	Toronto Maple Leafs (1985–86)	11–19–4
35	W	December 21, 1985	6–2	@ Los Angeles Kings (1985–86)	12–19–4
36	W	December 23, 1985	5–3	Winnipeg Jets (1985–86)	13–19–4
37	L	December 27, 1985	1–6	Philadelphia Flyers (1985–86)	13–20–4
38	L	December 29, 1985	3–5	Edmonton Oilers (1985–86)	13–21–4

January

Game	Result	Date	Score	Opponent	Record
39	L	January 2, 1986	2–3	@ Minnesota North Stars (1985–86)	13–22–4
40	L	January 5, 1986	0–4	@ Winnipeg Jets (1985–86)	13–23–4
41	T	January 7, 1986	2–2 OT	@ Winnipeg Jets (1985–86)	13–23–5
42	L	January 9, 1986	4–5 OT	@ Calgary Flames (1985–86)	13–24–5
43	L	January 10, 1986	3–4	Hartford Whalers (1985–86)	13–25–5
44	L	January 14, 1986	1–2	New York Rangers (1985–86)	13–26–5
45	L	January 17, 1986	7–9	Los Angeles Kings (1985–86)	13–27–5
46	T	January 18, 1986	4–4 OT	@ Los Angeles Kings (1985–86)	13–27–6
47	W	January 21, 1986	5–3	New Jersey Devils (1985–86)	14–27–6
48	W	January 24, 1986	4–3	Pittsburgh Penguins (1985–86)	15–27–6
49	T	January 29, 1986	4–4 OT	Calgary Flames (1985–86)	15–27–7
50	W	January 31, 1986	10–5	Minnesota North Stars (1985–86)	16–27–7

February

Game	Result	Date	Score	Opponent	Record
51	W	February 7, 1986	5–2	Winnipeg Jets (1985–86)	17–27–7
52	T	February 9, 1986	3–3 OT	Winnipeg Jets (1985–86)	17–27–8
53	L	February 11, 1986	0–1	@ New York Islanders (1985–86)	17–28–8
54	L	February 12, 1986	2–5	@ New York Rangers (1985–86)	17–29–8
55	L	February 15, 1986	4–9	@ Pittsburgh Penguins (1985–86)	17–30–8
56	T	February 16, 1986	4–4 OT	@ Toronto Maple Leafs (1985–86)	17–30–9
57	L	February 18, 1986	4–5	@ Hartford Whalers (1985–86)	17–31–9
58	L	February 21, 1986	0–4	Calgary Flames (1985–86)	17–32–9
59	L	February 23, 1986	1–6	Boston Bruins (1985–86)	17–33–9
60	L	February 26, 1986	2–4	Montreal Canadiens (1985–86)	17–34–9
61	W	February 28, 1986	3–1	Philadelphia Flyers (1985–86)	18–34–9

March

Game	Result	Date	Score	Opponent	Record
62	L	March 1, 1986	2–3	@ Calgary Flames (1985–86)	18–35–9
63	L	March 4, 1986	2–6	Edmonton Oilers (1985–86)	18–36–9
64	T	March 6, 1986	5–5 OT	Los Angeles Kings (1985–86)	18–36–10
65	L	March 8, 1986	3–7	@ St. Louis Blues (1985–86)	18–37–10
66	T	March 11, 1986	1–1 OT	@ Quebec Nordiques (1985–86)	18–37–11
67	L	March 12, 1986	2–3	@ Montreal Canadiens (1985–86)	18–38–11
68	T	March 15, 1986	1–1 OT	@ Boston Bruins (1985–86)	18–38–12
69	L	March 16, 1986	4–5	@ Chicago Black Hawks (1985–86)	18–39–12
70	L	March 19, 1986	3–4	Buffalo Sabres (1985–86)	18–40–12
71	T	March 21, 1986	5–5 OT	@ Calgary Flames (1985–86)	18–40–13
72	W	March 22, 1986	6–2	Minnesota North Stars (1985–86)	19–40–13
73	L	March 24, 1986	4–8	@ Winnipeg Jets (1985–86)	19–41–13
74	W	March 26, 1986	7–6	Quebec Nordiques (1985–86)	20–41–13
75	W	March 28, 1986	2–1 OT	Los Angeles Kings (1985–86)	21–41–13
76	W	March 30, 1986	4–2	Calgary Flames (1985–86)	22–41–13

April

Game	Result	Date	Score	Opponent	Record
77	L	April 1, 1986	5–6	@ Calgary Flames (1985–86)	22–42–13
78	L	April 2, 1986	4–8	@ Edmonton Oilers (1985–86)	22–43–13
79	W	April 5, 1986	5–3	@ Los Angeles Kings (1985–86)	23–43–13
80	L	April 6, 1986	2–3	Edmonton Oilers (1985–86)	23–44–13

Legend: Win (2 points) Loss (0 points) Tie (1 point)

== Playoffs ==
The first-round series between the Edmonton Oilers and Vancouver Canucks was quick and painless. Edmonton annihilated Vancouver in Game One by a 7–3 score. They completed the much-expected sweep with a pair of easy 5-1 victories. In his autobiography, Wayne Gretzky would attribute the Oilers' second-round loss to Calgary to the fact that the victory over Vancouver was so easy that it did not seem like they were in the playoffs yet. The Vancouver fans did not help enhance the playoff atmosphere any, as 7,854 (many of whom were clad in blue and orange) showed up for Game Three. It was a worthy reflection of the condition to which the franchise had sunken.

== Draft picks ==
Vancouver's draft picks at the 1985 NHL entry draft held at the Metro Toronto Convention Centre in Toronto, Ontario.

Round	#	Player	Nationality	College/Junior/Club team (League)
1	4	Jim Sandlak	Canada	London Knights (OHL)
2	25	Troy Gamble	Canada	Medicine Hat Tigers (WHL)
3	46	Shane Doyle	Canada	Belleville Bulls (OHL)
4	67	Randy Siska	Canada	Medicine Hat Tigers (WHL)
5	88	Robert Kron	Czechoslovakia	Zetor Brno (Czechoslovakia)
6	109	Martin Hrstka	Czechoslovakia	Dukla Trenčín (Czechoslovakia)
7	130	Brian McFarlane	Canada	Seattle Breakers (WHL)
8	151	Hakan Ahlund	Sweden	Örebro IK (Sweden)
9	172	Curtis Hunt	Canada	Prince Albert Raiders (WHL)
10	193	Carl Valimont	United States	University of Massachusetts Lowell (Hockey East)
11	214	Igor Larionov	Soviet Union	CSKA Moscow (USSR)
12	235	Darren Taylor	Canada	Calgary Wranglers (WHL)

== See also ==
- 1985–86 NHL season
