= 1985–86 Buffalo Sabres season =

NHL hockey team season

1985–86 Buffalo Sabres
- Division: 5th Adams
- Conference: 8th Wales
- 1985–86 record: 37–37–6
- Home record: 23–16–1
- Road record: 14–21–5
- Goals for: 296
- Goals against: 291

Team information
- General manager: Scotty Bowman
- Coach: Jim Schoenfeld; Scotty Bowman
- Captain: Gilbert Perreault
- Alternate captains: Larry Playfair; Lindy Ruff
- Arena: Buffalo Memorial Auditorium

Team leaders
- Goals: Mike Foligno (41)
- Assists: Dave Andreychuk (51)
- Points: Dave Andreychuk (87)
- Penalty minutes: Mike Foligno (168)
- Plus/minus: Mike Foligno (+27)
- Wins: Tom Barrasso (29)
- Goals against average: Jacques Cloutier (3.37)

The 1985–86 Buffalo Sabres season was the 16th season for the franchise in the National Hockey League (NHL). It saw the Sabres finish in last place in the Adams Division with a record of 37 wins, 37 losses, and 6 ties for 80 points. They missed the Stanley Cup playoffs for the first time since 1974.

== Regular season ==
=== Divisional standings ===
Adams Division
	GP	W	L	T	GF	GA	Pts
**Quebec Nordiques**	80	43	31	6	330	289	92
**Montreal Canadiens**	80	40	33	7	330	280	87
**Boston Bruins**	80	37	31	12	311	288	86
**Hartford Whalers**	80	40	36	4	332	302	84
Buffalo Sabres	80	37	37	6	296	291	80

Note: GP = Games played, W = Wins, L = Losses, T = Ties, Pts = Points, GF = Goals for, GA = Goals against
Note: Teams that qualified for the playoffs are highlighted in bold.

=== Record vs. opponents ===
Adams Division record vs. opponents

==== Vs. Wales Conference ====
**Vs. Adams Division**

1985–86 NHL records
Team	**BOS**	**BUF**	**HFD**	**MTL**	**QUE**	**Total**
Boston	—	3–3–2	4–3–1	3–4–1	1–5–2	**11–15–6**
Buffalo	3–3–2	—	2–6	3–5	4–4	**12–18–2**
Hartford	3–4–1	6–2	—	3–4–1	4–4	**16–14–2**
Montreal	4–3–1	5–3	4–3−1	—	2–6	**15–15–2**
Quebec	5–1–2	4–4	4–4	6–2	—	**19–11–2**

**Vs. Patrick Division**

1985–86 NHL records
Team	**NJD**	**NYI**	**NYR**	**PHI**	**PIT**	**WSH**	**Total**
Boston	3–0	0–1–2	1–2	1–2	2–1	0–2–1	**7–8–3**
Buffalo	2–1	2–1	3–0	2–1	0–2–1	1–1–1	**10–6–2**
Hartford	2–1	1–2	2–1	0–3	2–1	0–2–1	**7–10–1**
Montreal	2–1	2–1	0–2–1	1–2	2–0–1	0–2–1	**7–8–3**
Quebec	1–2	2–1	2–0–1	1–1–1	1–1–1	0–3	**7–8–3**

==== Vs. Campbell Conference ====
**Vs. Norris Division**

1985–86 NHL records
Team	**CHI**	**DET**	**MIN**	**STL**	**TOR**	**Total**
Boston	1–2	2–1	3–0	1–2	2–0–1	**9–5–1**
Buffalo	1–2	1–1–1	2–1	2–1	1–2	**7–7–1**
Hartford	1–2	2–1	1–2	1–1–1	3–0	**8–6–1**
Montreal	2–0–1	3–0	1–1–1	1–2	2–1	**9–4–2**
Quebec	2–1	2–1	2–1	1–2	3–0	**10–5–0**

**Vs. Smythe Division**

1985–86 NHL records
Team	**CGY**	**EDM**	**LAK**	**VAN**	**WIN**	**Total**
Boston	2–1	1–2	3–0	1–0–2	3–0	**10–3–2**
Buffalo	1–1–1	2–1	1–2	2–1	2–1	**8–6–1**
Hartford	2–1	0–3	2–1	3–0	2–1	**9–6–0**
Montreal	2–1	0–3	2–1	3–0	2–1	**9–6–0**
Quebec	2–1	1–2	2–1	1–1–1	1–2	**7–7–1**

== Schedule and results ==
1985–86 regular season
October

Game	Result	Date	Score	Opponent	Record
1	L	October 10, 1985	4–5	Hartford Whalers (1985–86)	0–1–0
2	W	October 12, 1985	6–2	@ Minnesota North Stars (1985–86)	1–1–0
3	W	October 14, 1985	6–1	Detroit Red Wings (1985–86)	2–1–0
4	W	October 16, 1985	6–0	@ Montreal Canadiens (1985–86)	3–1–0
5	L	October 18, 1985	1–4	Washington Capitals (1985–86)	3–2–0
6	T	October 19, 1985	2–2 OT	@ Washington Capitals (1985–86)	3–2–1
7	L	October 23, 1985	4–5	Montreal Canadiens (1985–86)	3–3–1
8	W	October 25, 1985	5–4	Vancouver Canucks (1985–86)	4–3–1
9	W	October 27, 1985	3–2	Minnesota North Stars (1985–86)	5–3–1
10	L	October 30, 1985	2–4	@ Calgary Flames (1985–86)	5–4–1

November

Game	Result	Date	Score	Opponent	Record
11	W	November 1, 1985	2–0	@ Edmonton Oilers (1985–86)	6–4–1
12	L	November 2, 1985	2–6	@ Vancouver Canucks (1985–86)	6–5–1
13	W	November 6, 1985	7–3	Winnipeg Jets (1985–86)	7–5–1
14	W	November 8, 1985	5–4	St. Louis Blues (1985–86)	8–5–1
15	W	November 10, 1985	5–1	Calgary Flames (1985–86)	9–5–1
16	W	November 13, 1985	6–4	Boston Bruins (1985–86)	10–5–1
17	L	November 16, 1985	1–3	@ Quebec Nordiques (1985–86)	10–6–1
18	L	November 17, 1985	3–5	Toronto Maple Leafs (1985–86)	10–7–1
19	W	November 19, 1985	2–0	@ Hartford Whalers (1985–86)	11–7–1
20	W	November 22, 1985	7–5	Quebec Nordiques (1985–86)	12–7–1
21	L	November 25, 1985	3–4	Minnesota North Stars (1985–86)	12–8–1
22	L	November 27, 1985	1–4	@ Detroit Red Wings (1985–86)	12–9–1
23	L	November 29, 1985	2–5	Montreal Canadiens (1985–86)	12–10–1
24	L	November 30, 1985	2–3 OT	@ Toronto Maple Leafs (1985–86)	12–11–1

December

Game	Result	Date	Score	Opponent	Record
25	W	December 4, 1985	6–3	@ St. Louis Blues (1985–86)	13–11–1
26	L	December 6, 1985	1–3	Pittsburgh Penguins (1985–86)	13–12–1
27	T	December 8, 1985	3–3 OT	@ Boston Bruins (1985–86)	13–12–2
28	L	December 10, 1985	3–7	@ Quebec Nordiques (1985–86)	13–13–2
29	L	December 13, 1985	4–6	Hartford Whalers (1985–86)	13–14–2
30	W	December 15, 1985	6–2	Quebec Nordiques (1985–86)	14–14–2
31	L	December 17, 1985	3–7	@ New York Islanders (1985–86)	14–15–2
32	W	December 18, 1985	5–4	@ New York Rangers (1985–86)	15–15–2
33	L	December 21, 1985	1–3	@ Montreal Canadiens (1985–86)	15–16–2
34	W	December 22, 1985	5–3	Boston Bruins (1985–86)	16–16–2
35	W	December 26, 1985	6–1	New York Rangers (1985–86)	17–16–2
36	W	December 29, 1985	4–3	New York Islanders (1985–86)	18–16–2
37	T	December 31, 1985	6–6 OT	Boston Bruins (1985–86)	18–16–3

January

Game	Result	Date	Score	Opponent	Record
38	T	January 2, 1986	2–2 OT	@ Detroit Red Wings (1985–86)	18–16–4
39	L	January 4, 1986	0–4	@ Boston Bruins (1985–86)	18–17–4
40	L	January 5, 1986	2–3	Los Angeles Kings (1985–86)	18–18–4
41	W	January 10, 1986	9–7	Toronto Maple Leafs (1985–86)	19–18–4
42	T	January 11, 1986	3–3 OT	@ Pittsburgh Penguins (1985–86)	19–18–5
43	L	January 15, 1986	2–4	@ Chicago Black Hawks (1985–86)	19–19–5
44	W	January 17, 1986	5–4 OT	Montreal Canadiens (1985–86)	20–19–5
45	W	January 19, 1986	6–3	@ New Jersey Devils (1985–86)	21–19–5
46	W	January 22, 1986	6–3	Winnipeg Jets (1985–86)	22–19–5
47	L	January 24, 1986	3–5	Chicago Black Hawks (1985–86)	22–20–5
48	L	January 25, 1986	3–4	@ Quebec Nordiques (1985–86)	22–21–5
49	L	January 27, 1986	1–4	@ Montreal Canadiens (1985–86)	22–22–5
50	L	January 29, 1986	3–5	@ Winnipeg Jets (1985–86)	22–23–5
51	W	January 31, 1986	5–3	New York Rangers (1985–86)	23–23–5

February

Game	Result	Date	Score	Opponent	Record
52	W	February 2, 1986	5–3	Quebec Nordiques (1985–86)	24–23–5
53	W	February 6, 1986	8–6	@ Boston Bruins (1985–86)	25–23–5
54	W	February 8, 1986	4–2	@ Hartford Whalers (1985–86)	26–23–5
55	W	February 9, 1986	4–2	Edmonton Oilers (1985–86)	27–23–5
56	L	February 12, 1986	0–4	Philadelphia Flyers (1985–86)	27–24–5
57	T	February 14, 1986	3–3 OT	@ Calgary Flames (1985–86)	27–24–6
58	L	February 16, 1986	5–7	@ Edmonton Oilers (1985–86)	27–25–6
59	L	February 19, 1986	4–6	Hartford Whalers (1985–86)	27–26–6
60	W	February 21, 1986	5–1	New York Islanders (1985–86)	28–26–6
61	W	February 23, 1986	4–1	Washington Capitals (1985–86)	29–26–6
62	L	February 26, 1986	2–5	@ Pittsburgh Penguins (1985–86)	29–27–6
63	L	February 28, 1986	2–6	Quebec Nordiques (1985–86)	29–28–6

March

Game	Result	Date	Score	Opponent	Record
64	W	March 1, 1986	8–4	@ Quebec Nordiques (1985–86)	30–28–6
65	W	March 4, 1986	6–4	@ Philadelphia Flyers (1985–86)	31–28–6
66	L	March 5, 1986	1–5	@ Hartford Whalers (1985–86)	31–29–6
67	L	March 7, 1986	2–6	Hartford Whalers (1985–86)	31–30–6
68	W	March 9, 1986	4–3	New Jersey Devils (1985–86)	32–30–6
69	L	March 11, 1986	2–3 OT	@ St. Louis Blues (1985–86)	32–31–6
70	W	March 12, 1986	7–6	@ Chicago Black Hawks (1985–86)	33–31–6
71	L	March 15, 1986	3–5	@ Los Angeles Kings (1985–86)	33–32–6
72	W	March 19, 1986	4–3	@ Vancouver Canucks (1985–86)	34–32–6
73	L	March 21, 1986	3–6	New Jersey Devils (1985–86)	34–33–6
74	W	March 23, 1986	6–1	Los Angeles Kings (1985–86)	35–33–6
75	W	March 27, 1986	1–0	@ Philadelphia Flyers (1985–86)	36–33–6
76	L	March 29, 1986	1–2	@ Boston Bruins (1985–86)	36–34–6
77	L	March 30, 1986	3–5	Boston Bruins (1985–86)	36–35–6

April

Game	Result	Date	Score	Opponent	Record
78	L	April 1, 1986	3–5	@ Hartford Whalers (1985–86)	36–36–6
79	W	April 4, 1986	4–2	Montreal Canadiens (1985–86)	37–36–6
80	L	April 5, 1986	2–4	@ Montreal Canadiens (1985–86)	37–37–6

Legend: Win (2 points) Loss (0 points) Tie (1 point)

== Player statistics ==
=== Skaters ===
Note: GP = Games played; G = Goals; A = Assists; Pts = Points; +/- = Plus/minus; PIM = Penalty minutes

Player	GP	G	A	PTS	+/-	PIM
Dave Andreychuk	80	36	51	87		61
Mike Foligno	79	41	39	80		168
John Tucker	75	31	34	65		39
Phil Housley	79	15	47	62		54
Gilbert Perreault	72	21	39	60		28
Lindy Ruff	54	20	12	32		158
Mike Ramsey	76	7	21	28		117
Steve Dykstra	64	4	21	25		108
Bill Hajt	58	1	16	17		25
Normand Lacombe	25	6	7	13		13

=== Goaltenders ===
Note: GP = Games played; TOI = Time on ice (minutes); W = Wins; L = Losses; OT = Overtime losses; GA = Goals against; SO = Shutouts; SV% = Save percentage; GAA = Goals against average

Player	GP	TOI	W	L	OT	GA	SO	SV%	GAA

== Draft picks ==
Buffalo's picks at the 1985 NHL entry draft.

Round	Pick	Player	Position	Nationality	College
1	14	Calle Johansson	Defense	Sweden	Västra Frölunda HC (Sweden)
2	35	Benoit Hogue	Left wing	Canada	St. Jean Beavers (QMJHL)
3	56	Keith Gretzky	Forward	Canada	Windsor Spitfires (OHL)
4	77	Dave Moylan	Defense	Canada	Sudbury Wolves (OHL)
5	98	Ken Priestlay	Center	Canada	Victoria Cougars (WHL)
6	119	Joe Reekie	Defense	Canada	Cornwall Royals (OHL)
7	140	Petri Matikainen	Defense	Finland	SaPKO (Finland)
8	161	Trent Kaese	Right wing	Canada	Lethbridge Broncos (WHL)
9	182	Jiri Sejba	Forward	Czechoslovakia	Dukla Jihlava (Czechoslovakia)
10	203	Boyd Sutton	Center	United States	Stratford Cullitons (OPJHL)
11	224	Guy Larose	Center	Canada	Guelph Platers (OHL)
12	245	Ken Baumgartner	Left wing	Canada	Prince Albert Raiders (WHL)
