= 1985–86 Boston Bruins season =

NHL team season

1985–86 Boston Bruins
- Division: 3rd Adams
- Conference: 6th Wales
- 1985–86 record: 37–31–12
- Home record: 24–9–7
- Road record: 13–22–5
- Goals for: 311
- Goals against: 288

Team information
- General manager: Harry Sinden
- Coach: Butch Goring
- Captain: Ray Bourque; Rick Middleton
- Alternate captains: Barry Pederson
- Arena: Boston Garden

Team leaders
- Goals: Keith Crowder (38)
- Assists: Ken Linseman/Ray Bourque (58)
- Points: Keith Crowder (84)
- Penalty minutes: Nevin Markwart (207)
- Plus/minus: Barry Pederson (+19)
- Wins: Pat Riggin (17)
- Goals against average: Bill Ranford (2.50)

The 1985–86 Boston Bruins season was the Bruins' 62nd season.

== Offseason ==
Captain Terry O'Reilly retires. Forward Rick Middleton and defenseman Ray Bourque are named co-captains. Retiring as a player during the offseason, Butch Goring is named the 15th head coach in Boston Bruins history. Defenseman Mike Milbury also retires and is named assistant coach, but returns to active duty Feb. 11, 1986, due to a mounting injury list on the blueline. Despite missing over a month of the season with an MCL injury, Bruins left winger Charlie Simmer bounces back scoring 17 goals and 26 points in his first 20 games. The winger is sent to the sidelines yet again, however, after sufferings a right eye injury from a high stick by Gates Orlando of the Buffalo Sabres. The injury is so scary that it inspires several players on the team to wear visors.

== Regular season ==
=== Final standings ===
Adams Division
	GP	W	L	T	GF	GA	Pts
**Quebec Nordiques**	80	43	31	6	330	289	92
**Montreal Canadiens**	80	40	33	7	330	280	87
**Boston Bruins**	80	37	31	12	311	288	86
**Hartford Whalers**	80	40	36	4	332	302	84
Buffalo Sabres	80	37	37	6	296	291	80

Note: GP = Games played, W = Wins, L = Losses, T = Ties, Pts = Points, GF = Goals for, GA = Goals against
Note: Teams that qualified for the playoffs are highlighted in bold.

=== Record vs. opponents ===
Adams Division record vs. opponents

==== Vs. Wales Conference ====
**Vs. Adams Division**

1985–86 NHL records
Team	**BOS**	**BUF**	**HFD**	**MTL**	**QUE**	**Total**
Boston	—	3–3–2	4–3–1	3–4–1	1–5–2	**11–15–6**
Buffalo	3–3–2	—	2–6	3–5	4–4	**12–18–2**
Hartford	3–4–1	6–2	—	3–4–1	4–4	**16–14–2**
Montreal	4–3–1	5–3	4–3−1	—	2–6	**15–15–2**
Quebec	5–1–2	4–4	4–4	6–2	—	**19–11–2**

**Vs. Patrick Division**

1985–86 NHL records
Team	**NJD**	**NYI**	**NYR**	**PHI**	**PIT**	**WSH**	**Total**
Boston	3–0	0–1–2	1–2	1–2	2–1	0–2–1	**7–8–3**
Buffalo	2–1	2–1	3–0	2–1	0–2–1	1–1–1	**10–6–2**
Hartford	2–1	1–2	2–1	0–3	2–1	0–2–1	**7–10–1**
Montreal	2–1	2–1	0–2–1	1–2	2–0–1	0–2–1	**7–8–3**
Quebec	1–2	2–1	2–0–1	1–1–1	1–1–1	0–3	**7–8–3**

==== Vs. Campbell Conference ====
**Vs. Norris Division**

1985–86 NHL records
Team	**CHI**	**DET**	**MIN**	**STL**	**TOR**	**Total**
Boston	1–2	2–1	3–0	1–2	2–0–1	**9–5–1**
Buffalo	1–2	1–1–1	2–1	2–1	1–2	**7–7–1**
Hartford	1–2	2–1	1–2	1–1–1	3–0	**8–6–1**
Montreal	2–0–1	3–0	1–1–1	1–2	2–1	**9–4–2**
Quebec	2–1	2–1	2–1	1–2	3–0	**10–5–0**

**Vs. Smythe Division**

1985–86 NHL records
Team	**CGY**	**EDM**	**LAK**	**VAN**	**WIN**	**Total**
Boston	2–1	1–2	3–0	1–0–2	3–0	**10–3–2**
Buffalo	1–1–1	2–1	1–2	2–1	2–1	**8–6–1**
Hartford	2–1	0–3	2–1	3–0	2–1	**9–6–0**
Montreal	2–1	0–3	2–1	3–0	2–1	**9–6–0**
Quebec	2–1	1–2	2–1	1–1–1	1–2	**7–7–1**

== Schedule and results ==
1985–86 regular season
October

Game	Result	Date	Score	Opponent	Record
1	W	October 10, 1985	3–1	Toronto Maple Leafs (1985–86)	1–0–0
2	W	October 12, 1985	9–2	@ Detroit Red Wings (1985–86)	2–0–0
3	W	October 13, 1985	7–2	Montreal Canadiens (1985–86)	3–0–0
4	T	October 16, 1985	3–3 OT	@ Vancouver Canucks (1985–86)	3–0–1
5	L	October 18, 1985	2–3	@ Edmonton Oilers (1985–86)	3–1–1
6	W	October 19, 1985	6–3	@ Calgary Flames (1985–86)	4–1–1
7	W	October 22, 1985	5–2	@ Los Angeles Kings (1985–86)	5–1–1
8	L	October 27, 1985	1–2	@ New York Rangers (1985–86)	5–2–1
9	W	October 29, 1985	6–4	@ New Jersey Devils (1985–86)	6–2–1
10	W	October 31, 1985	7–4	Los Angeles Kings (1985–86)	7–2–1

November

Game	Result	Date	Score	Opponent	Record
11	W	November 2, 1985	5–4	Chicago Black Hawks (1985–86)	8–2–1
12	L	November 5, 1985	5–7	@ Quebec Nordiques (1985–86)	8–3–1
13	W	November 7, 1985	2–1	Hartford Whalers (1985–86)	9–3–1
14	L	November 9, 1985	3–5	@ Philadelphia Flyers (1985–86)	9–4–1
15	W	November 10, 1985	2–1	Minnesota North Stars (1985–86)	10–4–1
16	L	November 13, 1985	4–6	@ Buffalo Sabres (1985–86)	10–5–1
17	T	November 14, 1985	6–6 OT	@ Toronto Maple Leafs (1985–86)	10–5–2
18	T	November 16, 1985	2–2 OT	Washington Capitals (1985–86)	10–5–3
19	L	November 18, 1985	2–6	@ Montreal Canadiens (1985–86)	10–6–3
20	T	November 21, 1985	4–4 OT	New York Islanders (1985–86)	10–6–4
21	W	November 23, 1985	5–4	Philadelphia Flyers (1985–86)	11–6–4
22	L	November 28, 1985	0–3	Quebec Nordiques (1985–86)	11–7–4
23	L	November 30, 1985	0–2	@ Quebec Nordiques (1985–86)	11–8–4

December

Game	Result	Date	Score	Opponent	Record
24	W	December 1, 1985	4–2	New Jersey Devils (1985–86)	12–8–4
25	W	December 5, 1985	8–6	Montreal Canadiens (1985–86)	13–8–4
26	L	December 7, 1985	2–7	@ Hartford Whalers (1985–86)	13–9–4
27	T	December 8, 1985	3–3 OT	Buffalo Sabres (1985–86)	13–9–5
28	L	December 10, 1985	4–7	@ Philadelphia Flyers (1985–86)	13–10–5
29	T	December 12, 1985	1–1 OT	Quebec Nordiques (1985–86)	13–10–6
30	W	December 14, 1985	4–2	New York Rangers (1985–86)	14–10–6
31	W	December 19, 1985	2–1	Hartford Whalers (1985–86)	15–10–6
32	W	December 21, 1985	5–2	Minnesota North Stars (1985–86)	16–10–6
33	L	December 22, 1985	3–5	@ Buffalo Sabres (1985–86)	16–11–6
34	L	December 26, 1985	3–4	@ Pittsburgh Penguins (1985–86)	16–12–6
35	W	December 28, 1985	5–1	@ St. Louis Blues (1985–86)	17–12–6
36	L	December 29, 1985	3–4	@ Chicago Black Hawks (1985–86)	17–13–6
37	T	December 31, 1985	6–6 OT	@ Buffalo Sabres (1985–86)	17–13–7

January

Game	Result	Date	Score	Opponent	Record
38	L	January 2, 1986	5–7	@ New York Islanders (1985–86)	17–14–7
39	W	January 4, 1986	4–0	Buffalo Sabres (1985–86)	18–14–7
40	L	January 8, 1986	3–5	@ Montreal Canadiens (1985–86)	18–15–7
41	L	January 9, 1986	2–7	St. Louis Blues (1985–86)	18–16–7
42	W	January 11, 1986	8–4	Winnipeg Jets (1985–86)	19–16–7
43	L	January 13, 1986	3–5	Edmonton Oilers (1985–86)	19–17–7
44	W	January 16, 1986	3–2	Calgary Flames (1985–86)	20–17–7
45	W	January 19, 1986	2–1	@ Winnipeg Jets (1985–86)	21–17–7
46	L	January 22, 1986	5–6 OT	@ Detroit Red Wings (1985–86)	21–18–7
47	W	January 23, 1986	7–5	Winnipeg Jets (1985–86)	22–18–7
48	W	January 25, 1986	6–3	Detroit Red Wings (1985–86)	23–18–7
49	W	January 27, 1986	6–3	Hartford Whalers (1985–86)	24–18–7
50	W	January 29, 1986	5–4 OT	@ Hartford Whalers (1985–86)	25–18–7

February

Game	Result	Date	Score	Opponent	Record
51	L	February 1, 1986	1–2	@ Montreal Canadiens (1985–86)	25–19–7
52	W	February 2, 1986	3–2	Pittsburgh Penguins (1985–86)	26–19–7
53	L	February 6, 1986	6–8	Buffalo Sabres (1985–86)	26–20–7
54	L	February 8, 1986	2–3	New York Rangers (1985–86)	26–21–7
55	L	February 9, 1986	3–4 OT	Quebec Nordiques (1985–86)	26–22–7
56	L	February 11, 1986	4–5	@ Chicago Black Hawks (1985–86)	26–23–7
57	L	February 15, 1986	1–5	@ St. Louis Blues (1985–86)	26–24–7
58	W	February 16, 1986	5–3	@ Minnesota North Stars (1985–86)	27–24–7
59	L	February 18, 1986	4–7	@ Calgary Flames (1985–86)	27–25–7
60	W	February 22, 1986	6–5 OT	@ Edmonton Oilers (1985–86)	28–25–7
61	W	February 23, 1986	6–1	@ Vancouver Canucks (1985–86)	29–25–7
62	W	February 25, 1986	7–4	@ Quebec Nordiques (1985–86)	30–25–7
63	L	February 27, 1986	1–2	Washington Capitals (1985–86)	30–26–7

March

Game	Result	Date	Score	Opponent	Record
64	W	March 1, 1986	8–3	New Jersey Devils (1985–86)	31–26–7
65	L	March 2, 1986	1–4	@ Hartford Whalers (1985–86)	31–27–7
66	L	March 6, 1986	4–5 OT	Quebec Nordiques (1985–86)	31–28–7
67	L	March 8, 1986	3–8	@ Montreal Canadiens (1985–86)	31–29–7
68	W	March 12, 1986	5–2	@ Pittsburgh Penguins (1985–86)	32–29–7
69	W	March 13, 1986	3–2	Montreal Canadiens (1985–86)	33–29–7
70	T	March 15, 1986	1–1 OT	Vancouver Canucks (1985–86)	33–29–8
71	W	March 20, 1986	6–3	Los Angeles Kings (1985–86)	34–29–8
72	T	March 22, 1986	3–3 OT	New York Islanders (1985–86)	34–29–9
73	T	March 23, 1986	5–5 OT	@ Hartford Whalers (1985–86)	34–29–10
74	L	March 25, 1986	3–6	@ Washington Capitals (1985–86)	34–30–10
75	T	March 27, 1986	3–3 OT	Montreal Canadiens (1985–86)	34–30–11
76	W	March 29, 1986	2–1	Buffalo Sabres (1985–86)	35–30–11
77	W	March 30, 1986	5–3	@ Buffalo Sabres (1985–86)	36–30–11

April

Game	Result	Date	Score	Opponent	Record
78	W	April 3, 1986	4–2	Toronto Maple Leafs (1985–86)	37–30–11
79	T	April 5, 1986	2–2 OT	@ Quebec Nordiques (1985–86)	37–30–12
80	L	April 6, 1986	3–4	Hartford Whalers (1985–86)	37–31–12

Legend: Win (2 points) Loss (0 points) Tie (1 point)

== Playoffs ==
1986 Stanley Cup playoffs
Adams Division Semifinals vs. (A2) Montreal Canadiens – Canadiens win 3–0

Game	Date	Visitor	Score	Home	Record
1	April 9	Boston Bruins	1–3	Montreal Canadiens	0–1
2	April 10	Boston Bruins	2–3	Montreal Canadiens	0–2
3	April 12	Montreal Canadiens	4–3	Boston Bruins	0–3

Legend: Win Loss

== Player statistics ==
=== Regular season ===
Scoring

Player	Pos	GP	G	A	Pts	PIM	+/-	PPG	SHG	GWG
Keith Crowder	RW	78	38	46	84	177	14	20	0	4
Ken Linseman	C	64	23	58	81	97	15	8	0	3
Raymond Bourque	D	74	19	58	77	68	17	11	0	3
Barry Pederson	C	79	29	47	76	60	19	12	0	6
Charlie Simmer	LW	55	36	24	60	42	12	14	0	5
Rick Middleton	RW	49	14	30	44	10	17	4	2	0
Randy Burridge	LW	52	17	25	42	28	17	1	0	2
Steve Kasper	C	80	17	23	40	73	-10	1	3	1
Gord Kluzak	D	70	8	31	39	155	3	3	0	0
Geoff Courtnall	LW	64	21	16	37	61	1	2	0	4
Dave Pasin	RW	71	18	19	37	50	-1	4	0	3
Kraig Nienhuis	LW	70	16	14	30	37	-10	3	0	2
Mike O'Connell	D	63	8	21	29	47	-8	4	1	0
Michael Thelvén	D	60	6	20	26	48	7	1	0	0
Nevin Markwart	LW	65	7	15	22	207	-2	0	0	1
Bill Derlago	C	39	5	16	21	15	4	1	1	1
Dave Reid	LW	37	10	10	20	10	2	4	0	1
John Blum	D	61	1	7	8	80	8	0	0	0
Reed Larson	D	13	3	4	7	8	5	1	0	0
Brian Curran	D	43	2	5	7	192	6	0	0	0
Mike Milbury	D	22	2	5	7	102	1	0	0	0
Louis Sleigher	RW	13	4	2	6	20	-4	0	0	1
Alain Cote	D	32	0	6	6	14	5	0	0	0
Mats Thelin	D	31	2	3	5	29	3	1	0	0
Morris Lukowich	LW	14	1	4	5	10	2	0	0	0
Jay Miller	LW	46	3	0	3	178	-3	0	0	0
Lyndon Byers	RW	5	0	2	2	9	1	0	0	0
Greg Johnston	RW	20	0	2	2	0	-1	0	0	0
Pete Peeters	G	8	0	2	2	4	0	0	0	0
Frank Simonetti	D	17	1	0	1	14	-1	0	0	0
Doug Keans	G	30	0	1	1	12	0	0	0	0
Wade Campbell	D	8	0	0	0	15	1	0	0	0
John Carter	LW	3	0	0	0	0	0	0	0	0
Cleon Daskalakis	G	2	0	0	0	0	0	0	0	0
Dave Donnelly	C	8	0	0	0	17	3	0	0	0
Dwight Foster	RW	13	0	0	0	4	-5	0	0	0
Bill Ranford	G	4	0	0	0	0	0	0	0	0
Pat Riggin	G	39	0	0	0	4	0	0	0	0

Goaltending

Player	MIN	GP	W	L	T	GA	GAA	SO	SA	SV	SV%
Pat Riggin	2272	39	17	11	8	127	3.35	1	973	846	.869
Doug Keans	1757	30	14	13	3	107	3.65	0	782	675	.863
Pete Peeters	485	8	3	4	1	31	3.84	0	245	214	.873
Bill Ranford	240	4	3	1	0	10	2.50	0	106	96	.906
Cleon Daskalakis	120	2	0	2	0	10	5.00	0	63	53	.841
Team:	4874	80	37	31	12	285	3.51	1	2169	1884	.869

=== Playoffs ===
Scoring

Player	Pos	GP	G	A	Pts	PIM	+/-	PPG	SHG	GWG
Randy Burridge	LW	3	0	4	4	12	2	0	0	0
Keith Crowder	RW	3	2	0	2	21	1	0	0	0
Gord Kluzak	D	3	1	1	2	16	0	1	0	0
Dwight Foster	RW	3	0	2	2	2	1	0	0	0
Steve Kasper	C	3	1	0	1	4	-4	0	1	0
Reed Larson	D	3	1	0	1	6	-2	1	0	0
Barry Pederson	C	3	1	0	1	0	1	0	0	0
Ken Linseman	C	3	0	1	1	17	0	0	0	0
Dave Pasin	RW	3	0	1	1	0	1	0	0	0
John Blum	D	3	0	0	0	6	0	0	0	0
Raymond Bourque	D	3	0	0	0	0	0	0	0	0
Geoff Courtnall	LW	3	0	0	0	2	-4	0	0	0
Brian Curran	D	2	0	0	0	4	-1	0	0	0
Mike Milbury	D	1	0	0	0	17	-2	0	0	0
Jay Miller	LW	2	0	0	0	17	-1	0	0	0
Kraig Nienhuis	LW	2	0	0	0	14	-4	0	0	0
Bill Ranford	G	2	0	0	0	0	0	0	0	0
Pat Riggin	G	1	0	0	0	2	0	0	0	0
Charlie Simmer	LW	3	0	0	0	4	-1	0	0	0
Frank Simonetti	D	3	0	0	0	0	0	0	0	0
Louis Sleigher	RW	1	0	0	0	14	-1	0	0	0
Michael Thelven	D	3	0	0	0	0	-2	0	0	0

Goaltending

Player	MIN	GP	W	L	GA	GAA	SO	SA	SV	SV%
Bill Ranford	120	2	0	2	7	3.50	0	44	37	.841
Pat Riggin	60	1	0	1	3	3.00	0	23	20	.870
Team:	180	3	0	3	10	3.33	0	67	57	.851

Note:

Pos = Position;GP = Games played; G = Goals; A = Assists; Pts = Points; PIM = Penalty minutes; +/- = Plus/minus; PPG = Power-play goals; SHG = Short-handed goals; GWG = Game-winning goals
Pos = Position;GP = Games played; Min, TOI = Minutes played; W = Wins; L = Losses; T,T/OT = Ties; OTL = Overtime losses; GA = Goals-against; GAA = Goals-against average; SO = Shutouts; SA = Shots against; SV = Shots saved;SV% = Save percentage;

== Draft picks ==
Boston's draft picks at the 1985 NHL entry draft held at the Metro Toronto Convention Centre in Toronto, Ontario.

Round	#	Player	Nationality	College/Junior/Club team (League)
2	32	Alain Cote	Canada	Quebec Remparts (QMJHL)
3	52	Bill Ranford	Canada	New Westminster Bruins (WHL)
4	73	Jamie Kelly	United States	Scituate High School (USHS-MA)
5	94	Steve Moore	Canada	London Diamonds (OPJHL)
6	115	Gord Hynes	Canada	Medicine Hat Tigers (WHL)
7	136	Per Martinelle	Sweden	AIK IF (Sweden)
8	157	Randy Burridge	Canada	Peterborough Petes (OHL)
9	178	Gord Cruickshank	Canada	Providence College (Hockey East)
10	199	Dave Buda	Canada	Streetsville Derbys (OPJHL)
10	210	Bob Beers	United States	Buffalo Jr. Sabres (NAHL)
11	220	John Byce	United States	Madison Memorial High School (USHS-WI)
12	241	Marc West	Canada	Burlington Cougars (OPJHL)

== See also ==
- 1985–86 NHL season
