= 1985–86 Chicago Black Hawks season =

National Hockey League team season

1985–86 Chicago Black Hawks
- Norris Division champions
- Division: 1st Norris
- Conference: 3rd Campbell
- 1985–86 record: 39–33–8
- Home record: 23–12–5
- Road record: 16–21–3
- Goals for: 351
- Goals against: 349

Team information
- General manager: Bob Pulford
- Coach: Bob Pulford
- Captain: Darryl Sutter; Bob Murray (interim)
- Alternate captains: Unknown
- Arena: Chicago Stadium

Team leaders
- Goals: Denis Savard (47)
- Assists: Denis Savard (69)
- Points: Denis Savard (116)
- Penalty minutes: Al Secord (201)
- Plus/minus: Troy Murray (+32)
- Wins: Murray Bannerman (19)
- Goals against average: Bob Sauve (3.96)

The 1985–86 Chicago Black Hawks season was the 60th season in franchise history. The Black Hawks, led by three 40-goal scorers in Denis Savard, Troy Murray and Al Secord, captured the Norris Division title for the first time since 1982–83 but were swept out of the first round of the playoffs by the Toronto Maple Leafs.

== Offseason ==
After a successful 1984–85 season in which the Black Hawks made it to the Campbell Conference finals, the club was happy with their roster and did not make any major off-season moves. The club did announce that general manager Bob Pulford would remain the head coach, as he took over on an interim basis after Orval Tessier was fired in February.

At the 1985 NHL entry draft, the club selected defenceman Dave Manson with their first round, 11th overall pick. Manson played with the Prince Albert Raiders of the WHL, where he helped the club win the 1985 Memorial Cup. A tough player, Manson appeared in 72 games with Prince Albert, scoring eight goals and 38 points, as well as 247 penalty minutes during the 1984–85 season.

== Regular season ==
Very early into the season, the Black Hawks acquired goaltender Bob Sauve from the Buffalo Sabres in exchange for a third-round draft pick in the 1986 NHL entry draft. Sauve was coming off a 13–10–3 record with the Sabres in 1984–85 with a 3.22 GAA and a .855 save percentage in 27 games. He would split time with Murray Bannerman, replacing Warren Skorodenski, who was sent back to the AHL.

The Hawks started slow, posting a 4–9–1 record in their first 14 games, however, the club was in third place in the weak Norris Division, only two points out of first place. The Black Hawks continued to sputter along throughout the first half of December, as following a five-game losing streak, Chicago had a record of 9–15–4, although they still remained in third place, just ahead of the Toronto Maple Leafs. The Hawks eventually heated up, going 16–4–3 through their next 23 games, vaulting them into first place in the division with a 25–19–7 record. The team battled the Minnesota North Stars and St. Louis Blues for first place in the Norris Division, and Chicago eventually won the division with a 39–33–8 record, earning 86 points, winning the division for the first time since the 1982–83 season.

On offense, the Black Hawks finished third in the NHL with 351 goals. Denis Savard led the way with 49 goals and 116 points in 80 games, while Troy Murray had a breakout season offensively, scoring 45 goals and 99 points and a club high +32 rating in 80 games played. Eddie Olczyk also saw his offensive production increase significantly, scoring 29 goals and 79 points in 79 games played, as did Al Secord, who scored 40 goals and 76 points in 80 games, as well as leading Chicago with 201 penalty minutes. Steve Larmer had another solid season, scoring 36 goals and 76 points in 80 games, while Curt Fraser added 29 goals and 68 points in only 61 games played.

On defense, Doug Wilson led the way with 17 goals and 64 points in 79 games, while Behn Wilson had 13 goals and 50 points in 69 games. Keith Brown broke out offensively, scoring 11 goals and 40 points in 70 games, while Bob Murray had nine goals and 38 points in 80 games. Ken Yaremchuk scored 14 goals and 34 points in 78 games.

In goal, Murray Bannerman led the club with a 20–19–6 record in 48 games, while posting a 4.48 GAA and a .869 save percentage, and earning one shutout. Bob Sauvé had a 19–13–2 record in 38 games with a 3.94 GAA and a .886 save percentage. The Black Hawks finished the season allowing 349 goals, the fifth highest total in the league.

=== Final standings ===
Norris Division
	GP	W	L	T	GF	GA	Pts
**Chicago Black Hawks**	80	39	33	8	351	349	86
**Minnesota North Stars**	80	38	33	9	327	305	85
**St. Louis Blues**	80	37	34	9	302	291	83
**Toronto Maple Leafs**	80	25	48	7	311	386	57
Detroit Red Wings	80	17	57	6	266	415	40

Note: GP = Games played, W = Wins, L = Losses, T = Ties, Pts = Points, GF = Goals for, GA = Goals against
Note: Teams that qualified for the playoffs are highlighted in bold.

=== Record vs. opponents ===
Norris Division record vs. opponents

==== Vs. Campbell Conference ====
**Vs. Norris Division**

1985–86 NHL records
Team	**CHI**	**DET**	**MIN**	**STL**	**TOR**	**Total**
Chicago	—	6−2	3−3−2	5−3	2−6	**16−14−2**
Detroit	2−6	—	1−6−1	2−5−1	3−4−1	**8−21−3**
Minnesota	3−3−2	6−1−1	—	4−3−1	7−0−1	**20−7−5**
St. Louis	3−5	5−2−1	3−4−1	—	3−3−2	**14−14−4**
Toronto	6−2	4−3−1	0−7−1	3−3−2	—	**13−15−4**

**Vs. Smythe Division**

1985–86 NHL records
Team	**CGY**	**EDM**	**LAK**	**VAN**	**WIN**	**Total**
Chicago	2−1	0−3	1−0−2	3−0	2−1	**8−5−2**
Detroit	0−2−1	0−3	2−1	0−3	0−3	**2−12−1**
Minnesota	2−0−1	1−2	1−2	1−2	1−2	**6−8−1**
St. Louis	2−1	1−1−1	1−1−1	3−0	2−1	**9−4−2**
Toronto	1−2	1−2	1−2	0−2−1	1−1−1	**4−9−2**

**Vs. Wales Conference**

**Vs. Adams Division**

1985–86 NHL records
Team	**BOS**	**BUF**	**HFD**	**MTL**	**QUE**	**Total**
Chicago	2−1	2−1	2−1	0−2−1	1−2	**7−7−1**
Detroit	1−2	1−1−1	1−2	0−3	1−2	**4−10−1**
Minnesota	0−3	1−2	2−1	1−1−1	1−2	**5−9−1**
St. Louis	2−1	1−2	1−1−1	2−1	2−1	**8−6−1**
Toronto	0−2−1	2−1	0−3	1−2	0−3	**3−11−1**

**Vs. Patrick Division**

1985–86 NHL records
Team	**NJD**	**NYI**	**NYR**	**PHI**	**PIT**	**WSH**	**Total**
Chicago	1−2	2−0−1	3−0	0−2−1	1−1−1	1−2	**8−7−3**
Detroit	0−2−1	0−3	0−3	1−2	1−2	1−2	**3−14−1**
Minnesota	2−1	2−0−1	2−1	0−2−1	0−3	1−2	**7−9−2**
St. Louis	2−1	1−1−1	1−1−1	1−2	1−2	0−3	**6−10−2**
Toronto	2−1	0−3	1−2	1−2	0−3	1−2	**5−13−0**

== Schedule and results ==
1985–86 regular season
October

Game	Result	Date	Score	Opponent	Record
1	L	October 10, 1985	2–6	@ Quebec Nordiques (1985–86)	0–1–0
2	L	October 12, 1985	3–6	@ Montreal Canadiens (1985–86)	0–2–0
3	L	October 13, 1985	1–5	Toronto Maple Leafs (1985–86)	0–3–0
4	T	October 16, 1985	5–5 OT	Pittsburgh Penguins (1985–86)	0–3–1
5	W	October 19, 1985	6–2	@ Detroit Red Wings (1985–86)	1–3–1
6	L	October 20, 1985	2–5	Philadelphia Flyers (1985–86)	1–4–1
7	W	October 23, 1985	9–2	Hartford Whalers (1985–86)	2–4–1
8	W	October 24, 1985	6–4	@ New Jersey Devils (1985–86)	3–4–1
9	L	October 27, 1985	2–4	Washington Capitals (1985–86)	3–5–1
10	W	October 30, 1985	6–5	@ Minnesota North Stars (1985–86)	4–5–1

November

Game	Result	Date	Score	Opponent	Record
11	L	November 2, 1985	4–5	@ Boston Bruins (1985–86)	4–6–1
12	L	November 5, 1985	4–8	@ Washington Capitals (1985–86)	4–7–1
13	L	November 7, 1985	2–6	@ Philadelphia Flyers (1985–86)	4–8–1
14	L	November 9, 1985	1–3	@ Pittsburgh Penguins (1985–86)	4–9–1
15	W	November 11, 1985	5–4 OT	@ New York Rangers (1985–86)	5–9–1
16	W	November 13, 1985	6–4	Quebec Nordiques (1985–86)	6–9–1
17	L	November 16, 1985	4–6	@ Toronto Maple Leafs (1985–86)	6–10–1
18	T	November 17, 1985	5–5 OT	Minnesota North Stars (1985–86)	6–10–2
19	W	November 20, 1985	2–0	Vancouver Canucks (1985–86)	7–10–2
20	W	November 23, 1985	7–3	@ St. Louis Blues (1985–86)	8–10–2
21	T	November 24, 1985	4–4 OT	Los Angeles Kings (1985–86)	8–10–3
22	W	November 26, 1985	5–3	@ Vancouver Canucks (1985–86)	9–10–3
23	T	November 30, 1985	4–4 OT	@ Los Angeles Kings (1985–86)	9–10–4

December

Game	Result	Date	Score	Opponent	Record
24	L	December 3, 1985	2–9	@ Minnesota North Stars (1985–86)	9–11–4
25	L	December 6, 1985	2–5	@ Calgary Flames (1985–86)	9–12–4
26	L	December 8, 1985	3–4	@ Edmonton Oilers (1985–86)	9–13–4
27	L	December 11, 1985	9–12	Edmonton Oilers (1985–86)	9–14–4
28	L	December 14, 1985	3–6	@ Montreal Canadiens (1985–86)	9–15–4
29	W	December 15, 1985	6–4	Detroit Red Wings (1985–86)	10–15–4
30	W	December 18, 1985	5–4	Winnipeg Jets (1985–86)	11–15–4
31	W	December 21, 1985	6–3	@ Detroit Red Wings (1985–86)	12–15–4
32	W	December 22, 1985	5–4 OT	Calgary Flames (1985–86)	13–15–4
33	L	December 26, 1985	6–9	@ St. Louis Blues (1985–86)	13–16–4
34	W	December 28, 1985	7–4	@ Washington Capitals (1985–86)	14–16–4
35	W	December 29, 1985	4–3	Boston Bruins (1985–86)	15–16–4

January

Game	Result	Date	Score	Opponent	Record
36	W	January 1, 1986	7–4	Pittsburgh Penguins (1985–86)	16–16–4
37	W	January 4, 1986	4–1	@ New York Islanders (1985–86)	17–16–4
38	W	January 5, 1986	6–2	Minnesota North Stars (1985–86)	18–16–4
39	L	January 8, 1986	7–8	New Jersey Devils (1985–86)	18–17–4
40	W	January 10, 1986	9–4	@ Detroit Red Wings (1985–86)	19–17–4
41	W	January 12, 1986	4–2	Hartford Whalers (1985–86)	20–17–4
42	T	January 14, 1986	3–3 OT	@ Minnesota North Stars (1985–86)	20–17–5
43	W	January 15, 1986	4–2	Buffalo Sabres (1985–86)	21–17–5
44	L	January 17, 1986	1–5	@ Winnipeg Jets (1985–86)	21–18–5
45	W	January 19, 1986	6–4	Detroit Red Wings (1985–86)	22–18–5
46	T	January 22, 1986	3–3 OT	Montreal Canadiens (1985–86)	22–18–6
47	W	January 24, 1986	5–3	@ Buffalo Sabres (1985–86)	23–18–6
48	T	January 25, 1986	3–3 OT	@ New York Islanders (1985–86)	23–18–7
49	L	January 27, 1986	3–4	Edmonton Oilers (1985–86)	23–19–7
50	W	January 29, 1986	5–4	New York Rangers (1985–86)	24–19–7

February

Game	Result	Date	Score	Opponent	Record
51	W	February 1, 1986	7–4	@ Toronto Maple Leafs (1985–86)	25–19–7
52	L	February 2, 1986	3–4	Toronto Maple Leafs (1985–86)	25–20–7
53	W	February 5, 1986	3–2	New York Islanders (1985–86)	26–20–7
54	L	February 8, 1986	5–8	@ Quebec Nordiques (1985–86)	26–21–7
55	T	February 9, 1986	2–2 OT	Philadelphia Flyers (1985–86)	26–21–8
56	W	February 11, 1986	5–4	Boston Bruins (1985–86)	27–21–8
57	W	February 13, 1986	5–4 OT	Toronto Maple Leafs (1985–86)	28–21–8
58	L	February 15, 1986	3–4	@ Toronto Maple Leafs (1985–86)	28–22–8
59	W	February 16, 1986	4–2	St. Louis Blues (1985–86)	29–22–8
60	L	February 19, 1986	5–6	Minnesota North Stars (1985–86)	29–23–8
61	W	February 21, 1986	5–2	@ Winnipeg Jets (1985–86)	30–23–8
62	W	February 23, 1986	6–2	Calgary Flames (1985–86)	31–23–8
63	W	February 27, 1986	6–3	@ Los Angeles Kings (1985–86)	32–23–8

March

Game	Result	Date	Score	Opponent	Record
64	L	March 1, 1986	3–6	@ St. Louis Blues (1985–86)	32–24–8
65	W	March 2, 1986	6–4	St. Louis Blues (1985–86)	33–24–8
66	L	March 5, 1986	3–8	Detroit Red Wings (1985–86)	33–25–8
67	L	March 8, 1986	3–4	@ Toronto Maple Leafs (1985–86)	33–26–8
68	W	March 9, 1986	4–2	St. Louis Blues (1985–86)	34–26–8
69	L	March 12, 1986	6–7	Buffalo Sabres (1985–86)	34–27–8
70	L	March 15, 1986	4–11	@ Hartford Whalers (1985–86)	34–28–8
71	W	March 16, 1986	5–4	Vancouver Canucks (1985–86)	35–28–8
72	L	March 22, 1986	4–8	@ Detroit Red Wings (1985–86)	35–29–8
73	W	March 23, 1986	5–3	@ New York Rangers (1985–86)	36–29–8
74	W	March 26, 1986	5–3	Detroit Red Wings (1985–86)	37–29–8
75	L	March 29, 1986	2–3	@ New Jersey Devils (1985–86)	37–30–8
76	L	March 30, 1986	4–5 OT	Toronto Maple Leafs (1985–86)	37–31–8

April

Game	Result	Date	Score	Opponent	Record
77	W	April 1, 1986	2–1	@ Minnesota North Stars (1985–86)	38–31–8
78	L	April 2, 1986	5–7	Minnesota North Stars (1985–86)	38–32–8
79	L	April 5, 1986	5–7	@ St. Louis Blues (1985–86)	38–33–8
80	W	April 6, 1986	3–1	St. Louis Blues (1985–86)	39–33–8

Legend: Win (2 points) Loss (0 points) Tie (1 point)

== Playoffs ==
=== Toronto Maple Leafs 3, Chicago Black Hawks 0 ===
The Black Hawks opened the 1986 Stanley Cup playoffs against the Toronto Maple Leafs. The Maple Leafs struggled throughout the 1985–86 season, earning a record of 25–48–7, earning 57 points, placing them in fourth place in the Norris Division, which was 29 fewer points than the heavily favored first place Black Hawks.

The series opened at Chicago Stadium with Bob Sauvé getting the start in goal, and the Leafs took an early 1–0 after a goal by Steve Thomas only 3:46 into the game. The Black Hawks tied it up midway through the period on a goal by Doug Wilson, however, Toronto retook the lead before the end of the period on a goal by Wendel Clark, giving the Leafs a 2–1 lead. The teams then played to a scoreless second period. Early in the third, Chicago tied the game on a goal by Darryl Sutter 4:48 into the frame, however, just over a minute later, the Leafs took the lead again on a Gary Leeman goal. Walt Poddubny scored again for Toronto just over three minutes later, giving the Leafs a 4–2 lead. Late in the period, the Leafs Steve Thomas scored his second goal of the game, giving Toronto a 5–2 lead. The Hawks Tom Lysiak scored late in the game, as the final score was 5–3 for the Maple Leafs.

In game two, the Hawks changed goaltenders, as Murray Bannerman was given the start. In the first period, Dan Daoust scored early for Toronto, giving the Leafs a 1–0 lead 4:01 into the game. Denis Savard tied it up for Chicago midway through the period, however, Steve Thomas restored the lead for Toronto with just under five minutes remaining in the period. The Hawks' Denis Savard tied the game with 32 seconds remaining in the first period, as the score was 2–2 after one period. In the second, Denis Savard completed the hat trick just 1:04 into the period, giving the Black Hawks a 3–2 lead. Soon, Murray Bannerman was injured, the Hawks then pulled and replaced him with Bob Sauvé. With just over five minutes remaining in the second period, Denis Savard scored his fourth goal of the game, giving the Hawks a 4–2 lead. Toronto's Wendel Clark scored just over a minute later, making the score 4–3 for Chicago after two periods. In the third, there was no scoring until just over five minutes remaining in the period, when the Leafs Peter Ihnačák scored, tying the game at 4–4. Then, with only 56 seconds remaining, the Leafs Walt Poddubny scored, giving Toronto a late 5–4 lead. The Leafs sealed the win with an empty net goal by Steve Thomas, giving Toronto the 6–4 victory, and a 2–0 series lead. Leafs goaltender Allan Bester made 42 saves for the win.

The series shifted to Maple Leaf Gardens in Toronto for the third game. The Black Hawks started goaltender Murray Bannerman for this game after the late collapse by Bob Sauvé in the previous game. The Maple Leafs came out strong in the first period, as Russ Courtnall and Rick Vaive scored, making it 2–0 for Toronto. In the second period, the Leafs continued to dominate the game, as they took a 5–0 lead after goals by Tom Fergus, Miroslav Fryčer, and Wendel Clark. The Black Hawks eventually scored two goals of their own, as Ken Yaremchuk and Tom Lysiak scored 17 seconds apart late in the period, cutting the Leafs lead to 5–2. In the third, the Leafs put the game out of reach after goals by Walt Poddubny and Russ Courtnall, as Toronto defeated the Black Hawks 7–2, and stunned the hockey world by sweeping Chicago out of the playoffs.

1986 Stanley Cup playoffs
Norris Division Semifinals vs. (N4) Toronto Maple Leafs – Maple Leafs win 3–0

Game	Date	Visitor	Score	Home	Series
1	April 9	Toronto Maple Leafs	5–3	Chicago Black Hawks	0–1
2	April 10	Toronto Maple Leafs	6–4	Chicago Black Hawks	0–2
3	April 12	Chicago Black Hawks	2–7	Toronto Maple Leafs	0–3

Legend: Win Loss

== Player stats ==
=== Regular season ===
Scoring

Player	Pos	GP	G	A	Pts	PIM	+/-	PPG	SHG	GWG
Denis Savard	C	80	47	69	116	111	7	14	1	8
Troy Murray	C	80	45	54	99	94	32	9	5	7
Eddie Olczyk	C	79	29	50	79	47	2	8	1	2
Al Secord	LW	80	40	36	76	201	8	12	0	3
Steve Larmer	RW	80	31	45	76	47	9	13	1	3
Curt Fraser	LW	61	29	39	68	84	11	7	0	1
Doug Wilson	D	79	17	47	64	80	24	3	0	2
Behn Wilson	D	69	13	37	50	113	-11	10	0	6
Keith Brown	D	70	11	29	40	87	-6	1	1	0
Bob Murray	D	80	9	29	38	75	6	3	0	1
Ken Yaremchuk	C	78	14	20	34	43	-17	0	0	2
Darryl Sutter	LW	50	17	10	27	44	-15	3	0	2
Bill Watson	RW	52	8	16	24	2	-4	2	0	0
Jack O'Callahan	D	80	4	19	23	116	5	0	0	0
Tom Lysiak	C	51	2	19	21	14	-19	0	0	0
Wayne Presley	RW	38	7	8	15	38	-6	0	0	1
Jerry Dupont	D	75	2	13	15	173	-17	0	0	0
Marc Bergevin	D	71	7	7	14	60	0	0	0	1
Bill Gardner	C	46	3	10	13	6	-8	0	0	0
Rick Paterson	C	70	9	3	12	24	-1	0	5	0
Steve Ludzik	C	49	6	5	11	21	-2	0	1	0
Murray Bannerman	G	48	0	2	2	6	0	0	0	0
Bruce Boudreau	C	7	1	0	1	2	1	0	0	0
Bob Sauve	G	38	0	1	1	27	0	0	0	0
Bruce Cassidy	D	1	0	0	0	0	0	0	0	0
Jeff Larmer	LW	2	0	0	0	0	1	0	0	0
Mark LaVarre	RW	2	0	0	0	0	-2	0	0	0
Tom McMurchy	RW	4	0	0	0	2	-1	0	0	0
Victor Posa	LW/D	2	0	0	0	2	0	0	0	0
Warren Skorodenski	G	1	0	0	0	0	0	0	0	0

Goaltending

Player	MIN	GP	W	L	T	GA	GAA	SO	SA	SV	SV%
Murray Bannerman	2689	48	20	19	6	201	4.48	1	1538	1337	.869
Bob Sauve	2099	38	19	13	2	138	3.94	0	1210	1072	.886
Warren Skorodenski	60	1	0	1	0	6	6.00	0	45	39	.867
Team:	4848	80	39	33	8	345	4.27	1	2793	2448	.876

=== Playoffs ===
Scoring

Player	Pos	GP	G	A	Pts	PIM	+/-	PPG	SHG	GWG
Denis Savard	C	3	4	1	5	6	-1	2	0	0
Tom Lysiak	C	3	2	1	3	2	-1	0	0	0
Darryl Sutter	LW	3	1	2	3	0	-4	1	0	0
Steve Larmer	RW	3	0	3	3	4	-1	0	0	0
Doug Wilson	D	3	1	1	2	2	-5	0	0	0
Ken Yaremchuk	C	3	1	1	2	2	2	0	0	0
Bob Murray	D	3	0	2	2	0	-4	0	0	0
Al Secord	LW	2	0	2	2	26	-1	0	0	0
Keith Brown	D	3	0	1	1	9	-1	0	0	0
Curt Fraser	LW	3	0	1	1	12	-4	0	0	0
Jack O'Callahan	D	3	0	1	1	4	-3	0	0	0
Bill Watson	RW	2	0	1	1	0	-1	0	0	0
Murray Bannerman	G	2	0	0	0	4	0	0	0	0
Marc Bergevin	D	3	0	0	0	0	-1	0	0	0
Jerry Dupont	D	1	0	0	0	0	1	0	0	0
Steve Ludzik	C	3	0	0	0	12	-1	0	0	0
Troy Murray	C	2	0	0	0	2	-3	0	0	0
Eddie Olczyk	C	3	0	0	0	0	-6	0	0	0
Rick Paterson	C	3	0	0	0	0	0	0	0	0
Wayne Presley	RW	3	0	0	0	0	0	0	0	0
Bob Sauve	G	2	0	0	0	0	0	0	0	0
Behn Wilson	D	2	0	0	0	2	-1	0	0	0

Goaltending

Player	MIN	GP	W	L	GA	GAA	SO	SA	SV	SV%
Murray Bannerman	81	2	0	1	9	6.67	0	40	31	.775
Bob Sauve	99	2	0	2	8	4.85	0	61	53	.869
Team:	180	3	0	3	17	5.67	0	101	84	.832

Note: Pos = Position; GP = Games played; G = Goals; A = Assists; Pts = Points; +/- = plus/minus; PIM = Penalty minutes; PPG = Power-play goals; SHG = Short-handed goals; GWG = Game-winning goals; MIN = Minutes played; W = Wins; L = Losses; T = Ties; GA = Goals-against; GAA = Goals-against average; SO = Shutouts; SA = Shots against; SV = Shots saved; SV% = Save percentage;

== Draft picks ==
Chicago's draft picks at the 1985 NHL entry draft held at the Metro Toronto Convention Centre in Toronto, Ontario.

Round	#	Player	Nationality	College/Junior/Club team (League)
1	11	Dave Manson	Canada	Prince Albert Raiders (WHL)
3	53	Andy Helmuth	Canada	Ottawa 67's (OHL)
4	74	Dan Vincelette	Canada	Drummondville Voltigeurs (QMJHL)
5	87	Rick Herbert	Canada	Portland Winter Hawks (WHL)
5	95	Brad Belland	Canada	Sudbury Wolves (OHL)
6	116	Jonas Heed	Sweden	Södertälje SK (Sweden)
7	137	Victor Posa	United States	University of Wisconsin Madison (WCHA)
8	158	John Reid	Canada	Belleville Bulls (OHL)
9	179	Richard Laplante	Canada	University of Vermont (Hockey East)
10	200	Brad Hamilton	Canada	Aurora Tigers (OPJHL)
11	221	Ian Pound	Canada	Kitchener Rangers (OHL)
12	242	Richard Braccia	United States	Avon Old Farms (USHS-CT)

== See also ==
- 1985–86 NHL season
