= Jim Pavese =

American ice hockey player

- Born: May 8, 1962 (age 62); New York City, U.S.
- Height: 6 ft 2 in (188 cm)
- Weight: 205 lb (93 kg; 14 st 9 lb)
- Position: Defence
- Shot: Left
- Played for: Hartford Whalers; Detroit Red Wings; New York Rangers; St. Louis Blues
- NHL draft: 54th overall, 1980; St. Louis Blues
- Playing career: 1981–1991

James Peter Pavese (born May 8, 1962) is an American former professional ice hockey player who played 328 games in the National Hockey League between 1981 and 1989. He was drafted as the 52nd overall pick by the St. Louis Blues in the 1980 NHL entry draft. He was known as a gritty "stay at home" defender with the St. Louis Blues, New York Rangers, Detroit Red Wings, and Hartford Whalers.

== Career statistics ==
=== Regular season and playoffs ===
			Regular season					Playoffs
Season	Team	League	GP	G	A	Pts	PIM	GP	G	A	Pts	PIM
1975–76	Long Island Royals	NYJHL	42	1	9	10	72	—	—	—	—	—
1976–77	Long Island Royals	NYJHL	32	6	31	37	32	—	—	—	—	—
1978–79	Peterborough Junior Bees	OPJHL	34	8	32	40	106	—	—	—	—	—
1978–79	Peterborough Petes	OMJHL	16	1	1	2	22	2	0	0	0	0
1979–80	Kitchener Rangers	OMJHL	68	10	26	36	206	—	—	—	—	—
1980–81	Kitchener Rangers	OHL	19	3	12	15	93	—	—	—	—	—
1980–81	Sault Ste. Marie Greyhounds	OHL	43	3	25	28	127	19	1	3	4	69
1981–82	Sault Ste. Marie Greyhounds	OHL	26	4	21	25	110	13	2	12	14	38
1981–82	St. Louis Blues	NHL	42	2	9	11	101	3	0	3	3	2
1981–82	Salt Lake Golden Eagles	CHL	—	—	—	—	—	1	0	0	0	17
1982–83	St. Louis Blues	NHL	24	0	2	2	45	4	0	0	0	6
1982–83	Salt Lake Golden Eagles	CHL	36	5	6	11	165	4	1	3	4	2
1983–84	St. Louis Blues	NHL	4	0	1	1	19	—	—	—	—	—
1983–84	Montana Magic	CHL	47	1	19	20	147	—	—	—	—	—
1984–85	St. Louis Blues	NHL	51	2	5	7	69	1	0	0	0	5
1985–86	St. Louis Blues	NHL	69	4	7	11	116	19	0	2	2	51
1986–87	St. Louis Blues	NHL	69	2	9	11	129	2	0	0	0	2
1987–88	St. Louis Blues	NHL	4	0	1	1	8	—	—	—	—	—
1987–88	New York Rangers	NHL	14	0	1	1	48	—	—	—	—	—
1987–88	Colorado Rangers	IHL	1	0	0	0	2	—	—	—	—	—
1987–88	New Haven Nighthawks	AHL	1	0	1	1	0	—	—	—	—	—
1987–88	Detroit Red Wings	NHL	7	0	3	3	21	4	0	1	1	15
1988–89	Detroit Red Wings	NHL	39	3	6	9	130	—	—	—	—	—
1988–89	Hartford Whalers	NHL	5	0	0	0	5	1	0	0	0	0
1990–91	New Haven Nighthawks	AHL	55	4	14	18	73	—	—	—	—	—
NHL totals			328	13	44	57	691	34	0	6	6	81
