= Don Dietrich (ice hockey) =

Canadian ice hockey player (1961–2021)

- Born: April 5, 1961; Deloraine, Manitoba, Canada
- Died: February 16, 2021 (aged 59); Deloraine, Manitoba, Canada
- Height: 6 ft 1 in (185 cm)
- Weight: 195 lb (88 kg; 13 st 13 lb)
- Position: Defence
- Shot: Left
- Played for: Chicago Black Hawks; New Jersey Devils
- NHL draft: 183rd overall, 1980; Chicago Black Hawks
- Playing career: 1981–1991

Donald Armond Dietrich (April 5, 1961 – February 16, 2021) was a Canadian ice hockey defenceman who played 28 games in the National Hockey League with the Chicago Black Hawks and New Jersey Devils between 1983 and 1986,. He was selected 183rd overall by the Chicago Black Hawks in the 1980 NHL Entry Draft. He joined the Hawks for 17 games in 1983–84, recording five assists, but spent most of his time in the Chicago organization in the minor leagues. He was traded to the New Jersey Devils in 1985 along with Rich Preston for Bob MacMillan. He appeared in 11 games with the Devils in 1985–86 before spending four years playing in West Germany. He retired in 1991.

Dietrich was born in Deloraine, Manitoba. Dietrich died in 2021 at the age of 59, he had Parkinson's disease and cancer in his later years.

== Career statistics ==
=== Regular season and playoffs ===
			Regular season					Playoffs
Season	Team	League	GP	G	A	Pts	PIM	GP	G	A	Pts	PIM
1978–79	Brandon Wheat Kings	WHL	69	6	37	43	29	21	3	2	5	10
1978–79	Brandon Wheat Kings	M-Cup	—	—	—	—	—	5	0	1	1	2
1979–80	Brandon Wheat Kings	WHL	63	15	45	60	56	11	4	5	9	15
1980–81	Brandon Wheat Kings	WHL	72	16	64	80	84	5	2	6	8	0
1981–82	New Brunswick Hawks	AHL	62	1	5	6	14	2	0	0	0	0
1982–83	Springfield Indians	AHL	76	6	26	32	26	—	—	—	—	—
1983–84	Chicago Black Hawks	NHL	17	0	5	5	0	—	—	—	—	—
1983–84	Springfield Indians	AHL	50	14	21	35	14	—	—	—	—	—
1984–85	Maine Mariners	AHL	75	6	21	27	36	11	3	4	7	4
1985–86	New Jersey Devils	NHL	11	0	2	2	10	—	—	—	—	—
1985–86	Maine Mariners	AHL	68	9	11	20	33	3	0	0	0	0
1986–87	Schwenninger ERC	GER	35	14	29	43	34	3	1	1	2	0
1986–87	EHC Kloten	NLA	2	0	1	1	4	4	0	1	1	2
1987–88	Hershey Bears	AHL	3	0	0	0	0	—	—	—	—	—
1987–88	Schwenninger ERC	GER	22	5	18	23	10	5	0	1	1	0
1988–89	Schwenninger ERC	GER	35	12	23	35	24	3	1	0	1	6
1988–89	ETC Timmendorfer Strand	GER-4	36	24	22	46	14	—	—	—	—	—
1989–90	SC Lyss	NLB	3	1	1	2	2	—	—	—	—	—
1989–90	Canadian National Team	Intl	3	0	2	2	0	—	—	—	—	—
1990–91	New Haven Nighthawks	AHL	13	0	2	2	0	—	—	—	—	—
1990–91	Moncton Hawks	AHL	3	0	2	2	0	—	—	—	—	—
1990–91	Roanoke Valley Rebels	ECHL	2	0	1	1	8	—	—	—	—	—
1994–95	Deloraine Royals	SWHL	—	—	—	—	—	—	—	—	—	—
AHL totals			350	36	88	124	123	16	3	4	7	4
NHL totals			28	0	7	7	10	—	—	—	—	—
