= List of Hartford Whalers players =

This is a list of players who played at least one game for the Hartford Whalers (1979–80 to 1996–97) of the National Hockey League (NHL). For a list of players who played for the Whalers in the World Hockey Association, see List of New England Whalers players.

== Key ==
- Current NHL player.
- Hockey Hall of Famer, or retired number.

Abbreviations
HHOF	Elected to the Hockey Hall of Fame
Ret	Retired number
C	Center
D	Defenseman
L	Left wing
R	Right wing

Goaltenders
W	Wins
L	Losses
T	Ties
OTL ^{a}	Overtime losses
SO	Shutouts
GAA	Goals against average
SV%	Save percentage

Skaters
GP	Games played
G	Goals
A	Assists
Pts	Points
PIM	Penalty minutes

== Skaters ==
				Regular season					Playoffs				
Player	Team	Position	Years	GP	G	A	Pts	PIM	GP	G	A	Pts	PIM
Thommy Abrahamsson		D	1980–1981	32	6	11	17	16	—	—	—	—	—
Gregory Adams		L	1982–1983	79	10	13	23	216	—	—	—	—	—
Jim Agnew		D	1992–1993	16	0	0	0	68	—	—	—	—	—
Steve Alley		L	1979–1981	15	3	3	6	11	3	0	1	1	0
Ray Allison		R	1979–1981	70	17	12	29	13	2	0	1	1	0
John Anderson		R	1985–1989	215	72	117	189	69	20	6	11	17	2
Russell Anderson		D	1981–1983	82	1	9	10	256	—	—	—	—	—
Mikael Andersson		R	1989–1992	165	35	60	95	28	12	0	5	5	8
Michael Antonovich		C	1979–1980	5	0	1	1	2	—	—	—	—	—
Fred Arthur		D	1980–1981	3	0	0	0	0	—	—	—	—	—
David Babych		D	1985–1991	349	44	196	240	254	31	7	13	20	32
Wayne Babych		R	1985–1987	41	11	17	28	63	10	0	1	1	2
Jergus Baca		D	1990–1992	10	0	2	2	14	—	—	—	—	—
Reid Bailey		D	1983–1984	12	0	0	0	25	—	—	—	—	—
Norman Barnes		D	1980–1982	74	2	14	16	101	—	—	—	—	—
Dave Barr		R	1986–1987	30	2	4	6	19	—	—	—	—	—
William Bennett		L	1979–1980	24	3	3	6	63	—	—	—	—	—
Marc Bergevin		D	1990–1992	79	7	17	24	68	5	0	0	0	2
James Black		L	1989–1992	32	4	6	10	10	—	—	—	—	—
Robert Bodak		L	1989–1990	1	0	0	0	7	—	—	—	—	—
Tim Bothwell		D	1985–1987	66	3	8	11	53	10	0	0	0	8
Dan Bourbonnais		L	1981–1984	59	3	25	28	11	—	—	—	—	—
Charles Bourgeois		D	1987–1988	1	0	0	0	0	—	—	—	—	—
Patrick Boutette		L	1979–1985	160	47	91	138	286	3	1	0	1	6
Gregory Britz		L	1986–1987	1	0	0	0	0	—	—	—	—	—
Jeff Brown		D	1995–1997	49	7	31	38	38	—	—	—	—	—
Kevin Brown		R	1996–1997	11	0	4	4	6	—	—	—	—	—
Robert Brown		R	1990–1992	86	34	39	73	140	5	1	0	1	7
Jeffrey Brownschidle		D	1981–1983	7	0	1	1	2	—	—	—	—	—
John Brownschidle		D	1983–1986	39	3	6	9	19	—	—	—	—	—
Jeff Brubaker		L	1979–1981	46	5	4	9	95	—	—	—	—	—
Adam Burt		D	1988–1997	499	35	92	127	723	4	0	0	0	0
Gregory Carroll		C	1979–1980	71	13	19	32	24	—	—	—	—	—
James Carson		C	1994–1996	49	10	10	20	29	—	—	—	—	—
Lindsay Carson		C	1987–1988	27	5	4	9	30	5	1	2	3	0
Andrew Cassels		C	1991–1997	438	97	253	350	220	7	2	4	6	6
Brian Chapman		D	1990–1991	3	0	0	0	29	—	—	—	—	—
Kelly Chase		R	1994–1997	111	3	10	13	493	—	—	—	—	—
Steve Chiasson		D	1996–1997	18	3	11	14	7	—	—	—	—	—
Igor Chibirev		C	1993–1995	45	7	12	19	2	—	—	—	—	—
Shane Churla		R	1986–1988	22	0	1	1	92	2	0	0	0	42
Paul Coffey	2004	D	1996–1997	20	3	5	8	18	—	—	—	—	—
Yvon Corriveau		L	1989–1994	114	22	15	37	88	11	4	2	6	18
Sylvain Cote		D	1984–1991	382	31	61	92	147	22	1	6	7	14
Yves Courteau		R	1986–1987	4	0	0	0	0	—	—	—	—	—
Murray Craven		L	1991–1993	128	49	72	121	58	7	3	3	6	6
Bob Crawford		R	1983–1986	182	64	59	123	56	—	—	—	—	—
Michael Crombeen		R	1983–1985	102	5	11	16	41	—	—	—	—	—
Doug Crossman		D	1990–1991	41	4	19	23	19	—	—	—	—	—
Edward Crowley		D	1993–1994	21	1	2	3	10	—	—	—	—	—
Jim Culhane		D	1989–1990	6	0	1	1	6	—	—	—	—	—
John Cullen		C	1990–1993	109	39	63	102	217	13	4	8	12	22
Randy Cunneyworth		L	1989–1994	216	39	36	75	311	12	3	0	3	11
Tony Currie		R	1983–1985	45	15	24	39	16	—	—	—	—	—
Paul Cyr		L	1990–1992	87	12	16	28	126	6	1	0	1	10
Jeff Daniels		L	1996–1997	10	0	2	2	0	—	—	—	—	—
Scott Daniels		L	1992–1996	66	3	6	9	328	—	—	—	—	—
Joseph Day		L	1991–1993	48	1	10	11	57	—	—	—	—	—
Dave Debol		C	1979–1981	92	26	26	52	4	3	0	0	0	0
Gerald Diduck		D	1995–1997	135	2	19	21	128	—	—	—	—	—
Kevin Dineen		R	1984–1997	587	235	268	503	1,237	38	17	14	31	101
Hnat Domenichelli		L	1996–1997	13	2	1	3	7	—	—	—	—	—
Jordy Douglas		L	1979–1982	162	56	40	96	112	—	—	—	—	—
Ted Drury		C	1993–1995	50	4	11	15	31	—	—	—	—	—
Richard Dunn		D	1983–1985	76	6	24	30	32	—	—	—	—	—
Normand Dupont		L	1983–1984	40	7	15	22	12	—	—	—	—	—
Steve Dykstra		L	1989–1990	9	0	0	0	2	—	—	—	—	—
Nelson Emerson		R	1995–1997	147	38	58	96	112	—	—	—	—	—
Dean Evason		C	1984–1991	434	87	148	235	615	38	8	15	23	108
Glen Featherstone		D	1994–1997	122	5	16	21	257	—	—	—	—	—
Paul Fenton		L	1984–1986	34	7	5	12	10	—	—	—	—	—
Ray Ferraro		C	1984–1991	442	157	194	351	433	33	7	11	18	24
Michael Fidler		L	1980–1982	40	9	10	19	4	—	—	—	—	—
Nick Fotiu		L	1979–1981	116	14	11	25	186	3	0	0	0	6
Ron Francis	2007	C	1981–1991	714	264	557	821	538	33	8	14	22	20
Dan Fridgen		L	1981–1983	13	2	3	5	2	—	—	—	—	—
Mark Fusco		D	1983–1985	80	3	12	15	42	—	—	—	—	—
Michel Galarneau		C	1980–1983	78	7	10	17	34	—	—	—	—	—
William Gardner		C	1985–1987	26	1	9	10	4	—	—	—	—	—
Dallas Gaume		C	1988–1989	4	1	1	2	0	—	—	—	—	—
Robert Gavin		R	1985–1988	211	57	60	117	138	22	8	7	15	27
Randy Gilhen		C	1982–1983	2	0	1	1	0	—	—	—	—	—
Donald Gillen		R	1981–1982	34	1	4	5	22	—	—	—	—	—
Paul Gillis		C	1991–1993	33	1	3	4	88	5	0	1	1	0
Larry Giroux		D	1979–1980	47	2	5	7	44	3	0	0	0	2
Brian Glynn		D	1994–1997	98	2	10	12	78	—	—	—	—	—
Alexander Godynyuk		D	1993–1997	115	4	15	19	91	—	—	—	—	—
Christopher Govedaris		L	1989–1993	33	2	4	6	10	2	0	0	0	2
Mark Greig		R	1990–1994	74	5	17	22	64	—	—	—	—	—
Stu Grimson		L	1996–1997	75	2	2	4	218	—	—	—	—	—
Kevin Haller		D	1996–1997	35	2	6	8	48	—	—	—	—	—
Alan Hangsleben		L	1979–1980	37	3	15	18	69	—	—	—	—	—
Todd Harkins		R	1993–1994	28	1	0	1	49	—	—	—	—	—
Archie Henderson		R	1982–1983	15	2	1	3	64	—	—	—	—	—
Robert Hess		D	1983–1984	3	0	0	0	0	—	—	—	—	—
Brian Hill		C	1979–1980	19	1	1	2	4	—	—	—	—	—
Richard Hodgson		D	1979–1980	6	0	0	0	6	1	0	0	0	0
Michael Hoffman		L	1982–1986	9	1	3	4	2	—	—	—	—	—
Bobby Holik		C	1990–1992	154	42	46	88	157	13	0	1	1	13
Ed Hospodar		D	1982–1984	131	1	18	19	362	—	—	—	—	—
Doug Houda		D	1990–1994	142	6	14	20	356	12	0	2	2	21
Garry Howatt		L	1981–1982	80	18	32	50	242	—	—	—	—	—
Gordie Howe	1972	R	1979–1980	80	15	26	41	42	3	1	1	2	2
Mark Howe	2011	D	1979–1982	213	51	147	198	92	3	1	2	3	2
Marty Howe		D	1979–1985	119	1	18	19	75	3	1	1	2	0
Patrick Hughes		R	1986–1987	2	0	0	0	2	3	0	0	0	0
Bobby Hull	1983	L	1979–1980	9	2	5	7	0	3	0	0	0	0
Jody Hull		R	1988–1990	98	23	28	51	31	6	0	1	1	4
Mark Hunter		R	1990–1992	74	14	16	30	199	10	5	1	6	23
Mark Janssens		C	1992–1997	341	20	43	63	712	—	—	—	—	—
Doug Jarvis		C	1985–1988	139	17	29	46	42	16	0	3	3	8
Grant Jennings		D	1988–1991	163	7	20	27	412	11	1	0	1	34
David Jensen		C	1984–1985	13	0	4	4	6	—	—	—	—	—
Mark Johnson		C	1982–1985	201	85	118	203	76	—	—	—	—	—
Bernard Johnston		C	1979–1981	57	12	24	36	16	3	0	1	1	0
Sami Kapanen		R	1995–1997	80	18	16	34	8	—	—	—	—	—
Edward Kastelic		R	1988–1992	147	9	9	18	485	2	0	0	0	0
Dan Keczmer		D	1991–1994	36	4	5	9	40	—	—	—	—	—
Kevin Kemp		D	1980–1981	3	0	0	0	4	—	—	—	—	—
David Keon	1986	C	1979–1982	234	31	97	128	42	3	0	1	1	0
Tim Kerr		R	1992–1993	22	0	6	6	7	—	—	—	—	—
Derek King		L	1996–1997	12	3	3	6	2	—	—	—	—	—
Scot Kleinendorst		C	1984–1989	210	9	31	40	383	17	2	5	7	38
Stephen Konroyd		D	1991–1993	92	5	21	26	95	7	0	1	1	2
Chris Kotsopoulos		D	1981–1985	241	29	60	89	443	—	—	—	—	—
Robert Kron		C	1992–1997	272	70	76	146	38	—	—	—	—	—
Todd Krygier		L	1989–1991	130	31	29	60	147	13	2	3	5	4
Frantisek Kucera		D	1993–1996	94	6	26	32	54	—	—	—	—	—
Nick Kypreos		L	1992–1994	85	17	10	27	362	—	—	—	—	—
Andre Lacroix		C	1979–1980	29	3	14	17	2	—	—	—	—	—
Pierre Lacroix		D	1982–1983	56	6	25	31	18	—	—	—	—	—
Randy Ladouceur		D	1986–1993	452	12	43	55	717	33	3	8	11	53
Marc Laforge		D	1989–1990	9	0	0	0	43	—	—	—	—	—
Pierre Larouche		C	1981–1983	83	43	47	90	20	—	—	—	—	—
Paul Lawless		L	1982–1988	205	49	70	119	54	3	0	2	2	2
Brian Lawton		C	1988–1990	48	12	17	29	34	3	1	0	1	0
Jamie Leach		R	1992–1993	19	3	2	5	2	—	—	—	—	—
Jocelyn Lemieux		R	1993–1996	86	13	8	21	82	—	—	—	—	—
Curtis Leschyshyn		D	1996–1997	64	4	13	17	30	—	—	—	—	—
Richard Ley		D	1979–1981	81	4	18	22	112	—	—	—	—	—
Charles Luksa		D	1979–1980	8	0	1	1	4	—	—	—	—	—
David Lumley		R	1984–1985	48	8	20	28	98	—	—	—	—	—
Gilles Lupien		D	1980–1982	21	2	5	7	41	—	—	—	—	—
George Lyle		L	1981–1983	30	6	18	24	17	—	—	—	—	—
Paul MacDermid		R	1981–1990	373	68	83	151	744	26	5	8	13	84
Randy Macgregor		R	1981–1982	2	1	1	2	2	—	—	—	—	—
Norm MacIver		D	1988–1989	37	1	22	23	24	1	0	0	0	2
Richard Macleish		C	1981–1982	34	6	16	22	16	—	—	—	—	—
Marek Malik		D	1994–1997	55	1	6	7	54	—	—	—	—	—
Merlin Malinowski		C	1982–1983	75	5	23	28	16	—	—	—	—	—
William Malone		C	1983–1986	176	45	83	128	147	—	—	—	—	—
Don Maloney		L	1988–1989	21	3	11	14	23	4	0	0	0	8
Kent Manderville		C	1996–1997	44	6	5	11	18	—	—	—	—	—
Bryan Marchment		D	1993–1994	42	3	7	10	124	—	—	—	—	—
Paul Marshall		L	1982–1983	13	1	2	3	0	—	—	—	—	—
Tom Martin		L	1987–1990	64	9	10	19	164	1	0	0	0	4
Steve Martins		C	1995–1997	25	1	4	5	8	—	—	—	—	—
Jason McBain		D	1995–1997	9	0	0	0	0	—	—	—	—	—
Rob McClanahan		C	1981–1982	17	0	3	3	11	—	—	—	—	—
Brad McCrimmon		D	1993–1996	156	4	12	16	176	—	—	—	—	—
Girard McDonald		D	1981–1984	8	0	0	0	4	—	—	—	—	—
Mike McDougal		R	1981–1983	58	8	10	18	43	—	—	—	—	—
Mike McEwen		D	1985–1988	67	11	13	24	48	11	1	7	8	8
Robert McGill		D	1993–1994	30	0	3	3	41	—	—	—	—	—
John McIlhargey		D	1980–1982	98	2	11	13	202	—	—	—	—	—
Jim McKenzie		L	1989–1994	203	13	12	25	468	6	0	0	0	8
Richard Meagher		C	1980–1983	96	31	29	60	70	—	—	—	—	—
Glenn Merkosky		L	1981–1982	7	0	0	0	2	—	—	—	—	—
Mike Millar		R	1986–1988	38	9	9	18	6	—	—	—	—	—
Warren Miller		R	1980–1983	207	33	44	77	120	—	—	—	—	—
Chris Murray		R	1996–1997	8	1	1	2	10	—	—	—	—	—
Dana Murzyn		D	1985–1988	185	13	48	61	265	10	2	1	3	39
Donald Nachbaur		C	1980–1982	154	21	38	59	256	—	—	—	—	—
Raymond Neufeld		R	1979–1986	331	95	131	226	400	2	1	0	1	0
John Newberry		C	1985–1986	3	0	0	0	0	—	—	—	—	—
Barry Nieckar		L	1992–1993	2	0	0	0	2	—	—	—	—	—
Andrei Nikolishin		C	1994–1997	112	24	52	76	46	—	—	—	—	—
Lee Norwood		D	1991–1992	6	0	0	0	16	—	—	—	—	—
Michael Nylander		C	1992–1994	117	22	55	77	60	—	—	—	—	—
Jeff O'Neill		C	1995–1997	137	22	35	57	80	—	—	—	—	—
Jeffrey Parker		R	1990–1991	4	0	0	0	2	—	—	—	—	—
Mark Paterson		D	1982–1986	29	3	3	6	33	—	—	—	—	—
James Patrick		D	1993–1994	47	8	20	28	32	—	—	—	—	—
Jim Pavese		D	1988–1989	5	0	0	0	5	1	0	0	0	0
Allen Pedersen		D	1993–1994	7	0	0	0	9	—	—	—	—	—
Barry Pederson		C	1991–1992	5	2	2	4	0	—	—	—	—	—
Brent Peterson		C	1987–1989	118	6	20	26	101	6	0	1	1	6
Robert Petrovicky		C	1992–1995	77	9	11	20	84	—	—	—	—	—
Jorgen Pettersson		L	1985–1986	23	5	5	10	2	—	—	—	—	—
Michel Picard		L	1990–1992	30	4	5	9	8	—	—	—	—	—
Randy Pierce		R	1983–1985	34	9	5	14	17	—	—	—	—	—
Ronald Plumb		D	1979–1980	26	3	4	7	14	—	—	—	—	—
Marc Potvin		R	1993–1994	51	2	3	5	246	—	—	—	—	—
Patrick Poulin		L	1991–1994	91	22	32	54	50	7	2	1	3	0
Nolan Pratt		D	1996–1997	9	0	2	2	6	—	—	—	—	—
Keith Primeau		C	1996–1997	75	26	25	51	161	—	—	—	—	—
Chris Pronger	2015	D	1993–1995	124	10	34	44	167	—	—	—	—	—
Brian Propp		L	1993–1994	65	12	17	29	44	—	—	—	—	—
Joel Quenneville		D	1983–1990	457	25	70	95	408	26	0	7	7	18
Paul Ranheim		L	1993–1997	202	26	48	74	44	—	—	—	—	—
Mark Reeds		R	1987–1989	45	0	9	9	37	—	—	—	—	—
Mark Renaud		D	1979–1983	142	5	47	52	80	—	—	—	—	—
Steven Rice		R	1994–1997	177	42	36	78	167	—	—	—	—	—
Todd Richards		D	1990–1992	8	0	4	4	4	11	0	3	3	6
Gordon Roberts		D	1979–1981	107	10	39	49	170	3	1	1	2	2
Torrie Robertson		L	1983–1989	326	36	79	115	1,368	16	1	1	2	73
Mike Rogers		C	1979–1981	160	84	126	210	42	3	0	3	3	0
Thomas Rowe		R	1979–1982	115	23	32	55	256	3	2	0	2	0
Ulf Samuelsson		D	1984–1991	463	31	144	175	1,110	31	2	5	7	109
Geoff Sanderson		L	1990–1997	439	189	163	352	181	10	1	0	1	2
James Jr. Sandlak		R	1993–1995	40	6	2	8	32	—	—	—	—	—
Jean Savard		C	1979–1980	1	0	0	0	0	—	—	—	—	—
Maynard Schurman		L	1979–1980	7	0	0	0	0	—	—	—	—	—
David Semenko		L	1986–1987	51	4	8	12	87	4	0	0	0	15
Brendan Shanahan	2013	R	1995–1997	76	45	34	79	125	—	—	—	—	—
Daniel Shank		R	1991–1992	13	2	0	2	18	5	0	0	0	22
Brad Shaw		D	1985–1992	212	11	84	95	107	19	4	8	12	6
Neil Sheehy		D	1987–1988	26	1	4	5	116	1	0	0	0	7
Timothy Sheehy		R	1979–1980	12	2	1	3	0	—	—	—	—	—
Gord Sherven		C	1986–1988	8	0	0	0	0	—	—	—	—	—
Paul Shmyr		D	1981–1982	66	1	11	12	134	—	—	—	—	—
Risto Siltanen		D	1982–1986	277	40	118	158	122	—	—	—	—	—
Allan Sims		D	1979–1981	156	26	67	93	98	3	0	0	0	2
Stuart Smith		D	1979–1983	77	2	10	12	95	—	—	—	—	—
Kevin Smyth		L	1993–1996	58	6	8	14	31	—	—	—	—	—
Robert Stephenson		R	1979–1980	4	0	1	1	0	—	—	—	—	—
John Stevens		D	1990–1994	44	0	8	8	34	—	—	—	—	—
Jim Storm		L	1993–1995	74	6	13	19	27	—	—	—	—	—
Blaine Stoughton		L	1979–1984	357	219	158	377	160	1	0	0	0	0
Steve Stoyanovich		L	1983–1984	23	3	5	8	11	—	—	—	—	—
Doug Sulliman		L	1981–1984	221	57	72	129	73	—	—	—	—	—
Robert Sullivan		L	1982–1983	62	18	19	37	18	—	—	—	—	—
Chris Tancill		R	1990–1992	19	1	1	2	6	—	—	—	—	—
Jim Thomson		R	1988–1989	5	0	0	0	14	—	—	—	—	—
Dave Tippett		L	1983–1990	483	75	120	195	183	33	3	8	11	12
Mike Tomlak		C	1989–1994	141	15	22	37	103	10	0	1	1	4
Allan Tuer		D	1988–1990	6	0	0	0	29	—	—	—	—	—
Darren Turcotte		C	1993–1995	66	19	29	48	26	—	—	—	—	—
Sylvain Turgeon		L	1983–1989	370	178	150	328	366	25	3	7	10	16
Mike Vellucci		D	1987–1988	2	0	0	0	11	—	—	—	—	—
Pat Verbeek		R	1989–1995	433	192	211	403	1,144	20	5	6	11	78
Michael Volcan		D	1980–1983	143	7	29	36	128	—	—	—	—	—
James Warner		R	1979–1980	32	0	3	3	10	—	—	—	—	—
Eric Weinrich		D	1992–1994	87	8	30	38	78	—	—	—	—	—
Edward Weir		R	1984–1985	34	2	3	5	56	—	—	—	—	—
Glen Wesley		D	1994–1997	184	16	56	72	178	—	—	—	—	—
Trevor Wesley		D	1981–1983	100	9	19	28	169	—	—	—	—	—
Dave Williams		L	1987–1988	26	6	0	6	87	—	—	—	—	—
Carey Wilson		C	1987–1991	115	37	46	83	52	6	2	4	6	2
Terry Yake		C	1988–1993	104	24	37	61	60	6	1	1	2	16
Richard Yates		C	1983–1984	7	1	1	2	4	—	—	—	—	—
Scott Young		R	1987–1991	197	49	89	138	84	15	5	0	5	6
Zarley Zalapski		D	1990–1994	229	44	121	165	276	13	3	6	9	14
Mike Zuke		C	1983–1986	159	10	37	47	60	—	—	—	—	—

== Goaltenders ==
			Regular season							Playoffs					
Player	Team	Years	GP	W	L	T	SO	GAA	SV%	GP	W	L	SO	GAA	SV%
Richard Brodeur		1987–1988	6	4	2	0	0	2.65	0.894	4	1	3	0	3.62	0.862
Sean Burke		1992–1997	256	100	120	24	10	3.12	0.903	—	—	—	—	—	—
Corrie D'alessio		1992–1993	1	0	0	0	0	0.00	1.000	—	—	—	—	—	—
John Garrett		1979–1982	122	36	57	27	0	4.28	—	1	0	1	0	8.00	0.000
Jean-Sebastien Giguere		1996–1997	8	1	4	0	0	3.65	0.881	—	—	—	—	—	—
Mario Gosselin		1992–1994	23	5	13	1	0	4.23	0.871	—	—	—	—	—	—
Kenneth Holland		1980–1981	1	0	1	0	0	7.00	—	—	—	—	—	—	—
Mike Lenarduzzi		1992–1994	4	1	1	1	0	3.18	0.899	—	—	—	—	—	—
Michael Liut		1984–1990	253	116	111	17	13	3.36	—	17	8	7	1	3.22	0.000
Ross McKay		1990–1991	1	0	0	0	0	5.17	0.800	—	—	—	—	—	—
Gregory Millen		1981–1985	219	62	120	33	4	4.25	—	—	—	—	—	—	—
Jason Muzzatti		1995–1997	53	13	21	8	1	3.23	0.898	—	—	—	—	—	—
Frank Pietrangelo		1991–1994	54	12	27	3	0	4.10	0.871	7	3	4	0	2.68	0.922
Daryl Reaugh		1990–1991	20	7	7	1	1	3.15	0.889	—	—	—	—	—	—
Jeff Reese		1993–1996	37	9	17	4	2	3.13	0.897	—	—	—	—	—	—
Peter Sidorkiewicz		1987–1992	178	71	79	24	8	3.33	0.877	15	5	10	0	3.62	0.867
Allan Smith		1979–1980	30	11	10	8	2	3.66	—	2	0	2	0	5	0.000
Edward Staniowski		1983–1985	19	6	9	1	0	4.24	—	—	—	—	—	—	—
Michael Veisor		1980–1984	69	17	37	9	2	4.87	—	—	—	—	—	—	—
Steve Weeks		1984–1997	93	40	40	6	4	3.71	—	4	1	2	0	2.63	0.000
Kay Whitmore		1988–1992	75	23	33	10	3	3.61	0.875	3	0	2	0	4.29	0.859

== See also ==
- List of NHL players
