= 1986 Stanley Cup playoffs =

Ice hockey playoffs

Tournament details
- Dates: April 9–May 24, 1986
- Teams: 16
- Defending champions: Edmonton Oilers

Final positions
- Champions: Montreal Canadiens
- Runners-up: Calgary Flames

Tournament statistics
- Scoring leader(s): Doug Gilmour (Blues) and Bernie Federko (Blues) (21 points)

Awards
- MVP: Patrick Roy (Canadiens)

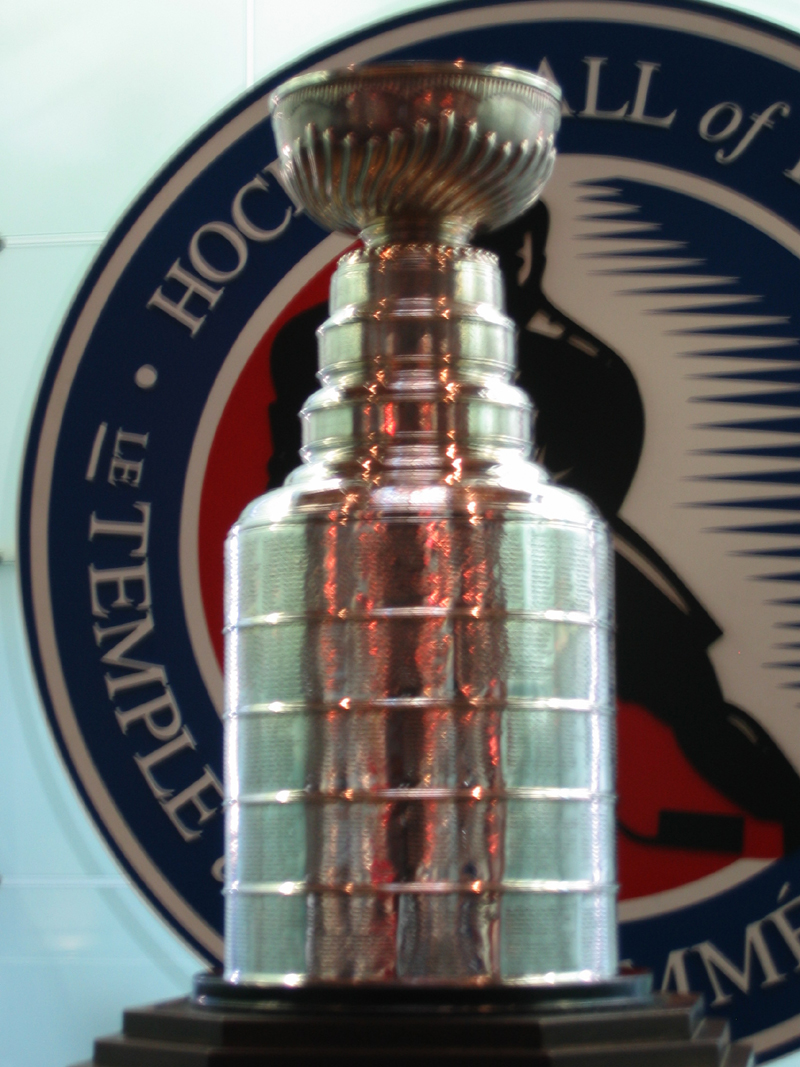
The Stanley Cup

The 1986 Stanley Cup playoffs, the playoff tournament of the National Hockey League (NHL) began on April 9, after the conclusion of the 1985–86 NHL season. The playoffs concluded on May 24 with the champion Montreal Canadiens defeating the Calgary Flames 4–3 to win the Stanley Cup in five games.

This was the last time to date that all active Canadian teams have qualified in the same season and also the second time that all seven active teams at the time qualified, the first occurring three years earlier. The 1986 playoffs saw three first place teams eliminated in the opening round and the fourth, Edmonton, bowed out in the second. This was the last time that all six Sutter brothers participated in the playoffs in the same year.

In the first round, six of the eight series ended in a three-game sweep. The only two first-round series that did not were the Rangers over the Flyers, and the Blues over the North Stars, both going the full five games.

The Montreal Canadiens decided to go with a rookie goaltender by the name of Patrick Roy. This decision proved to be a good one just like when the Canadiens rode rookie goalie Ken Dryden to a Stanley Cup championship in 1971. In the Stanley Cup Final, the Canadiens beat the Calgary Flames, who were also riding a rookie netminder, Mike Vernon. Patrick Roy won the Conn Smythe Trophy as the playoff MVP and had a sparkling 1.92 goals against average along with 15 wins. St. Louis forwards Doug Gilmour and Bernie Federko led the playoffs in scoring with 21 points despite missing the finals; this feat was not repeated until 1999.

The 1986 playoffs marked the first time that all four former WHA teams made the playoffs in the same year. This would happen again the following year and in 1999, by which time 3 of those teams had moved, the Quebec Nordiques to Denver, the Winnipeg Jets to Phoenix, and the Hartford Whalers to Raleigh.

== Playoff seeds ==
The top four teams in each division qualified for the playoffs, as follows:

=== Prince of Wales Conference ===
==== Adams Division ====
1. Quebec Nordiques, Adams Division champions – 92 points
2. Montreal Canadiens – 87 points
3. Boston Bruins – 86 points
4. Hartford Whalers – 84 points

==== Patrick Division ====
1. Philadelphia Flyers, Patrick Division champions, Prince of Wales Conference regular season champions – 110 points
2. Washington Capitals – 107 points
3. New York Islanders – 90 points
4. New York Rangers – 78 points

=== Clarence Campbell Conference ===
==== Norris Division ====
1. Chicago Black Hawks, Norris Division champions – 86 points
2. Minnesota North Stars – 85 points
3. St. Louis Blues – 83 points
4. Toronto Maple Leafs – 57 points

==== Smythe Division ====
1. Edmonton Oilers, Smythe Division champions, Clarence Campbell Conference regular season champions, Presidents' Trophy winners – 119 points
2. Calgary Flames – 89 points
3. Winnipeg Jets – 59 points (26 wins)
4. Vancouver Canucks – 59 points (23 wins)

== Playoff bracket ==
In the division semifinals, the fourth seeded team in each division played against the division winner from their division. The other series matched the second and third place teams from the divisions. The two winning teams from each division's semifinals then met in the division finals. The two division winners of each conference then played in the conference finals. The two conference winners then advanced to the Stanley Cup Final. This was the first postseason since the 1981-82 realignment that home ice advantage was awarded to the team that had the better regular season record for all four rounds of the playoffs.

Each division semifinals series was competed in a best-of-five playoff following a 2–2–1 format (scores in the bracket indicate the number of games won in each series), with the team with home ice advantage playing at home for games one and two (and game five, if necessary), and the other team playing at home for game three (and game four, if necessary). In the other three rounds, each series was competed in a best-of-seven playoff following a 2–2–1–1–1 format, with the team with home ice advantage playing at home for games one and two (and games five and seven, if necessary), and the other team playing at home for games three and four (and game six, if necessary).

The Stanley Cup Final was changed back to a 2–2–1–1–1 format after using a 2-3-2 format (with the sites of games five and six switched) during the previous two Finals.

Division semifinals | Division finals
A1 | Quebec | 0
A4 | Hartford | 3
A4 | Hartford | 3
A2 | Montreal | 4
A2 | Montreal | 3
A3 | Boston | 0
Prince of Wales Conference
P1 | Philadelphia | 2
P4 | NY Rangers | 3
P4 | NY Rangers | 4
P2 | Washington | 2
P2 | Washington | 3
P3 | NY Islanders | 0
N1 | Chicago | 0
N4 | Toronto | 3
N4 | Toronto | 3
N3 | St. Louis | 4
N2 | Minnesota | 2
N3 | St. Louis | 3
Clarence Campbell Conference
S1 | Edmonton | 3
S4 | Vancouver | 0
S1 | Edmonton | 3
S2 | Calgary | 4
S2 | Calgary | 3
S3 | Winnipeg | 0

Conference finals
A2 | Montreal | 4
P4 | NY Rangers | 1
N3 | St. Louis | 3
S2 | Calgary | 4

Stanley Cup Final
A2 | Montreal | 4
S2 | Calgary | 1

== Division semifinals ==
=== Prince of Wales Conference ===
==== (A1) Quebec Nordiques vs. (A4) Hartford Whalers ====
This was the first NHL playoff series between these two teams. When both were in the WHA, the Nordiques beat the Whalers 4 games to 1 in the 1977 quarterfinals and the Whalers beat the Nordiques 4 games to 1 in the 1978 WHA semifinals.

This was Hartford's lone playoff series victory in their NHL history prior to moving to Carolina.

| April 9 | Hartford Whalers | 3–2 | OT | Quebec Nordiques | Quebec Coliseum | Recap |
| Dean Evason (1) – 19:11 | | First period | | 02:44 – pp – Anton Stastny (1) |
| No scoring | | Second period | | No scoring |
| John Anderson (1) – pp – 09:29 | | Third period | | 12:47 – Brent Ashton (1) |
| Sylvain Turgeon (1) – 02:36 | | First overtime period | | No scoring |
| Mike Liut 37 saves / 39 shots | | Goalie stats | | Clint Malarchuk 34 saves / 37 shots |

| April 10 | Hartford Whalers | 4–1 | Quebec Nordiques | Quebec Coliseum | Recap |
| Stew Gavin (1) – 03:53; Paul MacDermid (1) – 08:51 | | First period | No scoring |
| Paul MacDermid (2) – 08:22 | | Second period | No scoring |
| Torrie Robertson (1) – 16:32 | | Third period | 01:39 – Alain Cote (1) |
| Mike Liut 26 saves / 27 shots | | Goalie stats | Clint Malarchuk 27 saves / 31 shots |

| April 12 | Quebec Nordiques | 4–9 | Hartford Whalers | Hartford Civic Center | Recap |
| Alain Lemieux (1) – pp – 08:40; Brent Ashton – sh – 15:52 | | First period | 02:29 – pp – Kevin Dineen (1); 05:22 – sh – Dave Tippett (1); 15:08 – Ron Francis (1); 19:20 – pp – Ray Ferraro (1) |
| Michel Goulet (1) – pp – 11:06 | | Second period | 02:07 – Ulf Samuelsson (1); 13:08 – pp – Ray Ferraro (2); 13:34 – pp – John Anderson (2) |
| Mark Kumpel (1) – 11:19 | | Third period | 07:00 – John Anderson (3); 18:23 – Kevin Dineen (2) |
| Mario Gosselin 17 saves / 22 shots Clint Malarchuk 9 saves / 13 shots | | Goalie stats | Mike Liut 29 saves / 33 shots |

| Hartford won series 3–0 |

==== (A2) Montreal Canadiens vs. (A3) Boston Bruins ====
This was the 21st playoff matchup and the third of nine consecutive playoff meetings between these two teams, with Montreal winning 18 of the 20 previous series. Montreal won the previous year in five games.

Bob Gainey scored his second goal of game three with 11:02 left in the third period to complete the series sweep for the Canadiens.

| April 9 | Boston Bruins | 1–3 | Montreal Canadiens | Montreal Forum | Recap |
| No scoring | | First period | No scoring |
| No scoring | | Second period | 06:53 -pp – Bobby Smith (1); 11:28 – Bobby Smith (2); 16:30 – Mike McPhee (1) |
| Gord Kluzak (1) – pp – 14:46 | | Third period | No scoring |
| Pat Riggin 20 saves / 23 shots | | Goalie stats | Patrick Roy 25 saves / 26 shots |

| April 10 | Boston Bruins | 2–3 | Montreal Canadiens | Montreal Forum | Recap |
| No scoring | | First period | No scoring |
| No scoring | | Second period | 11:38 – Stephane Richer (1); 16:56 – pp – Claude Lemieux (1) |
| Barry Pederson (1) – 12:15; Keith Crowder (1) – 12:56 | | Third period | 17:33 – pp – Claude Lemieux (2) |
| Bill Ranford 21 saves / 24 shots | | Goalie stats | Patrick Roy 19 saves / 21 shots |

| April 12 | Montreal Canadiens | 4–3 | Boston Bruins | Boston Garden | Recap |
| No scoring | | First period | 17:56 – sh – Steve Kasper (1) |
| Claude Lemieux (3) – 02:13; Mats Naslund (1) – 10:09 | | Second period | 15:02 – pp – Reed Larson (1); 15:16 – Keith Crowder (2) |
| Bob Gainey (1) – 00:50; Bob Gainey (2) – sh – 08:58 | | Third period | No scoring |
| Patrick Roy 28 saves / 31 shots | | Goalie stats | Bill Ranford 16 saves / 20 shots |

| Montreal won series 3–0 |

==== (P1) Philadelphia Flyers vs. (P4) New York Rangers ====
This was the seventh playoff series meeting between these two teams. The teams had split their previous six meetings. Philadelphia won last year's Patrick Division Semifinals in a three-game sweep.

| April 9 | New York Rangers | 6–2 | Philadelphia Flyers | Spectrum | Recap |
| Mike Ridley (1) – pp – 05:03; Bob Brooke (1) – sh – 14:11 | | First period | 09:48 – Rich Sutter (1); 14:44 – pp – Dave Poulin (1) |
| Mike Ridley (2) – pp – 08:45; Ron Greschner (1) – 10:39 | | Second period | No scoring |
| Bob Brooke (2) – 00:57; Kelly Miller (1) – sh – 06:02 | | Third period | No scoring |
| John Vanbiesbrouck 31 saves / 33 shots | | Goalie stats | Bob Froese 16 saves / 22 shots |

| April 10 | New York Rangers | 1–2 | Philadelphia Flyers | Spectrum | Recap |
| No scoring | | First period | 10:54 – Rich Sutter (2); 11:10 – Brad McCrimmon (1) |
| Pierre Larouche (1) – pp – 00:49 | | Second period | No scoring |
| No scoring | | Third period | No scoring |
| John Vanbiesbrouck 42 saves / 44 shots | | Goalie stats | Bob Froese 11 saves / 12 shots |

| April 12 | Philadelphia Flyers | 2–5 | New York Rangers | Madison Square Garden | Recap |
| Tim Kerr (1) – 12:34 | | First period | 09:38 – Ron Greschner (2) |
| Ilkka Sinisalo (1) – 04:54 | | Second period | No scoring |
| No scoring | | Third period | 08:13 – Mike Ridley (3); 12:29 – pp – Jim Wiemer (1); 12:43 – Bob Brooke (3); 13:07 – Ron Greschner (3) |
| Bob Froese 28 saves / 32 shots Glenn Resch 0 saves / 1 shots | | Goalie stats | John Vanbiesbrouck 30 saves / 32 shots |

| April 13 | Philadelphia Flyers | 7–1 | New York Rangers | Madison Square Garden | Recap |
| Peter Zezel (1) – 15:44; Peter Zezel (2) – pp – 18:36 | | First period | 04:15 – pp – Pierre Larouche (2) |
| Dave Poulin (2) – 00:16; Tim Kerr (2) – 01:01; Peter Zezel (3) – 05:17; Rick Tocchet (1) – 06:24; Tim Kerr (3) – pp – 17:20 | | Second period | No scoring |
| No scoring | | Third period | No scoring |
| Bob Froese 31 saves / 32 shots | | Goalie stats | Glen Hanlon 11 saves / 13 shots John Vanbiesbrouck 13 saves / 18 shots |

| April 15 | New York Rangers | 5–2 | Philadelphia Flyers | Spectrum | Recap |
| Pierre Larouche (3) – 11:36 | | First period | No scoring |
| Willie Huber (1) – 09:45; Mark Osborne (1) – 10:56 | | Second period | 06:26 – Ilkka Sinisalo (2) |
| Kelly Miller (2) – en – 19:20; Don Maloney (1) – en – 19:43 | | Third period | 11:36 – Brad McCrimmon (2) |
| John Vanbiesbrouck 34 saves / 36 shots | | Goalie stats | Bob Froese 22 saves / 25 shots |

| New York won series 3–2 |

==== (P2) Washington Capitals vs. (P3) New York Islanders ====
This was the fourth playoff series between these two teams. The New York Islanders won all three previous meetings over the past three seasons. New York won last year's Patrick Division Semifinals 3–2.

| April 9 | New York Islanders | 1–3 | Washington Capitals | Capital Centre | Recap |
| Clark Gillies (1) – 16:25 | | First period | 10:12 – Gaetan Duchesne (1) |
| No scoring | | Second period | 11:46 – Bobby Carpenter (1) |
| No scoring | | Third period | 12:16 – Dave Christian (1) |
| Kelly Hrudey 33 saves / 36 shots | | Goalie stats | Pete Peeters 32 saves / 33 shots |

| April 10 | New York Islanders | 2–5 | Washington Capitals | Capital Centre | Recap |
| Pat LaFontaine (1) – pp – 19:48 | | First period | 06:22 – Gaetan Duchesne (2) |
| Bryan Trottier (1) – 18:26 | | Second period | 04:22 – Greg Smith (1); 18:35 – Scott Stevens (1) |
| No scoring | | Third period | 00:58 – Bobby Gould (1); 19:45 – en – Bobby Gould (2) |
| Billy Smith 29 saves / 33 shots | | Goalie stats | Pete Peeters 27 saves / 29 shots |

| April 12 | Washington Capitals | 3–1 | New York Islanders | Nassau Coliseum | Recap |
| Rod Langway (1) – pp – 13:20 | | First period | No scoring |
| Scott Stevens (2) – pp – 07:18; Larry Murphy (1) – pp – 15:08 | | Second period | No scoring |
| No scoring | | Third period | 05:12 – Mike Bossy (1) |
| Pete Peeters 27 saves / 28 shots | | Goalie stats | Kelly Hrudey 20 saves / 23 shots |

| Washington won series 3–0 |

=== Clarence Campbell Conference ===
==== (N1) Chicago Black Hawks vs. (N4) Toronto Maple Leafs ====
This was the seventh playoff series meeting between these two teams. Toronto won four of the previous six meetings. Their last meeting was in the 1967 Stanley Cup Semifinals, in which Toronto won in six games.

| April 9 | Toronto Maple Leafs | 5–3 | Chicago Black Hawks | Chicago Stadium | Recap |
| Steve Thomas (1) – pp – 03:46; Wendel Clark (1) – 17:22 | | First period | 11:49 – Doug Wilson (1) |
| No scoring | | Second period | No scoring |
| Gary Leeman (1) – 06:09; Walt Poddubny (1) – 09:28; Steve Thomas (2) – pp – 17:47 | | Third period | 04:48 – pp – Darryl Sutter (1); 18:29 – Tom Lysiak (1) |
| Ken Wregget 35 saves / 38 shots | | Goalie stats | Bob Sauve 32 saves / 37 shots |

| April 10 | Toronto Maple Leafs | 6–4 | Chicago Black Hawks | Chicago Stadium | Recap |
| Dan Daoust (1) – 04:01; Steve Thomas (3) – pp – 15:46 | | First period | 09:58 – pp – Denis Savard (1); 19:28 – pp – Denis Savard (2) |
| Wendel Clark (2) – 16:09 | | Second period | 01:04 – Denis Savard (3); 14:57 – Denis Savard (4) |
| Peter Ihnacak (1) – 14:10; Walt Poddubny (2) – 19:04; Steve Thomas (4) – en – 19:39 | | Third period | No scoring |
| Ken Wregget 42 saves / 46 shots | | Goalie stats | Bob Sauve 20 saves / 23 shots Murray Bannerman 6 saves / 8 shots |

| April 12 | Chicago Black Hawks | 2–7 | Toronto Maple Leafs | Maple Leaf Gardens | Recap |
| No scoring | | First period | 02:15 – Russ Courtnall (1); 19:53 – pp – Rick Vaive (1) |
| Ken Yaremchuk (1) – 17:41; Tom Lysiak (2) – 17:59 | | Second period | 09:41 – Tom Fergus (1); 11:27 – Miroslav Frycer (1); 16:46 – Wendel Clark (3) |
| No scoring | | Third period | 09:03 – Walt Poddubny (3); 12:56 – pp – Russ Courtnall (2) |
| Murray Bannerman 25 saves / 32 shots | | Goalie stats | Ken Wregget 22 saves / 24 shots |

| Toronto won series 3–0 |

==== (N2) Minnesota North Stars vs. (N3) St. Louis Blues ====
This was the seventh playoff series meeting between these two teams. Both teams split their previous six series. Minnesota won last year's Norris Division Semifinals in a three-game sweep.

In game three, Bernie Federko scored twice in the third period, the second with just over twelve minutes remaining, to give the Blues a 4–3 comeback win over the North Stars and a 2–1 series lead.

| April 9 | St. Louis Blues | 2–1 | Minnesota North Stars | Met Center | Recap |
| No scoring | | First period | No scoring |
| Lee Norwood (1) – 04:53 | | Second period | 13:58 – Dirk Graham (1) |
| Doug Gilmour (1) – sh – 07:06 | | Third period | No scoring |
| Rick Wamsley 27 saves / 28 shots | | Goalie stats | Don Beaupre 28 saves / 30 shots |

| April 10 | St. Louis Blues | 2–6 | Minnesota North Stars | Met Center | Recap |
| Doug Gilmour (2) – 06:35 | | First period | 05:32 – Tony McKegney (1); 12:03 – Brian Bellows (1); 12:42 – Dirk Graham (2) |
| Bernie Federko (1) – 19:01 | | Second period | No scoring |
| No scoring | | Third period | 04:05 – Dennis Maruk (1); 09:54 – Brian Bellows (2); 18:42 – Dennis Maruk (2) |
| Rick Wamsley 28 saves / 34 shots | | Goalie stats | Don Beaupre 29 saves / 31 shots |

| April 12 | Minnesota North Stars | 3–4 | St. Louis Blues | St. Louis Arena | Recap |
| Neal Broten (1) – pp – 14:52; Dennis Maruk (3) – pp – 16:38 | | First period | 07:09 – Greg Paslawski (1) |
| Kent Nilsson (1) – 03:27 | | Second period | 17:16 – Greg Paslawski (2) |
| No scoring | | Third period | 00:27 – Bernie Federko (2); 07:57 – Bernie Federko (3) |
| Don Beaupre 27 saves / 31 shots | | Goalie stats | Greg Millen 30 saves / 33 shots |

| April 13 | Minnesota North Stars | 7–4 | St. Louis Blues | St. Louis Arena | Recap |
| Neal Broten (2) – 08:07; Neal Broten (3) – 08:30; Brian Bellows (3) – pp – 18:33 | | First period | 02:20 – pp – Mark Hunter (1); 11:21 – Gino Cavallini (1); 15:28 – Kevin LaVallee (1) |
| Brian Bellows (4) – pp – 02:54; Dirk Graham (3) – sh – 06:50; Tony McKegney (2) – 15:35 | | Second period | No scoring |
| Dennis Maruk (4) – en – 18:57 | | Third period | 13:26 – Mark Hunter (2) |
| Don Beaupre 34 saves / 38 shots | | Goalie stats | Rick Wamsley 29 saves / 35 shots |

| April 15 | St. Louis Blues | 6–3 | Minnesota North Stars | Met Center | Recap |
| Lee Norwood (2) – 10:18; Greg Paslawski (3) – pp – 13:33 | | First period | 02:53 – Ron Wilson (1); 04:40 – pp – Brian Bellows (5) |
| Greg Paslawski (4) – 00:38 | | Second period | No scoring |
| Eddy Beers (1) – 03:50; Greg Paslawski (5) – 16:38; Bernie Federko (4) – en – 19:50 | | Third period | 15:13 – pp – Ron Wilson (2) |
| Greg Millen 35 saves / 38 shots | | Goalie stats | Don Beaupre 22 saves / 27 shots |

| St. Louis won series 3–2 |

==== (S1) Edmonton Oilers vs. (S4) Vancouver Canucks ====
This was the first playoff series between these two teams.

| April 9 | Vancouver Canucks | 3–7 | Edmonton Oilers | Northlands Coliseum | Recap |
| Brent Peterson (1) – pp – 07:41 | | First period | 00:38 – Glenn Anderson (1); 02:06 – pp – Paul Coffey (1); 12:20 – Wayne Gretzky (1) |
| Thomas Gradin (1) – 06:21 | | Second period | No scoring |
| Patrik Sundstrom (1) – pp – 07:47 | | Third period | 04:27 – pp – Mike Krushelnyski (1); 05:09 – Kevin Lowe (1); 10:49 – Mike Krushelnyski (2); 17:23 – Kevin McClelland (1) |
| Richard Brodeur 31 saves / 38 shots | | Goalie stats | Grant Fuhr 28 saves / 31 shots |

| April 10 | Vancouver Canucks | 1–5 | Edmonton Oilers | Northlands Coliseum | Recap |
| No scoring | | First period | 00:33 – Mark Messier (1); 01:39 – pp – Wayne Gretzky (2); 11:01 – Glenn Anderson (2) |
| Brent Peterson (2) – 06:33 | | Second period | 12:53 – Raimo Summanen (1) |
| No scoring | | Third period | 06:29 – Jari Kurri (1) |
| Wendell Young 27 saves / 32 shots | | Goalie stats | Andy Moog 26 saves / 27 shots |

| April 12 | Edmonton Oilers | 5–1 | Vancouver Canucks | Pacific Coliseum | Recap |
| Mark Messier (2) – sh – 07:44; Mike Krushelnyski (3) – 12:58 | | First period | No scoring |
| Dave Hunter (1) – 10:37 | | Second period | No scoring |
| Wayne Gretzky (3) – pp – 04:38; Esa Tikkanen (1) – 11:28 | | Third period | 01:09 – Thomas Gradin (2) |
| Grant Fuhr 21 saves / 22 shots | | Goalie stats | Richard Brodeur 36 saves / 41 shots |

| Edmonton won series 3–0 |

==== (S2) Calgary Flames vs. (S3) Winnipeg Jets ====
This was the second playoff series between these two teams. This was a rematch of last year's Smythe Division Semifinals, in which Winnipeg won 3–1.

| April 9 | Winnipeg Jets | 1–5 | Calgary Flames | Olympic Saddledome | Recap |
| Mario Marois (1) – pp – 15:29 | | First period | 12:02 – Lanny McDonald (1); 16:14 – Joe Mullen (1) |
| No scoring | | Second period | 01:42 – John Tonelli (1); 05:22 – pp – Paul Reinhart (1); 13:05 – Jim Peplinski (1) |
| No scoring | | Third period | No scoring |
| Dan Bouchard 17 saves / 22 shots Brian Hayward 6 saves / 6 shots | | Goalie stats | Mike Vernon 22 saves / 23 shots |

| April 10 | Winnipeg Jets | 4–6 | Calgary Flames | Olympic Saddledome | Recap |
| No scoring | | First period | 03:25 – Al MacInnis (1); 07:15 – Doug Risebrough (1) |
| Ray Neufeld (1) – 06:16; Bill Derlago (1) – 11:40 | | Second period | 07:40 – Joe Mullen (2); 11:09 – Paul Reinhart (2); 17:15 – John Tonelli (2) |
| Doug Smail (1) – 03:50; Thomas Steen (1) – sh – 12:35 | | Third period | 07:44 – Lanny McDonald (2) |
| Brian Hayward 19 saves / 25 shots Marc Behrend 7 saves / 7 shots | | Goalie stats | Mike Vernon 33 saves / 37 shots |

| April 12 | Calgary Flames | 4–3 | OT | Winnipeg Jets | Winnipeg Arena | Recap |
| Doug Risebrough (2) – 05:09; Joe Mullen (3) – 08:52 | | First period | | 16:49 – pp – Ray Neufeld (2) |
| No scoring | | Second period | | No scoring |
| Al MacInnis (2) – pp – 18:17 | | Third period | | 05:43 – Paul MacLean (1); 13:05 – pp – Brian Mullen (1) |
| Lanny McDonald (3) – 08:25 | | First overtime period | | No scoring |
| Mike Vernon 29 saves / 32 shots | | Goalie stats | | Daniel Berthiaume 39 saves / 43 shots |

| Calgary won series 3–0 |

== Division finals ==
=== Prince of Wales Conference ===
==== (A2) Montreal Canadiens vs. (A4) Hartford Whalers ====
This was the second playoff series between these two teams. Montreal won the only previous meeting in a three-game sweep in the 1980 preliminary round.

The upstart Whalers pushed the eventual Stanley Cup champions to the limit before falling. Claude Lemieux scored the series-winning overtime goal for Montreal.

| April 17 | Hartford Whalers | 4–1 | Montreal Canadiens | Montreal Forum | Recap |
| No scoring | | First period | No scoring |
| Stew Gavin (2) – 04:24; Sylvain Turgeon (2) – 06:44; John Anderson (4) – pp – 17:21 | | Second period | No scoring |
| Stew Gavin (3) – en – 19:02 | | Third period | 10:42 – pp – Chris Nilan (1) |
| Mike Liut 26 saves / 27 shots | | Goalie stats | Patrick Roy 19 saves / 22 shots |

| April 19 | Hartford Whalers | 1–3 | Montreal Canadiens | Montreal Forum | Recap |
| No scoring | | First period | 12:33 – pp – Stephane Richer (2); 17:04 – Guy Carbonneau (1) |
| Ray Ferraro (3) – pp – 07:17 | | Second period | 06:12 – Guy Carbonneau (2) |
| No scoring | | Third period | No scoring |
| Mike Liut 27 saves / 30 shots | | Goalie stats | Patrick Roy 24 saves / 25 shots |

| April 21 | Montreal Canadiens | 4–1 | Hartford Whalers | Hartford Civic Center | Recap |
| Kjell Dahlin (1) – 04:48; Stephane Richer (3) – pp – 18:43 | | First period | No scoring |
| Claude Lemieux (4) – 04:09 | | Second period | 04:41 – Dave Tippett (2) |
| Guy Carbonneau (3) – en – 18:38 | | Third period | No scoring |
| Patrick Roy 20 saves / 21 shots | | Goalie stats | Steve Weeks 13 saves / 15 shots Mike Liut 5 saves / 6 shots |

| April 23 | Montreal Canadiens | 1–2 | OT | Hartford Whalers | Hartford Civic Center | Recap |
| No scoring | | First period | | 13:53 – Stew Gavin (4) |
| No scoring | | Second period | | No scoring |
| Mats Naslund (2) – pp – 12:22 | | Third period | | No scoring |
| No scoring | | First overtime period | | 01:07 – Kevin Dineen (3) |
| Patrick Roy 22 saves / 24 shots | | Goalie stats | | Steve Weeks 18 saves / 19 shots |

| April 25 | Hartford Whalers | 3–5 | Montreal Canadiens | Montreal Forum | Recap |
| Kevin Dineen (4) – 15:46 | | First period | 02:05 – pp – Claude Lemieux (5); 08:26 – sh – Guy Carbonneau (4); 12:44 – pp – Mats Naslund (3) |
| Kevin Dineen (5) – 14:14 | | Second period | 16:03 – Mike Lalor (1) |
| John Anderson (5) – 09:58 | | Third period | 18:41 – Guy Carbonneau (5) |
| Steve Weeks 25 saves / 30 shots | | Goalie stats | Patrick Roy 20 saves / 23 shots |

| April 27 | Montreal Canadiens | 0–1 | Hartford Whalers | Hartford Civic Center | Recap |
| No scoring | | First period | No scoring |
| No scoring | | Second period | 07:30 – Kevin Dineen (6) |
| No scoring | | Third period | No scoring |
| Patrick Roy 16 saves / 17 shots | | Goalie stats | Mike Liut 32 saves / 32 shots |

| April 29 | Hartford Whalers | 1–2 | OT | Montreal Canadiens | Montreal Forum | Recap |
| No scoring | | First period | | 18:47 – sh – Mike McPhee (2) |
| No scoring | | Second period | | No scoring |
| Dave Babych (1) – 17:12 | | Third period | | No scoring |
| No scoring | | First overtime period | | 05:55 – Claude Lemieux (6) |
| Mike Liut 30 saves / 32 shots | | Goalie stats | | Patrick Roy 24 saves / 25 shots |

| Montreal won series 4–3 |

==== (P2) Washington Capitals vs. (P4) New York Rangers ====
This was the first playoff series between these two teams.

| April 17 | New York Rangers | 4–3 | OT | Washington Capitals | Capital Centre | Recap |
| Brian MacLellan (1) – 11:48 | | First period | | 08:46 – Dave Christian (2); 12:39 – Bobby Gould (3) |
| Mark Osborne (2) – sh – 17:33 | | Second period | | 06:39 – Alan Haworth (1) |
| Mike Ridley (4) – 09:37 | | Third period | | No scoring |
| Brian MacLellan (2) – 01:16 | | First overtime period | | No scoring |
| John Vanbiesbrouck 24 saves / 27 shots | | Goalie stats | | Pete Peeters 19 saves / 23 shots |

| April 19 | New York Rangers | 1–8 | Washington Capitals | Capital Centre | Recap |
| No scoring | | First period | 09:27 – Mike Gartner (1); 11:38 – Craig Laughlin (1); 19:03 – Alan Haworth (2) |
| Larry Melnyk (1) – 05:12 | | Second period | 06:46 – Gaetan Duchesne (3); 14:08 – sh – Gaetan Duchesne (4) |
| No scoring | | Third period | 03:00 – pp – Jorgen Pettersson (1); 11:19 – pp – Alan Haworth (3); 13:22 – Greg Adams (1) |
| John Vanbiesbrouck 21 saves / 26 shots Glen Hanlon 10 saves / 13 shots | | Goalie stats | Pete Peeters 19 saves / 20 shots |

| April 21 | Washington Capitals | 6–3 | New York Rangers | Madison Square Garden | Recap |
| Bobby Carpenter (2) – 03:06; Mike Gartner (2) – 06:45 | | First period | No scoring |
| Bobby Carpenter (3) – 02:42; John Barrett (1) – 04:09 | | Second period | No scoring |
| John Barrett (2) – 04:37; Alan Haworth (4) – 09:44 | | Third period | 04:08 – pp – Pierre Larouche (4); 07:50 – pp – Wilf Paiement (1); 17:56 – Pierre Larouche (5) |
| Pete Peeters 39 saves / 42 shots | | Goalie stats | John Vanbiesbrouck 22 saves / 28 shots |

| April 23 | Washington Capitals | 5–6 | OT | New York Rangers | Madison Square Garden | Recap |
| Dave Christian (3) – 07:15; Kevin Hatcher (1) – 10:49; Bobby Carpenter (4) – pp – 13:19 | | First period | | 06:47 – pp – Wilf Paiement (2) |
| Bobby Gould (4) – 18:59 | | Second period | | 04:42 – Mike Ridley (5); 08:29 – Tomas Sandstrom (1) |
| Greg Smith (2) – sh – 07:45 | | Third period | | 08:09 – pp – Willie Huber (2); 17:25 – Bob Brooke (3) |
| No scoring | | First overtime period | | 02:40 – Bob Brooke (4) |
| Pete Peeters 24 saves / 30 shots | | Goalie stats | | John Vanbiesbrouck 24 saves / 29 shots |

| April 25 | New York Rangers | 4–2 | Washington Capitals | Capital Centre | Recap |
| Pierre Larouche (6) – 04:05; Wilf Paiement (3) – pp – 13:40 | | First period | 02:51 – pp – Dave Christian (4); 03:34 – pp – Scott Stevens (3) |
| Tomas Sandstrom (2) – 13:49 | | Second period | No scoring |
| Don Maloney (2) – 02:12 | | Third period | No scoring |
| John Vanbiesbrouck 30 saves / 32 shots | | Goalie stats | Pete Peeters 23 saves / 27 shots |

| April 27 | Washington Capitals | 1–2 | New York Rangers | Madison Square Garden | Recap |
| No scoring | | First period | 12:36 – Pierre Larouche (7) |
| No scoring | | Second period | No scoring |
| Bobby Carpenter (5) – pp – 05:38 | | Third period | 00:34 – pp – Pierre Larouche (8) |
| Pete Peeters 19 saves / 21 shots | | Goalie stats | John Vanbiesbrouck 27 saves / 28 shots |

| New York Rangers won series 4–2 |

=== Clarence Campbell Conference ===
==== (N3) St. Louis Blues vs. (N4) Toronto Maple Leafs ====
This was the first playoff series between these two teams.

In the series-deciding game seven, Kevin LaVallee scored the game-winning goal with just under twelve-and-a-half minutes left to send the Blues to the conference finals.

| April 18 | Toronto Maple Leafs | 1–6 | St. Louis Blues | St. Louis Arena | Recap |
| No scoring | | First period | 16:19 – pp – Dave Barr (1) |
| Wendel Clark (4) – pp – 08:04 | | Second period | 02:40 – Gino Cavallini (2); 02:47 – Ron Flockhart (1) |
| No scoring | | Third period | 05:28 – Charlie Bourgeois (1); 11:49 – pp – Greg Paslawski (6); 14:04 – pp – Charlie Bourgeois (2) |
| Ken Wregget 30 saves / 36 shots | | Goalie stats | Greg Millen 23 saves / 24 shots |

| April 20 | Toronto Maple Leafs | 3–0 | St. Louis Blues | St. Louis Arena | Recap |
| No scoring | | First period | No scoring |
| Peter Ihnacak (2) – 09:14 | | Second period | No scoring |
| Tom Fergus (2) – pp – 04:56; Borje Salming (1) – 18:47 | | Third period | No scoring |
| Ken Wregget 35 saves / 35 shots | | Goalie stats | Greg Millen 36 saves / 38 shots |

| April 22 | St. Louis Blues | 2–5 | Toronto Maple Leafs | Maple Leaf Gardens | Recap |
| Doug Gilmour (3) – 05:26 | | First period | 19:05 – Rick Vaive (2) |
| Greg Paslawski (7) – 11:25 | | Second period | No scoring |
| No scoring | | Third period | 00:40 – pp – Tom Fergus (3); 13:49 – Wendel Clark (5); 15:15 – Rick Vaive (3); 15:31 – Russ Courtnall (3) |
| Rick Wamsley 20 saves / 25 shots | | Goalie stats | Ken Wregget 25 saves / 27 shots |

| April 24 | St. Louis Blues | 7–4 | Toronto Maple Leafs | Maple Leaf Gardens | Recap |
| Herb Raglan (1) – 03:41; Mark Hunter (3) – pp – 12:33 | | First period | 06:38 – pp – Rick Vaive (4); 18:20 – Chris Kotsopoulos (1) |
| Doug Gilmour (4) – sh – 04:55; Mark Reeds (1) – 08:41 | | Second period | 15:09 – pp – Tom Fergus (4) |
| Doug Gilmour (5) – 00:47; Rick Meagher (1) – 04:28; Rick Meagher (2) – en – 19:36 | | Third period | 09:03 – pp – Brad Smith (1) |
| Greg Millen 36 saves / 40 shots | | Goalie stats | Ken Wregget 27 saves / 33 shots |

| April 26 | Toronto Maple Leafs | 3–4 | OT | St. Louis Blues | St. Louis Arena | Recap |
| Rick Vaive (5) – pp – 09:53; Gary Leeman (2) – 17:54 | | First period | | No scoring |
| Rick Vaive (6) – 00:53 | | Second period | | 07:09 – Greg Paslawski (8); 13:42 – Ric Nattress (1) |
| No scoring | | Third period | | 10:25 – Bernie Federko (5) |
| No scoring | | First overtime period | | 07:11 – Mark Reeds (2) |
| Ken Wregget 31 saves / 35 shots | | Goalie stats | | Greg Millen 38 saves / 41 shots |

| April 28 | St. Louis Blues | 3–5 | Toronto Maple Leafs | Maple Leaf Gardens | Recap |
| Doug Gilmour (6) – pp – 00:51; Doug Gilmour (7) – 19:10 | | First period | 13:51 – Tom Fergus (5) |
| Mark Hunter (4) – 17:32 | | Second period | 09:18 – Steve Thomas (5) |
| No scoring | | Third period | 01:16 – Steve Thomas (6); 12:25 – Walt Poddubny (4); 19:16 – en – Dan Daoust (2) |
| Greg Millen 25 saves / 29 shots | | Goalie stats | Ken Wregget 21 saves / 24 shots |

| April 30 | Toronto Maple Leafs | 1–2 | St. Louis Blues | St. Louis Arena | Recap |
| No scoring | | First period | 08:27 – pp – Eddy Beers (2) |
| Brad Smith (2) – 02:18 | | Second period | No scoring |
| No scoring | | Third period | 07:34 – Kevin LaVallee (2) |
| Ken Wregget 22 saves / 24 shots | | Goalie stats | Greg Millen 32 saves / 33 shots |

| St. Louis won series 4–3 |

==== (S1) Edmonton Oilers vs. (S2) Calgary Flames ====
This was the third playoff series meeting between these two teams. Edmonton won both previous meetings, including their most recent meeting in seven games in the 1984 Smythe Division Finals.

The deciding goal of game seven between the Oilers and Flames was scored five minutes into the third period when Edmonton's Steve Smith attempted a cross-ice pass from the side of his own net and the puck struck goaltender Grant Fuhr's leg and went into the Edmonton goal. Perry Berezan of the Flames was given credit for the goal as he was the last opposing player to touch the puck. This goal is significant because it eliminated the Oilers from the playoffs and prevented them from possibly winning a third straight Stanley Cup, as well as a record tying five straight Stanley Cups. To date this is the Flames' only playoff series victory over the Oilers.

| April 18 | Calgary Flames | 4–1 | Edmonton Oilers | Northlands Coliseum | Recap |
| Lanny McDonald (4) – 01:27; Gary Suter (1) – 07:38 | | First period | No scoring |
| No scoring | | Second period | 19:48 – pp – Glenn Anderson (3) |
| Joe Mullen (4) – 00:40; Hakan Loob (1) – 09:09 | | Third period | No scoring |
| Mike Vernon 30 saves / 31 shots | | Goalie stats | Grant Fuhr 29 saves / 33 shots |

| April 20 | Calgary Flames | 5–6 | OT | Edmonton Oilers | Northlands Coliseum | Recap |
| Hakan Loob (2) – sh – 11:23 | | First period | | 19:36 – Glenn Anderson (4) |
| Gary Suter (2) – 08:20; Dan Quinn (1) – pp – 11:10; Joe Mullen (5) – 15:40 | | Second period | | 08:51 – Randy Gregg (1) |
| Joe Mullen (6) – 18:40 | | Third period | | 00:44 – Craig MacTavish (1); 11:22 – Mark Napier (1); 16:46 – Dave Hunter (2) |
| No scoring | | First overtime period | | 01:04 – Glenn Anderson (5) |
| Rejean Lemelin 23 saves / 29 shots | | Goalie stats | | Grant Fuhr 26 saves / 31 shots |

| April 22 | Edmonton Oilers | 2–3 | Calgary Flames | Olympic Saddledome | Recap |
| Wayne Gretzky (4) – pp – 19:31 | | First period | 08:36 – pp – Paul Reinhart (3) |
| No scoring | | Second period | 09:59 – Colin Patterson (1) |
| Glenn Anderson (6) – 01:16 | | Third period | 07:32 – Joel Otto (1) |
| Grant Fuhr 35 saves / 38 shots | | Goalie stats | Mike Vernon 17 saves / 19 shots |

| April 24 | Edmonton Oilers | 7–4 | Calgary Flames | Olympic Saddledome | Recap |
| Craig MacTavish (2) – pp – 16:47; Wayne Gretzky (5) – pp – 17:07 | | First period | No scoring |
| Jari Kurri (2) – sh – 05:07; Craig MacTavish (3) – 08:31 | | Second period | 00:16 – Jim Peplinski (2); 07:21 – pp – Joel Otto (2); 18:35 – pp – Paul Reinhart (4) |
| Wayne Gretzky (6) – 01:51; Esa Tikkanen (2) – 07:09; Wayne Gretzky (7) – sh – 12:01 | | Third period | 11:17 – pp – Joel Otto (3) |
| Grant Fuhr 36 saves / 40 shots | | Goalie stats | Mike Vernon 14 saves / 21 shots Rejean Lemelin 6 saves / 6 shots |

| April 26 | Calgary Flames | 4–1 | Edmonton Oilers | Northlands Coliseum | Recap |
| Dan Quinn (2) – 19:29 | | First period | No scoring |
| Lanny McDonald (5) – 12:35; Joel Otto (4) – 14:59 | | Second period | 05:35 – Wayne Gretzky (8) |
| Jamie Macoun (1) – en – 19:44 | | Third period | No scoring |
| Mike Vernon 30 saves / 31 shots | | Goalie stats | Grant Fuhr 29 saves / 32 shots |

| April 28 | Edmonton Oilers | 5–2 | Calgary Flames | Olympic Saddledome | Recap |
| No scoring | | First period | No scoring |
| Esa Tikkanen (3) – 08:21; Mark Messier (3) – sh – 16:20 | | Second period | 04:42 – pp – Joe Mullen (7); 06:04 – John Tonelli (3) |
| Glenn Anderson (7) – 07:24; Mike Krushelnyski (4) – en – 19:38; Craig MacTavish (4) – 19:49 | | Third period | No scoring |
| Grant Fuhr 22 saves / 24 shots | | Goalie stats | Mike Vernon 34 saves / 38 shots |

| April 30 | Calgary Flames | 3–2 | Edmonton Oilers | Northlands Coliseum | Recap |
| Hakan Loob (3) – sh – 15:27 | | First period | No scoring |
| Jim Peplinski (3) – 02:08 | | Second period | 10:47 – Glenn Anderson (8); 19:09 – Mark Messier (4) |
| Perry Berezan (1) – 05:14 | | Third period | No scoring |
| Mike Vernon 22 saves / 24 shots | | Goalie stats | Grant Fuhr 18 saves / 21 shots |

| Calgary won series 4–3 |

== Conference finals ==
=== Prince of Wales Conference final ===
==== (A2) Montreal Canadiens vs. (P4) New York Rangers ====
This series is best remembered for the third game, in which the Rangers badly outshot the Habs, but were stymied by Patrick Roy. Another Montreal rookie, Claude Lemieux, scored in overtime—his second overtime goal of the playoffs.

| May 1 | New York Rangers | 1–2 | Montreal Canadiens | Montreal Forum | Recap |
| No scoring | | First period | No scoring |
| Willie Huber (3) – pp – 08:48 | | Second period | 03:08 – Mats Naslund (4); 13:02 – Bob Gainey (3) |
| No scoring | | Third period | No scoring |
| John Vanbiesbrouck 28 saves / 30 shots | | Goalie stats | Patrick Roy 26 saves / 27 shots |

| May 3 | New York Rangers | 2–6 | Montreal Canadiens | Montreal Forum | Recap |
| Wilf Paiement (4) – 03:15 | | First period | 09:25 – Bobby Smith (3) |
| No scoring | | Second period | 01:41 – Guy Carbonneau (6); 09:22 – Mike McPhee (3); 13:22 – Claude Lemieux (7); 19:43 – sh – Guy Carbonneau (7) |
| Wilf Paiement (5) – pp – 08:38 | | Third period | 13:24 – pp – Chris Chelios (1) |
| John Vanbiesbrouck 21 saves / 26 shots Glen Hanlon 5 saves / 6 shots | | Goalie stats | Patrick Roy 19 saves / 21 shots |

| May 5 | Montreal Canadiens | 4–3 | OT | New York Rangers | Madison Square Garden | Recap |
| Stephane Richer (4) – pp – 06:00 | | First period | | 03:15 – Kelly Miller (3) |
| No scoring | | Second period | | 14:57 – Mike Ridley (6) |
| Mats Naslund (5) – 05:06; Bobby Smith (4) – pp – 17:56 | | Third period | | 12:54 – Bob Brooke (5) |
| Claude Lemieux (8) – 09:41 | | First overtime period | | No scoring |
| Patrick Roy 44 saves / 47 shots | | Goalie stats | | John Vanbiesbrouck 25 saves / 29 shots |

| May 7 | Montreal Canadiens | 0–2 | New York Rangers | Madison Square Garden | Recap |
| No scoring | | First period | 16:56 – sh – Bob Brooke (6) |
| No scoring | | Second period | No scoring |
| No scoring | | Third period | 13:28 – Tomas Sandstrom (3) |
| Patrick Roy 27 saves / 29 shots | | Goalie stats | John Vanbiesbrouck 30 saves / 30 shots |

| May 9 | New York Rangers | 1–3 | Montreal Canadiens | Montreal Forum | Recap |
| Tomas Sandstrom (4) – 03:50 | | First period | 18:21 – pp – Claude Lemieux (9) |
| No scoring | | Second period | 04:41 – pp – Bobby Smith (5) |
| No scoring | | Third period | 09:51 – Bob Gainey (4) |
| John Vanbiesbrouck 26 saves / 29 shots | | Goalie stats | Patrick Roy 19 saves / 20 shots |

| Montreal won series 4–1 |

=== Clarence Campbell Conference final ===
==== (S2) Calgary Flames vs. (N3) St. Louis Blues ====
In Game 6, the Flames led 4–1 after two periods and 5–2 early in the third, but the Blues came back to tie it and then won on an overtime goal by Doug Wickenheiser. In Game 7, the Flames were up 2–0 before the Blues scored in the third to cut the lead in half. There would not be another comeback, though, as Mike Vernon and the Flames withstood a late assault to advance to their first Stanley Cup Final.

| May 2 | St. Louis Blues | 3–2 | Calgary Flames | Olympic Saddledome | Recap |
| Mark Reeds (3) – 09:57 | | First period | No scoring |
| No scoring | | Second period | 08:59 – Colin Patterson (2); 16:36 – pp – Hakan Loob (4) |
| Mark Reeds (4) – 14:42; Mark Hunter (5) – 15:48 | | Third period | No scoring |
| Rick Wamsley 33 saves / 35 shots | | Goalie stats | Mike Vernon 33 saves / 36 shots |

| May 4 | St. Louis Blues | 2–8 | Calgary Flames | Olympic Saddledome | Recap |
| No scoring | | First period | 08:51 – Doug Risebrough (3); 18:17 – Doug Risebrough (4); 19:57 – pp – Joe Mullen (8) |
| Rob Ramage (1) – 18:15 | | Second period | 01:25 – Lanny McDonald (6) |
| Doug Gilmour (8) – 05:38 | | Third period | 01:35 – Doug Risebrough (5); 04:25 – pp – Colin Patterson (3); 10:58 – pp – Dan Quinn (3); 18:15 – pp – Al MacInnis (3) |
| Greg Millen 13 saves / 17 shots Rick Wamsley 18 saves / 22 shots | | Goalie stats | Mike Vernon 20 saves / 22 shots |

| May 6 | Calgary Flames | 5–3 | St. Louis Blues | St. Louis Arena | Recap |
| Joe Mullen (9) – pp – 00:20; Lanny McDonald (7) – pp – 15:22 | | First period | 09:35 – pp – Bernie Federko (6) |
| John Tonelli (4) – 03:37; Doug Risebrough (6) – sh – 14:40 | | Second period | 12:14 – Gino Cavallini (3) |
| Colin Patterson (4) – en – 19:01 | | Third period | 12:29 – pp – Brian Benning (1) |
| Mike Vernon 23 saves / 26 shots | | Goalie stats | Greg Millen 30 saves / 34 shots |

| May 8 | Calgary Flames | 2–5 | St. Louis Blues | St. Louis Arena | Recap |
| No scoring | | First period | 07:33 – Mark Hunter (6); 11:37 – Rick Meagher (3) |
| Lanny McDonald (8) – pp – 19:06 | | Second period | 16:03 – Gino Cavallini (4) |
| Lanny McDonald (9) – pp – 00:50 | | Third period | 00:24 – sh – Rick Meagher (4); 19:54 – en – Bernie Federko (7) |
| Mike Vernon 29 saves / 33 shots | | Goalie stats | Rick Wamsley 30 saves / 32 shots |

| May 10 | St. Louis Blues | 2–4 | Calgary Flames | Olympic Saddledome | Recap |
| No scoring | | First period | 03:11 – sh – Colin Patterson (5) |
| Doug Gilmour (9) – 04:08 | | Second period | 09:28 – pp – Dan Quinn (4); 11:23 – Dan Quinn (5) |
| Mark Hunter (7) – 09:27 | | Third period | 13:19 – Mike Eaves (1) |
| Rick Wamsley 25 saves / 29 shots | | Goalie stats | Mike Vernon 19 saves / 21 shots |

| May 12 | Calgary Flames | 5–6 | OT | St. Louis Blues | St. Louis Arena | Recap |
| No scoring | | First period | | No scoring |
| Dan Quinn (6) – pp – 00:20; Dan Quinn (7) – pp – 01:57; Jim Peplinski (4) – 09:19; John Tonelli (5) – pp – 14:44 | | Second period | | 05:58 – pp – Cliff Ronning |
| Joe Mullen (10) – 07:04 | | Third period | | 06:00 – pp – Doug Wickenheiser (1); 08:08 – Brian Sutter (1); 15:49 – Greg Paslawski (9); 18:52 – Greg Paslawski (10) |
| No scoring | | First overtime period | | 07:30 – Doug Wickenheiser (2) |
| Mike Vernon 31 saves / 37 shots | | Goalie stats | | Rick Wamsley 37 saves / 42 shots |

| May 14 | St. Louis Blues | 1–2 | Calgary Flames | Olympic Saddledome | Recap |
| No scoring | | First period | 05:42 – Al MacInnis (4) |
| No scoring | | Second period | 01:42 – Colin Patterson (6) |
| Eddy Beers (3) – pp – 18:02 | | Third period | No scoring |
| Rick Wamsley 23 saves / 25 shots | | Goalie stats | Mike Vernon 17 saves / 18 shots |

| Calgary won series 4–3 |

== Stanley Cup Final ==
This was the first playoff series between these two teams. This was the Canadiens' 32nd appearance in the Finals, while the Flames were making their first appearance in the Finals. Montreal had most recently won the Stanley Cup in 1979. The Flames became the first team to represent Calgary in the Finals since the 1923–24 Calgary Tigers who were defeated by the same Montreal Canadiens.

In game two Montreal's Brian Skrudland set an NHL and Stanley Cup Final record for the quickest overtime goal in history, scoring just nine seconds into overtime to win the game for Montreal.

| May 16 | Montreal Canadiens | 2–5 | Calgary Flames | Olympic Saddledome | Recap |
| Mats Naslund (6) – pp – 06:04 | | First period | 12:08 – John Tonelli (6); 19:11 – Jim Peplinski (5) |
| No scoring | | Second period | No scoring |
| Chris Chelios (2) – 17:56 | | Third period | 02:14 – sh – Dan Quinn (8); 03:33 – Lanny McDonald (10); 19:35 – en – Doug Risebrough (7) |
| Patrick Roy 25 saves / 29 shots | | Goalie stats | Mike Vernon 22 saves / 24 shots |

| May 18 | Montreal Canadiens | 3–2 | OT | Calgary Flames | Olympic Saddledome | Recap |
| No scoring | | First period | | 09:06 – John Tonelli (7) |
| Gaston Gingras (1) – 03:45 | | Second period | | 00:15 – Paul Reinhart (5) – pp |
| David Maley (1) – 03:30 | | Third period | | No scoring |
| Brian Skrudland (1) – 00:09 | | First overtime period | | No scoring |
| Patrick Roy 20 saves / 22 shots | | Goalie stats | | Mike Vernon 32 saves / 35 shots |

| May 20 | Calgary Flames | 3–5 | Montreal Canadiens | Montreal Forum | Recap |
| Joe Mullen (11) – pp – 05:45; Joel Otto (5) – pp – 17:59 | | First period | 06:50 – Mats Naslund (7); 18:25 – Bobby Smith (6); 19:17 – pp – Mats Naslund (8); 19:33 – Bob Gainey (5) |
| Lanny McDonald (11) – pp – 07:13 | | Second period | 19:22 – Kjell Dahlin (2) |
| No scoring | | Third period | No scoring |
| Mike Vernon 12 saves / 16 shots Rejean Lemelin 12 saves / 13 shots | | Goalie stats | Patrick Roy 23 saves / 26 shots |

| May 22 | Calgary Flames | 0–1 | Montreal Canadiens | Montreal Forum | Recap |
| No scoring | | First period | No scoring |
| No scoring | | Second period | No scoring |
| No scoring | | Third period | 11:10 – Claude Lemieux (10) |
| Mike Vernon 23 saves / 24 shots | | Goalie stats | Patrick Roy 15 saves / 15 shots |

| May 24 | Montreal Canadiens | 4–3 | Calgary Flames | Olympic Saddledome | Recap |
| Gaston Gingras (2) – pp – 06:53 | | First period | No scoring |
| Brian Skrudland (2) – 10:49 | | Second period | 07:17 – Steve Bozek (1) |
| Rick Green (1) – 10:11; Bobby Smith (7) – 10:30 | | Third period | 16:46 – Steve Bozek (2); 19:14 – Joe Mullen (12) |
| Patrick Roy 30 saves / 33 shots | | Goalie stats | Mike Vernon 29 saves / 33 shots |

| Montreal won series 4–1 |

== Player statistics ==
=== Skaters ===
These are the top ten skaters based on points.

| Player | Team | GP | G | A | Pts | +/– | PIM |
|---|---|---|---|---|---|---|---|
| Doug Gilmour | St. Louis Blues | 19 | 9 | 12 | 21 | +3 | 25 |
| Bernie Federko | St. Louis Blues | 19 | 7 | 14 | 21 | +2 | 17 |
| Joe Mullen | Calgary Flames | 21 | 12 | 7 | 19 | -3 | 4 |
| Wayne Gretzky | Edmonton Oilers | 10 | 8 | 11 | 19 | -1 | 2 |
| Mats Naslund | Montreal Canadiens | 20 | 8 | 11 | 19 | -1 | 4 |
| Al MacInnis | Calgary Flames | 21 | 4 | 15 | 19 | +10 | 30 |
| Lanny McDonald | Calgary Flames | 22 | 11 | 7 | 18 | +5 | 30 |
| Paul Reinhart | Calgary Flames | 21 | 5 | 13 | 18 | -2 | 4 |
| Greg Paslawski | St. Louis Blues | 17 | 10 | 7 | 17 | +4 | 13 |
| Pierre Larouche | New York Rangers | 16 | 8 | 9 | 17 | -5 | 0 |

=== Goaltenders ===
This is a combined table of the top five goaltenders based on goals against average and the top five goaltenders based on save percentage, with at least 420 minutes played. The table is sorted by GAA, and the criteria for inclusion are bolded.

| Player | Team | GP | W | L | SA | GA | GAA | SV% | SO | TOI |
|---|---|---|---|---|---|---|---|---|---|---|
| Mike Liut | Hartford Whalers | 8 | 5 | 2 | 226 | 14 | **1.91** | **.938** | 1 | 439:29 |
| Patrick Roy | Montreal Canadiens | 20 | 15 | 5 | 504 | 39 | **1.93** | **.923** | 1 | 1214:56 |
| Pete Peeters | Washington Capitals | 9 | 5 | 4 | 253 | 24 | **2.66** | **.905** | 0 | 541:15 |
| Mike Vernon | Calgary Flames | 21 | 12 | 9 | 581 | 60 | **2.94** | .897 | 0 | 1226:02 |
| Greg Millen | St. Louis Blues | 10 | 6 | 3 | 327 | 29 | **2.98** | **.911** | 0 | 583:11 |

== See also ==
- List of Stanley Cup champions

| Preceded by 1985 Stanley Cup playoffs | Stanley Cup playoffs | Succeeded by 1987 Stanley Cup playoffs |
