= Brownschidle =

Brownschidle is a surname. Notable people with the surname include:

- Jack Brownschidle (born 1955), American ice hockey player, brother of Jeff
- Jeff Brownschidle (1959–1996), American ice hockey player
