= List of most watched Canadian television broadcasts of 1986 =

The following is a list of most watched Canadian television broadcasts of 1986 (single-network only) according to Nielsen.

== Most watched by week ==
Week of	Program	Network	Viewers (million)	Ref.
January 6	The Cosby Show	CTV	6.29	
January 13	The Cosby Show	CTV	5.68	
January 20	The Cosby Show	CTV	5.05	
January 27	The Cosby Show	CTV	6.23	
February 3	The Cosby Show	CTV	5.18	
February 10	The Cosby Show	CTV	5.55	
February 17	The Cosby Show	CTV	6.02	
February 24	The Cosby Show	CTV	5.35	
March 3	The Cosby Show	CTV	5.60	
March 10	Unknown			
March 17	58th Academy Awards	CTV	4.92	
March 24	Unknown			
March 31	Unknown			
April 7	The Cosby Show	CTV	5.31	
April 14	The Cosby Show	CTV	4.59	
April 21	1986 Stanley Cup playoffs	CBC	3.79	
April 28	Unknown			
May 5	The Cosby Show	CTV	3.64	
May 12	The Cosby Show	CTV	4.52	
