= Brad Smith (ice hockey) =

- Born: April 13, 1958 (age 68) Windsor, Ontario, Canada
- Height: 6 ft 1 in (185 cm)
- Weight: 195 lb (88 kg; 13 st 13 lb)
- Position: Right wing
- Shot: Right
- Played for: Vancouver Canucks; Atlanta Flames; Calgary Flames; Detroit Red Wings; Toronto Maple Leafs
- NHL draft: 57th overall, 1978; Vancouver Canucks
- Playing career: 1978–1987

Bradley Allan Smith (born April 13, 1958) is a Canadian former professional ice hockey player who played 222 games over nine National Hockey League (NHL) seasons with the Vancouver Canucks, Atlanta Flames, Calgary Flames, Detroit Red Wings, and Toronto Maple Leafs. He was also a member of the Central Hockey League's Adams Cup winning Dallas Blackhawks, 1978–79. After retiring Smith became a scout, and since 2016 has been the Director of Scouting for the Colorado Avalanche. Smith's nephew, Hunter, was drafted by the Calgary Flames in the 2014 NHL entry draft.

== Early career ==
Described as a heady, defensive forward known for his physical play in William Houston's book, The Rise and Fall of the Toronto Maple Leafs, Smith led his hometown Windsor Spitfires in scoring with 37 goals and 90 points during his rookie OHA season, 1976–77. The following year, he was traded to the Sudbury Wolves for Wes Jarvis. Registering 80 goals and 172 points in 136 OHA games, Smith was selected by Vancouver 57th overall in the 1978 NHL entry draft. During his first intrasquad game, he scored twice and got into a fight with Dennis Kearns. Sent to the CHL's Dallas Blackhawks where he scored 17 times in 60 games in 1978–79, Smith earned a two-game call-up to the parent club.

== NHL career ==
The following year, 1979–80, Smith spent 19 games with Vancouver, scoring his first NHL goal against the Colorado Rockies on December 14, 1979, tying the game at 3-3 (as noted in a Vancouver Sun report by Arv Olson the following day). Minutes later, Smith set up the game-winning goal.

Smith also played for Vancouver in the 1979-80 Super Series, in which nine NHL teams played a series of games against the top two Soviet clubs. In the opening game of the international series on December 26, 1979, Smith led the Canucks to a 6–2 victory, scoring twice within 17 seconds (both slapshots) against HC Moscow Dynamo goaltender, Vladimir Myshkin (who shut out the NHL All-Stars the previous year to win the 1979 Challenge Cup for the Soviet national team before winning Olympic Gold in 1984). It was the only game the Dynamo lost against the four NHL teams faced. As reported by Canadian Press the following day and published in The Leader Post, Smith's outburst is thus described:

"Smith scored his first goal...when he was allowed to skate in from the corner and blast a rising 30-footer over Myshkin's shoulder," CP reported. "Just 17 seconds later, Smith broke in on a two-on-one with Gary Lupul and blistered a 35-footer into the far corner."

On February 8, 1980, Smith and Don Lever were traded to Atlanta for Darcy Rota and Ivan Boldirev, as reported in The Montreal Gazette the following day. Smith played four games for Atlanta before the team relocated for the 1980–81 season, where he became an original member of the Calgary Flames. On December 27, 1980, Smith scored the game-winning goal on a two-on-nothing, give-and-go breakaway with fellow journeyman Alex McKendry to beat Philadelphia 2–1, as the Associated Press noted in reports published the following day. In all, Smith scored seven goals over 45 games with Calgary before he was sent down to the Birmingham Bulls of the CHL. There, he registered 11 points in 10 games before the Bulls folded abruptly on February 20, 1981. Eight days later, Smith was on the move again, this time to Detroit, where he was traded for Rick Vasko, scoring 5 goals in 20 games for his highest NHL season total of 12.

Splitting the next four years between Detroit and its farm team, Smith was named an American Hockey League All-Star after registering 72 points with the Adirondack Red Wings in 1984–85. Playing the final game of the season with Detroit, Smith scored, then suited up for the playoffs, setting up a goal by John Ogrodnick and fighting Al Secord.

"Though he spent much of last season in the minors," wrote The Toronto Star's Wayne Parish on Nov 6, 1985, "he was magnificent in playing every single Red Wing playoff game."

After five years in the Detroit organization, The Windsor Star's Jim McKay reported on July 6, 1985, that Smith had turned down a one-year contract offer to test the free-agent market. Signed instead by Toronto for two years, "Motor City Smitty", as he was nicknamed by then Leafs' radio man Bill Waters, enjoyed his most productive years on hockey's biggest stage, Maple Leaf Gardens. During the 1985–86 season, Smith registered a career NHL high 17 assists to go along with his five goals over 42 games. As reported by Rick Fraser of The Toronto Star on March 19, 1986, Smith was nominated for the Bill Masterton Memorial Trophy, awarded annually to the NHL player best exemplifying perseverance, sportsmanship, and dedication to the game. He also had an excellent playoff showing, scoring twice (one of which involved a lesson in geometry as he shot from the corner, banking the puck off St. Louis Blues goaltender Greg Millen's pads and into the net for Toronto's only goal in the game seven Norris Final 2–1 loss) and adding an assist in six post-season games.

In game two of that second-round series, Smith chased an errant puck and Blues' defenceman Lee Norwood into the corner, taking Norwood hard into the boards. Norwood responded by sucker punching Smith from behind, and essentially poking Smith in the eye with the thumb of his glove. As Smith felt for blood, looking at his hand, Norwood punched Smith from behind again. The gratuitous clip made Late Night with David Letterman and today remains something of a cult classic on YouTube. More importantly, Toronto scored the tying goal on the ensuing power play, then the winner, and got back into the series. Smith's shiner, meanwhile, became the local rallying point on the front page of The Toronto Sun, while Hockey Night in Canada began coverage of game three with a live close-up of Smith's eye under the harsh studio lights. Historically, the incident is seen as a key momentum shift in what would now turn into a seven-game series.

Coached in Toronto by Dan Maloney and John Brophy respectively, Smith's skills were best utilized with the Maple Leafs, where his key role was to "change the pace of the game". The Toronto Star's Frank Orr deemed Smith "an adrenalin player" while Brophy saw Smith as "a whirling dervish" who could stray from a disciplined checking role at the flip of a switch, leaving his wing, generally skating all over the ice, and playing what Brophy termed a "helter-skelter" style designed to throw the opposition's systems into chaos—an infuriating trait that would eventually get Smith's name on the Stanley Cup.

In a Toronto Star article dated, January 27, 1986, Don Cherry described Smith as "one of the best cornermen in the league". Cherry also liked the fact that fights were a big part of Smith's game. And while one of hockey's last 11 helmetless warriors seldom won, he seldom lost, holding his own against the likes of Clark Gillies, Stan Jonathan, "Mad Dog" Bob Kelly, Joey Kocur, Lindy Ruff, and Glen Cochrane. As a Maple Leaf, Smith faced his former team, the Red Wings, on November 15, 1986, in Toronto, fighting Gerard Gallant on the opening face-off, then going on to drop the gloves three more times that game. So distracted were the Wings by their former teammate that Toronto was up 6–0 by the time Smith was ejected and served with 57 minutes, etching his name in Maple Leaf records as the most penalized Leaf in a single game. It was also Toronto's most penalized game in franchise history, as noted in team records. Smith was again a stalwart playoff performer in 1986–87, scoring a game-winning breakaway goal to clinch Toronto's 1987 opening-round series win over the St. Louis Blues on April 16 of that year. At that point, the Leafs had not won a best-of-seven playoff series since 1978, and they would not win another playoff series period until 1993, making Smith's goal, arguably, the most important over a span of 15 years in Toronto Maple Leafs history. More recently, the goal is celebrated in the Hockey Night in Canada DVD box set, Ten Great Leafs and Their Most Memorable Games.

While in Toronto, Smith also set up goals for Wendel Clark to both tie and surpass the Leafs' rookie goal-scoring mark on March 3, 1986, against the Winnipeg Jets, a game in which Smith deployed a remarkable behind-the-back pass to set up Clark's second goal of the game, an open-netter to break the record. The following day, Toronto Star columnist Wayne Parrish thus described the play: "Smith's behind-the-back pass to set up Clark's second goal was vintage Gretzky." Earlier, Smith picked an errant pass out of the air with his stick (which Parrish deemed "a pretty piece of work") to set up the drive in which Clark tied the rookie mark.

== Post-playing career ==
Smith's playing career ended in the fall of 1987 following a hit by Clark during an intrasquad training camp game. Having just signed a three-year contract, Smith eventually retired as a result of the back injury, running a charter-fishing business before returning home to Windsor in 1989 to coach the Spitfires for 2 1/2 years. After returning the Spitfires to respectability, Smith joined the Edmonton Oilers' scouting staff in 1991, serving under Glen Sather.

At the start of the 1995–96 season, Smith became a scout for the Colorado Avalanche. There, he enjoyed perhaps his finest moment, deconstructing Scotty Bowman's left-wing lock during the 1996 playoffs and neutralizing it as Colorado beat the favoured Red Wings and went on to win the Stanley Cup. "Smith noticed the Red Wings' left wingers, who stayed back to help the defense, were small," The Sporting News reported, "so the Avalanche made sure to softly dump the puck into the right corner, where the Avs' forwards pounced. This wore down Detroit's left wingers." Colorado won the series, and by the time the Avalanche swept the Florida Panthers in the finals, Detroit general manager Ken Holland was publicly crediting Smith with that key assist in Colorado's successful run. The Avalanche won another Cup in 2001, and Smith's name is now engraved on the Stanley Cup. He currently serves as the Avalanche's director of player personnel.

In October, 2009, Smith was inducted into the Windsor-Essex County Sports Hall of Fame.

== Career statistics ==
=== Regular season and playoffs ===
			Regular season					Playoffs
Season	Team	League	GP	G	A	Pts	PIM	GP	G	A	Pts	PIM
1974–75	Belle River Canadiens	GLJCHL	66	37	53	90	165	—	—	—	—	—
1975–76	Windsor Spitfires	OMJHL	4	4	2	6	4	—	—	—	—	—
1976–77	Windsor Spitfires	OMJHL	66	37	53	90	154	—	—	—	—	—
1977–78	Windsor Spitfires	OMJHL	20	18	16	34	39	9	4	10	14	30
1977–78	Sudbury Wolves	OMJHL	46	21	21	42	183	—	—	—	—	—
1977–78	Kalamazoo Wings	IHL	—	—	—	—	—	3	0	1	1	15
1978–79	Vancouver Canucks	NHL	2	0	0	0	2	—	—	—	—	—
1978–79	Dallas Black Hawks	CHL	60	17	18	35	143	9	1	3	4	22
1979–80	Vancouver Canucks	NHL	19	1	3	4	50	—	—	—	—	—
1979–80	Dallas Black Hawks	CHL	51	26	16	42	138	—	—	—	—	—
1979–80	Atlanta Flames	NHL	4	0	0	0	4	—	—	—	—	—
1980–81	Calgary Flames	NHL	45	7	4	11	65	—	—	—	—	—
1980–81	Birmingham Bulls	CHL	10	5	6	11	13	—	—	—	—	—
1980–81	Detroit Red Wings	NHL	20	5	2	7	93	—	—	—	—	—
1981–82	Detroit Red Wings	NHL	33	2	0	2	80	—	—	—	—	—
1981–82	Adirondack Red Wings	AHL	34	10	5	15	126	5	0	0	0	8
1982–83	Detroit Red Wings	NHL	1	0	0	0	0	—	—	—	—	—
1982–83	Adirondack Red Wings	AHL	74	20	30	50	132	6	1	1	2	10
1983–84	Detroit Red Wings	NHL	8	2	1	3	36	—	—	—	—	—
1983–84	Adirondack Red Wings	AHL	46	15	29	44	128	7	1	1	2	26
1984–85	Detroit Red Wings	NHL	1	1	0	1	5	3	0	1	1	5
1984–85	Adirondack Red Wings	AHL	75	33	39	72	89	—	—	—	—	—
1985–86	Toronto Maple Leafs	NHL	42	5	17	22	84	6	2	1	3	20
1985–86	St. Catharines Saints	AHL	31	13	29	42	79	—	—	—	—	—
1986–87	Toronto Maple Leafs	NHL	47	5	7	12	172	11	1	1	2	24
AHL totals			260	91	132	223	554	18	2	2	4	44
NHL totals			222	28	34	62	591	20	3	3	6	49
