= Tom Fergus =

American ice hockey player (born 1962)

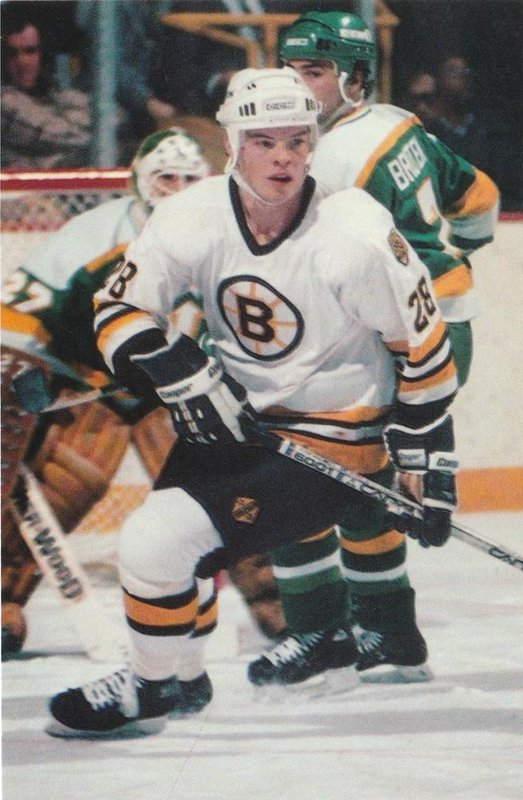
- Fergus in 1984 for Boston Bruins in action versus Minnesota North Stars
- Born: June 16, 1962 (age 63) Chicago, Illinois, U.S.
- Height: 6 ft 3 in (191 cm)
- Weight: 200 lb (91 kg; 14 st 4 lb)
- Position: Center
- Shot: Left
- Played for: Boston Bruins; Toronto Maple Leafs; Vancouver Canucks; EV Zug
- National team: United States
- NHL draft: 60th overall, 1980; Boston Bruins
- Playing career: 1981–1995

Thomas Joseph Fergus (born June 16, 1962) is an American former professional ice hockey center who played 726 regular season games in the National Hockey League for 12 seasons between 1981 and 1993.

== Playing career ==
Tom Fergus grew up in Montreal, Quebec. As a youth, he played in the 1974 and 1975 Quebec International Pee-Wee Hockey Tournaments with a minor ice hockey team from Pointe-Claire. He later played junior ice hockey for the Peterborough Petes, and was selected 60th overall in the 1980 NHL entry draft. He only scored 14 points in his draft year, but found his stride the year following, improving to 43 goals and 88 points.

In 1981–82, Fergus surprisingly made a strong Boston team at the age of just 19, and turned in a fine rookie season with 15 goals and 39 points in 61 games. He quickly evolved into a solid, productive second-line center behind top-line pivot Barry Pederson, and his production jumped to 28 goals and 63 points in 1982–83.

During the 1984 Stanley Cup playoffs, Fergus scored the only two Boston goals in their surprising loss to the Montreal Canadiens in the Adams division semifinal, a best-of-five series that Montreal won in three straight games.

With Pederson injured for much of the 1984–85 campaign, Fergus spent most of the season on Boston's top line, and set career highs with 30 goals and 73 points. He also made his international debut with the United States national team in the 1985 Ice Hockey World Championship tournament in Prague after the Bruins were knocked out in the first round of the Stanley Cup playoffs. However, with Pederson's return the following year along with Ken Linseman Boston was left with three scoring-line centers, and Fergus was dealt to the Toronto Maple Leafs for Bill Derlago.

Fergus immediately became Toronto's top center and set a new career high with 31 goals in 1985–86, as well as matching his career high of 73 points. However, his 1986–87 season was ruined by a viral infection which caused him to miss significant action, although he still produced well when healthy with 49 points in 57 games. He returned to form in 1988–89, registering a career high 45 assists and 67 points, although he drew criticism for his defensive play and his league-worst -38 rating.

Midway through the 1989–90 season, Fergus suffered a serious groin injury which caused him to miss two months of action. Although he returned for the playoffs, the injury lingered and forced him to have surgery early in the 1990–91 campaign. He missed almost the entire season, recording 9 points in just 14 games.

After a poor start to the 1991–92 season, Fergus was placed on waivers and claimed by the Vancouver Canucks. His scoring touch returned with Vancouver, as he scored 14 goals and 34 points in just 44 games, including a number of clutch goals down the stretch. He added 5 goals and 8 points in 13 playoff games. However, he was used as a utility player in a more limited role the following year, and registered 14 points in 36 games.

After being released by Vancouver, Fergus signed in Switzerland with EV Zug and spent two seasons there before retiring in 1995. He finished his career with 235 goals and 346 assists for 581 points in 726 NHL games, along with 499 penalty minutes.

== Post career ==
Fergus now resides in Oakville, Ontario where he is active in the Toronto Maple Leaf alumni association and owns a promotional clothing company, Blue Leaf Limited.

== Career statistics ==
=== Regular season and playoffs ===
			Regular season					Playoffs
Season	Team	League	GP	G	A	Pts	PIM	GP	G	A	Pts	PIM
1979–80	Peterborough Petes	OMJHL	63	8	6	14	14	14	1	5	6	6
1979–80	Peterborough Petes	MC	—	—	—	—	—	5	1	0	1	4
1980–81	Peterborough Petes	OHL	63	43	45	88	33	5	1	4	5	2
1981–82	Boston Bruins	NHL	61	15	24	39	12	6	3	0	3	0
1982–83	Boston Bruins	NHL	80	28	35	63	39	15	2	2	4	15
1983–84	Boston Bruins	NHL	69	25	36	61	12	3	2	0	2	9
1984–85	Boston Bruins	NHL	79	30	43	73	75	5	0	0	0	4
1985–86	Toronto Maple Leafs	NHL	78	31	42	73	64	10	5	7	12	6
1986–87	Newmarket Saints	AHL	1	0	1	1	0	—	—	—	—	—
1986–87	Toronto Maple Leafs	NHL	57	21	28	49	57	2	0	1	1	2
1987–88	Toronto Maple Leafs	NHL	63	19	31	50	81	6	2	3	5	2
1988–89	Toronto Maple Leafs	NHL	80	22	45	67	48	—	—	—	—	—
1989–90	Toronto Maple Leafs	NHL	54	19	26	45	62	5	2	1	3	4
1990–91	Toronto Maple Leafs	NHL	14	5	4	9	8	—	—	—	—	—
1991–92	Vancouver Canucks	NHL	44	14	20	34	17	15	5	3	8	6
1992–93	Vancouver Canucks	NHL	36	5	9	14	20	—	—	—	—	—
1993–94	EV Zug	NDA	32	21	29	50	104	9	4	5	9	24
1994–95	EV Zug	NDA	22	12	12	24	56	12	3	10	13	16
NHL totals			726	235	346	581	499	65	21	17	38	48

=== International ===
Year	Team	Event	GP	G	A	Pts	PIM
1985	United States	WC	8	4	2	6	14
