= Stewart Gavin =

Canadian ice hockey player

- Born: March 15, 1960 (age 66) Ottawa, Ontario, Canada
- Height: 6 ft 0 in (183 cm)
- Weight: 180 lb (82 kg; 12 st 12 lb)
- Position: Right wing
- Shot: Left
- Played for: Toronto Maple Leafs; Hartford Whalers; Minnesota North Stars
- NHL draft: 74th overall, 1980; Toronto Maple Leafs
- Playing career: 1980–1995

Robert Stewart Gavin (born March 15, 1960) is a Canadian former professional ice hockey left winger who played in the NHL between 1980 and 1993.

Gavin was selected 74th overall by the Toronto Maple Leafs in the 1980 NHL entry draft. Gavin played 768 career NHL games, scoring 130 goals and 156 assists for 286 points. His best season was in 1985–86 when he scored 26 goals and 55 points with the Hartford Whalers. A knee injury forced Gavin into early retirement in 1993, though he did stage a one season comeback in the IHL in 1994. After retiring, Gavin entered business, and in 2003 founded his own firm, known as the Gavin Management Group.

== Playing career ==
Gavin played minor hockey in the OHA, mostly with the Toronto Marlboros, save for one game during the 1976–77 season, which was spent with the Ottawa 67's, who won the league championship that year (though Gavin did not play the minimum games required to be considered part of the championship team). A 57 point campaign in his final season of OHA action caught the eyes of scouts from the Toronto Maple Leafs, and the team drafted Gavin in the fourth round, 74th overall during the 1980 NHL draft.

Gavin made the NHL the year following his draft, but after 14 games was sent down to the Maple Leafs' minor league AHL affiliate, the New Brunswick Hawks to refine his play. Beginning next season, Gavin played in more and more games for Toronto, and by 1983, he had become the team's designated checker and solidified a role on the penalty kill. Despite improved play from Gavin, the Maple Leafs struggled during his tenure, and in 1984–85 finished last in the entire league. Seeking to improve the team's defensive core after the last-place finish, Gavin was traded to the Hartford Whalers for defenceman Chris Kotsopoulos on October 7, 1985. His first season in Hartford was his best professional season statistically, as he scored 55 points playing in 76 contests. Gavin would spend a total of three seasons with the Whalers before being claimed by the Minnesota North Stars in the 1988 NHL Waiver Draft. Gavin continued his role as a defensive forward with the North Stars, and helped the team reach the Stanley Cup Final in 1991. However, he injured his knee in 1993, and on the recommendation of his doctors, retired as a player.

Upon retirement, Gavin took a position as a scout. However, his knee was responding to treatment better than he expected, and Gavin came out of retirement prior to the 1994–95 season to stage a comeback with the Toronto Maple Leafs. However, he never played above the minor-league IHL, and upon completion of his lone season in the IHL, Gavin retired for a second time.

== Post hockey career ==
During his 15-year professional hockey career, Gavin recognized the need for a program that would ensure that an athlete’s business affairs were organized and that their interests were protected. Therefore, after his retirement from hockey, Gavin sought to develop this program. After gaining experience at a Bay Street firm, completing numerous industry-related courses and achieving the Certified Financial Planner designation, Gavin founded the Gavin Management Group in 2003. With over 18 years of practice in financial management, insurance and tax planning, Gavin's roster of clients include professional athletes and leaders in the corporate community. Gavin has also served as the president of the Toronto Maple Leafs Alumni Association, and remains on their board of directors, where the association’s efforts have raised more than $4,000,000 for various charitable and gift giving endeavours. Gavin continues to be active on the ice, playing with the alumni at charity events throughout the season; and, is also a member of the Masonic Lodge. In his leisure time, Gavin enjoys his private pilot licence, golf and relaxing on his farm in the Ottawa Valley with his family.

== Personal life ==
Gavin has two children, Taylor (b. November 24, 1993) and Max (b. 1989), both mothered by ex-wife, Phyllis Ellis (former Olympic field hockey player and current television actor and producer).

== Career statistics ==
			Regular season					Playoffs
Season	Team	League	GP	G	A	Pts	PIM	GP	G	A	Pts	PIM
1976–77	Nepean Raiders	CJHL	49	28	22	50	38	—	—	—	—	—
1976–77	Ottawa 67's	OMJHL	1	0	0	0	0	12	1	0	1	0
1977–78	Toronto Marlboros	OMJHL	67	16	24	40	19	5	0	5	5	17
1978–79	Toronto Marlboros	OMJHL	61	24	25	49	67	3	1	0	1	0
1979–80	Toronto Marlboros	OMJHL	66	27	30	57	52	4	1	1	2	2
1980–81	New Brunswick Hawks	AHL	46	7	12	19	42	13	1	0	1	2
1980–81	Toronto Maple Leafs	NHL	14	1	2	3	13	—	—	—	—	—
1981–82	Toronto Maple Leafs	NHL	38	5	6	11	29	—	—	—	—	—
1982–83	St. Catharines Saints	AHL	6	2	4	6	17	—	—	—	—	—
1982–83	Toronto Maple Leafs	NHL	63	6	5	11	44	4	0	0	0	0
1983–84	Toronto Maple Leafs	NHL	80	10	22	32	90	—	—	—	—	—
1984–85	Toronto Maple Leafs	NHL	73	12	13	25	38	—	—	—	—	—
1985–86	Hartford Whalers	NHL	76	26	29	55	51	10	4	1	5	13
1986–87	Hartford Whalers	NHL	79	20	21	41	28	6	2	4	6	10
1987–88	Hartford Whalers	NHL	56	11	10	21	59	6	2	2	4	4
1988–89	Minnesota North Stars	NHL	73	8	18	26	34	5	3	1	4	10
1989–90	Minnesota North Stars	NHL	80	12	13	25	76	7	0	2	2	12
1990–91	Minnesota North Stars	NHL	38	4	4	8	36	21	3	10	13	20
1991–92	Minnesota North Stars	NHL	35	5	4	9	27	7	0	0	0	6
1992–93	Minnesota North Stars	NHL	63	10	8	18	59	—	—	—	—	—
1994–95	Kansas City Blades	IHL	18	2	2	4	32	—	—	—	—	—
1994–95	Minnesota Moose	IHL	22	4	7	11	21	—	—	—	—	—
NHL totals			768	130	155	285	584	66	14	20	34	75
