= Jeff Brownschidle =

American ice hockey player (1959–1996)

- Born: March 1, 1959 Buffalo, New York, U.S.
- Died: December 13, 1996 (aged 37) Buffalo, New York, U.S.
- Height: 6 ft 2 in (188 cm)
- Weight: 201 lb (91 kg; 14 st 5 lb)
- Position: Defense
- Shot: Right
- Played for: Hartford Whalers
- National team: United States
- NHL draft: Undrafted
- Playing career: 1981–1984

Jeffrey Paul Brownschidle (March 1, 1959 – December 13, 1996) was an American ice hockey defenseman who played three games in the NHL for the Hartford Whalers during the 1981-82 NHL season and another four games in the 1982-83 NHL season. He also played in the American Hockey League for the Binghamton Whalers and the Central Hockey League for the Binghamton Whalers. His brother Jack Brownschidle also played in the NHL, played 494 games for the St. Louis Blues and the Hartford Whalers.

He was killed in a car accident on December 13, 1996, aged 37.

== Career statistics ==
=== Regular season and playoffs ===
			Regular season					Playoffs
Season	Team	League	GP	G	A	Pts	PIM	GP	G	A	Pts	PIM
1975–76	Amherst Knights	NYJHL	31	27	30	57	—	—	—	—	—	—
1976–77	Amherst Knights	NYJHL	34	31	29	60	—	—	—	—	—	—
1977–78	University of Notre Dame	WCHA	35	6	10	16	30	—	—	—	—	—
1978–79	University of Notre Dame	WCHA	36	6	17	23	42	—	—	—	—	—
1979–80	University of Notre Dame	WCHA	39	14	37	51	50	—	—	—	—	—
1980–81	University of Notre Dame	WCHA	36	4	28	32	56	—	—	—	—	—
1981–82	Hartford Whalers	NHL	3	0	1	1	2	—	—	—	—	—
1981–82	Binghamton Whalers	AHL	52	4	23	27	24	15	2	4	6	6
1982–83	Hartford Whalers	NHL	4	0	0	0	0	—	—	—	—	—
1982–83	Binghamton Whalers	AHL	64	9	18	27	52	5	0	1	1	23
1983–84	Binghamton Whalers	AHL	29	2	7	9	50	—	—	—	—	—
1983–84	Salt Lake Golden Eagles	CHL	11	1	7	8	12	—	—	—	—	—
AHL totals			145	15	48	63	126	20	2	5	7	29
NHL totals			7	0	1	1	2	—	—	—	—	—

=== International ===
Year	Team	Event	GP	G	A	Pts	PIM
1977	United States	WJC	7	1	0	1	0
1979	United States	WJC	5	1	2	3	2
Junior totals			12	2	2	4	2
