= Jack Brownschidle =

American ice hockey player (born 1955)

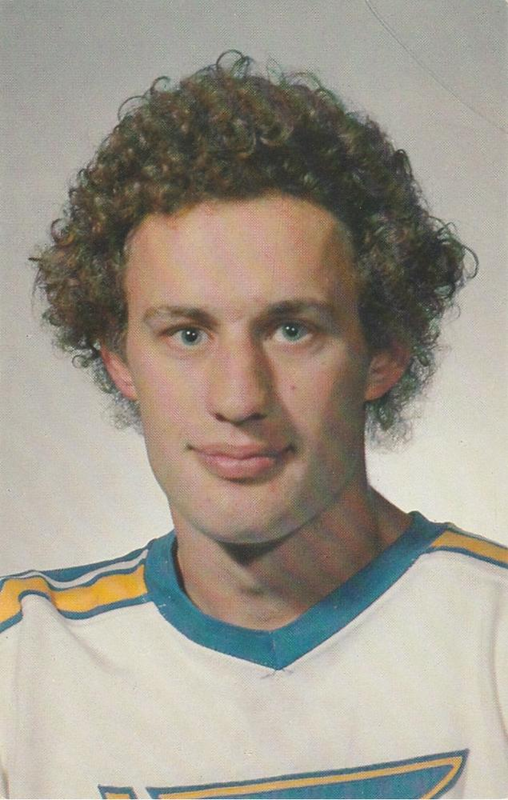
- Born: October 2, 1955 (age 70) Buffalo, New York, U.S.
- Height: 6 ft 2 in (188 cm)
- Weight: 194 lb (88 kg; 13 st 12 lb)
- Position: Defense
- Shot: Left
- Played for: St. Louis Blues; Hartford Whalers
- National team: United States
- NHL draft: 99th overall, 1975; St. Louis Blues
- WHA draft: 130th overall, 1974; Cleveland Crusaders
- Playing career: 1977–1987

John Joseph Brownschidle Jr. (born October 2, 1955) is an American former professional ice hockey player who played 494 NHL games with the St. Louis Blues and Hartford Whalers between 1977 and 1985. He was born in Buffalo, New York. Brownschidle was also a member of the University of Notre Dame hockey team before turning professional. His brother Jeff Brownschidle was also a former National Hockey League player who played three games for the Hartford Whalers. Internationally Brownschidle played for the American national team at the 1975 and 1979 World Championships.

== Career statistics ==
=== Regular season and playoffs ===
			Regular season					Playoffs
Season	Team	League	GP	G	A	Pts	PIM	GP	G	A	Pts	PIM
1972–73	Niagara Falls Flyers	SOJHL	32	9	19	28	20	—	—	—	—	—
1973–74	University of Notre Dame	WCHA	36	2	7	9	24	—	—	—	—	—
1973–74	United States National Team	Intl	18	2	3	5	—	—	—	—	—	—
1974–75	University of Notre Dame	WCHA	38	4	12	16	24	—	—	—	—	—
1975–76	University of Notre Dame	WCHA	38	12	24	36	24	—	—	—	—	—
1976–77	University of Notre Dame	WCHA	38	13	35	48	30	—	—	—	—	—
1977–78	St. Louis Blues	NHL	30	2	15	17	23	—	—	—	—	—
1977–78	Salt Lake Golden Eagles	CHL	25	4	12	16	0	—	—	—	—	—
1978–79	St. Louis Blues	NHL	64	10	24	34	14	—	—	—	—	—
1978–79	Salt Lake Golden Eagles	CHL	11	0	10	10	0	—	—	—	—	—
1979–80	St. Louis Blues	NHL	77	12	32	44	8	3	0	0	0	0
1980–81	St. Louis Blues	NHL	71	5	23	28	12	11	0	3	3	2
1981–82	St. Louis Blues	NHL	80	5	33	38	26	8	0	2	2	14
1982–83	St. Louis Blues	NHL	72	1	22	23	30	4	0	0	0	2
1983–84	St. Louis Blues	NHL	51	1	7	8	19	—	—	—	—	—
1983–84	Hartford Whalers	NHL	13	2	2	4	10	—	—	—	—	—
1984–85	Hartford Whalers	NHL	17	1	4	5	5	—	—	—	—	—
1984–85	Binghamton Whalers	AHL	56	4	17	21	8	—	—	—	—	—
1985–86	Hartford Whalers	NHL	9	0	0	0	4	—	—	—	—	—
1985–86	Binghamton Whalers	AHL	58	5	26	31	18	6	0	3	3	0
1986–87	Rochester Americans	AHL	74	8	22	30	13	12	1	3	4	0
NHL totals			494	39	162	201	151	26	0	5	5	18

=== International ===
Year	Team	Event	GP	G	A	Pts	PIM
1975	United States	WC	10	1	1	2	4
1979	United States	WC	8	1	1	2	5
Senior totals			18	2	2	4	9

== Awards and honors ==
Award	Year
All-WCHA First Team	1975–76; 1976–77
AHCA West All-American	1975–76; 1976–77

Miscellaneous: Set St. Louis single-season records (since broken) for assists (32) and points (44) by a defenseman in 1979–80. ... Set St. Louis single-season record (since broken) for assists by a defenseman (33 in 1981–82). ... Missed end of 1982 playoffs with bruised kidney. ... Missed parts of 1982–83 season with mild concussion and bruised kidney. ... Left unprotected by Hartford in 1986 NHL Waiver Draft and claimed by Buffalo in October 1986, but never played for parent team.
