= Dave Babych =

Canadian ice hockey player (born 1961)

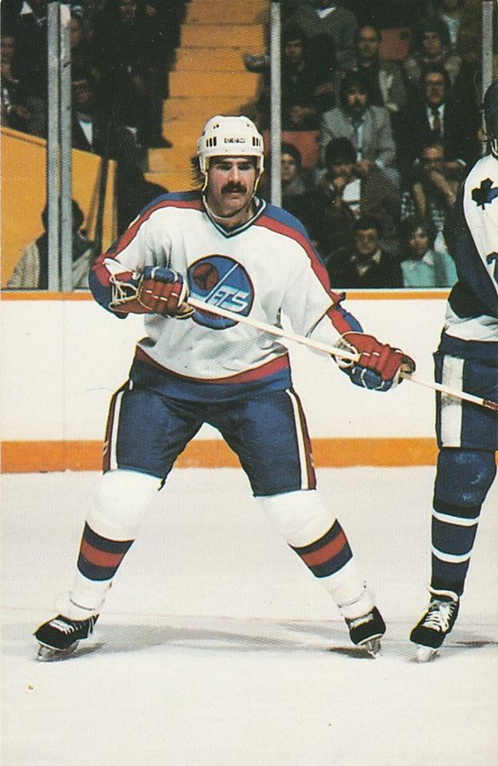
- Born: May 23, 1961 (age 65) Edmonton, Alberta, Canada
- Height: 6 ft 2 in (188 cm)
- Weight: 215 lb (98 kg; 15 st 5 lb)
- Position: Defence
- Shot: Left
- Played for: Winnipeg Jets; Hartford Whalers; Vancouver Canucks; Philadelphia Flyers; Los Angeles Kings; Ambrì-Piotta
- National team: Canada
- NHL draft: 2nd overall, 1980; Winnipeg Jets
- Playing career: 1980–1999

David Michael Babych (born May 23, 1961) is a Canadian former professional ice hockey defenceman who played 19 seasons in the National Hockey League (NHL) from 1980 to 1999. He is currently an assistant director of player personnel with the Vancouver Canucks. He played in two NHL All-Star Games and played for the Winnipeg Jets, Hartford Whalers, Vancouver Canucks, Philadelphia Flyers and Los Angeles Kings. David is the younger brother of former NHL player Wayne Babych. He was the first NHL player to wear the number 44 on a permanent basis.

== Playing career ==
=== Winnipeg Jets ===
Considered a franchise talent after a standout junior career in the Western Hockey League (WHL) with the Portland Winter Hawks, Babych was selected second overall in the 1980 NHL entry draft by the Winnipeg Jets. At the time of his selection, Babych and his brother Wayne (taken 3rd overall in 1978) were the highest-drafted pair of brothers in NHL history, a record matched by the Sedin twins (Daniel and Henrik) and broken by Pierre and Sylvain Turgeon. Babych stepped into the Jets lineup immediately as a teenager during the 1980–81 season, turning in a stellar rookie campaign in which he finished second on the club with 38 assists and led all Winnipeg blueliners with 44 points. Babych went on to lead all defenders on his team in scoring in each of his first 10 NHL seasons.

In 1981–82, Babych emerged as a star on a revitalized Winnipeg team which improved by 48 points with the addition of superstar rookie Dale Hawerchuk, setting franchise records for defencemen with 19 goals and 68 points in helping the Jets to their first-ever NHL playoff berth. Key to his improvement and development was the acquisition of veteran Serge Savard, a future Hall of Famer, to serve as his partner on the blueline. 1982–83 would be better yet, as he led the Jets with 61 assists and broke his own club record for defensive scoring with 74 points. He was also voted in as a starter for the Campbell Conference at the 1983 NHL All-Star Game.

Babych played in the All-Star game again in 1984, and turned in another excellent season, although he missed 14 games due to injury. In 1984–85, the Jets would have their best season ever, finishing fourth in the NHL with 96 points, and Babych - now forming a dynamic partnership on the blueline with former Norris Trophy winner Randy Carlyle - finished the year with 62 points to lead the team's defenders in scoring for the fifth consecutive season. He excelled in the 1985 playoffs, leading the team in scoring as they won their first-ever playoff series before being ousted by the Edmonton Oilers.

=== Hartford Whalers ===
Despite registering 16 points in his first 19 games to start the 1985–86 season, Babych was dealt to the Hartford Whalers for Ray Neufeld. Unpopular with Winnipeg fans at the time, the move would be a terrible one for the Jets as Neufeld was never more than a depth player for them and was out of the NHL by 1989, while Babych continued to excel for nearly another 15 years.

In Hartford, Babych continued his stellar play, finishing the season with 69 points - the second-highest total of his career - and was named the team's top defender. In 1986–87, he missed time with injury and finished with a career-low 41 points. However, he bounced back the following year to record another 50-point season, good for second on the Whalers in scoring. He was named the Whalers' top defender again in 1988–89, and led the team in playoff scoring with six points in four games. In 1989–90, he finished the year with 6 goals and 43 points, his 10th consecutive season over 40 points.

Babych suffered a serious wrist injury in 1990–91, requiring surgery shortly after the start of the season, causing him to miss 40 games. He then suffered a severely broken thumb almost immediately after his return, ruling him out for the rest of the campaign. He only appeared in eight games all season, recording six assists.

=== Vancouver Canucks ===
After missing almost all of the previous season to injury, Hartford exposed Babych in the 1991 NHL Expansion Draft, where he was selected by the Minnesota North Stars. However, he was almost immediately dealt to the Vancouver Canucks for Tom Kurvers.

While Babych was no longer the front-line defender he was earlier in his career, he continued to be a steady and valued contributor during his seven years in Vancouver, capable of showing flashes of his former offensive ability. Babych became the only defender in Canucks history to record a hat trick during the regular season, a feat he accomplished on November 22, 1991, against the Calgary Flames (Doug Halward also recorded a hat-trick for the Canucks in a playoff game). He finished the 1991–92 season with five goals and 29 points (second amongst Vancouver defenders, behind Jyrki Lumme), and was a key factor on a vastly improved Canuck team which won their division for the first time in 17 years. He also added eight points in 13 playoff games.

Injuries limited Babych to just 43 games in 1992–93, but he bounced back in 1993–94 with 32 points, his highest total since 1990. He continued to play inspired hockey in the playoffs as Vancouver reached the Stanley Cup Final, scoring the biggest goal of his career on June 9, 1994, in game five of the Final against the New York Rangers. After the Rangers came back from a 3–0 deficit to tie the game, Babych jumped into the rush and buried a pass from Pavel Bure to score the game-winning goal. It sparked a comeback in the series for Vancouver, who would narrowly lose the series in seven games.

Babych continued to toil steadily on the Canucks' blueline for another four seasons, although the team's fortunes went into decline. Most notable for Babych was a surprise offensive resurgence at the start of the 1995–96 campaign, which saw him amongst the league's highest-scoring defenders through the first month of the season.

=== Philadelphia Flyers and Los Angeles Kings ===
With the Canucks well out of the playoff race at the end of the 1997–98 season, the team dealt Babych to the Philadelphia Flyers for a low draft pick in order to give him a chance to play for a contending team. However, Babych missed a substantial amount of time after breaking his foot blocking a slap shot soon after his arrival in Philadelphia, and the Flyers were knocked out of the playoffs in the first round.

Babych continued to serve as a depth defender for the Flyers in 1998–99, before being dealt to the Los Angeles Kings at the trade deadline. He finished his final season with two goals and 8 points in 41 games between Philadelphia and Los Angeles. He had a brief stint in Switzerland in 2000 before retiring.

Babych finished his career with 142 goals and 581 assists for 723 points in 1195 NHL games, along with 970 penalty minutes. He added 21 goals and 41 assists for 62 points in 114 playoff games.

== Retirement ==
Babych made his home in North Vancouver, British Columbia, following his retirement. In December 2009, he was hired to work in a part-time capacity with the Vancouver Canucks as an assistant specializing in defencemen to director of player personnel Dave Gagner.

=== Lawsuit against the Flyers ===
Babych sued the Flyers and the team's orthopedic surgeon, Dr. Arthur Bartolozzi, in 2002, claiming that improper medical care for his 1998 foot injury shortened his career. Bartolozzi misdiagnosed the injury as a bone bruise rather than a fracture, and gave Babych painkillers so he could suit up for the first round of the playoffs. Babych claimed for many years that playing through the injury caused permanent damage which prematurely ended his career. Claiming that the Flyers and Bartolozzi had defrauded him, he sued for $2 million in lost wages. The Flyers were dismissed as a defendant before trial when a judge ruled there was no evidence of fraud on their part. While a jury found no evidence of fraud on Bartolozzi's part either, it found that he failed to follow accepted standards of care and awarded Babych US$1.02 million in lost wages and US$350,000 for pain and suffering in November 2002.

== Personal life ==
Babych, who is of Ukrainian ancestry, was born in Edmonton, Alberta.

Babych had a small role in the movie Slap Shot 2.

== Career statistics ==
=== Regular season and playoffs ===
			Regular season					Playoffs
Season	Team	League	GP	G	A	Pts	PIM	GP	G	A	Pts	PIM
1977–78	Fort Saskatchewan Traders	AJHL	56	31	69	100	37	—	—	—	—	—
1977–78	Portland Winter Hawks	WCHL	6	1	3	4	4	—	—	—	—	—
1978–79	Portland Winter Hawks	WHL	67	20	59	79	63	25	7	22	29	22
1979–80	Portland Winter Hawks	WHL	50	22	60	82	71	8	1	10	11	2
1980–81	Winnipeg Jets	NHL	69	6	38	44	90	—	—	—	—	—
1981–82	Winnipeg Jets	NHL	79	19	49	68	92	4	1	2	3	29
1982–83	Winnipeg Jets	NHL	79	13	61	74	56	3	0	0	0	0
1983–84	Winnipeg Jets	NHL	66	18	39	57	62	3	1	1	2	0
1984–85	Winnipeg Jets	NHL	78	13	49	62	78	8	2	7	9	6
1985–86	Winnipeg Jets	NHL	19	4	12	16	14	—	—	—	—	—
1985–86	Hartford Whalers	NHL	62	10	43	53	36	8	1	3	4	14
1986–87	Hartford Whalers	NHL	66	8	33	41	44	6	1	1	2	14
1987–88	Hartford Whalers	NHL	71	14	36	50	54	6	3	2	5	2
1988–89	Hartford Whalers	NHL	70	6	41	47	54	4	1	5	6	2
1989–90	Hartford Whalers	NHL	72	6	37	43	62	7	1	2	3	0
1990–91	Hartford Whalers	NHL	8	0	6	6	4	—	—	—	—	—
1991–92	Vancouver Canucks	NHL	75	5	24	29	63	13	2	6	8	10
1992–93	Vancouver Canucks	NHL	43	3	16	19	44	12	2	5	7	6
1993–94	Vancouver Canucks	NHL	73	4	28	32	52	24	3	5	8	12
1994–95	Vancouver Canucks	NHL	40	3	11	14	18	11	2	2	4	14
1995–96	Vancouver Canucks	NHL	53	3	21	24	38	—	—	—	—	—
1996–97	Vancouver Canucks	NHL	78	5	22	27	38	—	—	—	—	—
1997–98	Vancouver Canucks	NHL	47	0	9	9	37	—	—	—	—	—
1997–98	Philadelphia Flyers	NHL	6	0	0	0	12	5	1	0	1	4
1998–99	Philadelphia Flyers	NHL	33	2	4	6	20	—	—	—	—	—
1998–99	Los Angeles Kings	NHL	8	0	2	2	2	—	—	—	—	—
1999–2000	Ambrì-Piotta	NLA	1	0	0	0	0	2	0	0	0	0
NHL totals			1,195	142	581	723	970	114	21	41	62	113

=== International ===
Year	Team	Event	GP	G	A	Pts	PIM
1981	Canada	WC	7	0	2	2	8
1989	Canada	WC	10	2	0	2	4
Senior totals			17	2	2	4	12

== Awards ==
- WHL First All-Star Team – 1980

== See also ==
- List of NHL players with 1,000 games played

Preceded by Jimmy Mann	Winnipeg Jets first-round draft pick 1980	Succeeded by Dale Hawerchuk
