= Ray Neufeld =

Canadian ice hockey player

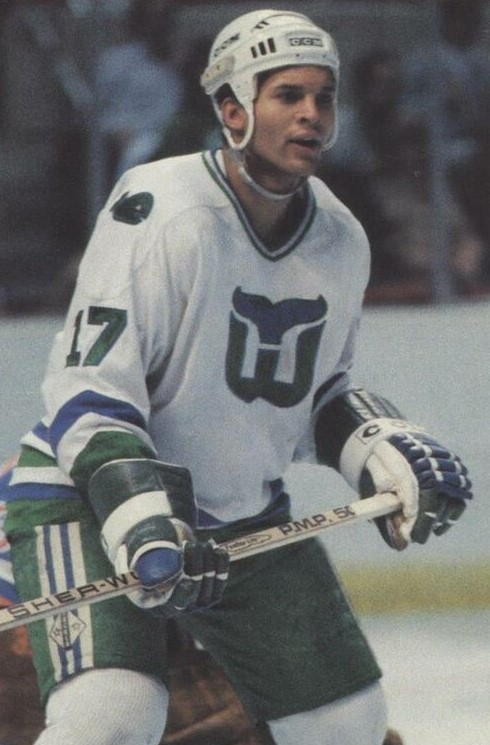
- Born: April 15, 1959 (age 66) St. Boniface, Manitoba, Canada
- Height: 6 ft 3 in (191 cm)
- Weight: 210 lb (95 kg; 15 st 0 lb)
- Position: Right wing
- Shot: Right
- Played for: Hartford Whalers; Winnipeg Jets; Boston Bruins
- NHL draft: 81st overall, 1979; Hartford Whalers
- Playing career: 1979–1990

Raymond Matthew Neufeld (born April 15, 1959) is a Canadian former professional ice hockey right winger originally from Winkler, Manitoba. He is currently working in the oil industry, but remains closely associated with minor and junior hockey as a scout in Alberta, Saskatchewan and Manitoba. Formerly, Neufeld was a radio commentator with TSN 1290 on Winnipeg Jets hockey broadcasts, and was assistant coach and the assistant general manager of the Winnipeg Blues of the Manitoba Junior Hockey League.

== Playing career ==
Neufeld's career started with the Hartford Whalers, before he was traded to the Winnipeg Jets for Dave Babych on November 21, 1985. He was traded to the Boston Bruins for Moe Lemay on December 30, 1988, where he finished his career two years later.

== Career statistics ==
| | | | Regular season | | | | | Playoffs |
| Season | Team | League | GP | G | A | Pts | PIM | GP | G | A | Pts | PIM |
|---|---|---|---|---|---|---|---|---|---|---|---|---|
| 1976–77 | Flin Flon Bombers | WCHL | 68 | 13 | 19 | 32 | 63 | — | — | — | — | — |
| 1977–78 | Flin Flon Bombers | WCHL | 72 | 23 | 46 | 69 | 224 | 15 | 4 | 4 | 8 | 39 |
| 1978–79 | Edmonton Oil Kings | WHL | 57 | 54 | 48 | 102 | 138 | 8 | 5 | 1 | 6 | 2 |
| 1979–80 | Hartford Whalers | NHL | 8 | 1 | 0 | 1 | 0 | 2 | 1 | 0 | 1 | 0 |
| 1979–80 | Springfield Indians | AHL | 73 | 23 | 29 | 52 | 51 | — | — | — | — | — |
| 1980–81 | Hartford Whalers | NHL | 52 | 5 | 10 | 15 | 44 | — | — | — | — | — |
| 1980–81 | Binghamton Whalers | AHL | 25 | 7 | 7 | 14 | 43 | 6 | 2 | 0 | 2 | 0 |
| 1981–82 | Hartford Whalers | NHL | 19 | 4 | 3 | 7 | 4 | — | — | — | — | — |
| 1981–82 | Binghamton Whalers | AHL | 61 | 28 | 31 | 59 | 81 | 15 | 9 | 8 | 17 | 10 |
| 1982–83 | Hartford Whalers | NHL | 80 | 26 | 31 | 57 | 86 | — | — | — | — | — |
| 1983–84 | Hartford Whalers | NHL | 80 | 27 | 42 | 69 | 97 | — | — | — | — | — |
| 1984–85 | Hartford Whalers | NHL | 76 | 27 | 35 | 62 | 129 | — | — | — | — | — |
| 1985–86 | Hartford Whalers | NHL | 16 | 5 | 10 | 15 | 40 | — | — | — | — | — |
| 1985–86 | Winnipeg Jets | NHL | 60 | 20 | 28 | 48 | 62 | 3 | 2 | 0 | 2 | 10 |
| 1986–87 | Winnipeg Jets | NHL | 80 | 18 | 18 | 36 | 105 | 8 | 1 | 1 | 2 | 30 |
| 1987–88 | Winnipeg Jets | NHL | 78 | 18 | 18 | 36 | 169 | 5 | 2 | 2 | 4 | 6 |
| 1988–89 | Winnipeg Jets | NHL | 31 | 5 | 2 | 7 | 52 | — | — | — | — | — |
| 1988–89 | Boston Bruins | NHL | 14 | 1 | 3 | 4 | 28 | 10 | 2 | 3 | 5 | 9 |
| 1989–90 | Boston Bruins | NHL | 1 | 0 | 0 | 0 | 0 | — | — | — | — | — |
| 1989–90 | Maine Mariners | AHL | 76 | 27 | 29 | 56 | 117 | — | — | — | — | — |
| NHL totals | | | 595 | 157 | 200 | 357 | 816 | 28 | 8 | 6 | 14 | 55 |
