= Lee Norwood =

American ice hockey player (born 1960)

- Born: February 2, 1960 (age 66) Oakland, California, U.S.
- Height: 6 ft 1 in (185 cm)
- Weight: 198 lb (90 kg; 14 st 2 lb)
- Position: Defense
- Shot: Left
- Played for: Quebec Nordiques; Washington Capitals; St. Louis Blues; Detroit Red Wings; New Jersey Devils; Hartford Whalers; Calgary Flames
- NHL draft: 62nd overall, 1979; Quebec Nordiques
- Playing career: 1980–1997

Lee Charles Norwood (born February 2, 1960) is an American former professional ice hockey defenceman. He played 12 seasons in the National Hockey League for seven different teams between 1980 and 1994.

== Playing career ==
Norwood was born in Oakland, California but moved with his family to Trenton, Michigan when he was three years old. He was drafted 62nd overall in the 1979 NHL entry draft by the Quebec Nordiques. During his 12-year NHL career, he played for the Nordiques, Washington Capitals, St. Louis Blues, Detroit Red Wings, New Jersey Devils, Hartford Whalers, and Calgary Flames. After his stint with the Flames, he retired from professional play in 1994, only to return to active play a year later in the International Hockey League for two seasons before retiring for a second and final time. Norwood was awarded the Governor's Trophy at the end of the 1984-85 IHL season for being the most outstanding defenseman in the league. In 503 NHL games, Norwood had 58 goals, 153 assists, and 1,099 penalty minutes.

== Post-playing career ==
Following retirement, Norwood was the head coach of the Central Texas Stampede of the Western Professional Hockey League for one season in 1997-98. He later served as the head coach of the Eastern Michigan University hockey team but left his position after the 2007–08 season. He currently does work on behalf of the Red Wings Alumni Association.

== Career statistics ==
=== Regular season and playoffs ===
			Regular season					Playoffs
Season	Team	League	GP	G	A	Pts	PIM	GP	G	A	Pts	PIM
1977–78	Hull Olympiques	QMJHL	51	3	17	20	78	3	1	0	1	2
1978–79	Oshawa Generals	OMJHL	61	23	38	61	171	5	2	2	4	17
1979–80	Oshawa Generals	OMJHL	60	13	39	52	143	6	2	7	9	15
1980–81	Quebec Nordiques	NHL	11	1	1	2	9	3	0	0	0	2
1980–81	Hershey Bears	AHL	52	11	32	43	78	8	0	4	4	14
1981–82	Quebec Nordiques	NHL	2	0	0	0	2	—	—	—	—	—
1981–82	Fredericton Express	AHL	29	6	13	19	74	—	—	—	—	—
1981–82	Washington Capitals	NHL	26	7	10	17	125	—	—	—	—	—
1982–83	Washington Capitals	NHL	8	0	1	1	14	—	—	—	—	—
1982–83	Hershey Bears	AHL	67	12	36	48	90	5	0	1	1	2
1983–84	St. Catharines Saints	AHL	75	13	46	59	91	7	0	5	5	31
1984–85	Peoria Rivermen	IHL	80	17	60	77	229	18	1	11	12	62
1985–86	St. Louis Blues	NHL	71	5	24	29	134	19	2	7	9	64
1986–87	Detroit Red Wings	NHL	57	6	21	27	163	16	1	6	7	31
1986–87	Adirondack Red Wings	AHL	3	0	3	3	0	—	—	—	—	—
1987–88	Detroit Red Wings	NHL	51	9	22	31	131	16	2	6	8	40
1988–89	Detroit Red Wings	NHL	66	10	32	42	100	6	1	2	3	16
1989–90	Detroit Red Wings	NHL	64	8	14	22	95	—	—	—	—	—
1990–91	Detroit Red Wings	NHL	21	3	7	10	50	—	—	—	—	—
1990–91	New Jersey Devils	NHL	28	3	2	5	87	4	0	0	0	18
1991–92	Hartford Whalers	NHL	6	0	0	0	16	—	—	—	—	—
1991–92	St. Louis Blues	NHL	44	3	11	14	87	1	0	1	1	0
1992–93	St. Louis Blues	NHL	32	3	7	10	63	—	—	—	—	—
1993–94	Calgary Flames	NHL	16	0	1	1	16	—	—	—	—	—
1993–94	San Diego Gulls	IHL	4	0	0	0	0	8	0	1	1	11
1995–96	Chicago Wolves	IHL	21	2	6	8	26	—	—	—	—	—
1995–96	Detroit Vipers	IHL	27	3	11	14	26	5	0	3	3	6
1996–97	Saginaw Lumber Kings	CoHL	12	3	3	6	8	—	—	—	—	—
1996–97	San Antonio Dragons	IHL	12	0	6	6	10	3	0	0	0	2
NHL totals			503	58	153	211	1099	65	6	22	28	171
