= Chris Kotsopoulos =

Canadian ice hockey player

- Born: November 27, 1958 (age 67) Scarborough, Ontario, Canada
- Height: 6 ft 3 in (191 cm)
- Weight: 215 lb (98 kg; 15 st 5 lb)
- Position: Defence
- Shot: Right
- Played for: New York Rangers; Hartford Whalers; Toronto Maple Leafs; Detroit Red Wings
- NHL draft: Undrafted
- Playing career: 1978–1990

Chris Kotsopoulos (Greek: Χρήστος Κωτσόπουλος; born November 27, 1958) is a Canadian former professional ice hockey player who played 479 games in the National Hockey League. He played for the New York Rangers, Hartford Whalers, Toronto Maple Leafs, and Detroit Red Wings. As a youth, he played in the 1971 Quebec International Pee-Wee Hockey Tournament with a minor ice hockey team from Toronto.

He is the former Quinnipiac Bobcats men's ice hockey analyst on AM1220 WQUN.

Chris is the co-host of the online Instigators Hockey Show.

== Career statistics ==
			Regular season					Playoffs
Season	Team	League	GP	G	A	Pts	PIM	GP	G	A	Pts	PIM
1974–75	Wexford Raiders	OPJHL	30	0	5	5	128	—	—	—	—	—
1975–76	Windsor Spitfires	OHL	59	3	13	16	169	—	—	—	—	—
1976–77	Acadia University	CIAU	—	—	—	—	—	—	—	—	—	—
1977–78	Acadia University	CIAU	17	0	7	7	72	—	—	—	—	—
1978–79	Toledo Goaldiggers	IHL	62	6	22	28	153	6	1	7	8	48
1979–80	New Haven Nighthawks	AHL	75	7	27	34	149	10	4	5	9	28
1980–81	New York Rangers	NHL	54	4	12	16	153	14	0	3	3	63
1981–82	Hartford Whalers	NHL	68	13	20	33	147	—	—	—	—	—
1982–83	Hartford Whalers	NHL	68	6	24	30	125	—	—	—	—	—
1983–84	Hartford Whalers	NHL	72	5	13	18	118	—	—	—	—	—
1984–85	Hartford Whalers	NHL	33	5	3	8	53	—	—	—	—	—
1985–86	Toronto Maple Leafs	NHL	61	6	11	17	83	10	1	0	1	14
1986–87	Toronto Maple Leafs	NHL	43	2	10	12	75	7	0	0	0	14
1987–88	Toronto Maple Leafs	NHL	21	2	2	4	19	—	—	—	—	—
1988–89	Toronto Maple Leafs	NHL	57	1	14	15	44	—	—	—	—	—
1989–90	Detroit Red Wings	NHL	2	0	0	0	10	—	—	—	—	—
1989–90	Adirondack Red Wings	AHL	24	2	4	6	4	4	0	0	0	2
NHL totals			479	44	109	153	827	31	1	3	4	91
