= 1988–89 Winnipeg Jets season =

NHL hockey team season

1988–89 Winnipeg Jets
- Division: 5th Smythe
- Conference: 9th Campbell
- 1988–89 record: 26–42–12
- Home record: 17–18–5
- Road record: 9–24–7
- Goals for: 300
- Goals against: 355

Team information
- General manager: John Ferguson; Mike Smith
- Coach: Dan Maloney and Rick Bowness
- Captain: Dale Hawerchuk
- Arena: Winnipeg Arena

Team leaders
- Goals: Dale Hawerchuk (41)
- Assists: Thomas Steen (61)
- Points: Dale Hawerchuk (96)
- Penalty minutes: Gord Donnelly (228)
- Wins: Pokey Reddick (11)
- Goals against average: Bob Essensa (3.70)

The 1988–89 Winnipeg Jets season saw the Jets finish in fifth place in the Smythe Division with a record of 26 wins, 42 losses, and 12 ties for 64 points, missing the playoffs for the first time since 1981.

== Off-season ==
After two seasons of leading the Jets into the playoffs, the club re-signed head coach Don Maloney to a contract extension through the 1990–91 season on May 16, 1988. At the 1988 NHL entry draft held on June 11, 1988, the Jets selected forward Teemu Selänne with their first round draft pick, tenth overall. Selanne spent the 1987–88 playing with Jokerit's junior hockey team, where in 33 games, he recorded 43 goals and 66 points.

On June 13, 1988, the Jets acquired Brent Ashton from the Detroit Red Wings in exchange for Paul MacLean. Ashton had 26 goals and 53 points in 73 games with the Red Wings in 1987–88. MacLean, who had been with Winnipeg since the 1981–82 season, had 40 goals and 79 points in 77 games. In total, MacLean broke the 40-goal plateau three times as a member with the Jets.

On July 19, 1988, Winnipeg made a trade with the New Jersey Devils, acquiring goaltender Alain Chevrier and the Devils' seventh-round pick in the 1989 NHL entry draft for Steve Rooney and the Jets' third-round pick in the 1990 NHL entry draft. Chevrier had a record of 18–19–3 with a 3.77 goals against average (GAA) in 45 games with the Devils in 1987–88, while Steve Rooney had 7 goals and 13 points, along with 217 penalty minutes, in 56 games with the Jets in 1987–88.

Late in training camp, on September 29, 1988, the Jets acquired Kent Carlson and the St. Louis Blues' tenth-round pick in the 1989 NHL Entry Draft and fourth-round pick in the 1990 NHL Entry Draft for Peter Douris. Carlson would then be traded one week into the 1988–89 season to the Washington Capitals. On October 3, 1988, the Jets picked Dave Hunter from the Edmonton Oilers in the NHL Waiver Draft. Hunter split the 1987–88 season between the Oilers and Pittsburgh Penguins, scoring 14 goals and 35 points in 80 games.

== Regular season ==
- January 13, 1989: In a victory over the Vancouver Canucks, Jets goaltender Eldon Reddick became the first goaltender in NHL history to not register a shutout in the first 100 games of his career.

Despite finishing last in goals allowed (355) in the NHL, the Jets had the NHL's fifth-best power-play percentage (22.13%).

=== Final standings ===
Smythe Division
	GP	W	L	T	GF	GA	Pts
**Calgary Flames**	80	54	17	9	354	226	117
**Los Angeles Kings**	80	42	31	7	376	335	91
**Edmonton Oilers**	80	38	34	8	325	306	84
**Vancouver Canucks**	80	33	39	8	251	253	74
Winnipeg Jets	80	26	42	12	300	355	64

Note: GP = Games played, W = Wins, L = Losses, T = Ties, Pts = Points, GF = Goals for, GA = Goals against
Note: Teams that qualified for the playoffs are highlighted in bold.

=== Record vs. opponents ===
==== Vs. Campbell Conference ====
**Vs. Smythe Division**

1988–89 NHL records
Team	**CGY**	**EDM**	**LAK**	**VAN**	**WIN**	**Total**
Calgary	—	5–2–1	6–2	5–1–2	5–2–1	**21–8–4**
Edmonton	2–5–1	—	4–4	3–5	4–3–1	**13–17–2**
Los Angeles	2–6	4–4	—	4–4	2–2–4	**12–16–4**
Vancouver	1–5–2	5–3	4–4	—	3–4–1	**13–16–3**
Winnipeg	2–5–1	3–4–1	2–2–4	4–3–1	—	**11–14–7**

**Vs. Norris Division**

1988–89 NHL records
Team	**CHI**	**DET**	**MIN**	**STL**	**TOR**	**Total**
Calgary	3–0	3–0	2–0–1	3–0	0–1–2	**11–1–3**
Edmonton	0–2–1	1–2	1–0–2	3–0	3–0	**8–4–3**
Los Angeles	3–0	3–0	2–1	1–2	3–0	**12–3–0**
Vancouver	2–1	0–0–3	1–2	3–0	1–2	**7–5–3**
Winnipeg	0–3	0–2–1	1–2	1–1–1	3–0	**5–8–2**

Vs. Wales Conference

**Vs. Adams Division**

1988–89 NHL records
Team	**BOS**	**BUF**	**HFD**	**MTL**	**QUE**	**Total**
Calgary	2–1	1–2	2–1	1–2	2–1	**8–7–0**
Edmonton	0–3	2–0–1	2–1	1–2	3–0	**8–6–1**
Los Angeles	1–2	3–0	2–1	0–3	3–0	**9–6–0**
Vancouver	1–2	2–1	1–1–1	0–3	2–1	**6–8–1**
Winnipeg	1–2	1–2	1–2	1–2	1–2	**5–10–0**

**Vs. Patrick Division**

1988–89 NHL records
Team	**NJD**	**NYI**	**NYR**	**PHI**	**PIT**	**WSH**	**Total**
Calgary	3–0	2–0–1	2–1	3–0	2–1	2–0–1	**14–2–2**
Edmonton	1–2	2–1	2–1	1–0–2	2–1	1–2	**9–7–2**
Los Angeles	1–0–2	2–1	1–2	2–1	2–1	1–1–1	**9–6–3**
Vancouver	1–1–1	1–2	0–3	3–0	1–2	1–2	**7–10–1**
Winnipeg	1–0–2	1–2	1–2	0–2–1	1–2	1–2	**5–10–3**

== Schedule and results ==
1988–89 regular season
October

Game	Result	Date	Score	Opponent	Record
1	T	October 6, 1988	2–2 OT	@ Vancouver Canucks (1988–89)	0–0–1
2	L	October 9, 1988	4–5	@ Edmonton Oilers (1988–89)	0–1–1
3	L	October 12, 1988	1–10	@ Chicago Blackhawks (1988–89)	0–2–1
4	W	October 14, 1988	4–3 OT	Vancouver Canucks (1988–89)	1–2–1
5	T	October 16, 1988	3–3 OT	Edmonton Oilers (1988–89)	1–2–2
6	L	October 19, 1988	2–5	Boston Bruins (1988–89)	1–3–2
7	W	October 23, 1988	3–2	Washington Capitals (1988–89)	2–3–2
8	L	October 28, 1988	4–7	Los Angeles Kings (1988–89)	2–4–2
9	W	October 30, 1988	8–4	Los Angeles Kings (1988–89)	3–4–2

November

Game	Result	Date	Score	Opponent	Record
10	W	November 1, 1988	8–1	@ New York Islanders (1988–89)	4–4–2
11	T	November 3, 1988	3–3 OT	@ New Jersey Devils (1988–89)	4–4–3
12	L	November 5, 1988	2–7	@ Montreal Canadiens (1988–89)	4–5–3
13	W	November 8, 1988	8–4	@ Quebec Nordiques (1988–89)	5–5–3
14	L	November 11, 1988	5–6 OT	Chicago Blackhawks (1988–89)	5–6–3
15	W	November 13, 1988	7–3	Montreal Canadiens (1988–89)	6–6–3
16	W	November 16, 1988	2–1 OT	@ Edmonton Oilers (1988–89)	7–6–3
17	W	November 18, 1988	3–0	Toronto Maple Leafs (1988–89)	8–6–3
18	W	November 20, 1988	7–4	Edmonton Oilers (1988–89)	9–6–3
19	L	November 25, 1988	3–6	@ Detroit Red Wings (1988–89)	9–7–3
20	T	November 26, 1988	4–4 OT	@ St. Louis Blues (1988–89)	9–7–4
21	L	November 29, 1988	3–4	New York Rangers (1988–89)	9–8–4

December

Game	Result	Date	Score	Opponent	Record
22	W	December 2, 1988	6–3	Vancouver Canucks (1988–89)	10–8–4
23	L	December 4, 1988	3–6	Calgary Flames (1988–89)	10–9–4
24	W	December 6, 1988	5–4 OT	@ Los Angeles Kings (1988–89)	11–9–4
25	T	December 8, 1988	5–5 OT	@ Los Angeles Kings (1988–89)	11–9–5
26	W	December 10, 1988	7–6	@ Edmonton Oilers (1988–89)	12–9–5
27	L	December 11, 1988	6–8	@ Vancouver Canucks (1988–89)	12–10–5
28	W	December 14, 1988	4–3	Buffalo Sabres (1988–89)	13–10–5
29	L	December 17, 1988	3–6	@ Washington Capitals (1988–89)	13–11–5
30	L	December 18, 1988	1–5	@ Philadelphia Flyers (1988–89)	13–12–5
31	T	December 21, 1988	5–5 OT	New Jersey Devils (1988–89)	13–12–6
32	L	December 23, 1988	4–5	Quebec Nordiques (1988–89)	13–13–6
33	L	December 26, 1988	1–5	@ Minnesota North Stars (1988–89)	13–14–6
34	W	December 28, 1988	6–2	St. Louis Blues (1988–89)	14–14–6
35	T	December 31, 1988	4–4 OT	@ Calgary Flames (1988–89)	14–14–7

January

Game	Result	Date	Score	Opponent	Record
36	W	January 4, 1989	4–2	Vancouver Canucks (1988–89)	15–14–7
37	T	January 6, 1989	4–4 OT	Los Angeles Kings (1988–89)	15–14–8
38	T	January 8, 1989	4–4 OT	Los Angeles Kings (1988–89)	15–14–9
39	L	January 10, 1989	1–2	Hartford Whalers (1988–89)	15–15–9
40	L	January 11, 1989	3–8	@ Calgary Flames (1988–89)	15–16–9
41	W	January 13, 1989	3–1	@ Vancouver Canucks (1988–89)	16–16–9
42	L	January 15, 1989	1–4	Minnesota North Stars (1988–89)	16–17–9
43	L	January 18, 1989	4–9	Edmonton Oilers (1988–89)	16–18–9
44	W	January 20, 1989	7–3	Pittsburgh Penguins (1988–89)	17–18–9
45	L	January 21, 1989	3–7	Philadelphia Flyers (1988–89)	17–19–9
46	L	January 25, 1989	4–5	@ Pittsburgh Penguins (1988–89)	17–20–9
47	L	January 26, 1989	6–8	@ New York Islanders (1988–89)	17–21–9
48	W	January 28, 1989	4–3	@ Boston Bruins (1988–89)	18–21–9
49	L	January 31, 1989	3–5	@ St. Louis Blues (1988–89)	18–22–9

February

Game	Result	Date	Score	Opponent	Record
50	L	February 1, 1989	4–7	@ Chicago Blackhawks (1988–89)	18–23–9
51	L	February 3, 1989	2–4	Boston Bruins (1988–89)	18–24–9
52	L	February 5, 1989	2–6	Detroit Red Wings (1988–89)	18–25–9
53	L	February 9, 1989	3–4	@ New York Rangers (1988–89)	18–26–9
54	L	February 11, 1989	3–7	@ Hartford Whalers (1988–89)	18–27–9
55	T	February 13, 1989	2–2 OT	@ Detroit Red Wings (1988–89)	18–27–10
56	L	February 15, 1989	1–6	Calgary Flames (1988–89)	18–28–10
57	W	February 17, 1989	3–2 OT	New Jersey Devils (1988–89)	19–28–10
58	W	February 19, 1989	7–6 OT	Hartford Whalers (1988–89)	20–28–10
59	L	February 21, 1989	3–4	@ Quebec Nordiques (1988–89)	20–29–10
60	L	February 22, 1989	3–6	@ Montreal Canadiens (1988–89)	20–30–10
61	L	February 24, 1989	4–5	@ Buffalo Sabres (1988–89)	20–31–10
62	W	February 26, 1989	1–0	Calgary Flames (1988–89)	21–31–10

March

Game	Result	Date	Score	Opponent	Record
63	T	March 1, 1989	4–4 OT	Philadelphia Flyers (1988–89)	21–31–11
64	L	March 3, 1989	4–7	Edmonton Oilers (1988–89)	21–32–11
65	L	March 5, 1989	3–4	New York Islanders (1988–89)	21–33–11
66	L	March 7, 1989	5–9	@ Calgary Flames (1988–89)	21–34–11
67	L	March 8, 1989	0–3	@ Vancouver Canucks (1988–89)	21–35–11
68	L	March 10, 1989	1–5	Pittsburgh Penguins (1988–89)	21–36–11
69	W	March 12, 1989	9–7	Toronto Maple Leafs (1988–89)	22–36–11
70	L	March 14, 1989	3–6	@ Washington Capitals (1988–89)	22–37–11
71	W	March 15, 1989	6–3	@ New York Rangers (1988–89)	23–37–11
72	W	March 18, 1989	10–2	@ Toronto Maple Leafs (1988–89)	24–37–11
73	L	March 20, 1989	1–4	Buffalo Sabres (1988–89)	24–38–11
74	L	March 23, 1989	4–5	@ Edmonton Oilers (1988–89)	24–39–11
75	W	March 24, 1989	4–3 OT	Calgary Flames (1988–89)	25–39–11
76	L	March 26, 1989	3–7	Vancouver Canucks (1988–89)	25–40–11
77	T	March 28, 1989	3–3 OT	@ Los Angeles Kings (1988–89)	25–40–12
78	L	March 29, 1989	1–2 OT	@ Los Angeles Kings (1988–89)	25–41–12
79	L	March 31, 1989	1–4	@ Calgary Flames (1988–89)	25–42–12

April

Game	Result	Date	Score	Opponent	Record
80	W	April 2, 1989	3–2	Minnesota North Stars (1988–89)	26–42–12

Legend: Win (2 points) Loss (0 points) Tie (1 point)

== Player statistics ==
=== Regular season ===
Scoring

Player	Pos	GP	G	A	Pts	PIM	+/-	PPG	SHG	GWG
Dale Hawerchuk	C	75	41	55	96	28	-30	14	3	4
Thomas Steen	C	80	27	61	88	80	14	9	1	2
Andrew McBain	RW	80	37	40	77	71	-35	20	1	3
Brent Ashton	LW	75	31	37	68	36	-5	7	1	1
Fredrik Olausson	D	75	15	47	62	32	6	4	0	1
Dave Ellett	D	75	22	34	56	62	-18	9	2	5
Pat Elynuik	RW	56	26	25	51	29	5	5	0	6
Iain Duncan	LW	57	14	30	44	74	-17	1	0	0
Randy Carlyle	D	78	6	38	44	78	-19	2	0	2
Laurie Boschman	C	70	10	26	36	163	-17	3	0	1
Doug Smail	LW	47	14	15	29	52	12	0	2	0
Paul Fenton	LW	59	14	9	23	33	-15	1	0	0
Gord Donnelly	D	57	6	10	16	228	-12	0	0	0
Teppo Numminen	D	69	1	14	15	36	-11	0	1	0
Peter Taglianetti	D	66	1	14	15	226	-23	1	0	0
Jim Kyte	D	74	3	9	12	190	-25	0	0	0
Brad Jones	LW	22	6	5	11	6	0	0	1	0
Hannu Jarvenpaa	RW	53	4	7	11	41	-14	1	0	0
Brad Berry	D	38	0	9	9	45	-8	0	0	0
Randy Gilhen	C	64	5	3	8	38	-24	0	1	1
Ray Neufeld	RW	31	5	2	7	52	-9	0	0	0
Brent Hughes	LW	28	3	2	5	82	-7	0	1	0
Dave Hunter	LW	34	3	1	4	61	-3	0	1	0
Alfie Turcotte	C	14	1	3	4	2	-6	0	0	0
Alain Chevrier	G	22	0	4	4	2	0	0	0	0
Stu Kulak	RW	18	2	0	2	24	-6	1	0	0
Mario Marois	D	7	1	1	2	17	-6	1	0	0
Markku Kyllonen	RW	9	0	2	2	2	-3	0	0	0
Tony Joseph	RW	2	1	0	1	0	1	0	0	0
Moe Lemay	LW	10	1	0	1	14	-3	0	0	0
Guy Larose	C	3	0	1	1	6	-1	0	0	0
Pokey Reddick	G	41	0	1	1	6	0	0	0	0
Daniel Berthiaume	G	9	0	0	0	0	0	0	0	0
Paul Boutilier	D	3	0	0	0	4	2	0	0	0
Darren Boyko	C	1	0	0	0	0	-1	0	0	0
Tom Draper	G	2	0	0	0	0	0	0	0	0
Bob Essensa	G	20	0	0	0	2	0	0	0	0
Steven Fletcher	LW/D	3	0	0	0	5	-1	0	0	0
Todd Flichel	D	1	0	0	0	0	-1	0	0	0
Gilles Hamel	LW	1	0	0	0	0	0	0	0	0
Matt Hervey	D	2	0	0	0	4	2	0	0	0
Bryan Marchment	D	2	0	0	0	2	0	0	0	0

Goaltending

Player	MIN	GP	W	L	T	GA	GAA	SO	SA	SV	SV%
Pokey Reddick	2109	41	11	17	7	144	4.10	0	1132	988	.873
Alain Chevrier	1092	22	8	8	2	78	4.29	1	554	476	.859
Bob Essensa	1102	20	6	8	3	68	3.70	1	574	506	.882
Tom Draper	120	2	1	1	0	12	6.00	0	66	54	.818
Daniel Berthiaume	443	9	0	8	0	44	5.96	0	255	211	.827
Team:	4866	80	26	42	12	346	4.27	2	2581	2235	.866

Note:

Pos = Position;GP = Games played; G = Goals; A = Assists; Pts = Points; PIM = Penalty minutes; +/- = Plus/minus; PPG = Power-play goals; SHG = Short-handed goals; GWG = Game-winning goals
Pos = Position;GP = Games played; Min, TOI = Minutes played; W = Wins; L = Losses; T,T/OT = Ties; OTL = Overtime losses; GA = Goals-against; GAA = Goals-against average; SO = Shutouts; SA = Shots against; SV = Shots saved;SV% = Save percentage;

== Transactions ==
=== Trades ===
July 19, 1988	To New Jersey Devils Steve Rooney; 3rd round pick in 1990 (Brad Bombardir)	To Winnipeg Jets Alain Chevrier; 7th round pick in 1989 (Doug Evans)
July 29, 1988	To Quebec Nordiques Joel Baillargeon	To Winnipeg Jets Future Considerations
September 29, 1988	To St. Louis Blues Peter Douris	To Winnipeg Jets Kent Carlson; 12th round pick in 1989 (Sergei Kharin); 4th round pick in 1990 (Scott Levins)
October 12, 1988	To Washington Capitals Kent Carlson	To Winnipeg Jets Future Considerations
November 25, 1988	To Los Angeles Kings Gilles Hamel	To Winnipeg Jets Paul Fenton
December 6, 1988	To Quebec Nordiques Mario Marois	To Winnipeg Jets Gord Donnelly
December 10, 1988	To Philadelphia Flyers Steven Fletcher	To Winnipeg Jets Future Considerations
December 30, 1988	To Boston Bruins Ray Neufeld	To Winnipeg Jets Moe Lemay
January 19, 1989	To Chicago Blackhawks Alain Chevrier	To Winnipeg Jets 4th round pick in 1989 (Allain Roy)
February 9, 1989	To Vancouver Canucks Jamie Husgen	To Winnipeg Jets Future Considerations
June 17, 1989	To Pittsburgh Penguins Randy Gilhen; Andrew McBain; Jim Kyte	To Winnipeg Jets Randy Cunneyworth; Rick Tabaracci; Dave McLlwain
June 17, 1989	To St. Louis Blues 3rd round pick in 1989 – Denny Felsner; 2nd round pick in 1991 (Steve Staios)	To Winnipeg Jets Greg Paslawski; 3rd round pick in 1989 (Kris Draper)

=== Waivers ===
October 3, 1988	From Edmonton Oilers Dave Hunter
January 14, 1989	To Edmonton Oilers Dave Hunter

=== Free agents ===
Player	Former team
Steven Fletcher	Montreal Canadiens
Matt Hervey	Undrafted Free Agent

== Draft picks ==
The Jets selected the following players at the 1988 NHL entry draft, which was held at the Montreal Forum in Montreal, on June 11, 1988.

=== NHL amateur draft ===
Round	Pick	Player	Nationality	College/Junior/Club team
1	10	Teemu Selanne (RW)	Finland	Jokerit (SM-liiga)
2	31	Russ Romaniuk (LW)	Canada	St. Boniface Saints (MJHL)
3	52	Stephane Beauregard (G)	Canada	St. Jean Beavers (QMJHL)
4	73	Brian Hunt (C)	Canada	Oshawa Generals (OHL)
5	94	Tony Joseph (RW)	Canada	Oshawa Generals (OHL)
5	101	Ben Lebeau (FWD)	United States	Merrimack College (NCAA)
6	115	Ron Jones (RW)	United States	Windsor Spitfires (OHL)
7	127	Markus Akerblom (RW)	Sweden	IF Björklöven (SEL)
7	136	Jukka Marttila (D)	Finland	Tappara (SM-liiga)
8	157	Mark Smith (LW)	United States	Trinity High School (Garfield Heights, Ohio)
9	178	Mike Helber (C)	United States	Pioneer High School (Ann Arbor, Michigan)
10	199	Pavel Kostichkin (RW)	Soviet Union	CSKA Moscow (Soviet Union)
11	220	Kevin Heise (LW)	Canada	Lethbridge Hurricanes (WHL)
12	241	Kyle Galloway (D)	Canada	University of Manitoba (CIAU)

=== NHL supplemental draft ===
Winnipeg selected one player at the 1988 NHL supplemental draft.

Round	Pick	Player	Nationality	College/Junior/Club team
2	15	Mike O'Neill (G)	Canada	Yale University (NCAA)
