= 1988–89 Toronto Maple Leafs season =

NHL hockey team season

1988–89 Toronto Maple Leafs
- Division: 5th Norris
- Conference: 10th Campbell
- 1988–89 record: 28–46–6
- Home record: 15–20–5
- Road record: 13–26–1
- Goals for: 259
- Goals against: 342

Team information
- General manager: Gord Stellick
- Coach: John Brophy (fired); George Armstrong (interim)
- Captain: Vacant
- Alternate captains: Wendel Clark; Borje Salming; Tom Fergus
- Arena: Maple Leaf Gardens

Team leaders
- Goals: Eddie Olczyk (38)
- Assists: Eddie Olczyk (52)
- Points: Eddie Olczyk (90)
- Penalty minutes: Brian Curran and John Kordic (185)
- Plus/minus: Dave Reid (+12)
- Wins: Allan Bester (17)
- Goals against average: Allan Bester (3.80)

The 1988–89 Toronto Maple Leafs season was Toronto's 72nd season in the National Hockey League (NHL). Toronto made a late season push for the playoffs under interim head coach (and former captain) George Armstrong but an overtime loss in the final regular season game at the Chicago Blackhawks kept them out of the postseason for the first time since the 1984–85 season. It was also the first time since the 1984–85 season that they finished last in their conference.

== Off-season ==
=== NHL draft ===
Round	Pick	Player	Nationality	College/Junior/Club team
1	6	Scott Pearson (LW)	Canada	Kingston Canadians (OHL)
2	27	Tie Domi (RW)	Canada	Peterborough Petes (OHL)
3	48	Peter Ing (G)	Canada	Windsor Spitfires (OHL)
4	69	Ted Crowley (D)	United States	Lawrence Academy (USHS-MA)
5	86	Len Esau (D)	Canada	Humboldt Broncos (SJHL)
7	132	Matt Mallgrave (C)	United States	St. Paul's School (USHS-NH)
8	153	Roger Elvenes (C)	Sweden	Rögle BK (Sweden)
9	174	Mike DeLay (D)	United States	Canterbury School (USHS-CT)
10	195	David Sacco (C)	United States	Medford High School (USHS-MA)
11	216	Mike Gregorio (G)	United States	Cushing Academy (USHS-MA)
12	237	Peter DeBoer (RW)	Canada	Windsor Spitfires (OHL)
S	11	Dean Anderson (G)	Canada	University of Wisconsin (WCHA)

== Regular season ==
The 1988–89 Maple Leafs season was a disastrous one that saw John Brophy fired as head coach midway through the season. Interim head coach George Armstrong led the Leafs close to the playoffs, but they eventually missed out after losing to the Chicago Blackhawks in the final game of the regular season. The Leafs needed a win against Chicago to clinch a playoff berth, but a Troy Murray overtime goal ended Toronto's season.

The Maple Leafs finished the regular season last in the NHL in power play goals scored (56), power play opportunities (334), power play percentage (16.77%) and penalty-killing percentage (72.70%).

- November 7, 1988 – The Maple Leafs traded RW Russ Courtnall to Montreal for RW John Kordic and a 6th-round choice (Michael Doers)
- Ken Wregget was traded by Maple Leafs to Philadelphia Flyers for two first-round picks (RW Rob Pearson and D Steve Bancroft) in 1989 draft, March 6, 1989.

=== Final standings ===
Norris Division
	GP	W	L	T	GF	GA	Pts
**Detroit Red Wings**	80	34	34	12	313	316	80
**St. Louis Blues**	80	33	35	12	275	285	78
**Minnesota North Stars**	80	27	37	16	258	278	70
**Chicago Blackhawks**	80	27	41	12	297	335	66
Toronto Maple Leafs	80	28	46	6	259	342	62

Note: GP = Games played, W = Wins, L = Losses, T = Ties, Pts = Points, GF = Goals for, GA = Goals against
Note: Teams that qualified for the playoffs are highlighted in bold.

=== Record vs. opponents ===
==== Vs. Campbell Conference ====
**Vs. Norris Division**

1988–89 NHL records
Team	**CHI**	**DET**	**MIN**	**STL**	**TOR**	**Total**
Chicago	—	4–2–2	4–2–2	1–6–1	3–3–2	**12–13–7**
Detroit	2–4–2	—	5–3	3–3–2	5–3	**15–13–4**
Minnesota	2–4–2	3–5	—	2–3–3	3–4–1	**10–16–6**
St. Louis	6–1–1	3–3–2	3–2–3	—	6–2	**18–8–6**
Toronto	3–3–2	3–5	4–3–1	2–6	—	**12–17–3**

**Vs. Smythe Division**

1988–89 NHL records
Team	**CGY**	**EDM**	**LAK**	**VAN**	**WIN**	**Total**
Chicago	0–3	2–0–1	0–3	1–2	3–0	**6–8–1**
Detroit	0–3	2–1	0–3	0–0–3	2–0–1	**4–7–4**
Minnesota	0–2–1	0–1–2	1–2	2–1	2–1	**5–7–3**
St. Louis	0–3	0–3	2–1	0–3	1–1–1	**3–11–1**
Toronto	1–0–2	0–3	0–3	2–1	0–3	**3–10–2**

Vs. Wales Conference

**Vs. Adams Division**

1988–89 NHL records
Team	**BOS**	**BUF**	**HFD**	**MTL**	**QUE**	**Total**
Chicago	0–3	1–2	1–2	0–1–2	2–0–1	**4–8–3**
Detroit	2–0–1	0–3	1–2	2–1	1–2	**6–8–1**
Minnesota	2–0–1	1–0–2	1–2	0–1–2	1–2	**5–5–5**
St. Louis	0–3	2–1	0–1–2	0–2–1	3–0	**5–7–3**
Toronto	0–3	1–2	1–2	1–2	3–0	**6–9–0**

**Vs. Patrick Division**

1988–89 NHL records
Team	**NJD**	**NYI**	**NYR**	**PHI**	**PIT**	**WSH**	**Total**
Chicago	1–2	3–0	0–2–1	0–3	0–3	1–2	**5–12–1**
Detroit	0–2–1	3–0	3–0	2–1	0–2–1	1–1–1	**9–6–3**
Minnesota	1–1–1	1–2	1–2	1–2	2–1	1–1–1	**7–9–2**
St. Louis	1–2	2–1	0–3	3–0	1–1–1	0–2–1	**7–9–2**
Toronto	1–2	2–1	1–1–1	1–2	1–2	1–2	**7–10–1**

== Schedule and results ==
1988–89 regular season
October

Game	Result	Date	Score	Opponent	Record
1	L	October 6, 1988	1–2	@ Boston Bruins (1988–89)	0–1–0
2	W	October 8, 1988	7–4	Chicago Blackhawks (1988–89)	1–1–0
3	W	October 9, 1988	8–4	@ Chicago Blackhawks (1988–89)	2–1–0
4	L	October 12, 1988	2–4	St. Louis Blues (1988–89)	2–2–0
5	W	October 14, 1988	3–1	@ Washington Capitals (1988–89)	3–2–0
6	L	October 15, 1988	3–5	Detroit Red Wings (1988–89)	3–3–0
7	W	October 17, 1988	6–2	@ Montreal Canadiens (1988–89)	4–3–0
8	W	October 19, 1988	4–2	Buffalo Sabres (1988–89)	5–3–0
9	W	October 21, 1988	4–2	@ Detroit Red Wings (1988–89)	6–3–0
10	T	October 22, 1988	3–3 OT	Calgary Flames (1988–89)	6–3–1
11	W	October 25, 1988	4–3	@ New York Islanders (1988–89)	7–3–1
12	W	October 26, 1988	3–2	@ Minnesota North Stars (1988–89)	8–3–1
13	L	October 29, 1988	2–3	@ St. Louis Blues (1988–89)	8–4–1

November

Game	Result	Date	Score	Opponent	Record
14	L	November 2, 1988	2–7	Boston Bruins (1988–89)	8–5–1
15	L	November 5, 1988	4–6	Los Angeles Kings (1988–89)	8–6–1
16	L	November 10, 1988	1–5	@ Pittsburgh Penguins (1988–89)	8–7–1
17	L	November 12, 1988	2–6	Edmonton Oilers (1988–89)	8–8–1
18	L	November 14, 1988	4–5	Minnesota North Stars (1988–89)	8–9–1
19	W	November 16, 1988	8–5	Pittsburgh Penguins (1988–89)	9–9–1
20	L	November 18, 1988	0–3	@ Winnipeg Jets (1988–89)	9–10–1
21	L	November 19, 1988	1–9	@ Edmonton Oilers (1988–89)	9–11–1
22	W	November 21, 1988	4–0	St. Louis Blues (1988–89)	10–11–1
23	W	November 23, 1988	4–3	Chicago Blackhawks (1988–89)	11–11–1
24	L	November 25, 1988	3–5	@ Minnesota North Stars (1988–89)	11–12–1
25	L	November 26, 1988	3–6	Minnesota North Stars (1988–89)	11–13–1

December

Game	Result	Date	Score	Opponent	Record
26	L	December 1, 1988	3–9	@ Los Angeles Kings (1988–89)	11–14–1
27	L	December 3, 1988	0–3	@ St. Louis Blues (1988–89)	11–15–1
28	L	December 9, 1988	3–4	@ Detroit Red Wings (1988–89)	11–16–1
29	L	December 10, 1988	2–8	Detroit Red Wings (1988–89)	11–17–1
30	T	December 12, 1988	4–4 OT	Calgary Flames (1988–89)	11–17–2
31	L	December 14, 1988	2–8	Edmonton Oilers (1988–89)	11–18–2
32	L	December 15, 1988	3–6	@ New Jersey Devils (1988–89)	11–19–2
33	L	December 17, 1988	1–7	Philadelphia Flyers (1988–89)	11–20–2
34	W	December 19, 1988	4–3	St. Louis Blues (1988–89)	12–20–2
35	L	December 21, 1988	1–6	Pittsburgh Penguins (1988–89)	12–21–2
36	L	December 23, 1988	2–5	@ Buffalo Sabres (1988–89)	12–22–2
37	L	December 26, 1988	3–4	New York Islanders (1988–89)	12–23–2
38	W	December 29, 1988	6–5	@ Quebec Nordiques (1988–89)	13–23–2
39	W	December 31, 1988	6–1	Quebec Nordiques (1988–89)	14–23–2

January

Game	Result	Date	Score	Opponent	Record
40	T	January 1, 1989	3–3 OT	@ Chicago Blackhawks (1988–89)	14–23–3
41	L	January 6, 1989	0–3	@ Washington Capitals (1988–89)	14–24–3
42	L	January 7, 1989	1–6	Buffalo Sabres (1988–89)	14–25–3
43	W	January 9, 1989	3–0	Vancouver Canucks (1988–89)	15–25–3
44	L	January 11, 1989	2–3	Washington Capitals (1988–89)	15–26–3
45	L	January 14, 1989	3–5	Montreal Canadiens (1988–89)	15–27–3
46	W	January 16, 1989	5–3	Hartford Whalers (1988–89)	16–27–3
47	T	January 19, 1989	3–3 OT	Minnesota North Stars (1988–89)	16–27–4
48	L	January 21, 1989	3–4	@ Montreal Canadiens (1988–89)	16–28–4
49	L	January 25, 1989	1–2 OT	Boston Bruins (1988–89)	16–29–4
50	L	January 27, 1989	1–8	@ Detroit Red Wings (1988–89)	16–30–4
51	T	January 28, 1989	1–1 OT	New York Rangers (1988–89)	16–30–5
52	L	January 30, 1989	1–7	@ Chicago Blackhawks (1988–89)	16–31–5

February

Game	Result	Date	Score	Opponent	Record
53	W	February 2, 1989	4–1	@ New York Islanders (1988–89)	17–31–5
54	L	February 4, 1989	1–3	Chicago Blackhawks (1988–89)	17–32–5
55	W	February 11, 1989	4–3	Philadelphia Flyers (1988–89)	18–32–5
56	L	February 13, 1989	1–8	@ New Jersey Devils (1988–89)	18–33–5
57	L	February 15, 1989	2–4	Hartford Whalers (1988–89)	18–34–5
58	W	February 17, 1989	10–6	@ New York Rangers (1988–89)	19–34–5
59	W	February 18, 1989	5–3	New Jersey Devils (1988–89)	20–34–5
60	L	February 20, 1989	4–5	@ Los Angeles Kings (1988–89)	20–35–5
61	W	February 22, 1989	4–3 OT	@ Calgary Flames (1988–89)	21–35–5
62	L	February 23, 1989	1–2 OT	@ Vancouver Canucks (1988–89)	21–36–5
63	W	February 25, 1989	4–2	@ Minnesota North Stars (1988–89)	22–36–5
64	L	February 27, 1989	5–7	St. Louis Blues (1988–89)	22–37–5

March

Game	Result	Date	Score	Opponent	Record
65	L	March 1, 1989	4–7	@ New York Rangers (1988–89)	22–38–5
66	T	March 4, 1989	3–3 OT	Chicago Blackhawks (1988–89)	22–38–6
67	L	March 5, 1989	0–3	@ Hartford Whalers (1988–89)	22–39–6
68	W	March 7, 1989	6–4	@ Quebec Nordiques (1988–89)	23–39–6
69	L	March 9, 1989	1–4	@ St. Louis Blues (1988–89)	23–40–6
70	W	March 11, 1989	5–3	Detroit Red Wings (1988–89)	24–40–6
71	L	March 12, 1989	7–9	@ Winnipeg Jets (1988–89)	24–41–6
72	W	March 14, 1989	5–3	@ Minnesota North Stars (1988–89)	25–41–6
73	L	March 18, 1989	2–10	Winnipeg Jets (1988–89)	25–42–6
74	L	March 19, 1989	6–8	@ Philadelphia Flyers (1988–89)	25–43–6
75	W	March 22, 1989	5–3	Vancouver Canucks (1988–89)	26–43–6
76	L	March 24, 1989	2–6	@ Detroit Red Wings (1988–89)	26–44–6
77	W	March 25, 1989	6–5	Detroit Red Wings (1988–89)	27–44–6
78	W	March 29, 1989	3–1	Minnesota North Stars (1988–89)	28–44–6

April

Game	Result	Date	Score	Opponent	Record
79	L	April 1, 1989	3–4 OT	@ St. Louis Blues (1988–89)	28–45–6
80	L	April 2, 1989	3–4 OT	@ Chicago Blackhawks (1988–89)	28–46–6

Legend: Win (2 points) Loss (0 points) Tie (1 point)

== Player statistics ==
=== Forwards ===
Note: GP= Games played; G= Goals; AST= Assists; PTS = Points; PIM = Points

Player	GP	G	AST	PTS	PIM
Eddie Olczyk	80	38	52	90	75
Gary Leeman	61	32	43	75	66
Vincent Damphousse	80	26	42	68	75
Tom Fergus	80	22	45	67	48
Daniel Marois	76	31	23	54	76
Mark Osborne	75	16	30	46	112
Dave Reid	77	9	21	30	22
Craig Laughlin	66	10	13	23	41
Peter Ihnacak	26	2	16	18	10
Derek Laxdal	41	9	6	15	65
Al Secord	40	5	10	15	71
Dan Daoust	68	7	5	12	54
Wendel Clark	15	7	4	11	66
Paul Gagne	16	3	2	5	6
John Kordic	46	1	2	3	185
Russ Courtnall	9	1	1	2	4
Tim Armstrong	11	1	0	1	6
Mike Blaisdell	9	1	0	1	4
Ken Yaremchuk	11	1	0	1	2
Scott Pearson	9	0	1	1	2
Sean McKenna	3	0	1	1	0
Paul Lawless	7	0	0	0	0
Marty Dallman	4	0	0	0	0
Chris McRae	3	0	0	0	12
Doug Shedden	1	0	0	0	2

=== Defencemen ===
Note: GP= Games played; G= Goals; AST= Assists; PTS = Points; PIM = Points

Player	GP	G	AST	PTS	PIM
Al Iafrate	65	13	20	33	72
Todd Gill	59	11	14	25	72
Borje Salming	63	3	17	20	86
Brad Marsh	80	1	15	16	79
Chris Kotsopoulos	57	1	14	15	44
Darren Veitch	37	3	7	10	16
Rick Lanz	32	1	9	10	18
Luke Richardson	55	2	7	9	106
Brian Curran	47	1	4	5	185
Darryl Shannon	14	1	3	4	6
Ken Hammond	14	0	2	2	12

=== Goaltending ===
Note: GP= Games played; W= Wins; L= Losses; T = Ties; SO = Shutouts; GAA = Goals Against

Player	GP	W	L	T	SO	GAA
Allan Bester	43	17	20	3	2	3.80
Ken Wregget	32	9	20	2	0	4.42
Jeff Reese	10	2	6	1	0	4.94

== Awards and records ==
- Gary Leeman, Molson Cup (Most game star selections for Toronto Maple Leafs)

40th National Hockey League All-Star Game

- Gary Leeman, Reserve, Campbell Conference

== Transactions ==
The Maple Leafs have been involved in the following transactions in the 1988–89 season.

=== Trades ===
June 21, 1988	To Philadelphia Flyers Mike Stothers	To Toronto Maple Leafs Bill Root
November 7, 1988	To Montreal Canadiens Russ Courtnall	To Toronto Maple Leafs John Kordic; 6th round pick in 1989 – Mike Doers
February 7, 1989	To Philadelphia Flyers Al Secord	To Toronto Maple Leafs 5th round pick in 1989 – Keith Carney
February 21, 1989	To New York Rangers Chris McRae	To Toronto Maple Leafs Ken Hammond
February 25, 1989	To Vancouver Canucks Peter DeBoer	To Toronto Maple Leafs Paul Lawless
March 6, 1989	To Philadelphia Flyers Ken Wregget	To Toronto Maple Leafs 1st round pick in 1989 – Rob Pearson; 1st round pick in 1989 – Steve Bancroft
June 16, 1989	To Calgary Flames 2nd round pick in 1989 – Kent Manderville	To Toronto Maple Leafs Rob Ramage

=== Waivers ===
October 3, 1988	To Los Angeles Kings Dale DeGray
October 3, 1988	From Philadelphia Flyers Brad Marsh

=== Free agents ===
Player	Former team
Craig Laughlin	Los Angeles Kings
Alan Hepple	New Jersey Devils
Paul Gagne	New Jersey Devils
Doug Shedden	Baltimore Skipjacks (AHL)
