= 1988–89 Quebec Nordiques season =

National Hockey League team season

1988–89 Quebec Nordiques
- Division: 5th Adams
- Conference: 11th Wales
- 1988–89 record: 27–46–7
- Home record: 16–20–4
- Road record: 11–26–3
- Goals for: 269
- Goals against: 342

Team information
- General manager: Martin Madden
- Coach: Ron Lapointe and Jean Perron
- Captain: Peter Stastny
- Arena: Colisée de Québec

Team leaders
- Goals: Walt Poddubny (38)
- Assists: Peter Stastny (50)
- Points: Peter Stastny (85)
- Penalty minutes: Steven Finn (235)
- Wins: Mario Gosselin (11)
- Goals against average: Ron Tugnutt (3.60)

The 1988–89 Quebec Nordiques season saw the team finish in fifth place in the Adams Division with a record of 27 wins, 46 losses, and 7 ties for 61 points.

== Off-season ==
Quebec announced that interim head coach Ron Lapointe would come back on a permanent basis as head coach of the team. Lapointe had a 22-30-4 record with the Nordiques in 1987–88.

At the 1988 NHL entry draft, Quebec had two picks in the first round, the third overall pick, and the fifth overall pick. The Nordiques selected Curtis Leschyshyn of the Saskatoon Blades with the third pick. He had 14 goals and 55 points, and would see regular playing time with Quebec in the upcoming season. With the fifth pick, the Nordiques selected Daniel Dore. Dore had 24 goals, 63 points and 223 penalty minutes with the Drummondville Voltigeurs in 1987–88. In the later rounds of the draft, Quebec selected Valeri Kamensky and Alexei Gusarov of CSKA Moscow.

The Nordiques made some trades during the summer months, as they dealt away Mike Eagles to the Chicago Blackhawks for Bob Mason. Mason appeared in 41 games with Chicago, going 13-18-8 with a 4.15 GAA in 1987–88. Quebec then traded away Terry Carkner to the Philadelphia Flyers for Greg Smyth and the Flyers third round draft pick in the 1989 NHL entry draft. Smyth had a goal and seven points in 48 games with Philadelphia, as well as 192 penalty minutes.

Quebec's biggest trade of the summer was trading away Normand Rochefort and Jason Lafreniere to the New York Rangers for Bruce Bell, Jari Gronstrand, Walt Poddubny, and the Rangers fourth round draft pick in the 1989 NHL entry draft. Bell played his rookie season with the Nordiques in 1984–85, however, he spent most of the 1987–88 season with the Colorado Rangers of the IHL, where he had 11 goals and 45 points in 65 games. In 13 games with New York, Bell had a goal and two assists. Poddubny was coming off of a 38-goal and 88 point season with the Rangers in 1987–88. Poddubny scored 40 goals and 87 points with New York in 1986–87. Gronstrand had three goals and 14 points on the Rangers blueline in 1987–88.

== Regular season ==
The Nordiques began the season with three wins in their first four games, however, Quebec would slump, and fall to 6-12-2 after twenty games. The team made some trades in December, acquiring former team captain Mario Marois from the Winnipeg Jets, however, the club continued to lose, and had an 11-20-2 record after 33 games. The Nordiques then fired Lapointe as head coach, and replaced him with Jean Perron on an interim basis. Perron had coached the Montreal Canadiens to the 1986 Stanley Cup. Under Perron, the club continued to lose, as Quebec quickly fell out of the playoff race. The team finished the season with a 27-46-7 record, earning 61 points, which was 18 points behind the Hartford Whalers for the final playoff spot in the Adams Division, and tied with the New York Islanders with the lowest point total in the league, On the basis of the Islanders winning more games (28–27), the Nords claimed last place in the overall standings.

Captain Peter Stastny led the club with 85 points, as he scored 35 goals and 50 assists in 72 games. Walt Poddubny scored a team high 38 goals in his first season with the Nordiques, as he also had 37 assists for 75 points. Michel Goulet saw his numbers drop to 26 goals and 64 points, his lowest totals since his rookie season in 1979–80. Rookie Joe Sakic had 23 goals and 62 points.

Jeff Brown had another solid season on the Nordiques blueline, scoring 21 goals and 68 points, good for third on team scoring. Brown had 13 powerplay goals, tied with Peter Stastny for second on the team, one behind team leader Walt Poddubny.

In goal, Mario Gosselin saw the majority of action, appearing in 39 games, earning 11 wins and a 4.24 GAA. Bob Mason had a tough season, earning only five wins in 22 games with a 4.73 GAA, while Ron Tugnutt had a 10-10-3 record in 26 games, with a team best 3.60 GAA and a.893 save percentage.

=== Final standings ===
Adams Division
	GP	W	L	T	GF	GA	Pts
**Montreal Canadiens**	80	53	18	9	315	218	115
**Boston Bruins**	80	37	29	14	289	256	88
**Buffalo Sabres**	80	38	35	7	291	299	83
**Hartford Whalers**	80	37	38	5	299	290	79
Quebec Nordiques	80	27	46	7	269	342	61

Note: GP = Games played, W = Wins, L = Losses, T = Ties, Pts = Points, GF = Goals for, GA = Goals against
Note: Teams that qualified for the playoffs are highlighted in bold.

=== Record vs. opponents ===
==== Vs. Wales Conference ====
**Vs. Adams Division**

1988–89 NHL records
Team	**BOS**	**BUF**	**HFD**	**MTL**	**QUE**	**Total**
Boston	—	0–5–3	5–3	0–7–1	4–1–3	**9–16–7**
Buffalo	5–0–3	—	3–5	3–5	3–4–1	**14–13–5**
Hartford	3–5	5–3	—	1–7	4–3–1	**13–18–1**
Montreal	7–0–1	5–3	7–1	—	4–4	**23–8–1**
Quebec	1–4–3	4–3–1	3–4–1	4–4	—	**12–15–5**

**Vs. Patrick Division**

1988–89 NHL records
Team	**NJD**	**NYI**	**NYR**	**PHI**	**PIT**	**WSH**	**Total**
Boston	2–0–1	2–1	1–0–2	2–1	1–1–1	1–1–1	**9–4–5**
Buffalo	2–1	3–0	3–0	1–2	2–1	0–3	**11–7–0**
Hartford	2–1	2–1	2–1	1–1–1	2–1	0–3	**9–8–1**
Montreal	3–0	1–2	3–0	1–0–2	2–1	1–1–1	**11–4–3**
Quebec	2–1	1–2	1–2	1–2	2–1	0–2–1	**7–10–1**

==== Vs. Campbell Conference ====
**Vs. Norris Division**

1988–89 NHL records
Team	**CHI**	**DET**	**MIN**	**STL**	**TOR**	**Total**
Boston	3–0	0–2–1	0–2–1	3–0	3–0	**9–4–2**
Buffalo	2–1	3–0	0–1–2	1–2	2–1	**8–5–2**
Hartford	2–1	2–1	2–1	1–0–2	2–1	**9–4–2**
Montreal	1–0–2	1–2	1–0–2	2–0–1	2–1	**7–3–5**
Quebec	0–2–1	2–1	2–1	0–3	0–3	**4–10–1**

**Vs. Smythe Division**

1988–89 NHL records
Team	**CGY**	**EDM**	**LAK**	**VAN**	**WIN**	**Total**
Boston	1–2	3–0	2–1	2–1	2–1	**10–5–0**
Buffalo	2–1	0–2–1	0–3	1–2	2–1	**5–9–1**
Hartford	1–2	1–2	1–2	1–1–1	2–1	**6–8–1**
Montreal	2–1	2–1	3–0	3–0	2–1	**12–3–0**
Quebec	1–2	0–3	0–3	1–2	2–1	**4–11–0**

== Schedule and results ==
1988–89 regular season
October

Game	Result	Date	Score	Opponent	Record
1	W	October 6, 1988	5–2	@ Hartford Whalers (1988–89)	1–0–0
2	L	October 8, 1988	3–5	New Jersey Devils (1988–89)	1–1–0
3	W	October 9, 1988	4–1	Minnesota North Stars (1988–89)	2–1–0
4	W	October 12, 1988	6–5	@ Montreal Canadiens (1988–89)	3–1–0
5	L	October 14, 1988	4–5	Buffalo Sabres (1988–89)	3–2–0
6	W	October 16, 1988	5–3	@ Buffalo Sabres (1988–89)	4–2–0
7	L	October 20, 1988	2–5	@ Philadelphia Flyers (1988–89)	4–3–0
8	L	October 22, 1988	3–7	@ New York Islanders (1988–89)	4–4–0
9	L	October 23, 1988	2–8	@ New York Rangers (1988–89)	4–5–0
10	L	October 25, 1988	4–7	Chicago Blackhawks (1988–89)	4–6–0
11	L	October 27, 1988	2–6	@ Boston Bruins (1988–89)	4–7–0
12	W	October 29, 1988	3–2 OT	New York Islanders (1988–89)	5–7–0

November

Game	Result	Date	Score	Opponent	Record
13	L	November 1, 1988	1–3	Los Angeles Kings (1988–89)	5–8–0
14	W	November 3, 1988	6–2	@ Pittsburgh Penguins (1988–89)	6–8–0
15	L	November 5, 1988	2–5	St. Louis Blues (1988–89)	6–9–0
16	L	November 8, 1988	4–8	Winnipeg Jets (1988–89)	6–10–0
17	L	November 10, 1988	1–4	@ Washington Capitals (1988–89)	6–11–0
18	L	November 12, 1988	3–4	@ St. Louis Blues (1988–89)	6–12–0
19	T	November 13, 1988	5–5 OT	@ Chicago Blackhawks (1988–89)	6–12–1
20	T	November 15, 1988	5–5 OT	Boston Bruins (1988–89)	6–12–2
21	W	November 19, 1988	6–5	Philadelphia Flyers (1988–89)	7–12–2
22	L	November 23, 1988	3–4	@ Hartford Whalers (1988–89)	7–13–2
23	W	November 24, 1988	5–3	Montreal Canadiens (1988–89)	8–13–2
24	L	November 26, 1988	2–4	Hartford Whalers (1988–89)	8–14–2
25	L	November 28, 1988	4–7	Edmonton Oilers (1988–89)	8–15–2
26	L	November 30, 1988	2–6	@ Buffalo Sabres (1988–89)	8–16–2

December

Game	Result	Date	Score	Opponent	Record
27	L	December 1, 1988	3–7	@ Detroit Red Wings (1988–89)	8–17–2
28	W	December 3, 1988	6–4	Detroit Red Wings (1988–89)	9–17–2
29	L	December 6, 1988	2–3	@ Calgary Flames (1988–89)	9–18–2
30	L	December 7, 1988	3–8	@ Edmonton Oilers (1988–89)	9–19–2
31	W	December 9, 1988	4–2	@ Vancouver Canucks (1988–89)	10–19–2
32	L	December 13, 1988	1–4	Washington Capitals (1988–89)	10–20–2
33	W	December 15, 1988	6–4	Montreal Canadiens (1988–89)	11–20–2
34	T	December 17, 1988	2–2 OT	@ Boston Bruins (1988–89)	11–20–3
35	W	December 18, 1988	4–2	Boston Bruins (1988–89)	12–20–3
36	L	December 21, 1988	4–6	@ Montreal Canadiens (1988–89)	12–21–3
37	W	December 23, 1988	5–4	@ Winnipeg Jets (1988–89)	13–21–3
38	T	December 28, 1988	4–4 OT	Hartford Whalers (1988–89)	13–21–4
39	L	December 29, 1988	5–6	Toronto Maple Leafs (1988–89)	13–22–4
40	L	December 31, 1988	1–6	@ Toronto Maple Leafs (1988–89)	13–23–4

January

Game	Result	Date	Score	Opponent	Record
41	L	January 3, 1989	1–5	@ Calgary Flames (1988–89)	13–24–4
42	L	January 4, 1989	2–4	@ Edmonton Oilers (1988–89)	13–25–4
43	L	January 8, 1989	2–4	Boston Bruins (1988–89)	13–26–4
44	T	January 10, 1989	4–4 OT	Washington Capitals (1988–89)	13–26–5
45	L	January 12, 1989	2–7	@ Philadelphia Flyers (1988–89)	13–27–5
46	T	January 14, 1989	1–1 OT	Buffalo Sabres (1988–89)	13–27–6
47	W	January 17, 1989	7–4	New Jersey Devils (1988–89)	14–27–6
48	W	January 19, 1989	5–4	@ New Jersey Devils (1988–89)	15–27–6
49	W	January 21, 1989	4–3	Calgary Flames (1988–89)	16–27–6
50	L	January 23, 1989	0–5	Hartford Whalers (1988–89)	16–28–6
51	L	January 26, 1989	3–5	@ Minnesota North Stars (1988–89)	16–29–6
52	W	January 28, 1989	3–2 OT	@ Hartford Whalers (1988–89)	17–29–6
53	W	January 30, 1989	4–3	@ Detroit Red Wings (1988–89)	18–29–6

February

Game	Result	Date	Score	Opponent	Record
54	L	February 2, 1989	1–6	Montreal Canadiens (1988–89)	18–30–6
55	W	February 4, 1989	6–3	Minnesota North Stars (1988–89)	19–30–6
56	L	February 5, 1989	2–3	New York Islanders (1988–89)	19–31–6
57	L	February 9, 1989	2–5	@ Pittsburgh Penguins (1988–89)	19–32–6
58	W	February 11, 1989	8–1	Pittsburgh Penguins (1988–89)	20–32–6
59	W	February 13, 1989	3–2	@ Montreal Canadiens (1988–89)	21–32–6
60	L	February 16, 1989	2–3	@ Vancouver Canucks (1988–89)	21–33–6
61	L	February 18, 1989	3–11	@ Los Angeles Kings (1988–89)	21–34–6
62	W	February 21, 1989	4–3	Winnipeg Jets (1988–89)	22–34–6
63	L	February 23, 1989	2–4	@ Hartford Whalers (1988–89)	22–35–6
64	L	February 25, 1989	2–7	New York Rangers (1988–89)	22–36–6
65	L	February 28, 1989	2–3	Vancouver Canucks (1988–89)	22–37–6

March

Game	Result	Date	Score	Opponent	Record
66	L	March 2, 1989	2–5	@ Boston Bruins (1988–89)	22–38–6
67	W	March 4, 1989	6–2	Buffalo Sabres (1988–89)	23–38–6
68	W	March 5, 1989	8–2	@ Buffalo Sabres (1988–89)	24–38–6
69	L	March 7, 1989	4–6	Toronto Maple Leafs (1988–89)	24–39–6
70	L	March 9, 1989	2–5	Montreal Canadiens (1988–89)	24–40–6
71	L	March 14, 1989	0–4	Los Angeles Kings (1988–89)	24–41–6
72	T	March 16, 1989	2–2 OT	@ Boston Bruins (1988–89)	24–41–7
73	W	March 18, 1989	8–3	New York Rangers (1988–89)	25–41–7
74	L	March 22, 1989	0–8	@ Montreal Canadiens (1988–89)	25–42–7
75	W	March 23, 1989	6–3	Hartford Whalers (1988–89)	26–42–7
76	W	March 25, 1989	4–1	Buffalo Sabres (1988–89)	27–42–7
77	L	March 29, 1989	1–3	@ Chicago Blackhawks (1988–89)	27–43–7
78	L	March 30, 1989	3–4 OT	@ St. Louis Blues (1988–89)	27–44–7

April

Game	Result	Date	Score	Opponent	Record
79	L	April 1, 1989	4–5	Boston Bruins (1988–89)	27–45–7
80	L	April 2, 1989	2–4	@ Buffalo Sabres (1988–89)	27–46–7

Legend: Win (2 points) Loss (0 points) Tie (1 point)

== Player statistics ==
=== Forwards ===
Player	GP	G	AST	PTS	PIM
Peter Stastny	72	35	50	85	117
Walt Poddubny	72	38	37	75	107
Michel Goulet	69	26	38	64	67
Joe Sakic	70	23	39	62	24
Iiro Jarvi	75	11	30	41	40
Paul Gillis	79	15	25	40	163
Marc Fortier	57	20	19	39	45
Anton Stastny	55	7	30	37	12
Gaetan Duchesne	70	8	21	29	56
Mike Hough	46	9	10	19	39
Ken McRae	37	6	11	17	68
David Latta	24	4	8	12	4
Jeff Jackson	33	4	6	10	28
Alain Cote	55	2	8	10	14
Trevor Stienburg	55	6	3	9	125
Mark Vermette	12	0	4	4	7
Lane Lambert	13	2	2	4	23
Darin Kimble	26	3	1	4	149
Dean Hopkins	5	0	2	2	4
Jacques Mailhot	5	0	0	0	33
Joel Baillargeon	5	0	0	0	4

=== Defencemen ===
Player	GP	G	AST	PTS	PIM
Jeff Brown	78	21	47	68	62
Randy Moller	74	7	22	29	136
Robert Picard	74	7	14	21	61
Curtis Leschyshyn	71	4	9	13	71
Mario Marois	42	2	11	13	101
Steven Finn	77	2	6	8	235
Tommy Albelin	14	2	4	6	27
Gord Donnelly	16	4	0	4	46
Jari Gronstrand	25	1	3	4	14
Bobby Dollas	16	0	3	3	16
Greg Smyth	10	0	1	1	70
Scott Shaunessy	4	0	0	0	16

=== Goaltending ===
Player	GP	W	L	T	SO	GAA
Mario Gosselin	39	11	19	3	0	4.24
Ron Tugnutt	26	10	10	3	0	3.60
Bob Mason	22	5	14	1	0	4.73
Mario Brunetta	5	1	3	0	0	5.04

Note:

Pos = Position;GP = Games played; G = Goals; A = Assists; Pts = Points; PIM = Penalty minutes; +/- = Plus/minus; PPG = Power-play goals; SHG = Short-handed goals; GWG = Game-winning goals
Pos = Position;GP = Games played; Min, TOI = Minutes played; W = Wins; L = Losses; T,T/OT = Ties; OTL = Overtime losses; GA = Goals-against; GAA = Goals-against average; SO = Shutouts; SA = Shots against; SV = Shots saved;SV% = Save percentage;

== Transactions ==
The Nordiques were involved in the following transactions during the 1988–89 season.

=== Trades ===
July 5, 1988	To Chicago Blackhawks Mike Eagles	To Quebec Nordiques Bob Mason
July 25, 1988	To Philadelphia Flyers Terry Carkner	To Quebec Nordiques Greg Smyth; 3rd round pick in 1989—John Tanner
July 29, 1988	To Winnipeg Jets Future considerations	To Quebec Nordiques Joel Baillargeon
August 1, 1988	To New York Rangers Normand Rochefort; Jason Lafreniere	To Quebec Nordiques Bruce Bell; Jari Gronstrand; Walt Poddubny; 4th round pick in 1989—Eric Dubois
December 6, 1988	To Winnipeg Jets Gord Donnelly	To Quebec Nordiques Mario Marois
December 12, 1988	To New Jersey Devils Tommy Albelin	To Quebec Nordiques 4th round pick in 1989—Niklas Andersson
December 15, 1988	To Minnesota North Stars Future Considerations	To Quebec Nordiques Stephane Roy
June 17, 1989	To Washington Capitals Bob Mason	To Quebec Nordiques Future Considerations
June 17, 1989	To New Jersey Devils Walt Poddubny; 4th round pick in 1990—Mike Bodnarchuk	To Quebec Nordiques Joe Cirella; Claude Loiselle; 8th round pick in 1990—Alexander Karpovtsev

=== Waivers ===
December 20, 1988	To Detroit Red Wings Bruce Bell

=== Free agents ===
Player	Former team
Brent Severyn	University of Alberta Golden Bears (CWUAA)
Dean Hopkins	Edmonton Oilers
Jacques Mailhot	Fredericton Express (AHL)

== Draft picks ==
Quebec's draft picks from the 1988 NHL entry draft, which was held at the Montreal Forum in Montreal.

Round	#	Player	Nationality	College/junior/club team (league)
1	3	Curtis Leschyshyn	Canada	Saskatoon Blades (WHL)
1	5	Daniel Dore	Canada	Drummondville Voltigeurs (QMJHL)
2	24	Stephane Fiset	Canada	Victoriaville Tigres (QMJHL)
3	45	Petri Aaltonen	Finland	HIFK (Finland)
4	66	Darin Kimble	Canada	Prince Albert Raiders (WHL)
5	87	Stephane Venne	Canada	Vermont Catamounts (NCAA)
6	108	Ed Ward	Canada	Northern Michigan Wildcats (NCAA)
7	129	Valeri Kamensky	Soviet Union	CSKA Moscow (Soviet Union)
8	150	Sakari Lindfors	Finland	HIFK (Finland)
9	171	Dan Wiebe	Canada	Alberta Golden Bears (CWUAA)
11	213	Alexei Gusarov	Soviet Union	CSKA Moscow (Soviet Union)
12	234	Claude Lapointe	Canada	Laval Titan (QMJHL)
S	3	Phil Berger	United States	Northern Michigan University (CCHA)
S	8	Jamie Baker	Canada	Saint Lawrence University (ECAC)

== Farm teams ==
- Fredericton Express—AHL
