= 1988–89 Vancouver Canucks season =

19th season in franchise history

1988–89 Vancouver Canucks
- Division: 4th Smythe
- Conference: 7th Campbell
- 1988–89 record: 33–39–8
- Home record: 19–15–6
- Road record: 14–24–2
- Goals for: 251
- Goals against: 253

Team information
- General manager: Pat Quinn
- Coach: Bob McCammon
- Captain: Stan Smyl
- Alternate captains: Paul Reinhart; Garth Butcher; Rich Sutter
- Arena: Pacific Coliseum
- Average attendance: 13,779

Team leaders
- Goals: Trevor Linden and Petri Skriko (30)
- Assists: Paul Reinhart (50)
- Points: Petri Skriko (66)
- Penalty minutes: Garth Butcher (227)
- Wins: Kirk McLean (20)
- Goals against average: Troy Gamble (2.38)

The 1988–89 Vancouver Canucks season saw the Canucks finish in fourth place in the Smythe Division with a record of 33 wins, 39 losses, and 8 ties for 74 points. They met the first-place Calgary Flames in the Division Semifinals and extended the series to a decisive seventh game. However, the Flames won the game and the series with Joel Otto's overtime goal, clinching the Stanley Cup championship.

== Off-season ==
In June 1988, Nelson Skalbania attempted to broker a deal with his friend, Edmonton Oilers owner Peter Pocklington to acquire Wayne Gretzky for the Canucks. Skalbania was also in talks with Gretzky's agent Mike Barnett. Pat Quinn played a pivotal role in shaping the future of the Vancouver Canucks by selecting Trevor Linden with the second overall pick in the NHL Entry Draft. His strategic approach to team building, which had started with key transactions during the previous offseason, continued as he sought to strengthen the Canucks through further trades and acquisitions. The Canucks only had to part with a third-round pick in 1989 (Veli-Pekka Kautonen) to sign the veterans Paul Reinhart and Steve Bozek from Calgary on September 6. The following day, defenseman Robert Nordmark and a 1989 second-round pick (Craig Darby) were traded from St. Louis in exchange for Dave Richter. The Canucks would have their power-play point men for the coming season in order, and gave up hardly anything to get them. The free-agent signing of Harold Snepsts returned a familiar face to the Canucks blueline, and suddenly defence seemed to be a strength of the Canucks. Combined with solid netminding from Kirk McLean and Steve Weeks, only powerhouses Montreal and Calgary would surrender fewer goals than the Canucks that season. With Garth Butcher, Rich Sutter, Stan Smyl, Jim Sandlak, Ronnie Stern, Darryl Stanley, and Snepsts in the line-up, Vancouver was suddenly a not-so-pleasant stop on a western road trip.

=== NHL draft ===
Round	Pick	Player	Nationality	College/Junior/Club team
1	2	Trevor Linden	Canada	Medicine Hat Tigers (WHL)
2	33	Leif Rohlin	Sweden	Västerås HK (Sweden)
3	44	Dane Jackson	United States	Vernon Vipers (BCJHL)
6	107	Corrie D'Alessio	Canada	Cornell University (ECAC)
6	122	Phil von Stefenelli	Canada	Boston University (Hockey East)
7	128	Dixon Ward	Canada	Red Deer Rustlers (AJHL)
8	149	Greg Geldart	Canada	St. Albert Saints (AJHL)
9	170	Roger Akerstrom	Sweden	Luleå HF (Sweden)
10	191	Paul Constantin	Canada	Burlington Cougars (CJBHL)
11	212	Chris Wolanin	United States	University of Illinois at Chicago (CCHA)
12	233	Stefan Nilsson	Sweden	Troja (Sweden)
S	2	Andy Gribble	Canada	Bowling Green State University (CCHA)
S	7	Steve McKichan	Canada	Miami University (CCHA)

== Regular season ==
The Canucks went 6-1-1 in the pre-season and on an early-season visit to Edmonton ended a three-year, 27-game winless streak against the Oilers with a 6–2 victory. Though they would only lose by more than three goals once all season, goal production was a problem. Both Tony Tanti (47 points) and Stan Smyl (25) had big drop-offs in production and, by association, so did Greg D. Adams (33) and Barry Pederson (41). The scoring slack was picked up by Petri Skriko (66 points), Linden (59), and by Reinhart (57) and Nordmark (41). Even with that, however, by mid-season the Canucks were only producing results that were marginally better than the previous few seasons and only remained in the playoff race due to an unexpectedly poor season by Winnipeg. A club-record seven-game winning streak in February changed the team's outlook. Jim Sandlak was the hero in the seventh win, a tight-checking game against Toronto that was played in front of a packed house and a national television audience. His rebound goal with 18 seconds to play in overtime off of a Snepsts point shot after an offensive-zone face-off win by Linden sent the home crowd into a frenzy. People around the league were now taking notice. Don Cherry hopped on the Canucks bandwagon and on Coach's Corner wore a button declaring "I vote Trevor Linden NHL Rookie-of-the-Year 1989". Those buttons became a common site around town that spring. In the game following the seventh win, the Canucks lost 3–2 in Montreal to end the streak, but Linden scored twice to tie and pass Ivan Hlinka's club record for rookie goal scoring. He finished with 30—tied with Skriko for the team lead. These new heroes would continue to delight the Coliseum faithful, as they racked up a 12-game home unbeaten streak (11–0–1). The Canucks secured a playoff spot on March 23 and threatened to overtake Edmonton for third place in the Smythe before tapering off in the last couple of weeks. The 74 points would earn them a playoff date against the NHL's number one team in the regular season, the Calgary Flames.

Despite finishing last in scoring, with just 251 goals scored, the Canucks had a solid defensive corps, finishing 3rd in fewest goals allowed (253).

=== Season standings ===
Smythe Division
	GP	W	L	T	GF	GA	Pts
**Calgary Flames**	80	54	17	9	354	226	117
**Los Angeles Kings**	80	42	31	7	376	335	91
**Edmonton Oilers**	80	38	34	8	325	306	84
**Vancouver Canucks**	80	33	39	8	251	253	74
Winnipeg Jets	80	26	42	12	300	355	64

Note: GP = Games played, W = Wins, L = Losses, T = Ties, Pts = Points, GF = Goals for, GA = Goals against
Note: Teams that qualified for the playoffs are highlighted in bold.

=== Record vs. opponents ===
==== Vs. Campbell Conference ====
**Vs. Smythe Division**

1988–89 NHL records
Team	**CGY**	**EDM**	**LAK**	**VAN**	**WIN**	**Total**
Calgary	—	5–2–1	6–2	5–1–2	5–2–1	**21–8–4**
Edmonton	2–5–1	—	4–4	3–5	4–3–1	**13–17–2**
Los Angeles	2–6	4–4	—	4–4	2–2–4	**12–16–4**
Vancouver	1–5–2	5–3	4–4	—	3–4–1	**13–16–3**
Winnipeg	2–5–1	3–4–1	2–2–4	4–3–1	—	**11–14–7**

**Vs. Norris Division**

1988–89 NHL records
Team	**CHI**	**DET**	**MIN**	**STL**	**TOR**	**Total**
Calgary	3–0	3–0	2–0–1	3–0	0–1–2	**11–1–3**
Edmonton	0–2–1	1–2	1–0–2	3–0	3–0	**8–4–3**
Los Angeles	3–0	3–0	2–1	1–2	3–0	**12–3–0**
Vancouver	2–1	0–0–3	1–2	3–0	1–2	**7–5–3**
Winnipeg	0–3	0–2–1	1–2	1–1–1	3–0	**5–8–2**

Vs. Wales Conference

**Vs. Adams Division**

1988–89 NHL records
Team	**BOS**	**BUF**	**HFD**	**MTL**	**QUE**	**Total**
Calgary	2–1	1–2	2–1	1–2	2–1	**8–7–0**
Edmonton	0–3	2–0–1	2–1	1–2	3–0	**8–6–1**
Los Angeles	1–2	3–0	2–1	0–3	3–0	**9–6–0**
Vancouver	1–2	2–1	1–1–1	0–3	2–1	**6–8–1**
Winnipeg	1–2	1–2	1–2	1–2	1–2	**5–10–0**

**Vs. Patrick Division**

1988–89 NHL records
Team	**NJD**	**NYI**	**NYR**	**PHI**	**PIT**	**WSH**	**Total**
Calgary	3–0	2–0–1	2–1	3–0	2–1	2–0–1	**14–2–2**
Edmonton	1–2	2–1	2–1	1–0–2	2–1	1–2	**9–7–2**
Los Angeles	1–0–2	2–1	1–2	2–1	2–1	1–1–1	**9–6–3**
Vancouver	1–1–1	1–2	0–3	3–0	1–2	1–2	**7–10–1**
Winnipeg	1–0–2	1–2	1–2	0–2–1	1–2	1–2	**5–10–3**

== Schedule and results ==
1988–89 regular season
October

Game	Result	Date	Score	Opponent	Record
1	T	October 6, 1988	2–2 OT	Winnipeg Jets (1988–89)	0–0–1
2	T	October 8, 1988	3–3 OT	Detroit Red Wings (1988–89)	0–0–2
3	L	October 10, 1988	2–3	New York Islanders (1988–89)	0–1–2
4	W	October 12, 1988	6–2	@ Edmonton Oilers (1988–89)	1–1–2
5	L	October 14, 1988	3–4 OT	@ Winnipeg Jets (1988–89)	1–2–2
6	L	October 16, 1988	2–3	@ New York Rangers (1988–89)	1–3–2
7	L	October 18, 1988	2–3	@ New York Islanders (1988–89)	1–4–2
8	W	October 19, 1988	4–0	@ New Jersey Devils (1988–89)	2–4–2
9	W	October 23, 1988	6–5	Edmonton Oilers (1988–89)	3–4–2
10	L	October 25, 1988	3–4 OT	Washington Capitals (1988–89)	3–5–2
11	W	October 28, 1988	5–2	Chicago Blackhawks (1988–89)	4–5–2
12	W	October 30, 1988	2–1	Calgary Flames (1988–89)	5–5–2

November

Game	Result	Date	Score	Opponent	Record
13	L	November 1, 1988	3–5	@ Pittsburgh Penguins (1988–89)	5–6–2
14	W	November 3, 1988	5–2	@ Philadelphia Flyers (1988–89)	6–6–2
15	W	November 5, 1988	3–2 OT	@ Hartford Whalers (1988–89)	7–6–2
16	L	November 6, 1988	2–4	@ Boston Bruins (1988–89)	7–7–2
17	T	November 9, 1988	1–1 OT	Hartford Whalers (1988–89)	7–7–3
18	L	November 11, 1988	1–3	Montreal Canadiens (1988–89)	7–8–3
19	L	November 13, 1988	2–4	Pittsburgh Penguins (1988–89)	7–9–3
20	L	November 15, 1988	4–6	@ Los Angeles Kings (1988–89)	7–10–3
21	L	November 17, 1988	6–7	@ Minnesota North Stars (1988–89)	7–11–3
22	W	November 19, 1988	3–2	@ St. Louis Blues (1988–89)	8–11–3
23	W	November 20, 1988	7–4	@ Chicago Blackhawks (1988–89)	9–11–3
24	W	November 22, 1988	4–2	Buffalo Sabres (1988–89)	10–11–3
25	T	November 25, 1988	2–2 OT	New Jersey Devils (1988–89)	10–11–4
26	W	November 27, 1988	5–2	Los Angeles Kings (1988–89)	11–11–4
27	T	November 29, 1988	3–3 OT	@ Calgary Flames (1988–89)	11–11–5
28	L	November 30, 1988	2–4	@ Edmonton Oilers (1988–89)	11–12–5

December

Game	Result	Date	Score	Opponent	Record
29	L	December 2, 1988	3–6	@ Winnipeg Jets (1988–89)	11–13–5
30	L	December 6, 1988	3–5	New York Rangers (1988–89)	11–14–5
31	L	December 9, 1988	2–4	Quebec Nordiques (1988–89)	11–15–5
32	W	December 11, 1988	8–6	Winnipeg Jets (1988–89)	12–15–5
33	L	December 15, 1988	0–2	@ Calgary Flames (1988–89)	12–16–5
34	L	December 16, 1988	3–5	Calgary Flames (1988–89)	12–17–5
35	W	December 19, 1988	5–1	Minnesota North Stars (1988–89)	13–17–5
36	W	December 21, 1988	2–1	@ Edmonton Oilers (1988–89)	14–17–5
37	L	December 23, 1988	2–5	Los Angeles Kings (1988–89)	14–18–5
38	L	December 26, 1988	2–3 OT	Calgary Flames (1988–89)	14–19–5
39	W	December 29, 1988	6–3	@ Los Angeles Kings (1988–89)	15–19–5

January

Game	Result	Date	Score	Opponent	Record
40	L	January 1, 1989	0–4	Montreal Canadiens (1988–89)	15–20–5
41	L	January 4, 1989	2–4	@ Winnipeg Jets (1988–89)	15–21–5
42	T	January 6, 1989	2–2 OT	@ Detroit Red Wings (1988–89)	15–21–6
43	W	January 7, 1989	7–5	@ Pittsburgh Penguins (1988–89)	16–21–6
44	L	January 9, 1989	0–3	@ Toronto Maple Leafs (1988–89)	16–22–6
45	L	January 13, 1989	1–3	Winnipeg Jets (1988–89)	16–23–6
46	W	January 15, 1989	2–1	St. Louis Blues (1988–89)	17–23–6
47	W	January 17, 1989	5–3	Philadelphia Flyers (1988–89)	18–23–6
48	L	January 21, 1989	4–5 OT	New York Rangers (1988–89)	18–24–6
49	L	January 24, 1989	2–4	Chicago Blackhawks (1988–89)	18–25–6
50	W	January 26, 1989	6–2	@ Los Angeles Kings (1988–89)	19–25–6
51	T	January 29, 1989	4–4 OT	Calgary Flames (1988–89)	19–25–7
52	W	January 31, 1989	6–2	Edmonton Oilers (1988–89)	20–25–7

February

Game	Result	Date	Score	Opponent	Record
53	L	February 1, 1989	3–4	@ Edmonton Oilers (1988–89)	20–26–7
54	L	February 4, 1989	2–5	@ Calgary Flames (1988–89)	20–27–7
55	L	February 5, 1989	4–5	@ Calgary Flames (1988–89)	20–28–7
56	L	February 9, 1989	2–3	@ Minnesota North Stars (1988–89)	20–29–7
57	W	February 10, 1989	5–4	@ Buffalo Sabres (1988–89)	21–29–7
58	W	February 12, 1989	3–2	@ Philadelphia Flyers (1988–89)	22–29–7
59	W	February 14, 1989	5–2	Boston Bruins (1988–89)	23–29–7
60	W	February 16, 1989	3–2	Quebec Nordiques (1988–89)	24–29–7
61	W	February 19, 1989	3–2	Washington Capitals (1988–89)	25–29–7
62	W	February 21, 1989	2–0	St. Louis Blues (1988–89)	26–29–7
63	W	February 23, 1989	2–1 OT	Toronto Maple Leafs (1988–89)	27–29–7
64	L	February 26, 1989	2–5	@ Montreal Canadiens (1988–89)	27–30–7
65	W	February 28, 1989	3–2	@ Quebec Nordiques (1988–89)	28–30–7

March

Game	Result	Date	Score	Opponent	Record
66	L	March 2, 1989	1–2	@ Hartford Whalers (1988–89)	28–31–7
67	L	March 4, 1989	4–6	@ Boston Bruins (1988–89)	28–32–7
68	L	March 5, 1989	0–3	@ Washington Capitals (1988–89)	28–33–7
69	W	March 8, 1989	3–0	Winnipeg Jets (1988–89)	29–33–7
70	W	March 10, 1989	4–2	Los Angeles Kings (1988–89)	30–33–7
71	T	March 14, 1989	2–2 OT	Detroit Red Wings (1988–89)	30–33–8
72	W	March 16, 1989	3–0	Edmonton Oilers (1988–89)	31–33–8
73	W	March 18, 1989	2–1	New York Islanders (1988–89)	32–33–8
74	L	March 20, 1989	1–3	@ New Jersey Devils (1988–89)	32–34–8
75	L	March 22, 1989	3–5	@ Toronto Maple Leafs (1988–89)	32–35–8
76	L	March 24, 1989	2–5	@ Buffalo Sabres (1988–89)	32–36–8
77	W	March 26, 1989	7–3	@ Winnipeg Jets (1988–89)	33–36–8
78	L	March 29, 1989	2–5	Edmonton Oilers (1988–89)	33–37–8

April

Game	Result	Date	Score	Opponent	Record
79	L	April 1, 1989	4–6	@ Los Angeles Kings (1988–89)	33–38–8
80	L	April 2, 1989	4–5	Los Angeles Kings (1988–89)	33–39–8

Legend: Win (2 points) Loss (0 points) Tie (1 point)

== Player statistics ==
=== Forwards ===
Note: GP= Games played; G= Goals; AST= Assists; PTS = Points; PIM = Points

Player	GP	G	AST	PTS	PIM
Petri Skriko	74	30	36	66	57
Trevor Linden	80	30	29	59	41
Tony Tanti	77	24	25	49	69
Brian Bradley	71	18	27	45	42
Barry Pederson	62	15	26	41	22
Jim Sandlak	72	20	20	40	99
Steve Bozek	71	17	18	35	64
Greg D. Adams	61	19	14	33	24
Rich Sutter	75	17	15	32	122
Stan Smyl	75	7	18	25	102
Dan Hodgson	23	4	13	17	25
David Bruce	53	7	7	14	65
Mel Bridgman	15	4	3	7	10
Doug Smith	10	3	4	7	4
Greg C. Adams	12	4	2	6	35
Ken Berry	13	2	1	3	5
José Charbonneau	13	0	1	1	6
Rob Murphy	8	0	1	1	2
Ron Stern	17	1	0	1	49
Jay Mazur	1	0	0	0	0
Todd Hawkins	4	0	0	0	9
Jeff Rohlicek	2	0	0	0	4

=== Defencemen ===
Note: GP= Games played; G= Goals; AST= Assists; PTS = Points; PIM = Points

Player	GP	G	AST	PTS	PIM
Paul Reinhart	64	7	50	57	44
Robert Nordmark	80	6	35	41	97
Doug Lidster	63	5	17	22	78
Garth Butcher	78	0	20	20	227
Larry Melnyk	74	3	11	14	82
Jim Benning	65	3	9	12	48
Harold Snepsts	59	0	8	8	69
Daryl Stanley	20	3	1	4	14
Kevan Guy	45	2	2	4	34
Randy Boyd	2	0	1	1	0
Ian Kidd	1	0	0	0	0

=== Goaltending ===
Note: GP= Games played; W= Wins; L= Losses; T = Ties; SO = Shutouts; GAA = Goals Against

Player	GP	W	L	T	SO	GAA
Kirk McLean	42	20	17	3	4	3.08
Steve Weeks	35	11	19	5	0	2.98
Troy Gamble	5	2	3	0	0	2.38

== Playoffs ==
=== Smythe Division Semifinals ===
Jim Taylor of The province predicted that it would be the first best-of-seven series to be settled in three. The Flames were given 3:1 odds to win the Stanley Cup, while the long shot Canucks' odds were set at 100:1. In the first game, however, the Canucks managed to stay within a goal of the powerful Flames until Robert Nordmark tied the game on a third-period power-play. In the dying minutes, Harold Snepsts made a game-saving stop when Kirk McLean was caught out of position. At the 2:33 mark of the extra frame, ex-Flame Paul Reinhart exacted revenge on the team that was so quick to part with him by sending a wrist shot through traffic over Mike Vernon's left shoulder. To the surprise of many, the Canucks had won 4-3, winning the first game in the series. In the next two games, however, the Flames dominated the Canucks in all facets of the game, scoring 5-2 and 4-0 victories. It looked doubtful that the series would last longer than five games. But the Vancouver Canucks weren't going to roll over. The Flames started committing penalties, resulting in four power-play goals and a shocking 5–1 lead, which chased Vernon from the game. Trevor Linden, who would earn a reputation as a clutch playoff performer, had four points on the night, including his first ever playoff goal. The Flames scored two late goals to make it a 5–3 final, and the series was now even. But four games in five nights had taken its toll, and the overworked Canucks were no match for the depth of the Flames in Game Five. The Calgarians cruised to another 4–0 win, and looked to end the series two nights later. Trailing 1–0 in the second period, Linden brought the crowd to its feet when he split the defense and scored a beautiful goal to tie the score. The Flames regained the lead, but three goals in 2:18 late in the period, scored by Brian Bradley, Rich Sutter, and Garth Butcher (with his first goal all season), gave the Canucks a 4-2 lead heading into the final frame. The Flames did not want to go to a seventh game and demonstrated that in the third period. They got to within a goal and were pressing hard for the equalizer. The team defense of the Canucks was showing, though, as they were forcing most shots from the outside. With less than four minutes to play, a deflection off of two sticks caused two Flame skaters to be caught flat-footed. Brian Bradley, another ex-Flame, beat them both to the puck and found himself on a breakaway. He skated in on Vernon, faked to the forehand, deked to the backhand, and scored to give the Canucks a 5–3 lead. The deal was sealed with an empty-netter at 19:56 and the series was, incredibly, headed back to "CowTown" for a seventh game.

Surely Terry Crisp would not keep his job should the Flames lose this game. The Saddledome was eerily quiet as the game began, which was a stark contrast to the raucous Coliseum two nights earlier. Joe Nieuwendyk and Robert Nordmark traded power-play goals in the first thirteen minutes. With two minutes to play in the period, Al MacInnis' shot hit Gary Roberts in front and appeared to ring off the cross-bar. The goal judge turned the red light on, and referee Bill McCreary stopped play to check it out. After conferring at length with the goal judge and the linesmen, McCreary ruled it a goal. Replays showed his ruling was correct. Early in the second, with Rob Ramage off for high-sticking Rich Sutter, Trevor Linden unleashed a powerful shot that beat Vernon to tie the game. In the final minute of the middle stanza, Garth Butcher was sent off for high-sticking Gary Roberts (the two were at each other constantly in the series). Seconds later, Joe Mullen's shot toward the net hit the skate of Harold Snepsts and directed through McLean's legs to give the lead back to Calgary with a period to play. The Canucks were the dominant team in the third period, outshooting the Flames 13–10. At the 7:12 mark, Doug Lidster took a shot on goal as Tony Tanti skated across the goalmouth to screen Vernon. He bumped Vernon's arm as the puck hit Calgary defenseman Brad McCrimmon's skate and slid into the net. The goal stood, to the outrage of Vernon, and the game was tied. In the final minute of regulation time, a screened Vernon made a quick glove save off of Greg D. Adams to preserve the tie. In overtime, there were numerous chances for each team, especially the Canucks. On one chance, Petri Skriko appeared to have a lot of net to shoot at as Vernon was slow coming across, but he didn't get everything on his shot and Vernon managed to kick it out with his left skate. Stan Smyl had two chances. He beat Vernon on a wrap-around but hit the far post. Minutes later, the Flames were caught on a bad change and he had a breakaway, but Vernon was quick with the glove again. Then Vernon made yet another great glove save off the stick of Tony Tanti. The Flames had some chances of their own. Nordmark turned over the puck behind his net and Doug Gilmour fed Mullen alone in front. Mullen made a move to put McLean down and out, but they young netminder flung his goal-stick out in desperation and knocked the puck away at the goal line. On another occasion, the Flames did put the puck over the line, but the net had been dislodged an instant before. Finally, in the last minute of the first overtime period, the Flames rushed into the Vancouver zone. Jim Peplinski sent a casual shot toward the net that re-directed off the skate of Joel Otto and into the net. Only Otto knows for sure what his intentions were, and years later he claimed that he did not even see the shot coming. Perhaps he's right, as Doug Lidster was trying to clear him from the front of the net at the time. There was a lot of confusion, but the goal stood. The game was a classic. The Canucks were the only team to take the Stanley Cup Champion Flames to the brink of elimination that spring.

Date	Away	Score	Home	Score	Notes
April 5	Vancouver Canucks	4	Calgary Flames	3	(OT)
April 6	Vancouver Canucks	2	Calgary Flames	5	
April 8	Calgary Flames	4	Vancouver Canucks	0	
April 9	Calgary Flames	3	Vancouver Canucks	5	
April 11	Vancouver Canucks	0	Calgary Flames	4	
April 13	Calgary Flames	3	Vancouver Canucks	6	
April 15	Vancouver Canucks	3	Calgary Flames	4	(OT)

Calgary wins best-of-seven series 4 games to 3

== Awards and records ==
That summer, several Canucks were acknowledged for their performances during the season by becoming the first Canucks to be nominated for post-season awards. Though Trevor Linden (Calder Memorial Trophy), Kirk McLean (Vezina Trophy), Stan Smyl (Masterton Trophy), and coach Bob McCammon (Jack Adams Trophy) came away empty-handed, they, along with all of their teammates, had truly given the fans of Vancouver a series to remember.

- Trevor Linden, Runner-up, Calder Trophy
- Trevor Linden, NHL All-Rookie Team
- Trevor Linden, Voted The Hockey News Rookie-of-the-Year
- Trevor Linden, Molson Cup (Most game star selections for Vancouver Canucks)
- Trevor Linden, Cyclone Taylor Award (MVP of the Canucks)
- Trevor Linden, Most Exciting Player (Canucks team award)

== Transactions ==
=== Trades ===
September 6, 1988	To Calgary Flames 3rd round pick in 1989	To Vancouver Canucks Paul Reinhart; Steve Bozek
