= 1988–89 New Jersey Devils season =

National Hockey League season

1988–89 New Jersey Devils
- Division: 5th Patrick
- Conference: 9th Wales
- 1988–89 record: 27–41–12
- Home record: 17–18–5
- Road record: 10–23–7
- Goals for: 281
- Goals against: 325

Team information
- General manager: Lou Lamoriello
- Coach: Jim Schoenfeld
- Captain: Kirk Muller
- Alternate captains: Aaron Broten; Joe Cirella
- Arena: Brendan Byrne Arena

Team leaders
- Goals: John MacLean (42)
- Assists: Tom Kurvers (50)
- Points: John MacLean (87)
- Penalty minutes: Ken Daneyko (283)
- Plus/minus: John MacLean (+26)
- Wins: Sean Burke (22)
- Goals against average: Chris Terreri (2.69)

The 1988–89 New Jersey Devils season was the 15th season for the National Hockey League (NHL) franchise that was established on June 11, 1974, and seventh season since the franchise relocated from Colorado prior to the 1982–83 NHL season. After appearing in the playoffs the previous season, the Devils finished in fifth place in the Patrick Division to miss the playoffs for the thirteenth time in franchise history.

== Regular season ==
=== Season standings ===
Patrick Division
	GP	W	L	T	GF	GA	Pts
**Washington Capitals**	80	41	29	10	305	259	92
**Pittsburgh Penguins**	80	40	33	7	347	349	87
**New York Rangers**	80	37	35	8	310	307	82
**Philadelphia Flyers**	80	36	36	8	307	285	80
New Jersey Devils	80	27	41	12	281	325	66
New York Islanders	80	28	47	5	265	325	61

Note: GP = Games played, W = Wins, L = Losses, T = Ties, Pts = Points, GF = Goals for, GA = Goals against
Note: Teams that qualified for the playoffs are highlighted in bold.

=== Record vs. opponents ===
==== Vs. Wales Conference ====
**Vs. Patrick Division**

1988–89 NHL records
Team	**NJD**	**NYI**	**NYR**	**PHI**	**PIT**	**WSH**	**Total**
New Jersey	—	1–4–2	4–3	2–5	1–4–2	4–3	12–19–4
N.Y. Islanders	4–1–2	—	2–5	1–5–1	2–4–1	3–4	12–19–4
N.Y. Rangers	3–4	5–2	—	3–3–1	3–3–1	3–2–2	17–14–4
Philadelphia	5–2	5–1–1	3–3–1	—	3–4	3–4	19–14–2
Pittsburgh	4–1–2	4–2–1	3–3–1	4–3	—	4–3	19–12–4
Washington	3–4	4–3	2–3–2	4–3	3–4	—	16–17–2

**Vs. Adams Division**

1988–89 NHL records
Team	**BOS**	**BUF**	**HFD**	**MTL**	**QUE**	**Total**
New Jersey	0–2–1	1–2	1–2	0–3	1–2	3–11–1
N.Y. Islanders	1–2	0–3	1–2	2–1	2–1	6–9–0
N.Y. Rangers	0–1–2	0–3	1–2	0–3	2–1	3–10–2
Philadelphia	1–2	2–1	1–1–1	0–1–2	2–1	6–6–3
Pittsburgh	1–1–1	1–2	1–2	1–2	1–2	5–9–1
Washington	1–1–1	3–0	3–0	1–1–1	2–0–1	10–2–3

==== Vs. Campbell Conference ====
**Vs. Norris Division**

1988–89 NHL records
Team	**CHI**	**DET**	**MIN**	**STL**	**TOR**	**Total**
New Jersey	2–1	2–0–1	1–1–1	2–1	2–1	9–4–2
N.Y. Islanders	0–3	0–3	2–1	1–2	1–2	4–11–0
N.Y. Rangers	2–0–1	0–3	2–1	3–0	1–1–1	8–5–2
Philadelphia	3–0	1–2	2–1	0–3	2–1	8–7–0
Pittsburgh	3–0	2–0–1	1–2	1–1–1	2–1	9–4–2
Washington	2–1	1–1–1	1–1–1	2–0–1	2–1	8–4–3

**Vs. Smythe Division**

1988–89 NHL records
Team	**CGY**	**EDM**	**LAK**	**VAN**	**WIN**	**Total**
New Jersey	0–3	2–1	0–1–2	1–1–1	0–1–2	3–7–5
N.Y. Islanders	0–2–1	1–2	1–2	2–1	2–1	6–8–1
N.Y. Rangers	1–2	1–2	2–1	3–0	2–1	9–6–0
Philadelphia	0–3	0–1–2	1–2	0–3	2–0–1	3–9–3
Pittsburgh	1–2	1–2	1–2	2–1	2–1	7–8–0
Washington	0–2–1	2–1	1–1–1	2–1	2–1	7–6–2

== Schedule and results ==
1988–89 regular season
October

Game	Result	Date	Score	Opponent	Record
1	L	October 6, 1988	1–4	@ Philadelphia Flyers (season)	0–1–0
2	W	October 8, 1988	5–3	@ Quebec Nordiques (season)	1–1–0
3	W	October 10, 1988	5–0	@ New York Rangers (season)	2–1–0
4	L	October 14, 1988	3–7	Montreal Canadiens (season)	2–2–0
5	L	October 15, 1988	5–8	@ Washington Capitals (season)	2–3–0
6	L	October 19, 1988	0–4	Vancouver Canucks (season)	2–4–0
7	W	October 21, 1988	6–4	Pittsburgh Penguins (season)	3–4–0
8	T	October 23, 1988	3–3 OT	@ Detroit Red Wings (season)	3–4–1
9	L	October 25, 1988	4–7	Buffalo Sabres (season)	3–5–1
10	W	October 28, 1988	5–3	Hartford Whalers (season)	4–5–1
11	L	October 29, 1988	0–3	@ Hartford Whalers (season)	4–6–1

November

Game	Result	Date	Score	Opponent	Record
12	W	November 1, 1988	3–2	Philadelphia Flyers (season)	5–6–1
13	T	November 3, 1988	3–3 OT	Winnipeg Jets (season)	5–6–2
14	W	November 6, 1988	6–5	New York Rangers (season)	6–6–2
15	L	November 9, 1988	2–3 OT	Edmonton Oilers (season)	6–7–2
16	T	November 11, 1988	3–3 OT	New York Islanders (season)	6–7–3
17	W	November 12, 1988	6–3	@ Washington Capitals (season)	7–7–3
18	W	November 15, 1988	4–2	@ St. Louis Blues (season)	8–7–3
19	L	November 17, 1988	3–5	Calgary Flames (season)	8–8–3
20	L	November 19, 1988	2–3	Washington Capitals (season)	8–9–3
21	L	November 20, 1988	1–7	@ Philadelphia Flyers (season)	8–10–3
22	L	November 23, 1988	2–3	@ Calgary Flames (season)	8–11–3
23	T	November 25, 1988	2–2 OT	@ Vancouver Canucks (season)	8–11–4
24	L	November 29, 1988	3–9	@ Los Angeles Kings (season)	8–12–4

December

Game	Result	Date	Score	Opponent	Record
25	L	December 3, 1988	3–5	Philadelphia Flyers (season)	8–13–4
26	L	December 4, 1988	2–6	@ Philadelphia Flyers (season)	8–14–4
27	W	December 7, 1988	5–1	Washington Capitals (season)	9–14–4
28	W	December 9, 1988	6–5	New York Islanders (season)	10–14–4
29	T	December 10, 1988	4–4 OT	@ Pittsburgh Penguins (season)	10–14–5
30	W	December 13, 1988	4–3	St. Louis Blues (season)	11–14–5
31	W	December 15, 1988	6–3	Toronto Maple Leafs (season)	12–14–5
32	L	December 17, 1988	2–5	@ New York Islanders (season)	12–15–5
33	W	December 18, 1988	5–3	@ Chicago Blackhawks (season)	13–15–5
34	T	December 21, 1988	5–5 OT	@ Winnipeg Jets (season)	13–15–6
35	T	December 23, 1988	2–2 OT	Pittsburgh Penguins (season)	13–15–7
36	L	December 26, 1988	1–5	@ New York Rangers (season)	13–16–7
37	L	December 27, 1988	5–7	New York Rangers (season)	13–17–7
38	L	December 29, 1988	2–6	Boston Bruins (season)	13–18–7
39	L	December 31, 1988	6–8	@ Pittsburgh Penguins (season)	13–19–7

January

Game	Result	Date	Score	Opponent	Record
40	W	January 6, 1989	5–4	Buffalo Sabres (season)	14–19–7
41	W	January 7, 1989	5–2	Detroit Red Wings (season)	15–19–7
42	W	January 9, 1989	5–4	@ New York Rangers (season)	16–19–7
43	L	January 11, 1989	0–1	@ Montreal Canadiens (season)	16–20–7
44	L	January 13, 1989	3–5	New York Islanders (season)	16–21–7
45	W	January 15, 1989	1–0	Edmonton Oilers (season)	17–21–7
46	L	January 17, 1989	4–7	@ Quebec Nordiques (season)	17–22–7
47	L	January 19, 1989	4–5	Quebec Nordiques (season)	17–23–7
48	W	January 20, 1989	6–5 OT	@ Washington Capitals (season)	18–23–7
49	L	January 23, 1989	2–7	Minnesota North Stars (season)	18–24–7
50	T	January 24, 1989	2–2 OT	@ New York Islanders (season)	18–24–8
51	L	January 27, 1989	6–8	Hartford Whalers (season)	18–25–8
52	T	January 28, 1989	4–4 OT	@ Minnesota North Stars (season)	18–25–9

February

Game	Result	Date	Score	Opponent	Record
53	T	February 2, 1989	6–6 OT	@ Los Angeles Kings (season)	18–25–10
54	W	February 5, 1989	4–2	@ Edmonton Oilers (season)	19–25–10
55	W	February 9, 1989	6–3	@ Detroit Red Wings (season)	20–25–10
56	L	February 11, 1989	4–5	@ Montreal Canadiens (season)	20–26–10
57	W	February 13, 1989	8–1	Toronto Maple Leafs (season)	21–26–10
58	L	February 15, 1989	3–5	@ Buffalo Sabres (season)	21–27–10
59	L	February 17, 1989	2–3 OT	@ Winnipeg Jets (season)	21–28–10
60	L	February 18, 1989	3–5	@ Toronto Maple Leafs (season)	21–29–10
61	L	February 20, 1989	4–7	@ New York Rangers (season)	21–30–10
62	L	February 24, 1989	2–6	Philadelphia Flyers (season)	21–31–10
63	T	February 26, 1989	1–1 OT	Los Angeles Kings (season)	21–31–11
64	T	February 28, 1989	3–3 OT	Boston Bruins (season)	21–31–12

March

Game	Result	Date	Score	Opponent	Record
65	L	March 1, 1989	1–4	@ Pittsburgh Penguins (season)	21–32–12
66	W	March 3, 1989	6–3	New York Rangers (season)	22–32–12
67	W	March 5, 1989	2–0	Minnesota North Stars (season)	23–32–12
68	L	March 7, 1989	2–6	@ St. Louis Blues (season)	23–33–12
69	W	March 8, 1989	7–5	@ Chicago Blackhawks (season)	24–33–12
70	L	March 11, 1989	2–3 OT	@ New York Islanders (season)	24–34–12
71	L	March 14, 1989	1–5	Calgary Flames (season)	24–35–12
72	L	March 16, 1989	1–2	Pittsburgh Penguins (season)	24–36–12
73	L	March 18, 1989	1–3	Chicago Blackhawks (season)	24–37–12
74	W	March 20, 1989	3–1	Vancouver Canucks (season)	25–37–12
75	L	March 23, 1989	3–5	@ Boston Bruins (season)	25–38–12
76	L	March 25, 1989	4–5	@ Pittsburgh Penguins (season)	25–39–12
77	W	March 27, 1989	5–3	Philadelphia Flyers (season)	26–39–12
78	L	March 29, 1989	4–5 OT	New York Islanders (season)	26–40–12

April

Game	Result	Date	Score	Opponent	Record
79	L	April 1, 1989	4–6	@ Washington Capitals (season)	26–41–12
80	W	April 2, 1989	7–4	Washington Capitals (season)	27–41–12

Legend: Win (2 points) Loss (0 points) Tie (1 point)

== Playoffs ==
The 1988–89 season was a disappointing one for the Devils. Just a year after their cinderella 1987–88 campaign in which they fell one win short of reaching the Stanley Cup Finals, the team failed to make the playoffs altogether, managing only a fifth-place finish in the Patrick Division with a roster largely intact from the previous season.

== Player statistics ==
=== Forwards ===
Note: GP = Games played; G = Goals; A = Assists; Pts = Points; PIM = Penalties in minutes

Player	GP	G	A	Pts	PIM
John MacLean	74	42	45	87	122
Kirk Muller	80	31	43	74	119
Patrik Sundström	65	28	41	69	36
Aaron Broten	80	16	43	59	81
Brendan Shanahan	68	22	28	50	115
Pat Verbeek	77	26	21	47	189
Mark Johnson	40	13	25	38	24
Doug Brown	63	15	10	25	15
Claude Loiselle	74	7	14	21	209
Pat Conacher	55	7	5	12	14
Anders Carlsson	47	4	8	12	20
David Maley	68	5	6	11	249
Perry Anderson	39	3	6	9	128
Paul Ysebaert	5	0	4	4	0
Steve Rooney	25	3	1	4	79
Jon Morris	4	0	2	2	0
Alan Stewart	6	0	2	2	15
Chris Cichocki	2	0	1	1	2
Janne Ojanen	3	0	1	1	2
George McPhee	1	0	1	1	2
Kevin Todd	1	0	0	0	0

=== Defensemen ===
Note: GP = Games played; G = Goals; A = Assists; Pts = Points; PIM = Penalties in minutes

Player	GP	G	A	Pts	PIM
Tom Kurvers	74	16	50	66	38
Jim Korn	65	15	16	31	212
Tommy Albelin	46	7	24	31	40
Jack O'Callahan	36	5	21	26	51
Joe Cirella	80	3	19	22	155
Randy Velischek	80	4	14	18	70
Bruce Driver	27	1	15	16	24
Craig Wolanin	56	3	8	11	69
Ken Daneyko	80	5	5	10	283
Jamie Huscroft	15	0	2	2	51
Eric Weinrich	2	0	0	0	0
Corey Foster	2	0	0	0	0

=== Goaltending ===
Note: GP = Games played; W = Wins; L = Losses; T = Ties; SO = Shutouts; GAA = Goals against average

Player	GP	W	L	T	SO	GAA
Sean Burke	62	22	31	9	3	3.84
Bob Sauvé	15	4	5	1	0	4.67
Craig Billington	3	1	1	0	0	4.71
Chris Terreri	8	0	4	2	2.69	

== Draft picks ==
The Devils' draft picks at the 1988 NHL entry draft.

Rd #	Pick #	Player	Nat	Pos	Team (League)	Notes
1	12	Corey Foster	Canada	D	Peterborough Petes (OHL)	
2	23	Jeff Christian	Canada	LW	London Knights (OHL)	(Note: The Devils acquired 1988 second-round (Christian) and fourth-round (Ruchty) draft picks, along with Patrik Sundstrom, from Vancouver in exchange for the Devils' 1988 second-round draft pick (used on Leif Rohlin), Greg Adams and Kirk McLean on September 10, 1987.)
3	54	Zdeno Ciger	Czechoslovakia	LW	Martimex ZTS Martin HC (Czechoslovak Extraliga)	
4	65	Matt Ruchty	Canada	LW	Bowling Green State University (CCHA)	
4	75	Scott Luik	Canada	RW	Miami University (CCHA)	
5	96	Chris Nelson	United States	D	Rochester Jr. Americans (MJHL)	
6	117	Chad Johnson	United States	C	Rochester Jr. Americans (MJHL)	
7	138	Chad Erickson	United States	G	Warroad H.S. (Minnesota)	
8	159	Bryan LaFort	United States	G	Waltham H.S. (Massachusetts)	
9	180	Sergei Svetlov	Soviet Union	RW	Moscow Dynamo (Soviet League)	
10	201	Bob Woods	Canada	D	Brandon Wheat Kings (WHL)	
10	207	Alexander Semak	Soviet Union	C	Moscow Dynamo (Soviet League)	(Note: The Devils acquired the 1988 tenth-round draft pick from Boston for Steve Tsujiura on March 8, 1988.)
11	222	Chuck Hughes	United States	G	Catholic Memorial H.S. (Massachusetts)	
12	243	Michael Pohl	West Germany	F	SB Rosenheim (DEL)	
S	17	Tim Budy	Canada	LW	Colorado College (WCHA)	

== See also ==
- 1988–89 NHL season
