= 1988–89 Washington Capitals season =

NHL hockey team season

1988–89 Washington Capitals
- Patrick Division champions
- Division: 1st Patrick
- Conference: 2nd Wales
- 1988–89 record: 41–29–10
- Home record: 25–12–3
- Road record: 16–17–7
- Goals for: 305
- Goals against: 259

Team information
- General manager: David Poile
- Coach: Bryan Murray
- Captain: Rod Langway
- Arena: Capital Centre

Team leaders
- Goals: Geoff Courtnall (42)
- Assists: Scott Stevens (61)
- Points: Mike Ridley (89)
- Penalty minutes: Scott Stevens (225)
- Plus/minus: Kevin Hatcher (+19)
- Wins: Pete Peeters (20)
- Goals against average: Pete Peeters (2.85)

The 1988–89 Washington Capitals season saw the team became the first team other than the Philadelphia Flyers or the New York Islanders to finish in first place in the Patrick Division with a 41–29–10 record for 92 points. However, they lost their first-round playoff match-up to the Philadelphia Flyers, four games to two. This was the first time the Capitals won their division in the regular season and did not do so again until 2000.

== Regular season ==
The Capitals tied the St. Louis Blues for most shutouts in the league, with 6.

=== Final standings ===
Patrick Division
	GP	W	L	T	GF	GA	Pts
**Washington Capitals**	80	41	29	10	305	259	92
**Pittsburgh Penguins**	80	40	33	7	347	349	87
**New York Rangers**	80	37	35	8	310	307	82
**Philadelphia Flyers**	80	36	36	8	307	285	80
New Jersey Devils	80	27	41	12	281	325	66
New York Islanders	80	28	47	5	265	325	61

Note: GP = Games played, W = Wins, L = Losses, T = Ties, Pts = Points, GF = Goals for, GA = Goals against
Note: Teams that qualified for the playoffs are highlighted in bold.

=== Record vs. opponents ===
==== Vs. Wales Conference ====
**Vs. Patrick Division**

1988–89 NHL records
Team	**NJD**	**NYI**	**NYR**	**PHI**	**PIT**	**WSH**	**Total**
New Jersey	—	1–4–2	4–3	2–5	1–4–2	4–3	12–19–4
N.Y. Islanders	4–1–2	—	2–5	1–5–1	2–4–1	3–4	12–19–4
N.Y. Rangers	3–4	5–2	—	3–3–1	3–3–1	3–2–2	17–14–4
Philadelphia	5–2	5–1–1	3–3–1	—	3–4	3–4	19–14–2
Pittsburgh	4–1–2	4–2–1	3–3–1	4–3	—	4–3	19–12–4
Washington	3–4	4–3	2–3–2	4–3	3–4	—	16–17–2

**Vs. Adams Division**

1988–89 NHL records
Team	**BOS**	**BUF**	**HFD**	**MTL**	**QUE**	**Total**
New Jersey	0–2–1	1–2	1–2	0–3	1–2	3–11–1
N.Y. Islanders	1–2	0–3	1–2	2–1	2–1	6–9–0
N.Y. Rangers	0–1–2	0–3	1–2	0–3	2–1	3–10–2
Philadelphia	1–2	2–1	1–1–1	0–1–2	2–1	6–6–3
Pittsburgh	1–1–1	1–2	1–2	1–2	1–2	5–9–1
Washington	1–1–1	3–0	3–0	1–1–1	2–0–1	10–2–3

==== Vs. Campbell Conference ====
**Vs. Norris Division**

1988–89 NHL records
Team	**CHI**	**DET**	**MIN**	**STL**	**TOR**	**Total**
New Jersey	2–1	2–0–1	1–1–1	2–1	2–1	9–4–2
N.Y. Islanders	0–3	0–3	2–1	1–2	1–2	4–11–0
N.Y. Rangers	2–0–1	0–3	2–1	3–0	1–1–1	8–5–2
Philadelphia	3–0	1–2	2–1	0–3	2–1	8–7–0
Pittsburgh	3–0	2–0–1	1–2	1–1–1	2–1	9–4–2
Washington	2–1	1–1–1	1–1–1	2–0–1	2–1	8–4–3

**Vs. Smythe Division**

1988–89 NHL records
Team	**CGY**	**EDM**	**LAK**	**VAN**	**WIN**	**Total**
New Jersey	0–3	2–1	0–1–2	1–1–1	0–1–2	3–7–5
N.Y. Islanders	0–2–1	1–2	1–2	2–1	2–1	6–8–1
N.Y. Rangers	1–2	1–2	2–1	3–0	2–1	9–6–0
Philadelphia	0–3	0–1–2	1–2	0–3	2–0–1	3–9–3
Pittsburgh	1–2	1–2	1–2	2–1	2–1	7–8–0
Washington	0–2–1	2–1	1–1–1	2–1	2–1	7–6–2

== Schedule and results ==
1988–89 regular season
October

Game	Result	Date	Score	Opponent	Record
1	L	October 7, 1988	4–6	Pittsburgh Penguins (1988–89)	0–1–0
2	W	October 8, 1988	6–2	Buffalo Sabres (1988–89)	1–1–0
3	L	October 11, 1988	7–8	@ Pittsburgh Penguins (1988–89)	1–2–0
4	L	October 14, 1988	1–3	Toronto Maple Leafs (1988–89)	1–3–0
5	W	October 15, 1988	8–5	New Jersey Devils (1988–89)	2–3–0
6	L	October 19, 1988	1–5	@ New York Rangers (1988–89)	2–4–0
7	L	October 21, 1988	1–4	New York Rangers (1988–89)	2–5–0
8	L	October 23, 1988	2–3	@ Winnipeg Jets (1988–89)	2–6–0
9	W	October 25, 1988	4–3 OT	@ Vancouver Canucks (1988–89)	3–6–0
10	T	October 28, 1988	2–2 OT	@ Calgary Flames (1988–89)	3–6–1
11	L	October 29, 1988	3–4 OT	@ Edmonton Oilers (1988–89)	3–7–1

November

Game	Result	Date	Score	Opponent	Record
12	T	November 1, 1988	3–3 OT	@ Detroit Red Wings (1988–89)	3–7–2
13	W	November 4, 1988	4–2	New York Islanders (1988–89)	4–7–2
14	L	November 5, 1988	3–4 OT	@ New York Islanders (1988–89)	4–8–2
15	W	November 10, 1988	4–1	Quebec Nordiques (1988–89)	5–8–2
16	L	November 12, 1988	3–6	New Jersey Devils (1988–89)	5–9–2
17	W	November 15, 1988	4–2	Minnesota North Stars (1988–89)	6–9–2
18	W	November 18, 1988	3–2	Hartford Whalers (1988–89)	7–9–2
19	W	November 19, 1988	3–2	@ New Jersey Devils (1988–89)	8–9–2
20	W	November 22, 1988	4–2	@ New York Islanders (1988–89)	9–9–2
21	W	November 23, 1988	7–6	New York Islanders (1988–89)	10–9–2
22	L	November 25, 1988	3–5	Pittsburgh Penguins (1988–89)	10–10–2
23	W	November 27, 1988	4–3	@ Detroit Red Wings (1988–89)	11–10–2
24	W	November 29, 1988	4–3	St. Louis Blues (1988–89)	12–10–2
25	L	November 30, 1988	4–6	@ Pittsburgh Penguins (1988–89)	12–11–2

December

Game	Result	Date	Score	Opponent	Record
26	T	December 3, 1988	1–1 OT	Boston Bruins (1988–89)	12–11–3
27	W	December 6, 1988	4–3	Philadelphia Flyers (1988–89)	13–11–3
28	L	December 7, 1988	1–5	@ New Jersey Devils (1988–89)	13–12–3
29	T	December 10, 1988	0–0 OT	@ Montreal Canadiens (1988–89)	13–12–4
30	W	December 11, 1988	6–4	@ Buffalo Sabres (1988–89)	14–12–4
31	W	December 13, 1988	4–1	@ Quebec Nordiques (1988–89)	15–12–4
32	L	December 15, 1988	1–4	@ Philadelphia Flyers (1988–89)	15–13–4
33	W	December 17, 1988	6–3	Winnipeg Jets (1988–89)	16–13–4
34	L	December 19, 1988	1–3	@ New York Rangers (1988–89)	16–14–4
35	W	December 21, 1988	4–3	@ Chicago Blackhawks (1988–89)	17–14–4
36	T	December 23, 1988	2–2 OT	New York Rangers (1988–89)	17–14–5
37	W	December 27, 1988	4–3	Philadelphia Flyers (1988–89)	18–14–5
38	W	December 30, 1988	5–3	Buffalo Sabres (1988–89)	19–14–5
39	L	December 31, 1988	4–6	@ New York Islanders (1988–89)	19–15–5

January

Game	Result	Date	Score	Opponent	Record
40	W	January 2, 1989	8–0	Pittsburgh Penguins (1988–89)	20–15–5
41	T	January 4, 1989	3–3 OT	@ New York Rangers (1988–89)	20–15–6
42	W	January 6, 1989	3–0	Toronto Maple Leafs (1988–89)	21–15–6
43	W	January 7, 1989	6–3	Chicago Blackhawks (1988–89)	22–15–6
44	T	January 10, 1989	4–4 OT	@ Quebec Nordiques (1988–89)	22–15–7
45	W	January 11, 1989	3–2	@ Toronto Maple Leafs (1988–89)	23–15–7
46	W	January 13, 1989	5–3	Edmonton Oilers (1988–89)	24–15–7
47	L	January 15, 1989	3–4	Boston Bruins (1988–89)	24–16–7
48	L	January 20, 1989	5–6 OT	New Jersey Devils (1988–89)	24–17–7
49	L	January 22, 1989	3–4	Detroit Red Wings (1988–89)	24–18–7
50	T	January 24, 1989	4–4 OT	Los Angeles Kings (1988–89)	24–18–8
51	W	January 26, 1989	1–0	@ Philadelphia Flyers (1988–89)	25–18–8
52	T	January 28, 1989	4–4 OT	@ St. Louis Blues (1988–89)	25–18–9
53	T	January 30, 1989	4–4 OT	@ Minnesota North Stars (1988–89)	25–18–10

February

Game	Result	Date	Score	Opponent	Record
54	W	February 1, 1989	4–3 OT	@ New York Rangers (1988–89)	26–18–10
55	W	February 3, 1989	1–0	Hartford Whalers (1988–89)	27–18–10
56	L	February 5, 1989	1–3	Philadelphia Flyers (1988–89)	27–19–10
57	L	February 10, 1989	6–7 OT	Los Angeles Kings (1988–89)	27–20–10
58	L	February 11, 1989	1–2	Calgary Flames (1988–89)	27–21–10
59	W	February 14, 1989	5–3	@ St. Louis Blues (1988–89)	28–21–10
60	L	February 15, 1989	4–7	@ Chicago Blackhawks (1988–89)	28–22–10
61	W	February 17, 1989	8–2	@ Edmonton Oilers (1988–89)	29–22–10
62	L	February 19, 1989	2–3	@ Vancouver Canucks (1988–89)	29–23–10
63	L	February 20, 1989	2–6	@ Calgary Flames (1988–89)	29–24–10
64	W	February 22, 1989	7–2	@ Los Angeles Kings (1988–89)	30–24–10
65	L	February 28, 1989	3–4	Minnesota North Stars (1988–89)	30–25–10

March

Game	Result	Date	Score	Opponent	Record
66	W	March 3, 1989	4–2	Pittsburgh Penguins (1988–89)	31–25–10
67	W	March 5, 1989	3–0	Vancouver Canucks (1988–89)	32–25–10
68	L	March 8, 1989	2–3	@ Montreal Canadiens (1988–89)	32–26–10
69	W	March 9, 1989	7–2	@ Boston Bruins (1988–89)	33–26–10
70	W	March 11, 1989	4–2	New York Rangers (1988–89)	34–26–10
71	W	March 14, 1989	6–3	Winnipeg Jets (1988–89)	35–26–10
72	W	March 17, 1989	4–1	Montreal Canadiens (1988–89)	36–26–10
73	W	March 18, 1989	8–2	@ Hartford Whalers (1988–89)	37–26–10
74	W	March 22, 1989	5–4	@ Pittsburgh Penguins (1988–89)	38–26–10
75	W	March 24, 1989	6–1	Philadelphia Flyers (1988–89)	39–26–10
76	W	March 26, 1989	3–2	New York Islanders (1988–89)	40–26–10
77	L	March 28, 1989	4–5	@ New York Islanders (1988–89)	40–27–10
78	L	March 30, 1989	4–5	@ Philadelphia Flyers (1988–89)	40–28–10

April

Game	Result	Date	Score	Opponent	Record
79	W	April 1, 1989	6–4	New Jersey Devils (1988–89)	41–28–10
80	L	April 2, 1989	4–7	@ New Jersey Devils (1988–89)	41–29–10

Legend: Win (2 points) Loss (0 points) Tie (1 point)

== Playoffs ==
=== Round 1: (P1) Washington Capitals vs. (P4) Philadelphia Flyers ===
April 5	Philadelphia Flyers	2–3	Washington Capitals	Capital Centre	Recap
Brian Propp (1) – 07:49; Tim Kerr (1) – pp – 11:52		First period	14:49 – pp – Geoff Courtnall (1)
No scoring		Second period	12:24 – Michal Pivonka (1); 13:59 – Lou Franceschetti (1)
No scoring		Third period	No scoring
Ron Hextall 33 saves / 36 shots		Goalie stats	Pete Peeters 27 saves / 29 shots

April 6	Philadelphia Flyers	3–2	Washington Capitals	Capital Centre	Recap
No scoring		First period	No scoring
No scoring		Second period	19:59 – pp – Dino Ciccarelli (1)
Keith Acton (1) – 07:08; Brian Propp (2) – pp – 11:25; Brian Propp (3) – pp – 19:09		Third period	02:40 – Geoff Courtnall (2)
Ron Hextall 19 saves / 21 shots		Goalie stats	Pete Peeters 23 saves / 26 shots

April 8	Washington Capitals	4–3	OT	Philadelphia Flyers	Spectrum	Recap
Bob Rouse (1) – 08:16		First period		05:19 – pp – Rick Tocchet (1)
Stephen Leach (1) – pp – 16:15		Second period		03:47 – Scott Mellanby (1)
Bengt-Ake Gustafsson (1) – pp – 12:15		Third period		05:30 – Brian Propp (4)
Kelly Miller (1) – 00:51		First overtime period		No scoring
Pete Peeters 21 saves / 24 shots		Goalie stats		Ron Hextall 40 saves / 44 shots

April 9	Washington Capitals	2–5	Philadelphia Flyers	Spectrum	Recap
No scoring		First period	No scoring
No scoring		Second period	03:41 – pp – Tim Kerr (2); 08:54 – Dave Poulin (1); 12:01 – Gord Murphy (1); 19:00 – pp – Rick Tocchet (2)
Dino Ciccarelli (2) – pp – 10:03; Michal Pivonka (2) – sh – 11:32		Third period	02:11 – Scott Mellanby (2)
Pete Peeters 26 saves / 31 shots		Goalie stats	Ron Hextall 30 saves / 32 shots

April 11	Philadelphia Flyers	8–5	Washington Capitals	Capital Centre	Recap
Rick Tocchet (3) – 03:32; Mike Bullard (1) – 09:35		First period	03:11 – Bob Rouse (2); 15:53 – pp – Dave Christian (1)
Tim Kerr (3) – 08:57; Tim Kerr (4) – pp – 14:32		Second period	04:41 – Michal Pivonka (3); 12:31 – pp – Dino Ciccarelli (3)
Brian Propp (5) – 08:03; Pelle Eklund (1) – pp – 13:52; Kjell Samuelsson (1) – 16:32; Ron Hextall (1) – sh-en – 18:58		Third period	05:35 – pp – Calle Johansson (1)
Ron Hextall 29 saves / 34 shots		Goalie stats	Pete Peeters 18 saves / 25 shots

April 13	Washington Capitals	3–4	Philadelphia Flyers	Spectrum	Recap
Kevin Hatcher (1) – pp – 07:02		First period	No scoring
No scoring		Second period	05:21 – sh – Brian Propp (6); 15:42 – pp – Gord Murphy (2)
Scott Stevens (1) – 03:28; Bengt-Ake Gustafsson (2) – 13:13		Third period	07:27 – Rick Tocchet (4); 16:42 – Rick Tocchet (5)
Pete Peeters 24 saves / 28 shots		Goalie stats	Ron Hextall 31 saves / 34 shots

Philadelphia won series 4–2

== Player statistics ==
=== Regular season ===
Scoring

Player	Pos	GP	G	A	Pts	PIM	+/-	PPG	SHG	GWG
Mike Ridley	C	80	41	48	89	49	17	16	0	9
Geoff Courtnall	LW	79	42	38	80	112	11	16	0	6
Bengt-Ake Gustafsson	RW	72	18	51	69	18	13	5	4	6
Scott Stevens	D	80	7	61	68	225	1	6	0	3
Dave Christian	RW	80	34	31	65	12	2	16	1	1
Dale Hunter	C	80	20	37	57	219	-3	9	0	3
Mike Gartner	RW	56	26	29	55	71	8	6	0	1
Kelly Miller	LW	78	19	21	40	45	13	2	1	3
Kevin Hatcher	D	62	13	27	40	101	19	3	0	2
Larry Murphy	D	65	7	29	36	70	-5	3	0	0
Stephen Leach	RW	74	11	19	30	94	-4	4	0	0
Michal Pivonka	C	52	8	19	27	30	9	1	0	1
Rod Langway	D	76	2	19	21	65	12	0	0	0
Bobby Gould	RW	75	5	13	18	65	-2	0	1	0
Lou Franceschetti	RW	63	7	10	17	123	-4	0	0	0
Dino Ciccarelli	RW	11	12	3	15	12	10	3	0	3
John Druce	RW	48	8	7	15	62	7	0	0	1
Grant Ledyard	D	61	3	11	14	43	1	1	0	1
Mike Millar	RW	18	6	3	9	4	-4	3	0	1
Calle Johansson	D	12	1	7	8	4	1	1	0	0
Chris Felix	D	21	0	8	8	8	7	0	0	0
Neil Sheehy	D	72	3	4	7	179	-1	0	0	0
Doug Wickenheiser	C	16	2	5	7	4	0	1	0	0
Peter Sundstrom	LW	35	4	2	6	12	-5	0	0	0
Yvon Corriveau	LW	33	3	2	5	62	0	0	0	0
Bill Houlder	D	8	0	3	3	4	7	0	0	0
Jim Thomson	RW	14	2	0	2	53	-3	0	0	0
Bob Rouse	D	13	0	2	2	36	2	0	0	0
Kent Carlson	D	2	1	0	1	0	2	0	0	0
Scot Kleinendorst	D	3	0	1	1	10	0	0	0	0
Clint Malarchuk	G	42	0	1	1	16	0	0	0	0
Pete Peeters	G	35	0	1	1	8	0	0	0	0
Don Beaupre	G	11	0	0	0	6	0	0	0	0
Shawn Cronin	D	1	0	0	0	0	0	0	0	0

Goaltending

Player	MIN	GP	W	L	T	GA	GAA	SO	SA	SV	SV%
Pete Peeters	1854	33	20	7	3	88	2.85	4	790	702	.889
Clint Malarchuk	2428	42	16	18	7	141	3.48	1	1145	1004	.877
Don Beaupre	578	11	5	4	0	28	2.91	1	269	241	.896
Team:	4860	80	41	29	10	257	3.17	6	2204	1947	.883

=== Playoffs ===
Scoring

Player	Pos	GP	G	A	Pts	PIM	PPG	SHG	GWG
Geoff Courtnall	LW	6	2	5	7	12	1	0	0
Dino Ciccarelli	RW	6	3	3	6	12	3	0	0
Bengt-Ake Gustafsson	RW	4	2	3	5	6	1	0	0
Kevin Hatcher	D	6	1	4	5	20	1	0	0
Scott Stevens	D	6	1	4	5	11	0	0	0
Mike Ridley	C	6	0	5	5	2	0	0	0
Michal Pivonka	C	6	3	1	4	10	0	1	0
Dale Hunter	C	6	0	4	4	29	0	0	0
Calle Johansson	D	6	1	2	3	0	1	0	0
Bob Rouse	D	6	2	0	2	4	0	0	0
Dave Christian	RW	6	1	1	2	0	1	0	0
Bobby Gould	RW	6	0	2	2	0	0	0	0
Lou Franceschetti	RW	6	1	0	1	8	0	0	1
Stephen Leach	RW	6	1	0	1	12	1	0	0
Kelly Miller	LW	6	1	0	1	2	0	0	1
Chris Felix	D	1	0	1	1	0	0	0	0
Yvon Corriveau	LW	1	0	0	0	0	0	0	0
John Druce	RW	1	0	0	0	0	0	0	0
Rod Langway	D	6	0	0	0	6	0	0	0
Pete Peeters	G	6	0	0	0	2	0	0	0
Neil Sheehy	D	6	0	0	0	19	0	0	0
Doug Wickenheiser	C	5	0	0	0	2	0	0	0

Goaltending

Player	MIN	GP	W	L	GA	GAA	SO	SA	SV	SV%
Pete Peeters	359	6	2	4	24	4.01	0	164	140	.854
Team:	359	6	2	4	24	4.01	0	164	140	.854

Note: GP = Games played; G = Goals; A = Assists; Pts = Points; +/- = Plus/minus; PIM = Penalty minutes; PPG=Power-play goals; SHG=Short-handed goals; GWG=Game-winning goals
MIN=Minutes played; W = Wins; L = Losses; T = Ties; GA = Goals against; GAA = Goals against average; SO = Shutouts; SA=Shots against; SV=Shots saved; SV% = Save percentage;

== Draft picks ==
Washington's draft picks at the 1988 NHL entry draft held at the Montreal Forum in Montreal.

Round	#	Player	Nationality	College/Junior/Club team (League)
1	15	Reggie Savage	Canada	Victoriaville Tigres (QMJHL)
2	36	Tim Taylor	Canada	London Knights (OHL)
2	41	Wade Bartley	Canada	Dauphin Kings (MJHL)
3	57	Duane Derksen	Canada	Winkler Flyers (MJHL)
4	78	Rob Krauss	Canada	Lethbridge Hurricanes (WHL)
6	120	Dmitri Khristich	Soviet Union	Sokil Kyiv (USSR)
7	141	Keith Jones	Canada	Niagara Falls Canucks (NDJBHL)
7	144	Brad Schlegel	Canada	London Knights (WHL)
8	162	Todd Hilditch	Canada	Penticton Knights (BCJHL)
9	183	Petr Pavlas	Czechoslovakia	Dukla Trenčín (Czechoslovakia)
10	192	Mark Sorensen	Canada	University of Michigan (CCHA)
10	204	Claudio Scremin	Canada	University of Maine (Hockey East)
11	225	Chris Venkus	United States	Western Michigan University (CCHA)
12	246	Ron Pascucci	United States	Belmont Hill School (USHS-MA)
S	20	Harry Mews	Canada	Northeastern University (Hockey East)
