= Tony Joseph (ice hockey) =

- Born: March 1, 1969 (age 56); Cornwall, Ontario, Canada
- Height: 6 ft 4 in (193 cm)
- Weight: 203 lb (92 kg; 14 st 7 lb)
- Position: Right wing
- Shot: Right
- Played for: Winnipeg Jets; Tappara
- NHL draft: 94th overall, 1988; Winnipeg Jets
- Playing career: 1989–1994

Anthony Joseph (born March 1, 1969) is a Canadian former professional ice hockey right winger who played two games in the National Hockey League as a member of the Winnipeg Jets.
