= Chris McRae =

Canadian ice hockey player

- Born: August 26, 1965 (age 60) Beaverton, Ontario, Canada
- Height: 6 ft 0 in (183 cm)
- Weight: 195 lb (88 kg; 13 st 13 lb)
- Position: Left wing
- Shot: Left
- Played for: Toronto Maple Leafs; Detroit Red Wings
- NHL draft: Undrafted
- Playing career: 1984–1992

Chris McRae (born August 26, 1965) is a Canadian former professional ice hockey player who played 21 games in the National Hockey League. He played with the Toronto Maple Leafs and Detroit Red Wings.

As a youth, he played in the 1978 Quebec International Pee-Wee Hockey Tournament with a minor ice hockey team from Thornhill, Ontario. His brother is Basil McRae.

== Career statistics ==
=== Regular season and playoffs ===
			Regular season					Playoffs
Season	Team	League	GP	G	A	Pts	PIM	GP	G	A	Pts	PIM
1982–83	Newmarket Flyers	OJHL	42	11	22	33	207	—	—	—	—	—
1983–84	Belleville Bulls	OHL	9	0	0	0	19	—	—	—	—	—
1983–84	Sudbury Wolves	OHL	53	14	31	45	120	—	—	—	—	—
1984–85	Sudbury Wolves	OHL	6	0	2	2	10	—	—	—	—	—
1984–85	Oshawa Generals	OHL	43	8	7	15	118	5	0	1	1	2
1984–85	St. Catharines Saints	AHL	6	4	3	7	24	—	—	—	—	—
1985–86	St. Catharines Saints	AHL	59	1	1	2	233	11	0	1	1	65
1986–87	Newmarket Saints	AHL	51	3	6	9	193	—	—	—	—	—
1987–88	Newmarket Saints	AHL	34	7	6	13	165	—	—	—	—	—
1987–88	Toronto Maple Leafs	NHL	11	0	0	0	65	—	—	—	—	—
1988–89	Newmarket Saints	AHL	18	3	1	4	85	—	—	—	—	—
1988–89	Denver Rangers	IHL	23	1	4	5	121	2	0	0	0	20
1988–89	Toronto Maple Leafs	NHL	3	0	0	0	12	—	—	—	—	—
1989–90	Adirondack Red Wings	AHL	46	9	10	19	290	—	—	—	—	—
1989–90	Detroit Red Wings	NHL	7	1	0	1	45	—	—	—	—	—
1990–91	Adirondack Red Wings	AHL	23	2	3	5	109	2	0	0	0	11
1991–92	Fort Wayne Komets	IHL	60	20	14	34	413	5	1	0	1	44
NHL totals			21	1	0	1	122	—	—	—	—	—
