= Steven Fletcher (ice hockey) =

Canadian ice hockey player

- Born: March 31, 1962 (age 64) Montreal, Quebec, Canada
- Height: 6 ft 2 in (188 cm)
- Weight: 221 lb (100 kg; 15 st 11 lb)
- Position: Left wing
- Shot: Left
- Played for: Montreal Canadiens; Winnipeg Jets
- NHL draft: 202nd overall, 1980; Calgary Flames
- Playing career: 1982–1996; 2002

Steven Craig Fletcher (born March 31, 1962) is a Canadian former professional ice hockey player.

== Career ==
Fletcher was drafted 202nd overall by the Calgary Flames in the 1980 NHL entry draft. He played in four NHL games with the Montreal Canadiens and Winnipeg Jets over parts of two seasons. Fletcher also played six seasons with the Fort Wayne Komets of the IHL and finished his career with the Atlanta Knights. Six years later, he played a single game out of retirement for the Komets in the 2002–03 season. Fletcher was inducted into the Komets Hall of Fame and had his number #77 jersey retired on November 17, 2007.

== Career statistics ==
			Regular season					Playoffs
Season	Team	League	GP	G	A	Pts	PIM	GP	G	A	Pts	PIM
1979–80	Hull Olympiques	QMJHL	61	2	14	16	183	4	0	0	0	5
1980–81	Hull Olympiques	QMJHL	66	4	13	17	231	—	—	—	—	—
1981–82	Hull Olympiques	QMJHL	60	4	20	24	230	14	1	9	10	57
1982–93	Sherbrooke Jets	AHL	36	0	1	1	119	—	—	—	—	—
1982–83	Fort Wayne Komets	IHL	34	1	9	10	115	10	1	6	7	45
1983–84	Sherbrooke Jets	AHL	77	3	7	10	208	—	—	—	—	—
1984–85	Sherbrooke Canadiens	AHL	50	2	4	6	192	13	0	0	0	48
1985–86	Sherbrooke Canadiens	AHL	64	2	12	14	293	—	—	—	—	—
1986–87	Sherbrooke Canadiens	AHL	70	15	11	26	261	17	6	5	11	82
1987–88	Sherbrooke Canadiens	AHL	76	8	21	29	338	6	2	1	3	28
1987–88	Montreal Canadiens	NHL	—	—	—	—	—	1	0	0	0	5
1988–89	Moncton Hawks	AHL	23	1	1	2	89	—	—	—	—	—
1988–89	Winnipeg Jets	NHL	3	0	0	0	5	—	—	—	—	—
1988–89	Hershey Bears	AHL	29	5	8	13	91	—	—	—	—	—
1989–90	Hershey Bears	AHL	28	1	1	2	132	—	—	—	—	—
1990–91	Fort Wayne Komets	IHL	66	7	9	16	289	15	2	0	2	70
1991–92	Fort Wayne Komets	IHL	60	8	3	11	320	5	0	0	0	14
1992–93	Fort Wayne Komets	IHL	52	5	6	11	337	3	0	0	0	2
1993–94	Fort Wayne Komets	IHL	47	4	6	10	277	5	0	0	0	33
1994–95	Fort Wayne Komets	IHL	43	0	2	2	204	1	0	0	0	0
1995–96	Fort Wayne Komets	IHL	2	2	0	2	39	—	—	—	—	—
1995–96	Atlanta Knights	IHL	23	0	1	1	110	—	—	—	—	—
2002–03	Fort Wayne Komets	UHL	1	0	0	0	7	—	—	—	—	—
NHL totals			3	0	0	0	5	1	0	0	0	5
