= Joel Baillargeon =

Canadian ice hockey player (1964–2022)

- Born: October 6, 1964; Charlesbourg, Quebec, Canada
- Died: August 26, 2022 (aged 57); Quebec, Quebec
- Height: 6 ft 1 in (185 cm)
- Weight: 205 lb (93 kg; 14 st 9 lb)
- Position: Left wing
- Shot: Left
- Played for: Winnipeg Jets; Quebec Nordiques
- NHL draft: 109th overall, 1983; Winnipeg Jets
- Playing career: 1983–1997

Joel Baillargeon (October 6, 1964 – August 26, 2022) was a Canadian ice hockey player.

Baillargeon was born in Charlesbourg, Quebec. As a youth, he played in the 1976 and 1977 Quebec International Pee-Wee Hockey Tournaments with a minor ice hockey team from Charlesbourg. He later played as a left winger in parts of three seasons for the Winnipeg Jets and Quebec Nordiques in the National Hockey League. He died in 2022 at the age of 57.

== Career statistics ==
=== Regular season and playoffs ===
			Regular season					Playoffs
Season	Team	League	GP	G	A	Pts	PIM	GP	G	A	Pts	PIM
1981–82	Trois-Rivieres Draveurs	QMJHL	26	1	3	4	47	22	1	1	2	58
1982–83	Trois-Rivieres Draveurs	QMJHL	29	4	5	9	200	—	—	—	—	—
1982–83	Hull Olympiques	QMJHL	25	15	7	22	76	7	0	2	2	27
1983–84	Hull Olympiques	QMJHL	39	29	25	54	133	—	—	—	—	—
1983–84	Chicoutimi Saguenéens	QMJHL	21	19	10	29	51	—	—	—	—	—
1983–84	Sherbrooke Jets	AHL	8	0	0	0	26	—	—	—	—	—
1984–85	Granby Bisons	QMJHL	32	25	24	49	160	—	—	—	—	—
1985–86	Sherbrooke Canadiens	AHL	56	6	12	18	115	—	—	—	—	—
1986–87	Winnipeg Jets	NHL	11	0	1	1	15	—	—	—	—	—
1986–87	Sherbrooke Canadiens	AHL	44	9	18	27	137	6	2	2	4	27
1986–87	Fort Wayne Komets	IHL	4	1	1	2	37	—	—	—	—	—
1987–88	Winnipeg Jets	NHL	4	0	1	1	12	—	—	—	—	—
1987–88	Moncton Hawks	AHL	48	8	14	22	133	—	—	—	—	—
1988–89	Quebec Nordiques	NHL	5	0	0	0	4	—	—	—	—	—
1988–89	Halifax Citadels	AHL	53	11	19	30	122	4	1	0	1	26
1989–90	Halifax Citadels	AHL	21	0	3	3	39	—	—	—	—	—
1996–97	Vanier Voyageurs	QSPHL	23	4	5	9	41	—	—	—	—	—
NHL totals			20	0	2	2	31	—	—	—	—	—
AHL totals			230	34	66	100	572	10	3	2	5	53
