= 1988–89 New York Rangers season =

NHL hockey team season

1988–89 New York Rangers
- Division: 3rd Patrick
- Conference: 6th Wales
- 1988–89 record: 37–35–8
- Home record: 21–17–2
- Road record: 16–18–6
- Goals for: 310
- Goals against: 307

Team information
- General manager: Phil Esposito
- Coach: Michel Bergeron; Phil Esposito (interim)
- Captain: Kelly Kisio
- Arena: Madison Square Garden

Team leaders
- Goals: Tony Granato (36)
- Assists: Tomas Sandström (56)
- Points: Tomas Sandstrom (88)
- Penalty minutes: Rudy Poeschek (199)
- Wins: John Vanbiesbrouck (28)
- Goals against average: John Vanbiesbrouck (3.69)

The 1988–89 New York Rangers season was the franchise's 63rd season. The team returned to the playoffs for the 11th time in 12 seasons. A major storyline of the season was Guy Lafleur's comeback from retirement.

== Regular season ==
=== Guy Lafleur ===
After being inducted into the Hockey Hall of Fame, Guy Lafleur returned to the NHL during the 1988–89 season with the New York Rangers. Lafleur remained one of the few players that did not wear protective helmets due to the Grandfather clause. A highlight of Lafleur's season was the opportunity to be on the same team with Marcel Dionne. During his first game back in the Montreal Forum, he scored twice against Patrick Roy during the Rangers' 7–5 loss to the Canadiens. Although his high-scoring days were well behind him, his stint with the Rangers was moderately successful and he helped the team to first place in the Patrick Division until being knocked out by a knee injury. The Rangers would finish the season in third place.

=== Season standings ===
Patrick Division
	GP	W	L	T	GF	GA	Pts
**Washington Capitals**	80	41	29	10	305	259	92
**Pittsburgh Penguins**	80	40	33	7	347	349	87
**New York Rangers**	80	37	35	8	310	307	82
**Philadelphia Flyers**	80	36	36	8	307	285	80
New Jersey Devils	80	27	41	12	281	325	66
New York Islanders	80	28	47	5	265	325	61

Note: GP = Games played, W = Wins, L = Losses, T = Ties, Pts = Points, GF = Goals for, GA = Goals against
Note: Teams that qualified for the playoffs are highlighted in bold.

=== Record vs. opponents ===
==== Vs. Wales Conference ====
**Vs. Patrick Division**

1988–89 NHL records
Team	**NJD**	**NYI**	**NYR**	**PHI**	**PIT**	**WSH**	**Total**
New Jersey	—	1–4–2	4–3	2–5	1–4–2	4–3	12–19–4
N.Y. Islanders	4–1–2	—	2–5	1–5–1	2–4–1	3–4	12–19–4
N.Y. Rangers	3–4	5–2	—	3–3–1	3–3–1	3–2–2	17–14–4
Philadelphia	5–2	5–1–1	3–3–1	—	3–4	3–4	19–14–2
Pittsburgh	4–1–2	4–2–1	3–3–1	4–3	—	4–3	19–12–4
Washington	3–4	4–3	2–3–2	4–3	3–4	—	16–17–2

**Vs. Adams Division**

1988–89 NHL records
Team	**BOS**	**BUF**	**HFD**	**MTL**	**QUE**	**Total**
New Jersey	0–2–1	1–2	1–2	0–3	1–2	3–11–1
N.Y. Islanders	1–2	0–3	1–2	2–1	2–1	6–9–0
N.Y. Rangers	0–1–2	0–3	1–2	0–3	2–1	3–10–2
Philadelphia	1–2	2–1	1–1–1	0–1–2	2–1	6–6–3
Pittsburgh	1–1–1	1–2	1–2	1–2	1–2	5–9–1
Washington	1–1–1	3–0	3–0	1–1–1	2–0–1	10–2–3

==== Vs. Campbell Conference ====
**Vs. Norris Division**

1988–89 NHL records
Team	**CHI**	**DET**	**MIN**	**STL**	**TOR**	**Total**
New Jersey	2–1	2–0–1	1–1–1	2–1	2–1	9–4–2
N.Y. Islanders	0–3	0–3	2–1	1–2	1–2	4–11–0
N.Y. Rangers	2–0–1	0–3	2–1	3–0	1–1–1	8–5–2
Philadelphia	3–0	1–2	2–1	0–3	2–1	8–7–0
Pittsburgh	3–0	2–0–1	1–2	1–1–1	2–1	9–4–2
Washington	2–1	1–1–1	1–1–1	2–0–1	2–1	8–4–3

**Vs. Smythe Division**

1988–89 NHL records
Team	**CGY**	**EDM**	**LAK**	**VAN**	**WIN**	**Total**
New Jersey	0–3	2–1	0–1–2	1–1–1	0–1–2	3–7–5
N.Y. Islanders	0–2–1	1–2	1–2	2–1	2–1	6–8–1
N.Y. Rangers	1–2	1–2	2–1	3–0	2–1	9–6–0
Philadelphia	0–3	0–1–2	1–2	0–3	2–0–1	3–9–3
Pittsburgh	1–2	1–2	1–2	2–1	2–1	7–8–0
Washington	0–2–1	2–1	1–1–1	2–1	2–1	7–6–2

== Schedule and results ==
1988–89 regular season
October: 8–2–1 (home: 5–2–0; road: 3–0–1)

Game	October	Opponent	Score	Record
1	6	@ Chicago Blackhawks	2 – 2 OT	0–0–1
2	8	@ St. Louis Blues	4 – 2	1–0–1
3	10	New Jersey Devils	5 – 0	1–1–1
4	12	Hartford Whalers	4 – 3	1–2–1
5	16	Vancouver Canucks	3 – 2	2–2–1
6	19	Washington Capitals	5 – 1	3–2–1
7	21	@ Washington Capitals	4 – 1	4–2–1
8	23	Quebec Nordiques	8 – 2	5–2–1
9	26	Philadelphia Flyers	4 – 3	6–2–1
10	29	@ Philadelphia Flyers	6 – 5	7–2–1
11	30	Pittsburgh Penguins	9 – 2	8–2–1

November: 6–6–2 (home: 2–2–1; road: 4–4–1)

Game	November	Opponent	Score	Record
12	2	@ Buffalo Sabres	6 – 4	8–3–1
13	6	@ New Jersey Devils	6 – 5	8–4–1
14	8	@ New York Islanders	4 – 3	8–5–1
15	9	Philadelphia Flyers	5 – 3	9–5–1
16	11	Boston Bruins	4 – 4 OT	9–5–2
17	13	Detroit Red Wings	5 – 3	9–6–2
18	15	@ Philadelphia Flyers	3 – 3 OT	9–6–3
19	17	@ Los Angeles Kings	6 – 5	10–6–3
20	19	@ Minnesota North Stars	4 – 1	11–6–3
21	21	Montreal Canadiens	4 – 2	11–7–3
22	23	@ Pittsburgh Penguins	8 – 2	11–8–3
23	26	@ New York Islanders	6 – 4	12–8–3
24	27	New York Islanders	5 – 3	13–8–3
25	29	@ Winnipeg Jets	4 – 3	14–8–3

December: 6–6–2 (home: 4–2–0; road: 2–4–2)

Game	December	Opponent	Score	Record
26	1	@ Calgary Flames	6 – 3	14–9–3
27	4	@ Edmonton Oilers	10 – 6	14–10–3
28	6	@ Vancouver Canucks	5 – 3	15–10–3
29	8	@ Hartford Whalers	5 – 4	15–11–3
30	10	@ Boston Bruins	1 – 1 OT	15–11–4
31	12	Los Angeles Kings	5 – 2	15–12–4
32	14	New York Islanders	2 – 1	16–12–4
33	17	@ Montreal Canadiens	6 – 3	16–13–4
34	19	Washington Capitals	3 – 1	17–13–4
35	21	Buffalo Sabres	5 – 2	17–14–4
36	23	@ Washington Capitals	2 – 2 OT	17–14–5
37	26	New Jersey Devils	5 – 1	18–14–5
38	27	@ New Jersey Devils	7 – 5	19–14–5
39	31	Chicago Blackhawks	4 – 1	20–14–5

January: 8–2–3 (home: 3–1–1; road: 5–1–2)

Game	January	Opponent	Score	Record
40	2	Hartford Whalers	5 – 4	21–14–5
41	4	Washington Capitals	3 – 3 OT	21–14–6
42	7	@ New York Islanders	5 – 1	22–14–6
43	9	New Jersey Devils	5 – 4	22–15–6
44	14	@ Pittsburgh Penguins	4 – 4 OT	22–15–7
45	15	Pittsburgh Penguins	6 – 4	23–15–7
46	18	@ Chicago Blackhawks	6 – 4	24–15–7
47	19	@ St. Louis Blues	5 – 0	25–15–7
48	21	@ Vancouver Canucks	5 – 4 OT	26–15–7
49	23	@ Edmonton Oilers	3 – 2	27–15–7
50	26	@ Calgary Flames	5 – 3	27–16–7
51	28	@ Toronto Maple Leafs	1 – 1 OT	27–16–8
52	30	New York Islanders	7 – 3	28–16–8

February: 5–7–0 (home: 3–5–0; road: 2–2–0)

Game	February	Opponent	Score	Record
53	1	Washington Capitals	4 – 3 OT	28–17–8
54	4	@ Montreal Canadiens	7 – 5	28–18–8
55	5	Minnesota North Stars	5 – 3	28–19–8
56	9	Winnipeg Jets	4 – 3	29–19–8
57	12	Edmonton Oilers	3 – 1	29–20–8
58	14	@ Philadelphia Flyers	3 – 1	29–21–8
59	17	Toronto Maple Leafs	10 – 6	29–22–8
60	18	@ Pittsburgh Penguins	5 – 3	30–22–8
61	20	New Jersey Devils	7 – 4	31–22–8
62	22	Philadelphia Flyers	6 – 4	31–23–8
63	25	@ Quebec Nordiques	7 – 2	32–23–8
64	27	Los Angeles Kings	6 – 4	33–23–8

March: 4–10–0 (home: 4–4–0; road: 0–6–0)

Game	March	Opponent	Score	Record
65	1	Toronto Maple Leafs	7 – 4	34–23–8
66	3	@ New Jersey Devils	6 – 3	34–24–8
67	5	Boston Bruins	5 – 0	34–25–8
68	8	Buffalo Sabres	2 – 0	34–26–8
69	9	@ Detroit Red Wings	3 – 2	34–27–8
70	11	@ Washington Capitals	4 – 2	34–28–8
71	13	Calgary Flames	4 – 3	35–28–8
72	15	Winnipeg Jets	6 – 3	35–29–8
73	18	@ Quebec Nordiques	8 – 3	35–30–8
74	20	St. Louis Blues	7 – 4	36–30–8
75	22	Minnesota North Stars	3 – 1	37–30–8
76	25	@ Philadelphia Flyers	6 – 1	37–31–8
77	26	Pittsburgh Penguins	6 – 4	37–32–8
78	29	@ Detroit Red Wings	4 – 3	37–33–8

April: 0–2–0 (home: 0–1–0; road: 0–1–0)

Game	April	Opponent	Score	Record
79	1	@ Pittsburgh Penguins	5 – 2	37–34–8
80	2	New York Islanders	6 – 4	37–35–8

Legend: Win (2 points) Loss (0 points) Tie (1 point)

== Playoffs ==
1989 Stanley Cup playoffs
Division semifinals vs. (P2) Pittsburgh Penguins – Pittsburgh wins 4–0

Game	Date	Visitor	Score	Home	OT	Series
1	April 5	New York Rangers	1 – 3	Pittsburgh Penguins		Pittsburgh leads series 1-0
2	April 6	New York Rangers	4 – 7	Pittsburgh Penguins		Pittsburgh leads series 2-0
3	April 8	Pittsburgh Penguins	5 – 4	New York Rangers	OT	Pittsburgh leads series 3-0
4	April 9	Pittsburgh Penguins	4 – 3	New York Rangers		Pittsburgh wins series 4-0

Legend: Win Loss

== Player statistics ==
Skaters

Regular season
Player	GP	G	A	Pts	+/-	PIM
Tomas Sandstrom	79	32	56	88	5	148
Brian Leetch	68	23	48	71	8	50
Brian Mullen	78	29	35	64	7	60
Tony Granato	78	36	27	63	17	140
Kelly Kisio	70	26	36	62	14	91
Carey Wilson^{†}	41	21	34	55	1	45
James Patrick	68	11	36	47	3	41
Guy Lafleur	67	18	27	45	1	12
Ulf Dahlen	56	24	19	43	-6	50
John Ogrodnick	60	13	29	42	0	14
Lucien DeBlois	73	9	24	33	-6	107
Michel Petit	69	8	25	33	-15	154
Jason Lafreniere	38	8	16	24	-3	6
Marcel Dionne	37	7	16	23	-6	20
Brian Lawton^{‡}	30	7	10	17	-2	39
David Shaw	63	6	11	17	14	88
Jan Erixon	44	4	11	15	-3	27
Chris Nilan	38	7	7	14	-8	177
Mark Hardy^{†}	45	2	12	14	-8	45
Don Maloney^{‡}	31	4	9	13	2	16
Ron Greschner	58	1	10	11	9	94
Darren Turcotte	20	7	3	10	0	4
Norm Maciver^{‡}	26	0	10	10	-3	14
Kevin Miller	24	3	5	8	-1	2
Igor Liba^{‡}	10	2	5	7	1	15
Normand Rochefort	11	1	5	6	0	18
Lindy Ruff^{†}	13	0	5	5	-6	31
Rudy Poeschek	52	0	2	2	-8	199
Doug Wickenheiser^{‡}	1	1	0	1	1	0
Simon Wheeldon	6	0	1	1	-1	2
Miloslav Horava	6	0	1	1	-2	0
Dean Kennedy^{‡}	16	0	1	1	-1	40
Joe Paterson	20	0	1	1	-3	84
Stephane Brochu	1	0	0	0	1	0
Paul Cyr	1	0	0	0	0	2
James Latos	1	0	0	0	-1	0
Jayson More	1	0	0	0	-1	0
Ken Hammond^{†‡}	3	0	0	0	-3	0
Mark Janssens	5	0	0	0	-4	0
Jeff Bloemberg	9	0	0	0	2	0
Peter Laviolette	12	0	0	0	2	6

Playoffs
Player	GP	G	A	Pts	PIM
Brian Leetch	4	3	2	5	2
Tomas Sandstrom	4	3	2	5	12
Carey Wilson	4	1	2	3	2
David Shaw	4	0	2	2	30
Michel Petit	4	0	2	2	27
John Ogrodnick	3	2	0	2	0
Tony Granato	4	1	1	2	21
Ron Greschner	4	0	1	1	6
Mark Hardy	4	0	1	1	31
Chris Nilan	4	0	1	1	28
Jan Erixon	4	0	1	1	2
Guy Lafleur	4	1	0	1	0
James Patrick	4	0	1	1	2
Brian Mullen	3	0	1	1	4
Lindy Ruff	2	0	0	0	17
Darren Turcotte	1	0	0	0	0
Jason Lafreniere	3	0	0	0	17
Lucien DeBlois	4	0	0	0	4
Ulf Dahlen	4	0	0	0	0
Kelly Kisio	4	0	0	0	9

Goaltenders

Regular season
Player	GP	TOI	W	L	T	GA	GAA	SA	SV%	SO
John Vanbiesbrouck	56	3207	28	21	4	197	3.69	1662	.881	0
Bob Froese	30	1621	9	14	4	102	3.78	787	.870	1

Playoffs
Player	GP	TOI	W	L	GA	GAA	SA	SV%	SO
John Vanbiesbrouck	2	107	0	1	6	3.36	55	.891	0
Bob Froese	2	72	0	2	8	6.67	51	.843	0
Mike Richter	1	58	0	1	4	4.14	30	.867	0

^{†}Denotes player spent time with another team before joining Rangers. Stats reflect time with Rangers only.
^{‡}Traded mid-season. Stats reflect time with Rangers only.

Note:

Pos = Position;GP = Games played; G = Goals; A = Assists; Pts = Points; PIM = Penalty minutes; +/- = Plus/minus; PPG = Power-play goals; SHG = Short-handed goals; GWG = Game-winning goals
Pos = Position;GP = Games played; Min, TOI = Minutes played; W = Wins; L = Losses; T,T/OT = Ties; OTL = Overtime losses; GA = Goals-against; GAA = Goals-against average; SO = Shutouts; SA = Shots against; SV = Shots saved;SV% = Save percentage;

== Awards and records ==
- Brian Leetch, Calder Memorial Trophy
- Brian Leetch, Most Goals by a Rookie Defenseman in One Season (23)
- Most goals by rookie, season – Tony Granato (1988–89) – 36

== Draft picks ==
New York's picks at the 1988 NHL entry draft in Montreal, Canada at the Montreal Forum.

Round	#	Player	Position	Nationality	College/Junior/Club team (League)
2	22	Troy Mallette	LW	Canada	Sault Ste. Marie Greyhounds (OHL)
2	26	Murray Duval	D	Canada	Spokane Chiefs (WHL)
4	68	Tony Amonte	RW	United States	Thayer Academy (Massachusetts)
5	99	Martin Bergeron	C	Canada	Drummondville Voltigeurs (QMJHL)
6	110	Dennis Vial	D	Canada	Hamilton Steelhawks (OHL)
7	131	Mike Rosati	G	Canada	Hamilton Steelhawks (OHL)
8	152	Eric Couvrette	LW	Canada	Saint-Jean Castors (QMJHL)
10	194	Paul Cain	C	Canada	Cornwall Royals (OHL)
10	202	Eric Fenton	RW	United States	N. Yarmouth Academy (Maine)
11	215	Peter Fiorentino	D	Canada	Sault Ste. Marie Greyhounds (OHL)
12	236	Keith Slifstein	RW	United States	Choate Academy (Connecticut)

=== Supplemental Draft ===
New York's picks at the 1988 NHL supplemental draft.

Player	Position	Nationality	College/Junior/Club team (League)
Mike Hurlbut	D	United States	St. Lawrence University (ECAC)
Ron Lecinskas	LW	United States	Salem State College (NCAA)
