= 1988–89 Hartford Whalers season =

National Hockey League team season

1988–89 Hartford Whalers
- Division: 4th Adams
- Conference: 8th Wales
- 1988–89 record: 37–38–5
- Home record: 21–17–2
- Road record: 16–21–3
- Goals for: 299
- Goals against: 290

Team information
- General manager: Emile Francis
- Coach: Larry Pleau
- Captain: Ron Francis
- Alternate captains: Kevin Dineen; Dave Tippett; Joel Quenneville
- Arena: Hartford Civic Center
- Average attendance: 13,821 (90.8%)
- Minor league affiliates: Binghamton Whalers (AHL); Indianapolis Ice (IHL)

Team leaders
- Goals: Kevin Dineen (45)
- Assists: Ron Francis (48)
- Points: Kevin Dineen (89)
- Penalty minutes: Ulf Samuelsson (181)
- Plus/minus: Ulf Samuelsson (+23)
- Wins: Peter Sidorkiewicz (22)
- Goals against average: Peter Sidorkiewicz (3.03)

The 1988–89 Hartford Whalers season saw the team finish in fourth place in the Adams Division with a record of 37 wins, 38 losses, and 5 ties for 79 points. They were swept by the Montreal Canadiens in four straight games in the Division Semi-finals.

== Off-season ==
On June 11, 1988, the 1988 NHL entry draft was held at the Montreal Forum in Montreal. With their first round draft pick, the Whalers selected left winger Chris Govedaris from the Toronto Marlboros of the Ontario Hockey League. Govedaris scored 42 goals and 80 points in 69 games with the Marlboros during the 1987–88 season. With their second round selection, Hartford selected Barry Richter from the Culver Military Academy, where he scored 24 goals and 53 points in 35 games.

At the 1988 NHL supplemental draft, the Whalers selected Todd Krygier from the University of Connecticut. In 27 games with the Huskies, Krygier scored 32 goals and 71 points to lead the team in scoring. Following his season with Connecticut, Krygier signed with the New Haven Nighthawks of the American Hockey League, where he scored a goal and six points in 13 games during the 1987–88 season.

The Whalers signed Bob Bodak as a free agent on July 1. Bobak appeared in three games with the Calgary Flames during the 1987–88, earning no points and 22 penalty minutes. He played a majority of the season with the Salt Lake Golden Eagles of the IHL, where in 44 games, Bobak scored 12 goals and 22 points.

On July 6, the Whalers acquired Grant Jennings and Ed Kastelic from the Washington Capitals in exchange for Neil Sheehy and Mike Millar. Jennings appeared in one post-season game with the Capitals, earning no points. He spent the rest of the season with the Binghamton Whalers of the American Hockey League, where he scored two goals and 14 points in 56 games during the 1987–88. Kastelic scored one goal in 35 games with the Capitals during the 1987–88 season.

On August 3, Hartford signed free agent Al Tuer. Tuer appeared in six games with the Minnesota North Stars during the 1987–88 season, scoring one goal. In 68 games with the Kalamazoo Wings of the IHL, Tuer scored two goals and 17 points, while racking up 303 penalty minutes. The Whalers also signed Larry Trader, who scored two goals and six points in 30 games with the Montreal Canadiens during 1987–88.

At the waiver draft held on October 3, the Whalers lost Stew Gavin and Tom Martin to the Minnesota North Stars.

=== Draft picks ===
Hartford's selections at the 1988 NHL entry draft:

Pick #	Player	Position	Nationality	College/junior/club team
11	Chris Govedaris	Left wing	Canada	Toronto Marlboros (OHL)
32	Barry Richter	Defense	United States	Culver Military Academy (USHS-IN)
74	Dean Dyer	Center	Canada	Lake Superior State University (CCHA)
95	Scott Morrow	Left wing	United States	Northwood School (USHS-NY)
116	Corey Beaulieu	Left wing	United States	Northwood School (USHS-NY)
137	Kerry Russell	Center	Canada	Michigan State University (CCHA)
158	Jim Burke	Defense	United States	University of Maine (Hockey East)
179	Mark Hirth	Center	United States	Michigan State University (CCHA)
200	Wayde Bucsis	Left wing	Canada	Prince Albert Raiders (WHL)
221	Rob White	Defense	Canada	St. Lawrence University (ECAC Hockey)
242	Dan Slatalla	Center	United States	Deerfield Academy (USHS-MA)
S	Todd Krygier	Left wing	United States	University of Connecticut (ECAC East)

== Regular season ==
The Whalers finished the regular season with the fewest short-handed goals scored (3) and the most short-handed goals allowed (18).

=== Final standings ===
Adams Division
	GP	W	L	T	GF	GA	Pts
**Montreal Canadiens**	80	53	18	9	315	218	115
**Boston Bruins**	80	37	29	14	289	256	88
**Buffalo Sabres**	80	38	35	7	291	299	83
**Hartford Whalers**	80	37	38	5	299	290	79
Quebec Nordiques	80	27	46	7	269	342	61

Note: GP = Games played, W = Wins, L = Losses, T = Ties, Pts = Points, GF = Goals for, GA = Goals against
Note: Teams that qualified for the playoffs are highlighted in bold.

=== Record vs. opponents ===
==== Vs. Wales Conference ====
Vs. Adams Division

1988–89 NHL records
Team	BOS	BUF	HFD	MTL	QUE	Total
Boston	—	0–5–3	5–3	0–7–1	4–1–3	**9–16–7**
Buffalo	5–0–3	—	3–5	3–5	3–4–1	**14–13–5**
Hartford	3–5	5–3	—	1–7	4–3–1	**13–18–1**
Montreal	7–0–1	5–3	7–1	—	4–4	**23–8–1**
Quebec	1–4–3	4–3–1	3–4–1	4–4	—	**12–15–5**

Vs. Patrick Division

1988–89 NHL records
Team	NJD	NYI	NYR	PHI	PIT	WSH	Total
Boston	2–0–1	2–1	1–0–2	2–1	1–1–1	1–1–1	**9–4–5**
Buffalo	2–1	3–0	3–0	1–2	2–1	0–3	**11–7–0**
Hartford	2–1	2–1	2–1	1–1–1	2–1	0–3	**9–8–1**
Montreal	3–0	1–2	3–0	1–0–2	2–1	1–1–1	**11–4–3**
Quebec	2–1	1–2	1–2	1–2	2–1	0–2–1	**7–10–1**

==== Vs. Campbell Conference ====
Vs. Norris Division

1988–89 NHL records
Team	CHI	DET	MIN	STL	TOR	Total
Boston	3–0	0–2–1	0–2–1	3–0	3–0	**9–4–2**
Buffalo	2–1	3–0	0–1–2	1–2	2–1	**8–5–2**
Hartford	2–1	2–1	2–1	1–0–2	2–1	**9–4–2**
Montreal	1–0–2	1–2	1–0–2	2–0–1	2–1	**7–3–5**
Quebec	0–2–1	2–1	2–1	0–3	0–3	**4–10–1**

Vs. Smythe Division

1988–89 NHL records
Team	CGY	EDM	LAK	VAN	WIN	Total
Boston	1–2	3–0	2–1	2–1	2–1	**10–5–0**
Buffalo	2–1	0–2–1	0–3	1–2	2–1	**5–9–1**
Hartford	1–2	1–2	1–2	1–1–1	2–1	**6–8–1**
Montreal	2–1	2–1	3–0	3–0	2–1	**12–3–0**
Quebec	1–2	0–3	0–3	1–2	2–1	**4–11–0**

== Schedule and results ==
1988–89 regular season
October

Game	Result	Date	Score	Opponent	Record
1	L	October 6, 1988	2–5	Quebec Nordiques (1988–89)	0–1–0
2	L	October 8, 1988	2–6	Boston Bruins (1988–89)	0–2–0
3	L	October 9, 1988	1–3	@ Boston Bruins (1988–89)	0–3–0
4	W	October 12, 1988	4–3	@ New York Rangers (1988–89)	1–3–0
5	W	October 15, 1988	7–5	Chicago Blackhawks (1988–89)	2–3–0
6	L	October 19, 1988	4–5	@ Montreal Canadiens (1988–89)	2–4–0
7	W	October 22, 1988	8–6	Philadelphia Flyers (1988–89)	3–4–0
8	W	October 26, 1988	7–1	@ Buffalo Sabres (1988–89)	4–4–0
9	L	October 28, 1988	3–5	@ New Jersey Devils (1988–89)	4–5–0
10	W	October 29, 1988	3–0	New Jersey Devils (1988–89)	5–5–0

November

Game	Result	Date	Score	Opponent	Record
11	L	November 1, 1988	3–5	Montreal Canadiens (1988–89)	5–6–0
12	W	November 3, 1988	5–3	@ Boston Bruins (1988–89)	6–6–0
13	L	November 5, 1988	2–3 OT	Vancouver Canucks (1988–89)	6–7–0
14	L	November 7, 1988	3–6	@ Calgary Flames (1988–89)	6–8–0
15	T	November 9, 1988	1–1 OT	@ Vancouver Canucks (1988–89)	6–8–1
16	L	November 10, 1988	2–7	@ Los Angeles Kings (1988–89)	6–9–1
17	W	November 12, 1988	3–1	@ Minnesota North Stars (1988–89)	7–9–1
18	L	November 16, 1988	3–4	Detroit Red Wings (1988–89)	7–10–1
19	L	November 18, 1988	2–3	@ Washington Capitals (1988–89)	7–11–1
20	L	November 19, 1988	2–5	Calgary Flames (1988–89)	7–12–1
21	W	November 23, 1988	4–3	Quebec Nordiques (1988–89)	8–12–1
22	W	November 26, 1988	4–2	@ Quebec Nordiques (1988–89)	9–12–1
23	L	November 30, 1988	3–6	Montreal Canadiens (1988–89)	9–13–1

December

Game	Result	Date	Score	Opponent	Record
24	W	December 2, 1988	6–1	@ Buffalo Sabres (1988–89)	10–13–1
25	L	December 3, 1988	2–4	Minnesota North Stars (1988–89)	10–14–1
26	W	December 6, 1988	9–0	Buffalo Sabres (1988–89)	11–14–1
27	W	December 8, 1988	5–4	New York Rangers (1988–89)	12–14–1
28	W	December 10, 1988	4–1	Calgary Flames (1988–89)	13–14–1
29	L	December 14, 1988	3–4	@ Chicago Blackhawks (1988–89)	13–15–1
30	T	December 15, 1988	3–3 OT	@ St. Louis Blues (1988–89)	13–15–2
31	L	December 17, 1988	2–4	Edmonton Oilers (1988–89)	13–16–2
32	L	December 19, 1988	1–2	@ Montreal Canadiens (1988–89)	13–17–2
33	L	December 21, 1988	3–4	Boston Bruins (1988–89)	13–18–2
34	L	December 23, 1988	4–5	@ Philadelphia Flyers (1988–89)	13–19–2
35	L	December 26, 1988	3–4 OT	Pittsburgh Penguins (1988–89)	13–20–2
36	T	December 28, 1988	4–4 OT	@ Quebec Nordiques (1988–89)	13–20–3
37	W	December 30, 1988	4–3	Detroit Red Wings (1988–89)	14–20–3
38	W	December 31, 1988	3–2	@ Detroit Red Wings (1988–89)	15–20–3

January

Game	Result	Date	Score	Opponent	Record
39	L	January 2, 1989	4–5	@ New York Rangers (1988–89)	15–21–3
40	W	January 4, 1989	5–4 OT	@ Buffalo Sabres (1988–89)	16–21–3
41	W	January 10, 1989	2–1	@ Winnipeg Jets (1988–89)	17–21–3
42	L	January 14, 1989	6–9	@ Los Angeles Kings (1988–89)	17–22–3
43	L	January 16, 1989	3–5	@ Toronto Maple Leafs (1988–89)	17–23–3
44	L	January 18, 1989	1–3	@ Montreal Canadiens (1988–89)	17–24–3
45	W	January 19, 1989	6–4	Montreal Canadiens (1988–89)	18–24–3
46	W	January 21, 1989	5–4	Los Angeles Kings (1988–89)	19–24–3
47	W	January 23, 1989	5–0	@ Quebec Nordiques (1988–89)	20–24–3
48	T	January 25, 1989	3–3 OT	St. Louis Blues (1988–89)	20–24–4
49	W	January 27, 1989	8–6	@ New Jersey Devils (1988–89)	21–24–4
50	L	January 28, 1989	2–3 OT	Quebec Nordiques (1988–89)	21–25–4
51	L	January 31, 1989	3–5	Buffalo Sabres (1988–89)	21–26–4

February

Game	Result	Date	Score	Opponent	Record
52	L	February 3, 1989	0–1	@ Washington Capitals (1988–89)	21–27–4
53	L	February 4, 1989	3–5	@ New York Islanders (1988–89)	21–28–4
54	W	February 9, 1989	5–2	Buffalo Sabres (1988–89)	22–28–4
55	W	February 11, 1989	7–3	Winnipeg Jets (1988–89)	23–28–4
56	W	February 15, 1989	4–2	@ Toronto Maple Leafs (1988–89)	24–28–4
57	W	February 18, 1989	4–3	@ Minnesota North Stars (1988–89)	25–28–4
58	L	February 19, 1989	6–7 OT	@ Winnipeg Jets (1988–89)	25–29–4
59	L	February 21, 1989	4–7	@ Edmonton Oilers (1988–89)	25–30–4
60	W	February 23, 1989	4–2	Quebec Nordiques (1988–89)	26–30–4
61	L	February 25, 1989	1–9	Boston Bruins (1988–89)	26–31–4
62	W	February 26, 1989	8–6	Pittsburgh Penguins (1988–89)	27–31–4
63	W	February 28, 1989	3–1	@ New York Islanders (1988–89)	28–31–4

March

Game	Result	Date	Score	Opponent	Record
64	W	March 2, 1989	2–1	Vancouver Canucks (1988–89)	29–31–4
65	L	March 4, 1989	1–6	Montreal Canadiens (1988–89)	29–32–4
66	W	March 5, 1989	3–0	Toronto Maple Leafs (1988–89)	30–32–4
67	W	March 8, 1989	7–3	Edmonton Oilers (1988–89)	31–32–4
68	L	March 11, 1989	3–5	@ Montreal Canadiens (1988–89)	31–33–4
69	T	March 12, 1989	3–3 OT	Philadelphia Flyers (1988–89)	31–33–5
70	W	March 14, 1989	8–2	New York Islanders (1988–89)	32–33–5
71	L	March 16, 1989	1–6	Buffalo Sabres (1988–89)	32–34–5
72	L	March 18, 1989	2–8	Washington Capitals (1988–89)	32–35–5
73	W	March 19, 1989	3–2	@ Boston Bruins (1988–89)	33–35–5
74	W	March 22, 1989	4–2	Boston Bruins (1988–89)	34–35–5
75	L	March 23, 1989	3–6	@ Quebec Nordiques (1988–89)	34–36–5
76	W	March 25, 1989	4–0	St. Louis Blues (1988–89)	35–36–5
77	L	March 28, 1989	2–4	@ Buffalo Sabres (1988–89)	35–37–5
78	W	March 30, 1989	9–5	@ Pittsburgh Penguins (1988–89)	36–37–5

April

Game	Result	Date	Score	Opponent	Record
79	W	April 1, 1989	6–1	Chicago Blackhawks (1988–89)	37–37–5
80	L	April 2, 1989	2–3	@ Boston Bruins (1988–89)	37–38–5

Legend: Win (2 points) Loss (0 points) Tie (1 point)

== Division semi-finals ==
=== Canadiens 4, Whalers 0 ===
==== Adams Division Semi-finals ====
===== (1) Montreal Canadiens vs. (4) Hartford Whalers =====
April 5	Hartford Whalers	2 – 6	Montreal Canadiens	Montreal Forum	Recap
Ferraro (1) – (MacDermid, Babych) – 14:59		First period	12:09 – pp – Keane (1) – (Svoboda, Chelios); 16:24 – Smith (1) – (Svoboda)
Young (1) – (Peterson, Quenneville) – 16:55		Second period	3:59 – sh – Walter (1) – (Carbonneau)
No scoring		Third period	6:25 – McPhee (1) – (Skrudland, Svoboda); 8:02 – pp – Näslund (1) – (Smith); 17:50 – Skrudland (1) – (McPhee)
Whitmore (0-1) (27 saves / 33 shots)		Goalie stats	Roy (1-0) (25 saves / 27 shots)

April 6	Hartford Whalers	2 – 3	Montreal Canadiens	Montreal Forum	Recap
No scoring		First period	No scoring
No scoring		Second period	0:36 – Skrudland (2) – (Green, McPhee); 17:02 – pp – Smith (2) – (Näslund, Svoboda); 18:25 – McPhee (2) – (Gilchrist, Carbonneau)
Young (2) – (Quenneville, Turgeon) – 7:03; MacDermid (1) – (Anderson, Samuelsson) – 14:10		Third period	No scoring
Sidorkiewicz (0-1) (14 saves / 17 shots)		Goalie stats	Roy (2-0) (27 saves / 29 shots)

April 8	Montreal Canadiens	5 – 4	OT	Hartford Whalers	Hartford Civic Center	Recap
No scoring		First period		17:00 – pp – Jennings (1) – (Francis, Babych)
Smith (3) – (Näslund, Chelios) – 10:47		Second period		0:56 – Dineen (1) – (Evason, Quenneville)
Courtnall (1) – (Carbonneau) – 4:10; Durfresne (1) – (Courtnall, Carbonneau) – 4:38; Carbonneau (1) – (Unassisted) – 15:28		Third period		12:52 – sh – Evason (1) – (Tippett, Samuelsson); 15:54 – Shaw (1) – (Babych, Turgeon)
Richer (1) – (Skrudland, Corson) – 5:01		First overtime period		No scoring
Hayward (1-0) (23 saves / 27 shots)		Goalie stats		Sidorkiewicz (0-2) (23 saves / 28 shots)

April 9	Montreal Canadiens	4 – 3	OT	Hartford Whalers	Hartford Civic Center	Recap
No scoring		First period		19:04 – Ferraro (2) – (Babych)
Näslund (2) – (Smith, Keane) – 1:59; Richer (2) – (Walter) – 7:08		Second period		No scoring
Smith (4) – pp – (Svoboda) – 2:56		Third period		5:29 – Babych (1) – (Côté, Evason); 14:55 – Lawton (1) – (Francis, Babych)
Russ Courtnall (2) – (Unassisted) – 15:12		First overtime period		No scoring
Roy (3-0) (43 saves / 46 shots)		Goalie stats		Whitmore (0-2) (36 saves / 40 shots)

Montreal wins series 4 – 0

== Player statistics ==
=== Forwards ===
Note: GP= Games played; G= Goals; AST= Assists; PTS = Points; PIM = Points

Player	GP	G	AST	PTS	PIM
Kevin Dineen	79	45	44	89	167
Ron Francis	69	29	48	77	36
Ray Ferraro	80	41	35	76	86
Scott Young	76	19	40	59	27
Paul MacDermid	74	17	27	44	141
Dave Tippett	80	17	24	41	45
John Anderson	62	16	24	40	28
Jody Hull	60	16	18	34	10
Sylvain Turgeon	42	16	14	30	40
Dean Evason	67	11	17	28	60
Brian Lawton	35	10	16	26	28
Carey Wilson	34	11	11	22	14
Brent Peterson	66	4	13	17	61
Don Maloney	21	3	11	14	23
Tom Martin	38	7	6	13	113
Torrie Robertson	27	2	4	6	84
Ed Kastelic	10	0	2	2	15
Mark Reeds	7	0	2	2	6
Dallas Gaume	4	1	1	2	0
Terry Yake	2	0	0	0	0
Jim Thomson	5	0	0	0	14

=== Defensemen ===
Note: GP= Games played; G= Goals; AST= Assists; PTS = Points; PIM = Points

Player	GP	G	AST	PTS	PIM
Dave Babych	70	6	41	47	54
Ulf Samuelsson	71	9	26	35	181
Norm Maciver	37	1	22	23	24
Sylvain Côté	78	8	9	17	49
Grant Jennings	55	3	10	13	159
Joel Quenneville	69	4	7	11	32
Randy Ladouceur	75	2	5	7	95
Brad Shaw	3	1	0	1	0
Scot Kleinendorst	24	0	1	1	36
Al Tuer	4	0	0	0	23
Adam Burt	5	0	0	0	6
Jim Pavese	5	0	0	0	5

=== Goaltending ===
Note: GP= Games played; W= Wins; L= Losses; T = Ties; SO = Shutouts; GAA = Goals Against

Player	GP	W	L	T	SO	GAA
Peter Sidorkiewicz	44	22	18	4	4	3.03
Mike Liut	35	13	19	1	1	4.25
Kay Whitmore	3	2	1	0	0	3.33

== Awards and records ==
- Peter Sidorkiewicz, Goaltender, NHL First All-Rookie Team

40th National Hockey League All-Star Game

- Kevin Dineen, Reserve, Prince of Wales Conference

== Transactions ==
The Whalers were involved in the following transactions during the 1988–89 season.

=== Trades ===
July 6, 1988	To Washington Capitals Neil Sheehy; Mike Millar	To Hartford Whalers Grant Jennings; Ed Kastelic
October 6, 1988	To Chicago Blackhawks Future Considerations	To Hartford Whalers Mark LaVarre
December 26, 1988	To New York Rangers Carey Wilson; 5th round pick in 1990 – Lubos Rob	To Hartford Whalers Brian Lawton; Don Maloney; Norm Maciver
March 6, 1989	To Washington Capitals Scot Kleinendorst	To Hartford Whalers Jim Thomson
March 7, 1989	To Detroit Red Wings Torrie Robertson	To Hartford Whalers Jim Pavese

=== Waivers ===
October 3, 1988	To Minnesota North Stars Stew Gavin
October 3, 1988	To Minnesota North Stars Tom Martin
December 1, 1988	From Minnesota North Stars Tom Martin

=== Free agents ===
Player	Former team
Mike Tomlak	University of Western Ontario (OUAA)
Ross McKay	University of Saskatchewan (CWUAA)
Bob Bodak	Calgary Flames
Al Tuer	Minnesota North Stars
Larry Trader	Montreal Canadiens
Chris Lindberg	University of Minnesota-Duluth (NCAA)

Player	New team
Gord Sherven	Sportbund DJK Rosenheim (Germany)
Mike McEwen	EHC Olten (Switzerland)
Shawn Cronin	Washington Capitals
