= 1988–89 Philadelphia Flyers season =

NHL hockey team season

1988–89 Philadelphia Flyers
- Division: 4th Patrick
- Conference: 7th Wales
- 1988–89 record: 36–36–8
- Home record: 22–15–3
- Road record: 14–21–5
- Goals for: 307 (8th)
- Goals against: 285 (7th)

Team information
- General manager: Bob Clarke
- Coach: Paul Holmgren
- Captain: Dave Poulin
- Alternate captains: Mark Howe; Rick Tocchet
- Arena: Spectrum
- Average attendance: 17,405
- Minor league affiliate: Hershey Bears

Team leaders
- Goals: Tim Kerr (48)
- Assists: Pelle Eklund (51)
- Points: Tim Kerr (88)
- Penalty minutes: Jeff Chychrun (245)
- Plus/minus: Ron Sutter (+25)
- Wins: Ron Hextall (30)
- Goals against average: Ron Hextall (3.23)

The 1988–89 Philadelphia Flyers season was the franchise's 22nd season in the National Hockey League (NHL). The Flyers lost in the Wales Conference finals to the Montreal Canadiens in six games.

== Regular season ==
With Mike Keenan's firing, the reins were handed off to Paul Holmgren, who presided over a club in flux with young players promoted to larger roles. The defense underwent a major overhaul, as Brad Marsh was claimed in the waiver draft by Toronto, and Doug Crossman was dealt to Los Angeles for Jay Wells. Gord Murphy and Jeff Chychrun cracked the lineup on the back line as well.

Tim Kerr was fully healed from his shoulder surgeries and subsequent infections, while Rick Tocchet, Scott Mellanby, Murray Craven, Pelle Eklund and Peter Zezel were counted on to carry the offense. After a promising 5–1–0 start, a 4–15–1 slide cost Zezel his job, shipped off to St. Louis for Mike Bullard after Thanksgiving.

Following the deal, the Flyers went 13–2–1 to climb back over .500 and into solid playoff footing. However, youth and constant inconsistency derailed much progress to the top of the standings, and the team never went higher than three games above even. Mark Laforest was replaced in March as backup by Maple Leafs castoff Ken Wregget with the team reeling.

On the last day of the season, they fell 6–5 in overtime to the Penguins and into fourth place, as Mario Lemieux scored into an empty net. If the Flyers had scored using the extra attacker, they would have leapt over the Rangers into third place in the Patrick Division. Despite their mediocre record, their positive goal differential was a positive indicator that the team still had some life left.

The Flyers finished the regular season with the league's best power-play percentage, at 26.70% (98 for 367).

=== Season standings ===
Patrick Division
	GP	W	L	T	GF	GA	Pts
**Washington Capitals**	80	41	29	10	305	259	92
**Pittsburgh Penguins**	80	40	33	7	347	349	87
**New York Rangers**	80	37	35	8	310	307	82
**Philadelphia Flyers**	80	36	36	8	307	285	80
New Jersey Devils	80	27	41	12	281	325	66
New York Islanders	80	28	47	5	265	325	61

Note: GP = Games played, W = Wins, L = Losses, T = Ties, Pts = Points, GF = Goals for, GA = Goals against
Note: Teams that qualified for the playoffs are highlighted in bold.

=== Record vs. opponents ===
==== Vs. Wales Conference ====
**Vs. Patrick Division**

1988–89 NHL records
Team	**NJD**	**NYI**	**NYR**	**PHI**	**PIT**	**WSH**	**Total**
New Jersey	—	1–4–2	4–3	2–5	1–4–2	4–3	12–19–4
N.Y. Islanders	4–1–2	—	2–5	1–5–1	2–4–1	3–4	12–19–4
N.Y. Rangers	3–4	5–2	—	3–3–1	3–3–1	3–2–2	17–14–4
Philadelphia	5–2	5–1–1	3–3–1	—	3–4	3–4	19–14–2
Pittsburgh	4–1–2	4–2–1	3–3–1	4–3	—	4–3	19–12–4
Washington	3–4	4–3	2–3–2	4–3	3–4	—	16–17–2

**Vs. Adams Division**

1988–89 NHL records
Team	**BOS**	**BUF**	**HFD**	**MTL**	**QUE**	**Total**
New Jersey	0–2–1	1–2	1–2	0–3	1–2	3–11–1
N.Y. Islanders	1–2	0–3	1–2	2–1	2–1	6–9–0
N.Y. Rangers	0–1–2	0–3	1–2	0–3	2–1	3–10–2
Philadelphia	1–2	2–1	1–1–1	0–1–2	2–1	6–6–3
Pittsburgh	1–1–1	1–2	1–2	1–2	1–2	5–9–1
Washington	1–1–1	3–0	3–0	1–1–1	2–0–1	10–2–3

==== Vs. Campbell Conference ====
**Vs. Norris Division**

1988–89 NHL records
Team	**CHI**	**DET**	**MIN**	**STL**	**TOR**	**Total**
New Jersey	2–1	2–0–1	1–1–1	2–1	2–1	9–4–2
N.Y. Islanders	0–3	0–3	2–1	1–2	1–2	4–11–0
N.Y. Rangers	2–0–1	0–3	2–1	3–0	1–1–1	8–5–2
Philadelphia	3–0	1–2	2–1	0–3	2–1	8–7–0
Pittsburgh	3–0	2–0–1	1–2	1–1–1	2–1	9–4–2
Washington	2–1	1–1–1	1–1–1	2–0–1	2–1	8–4–3

**Vs. Smythe Division**

1988–89 NHL records
Team	**CGY**	**EDM**	**LAK**	**VAN**	**WIN**	**Total**
New Jersey	0–3	2–1	0–1–2	1–1–1	0–1–2	3–7–5
N.Y. Islanders	0–2–1	1–2	1–2	2–1	2–1	6–8–1
N.Y. Rangers	1–2	1–2	2–1	3–0	2–1	9–6–0
Philadelphia	0–3	0–1–2	1–2	0–3	2–0–1	3–9–3
Pittsburgh	1–2	1–2	1–2	2–1	2–1	7–8–0
Washington	0–2–1	2–1	1–1–1	2–1	2–1	7–6–2

== Playoffs ==
Facing the first-place Washington Capitals in the first round, the Flyers pulled off the upset in six games. Ron Hextall managed to score another empty-net goal in the waning moments of Game 5, becoming the first NHL goalie to score a goal in the playoffs. The Flyers then came back from a 3 games to 2 deficit to defeat the Pittsburgh Penguins in seven games to make the Wales Conference finals before bowing out to the Montreal Canadiens in six games. This would be the Flyers last playoff appearance until 1995.

== Schedule and results ==
=== Regular season ===
1988–89 regular season
October: 6–5–0, 12 points (home: 4–2–0; road: 2–3–0)

Game	Date	Score	Opponent	Decision	Record	Points	Recap
1	October 6	4–1	New Jersey Devils	Hextall	1–0–0	2	W
2	October 9	4–3 OT	Buffalo Sabres	Hextall	2–0–0	4	W
3	October 13	7–6	@ Minnesota North Stars	Hextall	3–0–0	6	W
4	October 15	4–1	@ Los Angeles Kings	Hextall	4–0–0	8	W
5	October 18	2–4	@ Pittsburgh Penguins	Hextall	4–1–0	8	L
6	October 20	5–2	Quebec Nordiques	Hextall	5–1–0	10	W
7	October 22	6–8	@ Hartford Whalers	Laforest	5–2–0	10	L
8	October 23	4–5 OT	Calgary Flames	Hextall	5–3–0	10	L
9	October 26	3–4	@ New York Rangers	Hextall	5–4–0	10	L
10	October 27	5–2	New York Islanders	Hextall	6–4–0	12	W
11	October 29	5–6	New York Rangers	Hextall	6–5–0	12	L

November: 4–11–1, 9 points (home: 3–5–1; road: 1–6–0)

Game	Date	Score	Opponent	Decision	Record	Points	Recap
12	November 1	2–3	@ New Jersey Devils	Hextall	6–6–0	12	L
13	November 3	2–5	Vancouver Canucks	Hextall	6–7–0	12	L
14	November 4	4–3	@ Detroit Red Wings	Laforest	7–7–0	14	W
15	November 6	5–4	Pittsburgh Penguins	Laforest	8–7–0	16	W
16	November 9	3–5	@ New York Rangers	Hextall	8–8–0	16	L
17	November 10	2–3 OT	Calgary Flames	Laforest	8–9–0	16	L
18	November 12	4–5	Detroit Red Wings	Hextall	8–10–0	16	L
19	November 15	3–3 OT	New York Rangers	Hextall	8–10–1	17	T
20	November 17	1–3	St. Louis Blues	Hextall	8–11–1	17	L
21	November 19	5–6	@ Quebec Nordiques	Hextall	8–12–1	17	L
22	November 20	7–1	New Jersey Devils	Hextall	9–12–1	19	W
23	November 22	1–6	Los Angeles Kings	Hextall	9–13–1	19	L
24	November 24	1–2 OT	@ Boston Bruins	Laforest	9–14–1	19	L
25	November 26	3–4	@ Pittsburgh Penguins	Hextall	9–15–1	19	L
26	November 27	3–7	@ Buffalo Sabres	Laforest	9–16–1	19	L
27	November 29	5–1	Boston Bruins	Hextall	10–16–1	21	W

December: 11–2–1, 23 points (home: 6–0–1; road: 5–2–0)

Game	Date	Score	Opponent	Decision	Record	Points	Recap
28	December 1	2–2 OT	Montreal Canadiens	Hextall	10–16–2	22	T
29	December 3	5–3	@ New Jersey Devils	Laforest	11–16–2	24	W
30	December 4	6–2	New Jersey Devils	Laforest	12–16–2	26	W
31	December 6	3–4	@ Washington Capitals	Laforest	12–17–2	26	L
32	December 8	4–3	Pittsburgh Penguins	Hextall	13–17–2	28	W
33	December 10	6–4	Chicago Blackhawks	Hextall	14–17–2	30	W
34	December 15	4–1	Washington Capitals	Hextall	15–17–2	32	W
35	December 17	7–1	@ Toronto Maple Leafs	Hextall	16–17–2	34	W
36	December 18	5–1	Winnipeg Jets	Hextall	17–17–2	36	W
37	December 22	4–2	@ New York Islanders	Hextall	18–17–2	38	W
38	December 23	5–4	Hartford Whalers	Hextall	19–17–2	40	W
39	December 27	3–4	@ Washington Capitals	Hextall	19–18–2	40	L
40	December 29	3–2	@ Pittsburgh Penguins	Hextall	20–18–2	42	W
41	December 31	3–2	@ Buffalo Sabres	Hextall	21–18–2	44	W

January: 5–5–1, 11 points (home: 3–2–0; road: 2–3–1)

Game	Date	Score	Opponent	Decision	Record	Points	Recap
42	January 3	4–1	@ New York Islanders	Hextall	22–18–2	46	W
43	January 5	3–5	@ Minnesota North Stars	Hextall	22–19–2	46	L
44	January 7	4–7	@ St. Louis Blues	Hextall	22–20–2	46	L
45	January 10	3–2	Minnesota North Stars	Hextall	23–20–2	48	W
46	January 12	7–2	Quebec Nordiques	Hextall	24–20–2	50	W
47	January 15	4–8	Detroit Red Wings	Laforest	24–21–2	50	L
48	January 17	3–5	@ Vancouver Canucks	Hextall	24–22–2	50	L
49	January 20	1–1 OT	@ Edmonton Oilers	Hextall	24–22–3	51	T
50	January 21	7–3	@ Winnipeg Jets	Hextall	25–22–3	53	W
51	January 26	0–1	Washington Capitals	Hextall	25–23–3	53	L
52	January 28	7–4	New York Islanders	Hextall	26–23–3	55	W

February: 5–7–0, 10 points (home: 2–5–0; road: 3–2–0)

Game	Date	Score	Opponent	Decision	Record	Points	Recap
53	February 2	3–5	Pittsburgh Penguins	Hextall	26–24–3	55	L
54	February 5	3–1	@ Washington Capitals	Hextall	27–24–3	57	W
55	February 9	1–3	Edmonton Oilers	Hextall	27–25–3	57	L
56	February 11	3–4	@ Toronto Maple Leafs	Hextall	27–26–3	57	L
57	February 12	2–3	Vancouver Canucks	Hextall	27–27–3	57	L
58	February 14	3–1	New York Rangers	Hextall	28–27–3	59	W
59	February 16	4–7	Montreal Canadiens	Hextall	28–28–3	59	L
60	February 18	2–3	@ New York Islanders	Hextall	28–29–3	59	L
61	February 19	5–4	New York Islanders	Hextall	29–29–3	61	W
62	February 22	6–4	@ New York Rangers	Hextall	30–29–3	63	W
63	February 24	6–2	@ New Jersey Devils	Hextall	31–29–3	65	W
64	February 27	3–6	Calgary Flames	Hextall	31–30–3	65	L

March: 5–5–4, 14 points (home: 4–1–1; road: 1–4–3)

Game	Date	Score	Opponent	Decision	Record	Points	Recap
65	March 1	4–4 OT	@ Winnipeg Jets	Hextall	31–30–4	66	T
66	March 4	2–6	@ Los Angeles Kings	Hextall	31–31–4	66	L
67	March 7	4–4 OT	Edmonton Oilers	Hextall	31–31–5	67	T
68	March 9	4–4 OT	@ New York Islanders	Laforest	31–31–6	68	T
69	March 11	7–2	Chicago Blackhawks	Laforest	32–31–6	70	W
70	March 12	3–3 OT	@ Hartford Whalers	Laforest	32–31–7	71	T
71	March 16	3–4 OT	St. Louis Blues	Laforest	32–32–7	71	L
72	March 18	3–6	@ Boston Bruins	Wregget	32–33–7	71	L
73	March 19	8–6	Toronto Maple Leafs	Wregget	33–33–7	73	W
74	March 22	3–2	@ Chicago Blackhawks	Hextall	34–33–7	75	W
75	March 24	1–6	@ Washington Capitals	Hextall	34–34–7	75	L
76	March 25	6–1	New York Rangers	Hextall	35–34–7	77	W
77	March 27	3–5	@ New Jersey Devils	Hextall	35–35–7	77	L
78	March 30	5–4	Washington Capitals	Hextall	36–35–7	79	W

April: 0–1–1, 1 points (home: 0–1–0; road: 0–0–1)

Game	Date	Score	Opponent	Decision	Record	Points	Recap
79	April 1	2–2 OT	@ Montreal Canadiens	Hextall	36–35–8	80	T
80	April 2	5–6 OT	Pittsburgh Penguins	Hextall	36–36–8	80	L

Legend: W Win (2 points) L Loss (0 points) T Tie (1 point)

=== Playoffs ===
1989 Stanley Cup playoffs
Patrick Division semifinals vs. Washington Capitals – Flyers win 4–2

Game	Date	Score	Opponent	Decision	Series	Recap
1	April 5	2–3 OT	@ Washington Capitals	Hextall	Capitals lead 1–0	L
2	April 6	3–2	@ Washington Capitals	Hextall	Series tied 1–1	W
3	April 8	3–4 OT	Washington Capitals	Hextall	Capitals lead 2–1	L
4	April 9	5–2	Washington Capitals	Hextall	Series tied 2–2	W
5	April 11	8–5	@ Washington Capitals	Hextall	Flyers lead 3–2	W
6	April 13	4–3	Washington Capitals	Hextall	Flyers win 4–2	W

Patrick Division finals vs. Pittsburgh Penguins – Flyers win 4–3

Game	Date	Score	Opponent	Decision	Series	Recap
1	April 17	3–4	@ Pittsburgh Penguins	Hextall	Penguins lead 1–0	L
2	April 19	4–2	@ Pittsburgh Penguins	Hextall	Series tied 1–1	W
3	April 21	3–4 OT	Pittsburgh Penguins	Hextall	Penguins lead 2–1	L
4	April 23	4–1	Pittsburgh Penguins	Hextall	Series tied 2–2	W
5	April 25	7–10	@ Pittsburgh Penguins	Hextall	Penguins lead 3–2	L
6	April 27	6–2	Pittsburgh Penguins	Hextall	Series tied 3–3	W
7	April 29	4–1	@ Pittsburgh Penguins	Wregget	Flyers win 4–3	W

Wales Conference finals vs. Montreal Canadiens – Canadiens win 4–2

Game	Date	Score	Opponent	Decision	Series	Recap
1	May 1	3–1	@ Montreal Canadiens	Wregget	Flyers lead 1–0	W
2	May 3	0–3	@ Montreal Canadiens	Wregget	Series tied 1–1	L
3	May 5	1–5	Montreal Canadiens	Wregget	Canadiens lead 2–1	L
4	May 7	0–3	Montreal Canadiens	Hextall	Canadiens lead 3–1	L
5	May 9	2–1 OT	@ Montreal Canadiens	Hextall	Canadiens lead 3–2	W
6	May 11	2–4	Montreal Canadiens	Hextall	Canadiens win 4–2	L

Legend: W Win L Loss

== Player statistics ==
=== Scoring ===
- Position abbreviations: C = Center; D = Defense; G = Goaltender; LW = Left wing; RW = Right wing
- † = Joined team via a transaction (e.g., trade, waivers, signing) during the season. Stats reflect time with the Flyers only.
- ‡ = Left team via a transaction (e.g., trade, waivers, release) during the season. Stats reflect time with the Flyers only.

No.	Player	Pos	Regular season						Playoffs					
No.	Player	Pos	GP	G	A	Pts	+/-	PIM	GP	G	A	Pts	+/-	PIM
12	Tim Kerr	RW	69	48	40	88	−4	73	19	14	11	25	1	27
22	Rick Tocchet	RW	66	45	36	81	−1	183	16	6	6	12	0	69
26	Brian Propp	LW	77	32	46	78	16	37	18	14	9	23	8	14
9	Pelle Eklund	LW	79	18	51	69	5	23	19	3	8	11	−4	2
19	Scott Mellanby	RW	76	21	29	50	−13	183	19	4	5	9	2	28
10	Mike Bullard†	C	54	23	26	49	1	60	19	3	9	12	0	32
14	Ron Sutter	C	55	26	22	48	25	80	19	1	9	10	5	51
29	Terry Carkner	D	78	11	32	43	−6	149	19	1	5	6	−1	28
2	Mark Howe	D	52	9	29	38	7	45	19	0	15	15	14	10
32	Murray Craven	LW	51	9	28	37	4	52	1	0	0	0	−1	0
20	Dave Poulin	C	69	18	17	35	4	49	19	6	5	11	5	16
3	Gord Murphy	D	75	4	31	35	−3	68	19	2	7	9	0	13
24	Derrick Smith	LW	74	16	14	30	−4	43	19	5	2	7	3	12
7	Jay Wells	D	67	2	19	21	−3	184	18	0	2	2	−1	51
25	Peter Zezel‡	C	26	4	13	17	−13	15	—	—	—	—	—	—
28	Kjell Samuelsson	D	68	3	14	17	13	140	19	1	3	4	13	24
25	Keith Acton†	C	25	3	10	13	1	64	16	2	3	5	0	18
15 (Note: Sulliman wore number 38 in his first eight games.)	Doug Sulliman	RW	52	6	6	12	−8	8	4	0	0	0	0	0
8	Moe Mantha†	D	30	3	8	11	−5	33	1	0	0	0	0	0
5	Kerry Huffman	D	29	0	11	11	0	31	—	—	—	—	—	—
27	Ron Hextall	G	64	0	8	8		113	15	1	0	1		28
23	Ilkka Sinisalo	RW	13	1	6	7	6	2	8	1	1	2	−1	0
6	Jeff Chychrun	D	80	1	4	5	11	245	19	0	2	2	−3	65
33	Mark Laforest	G	17	0	4	4		4	—	—	—	—	—	—
17	Craig Berube	LW	53	1	1	2	−15	199	16	0	0	0	0	56
21	Dave Brown‡	RW	53	1	1	2	−8	199	—	—	—	—	—	—
10	Magnus Roupe‡	LW	7	1	1	2	1	10	—	—	—	—	—	—
42	Don Nachbaur	C	15	1	0	1	−1	37	—	—	—	—	—	—
21	Al Secord†	RW	20	1	0	1	−7	38	14	0	4	4	2	31
18	Brian Dobbin	RW	14	0	1	1	−6	8	2	0	0	0	0	17
39	David Fenyves	D	1	0	1	1	0	0	—	—	—	—	—	—
37	Mark Freer	C	5	0	1	1	0	0	—	—	—	—	—	—
11	Glen Seabrooke	C	3	0	1	1	−1	0	—	—	—	—	—	—
49	Marc D'Amour	G	1	0	0	0		0	—	—	—	—	—	—
34 (Note: Harding wore number 48 in his first game.)	Jeff Harding	RW	6	0	0	0	1	29	—	—	—	—	—	—
35	Ken Wregget†	G	3	0	0	0		0	5	0	0	0		16

=== Goaltending ===
- † = Joined team via a transaction (e.g., trade, waivers, signing) during the season. Stats reflect time with the Flyers only.
- ‡ = Left team via a transaction (e.g., trade, waivers, release) during the season. Stats reflect time with the Flyers only.

No.	Player	Regular season											Playoffs									
No.	Player	GP	GS	W	L	T	SA	GA	GAA	SV%	SO	TOI	GP	GS	W	L	SA	GA	GAA	SV%	SO	TOI
27	Ron Hextall	64	63	30	28	6	1855	202	3.23	.891	0	3,756	15	15	8	7	445	49	3.32	.890	0	886
33	Mark Laforest	17	15	5	7	2	497	64	4.12	.871	0	933	—	—	—	—	—	—	—	—	—	—
35	Ken Wregget†	3	2	1	1	0	73	13	6.01	.822	0	130	5	4	2	2	138	10	2.23	.928	0	268
49	Marc D'Amour	1	0	0	0	0	13	0	0.00	1.000	0	19	—	—	—	—	—	—	—	—	—	—

== Awards and records ==
=== Awards ===
Type	Award/honor	Recipient	Ref
League (annual)	Bill Masterton Memorial Trophy	Tim Kerr	
League (in-season)	NHL All-Star Game selection	Rick Tocchet	
League (in-season)	NHL Player of the Week	Tim Kerr (February 27)	
Team	Barry Ashbee Trophy	Kjell Samuelsson	
Team	Bobby Clarke Trophy	Ron Hextall	
Team	Class Guy Award	Ron Sutter	

=== Records ===
Among the team records set during the 1988–89 season was a trio of powerplay goal records on October 13. Brian Propp tied a team record by scoring three of the Flyers six powerplay goals in the game (also tied for the team record), including four overall by the team in the second period, which set the team record for a single period. From March 1 to March 19, Rick Tocchet scored a goal in a team record nine consecutive games. On March 7, Tim Kerr scored eight seconds into the start of a game, the fastest in team history. Ron Hextall set an NHL record for most penalty minutes (113) by a goaltender in a single season. The Flyers set a team record for most powerplay goals (98) and tied another for fewest shutouts (0).

During game five of the division final playoff series against the Pittsburgh Penguins, the Flyers allowed six goals during the first period, tying a team record, and ten goals during the game, setting a team record that was later tied. Pelle Eklund tied an NHL playoff record during the game for fastest goal from the start of a period, scoring six second into the second period. Kerr set team records for most goals (10), points (15), and powerplay goals (5) during the series. The Flyers also set records during the series for most shorthanded goals (4) and most penalties (94). In game one of the conference finals against the Montreal Canadiens, the Flyers tied a team record for most shorthanded goals scored (2).

Tim Kerr set a team record during the playoffs for most powerplay goals scored (8) while Mark Howe's 15 assists is a franchise high among defensemen. The seven shorthanded goals scored and 610 penalty minutes by the team are franchise playoff highs.

=== Milestones ===
Milestone	Player	Date	Ref
First game	Gord Murphy	October 6, 1988	
First game	Jeff Harding	December 6, 1988	

== Transactions ==
The Flyers were involved in the following transactions from May 27, 1988, the day after the deciding game of the 1988 Stanley Cup Final, through May 25, 1989, the day of the deciding game of the 1989 Stanley Cup Final.

=== Trades ===
Date	Details		Ref
June 21, 1988	To Philadelphia Flyers: Mike Stothers	To Toronto Maple Leafs: Bill Root	
July 25, 1988	To Philadelphia Flyers: Terry Carkner	To Quebec Nordiques: Greg Smyth; 3rd-round pick in 1989	
September 1, 1988	To Philadelphia Flyers: 3rd-round pick in 1990	To Pittsburgh Penguins: Wendell Young; 7th-round pick in 1990	
September 28, 1988	To Philadelphia Flyers: Chris Jensen	To New York Rangers: Michael Boyce	
September 29, 1988	To Philadelphia Flyers: Jay Wells	To Los Angeles Kings: Doug Crossman	
November 7, 1988	To Philadelphia Flyers: Scott Sandelin	To Montreal Canadiens: J. J. Daigneault	
November 29, 1988	To Philadelphia Flyers: Mike Bullard	To St. Louis Blues: Peter Zezel	
December 8, 1988	To Philadelphia Flyers: Moe Mantha	To Minnesota North Stars: Toronto's 5th-round pick in 1989	
December 10, 1988	To Philadelphia Flyers: Steven Fletcher	To Winnipeg Jets: Future considerations	
February 7, 1989	To Philadelphia Flyers: Al Secord	To Toronto Maple Leafs: 5th-round pick in 1989	
February 7, 1989	To Philadelphia Flyers: Keith Acton; 6th-round pick in 1991	To Edmonton Oilers: Dave Brown	
March 6, 1989	To Philadelphia Flyers: Ken Wregget	To Toronto Maple Leafs: 1st-round pick in 1989; Calgary's 1st-round pick in 1989	

=== Players acquired ===
Date	Player	Former team	Via	Ref
June 21, 1988	Jocelyn Perreault	Sherbrooke Canadiens (AHL)	Free agency	
September 30, 1988	Marc D'Amour	Salt Lake Golden Eagles (IHL)	Free agency	
October 3, 1988	Doug Sulliman	New Jersey Devils	Waiver draft	
May 16, 1989	Bill Armstrong	Western Michigan University (CCHA)	Free agency	

=== Players lost ===
Date	Player	New team	Via	Ref
June 21, 1988	Kevin McCarthy		Retirement	
July 14, 1988	Steve Smith	Calgary Flames	Free agency	
October 3, 1988	Brad Marsh	Toronto Maple Leafs	Waiver draft	
October 10, 1988	Nick Fotiu	Edmonton Oilers	Free agency	
1989	Magnus Roupe	Färjestad BK (Elitserien)	Release	
N/A	Willie Huber		Retirement (Note: Huber held out and retired after the season.)	

=== Signings ===
Date	Player	Term	Ref
July 25, 1988	Terry Carkner	3-year	
September 1, 1988	Jeff Harding		
September 1, 1988	Bruce Rendall		
September 12, 1988	Scott Mellanby	3-year	
September 12, 1988	Rick Tocchet	4-year	
September 27, 1988	Claude Boivin		
October 24, 1988	Tim Kerr	4-year	
March 7, 1989	Murray Baron		
May 19, 1989	Ilkka Sinisalo	2-year	

== Draft picks ==
=== NHL entry draft ===
Philadelphia's picks at the 1988 NHL entry draft, which was held at the Montreal Forum in Montreal, on June 11, 1988.

Round	Pick	Player	Position	Nationality	Team (league)	Notes
1	14	Claude Boivin	Left wing	Canada	Drummondville Voltigeurs (QMJHL)	
2	35	Pat Murray	Left wing	Canada	Michigan State University (CCHA)	
3	56	Craig Fisher	Left wing	Canada	Oshawa Legionaires (MetJHL)	
3	63	Dominic Roussel	Goaltender	Canada	Trois-Rivières Draveurs (QMJHL)	(Note: The Flyers traded Brad McCrimmon to the Calgary Flames for the Flames' third-round pick, 63rd overall, and the Flames' 1989 first-round pick on August 26, 1987.)
4	77	Scott LaGrand	Goaltender	United States	Hotchkiss School (Conn.)	
5	98	Edward O'Brien	Left wing	United States	Cushing Academy (Massachusetts)	
6	119	Gord Frantti	Defense	United States	Calumet High School (Mich.)	
7	140	Jamie Cooke	Right wing	Canada	Bramalea Blues (MetJHL)	
8	161	Johan Salle	Defense	Sweden	Malmö IF (Elitserien)	
9	182	Brian Arthur	Defense	Canada	Etobicoke Capitals (CJBHL)	
10	203	Jeff Dandreta	Right wing	United States	Cushing Academy (Massachusetts)	
11	224	Scott Billey	Right wing	United States	Madison Capitols (USHL)	
12	245	Dragomir Kadlec	Defense	Czechoslovakia	Dukla Jihlava (TCH)	

=== NHL supplemental draft ===
Philadelphia's picks at the 1988 NHL supplemental draft.

Round	Pick	Player	Position	Nationality	Team (league)
2	19	Paul Connell	Goaltender	United States	Bowling Green State University (CCHA)

== Farm teams ==
The Flyers were affiliated with the Hershey Bears of the AHL.
