= 1988–89 Pittsburgh Penguins season =

NHL team season

1988–89 Pittsburgh Penguins
- Division: 2nd Patrick
- Conference: 4th Wales
- 1988–89 record: 40–33–7
- Home record: 24–13–3
- Road record: 16–20–4
- Goals for: 347
- Goals against: 349

Team information
- General manager: Tony Esposito
- Coach: Gene Ubriaco
- Captain: Mario Lemieux
- Alternate captains: Paul Coffey; Randy Cunneyworth
- Arena: Pittsburgh Civic Arena

Team leaders
- Goals: Mario Lemieux (85)
- Assists: Mario Lemieux (114)
- Points: Mario Lemieux (199)
- Penalty minutes: Jay Caufield (285)
- Wins: Tom Barrasso (18)
- Goals against average: Tom Barrasso and Frank Pietrangelo (4.04)

The 1988–89 Pittsburgh Penguins season saw the Penguins finish in second place in the Patrick Division with a record of 40 wins, 33 losses, and 7 ties for 87 points. After a six-season drought, the Pittsburgh Penguins returned to the NHL playoffs; they swept the New York Rangers in the Division Semi-finals before losing the Division Finals in seven games to the Philadelphia Flyers.

== Regular season ==
This was Mario Lemieux's best season offensively. He led the league in goals (85), assists (114, tied with Wayne Gretzky), points (199), power-play goals (31) and set an NHL record for shorthanded goals (13).

The Penguins finished the regular season with the most power-play opportunities against, with 482, the most power-play opportunities, with 491, and the most power-play goals scored, with 119.

=== Highlights ===
- December 31, 1988 – Mario Lemieux scores five goals in an 8–6 win over the New Jersey Devils. Lemieux scores the five goals in five different ways: even strength, shorthanded, power play, penalty shot, and empty net.
- February 2, 1989 - The Penguins beat the Flyers 5-3 on the road, ending a 42-game winless streak in Philadelphia. Coincidentally, their previous win in Philadelphia, on January 20, 1974, was also by a 5-3 score.

=== Season standings ===
Patrick Division
	GP	W	L	T	GF	GA	Pts
**Washington Capitals**	80	41	29	10	305	259	92
**Pittsburgh Penguins**	80	40	33	7	347	349	87
**New York Rangers**	80	37	35	8	310	307	82
**Philadelphia Flyers**	80	36	36	8	307	285	80
New Jersey Devils	80	27	41	12	281	325	66
New York Islanders	80	28	47	5	265	325	61

Note: GP = Games played, W = Wins, L = Losses, T = Ties, Pts = Points, GF = Goals for, GA = Goals against
Note: Teams that qualified for the playoffs are highlighted in bold.

=== Record vs. opponents ===
==== Vs. Wales Conference ====
Vs. Patrick Division

1988–89 NHL records
Team	NJD	NYI	NYR	PHI	PIT	WSH	Total
New Jersey	—	1–4–2	4–3	2–5	1–4–2	4–3	12–19–4
N.Y. Islanders	4–1–2	—	2–5	1–5–1	2–4–1	3–4	12–19–4
N.Y. Rangers	3–4	5–2	—	3–3–1	3–3–1	3–2–2	17–14–4
Philadelphia	5–2	5–1–1	3–3–1	—	3–4	3–4	19–14–2
Pittsburgh	4–1–2	4–2–1	3–3–1	4–3	—	4–3	19–12–4
Washington	3–4	4–3	2–3–2	4–3	3–4	—	16–17–2

Vs. Adams Division

1988–89 NHL records
Team	BOS	BUF	HFD	MTL	QUE	Total
New Jersey	0–2–1	1–2	1–2	0–3	1–2	3–11–1
N.Y. Islanders	1–2	0–3	1–2	2–1	2–1	6–9–0
N.Y. Rangers	0–1–2	0–3	1–2	0–3	2–1	3–10–2
Philadelphia	1–2	2–1	1–1–1	0–1–2	2–1	6–6–3
Pittsburgh	1–1–1	1–2	1–2	1–2	1–2	5–9–1
Washington	1–1–1	3–0	3–0	1–1–1	2–0–1	10–2–3

==== Vs. Campbell Conference ====
Vs. Norris Division

1988–89 NHL records
Team	CHI	DET	MIN	STL	TOR	Total
New Jersey	2–1	2–0–1	1–1–1	2–1	2–1	9–4–2
N.Y. Islanders	0–3	0–3	2–1	1–2	1–2	4–11–0
N.Y. Rangers	2–0–1	0–3	2–1	3–0	1–1–1	8–5–2
Philadelphia	3–0	1–2	2–1	0–3	2–1	8–7–0
Pittsburgh	3–0	2–0–1	1–2	1–1–1	2–1	9–4–2
Washington	2–1	1–1–1	1–1–1	2–0–1	2–1	8–4–3

Vs. Smythe Division

1988–89 NHL records
Team	CGY	EDM	LAK	VAN	WIN	Total
New Jersey	0–3	2–1	0–1–2	1–1–1	0–1–2	3–7–5
N.Y. Islanders	0–2–1	1–2	1–2	2–1	2–1	6–8–1
N.Y. Rangers	1–2	1–2	2–1	3–0	2–1	9–6–0
Philadelphia	0–3	0–1–2	1–2	0–3	2–0–1	3–9–3
Pittsburgh	1–2	1–2	1–2	2–1	2–1	7–8–0
Washington	0–2–1	2–1	1–1–1	2–1	2–1	7–6–2

== Schedule and results ==
On January 4, 1989, the Penguins defeated the Red Army team 4–2 at the Civic Arena in an exhibition.

1988–89 regular season
October: 7–4–0 (home: 5–0–0; road: 2–4–0), 14 points

#	Oct	Time (ET)	Visitor	Score	Home	Location	Record	Points
1	Oct 7		Pittsburgh Penguins	6–4	Washington Capitals	Capital Centre	1–0–0	2
2	Oct 11		Washington Capitals	7–8	Pittsburgh Penguins	Civic Arena	2–0–0	4
3	Oct 12		Pittsburgh Penguins	5–8	Buffalo Sabres	Buffalo Memorial Auditorium	2–1–0	4
4	Oct 15		St. Louis Blues	2–9	Pittsburgh Penguins	Civic Arena	3–1–0	6
5	Oct 18		Philadelphia Flyers	2–4	Pittsburgh Penguins	Civic Arena	4–1–0	8
6	Oct 21		Pittsburgh Penguins	4–6	New Jersey Devils	Brendan Byrne Arena	4–2–0	8
7	Oct 22		Chicago Blackhawks	4–7	Pittsburgh Penguins	Civic Arena	5–2–0	10
8	Oct 25		Calgary Flames	1–6	Pittsburgh Penguins	Civic Arena	6–2–0	12
9	Oct 27		Pittsburgh Penguins	3–4	St. Louis Blues	St. Louis Arena	6–3–0	12
10	Oct 29		Pittsburgh Penguins	5–4	Montreal Canadiens	Montreal Forum	7–3–0	14
11	Oct 30		Pittsburgh Penguins	2–9	New York Rangers	Madison Square Garden (IV)	7–4–0	14

November: 7–6–0 (home: 5–2–0; road: 2–4–0), 14 points

#	Nov	Time (ET)	Visitor	Score	Home	Location	Record	Points
12	Nov 1		Vancouver Canucks	3–5	Pittsburgh Penguins	Civic Arena	8–4–0	16
13	Nov 3		Quebec Nordiques	6–2	Pittsburgh Penguins	Civic Arena	8–5–0	16
14	Nov 6		Pittsburgh Penguins	4–5	Philadelphia Flyers	The Spectrum	8–6–0	16
15	Nov 8		Edmonton Oilers	7–3	Pittsburgh Penguins	Civic Arena	8–7–0	16
16	Nov 10		Toronto Maple Leafs	1–5	Pittsburgh Penguins	Civic Arena	9–7–0	18
17	Nov 12		Pittsburgh Penguins	2–7	Los Angeles Kings	The Forum	9–8–0	18
18	Nov 13		Pittsburgh Penguins	4–2	Vancouver Canucks	Pacific Coliseum	10–8–0	20
19	Nov 16		Pittsburgh Penguins	5–8	Toronto Maple Leafs	Maple Leaf Gardens	10–9–0	20
20	Nov 19		Pittsburgh Penguins	3–6	New York Islanders	Nassau Veterans Memorial Coliseum	10–10–0	20
21	Nov 23		New York Rangers	2–8	Pittsburgh Penguins	Civic Arena	11–10–0	22
22	Nov 25		Pittsburgh Penguins	5–3	Washington Capitals	Capital Centre	12–10–0	24
23	Nov 26		Philadelphia Flyers	3–4	Pittsburgh Penguins	Civic Arena	13–10–0	26
24	Nov 30		Washington Capitals	4–6	Pittsburgh Penguins	Civic Arena	14–10–0	28

December: 9–2–3 (home: 6–1–1; road: 3–1–2), 21 points

#	Dec	Time (ET)	Visitor	Score	Home	Location	Record	Points
25	Dec 3		New York Islanders	2–4	Pittsburgh Penguins	Civic Arena	15–10–0	30
26	Dec 4		Pittsburgh Penguins	3–3 OT	Boston Bruins	Boston Garden	15–10–1	31
27	Dec 6		Chicago Blackhawks	6–7	Pittsburgh Penguins	Civic Arena	16–10–1	33
28	Dec 8		Pittsburgh Penguins	3–4	Philadelphia Flyers	The Spectrum	16–11–1	33
29	Dec 10		New Jersey Devils	4–4 OT	Pittsburgh Penguins	Civic Arena	16–11–2	34
30	Dec 14		Los Angeles Kings	4–5	Pittsburgh Penguins	Civic Arena	17–11–2	36
31	Dec 15		Pittsburgh Penguins	8–2	New York Islanders	Nassau Veterans Memorial Coliseum	18–11–2	38
32	Dec 17		Detroit Red Wings	2–3	Pittsburgh Penguins	Civic Arena	19–11–2	40
33	Dec 20		New York Islanders	3–5	Pittsburgh Penguins	Civic Arena	20–11–2	42
34	Dec 21		Pittsburgh Penguins	6–1	Toronto Maple Leafs	Maple Leaf Gardens	21–11–2	44
35	Dec 23		Pittsburgh Penguins	2–2 OT	New Jersey Devils	Brendan Byrne Arena	21–11–3	45
36	Dec 26		Pittsburgh Penguins	4–3 OT	Hartford Whalers	Hartford Civic Center	22–11–3	47
37	Dec 29		Philadelphia Flyers	3–2	Pittsburgh Penguins	Civic Arena	22–12–3	47
38	Dec 31		New Jersey Devils	6–8	Pittsburgh Penguins	Civic Arena	23–12–3	49

January: 5–6–1 (home: 3–2–1; road: 2–4–0), 11 points

#	Jan	Time (ET)	Visitor	Score	Home	Location	Record	Points
39	Jan 2		Pittsburgh Penguins	0–8	Washington Capitals	Capital Centre	23–13–3	49
40	Jan 7		Vancouver Canucks	7–5	Pittsburgh Penguins	Civic Arena	23–14–3	49
41	Jan 10		New York Islanders	3–5	Pittsburgh Penguins	Civic Arena	24–14–3	51
42	Jan 12		Pittsburgh Penguins	9–2	Minnesota North Stars	Met Center	25–14–3	53
43	Jan 14		New York Rangers	4–4 OT	Pittsburgh Penguins	Civic Arena	25–14–4	54
44	Jan 15		Pittsburgh Penguins	4–6	New York Rangers	Madison Square Garden (IV)	25–15–4	54
45	Jan 17		Pittsburgh Penguins	2–5	New York Islanders	Nassau Veterans Memorial Coliseum	25–16–4	54
46	Jan 20		Pittsburgh Penguins	3–7	Winnipeg Jets	Winnipeg Arena	25–17–4	54
47	Jan 21		Pittsburgh Penguins	7–4	Edmonton Oilers	Northlands Coliseum	26–17–4	56
48	Jan 25		Winnipeg Jets	4–5	Pittsburgh Penguins	Civic Arena	27–17–4	58
49	Jan 28		Detroit Red Wings	5–10	Pittsburgh Penguins	Civic Arena	28–17–4	60
50	Jan 31		Montreal Canadiens	5–1	Pittsburgh Penguins	Civic Arena	28–18–4	60

February: 4–7–3 (home: 2–2–1; road: 2–3–2), 11 points

#	Feb	Time (ET)	Visitor	Score	Home	Location	Record	Points
51	Feb 2		Pittsburgh Penguins	5–3	Philadelphia Flyers	The Spectrum	29–18–4	62
52	Feb 3		St. Louis Blues	3–3 OT	Pittsburgh Penguins	Civic Arena	29–18–5	63
53	Feb 5		Pittsburgh Penguins	5–2	Boston Bruins	Boston Garden	30–18–5	65
54	Feb 9		Quebec Nordiques	2–5	Pittsburgh Penguins	Civic Arena	31–18–5	67
55	Feb 11		Pittsburgh Penguins	1–8	Quebec Nordiques	Colisée de Québec	31–19–5	67
56	Feb 12		Calgary Flames	4–2	Pittsburgh Penguins	Civic Arena	31–20–5	67
57	Feb 14		Buffalo Sabres	3–7	Pittsburgh Penguins	Civic Arena	32–20–5	69
58	Feb 17		Pittsburgh Penguins	1–5	Buffalo Sabres	Buffalo Memorial Auditorium	32–21–5	69
59	Feb 18		New York Rangers	5–3	Pittsburgh Penguins	Civic Arena	32–22–5	69
60	Feb 21		Minnesota North Stars	2–1	Pittsburgh Penguins	Civic Arena	32–23–5	69
61	Feb 23		Pittsburgh Penguins	6–6 OT	Detroit Red Wings	Joe Louis Arena	32–23–6	70
62	Feb 25		Pittsburgh Penguins	5–5 OT	New York Islanders	Nassau Veterans Memorial Coliseum	32–23–7	71
63	Feb 26		Pittsburgh Penguins	6–8	Hartford Whalers	Hartford Civic Center	32–24–7	71

March: 6–9–0 (home: 2–5–0; road: 4–4–0), 12 points

#	Mar	Time (ET)	Visitor	Score	Home	Location	Record	Points
64	Mar 1		New Jersey Devils	1–4	Pittsburgh Penguins	Civic Arena	33–24–7	73
65	Mar 3		Pittsburgh Penguins	2–4	Washington Capitals	Capital Centre	33–25–7	73
66	Mar 5		Edmonton Oilers	4–2	Pittsburgh Penguins	Civic Arena	33–26–7	73
67	Mar 7		Pittsburgh Penguins	2–3 OT	Los Angeles Kings	Great Western Forum	33–27–7	73
68	Mar 9		Pittsburgh Penguins	3–10	Calgary Flames	Olympic Saddledome	33–28–7	73
69	Mar 10		Pittsburgh Penguins	5–1	Winnipeg Jets	Winnipeg Arena	34–28–7	75
70	Mar 12		Pittsburgh Penguins	6–5	Chicago Blackhawks	Chicago Stadium	35–28–7	77
71	Mar 14		Boston Bruins	8–2	Pittsburgh Penguins	Civic Arena	35–29–7	77
72	Mar 16		Pittsburgh Penguins	2–1	New Jersey Devils	Brendan Byrne Arena	36–29–7	79
73	Mar 18		Montreal Canadiens	7–2	Pittsburgh Penguins	Civic Arena	36–30–7	79
74	Mar 20		Pittsburgh Penguins	2–7	Minnesota North Stars	Met Center	36–31–7	79
75	Mar 22		Washington Capitals	5–4	Pittsburgh Penguins	Civic Arena	36–32–7	79
76	Mar 25		New Jersey Devils	4–5	Pittsburgh Penguins	Civic Arena	37–32–7	81
77	Mar 26		Pittsburgh Penguins	6–4	New York Rangers	Madison Square Garden (IV)	38–32–7	83
78	Mar 30		Hartford Whalers	9–5	Pittsburgh Penguins	Civic Arena	38–33–7	83

April: 2–0–0 (home: 1–0–0; road: 1–0–0), 4 points

#	Apr	Time (ET)	Visitor	Score	Home	Location	Record	Points
79	Apr 1		New York Rangers	2–5	Pittsburgh Penguins	Civic Arena	39–33–7	85
80	Apr 2		Pittsburgh Penguins	6–5 OT	Philadelphia Flyers	The Spectrum	40–33–7	87

Legend: Win (2 points) Loss (0 points) Tie (1 point)

== Playoffs ==
After six frustrating and disappointing seasons, the Penguins finally managed to get into the playoffs for the first time since the 1981–82 season. They swept New York Rangers in the Semifinals, but lost to their rivals, the Philadelphia Flyers in seven games.

=== Playoff log ===
1989 Stanley Cup playoffs
Patrick Division semifinals vs No. 3 New York Rangers: 4–0 (home: 2–0; road: 2–0)

#	Date	Visitor	Score	Home	OT	PIT goals	NYR goals	Decision	Attendance	Series	Recap
1	April 5	N.Y. Rangers	1–3	Pittsburgh		Coffey (2), Quinn	Sandstrom	Barrasso (1–0)	16,025	1–0	
2	April 6	N.Y. Rangers	4–7	Pittsburgh		Stevens, Brown, Callander, Bourque, Cunneyworth, Zalapski, Lemieux (en)	Lafleur, Leetch, Ogrodnick, Wilson	Barrasso (2–0)	16,025	2–0	
3	April 8	Pittsburgh	5–3	N.Y. Rangers		Lemeiux, Cullen, Stevens, Quinn (2)	Granato, Ogrodnick, Sandstrom	Barrasso (3–0)	17,498	3–0	
4	April 9	Pittsburgh	4–3	N.Y. Rangers		Lemieux, Bourque, Brown	Sandstrom, Leetch (2)	Barrasso (4–0)	17,403	4–0	

Patrick Division finals vs No. 4 Philadelphia Flyers: 3–4 (home: 2–2; road: 1–2)

#	Date	Visitor	Score	Home	OT	PIT goals	PHI goals	Decision	Attendance	Series	Recap
1	April 17	Philadelphia	3–4	Pittsburgh		Lemieux, Quinn, Cullen, Brown	Poulin, Kerr, Propp	Barrasso (5–0)	16,025	1–0	
2	April 19	Philadelphia	4–2	Pittsburgh		Quinn, Lemieux	Kerr (3), Propp	Barrasso (5–1)	16,025	1–1	
3	April 21	Pittsburgh	4–3	Philadelphia	12:08	Lemieux, Quinn, Callander, Bourque	Poulin, Acton, Propp	Barrasso (6–1)	17,423	2–1	
4	April 23	Pittsburgh	1–4	Philadelphia		Cullen	Poulin, Kerr (2), Carkner	Barrasso (6–2)	17,423	2–2	
5	April 25	Philadelphia	7–10	Pittsburgh		Lemieux (3), Errey, Lemieux, Loney, Stevens, Brown (2), Lemieux (en)	Bullard, Eklund, Propp, Smith, Kerr, Eklund, Kerr	Barrasso (7–2)	16,025	3–2	
6	April 27	Pittsburgh	2–6	Philadelphia		Cunneyworth (2)	Kerr (2), Smith, Sutter, Smith, Propp	Barrasso (7–3)	17,423	3–3	
7	April 29	Philadelphia	4–1	Pittsburgh		Lemieux	Propp, Poulin, Bullard, Mellanby (en)	Barrasso (7–4)	16,025	3–4	

Legend: Win Loss

== Player statistics ==
Skaters

Regular season
Player	GP	G	A	Pts	+/−	PIM
Mario Lemieux	76	85	114	199	41	100
Rob Brown	68	49	66	115	27	118
Paul Coffey	75	30	83	113	–10	195
Dan Quinn	79	34	60	94	–37	102
Bob Errey	76	26	32	58	40	124
John Cullen	79	12	37	49	–25	112
Zarley Zalapski	58	12	33	45	9	57
Randy Cunneyworth	70	25	19	44	–22	156
Phil Bourque	80	17	26	43	–22	97
Dave Hannan	72	10	20	30	–12	157
Randy Hillier	68	1	23	24	–4	141
Troy Loney	69	10	6	16	–5	165
Jim Johnson	76	2	14	16	7	163
Kevin Stevens	24	12	3	15	–8	19
Jock Callander	30	6	5	11	–3	20
Steve Dykstra	65	1	6	7	–12	126
Dan Frawley	46	3	4	7	–1	66
Rod Buskas	52	1	5	6	–2	105
Chris Dahlquist	43	1	5	6	–8	42
Jay Caufield	58	1	4	5	–4	285
Doug Bodger^{‡}	10	1	4	5	6	7
Scott Bjugstad	24	3	0	3	–12	4
Gord Dineen^{†}	38	1	2	3	–5	44
Dave McLlwain	24	1	2	3	–11	4
Mark Recchi	15	1	1	2	–2	0
Mark Kachowski	12	1	1	2	1	43
Ville Sirén^{‡}	12	1	0	1	0	14
Perry Ganchar	3	0	0	0	–3	0
Richard Zemlak^{†}	31	0	0	0	–4	135
Total		347	575	922	—	2,601

Playoffs
Player	GP	G	A	Pts	+/−	PIM
Mario Lemieux	11	12	7	19	–1	16
Paul Coffey	11	2	13	15	–7	31
Kevin Stevens	11	3	7	10	–1	16
Dan Quinn	11	6	3	9	–6	10
Zarley Zalapski	11	1	8	9	–2	13
John Cullen	11	3	6	9	4	28
Rob Brown	11	5	3	8	–2	22
Randy Cunneyworth	11	3	5	8	–1	26
Jock Callander	10	2	5	7	6	10
Phil Bourque	11	4	1	5	2	66
Jim Johnson	11	0	5	5	7	44
Troy Loney	11	1	3	4	3	24
Bob Errey	11	1	2	3	1	12
Gord Dineen	11	0	2	2	8	8
Dave Hannan	8	0	1	1	0	4
Dave McLlwain	3	0	1	1	0	0
Randy Hillier	9	0	1	1	–1	49
Jay Caufield	9	0	0	0	–2	28
Rod Buskas	10	0	0	0	–1	23
Richard Zemlak	1	0	0	0	0	10
Steve Dykstra	1	0	0	0	0	2
Chris Dahlquist	2	0	0	0	0	0
Total		43	73	116	—	442

Goaltenders

Regular Season
Player	GP	TOI	W	L	T	GA	GAA	SA	SV%	SO	G	A	PIM
Tom Barrasso^{†}	44	2406:21	18	15	7	162	4.04	1441	0.888	0	0	5	49
Wendell Young	22	1150:18	12	9	0	92	4.80	673	0.863	0	0	2	4
Steve Guenette	11	573:53	5	6	0	41	4.29	308	0.867	0	0	1	0
Frank Pietrangelo	15	669:20	5	3	0	45	4.03	408	0.890	0	0	0	2
Rick Tabaracci	1	33:05	0	0	0	4	7.25	21	0.810	0	0	0	2
Total		4832:57	40	33	7	344	4.27	2851	0.879	0	0	8	57

Playoffs
Player	GP	TOI	W	L	T	GA	GAA	SA	SV%	SO	G	A	PIM
Tom Barrasso	11	631:10	7	4	0	40	3.80	388	0.897	0	0	1	8
Wendell Young	1	38:38	0	0	0	1	1.55	11	0.909	0	0	0	0
Total		669:48	7	4	0	41	3.68	399	0.897	0	0	1	8

^{†}Denotes player spent time with another team before joining the Penguins. Stats reflect time with the Penguins only.
^{‡}Denotes player was traded mid-season. Stats reflect time with the Penguins only.

== Awards and records ==
- Paul Coffey, Defence, NHL First All-Star Team
- Mario Lemieux, Center, NHL First All-Star Team
- Mario Lemieux, Art Ross Trophy
- Mario Lemieux, Center, NHL First All-Star Team
- Mario Lemieux became the first person to score 100 assists in a season for the Penguins. He did so in a 6–8 loss to Hartford on February 26.
- Mario Lemieux became the first person to score 170 points in a season for the Penguins. He did so in a 2–3 loss to Los Angeles on March 7.
- Mario Lemieux became the first person to score 180 points in a season for the Penguins. He did so in a 2–8 loss to Boston on March 14.
- Mario Lemieux became the first person to score 110 assists in a season for the Penguins. He did so in a 2–7 loss to Minnesota on March 20.
- Mario Lemieux became the first person to score 190 points in a season for the Penguins. He did so in a 6–4 win over New York on March 27.
- Mario Lemieux became the first person to score 80 goals in a season for the Penguins. He did so in a 5–9 loss to Hartford on March 30.
- Mario Lemieux became the first person to score 400 assists for the Penguins. He did so in a 6–8 loss to Hartford on February 26.
- Mario Lemieux became the first person to score 700 points for the Penguins. He did so in a 4–5 loss to Washington on March 22.
- Mario Lemieux established a new franchise record for goals (85), assists (114) and points (199) in a season. He had set all three records the previous season.
- Mario Lemieux established a new franchise record for assists (415) and points (715). He broke the previous records of 349 assists (Syl Apps Jr.) and 636 points (Rick Kehoe)
- Paul Coffey established a new franchise record for goals (30), assists (83) and points (113) in a season by a defenseman. He broke the records of 16 goals, 67 assists and 83 points all set by Randy Carlyle in 1981.
- Rod Buskas established a new franchise record for penalty minutes (946). He broke the previous records of 871 PIM held by Bryan Watson.
- Mario Lemieux established a new franchise record for highest plus-minus in a season (+41). He broke the previous high of +36 set by Lowell MacDonald in 1973.
- Mario Lemieux, NHL Record, Most Shorthanded Goals, One Season (13)

== Transactions ==
=== Trades ===
September 1, 1988	To Philadelphia Flyers 1990 3rd round pick	To Pittsburgh Penguins Wendell Young; 1990 7th round pick
October 3, 1988	To Buffalo Sabres Wayne Van Dorp	To Pittsburgh Penguins 1990 7th round pick
November 1, 1988	To Minnesota North Stars rights to Rob Gaudreau	To Pittsburgh Penguins Richard Zemlak
November 12, 1988	To Buffalo Sabres Doug Bodger; Darrin Shannon	To Pittsburgh Penguins Tom Barrasso; 1990 3rd round pick
December 17, 1988	To Minnesota North Stars Steve Gotaas; Ville Siren	To Pittsburgh Penguins Scott Bjugstad; Gord Dineen
January 9, 1989	To Calgary Flames Steve Guenette	To Pittsburgh Penguins 1989 6th round pick
March 6, 1989	To Los Angeles Kings Pat Mayer	To Pittsburgh Penguins Tim Tookey

=== Free agents lost ===
Date	Player	New team
October 4, 1988	Carl Mokosak	Boston Bruins

=== Waiver draft ===
Date	Player	Former team
October 3, 1988	Jay Caufield	Minnesota North Stars
October 3, 1988	Steve Dykstra; Dave Hannan	Edmonton Oilers

=== Player signings ===
Player	Date	Contract terms
John Cullen	June 21, 1988	Unknown
Mark Recchi	August 17, 1988	Multi-year contract
Steve Guenette	August 29, 1988	Multi-year contract
Darrin Shannon	September 7, 1988	Multi-year contract
Bruce Racine	September 21, 1988	Multi-year contract
Mario Lemieux	November 1, 1988	1 year/$1.6 million
Dan Quinn	November 5, 1988	Multi-year contract
Jamie Leach	March 22, 1989	Multi-year contract
Dave Michayluk	May 24, 1989	Unknown

=== Other ===
Player	Date	Details
Pierre Creamer	June 14, 1988	Replaced as head coach
Gene Ubriaco	June 28, 1988	Hired as head coach
Dave Hunter	October 3, 1988	Sent to Oilers as compensation for claiming Dave Hannan in waiver draft

== Draft picks ==
Pittsburgh Penguins' picks at the 1988 NHL entry draft.

Round	#	Player	Pos	Nationality	College/Junior/Club team (League)
1	4	Darrin Shannon	L	Canada	Windsor Compuware Spitfires (OHL)
2	25	Mark Major	L	Canada	North Bay Centennials (OHL)
3	62^{[a]}	Daniel Gauthier	L	Canada	Victoriaville Tigres (QMJHL)
4	67	Mark Recchi	R	Canada	Kamloops Blazers (WHL)
5	88	Greg Andrusak	D	Canada	U. of Minnesota-Duluth (NCAA)
7	130	Troy Mick	L	Canada	Portland Winter Hawks (WHL)
8	151	Jeffrey Blaeser	L	United States	St. John's Prep (Mass H.S.)
9	172	Robert Gaudreau	C	United States	Bishop Hendricken H.S. (RI)
10	193	Donald Pancoe	L	Canada	Hamilton Steelhawks (OHL)
11	214	Cory Laylin	L	United States	St. Cloud Apollo H.S. (Minn.)
12	235	Darren Stolk	D	Canada	Lethbridge Broncos (WHL)
S	4	Paul Polillo	C	Canada	Western Michigan University (CCHA)
S	9	Shawn Lillie	C	Canada	Colgate University (ECAC)

Draft notes

- The Pittsburgh Penguins' third-round pick went to the Montreal Canadiens as the result of a December 17, 1987, trade that sent Perry Ganchar and future considerations (1988 third-round pick (#62-Daniel Gauthier)) to the Penguins in exchange for a future considerations (this pick).
- ^{a} The Montreal Canadiens' third-round pick went to the Pittsburgh Penguins as a result of a December 17, 1987, trade that sent future considerations (1988 third-round pick (#46-Neil Carnes)) to the Canadiens in exchange for Perry Ganchar and future considerations (this pick).
- The Pittsburgh Penguins' sixth-round pick went to the Los Angeles Kings as the result of a February 4, 1988, trade that sent Bryan Erickson to the Penguins in exchange for Chris Kontos and future considerations (this pick).
