= Al Tuer =

Canadian ice hockey player

- Born: July 19, 1963 (age 63) North Battleford, Saskatchewan, Canada
- Height: 6 ft 0 in (183 cm)
- Weight: 189 lb (86 kg; 13 st 7 lb)
- Position: Defenceman
- Shot: Left
- Played for: Hartford Whalers; Minnesota North Stars; Los Angeles Kings
- NHL draft: 186th overall, 1981; Los Angeles Kings
- Playing career: 1983–1993

Allan Tuer (born July 19, 1963) is a professional scout for the New York Rangers of the National Hockey League (NHL). He was a professional ice hockey defenceman who was drafted by the Los Angeles Kings in the 9th round (186th overall) of the 1981 NHL entry draft.

As a player he was known for his rough style of play. He holds the Regina Pats single season record for penalty minutes, and the New Haven Nighthawks all-time penalty minute record.

After retiring he has served as the general manager and head coach of the Moose Jaw Warriors, scout for the NHL Central Scouting Bureau, amateur scout for Calgary Flames, professional scout/director of pro scouting for Florida Panthers, and is currently a professional scout for the New York Rangers.

== Career statistics ==
=== Regular season and playoffs ===
			Regular season					Playoffs
Season	Team	League	GP	G	A	Pts	PIM	GP	G	A	Pts	PIM
1980–81	Regina Pats	WHL	31	0	7	7	58	8	0	1	1	37
1980–81	Regina Pat Blues	SJHL	45	6	35	41	215	—	—	—	—	—
1981–82	Regina Pats	WHL	63	2	18	20	486	13	0	3	3	117
1982–83	Regina Pats	WHL	71	3	27	30	229	5	0	0	0	37
1983–84	New Haven Nighthawks	AHL	78	0	20	20	195	—	—	—	—	—
1984–85	New Haven Nighthawks	AHL	56	0	7	7	241	—	—	—	—	—
1985–86	Los Angeles Kings	NHL	45	0	1	1	150	—	—	—	—	—
1985–86	New Haven Nighthawks	AHL	8	1	0	1	53	—	—	—	—	—
1986–87	Nova Scotia Oilers	AHL	69	1	14	15	273	5	0	1	1	48
1987–88	Minnesota North Stars	NHL	6	1	0	1	29	—	—	—	—	—
1987–88	Kalamazoo Wings	IHL	68	2	15	17	303	7	0	0	0	34
1988–89	Hartford Whalers	NHL	4	0	0	0	23	—	—	—	—	—
1988–89	Binghamton Whalers	AHL	43	1	7	8	234	—	—	—	—	—
1989–90	Hartford Whalers	NHL	2	0	0	0	6	—	—	—	—	—
1989–90	Binghamton Whalers	AHL	58	3	7	10	176	—	—	—	—	—
1990–91	San Diego Gulls	IHL	60	0	5	5	305	—	—	—	—	—
1991–92	New Haven Nighthawks	AHL	68	2	10	12	199	4	0	1	1	12
1992–93	Cincinnati Cyclones	IHL	52	1	9	10	248	—	—	—	—	—
1992–93	Cleveland Lumberjacks	IHL	13	1	4	5	29	2	0	0	0	4
NHL totals			57	1	1	2	208	—	—	—	—	—
