= Jeff Harding (ice hockey) =

Canadian ice hockey player

- Born: April 6, 1969 (age 57) Toronto, Ontario, Canada
- Height: 6 ft 3 in (191 cm)
- Weight: 220 lb (100 kg; 15 st 10 lb)
- Position: Right wing
- Shot: Right
- Played for: Philadelphia Flyers
- National team: Canada
- NHL draft: 30th overall, 1987; Philadelphia Flyers
- Playing career: 1988–1992

Jeffrey James Harding (born April 6, 1969) is a Canadian retired professional ice hockey forward. He played in the National Hockey League (NHL) for the Philadelphia Flyers during the 1988,89,90 NHL seasons. Harding also played in the Minnesota North Stars organization retiring in 1992.

== Early life ==
A native of Toronto Ontario. Canada, Harding played junior hockey with the St. Michael's Buzzers and Henry Carr Crusaders. Harding was a product of the Canadian Development Program and the Canadian National Team.

== Career ==
Harding was selected 30th overall (2nd round) by the Philadelphia Flyers in the 1987 NHL entry draft.

After his freshman season at Michigan State University, where the Spartans competed in the NCAA Tournament and Harding tallied 17 goals and 129 penalty minutes, he signed a multi-year contract with the Philadelphia Flyers of the National Hockey League. Harding was under contract in Philadelphia from 1988, 1989, and 1990 but suffered a severe knee injury fracturing his patella bone and severed several tendons.

Following his time in Philadelphia he played for the Canadian National Team competing in the Spengler Cup and Izvestia cup in Europe. The forward was signed by the Minnesota North Stars splitting the season between the American Hockey League and International Hockey League.

Harding is second in the all-time Michigan State Spartan record books with 62 penalties in a single season, third with 129 penalty minutes in a single season, tied for first with three goals in a single period.

Harding has been a high school teacher since 1995. He teaches health and physical education at Central Bucks High School East in Pennsylvania. Harding was awarded the NFHCA Coach of the Year after winning numerous league and district titles and a State Championship in 2002. Harding developed and operated the Total Hockey Training and Development Program and the True North Hockey Club.

== Career statistics ==
=== Regular season and playoffs ===
			Regular season					Playoffs
Season	Team	League	GP	G	A	Pts	PIM	GP	G	A	Pts	PIM
1985–86	Henry Carr Crusaders	MetJBHL	23	14	10	24	30	—	—	—	—	—
1986–87	St. Michael's Buzzers	MetJBHL	22	22	8	30	97	—	—	—	—	—
1987–88	Michigan State University	CCHA	43	17	10	27	129	—	—	—	—	—
1988–89	Philadelphia Flyers	NHL	6	0	0	0	29	—	—	—	—	—
1988–89	Hershey Bears	AHL	34	13	5	18	64	8	1	1	2	33
1989–90	Philadelphia Flyers	NHL	9	0	0	0	18	—	—	—	—	—
1989–90	Hershey Bears	AHL	6	0	2	2	2	—	—	—	—	—
1989–90	Canadian National Team	Intl	21	5	6	11	50	—	—	—	—	—
1990–91	Cape Breton Oilers	AHL	4	1	0	1	2	—	—	—	—	—
1990–91	Fort Wayne Komets	IHL	11	3	4	7	10	—	—	—	—	—
1991–92	Springfield Indians	AHL	17	1	4	5	27	—	—	—	—	—
1991–92	Kalamazoo Wings	IHL	6	1	0	1	63	—	—	—	—	—
NHL totals			15	0	0	0	47	—	—	—	—	—
