= Marc D'Amour =

Canadian ice hockey player

- Born: May 29, 1961 (age 63); Sudbury, Ontario, Canada
- Height: 5 ft 10 in (178 cm)
- Weight: 165 lb (75 kg; 11 st 11 lb)
- Position: Goaltender
- Caught: Left
- Played for: Calgary Flames; Philadelphia Flyers
- National team: Canada
- NHL draft: Undrafted
- Playing career: 1982–1992

Marc G. D'Amour (born May 29, 1961) is a Canadian retired professional ice hockey goaltender. He played 16 games in the National Hockey League (NHL) for the Calgary Flames and Philadelphia Flyers during the 1985–86 and 1988–89 seasons. The rest of his career, which lasted from 1982 to 1992, was spent in the minor leagues.

== Playing career ==
D'Amour played four seasons of junior hockey with the Sault Ste. Marie Greyhounds between 1978 and 1982 before signing as a free agent with the Flames. After bouncing around the Flames minor league system, he earned his first call-up to the NHL in 1985–86. He played 15 games with the Flames but after posting only two victories, lost his job to Mike Vernon. He played one game for the Flyers in 1988–89, but otherwise remained in the minor leagues until he retired in 1992.

== Career statistics ==
=== Regular season and playoffs ===
			Regular season									Playoffs
Season	Team	League	GP	W	L	T	MIN	GA	SO	GAA	SV%	GP	W	L	MIN	GA	SO	GAA	SV%
1978–79	Sault Ste. Marie Greyhounds	OMJHL	30	—	—	—	1501	149	0	5.96	—	—	—	—	—	—	—	—	—
1979–80	Sault Ste. Marie Greyhounds	OMJHL	33	6	15	0	1429	117	0	4.91	—	—	—	—	—	—	—	—	—
1980–81	Sault Ste. Marie Greyhounds	OHL	16	7	1	1	653	38	0	3.49	—	14	5	4	683	41	0	3.60	—
1981–82	Sault Ste. Marie Greyhounds	OHL	46	28	12	1	2384	130	1	3.27	—	10	3	2	504	30	0	3.57	—
1982–83	Colorado Flames	CHL	42	16	21	2	2373	153	1	3.87	—	1	0	1	59	4	0	4.08	—
1983–84	Colorado Flames	CHL	36	18	12	1	1917	131	0	4.10	—	1	0	0	20	0	0	0.00	1.000
1984–85	Moncton Golden Flames	AHL	37	18	14	2	2051	115	0	3.36	—	—	—	—	—	—	—	—	—
1984–85	Salt Lake Golden Eagles	IHL	12	7	2	2	694	33	0	2.85	—	—	—	—	—	—	—	—	—
1985–86	Calgary Flames	NHL	15	2	4	2	560	32	0	3.43	.897	—	—	—	—	—	—	—	—
1985–86	Moncton Golden Flames	AHL	21	6	9	1	1129	72	0	3.83	—	5	1	4	296	20	0	4.05	—
1986–87	Binghamton Whalers	AHL	8	5	3	0	461	30	0	3.90	—	—	—	—	—	—	—	—	—
1986–87	Salt Lake Golden Eagles	IHL	10	3	6	0	523	37	0	4.24	—	—	—	—	—	—	—	—	—
1986–87	Canadian National Team	Intl	1	0	0	0	30	4	0	8.00	—	—	—	—	—	—	—	—	—
1987–88	Salt Lake Golden Eagles	IHL	62	26	19	5	3245	177	0	3.27	—	19	12	7	1123	67	0	3.58	—
1988–89	Philadelphia Flyers	NHL	1	0	0	0	20	0	0	0.00	1.000	—	—	—	—	—	—	—	—
1988–89	Hershey Bears	AHL	39	19	13	3	2174	127	0	3.51	—	—	—	—	—	—	—	—	—
1988–89	Indianapolis Ice	IHL	6	2	3	0	324	20	0	3.70	—	—	—	—	—	—	—	—	—
1989–90	Hershey Bears	AHL	43	15	20	6	2505	148	2	3.54	—	—	—	—	—	—	—	—	—
1990–91	Hershey Bears	AHL	28	10	8	4	1331	80	0	3.61	—	2	0	1	80	5	0	3.75	—
1990–91	Fort Wayne Komets	IHL	3	1	0	0	136	9	0	3.97	—	—	—	—	—	—	—	—	—
1991–92	Hershey Bears	AHL	21	9	8	2	1073	79	0	4.42	—	—	—	—	—	—	—	—	—
AHL totals			197	82	75	20	10,724	651	2	3.64	—	7	1	5	386	25	0	3.99	—
IHL totals			93	39	30	7	4922	276	0	3.36	—	19	12	7	1123	67	0	3.58	—
NHL totals			16	2	4	2	579	32	0	3.32	.901	—	—	—	—	—	—	—	—
