= Jim Hofford =

Canadian ice hockey player

- Born: October 4, 1964 (age 61) Sudbury, Ontario, Canada
- Height: 6 ft 0 in (183 cm)
- Weight: 188 lb (85 kg; 13 st 6 lb)
- Position: Defence
- Shot: Right
- Played for: Buffalo Sabres; Los Angeles Kings
- NHL draft: 114th overall, 1983; Buffalo Sabres
- Playing career: 1984–1990

James Hofford (born October 4, 1964) is a former professional ice hockey defenceman. Born in Sudbury, Ontario, Hofford was drafted in the sixth round, 114th overall, by the Buffalo Sabres in the 1983 NHL entry draft. He played eighteen games in the National Hockey League: seventeen with the Sabres and one with the Los Angeles Kings. He was scoreless for his NHL career, but is a member of the Rochester Americans hall of fame.

Hofford became the general manager of The Mall at Greece Ridge in 1998, a position he held for several years.

== Career statistics ==
| | | | Regular season | | | | | Playoffs |
| Season | Team | League | GP | G | A | Pts | PIM | GP | G | A | Pts | PIM |
|---|---|---|---|---|---|---|---|---|---|---|---|---|
| 1980–81 | Sudbury Nickel Capital Wolves | GNML | 52 | 18 | 39 | 57 | 94 | — | — | — | — | — |
| 1981–82 | Windsor Spitfires | OHL | 67 | 5 | 9 | 14 | 214 | 9 | 0 | 3 | 3 | 22 |
| 1982–83 | Windsor Spitfires | OHL | 63 | 8 | 20 | 28 | 171 | 3 | 0 | 1 | 1 | 15 |
| 1983–84 | Windsor Spitfires | OHL | 1 | 0 | 0 | 0 | 2 | — | — | — | — | — |
| 1984–85 | Rochester Americans | AHL | 70 | 2 | 13 | 15 | 166 | 5 | 0 | 0 | 0 | 16 |
| 1985–86 | Buffalo Sabres | NHL | 5 | 0 | 0 | 0 | 5 | — | — | — | — | — |
| 1985–86 | Rochester Americans | AHL | 40 | 2 | 7 | 9 | 148 | — | — | — | — | — |
| 1986–87 | Buffalo Sabres | NHL | 12 | 0 | 0 | 0 | 40 | — | — | — | — | — |
| 1986–87 | Rochester Americans | AHL | 54 | 1 | 8 | 9 | 204 | 13 | 1 | 0 | 1 | 57 |
| 1987–88 | Rochester Americans | AHL | 69 | 3 | 15 | 18 | 322 | 7 | 0 | 0 | 0 | 28 |
| 1988–89 | Los Angeles Kings | NHL | 1 | 0 | 0 | 0 | 2 | — | — | — | — | — |
| 1988–89 | Rochester Americans | AHL | 34 | 1 | 9 | 10 | 139 | — | — | — | — | — |
| 1989–90 | Rochester Americans | AHL | 52 | 1 | 9 | 10 | 233 | 17 | 1 | 1 | 2 | 56 |
| NHL totals | | | 18 | 0 | 0 | 0 | 47 | — | — | — | — | — |
| AHL totals | | | 319 | 10 | 61 | 71 | 1,212 | 42 | 2 | 1 | 3 | 157 |
