= Tom Martin (ice hockey, born 1964) =

Canadian former ice hockey player (born 1964)

- Born: May 11, 1964 (age 62) Victoria, British Columbia, Canada
- Height: 6 ft 2 in (188 cm)
- Weight: 193 lb (88 kg; 13 st 11 lb)
- Position: Left wing
- Shot: Left
- Played for: Winnipeg Jets; Hartford Whalers; Minnesota North Stars
- NHL draft: 74th overall, 1982; Winnipeg Jets
- Playing career: 1984–1991

Tom Martin (born May 11, 1964) is a Canadian former ice hockey player. He was a fourth round draft pick of the Winnipeg Jets, 74th overall, at the 1982 NHL entry draft. He played 92 National Hockey League (NHL) games for the Jets, Hartford Whalers and Minnesota North Stars in a career predominantly spent in the American Hockey League (AHL). He won the Calder Cup in 1985 and was a First Team AHL All-Star in 1988.

Martin is most famous for having his junior playing rights traded in 1983 by the Seattle Breakers to the Victoria Cougars in exchange for the Cougars' team bus.

== Playing career ==
Following two seasons of junior A hockey in Kelowna, Martin was added to the Seattle Breakers' reserve list. He chose instead to gain an education while playing at the University of Denver in 1982–83. Martin did make it known that he would play junior for his hometown team, the Victoria Cougars, however. The Breakers wished to trade Martin, and were in need of a new team bus. Coincidentally, the Cougars had an extra bus that they purchased from the defunct Spokane Flyers franchise, but as they were unwilling to pay the taxes and fees required to bring the bus into Canada, it was sitting in storage in the United States. As a result, on January 19, 1983, the Cougars traded the bus to the Breakers for Martin and $35,000. Martin earned the nickname "Bussey" for the remainder of his career.

"I know it had bunks on it and it was definitely a team oriented bus. In the Western Hockey League they travel a lot and they need a good bus. Maybe it had better wheels than I did."

— Martin jokingly describes the bus he was traded for in 1983.

He played one season with the Cougars in 1983–84, scoring 75 points in 60 games before turning professional. The draft pick of the Winnipeg Jets finished the 1983–84 season in the American Hockey League with the Sherbrooke Jets where he played five games. Martin remained in the AHL for much of the following three seasons, appearing in a total of 27 regular season and playoff games in the NHL over that time. He won the Calder Cup championship in 1984–85 while a member of the Sherbrooke Canadiens.

He signed as a free agent with the Hartford Whalers in 1987, but spent the majority of the season in the AHL with the Binghamton Whalers where he scored 28 goals and 89 points in 71 games. He was named a First Team AHL All-Star that season. He was acquired in the waiver draft by the Minnesota North Stars at the start of the 1988–89 NHL season, but was sent back to Hartford, also on waivers, after four games. He played 50 more NHL games for Hartford over the next two seasons. He signed as a free agent with the Los Angeles Kings in 1990. Martin played 22 games with their AHL affiliate, the New Haven Nighthawks in 1990–91, after which he retired from professional hockey.

== Career statistics ==
			Regular season					Playoffs
Season	Team	League	GP	G	A	Pts	PIM	GP	G	A	Pts	PIM
1980–81	Kelowna Buckaroos	BCJHL	43	17	34	51	143	—	—	—	—	—
1981–82	Kelowna Buckaroos	BCJHL	43	32	34	66	194	—	—	—	—	—
1982–83	University of Denver	WCHA	37	8	18	26	128	—	—	—	—	—
1983–84	Victoria Cougars	WHL	60	30	45	75	261	—	—	—	—	—
1983–84	Sherbrooke Jets	AHL	5	0	0	0	16	—	—	—	—	—
1984–85	Winnipeg Jets	NHL	8	1	0	1	42	3	0	0	0	2
1984–85	Sherbrooke Canadiens	AHL	58	4	15	19	212	12	1	1	2	72
1985–86	Winnipeg Jets	NHL	5	0	0	0	0	—	—	—	—	—
1985–86	Sherbrooke Canadiens	AHL	69	11	18	29	227	—	—	—	—	—
1986–87	Winnipeg Jets	NHL	11	1	0	1	49	—	—	—	—	—
1986–87	Adirondack Red Wings	AHL	18	5	6	11	57	—	—	—	—	—
1987–88	Hartford Whalers	NHL	5	1	2	3	14	—	—	—	—	—
1987–88	Binghamton Whalers	AHL	71	28	61	89	344	3	0	0	0	18
1988–89	Minnesota North Stars	NHL	4	1	1	2	4	—	—	—	—	—
1988–89	Hartford Whalers	NHL	38	7	6	13	113	1	0	0	0	4
1989–90	Hartford Whalers	NHL	21	1	2	3	27	—	—	—	—	—
1989–90	Binghamton Whalers	AHL	24	4	10	14	113	—	—	—	—	—
1990–91	New Haven Nighthawks	AHL	22	11	7	18	88	—	—	—	—	—
NHL totals			92	12	11	23	249	4	0	0	0	6
