= Bob Bodak =

Canadian ice hockey player

- Born: May 28, 1961 (age 63); Thunder Bay, Ontario, Canada
- Height: 6 ft 2 in (188 cm)
- Weight: 200 lb (91 kg; 14 st 4 lb)
- Position: Left wing
- Shot: Left
- Played for: Calgary Flames; Hartford Whalers
- NHL draft: Undrafted
- Playing career: 1983–1992

Robert Peter Bodak (born May 28, 1961, in Thunder Bay, Ontario) is a retired professional ice hockey player who played in the National Hockey League for the Calgary Flames and Hartford Whalers. A career minor-leaguer, Bodak played only three games with the Flames in 1987–88 and one more with the Whalers in 1989–90. He did not record a point, but had 29 penalty minutes in his four games.

== Career statistics ==
=== Regular season and playoffs ===
			Regular season					Playoffs
Season	Team	League	GP	G	A	Pts	PIM	GP	G	A	Pts	PIM
1979–80	Thunder Bay North Stars	TBJHL	34	20	19	39	25	—	—	—	—	—
1980–81	Belleville Bobcats	MJBHL	2	1	0	1	4	—	—	—	—	—
1981–82	Lakehead University	CIAU	—	—	—	—	—	—	—	—	—	—
1982–83	Lakehead University	CIAU	—	—	—	—	—	—	—	—	—	—
1983–84	Lakehead University	CIAU	22	23	24	47	18	—	—	—	—	—
1984–85	Springfield Indians	AHL	79	20	25	45	52	4	1	0	1	2
1985–86	Springfield Indians	AHL	4	0	0	0	4	—	—	—	—	—
1985–86	Moncton Golden Flames	AHL	58	27	15	42	114	10	3	3	6	0
1986–87	Moncton Golden Flames	AHL	48	11	20	31	75	6	1	1	2	18
1987–88	Calgary Flames	NHL	3	0	0	0	22	—	—	—	—	—
1987–88	Salt Lake Golden Eagles	IHL	43	12	11	23	117	18	1	3	4	74
1988–89	Salt Lake Golden Eagles	IHL	4	0	0	0	2	—	—	—	—	—
1988–89	Binghamton Whalers	AHL	44	15	25	40	135	—	—	—	—	—
1989–90	Hartford Whalers	NHL	1	0	0	0	7	—	—	—	—	—
1989–90	Binghamton Whalers	AHL	79	32	25	57	59	—	—	—	—	—
1990–91	Binghamton Rangers	AHL	27	2	11	13	36	—	—	—	—	—
1990–91	San Diego Gulls	IHL	17	1	5	6	18	—	—	—	—	—
1990–91	Albany Choppers	IHL	5	1	1	2	13	—	—	—	—	—
1991–92	Erie Panthers	ECHL	28	9	11	20	48	—	—	—	—	—
AHL totals			339	107	121	228	475	20	5	4	9	20
NHL totals			4	0	0	0	29	—	—	—	—	—
