= 1988–89 Edmonton Oilers season =

NHL team season

1988–89 Edmonton Oilers
- Division: 3rd Smythe
- Conference: 3rd Campbell
- 1988–89 record: 38–34–8
- Home record: 21–16–3
- Road record: 17–18–5
- Goals for: 325
- Goals against: 306

Team information
- General manager: Glen Sather
- Coach: Glen Sather
- Captain: Mark Messier
- Alternate captains: Glenn Anderson; Kevin Lowe
- Arena: Northlands Coliseum
- Average attendance: 17,503 (100%)
- Minor league affiliates: Cape Breton Oilers (AHL); Denver Rangers (IHL)

Team leaders
- Goals: Jimmy Carson (49)
- Assists: Mark Messier (61)
- Points: Jari Kurri (102)
- Penalty minutes: Kelly Buchberger (234)
- Plus/minus: Craig Muni (+43)
- Wins: Grant Fuhr (23)
- Goals against average: Bill Ranford (3.50)

The 1988–89 Edmonton Oilers season was the Oilers' tenth season in the NHL, and they were coming off a Stanley Cup championship after defeating the Boston Bruins the previous season, which was their fourth Stanley Cup in the past 5 seasons. The Oilers finished third in the Smythe Division with 84 points, their lowest point total since the 1980–81 season. For the eighth consecutive season, the Oilers had five 30-goal scorers.

Prior to the season, the Oilers were involved in one of the biggest trades in NHL history, dealing Wayne Gretzky, Marty McSorley and Mike Krushelnyski to the Los Angeles Kings in exchange for Jimmy Carson, Martin Gelinas, the Kings' first round draft picks in 1989, 1991 and 1993, and $15 million.

Jari Kurri led the club with 102 points, while Jimmy Carson scored a team high 49 goals, and Mark Messier had a team best 61 assists. Charlie Huddy led the defense with 44 points, while Kelly Buchberger provided the team toughness, leading the Oilers with 234 penalty minutes.

In goal, Grant Fuhr got the majority of the starts, leading the team with 23 wins, while Bill Ranford had a team best 3.50 GAA.

The Oilers finished the regular season first in short-handed goals scored, with 27.

In the playoffs, the Oilers faced Wayne Gretzky and the Los Angeles Kings in the opening round of the playoffs. The heavily favored Oilers took a 3–1 series lead, however, the Kings responded by winning 3 games in a row by a combined score of 16–6 to win the series, ending the Oilers bid at winning a third straight Stanley Cup. It marked the first time since 1982 that Edmonton had lost in the first round of the playoffs, coincidentally it was also the Kings who eliminated them in the opening round that year.

== Season standings ==
Smythe Division
	GP	W	L	T	GF	GA	Pts
**Calgary Flames**	80	54	17	9	354	226	117
**Los Angeles Kings**	80	42	31	7	376	335	91
**Edmonton Oilers**	80	38	34	8	325	306	84
**Vancouver Canucks**	80	33	39	8	251	253	74
Winnipeg Jets	80	26	42	12	300	355	64

Note: GP = Games played, W = Wins, L = Losses, T = Ties, Pts = Points, GF = Goals for, GA = Goals against
Note: Teams that qualified for the playoffs are highlighted in bold.

=== Record vs. opponents ===
==== Vs. Campbell Conference ====
**Vs. Smythe Division**

1988–89 NHL records
Team	**CGY**	**EDM**	**LAK**	**VAN**	**WIN**	**Total**
Calgary	—	5–2–1	6–2	5–1–2	5–2–1	**21–8–4**
Edmonton	2–5–1	—	4–4	3–5	4–3–1	**13–17–2**
Los Angeles	2–6	4–4	—	4–4	2–2–4	**12–16–4**
Vancouver	1–5–2	5–3	4–4	—	3–4–1	**13–16–3**
Winnipeg	2–5–1	3–4–1	2–2–4	4–3–1	—	**11–14–7**

**Vs. Norris Division**

1988–89 NHL records
Team	**CHI**	**DET**	**MIN**	**STL**	**TOR**	**Total**
Calgary	3–0	3–0	2–0–1	3–0	0–1–2	**11–1–3**
Edmonton	0–2–1	1–2	1–0–2	3–0	3–0	**8–4–3**
Los Angeles	3–0	3–0	2–1	1–2	3–0	**12–3–0**
Vancouver	2–1	0–0–3	1–2	3–0	1–2	**7–5–3**
Winnipeg	0–3	0–2–1	1–2	1–1–1	3–0	**5–8–2**

Vs. Wales Conference

**Vs. Adams Division**

1988–89 NHL records
Team	**BOS**	**BUF**	**HFD**	**MTL**	**QUE**	**Total**
Calgary	2–1	1–2	2–1	1–2	2–1	**8–7–0**
Edmonton	0–3	2–0–1	2–1	1–2	3–0	**8–6–1**
Los Angeles	1–2	3–0	2–1	0–3	3–0	**9–6–0**
Vancouver	1–2	2–1	1–1–1	0–3	2–1	**6–8–1**
Winnipeg	1–2	1–2	1–2	1–2	1–2	**5–10–0**

**Vs. Patrick Division**

1988–89 NHL records
Team	**NJD**	**NYI**	**NYR**	**PHI**	**PIT**	**WSH**	**Total**
Calgary	3–0	2–0–1	2–1	3–0	2–1	2–0–1	**14–2–2**
Edmonton	1–2	2–1	2–1	1–0–2	2–1	1–2	**9–7–2**
Los Angeles	1–0–2	2–1	1–2	2–1	2–1	1–1–1	**9–6–3**
Vancouver	1–1–1	1–2	0–3	3–0	1–2	1–2	**7–10–1**
Winnipeg	1–0–2	1–2	1–2	0–2–1	1–2	1–2	**5–10–3**

== Schedule and results ==
1988–89 regular season
October

Game	Date	Visitor	Score	Home	Record	Pts
1	October 7	New York Islanders	1–5	Edmonton Oilers	1–0–0	2
2	October 9	Winnipeg Jets	4–5	Edmonton Oilers	2–0–0	4
3	October 12	Vancouver Canucks	6–2	Edmonton Oilers	2–1–0	4
4	October 14	Edmonton Oilers	1–6	Calgary Flames	2–2–0	4
5	October 16	Edmonton Oilers	3–3	Winnipeg Jets	2–2–1	5
6	October 17	Minnesota North Stars	3–3	Edmonton Oilers	2–2–2	6
7	October 19	Los Angeles Kings	6–8	Edmonton Oilers	3–2–2	8
8	October 23	Edmonton Oilers	5–6	Vancouver Canucks	3–3–2	8
9	October 25	Edmonton Oilers	5–4	Los Angeles Kings	4–3–2	10
10	October 29	Washington Capitals	3–4	Edmonton Oilers	5–3–2	12
11	October 30	Chicago Blackhawks	5–2	Edmonton Oilers	5–4–2	12

November

Game	Date	Visitor	Score	Home	Record	Pts
12	November 2	St. Louis Blues	4–5	Edmonton Oilers	6–4–2	14
13	November 4	Buffalo Sabres	3–7	Edmonton Oilers	7–4–2	16
14	November 6	Edmonton Oilers	2–5	Detroit Red Wings	7–5–2	16
15	November 8	Edmonton Oilers	7–3	Pittsburgh Penguins	8–5–2	18
16	November 9	Edmonton Oilers	3–2	New Jersey Devils	9–5–2	20
17	November 12	Edmonton Oilers	6–2	Toronto Maple Leafs	10–5–2	22
18	November 13	Edmonton Oilers	5–4	Buffalo Sabres	11–5–2	24
19	November 16	Winnipeg Jets	2–1	Edmonton Oilers	11–6–2	24
20	November 19	Toronto Maple Leafs	1–9	Edmonton Oilers	12–6–2	26
21	November 20	Edmonton Oilers	4–7	Winnipeg Jets	12–7–2	26
22	November 23	Edmonton Oilers	3–3	Minnesota North Stars	12–7–3	27
23	November 24	Edmonton Oilers	4–2	St. Louis Blues	13–7–3	29
24	November 26	Edmonton Oilers	5–7	Montreal Canadiens	13–8–3	29
25	November 28	Edmonton Oilers	7–4	Quebec Nordiques	14–8–3	31
26	November 30	Vancouver Canucks	2–4	Edmonton Oilers	15–8–3	33

December

Game	Date	Visitor	Score	Home	Record	Pts
27	December 2	Calgary Flames	7–4	Edmonton Oilers	15–9–3	33
28	December 4	New York Rangers	6–10	Edmonton Oilers	16–9–3	35
29	December 7	Quebec Nordiques	3–8	Edmonton Oilers	17–9–3	37
30	December 8	Edmonton Oilers	3–5	Calgary Flames	17–10–3	37
31	December 10	Winnipeg Jets	7–6	Edmonton Oilers	17–11–3	37
32	December 14	Edmonton Oilers	8–2	Toronto Maple Leafs	18–11–3	39
33	December 15	Edmonton Oilers	3–4	Boston Bruins	18–12–3	39
34	December 17	Edmonton Oilers	4–2	Hartford Whalers	19–12–3	41
35	December 19	Edmonton Oilers	5–5	Buffalo Sabres	19–12–4	42
36	December 21	Vancouver Canucks	2–1	Edmonton Oilers	19–13–4	42
37	December 23	Calgary Flames	1–4	Edmonton Oilers	20–13–4	44
38	December 31	Montreal Canadiens	4–2	Edmonton Oilers	20–14–4	44

January

Game	Date	Visitor	Score	Home	Record	Pts
39	January 2	Edmonton Oilers	3–2	Minnesota North Stars	21–14–4	46
40	January 4	Quebec Nordiques	2–4	Edmonton Oilers	22–14–4	48
41	January 7	Edmonton Oilers	2–7	Calgary Flames	22–15–4	48
42	January 8	Calgary Flames	0–6	Edmonton Oilers	23–15–4	50
43	January 10	Edmonton Oilers	4–5	Los Angeles Kings	23–16–4	50
44	January 13	Edmonton Oilers	3–5	Washington Capitals	23–17–4	50
45	January 15	Edmonton Oilers	0–1	New Jersey Devils	23–18–4	50
46	January 16	Edmonton Oilers	2–2	Chicago Blackhawks	23–18–5	51
47	January 18	Edmonton Oilers	9–4	Winnipeg Jets	24–18–5	53
48	January 20	Philadelphia Flyers	1–1	Edmonton Oilers	24–18–6	54
49	January 21	Pittsburgh Penguins	7–4	Edmonton Oilers	24–19–6	54
50	January 23	New York Rangers	3–2	Edmonton Oilers	24–20–6	54
51	January 25	Chicago Blackhawks	6–3	Edmonton Oilers	24–21–6	54
52	January 28	Edmonton Oilers	7–6	Los Angeles Kings	25–21–6	56
53	January 31	Edmonton Oilers	2–6	Vancouver Canucks	25–22–6	56

February

Game	Date	Visitor	Score	Home	Record	Pts
54	February 1	Vancouver Canucks	3–4	Edmonton Oilers	26–22–6	58
55	February 3	Detroit Red Wings	5–8	Edmonton Oilers	27–22–6	60
56	February 5	New Jersey Devils	4–2	Edmonton Oilers	27–23–6	60
57	February 9	Edmonton Oilers	3–1	Philadelphia Flyers	28–23–6	62
58	February 11	Edmonton Oilers	2–5	Boston Bruins	28–24–6	62
59	February 12	Edmonton Oilers	3–1	New York Rangers	29–24–6	64
60	February 14	Edmonton Oilers	3–5	New York Islanders	29–25–6	64
61	February 17	Washington Capitals	8–2	Edmonton Oilers	29–26–6	64
62	February 19	Boston Bruins	4–2	Edmonton Oilers	29–27–6	64
63	February 21	Hartford Whalers	4–7	Edmonton Oilers	30–27–6	66
64	February 24	Los Angeles Kings	1–4	Edmonton Oilers	31–27–6	68
65	February 25	St. Louis Blues	3–5	Edmonton Oilers	32–27–6	70

March

Game	Date	Visitor	Score	Home	Record	Pts
66	March 1	Montreal Canadiens	0–3	Edmonton Oilers	33–27–6	72
67	March 3	Edmonton Oilers	7–4	Winnipeg Jets	34–27–6	74
68	March 5	Edmonton Oilers	4–2	Pittsburgh Penguins	35–27–6	76
69	March 7	Edmonton Oilers	4–4	Philadelphia Flyers	35–27–7	77
70	March 8	Edmonton Oilers	3–7	Hartford Whalers	35–28–7	77
71	March 11	Calgary Flames	5–5	Edmonton Oilers	35–28–8	78
72	March 12	Los Angeles Kings	6–3	Edmonton Oilers	35–29–8	78
73	March 15	Detroit Red Wings	8–6	Edmonton Oilers	35–30–8	78
74	March 16	Edmonton Oilers	0–3	Vancouver Canucks	35–31–8	78
75	March 19	New York Islanders	2–3	Edmonton Oilers	36–31–8	80
76	March 21	Los Angeles Kings	4–3	Edmonton Oilers	36–32–8	80
77	March 23	Winnipeg Jets	4–5	Edmonton Oilers	37–32–8	82
78	March 25	Edmonton Oilers	2–4	Los Angeles Kings	37–33–8	82
79	March 29	Edmonton Oilers	5–2	Vancouver Canucks	38–33–8	84

April

Game	Date	Visitor	Score	Home	Record	Pts
80	April 2	Edmonton Oilers	2–4	Calgary Flames	38–34–8	84

Legend: Win (2 points) Loss (0 points) Tie (1 point)

== Playoffs ==
1989 Stanley Cup playoffs
Smythe Division Semifinals vs. (S2) Los Angeles Kings – Kings win 4–3

Game	Date	Visitor	Score	Home	Serie
1	April 5	Edmonton Oilers	4–3	Los Angeles Kings	1–0
2	April 6	Edmonton Oilers	2–5	Los Angeles Kings	1–1
3	April 8	Los Angeles Kings	0–4	Edmonton Oilers	2–1
4	April 9	Los Angeles Kings	3–4	Edmonton Oilers	3–1
5	April 11	Edmonton Oilers	2–4	Los Angeles Kings	3–2
6	April 13	Los Angeles Kings	4–1	Edmonton Oilers	3–3
7	April 15	Edmonton Oilers	3–6	Los Angeles Kings	3–4

Legend: Win Loss

== Season stats ==
=== Scoring leaders ===
Player	GP	G	A	Pts	PIM
Jari Kurri	76	44	58	102	69
Jimmy Carson	80	49	51	100	36
Mark Messier	72	33	61	94	130
Esa Tikkanen	67	31	47	78	92
Craig Simpson	66	35	41	76	80

=== Goaltending ===
Player	GP	TOI	W	L	T	GA	SO	Save %	GAA
Bill Ranford	29	1509	15	8	2	88	1	.877	3.50
Grant Fuhr	59	3341	23	26	6	213	1	.875	3.83

== Playoff stats ==
=== Scoring leaders ===
Player	GP	G	A	Pts	PIM
Mark Messier	7	1	11	12	8
Jari Kurri	7	3	5	8	6
Steve Smith	7	2	2	4	20
Esa Tikkanen	7	1	3	4	12
Jimmy Carson	7	2	1	3	6
Normand Lacombe	7	2	1	3	21

=== Goaltending ===
Player	GP	TOI	W	L	GA	SO	Save %	GAA
Grant Fuhr	7	417	3	4	24	1	.894	3.45

== Awards and records ==
40th National Hockey League All-Star Game

- Glen Sather, Head Coach, Campbell Conference
- Kevin Lowe, Defense, Starter
- Jari Kurri, Right Wing, Starter
- Grant Fuhr, Goaltender, Starter
- Mark Messier, Centre, Reserve
- Jimmy Carson, Centre, Reserve

=== Milestones ===
Regular Season
Player	Milestone	Reached
Martin Gelinas	1st NHL Game; 1st NHL Assist; 1st NHL Point	October 7, 1988
Steve Smith	200th NHL Game	October 9, 1988
Charlie Huddy	500th NHL Game	October 16, 1988
Kelly Buchberger	100th NHL PIM	October 17, 1988
Martin Gelinas	1st NHL Goal	October 17, 1988
Greg Adams	200th NHL Point	October 19, 1988
Chris Joseph	1st NHL Goal	October 19, 1988
Mark Messier	900th NHL PIM	October 19, 1988
Jari Kurri	400th NHL Goal	October 23, 1988
Esa Tikkanen	200th NHL Game	October 25, 1988
Keith Acton	600th NHL Game	October 29, 1988
Jimmy Carson	100th NHL Assist	October 29, 1988
Craig Simpson	100th NHL Goal	October 30, 1988
Jimmy Carson	200th NHL Point	November 4, 1988
Mark Messier	3rd NHL Gordie Howe hat trick	November 4, 1988
Glen Cochrane	400th NHL Game	November 8, 1988
Jari Kurri	18th NHL Hat-trick	November 8, 1988
Esa Tikkanen	4th NHL Hat-trick	November 12, 1988
Jimmy Carson	100th NHL Goal	November 13, 1988
Kevin Lowe	700th NHL Game	November 16, 1988
Glenn Anderson	19th NHL Hat-trick; 3rd Four-Goal NHL Game	November 19, 1988
Kevin McClelland	1,300th NHL PIM	November 19, 1988
Normand Lacombe	100th NHL PIM	November 26, 1988
Craig Simpson	200th NHL Point	December 2, 1988
Steve Smith	700th NHL PIM	December 4, 1988
Jimmy Carson	6th NHL Hat-trick	December 6, 1988
Kelly Buchberger	1st NHL Assist	December 7, 1988
Jari Kurri	19th NHL Hat-trick	December 7, 1988
Esa Tikkanen	200th NHL Point	December 7, 1988
Craig Muni	200th NHL PIM	December 8, 1988
Craig Muni	200th NHL Game	December 10, 1988
Jari Kurri	900th NHL Point	December 14, 1988
Kim Issel	1st NHL Game	December 23, 1988
Kevin Lowe	300th NHL Point	December 23, 1988
Alan May	1st NHL Goal; 1st NHL Point	December 23, 1988
Jimmy Carson	200th NHL Game	January 4, 1989
Kelly Buchberger	200th NHL PIM	January 8, 1989
Kevin McClelland	100th NHL Assist	January 8, 1989
Jeff Beukeboom	400th NHL PIM	January 10, 1989
Craig Simpson	100th NHL Assist	January 10, 1989
Dave Hunter	900th NHL PIM	January 16, 1989
Charlie Huddy	300th NHL Point	January 20, 1989
Francois Leroux	1st NHL Game	January 21, 1989
Mark Messier	800th NHL Point	January 21, 1989
Craig MacTavish	500th NHL Game	January 23, 1989
Glenn Anderson	400th NHL Assist	January 25, 1989
Grant Fuhr	200th NHL Win	January 28, 1989
Mike Ware	1st NHL Game	January 28, 1989
Mike Ware	1st NHL Assist; 1st NHL Point	January 31, 1989
Jari Kurri	500th NHL Assist	February 3, 1989
Craig Simpson	300th NHL PIM	February 3, 1989
Greg Adams	1,100th NHL PIM	February 12, 1989
Mark Messier	700th NHL Game	February 12, 1989
Mark Messier	10th NHL Hat-trick; 2nd Four-Goal NHL Game	February 21, 1989
Craig Simpson	2nd NHL Hat-trick	February 25, 1989
Normand Lacombe	200th NHL Game	March 1, 1989
Mark Messier	1,000th NHL PIM	March 3, 1989
Keith Acton	700th NHL PIM	March 4, 1989
Randy Gregg	400th NHL Game	March 11, 1989
Kelly Buchberger	300th NHL PIM	March 15, 1989
Charlie Huddy	400th NHL PIM	March 19, 1989
Mark Messier	500th NHL Assist	March 21, 1989
Kevin Lowe	800th NHL PIM	March 23, 1989
Kevin McClelland	1,400th NHL PIM	March 25, 1989
Jimmy Carson	100th NHL PIM	March 29, 1989
Craig MacTavish	300th NHL PIM	March 29, 1989
Jari Kurri	300th NHL PIM	April 2, 1989

Playoffs
Player	Milestone	Reached
Dave Hunter	100th NHL Game	April 5, 1989
Craig Muni	50th NHL PIM	April 5, 1989
Randy Gregg	100th NHL PIM	April 6, 1989
Mark Lamb	1st NHL Assist; 1st NHL Point	April 8, 1989
Normand Lacombe	1st NHL Assist	April 9, 1989
Glenn Anderson	250th NHL PIM	April 11, 1989
John LeBlanc	1st NHL Game	April 15, 1989
Mark Messier	100th NHL Assist	April 15, 1989

== Transactions ==
=== Trades ===
July 22, 1988	To Washington Capitals Geoff Courtnall	To Edmonton Oilers Greg Adams
August 9, 1988	To Los Angeles Kings Wayne Gretzky; Mike Krushelnyski; Marty McSorley	To Edmonton Oilers Jimmy Carson; Martin Gelinas; 1st-round pick in 1989; 1st-round pick in 1991; 1st-round pick in 1993 ($15 million) cash
August 10, 1988	To Los Angeles Kings John Miner	To Edmonton Oilers Craig Redmond
October 27, 1988	To New York Rangers Ron Shudra	To Edmonton Oilers Jeff Crossman
January 3, 1989	To Detroit Red Wings 10th-round pick in 1989	To Edmonton Oilers Miroslav Frycer
January 23, 1989	To Detroit Red Wings 12th-round pick in 1989	To Edmonton Oilers Doug Halward
February 7, 1989	To Philadelphia Flyers Keith Acton; 6th-round pick in 1991	To Edmonton Oilers Dave Brown
February 15, 1989	To New York Islanders 5th round pick in 1989	To Edmonton Oilers Tomas Jonsson
March 7, 1989	To Los Angeles Kings Jim Wiemer; Alan May	To Edmonton Oilers Brian Wilks; John English
March 7, 1989	To Vancouver Canucks Greg Adams; Doug Smith	To Edmonton Oilers John LeBlanc; 5th-round pick in 1989

=== Free agents ===
Player	Former team
D Reed Larson	Boston Bruins
F Stan Drulia	Pittsburgh Penguins
F Nick Fotiu	Philadelphia Flyers

Player	New team
F Shawn Evans	New York Islanders
F Dean Hopkins	Quebec Nordiques
D Reed Larson	New York Islanders

=== Waivers ===
Date	Player	Team
October 3, 1988	Steve Dykstra	to Pittsburgh Penguins
October 3, 1988	Dave Hannan	to Pittsburgh Penguins
October 3, 1988	Ken Hammond	from Los Angeles Kings
October 3, 1988	Dave Hunter	to Winnipeg Jets
October 3, 1988	Craig Redmond	to New York Rangers
October 3, 1988	Doug Smith	Buffalo Sabres
November 1, 1988	Ken Hammond	to New York Rangers
November 1, 1988	Craig Redmond	from New York Rangers
November 7, 1988	Glen Cochrane	from Chicago Blackhawks
January 14, 1989	Dave Hunter	from Winnipeg Jets

== Draft picks ==
Edmonton's draft picks at the 1988 NHL entry draft

Round	#	Player	Nationality	College/junior/club team (league)
1	19	Francois Leroux	Canada	Saint-Jean Castors (QMJHL)
2	39	Petro Koivunen	Finland	Kiekko-Espoo (Finland)
3	53	Trevor Sim	Canada	Seattle Thunderbirds (WHL)
3	61	Collin Bauer	Canada	Saskatoon Blades (WHL)
4	82	Cam Brauer	Canada	Rensselaer Polytechnic Institute (ECAC)
5	103	Don Martin	Canada	London Knights (OHL)
6	124	Len Barrie	Canada	Victoria Cougars (WHL)
7	145	Mike Glover	Canada	Sault Ste. Marie Greyhounds (OHL)
8	166	Shjon Podein	United States	University of Minnesota Duluth (WCHA)
9	187	Tom Cole	United States	Woburn Memorial High School (USHS-MA)
10	208	Vladimir Zubkov	Soviet Union	CSKA Moscow (Soviet Union)
11	229	Darin MacDonald	United States	Boston University (ECAC)
12	250	Tim Tisdale	Canada	Swift Current Broncos (WHL)
S	24	Brian Dowd	Canada	Northeastern University (Hockey East)
