= Steve Dykstra =

Canadian ice hockey player (born 1962)

- Born: December 1, 1962 (age 62); Edmonton Alberta, Canada
- Height: 6 ft 3 in (191 cm)
- Weight: 220 lb (100 kg; 15 st 10 lb)
- Position: Defence
- Shot: Left
- Played for: Buffalo Sabres; Edmonton Oilers; Pittsburgh Penguins; Hartford Whalers
- NHL draft: Undrafted
- Playing career: 1981–1998

Steven Dykstra (born December 1, 1962) is a Canadian former professional ice hockey defenceman. He played in the National Hockey League with the Buffalo Sabres, Edmonton Oilers, Pittsburgh Penguins, and Hartford Whalers.

In his NHL career, Dykstra appeared in 217 games. He scored 8 goals and added 32 assists.

In 1988, he played 27 games for Buffalo Sabres before being traded to Edmonton for Scott Metcalfe. He played 15 of the season's last 21 games for Edmonton. Dykstra did receive a 1988 Stanley Cup ring, as he played the required 42 regular-season games, but his name was left off the Cup, because not all 42 games were played with Edmonton.

== Career statistics ==
=== Regular season and playoffs ===
			Regular season					Playoffs
Season	Team	League	GP	G	A	Pts	PIM	GP	G	A	Pts	PIM
1981–82	Seattle Breakers	WHL	57	8	26	34	139	10	3	1	4	42
1982–83	Rochester Americans	AHL	70	2	16	18	100	15	0	5	5	27
1983–84	Rochester Americans	AHL	64	3	19	22	141	6	0	0	0	46
1984–85	Rochester Americans	AHL	51	9	23	32	113	2	0	1	1	10
1984–85	Flint Generals	IHL	15	1	7	8	36	—	—	—	—	—
1985–86	Buffalo Sabres	NHL	64	4	21	25	108	—	—	—	—	—
1986–87	Rochester Americans	AHL	18	0	0	0	77	—	—	—	—	—
1986–87	Buffalo Sabres	NHL	37	0	1	1	179	—	—	—	—	—
1987–88	Rochester Americans	AHL	7	0	1	1	33	—	—	—	—	—
1987–88	Buffalo Sabres	NHL	27	1	1	2	91	—	—	—	—	—
1987–88	Edmonton Oilers	NHL	15	2	3	5	39	—	—	—	—	—
1988–89	Pittsburgh Penguins	NHL	65	1	6	7	126	1	0	0	0	2
1989–90	Binghamton Whalers	AHL	53	5	17	22	55	—	—	—	—	—
1989–90	Hartford Whalers	NHL	9	0	0	0	2	—	—	—	—	—
1989–90	Maine Mariners	AHL	16	0	4	4	20	—	—	—	—	—
1990–91	San Diego Gulls	IHL	72	6	18	24	141	—	—	—	—	—
1993–94	Toledo Storm	ECHL	11	3	5	8	37	12	0	2	2	23
1994–95	Toledo Storm	ECHL	10	1	5	6	19	—	—	—	—	—
1994–95	Fort Worth Fire	CHL	10	0	2	2	12	—	—	—	—	—
1995–96	Fort Worth Fire	CHL	57	4	12	16	84	—	—	—	—	—
1997–98	Fort Worth Fire	CHL	23	2	12	14	32	—	—	—	—	—
NHL totals			217	8	32	40	545	1	0	0	0	2
