= 1988–89 Los Angeles Kings season =

National Hockey League team season

1988–89 Los Angeles Kings
- Division: 2nd Smythe
- Conference: 2nd Campbell
- 1988–89 record: 42–31–7
- Home record: 25–12–3
- Road record: 17–19–4
- Goals for: 376
- Goals against: 335

Team information
- General manager: Rogatien Vachon
- Coach: Robbie Ftorek
- Captain: Dave Taylor
- Alternate captains: Wayne Gretzky; Tom Laidlaw
- Arena: Great Western Forum

Team leaders
- Goals: Bernie Nicholls (70)
- Assists: Wayne Gretzky (114)
- Points: Wayne Gretzky (168)
- Penalty minutes: Marty McSorley (350)
- Plus/minus: Steve Duchesne (+31)
- Wins: Glenn Healy (25)
- Goals against average: Kelly Hrudey (2.90)

The 1988–89 Los Angeles Kings season, was the Kings' 22nd season in the National Hockey League (NHL). It saw the Kings finish second in the Smythe Division with a record of 42 wins and 31 losses and 7 losses in overtime for 91 points.

The 1988–89 season was the first for the great Wayne Gretzky in a Kings uniform. He had come over in a shocking trade with the Edmonton Oilers in the off-season (see below). Paced by Gretzky, Los Angeles Kings led the league in goal scoring, with a total of 376 goals scored. In the playoffs, the Kings completed the upset by beating the Oilers (defending champions and Gretzky's former team) in seven games in the Smythe Division Semi-finals before being swept in the Smythe Division Finals by the eventual Stanley Cup champion Calgary Flames in four straight games.

This was also the first season that the Kings wore their silver and black uniforms, which they would wear until the 1997–98 season. In the off-season, they had changed their team colours to silver and black from gold and purple, which were more associated with their co-tenants at the Great Western Forum, the National Basketball Association's Los Angeles Lakers. They had also unveiled a new logo that reflected the new team colours.

As of 2025, this remains the most recent season where the Kings eliminated the Oilers in the playoffs as the Kings have lost 7 straight playoff series since, and the Kings are 2–9 all time in series wins against the Oilers.

== Offseason ==
=== NHL draft ===
Round	Pick	Player	Nationality	College/junior/club team
1	7	Martin Gélinas (LW)	Canada	Hull Olympiques (QMJHL)
2	28	Paul Holden (D)	Canada	London Knights (OHL)
3	49	John Van Kessel (RW)	Canada	North Bay Centennials (OHL)
4	70	Rob Blake (D)	Canada	Bowling Green State University (CCHA)
5	91	Jeff Robison (D)	United States	Mount St. Charles Academy (USHS-RI)
6	109	Micah Aivazoff (RW)	Canada	Victoria Cougars (WHL)
6	112	Robert Larsson (D)	Sweden	Skellefteå AIK (Sweden)
7	133	Jeff Kruesel (RW)	United States	John Marshall High School (USHS-MN)
8	154	Timo Peltomaa (RW)	Finland	Ilves (Finland)
9	175	Jim Larkin (LW)	United States	Mount Saint Joseph Academy (USHS-VT)
10	196	Brad Hyatt (D)	Canada	Windsor Spitfires (OHL)
11	217	Doug Laprade (RW)	Canada	Lake Superior State University (NCAA)
12	238	Joe Flanagan (C)	United States	Canterbury School (USHS-CT)
S	12	Sean Fitzgerald (LW)	United States	State University of New York at Oswego (SUNYAC)

=== Wayne Gretzky trade ===
On August 9, 1988, in a move that drastically changed the dynamics of the NHL, the Oilers traded Gretzky (along with Marty McSorley and Mike Krushelnyski) to the Los Angeles Kings in exchange for Jimmy Carson, Martin Gelinas, $15 million in cash and the Kings' first-round draft picks in 1989 (Jason Miller), 1991 (Martin Rucinsky) and 1993 (Nick Stajduhar). "The Trade", as it came to be known, upset Canadians to the extent that New Democratic Party House Leader Nelson Riis demanded that the government block it and Peter Pocklington was burned in effigy. Gretzky himself was considered a "traitor" by some Canadians for turning his back on his adopted hometown, his home province and his home country; his motivation was widely rumoured to be the furtherance of his wife's acting career. Others believe it was Pocklington who instigated the trade, seeking to benefit personally from the transaction.

== Regular season ==
On October 6, 1988, Wayne Gretzky made his debut as a member of the Los Angeles Kings in a game against the Detroit Red Wings. Gretzky scored on his first shot, and contributed 3 assists in an 8–2 victory. In Gretzky's first season with the Kings, he led the team in scoring with 168 points on 54 goals and 114 assists, and won his ninth Hart Memorial Trophy as the league's Most Valuable Player. He led the Kings to a second-place finish in the Smythe Division with a 42–31–7 record (91 points), and they ranked fourth in the NHL overall.

Gretzky recorded at least one point in all forty regular season home games, as well as the Kings' six home playoff games. No other NHL player has ever accomplished such a feat under a schedule of seventy games or more.

Gretzky's first season in Los Angeles saw a marked increase in attendance and fan interest in a city not previously known for following hockey. The Kings, who then played their home games at the Great Western Forum, named Gretzky their captain (a position he held until his trade to St. Louis in 1996) and boasted numerous sellouts on their way to reaching the 1989 playoffs.

- December 1, 1988: Bernie Nicholls had an eight-point game versus the Toronto Maple Leafs.

=== Season standings ===
Smythe Division
	GP	W	L	T	GF	GA	Pts
**Calgary Flames**	80	54	17	9	354	226	117
**Los Angeles Kings**	80	42	31	7	376	335	91
**Edmonton Oilers**	80	38	34	8	325	306	84
**Vancouver Canucks**	80	33	39	8	251	253	74
Winnipeg Jets	80	26	42	12	300	355	64

Note: GP = Games played, W = Wins, L = Losses, T = Ties, Pts = Points, GF = Goals for, GA = Goals against
Note: Teams that qualified for the playoffs are highlighted in bold.

=== Record vs. opponents ===
==== Vs. Campbell Conference ====
**Vs. Smythe Division**

1988–89 NHL records
Team	**CGY**	**EDM**	**LAK**	**VAN**	**WIN**	**Total**
Calgary	—	5–2–1	6–2	5–1–2	5–2–1	**21–8–4**
Edmonton	2–5–1	—	4–4	3–5	4–3–1	**13–17–2**
Los Angeles	2–6	4–4	—	4–4	2–2–4	**12–16–4**
Vancouver	1–5–2	5–3	4–4	—	3–4–1	**13–16–3**
Winnipeg	2–5–1	3–4–1	2–2–4	4–3–1	—	**11–14–7**

**Vs. Norris Division**

1988–89 NHL records
Team	**CHI**	**DET**	**MIN**	**STL**	**TOR**	**Total**
Calgary	3–0	3–0	2–0–1	3–0	0–1–2	**11–1–3**
Edmonton	0–2–1	1–2	1–0–2	3–0	3–0	**8–4–3**
Los Angeles	3–0	3–0	2–1	1–2	3–0	**12–3–0**
Vancouver	2–1	0–0–3	1–2	3–0	1–2	**7–5–3**
Winnipeg	0–3	0–2–1	1–2	1–1–1	3–0	**5–8–2**

Vs. Wales Conference

**Vs. Adams Division**

1988–89 NHL records
Team	**BOS**	**BUF**	**HFD**	**MTL**	**QUE**	**Total**
Calgary	2–1	1–2	2–1	1–2	2–1	**8–7–0**
Edmonton	0–3	2–0–1	2–1	1–2	3–0	**8–6–1**
Los Angeles	1–2	3–0	2–1	0–3	3–0	**9–6–0**
Vancouver	1–2	2–1	1–1–1	0–3	2–1	**6–8–1**
Winnipeg	1–2	1–2	1–2	1–2	1–2	**5–10–0**

**Vs. Patrick Division**

1988–89 NHL records
Team	**NJD**	**NYI**	**NYR**	**PHI**	**PIT**	**WSH**	**Total**
Calgary	3–0	2–0–1	2–1	3–0	2–1	2–0–1	**14–2–2**
Edmonton	1–2	2–1	2–1	1–0–2	2–1	1–2	**9–7–2**
Los Angeles	1–0–2	2–1	1–2	2–1	2–1	1–1–1	**9–6–3**
Vancouver	1–1–1	1–2	0–3	3–0	1–2	1–2	**7–10–1**
Winnipeg	1–0–2	1–2	1–2	0–2–1	1–2	1–2	**5–10–3**

== Schedule and results ==
1988–89 regular season
October

Game	Date	Visitor	Score	Home	OT	Record	Points
1	October 6	Detroit	2 – 8	Los Angeles		1–0–0	2
2	October 8	Calgary	5 – 6	Los Angeles	OT	2–0–0	4
3	October 9	N.Y. Islanders	5 – 6	Los Angeles	OT	3–0–0	6
4	October 12	Boston	2 – 6	Los Angeles		4–0–0	8
5	October 15	Philadelphia	1 – 4	Los Angeles		4–1–0	8
6	October 17	Los Angeles	4 – 11	Calgary		4–2–0	8
7	October 19	Los Angeles	6 – 8	Edmonton		4–3–0	8
8	October 22	Minnesota	8 – 2	Los Angeles		5–3–0	10
9	October 25	Edmonton	4 – 5	Los Angeles		5–4–0	10
10	October 28	Los Angeles	7 – 4	Winnipeg		6–4–0	12
11	October 30	Los Angeles	4 – 8	Winnipeg		6–5–0	12

November

Game	Date	Visitor	Score	Home	OT	Record	Points
12	November 1	Los Angeles	3 – 1	Quebec		7–5–0	14
13	November 2	Los Angeles	3 – 5	Montreal		7–6–0	14
14	November 5	Los Angeles	6 – 4	Toronto		8–6–0	16
15	November 6	Los Angeles	5 – 3	Chicago		9–6–0	18
16	November 10	Hartford	7 – 2	Los Angeles		10–6–0	20
17	November 12	Pittsburgh	7 – 2	Los Angeles		11–6–0	22
18	November 15	Vancouver	6 – 4	Los Angeles		12–6–0	24
19	November 17	N.Y. Rangers	5 – 6	Los Angeles		12–7–0	24
20	November 19	Buffalo	5 – 4	Los Angeles		13–7–0	26
21	November 22	Los Angeles	6 – 1	Philadelphia		14–7–0	28
22	November 23	Los Angeles	8 – 3	Detroit		15–7–0	30
23	November 26	Los Angeles	1 – 4	Calgary		15–8–0	30
24	November 27	Los Angeles	2 – 5	Vancouver		15–9–0	30
25	November 29	New Jersey	9 – 3	Los Angeles		16–9–0	32

December

Game	Date	Visitor	Score	Home	OT	Record	Points
26	December 1	Toronto	9 – 3	Los Angeles		17–9–0	34
27	December 3	Chicago	6 – 4	Los Angeles		18–9–0	36
28	December 6	Winnipeg	4 – 5	Los Angeles	OT	18–10–0	36
29	December 8	Winnipeg	5 – 5	Los Angeles	OT	18–10–1	37
30	December 10	Los Angeles	4 – 3	N.Y. Islanders		19–10–1	39
31	December 12	Los Angeles	5 – 2	N.Y. Rangers		20–10–1	41
32	December 14	Los Angeles	4 – 5	Pittsburgh		20–11–1	41
33	December 16	Los Angeles	6 – 4	Detroit		21–11–1	43
34	December 17	Los Angeles	2 – 3	Minnesota		21–12–1	43
35	December 20	Calgary	7 – 3	Los Angeles		22–12–1	45
36	December 21	Minnesota	8 – 6	Los Angeles		23–12–1	47
37	December 23	Los Angeles	5 – 2	Vancouver		24–12–1	49
38	December 27	Montreal	2 – 3	Los Angeles		24–13–1	49
39	December 29	Vancouver	3 – 6	Los Angeles		24–14–1	49

January

Game	Date	Visitor	Score	Home	OT	Record	Points
40	January 5	Los Angeles	6 – 8	Calgary		24–15–1	49
41	January 6	Los Angeles	4 – 4	Winnipeg	OT	24–15–2	50
42	January 8	Los Angeles	4 – 4	Winnipeg	OT	24–15–3	51
43	January 10	Edmonton	5 – 4	Los Angeles	OT	25–15–3	53
44	January 12	St. Louis	7 – 4	Los Angeles		26–15–3	55
45	January 14	Hartford	9 – 6	Los Angeles		27–15–3	57
46	January 17	Los Angeles	2 – 5	St. Louis		27–16–3	57
47	January 19	Los Angeles	2 – 4	N.Y. Islanders		27–17–3	57
48	January 21	Los Angeles	4 – 5	Hartford		27–18–3	57
49	January 24	Los Angeles	4 – 4	Washington	OT	27–18–4	58
50	January 26	Vancouver	2 – 6	Los Angeles		27–19–4	58
51	January 28	Edmonton	6 – 7	Los Angeles		27–20–4	58
52	January 31	Calgary	5 – 8	Los Angeles		27–21–4	58

February

Game	Date	Visitor	Score	Home	OT	Record	Points
53	February 2	New Jersey	6 – 6	Los Angeles	OT	27–21–5	59
54	February 4	Buffalo	5 – 3	Los Angeles		28–21–5	61
55	February 9	Los Angeles	1 – 4	Boston		28–22–5	61
56	February 10	Los Angeles	7 – 6	Washington	OT	29–22–5	63
57	February 12	Los Angeles	6 – 2	Chicago		30–22–5	65
58	February 15	Boston	3 – 7	Los Angeles		30–23–5	65
59	February 18	Quebec	11 – 3	Los Angeles		31–23–5	67
60	February 20	Toronto	5 – 4	Los Angeles		32–23–5	69
61	February 22	Washington	2 – 7	Los Angeles		32–24–5	69
62	February 24	Los Angeles	1 – 4	Edmonton		32–25–5	69
63	February 26	Los Angeles	1 – 1	New Jersey		32–25–6	70
64	February 27	Los Angeles	4 – 6	N.Y. Rangers		32–26–6	70

March

Game	Date	Visitor	Score	Home	OT	Record	Points
65	March 1	Los Angeles	5 – 4	Buffalo		33–26–6	72
66	March 2	Los Angeles	4 – 6	St. Louis		33–27–6	72
67	March 4	Philadelphia	6 – 2	Los Angeles		34–27–6	74
68	March 7	Pittsburgh	3 – 2	Los Angeles	OT	35–27–6	76
69	March 10	Los Angeles	2 – 4	Vancouver		35–28–6	76
70	March 12	Los Angeles	6 – 3	Edmonton		36–28–6	78
71	March 14	Los Angeles	4 – 0	Quebec		37–28–6	80
72	March 15	Los Angeles	2 – 5	Montreal		37–29–6	80
73	March 18	Calgary	3 – 9	Los Angeles		37–30–6	80
74	March 21	Los Angeles	4 – 3	Edmonton		38–30–6	82
75	March 23	Los Angeles	2 – 4	Calgary		38–31–6	82
76	March 25	Edmonton	4 – 2	Los Angeles		39–31–6	84
77	March 28	Winnipeg	3 – 3	Los Angeles	OT	39–31–7	85
78	March 29	Winnipeg	2 – 1	Los Angeles	OT	40–31–7	87

April

Game	Date	Visitor	Score	Home	OT	Record	Points
79	April 1	Vancouver	6 – 4	Los Angeles		41–31–7	89
80	April 2	Los Angeles	5 – 4	Vancouver		42–31–7	91

Legend: Win (2 points) Loss (0 points) Tie (1 point)

== Playoffs ==
=== Smythe Division Semifinals ===
The Kings faced Gretzky's old team, the Oilers, in the first round of the 1989 playoffs. They fell behind 3 games to 1, but rallied to take the series in seven games, helped in no small part by nine goals from Chris Kontos, a little-known player who had just recently been called up from the minor leagues. However, the Kings were quickly swept out of the playoffs in the second round by the eventual Stanley Cup champion Calgary Flames.

- Edmonton Oilers vs. Los Angeles Kings

Date	Away	Score	Home	Score
April 5	Edmonton Oilers	4	Los Angeles Kings	3
April 6	Edmonton Oilers	2	Los Angeles Kings	5
April 8	Los Angeles Kings	0	Edmonton Oilers	4
April 9	Los Angeles Kings	3	Edmonton Oilers	4
April 11	Edmonton Oilers	2	Los Angeles Kings	4
April 13	Los Angeles Kings	4	Edmonton Oilers	1
April 15	Edmonton Oilers	3	Los Angeles Kings	6

Los Angeles wins best-of-seven series 4 games to 3

=== Smythe Division Finals ===
Los Angeles Kings vs. Calgary Flames

Date	Away	Score	Home	Score	Notes
April 18	Los Angeles Kings	3	Calgary Flames	4	(OT)
April 20	Los Angeles Kings	3	Calgary Flames	8	
April 22	Calgary Flames	5	Los Angeles Kings	2	
April 24	Calgary Flames	5	Los Angeles Kings	3	

Calgary wins best-of-seven series 4 games to 0

== Player statistics ==
=== Forwards ===
Note: GP = Games played; G = Goals; A = Assists; Pts = Points; PIM = Penalty minutes

Player	GP	G	A	Pts	PIM
Wayne Gretzky	78	54	114	168	26
Bernie Nicholls	79	70	80	150	96
Luc Robitaille	78	46	52	98	65
John Tonelli	77	31	33	64	110
Dave Taylor	70	26	37	63	80
Mike Krushelnyski	78	26	36	62	110
Mike Allison	55	14	22	36	122
Bob Carpenter	39	11	15	26	16
Steve Kasper	29	9	15	24	14
Igor Liba	27	5	13	18	21
Jay Miller	29	5	3	8	133
Paul Fenton	21	2	3	5	6
Sylvain Couturier	16	1	3	4	2
Bob Kudelski	14	1	3	4	17
Ken Baumgartner	49	1	3	4	288
Tim Tookey	7	2	1	3	4
Chris Kontos	7	2	1	3	2
Phil Sykes	23	0	1	1	8
Hubie McDonough	4	0	1	1	0
Gilles Hamel	11	0	1	1	2
Brian Wilks	2	0	0	0	2
Paul Guay	2	0	0	0	2
Dave Pasin	5	0	0	0	0
Craig Duncanson	5	0	0	0	0
Robert Logan	4	0	0	0	0

=== Defensemen ===
Note: GP = Games played; G = Goals; A = Assists; Pts = Points; PIM = Penalty minutes

Player	GP	G	A	Pts	PIM
Steve Duchesne	79	25	50	75	92
Dale DeGray	63	6	22	28	97
Marty McSorley	66	10	17	27	350
Doug Crossman	74	10	15	25	53
Tim Watters	76	3	18	21	168
Tom Laidlaw	70	3	17	20	63
Dean Kennedy	51	3	8	11	63
Jim Wiemer	9	2	3	5	20
Wayne McBean	33	0	5	5	23
Larry Playfair	6	0	3	3	16
Petr Prajsler	2	0	3	3	0
Steve Richmond	9	0	2	2	26
Jim Hofford	1	0	0	0	2

=== Goaltending ===
Note: GP = Games played; W = Wins; L = Losses; T = Ties; SO = Shutouts; GAA = Goals against average

Player	GP	W	L	T	SO	GAA
Glenn Healy	48	25	19	2	0	4.27
Kelly Hrudey	16	10	4	2	1	2.90
Roland Melanson	4	1	1	0	0	6.42

== Awards and records ==
- Wayne Gretzky, Hart Memorial Trophy
- Wayne Gretzky, Center, NHL Second All-Star Team
- Wayne Gretzky, All-Star Game MVP
- Luc Robitaille, Left Wing, NHL First All-Star Team
- Wayne Gretzky, Club Record, Most Points in One Season (168)
- Bernie Nicholls, Club Record, Most Goals in One Season (70)

== Transactions ==
The Kings were involved in the following transactions during the 1988–89 season.

=== Trades ===
August 9, 1988	To Los Angeles Kings Wayne Gretzky; Mike Krushelnyski; Marty McSorley	To Edmonton Oilers Jimmy Carson; Martin Gelinas; 1st round pick in 1989 – Jason Miller; 1st round pick in 1991 – Martin Rucinsky; 1st round pick in 1993 – Nick Stajduhar $15 million
August 10, 1988	To Los Angeles Kings John Miner	To Edmonton Oilers Craig Redmond
September 29, 1988	To Los Angeles Kings Doug Crossman	To Philadelphia Flyers Jay Wells
October 21, 1988	To Los Angeles Kings Bob Logan; 9th round pick in 1989 – Jim Giacin	To Buffalo Sabres Larry Playfair
November 3, 1988	To Los Angeles Kings Dave Pasin	To Boston Bruins Paul Guay
November 25, 1988	To Los Angeles Kings Gilles Hamel	To Winnipeg Jets Paul Fenton
December 12, 1988	To Los Angeles Kings Igor Liba; Michael Boyce; Todd Elik; Future considerations	To New York Rangers Dean Kennedy; Denis Larocque
December 13, 1988	To Los Angeles Kings Cash	To New Jersey Devils Lyle Phair
January 22, 1989	To Los Angeles Kings Jay Miller; Steve Kasper	To Boston Bruins Bobby Carpenter
February 3, 1989	To Los Angeles Kings Dean Kennedy	To New York Rangers 4th round pick in 1990 – Cal McGowan
February 22, 1989	To Los Angeles Kings Kelly Hrudey	To New York Islanders Mark Fitzpatrick; Wayne McBean; Future considerations
March 6, 1989	To Los Angeles Kings Pat Mayer	To Pittsburgh Penguins Tim Tookey
March 7, 1989	To Los Angeles Kings Alan May; Jim Wiemer	To Edmonton Oilers Brian Wilks; John English

=== Free agent signings ===
June 27, 1988	From Winnipeg Jets Tim Watters
June 29, 1988	From Calgary Flames John Tonelli
July 1, 1988	From Granby Bisons (QMJHL) Frank Breault
July 1, 1988	From New Jersey Devils Steve Richmond

=== Waivers ===
October 3, 1988	To Edmonton Oilers Ken Hammond
October 3, 1988	From Toronto Maple Leafs Dale DeGray
October 3, 1988	From Buffalo Sabres Jim Hofford
