= 1988–89 Calgary Flames season =

NHL team season

1988–89 Calgary Flames
- Stanley Cup champions
- Presidents' Trophy winners
- Campbell Conference champions
- Smythe Division champions
- Division: 1st Smythe
- Conference: 1st Campbell
- 1988–89 record: 54–17–9
- Home record: 32–4–4
- Road record: 22–13–5
- Goals for: 354
- Goals against: 226

Team information
- General manager: Cliff Fletcher
- Coach: Terry Crisp
- Captain: Lanny McDonald and Jim Peplinski
- Alternate captains: Tim Hunter
- Arena: Olympic Saddledome
- Average attendance: 19,458

Team leaders
- Goals: Joe Mullen and Joe Nieuwendyk (51)
- Assists: Joe Mullen and Doug Gilmour (59)
- Points: Joe Mullen (110)
- Penalty minutes: Tim Hunter (375)
- Wins: Mike Vernon (37)
- Goals against average: Mike Vernon (2.65)

The 1988–89 Calgary Flames season was the ninth season for the Calgary Flames and 17th for the Flames franchise in the National Hockey League (NHL). They won their second consecutive Presidents' Trophy as the NHL's top regular season club and went on to win the first Stanley Cup championship in franchise history, defeating the Montreal Canadiens in the 1989 Stanley Cup Final. Al MacInnis won the Conn Smythe Trophy as the most valuable player of the playoffs.

The regular season saw the debut of Theoren Fleury, who went on to become the Flames' all-time leading scorer (since surpassed by Jarome Iginla), and Sergei Pryakhin, who became the first Soviet player allowed to play in the NHL. Four players represented the Flames at the 1989 All-Star Game: Gary Suter, Joe Nieuwendyk, Joe Mullen and Mike Vernon. Mullen received several awards following the season. He was named the winner of the Lady Byng Memorial Trophy for gentlemanly conduct, won the Emery Edge Award for having the top plus-minus in the league and was named a first team All-Star.

Co-captain Lanny McDonald scored his 1,000th point and 500th goal late in the season. He ended his Hockey Hall of Fame career by scoring a goal in the game that clinched the Stanley Cup before announcing his retirement in the summer.

== Regular season ==
The Flames' season began with a major trade. Mike Bullard finished the 1987–88 season second in team scoring at 103 points, but his disappointing performance during the playoffs left general manager Cliff Fletcher desiring a trade. Late in the summer, he dealt Bullard, and two players to the St. Louis Blues for a package of four players that was led by Doug Gilmour, who had scored 105 points two years previous.

Head Coach Terry Crisp favoured a defensively responsible system, and as a result, the Flames had given up the fewest goals in the league after two months while goaltenders Mike Vernon and Rick Wamsley were first and third in the NHL respectively in goals against average (GAA). The team maintained its defensive focus throughout the season, allowing 79 fewer goals – just under one per game less – than in 1987–88, surrendering a franchise record low total of 226.

Fletcher proclaimed in December that this Flames team was the best he had ever built. Calgary lost just four of its first 28 games, and on December 8 set a franchise record with its 13th consecutive game without a loss in a 5–3 victory over the Edmonton Oilers. The team also went unbeaten in its first 17 home games, compiling a 14–0–3 record in that time that featured victories of 11–4 over the Los Angeles Kings, 6–1 over the St. Louis Blues and 9–0 over the Hartford Whalers.

Though the Flames were established as the Smythe Division leaders, the team struggled around the Christmas break. After winning only one of five games towards the end of December, the team recalled two players from their minor league affiliate, the Salt Lake Golden Eagles. Paul Ranheim was brought up on December 27, but played only five games in Calgary. Theoren Fleury was brought up on January 1. He was leading the International Hockey League in scoring with 74 points in 40 games at the time of his recall, and immediately became a fan favourite in Calgary for his aggressive style despite his small, 5' 6" stature. Fleury scored three assists in his second career game, and his first two goals in his third, a 7–2 victory over the Edmonton Oilers.

Four players were chosen to represent the Flames at the 40th National Hockey League All-Star Game in Edmonton. Mike Vernon was the winning goaltender in the Campbell Conference's 9–5 victory, while forwards Joe Mullen and Joe Nieuwendyk, and defenceman Gary Suter also played in the game.

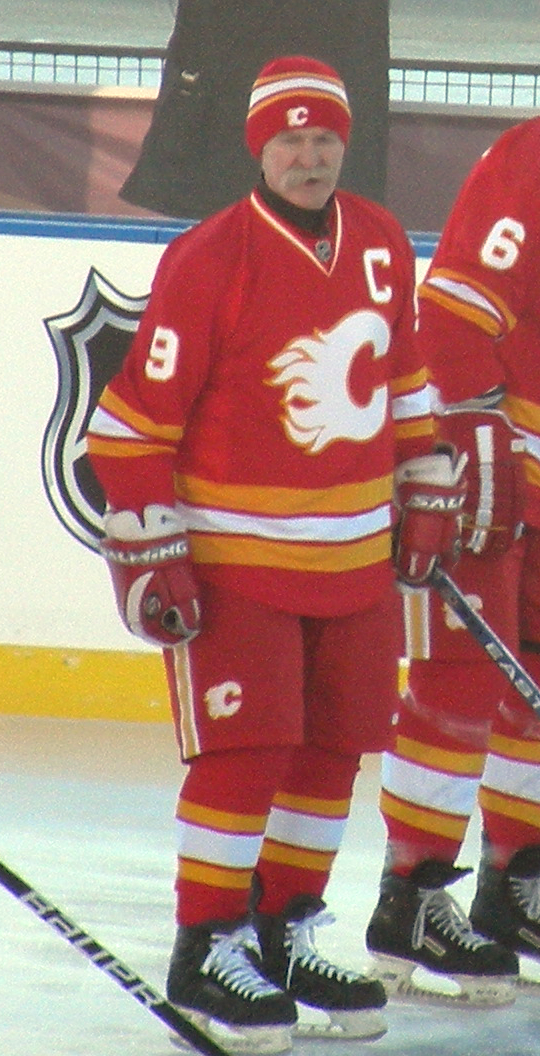
Lanny McDonald scored the 1,000th point and 500th goal of his NHL career late in the season.

Co-captain Lanny McDonald, a veteran of 16 NHL seasons, reached two of the league's most important milestones late in the season. He scored a goal against Bob Essensa of the Winnipeg Jets on March 7 to score the 1,000th point of his NHL career. Two weeks later, on March 21, McDonald scored his 500th goal against Mark Fitzpatrick in a 4–1 victory over the New York Islanders in Calgary.

On the same night that McDonald scored his 500th, Joe Nieuwendyk scored his 50th goal of the season, becoming the third player in NHL history after Mike Bossy and Wayne Gretzky to reach the 50-goal mark in his first two seasons. Nieuwendyk scored his 100th career goal in just his 144th game. He reached the milestone in the third fewest games in league history, behind Mike Bossy (129 games) and Maurice Richard (134 games).

Joe Mullen also topped 50 goals for the Flames. He finished seventh in league scoring with 110 points, and broke Jimmy Carson's NHL record for most points in a season by an American-born player.

The Flames made NHL history when they successfully completed a deal with the Soviet Ice Hockey Federation that allowed 25-year-old forward Sergei Pryakhin to become the first Soviet player permitted by his native federation to play in the NHL. Pryakhin made his debut on March 31 in a game against the Winnipeg Jets.

The Flames finished the season with 54 wins, a franchise record, and became the fifth team in NHL history to win 50 games in a season after the Montreal Canadiens, Boston Bruins, Philadelphia Flyers and Edmonton Oilers. Calgary was nearly unbeatable on home ice, winning 32 of 40 games, and losing just four. They won their second consecutive Presidents' Trophy as the top regular season team in the NHL.

The Flames finished first in the League in penalty-killing percentage, with 82.93%.

=== Season standings ===
Smythe Division
	GP	W	L	T	GF	GA	Pts
**Calgary Flames**	80	54	17	9	354	226	117
**Los Angeles Kings**	80	42	31	7	376	335	91
**Edmonton Oilers**	80	38	34	8	325	306	84
**Vancouver Canucks**	80	33	39	8	251	253	74
Winnipeg Jets	80	26	42	12	300	355	64

Note: GP = Games played, W = Wins, L = Losses, T = Ties, Pts = Points, GF = Goals for, GA = Goals against
Note: Teams that qualified for the playoffs are highlighted in bold.

=== Record vs. opponents ===
==== Vs. Campbell Conference ====
**Vs. Smythe Division**

1988–89 NHL records
Team	**CGY**	**EDM**	**LAK**	**VAN**	**WIN**	**Total**
Calgary	—	5–2–1	6–2	5–1–2	5–2–1	**21–8–4**
Edmonton	2–5–1	—	4–4	3–5	4–3–1	**13–17–2**
Los Angeles	2–6	4–4	—	4–4	2–2–4	**12–16–4**
Vancouver	1–5–2	5–3	4–4	—	3–4–1	**13–16–3**
Winnipeg	2–5–1	3–4–1	2–2–4	4–3–1	—	**11–14–7**

**Vs. Norris Division**

1988–89 NHL records
Team	**CHI**	**DET**	**MIN**	**STL**	**TOR**	**Total**
Calgary	3–0	3–0	2–0–1	3–0	0–1–2	**11–1–3**
Edmonton	0–2–1	1–2	1–0–2	3–0	3–0	**8–4–3**
Los Angeles	3–0	3–0	2–1	1–2	3–0	**12–3–0**
Vancouver	2–1	0–0–3	1–2	3–0	1–2	**7–5–3**
Winnipeg	0–3	0–2–1	1–2	1–1–1	3–0	**5–8–2**

Vs. Wales Conference

**Vs. Adams Division**

1988–89 NHL records
Team	**BOS**	**BUF**	**HFD**	**MTL**	**QUE**	**Total**
Calgary	2–1	1–2	2–1	1–2	2–1	**8–7–0**
Edmonton	0–3	2–0–1	2–1	1–2	3–0	**8–6–1**
Los Angeles	1–2	3–0	2–1	0–3	3–0	**9–6–0**
Vancouver	1–2	2–1	1–1–1	0–3	2–1	**6–8–1**
Winnipeg	1–2	1–2	1–2	1–2	1–2	**5–10–0**

**Vs. Patrick Division**

1988–89 NHL records
Team	**NJD**	**NYI**	**NYR**	**PHI**	**PIT**	**WSH**	**Total**
Calgary	3–0	2–0–1	2–1	3–0	2–1	2–0–1	**14–2–2**
Edmonton	1–2	2–1	2–1	1–0–2	2–1	1–2	**9–7–2**
Los Angeles	1–0–2	2–1	1–2	2–1	2–1	1–1–1	**9–6–3**
Vancouver	1–1–1	1–2	0–3	3–0	1–2	1–2	**7–10–1**
Winnipeg	1–0–2	1–2	1–2	0–2–1	1–2	1–2	**5–10–3**

== Schedule and results ==
1988–89 regular season
October: 6–3–3 (home: 5–0–2; road: 1–3–1)

#	Date	Visitor	Score	Home	OT	Record	Points
1	October 6	NY Islanders	4 – 4	Calgary	OT	0–0–1	1
2	October 8	Calgary	5 – 6	Los Angeles	OT	0–1–1	1
3	October 10	Detroit	2 – 5	Calgary		1–1–1	3
4	October 14	Edmonton	1 – 6	Calgary		2–1–1	5
5	October 17	Los Angeles	4 – 11	Calgary		3–1–1	7
6	October 19	Minnesota	1 – 2	Calgary		4–1–1	9
7	October 22	Calgary	3 – 3	Toronto	OT	4–1–2	10
8	October 23	Calgary	5 – 4	Philadelphia	OT	5–1–2	12
9	October 25	Calgary	1 – 6	Pittsburgh		5–2–2	12
10	October 28	Washington	2 – 2	Calgary	OT	5–2–3	13
11	October 30	Calgary	1 – 2	Vancouver		5–3–3	13
12	October 31	Chicago	3 – 6	Calgary		6–3–3	15

November: 10–1–1 (home: 5–0–1; road: 5–1–0)

#	Date	Visitor	Score	Home	OT	Record	Points
13	November 3	St. Louis	1 – 6	Calgary		7–3–3	17
14	November 5	Buffalo	0 – 9	Calgary		8–3–3	19
15	November 7	Hartford	3 – 6	Calgary		9–3–3	21
16	November 9	Calgary	2 – 3	Buffalo		9–4–3	21
17	November 10	Calgary	3 – 2	Philadelphia	OT	10–4–3	23
18	November 12	Calgary	2 – 1	Boston		11–4–3	25
19	November 15	Calgary	5 – 1	NY Islanders		12–4–3	27
20	November 17	Calgary	5 – 3	New Jersey		13–4–3	29
21	November 19	Calgary	5 – 2	Hartford		14–4–3	31
22	November 23	New Jersey	2 – 3	Calgary		15–4–3	33
23	November 26	Los Angeles	1 – 4	Calgary		16–4–3	35
24	November 29	Vancouver	3 – 3	Calgary	OT	16–4–4	36

December: 8–4–2 (home: 4–1–1; road: 4–3–1)

#	Date	Visitor	Score	Home	OT	Record	Points
25	December 1	NY Rangers	3 – 6	Calgary		17–4–4	38
26	December 2	Calgary	7 – 4	Edmonton		18–4–4	40
27	December 4	Calgary	6 – 3	Winnipeg		19–4–4	42
28	December 6	Quebec	2 – 3	Calgary		20–4–4	44
29	December 8	Edmonton	3 – 5	Calgary		21–4–4	46
30	December 10	Calgary	1 – 4	Hartford		21–5–4	46
31	December 12	Calgary	4 – 4	Toronto	OT	21–5–5	47
32	December 15	Vancouver	0 – 2	Calgary		22–5–5	49
33	December 16	Calgary	5 – 3	Vancouver		23–5–5	51
34	December 20	Calgary	3 – 7	Los Angeles		23–6–5	51
35	December 23	Calgary	1 – 4	Edmonton		23–7–5	51
36	December 26	Calgary	3 – 2	Vancouver	OT	24–7–5	53
37	December 29	Montreal	4 – 3	Calgary		24–8–5	53
38	December 31	Winnipeg	4 – 4	Calgary	OT	24–8–6	54

January: 10–3–2 (home: 6–0–1; road: 4–3–1)

#	Date	Visitor	Score	Home	OT	Record	Points
39	January 3	Quebec	1 – 5	Calgary		25–8–8	56
40	January 5	Los Angeles	6 – 8	Calgary		26–8–6	58
41	January 7	Edmonton	2 – 7	Calgary		27–8–6	60
42	January 8	Calgary	0 – 6	Edmonton		27–9–6	60
43	January 11	Winnipeg	3 – 8	Calgary		28–9–6	62
44	January 14	Minnesota	1 – 1	Calgary	OT	28–9–7	63
45	January 15	Calgary	2 – 3	Buffalo		28–10–7	63
46	January 17	Calgary	7 – 1	Detroit		29–10–7	65
47	January 19	Calgary	7 – 2	Boston		30–10–7	67
48	January 21	Calgary	3 – 4	Quebec		30–11–7	67
49	January 23	Calgary	3 – 1	Montreal		31–11–7	69
50	January 26	NY Rangers	3 – 5	Calgary		32–11–7	71
51	January 28	Chicago	4 – 5	Calgary	OT	33–11–7	73
52	January 29	Calgary	4 – 4	Vancouver	OT	33–11–8	74
53	January 31	Calgary	8 – 5	Los Angeles		34–11–8	76

February: 10–3–0 (home: 6–2–0; road: 4–1–0)

#	Date	Visitor	Score	Home	OT	Record	Points
54	February 2	Detroit	2 – 3	Calgary		35–11–8	78
55	February 4	Vancouver	2 – 5	Calgary		36–11–8	80
56	February 5	Vancouver	4 – 5	Calgary		37–11–8	82
57	February 9	Calgary	5 – 3	St. Louis		38–11–8	84
58	February 11	Calgary	2 – 1	Washington		39–11–8	86
59	February 12	Calgary	4 – 2	Pittsburgh		40–11–8	88
60	February 15	Calgary	6 – 1	Winnipeg		41–11–8	90
61	February 18	Boston	4 – 3	Calgary		41–12–8	90
62	February 20	Washington	2 – 6	Calgary		42–12–8	92
63	February 22	Toronto	4 – 3	Calgary	OT	42–13–8	92
64	February 24	St. Louis	3 – 4	Calgary		43–13–8	94
65	February 26	Calgary	0 – 1	Winnipeg		43–14–8	94
66	February 27	Philadelphia	3 – 6	Calgary		44–14–8	96

March: 9–3–1 (home: 5–1–0; road: 4–2–1)

#	Date	Visitor	Score	Home	OT	Record	Points
67	March 2	Montreal	2 – 3	Calgary		44–15–8	96
68	March 7	Winnipeg	5 – 9	Calgary		45–15–8	98
69	March 9	Pittsburgh	3 – 10	Calgary		46–15–8	100
70	March 11	Calgary	5 – 5	Edmonton	OT	46–15–9	101
71	March 13	Calgary	3 – 4	NY Rangers		46–16–9	101
72	March 14	Calgary	5 – 1	New Jersey		47–16–9	103
73	March 18	Calgary	9 – 3	Los Angeles		48–16–9	105
74	March 21	NY Islanders	1 – 4	Calgary		49–16–9	107
75	March 23	Los Angeles	2 – 4	Calgary		50–16–9	109
76	March 24	Calgary	3 – 4	Winnipeg	OT	50–17–9	109
77	March 26	Calgary	7 – 5	Chicago		51–17–9	111
78	March 27	Calgary	3 – 2	Minnesota		52–17–9	113
79	March 31	Winnipeg	1 – 4	Calgary		53–17–9	115

April: 1–0–0 (home: 1–0–0; road: 0–0–0)

#	Date	Visitor	Score	Home	OT	Record	Points
80	April 2	Edmonton	2 – 4	Calgary		54–17–9	117

Legend: Win (2 points) Loss (0 points) Tie (1 point)

== Playoffs ==
Though they finished 43 points behind the Flames in the regular season, the Vancouver Canucks proved a significant challenge in the Smythe Division semi-final. Calgary produced an uninspired effort in the opening game that resulted in a 4–3 loss as former Flame Paul Reinhart scored the winner for Vancouver in overtime. The Flames rebounded with 5–2 and 4–0 victories, but the Canucks continued to battle. Vancouver won the game 4 and after losing the fifth, staved off elimination with a 6–3 victory in game six, setting up a seventh and deciding game.

Game 7 went to overtime, tied 3–3, and the extra period was dominated by fast offensive rushes as both teams sought to end the series. Both goaltenders were forced to make spectacular saves, highlighted by Mike Vernon's glove save to stop Vancouver's Stan Smyl on a breakaway. That save was a defining moment of Vernon's career, and has since been called "the save that won the Cup". With less than a minute remaining in the first overtime period, Jim Peplinski fired a wide-angle shot towards the Vancouver goal that deflected off Joel Otto's skate and into the net, winning the game and series for the Flames.

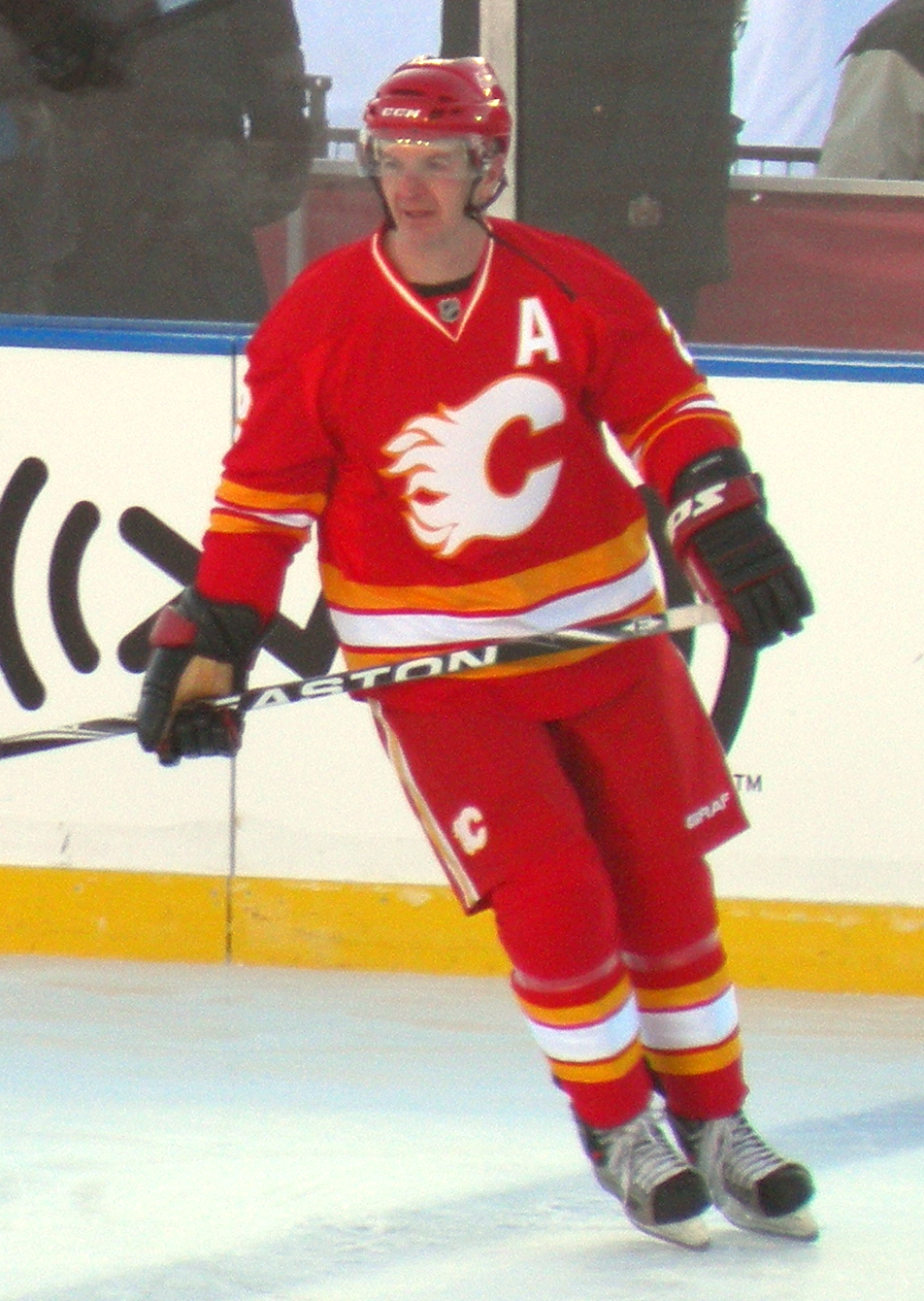
Al MacInnis was named the most valuable player of the playoffs after becoming the first defenceman to lead the post-season in scoring.

Calgary faced Wayne Gretzky and the Los Angeles Kings in the Smythe Division final. The Flames won the series in four straight, holding the highest scoring team in the league to 11 goals for the series. The Smythe final was most remembered for a controversial goal the Flames scored in the second game at Calgary. Vernon was knocked down in his crease by the Kings' Bernie Nicholls, and believing the goaltender was injured, Flames' trainer Bearcat Murray jumped onto the ice to tend to the fallen player as the Flames rushed the puck into the Los Angeles zone. Al MacInnis scored on the play as the Kings vehemently protested the goal should have been disallowed because Murray was on the ice. The goal stood and ended up the winning goal in an 8–3 victory.

The Chicago Blackhawks were the Flames' opponents in the Campbell Conference final. The Flames won the series with relative ease, dropping only a 4–2 decision in the second game en route to a five-game series victory. Calgary won their second Clarence S. Campbell Bowl in franchise history as conference champions, and advanced to the Stanley Cup championship to face the Montreal Canadiens in a rematch of the 1986 Final.

The final opened in Calgary where the Flames emerged with a 3–2 win on the strength of two Al MacInnis goals before Montreal evened the series with a 4–2 victory in game two. The third game, in Montreal, went to overtime with the score tied 3–3. Late in the second extra period, Calgary's Mark Hunter was penalized for boarding, allowing Montreal to win the game at 38:08 of overtime. The penalty call was controversial, and members of the press spent the following days arguing the legitimacy of the call.

The Flames entered the pivotal fourth game believing it was key to maintaining their chances of winning the title. Colin Patterson referred to it as being a "do-or-you're-gonna-die game". Calgary emerged with a 4–2 victory to even the series at two wins apiece heading back home for game five. The Flames rushed out to a 3–1 first period lead in the fifth game, and though Montreal scored in the second period to close within one goal, Vernon prevented Montreal from tying the game, and the Flames took a 3–2 series lead.

For the sixth game, coach Terry Crisp added 36-year-old Lanny McDonald to the lineup after sitting him out the previous three games. The veteran forward was the sentimental favourite to win the Cup, and Crisp wanted to give him the opportunity to win the title on the ice. The move paid dividends as after serving a penalty in the second period, McDonald stepped out of the penalty box and joined the rush where he took a pass from Joe Nieuwendyk and shot it over Montreal goaltender Patrick Roy to give the Flames a 2–1 lead. Doug Gilmour added two third period goals, including the eventual winner, as the Flames won the Stanley Cup by a 4–2 score. In doing so, they became the only team to ever defeat the Canadiens on Montreal Forum ice to win the championship.

Al MacInnis was named the Conn Smythe Trophy winner as the most valuable player of the playoffs, and with 31 points became the first defenceman to lead the league in post-season scoring. He finished with a 17-game scoring streak, the longest by a defenceman in NHL history.

Lanny McDonald announced his retirement on August 28, 1989, ending his career with the Stanley Cup championship. The Flames named him their vice president in charge of corporate and community affairs. Three years later, McDonald was inducted into the Hockey Hall of Fame. Hakan Loob also ended his NHL career as a champion; he had announced during the season that he intended to return to his home in Sweden at the end of the year.

1989 Stanley Cup playoffs
Smythe Division Semifinal vs. Vancouver – Flames win 4–3

#	Date	Visitor	Score	Home	OT	Series
1	April 5	Vancouver	4 – 3	Calgary	OT	Vancouver leads 1–0
2	April 6	Vancouver	2 – 5	Calgary		Series tied 1–1
3	April 8	Calgary	4 – 0	Vancouver		Calgary leads 2–1
4	April 9	Calgary	3 – 5	Vancouver		Series tied 2–2
5	April 11	Vancouver	0 – 4	Calgary		Calgary leads 3–2
6	April 13	Calgary	3 – 6	Vancouver		Series tied 3–3
7	April 15	Vancouver	3 – 4	Calgary	OT	Calgary wins 4–3

Smythe Division Final vs. Los Angeles – Flames win 4–0

#	Date	Visitor	Score	Home	OT	Series
1	April 18	Los Angeles	3 – 4	Calgary	OT	Calgary leads 1–0
2	April 20	Los Angeles	3 – 8	Calgary		Calgary leads 2–0
3	April 22	Calgary	5 – 2	Los Angeles		Calgary leads 3–0
4	April 24	Calgary	5 – 3	Los Angeles		Calgary wins 4–0

Campbell Conference Final vs. Chicago – Flames win 4–1

#	Date	Visitor	Score	Home	OT	Series
1	May 2	Chicago	0 – 3	Calgary		Calgary leads 1–0
2	May 4	Chicago	4 – 2	Calgary		Series tied 1–1
3	May 6	Calgary	5 – 2	Chicago		Calgary leads 2–1
4	May 8	Calgary	2 – 1	Chicago	OT	Calgary leads 3–1
5	May 10	Chicago	1 – 3	Calgary		Calgary wins 4–1

Stanley Cup Final vs. Montreal – Flames win 4–2

#	Date	Visitor	Score	Home	OT	Series
1	May 14	Montreal	2 – 3	Calgary		Calgary leads 1–0
2	May 17	Montreal	4 – 2	Calgary		Series tied 1–1
3	May 19	Calgary	3 – 4	Montreal	2OT	Montreal leads 2–1
4	May 21	Calgary	4 – 2	Montreal		Series tied 2–2
5	May 23	Montreal	2 – 3	Calgary		Calgary leads 3–2
6	May 25	Calgary	4 – 2	Montreal		Calgary wins 4–2

Legend: Win Loss

== Player statistics ==
=== Skaters ===
Note: Pos = Position; GP = Games played; G = Goals; A = Assists; Pts = Points; PIM = Penalty minutes; +/- = Plus/minus; PPG = Power-play goals; SHG = Short-handed goals; GWG = Game-winning goals

Regular season

Player	GP	G	A	Pts	PIM
Joe Mullen	79	51	59	110	16
Håkan Loob	79	27	58	85	44
Doug Gilmour	72	26	59	85	44
Joe Nieuwendyk	77	51	31	82	40
Al MacInnis	79	16	58	74	126
Gary Suter	63	13	48	62	78
Jiri Hrdina	70	22	32	54	26
Joel Otto	72	23	30	53	213
Gary Roberts	71	22	16	38	250
Colin Patterson	74	14	24	38	56
Jim Peplinski	79	13	25	38	241
Theoren Fleury	36	14	20	34	46
Mark Hunter	66	22	8	30	194
Jamie Macoun	72	8	19	27	76
Brad McCrimmon	72	5	17	22	96
Dana Murzyn	63	3	19	22	142
Lanny McDonald	51	11	7	18	26
Rob Ramage	68	3	13	16	156
Tim Hunter	75	3	9	12	375
Ric Nattress	38	1	8	9	47
Perry Berezan^{‡}	35	4	4	8	23
Brian MacLellan^{†}	12	2	3	5	14
Mike Vernon	52	0	4	4	18
Rick Lessard	6	0	1	1	2
Ken Sabourin	6	0	1	1	26
Brian Glynn	9	0	1	1	19
Rick Wamsley	35	0	1	1	8
Rich Chernomaz	1	0	0	0	0
Stu Grimson	1	0	0	0	5
Sergei Pryakhin	2	0	0	0	2
Dave Reierson	2	0	0	0	2
Paul Ranheim	5	0	0	0	0
Shane Churla^{‡}	5	0	0	0	25

Playoffs

Player	GP	G	A	Pts	PIM
Al MacInnis	22	7	24	31	46
Joe Mullen	21	16	8	24	4
Doug Gilmour	22	11	11	22	20
Joel Otto	22	6	13	19	46
Håkan Loob	22	8	9	17	4
Joe Nieuwendyk	22	10	4	14	10
Colin Patterson	22	3	10	13	24
Gary Roberts	22	5	7	12	57
Rob Ramage	20	1	11	12	26
Theoren Fleury	22	5	6	11	24
Jamie Macoun	22	3	6	9	30
Jim Peplinski	20	1	6	7	75
Brian MacLellan	21	3	2	5	19
Mark Hunter	10	2	2	4	23
Lanny McDonald	14	1	3	4	29
Tim Hunter	19	0	4	4	32
Gary Suter	5	0	3	3	10
Ric Nattress	19	0	3	3	20
Dana Murzyn	21	0	3	3	20
Brad McCrimmon	22	0	3	3	30
Sergei Pryakhin	1	0	0	0	0
Ken Sabourin	1	0	0	0	0
Rick Wamsley	1	0	0	0	0
Jiri Hrdina	4	0	0	0	0
Mike Vernon	22	0	0	0	14

^{†}Denotes player spent time with another team before joining Calgary. Statistics reflect time with the Flames only.
^{‡}Traded mid-season

=== Goaltenders ===
Note: Pos = Position;GP = Games played; Min, TOI = Minutes played; W = Wins; L = Losses; T,T/OT = Ties; OTL = Overtime losses; GA = Goals-against; GAA = Goals-against average; SO = Shutouts; SA = Shots against; SV = Shots saved; SV% = Save percentage;

Regular season

Player	GP	Min	W	L	T	GA	SO	GAA
Mike Vernon	52	2938	37	6	5	130	0	2.65
Rick Wamsley	35	1927	17	11	4	95	2	2.96

Playoffs

Player	GP	Min	W	L	GA	SO	GAA
Mike Vernon	22	1381	16	5	52	3	2.26
Rick Wamsley	1	20	0	1	2	0	6.00

== Awards and honours ==
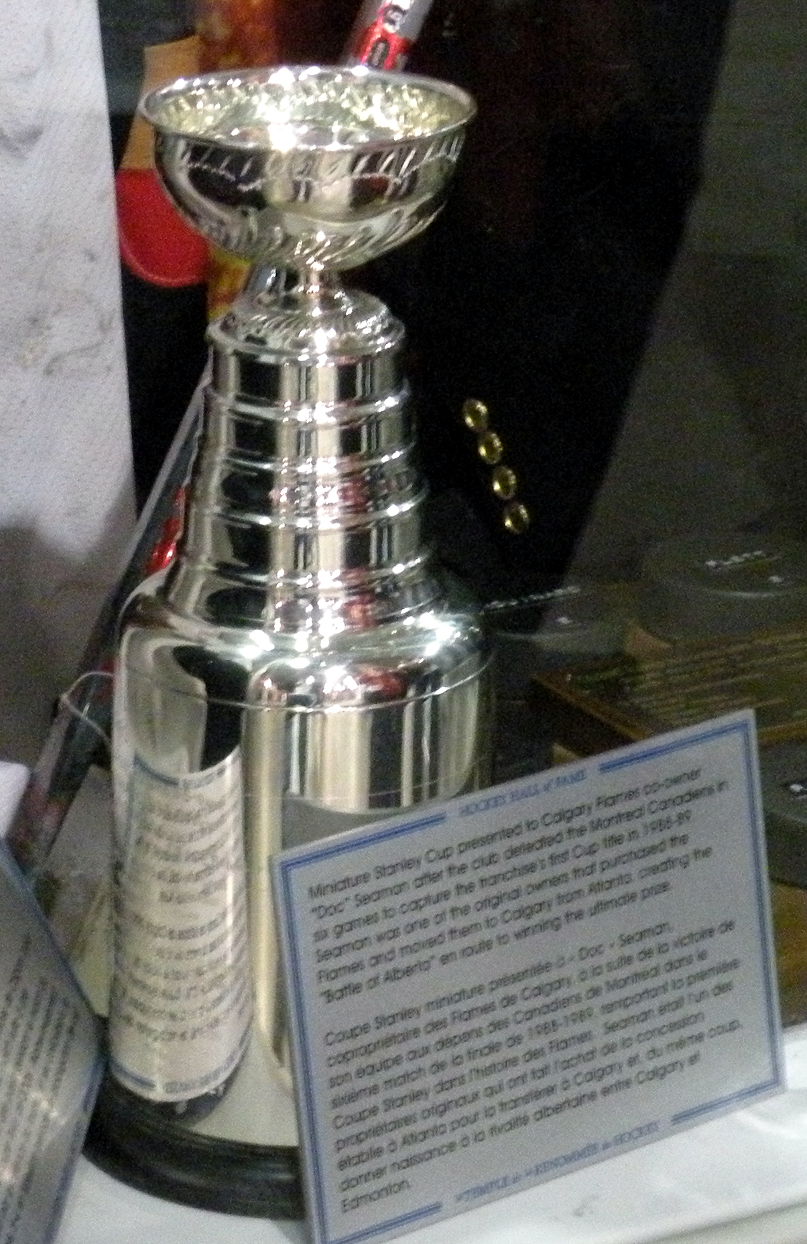
Replica of the Stanley Cup given to co-owner Doc Seaman.

Joe Mullen had the best season of his NHL career, recording personal bests in goals (51), assists (59) and points (110), and led all players in the playoffs with 16 goals. As a result, Mullen won numerous post-season awards. He won the Emery Edge Award for leading the league in plus-minus at +51, and captured the Lady Byng Memorial Trophy as the league's most gentlemanly player, earning only 16 penalties in minutes during the regular season. The Flames named him their winner of the Molson Cup for having the most three star selections on the team during the season, and he was named to the first All-Star team at centre by the league. Mike Vernon was named to the second All-Star team at goal, and Al MacInnis on defence. In addition to winning the Conn Smythe Trophy as the most valuable player of the playoffs, MacInnis was named a finalist for the James Norris Memorial Trophy as the league's top defenceman for the first time. Vernon was named a finalist for the Vezina Trophy as the league's top goaltender.

Nine members of the team have subsequently gained induction into the Hockey Hall of Fame. Six players – Lanny McDonald (1992), Joe Mullen (2000), Al MacInnis (2007), Joe Nieuwendyk (2011), Doug Gilmour (2011) and Mike Vernon (2023) – were joined by general manager Cliff Fletcher (2004) and two owners: Harley Hotchkiss (2006) and Doc Seaman (2011).

Player	Award
League awards
Al MacInnis	Conn Smythe Trophy
Joe Mullen	Lady Byng Memorial Trophy
Joe Mullen	Emery Edge Award
Joe Mullen	First team All-Star
Al MacInnis	Second Team All-Star
Mike Vernon	Second Team All-Star
Team awards
Joe Mullen	Molson Cup
Lanny McDonald	Ralph T. Scurfield Humanitarian Award

== Transactions ==
General manager Cliff Fletcher made two trades in the days leading to the start of training camp. Mike Bullard, who scored 103 points for the Flames the season previous, feared that the team was set to trade him, but admitted that he was still shocked when Calgary sent him to the St. Louis Blues along with Craig Coxe and a prospect on September 5, 1988. In return, the Flames received four players led by Doug Gilmour and Mark Hunter. The Flames then sent oft-injured defenceman Paul Reinhart to the Vancouver Canucks with Steve Bozek in exchange for a draft pick the following day. Calgary made the second deal to alleviate a glut of veteran players and to give young defencemen Brian Glynn and Dana Murzyn greater responsibility.

The Flames made one deal at the trade deadline, sending Shane Churla and Perry Berezan to the Minnesota North Stars for rugged winger Brian MacLellan and a draft pick. Calgary made the deal anticipating that MacLellan's size would help the team compete with some of their larger opponents within the Smythe Division, and benefit the Flames' power play.

=== Trades ===
September 5, 1988	To Calgary Flames Doug Gilmour; Mark Hunter; Steve Bozek; Mike Dark	To St. Louis Blues Mike Bullard; Craig Coxe; Tim Corkery
September 6, 1988	To Calgary Flames 3rd round pick in 1989 (Veli-Pekka Kautonen)	To Vancouver Canucks Paul Reinhart; Steve Bozek
January 6, 1989	To Calgary Flames Steve Guenette	To Pittsburgh Penguins 6th round pick in 1989 (Mike Needham)
March 4, 1989	To Calgary Flames Brian MacLellan; 4th round pick in 1989 (Robert Reichel)	To Minnesota North Stars Perry Berezan; Shane Churla

=== Subtractions ===
Subtractions
Player	New team	Via
John Tonelli	Los Angeles Kings	Free agency
Bob Bodak	Hartford Whalers	Free agency

== Draft picks ==
The Flames entered the 1988 NHL entry draft with the 21st overall pick by virtue of finishing with the best record in the NHL the year previous. They hoped to make a trade to acquire a pick in the top ten as the team coveted Martin Gelinas and Teemu Selanne. When Los Angeles selected Gelinas seventh overall, the Flames tried to pry the eighth pick from Chicago, but balked at the Blackhawks' demands. Chicago wanted Perry Berezan, another roster player and Calgary's first round selection in return. The Flames retained their original pick, and selected goaltender Jason Muzzatti as their first pick. In total, the Flames made 12 selections.

Of note for the Flames was their 12th round pick, Sergei Pryakhin. The Soviet Ice Hockey Federation was expected to provide a list of players it would be willing to release to play in North America ahead of the draft, but that expectation failed to materialize. Several Soviet players were drafted regardless, including Pryakhin. general manager Cliff Fletcher noted that Pryakhin had been dropped from the Soviet national team, and figured that decision could make him eligible to join the Flames. Fletcher was able to complete negotiations with Soviet officials for the player, and Pryakhin became the first Soviet player permitted to play in the NHL, making his debut in Calgary on March 31, 1989.

Rnd	Pick	Player	Nationality	Position	Team (league)	NHL statistics				
Rnd	Pick	Player	Nationality	Position	Team (league)	GP	G	A	Pts	PIM
1	21	Jason Muzzatti	Canada	G	Michigan State (CCHA)	62	13–25–10, 3.32GAA			
2	42	Todd Harkins	United States	C	Miami University (CCHA)	48	3	3	6	78
4	84	Gary Socha	United States	C	Tabor Academy					
5	85	Tomas Forslund	Sweden	RW	Leksands IF (SEL)	44	5	11	16	12
5	90	Scott Matusovich	United States	D	Canterbury High School					
6	126	Jonas Bergqvist	Sweden	RW	Leksands IF (SEL)	22	2	5	7	10
7	147	Stefan Nilsson	Sweden	LW	HV71 (SEL)					
8	168	Troy Kennedy	Canada	LW	Brandon Wheat Kings (WHL)					
9	189	Brett Petersen	United States	D	St. Paul Vulcans (USHL)					
10	210	Guy Darveau	Canada	D	Victoriaville Tigres (QMJHL)					
11	231	Dave Tretowicz	United States	D	Clarkson University (ECAC)					
12	252	Sergei Pryakhin	Soviet Union	RW	Krylja Sovetov (RSL)	46	3	8	11	2
S	26	Jerry Tarrant	United States	D	University of Vermont (ECAC)					
