= 1989 Stanley Cup Final =

1989 ice hockey championship series

	1	2	3	4	5	6	Total
Calgary Flames	3	2	3**	4	3	4	4
Montreal Canadiens	2	4	4**	2	2	2	2
- * – Denotes overtime period(s)
- Location(s): Calgary: Olympic Saddledome (1, 2, 5); Montreal: Montreal Forum (3, 4, 6)
- Coaches: Calgary: Terry Crisp; Montreal: Pat Burns
- Captains: Calgary: Lanny McDonald, Jim Peplinski; Montreal: Bob Gainey
- Referees: Kerry Fraser, Denis Morel, Andy Van Hellemond
- Dates: May 14–25, 1989
- MVP: Al MacInnis (Flames)
- Series-winning goal: Doug Gilmour (11:02, third)
- Hall of Famers: Flames: Doug Gilmour (2011); Al MacInnis (2007); Lanny McDonald (1992); Joe Mullen (2000); Joe Nieuwendyk (2011); Mike Vernon (2023); Canadiens: Guy Carbonneau (2019); Chris Chelios (2013); Bob Gainey (1992); Larry Robinson (1995); Patrick Roy (2006); Coaches: Pat Burns (2014); Officials: Ray Scapinello (2008); Andy Van Hellemond (1999)
- Networks: Canada: (English): CBC (French): SRC; United States: (English): SportsChannel America
- Announcers: (CBC) Bob Cole, Harry Neale, and Dick Irvin Jr. (SRC) Richard Garneau and Gilles Tremblay (SportsChannel America) Jiggs McDonald and Bill Clement

The 1989 Stanley Cup Final was the championship series of the National Hockey League's (NHL) 1988–89 season, and the culmination of the 1989 Stanley Cup playoffs. It was contested between the Calgary Flames and the Montreal Canadiens, the top two teams during the regular season. This was the second time in the decade after 1986 that the Canadiens and Flames met in the Finals. The 1989 series remains to date the last time that two Canadian teams faced each other for the Stanley Cup.

The Flames defeated the Canadiens in six games to win their first and only Stanley Cup. The winning goal in game six was scored by Doug Gilmour. They became the first team to win a Stanley Cup after relocating, as they had begun life as the Atlanta Flames in 1972. Since then, four more teams have accomplished this feat: the New Jersey Devils (formerly the Kansas City Scouts and Colorado Rockies), the Colorado Avalanche (formerly the Quebec Nordiques), the Dallas Stars (formerly the Minnesota North Stars), and the Carolina Hurricanes (formerly the New England/Hartford Whalers). This was also the second-to-last of eight consecutive Finals where either the Flames or their provincial rival Edmonton Oilers represented Alberta in the Stanley Cup Final and the second-to-last of nine consecutive Finals in which either the Flames or their Western Canada rivals represented that area in the Stanley Cup Final, as 1982 featured the Vancouver Canucks, the Flames' rivals in Western Canada. Both Calgary and Montreal were the only two teams to win the Stanley Cup in the 1980s other than the New York Islanders and the Edmonton Oilers. This was the first time since 1975 that the Cup was won by a team other than the Canadiens, the Islanders, or the Oilers. This was the Canadiens' first defeat in a Cup Finals since 1967. This was Patrick Roy's only Cup Finals where he was not on the winning side. He went on to win the 1993 Cup with the Canadiens and the 1996 and 2001 Cups with the Colorado Avalanche.

The 1989 Finals featured two coaches making their first appearances, as Calgary's Terry Crisp faced Montreal's Pat Burns. For Crisp it was his only appearance, while Burns returned one more time in 2003 where he led the Devils to their third Cup. In the interim between their two matches both teams had replaced their coaches; Crisp was hired to replace Bob Johnson after his departure following the 1986–87 season while Burns took over for 1986 Cup-winning coach Jean Perron after his 1988 firing. For Crisp, this was his third Stanley Cup championship in his career. He had already won two as a player with the Philadelphia Flyers in 1974 and 1975. Following the series, Bob Gainey, Rick Green, and Lanny McDonald retired, while long time defenceman Larry Robinson signed with the Los Angeles Kings, where he played the final three years of his career.

== Paths to the Finals ==
Calgary defeated the Vancouver Canucks 4–3, the Los Angeles Kings 4–0 and the Chicago Blackhawks 4–1 to advance to the Final.

Montreal defeated the Hartford Whalers 4–0, the Boston Bruins 4–1 and the Philadelphia Flyers 4–2.

== Game summaries ==
Co-captain Lanny McDonald scored the second Flames goal in game six. This turned out to be the last goal in his Hockey Hall of Fame career because he retired during the following off-season on August 28, 1989. It was also his only Stanley Cup victory. Jim Peplinski would also retire for the first time on October 31, 1989. Doug Gilmour scored two goals in the third period, including the eventual game and Cup winner to cement the victory for the Flames. Al MacInnis won the Conn Smythe Trophy as playoff MVP, and at 31 points, became the first defenceman to lead the NHL in post-season scoring. The Calgary Flames are the only visiting team to ever win the Stanley Cup by defeating the Montreal Canadiens at the Montreal Forum. The only other visiting team to win the Stanley Cup at the Montreal Forum was the New York Rangers, when they defeated the Montreal Maroons in 1928.

=== Game one ===
May 14	Montreal Canadiens	2–3	Calgary Flames	Olympic Saddledome	Recap

Scoring summary
Period	Team	Goal	Assist(s)	Time	Score
1st	MTL	Stephane Richer (6) – pp	Shayne Corson (5) and Chris Chelios (10)	02:43	1–0 MTL
1st	CGY	Al MacInnis (4) – pp	Joel Otto (8) and Joe Mullen (6)	06:51	1–1
1st	CGY	Al MacInnis (5)	Joel Otto (9) and Jim Peplinski (5)	08:33	2–1 CGY
1st	MTL	Larry Robinson (1)	Bobby Smith (7) and Mike Keane (2)	10:02	2–2
2nd	CGY	Theoren Fleury (5)	Shayne Corson (5) and Tim Hunter (3)	11:45	3–2 CGY
3rd	None				
Penalty summary
Period	Team	Player	Penalty	Time	PIM
1st	CGY	Jim Peplinski	Hooking	00:49	2:00
1st	MTL	Larry Robinson	Hooking	06:33	2:00
1st	MTL	Patrick Roy	Delay of game	10:29	2:00
1st	CGY	Doug Gilmour	Slashing	18:51	2:00
1st	MTL	Guy Carbonneau	Interference	18:51	2:00
1st	MTL	Brian Skrudland	Elbowing	19:22	2:00
2nd	CGY	Jim Peplinski	Cross-checking	06:07	2:00
2nd	MTL	Bobby Smith	Interference	06:15	2:00
2nd	CGY	Jamie Macoun	Tripping	07:32	2:00
2nd	CGY	Brad McCrimmon	Tripping	14:20	2:00
3rd	MTL	Craig Ludwig	Tripping	01:36	2:00
3rd	MTL	Bobby Smith	Misconduct	19:39	10:00

Shots by period
Team	1	2	3	Total
Montreal	6	16	9	31
Calgary	13	12	10	35

=== Game two ===
May 17	Montreal Canadiens	4–2	Calgary Flames	Olympic Saddledome	Recap

Scoring summary
Period	Team	Goal	Assist(s)	Time	Score
1st	MTL	Larry Robinson (2)	Mike McPhee (5) and Brian Skrudland (5)	04:18	1–0 MTL
2nd	MTL	Bobby Smith (9) – pp	Mike Keane (3) and Chris Chelios (11)	01:55	2–0 MTL
2nd	CGY	Joe Nieuwendyk (10)	Brian MacLellan (2)	05:14	2–1 MTL
2nd	CGY	Joel Otto (5) – pp	Joe Mullen (7) and Al MacInnis (20)	13:49	2–2
3rd	MTL	Chris Chelios (4)	Petr Svoboda (9) and Brian Skrudland (6)	08:01	3–2 MTL
3rd	MTL	Russ Courtnall (7)	Chris Chelios (12) and Petr Svoboda (10)	09:35	4–2 MTL
Penalty summary
Period	Team	Player	Penalty	Time	PIM
1st	CGY	Brad McCrimmon	Holding	02:13	2:00
1st	MTL	Brent Gilchrist	Cross-checking	05:31	2:00
1st	MTL	Chris Chelios	Roughing	07:15	2:00
1st	CGY	Jim Peplinski	Roughing	10:48	2:00
1st	MTL	Shayne Corson	Roughing	10:48	2:00
1st	CGY	Tim Hunter	Unsportsmanlike conduct	16:35	2:00
1st	MTL	Mike McPhee	Unsportsmanlike conduct	18:51	2:00
1st	CGY	Gary Roberts	Roughing	20:00	2:00
1st	MTL	Shayne Corson	Roughing	20:00	2:00
2nd	CGY	Dana Murzyn	Roughing	01:23	2:00
2nd	MTL	Brent Gilchrist	Hooking	02:58	2:00
2nd	MTL	Petr Svoboda	Elbowing	07:56	2:00
2nd	MTL	Brian Skrudland	Elbowing	13:32	2:00
2nd	CGY	Dana Murzyn	Tripping	16:07	2:00
2nd	MTL	Chris Chelios	Cross-checking	16:35	2:00
2nd	CGY	Brian MacLellan	Unsportsmanlike conduct	19:48	2:00
2nd	MTL	Mike McPhee	Unsportsmanlike conduct	19:48	2:00
3rd	CGY	Tim Hunter	Holding	02:31	2:00
3rd	MTL	Mike Keane	Holding	03:11	2:00
3rd	CGY	Gary Roberts	Holding	08:13	2:00
3rd	MTL	Mats Naslund	Elbowing	11:21	2:00
3rd	CGY	Joe Nieuwendyk	Roughing	13:19	2:00
3rd	MTL	Chris Chelios	Roughing	13:19	2:00

Shots by period
Team	1	2	3	Total
Montreal	11	4	8	23
Calgary	8	16	8	32

=== Game three ===
May 19	Calgary Flames	3–4	2OT	Montreal Canadiens	Montreal Forum	Recap

Scoring summary
Period	Team	Goal	Assist(s)	Time	Score
1st	MTL	Mike McPhee (4)	Unassisted	01:32	1–0 MTL
1st	CGY	Joe Mullen (12)	Brad McCrimmon (3) and Doug Gilmour (9)	17:15	1–1
2nd	CGY	Joe Mullen (13) – pp	Al MacInnis (3) and Theoren Fleury (6)	15:35	2–1 CGY
3rd	MTL	Bobby Smith (10)	Mats Naslund (10) and Petr Svoboda (11)	01:32	2–2
3rd	CGY	Doug Gilmour (8)	Tim Hunter (4)	13:02	3–2 CGY
3rd	MTL	Mats Naslund (4)	Unassisted	19:19	3–3
OT	None				
2OT	MTL	Ryan Walter (3)	Stephane Richer (5)	18:08	4–3 CGY
Penalty summary
Period	Team	Player	Penalty	Time	PIM
1st	CGY	Doug Gilmour	Hooking	00:34	2:00
1st	MTL	Chris Chelios	High-sticking	00:34	2:00
1st	CGY	Rob Ramage	High-sticking	02:57	2:00
1st	CGY	Mark Hunter	Roughing	06:42	2:00
1st	MTL	Craig Ludwig	Roughing	06:42	2:00
1st	CGY	Theoren Fleury	Cross-checking	07:10	2:00
1st	MTL	Petr Svoboda	Roughing	11:06	2:00
1st	CGY	Al MacInnis	Cross-checking	11:39	2:00
1st	MTL	Craig Ludwig	Elbowing	12:07	2:00
1st	MTL	Bobby Smith	Slashing	14:25	2:00
1st	CGY	Colin Patterson	Roughing	17:15	2:00
1st	MTL	Eric Desjardins	Roughing	17:15	2:00
1st	CGY	Al MacInnis	Unsportsmanlike conduct	20:00	2:00
1st	MTL	Brian Skrudland	Unsportsmanlike conduct	20:00	2:00
2nd	MTL	Guy Carbonneau	Hooking	00:49	2:00
2nd	CGY	Jamie Macoun	Holding	04:04	2:00
2nd	CGY	Brad McCrimmon	High-sticking	06:15	2:00
2nd	CGY	Jamie Macoun	Roughing	06:58	2:00
2nd	MTL	Brian Skrudland	Roughing	06:58	2:00
2nd	MTL	Brian Skrudland	Roughing	14:25	2:00
2nd	CGY	Rob Ramage	Holding	16:08	2:00
2nd	CGY	Rob Ramage	Unsportsmanlike conduct	16:08	2:00
2nd	CGY	Dana Murzyn	Unsportsmanlike conduct	19:00	2:00
2nd	MTL	Brian Skrudland	Unsportsmanlike conduct	19:00	2:00
3rd	CGY	Al MacInnis	High-sticking	10:00	2:00
3rd	MTL	Shayne Corson	Cross-checking	10:00	2:00
OT	CGY	Tim Hunter	Roughing	11:38	2:00
OT	MTL	Shayne Corson	High-sticking	11:38	2:00
OT	CGY	Al MacInnis	Roughing	16:09	2:00
OT	MTL	Bobby Smith	Roughing	16:09	2:00
OT	CGY	Mark Hunter	Unsportsmanlike conduct	17:34	2:00
OT	MTL	Brian Skrudland	Unsportsmanlike conduct	17:34	2:00
OT	CGY	Rob Ramage	Roughing	17:59	2:00
OT	MTL	Shayne Corson	Roughing	17:59	2:00
2OT	CGY	Al MacInnis	High-sticking	09:25	2:00
2OT	MTL	Bob Gainey	High-sticking	09:25	2:00
2OT	CGY	Mark Hunter	Boarding	16:08	2:00

Shots by period
Team	1	2	3	OT	2OT	Total
Calgary	13	7	8	5	4	37
Montreal	4	7	6	12	6	35

=== Game four ===
May 21	Calgary Flames	4–2	Montreal Canadiens	Montreal Forum	Recap

Scoring summary
Period	Team	Goal	Assist(s)	Time	Score
1st	None				
2nd	CGY	Doug Gilmour (9)	Unassisted	11:56	1–0 CGY
2nd	CGY	Joe Mullen (14) – pp	Al MacInnis (22) and Joel Otto (10)	17:15	2–0 CGY
3rd	MTL	Russ Courtnall (8)	Mike McPhee (6) and Chris Chelios (13)	10:59	2–1 CGY
3rd	CGY	Al MacInnis (6)	Joel Otto (11)	18:22	3–2 CGY
3rd	MTL	Claude Lemieux (3)	Larry Robinson (8)	19:33	3–2 CGY
3rd	CGY	Joe Mullen (15) – pp – en	Doug Gilmour (10) and Colin Patterson (10)	19:49	4–2 CGY
Penalty summary
Period	Team	Player	Penalty	Time	PIM
1st	MTL	Petr Svoboda	Hooking	05:44	2:00
1st	CGY	Al MacInnis	Roughing	09:46	2:00
1st	MTL	Mike Keane	Interference	11:07	2:00
1st	CGY	Rob Ramage	Roughing	15:19	2:00
1st	MTL	Guy Carbonneau	Hooking	18:03	2:00
1st	MTL	Bob Gainey	Slashing	18:19	2:00
2nd	CGY	Al MacInnis	Slashing	07:03	2:00
2nd	CGY	Doug Gilmour	Holding	09:47	2:00
2nd	MTL	Petr Svoboda	High-sticking	13:22	2:00
2nd	CGY	Colin Patterson	Cross-checking	15:38	2:00
2nd	MTL	Larry Robinson	Cross-checking	18:03	2:00
2nd	CGY	Joel Otto	Holding	19:56	2:00
3rd	MTL	Bench	Too many men on the ice	05:57	2:00
3rd	CGY	Jamie Macoun	High-sticking	12:47	2:00
3rd	CGY	Ric Nattress	Misconduct	12:47	10:00
3rd	MTL	Claude Lemieux	Slashing	19:33	2:00
3rd	CGY	Colin Patterson	High-sticking	19:49	2:00
3rd	CGY	Colin Patterson	Misconduct	19:49	10:00
3rd	MTL	Russ Courtnall	Misconduct	19:49	10:00
3rd	MTL	Stephane Richer	Misconduct	19:49	10:00

Shots by period
Team	1	2	3	Total
Calgary	13	9	13	35
Montreal	3	10	6	19

=== Game five ===
May 23	Montreal Canadiens	2–3	Calgary Flames	Olympic Saddledome	Recap

Scoring summary
Period	Team	Goal	Assist(s)	Time	Score
1st	CGY	Joel Otto (6)	Jim Peplinski (6) and Mark Hunter	00:28	1–0 CGY
1st	CGY	Joe Mullen (16)	Doug Gilmour (11) and Rob Ramage (10)	08:15	2–0 CGY
1st	MTL	Bobby Smith (11) – pp	Chris Chelios (14) and Mats Naslund (11)	13:24	2–1 CGY
1st	CGY	Al MacInnis (7) – pp	Rob Ramage (10) and Joel Otto (12)	19:31	3–1 CGY
2nd	MTL	Mike Keane (4)	Bobby Smith (8) and Bob Gainey (4)	14:17	3–2 CGY
3rd	None				
Penalty summary
Period	Team	Player	Penalty	Time	PIM
1st	MTL	Shayne Corson	Elbowing	02:31	2:00
1st	MTL	Ryan Walter	High-sticking	06:10	2:00
1st	CGY	Joe Mullen	Slashing	09:14	2:00
1st	CGY	Jim Peplinski	Holding	11:57	2:00
1st	CGY	Jim Peplinski	Boarding	13:50	2:00
1st	MTL	Rick Green	Interference	19:18	2:00
2nd	MTL	Claude Lemieux	Elbowing	18:20	2:00
3rd	CGY	Al MacInnis	Holding	08:40	2:00
3rd	MTL	Bobby Smith	Interference	09:32	2:00
3rd	CGY	Mike Vernon	Unsportsmanlike conduct	10:06	2:00
3rd	MTL	Claude Lemieux	Unsportsmanlike conduct	10:06	2:00
3rd	CGY	Brian MacLellan	Roughing	16:28	2:00
3rd	MTL	Shayne Corson	Roughing	16:28	2:00

Shots by period
Team	1	2	3	Total
Montreal	10	7	11	28
Calgary	10	13	5	28

=== Game six ===
May 25	Calgary Flames	4–2	Montreal Canadiens	Montreal Forum	Recap

Scoring summary
Period	Team	Goal	Assist(s)	Time	Score
1st	CGY	Colin Patterson (3)	Dana Murzyn (3) and Al MacInnis (23)	18:51	1–0 CGY
2nd	MTL	Claude Lemieux (4)	Brian Skrudland (7) and Chris Chelios (15)	01:23	1–1
2nd	CGY	Lanny McDonald (1)	Joe Nieuwendyk (4) and Hakan Loob (9)	04:24	2–1 CGY
3rd	CGY	Doug Gilmour (10) – pp	Joel Otto (3) and Al MacInnis (24)	11:02	3–1 CGY
3rd	MTL	Rick Green (1)	Mike McPhee (7) and Claude Lemieux (3)	11:53	3–2 CGY
3rd	CGY	Doug Gilmour (11) – en	Joe Mullen (8) and Jamie Macoun (6)	18:57	4–2 CGY
Penalty summary
Period	Team	Player	Penalty	Time	PIM
1st	CGY	Joe Mullen	Hooking	00:54	2:00
1st	MTL	Chris Chelios	Elbowing	05:09	2:00
1st	MTL	Mats Naslund	Interference	08:20	2:00
1st	CGY	Mark Hunter	Roughing	09:53	2:00
1st	MTL	Brian Skrudland	Roughing	09:53	2:00
1st	CGY	Dana Murzyn	Tripping	10:26	2:00
1st	CGY	Rob Ramage	Roughing	18:30	2:00
1st	CGY	Gary Roberts	Roughing	18:30	2:00
1st	MTL	Shayne Corson	Roughing	18:30	2:00
1st	CGY	Bobby Smith	Roughing	18:30	2:00
2nd	CGY	Lanny McDonald	Holding	02:13	2:00
2nd	CGY	Mark Hunter	Roughing	04:53	2:00
2nd	MTL	Ryan Walter	Roughing	04:53	2:00
2nd	CGY	Gary Roberts	Roughing	06:37	2:00
2nd	CGY	Mike Vernon	Roughing	06:37	2:00
2nd	MTL	Shayne Corson	Roughing	06:37	2:00
2nd	MTL	Craig Ludwig	Slashing	11:08	2:00
2nd	CGY	Ric Nattress	Hooking	16:36	2:00
3rd	CGY	Mark Hunter	Holding	02:17	2:00
3rd	MTL	Brian Skrudland	Roughing	02:17	2:00
3rd	MTL	Russ Courtnall	Boarding	10:46	2:00
3rd	CGY	Al MacInnis	Roughing	18:34	2:00
3rd	MTL	Claude Lemieux	Roughing	18:34	2:00
3rd	MTL	Claude Lemieux	Misconduct	18:34	10:00

Shots by period
Team	1	2	3	Total
Calgary	4	8	7	19
Montreal	9	7	6	22

== Broadcasting ==
This was the first Cup Finals since 1984 that the CBC had the sole English-language rights to the entire series in Canada instead of having to share it with another network. This was also the first season that SportsChannel America held the national U.S. rights.

== Team rosters ==
Years indicated in boldface under the "Finals appearance" column signify that the player won the Stanley Cup in the given year.

=== Calgary Flames ===
#	Nat	Player	Position	Hand	Acquired	Place of birth	Finals appearance
14	(Canada)	Theoren Fleury	RW	R	1987	Oxbow, Saskatchewan	first
39	(Canada)	Doug Gilmour	C	L	1988–89	Kingston, Ontario	first
17	(Czechoslovakia)	Jiri Hrdina	C	L	1984	Prague, Czechoslovakia	first
22	(Canada)	Mark Hunter	RW	R	1988–89	Petrolia, Ontario	first
19	(Canada)	Tim Hunter – **A**	RW	R	1979	Calgary, Alberta	second (1986)
12	(Sweden)	Hakan Loob	RW	R	1980	Visby, Sweden	second (1986)
2	(Canada)	Al MacInnis	D	R	1981	Inverness, Nova Scotia	second (1986)
27	(Canada)	Brian MacLellan	LW	L	1988–89	Guelph, Ontario	first
34	(Canada)	Jamie Macoun	D	L	1982–83	Newmarket, Ontario	second (1986)
4	(Canada)	Brad McCrimmon	D	L	1987–88	Dodsland, Saskatchewan	third (1985, 1987)
9	(Canada)	Lanny McDonald – **C**	RW	R	1981–82	Hanna, Alberta	second (1986)
7	(United States)	Joe Mullen	RW	R	1985–86	New York, New York	second (1986)
5	(Canada)	Dana Murzyn	D	L	1988–89	Calgary, Alberta	first
6	(Canada)	Ric Nattress	D	R	1987–88	Hamilton, Ontario	first
25	(Canada)	Joe Nieuwendyk	C	L	1985	Oshawa, Ontario	first
29	(United States)	Joel Otto	C	R	1984–85	Elk River, Minnesota	second (1986)
11	(Canada)	Colin Patterson	LW	R	1983–84	Rexdale, Ontario	second (1986)
24	(Canada)	Jim Peplinski – **C**	RW	R	1979	Renfrew, Ontario	second (1986)
55	(Canada)	Rob Ramage	D	R	1988–89	Byron, Ontario	first
10	(Canada)	Gary Roberts	LW	L	1984	North York, Ontario	second (1986)
20	(United States)	Gary Suter	D	L	1984	Madison, Wisconsin	second (1986)
30	(Canada)	Mike Vernon	G	L	1981	Calgary, Alberta	second (1986)
31	(Canada)	Rick Wamsley	G	L	1987–88	Simcoe, Ontario	first

=== Montreal Canadiens ===
#	Nat	Player	Position	Hand	Acquired	Place of birth	Finals appearance
21	(Canada)	Guy Carbonneau	C	R	1979	Sept-Îles, Quebec	second **(1986**)
24	(United States)	Chris Chelios	D	R	1981	Chicago, Illinois	second **(1986**)
27	(Canada)	Shayne Corson	C	L	1984	Midland, Ontario	first
6	(Canada)	Russ Courtnall	RW	R	1988–89	Duncan, British Columbia	first
28	(Canada)	Eric Desjardins	D	R	1987	Rouyn, Quebec	first
34	(Canada)	Donald Dufresne	D	R	1985	Quebec City, Quebec	first
23	(Canada)	Bob Gainey – **C**	LW	L	1973	Peterborough, Ontario	sixth (**1976**, **1977**, **1978**, **1979**, **1986**)
41	(Canada)	Brent Gilchrist	LW	L	1985	Moose Jaw, Saskatchewan	first
5	(Canada)	Rick Green	D	L	1982–83	Belleville, Ontario	second **(1986**)
1	(Canada)	Brian Hayward	G	L	1986–87	Georgetown, Ontario	first
12	(Canada)	Mike Keane	RW	R	1986–87	Winnipeg, Manitoba	first
32	(Canada)	Claude Lemieux	RW	R	1983	Buckingham, Quebec	second (**1986**)
17	(United States)	Craig Ludwig	D	L	1980	Rhinelander, Wisconsin	second **(1986**)
8	(United States)	Steve Martinson	RW	L	1988–89	Minnetonka, Minnesota	first
35	(Canada)	Mike McPhee	LW	L	1980	Sydney, Nova Scotia	second **(1986**)
26	(Sweden)	Mats Naslund – **A**	LW	L	1979	Timrå, Sweden	second **(1986**)
44	(Canada)	Stephane Richer	RW	R	1984	Ripon, Quebec	second **(1986**)
19	(Canada)	Larry Robinson – **A**	D	L	1971	Winchester, Ontario	seventh (**1973**, **1976**, **1977**, **1978**, **1979**, **1986**)
33	(Canada)	Patrick Roy	G	L	1984	Quebec City, Quebec	second **(1986**)
39	(Canada)	Brian Skrudland	C	L	1985–86	Peace River, Alberta	second **(1986**)
15	(Canada)	Bobby Smith	C	L	1983–84	North Sydney, Nova Scotia	third (1981, **1986**)
25	(Czechoslovakia)	Petr Svoboda	D	L	1984	Most, Czechoslovakia	second (**1986**)
11	(Canada)	Ryan Walter	LW	L	1982–83	New Westminster, British Columbia	second **(1986**)

== Stanley Cup engraving ==
The 1989 Stanley Cup was presented to Flames co-captains Lanny McDonald and Jim Peplinski, as well as alternate captain Tim Hunter by NHL President John Ziegler following the Flames 4–2 win over the Canadiens in game six.

The following Flames players and staff had their names engraved on the Stanley Cup

1988–89 Calgary Flames

=== Players ===
Centres

- 17 Jiri Hrdina
- 25 Joe Nieuwendyk
- 29 Joel Otto
- 39 Doug Gilmour

Wingers

- 7 Joe Mullen
- 9 Lanny McDonald (Co-Captain)
- 10 Gary Roberts
- 11 Colin Patterson
- 12 Hakan Loob
- 14 Theoren Fleury*
- 19 Tim Hunter (A)
- 22 Mark Hunter
- 24 Jim Peplinski (Co-Captain)
- 27 Brian MacLellan

Defencemen

- 2 Al MacInnis
- 4 Brad McCrimmon
- 5 Dana Murzyn
- 6 Ric Nattress
- 20 Gary Suter
- 34 Jamie Macoun
- 55 Rob Ramage

Goaltenders

- 30 Mike Vernon
- 31 Rick Wamsley
- * Played both centre and wing.

=== Coaching and administrative staff ===
- Norman Green (Owner), Harley Hotchkiss (Owners/Governor)
- Norman Kwong (Owner), Sonia Scurfield (Owner)
- Byron Seaman (Owner), Daryl Seaman (Owner)
- Cliff Fletcher (President/General Manager), Al MacNeil (Asst. General Manager)
- Al Coates (Asst. to President), Terry Crisp (Head Coach)
- Doug Risebrough (Asst. Coach), Tom Watt (Asst. Coach)
- Glenn Hall (Goaltending Consultant), Jim Murray (Trainer)
- Al Murray (Asst. Trainer), Bob Stewart (Equipment Manager)

=== Stanley Cup engraving ===
- #16 Sergei Pryakhin and #32 Ken Sabourin each played in a single playoff game, meaning that they did not qualify to have their names engraved on the Stanley Cup. However, both players received Stanley Cup championship rings, and Pryakhin was included in the team picture. Pryakhin was the first Russian-born and trained player to play in the NHL playoffs.
- Norman Kwong became the sixth person to get his name on both the Stanley Cup and Grey Cup. 1948 with the Calgary Stampeders and 1954, 1955, 1956 with Edmonton Eskimos. (See Joe Miller, Lionel Conacher, Carl Voss, Leo Dandurand, Harold Ballard & Wayne Gretzky who won both the Grey Cup and Stanley Cup.)
- Vice Presidents Clare Rhysen and Leo Ornest's names were left off the Stanley Cup, but both received a Stanley Cup championship ring.

== Stanley Cup Final Patch ==
The 1989 Stanley Cup Final was the first to feature a special commemorative patch on both teams' sweaters, in honor of the championship series. Placed on each player's left shoulder, the patch employed the same design that was used from 1989 to 1994 before being tweaked for the 1995 Finals. A commemorative patch has been issued in every Stanley Cup Final since, though subsequent patches were sewn onto the sweaters'` upper right breast area (with the only exceptions being the 1994 and 2014 New York Rangers, whose diagonal wordmark necessitated the patch's placement on the top of each sweater's left shoulder).

== Notes ==
Preceded by Edmonton Oilers; 1988	Calgary Flames; Stanley Cup champions 1989	Succeeded by Edmonton Oilers; 1990
