= Dana Murzyn =

Canadian ice hockey player (born 1966)

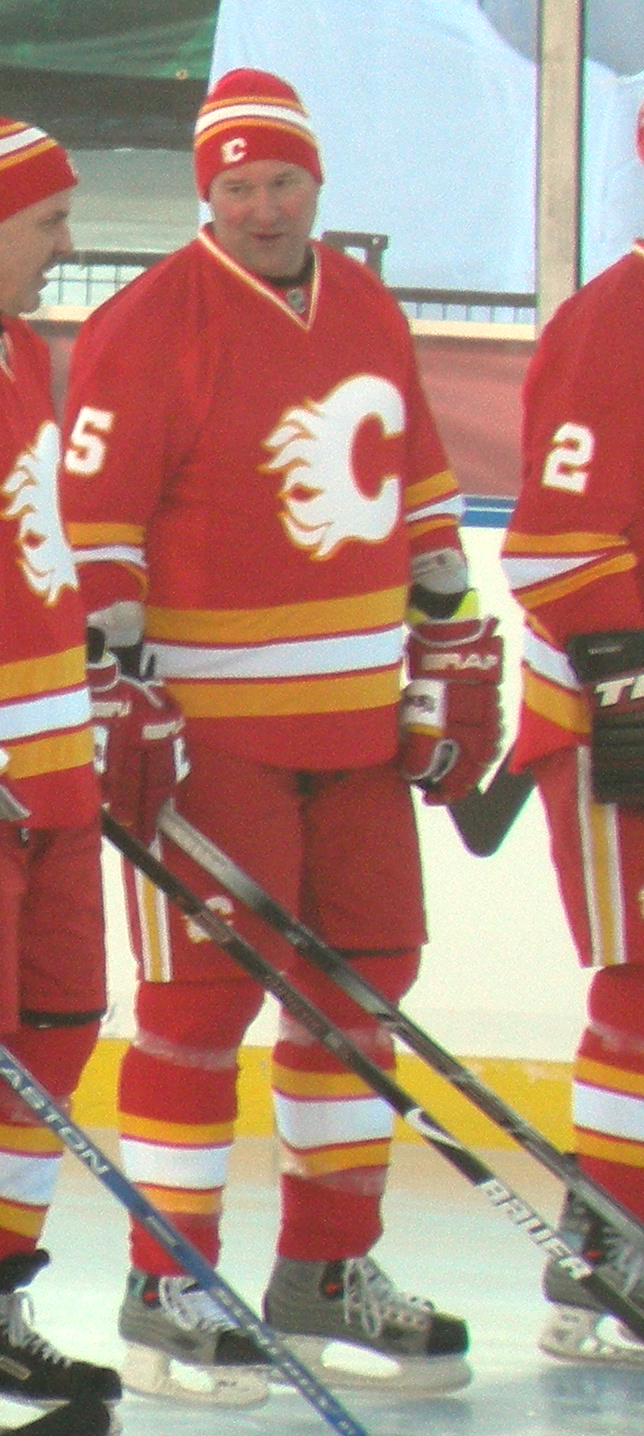
- Murzyn in 2011
- Born: December 9, 1966 (age 59) Calgary, Alberta, Canada
- Height: 6 ft 2 in (188 cm)
- Weight: 200 lb (91 kg; 14 st 4 lb)
- Position: Defence
- Shot: Left
- Played for: Hartford Whalers; Calgary Flames; Vancouver Canucks
- NHL draft: 5th overall, 1985; Hartford Whalers
- Playing career: 1985–1999

Dana Trevor Murzyn (born December 9, 1966) is a Canadian former professional ice hockey defenceman. Drafted out of the Western Hockey League (WHL), he was selected fifth overall by the Hartford Whalers in the 1985 NHL entry draft. He began his NHL career in 1985–86 with the Whalers and was named to the NHL All-Rookie Team. After being traded to the Calgary Flames in 1988, he won the Stanley Cup with the club in 1989. He was traded a second time in 1991 to the Vancouver Canucks, where he spent the majority of his career. Murzyn retired following the 1998–99 season after fourteen years in the NHL.

== Playing career ==
=== Junior ===
After playing in the Alberta Midget Hockey League (AMHL) with the Calgary Royals in 1981–82, Murzyn began his junior career with the Calgary Spurs of the Alberta Junior Hockey League (AJHL). He recorded seven goals and 27 points over 34 games in his only Junior A season.

In 1983–84, Murzyn joined the major junior ranks, playing in the WHL with the Calgary Wranglers for two seasons. After a 31-point rookie campaign in 1983–84, he enjoyed a highly prolific second year with the Wranglers recording 32 goals and 92 points to lead all team defencemen in scoring. Named to the WHL West First All-Star Team, Murzyn was the second-ranked prospect by the NHL Central Scouting Bureau for the 1985 NHL entry draft, behind Michigan State Spartans winger Craig Simpson. He was selected fifth overall by the Hartford Whalers at the draft on June 15, 1985.

=== Hartford Whalers and Calgary Flames ===
After signing with the Whalers to a multi-year contract in September 1985, he made the Whalers roster for the 1985–86 season. Murzyn recorded three goals and 26 points in his rookie season to be named to the NHL All-Rookie Team. The following season, he tallied nine goals and 28 points, which would remain personal bests for Murzyn throughout his NHL career. A prolific scorer in junior, Murzyn established himself as primarily a stay-at-home defender in the NHL, noted for his strength in dealing with opposing forwards in front of the net and in the corners.

After two and a half seasons in Hartford, he was dealt to his hometown Calgary Flames midway through the 1987–88 season on January 3, 1988, along with Shane Churla for Neil Sheehy, Carey Wilson and the rights to Lane MacDonald. The following season, his first full campaign with the Flames, represented the highlight of his career, as he helped Calgary to a Stanley Cup championship in 1989, defeating the Montreal Canadiens in six games. Murzyn notched a hat trick the following season in a 12–2 win over the Toronto Maple Leafs on February 22, 1990. He finished the campaign with seven goals and 20 points.

=== Vancouver Canucks ===
Murzyn remained with the Flames for two more seasons before being dealt to the Vancouver Canucks at the trade deadline on March 5, 1991, for Ron Stern and Kevan Guy. In Vancouver, Murzyn formed a partnership with the offensive Jyrki Lumme as the team's top defensive pairing. They later became the league's longest-enduring defensive pairing until Murzyn's retirement in 1999. He recorded 14 points in his first full season with the team in 1991–92. The following season in 1992–93, Murzyn was awarded the Babe Pratt Trophy, the team's fan-voted award for best defenceman. He had scored 16 points and tied for second on the team with Dixon Ward in plus-minus with a career-high +34 rating, behind Pavel Bure (Murzyn and Ward's single-season rating was also the second-highest in team history at the time).

During the 1993–94 season, Murzyn was involved in an incident with Chicago Blackhawks defenceman Chris Chelios in which Chelios scratched his eye during a game on February 2, 1994. Chelios received a consequent four-game suspension. He finished the campaign with his highest offensive totals as a Canuck at six goals and 20 points. In the subsequent 1994 playoffs, the Canucks made it to the Stanley Cup Final, where the Canucks were defeated in seven games by the New York Rangers. Murzyn was unable to compete in what would have been his second Stanley Cup Finals, as he was injured twice over the course of the playoffs. Once in the opening round against his former team, the Flames, and a second time against the Dallas Stars, spraining his knee. He was replaced in the lineup by Brian Glynn.

During the last game of the lockout-shortened 1994–95 season, Murzyn suffered a knee injury. He returned to the lineup to play in eight post-season games in 1995, but the remainder of Murzyn's career was hampered by knee problems, eroding his mobility, which was already noted as one of his weaknesses. In the first month of the 1996–97 season, Murzyn was on the receiving end of a slashing incident with Edmonton Oilers forward Louie DeBrusk on October 6, 1996. DeBrusk received a match penalty during the game and was later suspended four games and given a $1,000 fine. Murzyn finished the campaign with eight points in 61 games.

Murzyn spent the majority of the 1997–98 season sidelined after suffering another knee injury on December 27, 1997, in a game against the Dallas Stars. The following season, Murzyn split the campaign between the Canucks and their American Hockey League (AHL) affiliate, the Syracuse Crunch, before finishing his fourteen-year NHL career by announcing his retirement in 1999 at the age of 32.

== Personal life ==
Murzyn was born on December 9, 1966, in Regina, Saskatchewan. He has a wife, Kim Murzyn. After finishing his NHL career in Vancouver, he returned to Calgary, where he has lived in the same neighbourhood as two of his Flames teammates from the 1989 Stanley Cup-winning team – Joel Otto, and Colin Patterson. Jamie Macoun used to live in the neighbourhood, but eventually moved away. In his post-NHL career, Murzyn has worked as a butcher, had invested in a liquor store in Airdrie, Alberta (interests since sold) and has built spec homes in the British Columbia Interior. Murzyn has also been involved with the Calgary Flames alumni.

== Career statistics ==
=== Regular season and playoffs ===
			Regular season					Playoffs
Season	Team	League	GP	G	A	Pts	PIM	GP	G	A	Pts	PIM
1982–83	Calgary Spurs	AJHL	34	7	20	27	78	—	—	—	—	—
1982–83	Calgary Wranglers	WHL	3	1	0	1	18	10	0	3	3	31
1983–84	Calgary Wranglers	WHL	65	11	20	31	135	2	0	0	0	10
1984–85	Calgary Wranglers	WHL	72	32	60	92	233	8	1	11	12	16
1985–86	Hartford Whalers	NHL	78	3	23	26	125	4	0	0	0	10
1986–87	Hartford Whalers	NHL	74	9	19	28	95	6	2	1	3	29
1987–88	Hartford Whalers	NHL	33	1	6	7	45	—	—	—	—	—
1987–88	Calgary Flames	NHL	41	6	5	11	94	5	2	0	2	13
1988–89	Calgary Flames	NHL	63	3	19	22	142	21	0	3	3	20
1989–90	Calgary Flames	NHL	78	7	13	20	140	6	2	2	4	2
1990–91	Calgary Flames	NHL	19	0	2	2	30	—	—	—	—	—
1990–91	Vancouver Canucks	NHL	10	1	0	1	8	6	0	1	1	8
1991–92	Vancouver Canucks	NHL	70	3	11	14	147	1	0	0	0	15
1992–93	Vancouver Canucks	NHL	79	5	11	16	196	12	3	2	5	18
1993–94	Vancouver Canucks	NHL	80	6	14	20	109	7	0	0	0	4
1994–95	Vancouver Canucks	NHL	40	0	8	8	129	8	0	1	1	22
1995–96	Vancouver Canucks	NHL	69	2	10	12	130	6	0	0	0	25
1996–97	Vancouver Canucks	NHL	61	1	7	8	118	—	—	—	—	—
1997–98	Vancouver Canucks	NHL	31	5	2	7	42	—	—	—	—	—
1998–99	Vancouver Canucks	NHL	12	0	2	2	21	—	—	—	—	—
1998–99	Syracuse Crunch	AHL	20	2	4	6	37	—	—	—	—	—
NHL totals			838	52	152	204	1571	82	9	10	19	166

== Awards ==
- Named to the WHL East First All-Star Team in 1985.
- Named to the NHL All-Rookie Team in 1986.
- Won a Stanley Cup with the Calgary Flames in 1989.
- Won the Babe Pratt Trophy (Canucks' best defenceman) in 1993.

Preceded by Sylvain Côté	Hartford Whalers first-round draft pick 1985	Succeeded by Scott Young
