= Håkan Loob =

Swedish ice hockey player

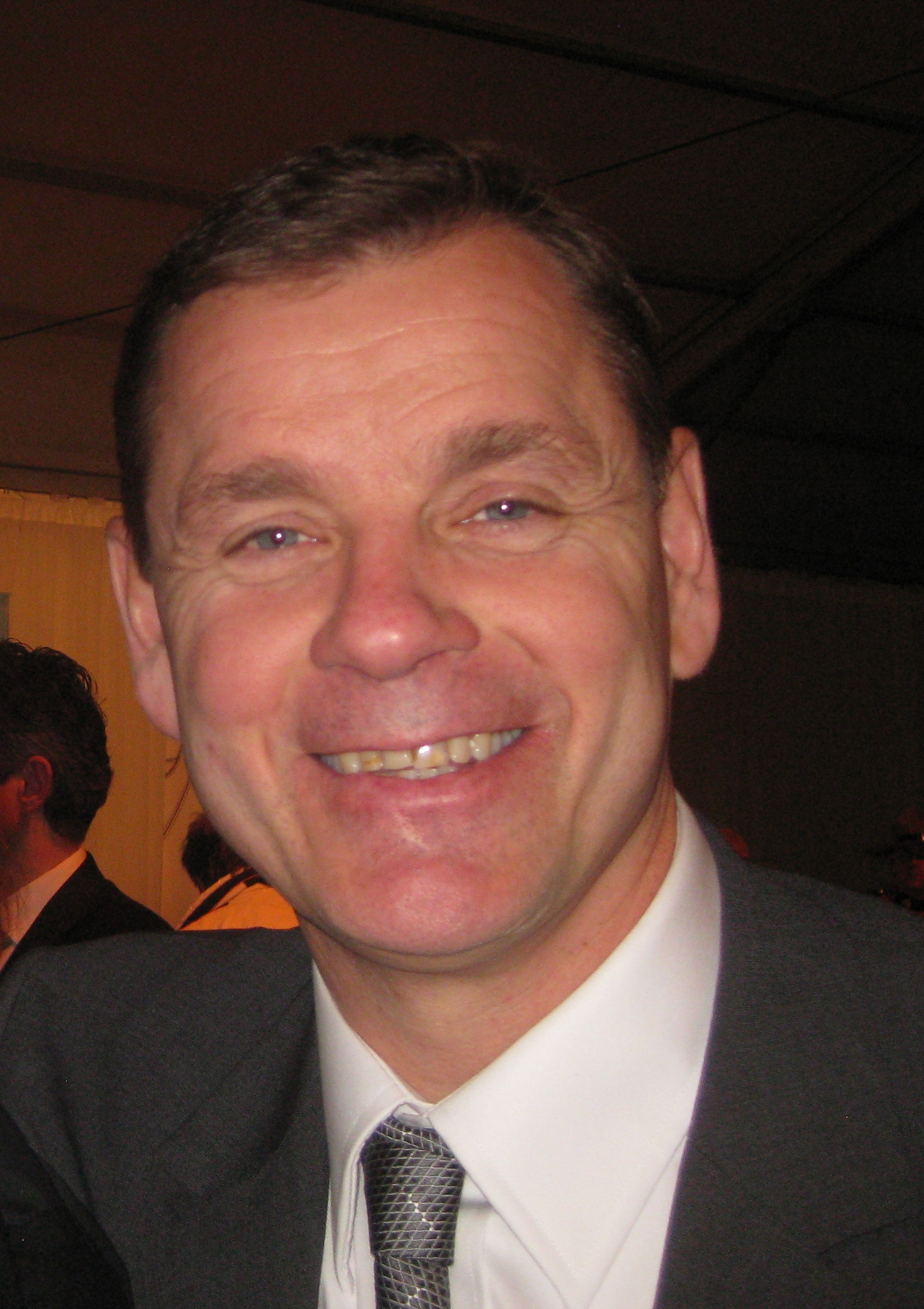
- Loob in 2010
- Born: 3 July 1960 (age 66) Slite, Sweden
- Height: 5 ft 9 in (175 cm)
- Weight: 176 lb (80 kg; 12 st 8 lb)
- Position: Right wing
- Shot: Right
- Played for: Färjestad BK; Calgary Flames
- National team: Sweden
- NHL draft: 181st overall, 1980; Calgary Flames
- Playing career: 1979–1996

Håkan Per Loob (born 3 July 1960) is a Swedish former professional ice hockey player for Färjestad BK of the Elitserien and the Calgary Flames of the National Hockey League (NHL). He is the head of European Scouting for the Calgary Flames after resigning as president of Hockey Operations for Färjestad. Considered one of the greatest Swedish hockey players of all time, he was inducted into the International Ice Hockey Federation Hall of Fame in 1998, and the Swedish ice hockey Hall of Fame in 2012. The Elitserien created the Håkan Loob Trophy, awarded to the league's top goal scorer, in his honour in 2005 and Färjestad has retired his jersey number 5.

Loob joined Färjestad in 1979 and was a member of the team that won the Swedish championship in 1981. He won the Guldpucken as Swedish player of the year in 1982–83 after setting single-season records of 42 goals and 76 points, which remain SHL records. He moved to North America following that season to join the Flames, who had selected him with a ninth-round pick at the 1980 NHL entry draft. Loob was named to the NHL All-Rookie Team in 1983–84 and in 1987–88 was named a first team All-Star after becoming the first Swedish player to score 50 goals in one NHL season. He won the Stanley Cup with Calgary in 1989, after which he chose to return to Sweden.

Rejoining Färjestad in 1989, Loob won consecutive Guldhjälmen awards in 1991 and 1992 as the Elitserien's most valuable player as selected by his fellow players. He retired in 1996 to become the club's general manager. He managed Färjestad to four Elitserien titles in 11 seasons before being elevated to team president. Internationally, Loob represented the Swedish national team on several occasions. He was one of the first three members of the Triple Gold Club, (with Sweden teammates Tomas Jonsson, and Mats Näslund) signifying that he has won the Stanley Cup (in 1989), the World Championship (in 1987 and 1991) and an Olympic gold medal (1994).

== Early life ==
Loob was born on 3 July 1960 on Gotland, where he grew up in the small town of Slite. Loob is of Estonian descent. Loob's grandparents, together with their children, including Loob's father, Paul, fled to Gotland in a small boat across the Baltic sea from the island Kihnu during the German occupation of Estonia in 1944. Loob started playing ice hockey at the age of five, when an artificially frozen rink was constructed near his home. Loob was an active athlete in his youth, involved in tennis, handball, football, and sailing, and was one of Sweden's best table tennis talents, winning the Tommy Sport Cup in 1971 at age eleven. At age 15 Loob made his senior debut for IK Graip, and quit all other sports to focus on hockey.

== Playing career ==
=== Färjestad BK ===
Loob began with third division clubs IK Graip Slite and Roma IF Romakloster in 1975–76 and 1976–77 respectively before spending two seasons with second division club Karlskrona IK. He moved up to the Elitserien when he joined Färjestad BK, with whom he scored 15 goals and 19 points in 36 games in 1979–80. He scored 23 goals the following season as Färjestad won its first Le Mat Trophy as Elitserien champion. In 1982–83, Loob set Elitserien records by scoring 42 goals and 76 points. He continues to hold those records today.

=== Calgary Flames ===
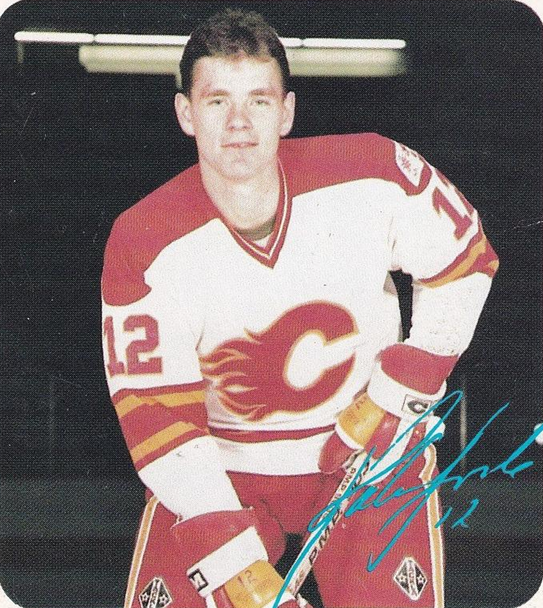
Loob with the Calgary Flames in 1986

The Calgary Flames selected Loob with a ninth-round pick, 181st overall, at the 1980 NHL entry draft. They were not able to convince him to join the club until the 1983–84 NHL season when, after his record setting season in the Elitserien, Flames' General Manager Cliff Fletcher referred to him as the "[Wayne] Gretzky of Sweden". Loob scored 30 goals and 55 points in his first NHL season, and was named to the NHL All-Rookie Team.

Loob improved to 37 goals in 1984–85, which was enough to tie him for the team lead with fellow Swede Kent Nilsson. He led the team outright in 1985–86 with 31 goals, and won the Molson Cup as the Flames player with the most three-star selections. Loob struggled the following year due to a shoulder injury that required surgery to fix at the end of the 1986–87 season. He scored only 18 goals while his 44 points were well below the 67 he had scored the previous season.

"I have to realize my family is a big thing in my life. I could probably play another few years, but I'm just happy with the six years I had in Calgary. Cliff Fletcher treated me as well as anybody ever treated me in my whole life. I think Calgary Flames were pretty happy with what I've done for them and I'm certainly very happy with what they've done for me."

— Loob in 1989, explaining his reasoning for leaving Calgary

Returning to the lineup healthy for 1987–88, Loob became the first Swedish player in NHL history to score 50 goals in one season. He also set a Flames franchise record by scoring five hat tricks during the season. He finished sixth in league goal scoring, while his 106 points was ninth in that category. Loob was named to the First All-Star team on the right wing, and was the winner of the Viking Award as the top Swedish player in the NHL as voted by his fellow Swedes. Loob scored 27 goals in 1988–89, but added 58 assists for the Flames. He added 8 goals and 17 points in the playoffs to help the Flames win their first Stanley Cup in franchise history. In the Cup clinching game against the Montreal Canadiens, Loob started a quick passing play with Joe Nieuwendyk on a three-on-one rush that set up Lanny McDonald's final NHL goal and gave the Flames a lead they would not relinquish.

During the 1989 Stanley Cup playoffs, Loob made it known that he was considering a return to Sweden. He later revealed that he and his wife had made the decision almost a year before and that he declined a large contract offer the team offered to entice him to stay. Loob wanted his children to grow up in Sweden, however, and after the Flames won the Stanley Cup, he announced he was returning to Färjestad for the 1989–90 season.

=== Return to Färjestad ===
In his first season back in Sweden, Loob scored 22 goals in 40 games for Färjestad and led the league with 53 points. He improved to 33 goals in 1990–91 while his 66 points again led the Elitserien. He won the Guldhjälmen ("Golden Helmet") as the most valuable player of the league as voted by the players. He won a second consecutive Guldhjälmen in 1991–92 and led the league in scoring for a third consecutive season. At 37 goals, Loob also led the league in goal scoring. He played another four seasons with Färjestad, retiring in 1996.

Loob ended his playing career as the Elitserien's all-time leading goal scorer with 305 goals combined between the regular season and playoffs. The league created the Håkan Loob Trophy in his honour and awards it to the leading goal scorer. Färjestad retired his jersey number 5 and named him the team's general manager for the 1996–97 season. He served in the role for 11 seasons, during which the team reached the final of the Elitersien playoffs eight times and won four championships. Two of the titles came in his first two seasons as general manager, 1996–97 and 1997–98. He added a third in 2001–02, and the fourth in 2005–06. Loob was promoted to team president in 2008.

In January 2017, it was announced that he would quit as Färjestads BK's director of sport at the end of the 2016–2017 season.

=== International ===
Medal record

Representing Sweden

Men's ice hockey

World Junior Championships
Bronze medal – third place	1979 Sweden	
Bronze medal – third place	1980 Finland	

World Championships
Gold medal – first place	1987 Austria	
Silver medal – second place	1990 Switzerland	
Gold medal – first place	1991 Finland	

Olympic Games
Gold medal – first place	1994 Lillehammer	

Internationally, Loob first skated for the Swedish junior team at the European Junior Hockey Championship in 1978. He then won bronze medals with the Swedish team at both the 1979 and 1980 World Junior Championships. He finished third in tournament scoring in 1980 with nine points (seven goals, two assists) and was named an all-star. He debuted with the senior team in 1982, scoring three goals in eight games for the Swedish team that finished fourth in the World Championship, but won a silver medal in the European Championship, which counted results amongst only participating European nations.

Loob appeared in his first best-on-best world tournament at the 1984 Canada Cup, where his ten points in eight games was second in team scoring, one behind Kent Nilsson. He scored two goals and two assists in the two game final series, which Sweden lost to Canada. A shoulder injury prevented Loob from playing in the 1987 Canada Cup, but he did appear at the 1987 World Championship. He scored nine points in eight games to help Sweden win its first World Championship in 25 years. He made two additional world championship appearances, winning a silver medal at the 1990 tournament and a second gold in 1991. In the concurrently held European championships, Loob and the Swedes won gold in 1990 and silver in 1991.

The 1992 Albertville Games marked Loob's first Winter Olympic appearance. He averaged one point per game in eight games, including four goals, for the fifth place Swedes. He returned two years later for the 1994 Winter Olympic tournament at Lillehammer, Norway. Loob scored nine points in eight games, and Sweden met Canada for the gold medal. The game went into overtime tied at 2–2, and after that failed to decide the contest, the gold medal was decided for the first time in Olympic history by a shootout. The shootout went seven rounds, until Peter Forsberg scored the winning goal for Sweden. By virtue of winning the Olympic gold, Loob joined teammates Mats Näslund and Tomas Jonsson to become the first three members of the Triple Gold Club as winners of a Stanley Cup championship, a World championship and an Olympic championship. Loob was inducted into the International Ice Hockey Federation Hall of Fame in 1998.

== Playing style ==
Standing five-foot, nine inches tall, and weighing 170 pounds, Loob arrived in Calgary facing skepticism about his ability to cope with the rougher style and smaller ice surface of the NHL compared to what he was used to in the Elitserien. Opinion around the NHL in the early 1980s was that Swedish players were "soft"; teammate Colin Patterson credited Loob with changing that perception. He was a vocal leader, unafraid to speak to his teammates when he felt it necessary. He was a strong skater with "dazzling technique", and former Calgary linemate Joe Nieuwendyk said Loob was a key reason for his own early success in the NHL: "He just had such a great amount of skill. He could do things none of the rest of us could. The luckiest thing that happened to me was getting put on Hakan Loob’s line my first full year in Calgary. He helped me so much, starting my career the right way. A big reason why I scored 50." Nieuwendyk added that Loob could "put pucks into areas, make plays, nobody else would dream of".

== Personal life ==
Loob's older brother Peter was also a hockey player. The brothers played together briefly with Färjestad and Peter appeared in eight NHL games with the Quebec Nordiques. Håkan and his wife Marie have three children, Henrik, Niclas, and Isabelle. Their children are why the family chose to return to Sweden in 1989. Loob always intended to return home following his playing days, but felt that Henrik's assimilation into North American culture was problematic. He wanted his family to grow up in Sweden.

== Career statistics ==
=== Regular season and playoffs ===
			Regular season					Playoffs
Season	Team	League	GP	G	A	Pts	PIM	GP	G	A	Pts	PIM
1975–76	IK Graip	SWE.3	22	12	2	14	—	—	—	—	—	—
1976–77	Roma IF	SWE.3	20	19	12	31	—	—	—	—	—	—
1977–78	Karlskrona AIK	SWE.2	25	15	4	19	37	5	3	2	5	0
1978–79	Karlskrona AIK	SWE.2	23	23	9	32	8	—	—	—	—	—
1979–80	Färjestads BK	SEL	36	15	4	19	20	—	—	—	—	—
1980–81	Färjestads BK	SEL	36	23	6	29	14	7	5	3	8	6
1981–82	Färjestads BK	SEL	36	26	15	41	28	2	1	0	1	0
1982–83	Färjestads BK	SEL	36	42	34	76	26	8	10	4	14	6
1983–84	Calgary Flames	NHL	77	30	25	55	22	11	2	3	5	2
1984–85	Calgary Flames	NHL	78	37	35	72	14	4	3	3	6	0
1985–86	Calgary Flames	NHL	68	31	36	67	36	22	4	10	14	6
1986–87	Calgary Flames	NHL	68	18	26	44	26	5	1	2	3	0
1987–88	Calgary Flames	NHL	80	50	56	106	47	9	8	1	9	4
1988–89	Calgary Flames	NHL	79	27	58	85	44	22	8	9	17	4
1989–90	Färjestads BK	SEL	40	22	31	53	24	10	9	5	14	2
1990–91	Färjestads BK	SEL	40	33	25	58	16	8	6	4	10	8
1991–92	Färjestads BK	SEL	40	37	29	66	14	6	2	2	4	2
1992–93	Färjestads BK	SEL	40	25	26	51	28	3	4	1	5	0
1993–94	Färjestads BK	SEL	22	9	11	20	12	—	—	—	—	—
1994–95	Färjestads BK	SEL	39	13	25	38	58	4	2	0	2	2
1995–96	Färjestads BK	SEL	40	17	32	49	62	8	4	4	8	2
SEL totals			405	262	238	501	304	56	43	23	65	28
NHL totals			450	193	236	429	189	73	26	28	54	16

=== International ===
Year	Team	Comp	GP	G	A	Pts	PIM
1978	Sweden	EJC	5	3	1	4	2
1979	Sweden	WJC	6	0	2	2	0
1980	Sweden	WJC	5	7	2	9	2
1982	Sweden	WC	8	3	1	4	6
1984	Sweden	CC	8	6	4	10	2
1987	Sweden	WC	8	5	4	9	4
1990	Sweden	WC	10	4	7	11	10
1991	Sweden	WC	10	2	7	9	6
1992	Sweden	OG	8	4	4	8	0
1994	Sweden	OG	8	4	5	9	2
Junior totals			16	10	5	15	4
Senior totals			60	28	32	60	30

== Awards and honours ==
Award	Year
International
IIHF World U20 Championship Tournament All-Star	1980
International Ice Hockey Federation Hall of Fame	1998
Elitserien/Sweden
Guldpucken; Player of the year	1982–83
Guldhjälmen; Most Valuable Player as voted by the players	1990–91; 1991–92
Swedish World All-Star team	1982–83; 1984–85; 1989–90; 1990–91; 1991–92
National Hockey League
All-Rookie Team	1983–84
First team All-Star	1987–88
Viking Award; Top Swedish player in the NHL	1987–88
Stanley Cup champion	1989
Calgary Flames team awards
Molson Cup; Most three star selections	1985–86

Preceded by Patrik Sundström	Guldpucken; 1983	Succeeded by Per-Erik Eklund
