= Jamie Macoun =

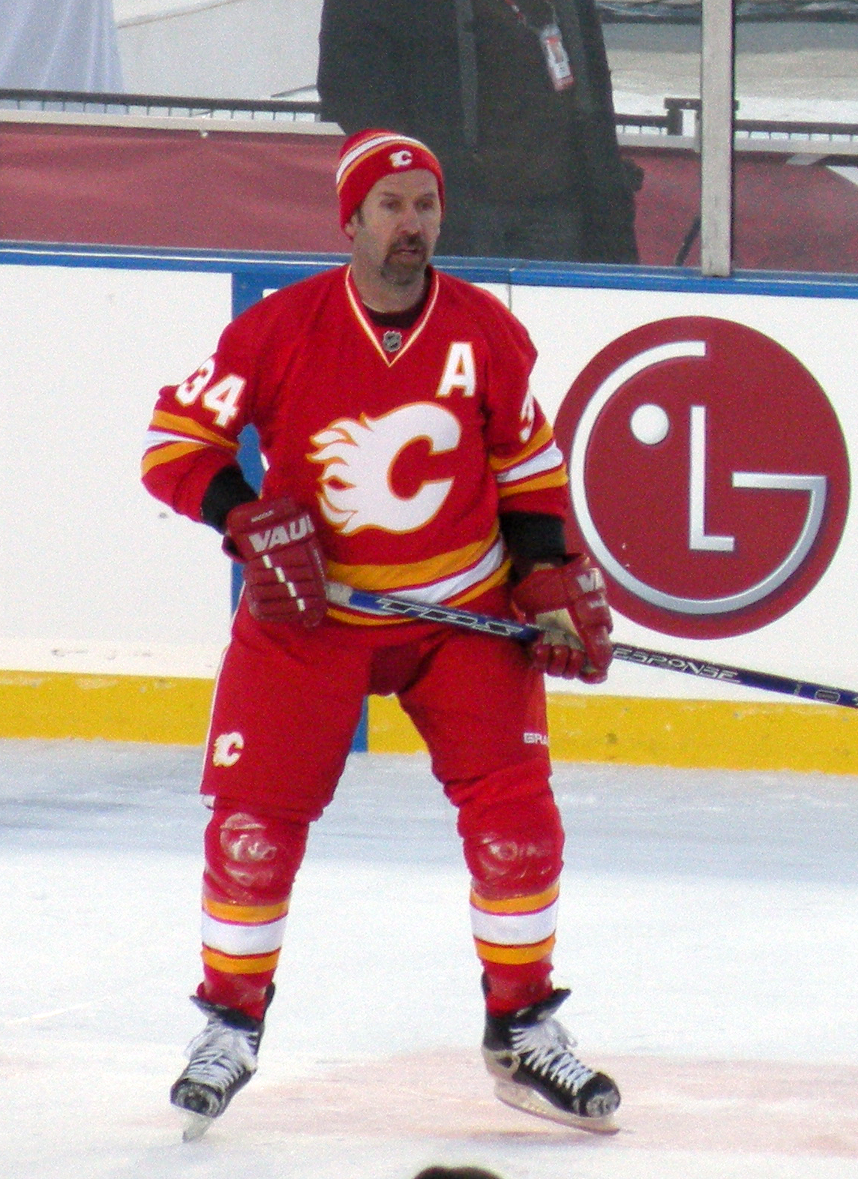
- Macoun in 2011
- Born: August 17, 1961 (age 65) Newmarket, Ontario, Canada
- Height: 6 ft 2 in (188 cm)
- Weight: 201 lb (91 kg; 14 st 5 lb)
- Position: Defence
- Shot: Left
- Played for: Calgary Flames; Toronto Maple Leafs; Detroit Red Wings
- NHL draft: Undrafted
- Playing career: 1983–1999

Jamie Neil Macoun (/məˈkaʊən/ mə-KOW-ən; born August 17, 1961) is a Canadian former professional ice hockey defenceman who played over 1,000 games in the National Hockey League (NHL) during a 17-year career. An undrafted player, Macoun played three seasons of college hockey with Ohio State before signing with the Calgary Flames in 1983. Macoun was named to the NHL All-Rookie Team on defence in 1984 and, after missing 17 months due to injuries suffered in an automobile accident, was a member of Calgary's 1989 Stanley Cup championship team. He was involved in one of the largest trades in NHL history, a ten-player deal that sent him to the Toronto Maple Leafs in 1992. He remained in Toronto until traded to the Detroit Red Wings in 1998, with whom he won his second Stanley Cup.

Internationally, Macoun played with Team Canada at three World Championships. He was a member of the silver medal-winning teams in 1985 and 1991, and was named the best defenceman of the 1991 tournament.

== Playing career ==
Macoun played two seasons of junior hockey in the Ontario Provincial Junior A Hockey League, first with the Newmarket Flyers in 1978–79 then splitting the following season with Newmarket and the Aurora Tigers. He stood only five feet tall at age 16, but added 11 inches in height within two years. Macoun later recounted that the skating ability and speed he became known for was developed as a way to escape players who were much larger than him. He went unselected by any team at the National Hockey League (NHL) Entry Draft and chose to focus instead on his education as he enrolled to study and play college hockey with the Ohio State Buckeyes. He had 17 goals and 76 points in two and a half seasons between 1980 and 1983.

=== Calgary Flames ===
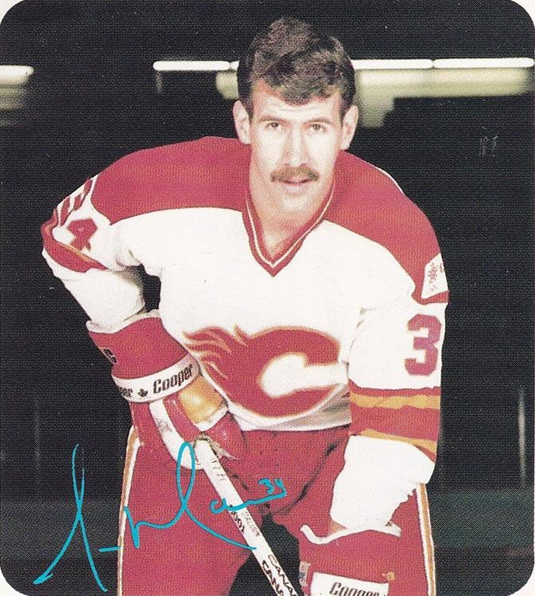
1986 card of Macoun for Calgary Flames

National Hockey League teams had begun to focus attention on Macoun by his junior season and, after he was ruled ineligible to play by the National Collegiate Athletic Association for missing a class, he dropped out of Ohio State to sign a contract with the Calgary Flames in January 1983. Joining the Flames directly from Ohio State, Macoun made his NHL debut on February 10, 1983. He scored his first NHL goal on February 24 in a 4–2 loss to the Washington Capitals. Macoun appeared in 22 games and added four assists to his goal. In his first full season, 1983–84, he scored nine goals, added 30 assists and had a plus-minus rating of +44. The NHL recognized his performance with a place on that season's all-rookie team on defence.

Macoun was involved in several notorious incidents throughout his career; the first two came during the 1984–85 season. During a game against the Edmonton Oilers, Macoun was sucker punched by Mark Messier in retaliation for an earlier hit that Macoun placed on the Oilers' player. Macoun suffered a broken cheekbone, while Messier was suspended 10 games for the incident. The second incident came during the third game of Calgary's first round playoff series against the Winnipeg Jets. In that game, Macoun cross-checked Winnipeg's star player, Dale Hawerchuk, resulting in a broken rib. Hawerchuk missed the remainder of his team's playoff games, but the Jets still won the series. Following Calgary's elimination from the playoffs, Macoun joined Team Canada for the 1985 World Ice Hockey Championships. It was his first appearance with the national team which won a silver medal.

Following a 32-point season in 1985–86, Macoun recorded what was ultimately the highest point total of his career with 40 in 1986–87. During that off-season, Macoun was involved in a serious automobile accident on May 11, 1987. He lost control of his car on a major freeway, crossed three lanes and the centre median before slamming into an oncoming car. His car rolled onto its roof and skidded 200 feet (61 m). The first officer to respond was convinced the crash had been fatal, however Macoun survived, albeit with his arm pinned under his vehicle. It took 45 minutes to extract him from the vehicle. Macoun was charged with impaired driving, but pleaded guilty to a charge of dangerous driving and was fined $1,000.

Doctors believed he would never play hockey again, and that the significant nerve damage Macoun suffered meant he had only a fifty-fifty chance of ever regaining use in his injured arm. He missed the entire 1987–88 NHL season due to the injury, but after 17 months of rehabilitation, Macoun returned to the Flames lineup for the start of the 1988–89 season. He and Ric Nattress formed one of the NHL's top defensive pairings that season; Macoun had eight goals, 19 assists and was a +40. He added nine points in 22 playoff games as the Flames went on to beat the Montreal Canadiens in the final to win the franchise's first Stanley Cup championship.

A 27-point season followed in 1989–90 and Macoun's plus-minus of +34 was second in the NHL amongst defencemen and third overall. He made his second appearance with the national team; Macoun scored a goal and an assist for the fourth placed Canadians at the 1990 World Championship. Macoun appeared in his 500th NHL game on December 7, 1990, against the Quebec Nordiques and finished the 1990–91 NHL season with 22 points in 79 games played. At the 1991 World Championship, Macoun scored four goals during the medal round for Team Canada. The team needed a draw between Sweden and the Soviet Union in the final game of the tournament to win gold, but after the Swedes emerged victorious, Canada settled for the silver medal. Macoun received the Directorate Award as the tournament's top defenceman.

Macoun was involved in a controversial play early in the 1991–92 season. Attempting to defend against Pat LaFontaine of the Buffalo Sabres, Macoun slashed at his opponent, however since LaFontaine was bent over, Macoun's stick hit him in the face. LaFontaine suffered a broken jaw and lost several teeth, however Macoun was not suspended for the incident as the league ruled there had been no intent to injure. The Sabres were outraged by the decision.

=== Toronto and Detroit ===
Midway through the season, Macoun was involved in a blockbuster trade centred on Doug Gilmour that was, at the time, the largest in NHL history. On January 2, 1992, Calgary sent Gilmour, Macoun, Ric Nattress, Rick Wamsley and Kent Manderville to the Toronto Maple Leafs in exchange for Gary Leeman, Craig Berube, Alexander Godynyuk, Michel Petit and Jeff Reese. The ten-player deal was credited as being the catalyst to a significant improvement in Toronto's fortunes on the ice. Though Toronto missed the playoffs in 1991–92, they won more games than they lost in 1992–93 for the first time since 1978–79 and reached the Western Conference Final in both 1993 and 1994.

Macoun scored 19 points in 1992–93 and improved to 30 in 1993–94. He was placed in fewer offensive situations over time, however, as head coach Pat Burns paired Macoun with Dave Ellett and use the two in key defensive situations. They were tasked with stopping their opponents' top players and preventing opposition chances at the end of close games. Offensively, Macoun had only 10 points in the lockout-shortened 1994–95 season and had eight points, all assists, in 82 games in 1995–96. Recognizing his defensive performance, the Maple Leafs signed the 34-year-old Macoun to a two-year contract extension, with an option year, that paid him $1 million per season. The struggles by the Maple Leafs as a team, and by Macoun individually, early in the 1996–97 season led to his name being associated with trade rumours as Toronto contemplated moving one of their older defencemen. He finished the season with Toronto, and remained with the team into 1997–98. On November 8, 1997, Macoun played the 1,000 game of his NHL career, against the Phoenix Coyotes. However, with Toronto situated outside of a playoff spot late in the season, the Maple Leafs traded Macoun to the Detroit Red Wings on March 24, 1998, in exchange for a fourth round selection at the 1998 NHL entry draft. The struggles by the Maple Leafs as a team, and by Macoun individually, early in the 1996–97 season led to his name being associated with trade rumours as Toronto contemplated moving one of their older defencemen. He finished the season with Toronto, and remained with the team into 1997–98. On November 8, 1997, Macoun played the 1,000 game of his NHL career, against the Phoenix Coyotes. However, with Toronto situated outside of a playoff spot late in the season, the Maple Leafs traded Macoun to the Detroit Red Wings on March 24, 1998, in exchange for a fourth round selection at the 1998 NHL entry draft.

Macoun appeared in only seven regular season games with the Red Wings, but recorded two goals and two assists in 22 post-season games in the 1998 Stanley Cup playoffs. He won his second career Stanley Cup after Detroit swept the best-of-seven 1998 Stanley Cup Final and eliminated the Washington Capitals in four games. Following the victory, the Red Wings exercised the contract option and brought Macoun back to Detroit for the 1998–99 season. He appeared in 69 games and recorded one goal and 11 points. However, he appeared in only one playoff game. He retired following the season with 1,128 career games, 76 goals and 282 assists.

== Personal life ==
Macoun and his wife Karin have three children: Colin, Katherine and Jenna. He and Karin briefly operated a stuffed toy selling business while he played for the Calgary Flames. By 1992, he had become a partner in a real estate firm and though he was playing for the Maple Leafs at the time, he returned to the Alberta city in his off-seasons to gain his realtors license. In addition to real estate, Macoun also had an ownership share in a Ford dealership in Ontario. Macoun and his family settled in Calgary following his playing career.

== Career statistics ==
=== Regular season and playoffs ===
			Regular season					Playoffs
Season	Team	League	GP	G	A	Pts	PIM	GP	G	A	Pts	PIM
1978–79	Newmarket Flyers	OPJHL	49	9	14	23	33	—	—	—	—	—
1979–80	Aurora Tigers	OPJHL	13	1	11	12	26	—	—	—	—	—
1979–80	Newmarket Flyers	OPJHL	30	9	19	28	30	—	—	—	—	—
1980–81	Newmarket Flyers	OPJHL	4	0	0	0	5	—	—	—	—	—
1980–81	Ohio State Buckeyes	CCHA	38	9	20	29	83	—	—	—	—	—
1981–82	Ohio State Buckeyes	CCHA	25	2	18	20	89	—	—	—	—	—
1982–83	Ohio State Buckeyes	CCHA	19	6	21	27	54	—	—	—	—	—
1982–83	Calgary Flames	NHL	22	1	4	5	25	9	0	2	2	8
1983–84	Calgary Flames	NHL	72	9	23	32	97	11	1	0	1	0
1984–85	Calgary Flames	NHL	70	9	30	39	67	4	1	0	1	4
1985–86	Calgary Flames	NHL	77	11	21	32	81	22	1	6	7	23
1986–87	Calgary Flames	NHL	79	7	33	40	111	3	1	0	1	8
1988–89	Calgary Flames	NHL	72	8	19	27	76	22	3	6	9	30
1989–90	Calgary Flames	NHL	78	8	27	35	70	6	0	3	3	10
1990–91	Calgary Flames	NHL	79	7	15	22	84	7	0	1	1	4
1991–92	Calgary Flames	NHL	37	2	12	14	53	—	—	—	—	—
1991–92	Toronto Maple Leafs	NHL	39	3	13	16	18	—	—	—	—	—
1992–93	Toronto Maple Leafs	NHL	77	4	15	19	55	21	0	6	6	36
1993–94	Toronto Maple Leafs	NHL	82	3	27	30	115	18	1	1	2	12
1994–95	Toronto Maple Leafs	NHL	46	2	8	10	75	7	1	2	3	8
1995–96	Toronto Maple Leafs	NHL	82	0	8	8	87	6	0	2	2	8
1996–97	Toronto Maple Leafs	NHL	73	1	10	11	93	—	—	—	—	—
1997–98	Toronto Maple Leafs	NHL	67	0	7	7	63	—	—	—	—	—
1997–98	Detroit Red Wings	NHL	7	0	0	0	2	22	2	2	4	18
1998–99	Detroit Red Wings	NHL	69	1	10	11	36	1	0	0	0	0
NHL totals			1,128	76	282	358	1,208	159	10	32	42	169

=== International ===
Medal record

Representing Canada

World Championships
Silver medal – second place	1985 Czechoslovakia	
Silver medal – second place	1991 Finland	

Year	Team	Comp	GP	G	A	Pts	PIM
1985	Canada	WC	9	0	0	0	10
1990	Canada	WC	8	1	1	2	6
1991	Canada	WC	8	4	1	5	10
Senior totals			25	5	2	7	26

== Awards and honours ==
Career
Award	Year	Ref.
NHL All-Rookie Team	1983–84	
Stanley Cup champion	1989, 1998	
Ralph T. Scurfield Humanitarian Award; Calgary: Perseverance, determination and leadership	1990–91	
World Championship best defenceman	1991	
