= Tim Hunter (ice hockey) =

Canadian ice hockey player and coach

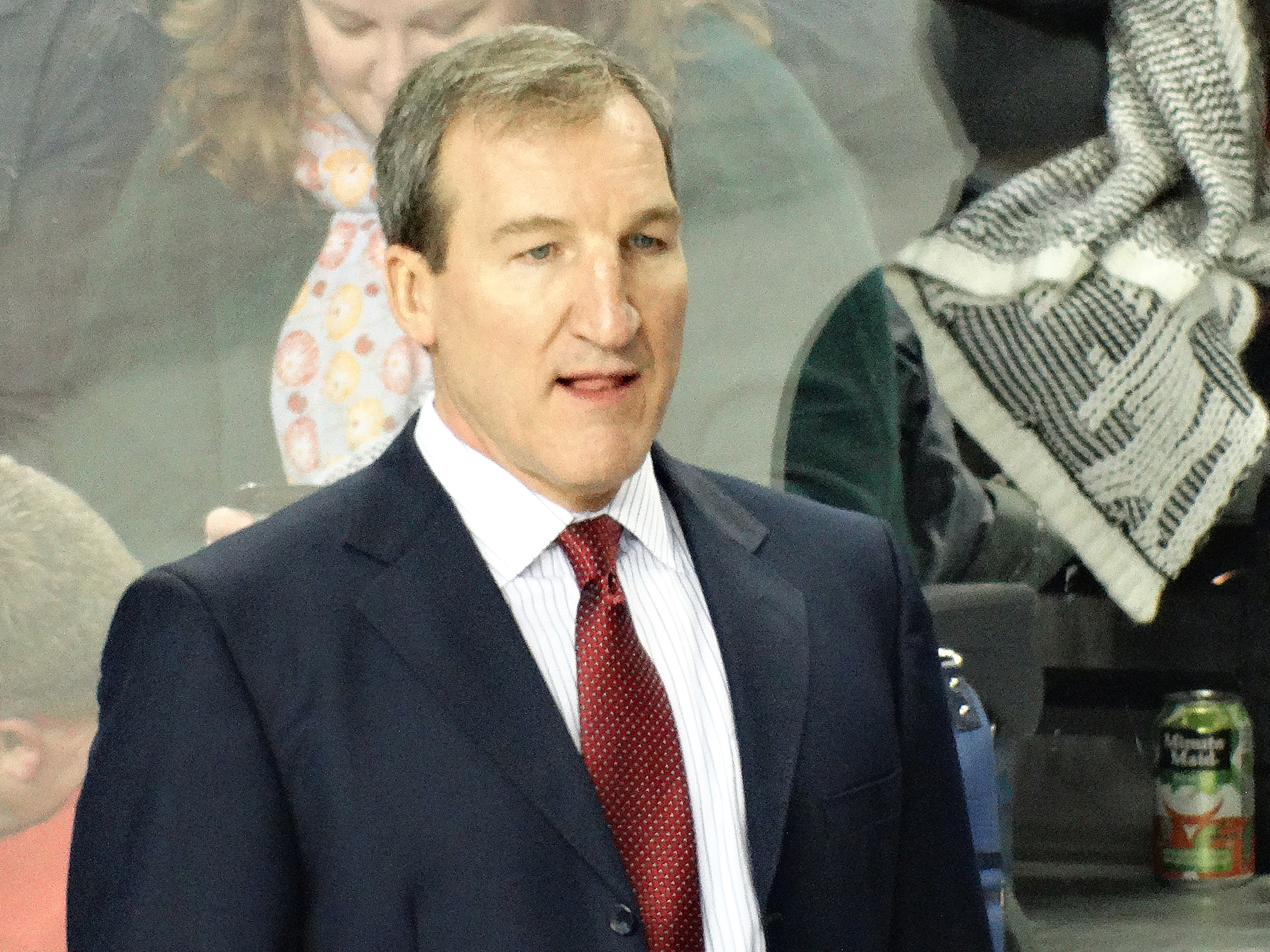
- Hunter at the CHL/NHL Top Prospects Game in 2014
- Born: September 10, 1960 (age 66) Calgary, Alberta, Canada
- Height: 6 ft 2 in (188 cm)
- Weight: 202 lb (92 kg; 14 st 6 lb)
- Position: Right Wing
- Shot: Right
- Played for: Calgary Flames; Quebec Nordiques; Vancouver Canucks; San Jose Sharks
- NHL draft: 54th overall, 1979; Atlanta Flames
- Playing career: 1981–1997

Timothy Robert Hunter (born September 10, 1960) is a Canadian former professional ice hockey player, and most recently the head coach of the Moose Jaw Warriors of the Western Hockey League (WHL), having previously served as an assistant coach in the National Hockey League (NHL), most recently for the Washington Capitals. Chosen in the 3rd round of the 1979 NHL entry draft (#54 overall) by the Atlanta Flames, Hunter went on to a 16-season playing career with the Calgary Flames, Quebec Nordiques, Vancouver Canucks, and San Jose Sharks.

== Playing career ==
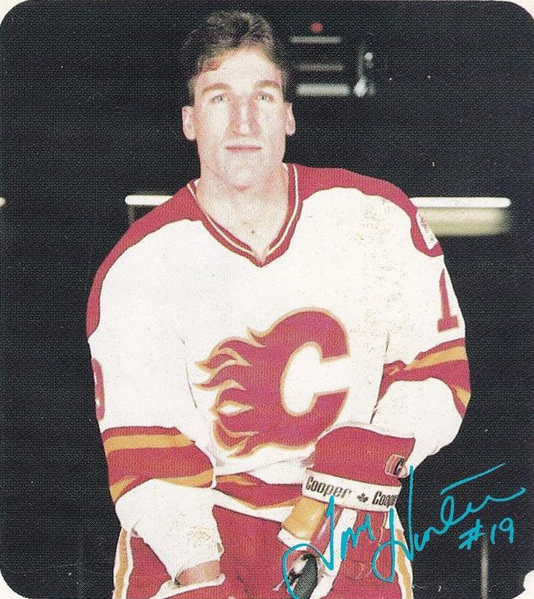
1986 card of Tim Hunter for Calgary Flames

Hunter was on the Flames' 1989 Stanley Cup championship team, and also appeared in the Stanley Cup Final in 1986 with Calgary and in 1994 with Vancouver. During his playing days, Hunter was known for his fierce style of play, ranking him among hockey's unwritten list of elite enforcers during the 1980s and 1990s. He also was a quality defensive player and penalty killer.

== Coaching career ==
Tim Hunter was named as an assistant coach for the Washington Capitals on July 23, 1997, and remained in that position until July 15, 2002. He became an assistant coach with the San Jose Sharks on December 6, 2002, and served through the 2007-08 season. Named as an assistant coach with the Toronto Maple Leafs on July 22, 2008, Hunter was relieved of that position on June 20, 2011. He was re-hired as an assistant coach of the Capitals on July 23, 2012.

Hunter's contract in Washington was not renewed for 2013, and after being linked to several coaching positions in the WHL, he was named as head coach of Moose Jaw Warriors of the Western Hockey League (WHL) in July 2014.

On January 6, 2020 at a team press conference, Tim Hunter was fired from the Moose Jaw Warriors.

== NHL awards and honours ==
- NHL Bud Man of the Year (nominee)
- NHL Bill Masterton Memorial Trophy (2-time nominee)
- NHL King Clancy Memorial Trophy (2-time nominee)
- Calgary Flames Ralph T. Scurfield Humanitarian Award (Winner)
- NHL penalty-minutes leader: 1986-87 (Calgary - 361 PIM), 1988-89 (Calgary - 375 PIM)
- NHL Playoffs penalty-minutes leader: 1983 (Calgary - 70 PIM)
- Calgary Flames team record: Most career penalty minutes (2,405)
- Calgary Flames team record: Most penalty minutes in one season (375 in 1988-89)
- Calgary Flames team record: Most penalty minutes in one playoff year (108 in 1986)

== Career statistics ==
Bold indicates led league

			Regular season					Playoffs
Season	Team	League	GP	G	A	Pts	PIM	GP	G	A	Pts	PIM
1977–78	Kamloops Chiefs	BCHL	51	9	28	37	266	—	—	—	—	—
1977–78	Seattle Breakers	WHL	3	1	2	3	4	—	—	—	—	—
1978–79	Seattle Breakers	WHL	70	8	41	49	300	—	—	—	—	—
1979–80	Seattle Breakers	WHL	72	14	53	67	311	12	1	2	3	41
1980–81	Birmingham Bulls	CHL	58	3	5	8	236	—	—	—	—	—
1980–81	Nova Scotia Voyageurs	AHL	17	0	0	0	62	6	0	1	1	45
1981–82	Calgary Flames	NHL	2	0	0	0	9	—	—	—	—	—
1982–83	Calgary Flames	NHL	16	1	0	1	54	9	1	0	1	70
1982–83	Colorado Flames	CHL	46	5	12	17	225	—	—	—	—	—
1983–84	Calgary Flames	NHL	43	4	4	8	130	7	0	0	0	21
1984–85	Calgary Flames	NHL	71	11	11	22	259	4	0	0	0	24
1985–86	Calgary Flames	NHL	66	8	7	15	291	19	0	3	3	108
1986–87	Calgary Flames	NHL	73	6	15	21	**361**	6	0	0	0	51
1987–88	Calgary Flames	NHL	68	8	5	13	337	9	4	0	4	32
1988–89	Calgary Flames	NHL	75	3	9	12	**375**	19	0	4	4	32
1989–90	Calgary Flames	NHL	67	2	3	5	279	6	0	0	0	4
1990–91	Calgary Flames	NHL	34	5	2	7	143	7	0	0	0	10
1991–92	Calgary Flames	NHL	30	1	3	4	167	—	—	—	—	—
1992–93	Quebec Nordiques	NHL	48	5	3	8	94	—	—	—	—	—
1992–93	Vancouver Canucks	NHL	26	0	4	4	99	11	0	0	0	26
1993–94	Vancouver Canucks	NHL	56	3	4	7	171	24	0	0	0	26
1994–95	Vancouver Canucks	NHL	34	3	2	5	120	11	0	0	0	22
1995–96	Vancouver Canucks	NHL	60	2	0	2	122	—	—	—	—	—
1996–97	San Jose Sharks	NHL	46	0	4	4	135	—	—	—	—	—
NHL totals			815	62	76	138	3,146	132	5	7	12	426

== See also ==
- List of NHL players with 2000 career penalty minutes
