= Bearcat Murray =

Canadian ice hockey trainer (1933–2022)

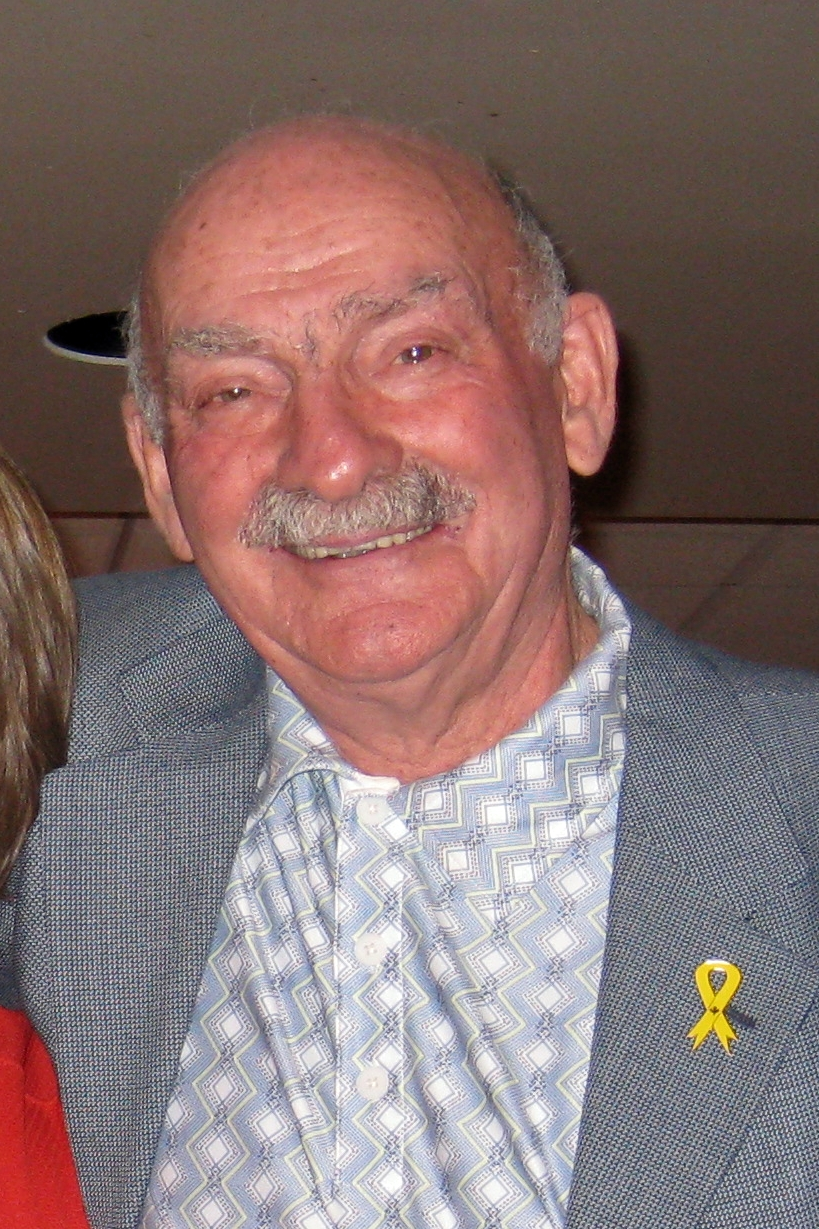
- Murray in 2008
- Born: James Alexander Murray; January 2, 1933; Vulcan, Alberta, Canada
- Died: June 14, 2022 (aged 89); Calgary, Alberta, Canada
- Occupation: Athletic trainer
- Awards: Hockey Hall of Fame (2008)

James Alexander "Bearcat" Murray (January 2, 1933 – June 14, 2022) was the athletic trainer for the Calgary Flames of the National Hockey League, and was inducted into the Hockey Hall of Fame by the Professional Hockey Athletic Trainers Society and the Society of Professional Hockey Equipment Managers.

== Biography ==
Murray was born in Vulcan, Alberta, Canada in 1933, to Allan and Isabelle Murray, and moved to nearby Okotoks in 1937, where he and his family have remained integral members of the community since. The Murray Arena in Okotoks is named in honour of the family's impact on the local sports scene, as Bearcat's father was a senior ice hockey player with the High River Flyers, and his mother a leader with the local curling club. Murray earned the nickname "Bearcat" from his father, who shared the same moniker.

Self-taught, Murray served first as the trainer of the Western Hockey League's Calgary Centennials and Wranglers, and later the World Hockey Association's Calgary Cowboys. He also spent some time as assistant trainer for the Canadian Football League's Calgary Stampeders.

Murray died in Calgary on June 14, 2022.

== Calgary Flames ==
Murray joined the Flames as their head athletic trainer in 1980 when the team arrived after relocating from Atlanta, Georgia, and held the position until his retirement in 1996. He was a part of the Flames' 1989 Stanley Cup championship season.

Murray was famously on the ice, tending to fallen goaltender Mike Vernon while play was still ongoing, as the Flames scored a goal during their 1989 playoff series against the Los Angeles Kings. Vernon explained later that he was not hurt on the play, but went down attempting to draw a penalty after being punched by a Kings player: "I'm lying there wondering when might be a good time to sit up, and all of a sudden there's Bearcat kneeling overtop of me ... We'd just scored a goal with him on the ice and (Wayne) Gretzky was going ballistic. I think Bear thought I'd better be hurt or he might lose his job."

During a game against the Edmonton Oilers in Edmonton, Murray once went up into the stands to rescue his son Al, also a trainer for the Flames, tearing ligaments in his leg in the process. Al had been in the stands attempting to retrieve Gary Suter's stick, which had been knocked into the crowd and was being hidden by Oiler fans. Fearing things were going to escalate, Bearcat jumped into the fray himself. While being wheeled into an ambulance, Murray blew kisses for the cameras. The incident caught the attention of a group of fans in Boston, who formed the "Bearcat Murray Fan Club", and began showing up at the Boston Garden wearing skull caps and oversized moustaches mimicking Murray's looks when the Flames played there. Between 1987 and 1991, a Montreal chapter of the Bearcat Murray Fan Club made regular appearances at the Montreal Forum when the Flames were in town. The group consisted of one Bostonian and a number of native Calgarians who were studying at McGill University and Queen's University. The original members of the 'Bearcat Murray Fan Club – Montreal Chapter' were: John Hutchings, Micheil Innes, Frank MacNeil, Robert Meurin, Jeff Needham, and Charles Robison. Between 1987 and 1991, Bearcat fans would attend Calgary Flames games at the Montreal Forum, wearing skull caps and oversized moustaches. Murray would often meet the group for drinks at Peel Pub or other establishments. 'Bearcat' also generously provided access to tickets as well as the locker room area after games. Although the group disbanded after 1991, they remained in touch and often saw him at Calgary Flames home games, where Murray worked as a community ambassador.

After retiring as the Flames' trainer in 1996, Murray remained with the club as a community ambassador. He was the first person in PHATS history to be unanimously voted into the Hall of Fame.
