= Colin Patterson (ice hockey) =

Canadian ice hockey player (born 1960)

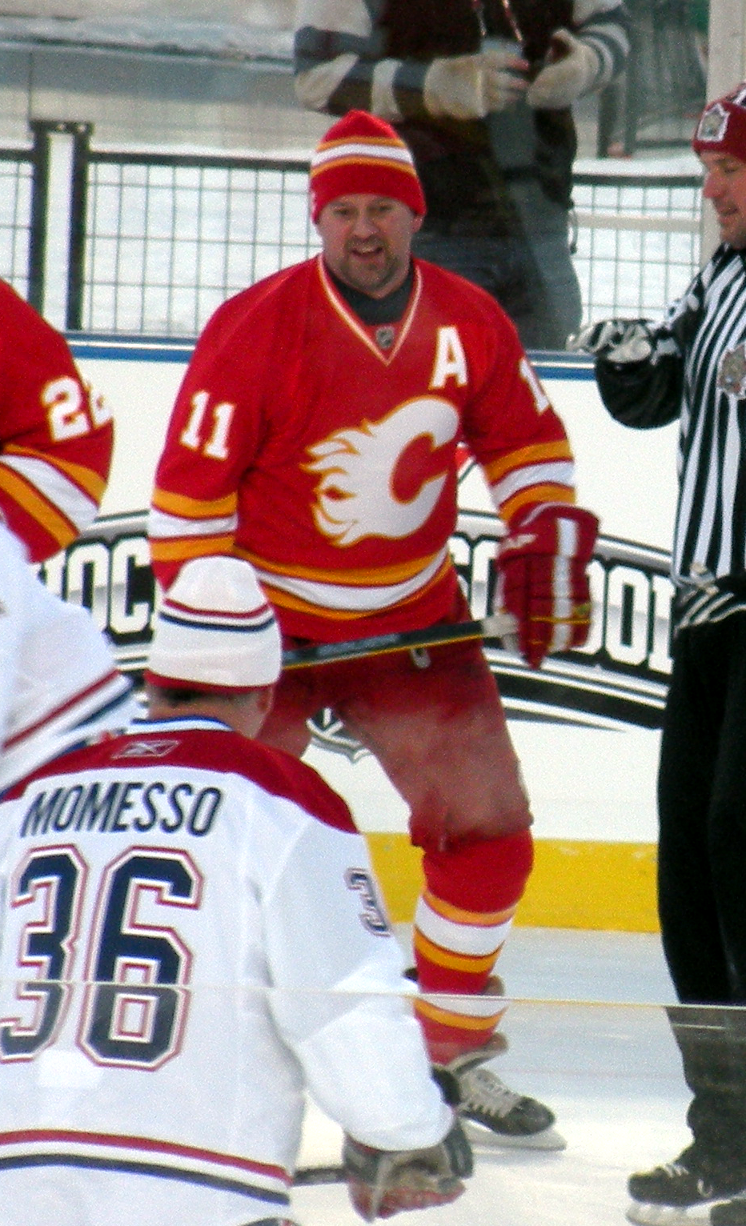
- Patterson at the 2011 Heritage Classic alumni game
- Born: May 11, 1960 (age 65) Rexdale, Ontario, Canada
- Height: 6 ft 2 in (188 cm)
- Weight: 195 lb (88 kg; 13 st 13 lb)
- Position: Winger
- Shot: Right
- Played for: Calgary Flames; Buffalo Sabres
- NHL draft: Undrafted
- Playing career: 1983–1994

Colin Alexander Patterson (born May 11, 1960) is a Canadian former professional ice hockey player who played ten seasons in the National Hockey League (NHL). An undrafted player, he signed as a free agent with the Calgary Flames in 1983 after three seasons of college hockey with the Clarkson Golden Knights. A defensive specialist, Patterson played eight years with the Flames and was a member of their 1989 Stanley Cup championship team. After missing virtually the entire 1990–91 NHL season due to a knee injury, Patterson returned to the NHL for two seasons as a member of the Buffalo Sabres. He retired in 1994 after playing one season in Slovenia for HK Olimpija Ljubljana.

== Playing career ==
=== Minor and college ===
Patterson, a native of Rexdale, Toronto, played minor hockey with the Metro Toronto Hockey League before joining the Royal York Royals of the Ontario Provincial Junior A Hockey League for two seasons. In his second season with the Royals, 1979–80, Patterson recorded 30 goals and 90 points in 41 games. A multi-sport athlete in his youth, Patterson also played lacrosse. He was a member of Canada's bronze medal-winning squad at the 1982 World Lacrosse Championship.

Several American universities expressed interest in Patterson during his junior seasons; he chose to study at Clarkson University and play hockey for the Golden Knights. He played three seasons for Clarkson where he scored 155 points in 99 games. He was named to both the East Coast Athletic Conference second all-star and National Collegiate Athletic Association East first All-American teams in 1982–83. While he was never selected in the NHL entry draft, Patterson was discovered by the Calgary Flames after they had sent a scout to Clarkson observe his teammate Jim Laing. The Flames were impressed with Patterson's play and attempted to sign him to a contract. He was reluctant to leave Clarkson before completing his degree, but was convinced to sign with Calgary following his junior season when the Flames agreed to pay for him to continue his studies during hockey off-seasons.

=== National Hockey League ===
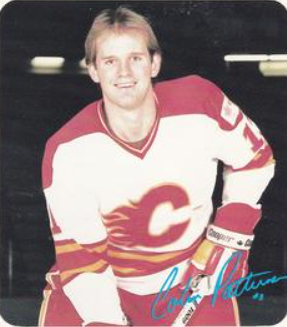
1986 card of Patterson for Calgary Flames

Calgary assigned Patterson to their Central Hockey League (CHL) affiliate, the Colorado Flames to end the 1982–83 season. He appeared in seven regular season games and three more in the CHL playoffs. The Flames felt that Patterson would benefit from playing with the Canadian national team and at the 1984 Winter Olympics, however Team Canada officials felt he didn't fit the team they were building. The Flames assigned him back to Colorado, intending that he would play the entire 1983–84 season in the CHL. He was recalled to Calgary on October 22, 1983, after only six games for what was expected to be a short stint with the NHL team. Instead, he established a place with Doug Risebrough and Richard Kromm as Calgary's top defensive line and never returned to the minors.

Patterson scored his first NHL goal on October 26, 1983, against goaltender Mike Liut of the St. Louis Blues. He finished with 26 points in 56 NHL games in his rookie season, then scored what were ultimately career highs with 22 goals and 43 points in 57 games in 1984–85. Patterson had 21 goals in the first 40 games of the season before missing 23 games in the second half due to knee and shoulder injuries. While he was regarded as a top defensive forward for the Flames, he was frequently forced out of the Flames' lineup due to injury during his career. Patterson missed time in 1986–87 due to concussions, and played in only 39 of Calgary's 80 games in 1987–88.

Patterson's skills as a defensive forward were recognized in the 1988–89 season when he was named a finalist for the Frank J. Selke Trophy. He played in a career-high 74 games, recorded 38 points and his plus-minus of +44 was the third highest in the NHL. Playing on a line with star scorers Doug Gilmour and Joe Mullen, Patterson was regarded as the team's "unsung hero" and played a grinding role to generate opportunities for his teammates. In the 1989 Stanley Cup Playoffs, Patterson appeared in 22 games and recorded a career high 13 points as the Flames defeated the Montreal Canadiens in the 1989 Stanley Cup Final to win the franchise's first Stanley Cup championship.

Injury problems returned in 1989–90 as, after recording only eight points in 61 games, Patterson's season was ended when he broke his ankle on March 24, 1990. His attempted return for the 1990–91 season was halted when he suffered torn knee ligaments during a pre-season game against the Toronto Maple Leafs. The injury caused him to miss the entire regular season, and he returned to appear in only one playoff game. Unsure how Patterson would return after missing the season, the Flames opted to trade him to the Buffalo Sabres prior to the 1991–92 season. Buffalo acquired him in the hopes that his character and success with Calgary would help the Sabres. Patterson played two seasons in Buffalo and recorded 18 points in 88 games. He then opted to play in Europe for his final professional season in 1993–94. With HK Olimpija Ljubljana of the Slovenian Ice Hockey League, Patterson recorded 32 goals and 83 points in just 14 games.

Patterson finished his playing career with 96 goals and 205 points in 504 games. He has been honoured multiple times by Clarkson University, for whom he served as team captain in his junior season: His uniform number 25 was retired by the school, and he was inducted into Clarkson's Athletic Hall of Fame in 2005. Patterson was also inducted into the Etobicoke Sports Hall of Fame in 2008.

== Personal life ==
Patterson completed his degree in Marketing and management from Clarkson, finishing his final year of studies over three hockey off-seasons. He settled in Calgary with his wife Sherrie and three children. He entered the business world following his playing career and has held executive positions at several companies, including the Montreal Trust Company and then as a vice president with Shaw Cablesystems. He has also served as the president of a fire suppression company, and most recently a general manager with an energy services company. Patterson is also active within the Calgary Flames Alumni Association and often participates in the association's charity events.

== Career statistics ==
			Regular season					Playoffs
Season	Team	League	GP	G	A	Pts	PIM	GP	G	A	Pts	PIM
1978–79	Royal York Royals	OPJAHL	40	16	30	46	13	—	—	—	—	—
1979–80	Royal York Royals	OPJAHL	41	30	60	90	44	—	—	—	—	—
1980–81	Clarkson Golden Knights	ECAC	34	20	31	51	8	—	—	—	—	—
1981–82	Clarkson Golden Knights	ECAC	34	21	31	52	32	—	—	—	—	—
1982–83	Clarkson Golden Knights	ECAC	31	23	29	52	30	—	—	—	—	—
1982–83	Colorado Flames	CHL	7	1	1	2	0	3	0	0	0	15
1983–84	Colorado Flames	CHL	6	2	3	5	9	—	—	—	—	—
1983–84	Calgary Flames	NHL	56	13	14	27	15	11	1	1	2	6
1984–85	Calgary Flames	NHL	57	22	21	43	5	4	0	0	0	5
1985–86	Calgary Flames	NHL	61	14	13	27	22	19	6	3	9	10
1986–87	Calgary Flames	NHL	68	13	13	26	41	6	0	2	2	2
1987–88	Calgary Flames	NHL	39	7	11	18	28	9	1	0	1	8
1988–89	Calgary Flames	NHL	74	14	24	38	56	22	3	10	13	24
1989–90	Calgary Flames	NHL	61	5	3	8	20	—	—	—	—	—
1990–91	Calgary Flames	NHL	—	—	—	—	—	1	0	0	0	0
1991–92	Buffalo Sabres	NHL	52	4	8	12	30	5	1	0	1	0
1992–93	Buffalo Sabres	NHL	36	4	2	6	22	8	0	1	1	2
1993–94	HK Olimpija Ljubljana	Slovenia	14	32	51	83	—	6	4	8	12	—
NHL totals			504	96	109	205	239	85	12	17	29	57

== Awards and honours ==
College
Award	Year	Ref.
ECAC Second Team All-Star	1982–83	
AHCA East All-American	1982–83	
