= Ric Nattress =

Canadian ice hockey player

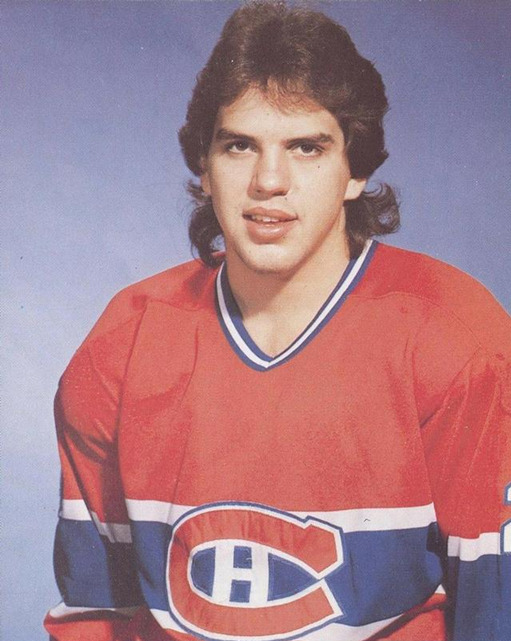
- Nattress in 1982 photo
- Born: May 25, 1962 (age 63) Hamilton, Ontario, Canada
- Height: 6 ft 3 in (191 cm)
- Weight: 210 lb (95 kg; 15 st 0 lb)
- Position: Defence
- Shot: Right
- Played for: Montreal Canadiens; St. Louis Blues; Calgary Flames; Toronto Maple Leafs; Philadelphia Flyers
- National team: Canada
- NHL draft: 27th overall, 1980; Montreal Canadiens
- Playing career: 1982–1993

Eric James Nattress (born May 25, 1962) is a Canadian former National Hockey League defenceman. He was drafted in the second round, 27th overall, by the Montreal Canadiens in the 1980 NHL entry draft.

== Career ==
Nattress played three seasons in the Ontario Hockey League with the Brantford Alexanders before making his NHL debut for Montreal in the 1982–83 season, appearing in 40 games.

On September 23, 1983, the NHL suspended Nattress for the entirety of the 1983–84 season following a conviction for marijuana and hashish possession. The suspension was later reduced to 40 games.

Following his suspension, Nattress would appear in 34 games with the Canadiens in 1983–84, and five more the next season, before being traded to the St. Louis Blues for cash before the 1985–86 season.

Nattress played two seasons for the Blues, who traded him to the Calgary Flames after the 1986–87 season for two draft picks. He played four-plus seasons with the Flames before being traded to the Toronto Maple Leafs in the ten-player deal on January 2, 1992, which also sent Doug Gilmour to Toronto.

After joining the Philadelphia Flyers for the 1992–93 season, Nattress retired. In his NHL career, Nattress played in 536 games. He recorded 29 goals and 135 assists. He also appeared in 67 playoff games, scoring five goals and adding ten assists. He was a member of the Sherbrooke Canadiens 1985 Calder Cup team, and Calgary Flames team which won the Stanley Cup in 1989.

Nattress has been a successful radio co-host of "Blue & White Tonight", a post-game show after every Toronto Maple Leafs game on Sportsnet 590 The Fan.

== Career statistics ==
=== Regular season and playoffs ===
			Regular season					Playoffs
Season	Team	League	GP	G	A	Pts	PIM	GP	G	A	Pts	PIM
1978–79	Hamilton Huskies AAA	Midget	40	21	28	49	76	—	—	—	—	—
1979–80	Brantford Alexanders	OMJHL	65	3	21	24	94	11	1	6	7	38
1980–81	Brantford Alexanders	OHL	51	8	34	42	106	6	1	4	5	19
1981–82	Brantford Alexanders	OHL	59	11	50	61	126	11	3	7	10	17
1981–82	Nova Scotia Voyageurs	AHL	—	—	—	—	—	5	0	1	1	7
1982–83	Montreal Canadiens	NHL	40	1	3	4	19	3	0	0	0	10
1982–83	Nova Scotia Voyageurs	AHL	9	0	4	4	16	2	0	0	0	0
1983–84	Montreal Canadiens	NHL	34	0	12	12	15	—	—	—	—	—
1984–85	Montreal Canadiens	NHL	5	0	1	1	2	2	0	0	0	2
1984–85	Sherbrooke Canadiens	AHL	72	8	40	48	37	16	4	13	17	20
1985–86	St. Louis Blues	NHL	78	4	20	24	52	18	1	4	5	24
1986–87	St. Louis Blues	NHL	73	6	22	28	24	6	0	0	0	2
1987–88	Calgary Flames	NHL	63	2	13	15	37	6	1	3	4	0
1988–89	Calgary Flames	NHL	38	1	8	9	47	19	0	3	3	20
1989–90	Calgary Flames	NHL	49	1	14	15	26	6	2	0	2	8
1990–91	Calgary Flames	NHL	58	5	13	18	63	7	1	0	1	2
1991–92	Calgary Flames	NHL	18	0	5	5	31	—	—	—	—	—
1991–92	Toronto Maple Leafs	NHL	36	2	14	16	32	—	—	—	—	—
1992–93	Philadelphia Flyers	NHL	44	7	10	17	29	—	—	—	—	—
NHL totals			536	29	135	164	377	67	5	10	15	68

=== International ===
Year	Team	Event	GP	G	A	Pts	PIM
1991	Canada	WC	7	0	1	1	4
