= 1988–89 Minnesota North Stars season =

National Hockey League team season

1988–89 Minnesota North Stars
- Division: 3rd Norris
- Conference: 7th Campbell
- 1988–89 record: 27–37–16
- Home record: 17–15–8
- Road record: 10–22–8
- Goals for: 258
- Goals against: 278

Team information
- General manager: Jack Ferreira
- Coach: Pierre Page
- Captain: Craig Hartsburg
- Alternate captains: Basil McRae; Unknown
- Arena: Met Center

Team leaders
- Goals: Dave Gagner (35)
- Assists: Dave Gagner (43)
- Points: Dave Gagner (78)
- Penalty minutes: Basil McRae (365)
- Plus/minus: Dave Gagner (+13)
- Wins: Jon Casey (18)
- Goals against average: Don Beaupre (3.05)

The 1988–89 Minnesota North Stars season, was the team's 22nd season. It saw the North Stars finish in third place in the Norris Division with a record of 27 wins, 37 losses, and 16 ties for 70 points. They lost the Division Semifinals in five games to the St. Louis Blues.

== Offseason ==
=== NHL draft ===
Round	Pick	Player	Nationality	College/junior/club team
1	1	Mike Modano (C)	United States	Prince Albert Raiders (WHL)
2	40	Link Gaetz (D)	Canada	Spokane Chiefs (WHL)
3	43	Shaun Kane (D)	United States	Springfield Olympics (EJHL)
4	64	Jeffrey Stolp (G)	United States	Greenway High School (USHS-MN)
8	148	Ken MacArthur (D)	Canada	University of Denver (WCHA)
9	169	Travis Richards (D)	United States	Robbinsdale Armstrong High School (USHS-MN)
10	190	Ari Matilainen (RW)	Finland	Assat (Finland)
11	211	Grant Bischoff (LW)	United States	University of Minnesota (WCHA)
12	232	Trent Andison (LW)	United States	Cornell University (ECAC)
S	1	Mike McHugh (LW)	United States	University of Maine (Hockey East)
S	6	Dave Schofield (D)	United States	Merrimack College (Hockey East)

== Regular season ==
=== Final standings ===
Norris Division
	GP	W	L	T	GF	GA	Pts
**Detroit Red Wings**	80	34	34	12	313	316	80
**St. Louis Blues**	80	33	35	12	275	285	78
**Minnesota North Stars**	80	27	37	16	258	278	70
**Chicago Blackhawks**	80	27	41	12	297	335	66
Toronto Maple Leafs	80	28	46	6	259	342	62

Note: GP = Games played, W = Wins, L = Losses, T = Ties, Pts = Points, GF = Goals for, GA = Goals against
Note: Teams that qualified for the playoffs are highlighted in bold.

=== Record vs. opponents ===
==== Vs. Campbell Conference ====
**Vs. Norris Division**

1988–89 NHL records
Team	**CHI**	**DET**	**MIN**	**STL**	**TOR**	**Total**
Chicago	—	4–2–2	4–2–2	1–6–1	3–3–2	**12–13–7**
Detroit	2–4–2	—	5–3	3–3–2	5–3	**15–13–4**
Minnesota	2–4–2	3–5	—	2–3–3	3–4–1	**10–16–6**
St. Louis	6–1–1	3–3–2	3–2–3	—	6–2	**18–8–6**
Toronto	3–3–2	3–5	4–3–1	2–6	—	**12–17–3**

**Vs. Smythe Division**

1988–89 NHL records
Team	**CGY**	**EDM**	**LAK**	**VAN**	**WIN**	**Total**
Chicago	0–3	2–0–1	0–3	1–2	3–0	**6–8–1**
Detroit	0–3	2–1	0–3	0–0–3	2–0–1	**4–7–4**
Minnesota	0–2–1	0–1–2	1–2	2–1	2–1	**5–7–3**
St. Louis	0–3	0–3	2–1	0–3	1–1–1	**3–11–1**
Toronto	1–0–2	0–3	0–3	2–1	0–3	**3–10–2**

Vs. Wales Conference

**Vs. Adams Division**

1988–89 NHL records
Team	**BOS**	**BUF**	**HFD**	**MTL**	**QUE**	**Total**
Chicago	0–3	1–2	1–2	0–1–2	2–0–1	**4–8–3**
Detroit	2–0–1	0–3	1–2	2–1	1–2	**6–8–1**
Minnesota	2–0–1	1–0–2	1–2	0–1–2	1–2	**5–5–5**
St. Louis	0–3	2–1	0–1–2	0–2–1	3–0	**5–7–3**
Toronto	0–3	1–2	1–2	1–2	3–0	**6–9–0**

**Vs. Patrick Division**

1988–89 NHL records
Team	**NJD**	**NYI**	**NYR**	**PHI**	**PIT**	**WSH**	**Total**
Chicago	1–2	3–0	0–2–1	0–3	0–3	1–2	**5–12–1**
Detroit	0–2–1	3–0	3–0	2–1	0–2–1	1–1–1	**9–6–3**
Minnesota	1–1–1	1–2	1–2	1–2	2–1	1–1–1	**7–9–2**
St. Louis	1–2	2–1	0–3	3–0	1–1–1	0–2–1	**7–9–2**
Toronto	1–2	2–1	1–1–1	1–2	1–2	1–2	**7–10–1**

== Schedule and results ==
1988–89 regular season
October

Game	Result	Date	Score	Opponent	Record
1	L	October 6, 1988	3–8	St. Louis Blues (1988–89)	0–1–0
2	L	October 8, 1988	3–4	@ Montreal Canadiens (1988–89)	0–2–0
3	L	October 9, 1988	1–4	@ Quebec Nordiques (1988–89)	0–3–0
4	L	October 13, 1988	6–7	Philadelphia Flyers (1988–89)	0–4–0
5	W	October 15, 1988	5–1	Boston Bruins (1988–89)	1–4–0
6	T	October 17, 1988	3–3 OT	@ Edmonton Oilers (1988–89)	1–4–1
7	L	October 19, 1988	1–2	@ Calgary Flames (1988–89)	1–5–1
8	L	October 22, 1988	2–8	@ Los Angeles Kings (1988–89)	1–6–1
9	L	October 26, 1988	2–3	Toronto Maple Leafs (1988–89)	1–7–1
10	L	October 28, 1988	1–4	@ Detroit Red Wings (1988–89)	1–8–1
11	W	October 29, 1988	3–2	Detroit Red Wings (1988–89)	2–8–1

November

Game	Result	Date	Score	Opponent	Record
12	L	November 3, 1988	1–4	@ Chicago Blackhawks (1988–89)	2–9–1
13	T	November 5, 1988	5–5 OT	Chicago Blackhawks (1988–89)	2–9–2
14	L	November 9, 1988	3–6	Detroit Red Wings (1988–89)	2–10–2
15	T	November 10, 1988	5–5 OT	@ St. Louis Blues (1988–89)	2–10–3
16	L	November 12, 1988	1–3	Hartford Whalers (1988–89)	2–11–3
17	W	November 14, 1988	5–4	@ Toronto Maple Leafs (1988–89)	3–11–3
18	L	November 15, 1988	2–4	@ Washington Capitals (1988–89)	3–12–3
19	W	November 17, 1988	7–6	Vancouver Canucks (1988–89)	4–12–3
20	L	November 19, 1988	1–4	New York Rangers (1988–89)	4–13–3
21	T	November 23, 1988	3–3 OT	Edmonton Oilers (1988–89)	4–13–4
22	W	November 25, 1988	5–3	Toronto Maple Leafs (1988–89)	5–13–4
23	W	November 26, 1988	6–3	@ Toronto Maple Leafs (1988–89)	6–13–4
24	W	November 29, 1988	5–2	Chicago Blackhawks (1988–89)	7–13–4

December

Game	Result	Date	Score	Opponent	Record
25	W	December 1, 1988	4–1	@ Boston Bruins (1988–89)	8–13–4
26	W	December 3, 1988	4–2	@ Hartford Whalers (1988–89)	9–13–4
27	L	December 6, 1988	0–3	@ St. Louis Blues (1988–89)	9–14–4
28	T	December 7, 1988	2–2 OT	Montreal Canadiens (1988–89)	9–14–5
29	L	December 10, 1988	1–3	St. Louis Blues (1988–89)	9–15–5
30	L	December 13, 1988	4–5	@ Detroit Red Wings (1988–89)	9–16–5
31	T	December 15, 1988	2–2 OT	Buffalo Sabres (1988–89)	9–16–6
32	W	December 17, 1988	3–2	Los Angeles Kings (1988–89)	10–16–6
33	L	December 19, 1988	1–5	@ Vancouver Canucks (1988–89)	10–17–6
34	L	December 21, 1988	6–8	@ Los Angeles Kings (1988–89)	10–18–6
35	W	December 26, 1988	5–1	Winnipeg Jets (1988–89)	11–18–6
36	L	December 28, 1988	3–4	@ Chicago Blackhawks (1988–89)	11–19–6
37	T	December 30, 1988	5–5 OT	@ St. Louis Blues (1988–89)	11–19–7
38	W	December 31, 1988	6–2	St. Louis Blues (1988–89)	12–19–7

January

Game	Result	Date	Score	Opponent	Record
39	L	January 2, 1989	2–3 OT	Edmonton Oilers (1988–89)	12–20–7
40	W	January 5, 1989	5–3	Philadelphia Flyers (1988–89)	13–20–7
41	L	January 10, 1989	2–3	@ Philadelphia Flyers (1988–89)	13–21–7
42	L	January 12, 1989	2–9	Pittsburgh Penguins (1988–89)	13–22–7
43	T	January 14, 1989	1–1 OT	Calgary Flames (1988–89)	13–22–8
44	W	January 15, 1989	4–1	@ Winnipeg Jets (1988–89)	14–22–8
45	T	January 18, 1989	3–3 OT	@ Buffalo Sabres (1988–89)	14–22–9
46	T	January 19, 1989	3–3 OT	@ Toronto Maple Leafs (1988–89)	14–22–10
47	L	January 21, 1989	6–8	@ New York Islanders (1988–89)	14–23–10
48	W	January 23, 1989	7–2	@ New Jersey Devils (1988–89)	15–23–10
49	W	January 26, 1989	5–3	Quebec Nordiques (1988–89)	16–23–10
50	T	January 28, 1989	4–4 OT	New Jersey Devils (1988–89)	16–23–11
51	T	January 30, 1989	4–4 OT	Washington Capitals (1988–89)	16–23–12

February

Game	Result	Date	Score	Opponent	Record
52	T	February 1, 1989	4–4 OT	Boston Bruins (1988–89)	16–23–13
53	L	February 4, 1989	3–6	@ Quebec Nordiques (1988–89)	16–24–13
54	W	February 5, 1989	5–3	@ New York Rangers (1988–89)	17–24–13
55	W	February 9, 1989	3–2	Vancouver Canucks (1988–89)	18–24–13
56	L	February 11, 1989	1–5	Detroit Red Wings (1988–89)	18–25–13
57	L	February 14, 1989	2–4	Chicago Blackhawks (1988–89)	18–26–13
58	L	February 15, 1989	2–4	@ Detroit Red Wings (1988–89)	18–27–13
59	L	February 18, 1989	3–4	Hartford Whalers (1988–89)	18–28–13
60	W	February 21, 1989	2–1	@ Pittsburgh Penguins (1988–89)	19–28–13
61	T	February 22, 1989	5–5 OT	@ Chicago Blackhawks (1988–89)	19–28–14
62	L	February 25, 1989	2–4	Toronto Maple Leafs (1988–89)	19–29–14
63	W	February 28, 1989	4–3	@ Washington Capitals (1988–89)	20–29–14

March

Game	Result	Date	Score	Opponent	Record
64	L	March 1, 1989	1–5	@ Chicago Blackhawks (1988–89)	20–30–14
65	W	March 4, 1989	4–3	New York Islanders (1988–89)	21–30–14
66	L	March 5, 1989	0–2	@ New Jersey Devils (1988–89)	21–31–14
67	W	March 7, 1989	5–3	Detroit Red Wings (1988–89)	22–31–14
68	T	March 11, 1989	2–2 OT	@ St. Louis Blues (1988–89)	22–31–15
69	W	March 12, 1989	5–3	St. Louis Blues (1988–89)	23–31–15
70	L	March 14, 1989	3–5	Toronto Maple Leafs (1988–89)	23–32–15
71	W	March 16, 1989	6–1	Chicago Blackhawks (1988–89)	24–32–15
72	W	March 18, 1989	3–0	Buffalo Sabres (1988–89)	25–32–15
73	W	March 20, 1989	7–2	Pittsburgh Penguins (1988–89)	26–32–15
74	L	March 22, 1989	1–3	@ New York Rangers (1988–89)	26–33–15
75	L	March 23, 1989	1–3	@ New York Islanders (1988–89)	26–34–15
76	T	March 25, 1989	1–1 OT	@ Montreal Canadiens (1988–89)	26–34–16
77	L	March 27, 1989	2–3	Calgary Flames (1988–89)	26–35–16
78	L	March 29, 1989	1–3	@ Toronto Maple Leafs (1988–89)	26–36–16
79	W	March 31, 1989	5–1	@ Detroit Red Wings (1988–89)	27–36–16

April

Game	Result	Date	Score	Opponent	Record
80	L	April 2, 1989	2–3	@ Winnipeg Jets (1988–89)	27–37–16

Legend: Win (2 points) Loss (0 points) Tie (1 point)

== Playoffs ==
Norris Division semifinals

- Minnesota North Stars vs. St. Louis Blues

Date	Away	Score	Home	Score	Notes
April 5	Minnesota North Stars	3	St. Louis Blues	4	(OT)
April 6	Minnesota North Stars	3	St. Louis Blues	4	(OT)
April 8	St. Louis Blues	5	Minnesota North Stars	3	
April 9	St. Louis Blues	4	Minnesota North Stars	5	
April 11	Minnesota North Stars	1	St. Louis Blues	6	

St. Louis wins the series 4–1

== Player statistics ==
=== Forwards ===
Note: GP = Games played; G = Goals; A = Assists; Pts = Points; PIM = Penalty minutes

Player	GP	G	A	Pts	PIM
Dave Gagner	75	35	43	78	104
Dino Ciccarelli	65	32	27	59	64
Neal Broten	68	18	38	56	57
Marc Habscheid	76	23	31	54	40
Brian Bellows	60	23	27	50	55
Brian MacLellan	60	16	23	39	104
Dave Archibald	72	14	19	33	14
Basil McRae	78	12	19	31	365
Stewart Gavin	73	8	18	26	34
Bob Brooke	57	7	9	16	57
Dusan Pasek	48	4	10	14	30
Mike Gartner	13	7	7	14	2
Don Barber	23	8	5	13	8
Larry DePalma	43	5	7	12	102
Curt Fraser	35	5	5	10	76
Wally Schreiber	25	2	5	7	10
Perry Berezan	16	1	4	5	4
Warren Babe	14	2	3	5	19
Steve Gotaas	12	1	3	4	6
Ken Hodge Jr.	5	1	1	2	0
Terry Ruskowski	3	1	1	2	2
Tom Martin	4	1	1	2	4
Dennis Maruk	6	0	1	1	2
Shane Churla	13	1	0	1	54
Mitch Messier	3	0	1	1	0
Kevin Kaminski	1	0	0	0	0
Richard Zemlak	3	0	0	0	13
Mike McHugh	3	0	0	0	2

=== Defensemen ===
Note: GP = Games played; G = Goals; A = Assists; Pts = Points; PIM = Penalty minutes

Player	GP	G	A	Pts	PIM
Shawn Chambers	72	5	19	24	80
Frank Musil	55	1	19	20	54
Craig Hartsburg	30	4	14	18	47
Bob Rouse	66	4	13	17	124
Curt Giles	76	5	10	15	77
Ville Siren	38	2	10	12	58
Larry Murphy	13	4	6	10	12
Reed Larson	11	0	9	9	18
Moe Mantha Jr.	16	1	6	7	10
Dean Kolstad	25	1	5	6	42
Mark Hardy	15	2	4	6	26
Mark Tinordi	47	2	3	5	107
Link Gaetz	12	0	2	2	53
Gord Dineen	2	0	1	1	2
Mike Berger	1	0	0	0	2
Paul Jerrard	5	0	0	0	4
Rob Zettler	2	0	0	0	0

=== Goaltending ===
Note: GP = Games played; W = Wins; L = Losses; T = Ties; SO = Shutouts; GAA = Goals against average

Player	GP	W	L	T	SO	GAA
Jon Casey	55	18	17	12	1	3.06
Kari Takko	32	8	15	4	0	3.48
Jarmo Myllys	6	1	4	0	0	5.55
Don Beaupre	1	0	1	0	3.05	

== Transactions ==
=== Trades ===
March 4, 1989	To Calgary Flames Brian MacLellan; 4th round pick in 1989	To Minnesota North Stars Perry Berezan; Shane Churla
March 7, 1989	To Washington Capitals Dino Ciccarelli; Bob Rouse	To Minnesota North Stars Mike Gartner; Larry Murphy
