= 1988–89 Chicago Blackhawks season =

National Hockey League team season

1988–89 Chicago Blackhawks
- Division: 4th Norris
- Conference: 8th Campbell
- 1988–89 record: 27–41–12
- Home record: 16–14–10
- Road record: 11–27–2
- Goals for: 297
- Goals against: 335

Team information
- General manager: Bob Pulford
- Coach: Mike Keenan
- Captain: Denis Savard (Oct-Mar); Dirk Graham (Mar-May)
- Alternate captains: Keith Brown; Doug Wilson
- Arena: Chicago Stadium

Team leaders
- Goals: Steve Larmer (43)
- Assists: Denis Savard (59)
- Points: Steve Larmer (87)
- Penalty minutes: Dave Manson (352)
- Wins: Alain Chevrier (13)
- Goals against average: Alain Chevrier (3.51)

The 1988–89 Chicago Blackhawks season saw the Blackhawks finish in fourth place in the Norris Division with a record of 27 wins, 41 losses, and 12 ties for 66 points. Chicago did not clinch a postseason berth until the season's final game, needing an overtime goal by Troy Murray against the Toronto Maple Leafs. The Blackhawks proceeded to defeat the higher seeded divisional rivals, the Detroit Red Wings and the St. Louis Blues before falling in the Campbell Conference Finals to the eventual Stanley Cup champion Calgary Flames.

== Offseason ==
The biggest move the Blackhawks made on the ice in the offseason was drafting Boston native Jeremy Roenick with the number 8 pick. Roenick completed his junior year of high school before the draft, and made his NHL debut later that season scoring 18 points in 20 games. The biggest move the Blackhawks made off the ice was GM Bob Pulford replacing Bob Murdoch as Coach with Mike Keenan. The Keenan years resulting in some of the most exciting hockey in Chicago since the Hull/Mikita years – both on the ice (as the Hawks would reach the Stanley Cup Finals in 1992) and off the ice (as Keenan feuded with virtually every star on the team). Forward Denis Savard is named team captain.

=== NHL draft ===
Round	Pick	Player	Nationality	College/Junior/Club team
1	8	Jeremy Roenick (C)	United States	Thayer Academy (USHS)
3	50	Trevor Dam (RW)	Canada	London Knights (OHL)
4	71	Stefan Elvenes (RW)	Sweden	Rögle BK (Sweden)
5	92	Joe Cleary (D)	United States	Stratford Cullitons (MetJHL)
6	113	Justin Lafayette (C)	Canada	Ferris State University (CCHA)
7	134	Craig Woodcroft (C)	United States	Colgate University (ECAC)
8	155	Jon Pojar (LW)	United States	Roseville High School (USHS-MN)
9	176	Matt Hentges (D)	United States	Edina High School (USHS-MN)
10	197	Daniel Maurice (C)	Canada	Chicoutimi Saguenéens (QMJHL)
11	218	Dirk Tenzer (D)	United States	St. Paul's School (USHS-NH)
12	239	Andreas Lupzig (C)	West Germany	EV Landshut (West Germany)
S	13	Todd Wolf (D)	United States	Colgate University (ECAC)

== Regular season ==
The Blackhawks had several prolongated losing streaks – opening the season by losing seven of the first nine, then losing nine straight from mid-November to mid-December, then finishing the year losing nine of the last 13. The Hawks struggled in shorthanded-situations, allowing the most regular season power play goals in the league, with 122.

Offensively, Steve Larmer led the team with 43 goals and 87 points. Dennis Savard led the team in assists with 59, and was second in overall points with 82. In January 1988, the Blackhawks acquired Dirk Graham from Minnesota for Curt Fraser, in what would be one of the organization's better trades. Doug Wilson and Dave Manson led the defense in scoring with 62 and 54 points respectively.

In goal, the Blackhawks struggled to find the right netminder. Darren Pang started the season but his 4.38 goals against average resulted in only a 10–11–6 record. The Blackhawks acquired Alain Chevrier from Winnipeg in January 1989 and he fared slightly better with a 3.51 goals against average and a 13–11–2 record. The Hawks were hoping that 1987's first round draft choice Jim Waite would be the answer, but he failed to win a game, ending with a 0–7–1 record and a 5.22 goals against average. By year-end, they were forced to rely on an undrafted rookie named Eddie Belfour who only had a 4–12–3 record, but did have a respectable 3.87 goals against average.

In March, with Denis Savard out of the lineup due to injury, coach Mike Keenan named forward Dirk Graham as the new captain. A role Graham would keep, upon Savard's return.

=== Final standings ===
Norris Division
	GP	W	L	T	GF	GA	Pts
**Detroit Red Wings**	80	34	34	12	313	316	80
**St. Louis Blues**	80	33	35	12	275	285	78
**Minnesota North Stars**	80	27	37	16	258	278	70
**Chicago Blackhawks**	80	27	41	12	297	335	66
Toronto Maple Leafs	80	28	46	6	259	342	62

Note: GP = Games played, W = Wins, L = Losses, T = Ties, Pts = Points, GF = Goals for, GA = Goals against
Note: Teams that qualified for the playoffs are highlighted in bold.

=== Record vs. opponents ===
==== Vs. Campbell Conference ====
Vs. Norris Division

1988–89 NHL records
Team	CHI	DET	MIN	STL	TOR	Total
Chicago	—	4–2–2	4–2–2	1–6–1	3–3–2	**12–13–7**
Detroit	2–4–2	—	5–3	3–3–2	5–3	**15–13–4**
Minnesota	2–4–2	3–5	—	2–3–3	3–4–1	**10–16–6**
St. Louis	6–1–1	3–3–2	3–2–3	—	6–2	**18–8–6**
Toronto	3–3–2	3–5	4–3–1	2–6	—	**12–17–3**

Vs. Smythe Division

1988–89 NHL records
Team	CGY	EDM	LAK	VAN	WIN	Total
Chicago	0–3	2–0–1	0–3	1–2	3–0	**6–8–1**
Detroit	0–3	2–1	0–3	0–0–3	2–0–1	**4–7–4**
Minnesota	0–2–1	0–1–2	1–2	2–1	2–1	**5–7–3**
St. Louis	0–3	0–3	2–1	0–3	1–1–1	**3–11–1**
Toronto	1–0–2	0–3	0–3	2–1	0–3	**3–10–2**

Vs. Wales Conference

Vs. Adams Division

1988–89 NHL records
Team	BOS	BUF	HFD	MTL	QUE	Total
Chicago	0–3	1–2	1–2	0–1–2	2–0–1	**4–8–3**
Detroit	2–0–1	0–3	1–2	2–1	1–2	**6–8–1**
Minnesota	2–0–1	1–0–2	1–2	0–1–2	1–2	**5–5–5**
St. Louis	0–3	2–1	0–1–2	0–2–1	3–0	**5–7–3**
Toronto	0–3	1–2	1–2	1–2	3–0	**6–9–0**

Vs. Patrick Division

1988–89 NHL records
Team	NJD	NYI	NYR	PHI	PIT	WSH	Total
Chicago	1–2	3–0	0–2–1	0–3	0–3	1–2	**5–12–1**
Detroit	0–2–1	3–0	3–0	2–1	0–2–1	1–1–1	**9–6–3**
Minnesota	1–1–1	1–2	1–2	1–2	2–1	1–1–1	**7–9–2**
St. Louis	1–2	2–1	0–3	3–0	1–1–1	0–2–1	**7–9–2**
Toronto	1–2	2–1	1–1–1	1–2	1–2	1–2	**7–10–1**

== Schedule and results ==
1988–89 regular season
October

Game	Result	Date	Score	Opponent	Record
1	T	October 6, 1988	2–2 OT	New York Rangers (1988–89)	0–0–1
2	L	October 8, 1988	4–7	@ Toronto Maple Leafs (1988–89)	0–1–1
3	L	October 9, 1988	4–8	Toronto Maple Leafs (1988–89)	0–2–1
4	W	October 12, 1988	10–1	Winnipeg Jets (1988–89)	1–2–1
5	L	October 15, 1988	5–7	@ Hartford Whalers (1988–89)	1–3–1
6	L	October 16, 1988	3–10	Boston Bruins (1988–89)	1–4–1
7	L	October 18, 1988	3–4 OT	@ Detroit Red Wings (1988–89)	1–5–1
8	L	October 20, 1988	0–2	@ St. Louis Blues (1988–89)	1–6–1
9	L	October 22, 1988	4–7	@ Pittsburgh Penguins (1988–89)	1–7–1
10	W	October 25, 1988	7–4	@ Quebec Nordiques (1988–89)	2–7–1
11	L	October 28, 1988	2–5	@ Vancouver Canucks (1988–89)	2–8–1
12	W	October 30, 1988	5–2	@ Edmonton Oilers (1988–89)	3–8–1
13	L	October 31, 1988	3–6	@ Calgary Flames (1988–89)	3–9–1

November

Game	Result	Date	Score	Opponent	Record
14	W	November 3, 1988	4–1	Minnesota North Stars (1988–89)	4–9–1
15	T	November 5, 1988	5–5 OT	@ Minnesota North Stars (1988–89)	4–9–2
16	L	November 6, 1988	3–5	Los Angeles Kings (1988–89)	4–10–2
17	T	November 9, 1988	6–6 OT	Montreal Canadiens (1988–89)	4–10–3
18	W	November 11, 1988	6–5 OT	@ Winnipeg Jets (1988–89)	5–10–3
19	T	November 13, 1988	5–5 OT	Quebec Nordiques (1988–89)	5–10–4
20	W	November 16, 1988	3–2	Buffalo Sabres (1988–89)	6–10–4
21	L	November 19, 1988	3–5	@ Montreal Canadiens (1988–89)	6–11–4
22	L	November 20, 1988	4–7	Vancouver Canucks (1988–89)	6–12–4
23	L	November 23, 1988	3–4	@ Toronto Maple Leafs (1988–89)	6–13–4
24	L	November 25, 1988	4–5 OT	@ Buffalo Sabres (1988–89)	6–14–4
25	L	November 26, 1988	2–8	@ Boston Bruins (1988–89)	6–15–4
26	L	November 29, 1988	2–5	@ Minnesota North Stars (1988–89)	6–16–4

December

Game	Result	Date	Score	Opponent	Record
27	L	December 3, 1988	4–6	@ Los Angeles Kings (1988–89)	6–17–4
28	L	December 6, 1988	6–7	@ Pittsburgh Penguins (1988–89)	6–18–4
29	L	December 10, 1988	4–6	@ Philadelphia Flyers (1988–89)	6–19–4
30	W	December 11, 1988	5–2	St. Louis Blues (1988–89)	7–19–4
31	W	December 14, 1988	4–3	Hartford Whalers (1988–89)	8–19–4
32	L	December 17, 1988	0–4	@ St. Louis Blues (1988–89)	8–20–4
33	L	December 18, 1988	3–5	New Jersey Devils (1988–89)	8–21–4
34	L	December 21, 1988	3–4	Washington Capitals (1988–89)	8–22–4
35	W	December 23, 1988	7–2	Detroit Red Wings (1988–89)	9–22–4
36	L	December 26, 1988	1–4	St. Louis Blues (1988–89)	9–23–4
37	W	December 28, 1988	4–3	Minnesota North Stars (1988–89)	10–23–4
38	L	December 31, 1988	1–4	@ New York Rangers (1988–89)	10–24–4

January

Game	Result	Date	Score	Opponent	Record
39	T	January 1, 1989	3–3 OT	Toronto Maple Leafs (1988–89)	10–24–5
40	L	January 7, 1989	3–6	@ Washington Capitals (1988–89)	10–25–5
41	W	January 8, 1989	3–2	New York Islanders (1988–89)	11–25–5
42	T	January 11, 1989	2–2 OT	Detroit Red Wings (1988–89)	11–25–6
43	L	January 12, 1989	5–6	@ Buffalo Sabres (1988–89)	11–26–6
44	W	January 14, 1989	5–3	@ New York Islanders (1988–89)	12–26–6
45	T	January 16, 1989	2–2 OT	Edmonton Oilers (1988–89)	12–26–7
46	L	January 18, 1989	4–6	New York Rangers (1988–89)	12–27–7
47	W	January 20, 1989	3–2	@ Detroit Red Wings (1988–89)	13–27–7
48	L	January 21, 1989	2–4	@ St. Louis Blues (1988–89)	13–28–7
49	W	January 24, 1989	4–2	@ Vancouver Canucks (1988–89)	14–28–7
50	W	January 25, 1989	6–3	@ Edmonton Oilers (1988–89)	15–28–7
51	L	January 28, 1989	4–5 OT	@ Calgary Flames (1988–89)	15–29–7
52	W	January 30, 1989	7–1	Toronto Maple Leafs (1988–89)	16–29–7

February

Game	Result	Date	Score	Opponent	Record
53	W	February 1, 1989	7–4	Winnipeg Jets (1988–89)	17–29–7
54	W	February 4, 1989	3–1	@ Toronto Maple Leafs (1988–89)	18–29–7
55	L	February 5, 1989	4–5	St. Louis Blues (1988–89)	18–30–7
56	W	February 10, 1989	3–1	New York Islanders (1988–89)	19–30–7
57	L	February 12, 1989	2–6	Los Angeles Kings (1988–89)	19–31–7
58	W	February 14, 1989	4–2	@ Minnesota North Stars (1988–89)	20–31–7
59	W	February 15, 1989	7–4	Washington Capitals (1988–89)	21–31–7
60	W	February 17, 1989	5–3	@ Detroit Red Wings (1988–89)	22–31–7
61	T	February 19, 1989	4–4 OT	Montreal Canadiens (1988–89)	22–31–8
62	T	February 22, 1989	5–5 OT	Minnesota North Stars (1988–89)	22–31–9
63	L	February 25, 1989	0–5	@ Detroit Red Wings (1988–89)	22–32–9
64	T	February 26, 1989	4–4 OT	Detroit Red Wings (1988–89)	22–32–10

March

Game	Result	Date	Score	Opponent	Record
65	W	March 1, 1989	5–1	Minnesota North Stars (1988–89)	23–32–10
66	T	March 4, 1989	3–3 OT	@ Toronto Maple Leafs (1988–89)	23–32–11
67	T	March 5, 1989	3–3 OT	St. Louis Blues (1988–89)	23–32–12
68	L	March 8, 1989	5–7	New Jersey Devils (1988–89)	23–33–12
69	L	March 11, 1989	2–7	@ Philadelphia Flyers (1988–89)	23–34–12
70	L	March 12, 1989	5–6	Pittsburgh Penguins (1988–89)	23–35–12
71	L	March 14, 1989	2–3	@ St. Louis Blues (1988–89)	23–36–12
72	L	March 16, 1989	1–6	@ Minnesota North Stars (1988–89)	23–37–12
73	W	March 18, 1989	3–1	@ New Jersey Devils (1988–89)	24–37–12
74	W	March 19, 1989	5–3	Detroit Red Wings (1988–89)	25–37–12
75	L	March 22, 1989	2–3	Philadelphia Flyers (1988–89)	25–38–12
76	L	March 25, 1989	3–6	@ Boston Bruins (1988–89)	25–39–12
77	L	March 26, 1989	5–7	Calgary Flames (1988–89)	25–40–12
78	W	March 29, 1989	3–1	Quebec Nordiques (1988–89)	26–40–12

April

Game	Result	Date	Score	Opponent	Record
79	L	April 1, 1989	1–6	@ Hartford Whalers (1988–89)	26–41–12
80	W	April 2, 1989	4–3 OT	Toronto Maple Leafs (1988–89)	27–41–12

Legend: Win (2 points) Loss (0 points) Tie (1 point)

== Player stats ==
=== Forwards ===
Note: GP = Games played; G = Goals; A = Assists; Pts = Points; PIM = Penalty minutes

Player	GP	G	A	Pts	PIM
Steve Larmer	80	43	44	87	54
Denis Savard	58	23	59	82	110
Dirk Graham	80	33	45	78	89
Troy Murray	79	21	30	51	113
Wayne Presley	72	21	19	40	100
Steve Thomas	45	21	19	40	69
Adam Creighton	43	15	14	29	92
Rick Vaive	30	12	13	25	60
Mike Hudson	41	7	16	23	20
Jeremy Roenick	20	9	9	18	4
Brian Noonan	45	4	12	16	28
Bob Bassen	49	4	12	16	62
Duane Sutter	75	7	9	16	214
Mike Eagles	47	5	11	16	44
Everett Sanipass	50	6	9	15	164
Dan Vincelette	66	11	4	15	119
David Mackey	23	1	2	3	78
Bill Gardner	6	1	1	2	0
Mike Stapleton	7	0	1	1	7
Jari Torkki	4	1	0	1	0
Bill Watson	3	0	1	1	4
Steve Ludzik	6	1	0	1	8
Mike Rucinski	1	0	0	0	0
Wayne Van Dorp	8	0	0	0	23
Warren Rychel	2	0	0	0	17
Greg Gilbert	4	0	0	0	0

=== Defensemen ===
Note: GP = Games played; G = Goals; A = Assists; Pts = Points; PIM = Penalty minutes

Player	GP	G	A	Pts	PIM
Doug Wilson	66	15	47	62	69
Dave Manson	79	18	36	54	352
Trent Yawney	69	5	19	24	116
Keith Brown	74	2	16	18	84
Steve Konroyd	57	5	7	12	40
Bob Murray	15	2	4	6	27
Gary Nylund	23	3	2	5	63
Bob McGill	68	0	4	4	155
Bruce Cassidy	9	0	2	2	4
Mario Doyon	7	1	1	2	6
Marc Bergevin	11	0	0	0	18
Glen Cochrane	6	0	0	0	13
Kent Paynter	1	0	0	0	2
Jim Playfair	7	0	0	0	28

=== Goaltending ===
Note: GP = Games played; W = Wins; L = Losses; T = Ties; SO = Shutouts; GAA = Goals against average

Player	GP	W	L	T	SO	GAA
Alain Chevrier	27	13	11	2	0	3.51
Darren Pang	35	10	11	6	0	4.38
Ed Belfour	23	4	12	3	0	3.87
Chris Clifford	1	0	0	0	0	0.00
Jimmy Waite	11	0	7	1	0	5.22

== Playoffs ==
Despite their awful 27–41–12 record, the Blackhawks made the playoffs by finishing in fourth place in the weak Norris Division after beating the Maple Leafs on the last day of the regular season. After three straight years of first-round defeats in the playoffs, the Blackhawks raised their level of play considerably by stunning the Detroit Red Wings in six games. Denis Savard's 13 points in the series (4 goals and 9 assists) tied a team record shared by Hull and Mikita.

- Norris Division semi-finals

Detroit Red Wings vs. Chicago Blackhawks

Date	Away	Score	Home	Score	Notes
April 5	Chicago Blackhawks	2	Detroit Red Wings	3	
April 6	Chicago Blackhawks	5	Detroit Red Wings	4	(OT)
April 8	Detroit Red Wings	2	Chicago Blackhawks	4	
April 9	Detroit Red Wings	2	Chicago Blackhawks	3	
April 11	Chicago Blackhawks	4	Detroit Red Wings	6	
April 13	Detroit Red Wings	1	Chicago Blackhawks	7	

Chicago wins best-of-seven series 4 games to 2

- Norris Division Finals

Staying hot in the Norris Division Final, the Hawks beat the St. Louis Blues in five games.

Chicago Blackhawks vs. St. Louis Blues

Date	Away	Score	Home	Score
April 18	Chicago Blackhawks	3	St. Louis Blues	1
April 20	Chicago Blackhawks	4	St. Louis Blues	5
April 22	St. Louis Blues	2	Chicago Blackhawks	5
April 24	St. Louis Blues	2	Chicago Blackhawks	3
April 26	Chicago Blackhawks	4	St. Louis Blues	2

Chicago wins best-of-seven series 4 games to 1

- Campbell Conference Finals

After a great playoff run, the Blackhawks Cup dreams ended up in ashes as they were beaten by the eventual Stanley Cup champions Calgary Flames in five games. Denis Savard and Steve Larmer led the team throughout the playoffs averaging more than a point a game. Dave Manson set a team record that still stands with 84 penalty minutes in the playoffs.

Chicago Blackhawks vs. Calgary Flames

Date	Away	Score	Home	Score	Notes
May 2	Chicago Blackhawks	0	Calgary Flames	3	
May 4	Chicago Blackhawks	4	Calgary Flames	2	
May 6	Calgary Flames	5	Chicago Blackhawks	2	
May 8	Calgary Flames	2	Chicago Blackhawks	1	(OT)
May 10	Chicago Blackhawks	1	Calgary Flames	3	

Calgary wins best-of-seven series 4 games to 1
