= 1988–89 St. Louis Blues season =

National Hockey League team season

1988–89 St. Louis Blues
- Division: 2nd Norris
- Conference: 5th Campbell
- 1988–89 record: 33–35–12
- Home record: 22–11–7
- Road record: 11–24–5
- Goals for: 275
- Goals against: 285

Team information
- General manager: Ron Caron
- Coach: Brian Sutter
- Captain: Bernie Federko
- Alternate captains: Rick Meagher; Unknown
- Arena: St. Louis Arena

Team leaders
- Goals: Brett Hull (41)
- Assists: Bernie Federko (45)
- Points: Brett Hull (84)
- Penalty minutes: Todd Ewen (171)
- Wins: Greg Millen (22)
- Goals against average: Greg Millen (3.38)

The 1988–89 St. Louis Blues season was the St. Louis Blues' 22nd season in the National Hockey League (NHL).

== Offseason ==
Team captain Brian Sutter retires to become the new head coach. Forward Bernie Federko is named team captain.

=== NHL draft ===
Round	Pick	Player	Position	School/Club team
1	9	Rod Brind'Amour	Center	Notre Dame Hounds (SJHL)
2	30	Adrien Plavsic	Defense	University of New Hampshire (Hockey East)
3	51	Rob Fournier	Goaltender	North Bay Centennials (OHL)
4	72	Jaan Luik	Defense	Miami University (CCHA)
5	105	Dave LaCouture	Right wing	Natick High School (USHS-MA)
6	114	Dan Fowler	Defense	University of Maine (Hockey East)
7	135	Matt Hayes	Defense	New Hampton School (USHS-NH)
8	156	John McCoy	Left wing	Edina High School (USHS-MN)
9	177	Tony Twist	Left wing	Saskatoon Blades (WHL)
10	198	Bret Hedican	Defense	North High School (USHS-MN)
11	219	Heath DeBoer	Defense	Spring Lake Park High School (USHS-MN)
12	240	Mike Francis	Goaltender	Harvard University (ECAC)
S	14	Mike McNeill	Left wing	University of Notre Dame (CCHA)

== Regular season ==
The Blues tied the Washington Capitals for most shutouts in the league, with 6.

=== Final standings ===
Norris Division
	GP	W	L	T	GF	GA	Pts
**Detroit Red Wings**	80	34	34	12	313	316	80
**St. Louis Blues**	80	33	35	12	275	285	78
**Minnesota North Stars**	80	27	37	16	258	278	70
**Chicago Blackhawks**	80	27	41	12	297	335	66
Toronto Maple Leafs	80	28	46	6	259	342	62

Note: GP = Games played, W = Wins, L = Losses, T = Ties, Pts = Points, GF = Goals for, GA = Goals against
Note: Teams that qualified for the playoffs are highlighted in bold.

=== Record vs. opponents ===
==== Vs. Campbell Conference ====
**Vs. Norris Division**

1988–89 NHL records
Team	**CHI**	**DET**	**MIN**	**STL**	**TOR**	**Total**
Chicago	—	4–2–2	4–2–2	1–6–1	3–3–2	**12–13–7**
Detroit	2–4–2	—	5–3	3–3–2	5–3	**15–13–4**
Minnesota	2–4–2	3–5	—	2–3–3	3–4–1	**10–16–6**
St. Louis	6–1–1	3–3–2	3–2–3	—	6–2	**18–8–6**
Toronto	3–3–2	3–5	4–3–1	2–6	—	**12–17–3**

**Vs. Smythe Division**

1988–89 NHL records
Team	**CGY**	**EDM**	**LAK**	**VAN**	**WIN**	**Total**
Chicago	0–3	2–0–1	0–3	1–2	3–0	**6–8–1**
Detroit	0–3	2–1	0–3	0–0–3	2–0–1	**4–7–4**
Minnesota	0–2–1	0–1–2	1–2	2–1	2–1	**5–7–3**
St. Louis	0–3	0–3	2–1	0–3	1–1–1	**3–11–1**
Toronto	1–0–2	0–3	0–3	2–1	0–3	**3–10–2**

Vs. Wales Conference

**Vs. Adams Division**

1988–89 NHL records
Team	**BOS**	**BUF**	**HFD**	**MTL**	**QUE**	**Total**
Chicago	0–3	1–2	1–2	0–1–2	2–0–1	**4–8–3**
Detroit	2–0–1	0–3	1–2	2–1	1–2	**6–8–1**
Minnesota	2–0–1	1–0–2	1–2	0–1–2	1–2	**5–5–5**
St. Louis	0–3	2–1	0–1–2	0–2–1	3–0	**5–7–3**
Toronto	0–3	1–2	1–2	1–2	3–0	**6–9–0**

**Vs. Patrick Division**

1988–89 NHL records
Team	**NJD**	**NYI**	**NYR**	**PHI**	**PIT**	**WSH**	**Total**
Chicago	1–2	3–0	0–2–1	0–3	0–3	1–2	**5–12–1**
Detroit	0–2–1	3–0	3–0	2–1	0–2–1	1–1–1	**9–6–3**
Minnesota	1–1–1	1–2	1–2	1–2	2–1	1–1–1	**7–9–2**
St. Louis	1–2	2–1	0–3	3–0	1–1–1	0–2–1	**7–9–2**
Toronto	1–2	2–1	1–1–1	1–2	1–2	1–2	**7–10–1**

== Schedule and results ==
1988–89 regular season
October

Game	Result	Date	Score	Opponent	Record
3	W	October 12, 1988	4–2	@ Toronto Maple Leafs (1988–89)	1–1–1
4	T	October 14, 1988	8–8 OT	@ Detroit Red Wings (1988–89)	2–1–1
5	L	October 15, 1988	2–9	@ Pittsburgh Penguins (1988–89)	2–2–1
6	W	October 20, 1988	2–0	Chicago Blackhawks (1988–89)	3–2–1
7	L	October 22, 1988	2–5	Boston Bruins (1988–89)	3–3–1
8	W	October 27, 1988	4–3	Pittsburgh Penguins (1988–89)	4–3–1
9	W	October 29, 1988	3–2	Toronto Maple Leafs (1988–89)	5–3–1

November

Game	Result	Date	Score	Opponent	Record
10	L	November 2, 1988	4–5	@ Edmonton Oilers (1988–89)	5–4–1
11	L	November 3, 1988	1–6	@ Calgary Flames (1988–89)	5–5–1
12	W	November 5, 1988	5–2	@ Quebec Nordiques (1988–89)	6–5–1
13	T	November 7, 1988	3–3 OT	@ Montreal Canadiens (1988–89)	6–5–2
14	T	November 10, 1988	5–5 OT	Minnesota North Stars (1988–89)	6–5–3
15	W	November 12, 1988	4–3	Quebec Nordiques (1988–89)	7–5–3
16	L	November 15, 1988	2–4	New Jersey Devils (1988–89)	7–6–3
17	W	November 17, 1988	3–1	@ Philadelphia Flyers (1988–89)	8–6–3
18	L	November 19, 1988	2–3	Vancouver Canucks (1988–89)	8–7–3
19	L	November 21, 1988	0–4	@ Toronto Maple Leafs (1988–89)	8–8–3
20	L	November 24, 1988	2–4	Edmonton Oilers (1988–89)	8–9–3
21	T	November 26, 1988	4–4 OT	Winnipeg Jets (1988–89)	8–9–4
22	L	November 29, 1988	3–4	@ Washington Capitals (1988–89)	8–10–4

December

Game	Result	Date	Score	Opponent	Record
23	W	December 1, 1988	8–0	New York Islanders (1988–89)	9–10–4
24	W	December 3, 1988	3–0	Toronto Maple Leafs (1988–89)	10–10–4
25	W	December 6, 1988	3–0	Minnesota North Stars (1988–89)	11–10–4
26	L	December 8, 1988	1–5	Montreal Canadiens (1988–89)	11–11–4
27	W	December 10, 1988	3–1	@ Minnesota North Stars (1988–89)	12–11–4
28	L	December 11, 1988	2–5	@ Chicago Blackhawks (1988–89)	12–12–4
29	L	December 13, 1988	3–4	@ New Jersey Devils (1988–89)	12–13–4
30	T	December 15, 1988	3–3 OT	Hartford Whalers (1988–89)	12–13–5
31	W	December 17, 1988	4–0	Chicago Blackhawks (1988–89)	13–13–5
32	L	December 19, 1988	3–4	@ Toronto Maple Leafs (1988–89)	13–14–5
33	L	December 20, 1988	3–6	@ Detroit Red Wings (1988–89)	13–15–5
34	T	December 22, 1988	4–4 OT	Detroit Red Wings (1988–89)	13–15–6
35	W	December 26, 1988	4–1	@ Chicago Blackhawks (1988–89)	14–15–6
36	L	December 28, 1988	2–6	@ Winnipeg Jets (1988–89)	14–16–6
37	T	December 30, 1988	5–5 OT	Minnesota North Stars (1988–89)	14–16–7
38	L	December 31, 1988	2–6	@ Minnesota North Stars (1988–89)	14–17–7

January

Game	Result	Date	Score	Opponent	Record
39	L	January 2, 1989	7–8	@ Boston Bruins (1988–89)	14–18–7
40	L	January 4, 1989	2–4	@ Detroit Red Wings (1988–89)	14–19–7
41	W	January 7, 1989	7–4	Philadelphia Flyers (1988–89)	15–19–7
42	L	January 12, 1989	4–7	@ Los Angeles Kings (1988–89)	15–20–7
43	L	January 15, 1989	1–2	@ Vancouver Canucks (1988–89)	15–21–7
44	W	January 17, 1989	5–2	Los Angeles Kings (1988–89)	16–21–7
45	L	January 19, 1989	0–5	New York Rangers (1988–89)	16–22–7
46	W	January 21, 1989	4–2	Chicago Blackhawks (1988–89)	17–22–7
47	T	January 25, 1989	3–3 OT	@ Hartford Whalers (1988–89)	17–22–8
48	L	January 26, 1989	2–4	@ Boston Bruins (1988–89)	17–23–8
49	T	January 28, 1989	4–4 OT	Washington Capitals (1988–89)	17–23–9
50	W	January 31, 1989	5–3	Winnipeg Jets (1988–89)	18–23–9

February

Game	Result	Date	Score	Opponent	Record
51	W	February 2, 1989	7–3	Buffalo Sabres (1988–89)	19–23–9
52	T	February 3, 1989	3–3 OT	@ Pittsburgh Penguins (1988–89)	19–23–10
53	W	February 5, 1989	5–4	@ Chicago Blackhawks (1988–89)	20–23–10
54	L	February 9, 1989	3–5	Calgary Flames (1988–89)	20–24–10
55	W	February 11, 1989	5–0	New York Islanders (1988–89)	21–24–10
56	L	February 12, 1989	2–5	@ Buffalo Sabres (1988–89)	21–25–10
57	L	February 14, 1989	3–5	Washington Capitals (1988–89)	21–26–10
58	L	February 16, 1989	3–7	@ New York Islanders (1988–89)	21–27–10
59	L	February 18, 1989	2–4	Montreal Canadiens (1988–89)	21–28–10
60	L	February 21, 1989	0–2	@ Vancouver Canucks (1988–89)	21–29–10
61	L	February 24, 1989	3–4	@ Calgary Flames (1988–89)	21–30–10
62	L	February 25, 1989	3–5	@ Edmonton Oilers (1988–89)	21–31–10
63	W	February 27, 1989	7–5	@ Toronto Maple Leafs (1988–89)	22–31–10

March

Game	Result	Date	Score	Opponent	Record
64	W	March 2, 1989	6–4	Los Angeles Kings (1988–89)	23–31–10
65	L	March 4, 1989	4–5 OT	Detroit Red Wings (1988–89)	23–32–10
66	T	March 5, 1989	3–3 OT	@ Chicago Blackhawks (1988–89)	23–32–11
67	W	March 7, 1989	6–2	New Jersey Devils (1988–89)	24–32–11
68	W	March 9, 1989	4–1	Toronto Maple Leafs (1988–89)	25–32–11
69	T	March 11, 1989	2–2 OT	Minnesota North Stars (1988–89)	25–32–12
70	L	March 12, 1989	3–5	@ Minnesota North Stars (1988–89)	25–33–12
71	W	March 14, 1989	3–2	Chicago Blackhawks (1988–89)	26–33–12
72	W	March 16, 1989	4–3 OT	@ Philadelphia Flyers (1988–89)	27–33–12
73	W	March 18, 1989	3–2	Detroit Red Wings (1988–89)	28–33–12
74	L	March 20, 1989	4–7	@ New York Rangers (1988–89)	28–34–12
75	W	March 22, 1989	2–1	@ Buffalo Sabres (1988–89)	29–34–12
76	L	March 25, 1989	0–4	@ Hartford Whalers (1988–89)	29–35–12
77	W	March 27, 1989	3–2	@ Detroit Red Wings (1988–89)	30–35–12
78	W	March 30, 1989	4–3 OT	Quebec Nordiques (1988–89)	31–35–12

April

Game	Result	Date	Score	Opponent	Record
79	W	April 1, 1989	4–3 OT	Toronto Maple Leafs (1988–89)	32–35–12
80	W	April 2, 1989	4–2	Detroit Red Wings (1988–89)	33–35–12

Legend: Win (2 points) Loss (0 points) Tie (1 point)

== Playoffs ==
The Blues defeated the Minnesota North Stars in the Norris Division semifinals, in five games. They lost to the Chicago Blackhawks in the Norris Division finals, in five games.

== Player statistics ==
=== Forwards ===
Note: GP= Games played; G= Goals; AST= Assists; PTS = Points; PIM = Points

Player	GP	G	AST	PTS	PIM
Brett Hull	78	41	43	84	33
Bernie Federko	66	22	45	67	54
Cliff Ronning	64	24	31	55	18
Peter Zezel	52	17	36	53	27
Greg Paslawski	75	26	26	52	18
Tony Hrkac	70	17	28	45	8
Gino Cavallini	74	20	23	43	79
Tony McKegney	71	25	17	42	58
Rick Meagher	78	15	14	29	53
Sergio Momesso	53	9	17	26	139
Steve Tuttle	53	13	12	25	6
Doug Evans	53	7	12	19	81
Herb Raglan	50	7	10	17	144
Mike Bullard	20	4	12	16	46
Todd Ewen	34	4	5	9	171
Craig Coxe	41	0	7	7	127
Dave Lowry	21	3	3	6	11
Jim Vesey	5	1	1	2	7

=== Defensemen ===
Note: GP= Games played; G= Goals; AST= Assists; PTS = Points; PIM = Points

Player	GP	G	AST	PTS	PIM
Brian Benning	66	8	26	34	102
Gordie Roberts	77	2	24	26	90
Paul Cavallini	65	4	20	24	128
Tom Tilley	70	1	22	23	47
Mike Lalor	36	1	14	15	54
Gaston Gingras	52	3	10	13	6
Dave Richter	66	1	5	6	99
Glen Featherstone	18	0	2	2	22
Robert Dirk	9	0	1	1	11
Tim Bothwell	22	0	0	0	14
Dominic Lavoie	1	0	0	0	0

=== Goaltending ===
Note: GP= Games played; W= Wins; L= Losses; T = Ties; SO = Shutouts; GAA = Goals Against

Player	GP	W	L	T	SO	GAA
Greg Millen	52	22	20	7	6	3.38
Vincent Riendeau	32	11	15	5	0	3.52

== Awards and honors ==
- Dan Kelly (sportscaster), Lester Patrick Trophy (posthumous selection)
