= 1988–89 Detroit Red Wings season =

Sports season

1988–89 Detroit Red Wings
- Norris Division champions
- Division: 1st Norris
- Conference: 4th Campbell
- 1988–89 record: 34–34–12
- Home record: 20–14–6
- Road record: 14–20–6
- Goals for: 313
- Goals against: 316

Team information
- General manager: Jim Devellano
- Coach: Jacques Demers
- Captain: Steve Yzerman
- Alternate captains: Gerard Gallant; Mike O'Connell
- Arena: Joe Louis Arena

Team leaders
- Goals: Steve Yzerman (65)
- Assists: Steve Yzerman (90)
- Points: Steve Yzerman (155)
- Penalty minutes: Gerard Gallant (230)
- Plus/minus: Larry Trader (20)
- Wins: Greg Stefan (21)
- Goals against average: Glen Hanlon (3.56)

The 1988–89 Detroit Red Wings season saw the Red Wings finish in first place in the Norris Division with a record of 34 wins, 34 losses, and 12 ties for 80 points. They were the only team even to have at least a .500 record, but they lost the Division Semi-finals four games to two to the Chicago Blackhawks.

== Offseason ==
=== NHL draft ===
| Round | Pick | Player | Nationality | College/junior/club team |
|---|---|---|---|---|
| 1 | 17 | Kory Kocur (RW) | Canada | Saskatoon Blades (WHL) |
| 2 | 38 | Serge Anglehart (D) | Canada | Drummondville Voltigeurs (QMJHL) |
| 3 | 47 | Guy Dupuis (D) | Canada | Hull Olympiques (QMJHL) |
| 3 | 59 | Petr Hrbek (RW) | Czechoslovakia | Sparta Prague (Czechoslovakia) |
| 4 | 80 | Sheldon Kennedy (RW) | Canada | Swift Current Broncos (WHL) |
| 7 | 143 | Kelly Hurd (RW) | Canada | Michigan Technological University (WCHA) |
| 8 | 164 | Brian McCormack (D) | United States | St. Paul's School (USHS-NH) |
| 9 | 185 | Jody Praznik (D) | Canada | Colorado College (WCHA) |
| 10 | 206 | Glen Goodall (C) | Canada | Seattle Thunderbirds (WHL) |
| 11 | 227 | Darren Colbourne (RW) | Canada | Cornwall Royals (OHL) |
| 12 | 248 | Don Stone (C) | United States | University of Michigan (CCHA) |
| S | 22 | Gary Shuchuk (C) | Canada | University of Wisconsin (WCHA) |

== Regular season ==
- October 6, 1988: In a game against the Detroit Red Wings, Wayne Gretzky made his debut as a member of the Los Angeles Kings. Gretzky scored on his first shot, and contributed 3 assists in an 8–2 victory.

=== Final standings ===
Norris Division
| | GP | W | L | T | GF | GA | Pts |
|---|---|---|---|---|---|---|---|
| **Detroit Red Wings** | 80 | 34 | 34 | 12 | 313 | 316 | 80 |
| **St. Louis Blues** | 80 | 33 | 35 | 12 | 275 | 285 | 78 |
| **Minnesota North Stars** | 80 | 27 | 37 | 16 | 258 | 278 | 70 |
| **Chicago Blackhawks** | 80 | 27 | 41 | 12 | 297 | 335 | 66 |
| Toronto Maple Leafs | 80 | 28 | 46 | 6 | 259 | 342 | 62 |

Note: GP = Games played, W = Wins, L = Losses, T = Ties, Pts = Points, GF = Goals for, GA = Goals against
Note: Teams that qualified for the playoffs are highlighted in bold.

=== Record vs. opponents ===
==== Vs. Campbell Conference ====
**Vs. Norris Division**

1988–89 NHL records
| Team | **CHI** | **DET** | **MIN** | **STL** | **TOR** | **Total** |
|---|---|---|---|---|---|---|
| Chicago | — | 4–2–2 | 4–2–2 | 1–6–1 | 3–3–2 | **12–13–7** |
| Detroit | 2–4–2 | — | 5–3 | 3–3–2 | 5–3 | **15–13–4** |
| Minnesota | 2–4–2 | 3–5 | — | 2–3–3 | 3–4–1 | **10–16–6** |
| St. Louis | 6–1–1 | 3–3–2 | 3–2–3 | — | 6–2 | **18–8–6** |
| Toronto | 3–3–2 | 3–5 | 4–3–1 | 2–6 | — | **12–17–3** |

**Vs. Smythe Division**

1988–89 NHL records
| Team | **CGY** | **EDM** | **LAK** | **VAN** | **WIN** | **Total** |
|---|---|---|---|---|---|---|
| Chicago | 0–3 | 2–0–1 | 0–3 | 1–2 | 3–0 | **6–8–1** |
| Detroit | 0–3 | 2–1 | 0–3 | 0–0–3 | 2–0–1 | **4–7–4** |
| Minnesota | 0–2–1 | 0–1–2 | 1–2 | 2–1 | 2–1 | **5–7–3** |
| St. Louis | 0–3 | 0–3 | 2–1 | 0–3 | 1–1–1 | **3–11–1** |
| Toronto | 1–0–2 | 0–3 | 0–3 | 2–1 | 0–3 | **3–10–2** |

Vs. Wales Conference

**Vs. Adams Division**

1988–89 NHL records
| Team | **BOS** | **BUF** | **HFD** | **MTL** | **QUE** | **Total** |
|---|---|---|---|---|---|---|
| Chicago | 0–3 | 1–2 | 1–2 | 0–1–2 | 2–0–1 | **4–8–3** |
| Detroit | 2–0–1 | 0–3 | 1–2 | 2–1 | 1–2 | **6–8–1** |
| Minnesota | 2–0–1 | 1–0–2 | 1–2 | 0–1–2 | 1–2 | **5–5–5** |
| St. Louis | 0–3 | 2–1 | 0–1–2 | 0–2–1 | 3–0 | **5–7–3** |
| Toronto | 0–3 | 1–2 | 1–2 | 1–2 | 3–0 | **6–9–0** |

**Vs. Patrick Division**

1988–89 NHL records
| Team | **NJD** | **NYI** | **NYR** | **PHI** | **PIT** | **WSH** | **Total** |
|---|---|---|---|---|---|---|---|
| Chicago | 1–2 | 3–0 | 0–2–1 | 0–3 | 0–3 | 1–2 | **5–12–1** |
| Detroit | 0–2–1 | 3–0 | 3–0 | 2–1 | 0–2–1 | 1–1–1 | **9–6–3** |
| Minnesota | 1–1–1 | 1–2 | 1–2 | 1–2 | 2–1 | 1–1–1 | **7–9–2** |
| St. Louis | 1–2 | 2–1 | 0–3 | 3–0 | 1–1–1 | 0–2–1 | **7–9–2** |
| Toronto | 1–2 | 2–1 | 1–1–1 | 1–2 | 1–2 | 1–2 | **7–10–1** |

== Playoffs ==
The Red Wings won their second straight division championship and went against Chicago in the first round in a best of seven series and lost in 6 games, or 2–4.

== Schedule and results ==
1988–89 regular season
October

| Game | Result | Date | Score | Opponent | Record |
|---|---|---|---|---|---|
| 1 | L | October 6, 1988 | 2–8 | @ Los Angeles Kings (1988–89) | 0–1–0 |
| 2 | T | October 8, 1988 | 3–3 OT | @ Vancouver Canucks (1988–89) | 0–1–1 |
| 3 | L | October 10, 1988 | 2–5 | @ Calgary Flames (1988–89) | 0–2–1 |
| 4 | T | October 14, 1988 | 8–8 OT | St. Louis Blues (1988–89) | 0–2–2 |
| 5 | W | October 15, 1988 | 5–3 | @ Toronto Maple Leafs (1988–89) | 1–2–2 |
| 6 | W | October 18, 1988 | 4–3 OT | Chicago Blackhawks (1988–89) | 2–2–2 |
| 7 | L | October 21, 1988 | 2–4 | Toronto Maple Leafs (1988–89) | 2–3–2 |
| 8 | T | October 23, 1988 | 3–3 OT | New Jersey Devils (1988–89) | 2–3–3 |
| 9 | W | October 26, 1988 | 4–2 | Montreal Canadiens (1988–89) | 3–3–3 |
| 10 | W | October 28, 1988 | 4–1 | Minnesota North Stars (1988–89) | 4–3–3 |
| 11 | L | October 29, 1988 | 2–3 | @ Minnesota North Stars (1988–89) | 4–4–3 |

November

| Game | Result | Date | Score | Opponent | Record |
|---|---|---|---|---|---|
| 12 | T | November 1, 1988 | 3–3 OT | Washington Capitals (1988–89) | 4–4–4 |
| 13 | L | November 4, 1988 | 3–4 | Philadelphia Flyers (1988–89) | 4–5–4 |
| 14 | W | November 6, 1988 | 5–2 | Edmonton Oilers (1988–89) | 5–5–4 |
| 15 | W | November 9, 1988 | 6–3 | @ Minnesota North Stars (1988–89) | 6–5–4 |
| 16 | W | November 12, 1988 | 5–4 | @ Philadelphia Flyers (1988–89) | 7–5–4 |
| 17 | W | November 13, 1988 | 5–3 | @ New York Rangers (1988–89) | 8–5–4 |
| 18 | W | November 16, 1988 | 4–3 | @ Hartford Whalers (1988–89) | 9–5–4 |
| 19 | W | November 18, 1988 | 5–2 | Boston Bruins (1988–89) | 10–5–4 |
| 20 | W | November 20, 1988 | 5–4 OT | @ Boston Bruins (1988–89) | 11–5–4 |
| 21 | L | November 23, 1988 | 3–8 | Los Angeles Kings (1988–89) | 11–6–4 |
| 22 | W | November 25, 1988 | 6–3 | Winnipeg Jets (1988–89) | 12–6–4 |
| 23 | L | November 27, 1988 | 3–4 | Washington Capitals (1988–89) | 12–7–4 |
| 24 | W | November 29, 1988 | 5–3 | New York Islanders (1988–89) | 13–7–4 |

December

| Game | Result | Date | Score | Opponent | Record |
|---|---|---|---|---|---|
| 25 | W | December 1, 1988 | 7–3 | Quebec Nordiques (1988–89) | 14–7–4 |
| 26 | L | December 3, 1988 | 4–6 | @ Quebec Nordiques (1988–89) | 14–8–4 |
| 27 | L | December 5, 1988 | 2–7 | @ Montreal Canadiens (1988–89) | 14–9–4 |
| 28 | W | December 9, 1988 | 4–3 | Toronto Maple Leafs (1988–89) | 15–9–4 |
| 29 | W | December 10, 1988 | 8–2 | @ Toronto Maple Leafs (1988–89) | 16–9–4 |
| 30 | W | December 13, 1988 | 5–4 | Minnesota North Stars (1988–89) | 17–9–4 |
| 31 | L | December 16, 1988 | 4–6 | Los Angeles Kings (1988–89) | 17–10–4 |
| 32 | L | December 17, 1988 | 2–3 | @ Pittsburgh Penguins (1988–89) | 17–11–4 |
| 33 | W | December 20, 1988 | 6–3 | St. Louis Blues (1988–89) | 18–11–4 |
| 34 | T | December 22, 1988 | 4–4 OT | @ St. Louis Blues (1988–89) | 18–11–5 |
| 35 | L | December 23, 1988 | 2–7 | @ Chicago Blackhawks (1988–89) | 18–12–5 |
| 36 | L | December 28, 1988 | 1–4 | @ Buffalo Sabres (1988–89) | 18–13–5 |
| 37 | L | December 30, 1988 | 3–4 | @ Hartford Whalers (1988–89) | 18–14–5 |
| 38 | L | December 31, 1988 | 2–3 | Hartford Whalers (1988–89) | 18–15–5 |

January

| Game | Result | Date | Score | Opponent | Record |
|---|---|---|---|---|---|
| 39 | W | January 4, 1989 | 4–2 | St. Louis Blues (1988–89) | 19–15–5 |
| 40 | T | January 6, 1989 | 2–2 OT | Vancouver Canucks (1988–89) | 19–15–6 |
| 41 | L | January 7, 1989 | 2–5 | @ New Jersey Devils (1988–89) | 19–16–6 |
| 42 | W | January 9, 1989 | 3–2 | Montreal Canadiens (1988–89) | 20–16–6 |
| 43 | T | January 11, 1989 | 2–2 OT | @ Chicago Blackhawks (1988–89) | 20–16–7 |
| 44 | T | January 14, 1989 | 5–5 OT | @ Boston Bruins (1988–89) | 20–16–8 |
| 45 | W | January 15, 1989 | 8–4 | @ Philadelphia Flyers (1988–89) | 21–16–8 |
| 46 | L | January 17, 1989 | 1–7 | Calgary Flames (1988–89) | 21–17–8 |
| 47 | L | January 20, 1989 | 2–3 | Chicago Blackhawks (1988–89) | 21–18–8 |
| 48 | W | January 22, 1989 | 4–3 | @ Washington Capitals (1988–89) | 22–18–8 |
| 49 | L | January 25, 1989 | 3–6 | Buffalo Sabres (1988–89) | 22–19–8 |
| 50 | W | January 27, 1989 | 8–1 | Toronto Maple Leafs (1988–89) | 23–19–8 |
| 51 | L | January 28, 1989 | 5–10 | @ Pittsburgh Penguins (1988–89) | 23–20–8 |
| 52 | L | January 30, 1989 | 3–4 | Quebec Nordiques (1988–89) | 23–21–8 |

February

| Game | Result | Date | Score | Opponent | Record |
|---|---|---|---|---|---|
| 53 | L | February 2, 1989 | 2–3 OT | @ Calgary Flames (1988–89) | 23–22–8 |
| 54 | L | February 3, 1989 | 5–8 | @ Edmonton Oilers (1988–89) | 23–23–8 |
| 55 | W | February 5, 1989 | 6–2 | @ Winnipeg Jets (1988–89) | 24–23–8 |
| 56 | L | February 9, 1989 | 3–6 | New Jersey Devils (1988–89) | 24–24–8 |
| 57 | W | February 11, 1989 | 5–1 | @ Minnesota North Stars (1988–89) | 25–24–8 |
| 58 | T | February 13, 1989 | 2–2 OT | Winnipeg Jets (1988–89) | 25–24–9 |
| 59 | W | February 15, 1989 | 4–2 | Minnesota North Stars (1988–89) | 26–24–9 |
| 60 | L | February 17, 1989 | 3–5 | Chicago Blackhawks (1988–89) | 26–25–9 |
| 61 | L | February 19, 1989 | 4–8 | @ Buffalo Sabres (1988–89) | 26–26–9 |
| 62 | W | February 21, 1989 | 6–5 | @ New York Islanders (1988–89) | 27–26–9 |
| 63 | T | February 23, 1989 | 6–6 OT | Pittsburgh Penguins (1988–89) | 27–26–10 |
| 64 | W | February 25, 1989 | 5–0 | Chicago Blackhawks (1988–89) | 28–26–10 |
| 65 | T | February 26, 1989 | 4–4 OT | @ Chicago Blackhawks (1988–89) | 28–26–11 |

March

| Game | Result | Date | Score | Opponent | Record |
|---|---|---|---|---|---|
| 66 | W | March 1, 1989 | 6–5 | New York Islanders (1988–89) | 29–26–11 |
| 67 | W | March 4, 1989 | 5–4 OT | @ St. Louis Blues (1988–89) | 30–26–11 |
| 68 | L | March 7, 1989 | 3–5 | @ Minnesota North Stars (1988–89) | 30–27–11 |
| 69 | W | March 9, 1989 | 3–2 | New York Rangers (1988–89) | 31–27–11 |
| 70 | L | March 11, 1989 | 3–5 | @ Toronto Maple Leafs (1988–89) | 31–28–11 |
| 71 | T | March 14, 1989 | 2–2 OT | @ Vancouver Canucks (1988–89) | 31–28–12 |
| 72 | W | March 15, 1989 | 8–6 | @ Edmonton Oilers (1988–89) | 32–28–12 |
| 73 | L | March 18, 1989 | 2–3 | @ St. Louis Blues (1988–89) | 32–29–12 |
| 74 | L | March 19, 1989 | 3–5 | @ Chicago Blackhawks (1988–89) | 32–30–12 |
| 75 | W | March 24, 1989 | 6–2 | Toronto Maple Leafs (1988–89) | 33–30–12 |
| 76 | L | March 25, 1989 | 5–6 | @ Toronto Maple Leafs (1988–89) | 33–31–12 |
| 77 | L | March 27, 1989 | 2–3 | St. Louis Blues (1988–89) | 33–32–12 |
| 78 | W | March 29, 1989 | 4–3 | New York Rangers (1988–89) | 34–32–12 |
| 79 | L | March 31, 1989 | 1–5 | Minnesota North Stars (1988–89) | 34–33–12 |

April

| Game | Result | Date | Score | Opponent | Record |
|---|---|---|---|---|---|
| 80 | L | April 2, 1989 | 2–4 | @ St. Louis Blues (1988–89) | 34–34–12 |

Legend: Win (2 points) Loss (0 points) Tie (1 point)

== Player statistics ==
=== Skaters ===
Regular Season
| Player | GP | G | A | Pts | +/– | PIM |
|---|---|---|---|---|---|---|
| Steve Yzerman | 80 | 65 | 90 | 155 | 17 | 61 |
| Gerard Gallant | 76 | 39 | 54 | 93 | 7 | 230 |
| Adam Oates | 69 | 16 | 62 | 78 | –1 | 14 |
| Paul MacLean | 76 | 36 | 35 | 71 | 7 | 118 |
| Dave Barr | 73 | 27 | 32 | 59 | 12 | 69 |
| Steve Chiasson | 65 | 12 | 35 | 47 | –6 | 149 |
| Shawn Burr | 79 | 19 | 27 | 46 | 5 | 78 |
| Lee Norwood | 66 | 10 | 32 | 42 | 6 | 100 |
| Petr Klima | 51 | 25 | 16 | 41 | 5 | 44 |
| Richard Zombo | 75 | 1 | 20 | 21 | 22 | 106 |
| Joey Kocur | 60 | 9 | 9 | 18 | –4 | 213 |
| Michael O'Connell | 66 | 1 | 15 | 16 | –8 | 41 |
| Miroslav Frycer‡ | 23 | 7 | 8 | 15 | –4 | 47 |
| James Nill | 71 | 8 | 7 | 15 | –1 | 83 |
| Tim Higgins | 42 | 5 | 9 | 14 | 0 | 62 |
| Jeff Sharples | 46 | 4 | 9 | 13 | 5 | 26 |
| Doug Houda | 57 | 2 | 11 | 13 | 17 | 67 |
| John Chabot | 52 | 2 | 10 | 12 | –18 | 6 |
| Adam Graves | 56 | 7 | 5 | 12 | –5 | 60 |
| Jim Pavese‡ | 39 | 3 | 6 | 9 | –1 | 130 |
| Joe Murphy | 26 | 1 | 7 | 8 | –7 | 28 |
| Bob Probert | 25 | 4 | 2 | 6 | –11 | 106 |
| Dale Krentz | 16 | 3 | 3 | 6 | –3 | 4 |
| Kris King | 55 | 2 | 3 | 5 | –7 | 168 |
| Torrie Robertson† | 12 | 2 | 2 | 4 | 0 | 63 |
| Gilbert Delorme | 42 | 1 | 3 | 4 | –11 | 51 |
| Brent Fedyk | 5 | 2 | 0 | 2 | –1 | 0 |
| Douglas Halward‡ | 18 | 0 | 1 | 1 | –11 | 36 |
| John Mokosak | 8 | 0 | 1 | 1 | 0 | 14 |
| John Blum | 6 | 0 | 0 | 0 | –2 | 8 |
| Scott King | 0 | 0 | 0 | 0 | 0 | 0 |
| Jeff Brubaker | 1 | 0 | 0 | 0 | 0 | 0 |
| Miroslav Ihnacak | 1 | 0 | 0 | 0 | 0 | 0 |
| Randall McKay | 3 | 0 | 0 | 0 | –1 | 0 |

Playoffs
| Player | GP | G | A | Pts | +/– | PIM |
|---|---|---|---|---|---|---|
| Steve Yzerman | 6 | 5 | 5 | 10 | –7 | 2 |
| Adam Oates | 6 | 0 | 8 | 8 | –1 | 2 |
| Petr Klima | 6 | 2 | 4 | 6 | 0 | 19 |
| Dave Barr | 6 | 3 | 1 | 4 | 1 | 6 |
| Lee Norwood | 6 | 1 | 2 | 3 | 2 | 16 |
| Steve Chiasson | 5 | 2 | 1 | 3 | –3 | 6 |
| Shawn Burr | 6 | 1 | 2 | 3 | 2 | 6 |
| Gerard Gallant | 6 | 1 | 2 | 3 | –2 | 40 |
| Paul MacLean | 5 | 1 | 1 | 2 | –2 | 8 |
| John Chabot | 6 | 1 | 1 | 2 | 0 | 0 |
| Doug Houda | 6 | 0 | 1 | 1 | –1 | 0 |
| Joey Kocur | 3 | 0 | 1 | 1 | 0 | 6 |
| Gilbert Delorme | 6 | 0 | 1 | 1 | 3 | 2 |
| Torrie Robertson | 6 | 1 | 0 | 1 | –1 | 17 |
| Richard Zombo | 6 | 0 | 1 | 1 | –3 | 16 |
| Randall McKay | 2 | 0 | 0 | 0 | –2 | 2 |
| Tim Higgins | 1 | 0 | 0 | 0 | 0 | 0 |
| Michael O'Connell | 6 | 0 | 0 | 0 | 0 | 4 |
| James Nill | 6 | 0 | 0 | 0 | –1 | 25 |
| Kris King | 2 | 0 | 0 | 0 | 0 | 2 |
| Adam Graves | 5 | 0 | 0 | 0 | –1 | 4 |
| Jeff Sharples | 1 | 0 | 0 | 0 | 0 | 0 |

=== Goaltending ===
Regular Season
| Player | GP | TOI | W | L | T | GA | GAA | SA | SV% | SO |
|---|---|---|---|---|---|---|---|---|---|---|
| Greg Stefan | 46 | 2499 | 21 | 17 | 3 | 167 | 4.01 | 1290 | 0.871 | 0 |
| Glen Hanlon | 39 | 2092 | 13 | 14 | 8 | 124 | 3.56 | 1055 | 0.882 | 1 |
| Sam St. Laurent | 4 | 141 | 0 | 1 | 1 | 9 | 3.83 | 91 | 0.901 | 0 |
| Tim Cheveldae | 2 | 122 | 0 | 2 | 0 | 9 | 4.43 | 74 | 0.878 | 0 |

Playoffs
| Player | GP | TOI | W | L | GA | GAA | SA | SV% | SO |
|---|---|---|---|---|---|---|---|---|---|
| Greg Stefan | 5 | 294 | 2 | 3 | 18 | 3.67 | 151 | 0.881 | 0 |
| Glen Hanlon | 2 | 78 | 0 | 1 | 7 | 5.38 | 47 | 0.851 | 0 |

^{†}Denotes player spent time with another team before joining the Red Wings. Stats reflect time with the Red Wings only.
^{‡}Traded mid-season
Bold/italics denotes franchise record

== Awards and records ==
- Steve Yzerman, Club Record, Most Points in One Season (155)
- Steve Yzerman, Lester B. Pearson Award
- Gerard Gallant, Left Wing, NHL Second All-Star Team
