= 1988–89 New York Islanders season =

NHL hockey team season

1988–89 New York Islanders
- Division: 6th Patrick
- Conference: 10th Wales
- 1988–89 record: 28–47–5
- Home record: 19–18–3
- Road record: 9–29–2
- Goals for: 265
- Goals against: 325

Team information
- General manager: Bill Torrey
- Coach: Terry Simpson and Al Arbour
- Captain: Brent Sutter
- Arena: Nassau Coliseum

Team leaders
- Goals: Pat LaFontaine (45)
- Assists: Pat LaFontaine (43)
- Points: Pat LaFontaine (88)
- Penalty minutes: Rich Pilon (242)
- Wins: Kelly Hrudey (18)
- Goals against average: Jeff Hackett (3.53)

The 1988–89 New York Islanders season was the 17th season for the franchise in the National Hockey League (NHL). It saw the Islanders finish in last place in the Patrick Division with a record of 28 wins, 47 losses, and 5 ties for 61 points, failing to make the playoffs for the first time since 1974.

== Regular season ==
The Islanders failed to qualify for the Stanley Cup playoffs for the first time since the 1973–74 season. This broke a streak of 14 consecutive playoff appearances for the team, which included four straight Stanley Cup championships from 1980 to 1983.

=== Final standings ===
Patrick Division
	GP	W	L	T	GF	GA	Pts
**Washington Capitals**	80	41	29	10	305	259	92
**Pittsburgh Penguins**	80	40	33	7	347	349	87
**New York Rangers**	80	37	35	8	310	307	82
**Philadelphia Flyers**	80	36	36	8	307	285	80
New Jersey Devils	80	27	41	12	281	325	66
New York Islanders	80	28	47	5	265	325	61

Note: GP = Games played, W = Wins, L = Losses, T = Ties, Pts = Points, GF = Goals for, GA = Goals against
Note: Teams that qualified for the playoffs are highlighted in bold.

=== Record vs. opponents ===
==== Vs. Wales Conference ====
**Vs. Patrick Division**

1988–89 NHL records
Team	**NJD**	**NYI**	**NYR**	**PHI**	**PIT**	**WSH**	**Total**
New Jersey	—	1–4–2	4–3	2–5	1–4–2	4–3	12–19–4
N.Y. Islanders	4–1–2	—	2–5	1–5–1	2–4–1	3–4	12–19–4
N.Y. Rangers	3–4	5–2	—	3–3–1	3–3–1	3–2–2	17–14–4
Philadelphia	5–2	5–1–1	3–3–1	—	3–4	3–4	19–14–2
Pittsburgh	4–1–2	4–2–1	3–3–1	4–3	—	4–3	19–12–4
Washington	3–4	4–3	2–3–2	4–3	3–4	—	16–17–2

**Vs. Adams Division**

1988–89 NHL records
Team	**BOS**	**BUF**	**HFD**	**MTL**	**QUE**	**Total**
New Jersey	0–2–1	1–2	1–2	0–3	1–2	3–11–1
N.Y. Islanders	1–2	0–3	1–2	2–1	2–1	6–9–0
N.Y. Rangers	0–1–2	0–3	1–2	0–3	2–1	3–10–2
Philadelphia	1–2	2–1	1–1–1	0–1–2	2–1	6–6–3
Pittsburgh	1–1–1	1–2	1–2	1–2	1–2	5–9–1
Washington	1–1–1	3–0	3–0	1–1–1	2–0–1	10–2–3

==== Vs. Campbell Conference ====
**Vs. Norris Division**

1988–89 NHL records
Team	**CHI**	**DET**	**MIN**	**STL**	**TOR**	**Total**
New Jersey	2–1	2–0–1	1–1–1	2–1	2–1	9–4–2
N.Y. Islanders	0–3	0–3	2–1	1–2	1–2	4–11–0
N.Y. Rangers	2–0–1	0–3	2–1	3–0	1–1–1	8–5–2
Philadelphia	3–0	1–2	2–1	0–3	2–1	8–7–0
Pittsburgh	3–0	2–0–1	1–2	1–1–1	2–1	9–4–2
Washington	2–1	1–1–1	1–1–1	2–0–1	2–1	8–4–3

**Vs. Smythe Division**

1988–89 NHL records
Team	**CGY**	**EDM**	**LAK**	**VAN**	**WIN**	**Total**
New Jersey	0–3	2–1	0–1–2	1–1–1	0–1–2	3–7–5
N.Y. Islanders	0–2–1	1–2	1–2	2–1	2–1	6–8–1
N.Y. Rangers	1–2	1–2	2–1	3–0	2–1	9–6–0
Philadelphia	0–3	0–1–2	1–2	0–3	2–0–1	3–9–3
Pittsburgh	1–2	1–2	1–2	2–1	2–1	7–8–0
Washington	0–2–1	2–1	1–1–1	2–1	2–1	7–6–2

== Schedule and results ==
1988–89 regular season
October

Game	Result	Date	Score	Opponent	Record
1	T	October 6, 1988	4–4 OT	@ Calgary Flames (1988–89)	0–0–1
2	L	October 7, 1988	1–5	@ Edmonton Oilers (1988–89)	0–1–1
3	L	October 9, 1988	5–6 OT	@ Los Angeles Kings (1988–89)	0–2–1
4	W	October 10, 1988	3–2	@ Vancouver Canucks (1988–89)	1–2–1
5	W	October 15, 1988	2–1	Montreal Canadiens (1988–89)	2–2–1
6	W	October 18, 1988	3–2	Vancouver Canucks (1988–89)	3–2–1
7	W	October 22, 1988	7–3	Quebec Nordiques (1988–89)	4–2–1
8	L	October 25, 1988	3–4	Toronto Maple Leafs (1988–89)	4–3–1
9	L	October 27, 1988	2–5	@ Philadelphia Flyers (1988–89)	4–4–1
10	L	October 29, 1988	2–3 OT	@ Quebec Nordiques (1988–89)	4–5–1

November

Game	Result	Date	Score	Opponent	Record
11	L	November 1, 1988	1–8	Winnipeg Jets (1988–89)	4–6–1
12	L	November 4, 1988	2–4	@ Washington Capitals (1988–89)	4–7–1
13	W	November 5, 1988	4–3 OT	Washington Capitals (1988–89)	5–7–1
14	W	November 8, 1988	4–3	New York Rangers (1988–89)	6–7–1
15	T	November 11, 1988	3–3 OT	@ New Jersey Devils (1988–89)	6–7–2
16	L	November 12, 1988	0–3	Buffalo Sabres (1988–89)	6–8–2
17	L	November 15, 1988	1–5	Calgary Flames (1988–89)	6–9–2
18	L	November 16, 1988	4–5 OT	@ Montreal Canadiens (1988–89)	6–10–2
19	W	November 19, 1988	6–3	Pittsburgh Penguins (1988–89)	7–10–2
20	L	November 22, 1988	2–4	Washington Capitals (1988–89)	7–11–2
21	L	November 23, 1988	6–7	@ Washington Capitals (1988–89)	7–12–2
22	L	November 26, 1988	4–6	New York Rangers (1988–89)	7–13–2
23	L	November 27, 1988	3–5	@ New York Rangers (1988–89)	7–14–2
24	L	November 29, 1988	3–5	@ Detroit Red Wings (1988–89)	7–15–2

December

Game	Result	Date	Score	Opponent	Record
25	L	December 1, 1988	0–8	@ St. Louis Blues (1988–89)	7–16–2
26	L	December 3, 1988	2–4	@ Pittsburgh Penguins (1988–89)	7–17–2
27	L	December 6, 1988	3–4	Boston Bruins (1988–89)	7–18–2
28	L	December 9, 1988	5–6	@ New Jersey Devils (1988–89)	7–19–2
29	L	December 10, 1988	3–4	Los Angeles Kings (1988–89)	7–20–2
30	L	December 14, 1988	1–2	@ New York Rangers (1988–89)	7–21–2
31	L	December 15, 1988	2–8	Pittsburgh Penguins (1988–89)	7–22–2
32	W	December 17, 1988	5–2	New Jersey Devils (1988–89)	8–22–2
33	L	December 20, 1988	3–5	@ Pittsburgh Penguins (1988–89)	8–23–2
34	L	December 22, 1988	2–4	Philadelphia Flyers (1988–89)	8–24–2
35	W	December 26, 1988	4–3	@ Toronto Maple Leafs (1988–89)	9–24–2
36	W	December 31, 1988	6–4	Washington Capitals (1988–89)	10–24–2

January

Game	Result	Date	Score	Opponent	Record
37	L	January 3, 1989	1–4	Philadelphia Flyers (1988–89)	10–25–2
38	W	January 5, 1989	5–3	@ Boston Bruins (1988–89)	11–25–2
39	L	January 7, 1989	1–5	New York Rangers (1988–89)	11–26–2
40	L	January 8, 1989	2–3	@ Chicago Blackhawks (1988–89)	11–27–2
41	L	January 10, 1989	3–5	@ Pittsburgh Penguins (1988–89)	11–28–2
42	W	January 13, 1989	5–3	@ New Jersey Devils (1988–89)	12–28–2
43	L	January 14, 1989	3–5	Chicago Blackhawks (1988–89)	12–29–2
44	W	January 17, 1989	5–2	Pittsburgh Penguins (1988–89)	13–29–2
45	W	January 19, 1989	4–2	Los Angeles Kings (1988–89)	14–29–2
46	W	January 21, 1989	8–6	Minnesota North Stars (1988–89)	15–29–2
47	T	January 24, 1989	2–2 OT	New Jersey Devils (1988–89)	15–29–3
48	W	January 26, 1989	8–6	Winnipeg Jets (1988–89)	16–29–3
49	L	January 28, 1989	4–7	@ Philadelphia Flyers (1988–89)	16–30–3
50	L	January 30, 1989	3–7	@ New York Rangers (1988–89)	16–31–3

February

Game	Result	Date	Score	Opponent	Record
51	L	February 2, 1989	1–4	Toronto Maple Leafs (1988–89)	16–32–3
52	W	February 4, 1989	5–3	Hartford Whalers (1988–89)	17–32–3
53	W	February 5, 1989	3–2	@ Quebec Nordiques (1988–89)	18–32–3
54	L	February 10, 1989	1–3	@ Chicago Blackhawks (1988–89)	18–33–3
55	L	February 11, 1989	0–5	@ St. Louis Blues (1988–89)	18–34–3
56	W	February 14, 1989	5–3	Edmonton Oilers (1988–89)	19–34–3
57	W	February 16, 1989	7–3	St. Louis Blues (1988–89)	20–34–3
58	W	February 18, 1989	3–2	Philadelphia Flyers (1988–89)	21–34–3
59	L	February 19, 1989	4–5	@ Philadelphia Flyers (1988–89)	21–35–3
60	L	February 21, 1989	5–6	Detroit Red Wings (1988–89)	21–36–3
61	L	February 22, 1989	5–7	@ Buffalo Sabres (1988–89)	21–37–3
62	T	February 25, 1989	5–5 OT	Pittsburgh Penguins (1988–89)	21–37–4
63	L	February 28, 1989	1–3	Hartford Whalers (1988–89)	21–38–4

March

Game	Result	Date	Score	Opponent	Record
64	L	March 1, 1989	5–6	@ Detroit Red Wings (1988–89)	21–39–4
65	L	March 4, 1989	3–4	@ Minnesota North Stars (1988–89)	21–40–4
66	W	March 5, 1989	4–3	@ Winnipeg Jets (1988–89)	22–40–4
67	L	March 7, 1989	1–2	Boston Bruins (1988–89)	22–41–4
68	T	March 9, 1989	4–4 OT	Philadelphia Flyers (1988–89)	22–41–5
69	W	March 11, 1989	3–2 OT	New Jersey Devils (1988–89)	23–41–5
70	W	March 13, 1989	5–3	@ Montreal Canadiens (1988–89)	24–41–5
71	L	March 14, 1989	2–8	@ Hartford Whalers (1988–89)	24–42–5
72	L	March 18, 1989	1–2	@ Vancouver Canucks (1988–89)	24–43–5
73	L	March 19, 1989	2–3	@ Edmonton Oilers (1988–89)	24–44–5
74	L	March 21, 1989	1–4	@ Calgary Flames (1988–89)	24–45–5
75	W	March 23, 1989	3–1	Minnesota North Stars (1988–89)	25–45–5
76	L	March 26, 1989	2–3	@ Washington Capitals (1988–89)	25–46–5
77	W	March 28, 1989	5–4	Washington Capitals (1988–89)	26–46–5
78	W	March 29, 1989	5–4 OT	@ New Jersey Devils (1988–89)	27–46–5

April

Game	Result	Date	Score	Opponent	Record
79	L	April 1, 1989	3–4	Buffalo Sabres (1988–89)	27–47–5
80	W	April 2, 1989	6–4	@ New York Rangers (1988–89)	28–47–5

Legend: Win (2 points) Loss (0 points) Tie (1 point)

== Player statistics ==
=== Forwards ===
Note: GP= Games played; G= Goals; AST= Assists; PTS = Points; PIM = Points

Player	GP	G	AST	PTS	PIM
Pat LaFontaine	79	45	43	88	26
Brent Sutter	77	29	34	63	77
David Volek	77	25	34	59	24
Bryan Trottier	73	17	28	45	44
Mikko Mäkelä	76	17	28	45	22
Derek King	60	14	29	43	14
Alan Kerr	71	20	18	38	144
Randy Wood	77	15	13	28	44
Patrick Flatley	41	10	15	25	31
Brad Dalgarno	55	11	10	21	86
Greg Gilbert	55	8	13	21	45
Raimo Helminen	24	1	11	12	4
Tom Fitzgerald	23	3	5	8	10
Richard Kromm	20	1	6	7	4
Brad Lauer	14	3	2	5	2
Bob Bassen	19	1	4	5	21
Mick Vukota	48	2	2	4	237
Dale Henry	22	2	2	4	66
Bill Berg	7	1	2	3	10
Mike Walsh	13	2	0	2	4
Mike Stevens	9	1	0	1	14
Rob DiMaio	16	1	0	1	30
Rod Dallman	1	0	0	0	15

=== Defensemen ===
Note: GP= Games played; G= Goals; AST= Assists; PTS = Points; PIM = Points

Player	GP	G	AST	PTS	PIM
Gerald Diduck	65	11	21	32	155
Tomas Jonsson	53	9	23	32	34
Jeff Norton	69	1	30	31	74
Reed Larson	33	7	13	20	35
Marc Bergevin	58	2	13	15	62
Rich Pilon	62	0	14	14	242
Gary Nylund	46	4	8	12	74
Steve Konroyd	21	1	5	6	2
Ken Morrow	34	1	3	4	32
Wayne McBean	19	0	1	1	12
Dean Chynoweth	6	0	0	0	48
Chris Pryor	7	0	0	0	25
Jeff Finley	4	0	0	0	6

=== Goaltending ===
Note: GP= Games played; W= Wins; L= Losses; T = Ties; SO = Shutouts; GAA = Goals Against

Player	GP	W	L	T	SO	GAA
Kelly Hrudey	50	18	24	3	0	3.92
Jeff Hackett	13	4	7	0	0	3.53
Mark Fitzpatrick	11	3	5	2	0	3.92
Billy Smith	17	3	11	0	0	4.44

== Awards and records ==
- Bryan Trottier, King Clancy Memorial Trophy
- David Volek, Wing, NHL 1st All-Rookie Team

== Draft picks ==
New York's draft picks at the 1988 NHL entry draft held at the Montreal Forum in Montreal.

Round	#	Player	Nationality	College/Junior/Club team (League)
1	16	Kevin Cheveldayoff	Canada	Brandon Wheat Kings (WHL)
2	29	Wayne Doucet	Canada	Hamilton Steelhawks (OHL)
2	37	Sean LeBrun	Canada	New Westminster Bruins (WHL)
3	58	Danny Lorenz	Canada	Seattle Thunderbirds (WHL)
4	79	Andre Brassard	Canada	Trois-Rivières Draveurs (QMJHL)
5	100	Paul Rutherford	Canada	Ohio State University (CCHA)
6	111	Pavel Gross	Czechoslovakia	Sparta Prague (Czechoslovakia)
6	121	Jason Rathbone	United States	Brookline High School (USHS-MA)
7	142	Yves Gaucher	Canada	Chicoutimi Saguenéens (QMJHL)
8	163	Marty McInnis	United States	Milton Academy (USHS-MA)
9	173	Patrick Forrest	United States	St. Cloud State University (NCAA Independent)
9	184	Jeff Blumer	United States	College of St. Thomas (MIAC)
10	205	Jeff Kampersal	United States	St. John's Preparatory School (USHS-MA)
11	226	Phil Neururer	United States	Osseo Senior High School (USHS-MN)
12	247	Joe Capprini	United States	Babson College (NEWMAC)
S	21	Doug Melnyk	Canada	Western Michigan University (CCHA)
