= 1988–89 Boston Bruins season =

NHL team season

1988–89 Boston Bruins
- Division: 2nd Adams
- Conference: 3rd Wales
- 1988–89 record: 37–29–14
- Home record: 17–15–8
- Road record: 20–14–6
- Goals for: 289
- Goals against: 256

Team information
- General manager: Harry Sinden
- Coach: Terry O'Reilly
- Captain: Ray Bourque
- Arena: Boston Garden

Team leaders
- Goals: Cam Neely (37)
- Assists: Craig Janney (46)
- Points: Cam Neely (75)
- Penalty minutes: Lyndon Byers (218)
- Wins: Rejean Lemelin (19)
- Goals against average: Rejean Lemelin (3.01)

The 1988–89 Boston Bruins season saw the team finish in second place in the Adams Division with a record of 37 wins, 29 losses, and 14 ties for 88 points. They defeated the Buffalo Sabres in five games in the Division Semi-finals before falling to the Montreal Canadiens in the Division Finals, also in five games.

== Regular season ==
On November 24, 1988, Bob Sweeney scored just 8 seconds into the overtime period to give the Bruins a 2–1 home win over the Philadelphia Flyers. It would prove to be the fastest overtime goal scored during the 1988–89 NHL regular season.

The Bruins allowed the fewest short-handed goals in the league, with just 4.

=== Final standings ===
Adams Division
	GP	W	L	T	GF	GA	Pts
**Montreal Canadiens**	80	53	18	9	315	218	115
**Boston Bruins**	80	37	29	14	289	256	88
**Buffalo Sabres**	80	38	35	7	291	299	83
**Hartford Whalers**	80	37	38	5	299	290	79
Quebec Nordiques	80	27	46	7	269	342	61

Note: GP = Games played, W = Wins, L = Losses, T = Ties, Pts = Points, GF = Goals for, GA = Goals against
Note: Teams that qualified for the playoffs are highlighted in bold.

=== Record vs. opponents ===
==== Vs. Wales Conference ====
**Vs. Adams Division**

1988–89 NHL records
Team	**BOS**	**BUF**	**HFD**	**MTL**	**QUE**	**Total**
Boston	—	0–5–3	5–3	0–7–1	4–1–3	**9–16–7**
Buffalo	5–0–3	—	3–5	3–5	3–4–1	**14–13–5**
Hartford	3–5	5–3	—	1–7	4–3–1	**13–18–1**
Montreal	7–0–1	5–3	7–1	—	4–4	**23–8–1**
Quebec	1–4–3	4–3–1	3–4–1	4–4	—	**12–15–5**

**Vs. Patrick Division**

1988–89 NHL records
Team	**NJD**	**NYI**	**NYR**	**PHI**	**PIT**	**WSH**	**Total**
Boston	2–0–1	2–1	1–0–2	2–1	1–1–1	1–1–1	**9–4–5**
Buffalo	2–1	3–0	3–0	1–2	2–1	0–3	**11–7–0**
Hartford	2–1	2–1	2–1	1–1–1	2–1	0–3	**9–8–1**
Montreal	3–0	1–2	3–0	1–0–2	2–1	1–1–1	**11–4–3**
Quebec	2–1	1–2	1–2	1–2	2–1	0–2–1	**7–10–1**

==== Vs. Campbell Conference ====
**Vs. Norris Division**

1988–89 NHL records
Team	**CHI**	**DET**	**MIN**	**STL**	**TOR**	**Total**
Boston	3–0	0–2–1	0–2–1	3–0	3–0	**9–4–2**
Buffalo	2–1	3–0	0–1–2	1–2	2–1	**8–5–2**
Hartford	2–1	2–1	2–1	1–0–2	2–1	**9–4–2**
Montreal	1–0–2	1–2	1–0–2	2–0–1	2–1	**7–3–5**
Quebec	0–2–1	2–1	2–1	0–3	0–3	**4–10–1**

**Vs. Smythe Division**

1988–89 NHL records
Team	**CGY**	**EDM**	**LAK**	**VAN**	**WIN**	**Total**
Boston	1–2	3–0	2–1	2–1	2–1	**10–5–0**
Buffalo	2–1	0–2–1	0–3	1–2	2–1	**5–9–1**
Hartford	1–2	1–2	1–2	1–1–1	2–1	**6–8–1**
Montreal	2–1	2–1	3–0	3–0	2–1	**12–3–0**
Quebec	1–2	0–3	0–3	1–2	2–1	**4–11–0**

== Schedule and results ==
1988–89 regular season
October

Game	Result	Date	Score	Opponent	Record
1	W	October 6, 1988	2–1	Toronto Maple Leafs (1988–89)	1–0–0
2	W	October 8, 1988	6–2	@ Hartford Whalers (1988–89)	2–0–0
3	W	October 9, 1988	3–1	Hartford Whalers (1988–89)	3–0–0
4	L	October 12, 1988	2–6	@ Los Angeles Kings (1988–89)	3–1–0
5	L	October 15, 1988	1–5	@ Minnesota North Stars (1988–89)	3–2–0
6	W	October 16, 1988	10–3	@ Chicago Blackhawks (1988–89)	4–2–0
7	W	October 19, 1988	5–2	@ Winnipeg Jets (1988–89)	5–2–0
8	W	October 22, 1988	5–2	@ St. Louis Blues (1988–89)	6–2–0
9	T	October 25, 1988	1–1 OT	Montreal Canadiens (1988–89)	6–2–1
10	W	October 27, 1988	6–2	Quebec Nordiques (1988–89)	7–2–1
11	T	October 29, 1988	3–3 OT	Buffalo Sabres (1988–89)	7–2–2
12	T	October 30, 1988	3–3 OT	@ Buffalo Sabres (1988–89)	7–2–3

November

Game	Result	Date	Score	Opponent	Record
13	W	November 2, 1988	7–2	@ Toronto Maple Leafs (1988–89)	8–2–3
14	L	November 3, 1988	3–5	Hartford Whalers (1988–89)	8–3–3
15	W	November 6, 1988	4–2	Vancouver Canucks (1988–89)	9–3–3
16	T	November 11, 1988	4–4 OT	@ New York Rangers (1988–89)	9–3–4
17	L	November 12, 1988	1–2	Calgary Flames (1988–89)	9–4–4
18	T	November 15, 1988	5–5 OT	@ Quebec Nordiques (1988–89)	9–4–5
19	L	November 17, 1988	2–5	Montreal Canadiens (1988–89)	9–5–5
20	L	November 18, 1988	2–5	@ Detroit Red Wings (1988–89)	9–6–5
21	L	November 20, 1988	4–5 OT	Detroit Red Wings (1988–89)	9–7–5
22	L	November 23, 1988	0–2	@ Montreal Canadiens (1988–89)	9–8–5
23	W	November 24, 1988	2–1 OT	Philadelphia Flyers (1988–89)	10–8–5
24	W	November 26, 1988	8–2	Chicago Blackhawks (1988–89)	11–8–5
25	L	November 29, 1988	1–5	@ Philadelphia Flyers (1988–89)	11–9–5

December

Game	Result	Date	Score	Opponent	Record
26	L	December 1, 1988	1–4	Minnesota North Stars (1988–89)	11–10–5
27	T	December 3, 1988	1–1 OT	@ Washington Capitals (1988–89)	11–10–6
28	T	December 4, 1988	3–3 OT	Pittsburgh Penguins (1988–89)	11–10–7
29	W	December 6, 1988	4–3	@ New York Islanders (1988–89)	12–10–7
30	L	December 8, 1988	2–4	Buffalo Sabres (1988–89)	12–11–7
31	T	December 10, 1988	1–1 OT	New York Rangers (1988–89)	12–11–8
32	L	December 12, 1988	1–3	@ Montreal Canadiens (1988–89)	12–12–8
33	W	December 15, 1988	4–3 OT	Edmonton Oilers (1988–89)	13–12–8
34	T	December 17, 1988	2–2 OT	Quebec Nordiques (1988–89)	13–12–9
35	L	December 18, 1988	2–4	@ Quebec Nordiques (1988–89)	13–13–9
36	W	December 21, 1988	4–3	@ Hartford Whalers (1988–89)	14–13–9
37	L	December 22, 1988	2–4	Montreal Canadiens (1988–89)	14–14–9
38	L	December 26, 1988	1–2	@ Buffalo Sabres (1988–89)	14–15–9
39	W	December 29, 1988	6–2	@ New Jersey Devils (1988–89)	15–15–9

January

Game	Result	Date	Score	Opponent	Record
40	W	January 2, 1989	8–7	St. Louis Blues (1988–89)	16–15–9
41	L	January 5, 1989	3–5	New York Islanders (1988–89)	16–16–9
42	L	January 7, 1989	1–3	@ Montreal Canadiens (1988–89)	16–17–9
43	W	January 8, 1989	4–2	@ Quebec Nordiques (1988–89)	17–17–9
44	L	January 12, 1989	3–5	Montreal Canadiens (1988–89)	17–18–9
45	T	January 14, 1989	5–5 OT	Detroit Red Wings (1988–89)	17–18–10
46	W	January 15, 1989	4–3	@ Washington Capitals (1988–89)	18–18–10
47	L	January 19, 1989	2–7	Calgary Flames (1988–89)	18–19–10
48	L	January 21, 1989	5–6 OT	Buffalo Sabres (1988–89)	18–20–10
49	L	January 22, 1989	4–6	@ Buffalo Sabres (1988–89)	18–21–10
50	W	January 25, 1989	2–1 OT	@ Toronto Maple Leafs (1988–89)	19–21–10
51	W	January 26, 1989	4–2	St. Louis Blues (1988–89)	20–21–10
52	L	January 28, 1989	3–4	Winnipeg Jets (1988–89)	20–22–10

February

Game	Result	Date	Score	Opponent	Record
53	T	February 1, 1989	4–4 OT	@ Minnesota North Stars (1988–89)	20–22–11
54	W	February 3, 1989	4–2	@ Winnipeg Jets (1988–89)	21–22–11
55	L	February 5, 1989	2–5	Pittsburgh Penguins (1988–89)	21–23–11
56	W	February 9, 1989	4–1	Los Angeles Kings (1988–89)	22–23–11
57	W	February 11, 1989	5–2	Edmonton Oilers (1988–89)	23–23–11
58	L	February 14, 1989	2–5	@ Vancouver Canucks (1988–89)	23–24–11
59	W	February 15, 1989	7–3	@ Los Angeles Kings (1988–89)	24–24–11
60	W	February 18, 1989	4–3	@ Calgary Flames (1988–89)	25–24–11
61	W	February 19, 1989	4–2	@ Edmonton Oilers (1988–89)	26–24–11
62	W	February 25, 1989	9–1	@ Hartford Whalers (1988–89)	27–24–11
63	T	February 28, 1989	3–3 OT	@ New Jersey Devils (1988–89)	27–24–12

March

Game	Result	Date	Score	Opponent	Record
64	W	March 2, 1989	5–2	Quebec Nordiques (1988–89)	28–24–12
65	W	March 4, 1989	6–4	Vancouver Canucks (1988–89)	29–24–12
66	W	March 5, 1989	5–0	@ New York Rangers (1988–89)	30–24–12
67	W	March 7, 1989	2–1	@ New York Islanders (1988–89)	31–24–12
68	L	March 9, 1989	2–7	Washington Capitals (1988–89)	31–25–12
69	T	March 11, 1989	6–6 OT	Buffalo Sabres (1988–89)	31–25–13
70	L	March 12, 1989	2–3	@ Buffalo Sabres (1988–89)	31–26–13
71	W	March 14, 1989	8–2	@ Pittsburgh Penguins (1988–89)	32–26–13
72	T	March 16, 1989	2–2 OT	Quebec Nordiques (1988–89)	32–26–14
73	W	March 18, 1989	6–3	Philadelphia Flyers (1988–89)	33–26–14
74	L	March 19, 1989	2–3	Hartford Whalers (1988–89)	33–27–14
75	L	March 22, 1989	2–4	@ Hartford Whalers (1988–89)	33–28–14
76	W	March 23, 1989	5–3	New Jersey Devils (1988–89)	34–28–14
77	W	March 25, 1989	6–3	Chicago Blackhawks (1988–89)	35–28–14
78	L	March 27, 1989	2–5	@ Montreal Canadiens (1988–89)	35–29–14

April

Game	Result	Date	Score	Opponent	Record
79	W	April 1, 1989	5–4	@ Quebec Nordiques (1988–89)	36–29–14
80	W	April 2, 1989	3–2	Hartford Whalers (1988–89)	37–29–14

Legend: Win (2 points) Loss (0 points) Tie (1 point)

== Playoffs ==
1989 Stanley Cup playoffs
Adams Division Semifinals vs. (A3) Buffalo Sabres – Bruins win 4–1

Game	Date	Visitor	Score	Home	Series
1	April 5	Buffalo Sabres	6–0	Boston Bruins	0–1
2	April 6	Buffalo Sabres	3–5	Boston Bruins	1–1
3	April 8	Boston Bruins	4–2	Buffalo Sabres	2–1
4	April 9	Boston Bruins	3–2	Buffalo Sabres	3–1
5	April 11	Buffalo Sabres	1–4	Boston Bruins	4–1

Adams Division Finals vs. (A1) Montreal Canadiens – Canadiens win 4–1

Game	Date	Visitor	Score	Home	Series
1	April 17	Boston Bruins	2–3	Montreal Canadiens	0–1
2	April 19	Boston Bruins	2–3 (OT)	Montreal Canadiens	0–2
3	April 21	Montreal Canadiens	5–4	Boston Bruins	0–3
4	April 23	Montreal Canadiens	2–3	Boston Bruins	1–3
5	April 25	Boston Bruins	2–3	Montreal Canadiens	1–4

Legend: Win Loss

== Player statistics ==
=== Forwards ===
Note: GP = Games played; G = Goals; A = Assists; Pts = Points; PIM = Penalty minutes

Player	GP	G	A	Pts	PIM
Cam Neely	74	37	38	75	190
Ken Linseman	78	27	45	72	164
Craig Janney	62	16	46	62	12
Randy Burridge	80	31	30	61	39
Bob Joyce	77	18	31	49	46
Andy Brickley	71	13	22	35	20
Keith Crowder	69	15	18	33	147
Bob Sweeney	75	14	14	28	99
Steve Kasper	49	10	16	26	49
John Carter	44	12	10	22	24
Greg Johnston	57	11	9	20	32
Bobby Carpenter	18	5	9	14	10
Tommy Lehmann	26	4	2	6	10
Jay Miller	37	2	4	6	168
Ray Neufeld	14	1	3	4	28
Lyndon Byers	49	0	4	4	218
Bill O'Dwyer	19	1	2	3	8
Paul Guay	5	0	2	2	0
Rob Cimetta	7	2	0	2	0
Ray Podloski	8	0	1	1	17
Ron Flockhart	4	0	0	0	0
Moe Lemay	12	0	0	0	33
Carl Mokosak	7	0	0	0	31
Paul Beraldo	7	0	0	0	4

=== Defensemen ===
Note: GP = Games played; G = Goals; A = Assists; Pts = Points; PIM = Penalty minutes

Player	GP	G	A	Pts	PIM
Ray Bourque	60	18	43	61	52
Glen Wesley	77	19	35	54	61
Greg Hawgood	56	16	24	40	84
Garry Galley	78	8	22	30	80
Michael Thelven	40	3	18	21	71
Don Sweeney	36	3	5	8	20
Allen Pedersen	51	0	6	6	69
Alain Cote	31	2	3	5	51
Bruce Shoebottom	29	1	3	4	44
Stephane Quintal	26	0	1	1	29
Gord Kluzak	3	0	1	1	2
Dale Dunbar	1	0	0	0	0

=== Goaltending ===
Note: GP = Games played; W = Wins; L = Losses; T = Ties; SO = Shutouts; GAA = Goals against average

Player	GP	W	L	T	SO	GAA
Rejean Lemelin	40	19	15	6	0	3.01
Andy Moog	41	18	14	8	1	3.22

== Awards and records ==
- Ray Bourque, Defense, NHL Second All-Star Team

== Draft picks ==
Boston's draft picks at the 1988 NHL entry draft held at the Montreal Forum in Montreal.

Round	#	Player	Nationality	College/Junior/Club team (League)
1	19	Robert Cimetta	Canada	Toronto Marlboros (OHL)
3	60	Steve Heinze	United States	Lawrence Academy (USHS-MA)
4	81	Joe Juneau	Canada	Rensselaer Polytechnic Institute (ECAC)
5	102	Daniel Murphy	United States	The Gunnery (USHS-CT)
6	123	Derek Geary	United States	Gloucester High School (USHS-MA)
8	165	Mark Krys	Canada	Boston University (Hockey East)
9	186	Jon Rohloff	United States	Grand Rapids High School (USHS-MA)
11	228	Eric Reisman	United States	Ohio State University (CCHA)
12	249	Doug Jones	Canada	Kitchener Rangers (OHL)
S	23	Chris Harvey	United States	Brown University (ECAC)
