= 1988–89 Buffalo Sabres season =

NHL hockey team season

1988–89 Buffalo Sabres
- Division: 3rd Adams
- Conference: 5th Wales
- 1988–89 record: 38–35–7
- Home record: 25–12–3
- Road record: 13–23–4
- Goals for: 291
- Goals against: 299

Team information
- General manager: Gerry Meehan
- Coach: Ted Sator
- Captain: Lindy Ruff (Oct–Mar); Mike Foligno (Mar–Apr)
- Alternate captains: Mike Foligno (Oct–Mar); Phil Housley
- Arena: Buffalo Memorial Auditorium

Team leaders
- Goals: Pierre Turgeon (34)
- Assists: Pierre Turgeon (54)
- Points: Pierre Turgeon (88)
- Penalty minutes: Mike Hartman (316)
- Wins: Daren Puppa (17)
- Goals against average: Clint Malarchuk (2.39)

The 1988–89 Buffalo Sabres season, the team's 19th season of existence, saw the Sabres finish in third place in the Adams Division with a record of 38 wins, 35 losses, and 7 ties for 83 points. They lost the Division Semifinals in five games to the Boston Bruins.

== Regular season ==
=== Clint Malarchuk incident ===
On March 22, 1989, a horrific incident occurred during a game between the Sabres and the St. Louis Blues at the Buffalo Memorial Auditorium, when Buffalo goaltender Clint Malarchuk had his jugular vein severed by the skate blade of the Blues' Steve Tuttle during a goal mouth collision. According to reports, eleven fans in the stands fainted, two more had heart attacks, and three players vomited on the ice. The Sabres' training staff was immediately on the scene, and Malarchuk eventually needed 300 stitches to close the wound. Malarchuk spent only one night in the hospital before returning to practice four days later and was back on the ice within 10 days.

=== Season standings ===
Adams Division
	GP	W	L	T	GF	GA	Pts
**Montreal Canadiens**	80	53	18	9	315	218	115
**Boston Bruins**	80	37	29	14	289	256	88
**Buffalo Sabres**	80	38	35	7	291	299	83
**Hartford Whalers**	80	37	38	5	299	290	79
Quebec Nordiques	80	27	46	7	269	342	61

Note: GP = Games played, W = Wins, L = Losses, T = Ties, Pts = Points, GF = Goals for, GA = Goals against
Note: Teams that qualified for the playoffs are highlighted in bold.

=== Record vs. opponents ===
==== Vs. Wales Conference ====
**Vs. Adams Division**

1988–89 NHL records
Team	**BOS**	**BUF**	**HFD**	**MTL**	**QUE**	**Total**
Boston	—	0–5–3	5–3	0–7–1	4–1–3	**9–16–7**
Buffalo	5–0–3	—	3–5	3–5	3–4–1	**14–13–5**
Hartford	3–5	5–3	—	1–7	4–3–1	**13–18–1**
Montreal	7–0–1	5–3	7–1	—	4–4	**23–8–1**
Quebec	1–4–3	4–3–1	3–4–1	4–4	—	**12–15–5**

**Vs. Patrick Division**

1988–89 NHL records
Team	**NJD**	**NYI**	**NYR**	**PHI**	**PIT**	**WSH**	**Total**
Boston	2–0–1	2–1	1–0–2	2–1	1–1–1	1–1–1	**9–4–5**
Buffalo	2–1	3–0	3–0	1–2	2–1	0–3	**11–7–0**
Hartford	2–1	2–1	2–1	1–1–1	2–1	0–3	**9–8–1**
Montreal	3–0	1–2	3–0	1–0–2	2–1	1–1–1	**11–4–3**
Quebec	2–1	1–2	1–2	1–2	2–1	0–2–1	**7–10–1**

==== Vs. Campbell Conference ====
**Vs. Norris Division**

1988–89 NHL records
Team	**CHI**	**DET**	**MIN**	**STL**	**TOR**	**Total**
Boston	3–0	0–2–1	0–2–1	3–0	3–0	**9–4–2**
Buffalo	2–1	3–0	0–1–2	1–2	2–1	**8–5–2**
Hartford	2–1	2–1	2–1	1–0–2	2–1	**9–4–2**
Montreal	1–0–2	1–2	1–0–2	2–0–1	2–1	**7–3–5**
Quebec	0–2–1	2–1	2–1	0–3	0–3	**4–10–1**

**Vs. Smythe Division**

1988–89 NHL records
Team	**CGY**	**EDM**	**LAK**	**VAN**	**WIN**	**Total**
Boston	1–2	3–0	2–1	2–1	2–1	**10–5–0**
Buffalo	2–1	0–2–1	0–3	1–2	2–1	**5–9–1**
Hartford	1–2	1–2	1–2	1–1–1	2–1	**6–8–1**
Montreal	2–1	2–1	3–0	3–0	2–1	**12–3–0**
Quebec	1–2	0–3	0–3	1–2	2–1	**4–11–0**

== Schedule and results ==
1988–89 regular season
October

Game	Result	Date	Score	Opponent	Record
1	W	October 6, 1988	3–2	Montreal Canadiens (1988–89)	1–0–0
2	L	October 8, 1988	2–6	@ Washington Capitals (1988–89)	1–1–0
3	L	October 9, 1988	3–4 OT	@ Philadelphia Flyers (1988–89)	1–2–0
4	W	October 12, 1988	8–5	Pittsburgh Penguins (1988–89)	2–2–0
5	W	October 14, 1988	5–4	@ Quebec Nordiques (1988–89)	3–2–0
6	L	October 16, 1988	3–5	Quebec Nordiques (1988–89)	3–3–0
7	L	October 19, 1988	2–4	@ Toronto Maple Leafs (1988–89)	3–4–0
8	W	October 21, 1988	5–3	Montreal Canadiens (1988–89)	4–4–0
9	L	October 22, 1988	3–4	@ Montreal Canadiens (1988–89)	4–5–0
10	W	October 25, 1988	7–4	@ New Jersey Devils (1988–89)	5–5–0
11	L	October 26, 1988	1–7	Hartford Whalers (1988–89)	5–6–0
12	T	October 29, 1988	3–3 OT	@ Boston Bruins (1988–89)	5–6–1
13	T	October 30, 1988	3–3 OT	Boston Bruins (1988–89)	5–6–2

November

Game	Result	Date	Score	Opponent	Record
14	W	November 2, 1988	6–4	New York Rangers (1988–89)	6–6–2
15	L	November 4, 1988	3–7	@ Edmonton Oilers (1988–89)	6–7–2
16	L	November 5, 1988	0–9	@ Calgary Flames (1988–89)	6–8–2
17	W	November 9, 1988	3–2	Calgary Flames (1988–89)	7–8–2
18	W	November 12, 1988	3–0	@ New York Islanders (1988–89)	8–8–2
19	L	November 13, 1988	4–5 OT	Edmonton Oilers (1988–89)	8–9–2
20	L	November 16, 1988	2–3	@ Chicago Blackhawks (1988–89)	8–10–2
21	L	November 19, 1988	4–5	@ Los Angeles Kings (1988–89)	8–11–2
22	L	November 22, 1988	2–4	@ Vancouver Canucks (1988–89)	8–12–2
23	W	November 25, 1988	5–4 OT	Chicago Blackhawks (1988–89)	9–12–2
24	W	November 27, 1988	7–3	Philadelphia Flyers (1988–89)	10–12–2
25	W	November 30, 1988	6–2	Quebec Nordiques (1988–89)	11–12–2

December

Game	Result	Date	Score	Opponent	Record
26	L	December 2, 1988	1–6	Hartford Whalers (1988–89)	11–13–2
27	L	December 3, 1988	2–3 OT	@ Montreal Canadiens (1988–89)	11–14–2
28	L	December 6, 1988	0–9	@ Hartford Whalers (1988–89)	11–15–2
29	W	December 8, 1988	4–2	@ Boston Bruins (1988–89)	12–15–2
30	L	December 11, 1988	4–6	Washington Capitals (1988–89)	12–16–2
31	L	December 14, 1988	3–4	@ Winnipeg Jets (1988–89)	12–17–2
32	T	December 15, 1988	2–2 OT	@ Minnesota North Stars (1988–89)	12–17–3
33	T	December 19, 1988	5–5 OT	Edmonton Oilers (1988–89)	12–17–4
34	W	December 21, 1988	5–2	@ New York Rangers (1988–89)	13–17–4
35	W	December 23, 1988	5–2	Toronto Maple Leafs (1988–89)	14–17–4
36	W	December 26, 1988	2–1	Boston Bruins (1988–89)	15–17–4
37	W	December 28, 1988	4–1	Detroit Red Wings (1988–89)	16–17–4
38	L	December 30, 1988	3–5	@ Washington Capitals (1988–89)	16–18–4
39	L	December 31, 1988	2–3	Philadelphia Flyers (1988–89)	16–19–4

January

Game	Result	Date	Score	Opponent	Record
40	L	January 4, 1989	4–5 OT	Hartford Whalers (1988–89)	16–20–4
41	L	January 6, 1989	4–5	@ New Jersey Devils (1988–89)	16–21–4
42	W	January 7, 1989	6–1	@ Toronto Maple Leafs (1988–89)	17–21–4
43	W	January 12, 1989	6–5	Chicago Blackhawks (1988–89)	18–21–4
44	T	January 14, 1989	1–1 OT	@ Quebec Nordiques (1988–89)	18–21–5
45	W	January 15, 1989	3–2	Calgary Flames (1988–89)	19–21–5
46	T	January 18, 1989	3–3 OT	Minnesota North Stars (1988–89)	19–21–6
47	W	January 21, 1989	6–5 OT	@ Boston Bruins (1988–89)	20–21–6
48	W	January 22, 1989	6–4	Boston Bruins (1988–89)	21–21–6
49	W	January 25, 1989	6–3	@ Detroit Red Wings (1988–89)	22–21–6
50	W	January 27, 1989	4–2	Montreal Canadiens (1988–89)	23–21–6
51	L	January 28, 1989	1–2	@ Montreal Canadiens (1988–89)	23–22–6
52	W	January 31, 1989	5–3	@ Hartford Whalers (1988–89)	24–22–6

February

Game	Result	Date	Score	Opponent	Record
53	L	February 2, 1989	3–7	@ St. Louis Blues (1988–89)	24–23–6
54	L	February 4, 1989	3–5	@ Los Angeles Kings (1988–89)	24–24–6
55	L	February 9, 1989	2–5	@ Hartford Whalers (1988–89)	24–25–6
56	L	February 10, 1989	4–5	Vancouver Canucks (1988–89)	24–26–6
57	W	February 12, 1989	5–2	St. Louis Blues (1988–89)	25–26–6
58	L	February 14, 1989	3–7	@ Pittsburgh Penguins (1988–89)	25–27–6
59	W	February 15, 1989	5–3	New Jersey Devils (1988–89)	26–27–6
60	W	February 17, 1989	5–1	Pittsburgh Penguins (1988–89)	27–27–6
61	W	February 19, 1989	8–4	Detroit Red Wings (1988–89)	28–27–6
62	W	February 22, 1989	7–5	New York Islanders (1988–89)	29–27–6
63	W	February 24, 1989	5–4	Winnipeg Jets (1988–89)	30–27–6
64	L	February 25, 1989	1–6	@ Montreal Canadiens (1988–89)	30–28–6

March

Game	Result	Date	Score	Opponent	Record
65	L	March 1, 1989	4–5	Los Angeles Kings (1988–89)	30–29–6
66	L	March 4, 1989	2–6	@ Quebec Nordiques (1988–89)	30–30–6
67	L	March 5, 1989	2–8	Quebec Nordiques (1988–89)	30–31–6
68	W	March 8, 1989	2–0	@ New York Rangers (1988–89)	31–31–6
69	T	March 11, 1989	6–6 OT	@ Boston Bruins (1988–89)	31–31–7
70	W	March 12, 1989	3–2	Boston Bruins (1988–89)	32–31–7
71	W	March 16, 1989	6–1	@ Hartford Whalers (1988–89)	33–31–7
72	L	March 18, 1989	0–3	@ Minnesota North Stars (1988–89)	33–32–7
73	W	March 20, 1989	4–1	@ Winnipeg Jets (1988–89)	34–32–7
74	L	March 22, 1989	1–2	St. Louis Blues (1988–89)	34–33–7
75	W	March 24, 1989	5–2	Vancouver Canucks (1988–89)	35–33–7
76	L	March 25, 1989	1–4	@ Quebec Nordiques (1988–89)	35–34–7
77	W	March 28, 1989	4–2	Hartford Whalers (1988–89)	36–34–7
78	L	March 30, 1989	2–4	Montreal Canadiens (1988–89)	36–35–7

April

Game	Result	Date	Score	Opponent	Record
79	W	April 1, 1989	4–3	@ New York Islanders (1988–89)	37–35–7
80	W	April 2, 1989	4–2	Quebec Nordiques (1988–89)	38–35–7

Legend: Win (2 points) Loss (0 points) Tie (1 point)

== Playoffs ==
=== Division semifinals ===
1989 Stanley Cup playoffs Buffalo Sabres vs. Boston Bruins

Date	Away	Score	Home	Score	Notes
April 5	Buffalo Sabres	6	Boston Bruins	0	
April 6	Buffalo Sabres	3	Boston Bruins	5	
April 8	Boston Bruins	4	Buffalo Sabres	2	
April 9	Boston Bruins	3	Buffalo Sabres	2	
April 11	Buffalo Sabres	1	Boston Bruins	4	

Boston wins best-of-seven series 4 games to 1

== Player statistics ==
=== Forwards ===
Note: GP = Games played; G = Goals; A = Assists; Pts = Points; PIM = Penalties in minutes

Player	GP	G	A	Pts	PIM
Pierre Turgeon	80	34	54	88	26
Christian Ruuttu	67	14	46	60	98
Dave Andreychuk	56	28	24	52	40
Mike Foligno	75	27	22	49	156
Benoit Hogue	69	14	30	44	120
John Tucker	60	13	31	44	31
Ray Sheppard	67	22	21	43	15
Scott Arniel	80	18	23	41	46
Rick Vaive	28	19	13	32	64
Mark Napier	66	11	17	28	33
Kevin Maguire	60	8	10	18	241
Jeff Parker	57	9	9	18	82
Adam Creighton	24	7	10	17	44
Mike Hartman	70	8	9	17	316
Mike Donnelly	22	4	6	10	10
Ken Priestlay	15	2	0	2	2
Scott Metcalfe	9	1	1	2	13
Jan Ludvig	13	0	2	2	39
Mikael Andersson	14	0	1	1	4
Trent Kaese	1	0	0	0	0
Darrin Shannon	3	0	0	0	0

=== Defensemen ===
Note: GP = Games played; G = Goals; A = Assists; Pts = Points; PIM = Penalties in minutes

Player	GP	G	A	Pts	PIM
Phil Housley	72	26	44	70	47
Doug Bodger	61	7	40	47	52
Uwe Krupp	70	5	13	18	55
Lindy Ruff	63	6	11	17	86
Mike Ramsey	56	2	14	16	84
Calle Johansson	47	2	11	13	33
Shawn Anderson	33	2	10	12	18
Grant Ledyard	13	1	5	6	8
Joe Reekie	15	1	3	4	26
Larry Playfair	42	0	3	3	110
Richie Dunn	4	0	1	1	2
Bob Halkidis	16	0	1	1	66
Mark Ferner	2	0	0	0	2
Brad Miller	7	0	0	0	6
Steve Smith	3	0	0	0	0

=== Goaltending ===
Note: GP = Games played; W = Wins; L = Losses; T = Ties; SO = Shutouts; GAA = Goals against average

Player	GP	W	L	T	SO	GAA
Daren Puppa	37	17	10	6	1	3.36
Jacques Cloutier	36	15	14	0	0	3.63
Clint Malarchuk	7	3	1	1	1	2.39
Tom Barrasso	10	2	7	0	0	4.95
Darcy Wakaluk	6	1	3	0	0	4.21
Darren Eliot	2	0	0	0	0	6.27

== Draft picks ==
Buffalo's draft picks at the 1988 NHL entry draft held at the Montreal Forum in Montreal.

Round	#	Player	Nationality	College/Junior/Club team (League)
1	13	Joel Savage	Canada	Victoria Cougars (WHL)
3	55	Darcy Loewen	Canada	Spokane Chiefs (WHL)
4	76	Keith Carney	United States	Mount Saint Charles Academy (USHS-RI)
5	89	Alexander Mogilny	Soviet Union	CSKA Moscow (USSR)
5	97	Rob Ray	Canada	Cornwall Royals (OHL)
6	106	David DiVita	United States	Lake Superior State University (CCHA)
6	118	Mike McLaughlin	United States	Choate Rosemary Hall (USHS-CT)
7	139	Mike Griffith	Canada	Ottawa 67's (OHL)
8	160	Dan Ruoho	United States	James Madison Memorial High School (USHS-WI)
9	181	Wade Flaherty	Canada	Victoria Cougars (WHL)
11	223	Tom Nieman	United States	Choate Rosemary Hall (USHS-CT)
12	244	Bobby Wallwork	United States	Miami University (CCHA)
S	18	Clark Davies	United States	Ferris State University (CCHA)
