= 1988–89 Montreal Canadiens season =

NHL hockey team season

1988–89 Montreal Canadiens
- Wales Conference champions
- Adams Division champions
- Division: 1st Adams
- Conference: 1st Wales
- 1988–89 record: 53–18–9
- Home record: 30–6–4
- Road record: 23–12–5
- Goals for: 315
- Goals against: 218

Team information
- General manager: Serge Savard
- Coach: Pat Burns
- Captain: Bob Gainey
- Alternate captains: Mats Naslund; Larry Robinson
- Arena: Montreal Forum

Team leaders
- Goals: Mats Naslund (33)
- Assists: Chris Chelios (58)
- Points: Mats Naslund (84)
- Penalty minutes: Shayne Corson (193)
- Plus/minus: Guy Carbonneau (+37)
- Wins: Patrick Roy (33)
- Goals against average: Patrick Roy (2.47)

The 1988–89 Montreal Canadiens season was the club's 80th season of play. The Canadiens finished first in the Adams Division, as well as the Prince of Wales Conference, with a 53–18–9 record for 115 points. The team finished second overall in the league behind the Calgary Flames, who had 117 points. Montreal defeated the Hartford Whalers, Boston Bruins and Philadelphia Flyers in the playoffs before meeting the Flames in the Stanley Cup Final. Calgary took the series 4–2, clinching the Cup in game six on the Canadiens' vaunted home ice, the Montreal Forum. This marked the only time that a visiting team defeated them to win the Stanley Cup on Forum ice.

The Canadiens were coached by Pat Burns and captained by Bob Gainey.

== Regular season ==
- November 7, 1988 – The Canadiens traded RW John Kordic and a 6th-round choice (Michael Doers) to the Toronto Maple Leafs in exchange for RW Russ Courtnall.

For the third straight season, the Canadiens allowed the fewest goals in the NHL (218), were the least penalized team (326 short-handed situations) and allowed the fewest power-play goals (58).

=== Final standings ===
Adams Division
	GP	W	L	T	GF	GA	Pts
**Montreal Canadiens**	80	53	18	9	315	218	115
**Boston Bruins**	80	37	29	14	289	256	88
**Buffalo Sabres**	80	38	35	7	291	299	83
**Hartford Whalers**	80	37	38	5	299	290	79
Quebec Nordiques	80	27	46	7	269	342	61

Note: GP = Games played, W = Wins, L = Losses, T = Ties, Pts = Points, GF = Goals for, GA = Goals against
Note: Teams that qualified for the playoffs are highlighted in bold.

=== Record vs. opponents ===
==== Vs. Wales Conference ====
**Vs. Adams Division**

1988–89 NHL records
Team	**BOS**	**BUF**	**HFD**	**MTL**	**QUE**	**Total**
Boston	—	0–5–3	5–3	0–7–1	4–1–3	**9–16–7**
Buffalo	5–0–3	—	3–5	3–5	3–4–1	**14–13–5**
Hartford	3–5	5–3	—	1–7	4–3–1	**13–18–1**
Montreal	7–0–1	5–3	7–1	—	4–4	**23–8–1**
Quebec	1–4–3	4–3–1	3–4–1	4–4	—	**12–15–5**

**Vs. Patrick Division**

1988–89 NHL records
Team	**NJD**	**NYI**	**NYR**	**PHI**	**PIT**	**WSH**	**Total**
Boston	2–0–1	2–1	1–0–2	2–1	1–1–1	1–1–1	**9–4–5**
Buffalo	2–1	3–0	3–0	1–2	2–1	0–3	**11–7–0**
Hartford	2–1	2–1	2–1	1–1–1	2–1	0–3	**9–8–1**
Montreal	3–0	1–2	3–0	1–0–2	2–1	1–1–1	**11–4–3**
Quebec	2–1	1–2	1–2	1–2	2–1	0–2–1	**7–10–1**

==== Vs. Campbell Conference ====
**Vs. Norris Division**

1988–89 NHL records
Team	**CHI**	**DET**	**MIN**	**STL**	**TOR**	**Total**
Boston	3–0	0–2–1	0–2–1	3–0	3–0	**9–4–2**
Buffalo	2–1	3–0	0–1–2	1–2	2–1	**8–5–2**
Hartford	2–1	2–1	2–1	1–0–2	2–1	**9–4–2**
Montreal	1–0–2	1–2	1–0–2	2–0–1	2–1	**7–3–5**
Quebec	0–2–1	2–1	2–1	0–3	0–3	**4–10–1**

**Vs. Smythe Division**

1988–89 NHL records
Team	**CGY**	**EDM**	**LAK**	**VAN**	**WIN**	**Total**
Boston	1–2	3–0	2–1	2–1	2–1	**10–5–0**
Buffalo	2–1	0–2–1	0–3	1–2	2–1	**5–9–1**
Hartford	1–2	1–2	1–2	1–1–1	2–1	**6–8–1**
Montreal	2–1	2–1	3–0	3–0	2–1	**12–3–0**
Quebec	1–2	0–3	0–3	1–2	2–1	**4–11–0**

== Schedule and results ==
1988–89 regular season
October

Game	Result	Date	Score	Opponent	Record
1	L	October 6, 1988	2–3	@ Buffalo Sabres	0–1–0
2	W	October 8, 1988	4–3	Minnesota North Stars	1–1–0
3	L	October 12, 1988	5–6	Quebec Nordiques	1–2–0
4	W	October 14, 1988	7–3	@ New Jersey Devils	2–2–0
5	L	October 15, 1988	1–2	@ New York Islanders	2–3–0
6	L	October 17, 1988	2–6	Toronto Maple Leafs	2–4–0
7	W	October 19, 1988	5–4	Hartford Whalers	3–4–0
8	L	October 21, 1988	3–5	@ Buffalo Sabres	3–5–0
9	W	October 22, 1988	4–3	Buffalo Sabres	4–5–0
10	T	October 25, 1988	1–1 OT	@ Boston Bruins	4–5–1
11	L	October 26, 1988	2–4	@ Detroit Red Wings	4–6–1
12	L	October 29, 1988	4–5	Pittsburgh Penguins	4–7–1

November

Game	Result	Date	Score	Opponent	Record
13	W	November 1, 1988	5–3	@ Hartford Whalers	5–7–1
14	W	November 2, 1988	5–3	Los Angeles Kings	6–7–1
15	W	November 5, 1988	7–2	Winnipeg Jets	7–7–1
16	T	November 7, 1988	3–3 OT	St. Louis Blues	7–7–2
17	T	November 9, 1988	6–6 OT	@ Chicago Blackhawks	7–7–3
18	W	November 11, 1988	3–1	@ Vancouver Canucks	8–7–3
19	L	November 13, 1988	3–7	@ Winnipeg Jets	8–8–3
20	W	November 16, 1988	5–4 OT	New York Islanders	9–8–3
21	W	November 17, 1988	5–2	@ Boston Bruins	10–8–3
22	W	November 19, 1988	5–3	Chicago Blackhawks	11–8–3
23	W	November 21, 1988	4–2	@ New York Rangers	12–8–3
24	W	November 23, 1988	2–0	Boston Bruins	13–8–3
25	L	November 24, 1988	3–5	@ Quebec Nordiques	13–9–3
26	W	November 26, 1988	7–5	Edmonton Oilers	14–9–3
27	W	November 30, 1988	6–3	@ Hartford Whalers	15–9–3

December

Game	Result	Date	Score	Opponent	Record
28	T	December 1, 1988	2–2 OT	@ Philadelphia Flyers	15–9–4
29	W	December 3, 1988	3–2 OT	Buffalo Sabres	16–9–4
30	W	December 5, 1988	7–2	Detroit Red Wings	17–9–4
31	T	December 7, 1988	2–2 OT	@ Minnesota North Stars	17–9–5
32	W	December 8, 1988	5–1	@ St. Louis Blues	18–9–5
33	T	December 10, 1988	0–0 OT	Washington Capitals	18–9–6
34	W	December 12, 1988	3–1	Boston Bruins	19–9–6
35	L	December 15, 1988	4–6	@ Quebec Nordiques	19–10–6
36	W	December 17, 1988	6–3	New York Rangers	20–10–6
37	W	December 19, 1988	2–1	Hartford Whalers	21–10–6
38	W	December 21, 1988	6–4	Quebec Nordiques	22–10–6
39	W	December 22, 1988	4–2	@ Boston Bruins	23–10–6
40	W	December 27, 1988	3–2	@ Los Angeles Kings	24–10–6
41	W	December 29, 1988	4–3	@ Calgary Flames	25–10–6
42	W	December 31, 1988	4–2	@ Edmonton Oilers	26–10–6

January

Game	Result	Date	Score	Opponent	Record
43	W	January 1, 1989	4–0	@ Vancouver Canucks	27–10–6
44	W	January 7, 1989	3–1	Boston Bruins	28–10–6
45	L	January 9, 1989	2–3	@ Detroit Red Wings	28–11–6
46	W	January 11, 1989	1–0	New Jersey Devils	29–11–6
47	W	January 12, 1989	5–3	@ Boston Bruins	30–11–6
48	W	January 14, 1989	5–3	@ Toronto Maple Leafs	31–11–6
49	W	January 18, 1989	3–1	Hartford Whalers	32–11–6
50	L	January 19, 1989	4–6	@ Hartford Whalers	32–12–6
51	W	January 21, 1989	4–3	Toronto Maple Leafs	33–12–6
52	L	January 23, 1989	1–3	Calgary Flames	33–13–6
53	L	January 27, 1989	2–4	@ Buffalo Sabres	33–14–6
54	W	January 28, 1989	2–1	Buffalo Sabres	34–14–6
55	W	January 31, 1989	5–1	@ Pittsburgh Penguins	35–14–6

February

Game	Result	Date	Score	Opponent	Record
56	W	February 2, 1989	6–1	@ Quebec Nordiques	36–14–6
57	W	February 4, 1989	7–5	New York Rangers	37–14–6
58	W	February 11, 1989	5–4	New Jersey Devils	38–14–6
59	L	February 13, 1989	2–3	Quebec Nordiques	38–15–6
60	W	February 16, 1989	7–4	@ Philadelphia Flyers	39–15–6
61	W	February 18, 1989	4–2	@ St. Louis Blues	40–15–6
62	T	February 19, 1989	4–4 OT	@ Chicago Blackhawks	40–15–7
63	W	February 22, 1989	6–3	Winnipeg Jets	41–15–7
64	W	February 25, 1989	6–1	Buffalo Sabres	42–15–7
65	W	February 26, 1989	5–2	Vancouver Canucks	43–15–7

March

Game	Result	Date	Score	Opponent	Record
66	L	March 1, 1989	0–3	@ Edmonton Oilers	43–16–7
67	W	March 2, 1989	3–2	@ Calgary Flames	44–16–7
68	W	March 4, 1989	6–1	@ Hartford Whalers	45–16–7
69	W	March 8, 1989	3–2	Washington Capitals	46–16–7
70	W	March 9, 1989	5–2	@ Quebec Nordiques	47–16–7
71	W	March 11, 1989	5–3	Hartford Whalers	48–16–7
72	L	March 13, 1989	3–5	New York Islanders	48–17–7
73	W	March 15, 1989	5–2	Los Angeles Kings	49–17–7
74	L	March 17, 1989	1–4	@ Washington Capitals	49–18–7
75	W	March 18, 1989	7–2	@ Pittsburgh Penguins	50–18–7
76	W	March 22, 1989	8–0	Quebec Nordiques	51–18–7
77	T	March 25, 1989	1–1 OT	Minnesota North Stars	51–18–8
78	W	March 27, 1989	5–2	Boston Bruins	52–18–8
79	W	March 30, 1989	4–2	@ Buffalo Sabres	53–18–8

April

Game	Result	Date	Score	Opponent	Record
80	T	April 1, 1989	2–2 OT	Philadelphia Flyers	53–18–9

Legend: Win (2 points) Loss (0 points) Tie (1 point)

== Player statistics ==
=== Forwards ===
Note: GP = Games played; G = Goals; A = Assists; Pts = Points; PIM = Penalties in minutes

Player	GP	G	A	Pts	PIM
Mats Naslund	77	33	51	84	14
Bobby Smith	80	32	51	83	69
Stephane Richer	68	25	35	60	61
Guy Carbonneau	79	26	30	56	44
Claude Lemieux	69	29	22	51	136
Shayne Corson	80	26	24	50	193
Brian Skrudland	71	12	29	41	84
Mike McPhee	73	19	22	41	74
Russ Courtnall	64	22	17	39	15
Mike Keane	69	16	19	35	69
Ryan Walter	78	14	17	31	48
Brent Gilchrist	49	8	16	24	16
Bob Gainey	49	10	7	17	34
Gilles Thibaudeau	32	6	6	12	6
Jose Charbonneau	9	1	3	4	6
Benoit Brunet	2	0	1	1	0
Stephan Lebeau	1	0	1	1	2
Jocelyn Lemieux	1	0	1	1	0
Steve Martinson	25	1	0	1	87
John Kordic	6	0	0	0	13

=== Defencemen ===
Note: GP = Games played; G = Goals; A = Assists; Pts = Points; PIM = Penalties in minutes

Player	GP	G	A	Pts	PIM
Chris Chelios	80	15	58	73	185
Petr Svoboda	71	8	37	45	147
Larry Robinson	74	4	26	30	22
Craig Ludwig	74	3	13	16	73
Rick Green	72	1	14	15	25
Eric Desjardins	36	2	12	14	26
Mike Lalor	12	1	4	5	15
Jyrki Lumme	21	1	3	4	10
Donald Dufresne	13	0	1	1	43

=== Goaltending ===
Note: GP = Games played; W = Wins; L = Losses; T = Ties; SO = Shutouts; GAA = Goals against average

Player	GP	W	L	T	SO	GAA
Patrick Roy	48	33	5	6	4	2.47
Brian Hayward	36	20	13	3	1	2.90
Randy Exelby	1	0	0	0	0	0.00

== Playoffs ==
=== Adams Division semi-finals ===
==== Hartford Whalers vs. Montreal Canadiens ====
Date	Away	Score	Home	Score	Notes
April 5	Hartford Whalers	2	Montreal Canadiens	6	
April 6	Hartford Whalers	2	Montreal Canadiens	3	
April 8	Montreal Canadiens	5	Hartford Whalers	4	(OT)
April 9	Montreal Canadiens	4	Hartford Whalers	3	

Montreal wins best-of-seven series 4 games to 0.

=== Adams Division finals ===
==== Boston Bruins vs. Montreal Canadiens ====
Date	Away	Score	Home	Score	Notes
April 17	Boston Bruins	2	Montreal Canadiens	3	
April 19	Boston Bruins	2	Montreal Canadiens	3	(OT)
April 21	Montreal Canadiens	5	Boston Bruins	4	
April 23	Montreal Canadiens	2	Boston Bruins	3	
April 25	Boston Bruins	2	Montreal Canadiens	3	

Montreal wins best-of-seven series 4 games to 1.

=== Conference finals ===
==== Philadelphia Flyers vs. Montreal Canadiens ====
Date	Away	Score	Home	Score	Notes
May 1	Philadelphia Flyers	3	Montreal Canadiens	1	
May 3	Philadelphia Flyers	0	Montreal Canadiens	3	
May 5	Montreal Canadiens	5	Philadelphia Flyers	1	
May 7	Montreal Canadiens	3	Philadelphia Flyers	0	
May 9	Philadelphia Flyers	2	Montreal Canadiens	1	(OT)
May 11	Montreal Canadiens	4	Philadelphia Flyers	2	

Montreal wins best-of-seven series 4 games to 2.

=== Stanley Cup Final ===
==== Montreal Canadiens vs. Calgary Flames ====
The Stanley Cup Final was decided between the top two teams during the 1988–89 NHL regular season. Co-captain Lanny McDonald scored the second Flames goal in Game 6. This turned out to be the last goal in his Hockey Hall of Fame career because he retired during the following off-season. Doug Gilmour scored two goals in the third period, including the eventual game and Cup winner to cement the victory for the Flames.

Date	Away	Score	Home	Score	Notes
May 14	Montreal	2	Calgary	3	
May 17	Montreal	4	Calgary	2	
May 19	Calgary	3	Montreal	4	(2nd OT)
May 21	Calgary	4	Montreal	2	
May 23	Montreal	2	Calgary	3	
May 25	Calgary	4	Montreal	2	

Calgary wins best-of-seven series 4 games to 2.

== Awards and records ==
- Prince of Wales Trophy
- Frank J. Selke Trophy: Guy Carbonneau
- Jack Adams Award: Pat Burns
- James Norris Memorial Trophy: Chris Chelios
- William M. Jennings Trophy: Patrick Roy/Brian Hayward
- Vezina Trophy: Patrick Roy
- Patrick Roy, goalie, NHL First All-Star Team
- Chris Chelios, defence, NHL First All-Star Team

== Draft picks ==
Round	Pick	Player	Nationality	College/junior/club team
1	20	Eric Charron (D)	Canada	Trois-Rivières Draveurs (QMJHL)
2	34	Martin St. Amour (LW)	Canada	Verdun Junior Canadiens (QMJHL)
3	46	Neil Carnes (C)	Canada	Verdun Junior Canadiens (QMJHL)
4	83	Patric Kjellberg (LW)	Sweden	Falu IF (Sweden)
5	93	Peter Popovic (D)	Sweden	Västerås HK (Sweden)
5	104	Jean-Claude Bergeron (G)	Canada	Verdun Junior Canadiens (QMJHL)
6	125	Patrik Carnback (RW)	Sweden	Västra Frölunda HC (Sweden)
7	146	Tim Chase (D)	United States	Tabor Academy (USHS-MA)
8	167	Sean Hill (D)	United States	East High School (USHS-MN)
9	188	Harijs Vitolinsh (C)	Soviet Union	Dinamo Riga (USSR)
10	209	Yuri Krivokhizha (D)	Soviet Union	Dinamo Minsk (USSR)
11	230	Kevin Dahl (D)	Canada	Bowling Green State University (CCHA)
12	251	Dave Kunda (D)	Canada	University of Guelph (CIAU)
S	25	Peter Fish (G)	United States	Boston University (Hockey East)

== See also ==
- 1988–89 NHL season
