= NHL on television in the 1970s =

From 1965 through 1975, in addition to the Saturday night game on CBC, Hockey Night in Canada also produced and broadcast a Wednesday night game on CTV, CBC's privately owned competitor; beginning in the 1975–76 NHL season, these midweek games began to broadcast by local stations. In 1970–71, the Vancouver Canucks joined the NHL, meaning that there were now three possible venues for an HNIC telecast.

In the U.S., the league's deal with CBS to air Sunday afternoon regular-season games and playoff games expired at the end of the 1971–72 season. NBC then aired those games in the same slot from 1972–73 to 1974–75. After failing to find a national network to replace NBC, the league launched the NHL Network, a syndication package that offered games to independent stations from 1975–76 to 1978–79. In 1979–80, the USA Network (known at the time UA-Columbia) then signed on to televise games, while ESPN made deals with a selected number of individual teams to air their games.

== Year-by-year breakdown ==
=== 1970 ===
For six seasons, from 1966–67 through 1971–72, CBS aired a game each week between mid-January until early-mid May in each of those seasons, mainly on a Sunday afternoon, including playoffs. Each American based franchise was paid US$100,000 annually for the first two years of the initial contract and $150,000 for the third. From 1968–69 through 1971–72, the intermission studio was called "CBS Control," just like with its NFL coverage.

In 1970, Pat Summerall and then Boston Bruins' television announcer Don Earle did a short post-game segment from inside the team's dressing room at the end of CBS' coverage of the fourth (and what turned out to be the final game) of the 1970 Stanley Cup Final. WSBK-TV, which was the Bruins' television flagship at the time, simulcast the CBS coverage and did a longer post-game locker-room segment after CBS' coverage ended. After Bobby Orr scored the championship-winning goal after just 40 seconds, so the story went, Summerall turned to Bobby's father, Doug Orr (who was reportedly, too nervous to go back to his seat from the Bruins' dressing room for the start of overtime) and yelled over the crowd in the stands above "Mr. Orr, your son has scored, and Boston has won the Stanley Cup!" Doug Orr is said to have told Summerall, "I know Boston scored, but we didn't see it! What makes you think my son scored?" Summerall supposedly replied, "Because they wouldn't be yelling this loudly if Esposito had scored!"

The most commonly seen video clip of Bobby Orr's "flight" is the American version broadcast on CBS as called by Dan Kelly. This archival clip can be considered a rarity, since about 98% of the time, any surviving kinescopes or videotapes of the actual telecasts of hockey games from this era usually emanate from CBC's coverage. According to Dick Irvin, Jr.'s book My 26 Stanley Cups (Irvin was in the CBC booth with Danny Gallivan during the 1970 Stanley Cup Final), he was always curious why even the CBC typically uses the CBS replay of the Bobby Orr goal (with Dan Kelly's commentary) instead of Gallivan's call. The explanation that Irvin received was that the CBC's master tape of the game (along with others) was thrown away in order to clear shelf space at the network.

The clip exists because WSBK-TV in Boston, then an independent station, was the television flagship of the Boston Bruins. WSBK had a weekly program during the season showing highlights of the previous week's games. WSBK got permission from CBS to simulcast the game and to tape the network's telecast and use highlights from that it for the next week's show. WSBK decided to show the entire (however brief) overtime session in the final 1969–70 edition (aired on May 17, 1970) of Bruins Highlights, as well as in Boston Bruins: World Champions, an hour-long documentary featuring highlights of the team's 1969–70 season and Stanley Cup win. Coincidentally, WSBK is now owned by CBS, run as a sister station to WBZ-TV (formerly owned by Westinghouse Broadcasting as an NBC affiliate).

=== 1971 ===
On January 31, 1971, CBS was scheduled to carry a game between the Boston Bruins and St. Louis Blues, a rematch of the 1970 Final. The game was to begin at 2 p.m. Eastern Time, but NASA announced that the Apollo 14 lunar-landing mission would be launched that afternoon at 3:23 p.m. Eastern Time. CBS decided to air the first period of the game live, then switch to news coverage once the first period ended (at approximately 2:30 p.m. Eastern Time). At about 4:30 p.m. Eastern Time, after the launch coverage was due to end, CBS would show the second and third periods of the game on tape delay. But the launch was delayed for over a half-hour, and after the launch took place, CBS had no time to show the rest of the game on tape.

Sunday afternoon playoff games were shown by the network; the same pattern continued through the 1971–72 season. CBS did manage to televise the 1971 Stanley Cup Final clincher on a Tuesday night and the 1972 Stanley Cup Final clincher on a Thursday night. In 1971, CBS was not scheduled to broadcast Game 7 of the Stanley Cup Final, but showed the prime time contest (the first ever occurrence of an NHL game being nationally televised in prime time in the United States) between the Montreal Canadiens and Chicago Black Hawks after fans reportedly swamped switchboards at network headquarters in New York City asking that the seventh game be televised. Ironically, the game was not telecast by CBS' Chicago owned-and-operated station WBBM-TV, nor on CBS affiliates in most of Illinois, and parts of Indiana, Wisconsin and Iowa, due to Blackhawks' owner Arthur M. Wirtz policy of not telecasting home games. While Dan Kelly once again handled all the play-by-play work, Jim Gordon replaced Bill Mazer in 1970–71. For the CBS' Stanley Cup Final coverage during this period, a third voice was added to the booth (Phil Esposito in 1971 and Harry Howell in 1972).

=== 1972 ===
One trivial note however, on January 23, 1972, Jim Gordon was not in Boston for the Buffalo–Boston game. Therefore, Dick Stockton filled-in and did the game with Dan Kelly. Stockton, although doing some work for The NFL on CBS, was also at the time a sports anchor for WBZ-TV in Boston, which ironically was at the time an NBC affiliate (WBZ-TV switched from NBC to CBS on January 2, 1995, after its parent company Westinghouse invested in and later purchased CBS, making WBZ an owned-and-operated station of the network in September 1995 which it has remained as since).

In 1972, Hockey Night in Canada moved all playoff coverage from CBC to CTV to avoid conflict with the lengthy NABET strike against the CBC. Eventually, MacLaren Advertising, in conjunction with Molson Breweries and Imperial Oil/Esso, who actually owned the rights to Hockey Night in Canada (not CBC) decided to give the playoff telecast rights to CTV. Initially, it was on a game by game basis in the quarterfinals (Game 1 of the Boston–Toronto series was seen on CFTO Toronto in full while other CTV affiliates, but not all joined the game in progress. Game 1 of the New York Rangers–Montreal series was seen only on CFCF Montreal while Game 4 not televised due to a lockout of technicians at the Montreal Forum), and then the full semifinals and Stanley Cup Final. Because CTV did not have 100% penetration in Canada at this time, they asked CBC (who ultimately refused) to allow whatever one of their affiliates were the sole network in that market to show the playoffs. As a result, the 1972 Stanley Cup playoffs were not seen in some of the smaller Canadian markets unless said markets were close enough to the United States border to pick up the signal of a CBS affiliate that carried Games, 1, 4, or 6 (Games 2, 3 and 5 were not nationally broadcast in the United States).

During the 1972 Stanley Cup Final between the Boston Bruins and New York Rangers, CBS took a rather calculated risk in not televising the Game 5 match on May 9 (CBS aired regular programming, including the original Hawaii Five-O in that time period on that Tuesday night). This was despite the fact that Game 5 was a potential clincher with the Bruins up three games to one on the Rangers. CBS ultimately lucked out (since the Rangers won Game 5 3–2), and televised the clincher (Game 6) on Thursday night, May 11.

After CBS lost the American television rights to NBC following the 1971–72 season (CBS was paying less than $2 million a year and NBC jumped to $5.3 million), the network covered the inaugural season of the World Hockey Association.

HBO's first sports broadcast was of a New York Rangers–Vancouver Canucks NHL game from Madison Square Garden, transmitted to a Service Electric cable system in Wilkes-Barre, Pennsylvania on November 8, 1972; the channel continued to air NHL hockey games through the mid-1970s. More specifically, was transmitted over channel 21—its original assigned channel on the Teleservice system—that evening to 325 Teleservice subscribers in Wilkes-Barre (a plaque commemorating this event is located at Public Square in downtown Wilkes-Barre).

=== 1973 and 1974 ===
From 1972–73–1974–75, NBC not only televised the Stanley Cup Final (including a couple of games in prime time), but also weekly regular season games on Sunday afternoons. The previous contract with CBS was paying the NHL less than $2 million a year and NBC jumped in with an offer of $5.3 million. NBC also aired one regular season and a couple of playoff games in prime time during the first couple of seasons. Tim Ryan and Ted Lindsay (with Brian McFarlane as the intermission host) served as the commentators for NBC's NHL coverage during this period. Since most NHL teams still did not have players' names displayed on the backs of jerseys, NBC persuaded NHL commissioner Clarence Campbell to make teams put on players' names on NBC telecasts beginning with the 1973–74 season to help viewers identify them.

Peter Puck was introduced during NBC's NHL coverage in the 1970s. The animated character, whose cartoon adventures (produced by Hanna-Barbera) appeared on both NBC's Hockey Game of the Week and CBC's Hockey Night in Canada, explained hockey rules to the home viewing audience.

Besides Peter Puck, the 1970s version of The NHL on NBC had a between-periods feature titled Showdown. The concept of Showdown involved 20 of the NHL's greatest players (16 shooters and four goaltenders) going head-to-head in a taped penalty shot competition with Brian McFarlane hosting. After the NHL left NBC in 1975, Showdown continued to be seen on Hockey Night in Canada and local television broadcasts of U.S.-based NHL teams.

=== 1975 ===
When Game 7 of the 1975 playoff series between Pittsburgh and the New York Islanders took place, Bill Hewitt's Toronto Maple Leafs were already eliminated, the team of Danny Gallivan and Dick Irvin Jr. were prepping for the Montreal–Buffalo series, and Brian McFarlane was assisting NBC for their Game 1 coverage of the aforementioned Montreal-Buffalo series the next day (April 26).

Starting in the 1978 playoffs, the NHL Network began simulcasting many games with Hockey Night in Canada. In these games, Dan Kelly, who was the NHL Network's lead play-by-play announcer, was assigned to do play-by-play along with HNIC color commentators. This for example, happened in Game 7 of the quarterfinal series between the Toronto Maple Leafs and New York Islanders (April 29), where Kelly teamed up with Brian McFarlane. The entire 1978 Stanley Cup Final between the Montreal Canadiens and Boston Bruins and the entire 1979 Stanley Cup Final between the Montreal Canadiens and New York Rangers were both simulcasted as well.

NBC did not broadcast the sixth game of the 1975 Final, in which the Philadelphia Flyers defeated the Buffalo Sabres to clinch their second consecutive championship, played in prime time on a Tuesday night. Had the Final gone to a seventh game, NBC would have pre-empted its prime time lineup on a Thursday night to carry that deciding contest. But by that time, the network had informed the NHL that unless ratings for the Final spiked, it would drop the sport, which it did at the end of the season.

=== 1976 ===
After being dropped by NBC after the 1974–75 season, the NHL had no national television contract in the United States. In response to this, the league put together a network of independent stations covering approximately 55% of the country.

Games typically aired on Monday nights (beginning at 8 p.m. ET) or Saturday afternoons. The package was offered to local stations with no rights fee. Profits would be derived from the advertising, which was about evenly split between the network and the local station. The Monday night games were often billed as The NHL Game of the Week. Viewers in New York City, Buffalo, St. Louis, Pittsburgh, Detroit and Los Angeles got the Game of the Week on a different channel than their local team's games. Therefore, whenever a team had a “home” game, the NHL Network aired the home team's broadcast rather than their own.

Initially, the Monday night package was marketed to ABC affiliates; the idea being that ABC carried Monday-night NFL football in the fall and (starting in May 1976) Monday-night Major League Baseball in the spring and summer, stations would want hockey to create a year-round Monday night sports block. But very few ABC stations picked up the package.

In most U.S. NHL cities, the Hughes NHL affiliate was the same one that aired the local team's games. About a couple of dozen other stations carried the games. The network had 47 stations for the 1976–77 season.

By the time that NBC’s contract with the NHL ended after the 1974–75, they were getting a 3.8 rating. Meanwhile, the ratings for the NHL Network in its first month of existence were a 3.1 in New York, 1.9 in Los Angeles, and a 1.3 in Chicago. By 1978–79, the Monday night games were seen by about 1 million viewers; 300,000 of which were in the Boston area. Also in 1978–79, the 2 p.m. ET version of the Saturday broadcasts (with the first period cut out) was picked up by all participating affiliates except WSBK-TV Boston (which carried the entire game), and often, the cities whose local teams were playing if the local station aired the NHL Network version of a game instead of a locally produced broadcast.

During the 1975–76 season, the NHL Network showed selected games from the NHL Super Series (the big one in that package was Red Army at Philadelphia, but the package didn't include Red Army at Montreal on New Year's Eve 1975, which was seen only on CBC) as well as some playoff games. During the 1976–77 season, the NHL Network showed 12 regular season games on Monday nights plus the All-Star Game. By 1978–79 (the final season of the NHL Network's existence), there would be 18 Monday night games and 12 Saturday afternoon games covered.

On January 4, 1976, CBS decided to televise the Soviet Wings/Buffalo Sabres Super Series game nationally. They likely didn't expect anybody to watch as the game went head to head with the AFC Championship Game on NBC. The game also had to be over by 3:30 p.m. EST so that CBS could be ready to broadcast the pregame for the NFC Championship Game. So to save two minutes, they cut "O Canada" much to the dismay of those attending at Buffalo Memorial Auditorium. The game did extend past 3:30 p.m. Eastern time, so CBS ended the telecast seconds after the final buzzer went off, allowing the network to air as much of an abbreviated NFL Today pregame show prior to the NFC Championship game as possible.

CBC announced prior to the preliminary round of the 1976 playoffs that they would not televise any games from the opening round. As a result of this, the rights were sold back to the individual Canadian teams. Since Montreal received a bye into the quarterfinals, this impacted Toronto and Vancouver's television coverage. While CHCH and CITY both televised all three games of the Toronto-Pittsburgh series (with Bill Hewitt and Brian McFarlane on the call), CHAN picked up the Vancouver-New York Islanders series. Game 1 of the Philadelphia-Toronto series was televised locally to Southern Ontario by CHCH. Game 1 of the Philadelphia-Toronto playoff series was televised locally to Southern Ontario by CHCH.

For Game 4 of the 1976 quarterfinal playoff series between the Montreal Canadiens and Chicago Black Hawks (April 16), Marv Albert and Brad Palmer called the game. Albert handled play-by-play for the first and third period while Palmer, the Black Hawks' TV host, handled play-by-play for the second period. They in the process, acted as analysts for each other. Played at Chicago Stadium, the game was blacked out in the Chicago area.

Meanwhile, Marv Albert also during the 1976 playoffs, teamed with Tim Ryan (who split play-by-play duties with Albert) and George Michael for Game 1 of the New York Islanders–Buffalo Sabres series (April 11) and Terry Crisp for Game 7 of the Toronto Maple Leafs–Philadelphia Flyers series (April 25). Terry Crisp also worked alongside play-by-play men Gene Hart and Don Earle on Game 4 of the aforementioned Toronto-Philadelphia series (April 17).

The 1976 Stanley Cup Final on the NHL Network marked the first time that the NHL's championship series was nationally televised in its entirety in the United States. The analysts for the 1976 Stanley Cup Final were active players and each game featured a different analyst alongside Marv Albert. These players were Stan Mikita, Garry Unger, Chico Resch and Curt Bennett. This format continued in 1977 with Stan Mikita, Garry Unger, Chico Resch, Don Awrey replacing Curt Bennett, who instead worked with Marv Albert and Dan Kelly on Game 4 of the Philadelphia Flyers–Boston Bruins playoff series (May 1).

=== 1977 ===
Game 1 of the 1977 Pittsburgh–Toronto playoff series was seen regionally in Southern Ontario on CHCH-Hamilton.

=== 1978 ===
Starting in the 1978 playoffs, the NHL Network began simulcasting many games with Hockey Night in Canada. In these games, Dan Kelly, who was the NHL Network's lead play-by-play announcer, was assigned to do play-by-play along with HNIC color commentators. This for example, happened in Game 7 of the quarterfinal series between the Toronto Maple Leafs and New York Islanders (April 29), where Kelly teamed up with Brian McFarlane. The entire 1979 Stanley Cup Final between the Montreal Canadiens and New York Rangers was simulcast as well. However, had that final gone to Game 7, then that game would have been broadcast on ABC.

=== 1979 ===
1979–80's Challenge Cup replaced the All-Star Game. It was a best of three series between the NHL All-Stars against the Soviet Union national squad. In the United States, Game 2, which was held on a Saturday afternoon, was shown on CBS as part of CBS Sports Spectacular. The network refused to expand CBS Sports Spectacular to carry the game in full so instead, the show came on during the second intermission, showed taped highlights of the first two periods, and then showed the final period live. The lead-in to Sports Spectacular was The World's Strongest Man. The then-CBS affiliate in Boston, the old WNAC-TV, broadcast a local college hockey game that led into Sports Spectacular.

The network, the show and their sponsors had a problem with the rink board advertising that the NHL sold at Madison Square Garden, and refused to allow them to be shown on television. As a result, CBS viewers were unable to see the far boards above the yellow kickplate, and could only see players' skates when the play moved to that side of the ice. Games 1 and 3 were shown on the NHL Network, where the advertising was no problem.

In 1979, ABC was contracted to televise Game 7 of the Stanley Cup Final. Since the Final ended in five games, the contract was void.

It was also around this time that ABC offered the NHL a limited deal that NHL president John Ziegler quickly rejected. ABC wanted to split the network and show the NHL in the Northeast and Midwest and NASCAR in the South on Sunday afternoons.

== See also ==
- List of Hockey Night in Canada commentating crews (1970s)
