= History of the National Hockey League on television =

The National Hockey League (NHL) is shown on national television in the United States and Canada. With 25 teams in the U.S. and seven in Canada, the NHL is the only one of the four major professional sports leagues in the United States and Canada that maintains separate national broadcasters in each country, each producing separate telecasts of a slate of regular season games, playoff games, and the Stanley Cup Final.

With the prominence of Hockey Night in Canada since the 1950s, and with Canadian teams like the Edmonton Oilers and the Montreal Canadiens making multiple championship runs during the 1970s and 1980s, the Stanley Cup Final has regularly been produced and aired on broadcast television in Canada for decades. Meanwhile, American national coverage of the NHL evolved much slower than those of the other three leagues, and long-term coverage of the Stanley Cup Final remains on American cable television in some form with Turner Sports agreeing to air the series on TNT in 2023, 2025, and 2027.

== Historical breakdown ==
=== First broadcast ===
As part of a series of experimental broadcasts that W2XBS (now NBC's flagship station, WNBC) produced between 1939 and 1940, the station broadcast a game between the New York Rangers and Montreal Canadiens from Madison Square Garden on February 25, 1940. Bill Allen provided the commentary. About 300 people in the New York City area saw the Rangers win, 6–2. Over the next few years, W2XBS (later WNBT) carried some New York Rangers home games on a local basis. A few New York Americans and Rangers games were on experimental TV stations in 1940-41 and 1941-42; then TV closed down until 1945-46.

=== Debut of Hockey Night in Canada ===
In the fall of 1951, in an attempt to determine whether it was a suitable medium for broadcasting hockey games, Conn Smythe watched special television feeds of Maple Leaf games. Television already had detractors within the NHL, especially Campbell who declared it "the greatest menace of the entertainment world". In 1952, even though only 10% of Canadians owned a television set, the Canadian Broadcasting Corporation (CBC) began televising games. On November 1, 1952, Hockey Night in Canada was first broadcast on television, with Foster Hewitt calling the action between the Leafs and Bruins at Maple Leaf Gardens. The broadcasts quickly became the highest-rated show on Canadian television. The broadcast came three weeks after Montreal radio host René Lecavalier presented a French-language telecast of the Montreal Canadiens' opener against Chicago, marking the beginning of La Soirée du hockey, which Radio-Canada, the French arm of the CBC, broadcast until 2004.

=== 1950s ===
In the 1952–53 season, CBC began televising Hockey Night in Canada as a simulcast to the radio calls, joining the games in progress either 30 minutes or 60 minutes after the opening faceoff. Until 1961, the CBC was the only operating television network in Canada. Not only that, it was likely that not all Toronto Maple Leafs and Montreal Canadiens playoff games were televised in the early years, including to their local markets.

CBS first broadcast Saturday afternoon National Hockey League games for four seasons from 1956–57 to 1959–60. Bud Palmer serving as the play-by-play announcer and Fred Cusick provided color commentary, pregame, and intermission interviews for the first three seasons. In 1959–60, Cusick moved over to play-by-play while Brian McFarlane came in to do the color commentary, pregame, and intermission interviews. The pregame and intermission interviews were done on the ice, with the interviewer on skates. No playoff games were televised during this period, and all broadcasts took place in one of the four American arenas at the time.

CBS covered the 1956–57 season on Saturday afternoons, starting on January 5. For the next three years, CBS continued airing games on Saturday afternoons starting on November 2, 1957, October 18, 1958, and January 9, 1960.

=== 1960s ===
CTV's involvement with the NHL began in the 1965–66 season with a series of Wednesday-night regular season games. These were produced by the McLaren ad agency, which also produced the Saturday night Hockey Night in Canada games for the CBC. As was the case with the Saturday games, they were contests (usually at home) of the Montreal Canadiens, Toronto Maple Leafs, and after 1970, the Vancouver Canucks. CTV decided to pull out of midweek NHL coverage in 1975, opening the way for local TV stations in the three Canadian cities which had NHL clubs to carry mid-week telecasts of their hometown NHL clubs (also usually on Wednesday nights).

The regional issues that caused the NHL's previous American television deal with CBS to be terminated were settled by the league's pending addition of six new teams, which expanded the league's reach nationwide and into lucrative markets in Pennsylvania and California (in addition to two other midwestern markets; NBC, however, would lose the broadcast rights before the six new teams would make it to play). In 1966, NBC became the first television network in the United States to air a national broadcast of a Stanley Cup Playoff game, providing coverage of four Sunday afternoon playoff games during the 1965–66 postseason in color. On April 10 and April 17, NBC aired semi-final games between the Chicago Black Hawks and the Detroit Red Wings. On April 24 and May 1, NBC aired games one and four of the Stanley Cup Final between the Montreal Canadiens and Detroit Red Wings. Win Elliot served as the play-by-play man while Bill Mazer served as the color commentator for the games. Most notably, the CBC followed suit the next year. NBC's Stanley Cup coverage preempted a sports anthology series called NBC Sports in Action, hosted by Jim Simpson and Bill Cullen, who were between-periods co-hosts for the Stanley Cup broadcasts. To accommodate NBC coverage, game one of the 1966 Stanley Cup Final was shifted to a Sunday afternoon, marking the first time ever that a National Hockey League game was played on a Sunday afternoon in Montreal.

In the United States, the clinching game of the 1966 Stanley Cup Final on the evening of Thursday, May 5 aired on RKO General's stations, such as WOR-TV in New York City and WHCT in Hartford, Connecticut. Bob Wolff, who at the time did play-by-play for New York Rangers games seen on WOR, and Emile Francis provided commentary for RKO's coverage that night.

For six seasons, from 1966–67 through 1971–72, CBS aired a game each week between mid-January until early-mid May in each of those seasons, mainly on a Sunday afternoon, including playoffs. Each American based franchise was paid US$100,000 annually for the first two years of the initial contract and $150,000 for the third. From 1968 to 1969 through 1971–72, the intermission studio was called "CBS Control," just like with its NFL coverage.

Due to prior programming commitments, CBS could not broadcast regular season games during the 1966–67 season, so that portion of the package was subleased to RKO General, which syndicated eight regular-season games to some cities, including the four U.S. cities that then had NHL clubs and the six U.S. cities that would gain new teams in the 1967 expansion. RKO General aired series of Sunday afternoon broadcasts at 4 p.m. Eastern Time during the last eight weeks of the regular season, starting on February 12, 1967. However, regular-season games were blacked out in the cities where they were played. For example, the March 26, 1967, game between the Boston Bruins and Montreal Canadiens in Boston was not televised on any station in the Boston area.

=== 1970s ===
In 1972, Hockey Night in Canada moved all playoff coverage from CBC to CTV to avoid conflict with the lengthy NABET strike against the CBC. Eventually, MacLaren Advertising, in conjunction with Molson Breweries and Imperial Oil/Esso, who actually owned the rights to Hockey Night in Canada (not CBC) decided to give the playoff telecast rights to CTV. Initially, it was on a game by game basis in the quarterfinals (game one of the Boston-Toronto series was seen on CFTO Toronto in full while other, but not all joined the game in progress. Game one of the New York Rangers-Montreal series was seen only on CFCF Montreal while game four not televised due to a lockout of technicians at the Montreal Forum), and then the full semi-finals and Stanley Cup Final. Because CTV did not have 100% penetration in Canada at this time, they asked CBC (who ultimately refused) to allow whatever one of their affiliates were the sole network in that market to show the playoffs. As a result, the 1972 Stanley Cup playoffs were not seen in some of the smaller Canadian markets unless said markets were close enough to the United States border to pick up the signal of a CBS affiliate that carried games one, four, or six (games two, three and five were not nationally broadcast in the United States).

After CBS lost the American television rights to NBC following the 1971–72 season (CBS was paying less than $2 million a year and NBC jumped to $5.3 million), the network covered the inaugural season of the World Hockey Association.

From 1972–73–1974–75, NBC not only televised the Stanley Cup Finals (including a couple of games in prime time), but also weekly regular season games on Sunday afternoons (including select one regular season Friday night game in primetime). The previous contract with CBS was paying the NHL less than $2 million a year, and NBC jumped in with an offer of $5.3 million. Tim Ryan and Ted Lindsay (with Brian McFarlane as the intermission host) served as the commentators for NBC's NHL coverage during this period. Since most NHL teams still did not have players' names displayed on the backs of jerseys, NBC persuaded NHL commissioner Clarence Campbell to make teams put on players' names on NBC telecasts beginning with the 1973–74 season to help viewers identify them.

Peter Puck was introduced during NBC's NHL coverage in the 1970s. The animated character, whose cartoon adventures (produced by Hanna-Barbera) appeared on both NBC's Hockey Game of the Week and CBC's Hockey Night in Canada, explained hockey rules to the home viewing audience.

Besides Peter Puck, the 1970s version of The NHL on NBC had a between-periods feature titled Showdown. The concept of Showdown involved 20 of the NHL's greatest players (16 shooters and four goaltenders) going head-to-head in a taped penalty shot competition with Brian McFarlane hosting. After the NHL left NBC in 1975, Showdown continued to be seen on Hockey Night in Canada and local television broadcasts of U.S.-based NHL teams.

After being dropped by NBC after the 1974–75 season, the NHL had no national television contract in the United States. In response to this, the league put together a network of independent stations covering approximately 55% of the country.

Games typically aired on Monday nights (beginning at 8 p.m. ET) or Saturday afternoons. The package was offered to local stations with no rights fee. Profits would be derived from the advertising, which was about evenly split between the network and the local station. The Monday night games were often billed as The NHL Game of the Week. Viewers in New York City, Buffalo, St. Louis, Pittsburgh, Detroit and Los Angeles got the Game of the Week on a different channel than their local team's games. Therefore, whenever a team had a "home" game, the NHL Network aired the home team's broadcast rather than their own.

Initially, the Monday night package was marketed to ABC affiliates; the idea being that ABC carried Monday-night NFL football in the fall and (starting in May 1976) Monday-night Major League Baseball in the spring and summer, stations would want hockey to create a year-round Monday night sports block. But very few ABC stations picked up the package.

In most U.S. NHL cities, the Hughes NHL affiliate was the same one that aired the local team's games. About a couple of dozen other stations carried the games. The network had 47 stations for the 1976–77 season.

By the time that NBC's contract with the NHL ended after the 1974–75, they were getting a 3.8 rating. Meanwhile, the ratings for the NHL Network in its first month of existence were a 3.1 in New York, 1.9 in Los Angeles, and a 1.3 in Chicago. By 1978–79, the Monday night games were seen by about 1 million viewers; 300,000 of which were in the Boston area. Also in 1978–79, the 2 pm. ET version of the Saturday broadcasts (with the first period cut out) was picked up by all participating affiliates except WSBK-TV Boston (which carried the entire game), and often, the cities whose local teams were playing if the local station aired the NHL Network game version not locally produced broadcast.

During the 1975–76 season, the NHL Network showed selected games from the NHL Super Series (the big one in that package was Red Army at Philadelphia, but the package didn't include Red Army at Montreal on New Year's Eve 1975, which was seen only on CBC) as well as some playoff games. During the 1976–77 season, the NHL Network showed 12 regular season games on Monday nights plus the All-Star Game. By 1978–79 (the final season of the NHL Network's existence), there would be 18 Monday night games and 12 Saturday afternoon games covered.

Starting in the 1978 playoffs, the NHL Network began simulcasting many games with Hockey Night in Canada. In these games, Dan Kelly, who was the NHL Network's lead play-by-play announcer, was assigned to do play-by-play along with HNIC color commentators. This for example, happened in game seven of the quarterfinal series between the Toronto Maple Leafs and New York Islanders (April 29), where Kelly teamed up with Brian McFarlane. The entire 1978 Stanley Cup Final between the Montreal Canadiens and Boston Bruins and the entire 1979 Stanley Cup Final between the Montreal Canadiens and New York Rangers were both simulcasted as well.

1979–80's Challenge Cup replaced the All-Star Game. It was a best of three series between the NHL All-Stars against the Soviet Union national squad. In the United States, Game 2, which was held on a Saturday afternoon, was shown on CBS as part of CBS Sports Spectacular, which was not expanded to carry the entire game so instead, the show came on during the second intermission, showed taped highlights of the first two periods, and then showed the final period live. The lead-in to Sports Spectacular was The World's Strongest Man. The then-CBS affiliate in Boston, the old WNAC-TV, broadcast a local college hockey game that led into Sports Spectacular.

The network, the show and their sponsors had a problem with the rink board advertising that the NHL sold at Madison Square Garden, and refused to allow them to be shown on television. As a result, CBS viewers were unable to see the far boards above the yellow kickplate, and could only see players' skates when the play moved to that side of the ice. Games one and three were shown on the NHL Network, where the advertising was no problem.

In 1979, ABC was contracted to televise game seven of the Stanley Cup Final. Since the Finals ended in five games, the contract was void.

It was also around this time that ABC offered the NHL a limited deal that NHL president John Ziegler quickly rejected. ABC wanted to split the network and show the NHL in the Northeast and Midwest and NASCAR in the South on Sunday afternoons.

=== 1980s ===
In 1979–80, the National Hockey League replaced their syndicated coverage package The NHL Network with a package on USA. At the time, the USA Network was called UA-Columbia. As the immediate forerunner for the USA Network, UA-Columbia, served as the cable syndicated arm of not only MSG Network in New York City, but also PRISM channel in Philadelphia, and whatever pay/cable outlets were around in 1979.

USA's coverage began as a Monday night series with Dan Kelly doing play-by-play alongside a variety of commentators including Pete Stemkowski, Lou Nanne, and Brian McFarlane. Scott Wahle was the intermission host.

ESPN initially covered the NHL during the 1979–80, 1980–81 and 1981–82 seasons by making deals with individual teams. This included eleven Hartford Whalers home broadcasts in 1980–81 and 25 the following year. During this time, USA also broadcast National Hockey League games. To prevent overexposure, the NHL decided to grant only one network exclusive rights. In April 1982, USA outbid ESPN for the NHL's American national television cable package ($8 million for two years).

The independent Hughes Television Network broadcast National Hockey League games aired under the title The NHL '80. Hughes broadcast Thursday night games, the All-Star Game, some playoff games, and Games 1–5 of the Stanley Cup Final. Hughes technically, used Hockey Night in Canada feeds for the American coverage of the first five games of the Stanley Cup Final. The first broadcast involved the Atlanta Flames against the Chicago Blackhawks on January 25.

CBS only aired one other NHL game following game two of the 1979 Challenge Cup. That would take place on May 24, 1980, with Game 6 of the Stanley Cup Final between the Philadelphia Flyers and the New York Islanders. CBS was mainly influenced by the United States men's Olympic hockey team's surprise gold medal victory (dubbed "The Miracle on Ice") in Lake Placid three months earlier. CBS agreed to pay $37 million to broadcast the sixth game. In return, the NHL happily moved the starting time from prime time to the afternoon. The Saturday afternoon game was the first full American network telecast of an NHL game since game five of the 1975 Stanley Cup Final aired on NBC. As previously mentioned, when CBS broadcast game two of the 1979 Challenge Cup, it was only seen on CBS for the third period.

With USA's coverage of the 1981 Stanley Cup Playoffs, it marked the first time that there was "blanket" American television coverage of the NHL playoffs. In other words, often, whenever a game was played, it was televised on a national outlet (whether it was broadcast or cable). USA however, didn't televise game one of the playoff series between Philadelphia Flyers and Calgary Flames (April 16) because they were instead broadcasting a baseball game between the Pittsburgh Pirates and Philadelphia Phillies. Meanwhile, they also skipped Games 2–6 (on April 17, 22 and 24) of the Philadelphia–Calgary series because of their coverage of the NBA playoffs. USA also didn't televise Games 2 and 5 of the playoff series between the Calgary Flames and Minnesota North Stars (April 30 and May 7 respectively) because of baseball games involving the Minnesota Twins vs. the Boston Red Sox and the Los Angeles Dodgers vs. the Philadelphia Phillies respectively.

In the 1984–85 and 1985–86 seasons, the NHL returned to CTV, with regular season games on Friday nights (and some Sunday afternoons) as well as partial coverage of the playoffs and Stanley Cup Final.

CTV/Carling O'Keefe initially signed a contract well into the 1984–85 season. As a result, they wanted to cram as many games as possible (beginning in February) in the brief window they had. 1985-86's coverage didn't begin until November, so to avoid conflicts with CTV's coverage of the Major League Baseball postseason and the Canadian Football League.

While Molson continued to present Hockey Night in Canada on Saturday nights on the CBC, rival brewery Carling O'Keefe began airing Friday Night Hockey on CTV. This marked the first time in more than a decade that CBC was not the lone over-the-air network broadcaster of the National Hockey League in Canada.

After the 1984–85 season, the NHL Board of Governors chose to have USA and ESPN submit sealed bids. ESPN won by bidding nearly $25 million for three years, about twice as much as USA had been paying. The contract called for ESPN to air up to 33 regular-season games each season as well as the NHL All-Star Game and the Stanley Cup playoffs.

As previously mentioned, the contract called for ESPN to air up to 33 regular season games each season as well as the NHL All-Star game and the Stanley Cup playoffs. The network chose Dan Kelly and Sam Rosen to be the network's first play-by-play announcers, Mickey Redmond and Brad Park were selected to be the analysts, and Tom Mees and Jim Kelly were chosen to serve as studio hosts. ESPN designated Sundays as Hockey Night in America, but also aired select midweek telecasts. ESPN aired its first game, an opening-night matchup between the Washington Capitals and New York Rangers, on October 10, 1985.

ESPN did not have fixed broadcast teams during the 1985–86 season. Sam Rosen, Ken Wilson, Jim Hughson, Dan Kelly, Mike Lange, Jiggs McDonald, Jim Kelly, and Mike Patrick handled the play-by-play and Mickey Redmond, Bill Clement, John Davidson, Phil Esposito, and Brad Park provided color commentary.

The 1985–86 Canadian coverage of the All-Star Game was to be provided by CTV. However, CTV had a prior commitment to carry the third and final episode of Sins, a U.S. miniseries. As a result, TSN took over coverage of the game in Hartford.

Dan Kelly, Ron Reusch, and Bobby Taylor called the Calgary-St.Louis Campbell Conference Final series on CTV. CTV's coverage was blacked out in Calgary, where CBC provided coverage. For the Calgary Flames-Winnipeg Jets first-round series in 1985–86, CBC, who initially had the rights to the series, ultimately passed as they were already maxed out with three other series (Montreal-Boston, Chicago-Toronto, and Edmonton-Vancouver). The rights to the Calgary-Winnipeg series were eventually sold to the CTV affiliates in Calgary (CFCN) and Winnipeg (CKY) as well as Carling O'Keefe.

Following the 1985–86 season, CTV decided to pull the plug on the venture. Their limited access to Canadian-based teams (other than Quebec, whose English-speaking fan base was quite small) translated into poor ratings. For the next two years, Carling O'Keefe retained their rights, and syndicated playoff telecasts on a chain of local stations that would one day become the Global Television Network under the names Stanley Cup '87 and Stanley Cup '88, before a merger between the two breweries put an end to the competition.

SportsChannel America was the exclusive American broadcaster of the 1989 All-Star Game. The following year, they covered the first ever NHL Skills Competition and Heroes of Hockey game. SportsChannel America would continue their coverage of these particular events through 1992. In 1991, SportsChannel America replayed the third period of the All-Star Game on the same day that it was played. That was because NBC broke away from the live telecast during the third period in favor of Gulf War coverage.

In 1989, SportsChannel America provided the first ever American coverage of the NHL draft. In September 1989, SportsChannel America covered the Washington Capitals' training camp in Sweden and pre-season tour of the Soviet Union. The Capitals were joined by the Stanley Cup champion Calgary Flames, who held training camp in Prague, Czechoslovakia and then ventured to the Soviet Union. Each team played four games against Soviet National League clubs. Games were played in Moscow, Leningrad, Kyiv and Riga. The NHL clubs finished with a combined 6–2 record against the top Soviet teams, including the Red Army club and Dynamo Moscow. Five of the eight contests were televised by SportsChannel America.

Unfortunately, SportsChannel America was only available in a few major markets, and reached only a 1/3 of the households that ESPN did at the time. SportsChannel America was seen in fewer than 10 million households. In comparison, by the 1991–92 season, ESPN was available in 60.5 million homes whereas SportsChannel America was available in only 25 million. As a matter of fact, in the first year of the deal (1988–89), SportsChannel America was available in only 7 million homes when compared to ESPN's reach of 50 million. When the SportsChannel deal ended in 1992, the league returned to ESPN for another contract that paid $80 million over five years.

SportsChannel America took advantage of using their regional sports networks' feed of a game, graphics and all, instead of producing a show from the ground up, most of the time. Distribution of SportsChannel America across the country was limited to cities that had a SportsChannel regional sports network or affiliate. Very few cable systems in non-NHL territories picked it up as a stand-alone service. Regional affiliates of the Prime Network would sometimes pick up SportsChannel broadcasts, but this was often only during the playoffs, and often to justify the cost, some cable providers carrying it during the playoffs only carried it as a pay-per-view option. SportsChannel America also did not broadcast 24 hours a day at first, usually on by 6 pm, off by 12 Midnight, then a sportsticker for the next 18 hours.

=== 1990s ===
From 1990 through 1994, NBC only televised the All Star Game. NBC reportedly wanted to test the appeal of hockey, having recently lost the Major League Baseball package to CBS. Shortly thereafter however, NBC gained the broadcast television rights to the National Basketball Association (NBA) from CBS, thus there was a bit of a notion that NBC no longer really needed hockey.

The Montreal Canadiens were slated to host the 1990 All-Star Game, but the team withdrew their bid to considerations due to the superb hosting by Quebec City of Rendez-vous '87. This had allowed the Pittsburgh Penguins, which wanted to host an All-Star Game in 1993, to move up three years early. For its part, Pittsburgh's organizers added much more to previous games, creating the first "true" All-Star weekend. Firstly was the addition of the Heroes of Hockey game, a two-period oldtimers' game between past NHL greats. The second was the addition of the National Hockey League All-Star Skills Competition, a competition between the players invited to the All-Star Game. The Skills competition was created by Paul Palmer, who adapted the Showdown feature seen on Hockey Night in Canada from 1972–73 to 1979–80. All-Star players would be rewarded with US$2,500 for any win in the skills competition.

To accommodate the altered activities, the game itself was played on a Sunday afternoon instead of a Tuesday night, as was the case in previous years. This allowed NBC to air the game live across the United States – marking (surprisingly) the first time that a national audience would see Wayne Gretzky and Mario Lemieux play. Referees, other officials, and two head coaches were also wired with microphones in this game. Finally, NBC was also allowed to conduct interviews with players during stoppages in play, to the chagrin of the Hockey Night in Canada crew, whose attempts to do likewise were repeatedly denied by the league in previous years.

From its debut in 1992 until the 2001–02 NHL season, weekly regular-season games were broadcast on Sundays (between NFL and baseball seasons), Wednesdays, and Fridays, and were titled Sunday/Wednesday/Friday Night Hockey. Prior to 1999, these telecasts were non-exclusive, meaning they were blacked out in the regions of the competing teams, and an alternate game was shown in these affected areas. Beginning in 1999–2000 season, ESPN was permitted two exclusive telecasts per team per season. When ESPN started broadcasting NBA games on Wednesday and Friday nights in 2002, the weekly hockey broadcasts were moved to Thursday, and the broadcasts renamed to Thursday Night Hockey.

There were reports about NBC making an arrangement to air four to eight regular season games for the 1992–93 season but nothing materialized. NHL officials had arranged a four- to eight-game, time-buy package on NBC, but that fell through when the NHL wanted assurance that all NBC affiliates would carry the games (since 2006, NBC has generally gotten all but a couple of affiliates in the Top-50 markets to carry the games). For instance, in 1990, NBC's affiliates in Atlanta (NBC's coverage of the 1992 All-Star Game aired on the independent station WTLK in that market), Charlotte, Memphis, New Orleans, Indianapolis and Phoenix did not clear the game (Atlanta and Phoenix would eventually receive NHL teams, however the Atlanta franchise relocated to Winnipeg in 2011). Ultimately, roughly 15% of the nation did not have access to the game.

In the 1992–93 season, ABC televised five weekly playoff telecasts (the first three weeks were regional coverage of various games and two national games) on Sunday afternoons starting on April 18. This marked the first time that playoff National Hockey League games were broadcast on American network television since 1975 (when NBC was the NHL's American broadcast television partner).

In the 1993–94 season, ABC televised six weekly regional telecasts on the last three Sunday afternoons beginning on March 27, 1994. This marked the first time that regular season National Hockey League games were broadcast on American network television since 1974–75 (again when NBC was the NHL's American broadcast television partner). ABC then televised three weeks worth of playoff games on first three Sundays – the final game was game one of the Eastern Conference Semifinals between the Boston Bruins and the New Jersey Devils, a game that was aired nationally. The network did not televise the Stanley Cup Final, which instead, were televised nationally by ESPN and by Prime Ticket in Los Angeles (1993) and MSG Network in New York (1994). Games televised on ABC were not subject to blackout.

These broadcasts (just as was the case with the 1999–2004 package) were essentially, time-buys by ESPN. In other words, ABC would sell three-hour blocks of airtime to ESPN, which in return, would produce, supply broadcasters and sell advertising. Also as evidence by ABC's Raycom produced college basketball package around the same time period, this arrangement could also be interpreted as a way to avoid union contracts, which require that 100% of network shows had to use crew staff who were network union members. The main difference is that the graphics used for the telecasts were those used by ABC Sports, instead of the ones seen on ESPN National Hockey Night. In later years, the roles would be reversed as ESPN's graphical style would be used on the broadcasts with the exception of intermission reports. ABC even used ESPN's theme music for the 1992–1994 coverage. During ABC's next stint with the NHL, the network used its own theme music.

Beginning in 1993–94, up to five games per week were also shown on ESPN2 (dubbed "Fire on Ice"). During the Stanley Cup playoffs, ESPN and ESPN2 provided almost nightly coverage, often carrying games on both channels concurrently. Games in the first two rounds were non-exclusive, while telecasts in the Conference Finals and Stanley Cup Final were exclusive (except in 1993 and 1994).

When the NHL television contract went up for negotiation in early 1994, Fox (which was in the process of launching its sports division after acquiring the rights to the National Football Conference of the NFL) and CBS (which was hoping to land a major sports contract to replace the NFL rights that they lost to Fox and Major League Baseball rights that they lost to ABC and NBC) competed heavily for the package. On September 9, 1994, the National Hockey League reached a five-year, US$155 million contract with Fox for the broadcast television rights to the league's games, beginning with the 1994–95 season, ending ABC's time-buy deal with ESPN after just two seasons.

On the heels of its surprise acquisition of the television rights to the National Football League in December 1993, Fox sought deals with other major sports leagues to expand its newly created sports division, opting to go after the rights to broadcast National Hockey League (NHL) games. CBS, which had just lost its NFL package (which primarily included the rights to regular season and playoff games from the National Football Conference) to Fox, was the network's primary competitor for the NHL package, hoping to replace some of the sports programming it had lost to the upstart network.

Nevertheless, in a serious blow to the elder network, Fox outbid CBS for the NHL package as well. On September 9, 1994, the National Hockey League reached a five-year contract with Fox for the broadcast television rights to the league's games, beginning with the 1994–95 season. The network paid $155,000,000 ($31,000,000 annually) to televise NHL regular season and postseason games, considerably less than the $1,580,000,000 Fox paid for the NFL television rights.

The NHL's initial deal with Fox was significant, as a U.S. network television contract was long thought unattainable for the league during the presidency of John Ziegler. For 17 years after the 1975 Finals were broadcast on NBC, there was no national over-the-air network coverage of the NHL in the United States (except for the 1979 Challenge Cup and game six of the 1980 Stanley Cup Final on CBS, and NBC's coverage of the NHL All-Star Game from 1990 to 1994) and only spotty coverage on regional networks. This was due to the fact that no network was willing to commit to carrying a large number of games, in turn providing low ratings for NHL telecasts. ABC would eventually resume the network broadcasting of regular NHL games (on a time buy basis through ESPN) for the 1992–93 season. This continued through the 1993–94 season, before Fox took over for the next five seasons.

Fox inaugurated its NHL coverage on April 2, 1995, towards the end of the 1994–95 regular season, with six games (between the New York Rangers and Philadelphia Flyers; St. Louis Blues and Detroit Red Wings; Boston Bruins and Washington Capitals; Chicago Blackhawks and Dallas Stars; Florida Panthers and Tampa Bay Lightning; and the San Jose Sharks and Anaheim Ducks). Mike Emrick and John Davidson served as the lead broadcast team for national game broadcasts, while regionally-distributed games were handled by a variety of announcers, in addition to the trio. For the first four years of the deal, James Brown hosted the show and Dave Maloney was the studio analyst from the Fox Network Center studios in Los Angeles. For the fifth and final season, Suzy Kolber served as the studio host and Terry Crisp served as the studio analyst. Occasionally, active NHL players such as Mike Modano would serve as guest analysts.

Fox split coverage of the Stanley Cup Finals with ESPN. Game one of the 1995 Stanley Cup Final was the first Finals game shown on network television since 1980 and the first in prime time since 1973. Games one, five, and seven were usually scheduled to be televised by Fox; and games two, three, four, and six were set to air on ESPN. However, from 1995 to 1998, the Finals matches were all four game sweeps; the 1999 Finals ended in six games. The consequence was that – except for 1995, when Fox did televise game four – the decisive game seven was never shown on network television. Perhaps in recognition of this, Games three through seven were always televised by ABC in the succeeding broadcast agreement between the NHL and ABC Sports/ESPN.

TSN owned the national cable rights to the NHL in Canada from 1987 through 1998, after which what was then called CTV Sportsnet purchased the national cable rights to NHL games. Prior to this, TSN's NHL coverage was sparse as they only acquired games a la carte. From 1987 to 1988 to 1997–98, they usually showed games twice per week through the regular season and in the first round of the playoffs they provided extensive coverage of series not involving Canadian-based teams. TSN was the first ever holder of cable rights to the NHL in Canada, although the task of acquiring these rights were complicated by contradicting statements by CBC that it did own the cable rights to the NHL, along with the involvement of competing beer company Molson in Canadian NHL rights at the time (TSN was founded by its competitor, Labatt). With the help of a Molson employee who was a friend of TSN's founder Gordon Craig, a deal was reached between TSN, Molson, and the NHL.

In August 1998, ABC, ESPN and ESPN2 signed a five-year television deal with the NHL, worth a total of approximately US$600 million (or $120 million per year), dwarfing the $5.5 million that the NHL received from American national broadcasts in the 1991–92 season. As previously mentioned, as was the case with the 1992–1994 deal, ABC's subsequent NHL coverage was in reality, made up of time–buys from ESPN. This was noted in copyright beds at the conclusion of the telecasts, i.e. "The preceding program has been paid for by ESPN, Inc." ESPN then signed a similar television rights contract in 2002 so it could produce and broadcast National Basketball Association games on ABC.

ABC also televised the National Hockey League All-Star Game and games 3–7 of the Stanley Cup Final in prime time. In the league's previous broadcast television deal with Fox, the network split coverage of the Stanley Cup Finals with ESPN. Games one, five, and seven were usually scheduled to be televised by Fox; games two, three, four and six by ESPN. However, from 1995 to 1998, the Finals were all four-game sweeps; 1999 ended in six games. The consequence was that – except for 1995, when Fox did televise game four – the decisive game was never on network television.

From 1998 to 1999 until 2001–02, Sportsnet aired Labatt Blue Tuesday Night Hockey weekly during the regular season, and covered first-round playoff series that did not feature Canadian teams. The network's first live event was an opening night match between the Philadelphia Flyers and New York Rangers. Jim Hughson and Craig Simpson served as the lead broadcast team while Kevin Quinn and Ryan Walter served as the secondary broadcast team. Darren Dreger as the studio host and was joined by other personalities as studio analysts including Greg Millen (1998–1999), Nick Kypreos (1998–2002), and Mike Keenan (1999–2000).

=== 2000s ===
Beginning in 1999–2000 season, ESPN was permitted two exclusive telecasts per team per season. When ESPN started broadcasting NBA games on Wednesday and Friday nights in 2002, the weekly hockey broadcasts were moved to Thursday and the broadcasts renamed to Thursday Night Hockey.

ABC also televised the National Hockey League All-Star Game and Games 3–7 of the Stanley Cup Finals in prime time. In the league's previous broadcast television deal with Fox, the network split coverage of the Stanley Cup Finals with ESPN. Games one, five and seven were usually scheduled to be televised by Fox; games two, three, four and six by ESPN. However, from 1995 to 1998, the Finals were all four-game sweeps; 1999 ended in six games. The consequence was that – except for 1995, when Fox did televise game four – the decisive game was never on network television.

HDnet's coverage began in the 2001–02 season with a 65-game schedule. HDNet produced broadcasts in conjunction with several Fox Sports Net regional outlets, sharing audio and graphics with FSN's standard definition production units. NHL on HDNet prototypically, aired on Tuesday and Friday nights during its early years.

TSN's most recent period as national rightsholder lasted from 2002 to 2014. During this period, TSN usually televised three or four games per week during the regular season, with its flagship broadcast, Wednesday Night Hockey, airing on Wednesdays. During the playoffs, TSN had third, fifth, seventh, and eighth choices of first-round series, second and fourth in the second round, and second in the Conference Finals. These changes allowed TSN to broadcast playoff games involving Canadian teams, such as at the 2009 Stanley Cup Playoffs, as TSN televised the Calgary Flames' first-round series against the Chicago Blackhawks, the 2010 Stanley Cup Playoffs when the Montreal Canadiens defeated the Washington Capitals in seven games, and the 2013 Stanley Cup Playoffs when the Vancouver Canucks lost in four straight games to the San Jose Sharks.

In 2003, the Montreal Canadiens announced a deal to license its French-language broadcast rights for all of its preseason, season, and playoff games to RDS. This was controversial as it threatened the longest-running television show in Quebec, Radio-Canada's La Soirée du hockey. Days later, an agreement was reached whereby RDS and Radio-Canada would simultaneously broadcast Canadiens games on Saturday nights, saving the show. Within the province of Quebec, this arrangement stopped after the 2003–04 NHL season, and French-language Canadiens broadcasts now air only on RDS. Simulcasted coverage continued in regions that do not receive RDS on analog TV (all of Canada south/west of the Ottawa Region) on Radio-Canada until the 2006–07 NHL season. In addition to Canadiens games, RDS also televised a smaller package of Ottawa Senators games, which appear on either RDS or RDS Info as well as other games. RDS also had the French-language rights to the Stanley Cup playoffs and Finals through 2014, regardless of which teams participated.

In May 2004, NBC reached an agreement with the NHL to broadcast a slate of regular season games and the Stanley Cup Finals. The plan called for NBC to air at least six weeks of regular season games (three regional games each week) on Saturday afternoons. In addition, NBC was to show one or two playoff games per weekend during the playoffs. Between two and five games from the Stanley Cup Final would air in prime time (OLN/Versus received the other two as part of its package). NBC's primary game each week, as well as the Stanley Cup Finals, would air in high definition.

Unlike previous network television deals with the NHL (like Fox, which had the rights from 1994 to 1999 and ABC, which had the rights from 1999 to 2004), NBC paid no upfront rights fee, instead splitting advertising revenue with the league after meeting its own production and distribution costs. On the other hand, the league avoided the arrangement some minor sports leagues have, in which they pay networks for broadcast time and produce their own telecasts, but keep any advertising revenue.

Before the 2004–05 lockout, the NHL had reached two separate deals with NBC (who would replace ABC as the NHL's American national broadcast television partner) and ESPN. ESPN offered the NHL $60 million for about 40 games (only fifteen of which would be during the regular season), all on ESPN2, with presumably, only some midweek playoff games, the first two games of the Stanley Cup Final and the All-Star Game airing on ESPN.

NBC's deal involved a revenue sharing agreement with the NHL as opposed to a traditional rights fee, and included rights to six regular season windows, seven postseason broadcasts and games 3–7 of the Stanley Cup Final. ESPN had a two-year deal that they opted out of after the lockout, leaving the NHL without a cable partner. In August 2005, Comcast (who owns the Philadelphia Flyers) paid $70 million a year for three years to put games (54 or more games each season under the agreement, generally on Monday and Tuesday nights) on OLN, later known as Versus. Due to the abbreviated off-season, the 2005–06 schedule did not offer OLN exclusivity, which they received in 2006–07. Versus would also cover the playoffs and exclusively air Games 1 and 2 of the Stanley Cup Final.

Beginning with the 2008–09 season, Hockey Nights main games were simulcast weekly in the United States on NHL Network, complete with pre- and post-game shows. If U.S.-based teams appear in these games, the telecast is blacked out in the markets of the participating teams and is televised instead by the U.S. team's local broadcaster. For example, if the Toronto Maple Leafs host the Boston Bruins in "Hockey Night's" main game, the NHL Network's telecast is blacked-out in the Boston area and the game is instead televised by the Boston-based New England Sports Network (NESN). In the 2009–10 season, only the first game of the HNIC doubleheader is simulcast live on NHL Network, with the second game and post-game After Hours program being shown in tape delay on Sunday, the sole exception being the Hockey Day in Canada event. Since the Rogers takeover, however, HNIC games on NHL Network now feature games regardless of broadcaster (either CBC or a Rogers network).

=== 2010s ===
NBC renewed its rights to the NHL for the 2010–11 season. The network broadcast schedule continued to include the Winter Classic, Sunday-afternoon games at 12:30 pm. Eastern Time, six weekends of playoff action, and broadcasts of all but Games 3 and 4 of the Stanley Cup Final.

On February 20, 2011, NBC introduced Hockey Day in America – patterned after the CBC's Hockey Day in Canada, it featured eight of the most popular American teams in regional games: the Washington Capitals at the Buffalo Sabres (seen in the Buffalo and Washington, D.C. markets), the Philadelphia Flyers at the New York Rangers (seen nationally), and the Detroit Red Wings at the Minnesota Wild (only seen in Detroit and Minnesota markets), followed by the Pittsburgh Penguins at the Chicago Blackhawks for the national doubleheader. The tripleheader would be completed with the 2011 Heritage Classic, for which viewers were redirected to Versus.

On April 19, 2011, after ESPN, Turner Sports and Fox Sports placed bids, NBC Sports announced it had reached a ten-year extension to its television contract with the NHL (through the 2020–21 season) worth nearly $2 billion over the tenure of the contract. The contract would cover games on both NBC and sister cable channel Versus, which became part of the NBC Sports family as the result of Versus parent Comcast's controlling purchase of NBC Universal earlier in 2011. In relation to the contract's announcement, Versus would receive a new name to reflect its synergy with NBC Sports; the channel rebranded as NBC Sports Network on January 2, 2012 (it would later be abbreviated on-air and then officially shortened to NBCSN); NHL coverage on Versus would begin to be produced identically to NBC's NHL coverage beginning in the 2011–12 season, leading up to the brand change.

The terms of the deal included:

- A rights fee of roughly US$200 million per year for the combined cable and broadcast rights, nearly triple that of the previous contract;
- Increased weekly regular season coverage on Versus/NBCSN (as many as 90 games per season on Monday, Tuesday and Wednesday nights), with Sunday night games also being added by the channel later in the season.
- Rights to an annual "Thanksgiving Showdown" game airing on NBC the day after Thanksgiving ("Black Friday" afternoon) (the 2012 edition was cancelled due to the 2012–13 NHL lockout). The November broadcast is the earliest an NHL regular season game has aired on a broadcast television network in the U.S. since the 1950s, when the league still only had six teams. The 2013 "Thanksgiving Showdown" game featured the Boston Bruins hosting the New York Rangers; it was widely expected that Boston will remain the home team in future years and launch a holiday tradition for the league and network (Boston has hosted matinee games the day after Thanksgiving since the 1980s), much like Detroit and Dallas traditionally host National Football League games on Thanksgiving Day; however, NBC decided to end this tradition for the 2014–15 season, with a Black Friday matinee between the Philadelphia Flyers and New York Rangers being aired instead, while Boston held a locally televised game on the evening of Black Friday in 2014. Boston resumed hosting the game in 2015, with a second Black Friday game (Chicago at Anaheim) airing later in the afternoon on NBCSN.
- Continued coverage on NBC of the NHL Winter Classic, to be played on New Year's Day unless that day lands on a Sunday, in which case the game is moved to January 2 (despite the open time slot on Sunday afternoons, NBC is effectively forbidden via a gentleman's agreement with the NFL which prevents any form of strong counterprogramming against NFL games televised on CBS and Fox). Initially the Classic was expected to be played in primetime, however to date every game has been scheduled for a 1 pm ET start, and due to new competition from the College Football Playoff the game is now expected to remain a daytime game for the foreseeable future. NBC has instead opted to air one prime time game each year, later in the season, since 2014.
- A national "Game of the Week" continuing on NBC as in previous years, beginning each January (January is the start month due to NBC's contract with the NFL).
- Hockey Day in America becoming a permanent annual part of the NBC schedule.
- Rights to any future Heritage Classics, which would be aired on NBCSN.
- Digital rights across all platforms for any games broadcast by NBC or NBCSN.
- Increased coverage of Stanley Cup Playoff games, with all playoff games airing nationally on NBC, NBCSN, CNBC, USA, and NHL Network. (even Golf Channel have also been used for Stanley Cup playoff games.) Local sports networks can carry their teams' first-round games, but any games on NBC, and any NBC cable games from the second round onward, will be exclusive to NBC.
- Continued sharing of the Stanley Cup Final on NBC (which will air games one, two, and all "if needed" games) and NBCSN (games three and four). The deal gives NBC the option of moving games three and four to the broadcast network. During the 2013 Stanley Cup Final, NBC aired games one, four, five, six and seven while NBCSN aired games two and three.

Currently, NHL regular season games on NBC are exclusive to the network. While most NHL games on NBCSN are exclusive (such as Wednesday Night Hockey), other games carried by the network may be blacked out regionally in favor of television stations or regional sports networks which hold the local broadcast rights to an NHL franchise. Among the games normally blacked out from NBCSN include teams that are carried by their respective NBC Sports Regional Networks (Chicago Blackhawks broadcasts are shared between NBC Sports Chicago and WGN), as well as the Boston Bruins (NESN), Detroit Red Wings (Fox Sports Detroit), New York Rangers (MSG) and Pittsburgh Penguins (AT&T SportsNet Pittsburgh).

In preparation for the re-launch of Versus as NBC Sports Network (now NBCSN) in January 2012 as part of a major re-launch of the NBC Sports division coinciding with the 2012 NHL Winter Classic, all broadcasts on Versus transitioned to the NHL on NBC branding and presentation beginning in the 2011–12 season.

In the 2012–13 season, Wednesday night games on NBCSN were rebranded as Wednesday Night Rivalry, primarily featuring rivalry games. For the 2013–14 season, NBC Sports introduced the series NHL Rivals, which looks back at the participating teams' historic rivalry leading up to the featured Wednesday Night Rivalry game.

On November 26, 2013, Rogers Communications publicly announced its 12-year deal to become the exclusive national rightsholder for the National Hockey League beginning in the 2014–15 season. Valued at $5.2 billion over the length of the contract, and covering television and digital rights to the league (national French rights were sub-licensed to Quebecor Media for TVA Sports), the value of the contract surpasses the league's most recent U.S. rights deal with NBC by more than double. Under the contract, Rogers paid $150 million upfront, and will make annual payments beginning at $300 million, escalating to $500 million over the life of the contract. As part of the deal, Rogers also took over Canadian distribution of the NHL Centre Ice and GameCentre Live services. Rogers Media president Keith Pelley emphasized the increased amount and accessibility of NHL content that Rogers planned to offer under the deal, stating that "Canadians will have more games, more content and more choice than they've ever had before." Also of note was Rogers' plans to maintain the long-running Hockey Night in Canada on CBC through a sub-licensing agreement with the league's previous broadcast television rightsholder, but also extend the brand by airing Hockey Night games across its own networks alongside CBC.

=== 2020s ===
With the NBC Sports contract expiring at the end of the 2020–21 season, the league has explored the possibility of splitting its U.S. national media rights between multiple broadcasters, and over-the-top services (such as DAZN, ESPN+, or NBC's Peacock). In any case, the league aimed to surpass the US$2 billion total that NBC paid over the life of their 2011–12 to 2020–21 contract. On March 10, 2021, the NHL announced that ESPN would serve as one of the new rightsholders under a seven-year contract, which will include packages of regular season games for ESPN and ABC (including opening night, the All-Star Game, and other special events), 75 original telecasts and all out-of-market games on ESPN+, rights to half of the Stanley Cup playoffs (including one conference final per-season), and four Stanley Cup Final over the length of the contract.

On April 26, 2021, Sports Business Journal reported that NBC had officially pulled out of bidding for future NHL rights, meaning that NBC will not televise NHL games for the first time since the 2004–05 NHL lockout. The next day, Turner Sports announced that they had agreed to a seven-year deal with the NHL to broadcast at least 72 games nationally on TNT and TBS (while also giving HBO Max the live streaming and simulcast rights to these games) beginning with the 2021–22 season, which will include three Stanley Cup Finals, the other half of the Stanley Cup playoffs, and the Winter Classic.

In the years before the end of NBC's latest contract with the NHL, the league explored options for splitting its national broadcast rights, similar to the television deals of the NFL, NBA and MLB. This included selling packages to streaming services, aiming to maximize the value of its broadcast rights. On March 10, 2021, Disney, ESPN, and the NHL announced that a seven-year agreement was reached for ESPN to hold the first half of its new media rights beginning in the 2021–22 season;

- ESPN will hold rights to at least 25 exclusive national games per season, which can air on either ESPN or ABC, and will include exclusive rights to opening night games. All Games on ABC stream on ESPN+.
- 75 exclusive national games per season will be streamed exclusively on ESPN+, and will not be carried on linear television. These games will also be available to Hulu subscribers.
- ESPN+ will stream all out-of-market games, as well as on-demand versions of all nationally televised games.
- ESPN will hold rights to All-Star Weekend, with the Skills Competition airing on ESPN, and the All-Star Game airing on ABC.
- ESPN will hold rights to the NHL entry draft.
- ESPN and ESPN2 will share in coverage of the Stanley Cup playoffs, holding rights to "half" of the games in the first two rounds, and one conference final per-season. ESPN/ABC will have the first choice of which conference final series to air. The remaining half will air on TNT and TBS.
- Exclusive rights to the Stanley Cup Final will alternate between ABC and TNT; ESPN will have the ability to air simulcast coverage with alternate feeds on its other channels and platforms.
- ESPN2 airs a weekly studio program dedicated to the NHL, The Point (which is hosted by John Buccigross), and ESPN will hold various highlights and international rights.

On May 10, 2021, Andrew Marchand of the New York Post reported that TSN's Ray Ferraro (who previously worked for ESPN from 2002-2004), and NBC's Brian Boucher had signed with ESPN to become their top hockey analysts. On May 17, ESPN hired former Calgary Flames studio host Leah Hextall to be a regular play-by-play announcer on NHL broadcasts. She is the first woman in league history to hold that role. Hextall previously worked the 2016 World Cup of Hockey, and has worked the NCAA Division I Men's Ice Hockey Tournament for ESPN.

On June 9, 2021, ESPN announced that current New Jersey Devils defenseman P.K. Subban would be a studio analyst for the remainder of the 2021 Stanley Cup Playoffs, making his debut on SportsCenter that day. The same day, Craig Morgan, Arizona-based reporter on the Arizona Coyotes and NHL Network correspondent, reported that ESPN had added NBC's Ryan Callahan and A. J. Mleczko to their analyst roster, and that NHL Network's Kevin Weekes, who also worked for ESPN during the 2016 World Cup of Hockey, was in talks to return to ESPN in an analyst/reporter role. Marchand later reported that Weekes had signed with ESPN, and that Bob Wischusen, who currently calls play-by-play for ESPN's college football and basketball broadcasts, will also work NHL broadcasts. On June 24, ESPN officially announced that six-time Stanley Cup Champion Mark Messier had signed a multi-year deal to join ESPN in a studio analyst role. Messier's signing was the first announced signing made by ESPN, and potentially was made as a counter to TNT signing Messier's former teammate Wayne Gretzky, who was also recruited by ESPN. On June 28, Marchand reported that three time Stanley Cup Champion Chris Chelios would also join ESPN as a studio analyst. The same day, The Athletic reported that current Hockey Night in Canada color commentator/reporter Cassie Campbell-Pascall would also join ESPN.

ESPN formally confirmed its commentator teams on June 29, 2021. ESPN's college football No. 2 play-by-play man Sean McDonough would be the network's lead play-by-play announcer; Monday Night Football's Steve Levy would lead studio coverage and contribute to occasional play-by-play commentary. Hextall and Wischusen were officially named as play-by-play commentators, as well as SportsCenter's John Buccigross, who will also contribute as an alternate studio host, and serve as the host for The Point. ESPN legend Barry Melrose, Messier, Chelios, Ferraro, Boucher, Weekes, Campbell-Pascall, Callahan, Mleczko, ESPN New York's Rick DiPietro, and 2018 gold medalist Hilary Knight would contribute as booth, ice-level, and studio analysts. 2016 Isobel Cup champion Blake Bolden was added to join insiders Emily Kaplan and Greg Wyshynski as insiders and ice-level reporters. Linda Cohn would continue her duties hosting In the Crease, while also gaining roles as an ice-level reporter and backup studio and game break host. On August 4, 2021, ESPN announced that they added most recent Blue Jackets coach and Stanley Cup winning coach John Tortorella as an extra studio analyst.

On September 16, after ESPN released their slate of games for the 2021–22 season, SportsCenter anchor and ESPN Social host Arda Ocal would announce himself that he too would host select game broadcasts. On October 2, former referee Dave Jackson joined the network as a rules analyst, an NHL first. Early into the 2021–22 season, ESPN added former NBC analyst Dominic Moore, who had hosted the expansion draft with Weekes and ESPN College Football personality Chris Fowler. Laura Rutledge, host of NFL Live and SEC Nation, joined the NHL on ESPN team for their coverage of the 2022 NHL All-Star Game, in a celebrity interviewer role. After preparing for and playing in the 2022 Winter Olympics in Beijing, Knight made her ESPN debut on the March 10, 2022, episode of "The Point", coincidentally on the one-year anniversary of ESPN regaining the rights to broadcast the NHL. Bolden, who has been working as a pro scout for the Los Angeles Kings since 2020, made her official ESPN on-air debut on the March 17 episode of "The Point". After the regular season kicked into high gear, Knight and Bolden were the only two who still had to make their on-air debuts with ESPN. Occasionally, other well known ESPN personalities like Jeremy Schaap, Kevin Connors, Michael Eaves, and Max McGee will be added in fill-in roles on The Point and in the Crease. Mike Monaco, Roxy Bernstein, and Caley Chelios, daughter of Chris, have also filled in on game coverage.TSN's Gord Miller, Ferraro's broadcast partner for Maple Leafs games on TSN, joined ESPN for the 2022 Stanley Cup playoffs. Subban returned to ESPN for the Playoffs in an expanded role, which includes being a game analyst for select games.

ESPN also confirmed that Spanish language coverage of the NHL would air on ESPN Deportes; Kenneth Garay, and Eitán Benezra will be the main play-by-play commentators while Carlos Rossell and Antonio Valle contribute analysis and color commentary. Rigoberto Plascencia was later added as another play-by-play announcer.

For the 2021–22 season, ESPN aired 18 games under ESPN Hockey Night, while 75 exclusive national games per season would be streamed exclusively on ESPN+. For the 2021–22 season, most of these games under ESPN+ Hockey Night aired on Tuesday and Thursday nights, with select Friday night games. These games will also be available to Hulu subscribers. ESPN's first broadcasts were an opening night doubleheader, with the Pittsburgh Penguins at the defending Stanley Cup champions Tampa Bay Lightning, and the Seattle Kraken at the Vegas Golden Knights in the Kraken's first regular-season game in franchise history.

For the 2022–23 season, out-of-market games on ESPN+–which did not carry any specific branding in the inaugural season–were branded as "NHL Power Play on ESPN+". ESPN (35)/ESPN2 (1) aired 36 games, under ESPN Hockey Night, while ABC aired 14 games under the ABC Hockey Saturday package, which will consist of 4 doubleheaders and one late-season tripleheader beginning the weekend after the All-Star break.

On April 27, 2021, Turner Sports agreed to a seven-year deal with the National Hockey League to broadcast at least 72 games nationally on TNT and TBS beginning with the 2021–22 NHL season;

- TNT will hold rights up to 72 exclusive national games per-season. In practice these games have primarily been Wednesday-night doubleheaders, with occasional games also scheduled on weekends. Other Turner networks, such as TruTV, are used as overflow in the event that a game on TNT runs long.
- TNT will hold rights to the NHL Winter Classic and NHL Stadium Series annually.
- TNT and TBS will share in coverage of the Stanley Cup playoffs with ESPN and ESPN2, holding rights to "half" of the games in the first two rounds, and one conference final per-season (ESPN/ABC will have the first choice of conference finals).
- TNT will hold rights to the Stanley Cup Final in odd-numbered years beginning 2023, alternating with ABC.
- There is an option for HBO Max to hold over-the-top streaming rights, including simulcasts of TNT's games, and the option for games exclusive to the service. WarnerMedia executives indicated following the contract announcement that they had only just begun to study how the streaming service might be involved, and that they did not plan to air games on HBO Max within the 2021 calendar year.
- TNT will produce a studio show for its coverage, modeled after Inside the NBA.
- Bleacher Report will be able to distribute highlights on digital platforms. The site launched Open Ice, a new content brand focusing on NHL-related content. Online personality and streamer Andrew "Nasher" Telfer was hired as a contributor for the brand.

The contract was reported to be valued at $225 million per-season.

On May 5, 2021, Richard Dietsch of The Athletic reported that Kenny Albert and Eddie Olczyk would serve as the lead broadcast team respectively for Turner Sports, retaining their lead roles from the previous season on NBC. On May 25, the New York Post's Andrew Marchand reported that Wayne Gretzky would be a lead studio analyst on Turner. Turner confirmed the hiring of Albert, Olczyk, and Gretzky in these roles the following day. On September 14, 2021, TNT announced its slate of on-air staff for its inaugural season. Keith Jones, who served as a studio analyst at NBC, would serve as the lead ice-level reporter, joining Albert and Olczyk on the lead broadcast team. Brendan Burke and Darren Pang were named as the secondary broadcast team. Liam McHugh and Anson Carter were named to the studio team, along with former Coyotes head coach Rick Tocchet and veteran Paul Bissonnette, who all joined Gretzky in studio. Hockey Night in Canada’s Jennifer Botterill, and NHL Network's Jackie Redmond, and Tarik El-Bashir also appear as contributors. TNT later added former referee Don Koharski as a rules analyst, and former Blackhawk Jamal Mayers as an extra contributor. On November 23, TNT added retired Rangers goaltender Henrik Lundqvist to its studio panel, starting on the next day's broadcast. On November 30, TNT welcomed former referee Stéphane Auger to their team, as another rules analyst, joining Koharski. He made his debut during the Penguins-Oilers game the next night. On January 13, 2022, TNT added Nabil Karim, formerly of ESPN, to contribute as secondary studio host and reporter for both the NHL and the NBA. Former NBC and current Kraken play-by-play announcer John Forslund was picked up by TNT as a fill-in announcer, whenever Albert or Burke are on assignment. Forslund first filled in for Albert for the Avalanche-Golden Knights game on February 16, as Albert was working the Olympic women's hockey gold medal game for NBC about an hour after puck drop. Sharks color commentator Bret Hedican also joined in a fill-in role, joining Forslund in Vancouver on March 9. TNT added several announcers to their roster for the playoffs, including Randy Hahn, Dave Goucher, Jim Jackson, Butch Goring, Drew Remenda, Shane Hnidy and Jody Shelley.

For the 2021–22 season, TNT aired 50 games, primarily on Wednesday nights (with 15 doubleheaders), as well as seven weeks of Sunday afternoon games in March and April 2022, and all three outdoor games (the Winter Classic, Stadium Series, and Heritage Classic). TNT's first broadcasts were a preseason doubleheader on September 30, 2021, between the Boston Bruins and Philadelphia Flyers, and the Vegas Golden Knights and Los Angeles Kings. TNT then aired its first regular season games on October 13, 2021, with a doubleheader between the New York Rangers and Washington Capitals, and the Chicago Blackhawks and Colorado Avalanche.

Due to conflicts with TNT's first two NHL doubleheaders, AEW: Dynamite was pre-empted to Saturday on the weeks of October 13 and 20. From October 27 through December 15, 2021, TNT aired only a single, 10 p.m. ET game with Dynamite as a lead-in (which concurrently began broadcasting live on both TNT's East and West feeds). TNT then began airing doubleheaders on January 5, 2022, when Dynamite moved to TBS.

In the 2022–23 season, TNT announced a 62-game regular season schedule, normally airing on Wednesdays throughout the regular season and on four Sundays during March and April. In addition to gaining exclusive rights to the 2023 Stanley Cup Final and the 2023 NHL Winter Classic, TNT would also gain the rights to the annual Thanksgiving Showdown on Friday, November 25, featuring a doubleheader between the Pittsburgh Penguins and the Philadelphia Flyers, and the St. Louis Blues at the Tampa Bay Lightning. TNT would also schedule a rare Tuesday doubleheader on November 8, with the Edmonton Oilers at the Tampa Bay Lightning followed by the Nashville Predators at the Seattle Kraken.

For the 2024–25 and 2025–26 seasons, Rogers sublicensed Monday Night Hockey to Amazon Prime Video as a streaming-exclusive package.

Sportsnet signed a 12-year renewal to extend its agreement to 2037–38. Most of the existing broadcast arrangements from the previous contract will remain in effect, although Rogers stated that it would be able to flex more regional games from its networks to national telecasts. Rogers and Prime Video also signed a 12-year sublicensing deal which would see Prime air NHL games on Wednesday nights as well as exclusive coverage of two first round and one second round playoff series. Rogers and Quebecor Media also signed a 12-year sublicensing deal for TVA Sports to continue airing French-language broadcasts. However, CBC Television confirmed that it would no longer sublicense NHL coverage from Rogers, citing changes in its sports strategy following the 2026 Winter Olympics. The change resulted in the end of Hockey Night in Canada airing NHL games after 74 years.

== See also ==
- Major League Baseball on television
- Major League Soccer on television
- National Basketball Association on television
- National Football League on television

== Sources ==
- McKinley, Michael (2006), Hockey: A People's History, McClelland & Stewart, ISBN 0-7710-5769-5
- Pincus, Arthur (2006), The Official Illustrated NHL History, Reader's Digest, ISBN 1-57243-445-7
