= NHL Network (1975 TV program) =

American television syndication package

The NHL Network (Known later on as The NHL '78 and '79 respectively) was an American television syndication package that broadcast National Hockey League games from the 1975–76 through 1978–79 seasons. The NHL Network was distributed by the Hughes Television Network.

== Conception ==
After being dropped by NBC after the 1974–75 season, the NHL had no national television contract in the United States. In response to this, the league put together a network of independent stations covering approximately 55% of the country.

== Coverage summary ==
Games typically aired on Monday nights (beginning at 8 p.m. ET) or Saturday afternoons. The package was offered to local stations with no rights fee. Profits would be derived from the advertising, which was about evenly split between the network and the local station. The Monday night games were often billed as The NHL Game of the Week. Viewers in New York City, Buffalo, St. Louis, Pittsburgh, Detroit and Los Angeles got the Game of the Week on a different channel than their local team's games. Therefore, whenever a team had a “home” game, the NHL Network aired the home team's broadcast rather than their own.

Initially, the Monday night package was marketed to ABC affiliates, the idea being that ABC carried Monday-night NFL football in the fall and (starting in May 1976) Monday-night Major League Baseball in the spring and summer; as such, stations would want hockey to create a year-round Monday night sports block. But very few ABC stations picked up the package.

During the 1975–76 season, the NHL Network showed selected games from the NHL Super Series (the big one in that package was Red Army at Philadelphia, but the package did not include Red Army at Montreal on New Year's Eve 1975, which was seen only on CBC) as well as some playoff games. During the 1976–77 season, the NHL Network showed 12 regular season games on Monday nights plus the All-Star Game. By 1978–79 (the final season of the NHL Network's existence), there were 18 Monday night games and 12 Saturday afternoon games covered.

The 1979 Challenge Cup replaced the All-Star Game. It was a best-of-three series between the NHL All-Stars against the Soviet Union national squad. Only the third period of Game 2, which was on a Saturday afternoon, was shown on CBS as part of The CBS Sports Spectacular. Unfortunately, CBS and their sponsors had a problem with the rink board advertising that the NHL sold at Madison Square Garden, and refused to allow them to be shown on TV. As a result, CBS viewers were unable to see the far boards above the yellow kickplate, and could only see players' skates when the play moved to that side of the ice. Games 1 and 3 were shown on the NHL Network, where the advertising was no problem.

=== Saturday afternoon coverage ===
When Saturday afternoon games were added, the NHL said that they would start at 1 p.m. and end by 4 p.m. ET. Markets with only three stations were reluctant to give up prime time programming slots. Ultimately, the plan failed, as not only did they not gain new markets, but many stations that already carried the Monday game didn't pick up the Saturday one. A few of the markets in the Eastern Time Zone that aired the Saturday afternoon games included Boston, Buffalo, New York City, Washington and Springfield, MA.

In addition, the NHL gave stations the option of starting the Saturday afternoon broadcasts at 1 Eastern time or starting at 2 EST, with the full open and a first-period summary preceding live action of the final two periods. WDCA (the Washington, D.C. affiliate) and WWLP (the Springfield, MA affiliate) took that option. WPGH in Pittsburgh and WTCG in Atlanta didn't pick up the Saturday package, leaving their markets without Saturday coverage. WPGH and WTCG also showed the Monday games on tape delay at midnight and 11:30 p.m. ET, respectively. Meanwhile, by 1978, WUAB in Cleveland and WBFF in Baltimore dropped hockey coverage completely (Cleveland lost its NHL team, the Cleveland Barons, that year after just three seasons in that city, which may have led WUAB to drop the package).

Also in Buffalo, the Saturday afternoon games during January and February were on WGR. Meanwhile, the Saturday games during March were on WUTV. WUTV carried the Monday Night Hockey package, while WGR was the over-the-air station for the Buffalo Sabres. In New York, WOR did not carry Saturday games in January or February. Meanwhile, WNEW (also in New York) carried the March Saturday games (at 2 p.m.). In both Buffalo and New York, college basketball and World Championship Tennis they knocked the NHL off its usual Monday night carrier.

In 1977–78, KBJR in Duluth picked up the Saturday afternoon package and dropped the Monday night games. In that same season, WHMB in Indianapolis joined the network with Saturday afternoon games at 2 p.m. and Monday night games at 11 p.m. In addition, the Iowa PBS stations had dropped the NHL by this point.

=== Playoff coverage ===
The 1976 Stanley Cup Final on the NHL Network marked the first time that the NHL's championship series was nationally televised in its entirety in the United States. When the NHL Network broadcast playoff games in 1976, Marv Albert split play-by-play duties with an announcer from one of the participating teams. For instance, on April 18, 1976 (Montreal at Chicago), it was Brad Palmer (who was the intermission host for Chicago Black Hawks telecasts on WFLD 32) who split the play-by-play duties with Albert. Albert did play-by-play for the first and third periods while Palmer did the second. Starting in the 1978 playoffs, the NHL Network began simulcasting many games with Hockey Night in Canada. In these games, Dan Kelly, who was the NHL Network's lead play-by-play announcer, was assigned to do play-by-play along with HNIC color commentators. This for example, happened in Game 7 of the quarterfinal series between the Toronto Maple Leafs and New York Islanders (April 29), where Kelly teamed up with Brian McFarlane. The entire 1978 Stanley Cup Final between the Montreal Canadiens and Boston Bruins and the entire 1979 Stanley Cup Final between the Montreal Canadiens and New York Rangers were both simulcasted as well. However, had that final gone to Game 7, then that game would have been broadcast on ABC.

== Affiliates ==
In most U.S. NHL cities, the Hughes NHL affiliate was the same one that aired the local team's games. About a couple of dozen other stations carried the games. The network had 47 stations for the 1976–77 season.

City	Station
Atlanta	WTCG
Baltimore	WBFF
Boston	WSBK
Buffalo	WUTV (Monday night games)
Buffalo	WGR/WUTV (Saturday afternoon games)
Charlotte	WRET
Chicago	WSNS
Cleveland	WUAB (tape delay)
Council Bluffs	KBIN
Dallas	KXTX (tape delay to 10 p.m. CT)
Denver	KWGN
Des Moines	KDIN
Detroit	WGPR
Duluth	KBJR
Galveston	Local cable
Greenfield	WRLP
Greensboro	WGHP
Houston	KRIV (tape delay to 11:30 p.m. CT)
Indianapolis	WHMB
Iowa City/Cedar Rapids	KIIN
Los Angeles	KHJ (tape delay to 8 p.m. PT)
Miami	WPBT
New York City	WOR
New York City	WNEW
Omaha	KETV (tape delay to 11:30 p.m. CT)
Philadelphia	WTAF
Pittsburgh	WPGH
Red Oak	KHIN
Rochester, NY	WROC
San Francisco	KQED
Seattle	KSTW (tape delay to 10:30 p.m. PT)
Sioux City	KSIN
Springfield	WWLP
St. Louis	KDNL
Washington, D.C.	WDCA (tape delay to 9 p.m. ET)

Despite the presence of the Minnesota North Stars, there was no NHL Network affiliate in the Minneapolis-St. Paul area.

== Ratings ==
By the time that NBC’s contract with the NHL ended after the 1974–75, they were getting a 3.8 rating. Meanwhile, the ratings for the NHL Network in its first month of existence were 3.1 in New York, 1.9 in Los Angeles, and 1.3 in Chicago. By 1978–79, the Monday night games were seen by about 1 million viewers; 300,000 of which were in the Boston area. Also in 1978–79, the 2 p.m. ET version of the Saturday broadcasts (with the first period cut out) was picked up by all participating affiliates except WSBK-TV Boston (which carried the entire game), and often, the cities whose local teams were playing if the local station aired the NHL Network version of a game instead of a locally produced broadcast.

== Announcers ==
=== Play-by-play ===
- Marv Albert
- Fred Cusick
- Ted Darling (primarily in games involving Buffalo)
- Don Earle
- Jim Gordon
- Gene Hart
- Dan Kelly
- Jiggs McDonald – In 1976–77, McDonald split play-by-play and analyst duties with Tim Ryan during Games 3 and 4 of the Montreal Canadiens-New York Islanders playoff series (April 28 and 30)
- Sam Nover
- Brad Palmer
- Tim Ryan

Marv Albert was the lead play-by-play man during the first season in which he was paired with a local guest announcer. They typically, would split play-by-play duties.

As previously mentioned, for Game 4 of the 1976 quarterfinal playoff series between the Montreal Canadiens and Chicago Black Hawks (April 16), Marv Albert and Brad Palmer called the game. Albert handled play-by-play for the first and third period while Palmer, the Black Hawks' TV host, handled play-by-play for the second period. They in the process, acted as analysts for each other. Played at Chicago Stadium, the game was blacked out in the Chicago area.

Meanwhile, Marv Albert also during the 1976 playoffs, teamed with Tim Ryan (who split play-by-play duties with Albert) and George Michael for Game 1 of the New York Islanders-Buffalo Sabres series (April 11) and Terry Crisp for Game 7 of the Toronto Maple Leafs-Philadelphia Flyers series (April 25). Terry Crisp also worked alongside play-by-play men Gene Hart and Don Earle on Game 4 of the Toronto-Philadelphia mentioned above series (April 17).

=== Color commentary ===
- Don Awrey
- Curt Bennett
- Bill Chadwick
- Terry Crisp
- Gary Dornhoefer
- Phil Esposito
- John Ferguson Sr.
- Eddie Giacomin – In 1977–78, Giacomin worked with Dan Kelly on Game 3 of the Philadelphia Flyers-Buffalo Sabres playoff series (April 22)
- Bobby Hull
- Steve Jensen – In 1976–77, Jensen worked with Marv Albert on Game 4 of the Philadelphia Flyers-Toronto Maple Leafs playoff series (April 17)
- George Michael – In 1975–76, Michael worked with Marv Albert and Tim Ryan (who split play-by-play duties) on Game 1 of the New York Islanders-Buffalo playoff series.
- Stan Mikita
- Lou Nanne
- Bobby Orr
- Chico Resch
- Garry Unger

The analysts for the 1976 Stanley Cup Final were active players and each game featured different color commentators. These players were Stan Mikita, Garry Unger, Chico Resch and Curt Bennett. This format continued in 1977 with Stan Mikita, Garry Unger, Chico Resch, Don Awrey replacing Curt Bennett, who instead worked with Marv Albert and Dan Kelly on Game 4 of the Philadelphia Flyers-Boston Bruins playoff series (May 1).

=== Other ===
- Stan Fischler
- Jim Simpson
- Dick Stockton
- Scott Wahle

Dick Stockton served as host for a season. Scott Wahle was the studio host for the 1978–79 and 1979–80 seasons. Meanwhile, Stan Fischler was on the broadcasts as an intermission analyst.

Preceded by NBC	NHL broadcast television partner in the United States; 1975 – 1979	Succeeded by CBS and Hughes
