= 1975–76 Philadelphia Flyers season =

NHL hockey team season

1975–76 Philadelphia Flyers
- Campbell Conference champions
- Patrick Division champions
- Division: 1st Patrick
- Conference: 1st Campbell
- 1975–76 record: 51–13–16
- Home record: 36–2–2
- Road record: 15–11–14
- Goals for: 348 (1st)
- Goals against: 209 (3rd)

Team information
- General manager: Keith Allen
- Coach: Fred Shero
- Captain: Bobby Clarke
- Alternate captains: None (Note: The alternate captain position was abolished from the 1975–76 season through the 1984–85 season.)
- Arena: Spectrum
- Average attendance: 17,077
- Minor league affiliates: Richmond Robins; Philadelphia Firebirds

Team leaders
- Goals: Reggie Leach (61)
- Assists: Bobby Clarke (89)
- Points: Bobby Clarke (119)
- Penalty minutes: Dave Schultz (307)
- Plus/minus: Bobby Clarke (+83)
- Wins: Wayne Stephenson (40)
- Goals against average: Gary Inness (1.51)

The 1975–76 Philadelphia Flyers season was the franchise's ninth season in the National Hockey League (NHL). The Flyers reached the Stanley Cup Final for the third consecutive year, but they lost to the Montreal Canadiens in a four-game sweep.

== Regular season ==
The Flyers recorded the best record in team history (points wise) with a record of 51–13–16 in 1975–76. They also tied the record set by the 1929–30 Boston Bruins for most consecutive home ice wins, with 20. (Note: Whereas the 1975–76 Flyers won all 20 at home in regulation, in the early days, teams have to win in regulation or overtime for it to count in the winning streak. Notably, 1929–30 Boston Bruins won 20 at home (18 in regulation). Now, current rules state a winning streak is wins in any manner. Most notably, the 2011–12 Detroit Red Wings, who are the current NHL record holders with 23 consecutive home wins, won only 19 in regulation (one in overtime and three in shootouts).) The 1975–76 Flyers continue to hold the all-time records for most regulation wins at home (Note: Prior to the 2011–12 Red Wings, one other team won at least 20 home games, this being the 1929–30 Boston Bruins (20 home wins, 18 in regulation).) The LCB line, featuring Reggie Leach at right-wing, Bobby Clarke at center, and Bill Barber at left-wing, set an NHL record for goals by a single line with 141 (Leach 61, Clarke 30, Barber 50). Clarke, on his way to a third Hart Trophy, set a club record for points in one season with 119.

The highlight of the season had no bearing on the season standings. On January 11 at the Spectrum, the Flyers, as part of the Super Series '76, played a memorable exhibition game against the Soviet Union's dominant Central Red Army team. As the Bullies had put intimidation to good use the past three years, the Flyers' rugged style of play led the Soviets to leave the ice midway through the first period, protesting a hit by Ed Van Impe on Valeri Kharlamov (whom Clarke had slashed on the ankle in the famous Summit Series '72). After some delay, the Soviets returned after they were warned that they would lose their salary for the entire series. The Flyers went on to win the game rather easily, 4–1, and were the only team to defeat the Red Army outright in the series. Head coach Fred Shero would proclaim, "Yes we are world champions. If they had won, they would have been world champions. We beat the hell out of a machine."

=== Season standings ===
Patrick Division
	GP	W	L	T	GF	GA	Pts
**Philadelphia Flyers**	80	51	13	16	348	209	118
**New York Islanders**	80	42	21	17	297	190	101
**Atlanta Flames**	80	35	33	12	262	237	82
New York Rangers	80	29	42	9	262	333	67

Note: GP = Games played, W = Wins, L = Losses, T = Ties, Pts = Points, GF = Goals for, GA = Goals against
Note: Teams that qualified for the playoffs are highlighted in bold.

=== Record vs. opponents ===
Patrick Division record vs. opponents

**Vs. Campbell Conference**

**Vs. Wales Conference**

**Vs. Patrick Division**

1975–76 NHL records
Team	**ATL**	**NYI**	**NYR**	**PHI**	**Total**
Atlanta	—	1–1–4	3–2–1	1–4–1	**5–7–6**
N.Y. Islanders	1–1–4	—	4–2	4–2	**9–5–4**
N.Y. Rangers	2–3–1	2–4	—	1–5	**5–12–1**
Philadelphia	4–1–1	2–4	5–1	—	**11–6–1**

**Vs. Smythe Division**

1975–76 NHL records
Team	**CHI**	**KCS**	**MIN**	**STL**	**VAN**	**Total**
Atlanta	2–2–1	5–0	4–1	1–3–1	3–0–2	**15–6–4**
N.Y. Islanders	3–1–1	2–0–3	4–1	4–0–1	0–3–2	**13–5–7**
N.Y. Rangers	2–0–3	4–1	4–1	3–2	3–1–1	**16–5–4**
Philadelphia	2–1–2	5–0	3–0–2	3–1–1	4–0–1	**17–2–6**

**Vs. Adams Division**

1975–76 NHL records
Team	**BOS**	**BUF**	**CAL**	**TOR**	**Total**
Atlanta	2–3	1–2–1	3–1	2–2	**8–8–1**
N.Y. Islanders	0–2–2	2–2	3–1	3–1–1	**8–6–3**
N.Y. Rangers	1–3	0–2–3	1–3	0–4	**2–12–3**
Philadelphia	1–2–1	3–0–1	4–0–1	3–0–1	**11–2–4**

**Vs. Norris Division**

1975–76 NHL records
Team	**DET**	**LAK**	**MTL**	**PIT**	**WSH**	**Total**
Atlanta	1–3	1–3	0–4	1–2–1	4–0	**7–12–1**
N.Y. Islanders	3–1	2–1–1	1–2–1	2–1–1	4–0	**12–5–3**
N.Y. Rangers	3–1	0–4	0–3–1	1–3	2–2	**6–13–1**
Philadelphia	2–2	2–0–2	2–1–1	3–0–1	3–0–1	**12–3–5**

== Playoffs ==
Heading into the playoffs, the Flyers squeaked past Toronto in seven games and defeated Boston in five games, game five featuring a five-goal outburst by Leach, the Riverton Rifle, to head to a third straight appearance in the Stanley Cup Final. However, the Flyers didn't come close to a third straight championship, as they ran into an up-and-coming dynasty in Montreal, and were swept in four straight games. Despite the loss, Leach was awarded the Conn Smythe Trophy for scoring 19 goals in 16 playoff games.

== Schedule and results ==
=== Regular season ===
1975–76 regular season
October: 7–1–2, 16 points (home: 5–0–0; road: 2–1–2)

Game	Date	Score	Opponent	Decision	Record	Points	Recap
1	October 9	5–4	Washington Capitals	Stephenson	1–0–0	2	W
2	October 11	9–5	@ Minnesota North Stars	Stephenson	2–0–0	4	W
3	October 12	4–1	California Golden Seals	Stephenson	3–0–0	6	W
4	October 16	3–2	St. Louis Blues	Stephenson	4–0–0	8	W
5	October 18	2–2	@ Montreal Canadiens	Stephenson	4–0–1	9	T
6	October 19	5–1	Detroit Red Wings	Stephenson	5–0–1	11	W
7	October 23	0–3	@ New York Islanders	Stephenson	5–1–1	11	L
8	October 25	4–4	@ Pittsburgh Penguins	Stephenson	5–1–2	12	T
9	October 26	7–2	@ New York Rangers	Stephenson	6–1–2	14	W
10	October 30	6–2	Toronto Maple Leafs	Stephenson	7–1–2	16	W

November: 9–2–4, 22 points (home: 8–1–2; road: 1–1–2)

Game	Date	Score	Opponent	Decision	Record	Points	Recap
11	November 1	8–1	Boston Bruins	Stephenson	8–1–2	18	W
12	November 2	10–0	Kansas City Scouts	Stephenson	9–1–2	20	W
13	November 5	4–4	@ Chicago Black Hawks	Stephenson	9–1–3	21	T
14	November 6	1–1	Los Angeles Kings	Stephenson	9–1–4	22	T
15	November 8	3–4	New York Islanders	Stephenson	9–2–4	22	L
16	November 9	6–4	Pittsburgh Penguins	Stephenson	10–2–4	24	W
17	November 12	3–1	@ Buffalo Sabres	Stephenson	11–2–4	26	W
18	November 13	5–5	Chicago Black Hawks	Stephenson	11–2–5	27	T
19	November 15	1–3	@ Detroit Red Wings	Stephenson	11–3–5	27	L
20	November 16	3–1	Montreal Canadiens	Stephenson	12–3–5	29	W
21	November 20	3–2	California Golden Seals	Stephenson	13–3–5	31	W
22	November 22	4–2	New York Rangers	Stephenson	14–3–5	33	W
23	November 26	7–3	Atlanta Flames	Stephenson	15–3–5	35	W
24	November 29	1–1	@ Toronto Maple Leafs	Stephenson	15–3–6	36	T
25	November 30	5–3	Vancouver Canucks	Stephenson	16–3–6	38	W

December: 6–3–2, 14 points (home: 3–1–0; road: 3–2–2)

Game	Date	Score	Opponent	Decision	Record	Points	Recap
26	December 4	5–2	Chicago Black Hawks	Stephenson	17–3–6	40	W
27	December 6	2–7	@ St. Louis Blues	Stephenson	17–4–6	40	L
28	December 7	6–1	Minnesota North Stars	Stephenson	18–4–6	42	W
29	December 10	1–1	@ California Golden Seals	Stephenson	18–4–7	43	T
30	December 13	6–4	@ Los Angeles Kings	Stephenson	19–4–7	45	W
31	December 17	4–2	@ Chicago Black Hawks	Stephenson	20–4–7	47	W
32	December 19	7–5	@ Washington Capitals	Stephenson	21–4–7	49	W
33	December 21	8–3	St. Louis Blues	Stephenson	22–4–7	51	W
34	December 23	2–2	@ Atlanta Flames	Stephenson	22–4–8	52	T
35	December 28	2–4	Boston Bruins	Stephenson	22–5–8	52	L
36	December 30	2–6	@ New York Islanders	Stephenson	22–6–8	52	L

January: 8–4–2, 18 points (home: 4–0–0; road: 4–4–2)

Game	Date	Score	Opponent	Decision	Record	Points	Recap
37	January 1	4–2	@ Kansas City Scouts	Taylor	23–6–8	54	W
38	January 3	8–4	@ Pittsburgh Penguins	Taylor	24–6–8	56	W
39	January 4	5–3	New York Islanders	Stephenson	25–6–8	58	W
40	January 7	7–3	@ Toronto Maple Leafs	Stephenson	26–6–8	60	W
41	January 8	6–4	Los Angeles Kings	Stephenson	27–6–8	62	W
—^{[a]}	January 11	4–1	HC CSKA Moscow	Stephenson			W
42	January 15	4–1	Pittsburgh Penguins	Stephenson	28–6–8	64	W
43	January 17	7–1	@ Kansas City Scouts	Taylor	29–6–8	66	W
44	January 18	0–2	@ Chicago Black Hawks	Stephenson	29–7–8	66	L
45	January 22	7–2	Atlanta Flames	Stephenson	30–7–8	68	W
46	January 24	3–5	@ Montreal Canadiens	Stephenson	30–8–8	68	L
47	January 25	3–5	@ Boston Bruins	Stephenson	30–9–8	68	L
48	January 27	4–8	@ Atlanta Flames	Taylor	30–10–8	68	L
49	January 29	1–1	@ Buffalo Sabres	Stephenson	30–10–9	69	T
50	January 31	3–3	@ Minnesota North Stars	Stephenson	30–10–10	70	T
Notes:^{a} The final game of the Super Series '76 exhibitions between eight NHL teams and two teams from the Soviet Championship League.

February: 10–0–4, 24 points (home: 7–0–1; road: 3–0–3)

Game	Date	Score	Opponent	Decision	Record	Points	Recap
51	February 5	6–1	Vancouver Canucks	Stephenson	31–10–10	72	W
52	February 7	8–2	St. Louis Blues	Stephenson	32–10–10	74	W
53	February 8	4–2	New York Islanders	Stephenson	33–10–10	76	W
54	February 12	6–1	New York Rangers	Stephenson	34–10–10	78	W
55	February 13	5–3	@ New York Rangers	Stephenson	35–10–10	80	W
56	February 15	2–1	Montreal Canadiens	Stephenson	36–10–10	82	W
57	February 17	2–2	Vancouver Canucks	Stephenson	36–10–11	83	T
58	February 18	6–4	@ Vancouver Canucks	Stephenson	37–10–11	85	W
59	February 20	5–4	@ California Golden Seals	Stephenson	38–10–11	87	W
60	February 21	3–3	@ Los Angeles Kings	Stephenson	38–10–12	88	T
61	February 24	5–5	@ Washington Capitals	Parent	38–10–13	89	T
62	February 26	3–2	Minnesota North Stars	Stephenson	39–10–13	91	W
63	February 28	2–2	@ St. Louis Blues	Stephenson	39–10–14	92	T
64	February 29	6–1	California Golden Seals	Stephenson	40–10–14	94	W

March: 9–2–2, 20 points (home: 7–0–0; road: 2–2–2)

Game	Date	Score	Opponent	Decision	Record	Points	Recap
65	March 4	6–1	@ Kansas City Scouts	Parent	41–10–14	96	W
66	March 6	6–1	Detroit Red Wings	Stephenson	42–10–14	98	W
67	March 7	4–1	Kansas City Scouts	Parent	43–10–14	100	W
68	March 11	6–1	Buffalo Sabres	Stephenson	44–10–14	102	W
69	March 14	6–1	Atlanta Flames	Parent	45–10–14	104	W
70	March 16	4–2	@ Atlanta Flames	Parent	46–10–14	106	W
71	March 18	3–2	Vancouver Canucks	Stephenson	47–10–14	108	W
72	March 20	2–4	@ Detroit Red Wings	Parent	47–11–14	108	L
73	March 21	4–2	Toronto Maple Leafs	Parent	48–11–14	110	W
74	March 23	3–3	@ Minnesota North Stars	Stephenson	48–11–15	111	T
75	March 25	4–1	New York Rangers	Inness	49–11–15	113	W
76	March 27	4–4	@ Boston Bruins	Parent	49–11–16	114	T
77	March 29	1–5	@ New York Islanders	Stephenson	49–12–16	114	L

April: 2–1–0, 4 points (home: 2–1–0; road: 0–0–0)

Game	Date	Score	Opponent	Decision	Record	Points	Recap
78	April 1	11–2	Washington Capitals	Inness	50–12–16	116	W
79	April 3	5–2	Buffalo Sabres	Parent	51–12–16	118	W
80	April 4	0–2	@ New York Rangers	Parent	51–13–16	118	L

Legend: W Win (2 points) L Loss (0 points) T Tie (1 point)

=== Playoffs ===
1976 Stanley Cup playoffs
Quarterfinals vs. Toronto Maple Leafs – Flyers win 4–3

Game	Date	Score	Opponent	Decision	Series	Recap
1	April 12	4–1	Toronto Maple Leafs	Parent	Flyers lead 1–0	W
2	April 13	3–1	Toronto Maple Leafs	Parent	Flyers lead 2–0	W
3	April 15	4–5	@ Toronto Maple Leafs	Parent	Flyers lead 2–1	L
4	April 17	2–4	@ Toronto Maple Leafs	Parent	Series tied 2–2	L
5	April 20	7–1	Toronto Maple Leafs	Parent	Flyers lead 3–2	W
6	April 22	5–8	@ Toronto Maple Leafs	Parent	Series tied 3–3	L
7	April 25	7–3	Toronto Maple Leafs	Parent	Flyers win 4–3	W

Semifinals vs. Boston Bruins – Flyers win 4–1

Game	Date	Score	Opponent	Decision	Series	Recap
1	April 27	2–4	Boston Bruins	Parent	Bruins lead 1–0	L
2	April 29	2–1 OT	Boston Bruins	Stephenson	Series tied 1–1	W
3	May 2	5–2	@ Boston Bruins	Stephenson	Flyers lead 2–1	W
4	May 4	4–2	@ Boston Bruins	Stephenson	Flyers lead 3–1	W
5	May 6	6–3	Boston Bruins	Stephenson	Flyers win 4–1	W

Stanley Cup Final vs. Montreal Canadiens – Canadiens win 4–0

Game	Date	Score	Opponent	Decision	Series	Recap
1	May 9	3–4	@ Montreal Canadiens	Stephenson	Canadiens lead 1–0	L
2	May 11	1–2	@ Montreal Canadiens	Stephenson	Canadiens lead 2–0	L
3	May 13	2–3	Montreal Canadiens	Stephenson	Canadiens lead 3–0	L
4	May 16	3–5	Montreal Canadiens	Stephenson	Canadiens win 4–0	L

Legend: W Win L Loss

== Player statistics ==
=== Scoring ===
- Position abbreviations: C = Center; D = Defense; G = Goaltender; LW = Left wing; RW = Right wing
- † = Joined team via a transaction (e.g., trade, waivers, signing) during the season. Stats reflect time with the Flyers only.
- ‡ = Left team via a transaction (e.g., trade, waivers, release) during the season. Stats reflect time with the Flyers only.

No.	Player	Pos	Regular season						Playoffs					
No.	Player	Pos	GP	G	A	Pts	+/-	PIM	GP	G	A	Pts	+/-	PIM
16	Bobby Clarke	C	76	30	89	119	83	136	16	2	14	16	11	28
7	Bill Barber	LW	80	50	62	112	74	104	16	6	7	13	9	18
27	Reggie Leach	RW	80	61	30	91	73	41	16	19	5	24	14	8
26	Orest Kindrachuk	C	76	26	49	75	32	101	16	4	7	11	3	4
12	Gary Dornhoefer	RW	74	28	35	63	14	128	16	3	4	7	0	43
10	Mel Bridgman	C	80	23	27	50	22	86	16	6	8	14	1	31
11	Don Saleski	RW	78	21	26	47	33	68	16	6	5	11	8	47
18	Ross Lonsberry	LW	80	19	28	47	29	87	16	4	3	7	−3	2
19	Rick MacLeish	C	51	22	23	45	6	16	—	—	—	—	—	—
5	Larry Goodenough	D	77	8	34	42	45	83	16	3	11	14	8	6
3	Tom Bladon	D	80	14	23	37	45	68	16	2	6	8	2	14
6	Andre Dupont	D	75	9	27	36	40	214	15	2	2	4	14	46
20	Jimmy Watson	D	79	2	34	36	65	66	16	1	8	9	11	6
8	Dave Schultz	LW	71	13	19	32	24	307	16	2	2	4	7	90
14	Joe Watson	D	78	2	22	24	56	28	16	1	1	2	−1	10
9	Bob Kelly	LW	79	12	8	20	3	125	16	0	2	2	1	44
15	Terry Crisp	C	38	6	9	15	6	28	10	0	5	5	4	2
2	Ed Van Impe‡	D	40	0	8	8	16	60	—	—	—	—	—	—
29	Jack McIlhargey	D	57	1	2	3	11	205	15	0	3	3	5	41
21	Larry Wright	C	2	1	0	1	1	0	—	—	—	—	—	—
17	Paul Holmgren	RW	1	0	0	0	0	2	—	—	—	—	—	—
30	Gary Inness†	G	2	0	0	0		0	—	—	—	—	—	—
33	Jerome Mrazek	G	1	0	0	0		0	—	—	—	—	—	—
25	Terry Murray	D	3	0	0	0	0	2	6	0	1	1	2	0
1	Bernie Parent	G	11	0	0	0		2	8	0	0	0		0
21	Bob Sirois‡	RW	1	0	0	0	0	0	—	—	—	—	—	—
35	Wayne Stephenson	G	66	0	0	0		11	8	0	0	0		0
30	Bobby Taylor‡	G	4	0	0	0		2	—	—	—	—	—	—

=== Goaltending ===
- † = Joined team via a transaction (e.g., trade, waivers, signing) during the season. Stats reflect time with the Flyers only.
- ‡ = Left team via a transaction (e.g., trade, waivers, release) during the season. Stats reflect time with the Flyers only.

No.	Player	Regular season											Playoffs									
No.	Player	GP	GS	W	L	T	SA	GA	GAA	SV%	SO	TOI	GP	GS	W	L	SA	GA	GAA	SV%	SO	TOI
35	Wayne Stephenson	66	64	40	10	14	1774	164	2.58	.908	1	3,811	8	8	4	4	228	22	2.69	.904	0	491
1	Bernie Parent	11	10	6	2	2	259	24	2.35	.907	0	614	8	8	4	4	250	27	3.40	.892	0	477
30	Bobby Taylor‡	4	4	3	1	0	125	15	3.75	.880	0	240	—	—	—	—	—	—	—	—	—	—
30	Gary Inness†	2	2	2	0	0	60	3	1.51	.950	0	120	—	—	—	—	—	—	—	—	—	—
33	Jerome Mrazek	1	0	0	0	0	2	1	9.55	.500	0	6	—	—	—	—	—	—	—	—	—	—

== Awards and records ==
=== Awards ===
Type	Award/honor	Recipient	Ref
League (annual)	Conn Smythe Trophy	Reggie Leach	
League (annual)	Hart Memorial Trophy	Bobby Clarke	
League (annual)	NHL first All-Star team	Bill Barber (Left wing)	
League (annual)	NHL first All-Star team	Bobby Clarke (Center)	
League (annual)	NHL second All-Star team	Reggie Leach (Right wing)	
League (in-season)	NHL All-Star Game selection	Bill Barber	
League (in-season)	NHL All-Star Game selection	Bobby Clarke (Note: Clarke did not play and was replaced by MacLeish.)	
League (in-season)	NHL All-Star Game selection	André Dupont	
League (in-season)	NHL All-Star Game selection	Reggie Leach	
League (in-season)	NHL All-Star Game selection	Rick MacLeish	
League (in-season)	NHL All-Star Game selection	Fred Shero (coach)	
League (in-season)	NHL All-Star Game selection	Wayne Stephenson	
League (in-season)	NHL All-Star Game selection	Jim Watson	
Team	Barry Ashbee Trophy	Jim Watson	
Miscellaneous	Lionel Conacher Award	Bobby Clarke	
Miscellaneous	Lou Marsh Trophy	Bobby Clarke	

=== Records ===
The LCB line of Reggie Leach, Bobby Clarke, and Bill Barber set a number of franchise records during the 1975–76 season. The trios combined totals of 141 goals and 322 points is the most by one Flyers line. Leach became the first Flyer to score 60 goals in a season, setting the high mark of 61. Clarke's 89 assists on the season tied his franchise record from the previous season and his 1.17 assists per game average is a franchise high. Clarke was one of two Flyers to set a record franchise streak, going twelve consecutive games with an assist from March 11 to April 3. The other was goaltender Wayne Stephenson's 14-game home winning streak from January 4 to March 18. Barber's 380 shots on goal set a franchise single season high. The team as a whole set the single season franchise records for most home wins (36, tied for the NHL record), fewest home losses (2), most points (118), and best points percentage (.738). Their 20 consecutive home wins from January 4 to April 3 is also a franchise record. During their April 1 game against the Washington Capitals, the Flyers recorded a franchise single game high 62 shots on goal.

The Flyers set a number of franchise records during their quarterfinal series against the Toronto Maple Leafs. During game three on April 15, the team recorded 30 penalties and 107 penalty minutes, including 17 penalties during the second period, all franchise playoffs highs. In game six on April 22, enforcer Dave Schultz set an NHL record with 42 penalty minutes in a single playoff game. Tom Bladon and Leach also combined to score the two fastest goals in only eight seconds during the second period. During the second period of game seven three days later, the Flyers scored five goals and set the team playoff records for the fastest three goals (1:21) and four goals (3:16), as well as the fastest two goals from the start of any period for one player (Mel Bridgman in 6:04). The Flyers recorded a franchise single series high 33 goals scored and 295 penalty minutes while Schultz set the NHL record with 116 penalty minutes during the series.

Conn Smythe Trophy winner Reggie Leach set or tied three NHL playoff records. His 19 goals scored during the playoffs is tied for the NHL record with Jari Kurri. He scored the first and only five-goal game in team history during the fifth and final game against the Boston Bruins on May 6, which is also tied for the NHL record with four other players. Leach's 10-game goal scoring streak from April 17 to May 9 is an NHL record and his 11-game point streak from April 15 to May 9 is a franchise record.

=== Milestones ===
Milestone	Player	Date	Ref
First game	Mel Bridgman	October 9, 1975	
First game	Jerome Mrazek	February 7, 1976	

=== Franchise firsts ===
Milestone	Player	Date	Ref
60-goal season	Reggie Leach	April 1, 1976	
5-goal game, playoffs	Reggie Leach	May 6, 1976	

== Transactions ==
The Flyers were involved in the following transactions from May 28, 1975, the day after the deciding game of the 1975 Stanley Cup Final, through May 16, 1976, the day of the deciding game of the 1976 Stanley Cup Final.

=== Trades ===
Date	Details		Ref
June 3, 1975	To Philadelphia Flyers: 1st-round pick in 1975	To Washington Capitals: Bill Clement; Don McLean; 1st-round pick in 1975	
December 15, 1975	To Philadelphia Flyers: Player to be named later (Note: The Capitals sent John Paddock to the Flyers on September 1, 1976, to complete trade.)	To Washington Capitals: Bob Sirois	
March 9, 1976	To Philadelphia Flyers: Gary Inness; Future considerations (Note: The Flyers later received the Penguins' 1977 8th, 9th, 10th, and 11th-round picks to complete the trade.)	To Pittsburgh Penguins: Bobby Taylor; Ed Van Impe	

=== Players acquired ===
Date	Player	Former team	Via	Ref
August 6, 1975	Dave Kelly	Providence College (HE)	Free agency	
September 10, 1975	Larry Wright	California Golden Seals	Free agency	
September 10, 1975	Wayne Schaab	Omaha Knights (CHL)	Free agency	
September 12, 1975	Terry Murray	California Golden Seals	Free agency	

=== Players lost ===
Date	Player	New team	Via	Ref
June 2, 1975	Ted Harris		Retirement	

=== Signings ===
Date	Player	Term	Ref
June 6, 1975	Mel Bridgman	5-year	
August 6, 1975	Bob Ritchie		
September 5, 1975	Dave Schultz	5-year	
September 16, 1975	Orest Kindrachuk	multi-year	
March 7, 1976	Paul Holmgren	multi-year	

== Draft picks ==
Philadelphia's picks at the 1975 NHL amateur draft, which was held at the NHL's office in Montreal, on June 3, 1975. The Flyers traded their second-round pick, 36th overall, along with the rights to Randy Andreachuk to the St. Louis Blues for Wayne Stephenson on September 16, 1974.

Round	Pick	Player	Position	Nationality	Team (league)	Notes
1	1	Mel Bridgman	Center	Canada	Victoria Cougars (WCHL)	(Note: The Flyers acquired the 1st overall pick from the Washington Capitals for Bill Clement, Don McLean and the Flyers' first-round pick, 18th overall, on June 3, 1975.)
3	54	Bob Ritchie	Left wing	Canada	Sorel Black Hawks (QMJHL)	
4	72	Rick St. Croix	Goaltender	Canada	Oshawa Generals (OHL)	
5	90	Gary Morrison	Forward	United States	University of Michigan (CCHA)	
6	108	Paul Holmgren	Forward	United States	University of Minnesota (WCHA)	
7	126	Dana Decker	Left wing	United States	Michigan Tech University (WCHA)	
9	160	Viktor Khatulev	Defense	Soviet Union	Dynamo Riga (USSR)	
10	175	Duffy Smith	Defense	Canada	Bowling Green State University (CCHA)	

== Farm teams ==
The Flyers were affiliated with the Richmond Robins of the AHL and the Philadelphia Firebirds of the NAHL.

== Cultural references ==
In The Simpsons Treehouse of Horror IV segment, The Devil and Homer Simpson, the starting lineup of the 1976 Philadelphia Flyers are included as members of the Devil's Jury of the Damned.
