= Dave Kelly (ice hockey, born 1952) =

Canadian ice hockey player

- Born: September 20, 1952 (age 73) Chatham, Ontario, Canada
- Height: 6 ft 2 in (188 cm)
- Weight: 205 lb (93 kg; 14 st 9 lb)
- Position: Right wing
- Shot: Right
- Played for: Detroit Red Wings
- NHL draft: Undrafted
- Playing career: 1975–1978

David Leslie Kelly (born September 20, 1952) is a Canadian former professional ice hockey winger who played in the National Hockey League (NHL). He played in 16 NHL games with the Detroit Red Wings during the 1976–77 season.

== Career statistics ==
=== Regular season and playoffs ===
			Regular season					Playoffs
Season	Team	League	GP	G	A	Pts	PIM	GP	G	A	Pts	PIM
1971–72	Providence College	NCAA	19	4	13	17	17	—	—	—	—	—
1972–73	Providence College	NCAA	22	11	12	23	54	—	—	—	—	—
1973–74	Providence College	NCAA	25	10	8	18	56	—	—	—	—	—
1974–75	Providence College	NCAA	27	21	22	43	66	—	—	—	—	—
1975–76	Richmond Robins	AHL	74	21	19	40	156	8	3	4	7	19
1976–77	Springfield Indians	AHL	3	0	1	1	0	—	—	—	—	—
1976–77	Rhode Island Reds	AHL	45	16	19	35	95	—	—	—	—	—
1976–77	Detroit Red Wings	NHL	16	2	0	2	4	—	—	—	—	—
1976–77	Kansas City Blades	CHL	—	—	—	—	—	10	4	1	5	6
1977–78	Philadelphia Firebirds	AHL	74	15	23	38	89	4	3	2	5	2
NHL totals			16	2	0	2	4	—	—	—	—	—
AHL totals			196	52	62	114	340	12	6	6	12	21
