= Jerome Mrazek =

Canadian ice hockey player

- Born: October 15, 1951 (age 75) Prince Albert, Saskatchewan, Canada
- Died: February 11, 2026
- Height: 5 ft 9 in (175 cm)
- Weight: 160 lb (73 kg; 11 st 6 lb)
- Position: Goaltender
- Caught: Left
- Played for: Philadelphia Flyers
- NHL draft: 106th overall, 1971; Philadelphia Flyers
- Playing career: 1974–1978

Jerome John Mrazek (born October 15, 1951 - February 11, 2026 ) was a Canadian former professional ice hockey goaltender who played in one NHL game for the Philadelphia Flyers during the 1975–76 season, on February 7, 1976 against the St. Louis Blues. He played for three seasons with the University of Minnesota-Duluth. He also played in the IHL and AHL from 1974 to 1978.

== Career statistics ==
=== Regular season and playoffs ===
			Regular season									Playoffs
Season	Team	League	GP	W	L	T	MIN	GA	SO	GAA	SV%	GP	W	L	MIN	GA	SO	GAA	SV%
1967–68	Moose Jaw Canucks	WCHL	4	—	—	—	130	7	0	3.23	—	—	—	—	—	—	—	—	—
1968–69	Moose Jaw Canucks	WCHL	—	—	—	—	—	—	—	—	—	—	—	—	—	—	—	—	—
1969–70	Moose Jaw Canucks	WCHL	31	—	—	—	1829	125	0	4.10	—	—	—	—	—	—	—	—	—
1969–70	Weyburn Red Wings	M-Cup	—	—	—	—	—	—	—	—	—	21	12	9	1217	76	1	3.75	—
1970–71	University of Minnesota-Duluth	WCHA	4	2	1	0	200	17	0	5.10	—	—	—	—	—	—	—	—	—
1971–72	University of Minnesota-Duluth	WCHA	27	12	13	1	1590	114	0	4.30	—	—	—	—	—	—	—	—	—
1972–73	University of Minnesota-Duluth	WCHA	27	14	13	0	1608	119	0	4.44	—	—	—	—	—	—	—	—	—
1973–74	University of Minnesota-Duluth	WCHA	29	17	12	0	1729	115	1	3.99	—	—	—	—	—	—	—	—	—
1974–75	Des Moines Capitols	IHL	50	—	—	—	2787	154	2	3.32	—	5	2	3	311	13	0	2.51	—
1975–76	Philadelphia Flyers	NHL	1	0	0	0	7	1	0	9.55	.500	—	—	—	—	—	—	—	—
1975–76	Richmond Robins	AHL	20	5	9	4	1135	72	2	3.81	—	5	3	2	289	14	0	2.91	—
1976–77	Springfield Indians	AHL	33	—	—	—	1685	151	0	5.38	.858	—	—	—	—	—	—	—	—
1976–77	Hershey Bears	AHL	10	—	—	—	537	38	0	4.24	.887	6	2	4	358	21	0	3.52	—
1977–78	Maine Mariners	AHL	27	12	10	4	1488	80	3	3.33	.888	—	—	—	—	—	—	—	—
1977–78	Hershey Bears	AHL	14	2	10	1	831	67	0	4.84	.888	—	—	—	—	—	—	—	—
NHL totals			1	0	0	0	7	1	0	9.55	.500	—	—	—	—	—	—	—	—

== See also ==
- List of players who played only one game in the NHL
