= 1975–76 New York Rangers season =

NHL hockey team season

1975–76 New York Rangers
- Division: 4th Patrick
- Conference: 7th Campbell
- 1975–76 record: 29–42–9
- Home record: 16–16–8
- Road record: 13–26–1
- Goals for: 262
- Goals against: 333

Team information
- General manager: Emile Francis; John Ferguson
- Coach: Ron Stewart; John Ferguson Sr.
- Captain: Phil Esposito
- Alternate captains: None
- Arena: Madison Square Garden

Team leaders
- Goals: Rod Gilbert (36)
- Assists: Rod Gilbert (50)
- Points: Rod Gilbert (86)
- Penalty minutes: Carol Vadnais (104)
- Wins: John Davidson (22)
- Goals against average: John Davidson (3.97)

The 1975–76 New York Rangers season was the franchise's 50th season. The Rangers would finish in fourth in the Patrick Division and miss the playoffs for the first time since the 1965–66 season.

== Offseason ==
The Rangers chose Wayne Dillon as their first pick in the 1975 draft. Dillon was already playing professionally with the Toronto Toros of the World Hockey Association.

== Regular season ==
On November 7, 1975, the New York Rangers pulled off a blockbuster trade with the Boston Bruins, exchanging Brad Park, Jean Ratelle and Joe Zanussi for Phil Esposito and Carol Vadnais.

=== Final standings ===
Patrick Division
	GP	W	L	T	GF	GA	Pts
**Philadelphia Flyers**	80	51	13	16	348	209	118
**New York Islanders**	80	42	21	17	297	190	101
**Atlanta Flames**	80	35	33	12	262	237	82
New York Rangers	80	29	42	9	262	333	67

Note: GP = Games played, W = Wins, L = Losses, T = Ties, Pts = Points, GF = Goals for, GA = Goals against
Note: Teams that qualified for the playoffs are highlighted in bold.

=== Record vs. opponents ===
Patrick Division record vs. opponents

**Vs. Campbell Conference**

**Vs. Wales Conference**

**Vs. Patrick Division**

1975–76 NHL records
Team	**ATL**	**NYI**	**NYR**	**PHI**	**Total**
Atlanta	—	1–1–4	3–2–1	1–4–1	**5–7–6**
N.Y. Islanders	1–1–4	—	4–2	4–2	**9–5–4**
N.Y. Rangers	2–3–1	2–4	—	1–5	**5–12–1**
Philadelphia	4–1–1	2–4	5–1	—	**11–6–1**

**Vs. Smythe Division**

1975–76 NHL records
Team	**CHI**	**KCS**	**MIN**	**STL**	**VAN**	**Total**
Atlanta	2–2–1	5–0	4–1	1–3–1	3–0–2	**15–6–4**
N.Y. Islanders	3–1–1	2–0–3	4–1	4–0–1	0–3–2	**13–5–7**
N.Y. Rangers	2–0–3	4–1	4–1	3–2	3–1–1	**16–5–4**
Philadelphia	2–1–2	5–0	3–0–2	3–1–1	4–0–1	**17–2–6**

**Vs. Adams Division**

1975–76 NHL records
Team	**BOS**	**BUF**	**CAL**	**TOR**	**Total**
Atlanta	2–3	1–2–1	3–1	2–2	**8–8–1**
N.Y. Islanders	0–2–2	2–2	3–1	3–1–1	**8–6–3**
N.Y. Rangers	1–3	0–2–3	1–3	0–4	**2–12–3**
Philadelphia	1–2–1	3–0–1	4–0–1	3–0–1	**11–2–4**

**Vs. Norris Division**

1975–76 NHL records
Team	**DET**	**LAK**	**MTL**	**PIT**	**WSH**	**Total**
Atlanta	1–3	1–3	0–4	1–2–1	4–0	**7–12–1**
N.Y. Islanders	3–1	2–1–1	1–2–1	2–1–1	4–0	**12–5–3**
N.Y. Rangers	3–1	0–4	0–3–1	1–3	2–2	**6–13–1**
Philadelphia	2–2	2–0–2	2–1–1	3–0–1	3–0–1	**12–3–5**

== Schedule and results ==
1975–76 regular season
October: 4–5–1 (home: 3–2–1; road: 1–3–0)

Game	October	Opponent	Score	Record
1	8	Chicago Black Hawks	2–2	0–0–1
2	10	@ Atlanta Flames	2–1	1–0–1
3	12	Los Angeles Kings	6–4	1–1–1
4	15	Atlanta Flames	3–1	2–1–1
5	18	@ Toronto Maple Leafs	4–1	2–2–1
6	19	Vancouver Canucks	8–1	3–2–1
7	22	@ Buffalo Sabres	9–1	3–3–1
8	25	@ New York Islanders	7–1	3–4–1
9	26	Philadelphia Flyers	7–2	3–5–1
10	29	St. Louis Blues	3–1	4–5–1

November: 5–9–1 (home: 3–3–1; road: 2–6–1)

Game	November	Opponent	Score	Record
11	1	@ Montreal Canadiens	4–0	4–6–1
12	2	Detroit Red Wings	6–4	4–7–1
13	4	@ Vancouver Canucks	4–2	5–7–1
14	7	@ California Golden Seals	7–5	5–8–1
15	8	@ Los Angeles Kings	3–1	5–9–1
16	11	@ St. Louis Blues	5–3	5–10–1
17	12	Chicago Black Hawks	4–4	5–10–2
18	15	@ Minnesota North Stars	5–2	6–10–2
19	16	Detroit Red Wings	3–0	7–10–2
20	19	Kansas City Scouts	6–4	7–11–2
21	22	@ Philadelphia Flyers	4–2	7–12–2
22	23	California Golden Seals	3–2	8–12–2
23	26	Boston Bruins	6–4	8–13–2
24	29	@ Pittsburgh Penguins	8–3	8–14–2
25	30	St. Louis Blues	5–2	9–14–2

December: 6–4–2 (home: 3–3–1; road: 3–1–1)

Game	December	Opponent	Score	Record
26	4	@ Buffalo Sabres	6–6	9–14–3
27	5	@ Kansas City Scouts	3–2	10–14–3
28	7	Washington Capitals	5–2	11–14–3
29	10	Buffalo Sabres	2–2	11–14–4
30	11	@ Boston Bruins	5–1	12–14–4
31	13	@ Detroit Red Wings	5–2	13–14–4
32	14	Toronto Maple Leafs	6–1	13–15–4
33	17	New York Islanders	3–0	13–16–4
34	19	@ Atlanta Flames	8–3	13–17–4
35	21	Minnesota North Stars	2–0	14–17–4
36	23	Pittsburgh Penguins	4–3	15–17–4
37	31	Atlanta Flames	8–1	15–18–4

January: 3–8–2 (home: 0–2–2; road: 3–6–0)

Game	January	Opponent	Score	Record
38	4	Toronto Maple Leafs	8–6	15–19–4
39	6	@ St. Louis Blues	5–2	15–20–4
40	10	@ Kansas City Scouts	8–4	16–20–4
41	11	@ Chicago Black Hawks	6–2	17–20–4
42	14	@ Vancouver Canucks	5–1	17–21–4
43	16	@ California Golden Seals	7–0	17–22–4
44	18	@ Pittsburgh Penguins	8–3	17–23–4
45	21	Chicago Black Hawks	3–3	17–23–5
46	23	@ Washington Capitals	7–5	17–24–5
47	25	Los Angeles Kings	4–1	17–25–5
48	28	Buffalo Sabres	3–3	17–25–6
49	29	@ St. Louis Blues	6–3	18–25–6
50	31	@ Toronto Maple Leafs	6–4	18–26–6

February: 5–8–1 (home: 3–5–1; road: 2–3–0)

Game	February	Opponent	Score	Record
51	1	Minnesota North Stars	3–2	19–26–6
52	4	New York Islanders	6–5	19–27–6
53	7	@ Detroit Red Wings	5–4	20–27–6
54	8	Montreal Canadiens	3–0	20–28–6
55	12	@ Philadelphia Flyers	6–1	20–29–6
56	13	Philadelphia Flyers	5–3	20–30–6
57	15	Kansas City Scouts	5–1	21–30–6
58	17	@ New York Islanders	3–1	22–30–6
59	18	Washington Capitals	11–4	23–30–6
60	20	@ Montreal Canadiens	5–3	23–31–6
61	22	Boston Bruins	5–2	23–32–6
62	25	California Golden Seals	6–4	23–33–6
63	28	@ Minnesota North Stars	5–3	23–34–6
64	29	Montreal Canadiens	1–1	23–34–7

March: 5–7–2 (home: 3–1–2; road: 2–6–0)

Game	March	Opponent	Score	Record
65	3	Vancouver Canucks	3–3	23–34–8
66	5	@ Atlanta Flames	8–3	23–35–8
67	7	Atlanta Flames	6–6	23–35–9
68	11	@ Los Angeles Kings	4–3	23–36–9
69	13	@ Vancouver Canucks	7–3	24–36–9
70	16	@ Washington Capitals	5–2	24–37–9
71	17	Minnesota North Stars	3–1	25–37–9
72	20	@ Boston Bruins	8–1	25–38–9
73	21	Pittsburgh Penguins	4–2	25–39–9
74	24	@ Buffalo Sabres	7–3	25–40–9
75	25	@ Philadelphia Flyers	4–1	25–41–9
76	27	@ Chicago Black Hawks	6–5	26–41–9
77	28	Kansas City Scouts	4–2	27–41–9
78	31	New York Islanders	3–1	28–41–9

April: 1–1–0 (home: 1–0–0; road: 0–1–0)

Game	April	Opponent	Score	Record
79	3	@ New York Islanders	10–2	28–42–9
80	4	Philadelphia Flyers	2–0	29–42–9

Legend: Win (2 points) Loss (0 points) Tie (1 point)

== Player statistics ==
Skaters

Regular season
Player	GP	G	A	Pts	+/-	PIM
Rod Gilbert	70	36	50	86	−8	32
Steve Vickers	80	30	53	83	−17	40
Phil Esposito^{†}	62	29	38	67	−39	28
Rick Middleton	77	24	26	50	−38	14
Carol Vadnais^{†}	64	20	30	50	−17	104
Wayne Dillon	79	21	24	45	−11	10
Pete Stemkowski	75	13	28	41	−7	49
Greg Polis	79	15	21	36	−8	77
Pat Hickey	70	14	22	36	−29	36
Walt Tkaczuk	78	8	28	36	−10	56
Bill Fairbairn	80	13	15	28	−14	8
Ron Greschner	77	6	21	27	−51	93
Gilles Marotte	57	4	17	21	−3	34
Jean Ratelle^{‡}	13	5	10	15	2	2
Larry Sacharuk	42	6	7	13	−14	14
Jerry Holland	36	7	4	11	−5	6
John Bednarski	59	1	8	9	−15	77
Nick Beverley	63	1	8	9	−9	46
Bill Collins	50	4	4	8	−19	38
Brad Park^{‡}	13	2	4	6	−4	23
Dave Maloney	21	1	3	4	−7	66
Doug Jarrett	45	0	4	4	−26	19
Ed Johnstone	10	2	1	3	4	4
Ron Harris	3	0	1	1	−1	0
Greg Holst	2	0	0	0	−3	0
Derek Sanderson^{‡}	8	0	0	0	−8	4
Dale Lewis	8	0	0	0	−2	0

Goaltenders

Regular season
Player	GP	TOI	W	L	T	GA	GAA	SO
John Davidson	56	3207	22	28	5	212	3.97	3
Dunc Wilson	20	1080	5	9	3	76	4.22	0
Doug Soetaert	8	273	2	2	0	24	5.27	0
Ed Giacomin^{‡}	4	240	0	3	1	19	4.75	0

Mike Ralph dressed for 6 games from Jan 6th 1976 to Jan 18th 1976. All six were away games.
^{†}Denotes player spent time with another team before joining Rangers. Stats reflect time with Rangers only.
^{‡}Traded mid-season. Stats reflect time with Rangers only.

Note:

Pos = Position;GP = Games played; G = Goals; A = Assists; Pts = Points; PIM = Penalty minutes; +/- = Plus/minus; PPG = Power-play goals; SHG = Short-handed goals; GWG = Game-winning goals
Pos = Position;GP = Games played; Min, TOI = Minutes played; W = Wins; L = Losses; T,T/OT = Ties; OTL = Overtime losses; GA = Goals-against; GAA = Goals-against average; SO = Shutouts; SA = Shots against; SV = Shots saved;SV% = Save percentage;

== Awards and records ==
- Bill Masterton Memorial Trophy: Rod Gilbert
- Lady Byng Memorial Trophy: Jean Ratelle

== Transactions ==
- June 17, 1975 – Hartland Monahan was lost in intra-league draft to Washington Capitals.
- June 17, 1975 – Dale Lewis claimed in intra-league draft from Los Angeles Kings.
- June 18, 1975 – Ted Irvine, Bert Wilson and Jerry Butler traded to St. Louis Blues for John Davidson and Bill Collins.
- September 9, 1975 – Curt Ridley traded to Atlanta Flames for Jerry Byers.
- September 20, 1975 – Bob MacMillan, future consideration and cash went to the St. Louis Blues for Larry Sacharuk.
- October 28, 1975 – Gilles Villemure traded to Chicago Blackhawks for Doug Jarrett.
- October 30, 1975 – Derek Sanderson traded to St. Louis Blues for 1977 first-round pick.
- October 31, 1975 – Ed Giacomin was picked up on waivers by the Detroit Red Wings.
- November 7, 1975 – Brad Park, Jean Ratelle and Joe Zanussi traded to Boston Bruins for Phil Esposito and Carol Vadnais.
- November 14, 1975 – Al Simmons picked up for cash from the Boston Bruins.

Source: – "Search Results". hockeytransactions.com.

== Draft picks ==
New York's picks at the 1975 NHL amateur draft in Montreal, Canada.

Round	#	Player	Position	Nationality	College/Junior/Club team (League)
1	12	Wayne Dillon	C	Canada	Toronto Toros (WHA)
2	30	Doug Soetaert	G	Canada	Edmonton Oil Kings (WCHL)
3	48	Greg Hickey	LW	Canada	Hamilton Fincups (OHA)
4	66	Bill Cheropita	G	Canada	St. Catharines Black Hawks (OHA)
5	84	Larry Huras	D	Canada	Kitchener Rangers (OHA)
6	102	Randy Koch	LW	United States	University of Vermont (NCAA)
7	120	Claude Larose	LW	Canada	Sherbrooke Beavers (QMJHL)
8	138	Bill Hamilton	C	Canada	St. Catharines Black Hawks (OHA)
9	154	Bud Stefanski	C	Canada	Oshawa Generals (OHA)
10	169	Daniel Beaulieu	LW	Canada	Quebec Remparts (QMJHL)
11	184	John McMorrow	C	United States	Providence College (NCAA)
12	195	Tom McNamara	G	United States	University of Vermont (NCAA)
13	200	Steve Roberts	D	United States	Providence College (NCAA)
13	201	Paul Dionne	D	Canada	Princeton University (NCAA)
14	205	Cecil Luckern	LW	United States	University of New Hampshire (NCAA)
15	209	John Corriveau	RW	United States	University of New Hampshire (NCAA)
16	212	Tom Funke	LW	United States	Fargo-Moorhead Sugar Kings (MidJHL)

== See also ==
- 1975–76 NHL season
