= 1975–76 Montreal Canadiens season =

NHL hockey team season (19th Stanley Cup win)

1975–76 Montreal Canadiens
- Stanley Cup champions
- Wales Conference champions
- Norris Division champions
- Division: 1st Norris
- Conference: 1st Wales
- 1975–76 record: 58–11–11
- Home record: 32–3–5
- Road record: 26–8–6
- Goals for: 337
- Goals against: 174

Team information
- General manager: Sam Pollock
- Coach: Scotty Bowman
- Captain: Yvan Cournoyer
- Alternate captains: None
- Arena: Montreal Forum

Team leaders
- Goals: Guy Lafleur (56)
- Assists: Pete Mahovlich (71)
- Points: Guy Lafleur (125)
- Penalty minutes: Doug Risebrough (180)
- Wins: Ken Dryden (42)
- Goals against average: Ken Dryden (2.03)

The 1975–76 Montreal Canadiens season was the club's 67th season. The Canadiens won their 19th Stanley Cup in club history. In addition to the regular NHL schedule, the Canadiens played an exhibition game against the powerful Soviet Red Army team, recording a 3–3 tie.

== Regular season ==
Henri Richard's number 16 was retired December 10, 1975, by the Canadiens in his honour.

=== Final standings ===
Norris Division
	GP	W	L	T	GF	GA	Pts
**Montreal Canadiens**	80	58	11	11	337	174	127
**Los Angeles Kings**	80	38	33	9	263	265	85
**Pittsburgh Penguins**	80	35	33	12	339	303	82
Detroit Red Wings	80	26	44	10	226	300	62
Washington Capitals	80	11	59	10	224	394	32

Note: GP = Games played, W = Wins, L = Losses, T = Ties, Pts = Points, GF = Goals for, GA = Goals against

Note: Teams that qualified for the playoffs are highlighted in bold.

=== Record vs. opponents ===
Norris Division record vs. opponents

**Vs. Wales Conference**

**Vs. Campbell Conference**

**Vs. Norris Division**

1975–76 NHL records
Team	**DET**	**LAK**	**MTL**	**PIT**	**WSH**	**Total**
Detroit	—	2–3–1	0–5–1	1–4–1	3–3	**6–15–3**
Los Angeles	3–2–1	—	2–3–1	1–5	4–1–1	**10–11–3**
Montreal	5–0–1	3–2–1	—	6–0	6–0	**20–2–2**
Pittsburgh	4–1–1	5–1	0–6	—	4–1–1	**13–9–2**
Washington	3–3	1–4–1	0–6	1–4–1	—	**5–17–2**

**Vs. Adams Division**

1975–76 NHL records
Team	**BOS**	**BUF**	**CAL**	**TOR**	**Total**
Detroit	0–3–2	1–4	1–3–1	1–2–2	**3–12–5**
Los Angeles	1–4	2–3	3–2	1–3–1	**7–12–1**
Montreal	3–0–2	3–2	5–0	3–1–1	**14–3–3**
Pittsburgh	0–3–2	1–4	2–2–1	4–1	**7–10–3**
Washington	0–4–1	0–4–1	1–3–1	0–4–1	**1–15–4**

**Vs. Patrick Division**

1975–76 NHL records
Team	**ATL**	**NYI**	**NYR**	**PHI**	**Total**
Detroit	3–1	1–3	1–3	2–2	**7–9**
Los Angeles	3–1	1–2–1	4–0	0–2–2	**8–5–3**
Montreal	4–0	2–1–1	3–0–1	1–2–1	**10–3–3**
Pittsburgh	2–1–1	1–2–1	3–1	0–3–1	**6–7–3**
Washington	0–4	0–4	2–2	0–3–1	**2–13–1**

**Vs. Smythe Division**

1975–76 NHL records
Team	**CHI**	**KCS**	**MIN**	**STL**	**VAN**	**Total**
Detroit	2–1–1	3–1	3–1	2–1–1	0–4	**10–8–2**
Los Angeles	2–2	4–0	2–1–1	2–1–1	3–1	**13–5–2**
Montreal	2–1–1	3–1	4–0	4–0	1–1–2	**14–3–3**
Pittsburgh	1–2–1	2–1–1	2–1–1	2–2	2–1–1	**9–7–4**
Washington	2–2	1–2–1	0–2–2	0–4	0–4	**3–14–3**

== Schedule and results ==
1975–76 regular season
October

Game	Result	Date	Score	Opponent	Record
1	W	October 8, 1975	9–0	Los Angeles Kings (1975–76)	1–0–0
2	W	October 9, 1975	9–4	@ Boston Bruins (1975–76)	2–0–0
3	W	October 11, 1975	7–2	St. Louis Blues (1975–76)	3–0–0
4	L	October 14, 1975	3–5	@ New York Islanders (1975–76)	3–1–0
5	T	October 18, 1975	2–2	Philadelphia Flyers (1975–76)	3–1–1
6	W	October 21, 1975	7–1	@ Pittsburgh Penguins (1975–76)	4–1–1
7	W	October 22, 1975	4–1	@ Detroit Red Wings (1975–76)	5–1–1
8	W	October 25, 1975	6–2	Boston Bruins (1975–76)	6–1–1
9	T	October 27, 1975	4–4	New York Islanders (1975–76)	6–1–2
10	L	October 29, 1975	1–2	@ Chicago Black Hawks (1975–76)	6–2–2

November

Game	Result	Date	Score	Opponent	Record
11	W	November 1, 1975	4–0	New York Rangers (1975–76)	7–2–2
12	W	November 3, 1975	3–2	Buffalo Sabres (1975–76)	8–2–2
13	W	November 5, 1975	3–1	@ Atlanta Flames (1975–76)	9–2–2
14	W	November 8, 1975	5–0	Detroit Red Wings (1975–76)	10–2–2
15	L	November 9, 1975	1–5	@ Buffalo Sabres (1975–76)	10–3–2
16	W	November 11, 1975	6–0	Minnesota North Stars (1975–76)	11–3–2
17	W	November 13, 1975	5–4	@ Pittsburgh Penguins (1975–76)	12–3–2
18	T	November 15, 1975	4–4	Chicago Black Hawks (1975–76)	12–3–3
19	L	November 16, 1975	1–3	@ Philadelphia Flyers (1975–76)	12–4–3
20	W	November 19, 1975	6–0	@ Minnesota North Stars (1975–76)	13–4–3
21	W	November 22, 1975	4–2	@ Toronto Maple Leafs (1975–76)	14–4–3
22	W	November 25, 1975	4–0	@ Atlanta Flames (1975–76)	15–4–3
23	W	November 27, 1975	2–1	@ New York Islanders (1975–76)	16–4–3
24	W	November 29, 1975	6–4	Vancouver Canucks (1975–76)	17–4–3
25	W	November 30, 1975	3–2	New York Islanders (1975–76)	18–4–3

December

Game	Result	Date	Score	Opponent	Record
26	L	December 3, 1975	5–6	@ Kansas City Scouts (1975–76)	18–5–3
27	W	December 4, 1975	4–1	@ St. Louis Blues (1975–76)	19–5–3
28	W	December 6, 1975	9–3	Washington Capitals (1975–76)	20–5–3
29	T	December 7, 1975	2–2	@ Boston Bruins (1975–76)	20–5–4
30	T	December 10, 1975	3–3	Toronto Maple Leafs (1975–76)	20–5–5
31	W	December 13, 1975	4–1	Kansas City Scouts (1975–76)	21–5–5
32	W	December 14, 1975	7–4	Pittsburgh Penguins (1975–76)	22–5–5
33	W	December 17, 1975	2–1	@ Los Angeles Kings (1975–76)	23–5–5
34	T	December 20, 1975	2–2	@ Vancouver Canucks (1975–76)	23–5–6
35	W	December 21, 1975	2–1	@ California Golden Seals (1975–76)	24–5–6
36	W	December 27, 1975	2–1	Minnesota North Stars (1975–76)	25–5–6
37	W	December 29, 1975	6–0	@ Washington Capitals (1975–76)	26–5–6

January

Game	Result	Date	Score	Opponent	Record
38	W	January 3, 1976	7–0	Washington Capitals (1975–76)	27–5–6
39	L	January 5, 1976	2–4	Buffalo Sabres (1975–76)	27–6–6
40	W	January 7, 1976	2–1	@ Minnesota North Stars (1975–76)	28–6–6
41	W	January 10, 1976	7–1	Detroit Red Wings (1975–76)	29–6–6
42	W	January 11, 1976	2–0	Toronto Maple Leafs (1975–76)	30–6–6
43	W	January 13, 1976	3–2	@ Washington Capitals (1975–76)	31–6–6
44	W	January 17, 1976	4–2	Los Angeles Kings (1975–76)	32–6–6
45	W	January 18, 1976	4–2	Atlanta Flames (1975–76)	33–6–6
46	W	January 22, 1976	4–3	@ Pittsburgh Penguins (1975–76)	34–6–6
47	W	January 24, 1976	5–3	Philadelphia Flyers (1975–76)	35–6–6
48	T	January 25, 1976	3–3	@ Detroit Red Wings (1975–76)	35–6–7
49	T	January 27, 1976	2–2	@ Vancouver Canucks (1975–76)	35–6–8
50	W	January 30, 1976	5–4	@ California Golden Seals (1975–76)	36–6–8
51	L	January 31, 1976	3–7	@ Los Angeles Kings (1975–76)	36–7–8

February

Game	Result	Date	Score	Opponent	Record
52	W	February 4, 1976	8–3	Chicago Black Hawks (1975–76)	37–7–8
53	W	February 6, 1976	7–1	California Golden Seals (1975–76)	38–7–8
54	W	February 8, 1976	3–0	@ New York Rangers (1975–76)	39–7–8
55	W	February 10, 1976	6–1	St. Louis Blues (1975–76)	40–7–8
56	L	February 12, 1976	4–6	Vancouver Canucks (1975–76)	40–8–8
57	T	February 14, 1976	2–2	Los Angeles Kings (1975–76)	40–8–9
58	L	February 15, 1976	1–2	@ Philadelphia Flyers (1975–76)	40–9–9
59	W	February 18, 1976	7–5	@ Toronto Maple Leafs (1975–76)	41–9–9
60	W	February 20, 1976	5–3	New York Rangers (1975–76)	42–9–9
61	W	February 22, 1976	4–2	@ Buffalo Sabres (1975–76)	43–9–9
62	W	February 24, 1976	6–2	@ St. Louis Blues (1975–76)	44–9–9
63	W	February 25, 1976	3–1	@ Kansas City Scouts (1975–76)	45–9–9
64	W	February 28, 1976	3–2	Atlanta Flames (1975–76)	46–9–9
65	T	February 29, 1976	1–1	@ New York Rangers (1975–76)	46–9–10

March

Game	Result	Date	Score	Opponent	Record
66	W	March 3, 1976	4–2	California Golden Seals (1975–76)	47–9–10
67	W	March 6, 1976	3–2	Buffalo Sabres (1975–76)	48–9–10
68	W	March 7, 1976	6–1	@ Detroit Red Wings (1975–76)	49–9–10
69	W	March 10, 1976	5–1	@ Chicago Black Hawks (1975–76)	50–9–10
70	W	March 13, 1976	4–2	Boston Bruins (1975–76)	51–9–10
71	W	March 14, 1976	5–1	Washington Capitals (1975–76)	52–9–10
72	W	March 16, 1976	5–4	Pittsburgh Penguins (1975–76)	53–9–10
73	W	March 19, 1976	4–1	@ California Golden Seals (1975–76)	54–9–10
74	L	March 20, 1976	3–4	@ Los Angeles Kings (1975–76)	54–10–10
75	L	March 24, 1976	1–2	Toronto Maple Leafs (1975–76)	54–11–10
76	W	March 27, 1976	8–2	Kansas City Scouts (1975–76)	55–11–10
77	T	March 28, 1976	2–2	@ Boston Bruins (1975–76)	55–11–11
78	W	March 31, 1976	7–3	Pittsburgh Penguins (1975–76)	56–11–11

April

Game	Result	Date	Score	Opponent	Record
79	W	April 3, 1976	6–3	Detroit Red Wings (1975–76)	57–11–11
80	W	April 4, 1976	4–3	@ Washington Capitals (1975–76)	58–11–11

Legend: Win (2 points) Loss (0 points) Tie (1 point)

== Player statistics ==
=== Regular season ===
==== Scoring ====
= Indicates league leader

Player	Pos	GP	G	A	Pts	PIM	+/-	PPG	SHG	GWG
Guy Lafleur	RW	80	56	69	125	36	68	18	0	12
Pete Mahovlich	C	80	34	71	105	76	71	8	1	7
Steve Shutt	LW	80	45	34	79	47	73	7	0	7
Yvan Cournoyer	RW	71	32	36	68	20	37	8	0	12
Guy Lapointe	D	77	21	47	68	78	64	8	1	1
Yvon Lambert	LW	80	32	35	67	28	10	12	0	4
Jacques Lemaire	C	61	20	32	52	20	26	6	0	3
Serge Savard	D	71	8	39	47	38	52	1	1	1
Doug Risebrough	C	80	16	28	44	180	18	1	0	3
Larry Robinson	D	80	10	30	40	59	50	2	0	0
Murray Wilson	LW	59	11	24	35	36	25	2	1	1
Doug Jarvis	C	80	5	30	35	16	17	0	1	1
Bob Gainey	LW	78	15	13	28	57	20	1	2	1
Mario Tremblay	RW	71	11	16	27	88	5	1	0	2
Jim Roberts	D/RW	74	13	8	21	35	7	0	0	1
John Van Boxmeer	D	46	6	11	17	31	17	0	0	1
Pierre Bouchard	D	66	1	11	12	50	20	0	0	1
Don Awrey	D	72	0	12	12	29	30	0	0	0
Rick Chartraw	D/RW	16	1	3	4	25	12	0	0	0
Bill Nyrop	D	19	0	3	3	8	21	0	0	0
Ken Dryden	G	62	0	2	2	0	0	0	0	0
Michel Larocque	G	22	0	2	2	4	0	0	0	0
Ron Andruff	C	1	0	0	0	0	0	0	0	0
Glenn Goldup	RW	3	0	0	0	2	−1	0	0	0
Sean Shanahan	C/RW	4	0	0	0	0	−1	0	0	0

==== Goaltending ====
Player	MIN	GP	W	L	T	GA	GAA	SO
Ken Dryden	3580	62	42	10	8	121	2.03	8
Michel Larocque	1220	22	16	1	3	50	2.46	2
Team:	4800	80	58	11	11	171	2.14	10

=== Playoffs ===
==== Scoring ====
Player	Pos	GP	G	A	Pts	PIM	PPG	SHG	GWG
Guy Lafleur	RW	13	7	10	17	2	0	0	3
Steve Shutt	LW	13	7	8	15	2	3	0	0
Pete Mahovlich	C	13	4	8	12	24	2	0	1
Yvan Cournoyer	RW	13	3	6	9	4	2	0	1
Serge Savard	D	13	3	6	9	6	1	1	2
Guy Lapointe	D	13	3	3	6	12	1	0	1
Jacques Lemaire	C	13	3	3	6	2	1	1	1
Larry Robinson	D	13	3	3	6	10	0	0	1
Yvon Lambert	LW	12	2	3	5	18	0	0	1
Jim Roberts	D/RW	13	3	1	4	2	0	1	0
Bob Gainey	LW	13	1	3	4	20	0	0	0
Doug Jarvis	C	13	2	1	3	2	0	0	0
Bill Nyrop	D	13	0	3	3	12	0	0	0
Doug Risebrough	C	13	0	3	3	30	0	0	0
Pierre Bouchard	D	13	2	0	2	8	1	0	1
Murray Wilson	LW	12	1	1	2	6	0	0	0
Mario Tremblay	RW	10	0	1	1	27	0	0	0
Rick Chartraw	D/RW	2	0	0	0	0	0	0	0
Ken Dryden	G	13	0	0	0	0	0	0	0

==== Goaltending ====
Player	MIN	GP	W	L	GA	GAA	SO
Ken Dryden	780	13	12	1	25	1.92	1
Team:	780	13	12	1	25	1.92	1

Note:

Pos = Position;GP = Games played; G = Goals; A = Assists; Pts = Points; PIM = Penalty minutes; +/- = Plus/minus; PPG = Power-play goals; SHG = Short-handed goals; GWG = Game-winning goals
Pos = Position;GP = Games played; Min, TOI = Minutes played; W = Wins; L = Losses; T,T/OT = Ties; OTL = Overtime losses; GA = Goals-against; GAA = Goals-against average; SO = Shutouts; SA = Shots against; SV = Shots saved;SV% = Save percentage;

== Transactions ==
June 17, 1975	To Toronto Maple Leafs Wayne Thomas	To Montreal Canadiens Toronto's 1st round draft choice in the 1976 Amateur Draft (Peter Lee)

== Playoffs ==
=== Stanley Cup Finals ===
Guy Lafleur scored his first two career goals in the finals, both game-winners. Reggie Leach scored four time in the finals, and 19 for the play-offs to win the Conn Smythe Trophy despite the Flyers losing to the Canadiens.

==== Montreal Canadiens vs. Philadelphia Flyers ====
Date	Visitors	Score	Home	Score	Notes
May 9	Philadelphia	3	Montreal	4	
May 11	Philadelphia	1	Montreal	2	
May 13	Montreal	3	Philadelphia	2	
May 16	Montreal	5	Philadelphia	3	

Montreal wins the series 4–0. Reggie Leach won the Conn Smythe Trophy as playoff MVP.

== Awards and records ==
- Prince of Wales Trophy
- Ken Dryden, Vezina Trophy
- Guy Lafleur, Art Ross Trophy

== Draft picks ==
Round	#	Player	Nationality	College/junior/club team
1	9	Robin Sadler (D)	Canada	Edmonton Oil Kings (WCHL)
1	15	Pierre Mondou (F)	Canada	Montreal Bleu Blanc Rouge (QMJHL)
2	22	Brian Engblom (D)	Canada	University of Wisconsin (WCHA)
2	34	Kelly Greenbank (RW)	Canada	Winnipeg Clubs (WCHL)
3	51	Paul Woods (C)	Canada	Sault Ste. Marie Greyhounds (OMJHL)
3	52	Pat Hughes (RW)	Canada	University of Michigan (WCHA)
4	70	Dave Gorman (RW)	Canada	Phoenix Roadrunners (WHA)
5	88	Jim Turkiewicz (D)	Canada	Toronto Marlboros (WHA)
6	106	Michel Lachance (D)	Canada	Montreal Bleu Blanc Rouge (QMJHL)
7	124	Tim Burke (D)	United States	University of New Hampshire (ECAC)
8	142	Craig Norwich (D)	United States	University of Wisconsin (WCHA)
9	158	Paul Clarke (D)	Canada	University of Notre Dame (WCHA)
10	173	Bob Ferriter (C)	United States	Boston College (ECAC)
11	187	David Bell (C)	Canada	Harvard University (ECAC)
12	198	Carl Jackson (G)	Canada	University of Pennsylvania (ECAC)
13	204	Michel Brisebois (C)	Canada	Sherbrooke Castors (QMJHL)
14	208	Roger Bourque (D)	Canada	University of Notre Dame (WCHA)
15	211	Jim Lundquist (D)	United States	Brown University (ECAC)
16	214	Don Madson (C)	United States	Fargo Sugar Kings (MWJHL)
17	215	Bob Bain (D)	Canada	University of New Hampshire (ECAC)

== See also ==
- 1975–76 NHL season
