= 1975–76 Pittsburgh Penguins season =

NHL team season

1975–76 Pittsburgh Penguins
- Division: 3rd Norris
- Conference: 6th Wales
- 1975–76 record: 35–33–12
- Home record: 23–11–6
- Road record: 12–22–6
- Goals for: 339
- Goals against: 303

Team information
- General manager: Wren Blair
- Coach: Marc Boileau (Oct–Jan); Ken Schinkel (Jan–Apr)
- Captain: Ron Schock
- Alternate captains: None
- Arena: Pittsburgh Civic Arena

Team leaders
- Goals: Pierre Larouche (53)
- Assists: Syl Apps Jr. (67)
- Points: Pierre Larouche (111)
- Penalty minutes: Steve Durbano (161)
- Wins: Michel Plasse (24)
- Goals against average: Michel Plasse (3.45)

The 1975–76 Pittsburgh Penguins season was their ninth in the National Hockey League (NHL). They finished third in the Norris Division, as they had in 1974–75. Despite strong seasons by Pierre Larouche, who set new club records in goals scored in a season (53) and points in a season (111), Jean Pronovost and Syl Apps Jr. (who set a new club record for assists in a season with 67) the Penguins powerful offense scored a meagre three goals in three games against the Toronto Maple Leafs in the preliminary round of the Stanley Cup playoffs, ending their season.

== Regular season ==
=== Division standings ===
Norris Division
	GP	W	L	T	GF	GA	Pts
**Montreal Canadiens**	80	58	11	11	337	174	127
**Los Angeles Kings**	80	38	33	9	263	265	85
**Pittsburgh Penguins**	80	35	33	12	339	303	82
Detroit Red Wings	80	26	44	10	226	300	62
Washington Capitals	80	11	59	10	224	394	32

Note: GP = Games played, W = Wins, L = Losses, T = Ties, Pts = Points, GF = Goals for, GA = Goals against

Note: Teams that qualified for the playoffs are highlighted in bold.

=== Record vs. opponents ===
Norris Division record vs. opponents

**Vs. Wales Conference**

**Vs. Campbell Conference**

**Vs. Norris Division**

1975–76 NHL records
Team	**DET**	**LAK**	**MTL**	**PIT**	**WSH**	**Total**
Detroit	—	2–3–1	0–5–1	1–4–1	3–3	**6–15–3**
Los Angeles	3–2–1	—	2–3–1	1–5	4–1–1	**10–11–3**
Montreal	5–0–1	3–2–1	—	6–0	6–0	**20–2–2**
Pittsburgh	4–1–1	5–1	0–6	—	4–1–1	**13–9–2**
Washington	3–3	1–4–1	0–6	1–4–1	—	**5–17–2**

**Vs. Adams Division**

1975–76 NHL records
Team	**BOS**	**BUF**	**CAL**	**TOR**	**Total**
Detroit	0–3–2	1–4	1–3–1	1–2–2	**3–12–5**
Los Angeles	1–4	2–3	3–2	1–3–1	**7–12–1**
Montreal	3–0–2	3–2	5–0	3–1–1	**14–3–3**
Pittsburgh	0–3–2	1–4	2–2–1	4–1	**7–10–3**
Washington	0–4–1	0–4–1	1–3–1	0–4–1	**1–15–4**

**Vs. Patrick Division**

1975–76 NHL records
Team	**ATL**	**NYI**	**NYR**	**PHI**	**Total**
Detroit	3–1	1–3	1–3	2–2	**7–9**
Los Angeles	3–1	1–2–1	4–0	0–2–2	**8–5–3**
Montreal	4–0	2–1–1	3–0–1	1–2–1	**10–3–3**
Pittsburgh	2–1–1	1–2–1	3–1	0–3–1	**6–7–3**
Washington	0–4	0–4	2–2	0–3–1	**2–13–1**

**Vs. Smythe Division**

1975–76 NHL records
Team	**CHI**	**KCS**	**MIN**	**STL**	**VAN**	**Total**
Detroit	2–1–1	3–1	3–1	2–1–1	0–4	**10–8–2**
Los Angeles	2–2	4–0	2–1–1	2–1–1	3–1	**13–5–2**
Montreal	2–1–1	3–1	4–0	4–0	1–1–2	**14–3–3**
Pittsburgh	1–2–1	2–1–1	2–1–1	2–2	2–1–1	**9–7–4**
Washington	2–2	1–2–1	0–2–2	0–4	0–4	**3–14–3**

== Schedule and results ==
1975–76 regular season
October: 4–2–1 (home: 2–1–1; road: 2–1–0), 9 points

#	Date	Visitor	Score	Home	Location	Record	Points
1	Oct 7	Pittsburgh Penguins	4–2	Washington Capitals	Capital Centre	1–0–0	2
2	Oct 11	Washington Capitals	5–7	Pittsburgh Penguins	Civic Arena	2–0–0	4
3	Oct 15	Pittsburgh Penguins	8–4	Toronto Maple Leafs	Maple Leaf Gardens	3–0–0	6
4	Oct 18	Detroit Red Wings	1–6	Pittsburgh Penguins	Civic Arena	4–0–0	8
5	Oct 21	Montreal Canadiens	7–1	Pittsburgh Penguins	Civic Arena	4–1–0	8
6	Oct 25	Philadelphia Flyers	4–4	Pittsburgh Penguins	Civic Arena	4–1–1	9
7	Oct 30	Pittsburgh Penguins	0–4	Los Angeles Kings	The Forum	4–2–1	9

November: 6–8–1 (home: 4–4–0; road: 2–4–1), 13 points

#	Date	Visitor	Score	Home	Location	Record	Points
8	Nov 1	Pittsburgh Penguins	3–7	Minnesota North Stars	Met Center	4–3–1	9
9	Nov 2	Pittsburgh Penguins	2–7	Buffalo Sabres	Buffalo Memorial Auditorium	4–4–1	9
10	Nov 5	New York Islanders	6–7	Pittsburgh Penguins	Civic Arena	5–4–1	11
11	Nov 6	Pittsburgh Penguins	5–3	St. Louis Blues	St. Louis Arena	6–4–1	13
12	Nov 8	Chicago Black Hawks	7–5	Pittsburgh Penguins	Civic Arena	6–5–1	13
13	Nov 9	Pittsburgh Penguins	4–6	Philadelphia Flyers	The Spectrum	6–6–1	13
14	Nov 12	Pittsburgh Penguins	6–6	Washington Capitals	Capital Centre	6–6–2	14
15	Nov 13	Montreal Canadiens	5–4	Pittsburgh Penguins	Civic Arena	6–7–2	14
16	Nov 15	Buffalo Sabres	5–2	Pittsburgh Penguins	Civic Arena	6–8–2	14
17	Nov 18	California Golden Seals	5–3	Pittsburgh Penguins	Civic Arena	6–9–2	14
18	Nov 21	Pittsburgh Penguins	4–1	Atlanta Flames	Omni Coliseum	7–9–2	16
19	Nov 22	Los Angeles Kings	3–6	Pittsburgh Penguins	Civic Arena	8–9–2	18
20	Nov 26	Detroit Red Wings	2–5	Pittsburgh Penguins	Civic Arena	9–9–2	20
21	Nov 29	New York Rangers	3–8	Pittsburgh Penguins	Civic Arena	10–9–2	22
22	Nov 30	Pittsburgh Penguins	2–4	Boston Bruins	Boston Garden	10–10–2	22

December: 5–7–2 (home: 3–0–1; road: 2–7–1), 12 points

#	Date	Visitor	Score	Home	Location	Record	Points
23	Dec 3	Pittsburgh Penguins	3–3	Chicago Black Hawks	Chicago Stadium	10–10–3	23
24	Dec 4	Pittsburgh Penguins	1–6	New York Islanders	Nassau Veterans Memorial Coliseum	10–11–3	23
25	Dec 7	Toronto Maple Leafs	3–6	Pittsburgh Penguins	Civic Arena	11–11–3	25
26	Dec 9	Pittsburgh Penguins	2–3	Kansas City Scouts	Kemper Arena	11–12–3	25
27	Dec 10	Pittsburgh Penguins	2–3	Detroit Red Wings	Olympia Stadium	11–13–3	25
28	Dec 13	Boston Bruins	4–4	Pittsburgh Penguins	Civic Arena	11–13–4	26
29	Dec 14	Pittsburgh Penguins	4–7	Montreal Canadiens	Montreal Forum	11–14–4	26
30	Dec 17	Pittsburgh Penguins	9–2	California Golden Seals	Oakland Coliseum Arena	12–14–4	28
31	Dec 19	Pittsburgh Penguins	1–5	Vancouver Canucks	Pacific Coliseum	12–15–4	28
32	Dec 20	Pittsburgh Penguins	5–1	Los Angeles Kings	The Forum	13–15–4	30
33	Dec 23	Pittsburgh Penguins	3–4	New York Rangers	Madison Square Garden (IV)	13–16–4	30
34	Dec 26	Pittsburgh Penguins	3–4	Atlanta Flames	Omni Coliseum	13–17–4	30
35	Dec 27	Atlanta Flames	2–3	Pittsburgh Penguins	Civic Arena	14–17–4	32
36	Dec 31	Los Angeles Kings	1–5	Pittsburgh Penguins	Civic Arena	15–17–4	34

January: 4–7–3 (home: 4–2–2; road: 0–5–1), 11 points

#	Date	Visitor	Score	Home	Location	Record	Points
37	Jan 3	Philadelphia Flyers	8–4	Pittsburgh Penguins	Civic Arena	15–18–4	34
38	Jan 4	Pittsburgh Penguins	3–5	Chicago Black Hawks	Chicago Stadium	15–19–4	34
39	Jan 7	Pittsburgh Penguins	1–4	California Golden Seals	Oakland Coliseum Arena	15–20–4	34
40	Jan 10	Vancouver Canucks	3–3	Pittsburgh Penguins	Civic Arena	15–20–5	35
41	Jan 11	Pittsburgh Penguins	0–6	Buffalo Sabres	Buffalo Memorial Auditorium	15–21–5	35
42	Jan 13	Pittsburgh Penguins	2–6	Boston Bruins	Boston Garden	15–22–5	35
43	Jan 15	Pittsburgh Penguins	1–4	Philadelphia Flyers	The Spectrum	15–23–5	35
44	Jan 17	Buffalo Sabres	2–3	Pittsburgh Penguins	Civic Arena	16–23–5	37
45	Jan 18	New York Rangers	3–8	Pittsburgh Penguins	Civic Arena	17–23–5	39
46	Jan 22	Montreal Canadiens	4–3	Pittsburgh Penguins	Civic Arena	17–24–5	39
47	Jan 24	Washington Capitals	2–8	Pittsburgh Penguins	Civic Arena	18–24–5	41
48	Jan 25	Minnesota North Stars	1–1	Pittsburgh Penguins	Civic Arena	18–24–6	42
49	Jan 29	Kansas City Scouts	2–6	Pittsburgh Penguins	Civic Arena	19–24–6	44
50	Jan 31	Pittsburgh Penguins	4–4	Kansas City Scouts	Kemper Arena	19–24–7	45

February: 8–2–4 (home: 6–1–1; road: 2–1–3), 20 points

#	Date	Visitor	Score	Home	Location	Record	Points
51	Feb 1	Toronto Maple Leafs	1–7	Pittsburgh Penguins	Civic Arena	20–24–7	47
52	Feb 5	Pittsburgh Penguins	1–5	Boston Bruins	Boston Garden	20–25–7	47
53	Feb 7	Pittsburgh Penguins	7–3	Los Angeles Kings	The Forum	21–25–7	49
54	Feb 8	Pittsburgh Penguins	7–3	Vancouver Canucks	Pacific Coliseum	22–25–7	51
55	Feb 11	Pittsburgh Penguins	4–4	California Golden Seals	Oakland Coliseum Arena	22–25–8	52
56	Feb 14	Pittsburgh Penguins	4–4	New York Islanders	Nassau Veterans Memorial Coliseum	22–25–9	53
57	Feb 15	Los Angeles Kings	4–6	Pittsburgh Penguins	Civic Arena	23–25–9	55
58	Feb 17	Kansas City Scouts	1–6	Pittsburgh Penguins	Civic Arena	24–25–9	57
59	Feb 19	Toronto Maple Leafs	5–7	Pittsburgh Penguins	Civic Arena	25–25–9	59
60	Feb 21	Chicago Black Hawks	1–10	Pittsburgh Penguins	Civic Arena	26–25–9	61
61	Feb 22	Pittsburgh Penguins	2–2	Detroit Red Wings	Olympia Stadium	26–25–10	62
62	Feb 25	Atlanta Flames	3–3	Pittsburgh Penguins	Civic Arena	26–25–11	63
63	Feb 28	Vancouver Canucks	4–5	Pittsburgh Penguins	Civic Arena	27–25–11	65
64	Feb 29	St. Louis Blues	5–3	Pittsburgh Penguins	Civic Arena	27–26–11	65

March: 7–6–1 (home: 4–2–1; road: 3–4–0), 15 points

#	Date	Visitor	Score	Home	Location	Record	Points
65	Mar 2	Pittsburgh Penguins	6–2	Minnesota North Stars	Met Center	28–26–11	67
66	Mar 6	Minnesota North Stars	0–5	Pittsburgh Penguins	Civic Arena	29–26–11	69
67	Mar 7	New York Islanders	5–3	Pittsburgh Penguins	Civic Arena	29–27–11	69
68	Mar 10	Buffalo Sabres	7–6	Pittsburgh Penguins	Civic Arena	29–28–11	69
69	Mar 13	California Golden Seals	2–4	Pittsburgh Penguins	Civic Arena	30–28–11	71
70	Mar 14	St. Louis Blues	1–7	Pittsburgh Penguins	Civic Arena	31–28–11	73
71	Mar 16	Pittsburgh Penguins	4–5	Montreal Canadiens	Montreal Forum	31–29–11	73
72	Mar 19	Pittsburgh Penguins	7–3	Washington Capitals	Capital Centre	32–29–11	75
73	Mar 21	Pittsburgh Penguins	4–2	New York Rangers	Madison Square Garden (IV)	33–29–11	77
74	Mar 24	Boston Bruins	5–5	Pittsburgh Penguins	Civic Arena	33–29–12	78
75	Mar 25	Pittsburgh Penguins	2–5	St. Louis Blues	St. Louis Arena	33–30–12	78
76	Mar 28	Detroit Red Wings	0–3	Pittsburgh Penguins	Civic Arena	34–30–12	80
77	Mar 29	Pittsburgh Penguins	4–5	Toronto Maple Leafs	Maple Leaf Gardens	34–31–12	80
78	Mar 31	Pittsburgh Penguins	3–7	Montreal Canadiens	Montreal Forum	34–32–12	80

April: 1–1–0 (home: 0–1–0; road: 1–0–0), 2 points

#	Date	Visitor	Score	Home	Location	Record	Points
79	Apr 3	Washington Capitals	5–4	Pittsburgh Penguins	Civic Arena	34–33–12	80
80	Apr 4	Pittsburgh Penguins	6–5	Detroit Red Wings	Olympia Stadium	35–33–12	82

Legend: Win (2 points) Loss (0 points) Tie (1 point)

== Playoffs ==
The Penguins' made the playoffs for the fourth time in their history, losing in the preliminary round to Toronto.

April 6	Pittsburgh Penguins	1–4	Toronto Maple Leafs	Maple Leaf Gardens	Recap
No scoring		First period	13:01 – pp – Jim McKenny (1)
No scoring		Second period	04:44 – Lanny McDonald (1); 11:00 – Bob Neely (1)
Stan Gilbertson (1) – 04:17		Third period	15:02 – George Ferguson (1)
Michel Plasse 32 saves / 36 shots		Goalie stats	Wayne Thomas 35 saves / 36 shots

April 8	Toronto Maple Leafs	0–2	Pittsburgh Penguins	Civic Arena	Recap
No scoring		First period	No scoring
No scoring		Second period	11:25 – pp – Lowell MacDonald (1)
No scoring		Third period	19:21 – en – Vic Hadfield (1)
Wayne Thomas 47 saves / 48 shots		Goalie stats	Michel Plasse 21 saves / 21 shots

April 9	Pittsburgh Penguins	0–4	Toronto Maple Leafs	Maple Leaf Gardens	Recap
No scoring		First period	17:01 – Jim McKenny (2)
No scoring		Second period	02:03 – Pat Boutette (1); 09:14 – pp – Borje Salming (1)
No scoring		Third period	02:14 – Lanny McDonald (2)
Michel Plasse 32 saves / 36 shots		Goalie stats	Wayne Thomas 26 saves / 26 shots

Toronto won series 2–1

== Player statistics ==
Skaters

Regular season
Player	GP	G	A	Pts	+/−	PIM
Pierre Larouche	76	53	58	111	4	33
Jean Pronovost	80	52	52	104	16	24
Syl Apps Jr.	80	32	67	99	17	24
Rick Kehoe	71	29	47	76	9	6
Lowell MacDonald	69	30	43	73	14	12
Ron Stackhouse	80	11	60	71	19	76
Vic Hadfield	76	30	35	65	–3	46
Ron Schock	80	18	44	62	2	28
J. Bob Kelly	77	25	30	55	4	149
Dave Burrows	80	7	22	29	27	51
Barry Wilkins	75	0	27	27	–1	106
Stan Gilbertson^{†}	48	13	8	21	–3	6
Dennis Owchar	54	5	12	17	13	19
Colin Campbell	64	7	10	17	–4	105
Simon Nolet^{†}	39	9	8	17	7	2
Chuck Arnason^{‡}	30	7	3	10	–4	14
Lew Morrison	78	4	5	9	7	8
Mario Faubert	21	1	8	9	6	10
Steve Durbano^{‡}	32	0	8	8	9	161
Wayne Bianchin	14	1	5	6	–4	4
Harvey Bennett Jr.^{‡}	25	3	3	6	4	53
Ed Van Impe^{†}	12	0	5	5	4	16
Bob McManama	12	1	2	3	0	4
Jacques Cossette	7	0	2	2	–2	9
Ed Gilbert^{†}	38	1	1	2	–1	0
Bob Paradise^{‡}	9	0	0	0	–7	4
Total		339	565	904	—	970

Playoffs
Player	GP	G	A	Pts	+/−	PIM
Stan Gilbertson	3	1	1	2	0	2
Syl Apps Jr.	3	0	1	1	0	0
Ed Van Impe	3	0	1	1	0	2
Ron Schock	3	0	1	1	0	0
Lowell MacDonald	3	1	0	1	0	0
Barry Wilkins	3	0	1	1	0	4
Pierre Larouche	3	0	1	1	0	0
Vic Hadfield	3	1	0	1	0	11
Colin Campbell	3	0	0	0	0	0
Ron Stackhouse	3	0	0	0	0	0
Dennis Owchar	2	0	0	0	0	2
Jean Pronovost	3	0	0	0	0	2
J. Bob Kelly	3	0	0	0	0	2
Lew Morrison	3	0	0	0	0	0
Rick Kehoe	3	0	0	0	0	0
Simon Nolet	3	0	0	0	0	0
Dave Burrows	3	0	0	0	0	0
Total		3	6	9	—	25

Goaltenders

Regular Season
Player	GP	W	L	T	GA	SO
Michel Plasse	55	24	19	10	178	2
Gary Inness^{‡}	23	8	9	2	82	0
Gordon Laxton	8	3	4	0	31	0
Bobby Taylor^{†}	2	0	1	0	7	0
Total		35	33	12	298	2

Playoffs
Player	GP	W	L	T	GA	SO
Michel Plasse	3	1	2	0	8	1
Total		1	2	0	8	1

^{†}Denotes player spent time with another team before joining the Penguins. Stats reflect time with the Penguins only.
^{‡}Denotes player was traded mid-season. Stats reflect time with the Penguins only.

== Awards and records ==
- Jean Pronovost became the first player to score 200 goals for the Penguins. He did so in a 4–5 loss to Montreal on November 13.
- Jean Pronovost became the first player to score 400 points for the Penguins. He did so in a 5–2 win over Detroit on November 26.
- Jean Pronovost became the first person to score 50 goals in a season for the Penguins. He did so in a 5–5 tie with Boston on March 24.
- Pierre Larouche became the first person to score 100 points in a season for the Penguins. He did so in a 5–5 tie with Boston on March 24.
- Pierre Larouche established a new franchise record for goals in a season with 53, besting the previous high of 52 held by Jean Pronovost.
- Pierre Larouche established a new franchise record for points in a season with 111, besting the previous high of 86 held by Ron Schock.
- Syl Apps Jr. established a new franchise record for assists in a season with 67, besting the previous high of 63 held by Ron Schock.
- Ron Stackhouse established a new franchise record for assists (60) and points (71) by a defenseman in a season. He topped the previous highs of 45 assists 60 points both held by himself.
- Ron Stackhouse established a new franchise record for points by a defenseman with 150, besting the previous high of 104 held by Duane Rupp.

== Transactions ==
The Penguins were involved in the following transactions during the 1975–76 season:

=== Trades ===
November 26, 1975	To Washington Capitals Bob Paradise	To Pittsburgh Penguins 1976 2nd round pick (Greg Malone)
December 16, 1975	To Washington Capitals Harvey Bennett Jr.	To Pittsburgh Penguins Stan Gilbertson
January 9, 1976	To Kansas City Scouts Chuck Arnason; Steve Durbano; 1976 1st round pick (Paul Gardner)	To Pittsburgh Penguins Ed Gilbert; Simon Nolet; 1976 1st round pick (Blair Chapman)
March 8, 1976	To Philadelphia Flyers Gary Inness; 1977 9th round pick (Tom Bauer); 1977 eleventh round pick (Jim Trainor); 1977 tenth round pick (Rob Nicholson); 1977 twelfth round pick (Mike Laycock) future considerations (1977 8th round pick--Pete Peeters)	To Pittsburgh Penguins Bobby Taylor; Ed Van Impe

=== Additions and subtractions ===
Additions
Player	Former team	Via
—	—	—

Subtractions
Player	New team	Via
Larry Bignell	Denver Spurs (WHA)	free agency
Bob Johnson	Denver Spurs (WHA)	free agency (1975-09)
Bob McManama	New England Whalers (WHA)	free agency

== Draft picks ==
The 1975 NHL amateur draft was held in Montreal.

Round	#	Player	Pos	Nationality	College/Junior/Club team (League)
1	13	Gordon Laxton	Goaltender	Canada	New Westminster Bruins (WCHL)
2	31	Russell Anderson	Defense	United States	U. of Minnesota (NCAA)
3	49	Paul Baxter	Defense	Canada	Cleveland Crusaders (WHA)
4	67	Stu Younger	Left wing	Canada	Michigan Tech (NCAA)
5	85	Kimbel Clackson	Defense	Canada	Victoria Cougars (WCHL)
6	103	Peter Morris	Forward	Canada	Victoria Cougars (WCHL)
7	121	Mike Will	Forward	Canada	Edmonton Oil Kings (WCHL)
8	139	Tapio Levo	Defense	Finland	(Finland Jr. Nationals)
9	155	Byron Shutt	Left wing	Canada	Bowling Green State University (NCAA)
10	170	Frank Salive	Goaltender	Canada	Peterborough Petes (OHA)
11	185	John Glynne	Defense	United States	U. of Vermont (NCAA)
12	196	Alexander Hudson	Defense	Canada	U. of Denver (NCAA)
13	202	Dan Tsubouchi	Right wing	Canada	St. Louis University (NCAA)
14	206	Bronisla Stankovsky	Forward	United States	Fargo-Moorhead Sugar Kings (MJHL)
16	217	Kelly Secord	Forward	Canada	New Westminster Bruins (WCHL)
