= 1975–76 Washington Capitals season =

NHL hockey team season

1975–76 Washington Capitals
- Division: 5th Norris
- Conference: 9th Campbell
- 1975–76 record: 11–59–10
- Home record: 6–26–8
- Road record: 5–33–2
- Goals for: 224
- Goals against: 394

Team information
- General manager: Milt Schmidt
- Coach: Milt Schmidt; Tom McVie
- Captain: Bill Clement; Yvon Labre
- Alternate captains: None
- Arena: Capital Centre

Team leaders
- Goals: Nelson Pyatt (26)
- Assists: Hartland Monahan (29)
- Points: Nelson Pyatt (49)
- Penalty minutes: Yvon Labre (146)
- Wins: Ron Low (6)
- Goals against average: Bernie Wolfe (4.16)

The 1975–76 Washington Capitals season was the Washington Capitals second season in the National Hockey League (NHL). They improved by three games over their dreadful previous season, faring worse than the Kansas City Scouts, who went 12–56–12 (while going 1–2–1 against them), although the latter would move to Colorado after the season while the Capitals remained in their location. Despite a slightly improved record from the previous season, the Capitals failed to qualify for the playoffs for the second year in a row for the first time in franchise history.

== Regular season ==
=== Final standings ===
Norris Division
	GP	W	L	T	GF	GA	Pts
**Montreal Canadiens**	80	58	11	11	337	174	127
**Los Angeles Kings**	80	38	33	9	263	265	85
**Pittsburgh Penguins**	80	35	33	12	339	303	82
Detroit Red Wings	80	26	44	10	226	300	62
Washington Capitals	80	11	59	10	224	394	32

Note: GP = Games played, W = Wins, L = Losses, T = Ties, Pts = Points, GF = Goals for, GA = Goals against

Note: Teams that qualified for the playoffs are highlighted in bold.

=== Record vs. opponents ===
Norris Division record vs. opponents

**Vs. Wales Conference**

**Vs. Campbell Conference**

**Vs. Norris Division**

1975–76 NHL records
Team	**DET**	**LAK**	**MTL**	**PIT**	**WSH**	**Total**
Detroit	—	2–3–1	0–5–1	1–4–1	3–3	**6–15–3**
Los Angeles	3–2–1	—	2–3–1	1–5	4–1–1	**10–11–3**
Montreal	5–0–1	3–2–1	—	6–0	6–0	**20–2–2**
Pittsburgh	4–1–1	5–1	0–6	—	4–1–1	**13–9–2**
Washington	3–3	1–4–1	0–6	1–4–1	—	**5–17–2**

**Vs. Adams Division**

1975–76 NHL records
Team	**BOS**	**BUF**	**CAL**	**TOR**	**Total**
Detroit	0–3–2	1–4	1–3–1	1–2–2	**3–12–5**
Los Angeles	1–4	2–3	3–2	1–3–1	**7–12–1**
Montreal	3–0–2	3–2	5–0	3–1–1	**14–3–3**
Pittsburgh	0–3–2	1–4	2–2–1	4–1	**7–10–3**
Washington	0–4–1	0–4–1	1–3–1	0–4–1	**1–15–4**

**Vs. Patrick Division**

1975–76 NHL records
Team	**ATL**	**NYI**	**NYR**	**PHI**	**Total**
Detroit	3–1	1–3	1–3	2–2	**7–9**
Los Angeles	3–1	1–2–1	4–0	0–2–2	**8–5–3**
Montreal	4–0	2–1–1	3–0–1	1–2–1	**10–3–3**
Pittsburgh	2–1–1	1–2–1	3–1	0–3–1	**6–7–3**
Washington	0–4	0–4	2–2	0–3–1	**2–13–1**

**Vs. Smythe Division**

1975–76 NHL records
Team	**CHI**	**KCS**	**MIN**	**STL**	**VAN**	**Total**
Detroit	2–1–1	3–1	3–1	2–1–1	0–4	**10–8–2**
Los Angeles	2–2	4–0	2–1–1	2–1–1	3–1	**13–5–2**
Montreal	2–1–1	3–1	4–0	4–0	1–1–2	**14–3–3**
Pittsburgh	1–2–1	2–1–1	2–1–1	2–2	2–1–1	**9–7–4**
Washington	2–2	1–2–1	0–2–2	0–4	0–4	**3–14–3**

== Schedule and results ==
1975–76 regular season
October

Game	Result	Date	Score	Opponent	Record
1	L	October 7, 1975	2–4	Pittsburgh Penguins (1975–76)	0–1–0
2	L	October 9, 1975	4–5	@ Philadelphia Flyers (1975–76)	0–2–0
3	L	October 11, 1975	5–7	@ Pittsburgh Penguins (1975–76)	0–3–0
4	L	October 14, 1975	2–7	@ Vancouver Canucks (1975–76)	0–4–0
5	L	October 15, 1975	3–4	@ Los Angeles Kings (1975–76)	0–5–0
6	T	October 17, 1975	3–3	@ California Golden Seals (1975–76)	0–5–1
7	L	October 19, 1975	4–5	@ Buffalo Sabres (1975–76)	0–6–1
8	L	October 22, 1975	2–4	Kansas City Scouts (1975–76)	0–7–1
9	L	October 24, 1975	3–6	Toronto Maple Leafs (1975–76)	0–8–1
10	W	October 26, 1975	7–5	@ Chicago Black Hawks (1975–76)	1–8–1
11	L	October 28, 1975	0–6	@ Los Angeles Kings (1975–76)	1–9–1
12	W	October 30, 1975	6–2	@ Kansas City Scouts (1975–76)	2–9–1

November

Game	Result	Date	Score	Opponent	Record
13	L	November 1, 1975	3–7	@ New York Islanders (1975–76)	2–10–1
14	L	November 5, 1975	1–3	Los Angeles Kings (1975–76)	2–11–1
15	L	November 9, 1975	3–5	St. Louis Blues (1975–76)	2–12–1
16	T	November 12, 1975	6–6	Pittsburgh Penguins (1975–76)	2–12–2
17	L	November 14, 1975	1–4	Atlanta Flames (1975–76)	2–13–2
18	L	November 15, 1975	2–9	@ St. Louis Blues (1975–76)	2–14–2
19	L	November 18, 1975	2–4	@ Toronto Maple Leafs (1975–76)	2–15–2
20	L	November 19, 1975	2–5	Vancouver Canucks (1975–76)	2–16–2
21	L	November 21, 1975	0–2	California Golden Seals (1975–76)	2–17–2
22	W	November 26, 1975	7–2	Los Angeles Kings (1975–76)	3–17–2
23	L	November 29, 1975	3–5	@ Minnesota North Stars (1975–76)	3–18–2

December

Game	Result	Date	Score	Opponent	Record
24	T	December 3, 1975	4–4	Buffalo Sabres (1975–76)	3–18–3
25	L	December 4, 1975	2–3	@ Boston Bruins (1975–76)	3–19–3
26	L	December 6, 1975	3–9	@ Montreal Canadiens (1975–76)	3–20–3
27	L	December 7, 1975	2–5	@ New York Rangers (1975–76)	3–21–3
28	L	December 9, 1975	1–7	@ Atlanta Flames (1975–76)	3–22–3
29	L	December 10, 1975	2–7	Chicago Black Hawks (1975–76)	3–23–3
30	L	December 12, 1975	3–5	Detroit Red Wings (1975–76)	3–24–3
31	T	December 14, 1975	4–4	Minnesota North Stars (1975–76)	3–24–4
32	L	December 17, 1975	2–3	Boston Bruins (1975–76)	3–25–4
33	L	December 19, 1975	5–7	Philadelphia Flyers (1975–76)	3–26–4
34	L	December 21, 1975	2–14	@ Buffalo Sabres (1975–76)	3–27–4
35	T	December 26, 1975	1–1	Minnesota North Stars (1975–76)	3–27–5
36	L	December 29, 1975	0–6	Montreal Canadiens (1975–76)	3–28–5
37	L	December 31, 1975	0–4	@ Detroit Red Wings (1975–76)	3–29–5

January

Game	Result	Date	Score	Opponent	Record
38	L	January 2, 1976	5–8	California Golden Seals (1975–76)	3–30–5
39	L	January 3, 1976	0–7	@ Montreal Canadiens (1975–76)	3–31–5
40	L	January 6, 1976	3–5	Vancouver Canucks (1975–76)	3–32–5
41	L	January 8, 1976	2–4	@ St. Louis Blues (1975–76)	3–33–5
42	L	January 9, 1976	0–5	California Golden Seals (1975–76)	3–34–5
43	L	January 11, 1976	4–7	Boston Bruins (1975–76)	3–35–5
44	L	January 13, 1976	2–3	Montreal Canadiens (1975–76)	3–36–5
45	L	January 15, 1976	3–5	@ Buffalo Sabres (1975–76)	3–37–5
46	L	January 17, 1976	3–7	@ Minnesota North Stars (1975–76)	3–38–5
47	L	January 21, 1976	2–5	New York Islanders (1975–76)	3–39–5
48	W	January 23, 1976	7–5	New York Rangers (1975–76)	4–39–5
49	L	January 24, 1976	2–8	@ Pittsburgh Penguins (1975–76)	4–40–5
50	L	January 27, 1976	0–2	@ Los Angeles Kings (1975–76)	4–41–5
51	W	January 28, 1976	4–2	@ California Golden Seals (1975–76)	5–41–5
52	L	January 30, 1976	2–4	@ Vancouver Canucks (1975–76)	5–42–5

February

Game	Result	Date	Score	Opponent	Record
53	T	February 4, 1976	4–4	@ Toronto Maple Leafs (1975–76)	5–42–6
54	L	February 7, 1976	1–5	@ Kansas City Scouts (1975–76)	5–43–6
55	L	February 8, 1976	2–4	@ Chicago Black Hawks (1975–76)	5–44–6
56	T	February 10, 1976	2–2	Los Angeles Kings (1975–76)	5–44–7
57	L	February 13, 1976	0–2	St. Louis Blues (1975–76)	5–45–7
58	W	February 15, 1976	8–5	Detroit Red Wings (1975–76)	6–45–7
59	L	February 16, 1976	1–5	Toronto Maple Leafs (1975–76)	6–46–7
60	L	February 18, 1976	4–11	@ New York Rangers (1975–76)	6–47–7
61	W	February 21, 1976	5–1	@ Detroit Red Wings (1975–76)	7–47–7
62	L	February 22, 1976	0–4	New York Islanders (1975–76)	7–48–7
63	T	February 24, 1976	5–5	Philadelphia Flyers (1975–76)	7–48–8
64	T	February 27, 1976	3–3	Boston Bruins (1975–76)	7–48–9
65	W	February 29, 1976	4–1	Chicago Black Hawks (1975–76)	8–48–9

March

Game	Result	Date	Score	Opponent	Record
66	L	March 6, 1976	3–6	@ New York Islanders (1975–76)	8–49–9
67	L	March 7, 1976	3–4	@ Boston Bruins (1975–76)	8–50–9
68	L	March 12, 1976	1–4	@ Atlanta Flames (1975–76)	8–51–9
69	L	March 14, 1976	1–5	@ Montreal Canadiens (1975–76)	8–52–9
70	W	March 16, 1976	5–2	New York Rangers (1975–76)	9–52–9
71	L	March 19, 1976	3–7	Pittsburgh Penguins (1975–76)	9–53–9
72	L	March 20, 1976	3–7	@ Toronto Maple Leafs (1975–76)	9–54–9
73	T	March 23, 1976	5–5	Kansas City Scouts (1975–76)	9–54–10
74	L	March 24, 1976	3–7	@ Detroit Red Wings (1975–76)	9–55–10
75	L	March 26, 1976	1–4	Buffalo Sabres (1975–76)	9–56–10
76	L	March 28, 1976	1–3	Atlanta Flames (1975–76)	9–57–10
77	W	March 30, 1976	5–3	Detroit Red Wings (1975–76)	10–57–10

April

Game	Result	Date	Score	Opponent	Record
78	L	April 1, 1976	2–11	@ Philadelphia Flyers (1975–76)	10–58–10
79	W	April 3, 1976	5–4	@ Pittsburgh Penguins (1975–76)	11–58–10
80	L	April 4, 1976	3–4	Montreal Canadiens (1975–76)	11–59–10

Legend: Win (2 points) Loss (0 points) Tie (1 point)

== Player statistics ==
=== Regular season ===
Scoring

Player	Pos	GP	G	A	Pts	PIM	+/-	PPG	SHG	GWG
Nelson Pyatt	C	77	26	23	49	14	-56	5	0	0
Hartland Monahan	RW	80	17	29	46	35	-49	2	0	2
Tony White	LW	80	25	17	42	56	-43	7	0	2
Garnet Bailey	LW	67	13	19	32	75	-42	2	0	2
Gerry Meehan	C	32	16	15	31	10	-7	3	0	0
Bob Sirois	RW	43	10	19	29	6	-33	4	0	0
Ron Lalonde	C	80	9	19	28	19	-26	2	1	0
Stan Gilbertson	LW	31	13	14	27	6	-25	5	0	0
Blair Stewart	C	74	13	14	27	113	-53	0	0	0
Bill Clement	C	46	10	17	27	20	-30	2	0	0
Greg Joly	D	54	8	17	25	28	-46	3	1	1
Harvey Bennett	C	49	12	10	22	39	-27	1	0	1
Jack Lynch	D	79	9	13	22	78	-52	5	0	1
Yvon Labre	D	80	2	20	22	146	-38	0	0	0
Tommy Williams	RW	34	8	13	21	6	-33	2	0	0
Jean Lemieux	D	33	6	14	20	2	-21	5	0	1
Mike Lampman	LW	27	7	12	19	28	-6	0	0	1
Peter Scamurra	D	58	2	13	15	33	-38	1	0	0
Rick Bragnalo	C	19	2	10	12	8	-4	0	0	0
Bob Gryp	LW	46	6	5	11	12	-18	0	0	0
Mike Marson	LW	57	4	7	11	50	-19	0	0	0
Willie Brossart	D	49	0	8	8	40	-49	0	0	0
Bob Paradise	D	48	0	8	8	42	-41	0	0	0
Jack Egers	RW	12	3	3	6	8	-2	2	0	0
Gord Smith	D	25	1	2	3	28	-22	1	0	0
John Paddock	RW	8	1	1	2	12	-5	0	0	0
Paul Nicholson	LW	14	0	2	2	9	-4	0	0	0
Gord Lane	D	3	1	0	1	12	-5	1	0	0
Michel Belhumeur	G	7	0	1	1	0	0	0	0	0
Larry Bolonchuk	D	1	0	1	1	0	-1	0	0	0
Brian Kinsella	C	4	0	1	1	0	-2	0	0	0
Ron Jones	D	2	0	0	0	0	-1	0	0	0
Ron Low	G	43	0	0	0	2	0	0	0	0
Don McLean	D	9	0	0	0	6	-3	0	0	0
Brian Stapleton	RW	1	0	0	0	0	-2	0	0	0
Bernie Wolfe	G	40	0	0	0	0	0	0	0	0

Goaltending

Player	MIN	GP	W	L	T	GA	GAA	SO
Ron Low	2289	43	6	31	2	208	5.45	0
Bernie Wolfe	2134	40	5	23	7	148	4.16	0
Michel Belhumeur	377	7	0	5	1	32	5.09	0
Team:	4800	80	11	59	10	388	4.85	0

Note: GP = Games played; G = Goals; A = Assists; Pts = Points; +/- = Plus/minus; PIM = Penalty minutes; PPG=Power-play goals; SHG=Short-handed goals; GWG=Game-winning goals
MIN=Minutes played; W = Wins; L = Losses; T = Ties; GA = Goals against; GAA = Goals against average; SO = Shutouts;

== Draft picks ==
Washington's draft picks at the 1975 NHL amateur draft held in Montreal.

Round	#	Player	Nationality	College/Junior/Club team (League)
1	18	Alex Forsyth	Canada	Kingston Canadians (OMJHL)
2	19	Peter Scamurra	United States	Peterborough Petes (OMJHL)
4	55	Blair MacKasey	Canada	Montreal Bleu Blanc Rouge (QMJHL)
5	73	Craig Crawford	Canada	Toronto Marlboros (OMJHL)
6	91	Roger Swanson	Canada	Flin Flon Bombers (WCHL)
7	109	Clark Jantzie	Canada	University of Alberta (CIAU)
8	127	Mike Fryia	Canada	Peterborough Petes (OMJHL)
9	144	Jim Ofrim	Canada	University of Alberta (CIAU)
10	161	Mal Zinger	Canada	Kamloops Chiefs (WCHL)

== See also ==
- 1975–76 NHL season
