= 1975–76 Toronto Maple Leafs season =

NHL hockey team season

1975–76 Toronto Maple Leafs
- Division: 3rd Adams
- Conference: 5th Wales
- 1975–76 record: 34–31–5
- Home record: 23–12–5
- Road record: 11–19–10
- Goals for: 294
- Goals against: 276

Team information
- General manager: Jim Gregory
- Coach: Red Kelly
- Captain: Darryl Sittler
- Alternate captains: None
- Arena: Maple Leaf Gardens

Team leaders
- Goals: Errol Thompson (43)
- Assists: Darryl Sittler (59)
- Points: Darryl Sittler (100)
- Penalty minutes: Tiger Williams (299)
- Wins: Wayne Thomas (28)
- Goals against average: Wayne Thomas (3.19)

The 1975–76 Toronto Maple Leafs season saw the Maple Leafs finish in third place in the Adams Division with a record of 34 wins, 31 losses, and 15 ties for 83 points, qualifying for the playoffs for the third consecutive year. They defeated the Pittsburgh Penguins two games to one in the preliminary round before losing the Quarter-Finals in seven games to the Philadelphia Flyers.

== Offseason ==
=== NHL draft ===
Round	#	Player	Nationality	College/junior/club team
1	6	Don Ashby (C)	Canada	Calgary Centennials (WCHL)
2	24	Doug Jarvis (C)	Canada	Peterborough Petes (OMJHL)
3	42	Bruce Boudreau (C)	Canada	Toronto Marlboros (OMJHL)
5	78	Ted Long (D)	Canada	Hamilton Fincups (OMJHL)
6	96	Kevin Campbell (D)	Canada	St. Lawrence University (ECAC)
7	114	Mario Rouillard (RW)	Canada	Trois-Rivières Draveurs (QMJHL)
8	132	Ron Wilson (D)	United States	Providence College (ECAC)
9	149	Paul Evans (LW)	Canada	Peterborough Petes (OMJHL)
10	165	Jean Latendresse (D)	Canada	Shawinigan Dynamos (QMJHL)
10	166	Paul Crowley (RW)	Canada	Sudbury Wolves (OMJHL)
11	179	Dan D'Alvise (C)	Canada	Royal York Rangers (OPJHL)
11	180	Jack Laine (RW)	Canada	Bowling Green University (CCHA)
12	188	Ken Holland (G)	Canada	Medicine Hat Tigers (WCHL)
12	189	Bob Barnes (D)	Canada	Hamilton Fincups (OMJHL)
12	191	Gary Burns (LW)	United States	University of New Hampshire (ECAC)
12	193	Jim Montgomery (C)	Canada	Hull Festivals (QMJHL)
13	199	Rick Martin (RW)	Canada	London Knights (OMJHL)

== Regular season ==
=== Sittler's Ten Point Night ===
- February 7, 1976 – In his first season as captain Darryl Sittler set the NHL record for most points scored in one game when he recorded ten points (six goals, four assists) against the Boston Bruins. At the 9:27 mark of the third period, he scored a goal and earned the ninth point of the game, breaking the NHL record for most points in a game. He would go on to earn another point to set a new record with 10 points in a game. To this day, this record still stands. In addiction, Sittler finished the season with 41 goals and 59 assists, being the first Leaf ever to reach the 100-point mark.

=== Season standings ===
Adams Division
	GP	W	L	T	GF	GA	Pts
**Boston Bruins**	80	48	15	17	313	237	113
**Buffalo Sabres**	80	46	21	13	339	240	105
**Toronto Maple Leafs**	80	34	31	15	294	276	83
California Golden Seals	80	27	42	11	250	278	65

Note: GP = Games played, W = Wins, L = Losses, T = Ties, Pts = Points, GF = Goals for, GA = Goals against
Note: Teams that qualified for the playoffs are highlighted in bold.

=== Record vs. opponents ===
Adams Division record vs. opponents

**Vs. Wales Conference**

**Vs. Campbell Conference**

**Vs. Adams Division**

1975–76 NHL records
Team	**BOS**	**BUF**	**CAL**	**TOR**	**Total**
Boston	—	3–2–1	5–1	4–1–1	**12–4–2**
Buffalo	2–3–1	—	5–0–1	4–2	**11–5–2**
California	1–5	0–5–1	—	1–3–2	**2–13–3**
Toronto	1–4–1	2–4	3–1–2	—	**6–9–3**

**Vs. Norris Division**

1975–76 NHL records
Team	**DET**	**LAK**	**MTL**	**PIT**	**WSH**	**Total**
Boston	3–0–2	4–1	0–3–2	3–0–2	4–0–1	**14–4–7**
Buffalo	4–1	3–2	2–3	4–1	4–0–1	**17–7–1**
California	3–1–1	2–3	0–5	2–2–1	3–1–1	**10–12–3**
Toronto	2–1–2	3–1–1	1–3–1	1–4	4–0–1	**11–9–5**

**Vs. Patrick Division**

1975–76 NHL records
Team	**ATL**	**NYI**	**NYR**	**PHI**	**Total**
Boston	3–2	2–0–2	3–1	2–1–1	**10–4–3**
Buffalo	2–1–1	2–2	2–0–3	0–3–1	**6–6–5**
California	1–3	1–3	3–1	0–4–1	**5–11–1**
Toronto	2–2	1–3–1	4–0	0–3–1	**7–8–2**

**Vs. Smythe Division**

1975–76 NHL records
Team	**CHI**	**KCS**	**MIN**	**STL**	**VAN**	**Total**
Boston	3–0–1	2–1–1	3–0–1	2–1–1	2–1–1	**12–3–5**
Buffalo	2–0–2	3–0–1	4–0	2–1–1	1–2–1	**12–3–5**
California	2–1–1	1–2–1	3–1	2–1–1	2–1–1	**10–6–4**
Toronto	1–2–1	3–0–1	3–1	2–0–2	1–2–1	**10–5–5**

== Schedule and results ==
1975–76 regular season
October

Game	Result	Date	Score	Opponent	Record
1	W	October 11, 1975	2–1	Chicago Black Hawks (1975–76)	1–0–0
2	L	October 12, 1975	3–8	@ Buffalo Sabres (1975–76)	1–1–0
3	L	October 15, 1975	4–8	Pittsburgh Penguins (1975–76)	1–2–0
4	W	October 18, 1975	4–1	New York Rangers (1975–76)	2–2–0
5	L	October 19, 1975	0–3	@ Boston Bruins (1975–76)	2–3–0
6	W	October 22, 1975	3–2	Vancouver Canucks (1975–76)	3–3–0
7	W	October 24, 1975	6–3	@ Washington Capitals (1975–76)	4–3–0
8	T	October 25, 1975	2–2	California Golden Seals (1975–76)	4–3–1
9	W	October 29, 1975	3–2	Buffalo Sabres (1975–76)	5–3–1
10	L	October 30, 1975	2–6	@ Philadelphia Flyers (1975–76)	5–4–1

November

Game	Result	Date	Score	Opponent	Record
11	W	November 1, 1975	3–0	Kansas City Scouts (1975–76)	6–4–1
12	W	November 5, 1975	7–3	Detroit Red Wings (1975–76)	7–4–1
13	T	November 7, 1975	3–3	@ Kansas City Scouts (1975–76)	7–4–2
14	T	November 8, 1975	3–3	@ St. Louis Blues (1975–76)	7–4–3
15	L	November 11, 1975	2–3	@ Vancouver Canucks (1975–76)	7–5–3
16	W	November 14, 1975	4–2	@ California Golden Seals (1975–76)	8–5–3
17	T	November 15, 1975	1–1	@ Los Angeles Kings (1975–76)	8–5–4
18	W	November 18, 1975	4–2	Washington Capitals (1975–76)	9–5–4
19	L	November 22, 1975	2–4	Montreal Canadiens (1975–76)	9–6–4
20	T	November 23, 1975	3–3	@ Boston Bruins (1975–76)	9–6–5
21	T	November 26, 1975	4–4	@ Chicago Black Hawks (1975–76)	9–6–6
22	L	November 28, 1975	3–6	@ Atlanta Flames (1975–76)	9–7–6
23	T	November 29, 1975	1–1	Philadelphia Flyers (1975–76)	9–7–7

December

Game	Result	Date	Score	Opponent	Record
24	L	December 3, 1975	1–3	@ Minnesota North Stars (1975–76)	9–8–7
25	L	December 6, 1975	2–4	Boston Bruins (1975–76)	9–9–7
26	L	December 7, 1975	3–6	@ Pittsburgh Penguins (1975–76)	9–10–7
27	T	December 10, 1975	3–3	@ Montreal Canadiens (1975–76)	9–10–8
28	L	December 13, 1975	3–5	New York Islanders (1975–76)	9–11–8
29	W	December 14, 1975	6–1	@ New York Rangers (1975–76)	10–11–8
30	W	December 17, 1975	6–2	St. Louis Blues (1975–76)	11–11–8
31	L	December 18, 1975	2–4	@ New York Islanders (1975–76)	11–12–8
32	W	December 20, 1975	5–1	Kansas City Scouts (1975–76)	12–12–8
33	W	December 22, 1975	4–3	Los Angeles Kings (1975–76)	13–12–8
34	L	December 27, 1975	1–4	Chicago Black Hawks (1975–76)	13–13–8
35	W	December 29, 1975	6–2	Atlanta Flames (1975–76)	14–13–8

January

Game	Result	Date	Score	Opponent	Record
36	W	January 1, 1976	5–1	California Golden Seals (1975–76)	15–13–8
37	L	January 3, 1976	0–1	Detroit Red Wings (1975–76)	15–14–8
38	W	January 4, 1976	8–6	@ New York Rangers (1975–76)	16–14–8
39	L	January 7, 1976	3–7	Philadelphia Flyers (1975–76)	16–15–8
40	W	January 8, 1976	5–3	@ New York Islanders (1975–76)	17–15–8
41	W	January 10, 1976	4–3	Los Angeles Kings (1975–76)	18–15–8
42	L	January 11, 1976	0–2	@ Montreal Canadiens (1975–76)	18–16–8
43	W	January 14, 1976	6–5	@ Minnesota North Stars (1975–76)	19–16–8
44	W	January 15, 1976	6–4	@ Kansas City Scouts (1975–76)	20–16–8
45	T	January 17, 1976	4–4	@ Detroit Red Wings (1975–76)	20–16–9
46	L	January 22, 1976	3–6	@ Los Angeles Kings (1975–76)	20–17–9
47	T	January 24, 1976	5–5	@ Vancouver Canucks (1975–76)	20–17–10
48	L	January 25, 1976	3–5	@ California Golden Seals (1975–76)	20–18–10
49	L	January 28, 1976	2–3	New York Islanders (1975–76)	20–19–10
50	W	January 31, 1976	6–4	New York Rangers (1975–76)	21–19–10

February

Game	Result	Date	Score	Opponent	Record
51	L	February 1, 1976	1–7	@ Pittsburgh Penguins (1975–76)	21–20–10
52	T	February 4, 1976	4–4	Washington Capitals (1975–76)	21–20–11
53	W	February 7, 1976	11–4	Boston Bruins (1975–76)	22–20–11
54	W	February 8, 1976	4–1	Minnesota North Stars (1975–76)	23–20–11
55	L	February 11, 1976	2–5	@ Atlanta Flames (1975–76)	23–21–11
56	L	February 14, 1976	3–4	Vancouver Canucks (1975–76)	23–22–11
57	W	February 16, 1976	5–1	@ Washington Capitals (1975–76)	24–22–11
58	L	February 18, 1976	5–7	Montreal Canadiens (1975–76)	24–23–11
59	L	February 19, 1976	5–7	@ Pittsburgh Penguins (1975–76)	24–24–11
60	W	February 21, 1976	6–4	Buffalo Sabres (1975–76)	25–24–11
61	W	February 23, 1976	7–1	Atlanta Flames (1975–76)	26–24–11
62	W	February 25, 1976	8–0	Detroit Red Wings (1975–76)	27–24–11
63	L	February 26, 1976	2–5	@ Buffalo Sabres (1975–76)	27–25–11
64	W	February 28, 1976	4–2	California Golden Seals (1975–76)	28–25–11

March

Game	Result	Date	Score	Opponent	Record
65	W	March 1, 1976	4–2	Minnesota North Stars (1975–76)	29–25–11
66	W	March 3, 1976	4–1	@ St. Louis Blues (1975–76)	30–25–11
67	W	March 6, 1976	4–1	@ Los Angeles Kings (1975–76)	31–25–11
68	T	March 7, 1976	7–7	@ California Golden Seals (1975–76)	31–25–12
69	T	March 10, 1976	2–2	St. Louis Blues (1975–76)	31–25–13
70	L	March 11, 1976	2–6	@ Boston Bruins (1975–76)	31–26–13
71	T	March 13, 1976	2–2	New York Islanders (1975–76)	31–26–14
72	L	March 17, 1976	5–6	@ Chicago Black Hawks (1975–76)	31–27–14
73	W	March 20, 1976	7–3	Washington Capitals (1975–76)	32–27–14
74	L	March 21, 1976	2–4	@ Philadelphia Flyers (1975–76)	32–28–14
75	W	March 24, 1976	2–1	@ Montreal Canadiens (1975–76)	33–28–14
76	L	March 27, 1976	2–4	Buffalo Sabres (1975–76)	33–29–14
77	W	March 29, 1976	5–4	Pittsburgh Penguins (1975–76)	34–29–14
78	T	March 31, 1976	4–4	@ Detroit Red Wings (1975–76)	34–29–15

April

Game	Result	Date	Score	Opponent	Record
79	L	April 3, 1976	2–4	Boston Bruins (1975–76)	34–30–15
80	L	April 4, 1976	2–5	@ Buffalo Sabres (1975–76)	34–31–15

Legend: Win (2 points) Loss (0 points) Tie (1 point)

== Player statistics ==
=== Regular season ===
Scoring

Player	Pos	GP	G	A	Pts	PIM	+/-	PPG	SHG	GWG
Darryl Sittler	C	79	41	59	100	90	12	11	1	2
Lanny McDonald	RW	75	37	56	93	70	24	6	5	4
Errol Thompson	LW	75	43	37	80	26	28	13	1	7
Borje Salming	D	78	16	41	57	70	33	8	0	1
Ian Turnbull	D	76	20	36	56	90	24	7	1	3
Stan Weir	C	64	19	32	51	22	10	5	0	3
George Ferguson	C	79	12	32	44	76	11	3	2	2
Tiger Williams	LW	78	21	19	40	299	-1	3	0	3
Inge Hammarstrom	LW	76	19	21	40	21	0	1	0	5
Jack Valiquette	C	45	10	23	33	30	-8	1	1	1
Pat Boutette	C/RW	77	10	22	32	140	-1	2	0	2
Jim McKenny	D	46	10	19	29	19	-7	4	0	0
Bob Neely	LW	69	9	13	22	89	-15	0	0	0
Don Ashby	C	50	6	15	21	10	5	1	0	0
Rod Seiling	D	77	3	16	19	46	11	0	0	0
Blaine Stoughton	RW	43	6	11	17	8	-2	1	0	0
Greg Hubick	D	72	6	8	14	10	0	0	0	1
Claire Alexander	D	33	2	6	8	6	0	0	0	0
Dave Dunn	D	43	0	8	8	84	-5	0	0	0
Brian Glennie	D	69	0	8	8	75	10	0	0	0
Scott Garland	C	16	4	3	7	8	0	1	0	0
Doug Favell	G	3	0	0	0	0	0	0	0	0
Gord McRae	G	20	0	0	0	0	0	0	0	0
Wayne Thomas	G	64	0	0	0	18	0	0	0	0
Kurt Walker	D	5	0	0	0	49	-2	0	0	0

Goaltending

Player	MIN	GP	W	L	T	GA	GAA	SO
Wayne Thomas	3684	64	28	24	12	196	3.19	2
Gord McRae	956	20	6	5	2	59	3.70	0
Doug Favell	160	3	0	2	1	15	5.63	0
Team:	4800	80	34	31	15	270	3.38	2

=== Playoffs ===
Scoring

Player	Pos	GP	G	A	Pts	PIM	PPG	SHG	GWG
Darryl Sittler	C	10	5	7	12	19	2	0	1
Ian Turnbull	D	10	2	9	11	29	1	0	0
Lanny McDonald	RW	10	4	4	8	4	2	0	1
Borje Salming	D	10	3	4	7	9	1	0	0
Errol Thompson	LW	10	3	3	6	0	2	1	0
Claire Alexander	D	9	2	4	6	4	1	0	0
George Ferguson	C	10	2	4	6	2	0	0	1
Jim McKenny	D	6	2	3	5	2	1	0	1
Jack Valiquette	C	10	2	3	5	2	0	0	0
Pat Boutette	C/RW	10	1	4	5	16	0	0	0
Bob Neely	LW	10	3	1	4	7	2	0	0
Stan Weir	C	9	1	3	4	0	1	0	1
Scott Garland	C	7	1	2	3	35	1	0	0
Brian Glennie	D	6	0	1	1	15	0	0	0
Rod Seiling	D	10	0	1	1	6	0	0	0
Dave Dunn	D	3	0	0	0	17	0	0	0
Gord McRae	G	1	0	0	0	0	0	0	0
Wayne Thomas	G	10	0	0	0	0	0	0	0
Kurt Walker	D	6	0	0	0	24	0	0	0
Bob Warner	D	2	0	0	0	0	0	0	0
Tiger Williams	LW	10	0	0	0	75	0	0	0

Goaltending

Player	MIN	GP	W	L	GA	GAA	SO
Wayne Thomas	587	10	5	5	34	3.48	1
Gord McRae	13	1	0	0	1	4.62	0
Team:	600	10	5	5	35	3.50	1

Note:

Pos = Position;GP = Games played; G = Goals; A = Assists; Pts = Points; PIM = Penalty minutes; +/- = Plus/minus; PPG = Power-play goals; SHG = Short-handed goals; GWG = Game-winning goals
Pos = Position;GP = Games played; Min, TOI = Minutes played; W = Wins; L = Losses; T,T/OT = Ties; OTL = Overtime losses; GA = Goals-against; GAA = Goals-against average; SO = Shutouts; SA = Shots against; SV = Shots saved;SV% = Save percentage;

== Awards and records ==
=== Awards ===
- Borje Salming, defence, NHL 2nd All-Star Team
- Darryl Sittler, Molson Cup (most game star selections for Toronto Maple Leafs)
- Wayne Thomas, appeared in NHL All-Star Game

=== Records ===
- Darryl Sittler tied the playoff record for most goals in one game, with five against Philadelphia.

== Transactions ==
The Maple Leafs have been involved in the following transactions during the 1975–76 season.

=== Trades ===
June 17, 1975	To Montreal Canadiens 1st round pick in 1976 – Peter Lee	To Toronto Maple Leafs Wayne Thomas
June 20, 1975	To California Golden Seals Gary Sabourin	To Toronto Maple Leafs Stan Weir
June 26, 1975	To Montreal Canadiens Doug Jarvis	To Toronto Maple Leafs Greg Hubick
September 1, 1975	To Los Angeles Kings Cash	To Toronto Maple Leafs Tom Cassidy
June 1, 1976	To Cincinnati Stingers (WHA) Cash	To Toronto Maple Leafs Mike Pelyk; Randy Carlyle

=== Free agents ===
Player	Former team
Bob Warner	Undrafted free agent
Kurt Walker	Undrafted free agent
