= 1975–76 Atlanta Flames season =

NHL team season

1975–76 Atlanta Flames
- Division: 3rd Patrick
- Conference: 3rd Campbell
- 1975–76 record: 35–33–12
- Home record: 19–14–7
- Road record: 16–19–5
- Goals for: 262
- Goals against: 237

Team information
- General manager: Cliff Fletcher
- Coach: Fred Creighton
- Captain: Pat Quinn
- Alternate captains: None
- Arena: Omni Coliseum

Team leaders
- Goals: Curt Bennett (34)
- Assists: Tom Lysiak (51)
- Points: Tom Lysiak (82)
- Penalty minutes: Pat Quinn (134)
- Wins: Dan Bouchard (19)
- Goals against average: Dan Bouchard (2.54)

The 1975–76 Atlanta Flames season was the fourth season for the franchise. This season would mark a turning point for the franchise. After making the playoffs just once in their first three seasons, the Flames would miss the playoffs only once between 1976 and 1996 (that coming in 1991–92).

== Regular season ==
=== Final standings ===
Patrick Division
| | GP | W | L | T | GF | GA | Pts |
|---|---|---|---|---|---|---|---|
| **Philadelphia Flyers** | 80 | 51 | 13 | 16 | 348 | 209 | 118 |
| **New York Islanders** | 80 | 42 | 21 | 17 | 297 | 190 | 101 |
| **Atlanta Flames** | 80 | 35 | 33 | 12 | 262 | 237 | 82 |
| New York Rangers | 80 | 29 | 42 | 9 | 262 | 333 | 67 |

Note: GP = Games played, W = Wins, L = Losses, T = Ties, Pts = Points, GF = Goals for, GA = Goals against
Note: Teams that qualified for the playoffs are highlighted in bold.

=== Record vs. opponents ===
Patrick Division record vs. opponents

**Vs. Campbell Conference**

**Vs. Wales Conference**

**Vs. Patrick Division**

1975–76 NHL records
| Team | **ATL** | **NYI** | **NYR** | **PHI** | **Total** |
|---|---|---|---|---|---|
| Atlanta | — | 1–1–4 | 3–2–1 | 1–4–1 | **5–7–6** |
| N.Y. Islanders | 1–1–4 | — | 4–2 | 4–2 | **9–5–4** |
| N.Y. Rangers | 2–3–1 | 2–4 | — | 1–5 | **5–12–1** |
| Philadelphia | 4–1–1 | 2–4 | 5–1 | — | **11–6–1** |

**Vs. Smythe Division**

1975–76 NHL records
| Team | **CHI** | **KCS** | **MIN** | **STL** | **VAN** | **Total** |
|---|---|---|---|---|---|---|
| Atlanta | 2–2–1 | 5–0 | 4–1 | 1–3–1 | 3–0–2 | **15–6–4** |
| N.Y. Islanders | 3–1–1 | 2–0–3 | 4–1 | 4–0–1 | 0–3–2 | **13–5–7** |
| N.Y. Rangers | 2–0–3 | 4–1 | 4–1 | 3–2 | 3–1–1 | **16–5–4** |
| Philadelphia | 2–1–2 | 5–0 | 3–0–2 | 3–1–1 | 4–0–1 | **17–2–6** |

**Vs. Adams Division**

1975–76 NHL records
| Team | **BOS** | **BUF** | **CAL** | **TOR** | **Total** |
|---|---|---|---|---|---|
| Atlanta | 2–3 | 1–2–1 | 3–1 | 2–2 | **8–8–1** |
| N.Y. Islanders | 0–2–2 | 2–2 | 3–1 | 3–1–1 | **8–6–3** |
| N.Y. Rangers | 1–3 | 0–2–3 | 1–3 | 0–4 | **2–12–3** |
| Philadelphia | 1–2–1 | 3–0–1 | 4–0–1 | 3–0–1 | **11–2–4** |

**Vs. Norris Division**

1975–76 NHL records
| Team | **DET** | **LAK** | **MTL** | **PIT** | **WSH** | **Total** |
|---|---|---|---|---|---|---|
| Atlanta | 1–3 | 1–3 | 0–4 | 1–2–1 | 4–0 | **7–12–1** |
| N.Y. Islanders | 3–1 | 2–1–1 | 1–2–1 | 2–1–1 | 4–0 | **12–5–3** |
| N.Y. Rangers | 3–1 | 0–4 | 0–3–1 | 1–3 | 2–2 | **6–13–1** |
| Philadelphia | 2–2 | 2–0–2 | 2–1–1 | 3–0–1 | 3–0–1 | **12–3–5** |

== Schedule and results ==
1975–76 regular season
October

| Game | Result | Date | Score | Opponent | Record | Attendance |
|---|---|---|---|---|---|---|
| 1 | L | October 8, 1975 | 3–4 | California Golden Seals (1975–76) | 0–1–0 | 11,298 |
| 2 | L | October 10, 1975 | 1–2 | New York Rangers (1975–76) | 0–2–0 | 11,886 |
| 3 | L | October 15, 1975 | 1–3 | @ New York Rangers (1975–76) | 0–3–0 | 17,500 |
| 4 | L | October 17, 1975 | 0–2 | New York Islanders (1975–76) | 0–4–0 | 11,259 |
| 5 | W | October 18, 1975 | 5–3 | @ Kansas City Scouts (1975–76) | 1–4–0 | 7,036 |
| 6 | T | October 22, 1975 | 1–1 | St. Louis Blues (1975–76) | 1–4–1 | 10,086 |
| 7 | W | October 24, 1975 | 7–1 | Los Angeles Kings (1975–76) | 2–4–1 | 10,943 |
| 8 | L | October 25, 1975 | 3–7 | @ St. Louis Blues (1975–76) | 2–5–1 | 17,314 |
| 9 | W | October 28, 1975 | 3–2 | @ Vancouver Canucks (1975–76) | 3–5–1 | 15,570 |
| 10 | W | October 31, 1975 | 2–0 | @ California Golden Seals (1975–76) | 4–5–1 | 4,793 |

November

| Game | Result | Date | Score | Opponent | Record | Attendance |
|---|---|---|---|---|---|---|
| 11 | L | November 1, 1975 | 1–3 | @ Los Angeles Kings (1975–76) | 4–6–1 | 13,051 |
| 12 | L | November 5, 1975 | 1–3 | Montreal Canadiens (1975–76) | 4–7–1 | 11,120 |
| 13 | W | November 7, 1975 | 3–2 | Minnesota North Stars (1975–76) | 5–7–1 | 10,780 |
| 14 | L | November 9, 1975 | 3–6 | @ Detroit Red Wings (1975–76) | 5–8–1 | 9,321 |
| 15 | W | November 12, 1975 | 2–1 | Kansas City Scouts (1975–76) | 6–8–1 | 9,989 |
| 16 | W | November 14, 1975 | 4–1 | @ Washington Capitals (1975–76) | 7–8–1 | 9,206 |
| 17 | L | November 15, 1975 | 3–5 | Boston Bruins (1975–76) | 7–9–1 | 14,838 |
| 18 | T | November 18, 1975 | 2–2 | Vancouver Canucks (1975–76) | 7–9–2 | 10,490 |
| 19 | L | November 21, 1975 | 1–4 | Pittsburgh Penguins (1975–76) | 7–10–2 | 11,160 |
| 20 | W | November 22, 1975 | 6–3 | @ Minnesota North Stars (1975–76) | 8–10–2 | 9,463 |
| 21 | L | November 25, 1975 | 0–4 | Montreal Canadiens (1975–76) | 8–11–2 | 10,825 |
| 22 | L | November 26, 1975 | 3–7 | @ Philadelphia Flyers (1975–76) | 8–12–2 | 17,077 |
| 23 | W | November 28, 1975 | 6–3 | Toronto Maple Leafs (1975–76) | 9–12–2 | 12,664 |
| 24 | W | November 30, 1975 | 4–1 | @ California Golden Seals (1975–76) | 10–12–2 | 4,429 |

December

| Game | Result | Date | Score | Opponent | Record | Attendance |
|---|---|---|---|---|---|---|
| 25 | L | December 2, 1975 | 3–5 | @ Los Angeles Kings (1975–76) | 10–13–2 | 8,575 |
| 26 | W | December 5, 1975 | 6–2 | @ Vancouver Canucks (1975–76) | 11–13–2 | 15,570 |
| 27 | W | December 7, 1975 | 2–0 | @ Chicago Black Hawks (1975–76) | 12–13–2 | N/A |
| 28 | W | December 9, 1975 | 7–1 | Washington Capitals (1975–76) | 13–13–2 | 9,877 |
| 29 | T | December 12, 1975 | 3–3 | New York Islanders (1975–76) | 13–13–3 | 11,396 |
| 30 | W | December 14, 1975 | 7–4 | @ Buffalo Sabres (1975–76) | 14–13–3 | 16,433 |
| 31 | W | December 16, 1975 | 3–1 | Kansas City Scouts (1975–76) | 15–13–3 | 9,834 |
| 32 | L | December 17, 1975 | 2–3 | @ Minnesota North Stars (1975–76) | 15–14–3 | 8,106 |
| 33 | W | December 19, 1975 | 8–3 | New York Rangers (1975–76) | 16–14–3 | 11,673 |
| 34 | W | December 21, 1975 | 2–1 | @ Boston Bruins (1975–76) | 17–14–3 | 13,678 |
| 35 | T | December 23, 1975 | 2–2 | Philadelphia Flyers (1975–76) | 17–14–4 | 14,484 |
| 36 | W | December 26, 1975 | 4–3 | Pittsburgh Penguins (1975–76) | 18–14–4 | 13,120 |
| 37 | L | December 27, 1975 | 2–3 | @ Pittsburgh Penguins (1975–76) | 18–15–4 | 10,301 |
| 38 | L | December 29, 1975 | 2–6 | @ Toronto Maple Leafs (1975–76) | 18–16–4 | 16,485 |
| 39 | W | December 31, 1975 | 8–1 | @ New York Rangers (1975–76) | 19–16–4 | 17,500 |

January

| Game | Result | Date | Score | Opponent | Record | Attendance |
|---|---|---|---|---|---|---|
| 40 | W | January 2, 1976 | 7–1 | St. Louis Blues (1975–76) | 20–16–4 | 13,465 |
| 41 | W | January 3, 1976 | 6–4 | @ Kansas City Scouts (1975–76) | 21–16–4 | 9,139 |
| 42 | W | January 6, 1976 | 4–3 | Detroit Red Wings (1975–76) | 22–16–4 | 10,614 |
| 43 | T | January 9, 1976 | 1–1 | Chicago Black Hawks (1975–76) | 22–16–5 | 14,806 |
| 44 | W | January 11, 1976 | 5–2 | Vancouver Canucks (1975–76) | 23–16–5 | 11,467 |
| 45 | L | January 13, 1976 | 0–3 | Los Angeles Kings (1975–76) | 23–17–5 | 10,814 |
| 46 | L | January 15, 1976 | 3–5 | St. Louis Blues (1975–76) | 23–18–5 | 10,302 |
| 47 | T | January 17, 1976 | 2–2 | @ New York Islanders (1975–76) | 23–18–6 | 14,865 |
| 48 | L | January 18, 1976 | 2–4 | @ Montreal Canadiens (1975–76) | 23–19–6 | 15,459 |
| 49 | L | January 22, 1976 | 2–7 | @ Philadelphia Flyers (1975–76) | 23–20–6 | 17,077 |
| 50 | T | January 23, 1976 | 3–3 | Buffalo Sabres (1975–76) | 23–20–7 | 15,141 |
| 51 | W | January 27, 1976 | 8–4 | Philadelphia Flyers (1975–76) | 24–20–7 | 14,118 |
| 52 | L | January 28, 1976 | 3–7 | @ Chicago Black Hawks (1975–76) | 24–21–7 | N/A |
| 53 | L | January 30, 1976 | 2–4 | Boston Bruins (1975–76) | 24–22–7 | 15,141 |

February

| Game | Result | Date | Score | Opponent | Record | Attendance |
|---|---|---|---|---|---|---|
| 54 | L | February 1, 1976 | 3–5 | @ Boston Bruins (1975–76) | 24–23–7 | 14,574 |
| 55 | T | February 3, 1976 | 2–2 | @ New York Islanders (1975–76) | 24–23–8 | 14,865 |
| 56 | W | February 4, 1976 | 4–1 | California Golden Seals (1975–76) | 25–23–8 | 10,169 |
| 57 | L | February 6, 1976 | 1–2 | Chicago Black Hawks (1975–76) | 25–24–8 | 12,921 |
| 58 | W | February 11, 1976 | 5–2 | Toronto Maple Leafs (1975–76) | 26–24–8 | N/A |
| 59 | L | February 13, 1976 | 2–3 | Buffalo Sabres (1975–76) | 26–25–8 | 13,756 |
| 60 | L | February 14, 1976 | 3–5 | @ St. Louis Blues (1975–76) | 26–26–8 | 17,973 |
| 61 | L | February 19, 1976 | 1–3 | @ Buffalo Sabres (1975–76) | 26–27–8 | 16,433 |
| 62 | W | February 20, 1976 | 3–1 | @ Kansas City Scouts (1975–76) | 27–27–8 | 6,842 |
| 63 | L | February 23, 1976 | 1–7 | @ Toronto Maple Leafs (1975–76) | 27–28–8 | 16,461 |
| 64 | T | February 25, 1976 | 3–3 | @ Pittsburgh Penguins (1975–76) | 27–28–9 | 9,127 |
| 65 | L | February 28, 1976 | 2–3 | @ Montreal Canadiens (1975–76) | 27–29–9 | 17,008 |

March

| Game | Result | Date | Score | Opponent | Record | Attendance |
|---|---|---|---|---|---|---|
| 66 | L | March 3, 1976 | 2–3 | Detroit Red Wings (1975–76) | 27–30–9 | 10,854 |
| 67 | W | March 5, 1976 | 8–3 | New York Rangers (1975–76) | 28–30–9 | 13,323 |
| 68 | T | March 7, 1976 | 6–6 | @ New York Rangers (1975–76) | 28–30–10 | 17,500 |
| 69 | W | March 9, 1976 | 9–0 | Boston Bruins (1975–76) | 29–30–10 | 11,269 |
| 70 | W | March 10, 1976 | 4–1 | @ Minnesota North Stars (1975–76) | 30–30–10 | 8,280 |
| 71 | W | March 12, 1976 | 4–1 | Washington Capitals (1975–76) | 31–30–10 | 12,154 |
| 72 | L | March 14, 1976 | 1–6 | @ Philadelphia Flyers (1975–76) | 31–31–10 | 17,077 |
| 73 | L | March 16, 1976 | 2–4 | Philadelphia Flyers (1975–76) | 31–32–10 | 15,184 |
| 74 | T | March 19, 1976 | 2–2 | Vancouver Canucks (1975–76) | 31–32–11 | 12,930 |
| 75 | W | March 24, 1976 | 7–2 | @ Chicago Black Hawks (1975–76) | 32–32–11 | N/A |
| 76 | L | March 27, 1976 | 0–8 | @ Detroit Red Wings (1975–76) | 32–33–11 | 11,540 |
| 77 | W | March 28, 1976 | 3–1 | @ Washington Capitals (1975–76) | 33–33–11 | 9,563 |

April

| Game | Result | Date | Score | Opponent | Record | Attendance |
|---|---|---|---|---|---|---|
| 78 | T | April 1, 1976 | 1–1 | @ New York Islanders (1975–76) | 33–33–12 | 14,865 |
| 79 | W | April 2, 1976 | 4–2 | Minnesota North Stars (1975–76) | 34–33–12 | 11,876 |
| 80 | W | April 4, 1976 | 5–2 | New York Islanders (1975–76) | 35–33–12 | 11,798 |

Legend: Win (2 points) Loss (0 points) Tie (1 point)

== Playoffs ==
Atlanta qualified for the post-season for the second time in franchise history, and would face the Los Angeles Kings in a best-of-three preliminary round series. The Kings finished with a 38–33–9 record, earning 85 points and second place in the Norris Division. They finished the season with three more points than the Flames.

The series opened at The Forum in Inglewood, California, and the Kings scored in the first minute of play, as Tom Williams beat goaltender Dan Bouchard to give Los Angeles a 1–0 lead. The Kings doubled their lead in the second period when Bob Nevin scored. In the third period, the Flames cut the Kings lead to 2–1 after a goal by Barry Gibbs, however, that's as close as Atlanta would get, as Los Angeles held on for the 2–1 victory.

The second game was played at the Omni Coliseum, as the Flames needed a win to force a third and deciding game. Both goaltenders played great games, however, the Kings Bob Berry scored with 1:44 remaining in the third period, as Los Angeles held on to beat the Flames 1–0. Kings goaltender Rogie Vachon made 27 saves for the shutout.

1976 Stanley Cup playoffs
Preliminary Round vs. Los Angeles Kings – Kings win 2–0

| Game | Date | Visitor | Score | Home | Series | Attendance |
|---|---|---|---|---|---|---|
| 1 | April 6 | Atlanta Flames | 1–2 | Los Angeles Kings | 0–1 | 12,023 |
| 2 | April 8 | Los Angeles Kings | 1–0 | Atlanta Flames | 0–2 | 10,450 |

Legend: Win Loss

== Player statistics ==
=== Skaters ===
Note: GP = Games played; G = Goals; A = Assists; Pts = Points; PIM = Penalty minutes

| | | Regular season | | | | | Playoffs |
| Player | # | GP | G | A | Pts | PIM | GP | G | A | Pts | PIM |
|---|---|---|---|---|---|---|---|---|---|---|---|
| Tom Lysiak | 12 | 80 | 31 | 51 | 82 | 60 | 2 | 0 | 0 | 0 | 2 |
| Curt Bennett | 5 | 80 | 34 | 31 | 65 | 61 | 2 | 0 | 0 | 0 | 4 |
| Hilliard Graves | 17 | 80 | 19 | 30 | 49 | 16 | 2 | 0 | 0 | 0 | 0 |
| Claude St. Sauveur | 11 | 79 | 24 | 24 | 48 | 23 | 2 | 0 | 0 | 0 | 0 |
| Eric Vail | 25 | 60 | 16 | 31 | 47 | 34 | 2 | 0 | 0 | 0 | 0 |
| Bill Flett | 9 | 78 | 23 | 17 | 40 | 30 | 2 | 0 | 0 | 0 | 0 |
| Dave Kryskow | 20/8 | 79 | 15 | 25 | 40 | 65 | 2 | 0 | 0 | 0 | 2 |
| Rey Comeau | 18 | 79 | 17 | 22 | 39 | 42 | – | – | – | – | – |
| Randy Manery | 7 | 80 | 7 | 32 | 39 | 42 | 2 | 0 | 0 | 0 | 0 |
| Larry Romanchych | 21 | 67 | 16 | 19 | 35 | 8 | 2 | 0 | 0 | 0 | 0 |
| Barry Gibbs | 2 | 76 | 8 | 21 | 29 | 92 | 2 | 1 | 0 | 1 | 2 |
| Bill Clement^{†} | 10 | 31 | 13 | 14 | 27 | 29 | 2 | 0 | 1 | 1 | 0 |
| Ed Kea | 19 | 78 | 8 | 19 | 27 | 101 | 2 | 0 | 0 | 0 | 7 |
| Gerry Meehan^{‡} | 10 | 48 | 7 | 20 | 27 | 8 | – | – | – | – | – |
| Tim Ecclestone | 14 | 69 | 6 | 21 | 27 | 30 | – | – | – | – | – |
| Larry Carriere | 23 | 75 | 4 | 15 | 19 | 96 | 2 | 0 | 0 | 0 | 2 |
| Jean Lemieux^{‡} | 6 | 33 | 4 | 9 | 13 | 10 | – | – | – | – | – |
| Pat Quinn | 3 | 80 | 2 | 11 | 13 | 134 | 2 | 0 | 1 | 1 | 2 |
| Ken Houston | 24/6 | 38 | 5 | 6 | 11 | 11 | 2 | 0 | 0 | 0 | 0 |
| Bob Leiter | 16 | 26 | 2 | 3 | 5 | 4 | – | – | – | – | – |
| Guy Chouinard | 16 | 4 | 0 | 2 | 2 | 2 | 2 | 0 | 0 | 0 | 0 |
| Richard Mulhern | 4 | 12 | 1 | 0 | 1 | 4 | – | – | – | – | – |
| Richard Lemieux^{†} | 20 | 1 | 0 | 1 | 1 | 0 | 2 | 0 | 0 | 0 | 0 |
| Cam Botting | 24 | 2 | 0 | 1 | 1 | 0 | – | – | – | – | – |
| Phil Myre | 1 | 37 | 0 | 1 | 1 | 0 | – | – | – | – | – |
| Dan Bouchard | 30 | 47 | 0 | 1 | 1 | 10 | 2 |
| Buster Harvey^{‡} | 8 | 1 | 0 | 0 | 0 | 0 | – | – | – | – | – |
| Noel Price | 4 | 3 | 0 | 0 | 0 | 2 | – | – | – | – | – |
| Pat Ribble | 23 | 3 | 0 | 0 | 0 | 0 | – | – | – | – | – |
| Willi Plett | 22 | 4 | 0 | 0 | 0 | 0 | – | – | – | – | – |
| Rick Bowness | 15 | 5 | 0 | 0 | 0 | 0 | – | – | – | – | – |

^{†}Denotes player spent time with another team before joining Atlanta. Stats reflect time with the Flames only.
^{‡}Traded mid-season

=== Goaltending ===
Note: GP = Games played; TOI = Time on ice (minutes); W = Wins; L = Losses; OT = Overtime/shootout losses; GA = Goals against; SO = Shutouts; GAA = Goals against average

| | | Regular season | | | | | | | | Playoffs |
| Player | # | GP | TOI | W | L | T | GA | SO | GAA | GP | TOI | W | L | GA | SO | GAA |
|---|---|---|---|---|---|---|---|---|---|---|---|---|---|---|---|---|
| Dan Bouchard | 30 | 47 | 2671 | 19 | 17 | 8 | 113 | 2 | 2.54 | 2 | 120 | 0 | 2 | 3 | 0 | 1.50 |
| Phil Myre | 1 | 37 | 2129 | 16 | 16 | 4 | 123 | 1 | 3.47 | – | – | – | – | – | – | – |

== Transactions ==
The Flames were involved in the following transactions during the 1975–76 season.

=== Trades ===
| June 5, 1975 | To Atlanta Flames ----Dave Kryskow | To Detroit Red Wings ----Bryan Hextall Jr. |
| September 9, 1975 | To Atlanta Flames ----Curt Ridley | To New York Rangers ----Jerry Byers |
| September 23, 1975 | To Atlanta Flames ----Rights to Claude St. Sauveur | To California Golden Seals ----Cash |
| October 1, 1975 | To Atlanta Flames ----Larry Carriere; 1st round pick in 1976 (traded to Washington Capitals; Capitals selected Greg Carroll); Cash | To Buffalo Sabres ----Jacques Richard |
| October 13, 1975 | To Atlanta Flames ----Richard Lemieux; Future considerations | To Kansas City Scouts ----Buster Harvey |
| January 20, 1976 | To Atlanta Flames ----1st round pick in 1976 (Dave Shand) | To Vancouver Canucks ----Curt Ridley |
| January 22, 1976 | To Atlanta Flames ----Bill Clement | To Washington Capitals ----Jean Lemieux; Gerry Meehan; Sabres' 1st round pick in 1976 (Greg Carroll) |

=== Free agents ===
| Player / Former team | Player / New team |

=== Waivers ===
| Player | Former team |
| RW Bill Flett | Toronto Maple Leafs |

== Draft picks ==
| Round | Pick | Player | Nationality | College/Junior/Club team |
|---|---|---|---|---|
| 1 | 8. | Richard Mulhern (D) | Canada | Sherbrooke Beavers (QMJHL) |
| 2 | 26. | Rick Bowness (RW) | Canada | Montreal Bleu Blanc Rouge (QMJHL) |
| 4 | 62. | Dale Ross (LW) | Canada | Ottawa 67s (OHA) |
| 5 | 80. | Willi Plett (RW) | Paraguay | St. Catharines Black Hawks (OHA) |
| 6 | 98. | Paul Heaver (D) | United Kingdom | Oshawa Generals (OHA) |
| 7 | 116. | Dale McMullin (LW) | Canada | Brandon Wheat Kings (WCHL) |
| 8 | 134. | Rick Piche (D) | Canada | Brandon Wheat Kings (WCHL) |
| 9 | 150. | Nick Sanza (G) | Canada | Sherbrooke Beavers (QMJHL) |
| 10 | 167. | Brian O'Connell (G) | Canada | Saint Louis University (NCAA) |
| 11 | 181. | Joe Augustine (D) | United States | Austin Mavericks (MidJHL) |
| 12 | 192. | Torbjorn Nilsson (RW) | Sweden | Skelleftea AIK (Grundserien) |
| 13 | 216. | Gary Gill (LW) | Canada | Sault Ste. Marie Greyhounds (OHA) |
