= 1975–76 Boston Bruins season =

NHL team season

1975–76 Boston Bruins
- Adams Division champions
- Division: 1st Adams
- Conference: 2nd Wales
- 1975–76 record: 48–15–17
- Home record: 27–5–8
- Road record: 21–10–9
- Goals for: 313
- Goals against: 237

Team information
- General manager: Harry Sinden
- Coach: Don Cherry
- Captain: Johnny Bucyk
- Alternate captains: None
- Arena: Boston Garden

Team leaders
- Goals: Johnny Bucyk (36)
- Assists: Jean Ratelle (59)
- Points: Jean Ratelle (90)
- Penalty minutes: Terry O'Reilly (150)
- Wins: Gilles Gilbert (33)
- Goals against average: Gerry Cheevers (2.73)

The 1975–76 Boston Bruins season was the Bruins' 52nd season in the NHL. The season involved trading Phil Esposito to the New York Rangers, while a knee injury limited Bobby Orr to 10 games.

== Offseason ==
=== NHL draft ===
Round	#	Player	Nationality	College/Junior/Club team
1	14	Doug Halward (D)	Canada	Peterborough Petes (OHA)
2	32	Barry Smith (C)	Canada	New Westminster Bruins (WCHL)
4	60	Rick Adduono (C)	Canada	St. Catharines Black Hawks (OMJHL)
4	68	Denis Daigle (LW)	Canada	Montreal Bleu Blanc Rouge (QMJHL)
5	86	Stan Jonathan (LW)	Canada	Peterborough Petes (OMJHL)
6	104	Matti Hagman (C)	Finland	HIFK (Finland)
7	122	Gary Carr (G)	Canada	Toronto Marlboros (OMJHL)
8	140	Bo Berglund (LW)	Sweden	Modo AIK (Sweden)
9	156	Joe Rando (D)	United States	University of New Hampshire (ECAC)
10	171	Kevin Nugent (RW)	United States	University of Notre Dame (WCHA)

== Regular season ==
=== Season standings ===
Adams Division
	GP	W	L	T	GF	GA	Pts
**Boston Bruins**	80	48	15	17	313	237	113
**Buffalo Sabres**	80	46	21	13	339	240	105
**Toronto Maple Leafs**	80	34	31	15	294	276	83
California Golden Seals	80	27	42	11	250	278	65

Note: GP = Games played, W = Wins, L = Losses, T = Ties, Pts = Points, GF = Goals for, GA = Goals against
Note: Teams that qualified for the playoffs are highlighted in bold.

=== Record vs. opponents ===
Adams Division record vs. opponents

**Vs. Wales Conference**

**Vs. Campbell Conference**

**Vs. Adams Division**

1975–76 NHL records
Team	**BOS**	**BUF**	**CAL**	**TOR**	**Total**
Boston	—	3–2–1	5–1	4–1–1	**12–4–2**
Buffalo	2–3–1	—	5–0–1	4–2	**11–5–2**
California	1–5	0–5–1	—	1–3–2	**2–13–3**
Toronto	1–4–1	2–4	3–1–2	—	**6–9–3**

**Vs. Norris Division**

1975–76 NHL records
Team	**DET**	**LAK**	**MTL**	**PIT**	**WSH**	**Total**
Boston	3–0–2	4–1	0–3–2	3–0–2	4–0–1	**14–4–7**
Buffalo	4–1	3–2	2–3	4–1	4–0–1	**17–7–1**
California	3–1–1	2–3	0–5	2–2–1	3–1–1	**10–12–3**
Toronto	2–1–2	3–1–1	1–3–1	1–4	4–0–1	**11–9–5**

**Vs. Patrick Division**

1975–76 NHL records
Team	**ATL**	**NYI**	**NYR**	**PHI**	**Total**
Boston	3–2	2–0–2	3–1	2–1–1	**10–4–3**
Buffalo	2–1–1	2–2	2–0–3	0–3–1	**6–6–5**
California	1–3	1–3	3–1	0–4–1	**5–11–1**
Toronto	2–2	1–3–1	4–0	0–3–1	**7–8–2**

**Vs. Smythe Division**

1975–76 NHL records
Team	**CHI**	**KCS**	**MIN**	**STL**	**VAN**	**Total**
Boston	3–0–1	2–1–1	3–0–1	2–1–1	2–1–1	**12–3–5**
Buffalo	2–0–2	3–0–1	4–0	2–1–1	1–2–1	**12–3–5**
California	2–1–1	1–2–1	3–1	2–1–1	2–1–1	**10–6–4**
Toronto	1–2–1	3–0–1	3–1	2–0–2	1–2–1	**10–5–5**

== Schedule and results ==
1975–76 regular season
October

Game	Result	Date	Score	Opponent	Record
1	L	October 9, 1975	4–9	Montreal Canadiens (1975–76)	0–1–0
2	T	October 12, 1975	3–3	New York Islanders (1975–76)	0–1–1
3	T	October 16, 1975	2–2	@ Detroit Red Wings (1975–76)	0–1–2
4	W	October 18, 1975	5–2	@ New York Islanders (1975–76)	1–1–2
5	W	October 19, 1975	3–0	Toronto Maple Leafs (1975–76)	2–1–2
6	L	October 23, 1975	2–3	Kansas City Scouts (1975–76)	2–2–2
7	L	October 25, 1975	2–6	@ Montreal Canadiens (1975–76)	2–3–2
8	W	October 26, 1975	7–3	Detroit Red Wings (1975–76)	3–3–2
9	W	October 30, 1975	3–2	St. Louis Blues (1975–76)	4–3–2

November

Game	Result	Date	Score	Opponent	Record
10	L	November 1, 1975	1–8	@ Philadelphia Flyers (1975–76)	4–4–2
11	W	November 2, 1975	5–0	California Golden Seals (1975–76)	5–4–2
12	L	November 5, 1975	0–4	@ Buffalo Sabres (1975–76)	5–5–2
13	L	November 8, 1975	2–4	@ Vancouver Canucks (1975–76)	5–6–2
14	W	November 9, 1975	6–3	@ California Golden Seals (1975–76)	6–6–2
15	W	November 13, 1975	6–0	Minnesota North Stars (1975–76)	7–6–2
16	W	November 15, 1975	5–3	@ Atlanta Flames (1975–76)	8–6–2
17	W	November 16, 1975	4–2	Kansas City Scouts (1975–76)	9–6–2
18	T	November 19, 1975	3–3	@ Detroit Red Wings (1975–76)	9–6–3
19	T	November 20, 1975	2–2	New York Islanders (1975–76)	9–6–4
20	T	November 23, 1975	3–3	Toronto Maple Leafs (1975–76)	9–6–5
21	W	November 25, 1975	4–2	Los Angeles Kings (1975–76)	10–6–5
22	W	November 26, 1975	6–4	@ New York Rangers (1975–76)	11–6–5
23	T	November 29, 1975	4–4	@ Chicago Black Hawks (1975–76)	11–6–6
24	W	November 30, 1975	4–2	Pittsburgh Penguins (1975–76)	12–6–6

December

Game	Result	Date	Score	Opponent	Record
25	W	December 4, 1975	3–2	Washington Capitals (1975–76)	13–6–6
26	W	December 6, 1975	4–2	@ Toronto Maple Leafs (1975–76)	14–6–6
27	T	December 7, 1975	2–2	Montreal Canadiens (1975–76)	14–6–7
28	L	December 11, 1975	1–5	New York Rangers (1975–76)	14–7–7
29	T	December 13, 1975	4–4	@ Pittsburgh Penguins (1975–76)	14–7–8
30	W	December 14, 1975	3–2	Vancouver Canucks (1975–76)	15–7–8
31	W	December 17, 1975	3–2	@ Washington Capitals (1975–76)	16–7–8
32	W	December 20, 1975	5–3	Buffalo Sabres (1975–76)	17–7–8
33	L	December 21, 1975	1–2	Atlanta Flames (1975–76)	17–8–8
34	L	December 23, 1975	3–4	Los Angeles Kings (1975–76)	17–9–8
35	W	December 26, 1975	6–3	@ Buffalo Sabres (1975–76)	18–9–8
36	W	December 28, 1975	4–2	@ Philadelphia Flyers (1975–76)	19–9–8
37	W	December 31, 1975	6–1	@ Minnesota North Stars (1975–76)	20–9–8

January

Game	Result	Date	Score	Opponent	Record
38	T	January 2, 1976	4–4	@ Vancouver Canucks (1975–76)	20–9–9
39	W	January 3, 1976	3–0	@ Los Angeles Kings (1975–76)	21–9–9
40	W	January 10, 1976	3–2	California Golden Seals (1975–76)	22–9–9
41	W	January 11, 1976	7–4	@ Washington Capitals (1975–76)	23–9–9
42	W	January 13, 1976	6–2	Pittsburgh Penguins (1975–76)	24–9–9
43	W	January 15, 1976	4–0	Los Angeles Kings (1975–76)	25–9–9
44	L	January 17, 1976	5–7	@ St. Louis Blues (1975–76)	25–10–9
45	W	January 22, 1976	5–3	Buffalo Sabres (1975–76)	26–10–9
46	W	January 24, 1976	6–1	@ Detroit Red Wings (1975–76)	27–10–9
47	W	January 25, 1976	5–3	Philadelphia Flyers (1975–76)	28–10–9
48	W	January 29, 1976	5–3	Chicago Black Hawks (1975–76)	29–10–9
49	W	January 30, 1976	4–2	@ Atlanta Flames (1975–76)	30–10–9

February

Game	Result	Date	Score	Opponent	Record
50	W	February 1, 1976	5–3	Atlanta Flames (1975–76)	31–10–9
51	W	February 5, 1976	5–1	Pittsburgh Penguins (1975–76)	32–10–9
52	L	February 7, 1976	4–11	@ Toronto Maple Leafs (1975–76)	32–11–9
53	W	February 8, 1976	7–0	Detroit Red Wings (1975–76)	33–11–9
54	W	February 11, 1976	5–2	@ Minnesota North Stars (1975–76)	34–11–9
55	W	February 13, 1976	6–5	@ California Golden Seals (1975–76)	35–11–9
56	W	February 15, 1976	4–1	@ Chicago Black Hawks (1975–76)	36–11–9
57	T	February 18, 1976	3–3	@ Kansas City Scouts (1975–76)	36–11–10
58	W	February 21, 1976	2–1	@ New York Islanders (1975–76)	37–11–10
59	W	February 22, 1976	5–2	@ New York Rangers (1975–76)	38–11–10
60	W	February 26, 1976	4–2	St. Louis Blues (1975–76)	39–11–10
61	T	February 27, 1976	3–3	@ Washington Capitals (1975–76)	39–11–11
62	W	February 29, 1976	5–3	Vancouver Canucks (1975–76)	40–11–11

March

Game	Result	Date	Score	Opponent	Record
63	W	March 3, 1976	5–3	@ Los Angeles Kings (1975–76)	41–11–11
64	L	March 5, 1976	3–4	@ California Golden Seals (1975–76)	41–12–11
65	W	March 7, 1976	4–3	Washington Capitals (1975–76)	42–12–11
66	L	March 9, 1976	0–9	@ Atlanta Flames (1975–76)	42–13–11
67	W	March 11, 1976	6–2	Toronto Maple Leafs (1975–76)	43–13–11
68	L	March 13, 1976	2–4	@ Montreal Canadiens (1975–76)	43–14–11
69	W	March 14, 1976	4–2	California Golden Seals (1975–76)	44–14–11
70	T	March 16, 1976	3–3	@ St. Louis Blues (1975–76)	44–14–12
71	W	March 18, 1976	5–2	@ Kansas City Scouts (1975–76)	45–14–12
72	W	March 20, 1976	8–1	New York Rangers (1975–76)	46–14–12
73	T	March 24, 1976	5–5	@ Pittsburgh Penguins (1975–76)	46–14–13
74	W	March 25, 1976	4–2	Chicago Black Hawks (1975–76)	47–14–13
75	T	March 27, 1976	4–4	Philadelphia Flyers (1975–76)	47–14–14
76	T	March 28, 1976	2–2	Montreal Canadiens (1975–76)	47–14–15
77	T	March 30, 1976	4–4	Buffalo Sabres (1975–76)	47–14–16

April

Game	Result	Date	Score	Opponent	Record
78	L	April 1, 1976	2–7	@ Buffalo Sabres (1975–76)	47–15–16
79	W	April 3, 1976	4–2	@ Toronto Maple Leafs (1975–76)	48–15–16
80	T	April 4, 1976	2–2	Minnesota North Stars (1975–76)	48–15–17

Legend: Win (2 points) Loss (0 points) Tie (1 point)

== Player statistics ==
=== Regular season ===
Scoring

Player	Pos	GP	G	A	Pts	PIM	+/-	PPG	SHG	GWG
Jean Ratelle	C	67	31	59	90	16	17	15	1	3
John Bucyk	LW	77	36	47	83	20	22	13	0	9
Gregg Sheppard	C	70	31	43	74	28	24	5	2	4
Wayne Cashman	LW	80	28	43	71	87	30	9	0	6
Bobby Schmautz	RW	75	28	34	62	116	13	7	0	7
Ken Hodge	RW	72	25	36	61	42	19	8	0	5
Brad Park	D	43	16	37	53	95	23	7	1	2
Terry O'Reilly	RW	80	23	27	50	150	3	2	0	2
Andre Savard	C	79	17	23	40	60	4	0	0	3
Don Marcotte	LW	58	16	20	36	24	15	1	0	2
Dallas Smith	D	77	7	25	32	103	42	0	0	0
Dave Forbes	LW	79	16	13	29	52	15	0	4	1
Doug Gibson	C	50	7	18	25	0	8	1	0	1
Darryl Edestrand	D	77	4	17	21	103	7	1	0	1
Bobby Orr	D	10	5	13	18	22	10	3	1	0
Phil Esposito	C	12	6	10	16	8	-1	3	0	0
Hank Nowak	LW	66	7	3	10	41	-1	0	0	1
Joe Zanussi	D	60	1	7	8	30	2	0	0	0
Al Sims	D	48	4	3	7	43	6	0	0	0
Carol Vadnais	D	12	2	5	7	17	1	1	0	0
Gary Doak	D	58	1	6	7	60	25	0	0	1
Doug Halward	D	22	1	5	6	6	-4	1	0	0
Barry Smith	C	19	1	0	1	2	-5	0	0	0
Earl Anderson	RW	5	0	1	1	2	-2	0	0	0
Gordie Clark	RW	7	0	1	1	0	-5	0	0	0
Kent Ruhnke	RW	2	0	1	1	0	1	0	0	0
Al Simmons	D	7	0	1	1	21	0	0	0	0
Rick Adduono	C	1	0	0	0	0	-1	0	0	0
Gerry Cheevers	G	15	0	0	0	2	0	0	0	0
Gilles Gilbert	G	55	0	0	0	18	0	0	0	0
Stan Jonathan	LW	1	0	0	0	0	0	0	0	0
Steve Langdon	LW	4	0	0	0	2	-1	0	0	0
Ray Maluta	D	2	0	0	0	2	-3	0	0	0
Mike Milbury	D	3	0	0	0	9	1	0	0	0
Paul O'Neil	C/RW	1	0	0	0	0	-1	0	0	0
Dave Reece	G	14	0	0	0	0	0	0	0	0

Goaltending

Player	MIN	GP	W	L	T	GA	GAA	SO
Gilles Gilbert	3123	55	33	8	10	151	2.90	3
Gerry Cheevers	900	15	8	2	5	41	2.73	1
Dave Reece	777	14	7	5	2	43	3.32	2
Team:	4800	80	48	15	17	235	2.94	6

=== Playoffs ===
Scoring

Player	Pos	GP	G	A	Pts	PIM	PPG	SHG	GWG
Jean Ratelle	C	12	8	8	16	4	5	0	1
Gregg Sheppard	C	12	5	6	11	6	1	0	1
Brad Park	D	11	3	8	11	14	1	1	0
Ken Hodge	RW	12	4	6	10	4	4	0	1
Bobby Schmautz	RW	11	2	8	10	13	0	0	1
John Bucyk	LW	12	2	7	9	0	2	0	0
Don Marcotte	LW	12	4	2	6	8	1	0	0
Wayne Cashman	LW	11	1	5	6	16	0	0	0
Andre Savard	C	12	1	4	5	9	0	0	0
Terry O'Reilly	RW	12	3	1	4	25	0	0	0
Dallas Smith	D	11	2	2	4	19	0	0	1
Darryl Edestrand	D	12	1	3	4	23	0	0	0
Dave Forbes	LW	12	1	1	2	5	0	1	0
Gary Doak	D	12	1	0	1	22	0	0	0
Joe Zanussi	D	4	0	1	1	2	0	0	0
Gerry Cheevers	G	6	0	0	0	0	0	0	0
Gordie Clark	RW	1	0	0	0	0	0	0	0
Gilles Gilbert	G	6	0	0	0	2	0	0	0
Doug Halward	D	1	0	0	0	0	0	0	0
Steve Langdon	LW	4	0	0	0	0	0	0	0
Ray Maluta	D	2	0	0	0	0	0	0	0
Mike Milbury	D	11	0	0	0	29	0	0	0
Hank Nowak	LW	10	0	0	0	8	0	0	0
Al Sims	D	1	0	0	0	0	0	0	0

Goaltending

Player	MIN	GP	W	L	GA	GAA	SO
Gilles Gilbert	360	6	3	3	19	3.17	2
Gerry Cheevers	392	6	2	4	14	2.14	1
Team:	752	12	5	7	33	2.63	3

Note:

Pos = Position;GP = Games played; G = Goals; A = Assists; Pts = Points; PIM = Penalty minutes; +/- = Plus/minus; PPG = Power-play goals; SHG = Short-handed goals; GWG = Game-winning goals
Pos = Position;GP = Games played; Min, TOI = Minutes played; W = Wins; L = Losses; T,T/OT = Ties; OTL = Overtime losses; GA = Goals-against; GAA = Goals-against average; SO = Shutouts; SA = Shots against; SV = Shots saved;SV% = Save percentage;

== Awards and honors ==
- Jack Adams Award: || Don Cherry
- Lady Byng Memorial Trophy: || Jean Ratelle
- Brad Park, Defenceman, NHL First Team All-Star
