= 1975–76 Detroit Red Wings season =

Sports season

1975–76 Detroit Red Wings
- Division: 4th Norris
- Conference: 8th Wales
- 1975–76 record: 26–44–10
- Home record: 17–15–8
- Road record: 9–29–2
- Goals for: 226
- Goals against: 300

Team information
- General manager: Alex Delvecchio
- Coach: Doug Barkley (Oct–Dec); Alex Delvecchio (Dec-Apr)
- Captain: Danny Grant and Terry Harper
- Alternate captains: None
- Arena: Detroit Olympia

Team leaders
- Goals: Michel Bergeron (32)
- Assists: Walt McKechnie (56)
- Points: Walt McKechnie (82)
- Penalty minutes: Bryan Watson (322)
- Wins: Ed Giacomin (12)
- Goals against average: Ed Giacomin (3.45)

The 1975–76 Detroit Red Wings season was the 50th season of competition for the Detroit franchise and 42nd as the Red Wings. The Wings finished fourth in the Norris Division and did not qualify for the playoffs for the sixth straight year for the first time in franchise history.

== Regular season ==
=== Final standings ===
Norris Division
	GP	W	L	T	GF	GA	Pts
**Montreal Canadiens**	80	58	11	11	337	174	127
**Los Angeles Kings**	80	38	33	9	263	265	85
**Pittsburgh Penguins**	80	35	33	12	339	303	82
Detroit Red Wings	80	26	44	10	226	300	62
Washington Capitals	80	11	59	10	224	394	32

Note: GP = Games played, W = Wins, L = Losses, T = Ties, Pts = Points, GF = Goals for, GA = Goals against

Note: Teams that qualified for the playoffs are highlighted in bold.

=== Record vs. opponents ===
Norris Division record vs. opponents

**Vs. Wales Conference**

**Vs. Campbell Conference**

**Vs. Norris Division**

1975–76 NHL records
Team	**DET**	**LAK**	**MTL**	**PIT**	**WSH**	**Total**
Detroit	—	2–3–1	0–5–1	1–4–1	3–3	**6–15–3**
Los Angeles	3–2–1	—	2–3–1	1–5	4–1–1	**10–11–3**
Montreal	5–0–1	3–2–1	—	6–0	6–0	**20–2–2**
Pittsburgh	4–1–1	5–1	0–6	—	4–1–1	**13–9–2**
Washington	3–3	1–4–1	0–6	1–4–1	—	**5–17–2**

**Vs. Adams Division**

1975–76 NHL records
Team	**BOS**	**BUF**	**CAL**	**TOR**	**Total**
Detroit	0–3–2	1–4	1–3–1	1–2–2	**3–12–5**
Los Angeles	1–4	2–3	3–2	1–3–1	**7–12–1**
Montreal	3–0–2	3–2	5–0	3–1–1	**14–3–3**
Pittsburgh	0–3–2	1–4	2–2–1	4–1	**7–10–3**
Washington	0–4–1	0–4–1	1–3–1	0–4–1	**1–15–4**

**Vs. Patrick Division**

1975–76 NHL records
Team	**ATL**	**NYI**	**NYR**	**PHI**	**Total**
Detroit	3–1	1–3	1–3	2–2	**7–9**
Los Angeles	3–1	1–2–1	4–0	0–2–2	**8–5–3**
Montreal	4–0	2–1–1	3–0–1	1–2–1	**10–3–3**
Pittsburgh	2–1–1	1–2–1	3–1	0–3–1	**6–7–3**
Washington	0–4	0–4	2–2	0–3–1	**2–13–1**

**Vs. Smythe Division**

1975–76 NHL records
Team	**CHI**	**KCS**	**MIN**	**STL**	**VAN**	**Total**
Detroit	2–1–1	3–1	3–1	2–1–1	0–4	**10–8–2**
Los Angeles	2–2	4–0	2–1–1	2–1–1	3–1	**13–5–2**
Montreal	2–1–1	3–1	4–0	4–0	1–1–2	**14–3–3**
Pittsburgh	1–2–1	2–1–1	2–1–1	2–2	2–1–1	**9–7–4**
Washington	2–2	1–2–1	0–2–2	0–4	0–4	**3–14–3**

== Schedule and results ==
1975–76 regular season
October

Game	Result	Date	Score	Opponent	Record
1	T	October 8, 1975	1–1	St. Louis Blues (1975–76)	0–0–1
2	L	October 9, 1975	0–4	@ Buffalo Sabres (1975–76)	0–1–1
3	L	October 11, 1975	2–5	California Golden Seals (1975–76)	0–2–1
4	T	October 15, 1975	4–4	@ Chicago Black Hawks (1975–76)	0–2–2
5	T	October 16, 1975	2–2	Boston Bruins (1975–76)	0–2–3
6	L	October 18, 1975	1–6	@ Pittsburgh Penguins (1975–76)	0–3–3
7	L	October 19, 1975	1–5	@ Philadelphia Flyers (1975–76)	0–4–3
8	L	October 22, 1975	1–4	Montreal Canadiens (1975–76)	0–5–3
9	L	October 25, 1975	3–5	Buffalo Sabres (1975–76)	0–6–3
10	L	October 26, 1975	3–7	@ Boston Bruins (1975–76)	0–7–3
11	W	October 29, 1975	6–4	California Golden Seals (1975–76)	1–7–3

November

Game	Result	Date	Score	Opponent	Record
12	L	November 1, 1975	1–3	Chicago Black Hawks (1975–76)	1–8–3
13	W	November 2, 1975	6–4	@ New York Rangers (1975–76)	2–8–3
14	L	November 5, 1975	3–7	@ Toronto Maple Leafs (1975–76)	2–9–3
15	L	November 8, 1975	0–5	@ Montreal Canadiens (1975–76)	2–10–3
16	W	November 9, 1975	6–3	Atlanta Flames (1975–76)	3–10–3
17	W	November 13, 1975	6–3	Kansas City Scouts (1975–76)	4–10–3
18	W	November 15, 1975	3–1	Philadelphia Flyers (1975–76)	5–10–3
19	L	November 16, 1975	0–3	@ New York Rangers (1975–76)	5–11–3
20	T	November 19, 1975	3–3	Boston Bruins (1975–76)	5–11–4
21	L	November 20, 1975	2–7	@ Buffalo Sabres (1975–76)	5–12–4
22	L	November 22, 1975	1–5	@ St. Louis Blues (1975–76)	5–13–4
23	W	November 23, 1975	4–1	Los Angeles Kings (1975–76)	6–13–4
24	L	November 26, 1975	2–5	@ Pittsburgh Penguins (1975–76)	6–14–4
25	W	November 29, 1975	5–3	@ Kansas City Scouts (1975–76)	7–14–4

December

Game	Result	Date	Score	Opponent	Record
26	L	December 3, 1975	1–9	@ Vancouver Canucks (1975–76)	7–15–4
27	L	December 5, 1975	2–3	@ California Golden Seals (1975–76)	7–16–4
28	L	December 6, 1975	2–3	@ Los Angeles Kings (1975–76)	7–17–4
29	W	December 10, 1975	3–2	Pittsburgh Penguins (1975–76)	8–17–4
30	W	December 12, 1975	5–3	@ Washington Capitals (1975–76)	9–17–4
31	L	December 13, 1975	2–5	New York Rangers (1975–76)	9–18–4
32	W	December 17, 1975	3–1	Buffalo Sabres (1975–76)	10–18–4
33	L	December 19, 1975	1–4	@ Kansas City Scouts (1975–76)	10–19–4
34	L	December 20, 1975	3–5	@ Minnesota North Stars (1975–76)	10–20–4
35	L	December 28, 1975	2–3	Vancouver Canucks (1975–76)	10–21–4
36	W	December 31, 1975	4–0	Washington Capitals (1975–76)	11–21–4

January

Game	Result	Date	Score	Opponent	Record
37	W	January 3, 1976	1–0	@ Toronto Maple Leafs (1975–76)	12–21–4
38	L	January 4, 1976	3–4	Vancouver Canucks (1975–76)	12–22–4
39	L	January 6, 1976	3–4	@ Atlanta Flames (1975–76)	12–23–4
40	W	January 8, 1976	5–0	Minnesota North Stars (1975–76)	13–23–4
41	L	January 10, 1976	1–7	@ Montreal Canadiens (1975–76)	13–24–4
42	L	January 13, 1976	0–1	@ New York Islanders (1975–76)	13–25–4
43	W	January 14, 1976	8–3	Kansas City Scouts (1975–76)	14–25–4
44	T	January 17, 1976	4–4	Toronto Maple Leafs (1975–76)	14–25–5
45	L	January 18, 1976	3–8	Los Angeles Kings (1975–76)	14–26–5
46	L	January 22, 1976	1–8	@ New York Islanders (1975–76)	14–27–5
47	L	January 24, 1976	1–6	Boston Bruins (1975–76)	14–28–5
48	T	January 25, 1976	3–3	Montreal Canadiens (1975–76)	14–28–6
49	W	January 27, 1976	3–2	@ St. Louis Blues (1975–76)	15–28–6
50	T	January 29, 1976	3–3	@ Los Angeles Kings (1975–76)	15–28–7
51	W	January 31, 1976	2–1	Chicago Black Hawks (1975–76)	16–28–7

February

Game	Result	Date	Score	Opponent	Record
52	W	February 4, 1976	5–0	Minnesota North Stars (1975–76)	17–28–7
53	W	February 6, 1976	4–3	New York Islanders (1975–76)	18–28–7
54	L	February 7, 1976	4–5	New York Rangers (1975–76)	18–29–7
55	L	February 8, 1976	0–7	@ Boston Bruins (1975–76)	18–30–7
56	L	February 11, 1976	2–4	@ Buffalo Sabres (1975–76)	18–31–7
57	W	February 14, 1976	3–2	@ Minnesota North Stars (1975–76)	19–31–7
58	L	February 15, 1976	5–8	@ Washington Capitals (1975–76)	19–32–7
59	L	February 18, 1976	3–5	New York Islanders (1975–76)	19–33–7
60	L	February 21, 1976	1–5	Washington Capitals (1975–76)	19–34–7
61	T	February 22, 1976	2–2	Pittsburgh Penguins (1975–76)	19–34–8
62	L	February 25, 1976	0–8	@ Toronto Maple Leafs (1975–76)	19–35–8
63	T	February 26, 1976	1–1	California Golden Seals (1975–76)	19–35–9
64	L	February 28, 1976	1–3	Los Angeles Kings (1975–76)	19–36–9

March

Game	Result	Date	Score	Opponent	Record
65	W	March 3, 1976	3–2	@ Atlanta Flames (1975–76)	20–36–9
66	L	March 6, 1976	1–6	@ Philadelphia Flyers (1975–76)	20–37–9
67	L	March 7, 1976	1–6	Montreal Canadiens (1975–76)	20–38–9
68	L	March 10, 1976	3–4	@ California Golden Seals (1975–76)	20–39–9
69	W	March 13, 1976	4–1	@ Los Angeles Kings (1975–76)	21–39–9
70	L	March 16, 1976	2–4	@ Vancouver Canucks (1975–76)	21–40–9
71	W	March 18, 1976	6–3	St. Louis Blues (1975–76)	22–40–9
72	W	March 20, 1976	4–2	Philadelphia Flyers (1975–76)	23–40–9
73	W	March 21, 1976	6–0	@ Chicago Black Hawks (1975–76)	24–40–9
74	W	March 24, 1976	7–3	Washington Capitals (1975–76)	25–40–9
75	W	March 27, 1976	8–0	Atlanta Flames (1975–76)	26–40–9
76	L	March 28, 1976	0–3	@ Pittsburgh Penguins (1975–76)	26–41–9
77	L	March 30, 1976	3–5	@ Washington Capitals (1975–76)	26–42–9
78	T	March 31, 1976	4–4	Toronto Maple Leafs (1975–76)	26–42–10

April

Game	Result	Date	Score	Opponent	Record
79	L	April 3, 1976	3–6	@ Montreal Canadiens (1975–76)	26–43–10
80	L	April 4, 1976	5–6	Pittsburgh Penguins (1975–76)	26–44–10

Legend: Win (2 points) Loss (0 points) Tie (1 point)

== Player statistics ==
=== Regular season ===
Scoring

Player	Pos	GP	G	A	Pts	PIM	+/-	PPG	SHG	GWG
Walt McKechnie	C	80	26	56	82	85	9	2	3	7
Dan Maloney	LW	77	27	39	66	203	0	6	2	3
Michel Bergeron	RW	72	32	27	59	48	2	12	0	4
Nick Libett	LW	80	20	26	46	71	-9	3	1	3
Bill Hogaboam	C	50	21	16	37	30	-8	6	2	0
Rick Lapointe	D	80	10	23	33	95	-3	2	0	0
Terry Harper	D	69	8	25	33	59	6	4	0	0
Mike Bloom	LW	76	13	17	30	99	-19	1	0	1
Mickey Redmond	RW	37	11	17	28	10	-17	2	0	3
Dennis Polonich	C/RW	57	11	12	23	302	-9	1	0	0
Danny Grant	RW	39	10	13	23	20	-17	4	1	0
Bill Lochead	LW	53	9	11	20	22	-15	0	0	3
Bryan Watson	D	79	0	18	18	322	-20	0	0	0
Buster Harvey	RW	35	8	9	17	25	-8	1	0	0
Dennis Hextall	LW	17	5	9	14	71	2	0	0	1
J.P. LeBlanc	C	46	4	9	13	39	-5	0	0	0
Barry Salovaara	D	63	2	11	13	52	-7	1	0	1
Jean Hamel	D	77	3	9	12	129	-13	1	0	0
Al Cameron	D	38	2	8	10	49	-7	1	0	0
Mike Korney	RW	27	1	7	8	23	-8	0	0	0
Phil Roberto	RW	37	1	7	8	68	-2	0	0	0
Bryan Hextall Jr.	C	21	0	4	4	29	-4	0	0	0
Larry Giroux	D	10	1	1	2	25	-10	0	0	0
Mike Wong	C	22	1	1	2	12	-11	0	0	0
Frank Bathe	D	7	0	1	1	9	-1	0	0	0
Don Martineau	RW	9	0	1	1	0	-1	0	0	0
Jim Nahrgang	D	3	0	1	1	0	-5	0	0	0
Ed Giacomin	G	29	0	0	0	0	0	0	0	0
Doug Grant	G	2	0	0	0	0	0	0	0	0
Ken Mann	RW	1	0	0	0	0	-1	0	0	0
Brian McCutcheon	LW	8	0	0	0	5	-2	0	0	0
Peter McDuffe	G	4	0	0	0	2	0	0	0	0
Terry Richardson	G	1	0	0	0	2	0	0	0	0
Jim Rutherford	G	44	0	0	0	4	0	0	0	0
Brian Watts	LW	4	0	0	0	0	0	0	0	0

Goaltending

Player	MIN	GP	W	L	T	GA	GAA	SO
Jim Rutherford	2640	44	13	25	6	158	3.59	4
Ed Giacomin	1740	29	12	14	3	100	3.45	2
Doug Grant	120	2	1	1	0	8	4.00	0
Peter McDuffe	240	4	0	3	1	22	5.50	0
Terry Richardson	60	1	0	1	0	7	7.00	0
Team:	4800	80	26	44	10	295	3.69	6

Note: GP = Games played; G = Goals; A = Assists; Pts = Points; +/- = Plus-minus PIM = Penalty minutes; PPG = Power-play goals; SHG = Short-handed goals; GWG = Game-winning goals;
MIN = Minutes played; W = Wins; L = Losses; T = Ties; GA = Goals against; GAA = Goals-against average; SO = Shutouts;

== Draft picks ==
Detroit's draft picks at the 1975 NHL amateur draft held in Montreal.

Round	#	Player	Nationality	College/Junior/Club team (League)
1	5	Rick Lapointe	Canada	Victoria Cougars (WCHL)
2	23	Jerry Rollins	Canada	Winnipeg Clubs (WCHL)
3	37	Al Cameron	Canada	New Westminster Bruins (WCHL)
3	45	Blair Davidson	Canada	Flin Flon Bombers (WCHL)
3	50	Clark Hamilton	Canada	University of Notre Dame (WCHA)
4	59	Mike Wirachowsky	Canada	Regina Pats (WCHL)
5	77	Mike Wong	United States	Montreal Bleu Blanc Rouge (QMJHL)
6	95	Mike Harazny	Canada	Regina Pats (WCHL)
7	113	Jean-Luc Phaneuf	Canada	Montreal Bleu Blanc Rouge (QMJHL)
8	131	Steve Carlson	United States	Johnstown Jets (NAHL)
9	148	Gary Vaughan	Canada	Medicine Hat Tigers (WCHL)
10	164	Jean Thibodeau	Canada	Shawinigan Dynamos (QMJHL)
11	176	Dave Hanson	United States	Colorado College (WCHA)
11	178	Rob Larson	United States	University of Minnesota (WCHA)

== See also ==
- 1975–76 NHL season
