= 1975–76 California Golden Seals season =

NHL season

1975–76 California Golden Seals
- Division: 4th Adams
- Conference: 7th Wales
- 1975–76 record: 27–42–11
- Home record: 16–19–5
- Road record: 11–23–6
- Goals for: 250
- Goals against: 278

Team information
- General manager: Bill McCreary
- Coach: Jack Evans
- Captain: Jim Neilson and Bob Stewart
- Alternate captains: None
- Arena: Oakland Coliseum Arena

Team leaders
- Goals: Al MacAdam (32)
- Assists: Dennis Maruk (32)
- Points: Al McAdam (63)
- Penalty minutes: Mike Christie (152)
- Plus/minus: Frank Spring (+1)
- Wins: Gary Simmons (15)
- Goals against average: Gary Simmons (3.33)

The 1975–76 California Golden Seals season would be the Seals' ninth and final season in the Bay Area of California. The Seals were led by rookie Dennis Maruk.

Maruk centered the 3M line with Bob Murdoch and Al MacAdam. Both Maruk and MacAdam scored over 30 goals while Murdoch led the team in power play goals. Although they recorded a solid improvement over the previous season, the Seals fell 7 points shy of a playoff spot.

Owner Mel Swig was counting on the construction of a new arena in San Francisco, but after the proposal was defeated, he was convinced by minority owner George Gund III to relocate the franchise to Cleveland, where it was renamed Cleveland Barons. The NHL returned to the Bay Area fifteen years later, when the San Jose Sharks entered via expansion.

== Offseason ==
=== Amateur draft ===
Round	Pick	Player	Nationality	College/junior/club team
1	3.	Ralph Klassen	Canada	Saskatoon Blades (WCHL)
2	21.	Dennis Maruk	Canada	London Knights (OMJHL)
3	39.	John Tweedle	Canada	Lake Superior State Lakers (CCHA)
4	57.	Greg Smith	Canada	Colorado College Tigers (WCHA)
5	75.	Doug Young	Canada	Michigan Tech Huskies (WCHA)
6	93.	Larry Hendrick	Canada	Calgary Centennials (WCHL)
7	111.	Rick Shinske	Canada	New Westminster Bruins (WCHL)
8	129.	Doug Schoenfeld	Canada	Cambridge Hornets (OHA Sr. A)
9	146.	Jim Weaver	Canada	Kingston Canadians (OMJHL)
10	162.	Greg Agar	Canada	Merritt Centennials (BCJHL)

== Regular season ==
=== Final standings ===
Adams Division
	GP	W	L	T	GF	GA	Pts
**Boston Bruins**	80	48	15	17	313	237	113
**Buffalo Sabres**	80	46	21	13	339	240	105
**Toronto Maple Leafs**	80	34	31	15	294	276	83
California Golden Seals	80	27	42	11	250	278	65

Note: GP = Games played, W = Wins, L = Losses, T = Ties, Pts = Points, GF = Goals for, GA = Goals against
Note: Teams that qualified for the playoffs are highlighted in bold.

=== Record vs. opponents ===
Adams Division record vs. opponents

**Vs. Wales Conference**

**Vs. Campbell Conference**

**Vs. Adams Division**

1975–76 NHL records
Team	**BOS**	**BUF**	**CAL**	**TOR**	**Total**
Boston	—	3–2–1	5–1	4–1–1	**12–4–2**
Buffalo	2–3–1	—	5–0–1	4–2	**11–5–2**
California	1–5	0–5–1	—	1–3–2	**2–13–3**
Toronto	1–4–1	2–4	3–1–2	—	**6–9–3**

**Vs. Norris Division**

1975–76 NHL records
Team	**DET**	**LAK**	**MTL**	**PIT**	**WSH**	**Total**
Boston	3–0–2	4–1	0–3–2	3–0–2	4–0–1	**14–4–7**
Buffalo	4–1	3–2	2–3	4–1	4–0–1	**17–7–1**
California	3–1–1	2–3	0–5	2–2–1	3–1–1	**10–12–3**
Toronto	2–1–2	3–1–1	1–3–1	1–4	4–0–1	**11–9–5**

**Vs. Patrick Division**

1975–76 NHL records
Team	**ATL**	**NYI**	**NYR**	**PHI**	**Total**
Boston	3–2	2–0–2	3–1	2–1–1	**10–4–3**
Buffalo	2–1–1	2–2	2–0–3	0–3–1	**6–6–5**
California	1–3	1–3	3–1	0–4–1	**5–11–1**
Toronto	2–2	1–3–1	4–0	0–3–1	**7–8–2**

**Vs. Smythe Division**

1975–76 NHL records
Team	**CHI**	**KCS**	**MIN**	**STL**	**VAN**	**Total**
Boston	3–0–1	2–1–1	3–0–1	2–1–1	2–1–1	**12–3–5**
Buffalo	2–0–2	3–0–1	4–0	2–1–1	1–2–1	**12–3–5**
California	2–1–1	1–2–1	3–1	2–1–1	2–1–1	**10–6–4**
Toronto	1–2–1	3–0–1	3–1	2–0–2	1–2–1	**10–5–5**

== Schedule and results ==
1975–76 regular season
October

Game	Result	Date	Score	Opponent	Record
1	W	October 8, 1975	4–3	@ Atlanta Flames (1975–76)	1–0–0
2	W	October 11, 1975	5–2	@ Detroit Red Wings (1975–76)	2–0–0
3	L	October 12, 1975	1–4	@ Philadelphia Flyers (1975–76)	2–1–0
4	L	October 15, 1975	1–4	@ Minnesota North Stars (1975–76)	2–2–0
5	T	October 17, 1975	3–3	Washington Capitals (1975–76)	2–2–1
6	L	October 18, 1975	3–5	@ Los Angeles Kings (1975–76)	2–3–1
7	W	October 22, 1975	4–2	Minnesota North Stars (1975–76)	3–3–1
8	T	October 25, 1975	2–2	@ Toronto Maple Leafs (1975–76)	3–3–2
9	L	October 26, 1975	2–3	@ Buffalo Sabres (1975–76)	3–4–2
10	L	October 29, 1975	4–6	@ Detroit Red Wings (1975–76)	3–5–2
11	L	October 31, 1975	0–2	Atlanta Flames (1975–76)	3–6–2

November

Game	Result	Date	Score	Opponent	Record
12	L	November 2, 1975	0–5	@ Boston Bruins (1975–76)	3–7–2
13	L	November 4, 1975	3–5	@ New York Islanders (1975–76)	3–8–2
14	L	November 5, 1975	2–3	@ Kansas City Scouts (1975–76)	3–9–2
15	W	November 7, 1975	7–5	New York Rangers (1975–76)	4–9–2
16	L	November 9, 1975	3–6	Boston Bruins (1975–76)	4–10–2
17	W	November 11, 1975	3–2	@ Los Angeles Kings (1975–76)	5–10–2
18	W	November 12, 1975	5–1	New York Islanders (1975–76)	6–10–2
19	L	November 14, 1975	2–4	Toronto Maple Leafs (1975–76)	6–11–2
20	L	November 16, 1975	1–4	@ Buffalo Sabres (1975–76)	6–12–2
21	W	November 18, 1975	5–3	@ Pittsburgh Penguins (1975–76)	7–12–2
22	L	November 20, 1975	2–3	@ Philadelphia Flyers (1975–76)	7–13–2
23	W	November 21, 1975	2–0	@ Washington Capitals (1975–76)	8–13–2
24	L	November 23, 1975	2–3	@ New York Rangers (1975–76)	8–14–2
25	W	November 26, 1975	2–1	Vancouver Canucks (1975–76)	9–14–2
26	L	November 28, 1975	2–4	Buffalo Sabres (1975–76)	9–15–2
27	L	November 30, 1975	1–4	Atlanta Flames (1975–76)	9–16–2

December

Game	Result	Date	Score	Opponent	Record
28	L	December 3, 1975	2–3	Los Angeles Kings (1975–76)	9–17–2
29	W	December 5, 1975	3–2	Detroit Red Wings (1975–76)	10–17–2
30	T	December 10, 1975	1–1	Philadelphia Flyers (1975–76)	10–17–3
31	W	December 12, 1975	5–2	St. Louis Blues (1975–76)	11–17–3
32	L	December 17, 1975	2–9	Pittsburgh Penguins (1975–76)	11–18–3
33	W	December 19, 1975	5–2	Chicago Black Hawks (1975–76)	12–18–3
34	L	December 21, 1975	1–2	Montreal Canadiens (1975–76)	12–19–3
35	L	December 26, 1975	2–4	Los Angeles Kings (1975–76)	12–20–3
36	L	December 28, 1975	1–3	Kansas City Scouts (1975–76)	12–21–3
37	L	December 30, 1975	3–5	@ Chicago Black Hawks (1975–76)	12–22–3

January

Game	Result	Date	Score	Opponent	Record
38	L	January 1, 1976	1–5	@ Toronto Maple Leafs (1975–76)	12–23–3
39	W	January 2, 1976	8–5	@ Washington Capitals (1975–76)	13–23–3
40	W	January 7, 1976	4–1	Pittsburgh Penguins (1975–76)	14–23–3
41	W	January 9, 1976	5–0	@ Washington Capitals (1975–76)	15–23–3
42	L	January 10, 1976	2–3	@ Boston Bruins (1975–76)	15–24–3
43	T	January 14, 1976	2–2	Chicago Black Hawks (1975–76)	15–24–4
44	W	January 16, 1976	7–0	New York Rangers (1975–76)	16–24–4
45	W	January 17, 1976	5–3	@ Vancouver Canucks (1975–76)	17–24–4
46	W	January 23, 1976	4–1	Kansas City Scouts (1975–76)	18–24–4
47	W	January 25, 1976	5–3	Toronto Maple Leafs (1975–76)	19–24–4
48	L	January 28, 1976	2–4	Washington Capitals (1975–76)	19–25–4
49	L	January 30, 1976	4–5	Montreal Canadiens (1975–76)	19–26–4

February

Game	Result	Date	Score	Opponent	Record
50	L	February 1, 1976	5–9	Buffalo Sabres (1975–76)	19–27–4
51	T	February 3, 1976	4–4	@ St. Louis Blues (1975–76)	19–27–5
52	L	February 4, 1976	1–4	@ Atlanta Flames (1975–76)	19–28–5
53	L	February 6, 1976	1–7	@ Montreal Canadiens (1975–76)	19–29–5
54	T	February 8, 1976	5–5	@ Buffalo Sabres (1975–76)	19–29–6
55	T	February 11, 1976	4–4	Pittsburgh Penguins (1975–76)	19–29–7
56	L	February 13, 1976	5–6	Boston Bruins (1975–76)	19–30–7
57	W	February 15, 1976	7–3	@ Minnesota North Stars (1975–76)	20–30–7
58	L	February 16, 1976	2–4	@ St. Louis Blues (1975–76)	20–31–7
59	W	February 18, 1976	6–3	Minnesota North Stars (1975–76)	21–31–7
60	L	February 20, 1976	4–5	Philadelphia Flyers (1975–76)	21–32–7
61	W	February 22, 1976	5–2	@ Chicago Black Hawks (1975–76)	22–32–7
62	W	February 25, 1976	6–4	@ New York Rangers (1975–76)	23–32–7
63	T	February 26, 1976	1–1	@ Detroit Red Wings (1975–76)	23–32–8
64	L	February 28, 1976	2–4	@ Toronto Maple Leafs (1975–76)	23–33–8
65	L	February 29, 1976	1–6	@ Philadelphia Flyers (1975–76)	23–34–8

March

Game	Result	Date	Score	Opponent	Record
66	L	March 2, 1976	1–2	@ New York Islanders (1975–76)	23–35–8
67	L	March 3, 1976	2–4	@ Montreal Canadiens (1975–76)	23–36–8
68	W	March 5, 1976	4–3	Boston Bruins (1975–76)	24–36–8
69	T	March 7, 1976	7–7	Toronto Maple Leafs (1975–76)	24–36–9
70	W	March 10, 1976	4–3	Detroit Red Wings (1975–76)	25–36–9
71	L	March 13, 1976	2–4	@ Pittsburgh Penguins (1975–76)	25–37–9
72	L	March 14, 1976	2–4	@ Boston Bruins (1975–76)	25–38–9
73	L	March 17, 1976	3–5	Buffalo Sabres (1975–76)	25–39–9
74	L	March 19, 1976	1–4	Montreal Canadiens (1975–76)	25–40–9
75	T	March 20, 1976	2–2	@ Kansas City Scouts (1975–76)	25–40–10
76	W	March 22, 1976	7–1	St. Louis Blues (1975–76)	26–40–10
77	L	March 26, 1976	2–3	New York Islanders (1975–76)	26–41–10
78	T	March 30, 1976	4–4	@ Vancouver Canucks (1975–76)	26–41–11

April

Game	Result	Date	Score	Opponent	Record
79	L	April 2, 1976	0–5	Vancouver Canucks (1975–76)	26–42–11
80	W	April 4, 1976	5–2	Los Angeles Kings (1975–76)	27–42–11

Legend: Win (2 points) Loss (0 points) Tie (1 point)

== Player statistics ==
=== Skaters ===
Note: GP = Games played; G = Goals; A = Assists; Pts = Points; PIM = Penalties in minutes

		Regular season					Playoffs
Player	#	GP	G	A	Pts	PIM	GP	G	A	Pts	PIM
Al MacAdam	25	80	32	31	63	49	–	–	–	–	–
Dennis Maruk	21	80	30	32	62	44	–	–	–	–	–
Wayne Merrick^{†}	9	56	25	27	52	36	–	–	–	–	–
Rick Hampton	2	73	14	37	51	54	–	–	–	–	–
Bob Murdoch	20	78	22	27	49	53	–	–	–	–	–
Gary Sabourin	11	76	21	28	49	33	–	–	–	–	–
Dave Gardner	7	74	16	31	47	8	–	–	–	–	–
Bob Girard	26	80	16	26	42	54	–	–	–	–	–
Jim Moxey	19	44	10	16	26	33	–	–	–	–	–
Fred Ahern	16	44	17	8	25	43	–	–	–	–	–
Ralph Klassen	10	71	6	15	21	26	–	–	–	–	–
Bob Stewart	4	76	4	17	21	112	–	–	–	–	–
Mike Christie	3	78	3	18	21	152	–	–	–	–	–
Jim Pappin	14	32	6	13	19	12	–	–	–	–	–
Len Frig	6	62	3	12	15	55	–	–	–	–	–
Dave Hrechkosy^{‡}	18	38	9	5	14	14	–	–	–	–	–
George Pesut	5	45	3	9	12	57	–	–	–	–	–
Wayne King	24	46	1	11	12	26	–	–	–	–	–
Gary Holt	8	48	6	5	11	50	–	–	–	–	–
Tim Jacobs	23	46	0	10	10	35	–	–	–	–	–
Larry Patey^{‡}	9	18	4	4	8	23	–	–	–	–	–
Jim Neilson	15	26	1	6	7	20	–	–	–	–	–
Butch Williams	12	14	0	4	4	7	–	–	–	–	–
Charlie Simmer	17	21	1	1	2	22	–	–	–	–	–
Frank Spring	14	1	0	2	2	0	–	–	–	–	–
Greg Smith	5	1	0	1	1	2	–	–	–	–	–
Gilles Meloche	27	41	0	1	1	0	–	–	–	–	–
Brent Meeke	25	1	0	0	0	0	–	–	–	–	–
Tom Price	17	5	0	0	0	0	–	–	–	–	–
Gary Simmons	31	40	0	0	0	18	–	–	–	–	–

^{†}Denotes player spent time with another team before joining Seals. Stats reflect time with the Seals only. ^{‡}Traded mid-season

=== Goaltenders ===
Note: GP = Games played; TOI = Time on ice (minutes); W = Wins; L = Losses; T = Ties; GA = Goals against; SO = Shutouts; GAA = Goals against average

		Regular season								Playoffs
Player	#	GP	TOI	W	L	T	GA	SO	GAA	GP	TOI	W	L	GA	SO	GAA
Gary Simmons	31	40	2360	15	19	5	131	2	3.33	–	–	–	–	–	–	-.--
Gilles Meloche	27	41	2440	12	23	6	140	1	3.44	–	–	–	–	–	–	-.--

== Transactions ==
The Seals were involved in the following transactions during the 1975–76 season:

=== Trades ===
June, 1975	To California Golden Seals Gary Holt	To Phoenix Roadrunners (WHA) rights to Del Hall rights to Ron Huston
June 1, 1975	To California Golden Seals Jim Pappin; 3rd-round pick in 1977 Draft (Guy Lash)	To Chicago Black Hawks Joey Johnston
June 20, 1975	To California Golden Seals Gary Sabourin	To Toronto Maple Leafs Stan Weir
October 22, 1975	To California Golden Seals cash	To St. Louis Blues rights to Rick Smith
November 14, 1975	To California Golden Seals Wayne Merrick	To St. Louis Blues Larry Patey; 3rd-round pick in 1977 Draft (reacquired later—Reg Kerr)
March 9, 1976	To California Golden Seals 5th-round pick in 1976 Draft (Cal Sandbeck); Seals' 3rd-round pick in 1977 Draft (Reg Kerr)	To St. Louis Blues Dave Hrechkosy

=== Additions and subtractions ===
Additions
Player	Former team	Via
—	—	—

Subtractions
Player	New team	Via
Brian Lavender	Denver Spurs (WHA)	free agency
Ted McAneeley	Edmonton Oilers (WHA)	free agency
Morris Mott	Frölunda HC (Elitserien)	free agency
John Stewart	Cleveland Crusaders (WHA)	free agency
Larry Wright	Philadelphia Flyers	free agency (1975-09-10)
Terry Murray	Philadelphia Flyers	free agency (1975-09-17)
