= Wayne Thomas (ice hockey) =

Canadian ice hockey player (1947–2025)

- Born: October 9, 1947 Ottawa, Ontario, Canada
- Died: July 16, 2025 (aged 77) Falmouth, Massachusetts, U.S.
- Height: 6 ft 1 in (185 cm)
- Weight: 205 lb (93 kg; 14 st 9 lb)
- Position: Goaltender
- Caught: Left
- Played for: Montreal Canadiens; Toronto Maple Leafs; New York Rangers
- Playing career: 1972–1981

Robert Wayne Thomas (October 9, 1947 – July 16, 2025) was a Canadian professional ice hockey goaltender who played in the National Hockey League (NHL) for the Montreal Canadiens, Toronto Maple Leafs, and New York Rangers between 1972 and 1981. He also held several positions in coaching and management in the NHL and the minor leagues, including 22 years in management with the San Jose Sharks.

== Playing career ==
Born in Ottawa, Ontario, on October 9, 1947, Thomas played junior hockey from 1963 to 1967 with the Ottawa Capitals of the Central Canada Hockey League (CCHL), and was the league's top goaltender in 1965–66. Thomas then attended University of Wisconsin, where played varsity hockey with the Wisconsin Badgers under coach Bob Johnson. In his first game with Wisconsin, Thomas recorded a shutout victory against Pennsylvania. He was second-team All-WCHA for the 1969–70 season and was with the team in its first appearance in the Frozen Four tournament in Lake Placid, New York, in 1970. That same season he was named the team's MVP. Thomas ranks in the top 10 all-time for Wisconsin goaltenders in save percentage (.909 – 9th all-time) and goals against average (2.84 – 10th all-time) as of the 2022–23 season.

Thomas joined the Montreal Canadiens in 1970 in a trade with the Los Angeles Kings, who had acquired his original National Hockey League rights from the Toronto Maple Leafs back in 1968. Thomas played two seasons with the Montreal and Nova Scotia Voyageurs, the American Hockey League (AHL) affiliate of the Montreal Canadiens. With the Voyageurs, he won the Calder Cup in 1972.

The following season, 1972–73, Thomas joined the Canadiens in Montreal and became the tenth goalie to record a shutout in his NHL debut, a 3–0 victory against the Vancouver Canucks. He recorded a victory in his first seven home starts, and despite an overall 8–1 regular season record, he did not make an appearance in the team's Stanley Cup playoff run; Thomas was the number 3 goalie behind Ken Dryden and Michel Plasse. In 1973–74, with Dryden sitting out the season to complete his bar exam, he shared duties with Plasse and Michel Larocque, playing 42 games and sporting a 2.76 goals against average, but again was not used in the playoffs. On March 10, 1974, Thomas made 53 saves in a 5–4 victory against the Pittsburgh Penguins, setting a Canadiens record that has since been tied by Carey Price. Thomas held the NHL's fourth-best goals against average and was Montreal's winner of that year's Molson Cup. He then spent the entire 1974–75 season as Montreal's number 3 goalie, but did not see action in a single game as Dryden returned with Larocque as his backup. Thomas was frustrated, but appeased when Montreal general manager Sam Pollock advised him that the team intended to not utilize him but would trade him to a "good situation" in the off season.

After three seasons in Montreal, he was acquired by the Toronto Maple Leafs in June 1975 in exchange for a first-round draft pick. He played in the 1976 All Star game and recorded the win. After two years in Toronto, he became expendable upon the emergence of Mike Palmateer, and the New York Rangers acquired him in the 1977 NHL Waiver Draft, to use him as the backup to John Davidson. When Davidson got injured, Thomas took over as the starter, playing in 41 games that season. Thomas played four seasons with the Rangers and retired in 1981. He finished his eight-year NHL career with a 103–93–34 record, 3.34 GAA and .891 SV% while recording 10 shutouts.

== Coaching and management career ==
After retiring as a player, he was hired by the New York Rangers and became one of the first goaltending coaches in professional hockey. By January 1981, Thomas was third on the Rangers' goalie depth chart behind John Davidson and Doug Soetaert, and was seen by coach and general manager Craig Patrick to be more useful to the team as a coach; Thomas was announced to be coaching the team's goalies on January 28. He remained in that post till the end of the 1984–85 season, after which he became the head coach of the Salt Lake Golden Eagles, the Rangers' affiliate in the International Hockey League (IHL). A season later, the Golden Eagles won the Turner Cup and Thomas was awarded the Commissioner's Trophy as the Coach of the Year in the IHL.

In 1986, he returned to the NHL as assistant coach of the Chicago Blackhawks, a hiring based in part on his work with goalies such as Mike Vernon with the Golden Eagles, and Glen Hanlon and John Vanbiesbrouck with the Rangers. Under head coach Bob Murdoch, Thomas focused on Chicago's goalies and was involved in the development of Jimmy Waite and Ed Belfour. During the 1989–90 season, Thomas served as head coach of the St. Louis Blues' IHL affiliate, the Peoria Rivermen. In January 1990, the Blues temporarily brought him to St. Louis as a de facto goaltender coach to consult on the development of Blues prospects Vincent Riendeau and Curtis Joseph. That summer Thomas was officially named a Blues assistant coach, with specialty in goaltending, and was specifically hired by head coach Brian Sutter for his experience. Thomas stayed on as an assistant coach in 1992 when St. Louis replaced Sutter with Bob Plager.

In 1993, Thomas left the Blues to become an assistant coach as well as an assistant to the general manager with the San Jose Sharks. He remained in that role until the 1995–96 season, when he was named assistant general manager. He was named vice president of the Sharks in 2001. He remained vice president and assistant general manager until his retirement in 2015.

== Personal life and death ==
Thomas had a bachelor's degree in physical education from the University of Wisconsin. He and his wife, Barb, had two daughters.

Thomas died of cancer in Falmouth, Massachusetts, on July 16, 2025, at the age of 77.

== Career statistics ==
=== Regular season and playoffs ===
			Regular season									Playoffs
Season	Team	League	GP	W	L	T	MIN	GA	SO	GAA	SV%	GP	W	L	MIN	GA	SO	GAA	SV%
1966–67	Morrisburg Combines	Al-Cup	—	—	—	—	—	—	—	—	—	3	0	2	127	13	0	6.14	—
1968–69	University of Wisconsin	WCHA	16	9	6	1	943	44	2	2.80	.901	—	—	—	—	—	—	—	—
1969–70	University of Wisconsin	WCHA	21	14	7	0	1250	60	1	2.88	—	4	3	1	240	10	0	2.50	—
1970–71	Montreal Voyageurs	AHL	33	8	17	6	1845	111	1	3.57	—	3	0	3	179	12	0	4.02	—
1971–72	Nova Scotia Voyageurs	AHL	41	22	8	10	2393	100	1	2.51	—	—	—	—	—	—	—	—	—
1972–73	Montreal Canadiens	NHL	10	8	1	0	583	23	1	2.37	.911	—	—	—	—	—	—	—	—
1972–73	Nova Scotia Voyageurs	AHL	6	—	—	—	300	8	1	1.60	—	—	—	—	—	—	—	—	—
1973–74	Montreal Canadiens	NHL	42	23	12	5	2410	111	1	2.76	.905	—	—	—	—	—	—	—	—
1975–76	Toronto Maple Leafs	NHL	64	28	24	12	3684	196	2	3.19	.900	10	5	5	587	34	1	3.48	.906
1976–77	Toronto Maple Leafs	NHL	33	10	13	6	1799	116	1	3.87	.890	4	1	2	201	12	0	3.58	.886
1977–78	New York Rangers	NHL	41	12	20	7	2349	141	4	3.60	.883	1	0	1	60	4	0	4.00	.852
1978–79	New York Rangers	NHL	31	15	10	3	1666	101	1	3.64	.866	—	—	—	—	—	—	—	—
1979–80	New York Rangers	NHL	12	4	7	0	664	44	0	3.98	.873	—	—	—	—	—	—	—	—
1979–80	New Haven Nighthawks	AHL	5	5	0	0	280	11	0	2.36	.927	—	—	—	—	—	—	—	—
1980–81	New York Rangers	NHL	10	3	6	1	597	34	0	3.42	.868	—	—	—	—	—	—	—	—
NHL totals			243	103	93	34	13,743	766	10	3.34	.891	15	6	8	848	50	1	3.54	.898

== Awards and honours ==
Award	Year
All-WCHA Second Team	1969–70
