= Jean Lemieux =

Canadian ice hockey player

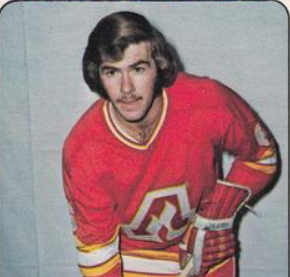
- Lemieux in 1975 card
- Born: May 31, 1952 (age 73) Noranda, Quebec, Canada
- Height: 6 ft 1 in (185 cm)
- Weight: 180 lb (82 kg; 12 st 12 lb)
- Position: Defence
- Shot: Right
- Played for: Atlanta Flames; Washington Capitals
- NHL draft: 34th overall, 1972; Atlanta Flames
- Playing career: 1972–1979

Jean Louis Lemieux (born May 31, 1952) is a Canadian former professional ice hockey defenceman.

Selected by the Atlanta Flames in the 1972 NHL Draft, Lemieux played parts of two and a half seasons with the Flames before he was traded to the Washington Capitals in the deal that sent Bill Clement to Atlanta. Lemieux played for the Capitals through the 1977–78 season.

== Career statistics ==
=== Regular season and playoffs ===
			Regular season					Playoffs
Season	Team	League	GP	G	A	Pts	PIM	GP	G	A	Pts	PIM
1968–69	Noranda Copper Kings	QNWJHL	—	—	—	—	—	—	—	—	—	—
1969–70	Sherbrooke Castors	QMJHL	53	7	23	30	32	—	—	—	—	—
1970–71	Sherbrooke Castors	QMJHL	62	18	37	55	52	11	2	5	7	4
1971–72	Sherbrooke Castors	QMJHL	61	20	50	70	27	4	1	4	5	15
1972–73	Omaha Knights	CHL	64	10	32	42	35	11	4	5	9	0
1973–74	Atlanta Flames	NHL	32	3	5	8	6	3	1	1	2	0
1973–74	Nova Scotia Voyageurs	AHL	24	3	7	10	6	—	—	—	—	—
1974–75	Atlanta Flames	NHL	75	3	24	27	19	—	—	—	—	—
1975–76	Atlanta Flames	NHL	33	4	9	13	10	—	—	—	—	—
1975–76	Nova Scotia Voyageurs	AHL	11	1	9	10	2	—	—	—	—	—
1975–76	Washington Capitals	NHL	33	6	14	20	2	—	—	—	—	—
1976–77	Washington Capitals	NHL	15	4	4	8	2	—	—	—	—	—
1976–77	Springfield Indians	AHL	65	17	28	45	11	—	—	—	—	—
1977–78	Washington Capitals	NHL	16	3	7	10	0	—	—	—	—	—
1977–78	Hershey Bears	AHL	55	7	25	32	12	—	—	—	—	—
1978–79	Nova Scotia Voyageurs	AHL	63	6	37	43	14	10	1	8	9	2
AHL totals			218	34	106	140	45	10	1	8	9	2
NHL totals			204	23	63	86	39	3	1	1	2	0
