= Stan Gilbertson =

American ice hockey player (born 1944)

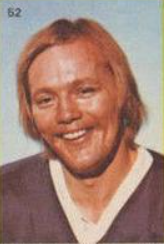
- Born: October 29, 1944 (age 81) Duluth, Minnesota, U.S.
- Height: 6 ft 0 in (183 cm)
- Weight: 175 lb (79 kg; 12 st 7 lb)
- Position: Left wing
- Shot: Left
- Played for: Pittsburgh Penguins; Washington Capitals; St. Louis Blues; California Golden Seals
- Playing career: 1964–1977

Stanley Frank Gilbertson (born October 29, 1944) is a retired American ice hockey player. He played 428 games in the National Hockey League for the California Golden Seals, St. Louis Blues, Washington Capitals, and Pittsburgh Penguins between 1971 and 1977. He lost the lower part of his leg in a 1977 car accident right before training camp and had to retire from hockey. Gilbertson is the last player to score an NHL goal on Christmas Day, as the league has not scheduled a Christmas game since Gilbertson scored on December 25, 1971.

== Career statistics ==
=== Regular season and playoffs ===
			Regular season					Playoffs
Season	Team	League	GP	G	A	Pts	PIM	GP	G	A	Pts	PIM
1963–64	Regina Pats	SJHL	58	40	36	76	122	—	—	—	—	—
1964–65	Minneapolis Bruins	CHL	4	0	1	1	0	—	—	—	—	—
1964–65	Regina Pats	SJHL	53	41	42	83	148	—	—	—	—	—
1965–66	San Francisco Seals	WHL	43	1	8	9	32	7	1	1	2	6
1965–66	Clinton Comets	EHL	34	7	12	19	64	—	—	—	—	—
1966–67	California Seals	WHL	59	6	11	17	25	6	3	1	4	0
1967–68	Vancouver Canucks	WHL	69	18	24	42	35	—	—	—	—	—
1968–69	Hershey Bears	AHL	72	27	19	46	28	11	7	6	13	6
1969–70	Hershey Bears	AHL	64	24	20	44	18	7	3	1	4	6
1970–71	Hershey Bears	AHL	68	31	18	49	50	4	2	0	2	0
1971–72	California Golden Seals	NHL	78	16	16	32	47	—	—	—	—	—
1972–73	California Golden Seals	NHL	66	6	15	21	19	—	—	—	—	—
1973–74	California Golden Seals	NHL	76	18	12	30	39	—	—	—	—	—
1974–75	St. Louis Blues	NHL	22	1	4	5	4	—	—	—	—	—
1974–75	Washington Capitals	NHL	25	11	7	18	12	—	—	—	—	—
1974–75	Denver Spurs	CHL	10	11	4	15	7	—	—	—	—	—
1974–75	California Seals	NHL	15	1	4	5	2	—	—	—	—	—
1975–76	Washington Capitals	NHL	31	13	14	27	6	—	—	—	—	—
1975–76	Pittsburgh Penguins	NHL	48	13	8	21	6	3	1	1	2	2
1976–77	Pittsburgh Penguins	NHL	67	6	9	15	13	—	—	—	—	—
NHL totals			428	85	89	174	148	3	1	1	2	2
