= 1975–76 Los Angeles Kings season =

National Hockey League team season

1975–76 Los Angeles Kings
- Division: 2nd Norris
- Conference: 4th Wales
- 1975–76 record: 38–33–9
- Home record: 22–13–5
- Road record: 16–20–4
- Goals for: 263
- Goals against: 265

Team information
- General manager: Jake Milford
- Coach: Bob Pulford
- Captain: Mike Murphy
- Alternate captains: None
- Arena: Los Angeles Forum

Team leaders
- Goals: Marcel Dionne (40)
- Assists: Marcel Dionne (54)
- Points: Marcel Dionne (94)
- Penalty minutes: Dave Hutchison (181)
- Wins: Rogie Vachon (26)
- Goals against average: Rogie Vachon (3.14)

The 1975–76 Los Angeles Kings season was the Kings' ninth season in the National Hockey League (NHL).

== Offseason ==
The Kings were coming off their most successful season ever, built largely on the strength of their defense and goaltending. They ranked second in fewest goals allowed in the 1974–75 season, but tied for ninth in goals scored. In addition, while their penalty killing was excellent, their power play ranked in the lower third of the league.

Their early round playoff upset by Toronto (where the Kings scored only six goals in three games) prompted them to make one of the biggest trades in club history. High scoring Marcel Dionne was in a contract dispute with the Detroit Red Wings and was available to a team that would meet his salary demands. So to bolster the offense, the Kings traded veteran defenseman and team captain Terry Harper and tough guy forward Dan Maloney along with draft picks to the Detroit Red Wings for future hall of famer Dionne and defenseman Bart Crashley. They then gave Dionne one of the richest contracts in NHL history up to that point at $300,000 per year.

== Regular season ==
Unlike the prior season when the Kings started fast, after the first two games in 1975–76, they were 0–2–0 and had been outscored 16–0. It was later revealed that goaltender Rogie Vachon was playing with a flu-like virus related to typhus. Vachon recovered and the Kings won 10 of their next 12 games to right the ship. However, they played .500 hockey the rest of the way and finished 27 points behind the Montreal Canadiens in the Norris Division. While Dionne delivered a club record 40 goals and 94 points, the team missed Harper's leadership and defense, and Maloney's tough guy presence. A number of players missed significant time with injuries, and the club actually scored six fewer goals that the year before despite the addition of Dionne. The Kings ended up with a record of 38–33–9, second in the Norris Division and sixth overall in the league.

== Post Season ==
The Kings mini series opponent was the Atlanta Flames. The Kings scored in the 1st minute of game one and went on to win 2–1 behind Vachon's brilliant goaltending. In game two, Atlanta tried to physically overwhelm the Kings but Vachon was even better than in game one; Bob Berry's third-period goal won the game 1–0 and the series; it was the Kings first playoff series win since 1969.

=== Boston Series ===
What followed the Atlanta series was one of the most memorable playoff series in Kings history. The Kings were big underdogs against the big, powerful, tradition rich Boston Bruins. Game one went according to form as the Bruins used their size advantage on the smaller rink at the Boston Garden and smothered the Kings, 4–0. Boston continued to dominate play in game two, but Rogie Vachon was brilliant and kept the Kings tied at two going into overtime. Butch Goring then stunned the Boston crowd with an overtime winner, and the teams flew to L.A. tied at a game apiece. One the larger ice surface at the Forum, the Kings' offense got going and, led by Marcel Dionne's hat trick, won game three by a score of 6–4. Suddenly the Kings led a series in which many thought they would get swept. Boston appeared to wake up and won games four and five, outscoring the Kings 10–1, and again seemed in control of the series. When the Kings skated onto the ice in game six back in L.A., the sellout crowd greeted them with a five-minute standing ovation that delayed the national anthem and the start of the game. Players on both sides said they had never seen anything like it. The game that followed was even more amazing. After a scoreless first period in which Vachon made numerous outstanding saves, the Kings' Tom Williams beat Gerry Cheevers over the glove hand on a wicked 55 foot slap shot to send the crowd into a frenzy. Boston came right back to tie the game, and then Vachon stopped Terry O'Reilly on a breakaway to keep the score 1–1. As the game wore on, the Bruins appeared to wear down the Kings and they took a 3–1 lead into the final five minutes. Mike Corrigan scored to make it 3–2, and with the crowd going crazy, Corrigan had another chance as he went for a rebound. Cheevers tripped him, but Corrigan swiped at the puck while lying on his stomach and put it in the net to tie the game. After Vachon made numerous great saves, the first overtime was winding down to its final minute when Butch Goring took a pass in the top of the slot and beat Cheevers, sending the crowd into a frenzy and the series back to Boston for the seventh game. Goring's game winner prompted Kings' hall of fame announcer Bob Miller's famous call "We're going back to Boston! We're going back to Boston! We're going back to Boston!" Goring was carried off the ice on his teammates' shoulders while the crowd continued to go crazy. In the seventh game, after a scoreless first period, Boston eventually wore down the Kings and won 3–0.

=== Final standings ===
Norris Division
	GP	W	L	T	GF	GA	Pts
**Montreal Canadiens**	80	58	11	11	337	174	127
**Los Angeles Kings**	80	38	33	9	263	265	85
**Pittsburgh Penguins**	80	35	33	12	339	303	82
Detroit Red Wings	80	26	44	10	226	300	62
Washington Capitals	80	11	59	10	224	394	32

Note: GP = Games played, W = Wins, L = Losses, T = Ties, Pts = Points, GF = Goals for, GA = Goals against

Note: Teams that qualified for the playoffs are highlighted in bold.

=== Record vs. opponents ===
Norris Division record vs. opponents

**Vs. Wales Conference**

**Vs. Campbell Conference**

**Vs. Norris Division**

1975–76 NHL records
Team	**DET**	**LAK**	**MTL**	**PIT**	**WSH**	**Total**
Detroit	—	2–3–1	0–5–1	1–4–1	3–3	**6–15–3**
Los Angeles	3–2–1	—	2–3–1	1–5	4–1–1	**10–11–3**
Montreal	5–0–1	3–2–1	—	6–0	6–0	**20–2–2**
Pittsburgh	4–1–1	5–1	0–6	—	4–1–1	**13–9–2**
Washington	3–3	1–4–1	0–6	1–4–1	—	**5–17–2**

**Vs. Adams Division**

1975–76 NHL records
Team	**BOS**	**BUF**	**CAL**	**TOR**	**Total**
Detroit	0–3–2	1–4	1–3–1	1–2–2	**3–12–5**
Los Angeles	1–4	2–3	3–2	1–3–1	**7–12–1**
Montreal	3–0–2	3–2	5–0	3–1–1	**14–3–3**
Pittsburgh	0–3–2	1–4	2–2–1	4–1	**7–10–3**
Washington	0–4–1	0–4–1	1–3–1	0–4–1	**1–15–4**

**Vs. Patrick Division**

1975–76 NHL records
Team	**ATL**	**NYI**	**NYR**	**PHI**	**Total**
Detroit	3–1	1–3	1–3	2–2	**7–9**
Los Angeles	3–1	1–2–1	4–0	0–2–2	**8–5–3**
Montreal	4–0	2–1–1	3–0–1	1–2–1	**10–3–3**
Pittsburgh	2–1–1	1–2–1	3–1	0–3–1	**6–7–3**
Washington	0–4	0–4	2–2	0–3–1	**2–13–1**

**Vs. Smythe Division**

1975–76 NHL records
Team	**CHI**	**KCS**	**MIN**	**STL**	**VAN**	**Total**
Detroit	2–1–1	3–1	3–1	2–1–1	0–4	**10–8–2**
Los Angeles	2–2	4–0	2–1–1	2–1–1	3–1	**13–5–2**
Montreal	2–1–1	3–1	4–0	4–0	1–1–2	**14–3–3**
Pittsburgh	1–2–1	2–1–1	2–1–1	2–2	2–1–1	**9–7–4**
Washington	2–2	1–2–1	0–2–2	0–4	0–4	**3–14–3**

== Schedule and results ==
1975–76 regular season
October

Game	Result	Date	Score	Opponent	Record
1	L	October 8, 1975	0–9	@ Montreal Canadiens (1975–76)	0–1–0
2	L	October 11, 1975	0–7	@ New York Islanders (1975–76)	0–2–0
3	W	October 12, 1975	6–4	@ New York Rangers (1975–76)	1–2–0
4	W	October 15, 1975	4–3	Washington Capitals (1975–76)	2–2–0
5	W	October 17, 1975	5–3	@ Vancouver Canucks (1975–76)	3–2–0
6	W	October 18, 1975	5–3	California Golden Seals (1975–76)	4–2–0
7	L	October 21, 1975	1–6	@ St. Louis Blues (1975–76)	4–3–0
8	W	October 22, 1975	5–3	@ Chicago Black Hawks (1975–76)	5–3–0
9	L	October 24, 1975	1–7	@ Atlanta Flames (1975–76)	5–4–0
10	W	October 26, 1975	4–2	Minnesota North Stars (1975–76)	6–4–0
11	W	October 28, 1975	6–0	Washington Capitals (1975–76)	7–4–0
12	W	October 30, 1975	4–0	Pittsburgh Penguins (1975–76)	8–4–0

November

Game	Result	Date	Score	Opponent	Record
13	W	November 1, 1975	3–1	Atlanta Flames (1975–76)	9–4–0
14	W	November 5, 1975	3–1	@ Washington Capitals (1975–76)	10–4–0
15	T	November 6, 1975	1–1	@ Philadelphia Flyers (1975–76)	10–4–1
16	W	November 8, 1975	3–1	New York Rangers (1975–76)	11–4–1
17	L	November 11, 1975	2–3	California Golden Seals (1975–76)	11–5–1
18	W	November 13, 1975	4–3	New York Islanders (1975–76)	12–5–1
19	T	November 15, 1975	1–1	Toronto Maple Leafs (1975–76)	12–5–2
20	L	November 19, 1975	2–4	Chicago Black Hawks (1975–76)	12–6–2
21	L	November 22, 1975	3–6	@ Pittsburgh Penguins (1975–76)	12–7–2
22	L	November 23, 1975	1–4	@ Detroit Red Wings (1975–76)	12–8–2
23	L	November 25, 1975	2–4	@ Boston Bruins (1975–76)	12–9–2
24	L	November 26, 1975	2–7	@ Washington Capitals (1975–76)	12–10–2
25	W	November 29, 1975	8–3	Buffalo Sabres (1975–76)	13–10–2

December

Game	Result	Date	Score	Opponent	Record
26	W	December 2, 1975	5–3	Atlanta Flames (1975–76)	14–10–2
27	W	December 3, 1975	3–2	@ California Golden Seals (1975–76)	15–10–2
28	W	December 6, 1975	3–2	Detroit Red Wings (1975–76)	16–10–2
29	W	December 10, 1975	5–0	St. Louis Blues (1975–76)	17–10–2
30	L	December 13, 1975	4–6	Philadelphia Flyers (1975–76)	17–11–2
31	L	December 17, 1975	1–2	Montreal Canadiens (1975–76)	17–12–2
32	L	December 20, 1975	1–5	Pittsburgh Penguins (1975–76)	17–13–2
33	L	December 22, 1975	3–4	@ Toronto Maple Leafs (1975–76)	17–14–2
34	W	December 23, 1975	4–3	@ Boston Bruins (1975–76)	18–14–2
35	W	December 26, 1975	4–2	@ California Golden Seals (1975–76)	19–14–2
36	W	December 27, 1975	9–4	Kansas City Scouts (1975–76)	20–14–2
37	L	December 29, 1975	1–2	@ Minnesota North Stars (1975–76)	20–15–2
38	L	December 31, 1975	1–5	@ Pittsburgh Penguins (1975–76)	20–16–2

January

Game	Result	Date	Score	Opponent	Record
39	W	January 1, 1976	9–6	@ Buffalo Sabres (1975–76)	21–16–2
40	L	January 3, 1976	0–3	Boston Bruins (1975–76)	21–17–2
41	W	January 7, 1976	5–2	@ Kansas City Scouts (1975–76)	22–17–2
42	L	January 8, 1976	4–6	@ Philadelphia Flyers (1975–76)	22–18–2
43	L	January 10, 1976	3–4	@ Toronto Maple Leafs (1975–76)	22–19–2
44	W	January 13, 1976	3–0	@ Atlanta Flames (1975–76)	23–19–2
45	L	January 15, 1976	0–4	@ Boston Bruins (1975–76)	23–20–2
46	L	January 17, 1976	2–4	@ Montreal Canadiens (1975–76)	23–21–2
47	W	January 18, 1976	8–3	@ Detroit Red Wings (1975–76)	24–21–2
48	W	January 22, 1976	6–3	Toronto Maple Leafs (1975–76)	25–21–2
49	L	January 24, 1976	0–5	@ New York Islanders (1975–76)	25–22–2
50	W	January 25, 1976	4–1	@ New York Rangers (1975–76)	26–22–2
51	W	January 27, 1976	2–0	Washington Capitals (1975–76)	27–22–2
52	T	January 29, 1976	3–3	Detroit Red Wings (1975–76)	27–22–3
53	W	January 31, 1976	7–3	Montreal Canadiens (1975–76)	28–22–3

February

Game	Result	Date	Score	Opponent	Record
54	L	February 4, 1976	3–4	Buffalo Sabres (1975–76)	28–23–3
55	L	February 7, 1976	3–7	Pittsburgh Penguins (1975–76)	28–24–3
56	T	February 10, 1976	2–2	@ Washington Capitals (1975–76)	28–24–4
57	W	February 11, 1976	7–4	@ Chicago Black Hawks (1975–76)	29–24–4
58	T	February 14, 1976	2–2	@ Montreal Canadiens (1975–76)	29–24–5
59	L	February 15, 1976	4–6	@ Pittsburgh Penguins (1975–76)	29–25–5
60	W	February 17, 1976	2–1	Minnesota North Stars (1975–76)	30–25–5
61	T	February 18, 1976	2–2	St. Louis Blues (1975–76)	30–25–6
62	T	February 21, 1976	3–3	Philadelphia Flyers (1975–76)	30–25–7
63	L	February 26, 1976	2–6	Chicago Black Hawks (1975–76)	30–26–7
64	W	February 28, 1976	3–1	@ Detroit Red Wings (1975–76)	31–26–7
65	L	February 29, 1976	1–5	@ Buffalo Sabres (1975–76)	31–27–7

March

Game	Result	Date	Score	Opponent	Record
66	L	March 3, 1976	3–5	Boston Bruins (1975–76)	31–28–7
67	L	March 6, 1976	1–4	Toronto Maple Leafs (1975–76)	31–29–7
68	W	March 9, 1976	6–1	Vancouver Canucks (1975–76)	32–29–7
69	W	March 11, 1976	4–3	New York Rangers (1975–76)	33–29–7
70	L	March 13, 1976	1–4	Detroit Red Wings (1975–76)	33–30–7
71	L	March 16, 1976	2–4	Buffalo Sabres (1975–76)	33–31–7
72	W	March 20, 1976	4–3	Montreal Canadiens (1975–76)	34–31–7
73	T	March 21, 1976	4–4	@ Minnesota North Stars (1975–76)	34–31–8
74	T	March 24, 1976	1–1	New York Islanders (1975–76)	34–31–9
75	L	March 26, 1976	3–4	@ Vancouver Canucks (1975–76)	34–32–9
76	W	March 27, 1976	7–3	Vancouver Canucks (1975–76)	35–32–9
77	W	March 30, 1976	8–6	@ Kansas City Scouts (1975–76)	36–32–9
78	W	March 31, 1976	2–1	@ St. Louis Blues (1975–76)	37–32–9

April

Game	Result	Date	Score	Opponent	Record
79	W	April 3, 1976	5–1	Kansas City Scouts (1975–76)	38–32–9
80	L	April 4, 1976	2–5	@ California Golden Seals (1975–76)	38–33–9

Legend: Win (2 points) Loss (0 points) Tie (1 point)

== Playoffs ==
Mini Series

- Kings 2 Flames 1
- Kings 1 at Flames 0

Quarter Finals

- Kings 0 at Bruins 4
- Kings 3 at Bruins 2 (OT)
- Kings 6 Bruins 4
- Kings 0 Bruins 3
- Kings 1 at Bruins 7
- Kings 4 Bruins 3 (OT)
- Kings 0 at Bruins 4

== Transactions ==
The Kings were involved in the following transactions during the 1975–76 season.

=== Trades ===
August 15, 1975	To Los Angeles Kings 2nd round pick in 1976 – Steve Clippingdale	To Minnesota North Stars Tim Young
September 1, 1975	To Los Angeles Kings Cash	To Toronto Maple Leafs Tom Cassidy
January 14, 1976	To Los Angeles Kings Ab DeMarco Jr.	To Vancouver Canucks 2nd round pick in 1977 – Brian Hill
March 6, 1976	To Los Angeles Kings Bert Wilson; Curt Brackenbury	To St. Louis Blues Cash

=== Free agent signings ===
June 17, 1975	From Detroit Red Wings Marcel Dionne (5 years, $1.5 million)

=== Free agent compensation ===
June 23, 1975	To Los Angeles Kings Marcel Dionne; Bart Crashley	To Detroit Red Wings Terry Harper; Dan Maloney; 2nd round pick in 1976 – Jim Roberts

=== Intra-league draft ===
June 17, 1975	To New York Rangers Dale Lewis

== Draft picks ==
Los Angeles's draft picks at the 1975 NHL amateur draft held in Montreal.

Round	#	Player	Nationality	College/Junior/Club team (League)
1	16	Tim Young	Canada	Ottawa 67's (OMJHL)
2	33	Terry Bucyk	Canada	Lethbridge Broncos (WCHL)
4	69	Andre Leduc	Canada	Sherbrooke Castors (QMJHL)
5	87	Dave Miglia	Canada	Trois-Rivières Draveurs (QMJHL)
6	105	Bob Russell	Canada	Sudbury Wolves (OMJHL)
7	123	Dave Faulkner	Canada	Regina Pats (WCHL)
8	141	Bill Reber	United States	University of Vermont (ECAC)
9	157	Sean Sullivan	Canada	Hamilton Fincups (OMJHL)
10	172	Brian Petrovek	United States	Harvard University (ECAC)
11	186	Tom Goddard	United States	University of North Dakota (WCHA)
12	197	Mario Viens	Canada	Cornwall Royals (QMJHL)
13	203	Chuck Carpenter	United States	Yale University (ECAC)
14	207	Bob Fish	United States	Fargo Sugar Kings (MWJHL)
15	210	Dave Taylor	Canada	Clarkson University (ECAC)
16	213	Bob Shaw	Canada	Clarkson University (ECAC)

== See also ==
- 1975–76 NHL season
