= 1975–76 St. Louis Blues season =

National Hockey League team season

1975–76 St. Louis Blues
- Division: 3rd Smythe
- Conference: 6th Campbell
- 1975–76 record: 29–37–14
- Home record: 20–12–8
- Road record: 9–25–6
- Goals for: 249
- Goals against: 290

Team information
- General manager: Denis Ball
- Coach: Garry Young, Lynn Patrick, Leo Boivin
- Captain: Barclay Plager; Red Berenson
- Alternate captains: None
- Arena: St. Louis Arena

Team leaders
- Goals: Chuck Lefley (43)
- Assists: Garry Unger (44)
- Points: Chuck Lefley (85)
- Penalty minutes: Bob Gassoff (306)
- Wins: Yves Belanger (11); Eddie Johnston (11)
- Goals against average: Gilles Gratton (2.49)

The 1975–76 St. Louis Blues season was the ninth for the franchise in St. Louis, Missouri. The Blues finished the regular-season with a record of 29 wins, 37 losses and 14 ties, good for 72 points. Because of their third-place finish in the Smythe Division, the Blues qualified for the playoffs for the second consecutive year, only to lose the Buffalo Sabres, 2–1 in the preliminary round.

== Regular season ==
=== Final standings ===
Smythe Division
| | GP | W | L | T | GF | GA | Pts |
|---|---|---|---|---|---|---|---|
| **Chicago Black Hawks** | 80 | 32 | 30 | 18 | 254 | 261 | 82 |
| **Vancouver Canucks** | 80 | 33 | 32 | 15 | 271 | 272 | 81 |
| **St. Louis Blues** | 80 | 29 | 37 | 14 | 249 | 290 | 72 |
| Minnesota North Stars | 80 | 20 | 53 | 7 | 195 | 303 | 47 |
| Kansas City Scouts | 80 | 12 | 56 | 12 | 190 | 351 | 36 |

Note: GP = Games played, W = Wins, L = Losses, T = Ties, Pts = Points, GF = Goals for, GA = Goals against
Note: Teams that qualified for the playoffs are highlighted in bold.

=== Record vs. opponents ===
Smythe Division record vs. opponents

**Vs. Campbell Conference**

**Vs. Wales Conference**

**Vs. Smythe Division**

1975–76 NHL records
| Team | **CHI** | **KCS** | **MIN** | **STL** | **VAN** | **Total** |
|---|---|---|---|---|---|---|
| Chicago | — | 5–0–1 | 5–1 | 3–2–1 | 4–1–1 | **17–4–3** |
| Kansas City | 0–5–1 | — | 0–6 | 1–3–2 | 2–4 | **3–18–3** |
| Minnesota | 1–5 | 6–0 | — | 2–4 | 1–5 | **10–14–0** |
| St. Louis | 2–3–1 | 3–1–2 | 4–2 | — | 3–2–1 | **12–8–4** |
| Vancouver | 1–4–1 | 4–2 | 5–1 | 2–3–1 | — | **12–10–2** |

**Vs. Patrick Division**

1975–76 NHL records
| Team | **ATL** | **NYI** | **NYR** | **PHI** | **Total** |
|---|---|---|---|---|---|
| Chicago | 2–2–1 | 1–3–1 | 0–2–3 | 1–2–2 | **4–9–7** |
| Kansas City | 0–5 | 0–2–3 | 1–4 | 0–5 | **1–16–3** |
| Minnesota | 1–4 | 1–4 | 1–4 | 0–3–2 | **3–15–2** |
| St. Louis | 3–1–1 | 0–4–1 | 2–3 | 1–3–1 | **6–11–3** |
| Vancouver | 0–3–2 | 3–0–2 | 1–3–1 | 0–4–1 | **4–10–6** |

**Vs. Adams Division**

1975–76 NHL records
| Team | **BOS** | **BUF** | **CAL** | **TOR** | **Total** |
|---|---|---|---|---|---|
| Chicago | 0–3–1 | 0–2–2 | 1–2–1 | 2–1–1 | **3–8–5** |
| Kansas City | 1–2–1 | 0–3–1 | 2–1–1 | 0–3–1 | **3–9–4** |
| Minnesota | 0–3–1 | 0–4 | 1–3 | 1–3 | **2–13–1** |
| St. Louis | 1–2–1 | 1–2–1 | 1–2–1 | 0–2–2 | **3–8–5** |
| Vancouver | 1–2–1 | 2–1–1 | 1–2–1 | 2–1–1 | **6–6–4** |

**Vs. Norris Division**

1975–76 NHL records
| Team | **DET** | **LAK** | **MTL** | **PIT** | **WSH** | **Total** |
|---|---|---|---|---|---|---|
| Chicago | 1–2–1 | 2–2 | 1–2–1 | 2–1–1 | 2–2 | **8–9–3** |
| Kansas City | 1–3 | 0–4 | 1–3 | 1–2–1 | 2–1–1 | **5–13–2** |
| Minnesota | 1–3 | 1–2–1 | 0–4 | 1–2–1 | 2–0–2 | **5–11–4** |
| St. Louis | 1–2–1 | 1–2–1 | 0–4 | 2–2 | 4–0 | **8–10–2** |
| Vancouver | 4–0 | 1–3 | 1–1–2 | 1–2–1 | 4–0 | **11–6–3** |

== Schedule and results ==
1975–76 regular season
October

| Game | Result | Date | Score | Opponent | Record |
|---|---|---|---|---|---|
| 1 | T | October 8, 1975 | 1–1 | @ Detroit Red Wings (1975–76) | 0–0–1 |
| 2 | L | October 11, 1975 | 2–7 | @ Montreal Canadiens (1975–76) | 0–1–1 |
| 3 | W | October 14, 1975 | 5–1 | Kansas City Scouts (1975–76) | 1–1–1 |
| 4 | L | October 16, 1975 | 2–3 | @ Philadelphia Flyers (1975–76) | 1–2–1 |
| 5 | L | October 18, 1975 | 3–5 | Buffalo Sabres (1975–76) | 1–3–1 |
| 6 | W | October 21, 1975 | 6–1 | Los Angeles Kings (1975–76) | 2–3–1 |
| 7 | T | October 22, 1975 | 1–1 | @ Atlanta Flames (1975–76) | 2–3–2 |
| 8 | W | October 25, 1975 | 7–3 | Atlanta Flames (1975–76) | 3–3–2 |
| 9 | L | October 29, 1975 | 1–3 | @ New York Rangers (1975–76) | 3–4–2 |
| 10 | L | October 30, 1975 | 2–3 | @ Boston Bruins (1975–76) | 3–5–2 |

November

| Game | Result | Date | Score | Opponent | Record |
|---|---|---|---|---|---|
| 11 | T | November 1, 1975 | 3–3 | Vancouver Canucks (1975–76) | 3–5–3 |
| 12 | W | November 5, 1975 | 4–1 | @ Minnesota North Stars (1975–76) | 4–5–3 |
| 13 | L | November 6, 1975 | 3–5 | Pittsburgh Penguins (1975–76) | 4–6–3 |
| 14 | T | November 8, 1975 | 3–3 | Toronto Maple Leafs (1975–76) | 4–6–4 |
| 15 | W | November 9, 1975 | 5–3 | @ Washington Capitals (1975–76) | 5–6–4 |
| 16 | W | November 11, 1975 | 5–3 | New York Rangers (1975–76) | 6–6–4 |
| 17 | W | November 15, 1975 | 9–2 | Washington Capitals (1975–76) | 7–6–4 |
| 18 | L | November 18, 1975 | 1–5 | Minnesota North Stars (1975–76) | 7–7–4 |
| 19 | W | November 22, 1975 | 5–1 | Detroit Red Wings (1975–76) | 8–7–4 |
| 20 | T | November 26, 1975 | 3–3 | Kansas City Scouts (1975–76) | 8–7–5 |
| 21 | L | November 27, 1975 | 2–3 | @ Kansas City Scouts (1975–76) | 8–8–5 |
| 22 | L | November 29, 1975 | 2–8 | @ New York Islanders (1975–76) | 8–9–5 |
| 23 | L | November 30, 1975 | 2–5 | @ New York Rangers (1975–76) | 8–10–5 |

December

| Game | Result | Date | Score | Opponent | Record |
|---|---|---|---|---|---|
| 24 | L | December 2, 1975 | 1–4 | New York Islanders (1975–76) | 8–11–5 |
| 25 | L | December 4, 1975 | 1–4 | Montreal Canadiens (1975–76) | 8–12–5 |
| 26 | W | December 6, 1975 | 7–2 | Philadelphia Flyers (1975–76) | 9–12–5 |
| 27 | L | December 9, 1975 | 3–5 | @ Vancouver Canucks (1975–76) | 9–13–5 |
| 28 | L | December 10, 1975 | 0–5 | @ Los Angeles Kings (1975–76) | 9–14–5 |
| 29 | L | December 12, 1975 | 2–5 | @ California Golden Seals (1975–76) | 9–15–5 |
| 30 | W | December 14, 1975 | 4–3 | @ Chicago Black Hawks (1975–76) | 10–15–5 |
| 31 | L | December 17, 1975 | 2–6 | @ Toronto Maple Leafs (1975–76) | 10–16–5 |
| 32 | L | December 20, 1975 | 1–7 | New York Islanders (1975–76) | 10–17–5 |
| 33 | L | December 21, 1975 | 3–8 | @ Philadelphia Flyers (1975–76) | 10–18–5 |
| 34 | L | December 23, 1975 | 1–4 | @ Chicago Black Hawks (1975–76) | 10–19–5 |
| 35 | W | December 27, 1975 | 4–2 | Vancouver Canucks (1975–76) | 11–19–5 |

January

| Game | Result | Date | Score | Opponent | Record |
|---|---|---|---|---|---|
| 36 | L | January 2, 1976 | 1–7 | @ Atlanta Flames (1975–76) | 11–20–5 |
| 37 | W | January 3, 1976 | 3–2 | Minnesota North Stars (1975–76) | 12–20–5 |
| 38 | W | January 6, 1976 | 5–2 | New York Rangers (1975–76) | 13–20–5 |
| 39 | W | January 8, 1976 | 4–2 | Washington Capitals (1975–76) | 14–20–5 |
| 40 | L | January 10, 1976 | 0–2 | @ Minnesota North Stars (1975–76) | 14–21–5 |
| 41 | W | January 13, 1976 | 7–3 | Buffalo Sabres (1975–76) | 15–21–5 |
| 42 | W | January 15, 1976 | 5–3 | @ Atlanta Flames (1975–76) | 16–21–5 |
| 43 | W | January 17, 1976 | 7–5 | Boston Bruins (1975–76) | 17–21–5 |
| 44 | W | January 21, 1976 | 4–2 | @ Kansas City Scouts (1975–76) | 18–21–5 |
| 45 | L | January 24, 1976 | 1–2 | Chicago Black Hawks (1975–76) | 18–22–5 |
| 46 | L | January 25, 1976 | 2–4 | @ Buffalo Sabres (1975–76) | 18–23–5 |
| 47 | L | January 27, 1976 | 2–3 | Detroit Red Wings (1975–76) | 18–24–5 |
| 48 | L | January 29, 1976 | 3–6 | New York Rangers (1975–76) | 18–25–5 |
| 49 | T | January 31, 1976 | 2–2 | New York Islanders (1975–76) | 18–25–6 |

February

| Game | Result | Date | Score | Opponent | Record |
|---|---|---|---|---|---|
| 50 | T | February 3, 1976 | 4–4 | California Golden Seals (1975–76) | 18–25–7 |
| 51 | T | February 4, 1976 | 3–3 | @ Kansas City Scouts (1975–76) | 18–25–8 |
| 52 | W | February 6, 1976 | 5–3 | Vancouver Canucks (1975–76) | 19–25–8 |
| 53 | L | February 7, 1976 | 2–8 | @ Philadelphia Flyers (1975–76) | 19–26–8 |
| 54 | L | February 10, 1976 | 1–6 | @ Montreal Canadiens (1975–76) | 19–27–8 |
| 55 | W | February 13, 1976 | 2–0 | @ Washington Capitals (1975–76) | 20–27–8 |
| 56 | W | February 14, 1976 | 5–3 | Atlanta Flames (1975–76) | 21–27–8 |
| 57 | W | February 16, 1976 | 4–2 | California Golden Seals (1975–76) | 22–27–8 |
| 58 | T | February 18, 1976 | 2–2 | @ Los Angeles Kings (1975–76) | 22–27–9 |
| 59 | L | February 21, 1976 | 4–5 | @ Vancouver Canucks (1975–76) | 22–28–9 |
| 60 | L | February 24, 1976 | 2–6 | Montreal Canadiens (1975–76) | 22–29–9 |
| 61 | L | February 26, 1976 | 2–4 | @ Boston Bruins (1975–76) | 22–30–9 |
| 62 | T | February 28, 1976 | 2–2 | Philadelphia Flyers (1975–76) | 22–30–10 |
| 63 | W | February 29, 1976 | 5–3 | @ Pittsburgh Penguins (1975–76) | 23–30–10 |

March

| Game | Result | Date | Score | Opponent | Record |
|---|---|---|---|---|---|
| 64 | L | March 3, 1976 | 1–4 | Toronto Maple Leafs (1975–76) | 23–31–10 |
| 65 | W | March 6, 1976 | 7–4 | Chicago Black Hawks (1975–76) | 24–31–10 |
| 66 | T | March 7, 1976 | 4–4 | @ Buffalo Sabres (1975–76) | 24–31–11 |
| 67 | L | March 9, 1976 | 0–4 | @ New York Islanders (1975–76) | 24–32–11 |
| 68 | T | March 10, 1976 | 2–2 | @ Toronto Maple Leafs (1975–76) | 24–32–12 |
| 69 | W | March 13, 1976 | 5–3 | Kansas City Scouts (1975–76) | 25–32–12 |
| 70 | L | March 14, 1976 | 1–7 | @ Pittsburgh Penguins (1975–76) | 25–33–12 |
| 71 | T | March 16, 1976 | 3–3 | Boston Bruins (1975–76) | 25–33–13 |
| 72 | L | March 18, 1976 | 3–6 | @ Detroit Red Wings (1975–76) | 25–34–13 |
| 73 | W | March 21, 1976 | 5–2 | @ Vancouver Canucks (1975–76) | 26–34–13 |
| 74 | L | March 22, 1976 | 1–7 | @ California Golden Seals (1975–76) | 26–35–13 |
| 75 | W | March 25, 1976 | 5–2 | Pittsburgh Penguins (1975–76) | 27–35–13 |
| 76 | W | March 27, 1976 | 6–3 | Minnesota North Stars (1975–76) | 28–35–13 |
| 77 | W | March 30, 1976 | 5–3 | @ Minnesota North Stars (1975–76) | 29–35–13 |
| 78 | L | March 31, 1976 | 1–2 | Los Angeles Kings (1975–76) | 29–36–13 |

April

| Game | Result | Date | Score | Opponent | Record |
|---|---|---|---|---|---|
| 79 | T | April 3, 1976 | 3–3 | Chicago Black Hawks (1975–76) | 29–36–14 |
| 80 | L | April 4, 1976 | 2–7 | @ Chicago Black Hawks (1975–76) | 29–37–14 |

Legend: Win (2 points) Loss (0 points) Tie (1 point)

== Player statistics ==
=== Regular season ===
Scoring

| Player | Pos | GP | G | A | Pts | PIM | +/- | PPG | SHG | GWG |
|---|---|---|---|---|---|---|---|---|---|---|
| Chuck Lefley | LW | 75 | 43 | 42 | 85 | 41 | 15 | 4 | 8 | 9 |
| Garry Unger | C | 80 | 39 | 44 | 83 | 95 | 1 | 13 | 0 | 3 |
| Derek Sanderson | C | 65 | 24 | 43 | 67 | 59 | 13 | 6 | 6 | 1 |
| Bob MacMillan | RW | 80 | 20 | 32 | 52 | 41 | 13 | 2 | 1 | 2 |
| Red Berenson | C | 72 | 20 | 27 | 47 | 47 | −11 | 9 | 2 | 1 |
| Jerry Butler | RW | 66 | 17 | 24 | 41 | 75 | 0 | 1 | 0 | 3 |
| Claude Larose | RW | 67 | 13 | 25 | 38 | 48 | 7 | 3 | 0 | 0 |
| Pierre Plante | RW | 74 | 14 | 19 | 33 | 77 | −22 | 5 | 0 | 2 |
| Bob Hess | D | 78 | 9 | 23 | 32 | 58 | 3 | 2 | 2 | 2 |
| Bruce Affleck | D | 80 | 4 | 26 | 30 | 20 | 3 | 3 | 0 | 1 |
| Ted Irvine | LW | 69 | 10 | 13 | 23 | 80 | −12 | 2 | 0 | 2 |
| Floyd Thomson | LW | 58 | 8 | 10 | 18 | 25 | −4 | 0 | 0 | 1 |
| Wayne Merrick | C | 19 | 7 | 8 | 15 | 0 | 0 | 1 | 0 | 0 |
| Larry Patey | C | 53 | 8 | 6 | 14 | 26 | −12 | 2 | 1 | 0 |
| Bob Gassoff | D | 80 | 1 | 12 | 13 | 306 | −8 | 0 | 0 | 0 |
| Bob Plager | D | 63 | 3 | 8 | 11 | 90 | 17 | 0 | 1 | 1 |
| Rick Smith | D | 24 | 1 | 7 | 8 | 18 | 2 | 0 | 0 | 0 |
| Barclay Plager | D | 64 | 0 | 8 | 8 | 67 | −6 | 0 | 0 | 0 |
| Rick Wilson | D | 65 | 1 | 6 | 7 | 20 | −10 | 1 | 0 | 0 |
| Dave Hrechkosy | LW | 13 | 3 | 3 | 6 | 0 | 2 | 1 | 0 | 0 |
| Bert Wilson | LW | 45 | 2 | 3 | 5 | 47 | −6 | 0 | 0 | 1 |
| Brian Ogilvie | C | 9 | 2 | 1 | 3 | 2 | −1 | 0 | 0 | 0 |
| Yves Belanger | G | 31 | 0 | 2 | 2 | 4 | 0 | 0 | 0 | 0 |
| Mitch Babin | C | 8 | 0 | 0 | 0 | 0 | −2 | 0 | 0 | 0 |
| Rick Bourbonnais | RW | 7 | 0 | 0 | 0 | 8 | −1 | 0 | 0 | 0 |
| Bruce Cowick | LW | 5 | 0 | 0 | 0 | 2 | 1 | 0 | 0 | 0 |
| Gilles Gratton | G | 6 | 0 | 0 | 0 | 2 | 0 | 0 | 0 | 0 |
| Eddie Johnston | G | 38 | 0 | 0 | 0 | 0 | 0 | 0 | 0 | 0 |
| Jamie Masters | D | 7 | 0 | 0 | 0 | 0 | 4 | 0 | 0 | 0 |
| Ed Staniowski | G | 11 | 0 | 0 | 0 | 0 | 0 | 0 | 0 | 0 |

Goaltending

| Player | MIN | GP | W | L | T | GA | GAA | SO |
|---|---|---|---|---|---|---|---|---|
| Yves Belanger | 1763 | 31 | 11 | 17 | 1 | 113 | 3.85 | 0 |
| Eddie Johnston | 2152 | 38 | 11 | 17 | 9 | 130 | 3.62 | 1 |
| Ed Staniowski | 620 | 11 | 5 | 3 | 2 | 33 | 3.19 | 0 |
| Gilles Gratton | 265 | 6 | 2 | 0 | 2 | 11 | 2.49 | 0 |
| Team: | 4800 | 80 | 29 | 37 | 14 | 287 | 3.59 | 1 |

=== Playoffs ===
Scoring

| Player | Pos | GP | G | A | Pts | PIM | PPG | SHG | GWG |
|---|---|---|---|---|---|---|---|---|---|
| Chuck Lefley | LW | 2 | 2 | 1 | 3 | 0 | 0 | 1 | 0 |
| Garry Unger | C | 3 | 2 | 1 | 3 | 7 | 0 | 0 | 0 |
| Red Berenson | C | 3 | 1 | 2 | 3 | 0 | 0 | 0 | 0 |
| Larry Patey | C | 3 | 1 | 1 | 2 | 2 | 1 | 0 | 1 |
| Ted Irvine | LW | 3 | 0 | 2 | 2 | 2 | 0 | 0 | 0 |
| Dave Hrechkosy | LW | 3 | 1 | 0 | 1 | 2 | 0 | 0 | 0 |
| Derek Sanderson | C | 3 | 1 | 0 | 1 | 0 | 1 | 0 | 0 |
| Bob Hess | D | 1 | 0 | 1 | 1 | 0 | 0 | 0 | 0 |
| Bob MacMillan | RW | 3 | 0 | 1 | 1 | 0 | 0 | 0 | 0 |
| Rick Smith | D | 3 | 0 | 1 | 1 | 4 | 0 | 0 | 0 |
| Bruce Affleck | D | 3 | 0 | 0 | 0 | 0 | 0 | 0 | 0 |
| Jerry Butler | RW | 3 | 0 | 0 | 0 | 0 | 0 | 0 | 0 |
| Bob Gassoff | D | 3 | 0 | 0 | 0 | 6 | 0 | 0 | 0 |
| Claude Larose | RW | 3 | 0 | 0 | 0 | 0 | 0 | 0 | 0 |
| Jamie Masters | D | 1 | 0 | 0 | 0 | 0 | 0 | 0 | 0 |
| Barclay Plager | D | 1 | 0 | 0 | 0 | 13 | 0 | 0 | 0 |
| Bob Plager | D | 3 | 0 | 0 | 0 | 2 | 0 | 0 | 0 |
| Pierre Plante | RW | 3 | 0 | 0 | 0 | 6 | 0 | 0 | 0 |
| Ed Staniowski | G | 3 | 0 | 0 | 0 | 0 | 0 | 0 | 0 |
| Rick Wilson | D | 1 | 0 | 0 | 0 | 0 | 0 | 0 | 0 |

Goaltending

| Player | MIN | GP | W | L | GA | GAA | SO |
|---|---|---|---|---|---|---|---|
| Ed Staniowski | 206 | 3 | 1 | 2 | 7 | 2.04 | 0 |
| Team: | 206 | 3 | 1 | 2 | 7 | 2.04 | 0 |

Note:

Pos = Position;GP = Games played; G = Goals; A = Assists; Pts = Points; PIM = Penalty minutes; +/- = Plus/minus; PPG = Power-play goals; SHG = Short-handed goals; GWG = Game-winning goals
Pos = Position;GP = Games played; Min, TOI = Minutes played; W = Wins; L = Losses; T,T/OT = Ties; OTL = Overtime losses; GA = Goals-against; GAA = Goals-against average; SO = Shutouts; SA = Shots against; SV = Shots saved;SV% = Save percentage;

== Draft picks ==
St. Louis's draft picks at the 1975 NHL amateur draft held in Montreal.

| Round | # | Player | Nationality | College/Junior/Club team (League) |
|---|---|---|---|---|
| 2 | 27 | Ed Staniowski | Canada | Regina Pats (WCHL) |
| 2 | 36 | Jamie Masters | Canada | Ottawa 67's (OMJHL) |
| 4 | 63 | Rick Bourbonnais | Canada | Ottawa 67's (OMJHL) |
| 5 | 81 | Jim Gustafson | Canada | Victoria Cougars (WCHL) |
| 6 | 99 | Jack Brownschidle | United States | University of Notre Dame (WCHA) |
| 7 | 117 | Doug Lindskog | Canada | University of Michigan (WCHA) |
| 8 | 135 | Dick Lamby | United States | Salem State University (ECAC) |
| 9 | 151 | David McNab | United States | University of Wisconsin (WCHA) |

== See also ==
- 1975–76 NHL season
