= 1975–76 Kansas City Scouts season =

NHL hockey team season (final season in Kansas City)

1975–76 Kansas City Scouts
- Division: 5th Smythe
- Conference: 9th Campbell
- 1975–76 record: 12–56–12
- Home record: 8–24–8
- Road record: 4–32–4
- Goals for: 190
- Goals against: 351

Team information
- General manager: Sid Abel
- Coach: Bep Guidolin (Oct–Jan); Sid Abel (Jan); Eddie Bush (Jan–Apr)
- Captain: Simon Nolet (Oct–Jan); Guy Charron (Jan–Apr)
- Alternate captains: None
- Arena: Kemper Arena

Team leaders
- Goals: Guy Charron (27)
- Assists: Guy Charron (44)
- Points: Guy Charron (71)
- Penalty minutes: Steve Durbano (209)
- Wins: Denis Herron (11)
- Goals against average: Bill Oleschuk (4.00)

The 1975–76 Kansas City Scouts season was the second and final season for the NHL franchise in Kansas City, Missouri. They played their home games at Kemper Arena. The Scouts started the season by going 11–21–4 in their first 36 games, but after their December 28 win against the California Golden Seals, the Scouts won only once in their final 44 games, going 1–35–8, and went 12–56–12 for 36 points, the second-worst in the NHL.

The last four games the Scouts ever played took place in Japan. Following the conclusion of the 1975–76 regular season, Kansas City and Washington participated in an exhibition series with the first two games played in Sapporo (site of the 1972 Winter Olympics), the third and fourth in Tokyo at Yoyogi National Gymnasium, site of the swimming and diving competition at the 1964 Summer Olympics. The Capitals won the first three contests. On April 18, 1976, the Scouts defeated Washington 4–2. Thus, Kansas City won its final game but it did not count in the NHL standings.

During late July 1976, the Scouts left Kansas City to go to Denver to become the Colorado Rockies, ending their two-year stint in Kansas City.

== Regular season ==
=== Final standings ===
Smythe Division
	GP	W	L	T	GF	GA	Pts
**Chicago Black Hawks**	80	32	30	18	254	261	82
**Vancouver Canucks**	80	33	32	15	271	272	81
**St. Louis Blues**	80	29	37	14	249	290	72
Minnesota North Stars	80	20	53	7	195	303	47
Kansas City Scouts	80	12	56	12	190	351	36

Note: GP = Games played, W = Wins, L = Losses, T = Ties, Pts = Points, GF = Goals for, GA = Goals against
Note: Teams that qualified for the playoffs are highlighted in bold.

=== Record vs. opponents ===
Smythe Division record vs. opponents

**Vs. Campbell Conference**

**Vs. Wales Conference**

**Vs. Smythe Division**

1975–76 NHL records
Team	**CHI**	**KCS**	**MIN**	**STL**	**VAN**	**Total**
Chicago	—	5–0–1	5–1	3–2–1	4–1–1	**17–4–3**
Kansas City	0–5–1	—	0–6	1–3–2	2–4	**3–18–3**
Minnesota	1–5	6–0	—	2–4	1–5	**10–14–0**
St. Louis	2–3–1	3–1–2	4–2	—	3–2–1	**12–8–4**
Vancouver	1–4–1	4–2	5–1	2–3–1	—	**12–10–2**

**Vs. Patrick Division**

1975–76 NHL records
Team	**ATL**	**NYI**	**NYR**	**PHI**	**Total**
Chicago	2–2–1	1–3–1	0–2–3	1–2–2	**4–9–7**
Kansas City	0–5	0–2–3	1–4	0–5	**1–16–3**
Minnesota	1–4	1–4	1–4	0–3–2	**3–15–2**
St. Louis	3–1–1	0–4–1	2–3	1–3–1	**6–11–3**
Vancouver	0–3–2	3–0–2	1–3–1	0–4–1	**4–10–6**

**Vs. Adams Division**

1975–76 NHL records
Team	**BOS**	**BUF**	**CAL**	**TOR**	**Total**
Chicago	0–3–1	0–2–2	1–2–1	2–1–1	**3–8–5**
Kansas City	1–2–1	0–3–1	2–1–1	0–3–1	**3–9–4**
Minnesota	0–3–1	0–4	1–3	1–3	**2–13–1**
St. Louis	1–2–1	1–2–1	1–2–1	0–2–2	**3–8–5**
Vancouver	1–2–1	2–1–1	1–2–1	2–1–1	**6–6–4**

**Vs. Norris Division**

1975–76 NHL records
Team	**DET**	**LAK**	**MTL**	**PIT**	**WSH**	**Total**
Chicago	1–2–1	2–2	1–2–1	2–1–1	2–2	**8–9–3**
Kansas City	1–3	0–4	1–3	1–2–1	2–1–1	**5–13–2**
Minnesota	1–3	1–2–1	0–4	1–2–1	2–0–2	**5–11–4**
St. Louis	1–2–1	1–2–1	0–4	2–2	4–0	**8–10–2**
Vancouver	4–0	1–3	1–1–2	1–2–1	4–0	**11–6–3**

=== Game log ===
1975–76 regular season
October

Game	Result	Date	Score	Opponent	Record
1	T	October 8, 1975	1–1	New York Islanders (1975–76)	0–0–1
2	W	October 11, 1975	4–2	Vancouver Canucks (1975–76)	1–0–1
3	L	October 14, 1975	1–5	@ St. Louis Blues (1975–76)	1–1–1
4	L	October 18, 1975	3–5	Atlanta Flames (1975–76)	1–2–1
5	W	October 22, 1975	4–2	@ Washington Capitals (1975–76)	2–2–1
6	W	October 23, 1975	3–2	@ Boston Bruins (1975–76)	3–2–1
7	L	October 25, 1975	0–4	Chicago Black Hawks (1975–76)	3–3–1
8	L	October 29, 1975	0–2	@ Minnesota North Stars (1975–76)	3–4–1
9	L	October 30, 1975	2–6	Washington Capitals (1975–76)	3–5–1

November

Game	Result	Date	Score	Opponent	Record
10	L	November 1, 1975	0–3	@ Toronto Maple Leafs (1975–76)	3–6–1
11	L	November 2, 1975	0–10	@ Philadelphia Flyers (1975–76)	3–7–1
12	W	November 5, 1975	3–2	California Golden Seals (1975–76)	4–7–1
13	T	November 7, 1975	3–3	Toronto Maple Leafs (1975–76)	4–7–2
14	L	November 12, 1975	1–2	@ Atlanta Flames (1975–76)	4–8–2
15	L	November 13, 1975	3–6	@ Detroit Red Wings (1975–76)	4–9–2
16	L	November 16, 1975	2–4	@ Boston Bruins (1975–76)	4–10–2
17	W	November 19, 1975	6–4	@ New York Rangers (1975–76)	5–10–2
18	L	November 22, 1975	2–5	@ New York Islanders (1975–76)	5–11–2
19	L	November 23, 1975	2–6	@ Buffalo Sabres (1975–76)	5–12–2
20	T	November 26, 1975	3–3	@ St. Louis Blues (1975–76)	5–12–3
21	W	November 27, 1975	3–2	St. Louis Blues (1975–76)	6–12–3
22	L	November 29, 1975	3–5	Detroit Red Wings (1975–76)	6–13–3
23	T	November 30, 1975	1–1	@ Chicago Black Hawks (1975–76)	6–13–4

December

Game	Result	Date	Score	Opponent	Record
24	W	December 3, 1975	6–5	Montreal Canadiens (1975–76)	7–13–4
25	L	December 5, 1975	2–3	New York Rangers (1975–76)	7–14–4
26	L	December 6, 1975	0–4	@ Minnesota North Stars (1975–76)	7–15–4
27	W	December 9, 1975	3–2	Pittsburgh Penguins (1975–76)	8–15–4
28	L	December 11, 1975	3–5	Minnesota North Stars (1975–76)	8–16–4
29	L	December 13, 1975	1–4	@ Montreal Canadiens (1975–76)	8–17–4
30	L	December 16, 1975	1–3	@ Atlanta Flames (1975–76)	8–18–4
31	W	December 17, 1975	6–5	Vancouver Canucks (1975–76)	9–18–4
32	W	December 19, 1975	4–1	Detroit Red Wings (1975–76)	10–18–4
33	L	December 20, 1975	1–5	@ Toronto Maple Leafs (1975–76)	10–19–4
34	L	December 23, 1975	1–5	Buffalo Sabres (1975–76)	10–20–4
35	L	December 27, 1975	4–9	@ Los Angeles Kings (1975–76)	10–21–4
36	W	December 28, 1975	3–1	@ California Golden Seals (1975–76)	11–21–4
37	L	December 30, 1975	2–5	@ Vancouver Canucks (1975–76)	11–22–4

January

Game	Result	Date	Score	Opponent	Record
38	L	January 1, 1976	2–4	Philadelphia Flyers (1975–76)	11–23–4
39	L	January 3, 1976	4–6	Atlanta Flames (1975–76)	11–24–4
40	L	January 6, 1976	1–8	@ New York Islanders (1975–76)	11–25–4
41	L	January 7, 1976	2–5	Los Angeles Kings (1975–76)	11–26–4
42	L	January 10, 1976	4–8	New York Rangers (1975–76)	11–27–4
43	L	January 14, 1976	3–8	@ Detroit Red Wings (1975–76)	11–28–4
44	L	January 15, 1976	4–6	Toronto Maple Leafs (1975–76)	11–29–4
45	L	January 17, 1976	1–7	Philadelphia Flyers (1975–76)	11–30–4
46	L	January 21, 1976	2–4	St. Louis Blues (1975–76)	11–31–4
47	L	January 23, 1976	1–4	@ California Golden Seals (1975–76)	11–32–4
48	L	January 25, 1976	1–3	@ Chicago Black Hawks (1975–76)	11–33–4
49	L	January 28, 1976	3–9	@ Minnesota North Stars (1975–76)	11–34–4
50	L	January 29, 1976	2–6	@ Pittsburgh Penguins (1975–76)	11–35–4
51	T	January 31, 1976	4–4	Pittsburgh Penguins (1975–76)	11–35–5

February

Game	Result	Date	Score	Opponent	Record
52	T	February 4, 1976	3–3	St. Louis Blues (1975–76)	11–35–6
53	W	February 7, 1976	5–1	Washington Capitals (1975–76)	12–35–6
54	T	February 12, 1976	2–2	New York Islanders (1975–76)	12–35–7
55	L	February 14, 1976	4–5	Chicago Black Hawks (1975–76)	12–36–7
56	L	February 15, 1976	1–5	@ New York Rangers (1975–76)	12–37–7
57	L	February 17, 1976	1–6	@ Pittsburgh Penguins (1975–76)	12–38–7
58	T	February 18, 1976	3–3	Boston Bruins (1975–76)	12–38–8
59	L	February 20, 1976	1–3	Atlanta Flames (1975–76)	12–39–8
60	L	February 22, 1976	3–6	Minnesota North Stars (1975–76)	12–40–8
61	L	February 25, 1976	1–3	Montreal Canadiens (1975–76)	12–41–8
62	T	February 26, 1976	2–2	@ New York Islanders (1975–76)	12–41–9
63	T	February 28, 1976	4–4	Buffalo Sabres (1975–76)	12–41–10

March

Game	Result	Date	Score	Opponent	Record
64	L	March 4, 1976	1–6	Philadelphia Flyers (1975–76)	12–42–10
65	L	March 6, 1976	3–5	Vancouver Canucks (1975–76)	12–43–10
66	L	March 7, 1976	1–4	@ Philadelphia Flyers (1975–76)	12–44–10
67	L	March 10, 1976	1–3	@ Vancouver Canucks (1975–76)	12–45–10
68	L	March 13, 1976	3–5	@ St. Louis Blues (1975–76)	12–46–10
69	L	March 16, 1976	3–6	Chicago Black Hawks (1975–76)	12–47–10
70	L	March 18, 1976	2–5	Boston Bruins (1975–76)	12–48–10
71	T	March 20, 1976	2–2	California Golden Seals (1975–76)	12–48–11
72	L	March 21, 1976	1–3	@ Buffalo Sabres (1975–76)	12–49–11
73	T	March 23, 1976	5–5	@ Washington Capitals (1975–76)	12–49–12
74	L	March 24, 1976	1–4	Minnesota North Stars (1975–76)	12–50–12
75	L	March 27, 1976	2–8	@ Montreal Canadiens (1975–76)	12–51–12
76	L	March 28, 1976	2–4	@ New York Rangers (1975–76)	12–52–12
77	L	March 30, 1976	6–8	Los Angeles Kings (1975–76)	12–53–12
78	L	March 31, 1976	3–6	@ Chicago Black Hawks (1975–76)	12–54–12

April

Game	Result	Date	Score	Opponent	Record
79	L	April 3, 1976	1–5	@ Los Angeles Kings (1975–76)	12–55–12
80	L	April 4, 1976	2–5	@ Vancouver Canucks (1975–76)	12–56–12

**Legend**: Win (2 points) Loss (0 points) Tie (1 point)

== Player statistics ==
=== Regular season ===
Scoring

Player	Pos	GP	G	A	Pts	PIM	+/-	PPG	SHG	GWG
Guy Charron	C	78	27	44	71	12	−51	9	0	4
Wilf Paiement	RW	57	21	22	43	121	−37	4	0	3
Gary Bergman	D	75	5	33	38	82	−52	1	0	1
Craig Patrick	RW	80	17	18	35	14	−24	3	1	0
Gary Croteau	LW	79	19	14	33	12	−24	4	0	1
Robin Burns	LW	78	13	18	31	37	−40	2	0	0
Dave Hudson	C	74	11	20	31	12	−28	2	0	0
Randy Rota	C/LW	71	12	14	26	14	−38	2	0	1
Simon Nolet	RW	41	10	15	25	16	−9	2	0	1
Chuck Arnason	RW	39	14	10	24	21	−35	5	0	0
Phil Roberto	RW	37	7	15	22	42	−11	3	0	0
Dennis Patterson	D	69	5	16	21	28	−28	0	0	0
Buster Harvey	RW	39	5	12	17	6	−31	0	0	0
Denis Dupere	LW	43	6	8	14	16	−8	2	0	0
Jean-Guy Lagace	D	69	3	10	13	108	−38	1	1	1
Ed Gilbert	C	41	4	8	12	8	−29	1	0	0
Larry Johnston	D	72	2	10	12	112	−61	1	0	0
Steve Durbano	D	37	1	11	12	209	−30	0	0	0
Henry Boucha	C	28	4	7	11	14	−13	2	0	0
Germain Gagnon	LW	31	1	9	10	6	−14	1	0	0
Jim McElmury	D	38	2	6	8	6	−13	1	0	0
Hugh Harvey	C/LW	10	1	1	2	2	−5	0	0	0
Claude Houde	D	25	0	2	2	20	−13	0	0	0
Ken Murray	D	23	0	2	2	24	−1	0	0	0
Terry McDonald	D	8	0	1	1	6	−5	0	0	0
Bill McKenzie	G	22	0	1	1	4	0	0	0	0
Don Cairns	LW	7	0	0	0	0	−1	0	0	0
Norm Dube	LW	1	0	0	0	0	0	0	0	0
Denis Herron	G	64	0	0	0	16	0	0	0	0
Roger Lemelin	D	11	0	0	0	0	−1	0	0	0
Rich Lemieux	C	2	0	0	0	0	0	0	0	0
Bill Oleschuk	G	1	0	0	0	0	0	0	0	0

Goaltending

Player	MIN	GP	W	L	T	GA	GAA	SO
Denis Herron	3620	64	11	39	11	243	4.03	0
Bill McKenzie	1120	22	1	16	1	97	5.20	0
Bill Oleschuk	60	1	0	1	0	4	4.00	0
Team:	4800	80	12	56	12	344	4.30	0

Note: GP = Games played; G = Goals; A = Assists; Pts = Points; +/- = Plus/minus; PIM = Penalty minutes; PPG=Power-play goals; SHG=Short-handed goals; GWG=Game-winning goals
MIN=Minutes played; W = Wins; L = Losses; T = Ties; GA = Goals against; GAA = Goals against average; SO = Shutouts;

== Transactions ==
=== Trades ===
August 22, 1975	To Detroit Red Wings Peter McDuffe; Glen Burdon	To Kansas City Scouts Bill McKenzie; Gary Bergman
October 1, 1975	To Buffalo Sabres cash	To Kansas City Scouts Rocky Farr
October 13, 1975	To Atlanta Flames Richard Lemieux; Kansas City's 2nd round draft pick 1977 NHL entry draft	To Kansas City Scouts Buster Harvey
November 1, 1975	To Detroit Red Wings Hank Lehvonen	To Kansas City Scouts Frank Bathe
December 9, 1975	To Minnesota North Stars Kansas City's 2nd round draft pick 1978 NHL entry draft	To Kansas City Scouts Henry Boucha
January 9, 1976	To Pittsburgh Penguins Simon Nolet; Ed Gilbert; Kansas City's 1st round draft pick 1976 NHL entry draft	To Kansas City Scouts Steve Durbano; Chuck Arnason; Pittsburgh's 1st round draft pick 1976 NHL entry draft
January 14, 1976	To Detroit Red Wings Buster Harvey	To Kansas City Scouts Phil Roberto

=== Waivers ===
October 28, 1975	From Chicago Black Hawks Germain Gagnon

== Draft picks ==
Kansas City's draft picks at the 1975 NHL amateur draft held in Montreal.

Round	#	Player	Nationality	College/Junior/Club team (League)
1	2	Barry Dean	Canada	Medicine Hat Tigers (WCHL)
2	20	Don Cairns	Canada	Victoria Cougars (WCHL)
3	38	Neil Lyseng	Canada	Kamloops Chiefs (WCHL)
4	56	Ron Delorme	Canada	Lethbridge Broncos (WCHL)
5	74	Terry McDonald	Canada	Kamloops Chiefs (WCHL)
6	92	Eric Sanderson	Canada	Victoria Cougars (WCHL)
7	110	Bill Oleschuk	Canada	Saskatoon Blades (WCHL)
8	128	Joe Baker	United States	University of Minnesota (WCHA)
9	145	Scott Williams	Canada	Flin Flon Bombers (WCHL)

== Farm teams ==
Kansas City's International Hockey League affiliate was the Port Huron Flags. During the course of the 1975–76 season, the Scouts assigned players to the American Hockey League's Springfield Indians.

== See also ==
- 1975–76 NHL season
