= 1975–76 New York Islanders season =

NHL hockey team season

1975–76 New York Islanders
- Division: 2nd Patrick
- Conference: 2nd Campbell
- 1975–76 record: 42–21–17
- Home record: 24–8–8
- Road record: 18–13–9
- Goals for: 297
- Goals against: 190

Team information
- General manager: Bill Torrey
- Coach: Al Arbour
- Captain: Ed Westfall
- Alternate captains: None
- Arena: Nassau Coliseum

Team leaders
- Goals: Clark Gillies (34)
- Assists: Denis Potvin (67)
- Points: Denis Potvin (98)
- Penalty minutes: Garry Howatt (197)
- Wins: Chico Resch (23)
- Goals against average: Chico Resch (2.61)

The 1975–76 New York Islanders season was the fourth season for the franchise in the National Hockey League (NHL).

== Regular season ==
=== Final standings ===
Patrick Division
	GP	W	L	T	GF	GA	Pts
**Philadelphia Flyers**	80	51	13	16	348	209	118
**New York Islanders**	80	42	21	17	297	190	101
**Atlanta Flames**	80	35	33	12	262	237	82
New York Rangers	80	29	42	9	262	333	67

Note: GP = Games played, W = Wins, L = Losses, T = Ties, Pts = Points, GF = Goals for, GA = Goals against
Note: Teams that qualified for the playoffs are highlighted in bold.

=== Record vs. opponents ===
Patrick Division record vs. opponents

**Vs. Campbell Conference**

**Vs. Wales Conference**

**Vs. Patrick Division**

1975–76 NHL records
Team	**ATL**	**NYI**	**NYR**	**PHI**	**Total**
Atlanta	—	1–1–4	3–2–1	1–4–1	**5–7–6**
N.Y. Islanders	1–1–4	—	4–2	4–2	**9–5–4**
N.Y. Rangers	2–3–1	2–4	—	1–5	**5–12–1**
Philadelphia	4–1–1	2–4	5–1	—	**11–6–1**

**Vs. Smythe Division**

1975–76 NHL records
Team	**CHI**	**KCS**	**MIN**	**STL**	**VAN**	**Total**
Atlanta	2–2–1	5–0	4–1	1–3–1	3–0–2	**15–6–4**
N.Y. Islanders	3–1–1	2–0–3	4–1	4–0–1	0–3–2	**13–5–7**
N.Y. Rangers	2–0–3	4–1	4–1	3–2	3–1–1	**16–5–4**
Philadelphia	2–1–2	5–0	3–0–2	3–1–1	4–0–1	**17–2–6**

**Vs. Adams Division**

1975–76 NHL records
Team	**BOS**	**BUF**	**CAL**	**TOR**	**Total**
Atlanta	2–3	1–2–1	3–1	2–2	**8–8–1**
N.Y. Islanders	0–2–2	2–2	3–1	3–1–1	**8–6–3**
N.Y. Rangers	1–3	0–2–3	1–3	0–4	**2–12–3**
Philadelphia	1–2–1	3–0–1	4–0–1	3–0–1	**11–2–4**

**Vs. Norris Division**

1975–76 NHL records
Team	**DET**	**LAK**	**MTL**	**PIT**	**WSH**	**Total**
Atlanta	1–3	1–3	0–4	1–2–1	4–0	**7–12–1**
N.Y. Islanders	3–1	2–1–1	1–2–1	2–1–1	4–0	**12–5–3**
N.Y. Rangers	3–1	0–4	0–3–1	1–3	2–2	**6–13–1**
Philadelphia	2–2	2–0–2	2–1–1	3–0–1	3–0–1	**12–3–5**

== Schedule and results ==
1975–76 regular season
October

Game	Result	Date	Score	Opponent	Record
1	T	October 8, 1975	1–1	@ Kansas City Scouts (1975–76)	0–0–1
2	W	October 11, 1975	7–0	Los Angeles Kings (1975–76)	1–0–1
3	T	October 12, 1975	3–3	@ Boston Bruins (1975–76)	1–0–2
4	W	October 14, 1975	5–3	Montreal Canadiens (1975–76)	2–0–2
5	W	October 17, 1975	2–0	@ Atlanta Flames (1975–76)	3–0–2
6	L	October 18, 1975	2–5	Boston Bruins (1975–76)	3–1–2
7	T	October 21, 1975	5–5	Vancouver Canucks (1975–76)	3–1–3
8	W	October 23, 1975	3–0	Philadelphia Flyers (1975–76)	4–1–3
9	W	October 25, 1975	7–1	New York Rangers (1975–76)	5–1–3
10	T	October 27, 1975	4–4	@ Montreal Canadiens (1975–76)	5–1–4

November

Game	Result	Date	Score	Opponent	Record
11	W	November 1, 1975	7–3	Washington Capitals (1975–76)	6–1–4
12	W	November 4, 1975	5–3	California Golden Seals (1975–76)	7–1–4
13	L	November 5, 1975	6–7	@ Pittsburgh Penguins (1975–76)	7–2–4
14	W	November 8, 1975	4–3	@ Philadelphia Flyers (1975–76)	8–2–4
15	L	November 12, 1975	1–5	@ California Golden Seals (1975–76)	8–3–4
16	L	November 13, 1975	3–4	@ Los Angeles Kings (1975–76)	8–4–4
17	L	November 15, 1975	3–4	@ Vancouver Canucks (1975–76)	8–5–4
18	L	November 18, 1975	1–3	Buffalo Sabres (1975–76)	8–6–4
19	T	November 20, 1975	2–2	@ Boston Bruins (1975–76)	8–6–5
20	W	November 22, 1975	5–2	Kansas City Scouts (1975–76)	9–6–5
21	W	November 26, 1975	9–1	@ Minnesota North Stars (1975–76)	10–6–5
22	L	November 27, 1975	1–2	Montreal Canadiens (1975–76)	10–7–5
23	W	November 29, 1975	8–2	St. Louis Blues (1975–76)	11–7–5
24	L	November 30, 1975	2–3	@ Montreal Canadiens (1975–76)	11–8–5

December

Game	Result	Date	Score	Opponent	Record
25	W	December 2, 1975	4–1	@ St. Louis Blues (1975–76)	12–8–5
26	W	December 4, 1975	6–1	Pittsburgh Penguins (1975–76)	13–8–5
27	L	December 6, 1975	2–4	Buffalo Sabres (1975–76)	13–9–5
28	W	December 7, 1975	3–0	@ Buffalo Sabres (1975–76)	14–9–5
29	W	December 9, 1975	6–0	Minnesota North Stars (1975–76)	15–9–5
30	T	December 12, 1975	3–3	@ Atlanta Flames (1975–76)	15–9–6
31	W	December 13, 1975	5–3	@ Toronto Maple Leafs (1975–76)	16–9–6
32	W	December 17, 1975	3–0	@ New York Rangers (1975–76)	17–9–6
33	W	December 18, 1975	4–2	Toronto Maple Leafs (1975–76)	18–9–6
34	W	December 20, 1975	7–1	@ St. Louis Blues (1975–76)	19–9–6
35	L	December 21, 1975	2–5	@ Chicago Black Hawks (1975–76)	19–10–6
36	W	December 30, 1975	6–2	Philadelphia Flyers (1975–76)	20–10–6

January

Game	Result	Date	Score	Opponent	Record
37	T	January 3, 1976	1–1	Chicago Black Hawks (1975–76)	20–10–7
38	L	January 4, 1976	3–5	@ Philadelphia Flyers (1975–76)	20–11–7
39	W	January 6, 1976	8–1	Kansas City Scouts (1975–76)	21–11–7
40	L	January 8, 1976	3–5	Toronto Maple Leafs (1975–76)	21–12–7
41	W	January 13, 1976	1–0	Detroit Red Wings (1975–76)	22–12–7
42	T	January 17, 1976	2–2	Atlanta Flames (1975–76)	22–12–8
43	W	January 21, 1976	5–2	@ Washington Capitals (1975–76)	23–12–8
44	W	January 22, 1976	8–1	Detroit Red Wings (1975–76)	24–12–8
45	W	January 24, 1976	5–0	Los Angeles Kings (1975–76)	25–12–8
46	W	January 27, 1976	4–3	Minnesota North Stars (1975–76)	26–12–8
47	W	January 28, 1976	3–2	@ Toronto Maple Leafs (1975–76)	27–12–8
48	T	January 31, 1976	2–2	@ St. Louis Blues (1975–76)	27–12–9

February

Game	Result	Date	Score	Opponent	Record
49	T	February 3, 1976	2–2	Atlanta Flames (1975–76)	27–12–10
50	W	February 4, 1976	6–5	@ New York Rangers (1975–76)	28–12–10
51	L	February 6, 1976	3–4	@ Detroit Red Wings (1975–76)	28–13–10
52	L	February 8, 1976	2–4	@ Philadelphia Flyers (1975–76)	28–14–10
53	L	February 10, 1976	2–3	@ Vancouver Canucks (1975–76)	28–15–10
54	T	February 12, 1976	2–2	@ Kansas City Scouts (1975–76)	28–15–11
55	T	February 14, 1976	4–4	Pittsburgh Penguins (1975–76)	28–15–12
56	W	February 15, 1976	3–1	@ Buffalo Sabres (1975–76)	29–15–12
57	L	February 17, 1976	1–3	New York Rangers (1975–76)	29–16–12
58	W	February 18, 1976	5–3	@ Detroit Red Wings (1975–76)	30–16–12
59	L	February 21, 1976	1–2	Boston Bruins (1975–76)	30–17–12
60	W	February 22, 1976	4–0	@ Washington Capitals (1975–76)	31–17–12
61	W	February 24, 1976	7–2	@ Minnesota North Stars (1975–76)	32–17–12
62	T	February 26, 1976	2–2	Kansas City Scouts (1975–76)	32–17–13
63	W	February 28, 1976	4–1	Chicago Black Hawks (1975–76)	33–17–13

March

Game	Result	Date	Score	Opponent	Record
64	W	March 2, 1976	2–1	California Golden Seals (1975–76)	34–17–13
65	T	March 4, 1976	3–3	Vancouver Canucks (1975–76)	34–17–14
66	W	March 6, 1976	6–3	Washington Capitals (1975–76)	35–17–14
67	W	March 7, 1976	5–3	@ Pittsburgh Penguins (1975–76)	36–17–14
68	W	March 9, 1976	4–0	St. Louis Blues (1975–76)	37–17–14
69	T	March 13, 1976	2–2	@ Toronto Maple Leafs (1975–76)	37–17–15
70	W	March 14, 1976	5–3	@ Chicago Black Hawks (1975–76)	38–17–15
71	L	March 16, 1976	1–3	Minnesota North Stars (1975–76)	38–18–15
72	W	March 20, 1976	4–2	Chicago Black Hawks (1975–76)	39–18–15
73	L	March 23, 1976	2–5	@ Vancouver Canucks (1975–76)	39–19–15
74	T	March 24, 1976	1–1	@ Los Angeles Kings (1975–76)	39–19–16
75	W	March 26, 1976	3–2	@ California Golden Seals (1975–76)	40–19–16
76	W	March 29, 1976	5–1	Philadelphia Flyers (1975–76)	41–19–16
77	L	March 31, 1976	1–3	@ New York Rangers (1975–76)	41–20–16

April

Game	Result	Date	Score	Opponent	Record
78	T	April 1, 1976	1–1	Atlanta Flames (1975–76)	41–20–17
79	W	April 3, 1976	10–2	New York Rangers (1975–76)	42–20–17
80	L	April 4, 1976	2–5	@ Atlanta Flames (1975–76)	42–21–17

Legend: Win (2 points) Loss (0 points) Tie (1 point)

== Playoffs ==
The Islanders continued to show growth in the playoffs defeating the Vancouver Canucks in the preliminary round and the favored Buffalo Sabres in 6 games in the second round. The Islanders fell to the vastly superior Montreal Canadiens team that won 58 games that year and only lost one time in the entire playoffs. That one time was in Game 4 of the semi-finals, when they fell to the Islanders 5–2. The playoff run was generally viewed as a success since the Islanders had won 2 playoff series, and lost to the eventual champions. Additionally, the Isles still possessed a young core with players whom were still improving.

=== Round 1 vs. Vancouver ===
April 6	Vancouver Canucks	3–5	New York Islanders	Nassau Coliseum

April 8	New York Islanders	3–1	Vancouver Canucks	Pacific Coliseum

New York won series 2–0

=== Round 2 vs. Buffalo ===
April 11	New York Islanders	3–5	Buffalo Sabres	Buffalo Memorial Auditorium

April 13	New York Islanders	2–3	OT	Buffalo Sabres	Buffalo Memorial Auditorium

April 15	Buffalo Sabres	3–5	New York Islanders	Nassau Coliseum

April 17	Buffalo Sabres	2–4	New York Islanders	Nassau Coliseum

April 20	New York Islanders	4–3	Buffalo Sabres	Buffalo Memorial Auditorium

April 22	Buffalo Sabres	2–3	New York Islanders	Nassau Coliseum

New York won series 4–2

=== Round 3 vs. Montreal ===
April 27	New York Islanders	2–3	Montreal Canadiens	Montreal Forum

April 29	New York Islanders	3–4	Montreal Canadiens	Montreal Forum

May 1	Montreal Canadiens	3–2	New York Islanders	Nassau Coliseum

May 4	Montreal Canadiens	2–5	New York Islanders	Nassau Coliseum

May 6	New York Islanders	2–5	Montreal Canadiens	Montreal Forum

Montreal won series 4–1

== Player statistics ==
Regular season
Scoring

Player	Pos	GP	G	A	Pts	PIM	+/-	PPG	SHG	GWG
Denis Potvin	D	78	31	67	98	100	12	18	0	4
Bryan Trottier	C	80	32	63	95	21	28	11	1	5
Jean Potvin	D	78	17	55	72	74	16	9	1	2
Billy Harris	RW	80	32	38	70	54	22	16	0	4
Jude Drouin	C	76	21	41	62	58	18	10	0	2
Clark Gillies	LW	80	34	27	61	96	20	15	0	6
J.P. Parise	LW	80	22	35	57	80	12	5	2	4
Ed Westfall	D/RW	80	25	31	56	27	17	6	2	3
Bob Nystrom	RW	80	23	25	48	106	24	2	0	4
Garry Howatt	LW	80	21	13	34	197	26	0	0	2
Andre St. Laurent	C	67	9	17	26	56	14	0	0	2
Gerry Hart	D	80	6	18	24	151	35	0	0	0
Dave Lewis	D	73	0	19	19	54	29	0	0	0
Lorne Henning	C	80	7	10	17	16	6	0	4	0
Billy MacMillan	RW	64	9	7	16	10	5	0	0	2
Bert Marshall	D	71	0	16	16	72	37	0	0	0
Ralph Stewart	C	31	6	7	13	2	3	0	1	1
Bob Bourne	C	14	2	3	5	13	−2	0	0	1
Dave Fortier	D	59	0	2	2	68	9	0	0	0
Pat Price	D	4	0	2	2	2	4	0	0	0
Chico Resch	G	44	0	1	1	0	0	0	0	0
Billy Smith	G	39	0	1	1	10	0	0	0	0

Goaltending

Player	MIN	GP	W	L	T	GA	GAA	SO
Chico Resch	2546	44	23	11	8	88	2.07	7
Billy Smith	2254	39	19	10	9	98	2.61	3
Team:	4800	80	42	21	17	186	2.33	10

Playoffs
Scoring

Player	Pos	GP	G	A	Pts	PIM	PPG	SHG	GWG
Denis Potvin	D	13	5	14	19	32	2	0	1
Jude Drouin	C	13	6	9	15	0	1	0	1
Garry Howatt	LW	13	5	5	10	23	0	0	1
J.P. Parise	LW	13	4	6	10	10	1	0	0
Bob Nystrom	RW	13	3	6	9	30	1	0	0
Bryan Trottier	C	13	1	7	8	8	0	0	0
Billy Harris	RW	13	5	2	7	10	1	0	0
Billy MacMillan	RW	13	4	2	6	8	0	0	2
Clark Gillies	LW	13	2	4	6	16	0	0	1
Andre St. Laurent	C	13	1	5	6	15	0	0	0
Ed Westfall	D/RW	8	2	3	5	0	1	0	0
Gerry Hart	D	13	1	3	4	24	0	0	0
Bert Marshall	D	13	1	3	4	12	0	0	1
Lorne Henning	C	13	2	0	2	2	1	1	0
Ralph Stewart	C	6	1	1	2	0	1	0	0
Dave Lewis	D	13	0	1	1	44	0	0	0
Jean Potvin	D	13	0	1	1	2	0	0	0
Dave Fortier	D	6	0	0	0	0	0	0	0
Glenn Resch	G	7	0	0	0	0	0	0	0
Billy Smith	G	8	0	0	0	11	0	0	0

Goaltending

Player	MIN	GP	W	L	GA	GAA	SO
Billy Smith	437	8	4	3	21	2.88	0
Chico Resch	357	7	3	3	18	3.03	0
Team:	794	13	7	6	39	2.95	0

Note: Pos = Position; GP = Games played; G = Goals; A = Assists; Pts = Points; +/- = plus/minus; PIM = Penalty minutes; PPG = Power-play goals; SHG = Short-handed goals; GWG = Game-winning goals
MIN = Minutes played; W = Wins; L = Losses; T = Ties; GA = Goals-against; GAA = Goals-against average; SO = Shutouts;

== Draft picks ==
Below are the selections of the 1975 NHL amateur draft:

Pick #	Player	Position	Nationality	NHL team	College/junior/club team
11	Pat Price	Defence	Canada	New York Islanders	Vancouver Blazers (WHA)
29	Dave Salvian	Left wing	Canada	New York Islanders	St. Catharines Black Hawks (OMJHL)
47	Joe Fortunato	Left wing	Canada	New York Islanders	Kitchener Rangers (OMJHL)
65	Andre Lepage	Goaltender	Canada	New York Islanders	Montreal Bleu Blanc Rouge (QMJHL)
83	Denny McLean	Left wing	Canada	New York Islanders	Calgary Centennials (WCHL)
101	Mike Sleep	Right wing	Canada	New York Islanders	New Westminster Bruins (WCHL)
119	Richie Hansen	Centre	United States	New York Islanders	Sudbury Wolves (OMJHL)
137	Bob Sunderland	Defence	United States	New York Islanders	Boston University (ECAC)
153	Dan Blair	Right wing	Canada	New York Islanders	Ottawa 67's (OMJHL)
168	Joey Girardin	Defence	Canada	New York Islanders	Winnipeg Clubs (WCHL)
183	Geoff Green	Right wing	Canada	New York Islanders	Sudbury Wolves (OMJHL)
194	Kari Makkonen	Right wing	Finland	New York Islanders	Pori (Finland)
^{Reference: "1975 NHL Amateur Draft hockeydraftcentral.com".}

== See also ==
- 1975–76 NHL season
