= 1975–76 Buffalo Sabres season =

NHL hockey team season

1975–76 Buffalo Sabres
- Division: 2nd Adams
- Conference: 3rd Wales
- 1975–76 record: 46–21–13
- Home record: 28–7–5
- Road record: 21–16–3
- Goals for: 240
- Goals against: 105

Team information
- General manager: Punch Imlach
- Coach: Floyd Smith
- Captain: Jim Schoenfeld
- Alternate captains: None
- Arena: Buffalo Memorial Auditorium
- Average attendance: 16,433

Team leaders
- Goals: Danny Gare (50)
- Assists: Gilbert Perreault (69)
- Points: Gilbert Perreault (113)
- Penalty minutes: Danny Gare (129)
- Wins: Gerry Desjardins (29)
- Goals against average: Roger Crozier (2.61)

The 1975–76 Buffalo Sabres season was the Sabres' sixth season in the National Hockey League (NHL).

== Regular season ==
=== Final standings ===
Adams Division
	GP	W	L	T	GF	GA	Pts
**Boston Bruins**	80	48	15	17	313	237	113
**Buffalo Sabres**	80	46	21	13	339	240	105
**Toronto Maple Leafs**	80	34	31	15	294	276	83
California Golden Seals	80	27	42	11	250	278	65

Note: GP = Games played, W = Wins, L = Losses, T = Ties, Pts = Points, GF = Goals for, GA = Goals against
Note: Teams that qualified for the playoffs are highlighted in bold.

=== Record vs. opponents ===
Adams Division record vs. opponents

**Vs. Wales Conference**

**Vs. Campbell Conference**

**Vs. Adams Division**

1975–76 NHL records
Team	**BOS**	**BUF**	**CAL**	**TOR**	**Total**
Boston	—	3–2–1	5–1	4–1–1	**12–4–2**
Buffalo	2–3–1	—	5–0–1	4–2	**11–5–2**
California	1–5	0–5–1	—	1–3–2	**2–13–3**
Toronto	1–4–1	2–4	3–1–2	—	**6–9–3**

**Vs. Norris Division**

1975–76 NHL records
Team	**DET**	**LAK**	**MTL**	**PIT**	**WSH**	**Total**
Boston	3–0–2	4–1	0–3–2	3–0–2	4–0–1	**14–4–7**
Buffalo	4–1	3–2	2–3	4–1	4–0–1	**17–7–1**
California	3–1–1	2–3	0–5	2–2–1	3–1–1	**10–12–3**
Toronto	2–1–2	3–1–1	1–3–1	1–4	4–0–1	**11–9–5**

**Vs. Patrick Division**

1975–76 NHL records
Team	**ATL**	**NYI**	**NYR**	**PHI**	**Total**
Boston	3–2	2–0–2	3–1	2–1–1	**10–4–3**
Buffalo	2–1–1	2–2	2–0–3	0–3–1	**6–6–5**
California	1–3	1–3	3–1	0–4–1	**5–11–1**
Toronto	2–2	1–3–1	4–0	0–3–1	**7–8–2**

**Vs. Smythe Division**

1975–76 NHL records
Team	**CHI**	**KCS**	**MIN**	**STL**	**VAN**	**Total**
Boston	3–0–1	2–1–1	3–0–1	2–1–1	2–1–1	**12–3–5**
Buffalo	2–0–2	3–0–1	4–0	2–1–1	1–2–1	**12–3–5**
California	2–1–1	1–2–1	3–1	2–1–1	2–1–1	**10–6–4**
Toronto	1–2–1	3–0–1	3–1	2–0–2	1–2–1	**10–5–5**

== Schedule and results ==
1975–76 regular season
October

Game	Result	Date	Score	Opponent	Record
1	W	October 9, 1975	4–0	Detroit Red Wings (1975–76)	1–0–0
2	W	October 12, 1975	8–3	Toronto Maple Leafs (1975–76)	2–0–0
3	W	October 16, 1975	7–1	Chicago Black Hawks (1975–76)	3–0–0
4	W	October 18, 1975	5–3	@ St. Louis Blues (1975–76)	4–0–0
5	W	October 19, 1975	5–4	Washington Capitals (1975–76)	5–0–0
6	W	October 22, 1975	9–1	New York Rangers (1975–76)	6–0–0
7	W	October 25, 1975	5–3	@ Detroit Red Wings (1975–76)	7–0–0
8	W	October 26, 1975	3–2	California Golden Seals (1975–76)	8–0–0
9	L	October 29, 1975	2–3	@ Toronto Maple Leafs (1975–76)	8–1–0
10	T	October 30, 1975	4–4	Vancouver Canucks (1975–76)	8–1–1

November

Game	Result	Date	Score	Opponent	Record
11	W	November 2, 1975	7–2	Pittsburgh Penguins (1975–76)	9–1–1
12	L	November 3, 1975	2–3	@ Montreal Canadiens (1975–76)	9–2–1
13	W	November 5, 1975	4–0	Boston Bruins (1975–76)	10–2–1
14	W	November 9, 1975	5–1	Montreal Canadiens (1975–76)	11–2–1
15	L	November 12, 1975	1–3	Philadelphia Flyers (1975–76)	11–3–1
16	W	November 15, 1975	5–2	@ Pittsburgh Penguins (1975–76)	12–3–1
17	W	November 16, 1975	4–1	California Golden Seals (1975–76)	13–3–1
18	W	November 18, 1975	3–1	@ New York Islanders (1975–76)	14–3–1
19	W	November 20, 1975	7–2	Detroit Red Wings (1975–76)	15–3–1
20	W	November 23, 1975	6–2	Kansas City Scouts (1975–76)	16–3–1
21	L	November 25, 1975	0–4	@ Vancouver Canucks (1975–76)	16–4–1
22	W	November 28, 1975	4–2	@ California Golden Seals (1975–76)	17–4–1
23	L	November 29, 1975	3–8	@ Los Angeles Kings (1975–76)	17–5–1

December

Game	Result	Date	Score	Opponent	Record
24	T	December 3, 1975	4–4	@ Washington Capitals (1975–76)	17–5–2
25	T	December 4, 1975	6–6	New York Rangers (1975–76)	17–5–3
26	W	December 6, 1975	4–2	@ New York Islanders (1975–76)	18–5–3
27	L	December 7, 1975	0–3	New York Islanders (1975–76)	18–6–3
28	T	December 10, 1975	2–2	@ New York Rangers (1975–76)	18–6–4
29	L	December 14, 1975	4–7	Atlanta Flames (1975–76)	18–7–4
30	L	December 17, 1975	1–3	@ Detroit Red Wings (1975–76)	18–8–4
31	W	December 18, 1975	5–2	Minnesota North Stars (1975–76)	19–8–4
32	L	December 20, 1975	3–5	@ Boston Bruins (1975–76)	19–9–4
33	W	December 21, 1975	14–2	Washington Capitals (1975–76)	20–9–4
34	W	December 23, 1975	5–1	@ Kansas City Scouts (1975–76)	21–9–4
35	L	December 26, 1975	3–6	Boston Bruins (1975–76)	21–10–4
36	T	December 28, 1975	2–2	@ Chicago Black Hawks (1975–76)	21–10–5

January

Game	Result	Date	Score	Opponent	Record
37	L	January 1, 1976	6–9	Los Angeles Kings (1975–76)	21–11–5
38	W	January 5, 1976	4–2	@ Montreal Canadiens (1975–76)	22–11–5
39	W	January 8, 1976	8–5	Vancouver Canucks (1975–76)	23–11–5
40	W	January 11, 1976	6–0	Pittsburgh Penguins (1975–76)	24–11–5
41	L	January 13, 1976	3–7	@ St. Louis Blues (1975–76)	24–12–5
42	W	January 15, 1976	5–3	Washington Capitals (1975–76)	25–12–5
43	L	January 17, 1976	2–3	@ Pittsburgh Penguins (1975–76)	25–13–5
44	W	January 18, 1976	4–1	Minnesota North Stars (1975–76)	26–13–5
45	L	January 22, 1976	3–5	@ Boston Bruins (1975–76)	26–14–5
46	T	January 23, 1976	3–3	@ Atlanta Flames (1975–76)	26–14–6
47	W	January 25, 1976	4–2	St. Louis Blues (1975–76)	27–14–6
48	T	January 28, 1976	3–3	@ New York Rangers (1975–76)	27–14–7
49	T	January 29, 1976	1–1	Philadelphia Flyers (1975–76)	27–14–8

February

Game	Result	Date	Score	Opponent	Record
50	W	February 1, 1976	9–5	@ California Golden Seals (1975–76)	28–14–8
51	L	February 3, 1976	1–2	@ Vancouver Canucks (1975–76)	28–15–8
52	W	February 4, 1976	4–3	@ Los Angeles Kings (1975–76)	29–15–8
53	W	February 7, 1976	4–3	@ Minnesota North Stars (1975–76)	30–15–8
54	T	February 8, 1976	5–5	California Golden Seals (1975–76)	30–15–9
55	W	February 11, 1976	4–2	Detroit Red Wings (1975–76)	31–15–9
56	W	February 13, 1976	3–2	@ Atlanta Flames (1975–76)	32–15–9
57	L	February 15, 1976	1–3	New York Islanders (1975–76)	32–16–9
58	T	February 18, 1976	4–4	@ Chicago Black Hawks (1975–76)	32–16–10
59	W	February 19, 1976	3–1	Atlanta Flames (1975–76)	33–16–10
60	L	February 21, 1976	4–6	@ Toronto Maple Leafs (1975–76)	33–17–10
61	L	February 22, 1976	2–4	Montreal Canadiens (1975–76)	33–18–10
62	W	February 26, 1976	5–2	Toronto Maple Leafs (1975–76)	34–18–10
63	T	February 28, 1976	4–4	@ Kansas City Scouts (1975–76)	34–18–11
64	W	February 29, 1976	5–1	Los Angeles Kings (1975–76)	35–18–11

March

Game	Result	Date	Score	Opponent	Record
65	W	March 4, 1976	6–3	Chicago Black Hawks (1975–76)	36–18–11
66	L	March 6, 1976	2–3	@ Montreal Canadiens (1975–76)	36–19–11
67	T	March 7, 1976	4–4	St. Louis Blues (1975–76)	36–19–12
68	W	March 10, 1976	7–6	@ Pittsburgh Penguins (1975–76)	37–19–12
69	L	March 11, 1976	1–6	@ Philadelphia Flyers (1975–76)	37–20–12
70	W	March 14, 1976	8–2	@ Minnesota North Stars (1975–76)	38–20–12
71	W	March 16, 1976	4–2	@ Los Angeles Kings (1975–76)	39–20–12
72	W	March 17, 1976	5–3	@ California Golden Seals (1975–76)	40–20–12
73	W	March 21, 1976	3–1	Kansas City Scouts (1975–76)	41–20–12
74	W	March 24, 1976	7–3	New York Rangers (1975–76)	42–20–12
75	W	March 26, 1976	4–1	@ Washington Capitals (1975–76)	43–20–12
76	W	March 27, 1976	4–2	@ Toronto Maple Leafs (1975–76)	44–20–12
77	T	March 30, 1976	4–4	@ Boston Bruins (1975–76)	44–20–13

April

Game	Result	Date	Score	Opponent	Record
78	W	April 1, 1976	7–2	Boston Bruins (1975–76)	45–20–13
79	L	April 3, 1976	2–5	@ Philadelphia Flyers (1975–76)	45–21–13
80	W	April 4, 1976	5–2	Toronto Maple Leafs (1975–76)	46–21–13

Legend: Win (2 points) Loss (0 points) Tie (1 point)

== Playoffs ==
1976 Stanley Cup playoffs
Preliminary round vs. (8) St. Louis Blues – Sabres win 2–1

Game	Result	Date	Score	Opponent	Series
1	L	April 6, 1976	2–5	@ St. Louis Blues (1975–76)	0–1
2	W	April 8, 1976	3–2	St. Louis Blues (1975–76)	1–1
3	W	April 9, 1976	2–1	St. Louis Blues (1975–76)	2–1

Quarterfinals vs. (5) New York Islanders – Islanders win 4–2

Game	Result	Date	Score	Opponent	Series
1	W	April 11, 1976	5–3	New York Islanders (1975–76)	1–0
2	W	April 13, 1976	3–2 (OT)	New York Islanders (1975–76)	2–0
3	L	April 15, 1976	3–5	@ New York Islanders (1975–76)	2–1
4	L	April 17, 1976	2–4	@ New York Islanders (1975–76)	2–2
5	L	April 20, 1976	3–4	New York Islanders (1975–76)	2–3
6	L	April 22, 1976	2–3	@ New York Islanders (1975–76)	2–4

Legend: Win Loss

== Draft picks ==
Buffalo's draft picks at the 1975 NHL amateur draft held in Montreal.

Round	#	Player	Nationality	College/Junior/Club team (League)
1	17	Bob Sauve (G)	Canada	Laval National (QMJHL)
2	35	Ken Breitenbach (D)	Canada	St. Catharines Black Hawks (OMJHL)
3	44	Terry Martin (LW)	Canada	London Knights (OMJHL)
3	53	Gary McAdam (RW)	Canada	St. Catharines Black Hawks (OMJHL)
4	71	Greg Neeld (RW)	Canada	Calgary Centennials (WCHL)
5	89	Don Edwards (G)	Canada	Kitchener Rangers (OMJHL)
6	107	Jim Minor (LW)	Canada	Regina Pats (WCHL)
7	125	Grant Rowe (D)	Canada	Ottawa 67's (OMJHL)
8	143	Alec Tidey (RW)	Canada	Lethbridge Broncos (WCHL)
9	159	Andy Whitby (RW)	Canada	Oshawa Generals (OMJHL)
10	174	Len Moher (G)	United States	University of Notre Dame (WCHA)

== See also ==
- 1975–76 NHL season
