= 1975–76 Minnesota North Stars season =

National Hockey League team season

1975–76 Minnesota North Stars
- Division: 4th Smythe
- Conference: 8th Campbell
- 1975–76 record: 20–53–7
- Home record: 15–22–3
- Road record: 5–31–4
- Goals for: 195
- Goals against: 303

Team information
- General manager: Jack Gordon
- Coach: Ted Harris
- Captain: Bill Goldsworthy
- Alternate captains: None
- Arena: Met Center

Team leaders
- Goals: Bill Goldsworthy (24)
- Assists: Dennis Hextall (35)
- Points: Tim Young (51)
- Penalty minutes: Dennis O'Brien (187)
- Wins: Cesare Maniago (13)
- Goals against average: Cesare Maniago (3.35)

The 1975–76 Minnesota North Stars season was the North Stars' ninth season.

Coached by Ted Harris, the team compiled a record of 20–53–7 for 47 points, to finish the regular season 4th in the Smythe Division and failed to qualify for the playoffs.

== Regular season ==
=== Final standings ===
Smythe Division
	GP	W	L	T	GF	GA	Pts
**Chicago Black Hawks**	80	32	30	18	254	261	82
**Vancouver Canucks**	80	33	32	15	271	272	81
**St. Louis Blues**	80	29	37	14	249	290	72
Minnesota North Stars	80	20	53	7	195	303	47
Kansas City Scouts	80	12	56	12	190	351	36

Note: GP = Games played, W = Wins, L = Losses, T = Ties, Pts = Points, GF = Goals for, GA = Goals against
Note: Teams that qualified for the playoffs are highlighted in bold.

=== Record vs. opponents ===
Smythe Division record vs. opponents

**Vs. Campbell Conference**

**Vs. Wales Conference**

**Vs. Smythe Division**

1975–76 NHL records
Team	**CHI**	**KCS**	**MIN**	**STL**	**VAN**	**Total**
Chicago	—	5–0–1	5–1	3–2–1	4–1–1	**17–4–3**
Kansas City	0–5–1	—	0–6	1–3–2	2–4	**3–18–3**
Minnesota	1–5	6–0	—	2–4	1–5	**10–14–0**
St. Louis	2–3–1	3–1–2	4–2	—	3–2–1	**12–8–4**
Vancouver	1–4–1	4–2	5–1	2–3–1	—	**12–10–2**

**Vs. Patrick Division**

1975–76 NHL records
Team	**ATL**	**NYI**	**NYR**	**PHI**	**Total**
Chicago	2–2–1	1–3–1	0–2–3	1–2–2	**4–9–7**
Kansas City	0–5	0–2–3	1–4	0–5	**1–16–3**
Minnesota	1–4	1–4	1–4	0–3–2	**3–15–2**
St. Louis	3–1–1	0–4–1	2–3	1–3–1	**6–11–3**
Vancouver	0–3–2	3–0–2	1–3–1	0–4–1	**4–10–6**

**Vs. Adams Division**

1975–76 NHL records
Team	**BOS**	**BUF**	**CAL**	**TOR**	**Total**
Chicago	0–3–1	0–2–2	1–2–1	2–1–1	**3–8–5**
Kansas City	1–2–1	0–3–1	2–1–1	0–3–1	**3–9–4**
Minnesota	0–3–1	0–4	1–3	1–3	**2–13–1**
St. Louis	1–2–1	1–2–1	1–2–1	0–2–2	**3–8–5**
Vancouver	1–2–1	2–1–1	1–2–1	2–1–1	**6–6–4**

**Vs. Norris Division**

1975–76 NHL records
Team	**DET**	**LAK**	**MTL**	**PIT**	**WSH**	**Total**
Chicago	1–2–1	2–2	1–2–1	2–1–1	2–2	**8–9–3**
Kansas City	1–3	0–4	1–3	1–2–1	2–1–1	**5–13–2**
Minnesota	1–3	1–2–1	0–4	1–2–1	2–0–2	**5–11–4**
St. Louis	1–2–1	1–2–1	0–4	2–2	4–0	**8–10–2**
Vancouver	4–0	1–3	1–1–2	1–2–1	4–0	**11–6–3**

== Schedule and results ==
1975–76 regular season
October

Game	Result	Date	Score	Opponent	Record
1	L	October 8, 1975	2–3	Vancouver Canucks (1975–76)	0–1–0
2	L	October 11, 1975	5–9	Philadelphia Flyers (1975–76)	0–2–0
3	W	October 15, 1975	4–1	California Golden Seals (1975–76)	1–2–0
4	L	October 18, 1975	1–3	Chicago Black Hawks (1975–76)	1–3–0
5	L	October 19, 1975	2–3	@ Chicago Black Hawks (1975–76)	1–4–0
6	L	October 22, 1975	2–4	@ California Golden Seals (1975–76)	1–5–0
7	L	October 24, 1975	2–4	@ Vancouver Canucks (1975–76)	1–6–0
8	L	October 26, 1975	2–4	@ Los Angeles Kings (1975–76)	1–7–0
9	W	October 29, 1975	2–0	Kansas City Scouts (1975–76)	2–7–0

November

Game	Result	Date	Score	Opponent	Record
10	W	November 1, 1975	7–3	Pittsburgh Penguins (1975–76)	3–7–0
11	L	November 5, 1975	1–4	St. Louis Blues (1975–76)	3–8–0
12	L	November 7, 1975	2–3	@ Atlanta Flames (1975–76)	3–9–0
13	L	November 9, 1975	0–3	@ Chicago Black Hawks (1975–76)	3–10–0
14	L	November 11, 1975	0–6	@ Montreal Canadiens (1975–76)	3–11–0
15	L	November 13, 1975	0–6	@ Boston Bruins (1975–76)	3–12–0
16	L	November 15, 1975	2–5	New York Rangers (1975–76)	3–13–0
17	W	November 18, 1975	5–1	@ St. Louis Blues (1975–76)	4–13–0
18	L	November 19, 1975	0–6	Montreal Canadiens (1975–76)	4–14–0
19	L	November 22, 1975	3–6	Atlanta Flames (1975–76)	4–15–0
20	L	November 26, 1975	1–9	New York Islanders (1975–76)	4–16–0
21	W	November 29, 1975	5–3	Washington Capitals (1975–76)	5–16–0

December

Game	Result	Date	Score	Opponent	Record
22	W	December 3, 1975	3–1	Toronto Maple Leafs (1975–76)	6–16–0
23	W	December 6, 1975	4–0	Kansas City Scouts (1975–76)	7–16–0
24	L	December 7, 1975	1–6	@ Philadelphia Flyers (1975–76)	7–17–0
25	L	December 9, 1975	0–6	@ New York Islanders (1975–76)	7–18–0
26	W	December 11, 1975	5–3	@ Kansas City Scouts (1975–76)	8–18–0
27	W	December 13, 1975	2–1	Chicago Black Hawks (1975–76)	9–18–0
28	T	December 14, 1975	4–4	@ Washington Capitals (1975–76)	9–18–1
29	W	December 17, 1975	3–2	Atlanta Flames (1975–76)	10–18–1
30	L	December 18, 1975	2–5	@ Buffalo Sabres (1975–76)	10–19–1
31	W	December 20, 1975	5–3	Detroit Red Wings (1975–76)	11–19–1
32	L	December 21, 1975	0–2	@ New York Rangers (1975–76)	11–20–1
33	T	December 26, 1975	1–1	@ Washington Capitals (1975–76)	11–20–2
34	L	December 27, 1975	1–2	@ Montreal Canadiens (1975–76)	11–21–2
35	W	December 29, 1975	2–1	Los Angeles Kings (1975–76)	12–21–2
36	L	December 31, 1975	1–6	Boston Bruins (1975–76)	12–22–2

January

Game	Result	Date	Score	Opponent	Record
37	L	January 3, 1976	2–3	@ St. Louis Blues (1975–76)	12–23–2
38	L	January 7, 1976	1–2	Montreal Canadiens (1975–76)	12–24–2
39	L	January 8, 1976	0–5	@ Detroit Red Wings (1975–76)	12–25–2
40	W	January 10, 1976	2–0	St. Louis Blues (1975–76)	13–25–2
41	L	January 14, 1976	5–6	Toronto Maple Leafs (1975–76)	13–26–2
42	W	January 17, 1976	7–3	Washington Capitals (1975–76)	14–26–2
43	L	January 18, 1976	1–4	@ Buffalo Sabres (1975–76)	14–27–2
44	W	January 21, 1976	5–1	Vancouver Canucks (1975–76)	15–27–2
45	L	January 23, 1976	3–8	@ Vancouver Canucks (1975–76)	15–28–2
46	T	January 25, 1976	1–1	@ Pittsburgh Penguins (1975–76)	15–28–3
47	L	January 27, 1976	3–4	@ New York Islanders (1975–76)	15–29–3
48	W	January 28, 1976	9–3	Kansas City Scouts (1975–76)	16–29–3
49	T	January 31, 1976	3–3	Philadelphia Flyers (1975–76)	16–29–4

February

Game	Result	Date	Score	Opponent	Record
50	L	February 1, 1976	2–3	@ New York Rangers (1975–76)	16–30–4
51	L	February 4, 1976	0–5	@ Detroit Red Wings (1975–76)	16–31–4
52	L	February 7, 1976	3–4	Buffalo Sabres (1975–76)	16–32–4
53	L	February 8, 1976	1–4	@ Toronto Maple Leafs (1975–76)	16–33–4
54	L	February 11, 1976	2–5	Boston Bruins (1975–76)	16–34–4
55	L	February 14, 1976	2–3	Detroit Red Wings (1975–76)	16–35–4
56	L	February 15, 1976	3–7	California Golden Seals (1975–76)	16–36–4
57	L	February 17, 1976	1–2	@ Los Angeles Kings (1975–76)	16–37–4
58	L	February 18, 1976	3–6	@ California Golden Seals (1975–76)	16–38–4
59	L	February 20, 1976	0–7	@ Vancouver Canucks (1975–76)	16–39–4
60	W	February 22, 1976	6–3	@ Kansas City Scouts (1975–76)	17–39–4
61	L	February 24, 1976	2–7	New York Islanders (1975–76)	17–40–4
62	L	February 26, 1976	2–3	@ Philadelphia Flyers (1975–76)	17–41–4
63	W	February 28, 1976	5–3	New York Rangers (1975–76)	18–41–4

March

Game	Result	Date	Score	Opponent	Record
64	L	March 1, 1976	2–4	@ Toronto Maple Leafs (1975–76)	18–42–4
65	L	March 2, 1976	2–6	Pittsburgh Penguins (1975–76)	18–43–4
66	L	March 6, 1976	0–5	@ Pittsburgh Penguins (1975–76)	18–44–4
67	L	March 7, 1976	3–4	Vancouver Canucks (1975–76)	18–45–4
68	L	March 10, 1976	1–4	Atlanta Flames (1975–76)	18–46–4
69	L	March 13, 1976	1–4	Chicago Black Hawks (1975–76)	18–47–4
70	L	March 14, 1976	2–8	Buffalo Sabres (1975–76)	18–48–4
71	W	March 16, 1976	3–1	@ New York Islanders (1975–76)	19–48–4
72	L	March 17, 1976	1–3	@ New York Rangers (1975–76)	19–49–4
73	T	March 21, 1976	4–4	Los Angeles Kings (1975–76)	19–49–5
74	T	March 23, 1976	3–3	Philadelphia Flyers (1975–76)	19–49–6
75	W	March 24, 1976	4–1	@ Kansas City Scouts (1975–76)	20–49–6
76	L	March 27, 1976	3–6	@ St. Louis Blues (1975–76)	20–50–6
77	L	March 28, 1976	3–5	@ Chicago Black Hawks (1975–76)	20–51–6
78	L	March 30, 1976	3–5	St. Louis Blues (1975–76)	20–52–6

April

Game	Result	Date	Score	Opponent	Record
79	L	April 2, 1976	2–4	@ Atlanta Flames (1975–76)	20–53–6
80	T	April 4, 1976	2–2	@ Boston Bruins (1975–76)	20–53–7

Legend: Win (2 points) Loss (0 points) Tie (1 point)

== Draft picks ==
Minnesota's draft picks at the 1975 NHL amateur draft held in Montreal.

Round	#	Player	Nationality	College/Junior/Club team (League)
1	4	Bryan Maxwell	Canada	Medicine Hat Tigers (WCHL)
3	40	Paul Harrison	Canada	Oshawa Generals (OMJHL)
3	41	Alex Pirus	Canada	University of Notre Dame (WCHA)
4	58	Steve Jensen	United States	Michigan Tech University (WCHA)
5	76	Dave Norris	Canada	Hamilton Fincups (OMJHL)
6	94	Greg Clause	Canada	Hamilton Fincups (OMJHL)
7	112	Francois Robert	Canada	Sherbrooke Castors (QMJHL)
8	130	Dean Magee	Canada	Colorado College (WCHA)
9	147	Terry Angel	Canada	Oshawa Generals (OMJHL)
10	163	Michel Blais	Canada	Kingston Canadians (OMJHL)
11	177	Earl Sargent	United States	Fargo Sugar Kings (MWJHL)
12	190	Gilles Cloutier	Canada	Shawinigan Dynamos (QMJHL)

== See also ==
- 1975–76 NHL season
