= 1975–76 Vancouver Canucks season =

6th season in franchise history

1975–76 Vancouver Canucks
- Division: 2nd Smythe
- Conference: 5th Campbell
- 1975–76 record: 33–32–15
- Home record: 22–11–7
- Road record: 11–21–8
- Goals for: 271
- Goals against: 272

Team information
- General manager: Phil Maloney
- Coach: Phil Maloney
- Captain: Andre Boudrias
- Alternate captains: Dennis Ververgaert; Bob Dailey; Chris Oddleifson; Jocelyn Guevremont; Mike Robitaille
- Arena: Pacific Coliseum
- Average attendance: 15,798

Team leaders
- Goals: Dennis Ververgaert (37)
- Assists: Dennis Kearns; Chris Oddleifson (62)
- Points: Dennis Ververgaert (71)
- Penalty minutes: Harold Snepsts (125)
- Wins: Gary Smith (20)
- Goals against average: Ken Lockett (3.47)

The 1975–76 Vancouver Canucks season was the team's 6th in the NHL. The Canucks made the playoffs for the second seasons in a row, losing in the preliminary round to the New York Islanders. This was the last time until the 1991–92 season that the team would have a winning season.

== Regular season ==
=== Final standings ===
Smythe Division
	GP	W	L	T	GF	GA	Pts
**Chicago Black Hawks**	80	32	30	18	254	261	82
**Vancouver Canucks**	80	33	32	15	271	272	81
**St. Louis Blues**	80	29	37	14	249	290	72
Minnesota North Stars	80	20	53	7	195	303	47
Kansas City Scouts	80	12	56	12	190	351	36

Note: GP = Games played, W = Wins, L = Losses, T = Ties, Pts = Points, GF = Goals for, GA = Goals against
Note: Teams that qualified for the playoffs are highlighted in bold.

=== Record vs. opponents ===
Smythe Division record vs. opponents

**Vs. Campbell Conference**

**Vs. Wales Conference**

**Vs. Smythe Division**

1975–76 NHL records
Team	**CHI**	**KCS**	**MIN**	**STL**	**VAN**	**Total**
Chicago	—	5–0–1	5–1	3–2–1	4–1–1	**17–4–3**
Kansas City	0–5–1	—	0–6	1–3–2	2–4	**3–18–3**
Minnesota	1–5	6–0	—	2–4	1–5	**10–14–0**
St. Louis	2–3–1	3–1–2	4–2	—	3–2–1	**12–8–4**
Vancouver	1–4–1	4–2	5–1	2–3–1	—	**12–10–2**

**Vs. Patrick Division**

1975–76 NHL records
Team	**ATL**	**NYI**	**NYR**	**PHI**	**Total**
Chicago	2–2–1	1–3–1	0–2–3	1–2–2	**4–9–7**
Kansas City	0–5	0–2–3	1–4	0–5	**1–16–3**
Minnesota	1–4	1–4	1–4	0–3–2	**3–15–2**
St. Louis	3–1–1	0–4–1	2–3	1–3–1	**6–11–3**
Vancouver	0–3–2	3–0–2	1–3–1	0–4–1	**4–10–6**

**Vs. Adams Division**

1975–76 NHL records
Team	**BOS**	**BUF**	**CAL**	**TOR**	**Total**
Chicago	0–3–1	0–2–2	1–2–1	2–1–1	**3–8–5**
Kansas City	1–2–1	0–3–1	2–1–1	0–3–1	**3–9–4**
Minnesota	0–3–1	0–4	1–3	1–3	**2–13–1**
St. Louis	1–2–1	1–2–1	1–2–1	0–2–2	**3–8–5**
Vancouver	1–2–1	2–1–1	1–2–1	2–1–1	**6–6–4**

**Vs. Norris Division**

1975–76 NHL records
Team	**DET**	**LAK**	**MTL**	**PIT**	**WSH**	**Total**
Chicago	1–2–1	2–2	1–2–1	2–1–1	2–2	**8–9–3**
Kansas City	1–3	0–4	1–3	1–2–1	2–1–1	**5–13–2**
Minnesota	1–3	1–2–1	0–4	1–2–1	2–0–2	**5–11–4**
St. Louis	1–2–1	1–2–1	0–4	2–2	4–0	**8–10–2**
Vancouver	4–0	1–3	1–1–2	1–2–1	4–0	**11–6–3**

== Schedule and results ==
1975–76 regular season
October

Game	Result	Date	Score	Opponent	Record
1	W	October 8, 1975	3–2	@ Minnesota North Stars (1975–76)	1–0–0
2	L	October 11, 1975	2–4	@ Kansas City Scouts (1975–76)	1–1–0
3	L	October 12, 1975	0–3	@ Chicago Black Hawks (1975–76)	1–2–0
4	W	October 14, 1975	7–2	Washington Capitals (1975–76)	2–2–0
5	L	October 17, 1975	3–5	Los Angeles Kings (1975–76)	2–3–0
6	L	October 19, 1975	1–8	@ New York Rangers (1975–76)	2–4–0
7	T	October 21, 1975	5–5	@ New York Islanders (1975–76)	2–4–1
8	L	October 22, 1975	2–3	@ Toronto Maple Leafs (1975–76)	2–5–1
9	W	October 24, 1975	4–2	Minnesota North Stars (1975–76)	3–5–1
10	L	October 28, 1975	2–3	Atlanta Flames (1975–76)	3–6–1
11	T	October 30, 1975	4–4	@ Buffalo Sabres (1975–76)	3–6–2

November

Game	Result	Date	Score	Opponent	Record
12	T	November 1, 1975	3–3	@ St. Louis Blues (1975–76)	3–6–3
13	L	November 2, 1975	1–6	@ Chicago Black Hawks (1975–76)	3–7–3
14	L	November 4, 1975	2–4	New York Rangers (1975–76)	3–8–3
15	W	November 8, 1975	4–2	Boston Bruins (1975–76)	4–8–3
16	W	November 11, 1975	3–2	Toronto Maple Leafs (1975–76)	5–8–3
17	W	November 15, 1975	4–3	New York Islanders (1975–76)	6–8–3
18	T	November 18, 1975	2–2	@ Atlanta Flames (1975–76)	6–8–4
19	W	November 19, 1975	5–2	@ Washington Capitals (1975–76)	7–8–4
20	T	November 22, 1975	1–1	Chicago Black Hawks (1975–76)	7–8–5
21	W	November 25, 1975	4–0	Buffalo Sabres (1975–76)	8–8–5
22	L	November 26, 1975	1–2	@ California Golden Seals (1975–76)	8–9–5
23	L	November 29, 1975	4–6	@ Montreal Canadiens (1975–76)	8–10–5
24	L	November 30, 1975	3–5	@ Philadelphia Flyers (1975–76)	8–11–5

December

Game	Result	Date	Score	Opponent	Record
25	W	December 3, 1975	9–1	Detroit Red Wings (1975–76)	9–11–5
26	L	December 5, 1975	2–6	Atlanta Flames (1975–76)	9–12–5
27	W	December 9, 1975	5–3	St. Louis Blues (1975–76)	10–12–5
28	L	December 14, 1975	2–3	@ Boston Bruins (1975–76)	10–13–5
29	L	December 17, 1975	5–6	@ Kansas City Scouts (1975–76)	10–14–5
30	W	December 19, 1975	5–1	Pittsburgh Penguins (1975–76)	11–14–5
31	T	December 20, 1975	2–2	Montreal Canadiens (1975–76)	11–14–6
32	L	December 27, 1975	2–4	@ St. Louis Blues (1975–76)	11–15–6
33	W	December 28, 1975	3–2	@ Detroit Red Wings (1975–76)	12–15–6
34	W	December 30, 1975	5–2	Kansas City Scouts (1975–76)	13–15–6

January

Game	Result	Date	Score	Opponent	Record
35	T	January 2, 1976	4–4	Boston Bruins (1975–76)	13–15–7
36	W	January 4, 1976	4–3	@ Detroit Red Wings (1975–76)	14–15–7
37	W	January 6, 1976	5–3	@ Washington Capitals (1975–76)	15–15–7
38	L	January 8, 1976	5–8	@ Buffalo Sabres (1975–76)	15–16–7
39	T	January 10, 1976	3–3	@ Pittsburgh Penguins (1975–76)	15–16–8
40	L	January 11, 1976	2–5	@ Atlanta Flames (1975–76)	15–17–8
41	W	January 14, 1976	5–1	New York Rangers (1975–76)	16–17–8
42	L	January 16, 1976	1–2	Chicago Black Hawks (1975–76)	16–18–8
43	L	January 17, 1976	3–5	California Golden Seals (1975–76)	16–19–8
44	L	January 21, 1976	1–5	@ Minnesota North Stars (1975–76)	16–20–8
45	W	January 23, 1976	8–3	Minnesota North Stars (1975–76)	17–20–8
46	T	January 24, 1976	5–5	Toronto Maple Leafs (1975–76)	17–20–9
47	T	January 27, 1976	2–2	Montreal Canadiens (1975–76)	17–20–10
48	W	January 30, 1976	4–2	Washington Capitals (1975–76)	18–20–10

February

Game	Result	Date	Score	Opponent	Record
49	W	February 1, 1976	3–2	@ Chicago Black Hawks (1975–76)	19–20–10
50	W	February 3, 1976	2–1	Buffalo Sabres (1975–76)	20–20–10
51	L	February 5, 1976	1–6	@ Philadelphia Flyers (1975–76)	20–21–10
52	L	February 6, 1976	3–5	@ St. Louis Blues (1975–76)	20–22–10
53	L	February 8, 1976	3–7	Pittsburgh Penguins (1975–76)	20–23–10
54	W	February 10, 1976	3–2	New York Islanders (1975–76)	21–23–10
55	W	February 12, 1976	6–4	@ Montreal Canadiens (1975–76)	22–23–10
56	W	February 14, 1976	4–3	@ Toronto Maple Leafs (1975–76)	23–23–10
57	T	February 17, 1976	2–2	Philadelphia Flyers (1975–76)	23–23–11
58	L	February 18, 1976	4–6	Philadelphia Flyers (1975–76)	23–24–11
59	W	February 20, 1976	7–0	Minnesota North Stars (1975–76)	24–24–11
60	W	February 21, 1976	5–4	St. Louis Blues (1975–76)	25–24–11
61	L	February 24, 1976	1–4	Chicago Black Hawks (1975–76)	25–25–11
62	L	February 28, 1976	4–5	@ Pittsburgh Penguins (1975–76)	25–26–11
63	L	February 29, 1976	3–5	@ Boston Bruins (1975–76)	25–27–11

March

Game	Result	Date	Score	Opponent	Record
64	T	March 3, 1976	3–3	@ New York Rangers (1975–76)	25–27–12
65	T	March 4, 1976	3–3	@ New York Islanders (1975–76)	25–27–13
66	W	March 6, 1976	5–3	@ Kansas City Scouts (1975–76)	26–27–13
67	W	March 7, 1976	4–3	@ Minnesota North Stars (1975–76)	27–27–13
68	L	March 9, 1976	1–6	@ Los Angeles Kings (1975–76)	27–28–13
69	W	March 10, 1976	3–1	Kansas City Scouts (1975–76)	28–28–13
70	L	March 13, 1976	3–7	New York Rangers (1975–76)	28–29–13
71	W	March 16, 1976	4–2	Detroit Red Wings (1975–76)	29–29–13
72	L	March 18, 1976	2–3	@ Philadelphia Flyers (1975–76)	29–30–13
73	T	March 19, 1976	2–2	@ Atlanta Flames (1975–76)	29–30–14
74	L	March 21, 1976	2–5	St. Louis Blues (1975–76)	29–31–14
75	W	March 23, 1976	5–2	New York Islanders (1975–76)	30–31–14
76	W	March 26, 1976	4–3	Los Angeles Kings (1975–76)	31–31–14
77	L	March 27, 1976	3–7	@ Los Angeles Kings (1975–76)	31–32–14
78	T	March 30, 1976	4–4	California Golden Seals (1975–76)	31–32–15

April

Game	Result	Date	Score	Opponent	Record
79	W	April 2, 1976	5–0	@ California Golden Seals (1975–76)	32–32–15
80	W	April 4, 1976	5–2	Kansas City Scouts (1975–76)	33–32–15

Legend: Win (2 points) Loss (0 points) Tie (1 point)

== Awards and records ==
=== Trophies and awards ===
- Cyclone Taylor Award (Canucks MVP): Don Lever
- Cyrus H. McLean Trophy (Canucks Leading Scorer): Dennis Ververgaert
- Babe Pratt Trophy (Canucks Outstanding Defenceman): Dennis Kearns
- Fred J. Hume Award (Canucks Unsung Hero): Mike Robitaille
- Most Exciting Player: Bobby Lalonde
- Molson Cup (Most 3 Star Selections): Bobby Lalonde

== Draft picks ==
Vancouver's picks at the 1975 NHL amateur draft. The draft was held at the NHL Office in Montreal, Quebec.

Round	#	Player	Nationality	College/junior/club team (league)
1	10	Rick Blight (RW)	Canada	Brandon Wheat Kings (WCHL)
2	28	Brad Gassoff (LW)	Canada	Kamloops Chiefs (WCHL)
3	46	Norm LaPointe (G)	Canada	Trois-Rivières Draveurs (QMJHL)
4	64	Glen Richardson (LW)	Canada	Hamilton Fincups (OHA)
5	82	Doug Murray	Canada	Brandon Wheat Kings (WCHL)
6	100	Bob Watson	Canada	Flin Flon Bombers (WCHL)
7	118	Brian Shmyr (C)	Canada	New Westminster Bruins (WCHL)
8	136	Allan Fleck (LW)	Canada	New Westminster Bruins (WCHL)
9	152	Bob McNeice (LW)	Canada	New Westminster Bruins (WCHL)
11	182	Sid Veysey (C)	Canada	Sherbrooke Beavers (QMJHL)

== See also ==
- 1975–76 NHL season
