= Buster Harvey =

Canadian ice hockey player

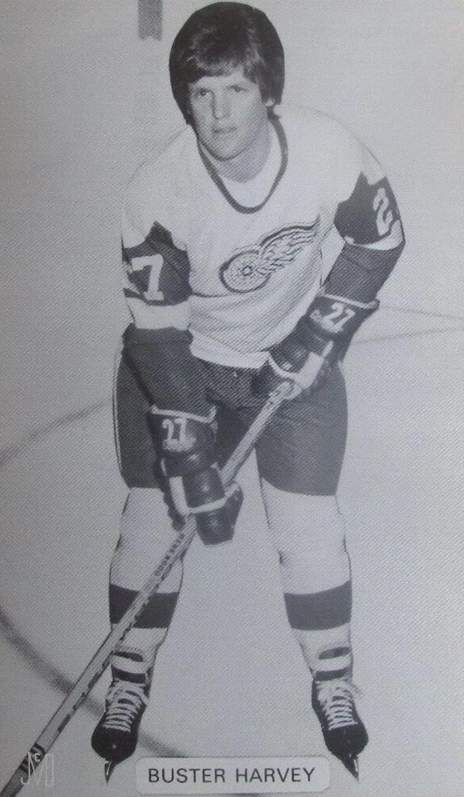
- Harvey in 1975 postcard
- Born: April 2, 1950 Fredericton, New Brunswick, Canada
- Died: November 25, 2007 (aged 57)
- Height: 5 ft 11 in (180 cm)
- Weight: 185 lb (84 kg; 13 st 3 lb)
- Position: Right wing
- Shot: Right
- Played for: Detroit Red Wings; Kansas City Scouts; Atlanta Flames; Minnesota North Stars
- NHL draft: 17th overall, 1970; Minnesota North Stars
- Playing career: 1970–1978

Frederick John Charles "Buster" Harvey (April 2, 1950 – November 25, 2007) was a Canadian ice hockey player who played 407 games in the National Hockey League for the Detroit Red Wings, Minnesota North Stars, Kansas City Scouts, and Atlanta Flames between 1970 and 1977.

== Playing career ==
A native of Fredericton, New Brunswick, Harvey moved to Ontario as a youth and played junior with the Hamilton Red Wings of the Ontario Hockey Association before being selected by the North Stars in the 1970 NHL Amateur Draft. Making his NHL debut that year, he played four seasons with the North Stars before being traded to Atlanta. Early into his second season with the Flames Harvey was traded to Kansas City, who subsequently traded him to Detroit, where Harvey spent the final part of his career, retiring in 1978 after one season in the minor American Hockey League. In 2007 Harvey died, eight months after being diagnosed with cancer. In his honour the Grant-Harvey Centre in Fredericton is named after him and longtime friend Danny Grant. Originally named after only Grant, he behest that Buster's name be added as well.

In memorial to Buster Harvey, a tournament is held every year in Fredericton, named the Annual Buster Harvey Memorial Peewee AAA hockey tournament. In 2013, Tayah Sommer, a female goaltender for the Peewee AAA Fredericton Caps, was the first female player, in the 6-year history of the tournament, to receive the tournament's "Unsung Hero" award. The award was presented by Mrs. Harvey at the newly opened Grant-Harvey Centre in Fredericton.

== Career statistics ==
=== Regular season and playoffs ===
			Regular season					Playoffs
Season	Team	League	GP	G	A	Pts	PIM	GP	G	A	Pts	PIM
1964–65	Fredericton Jr. Red Wings	NBAHA	14	17	21	38	—	3	1	1	2	8
1965–66	Fredericton Jr. Hawks	NBAHA	25	33	22	55	—	—	—	—	—	—
1966–67	Halifax Jr. Canadiens	MJrHL	51	23	51	74	50	17	9	18	27	10
1967–68	Fredericton Jr. Red Wings	NBJHL	4	2	4	6	2	6	2	4	6	16
1967–68	Fredericton Jr. Red Wings	SNBHL	6	2	8	10	34	5	0	7	7	11
1968–69	Hamilton Red Wings	OHA	49	23	28	51	30	5	2	3	5	6
1969–70	Hamilton Red Wings	OHA	54	26	34	60	39	—	—	—	—	—
1970–71	Minnesota North Stars	NHL	59	12	8	20	36	7	0	0	0	4
1971–72	Cleveland Barons	AHL	73	41	54	95	72	6	1	2	3	34
1971–72	Minnesota North Stars	NHL	—	—	—	—	—	1	0	0	0	0
1972–73	Minnesota North Stars	NHL	68	21	34	55	16	6	0	2	2	4
1973–74	Minnesota North Stars	NHL	72	16	17	33	14	—	—	—	—	—
1974–75	Atlanta Flames	NHL	79	17	27	44	16	—	—	—	—	—
1975–76	Atlanta Flames	NHL	1	0	0	0	0	—	—	—	—	—
1975–76	Kansas City Scouts	NHL	39	5	12	17	6	—	—	—	—	—
1975–76	Detroit Red Wings	NHL	35	8	9	17	25	—	—	—	—	—
1976–77	Kansas City Blues	CHL	15	4	12	16	4	10	1	3	4	2
1976–77	Detroit Red Wings	NHL	54	11	11	22	18	—	—	—	—	—
1977–78	Philadelphia Firebirds	AHL	71	10	17	27	31	4	1	0	1	2
NHL totals			407	90	118	208	131	14	0	2	2	8
