= Bert Wilson (ice hockey) =

Canadian ice hockey player

- Born: October 17, 1949 Orangeville, Ontario, Canada
- Died: February 28, 1992 (aged 42)
- Height: 6 ft 0 in (183 cm)
- Weight: 180 lb (82 kg; 12 st 12 lb)
- Position: Left wing
- Shot: Left
- Played for: New York Rangers; St. Louis Blues; Los Angeles Kings; Calgary Flames
- NHL draft: 23rd overall, 1969; New York Rangers
- Playing career: 1969–1983

Bertwin Hilliard "Belting Bert" Wilson (October 17, 1949 – February 28, 1992) was a Canadian professional ice hockey player who played 478 games in the National Hockey League with the New York Rangers, St. Louis Blues, Los Angeles Kings, and Calgary Flames between 1974 and 1981.

He died on February 28, 1992, of stomach cancer at the age of 42.

== Career statistics ==
=== Regular season and playoffs ===
			Regular season					Playoffs
Season	Team	League	GP	G	A	Pts	PIM	GP	G	A	Pts	PIM
1967–68	London Nationals	WOHL	45	8	3	11	94	3	1	0	1	2
1968–69	London Knights	OHA	54	13	19	32	160	6	2	2	4	7
1969–70	Omaha Knights	CHL	32	7	6	13	103	12	3	2	5	15
1969–70	Buffalo Bisons	AHL	—	—	—	—	—	1	0	0	0	0
1970–71	Omaha Knights	CHL	69	13	15	28	164	11	0	4	4	29
1971–72	Providence Reds	AHL	59	11	12	23	105	5	0	2	2	16
1972–73	Providence Reds	AHL	72	15	24	39	131	4	2	0	2	15
1973–74	New York Rangers	NHL	5	1	1	2	2	—	—	—	—	—
1973–74	Providence Reds	AHL	72	24	31	55	200	15	5	6	11	22
1974–75	New York Rangers	NHL	61	5	1	6	66	—	—	—	—	—
1975–76	St. Louis Blues	NHL	45	2	3	5	47	—	—	—	—	—
1975–76	Los Angeles Kings	NHL	13	0	0	0	17	8	0	0	0	24
1976–77	Los Angeles Kings	NHL	77	4	3	7	64	8	0	2	2	12
1977–78	Los Angeles Kings	NHL	79	7	16	23	127	2	0	0	0	2
1978–79	Los Angeles Kings	NHL	73	9	10	19	138	—	—	—	—	—
1979–80	Los Angeles Kings	NHL	75	4	3	7	91	2	0	0	0	4
1980–81	Calgary Flames	NHL	50	5	7	12	94	1	0	0	0	0
1981–82	Salt Lake Golden Eagles	CHL	52	6	23	29	124	10	3	2	5	30
1982–83	Salt Lake Golden Eagles	CHL	69	11	13	24	114	6	1	2	3	2
NHL totals			478	37	44	81	646	21	0	2	2	42
