= 1975–76 Chicago Black Hawks season =

National Hockey League team season

1975–76 Chicago Black Hawks
- Smythe Division champions
- Division: 1st Smythe
- Conference: 4th Campbell
- 1975–76 record: 32–30–18
- Home record: 17–15–8
- Road record: 15–15–10
- Goals for: 254
- Goals against: 261

Team information
- General manager: Tommy Ivan
- Coach: Billy Reay
- Captain: Pit Martin and Stan Mikita
- Alternate captains: None
- Arena: Chicago Stadium

Team leaders
- Goals: Pit Martin (32)
- Assists: Dale Tallon (47)
- Points: Pit Martin (71)
- Penalty minutes: Phil Russell (194)
- Plus/minus: Keith Magnuson (+13)
- Wins: Tony Esposito (30)
- Goals against average: Tony Esposito (2.97)

The 1975–76 Chicago Black Hawks season was the Hawks' 50th season in the NHL. During the previous season, the club had a 37–35–8 record, earning 82 points, and finished in third place in the Smythe Division. Then, the Black Hawks upset the heavily favored Boston Bruins in the NHL preliminary series before losing to the Buffalo Sabres in the NHL quarterfinals.

Pit Martin and Stan Mikita were named co-captains for the season. The team had played without a captain, since 1969–70.

Chicago started off the 1975–76 regular season with a 10–4–11 record in their first 25 games and took the lead in the Smythe Division. The Hawks had a 15-game unbeaten streak (6–0–9) during that span. The team reached a peak of being ten games over .500 with a record of 21–11–16 through 48 games. Chicago then fell into a slump and found themselves under .500 with only four games left in the season, falling to 29–30–17. The club went unbeaten in their last four games (3–0–1) to finish the year with a 32–30–18 record, earning 82 points, which was enough to finish in first place in the Smythe Division. The Hawks 32 wins was their lowest toal since 1967–68, when they also won 32 games.

Offensively, the Black Hawks were led by Pit Martin, who had a club high 32 goals and 71 points. Dennis Hull rebounded from a poor 1974–75 season to score 27 goals and 66 points. Ivan Boldirev scored 28 goals and 62 points. Defenseman Dale Tallon led the club with 47 assists, while scoring 15 goals for 62 points. Stan Mikita missed 32 games due to injuries; however, he still earned 57 points. Keith Magnuson had a team high +13 rating, and Phil Russell led the club with 194 penalty minutes.

In goal, Tony Esposito once again led the club with 30 victories and a 2.97 GAA, earning four shutouts in 68 games.

Since the Hawks won their division, they were given a bye in the NHL preliminary series, and they faced the powerful Montreal Canadiens in the NHL quarter-finals. The Canadiens had a record breaking season in 1975–76 with 58 wins and 127 points and finished in first place in the Norris Division. The Black Hawks—Canadiens series opened with two games at the Montreal Forum. The Canadiens quickly took control of the series, shutting out Chicago 4–0 in the series opener, and then winning 3–1 in the second game. The series continued at Chicago Stadium for the next two games, where the Canadiens took the third game by a 2–1 score, and then swept the Hawks out of the playoffs with a 4–1 victory in the fourth game.

== Season standings ==
=== Final standings ===
Smythe Division
	GP	W	L	T	GF	GA	Pts
**Chicago Black Hawks**	80	32	30	18	254	261	82
**Vancouver Canucks**	80	33	32	15	271	272	81
**St. Louis Blues**	80	29	37	14	249	290	72
Minnesota North Stars	80	20	53	7	195	303	47
Kansas City Scouts	80	12	56	12	190	351	36

Note: GP = Games played, W = Wins, L = Losses, T = Ties, Pts = Points, GF = Goals for, GA = Goals against
Note: Teams that qualified for the playoffs are highlighted in bold.

=== Record vs. opponents ===
Smythe Division record vs. opponents

**Vs. Campbell Conference**

**Vs. Wales Conference**

**Vs. Smythe Division**

1975–76 NHL records
Team	**CHI**	**KCS**	**MIN**	**STL**	**VAN**	**Total**
Chicago	—	5–0–1	5–1	3–2–1	4–1–1	**17–4–3**
Kansas City	0–5–1	—	0–6	1–3–2	2–4	**3–18–3**
Minnesota	1–5	6–0	—	2–4	1–5	**10–14–0**
St. Louis	2–3–1	3–1–2	4–2	—	3–2–1	**12–8–4**
Vancouver	1–4–1	4–2	5–1	2–3–1	—	**12–10–2**

**Vs. Patrick Division**

1975–76 NHL records
Team	**ATL**	**NYI**	**NYR**	**PHI**	**Total**
Chicago	2–2–1	1–3–1	0–2–3	1–2–2	**4–9–7**
Kansas City	0–5	0–2–3	1–4	0–5	**1–16–3**
Minnesota	1–4	1–4	1–4	0–3–2	**3–15–2**
St. Louis	3–1–1	0–4–1	2–3	1–3–1	**6–11–3**
Vancouver	0–3–2	3–0–2	1–3–1	0–4–1	**4–10–6**

**Vs. Adams Division**

1975–76 NHL records
Team	**BOS**	**BUF**	**CAL**	**TOR**	**Total**
Chicago	0–3–1	0–2–2	1–2–1	2–1–1	**3–8–5**
Kansas City	1–2–1	0–3–1	2–1–1	0–3–1	**3–9–4**
Minnesota	0–3–1	0–4	1–3	1–3	**2–13–1**
St. Louis	1–2–1	1–2–1	1–2–1	0–2–2	**3–8–5**
Vancouver	1–2–1	2–1–1	1–2–1	2–1–1	**6–6–4**

**Vs. Norris Division**

1975–76 NHL records
Team	**DET**	**LAK**	**MTL**	**PIT**	**WSH**	**Total**
Chicago	1–2–1	2–2	1–2–1	2–1–1	2–2	**8–9–3**
Kansas City	1–3	0–4	1–3	1–2–1	2–1–1	**5–13–2**
Minnesota	1–3	1–2–1	0–4	1–2–1	2–0–2	**5–11–4**
St. Louis	1–2–1	1–2–1	0–4	2–2	4–0	**8–10–2**
Vancouver	4–0	1–3	1–1–2	1–2–1	4–0	**11–6–3**

== Schedule and results ==
=== Regular season ===
1975–76 regular season
October

Game	Date	Visitor	Score	Home	Record	Points
1	October 8	Chicago Black Hawks	2–2	New York Rangers	0–0–1	1
2	October 11	Chicago Black Hawks	1–2	Toronto Maple Leafs	0–1–1	1
3	October 12	Vancouver Canucks	0–3	Chicago Black Hawks	1–1–1	3
4	October 15	Detroit Red Wings	4–4	Chicago Black Hawks	1–1–2	4
5	October 16	Chicago Black Hawks	1–7	Buffalo Sabres	1–2–2	4
6	October 18	Chicago Black Hawks	3–1	Minnesota North Stars	2–2–2	6
7	October 19	Minnesota North Stars	2–3	Chicago Black Hawks	3–2–2	8
8	October 22	Los Angeles Kings	5–3	Chicago Black Hawks	3–3–2	8
9	October 25	Chicago Black Hawks	4–0	Kansas City Scouts	4–3–2	10
10	October 26	Washington Capitals	7–5	Chicago Black Hawks	4–4–2	10
11	October 29	Montreal Canadiens	1–2	Chicago Black Hawks	5–4–2	12

November

Game	Date	Visitor	Score	Home	Record	Points
12	November 1	Chicago Black Hawks	3–1	Detroit Red Wings	6–4–2	14
13	November 2	Vancouver Canucks	1–6	Chicago Black Hawks	7–4–2	16
14	November 5	Philadelphia Flyers	4–4	Chicago Black Hawks	7–4–3	17
15	November 8	Chicago Black Hawks	7–5	Pittsburgh Penguins	8–4–3	19
16	November 9	Minnesota North Stars	0–3	Chicago Black Hawks	9–4–3	21
17	November 12	Chicago Black Hawks	4–4	New York Rangers	9–4–4	22
18	November 13	Chicago Black Hawks	5–5	Philadelphia Flyers	9–4–5	23
19	November 15	Chicago Black Hawks	4–4	Montreal Canadiens	9–4–6	24
20	November 19	Chicago Black Hawks	4–2	Los Angeles Kings	10–4–6	26
21	November 22	Chicago Black Hawks	1–1	Vancouver Canucks	10–4–7	27
22	November 26	Toronto Maple Leafs	4–4	Chicago Black Hawks	10–4–8	28
23	November 29	Boston Bruins	4–4	Chicago Black Hawks	10–4–9	29
24	November 30	Kansas City Scouts	1–1	Chicago Black Hawks	10–4–10	30

December

Game	Date	Visitor	Score	Home	Record	Points
25	December 3	Pittsburgh Penguins	3–3	Chicago Black Hawks	10–4–11	31
26	December 4	Chicago Black Hawks	2–5	Philadelphia Flyers	10–5–11	31
27	December 7	Atlanta Flames	2–0	Chicago Black Hawks	10–6–11	31
28	December 10	Chicago Black Hawks	7–2	Washington Capitals	11–6–11	33
29	December 13	Chicago Black Hawks	1–2	Minnesota North Stars	11–7–11	33
30	December 14	St. Louis Blues	4–3	Chicago Black Hawks	11–8–11	33
31	December 17	Philadelphia Flyers	4–2	Chicago Black Hawks	11–9–11	33
32	December 19	Chicago Black Hawks	2–5	California Golden Seals	11–10–11	33
33	December 21	New York Islanders	2–5	Chicago Black Hawks	12–10–11	35
34	December 23	St. Louis Blues	1–4	Chicago Black Hawks	13–10–11	37
35	December 27	Chicago Black Hawks	4–1	Toronto Maple Leafs	14–10–11	39
36	December 28	Buffalo Sabres	2–2	Chicago Black Hawks	14–10–12	40
37	December 30	California Golden Seals	3–5	Chicago Black Hawks	15–10–12	42

January

Game	Date	Visitor	Score	Home	Record	Points
38	January 3	Chicago Black Hawks	1–1	New York Islanders	15–10–13	43
39	January 4	Pittsburgh Penguins	3–5	Chicago Black Hawks	16–10–13	45
40	January 9	Chicago Black Hawks	1–1	Atlanta Flames	16–10–14	46
41	January 11	New York Rangers	6–2	Chicago Black Hawks	16–11–14	46
42	January 14	Chicago Black Hawks	2–2	California Golden Seals	16–11–15	47
43	January 16	Chicago Black Hawks	2–1	Vancouver Canucks	17–11–15	49
44	January 18	Philadelphia Flyers	0–2	Chicago Black Hawks	18–11–15	51
45	January 21	Chicago Black Hawks	3–3	New York Rangers	18–11–16	52
46	January 24	Chicago Black Hawks	2–1	St. Louis Blues	19–11–16	54
47	January 25	Kansas City Scouts	1–3	Chicago Black Hawks	20–11–16	56
48	January 28	Atlanta Flames	3–7	Chicago Black Hawks	21–11–16	58
49	January 29	Chicago Black Hawks	3–5	Boston Bruins	21–12–16	58
50	January 31	Chicago Black Hawks	1–2	Detroit Red Wings	21–13–16	58

February

Game	Date	Visitor	Score	Home	Record	Points
51	February 1	Vancouver Canucks	3–2	Chicago Black Hawks	21–14–16	58
52	February 4	Chicago Black Hawks	3–8	Montreal Canadiens	21–15–16	58
53	February 6	Chicago Black Hawks	2–1	Atlanta Flames	22–15–16	60
54	February 8	Washington Capitals	2–4	Chicago Black Hawks	23–15–16	62
55	February 11	Los Angeles Kings	7–4	Chicago Black Hawks	23–16–16	62
56	February 14	Chicago Black Hawks	5–4	Kansas City Scouts	24–16–16	64
57	February 15	Boston Bruins	4–1	Chicago Black Hawks	24–17–16	64
58	February 18	Buffalo Sabres	4–4	Chicago Black Hawks	24–17–17	65
59	February 21	Chicago Black Hawks	1–10	Pittsburgh Penguins	24–18–17	65
60	February 22	California Golden Seals	5–2	Chicago Black Hawks	24–19–17	65
61	February 24	Chicago Black Hawks	4–1	Vancouver Canucks	25–19–17	67
62	February 26	Chicago Black Hawks	6–2	Los Angeles Kings	26–19–17	69
63	February 28	Chicago Black Hawks	1–4	New York Islanders	26–20–17	69
64	February 29	Chicago Black Hawks	1–4	Washington Capitals	26–21–17	69

March

Game	Date	Visitor	Score	Home	Record	Points
65	March 4	Chicago Black Hawks	4–6	Buffalo Sabres	26–22–17	69
66	March 6	Chicago Black Hawks	4–7	St. Louis Blues	26–23–17	69
67	March 10	Montreal Canadiens	5–1	Chicago Black Hawks	26–24–17	69
68	March 13	Chicago Black Hawks	4–1	Minnesota North Stars	27–24–17	71
69	March 14	New York Islanders	5–3	Chicago Black Hawks	27–25–17	71
70	March 16	Chicago Black Hawks	6–3	Kansas City Scouts	28–25–17	73
71	March 17	Toronto Maple Leafs	5–6	Chicago Black Hawks	29–25–17	75
72	March 20	Chicago Black Hawks	2–4	New York Islanders	29–26–17	75
73	March 21	Detroit Red Wings	6–0	Chicago Black Hawks	29–27–17	75
74	March 24	Atlanta Flames	7–2	Chicago Black Hawks	29–28–17	75
75	March 25	Chicago Black Hawks	2–4	Boston Bruins	29–29–17	75
76	March 27	New York Rangers	6–5	Chicago Black Hawks	29–30–17	75
77	March 28	Minnesota North Stars	3–5	Chicago Black Hawks	30–30–17	77
78	March 31	Kansas City Scouts	3–6	Chicago Black Hawks	31–30–17	79

April

Game	Date	Visitor	Score	Home	Record	Points
79	April 3	Chicago Black Hawks	3–3	St. Louis Blues	31–30–18	80
80	April 4	St. Louis Blues	2–7	Chicago Black Hawks	32–30–18	82

Legend: Win (2 points) Loss (0 points) Tie (1 point)

=== Playoffs ===
1976 Stanley Cup playoffs
Quarterfinals vs. (1) Montreal Canadiens – Canadiens win 4–0

Game	Date	Visitor	Score	Home	Series
1	April 11	Chicago Black Hawks	0–4	Montreal Canadiens	0–1
2	April 13	Chicago Black Hawks	1–3	Montreal Canadiens	0–2
3	April 15	Montreal Canadiens	2–1	Chicago Black Hawks	0–3
4	April 18	Montreal Canadiens	4–1	Chicago Black Hawks	0–4

Legend: Win Loss

== Season stats ==
=== Scoring leaders ===
Player	GP	G	A	Pts	PIM
Pit Martin	80	32	39	71	44
Dennis Hull	80	29	39	68	28
Ivan Boldirev	78	28	34	62	33
Dale Tallon	80	15	47	62	101
Cliff Koroll	80	25	33	58	29

=== Goaltending ===
Player	GP	TOI	W	L	T	GA	SO	GAA
Tony Esposito	68	4003	30	23	13	198	4	2.97
Gilles Villemure	15	797	2	7	5	57	0	4.29

== Playoff stats ==
=== Scoring leaders ===
Player	GP	G	A	Pts	PIM
Dick Redmond	4	0	2	2	4
Darcy Rota	4	1	0	1	2
Pit Martin	4	1	0	1	4
Cliff Koroll	4	1	0	1	0
Phil Russell	4	0	1	1	17

=== Goaltending ===
Player	GP	TOI	W	L	GA	SO	GAA
Tony Esposito	4	240	0	4	13	0	3.25

== Awards, records and honors ==
- Stan Mikita, Lester Patrick Trophy

== Draft picks ==
Chicago's draft picks during the 1975 NHL amateur draft at the NHL Office in Montreal.

Round	#	Player	Nationality	College/Junior/Club team (League)
1	7	Greg Vaydik	Canada	Medicine Hat Tigers (WCHL)
2	25	Danny Arndt	Canada	Saskatoon Blades (WCHL)
3	43	Mike O'Connell	United States	Kingston Canadians (OHA)
4	61	Pierre Giroux	Canada	Hull Festivals (QMJHL)
5	79	Bob Hoffmeyer	Canada	Saskatoon Blades (WCHL)
6	97	Tom Ulseth	United States	University of Wisconsin (NCAA)
7	115	Ted Bulley	Canada	Hull Festivals (QMJHL)
8	141	Paul Jensen	United States	Michigan Tech (NCAA)

== Sources ==
- Hockey-Reference
- Rauzulu's Street
- Goalies Archive
- HockeyDB
- National Hockey League Guide & Record Book 2007
