= 1975–76 NHL transactions =

The following is a list of all team-to-team transactions that have occurred in the National Hockey League during the 1975–76 NHL season. It lists what team each player has been traded to, signed by, or claimed by, and for which player(s) or draft pick(s), if applicable.

== Trades between teams ==
=== June ===
June 1, 1975	To California Golden Seals Jim Pappin; 3rd-rd pick - 1977 Amateur Draft (CLE - # 42 - Guy Lash)^{1}	To Chicago Black Hawks Joey Johnston
June 3, 1975	To Washington Capitals Bill Clement; Don McLean; 1st-rd pick - 1975 Amateur Draft (# 18 - Alex Forsyth)	To Philadelphia Flyers 1st-rd pick - 1975 Amateur Draft (# 1 - Mel Bridgman)
June 3, 1975	To Toronto Maple Leafs 3rd-rd pick - 1976 Amateur Draft (# 52 - Gary McFayden)	To Boston Bruins 4th-rd pick - 1975 Amateur Draft (# 60 - Rick Adduono)
June 3, 1975	To Toronto Maple Leafs 10th-rd pick - 1975 Amateur Draft (# 166 - Paul Crowley)	To Chicago Black Hawks cash
June 3, 1975	To Detroit Red Wings 11th-rd pick - 1975 Amateur Draft (# 176 - Dave Hanson)	To Washington Capitals cash
June 3, 1975	To Toronto Maple Leafs 11th-rd pick - 1975 Amateur Draft (# 180 - Jack Laine)	To Chicago Black Hawks cash
June 3, 1975	To Toronto Maple Leafs 12th-rd pick - 1975 Amateur Draft (# 188 - Ken Holland)	To Washington Capitals cash
June 3, 1975	To Toronto Maple Leafs 12th-rd pick - 1975 Amateur Draft (# 189 - Bob Barnes)	To Kansas City Scouts cash
June 3, 1975	To Toronto Maple Leafs 12th-rd pick - 1975 Amateur Draft (# 193 - Jim Montgomery)	To St. Louis Blues cash
June 3, 1975	To St. Louis Blues cash	To New York Rangers 13th-rd pick - 1975 Amateur Draft (# 200 - Steve Roberts)
June 5, 1975	To Atlanta Flames Dave Kryskow	To Detroit Red Wings Bryan Hextall Jr.
June 17, 1975	To Toronto Maple Leafs Wayne Thomas	To Montreal Canadiens 1st-rd pick - 1976 Amateur Draft (# 12 - Peter Lee)
June 18, 1975	To Kansas City Scouts Denis Dupere; Craig Patrick cash	To St. Louis Blues Lynn Powis; 2nd-rd pick - 1976 Amateur Draft (# 20 - Brian Sutter)
June 18, 1975	To St. Louis Blues Jerry Butler; Ted Irvine; Bert Wilson	To New York Rangers Bill collins John Davidson
June 20, 1975	To Toronto Maple Leafs Stan Weir	To California Golden Seals Gary Sabourin
June 23, 1975	To Los Angeles Kings Bart Crashley; Marcel Dionne	To Detroit Red Wings Terry Harper; Dan Maloney; 2nd-rd pick - 1976 Amateur Draft (MIN - # 31 - Jim Roberts)^{1}
June 26, 1975	To Toronto Maple Leafs Greg Hubick	To Montreal Canadiens Doug Jarvis

1. The Golden Seals relocated to become the Cleveland Barons for the 1976–77 NHL season.
2. Detroit's second-round pick went to Minnesota as the result of a trade on February 27, 1976 that sent Dennis Hextall to Detroit in exchange for Bill Hogaboam and this pick.

=== July ===
July 3, 1975	To Buffalo Sabres cash	To St. Louis Blues rights to Gilles Gratton
July 9, 1975	To Montreal Canadiens 3rd-rd pick - 1977 Amateur Draft (# 43 - Alain Cote) cash	To Minnesota North Stars Glen Sather

=== August ===
August 15, 1975	To Minnesota North Stars Tim Young	To Los Angeles Kings 2nd-rd pick - 1976 Amateur Draft (# 21 - Steve Clippingdale)
August 22, 1975	To Kansas City Scouts Gary Bergman; Bill McKenzie	To Detroit Red Wings Glen Burdon; Peter McDuffe

=== September ===
September, 1975 exact date unknown	To Toronto Maple Leafs Tom Cassidy	To Los Angeles Kings cash
September 9, 1975	To Atlanta Flames Curt Ridley	To New York Rangers Jerry Byers
September 20, 1975	To St. Louis Blues Bob MacMillan	To New York Rangers Larry Sacharuk
September 23, 1975	To California Golden Seals cash	To Atlanta Flames Claude St. Sauveur

=== October ===
October 1, 1975	To Buffalo Sabres cash	To Kansas City Scouts Rocky Farr
October 1, 1975	To Buffalo Sabres Jacques Richard	To Atlanta Flames Larry Carriere; 1st-rd pick - 1976 Amateur Draft (WSH - # 15 - Greg Carroll)^{1} cash
October 13, 1975	To Kansas City Scouts Buster Harvey	To Atlanta Flames Richard Lemieux; 2nd-rd pick - 1977 Amateur Draft (# 20 - Miles Zaharko)
October 22, 1975	To California Golden Seals cash	To St. Louis Blues Rick Smith
October 28, 1975	To Chicago Black Hawks Gilles Villemure	To New York Rangers Doug Jarrett
October 30, 1975	To St. Louis Blues Derek Sanderson	To New York Rangers 1st-rd pick - 1977 Amateur Draft (# 8 - Lucien DeBlois)

1. Buffalo's first-round pick went to Washington as the result of a trade on January 22, 1976 that sent Bill Clement to Atlanta in exchange for Jean Lemieux, Gerry Meehan and this pick.

=== November ===
November, 1975 exact dte unknown	To Kansas City Scouts Frank Bathe	To Detroit Red Wings Hank Lehvonen
November 7, 1975	To Boston Bruins Brad Park; Jean Ratelle; Joe Zanussi	To New York Rangers Phil Esposito; Carol Vadnais
November 14, 1975	To Boston Bruins cash	To New York Rangers Al Simmons
November 20, 1975	To Detroit Red Wings rights to Jean-Paul LeBlanc	To Chicago Black Hawks 2nd-rd pick - 1977 Amateur Draft (# 19 - Jean Savard)
November 21, 1975	To Minnesota North Stars Bryan Hextall Jr.	To Detroit Red Wings Rick Chinnick
November 24, 1975	To California Golden Seals Wayne Merrick	To St. Louis Blues Larry Patey; 3rd-rd pick - 1977 Amateur Draft (CLE - # 41 - Reg Kerr)^{1}
November 25, 1975	To Minnesota North Stars Pierre Jarry	To Detroit Red Wings Don Martineau
November 26, 1975	To Washington Capitals Bob Paradise	To Pittsburgh Penguins 2nd-rd pick - 1976 Amateur Draft (# 19 - Greg Malone)

1. Cleveland's third-round pick was re-acquired as the result of a trade on March 9, 1976 that sent Dave Hrechkosy to St. Louis in exchange for a fifth-round pick in 1976 and this pick. The Golden Seals relocated to become the Cleveland Barons for the 1976–77 NHL season.

=== December ===
December 9, 1975	To Kansas City Scouts rights to Henry Boucha	To Minnesota North Stars 2nd-rd pick - 1978 Amateur Draft (# 24 - Steve Christoff)
December 15, 1975	To Washington Capitals Bob Sirois	To Philadelphia Flyers future considerations^{1} (John Paddock)
December 16, 1975	To Washington Capitals Harvey Bennett Jr.	To Pittsburgh Penguins Stan Gilbertson

1. Trade completed on September 1, 1976.

=== January ===
January 9, 1976	To Kansas City Scouts Chuck Arnason; Steve Durbano; 1st-rd pick - 1976 Amateur Draft (# 11 - Paul Gardner)	To Pittsburgh Penguins Ed Gilbert; Simon Nolet; 1st-rd pick - 1976 Amateur Draft (# 2 - Blair Chapman)
January 14, 1976	To Kansas City Scouts Phil Roberto	To Detroit Red Wings Buster Harvey
January 14, 1976	To Los Angeles Kings Ab DeMarco Jr.	To Vancouver Canucks 2nd-rd pick - 1977 Amateur Draft (ATL - # 31 - Brian Hill)^{1}
January 20, 1976	To Vancouver Canucks Curt Ridley	To Atlanta Flames 1st-rd pick - 1976 Amateur Draft (# 8 - David Shand)
January 22, 1976	To Atlanta Flames Bill Clement	To Washington Capitals Jean Lemieux; Gerry Meehan; 1st-rd pick - 1976 Amateur Draft (# 15 - Greg Carroll)

1. Vancouver's second-round pick went to Atlanta as the result of a trade on December 2, 1976 that sent Larry Carriere and Hilliard Graves to Vancouver in exchange for John Gould and this pick.

=== February ===
February 27, 1976	To Minnesota North Stars Bill Hogaboam; 2nd-rd pick - 1976 Amateur Draft (# 31 - Jim Roberts)	To Detroit Red Wings Dennis Hextall

=== March ===
March 6, 1976	To Los Angeles Kings Bert Wilson rights to Curt Brackenbury	To St. Louis Blues cash
March 8, 1976	To Pittsburgh Penguins Bobby Taylor; Ed Van Impe	To Philadelphia Flyers Gary Inness future considerations^{1} (8th-rd pick 1977 Amateur Draft - # 135 - Pete Peeters) (9th-rd pick 1977 Amateur Draft - # 150 - Tom Bauer) (10th-rd pick 1977 Amateur Draft - # 128 - Rob Nicholson) (11th-rd pick 1977 Amateur Draft - # 165 - Jim Trainor) (12th-rd pick 1977 Amateur Draft - # 172 - Mike Laycock)
March 9, 1976	To St. Louis Blues Doug Grant	To Detroit Red Wings future considerations^{2} (Rick Wilson)
March 9, 1976	To California Golden Seals 5th-rd pick 1976 Amateur Draft (# 79 - Cal Sandbeck); 3rd-rd pick 1977 Amateur Draft (CLE - # 41 - Reg Kerr)^{3}	To St. Louis Blues Dave Hrechkosy

1. Trade completed on June 14, 1977 at the 1977 NHL Amateur Draft.
2. Trade completed on June 16, 1976.
3. The Golden Seals relocated to become the Cleveland Barons for the 1976–77 NHL season.

== Additional sources ==
- hockeydb.com - search for player and select "show trades"
- "NHL trades for 1975-1976". NHL Trade Tracker.
