= 1975–76 NHL season =

National Hockey League season

- League: National Hockey League
- Sport: Ice hockey
- Duration: October 7, 1975 – May 16, 1976
- Games: 80
- Teams: 18
- TV partner(s): CBC, CTV, SRC (Canada); NHL Network, CBS (Note: CBS only televised the January 4 Super Series '76 game.) (United States)

Draft
- Top draft pick: Mel Bridgman
- Picked by: Philadelphia Flyers

Regular season
- Season champions: Montreal Canadiens
- Season MVP: Bobby Clarke (Flyers)
- Top scorer: Guy Lafleur (Canadiens)

Playoffs
- Playoffs MVP: Reggie Leach (Flyers)

Stanley Cup
- Champions: Montreal Canadiens
- Runners-up: Philadelphia Flyers

NHL seasons
- 1974–75 1976–77

The 1975–76 NHL season was the 59th season of the National Hockey League. The Montreal Canadiens won the Stanley Cup, defeating the two-time defending champion Philadelphia Flyers in the final.

== Amateur draft ==
The 1975 NHL amateur draft was held on June 3, at the NHL offices in Montreal, Quebec. Mel Bridgman was selected first overall by the Philadelphia Flyers.

== Regular season ==
The Montreal Canadiens set records in wins with 58 and points with 127, beginning a four-year stretch where they would dominate the league in the regular season and win four straight Stanley Cup titles. The Philadelphia Flyers tied the record set by the 1929–30 Boston Bruins for most consecutive home ice wins, with 20.

During the regular season, between December 28 and January 10, "Super Series '76" took place as two teams from the Soviet Championship League played eight exhibitions against NHL teams. HC CSKA Moscow (the "Red Army Club"), defending Soviet champion, played against the New York Rangers, Montreal, Boston and, on January 11, the defending NHL champion, the Philadelphia Flyers, while Krylya Sovetov Moscow ("the Soviet Wings") played against Pittsburgh, Buffalo, Chicago and the New York Islanders.

The New York Rangers got off to their worst start since 1965–66. Under pressure, general manager Emile Francis traded Derek Sanderson to St. Louis and put goaltender Eddie Giacomin on waivers. Detroit claimed him, and then the blockbuster trade of the year saw the Boston Bruins send superstar center Phil Esposito and star defenceman Carol Vadnais to the New York Rangers for star center Jean Ratelle and superstar defenceman Brad Park.

Both Ratelle and Park would excel for the Bruins for years to come, while Esposito's days as the preeminent scorer in the NHL were behind him. Trades did not help the Rangers, as they gave up 333 goals against (3rd worst in the NHL) and finished last in the Patrick Division, which cost Emile Francis his job as general manager, and coach Ron Stewart was fired as well. John Ferguson Sr. took over both jobs.

The Kansas City Scouts established a dubious distinction, winning only one of their final 44 games.

On February 7, 1976, Darryl Sittler set an NHL record that still stands for most points scored in one game. He recorded ten points (six goals, four assists) against the Boston Bruins.

=== Final standings ===
Note: GP = Games played, W = Wins, L = Losses, T = Ties, Pts = Points, GF = Goals for, GA = Goals against, PIM = Penalties in minutes
Note: Teams that qualified for the playoffs are highlighted in bold

==== Prince of Wales Conference ====
Adams Division
	GP	W	L	T	GF	GA	Pts
**Boston Bruins**	80	48	15	17	313	237	113
**Buffalo Sabres**	80	46	21	13	339	240	105
**Toronto Maple Leafs**	80	34	31	15	294	276	83
California Golden Seals	80	27	42	11	250	278	65

Norris Division
	GP	W	L	T	GF	GA	Pts
**Montreal Canadiens**	80	58	11	11	337	174	127
**Los Angeles Kings**	80	38	33	9	263	265	85
**Pittsburgh Penguins**	80	35	33	12	339	303	82
Detroit Red Wings	80	26	44	10	226	300	62
Washington Capitals	80	11	59	10	224	394	32

==== Clarence Campbell Conference ====
Patrick Division
	GP	W	L	T	GF	GA	Pts
**Philadelphia Flyers**	80	51	13	16	348	209	118
**New York Islanders**	80	42	21	17	297	190	101
**Atlanta Flames**	80	35	33	12	262	237	82
New York Rangers	80	29	42	9	262	333	67

Smythe Division
	GP	W	L	T	GF	GA	Pts
**Chicago Black Hawks**	80	32	30	18	254	261	82
**Vancouver Canucks**	80	33	32	15	271	272	81
**St. Louis Blues**	80	29	37	14	249	290	72
Minnesota North Stars	80	20	53	7	195	303	47
Kansas City Scouts	80	12	56	12	190	351	36

== Playoffs ==
=== Playoff seeds ===
The top three teams in each division made the playoffs. All 12 clubs then were seeded 1–12 based on regular season points, regardless of conference or division.

Note: Only teams that qualified for the playoffs are listed here.

1. Montreal Canadiens, Norris Division champions, Prince of Wales Conference regular season champions – 127 points
2. Philadelphia Flyers, Patrick Division champions, Clarence Campbell Conference regular season champions – 118 points
3. Boston Bruins, Adams Division champions – 113 points
4. Buffalo Sabres – 105 points
5. New York Islanders – 101 points
6. Los Angeles Kings – 85 points
7. Toronto Maple Leafs – 83 points
8. Pittsburgh Penguins – 82 points (35 wins, 5 points head-to-head vs. Atlanta)
9. Atlanta Flames – 82 points (35 wins, 3 points head-to-head vs. Pittsburgh)
10. Chicago Black Hawks, Smythe Division champions – 82 points (32 wins)
11. Vancouver Canucks – 81 points
12. St. Louis Blues – 72 points

=== Playoff bracket ===
The NHL used "re-seeding" instead of a fixed bracket playoff system: in each round, the highest remaining seed was matched against the lowest remaining seed, the second-highest remaining seed played the second-lowest remaining seed, and so forth.

Regardless of playoff seed, all four division winners received a bye to the Quarterfinals, including this season's 10th overall seeded Smythe Division champion Chicago Black Hawks.

Each series in the Preliminary Round was played in a best-of-three format while each series in the other three rounds were played in a best-of-seven format (scores in the bracket indicate the number of games won in each series).

Preliminary round
1	Buffalo	2
8	St. Louis	1
2	NY Islanders	2
7	Vancouver	0
4	Toronto	2
5	Pittsburgh	1
3	Los Angeles	2
6	Atlanta	0

Quarterfinals
1	Montreal	4
8	Chicago	0
4	Buffalo	2
5	NY Islanders	4
2	Philadelphia	4
7	Toronto	3
3	Boston	4
6	Los Angeles	3

Semifinals
1	Montreal	4
4	NY Islanders	1
2	Philadelphia	4
3	Boston	1

Stanley Cup Finals
1	Montreal	4
2	Philadelphia	0

=== Preliminary round ===
==== (1) Buffalo Sabres vs. (8) St. Louis Blues ====
The Buffalo Sabres were the first seed of the preliminary round and fourth overall with 105 points. The St. Louis Blues were the eighth seed of the preliminary round and twelfth overall with 72 points. This was the first playoff series between these two teams. The Buffalo Sabres won this year's regular season series earning 5 of 8 points.

April 6	Buffalo Sabres	2–5	St. Louis Blues	St. Louis Arena	Recap
No scoring		First period	04:14 – pp – Derek Sanderson (1); 08:28 – sh – Chuck Lefley (1); 19:42 – pp – Larry Patey (1)
No scoring		Second period	No scoring
Rick Martin (1) – 08:37; Jacques Richard (1) – 18:11		Third period	01:56 – Garry Unger (1); 15:31 – Chuck Lefley (2)
Gerry Desjardins 25 saves / 29 shots Al Smith 1 save / 2 shots		Goalie stats	Ed Staniowski 37 saves / 39 shots

April 8	St. Louis Blues	2–3	OT	Buffalo Sabres	Buffalo Memorial Auditorium	Recap
No scoring		First period		No scoring
No scoring		Second period		No scoring
Garry Unger (2) – 02:01; Dave Hrechkosy (1) – 18:02		Third period		07:35 – sh – Craig Ramsay (1); 11:24 – Danny Gare (1)
No scoring		First overtime period		11:43 – Danny Gare (2)
Ed Staniowski 54 saves / 57 shots		Goalie stats		Gerry Desjardins 14 saves / 16 shots

April 9	St. Louis Blues	1–2	OT	Buffalo Sabres	Buffalo Memorial Auditorium	Recap
No scoring		First period		19:05 – Gilbert Perreault (1)
Red Berenson (1) – 09:10		Second period		No scoring
No scoring		Third period		No scoring
No scoring		First overtime period		14:27 – Don Luce (1)
Ed Staniowski 32 saves / 34 shots		Goalie stats		Gerry Desjardins 21 saves / 22 shots

Buffalo won series 2–1

==== (2) New York Islanders vs. (7) Vancouver Canucks ====
The New York Islanders were the second seed in the preliminary round and fifth overall with 101 points. The Vancouver Canucks were the seventh seed in the preliminary round and eleventh overall with 81 points. This was the first playoff series between these two teams. Vancouver won this year's regular season series earning 8 of 10 points.

April 6	Vancouver Canucks	3–5	New York Islanders	Nassau Coliseum	Recap
Dennis Ververgaert (1) – pp – 02:58; John Gould (1) – sh – 08:18		First period	06:01 – Gerry Hart (1); 08:28 – pp – Billy Harris (1)
No scoring		Second period	00:10 – sh – Lorne Henning (1); 05:36 – Bill MacMillan (1); 08:20 – Bob Nystrom (1)
Bob Dailey (1) – pp – 04:27		Third period	No scoring
Curt Ridley 25 saves / 30 shots		Goalie stats	Chico Resch 29 saves / 32 shots

April 8	New York Islanders	3–1	Vancouver Canucks	Pacific Coliseum	Recap
J.P. Parise (1) – 03:13		First period	No scoring
No scoring		Second period	07:49 – Chris Oddleifson (1)
Garry Howatt (1) – 11:39; Clark Gillies (1) – 12:11		Third period	No scoring
Chico Resch 29 saves / 30 shots		Goalie stats	Curt Ridley 31 saves / 34 shots

New York won series 2–0

==== (3) Los Angeles Kings vs. (6) Atlanta Flames ====
The Los Angeles Kings were the third seed of the preliminary round and sixth overall 85 points. The Atlanta Flames were the sixth seed of the preliminary round and ninth overall with 82 points, losing the tie-breaker to Pittsburgh in head-to-head points (5 to 3). This was the first playoff meeting between these two teams. Los Angeles won this year's regular season series earning 6 of 8 points.

April 6	Atlanta Flames	1–2	Los Angeles Kings	The Forum	Recap
No scoring		First period	00:50 – Tom Williams (1)
No scoring		Second period	02:40 – Bob Nevin (1)
Barry Gibbs (1) – 14:36		Third period	No scoring
Dan Bouchard 24 saves / 26 shots		Goalie stats	Rogie Vachon 19 saves / 20 shots

April 8	Los Angeles Kings	1–0	Atlanta Flames	Omni Coliseum	Recap
No scoring		First period	No scoring
No scoring		Second period	No scoring
Bob Berry (1) – 18:16		Third period	No scoring
Rogie Vachon 27 saves / 27 shots		Goalie stats	Dan Bouchard 25 saves / 26 shots

Los Angeles won series 2–0

==== (4) Toronto Maple Leafs vs. (5) Pittsburgh Penguins ====
The Toronto Maple Leafs were the fourth seed in the preliminary round and seventh overall with 83 points. The Pittsburgh Penguins were the fifth seed in the preliminary round and eighth overall with 82 points, winning the tiebreaker over Atlanta in head-to-head points (5 to 3). This was the first playoff series between these two teams. Pittsburgh won this year's regular season series earning 8 of 10 points.

April 6	Pittsburgh Penguins	1–4	Toronto Maple Leafs	Maple Leaf Gardens	Recap
No scoring		First period	13:01 – pp – Jim McKenny (1)
No scoring		Second period	04:44 – Lanny McDonald (1); 11:00 – Bob Neely (1)
Stan Gilbertson (1) – 04:17		Third period	15:02 – George Ferguson (1)
Michel Plasse 32 saves / 36 shots		Goalie stats	Wayne Thomas 35 saves / 36 shots

April 8	Toronto Maple Leafs	0–2	Pittsburgh Penguins	Civic Arena	Recap
No scoring		First period	No scoring
No scoring		Second period	11:25 – pp – Lowell MacDonald (1)
No scoring		Third period	19:21 – en – Vic Hadfield (1)
Wayne Thomas 47 saves / 48 shots		Goalie stats	Michel Plasse 21 saves / 21 shots

April 9	Pittsburgh Penguins	0–4	Toronto Maple Leafs	Maple Leaf Gardens	Recap
No scoring		First period	17:01 – Jim McKenny (2)
No scoring		Second period	02:03 – Pat Boutette (1); 09:14 – pp – Borje Salming (1)
No scoring		Third period	02:14 – Lanny McDonald (2)
Michel Plasse 32 saves / 36 shots		Goalie stats	Wayne Thomas 26 saves / 26 shots

Toronto won series 2–1

=== Quarterfinals ===
==== (1) Montreal Canadiens vs. (8) Chicago Black Hawks ====
The Montreal Canadiens finished first in the league with 127 points. The Chicago Black Hawks finished as the Smythe Division Champions as the eighth and lowest-remaining seed in the playoffs with 82 points. This was the 17th playoff series between these two teams. Montreal leads 11–5 in previous meetings. Their most recent meeting came in the 1973 Stanley Cup Finals, which Montreal won in six games. Montreal won this year's regular season series earning 5 of 8 points.

April 11	Chicago Blackhawks	0–4	Montreal Canadiens	Montreal Forum	Recap
No scoring		First period	04:22 – Larry Robinson (1); 08:30 – Peter Mahovlich (1)
No scoring		Second period	16:41 – Doug Jarvis (1)
No scoring		Third period	12:50 – Jimmy Roberts (1)
Tony Esposito 33 saves / 37 shots		Goalie stats	Ken Dryden 22 saves / 22 shots

April 13	Chicago Blackhawks	1–3	Montreal Canadiens	Montreal Forum	Recap
Darcy Rota (1) – pp – 03:55		First period	No scoring
No scoring		Second period	14:51 – pp – Yvan Cournoyer (1); 15:05 – pp – Jacques Lemaire (1)
No scoring		Third period	00:12 – Guy Lafleur (1)
Tony Esposito 26 saves / 29 shots		Goalie stats	Ken Dryden 21 saves / 22 shots

April 15	Montreal Canadiens	2–1	Chicago Blackhawks	Chicago Stadium	Recap
No scoring		First period	No scoring
Yvon Lambert (1) – 05:21		Second period	No scoring
Guy Lafleur (2) – 19:47		Third period	17:49 – Pit Martin (1)
Ken Dryden 30 saves / 31 shots		Goalie stats	Tony Esposito 37 saves / 39 shots

April 18	Montreal Canadiens	4–1	Chicago Blackhawks	Chicago Stadium	Recap
Serge Savard (1) – sh – 19:05		First period	10:31 – pp – Cliff Koroll (1)
Peter Mahovlich (2) – pp – 02:40		Second period	No scoring
Guy Lafleur (3) – 09:56; Doug Jarvis (2) – 14:52		Third period	No scoring
Ken Dryden 34 saves / 35 shots		Goalie stats	Tony Esposito 22 saves 26 shots

Montreal won series 4–0

==== (2) Philadelphia Flyers vs. (7) Toronto Maple Leafs ====
The Philadelphia Flyers finished as Clarence Campbell Conference regular season champions and second seed overall with 118 points. This was the second playoff series meeting between these two teams. This was a rematch of last year's Stanley Cup Quarterfinals, which Philadelphia won in a four-game sweep. Philadelphia won this year's regular season series earning 7 of 8 points.

April 12	Toronto Maple Leafs	1–4	Philadelphia Flyers	Spectrum	Recap
Lanny McDonald (3) – pp – 12:11		First period	08:01 – Reggie Leach (1); 13:59 – pp – Orest Kindrachuk (1)
No scoring		Second period	06:55 – Bobby Clarke (1)
No scoring		Third period	11:31 – pp – Gary Dornhoefer (1)
Wayne Thomas 40 saves / 44 shots		Goalie stats	Bernie Parent 23 saves / 24 shots

April 13	Toronto Maple Leafs	1–3	Philadelphia Flyers	Spectrum	Recap
No scoring		First period	15:54 – Dave Schultz (1)
Borje Salming (2) – 15:18		Second period	04:24 – Ross Lonsberry (1); 05:34 – Don Saleski (1)
No scoring		Third period	No scoring
Wayne Thomas 24 saves / 27 shots		Goalie stats	Bernie Parent 31 saves / 32 shots

April 15	Philadelphia Flyers	4–5	Toronto Maple Leafs	Maple Leaf Gardens	Recap
Bobby Clarke (2) – pp – 12:00		First period	08:27 – pp – Scott Garland (1); 14:00 – pp – Claire Alexander (1)
Gary Dornhoefer (2) – 10:58; Jimmy Watson (1) – 11:11		Second period	03:25 – pp – Errol Thompson (1); 03:54 – pp – Ian Turnbull (1); 17:14 – pp – Stan Weir (1)
Bill Barber (1) – 15:12		Third period	No scoring
Bernie Parent 47 saves / 52 shots		Goalie stats	Wayne Thomas 24 saves / 28 shots

April 17	Philadelphia Flyers	3–4	Toronto Maple Leafs	Maple Leaf Gardens	Recap
Mel Bridgman (1) – 12:26		First period	03:11 – pp – Errol Thompson (2)
No scoring		Second period	16:12 – Borje Salming (3); 18:59 – pp – Lanny McDonald (4)
Reggie Leach (2) – 03:55; Mel Bridgman (2) – 08:30		Third period	05:57 – George Ferguson (2)
Bernie Parent 24 saves / 28 shots		Goalie stats	Wayne Thomas 25 saves / 28 shots

April 20	Toronto Maple Leafs	1–7	Philadelphia Flyers	Spectrum	Recap
No scoring		First period	03:55 – Bill Barber (2)
Bob Neely (2) – pp – 10:42		Second period	10:04 – sh – Don Saleski (2); 11:24 – Gary Dornhoefer (3); 11:37 – Don Saleski (3)
No scoring		Third period	04:17 – Don Saleski (4); 07:24 – Reggie Leach (3); 07:51 – Reggie Leach (4)
Wayne Thomas 27 saves / 33 shots Gord McRae 4 saves / 5 shots		Goalie stats	Bernie Parent 26 saves / 27 shots

April 22	Philadelphia Flyers	5–8	Toronto Maple Leafs	Maple Leaf Gardens	Recap
Orest Kindrachuk (2) – 04:52		First period	10:41 – pp – Darryl Sittler (1); 18:21 – sh – Errol Thompson (3)
Tom Bladon (1) – pp – 16:43; Reggie Leach (5) – 16:51		Second period	10:47 – pp – Darryl Sittler (2); 11:19 – Darryl Sittler (3); 19:21 – Darryl Sittler (4)
Bill Barber (3) – pp – 10:03; Larry Goodenough (1) – 14:31		Third period	02:06 – Darryl Sittler (5); 10:16 – Jack Valiquette (1); 15:31 – Claire Alexander (2)
Bernie Parent 31 saves / 39 shots		Goalie stats	Wayne Thomas 42 saves / 47 shots

April 25	Toronto Maple Leafs	3–7	Philadelphia Flyers	Spectrum	Recap
Jack Valiquette (2) – 01:24; Bob Neely (3) – pp – 18:56		First period	10:05 – pp – Andre Dupont (1)
No scoring		Second period	04:43 – Don Saleski (5); 05:48 – Mel Bridgman (3); 06:04 – Mel Bridgman (4); 07:59 – pp – Ross Lonsberry (2); 19:07 – Reggie Leach (6)
Ian Turnbull (2) – 18:24		Third period	09:45 – pp – Bill Barber (4)
Wayne Thomas 36 saves / 43 shots		Goalie stats	Bernie Parent 21 saves / 24 shots

Philadelphia won series 4–3

==== (3) Boston Bruins vs. (6) Los Angeles Kings ====
The Boston Bruins finished as the Adams Division regular season champions and third seed overall with 113 points. This was the first playoff series between these two teams. Boston won this year's regular season series earning 8 of 10 points.

April 11	Los Angeles Kings	0–4	Boston Bruins	Boston Garden	Recap
No scoring		First period	16:34 – pp – Ken Hodge (1); 16:57 – pp – Jean Ratelle (1)
No scoring		Second period	00:52 – sh – Dave Forbes (1)
No scoring		Third period	06:15 – pp – Jean Ratelle (2)
Rogie Vachon 19 saves / 23 shots		Goalie stats	Gilles Gilbert 21 saves / 21 shots

April 13	Los Angeles Kings	3–2	OT	Boston Bruins	Boston Garden	Recap
No scoring		First period		05:53 – Jean Ratelle (3)
Marcel Dionne (1) – 3:08		Second period		14:31 – pp – Johnny Bucyk (1)
Marcel Dionne (2) – pp – 06:53		Third period		No scoring
Butch Goring (1) – pp – 00:27		First overtime period		No scoring
Gary Edwards 28 saves / 30 shots		Goalie stats		Gerry Cheevers 20 saves / 23 shots

April 15	Boston Bruins	4–6	Los Angeles Kings	The Forum	Recap
Gregg Sheppard (1) – 05:02; Brad Park (1) – 07:37		First period	09:23 – pp – Mike Murphy (1); 16:17 – Marcel Dionne (3)
Don Marcotte (1) – pp – 16:58		Second period	02:21 – pp – Marcel Dionne (4)
Dallas Smith (1) – 15:33		Third period	02:51 – Marcel Dionne (5); 08:13 – Don Kozak (1); 12:57 – Bob Nevin (2)
Gilles Gilbert 28 saves/ 34 shots		Goalie stats	Rogie Vachon 27 saves / 31 shots

April 17	Boston Bruins	3–0	Los Angeles Kings	The Forum	Recap
Gregg Sheppard (2) – pp – 17:28		First period	No scoring
Jean Ratelle (4) – 03:52		Second period	No scoring
Don Marcotte (2) – 18:49		Third period	No scoring
Gerry Cheevers 27 saves / 27 shots		Goalie stats	Rogie Vachon 25 saves / 27 shots

April 20	Los Angeles Kings	1–7	Boston Bruins	Boston Garden	Recap
Marcel Dionne (6) – pp – 06:39		First period	17:41 – Don Marcotte (3)
No scoring		Second period	00:55 – Bobby Schmautz (1); 06:31 – pp – Ken Hodge (2); 13:52 – sh – Brad Park (2); 16:12 – pp – Jean Ratelle (5)
No scoring		Third period	09:03 – pp – Brad Park (3); 10:46 – Terry O'Reilly (1)
Gary Edwards 33 saves / 40 shots		Goalie stats	Gerry Cheevers 19 saves / 20 shots

April 22	Boston Bruins	3–4	OT	Los Angeles Kings	The Forum	Recap
No scoring		First period		No scoring
Bobby Schmautz (2) – 01:00; Darryl Edestrand (1) – 16:14; Gregg Sheppard (3) – 19:45		Second period		00:21 – Tom Williams (2)
No scoring		Third period		10:50 – Mike Corrigan (1); 17:48 – Mike Corrigan (2)
No scoring		First overtime period		18:28 – Butch Goring (2)
Gerry Cheevers 32 saves / 36 shots		Goalie stats		Rogie Vachon 24 saves / 27 shots

April 25	Los Angeles Kings	0–3	Boston Bruins	Boston Garden	Recap
No scoring		First period	No scoring
No scoring		Second period	09:42 – pp – Jean Ratelle (6); 12:21 – pp – Ken Hodge (3)
No scoring		Third period	06:16 – Jean Ratelle (7)
Rogie Vachon 35 saves / 38 shots		Goalie stats	Gilles Gilbert 15 saves / 15 shots

Boston won series 4–3

==== (4) Buffalo Sabres vs. (5) New York Islanders ====
This was the first playoff series between these two teams. The teams split this year's four-game regular season series.

In game five, the Islanders scored two goals in the final five minutes, including the game-winner by Bert Marshall with 19 seconds left to take a 3–2 series lead. Clark Gilles scored the game-winner with just over 14 minutes left in the third period of game six to send the Isles to the semifinals against the Canadiens.

April 11	New York Islanders	3–5	Buffalo Sabres	Buffalo Memorial Auditorium	Recap
No scoring		First period	05:37 – Rene Robert (1); 15:30 – Gilbert Perreault (2)
Billy Harris (2) – 12:43		Second period	00:19 – Don Luce (2); 16:28 – pp – Rick Martin (2)
Bob Nystrom (2) – pp – 06:19; Garry Howatt (2) – 16:37		Third period	07:26 – Rene Robert (2)
Chico Resch 18 saves / 22 shots Billy Smith 3 saves/ 4 shots		Goalie stats	Gerry Desjardins 19 saves / 22 shots

April 13	New York Islanders	2–3	OT	Buffalo Sabres	Buffalo Memorial Auditorium	Recap
No scoring		First period		10:27 – Brian Spencer (1)
No scoring		Second period		02:05 – Don Luce (3)
Denis Potvin (1) – pp – 13:07; J.P. Parise (2) – 18:55		Third period		No scoring
No scoring		First overtime period		14:04 – Danny Gare (3)
Billy Smith 40 saves / 43 shots		Goalie stats		Gerry Desjardins 27 saves / 29 shots

April 15	Buffalo Sabres	3–5	New York Islanders	Nassau Coliseum	Recap
No scoring		First period	03:23 – Billy Harris (3); 07:17 – Jude Drouin (1)
Gilbert Perreault (3) – 11:34; Don Luce (4) – 19:55		Second period	12:39 – J.P. Parise (3)
Rick Martin (3) – pp – 08:50		Third period	11:04 – Bill MacMillan (2); 11:39 – Billy Harris (4)
Gerry Desjardins 32 saves / 37 shots		Goalie stats	Billy Smith 25 saves / 28 shots

April 17	Buffalo Sabres	2–4	New York Islanders	Nassau Coliseum	Recap
Rene Robert (3) – 05:25		First period	02:08 – pp – Denis Potvin (2)
No scoring		Second period	13:00 – Garry Howatt (3); 18:02 – Denis Potvin (3); 18:44 – Billy Harris (5)
Danny Gare (4) – 12:31		Third period	No scoring
Gerry Desjardins 19 saves / 23 shots		Goalie stats	Billy Smith 27 saves / 29 shots

April 20	New York Islanders	4–3	Buffalo Sabres	Buffalo Memorial Auditorium	Recap
Andre St. Laurent (1) – 07:40; J.P. Parise (4) – pp – 14:10		First period	05:37 – Rick Martin (4); 06:57 – Danny Gare (5)
No scoring		Second period	No scoring
Denis Potvin (4) – 15:32; Bert Marshall (1) – 19:41		Third period	10:16 – Jim Lorentz (1)
Billy Smith 21 saves / 24 shots		Goalie stats	Gerry Desjardins 26 saves / 30 shots

April 22	Buffalo Sabres	2–3	New York Islanders	Nassau Coliseum	Recap
No scoring		First period	07:45 – Jude Drouin (2)
Gilbert Perreault (4) – 04:42		Second period	13:07 – pp – Ed Westfall (1)
Jerry Korab (1) – 4:09		Third period	05:58 – Clark Gillies (2)
Gerry Desjardins 26 saves / 29 shots		Goalie stats	Billy Smith 15 saves / 17 shots

New York won series 4–2

=== Semifinals ===
==== (1) Montreal Canadiens vs. (4) New York Islanders ====
This was the first playoff series meeting between these two teams.

April 27	New York Islanders	2–3	Montreal Canadiens	Montreal Forum	Recap
No scoring		First period	No scoring
Ed Westfall (2) – 03:40		Second period	08:05 – Steve Shutt (1)
Bill MacMillan (3) – 06:59		Third period	13:18 – Larry Robinson (2); 14:44 – Yvan Cournoyer (2)
Billy Smith 26 saves / 29 shots		Goalie stats	Ken Dryden 15 saves / 17 shots

April 29	New York Islanders	3–4	Montreal Canadiens	Montreal Forum	Recap
No scoring		First period	02:46 – Bob Gainey (1); 04:06 – Steve Shutt (2)
Jude Drouin (3) – pp – 16:33		Second period	06:23 – pp – Guy Lapointe (1)
Ralph Stewart (1) – pp – 04:34; Jude Drouin (4) – 08:14		Third period	02:42 – Serge Savard (2)
Billy Smith 17 saves / 21 shots Chico Resch 6 saves / 6 shots		Goalie stats	Ken Dryden 38 saves / 41 shots

May 1	Montreal Canadiens	3–2	New York Islanders	Nassau Coliseum	Recap
No scoring		First period	11:29 – Garry Howatt (4); 12:44 – Bryan Trottier (1)
No scoring		Second period	No scoring
Guy Lapointe (2) – 03:29; Jimmy Roberts (2) – sh – 11:50; Yvon Lambert (2) – 16:12		Third period	No scoring
Ken Dryden 33 saves / 35 shots		Goalie stats	Chico Resch 30 saves / 33 shots

May 4	Montreal Canadiens	2–5	New York Islanders	Nassau Coliseum	Recap
No scoring		First period	06:55 – Jude Drouin (5); 07:30 – Denis Potvin (5)
No scoring		Second period	05:53 – Jude Drouin (6); 13:29 – Bill MacMillan (4)
Guy Lafleur (4) – 17:21; Guy Lafleur (5) – 18:26		Third period	19:14 – pp-en – Lorne Henning (2)
Ken Dryden 28 saves / 32 shots		Goalie stats	Chico Resch 36 saves / 38 shots

May 6	New York Islanders	2–5	Montreal Canadiens	Montreal Forum	Recap
No scoring		First period	No scoring
Garry Howatt (5) – 11:51		Second period	02:38 – Steve Shutt (3); 10:29 – Murray Wilson (1); 19:01 – pp – Serge Savard (3)
Bob Nystrom (3) – 16:30		Third period	14:47 – pp – Peter Mahovlich (3); 17:10 – Steve Shutt (4)
Chico Resch 28 saves / 33 shots		Goalie stats	Ken Dryden 21 saves / 23 shots

Montreal won series 4–1

==== (2) Philadelphia Flyers vs. (3) Boston Bruins ====
This was the second playoff series meeting between these two teams. Philadelphia won the only previous meeting in a major upset in the 1974 Stanley Cup Finals in six games.

April 27	Boston Bruins	4–2	Philadelphia Flyers	Spectrum	Recap
Gary Doak (1) – 07:45		First period	18:45 – Orest Kindrachuk (3)
Ken Hodge (4) – pp – 12:09		Second period	15:10 – pp – Reggie Leach (7)
Dallas Smith (2) – 04:29; Gregg Sheppard (4) – 06:17		Third period	No scoring
Gilles Gilbert 25 saves / 27 shots		Goalie stats	Bernie Parent 20 saves / 24 shots

April 29	Boston Bruins	1–2	OT	Philadelphia Flyers	Spectrum	Recap
No scoring		First period		08:20 – Don Saleski (6)
No scoring		Second period		No scoring
Johnny Bucyk (2) – pp – 13:17		Third period		No scoring
No scoring		First overtime period		13:38 – Reggie Leach (8)
Gerry Cheevers 36 saves / 38 shots		Goalie stats		Wayne Stephenson 32 saves / 33 shots

May 2	Philadelphia Flyers	5–2	Boston Bruins	Boston Garden	Recap
Ross Lonsberry (3) – 05:26		First period	11:09 – pp – Jean Ratelle (8)
Bill Barber (5) – 19:11		Second period	13:56 – Wayne Cashman (1)
Mel Bridgman (5) – 02:11; Reggie Leach (9) – 07:02; Tom Bladon (2) – 14:30		Third period	No scoring
Wayne Stephenson 26 saves / 28 shots		Goalie stats	Gilles Gilbert 21 saves / 26 shots

May 4	Philadelphia Flyers	4–2	Boston Bruins	Boston Garden	Recap
Mel Bridgman (6) – 18:31		First period	11:49 – Terry O'Reilly (2); 19:39 – Terry O'Reilly (3)
Reggie Leach (10) – 00:23		Second period	No scoring
Orest Kindrachuk (4) – 02:59; Joe Watson (1) – 17:59		Third period	No scoring
Wayne Stephenson 27 saves / 29 shots		Goalie stats	Gerry Cheevers 21 saves / 25 shots

May 6	Boston Bruins	3–6	Philadelphia Flyers	Spectrum	Recap
No scoring		First period	05:45 – Reggie Leach (11)
Gregg Sheppard (5) – 00:59		Second period	02:02 – Reggie Leach (12); 08:51 – Reggie Leach (13); 17:09 – Reggie Leach (14)
Don Marcotte (4) – 06:09; Andre Savard (1) – 17:57		Third period	08:07 – Reggie Leach (15); 17:13 – Larry Goodenough (2)
Gilles Gilbert 15 saves / 21 shots		Goalie stats	Wayne Stephenson 25 saves / 28 shots

Philadelphia won series 4–1

=== Stanley Cup Finals ===
This was the second playoff series (and only Finals) meeting between these two teams. Montreal won the only previous meeting in the 1973 Stanley Cup Semifinals in five games.

The two-time defending Stanley Cup Champions, the Philadelphia Flyers, once again made it to the finals, but were swept in four games by the Montreal Canadiens.

May 9	Philadelphia Flyers	3–4	Montreal Canadiens	Montreal Forum	Recap
Reggie Leach (16) – 00:21; Ross Lonsberry (4) – 13:22		First period	No scoring
No scoring		Second period	04:04 – Jim Roberts (3); 06:30 – Larry Robinson (3)
Larry Goodenough (3) – pp – 05:17		Third period	10:02 – Jacques Lemaire (2); 18:38 – Guy Lapointe (3)
Wayne Stephenson 32 saves / 36 shots		Goalie stats	Ken Dryden 17 saves / 20 shots

May 11	Philadelphia Flyers	1–2	Montreal Canadiens	Montreal Forum	Recap
No scoring		First period	No scoring
No scoring		Second period	15:19 – sh – Jacques Lemaire (3)
Dave Schultz (2) – 17:35		Third period	02:41 – Guy Lafleur (6)
Wayne Stephenson 17 saves / 19 shots		Goalie stats	Ken Dryden 25 saves / 26 shots

May 13	Montreal Canadiens	3–2	Philadelphia Flyers	Spectrum	Recap
Steve Shutt (5) – pp – 03:17		First period	08:40 – pp – Reggie Leach (17); 18:14 – Reggie Leach (18)
Steve Shutt (6) – pp – 01:09		Second period	No scoring
Pierre Bouchard (1) – 09:16		Third period	No scoring
Ken Dryden 20 saves / 22 shots		Goalie stats	Wayne Stephenson 22 saves / 25 shots

May 16	Montreal Canadiens	5–3	Philadelphia Flyers	Spectrum	Recap
Steve Shutt (7) – pp – 05:35; Pierre Bouchard (2) – pp – 11:48		First period	00:40 – Reggie Leach (19); 18:20 – pp – Bill Barber (6)
Yvan Cournoyer (3) – pp – 19:49		Second period	13:59 – pp – Anrde Dupont (2)
Guy Lafleur (7) – 14:18; Peter Mahovlich (4) – 15:16		Third period	No scoring
Ken Dryden 21 saves / 24 shots		Goalie stats	Wayne Stephenson 25 saves / 30 shots

Montreal won series 4–0

== Awards ==
1976 NHL awards
Prince of Wales Trophy: (Wales Conference regular season champion)	Montreal Canadiens
Clarence S. Campbell Bowl: (Campbell Conference regular season champion)	Philadelphia Flyers
Art Ross Trophy: (Top scorer, regular season)	Guy Lafleur, Montreal Canadiens
Bill Masterton Memorial Trophy: (Perseverance, sportsmanship, and dedication)	Rod Gilbert, New York Rangers
Calder Memorial Trophy: (Top first-year player)	Bryan Trottier, New York Islanders
Conn Smythe Trophy: (Most valuable player, playoffs)	Reggie Leach, Philadelphia Flyers
Hart Memorial Trophy: (Most valuable player, regular season)	Bobby Clarke, Philadelphia Flyers
Jack Adams Award: (Best coach)	Don Cherry, Boston Bruins
James Norris Memorial Trophy: (Best defenceman)	Denis Potvin, New York Islanders
Lady Byng Memorial Trophy: (Excellence and sportsmanship)	Jean Ratelle, New York Rangers/Boston Bruins
Lester B. Pearson Award: (Outstanding player, regular season)	Guy Lafleur, Montreal Canadiens
Vezina Trophy: (Goaltender(s) of team(s) with best goaltending record)	Ken Dryden, Montreal Canadiens

=== All-Star teams ===
First Team	Position	Second Team
Ken Dryden, Montreal Canadiens	G	Glenn Resch, New York Islanders
Denis Potvin, New York Islanders	D	Borje Salming, Toronto Maple Leafs
Brad Park, Boston Bruins/New York Rangers	D	Guy Lapointe, Montreal Canadiens
Bobby Clarke, Philadelphia Flyers	C	Gilbert Perreault, Buffalo Sabres
Guy Lafleur, Montreal Canadiens	RW	Reggie Leach, Philadelphia Flyers
Bill Barber, Philadelphia Flyers	LW	Rick Martin, Buffalo Sabres

== Player statistics ==
=== Scoring leaders ===
Note: GP = Games played; G = Goals; A = Assists; Pts = Points

Player	Team	GP	G	A	Pts	PIM
Guy Lafleur	Montreal Canadiens	80	56	69	125	36
Bobby Clarke	Philadelphia Flyers	76	30	89	119	136
Gilbert Perreault	Buffalo Sabres	80	44	69	113	36
Bill Barber	Philadelphia Flyers	80	50	62	112	104
Pierre Larouche	Pittsburgh Penguins	76	53	58	111	33
Jean Ratelle	New York Rangers/Boston Bruins	80	36	69	105	18
Pete Mahovlich	Montreal Canadiens	80	34	71	105	76
Jean Pronovost	Pittsburgh Penguins	80	52	52	104	24
Darryl Sittler	Toronto Maple Leafs	79	41	59	100	90
Syl Apps Jr.	Pittsburgh Penguins	80	32	67	99	24

Source: NHL.

=== Leading goaltenders ===
Note: GP = Games played; Min – Minutes played; GA = Goals against; GAA = Goals against average; W = Wins; L = Losses; T = Ties; SO = Shutouts

Player	Team	GP	MIN	GA	GAA	W	L	T	SO
Ken Dryden	Montreal Canadiens	62	3580	121	2.03	42	10	8	8
Chico Resch	N.Y. Islanders	44	2546	88	2.07	23	11	8	7
Dan Bouchard	Atlanta Flames	47	2671	113	2.54	19	17	8	2
Wayne Stephenson	Philadelphia Flyers	66	3819	164	2.58	40	10	13	1
Billy Smith	N.Y. Islanders	39	2254	98	2.61	19	10	9	3
Gilles Gilbert	Boston Bruins	55	3123	151	2.90	33	8	10	3
Tony Esposito	Chicago Black Hawks	68	4003	198	2.97	30	23	13	4
Rogie Vachon	L.A. Kings	51	3060	160	3.14	26	20	5	5
Wayne Thomas	Toronto Maple Leafs	64	3684	196	3.19	28	24	12	2
Gary Simmons	California Golden Seals	40	2360	131	3.33	15	19	5	2

=== Other statistics ===
- Plus-minus: Bobby Clarke, Philadelphia Flyers

== Coaches ==
=== Patrick Division ===
- Atlanta Flames: Fred Creighton
- New York Islanders: Al Arbour
- New York Rangers: Ron Stewart and John Ferguson Sr.
- Philadelphia Flyers: Fred Shero

=== Adams Division ===
- Boston Bruins: Don Cherry
- Buffalo Sabres: Floyd Smith
- California Golden Seals: Jack Evans
- Toronto Maple Leafs: Red Kelly

=== Norris Division ===
- Detroit Red Wings: Alex Delvecchio
- Los Angeles Kings: Bob Pulford
- Montreal Canadiens: Scotty Bowman
- Pittsburgh Penguins: Marc Boileau and Ken Schinkel
- Washington Capitals: Milt Schmidt and Tom McVie

=== Smythe Division ===
- Chicago Black Hawks: Billy Reay
- Kansas City Scouts: Bep Guidolin, Sid Abel and Eddie Bush
- Minnesota North Stars: Ted Harris
- St. Louis Blues: Garry Young, Lynn Patrick and Leo Boivin
- Vancouver Canucks: Phil Maloney

== Debuts ==
The following is a list of players of note who played their first NHL game in 1975–76 (listed with their first team, asterisk(*) marks debut in playoffs):

- Willi Plett, Atlanta Flames
- Dennis Maruk, California Golden Seals
- Bob Murray, Chicago Blackhawks
- Gary Sargent, Los Angeles Kings
- Doug Jarvis, Montreal Canadiens
- Doug Risebrough, Montreal Canadiens
- Bryan Trottier, New York Islanders
- Mel Bridgman, Philadelphia Flyers

== Last games ==
The following is a list of players of note that played their last game in the NHL in 1975–76 (listed with their last team):

- Gary Bergman, Kansas City Scouts
- Bryan Hextall Jr., Minnesota North Stars
- Chico Maki, Chicago Black Hawks
- Bob Nevin, Los Angeles Kings
- Noel Price, Atlanta Flames
- Mickey Redmond, Detroit Red Wings
- Bill White, Chicago Black Hawks
- Terry Crisp, Philadelphia Flyers
- Andre Boudrias, Vancouver Canucks
- Tommy Williams, Washington Capitals

NOTE: Boudrias finished his major professional career in the World Hockey Association.

== Broadcasting ==
Hockey Night in Canada on CBC Television televised Saturday night regular season games and Stanley Cup playoff games. This was the last season that HNIC aired both radio and television broadcasts of games; the broadcasts would become exclusive to television the next season. This was also the last season that CTV regularly aired HNIC-produced Wednesday night regular season game telecasts before the network started to give the rights to these midweek games back to local stations. CBC did not televise any opening round playoff games this postseason, selling those rights back to the individual Canadian teams.

Unable to sign a U.S. national television contract, the league put together a broadcast syndication package called the NHL Network to have games aired on various American independent stations. The 1976 Stanley Cup Finals on the NHL Network marked the first time that the NHL's championship series was nationally televised in its entirety in the United States.

On January 4, 1976, CBS decided to televise the Soviet Wings–Buffalo Sabres Super Series game nationally in the U.S., but that was the network's only involvement in broadcasting an NHL team this season.

== See also ==
- List of Stanley Cup champions
- 1975 NHL amateur draft
- 1975–76 NHL transactions
- 29th National Hockey League All-Star Game
- National Hockey League All-Star Game
- List of WHA seasons
- Lester Patrick Trophy
- Ice hockey at the 1976 Winter Olympics
- 1975 in sports
- 1976 in sports
