= Dean Hopkins =

Canadian ice hockey player

- Born: June 6, 1959 (age 66) Cobourg, Ontario, Canada
- Height: 6 ft 1 in (185 cm)
- Weight: 210 lb (95 kg; 15 st 0 lb)
- Position: Right wing
- Shot: Right
- Played for: Los Angeles Kings; Edmonton Oilers; Quebec Nordiques
- NHL draft: 29th overall, 1979; Los Angeles Kings
- Playing career: 1979–1991

Dean Hopkins (born June 6, 1959) is a Canadian former professional ice hockey right winger. He played in the National Hockey League with the Los Angeles Kings, Edmonton Oilers, and Quebec Nordiques between 1979 and 1989.

== Playing career ==
Dean Hopkins started off his junior career with the 1974–75 Owen Sound Greys of the Mid-Ontario Junior B Hockey League, moving on to the Ontario Hockey League's London Knights from 1975 until 1979. He was drafted 29th overall by the Los Angeles Kings in the second round of the 1979 NHL entry draft and spent most of the next four seasons with Los Angeles. Over the next eight seasons, Hopkins played in various minor league cities, but also managed short stops with the Edmonton Oilers and Quebec Nordiques. Hopkins played senior hockey with the Durham Huskies and also had a brief coaching stint in the American Hockey League.

== Career statistics ==
=== Regular season and playoffs ===
			Regular season					Playoffs
Season	Team	League	GP	G	A	Pts	PIM	GP	G	A	Pts	PIM
1974–75	Owen Sound Greys	MOJBHL	38	21	20	41	44	—	—	—	—	—
1975–76	London Knights	OMJHL	53	4	14	18	50	—	—	—	—	—
1976–77	London Knights	OMJHL	63	19	26	45	67	19	4	8	12	17
1977–78	London Knights	OHA	67	19	34	53	70	11	1	5	6	24
1978–79	London Knights	OMJHL	65	37	55	92	149	7	6	0	6	27
1979–80	Los Angeles Kings	NHL	60	8	6	14	39	4	0	1	1	5
1980–81	Los Angeles Kings	NHL	67	8	18	26	118	4	1	0	1	9
1981–82	Los Angeles Kings	NHL	41	2	13	15	102	10	0	4	4	15
1982–83	Los Angeles Kings	NHL	49	5	12	17	43	—	—	—	—	—
1982–83	New Haven Nighthawks	AHL	20	9	8	17	58	—	—	—	—	—
1983–84	New Haven Nighthawks	AHL	79	35	47	82	162	—	—	—	—	—
1984–85	New Haven Nighthawks	AHL	20	7	10	17	38	—	—	—	—	—
1984–85	Nova Scotia Oilers	AHL	49	13	17	30	93	6	1	2	3	20
1985–86	Edmonton Oilers	NHL	1	0	0	0	0	—	—	—	—	—
1985–86	Nova Scotia Oilers	AHL	60	23	32	55	133	—	—	—	—	—
1986–87	Nova Scotia Oilers	AHL	59	20	25	45	84	1	0	0	0	5
1987–88	Nova Scotia Oilers	AHL	44	20	22	42	122	5	2	5	7	16
1988–89	Quebec Nordiques	NHL	5	0	2	2	4
1988–89	Halifax Citadels	AHL	53	18	31	49	116	3	0	1	1	6
1989–90	Halifax Citadels	AHL	54	23	32	55	167	6	1	4	5	8
1990–91	Halifax Citadels	AHL	3	2	0	2	2	—	—	—	—	—
NHL totals			223	23	51	74	306	18	1	5	6	29
