= Norman Tustin =

Canadian ice hockey player

- Born: January 3, 1919; Regina, Saskatchewan, Canada
- Died: August 16, 1998 (aged 79)
- Height: 5 ft 10 in (178 cm)
- Weight: 174 lb (79 kg; 12 st 6 lb)
- Position: Left wing
- Shot: Left
- Played for: New York Rangers
- Playing career: 1939–1950

Norman Robert Tustin (January 3, 1919 in Regina, Saskatchewan — August 16, 1998) was a professional ice hockey player who played 18 games in the National Hockey League with the New York Rangers during the 1941–42 season.

== Career statistics ==
=== Regular season and playoffs ===
			Regular season					Playoffs
Season	Team	League	GP	G	A	Pts	PIM	GP	G	A	Pts	PIM
1938–39	Owen Sound Greys	OHA	—	—	—	—	—	—	—	—	—	—
1939–40	Atlantic City Seagulls	EAHL	61	31	16	47	23	3	6	1	7	2
1940–41	Minneapolis Millers	AHA	48	29	21	50	12	3	1	2	3	0
1941–42	New York Rangers	NHL	18	2	4	6	0	—	—	—	—	—
1941–42	New Haven Eagles	AHL	31	19	11	30	2	2	0	0	0	0
1942–43	Toronto RCAF	OHA Sr	6	4	5	9	5	3	2	0	2	2
1942–43	Toronto RCAF	Al-Cup	—	—	—	—	—	3	2	0	2	2
1943–44	Toronto RCAF	OHA Sr	15	7	9	16	12	—	—	—	—	—
1946–47	New Haven Ramblers	AHL	64	18	18	36	8	3	0	1	1	0
1947–48	Hershey Bears	AHL	13	1	6	7	4	—	—	—	—	—
1947–48	St. Louis Flyers	AHL	50	17	21	38	0	—	—	—	—	—
1948–49	St. Louis Flyers	AHL	28	5	13	18	2	—	—	—	—	—
1949–50	St. Louis Flyers	AHL	30	7	5	12	6	—	—	—	—	—
1949–50	Kansas City Pla-mors	USHL	21	10	11	21	9	3	0	0	0	0
1951–52	Sarnia Sailors	OHA Sr	5	3	2	5	2	—	—	—	—	—
AHL totals			216	67	74	141	22	5	0	1	1	0
NHL totals			18	2	4	6	0	—	—	—	—	—
