= Ed Van Impe =

Canadian ice hockey player (1940–2025)

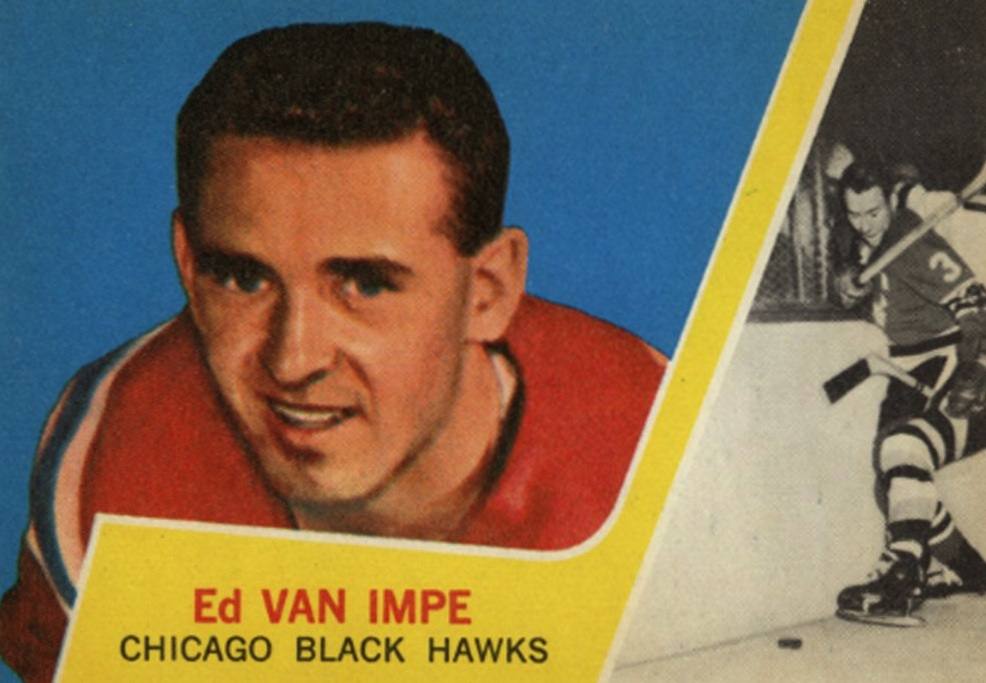
- Born: May 27, 1940 Saskatoon, Saskatchewan, Canada
- Died: April 29, 2025 (aged 84) Vancouver, British Columbia, Canada
- Height: 5 ft 10 in (178 cm)
- Weight: 200 lb (91 kg; 14 st 4 lb)
- Position: Defence
- Shot: Left
- Played for: Chicago Black Hawks; Philadelphia Flyers; Pittsburgh Penguins
- Playing career: 1961–1977

Edward Charles Van Impe (May 27, 1940 – April 29, 2025) was a Canadian professional ice hockey defenceman who played in the National Hockey League (NHL) for the Chicago Black Hawks, Philadelphia Flyers, and Pittsburgh Penguins.

== Playing career ==
After playing his first five professional seasons with the Buffalo Bisons of the AHL, Ed Van Impe saw his first NHL action with the Chicago Black Hawks in 1966–67. He had a solid rookie season, amassing 19 points (eight goals and 11 assists) and finishing as the runner-up to Bobby Orr for the Calder Memorial Trophy as Rookie of the Year.

Left unprotected for the expansion draft that off-season, the Philadelphia Flyers picked Van Impe off the Black Hawks' roster. He played eight and a half seasons with the Flyers and was one of the team's best defensive blueliners, serving as the second captain in franchise history, from 1968 to 1973. His forte was hitting and shot-blocking, as well as clearing opponents from the area of his team's net. He was part of the "Broad Street Bullies" teams that won back-to-back Stanley Cups in 1974 and 1975.

On January 11, 1976, at the Spectrum, Van Impe's Flyers, as part of Super Series '76, played a memorable exhibition game against the Soviet Union's dominant Central Red Army team. Having just finished serving a hooking penalty, Van Impe left the penalty box and immediately placed a devastating hit on the Soviet Union's Valeri Kharlamov, knocking the latter unconscious and causing him to lie prone on the ice for a short while. Van Impe's hit was not penalized and it resulted in the Soviets leaving the ice midway through the first period in protest. After a 17-minute delay, the Soviets finally returned to the ice after they were warned that they would lose their salary for the entire series (200,000 USD) if they did not.

Van Impe was traded to the Pittsburgh Penguins along with Bobby Taylor for Gary Inness and cash on March 9, 1976 and he retired following the 1976–77 season.

== Death ==
Van Impe died in Vancouver on April 29, 2025, at the age of 84.

== Awards ==
- Won two Stanley Cups with the Philadelphia Flyers (1974, 1975)
- Played in NHL All-Star Game three times (1969, 1974, 1975)
- Inducted into Flyers Hall of Fame (1993)

== Career statistics ==
=== Regular season and playoffs ===
			Regular season					Playoffs
Season	Team	League	GP	G	A	Pts	PIM	GP	G	A	Pts	PIM
1956–57	Saskatoon Quakers	SJHL	2	0	0	0	0	—	—	—	—	—
1957–58	Saskatoon Quakers	SJHL	49	2	2	4	58	—	—	—	—	—
1958–59	Saskatoon Quakers	SJHL	48	0	23	23	150	5	0	5	5	24
1959–60	Saskatoon Quakers	SJHL	58	11	42	53	136	7	1	2	3	4
1960–61	Calgary Stampeders	WHL	66	4	15	19	123	5	0	2	2	16
1961–62	Buffalo Bisons	AHL	70	0	19	19	172	11	0	1	1	25
1962–63	Buffalo Bisons	AHL	65	3	12	15	196	13	1	4	5	34
1963–64	Buffalo Bisons	AHL	70	4	22	26	193	—	—	—	—	—
1964–65	Buffalo Bisons	AHL	72	5	6	11	197	9	0	0	0	26
1965–66	Buffalo Bisons	AHL	70	9	28	37	153	—	—	—	—	—
1966–67	Chicago Black Hawks	NHL	61	8	11	19	111	6	0	0	0	26
1967–68	Philadelphia Flyers	NHL	67	4	13	17	141	7	0	4	4	11
1968–69	Philadelphia Flyers	NHL	68	7	12	19	112	1	0	0	0	17
1969–70	Philadelphia Flyers	NHL	65	0	10	10	117	—	—	—	—	—
1970–71	Philadelphia Flyers	NHL	77	0	11	11	80	4	0	1	1	8
1971–72	Philadelphia Flyers	NHL	73	4	9	13	78	—	—	—	—	—
1972–73	Philadelphia Flyers	NHL	72	1	11	12	76	11	0	0	0	16
1973–74	Philadelphia Flyers	NHL	77	2	16	18	119	17	1	2	3	41
1974–75	Philadelphia Flyers	NHL	78	1	17	18	109	17	0	4	4	28
1975–76	Philadelphia Flyers	NHL	40	0	8	8	60	—	—	—	—	—
1975–76	Pittsburgh Penguins	NHL	12	0	5	5	16	3	0	1	1	2
1976–77	Pittsburgh Penguins	NHL	10	0	3	3	6	—	—	—	—	—
NHL totals			700	27	126	153	1025	66	1	12	13	131

Preceded by Lou Angotti	Philadelphia Flyers captain 1968–73	Succeeded by Bobby Clarke
