= Curtis Sanford =

Canadian professional ice hockey goaltender

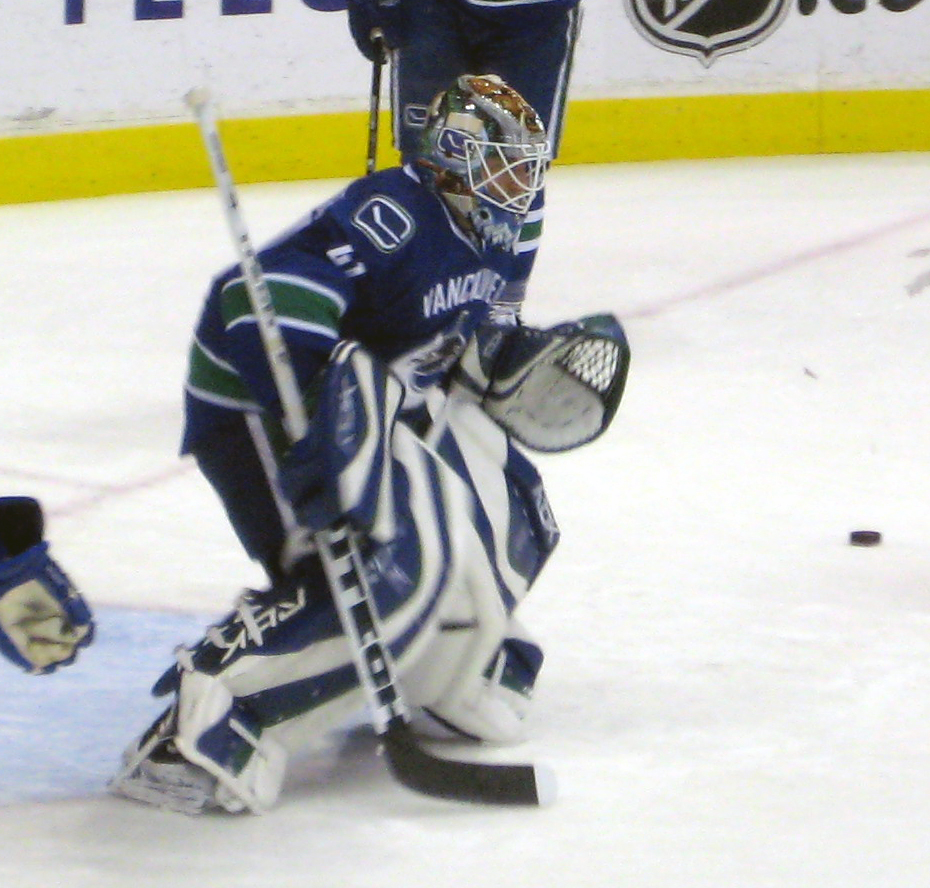
- Sanford in 2008 as a member of the Vancouver Canucks.
- Born: October 5, 1979 (age 47) Owen Sound, Ontario, Canada
- Height: 5 ft 10 in (178 cm)
- Weight: 190 lb (86 kg; 13 st 8 lb)
- Position: Goaltender
- Caught: Left
- Played for: St. Louis Blues; Vancouver Canucks; Columbus Blue Jackets; Lokomotiv Yaroslavl
- NHL draft: Undrafted
- Playing career: 2000–2015

Curtis Sanford (born October 5, 1979) is a Canadian professional ice hockey coach and former goaltender who last played for Lokomotiv Yaroslavl of the Kontinental Hockey League (KHL). He is currently a goalie coach for the Toronto Maple Leafs. He previously played in the National Hockey League (NHL) with the St. Louis Blues, Vancouver Canucks, and Columbus Blue Jackets.

== Playing career ==
Sanford played junior hockey for the Wiarton Wolves of the Western Junior C Hockey League, the Collingwood Blues of the Ontario Provincial Junior A Hockey League (OPJHL), the Owen Sound Greys of the Midwestern Junior B Hockey League and the Owen Sound Platers of the Ontario Hockey League (OHL) before turning professional.

Undrafted out of junior, Sanford was signed as a free agent by the St. Louis Blues after his final year with the Platers in 2000, and spent his first five seasons in the club's farm system between the Peoria Rivermen of the ECHL and Worcester IceCats of the American Hockey League (AHL). Sanford earned a call-up with the Blues during the 2002–03 season after injuries to goaltenders Fred Brathwaite and Brent Johnson in October. He played in his first game when fellow rookie call-up Reinhard Divis also went down with an injury after the first period on October 17, 2002, against the Columbus Blue Jackets. He made 12 saves in relief in a 7–1 victory for the Blues. Sanford briefly earned the starting position in the absence of the Blues' usual goaltenders before going down with an injury himself, a high-ankle sprain, on October 24 against the Edmonton Oilers. He returned to start in several more games and posted a 5–1 record and a 1.96 GAA in his first stint with the Blues before being returned to Worcester.

In 2005–06, Sanford appeared poised to play backup to the recently acquired Patrick Lalime. However, as Lalime struggled, Sanford seized the starting position and was having a career year until going down with a sprained ACL in his left knee in March. Before missing the remainder of the season, Sanford had a 13–13–5 record with a 2.66 goals against average (GAA) and .908 save percentage. The Blues finished in last place that year. Recovered from his knee injury, Sanford returned the next season and competed with Manny Legace for the starting position. In November, he was sidelined for several games with a groin strain, then re-injured his groin in December, missing an extended period of time. Sanford returned to complete the season but saw his numbers decrease to an 8–12–5 record with a 3.18 GAA and .888 save percentage.

Sanford became an unrestricted free agent in the off-season and on July 3, 2007, the Vancouver Canucks signed him to a one-year, $600,000 contract to back-up starting goaltender Roberto Luongo. He appeared in 16 games in the 2007–08 season, filling in for Luongo mostly in light of his rib injury in December. Posting a 2.83 GAA, he was re-signed to another one-year contract worth $650,000 by the Canucks on July 3, 2008.

Before the start of the 2008–09 season, Sanford and the Canucks held a contest challenging fans to submit artwork for a new mask design. This was to go along with his new nickname of "The Big C.S." Sanford's nickname, "the Sandman", inspired his previous mask designs. After Luongo suffered a groin injury in late November, Sanford assumed the starting position. However, Sanford himself became prone to injury and suffered back spasms in a game against the Columbus Blue Jackets on December 1, 2008, before being placed on injured reserve with a groin injury on December 30. With the subsequent acquisition of Jason LaBarbera and the imminent return of Luongo, Sanford was placed on waivers by the Canucks on January 14, 2009. Clearing waivers, he was assigned to the Manitoba Moose of the AHL, where he completed the season.

In the off-season, Sanford signed a one-year, two-way contract with the Montreal Canadiens on July 20, 2009, for the 2009–10 season. With both Jaroslav Halák and Carey Price minding net, Sanford was assigned to the Canadiens' AHL affiliate, the Hamilton Bulldogs. After a successful season with the Bulldogs, he signed a one-year extension.

Sanford signed a one-year contract and spent the 2011–12 season with the Columbus Blue Jackets, appearing in 36 games. Following the season, he agreed to terms on a contract with Kontinental Hockey League (KHL) team Lokomotiv Yaroslavl; Lokomotiv were still rebuilding after losing its entire team in the 2011 Lokomotiv Yaroslavl plane crash.

At the conclusion of his third season with Lokomotiv, Sanford announced his retirement from professional hockey on March 7, 2015.

On July 5, 2022, it was announced that Sanford would be joining the Toronto Maple Leafs as a goaltending coach.

== Career statistics ==
			Regular season									Playoffs
Season	Team	League	GP	W	L	T/OT	MIN	GA	SO	GAA	SV%	GP	W	L	MIN	GA	SO	GAA	SV%
1994–95	Wiarton Wolves	WJCHL	18				949	98	0	6.20		—	—	—	—	—	—	—	—
1995–96	Collingwood Blues	OPJHL	21				2128	74	0	3.54		—	—	—	—	—	—	—	—
1996–97	Owen Sound Greys	MWJHL	6				360	28	0	4.68		—	—	—	—	—	—	—	—
1996–97	Owen Sound Platers	OHL	19	4	8	1	847	77	0	5.45	.878	—	—	—	—	—	—	—	—
1997–98	Owen Sound Platers	OHL	30	13	10	2	1542	114	1	4.44	.895	9	4	4	456	30	1	3.95	—
1998–99	Owen Sound Platers	OHL	56	30	16	5	2998	191	2	3.82	.895	16	9	7	960	58	0	3.63	—
1999–00	Owen Sound Platers	OHL	53	18	26	6	3124	198	1	3.80	.898	—	—	—	—	—	—	—	—
1999–00	Missouri River Otters	UHL	6	3	1	0	237	6	0	1.52	.946	—	—	—	—	—	—	—	—
2000–01	Peoria Rivermen	ECHL	24	15	7	4	1511	48	3	1.91	.925	14	9	4	813	28	2	2.07	—
2000–01	Worcester IceCats	AHL	5	3	0	1	237	16	0	4.06	.857	—	—	—	—	—	—	—	—
2001–02	Peoria Rivermen	ECHL	24	13	8	2	1418	58	1	2.45	.906	—	—	—	—	—	—	—	—
2001–02	Worcester IceCats	AHL	9	5	4	2	537	22	0	2.46	.922	—	—	—	—	—	—	—	—
2002–03	Worcester IceCats	AHL	41	18	14	8	2317	93	3	2.41	.919	3	0	3	179	8	0	2.68	.924
2002–03	St. Louis Blues	NHL	8	5	1	0	397	13	1	1.96	.912	—	—	—	—	—	—	—	—
2003–04	Worcester IceCats	AHL	43	20	16	3	2367	84	5	2.13	.921	9	4	5	569	24	0	2.53	.922
2004–05	Worcester IceCats	AHL	50	19	25	2	2743	123	2	2.69	.901	—	—	—	—	—	—	—	—
2005–06	St. Louis Blues	NHL	34	13	13	5	1830	81	3	2.66	.908	—	—	—	—	—	—	—	—
2005–06	Peoria Rivermen	AHL	6	4	2	0	358	11	2	1.84	.929	—	—	—	—	—	—	—	—
2006–07	St. Louis Blues	NHL	31	8	12	5	1491	79	0	3.18	.888	—	—	—	—	—	—	—	—
2006–07	Peoria Rivermen	AHL	2	1	1	0	119	49	0	2.52	.898	—	—	—	—	—	—	—	—
2007–08	Vancouver Canucks	NHL	16	4	3	1	679	32	0	2.83	.898	—	—	—	—	—	—	—	—
2008–09	Vancouver Canucks	NHL	19	7	8	0	972	42	1	2.59	.906	—	—	—	—	—	—	—	—
2008–09	Manitoba Moose	AHL	16	7	3	3	865	25	2	1.73	.936	1	0	1	43	1	0	1.40	.957
2009–10	Hamilton Bulldogs	AHL	41	23	11	3	2230	79	4	2.13	.916	9	5	4	565	19	2	2.02	.925
2010–11	Hamilton Bulldogs	AHL	40	22	13	2	2274	73	5	1.93	.930	—	—	—	—	—	—	—	—
2011–12	Columbus Blue Jackets	NHL	36	10	18	4	1983	86	1	2.60	.911	—	—	—	—	—	—	—	—
2012–13	Lokomotiv Yaroslavl	KHL	24	12	7	3	1385	52	0	2.25	.927	6	2	4	414	14	0	2.03	.944
2013–14	Lokomotiv Yaroslavl	KHL	40	18	17	2	2218	67	7	1.81	.938	18	9	9	1125	36	2	1.92	.934
2014–15	Lokomotiv Yaroslavl	KHL	38	15	15	4	2191	89	2	2.44	.918	4	2	2	230	11	0	2.87	.905
NHL totals			144	47	55	15	7354	333	6	2.72	.904	—	—	—	—	—	—	—	—
KHL totals			102	45	39	9	5793	208	9	2.20	.928	28	13	15	1768	61	2	2.20	.929

== Awards and honours ==
Award	Year
ECHL
Second All-Star Team	2000–01
AHL
Harry "Hap" Holmes Memorial Award	2009–10
Second All-Star Team	2010–11
KHL
First All-Star Team	2013–14
