= Owen Sound Greys =

Series of junior ice hockey teams in Ontario

- City: Owen Sound, Ontario, Canada
- League: Greater Ontario Junior Hockey League
- Operated: 1973–2012
- Home arena: Harry Lumley Bayshore Community Centre
- Colours: orange, black, white
- Affiliates: Orangeville Flyers (OJHL); Hanover Barons (WJCHL)

Franchise history
- 1973–1976: Owen Sound Salvagemen
- 1976–1977: Owen Sound Steelers
- 1977–1980: Owen Sound Kings
- 1980–1983: Owen Sound Mercurys
- 1983–2000: Owen Sound Greys
- 2000–2006: Owen Sound-Saugeen Shores Greys
- 2006–2012: Owen Sound Greys
- 2012–2020: Brampton Bombers
- 2020–present: Caledon Bombers

The Owen Sound Greys were several Canadian junior ice hockey teams based in Owen Sound, Ontario. The most recent team played in the Greater Ontario Junior Hockey League, until relocated to Brampton amid financial struggles in 2012. The original Greys won the 1924 Memorial Cup and 1927 1927 Memorial Cup, played from 1913 until 1977, last playing in the Southern Ontario Junior A Hockey League. The Intermediate Greys played from 1978 until 1982 to obtain the Hardy Cup, they departed with the fall of the Major Intermediate A Hockey League. The final team began in 1973 as a Junior D club and worked its way up to winning the Ontario Junior A Hockey League Championship in 1987.

== History ==
=== The farm team (1973–1983) ===
The Salvagemen had been formed in 1973 as a Junior C team. Initially they were members of the Northern Junior D Hockey League but were separated from that group come playoff time. Owen Sound endured a five-week layoff between the end of the regular season and the start of what was called the "Super C" playoffs. The "Super C" Champion would be awarded the George S. Dudley Trophy. The Salvagemen finally met the Woodstock Navy-Vets but were swept 4–0.

The next season saw the Salvagemen in a true Junior C group, the Central Junior C Hockey League. They finished sixth and last in the regular season, then began the Super C playoffs, which appear to have been established for teams with larger population bases. Owen Sound was in an eight-game round-robin with London and the Brantford Gunners; the Salvagemen and the Gunners advanced. Owen Sound met Woodstock in the final once again but fared no better, falling in four straight.

When the Junior B Greys jumped to Junior A, the Salvagemen took their place in the Mid-Ontario Junior B league but couldn't pick up where the Greys had left off. They finished sixth in 1975–76 and were swept by Orillia in the first playoff round. They placed fifth and out of the playoffs the next year. A name change to the Kings didn't help, as they again wound up fifth and on the sidelines in 1977–78. The Mid-Ontario loop was wound down at this time and the Kings were placed in the Midwestern Junior B Hockey League. The other four teams (Orillia, Barrie, the Oak Ridges Dynes and the Thornhill Thunderbirds) went to the new Central league.

The Owen Sound Kings changed names again in 1980, becoming the Owen Sound Rutherford Mercurys, known simply as the Mercurys. This lasted until 1983.

=== The Greys return (1983–1987) ===
The Mercurys organization merged with that of the Greys in 1983, leaving one top-level hockey team in Owen Sound for the first time in 15 years (see the Owen Sound Crescents). The new entity retained the name "Greys" and played two more seasons in the Midwestern league.

The Greys made another move out of Junior B, stepping up to the Ontario Junior Hockey League in 1985. They affiliated with the Guelph Platers of the Ontario Hockey League and performed very well in their new surroundings, finishing in third place in their first season and topping the standings in their second. They also won the Frank L. Buckland Trophy as playoff champions in 1986–87, their first title since 1974–75, and advanced to the all-Ontario championship against the Nickel Centre Power Trains of the Northern Ontario Junior Hockey League.

The OHA and NOJHL had been meeting annually since 1978–79 to determine the winner of the Dudley Hewitt Cup and the provincial representative for the Centennial Cup national Tier II Junior A championship. Every year previously, the OHA champion had prevailed. But Nickel Centre ended the streak, upsetting the Greys 4–2 in a best-of-seven series.

The OJHL folded after the season; for the second time in a decade, Owen Sound was left hanging by the collapse of its Tier II Junior A league. This time, though, the Greys were able to return to the Junior B level.

=== Back in "B" (1987–2012) ===
The team has remained in the Midwestern league ever since, by far its longest continuous stretch in any one circuit, but have only had middling success. One of the most disappointing seasons was 1992–93 when the Greys put together a powerful lineup that finished second in the standings, the first time they had ever placed so high in the Midwest. They were led by league scoring champion Bob McAskill, who had 36 goals, 69 assists and 105 points, but failed to advance beyond the semifinal playoff round.

It wasn't until 1995–96 that the Greys finally advanced to a final series. They finished a lowly sixth but eliminated the Kitchener Dutchmen in overtime of the seventh and deciding game of their semifinal series. They met the powerful Stratford Cullitons in the final and lost 4–1.

Owen Sound could not build on that success and it wasn't until 1999–2000 that the Greys returned to the playoff final. Coincidentally, it also marked the return of an Owen Sound player to the top of the league scoring parade, as Ryan Dudgeon put up 59 goals and 104 points to tie Mike Carter of the Cambridge Winterhawks. The Greys reeled off series wins over Kitchener and Stratford—marking the first time the Cullitons had been swept from the playoffs since 1983—but fell short against Cambridge, losing 4–2. The Winterhawks did not lose again that year, rolling to their first Sutherland Cup championship.

This time the Greys were able to use a final appearance as a bit of a stepping stone. In 2000-01 they earned a first-place finish for the first time since 1987 and blew past the Guelph Dominators in the quarter-finals, earning a rematch with Cambridge. The Winterhawks had finished four places and 17 points behind the Greys. That didn't stop them from dumping Owen Sound 4-2, a bitter disappointment for the favoured Greys.

They had to wait five years for their next final appearance, which they earned in 2004–05 despite finishing fifth in the 10-team league. Surprisingly, they were considered the favourite in the final as their opponents, the Listowel Cyclones, had only finished seventh, 12 points behind Owen Sound. Again, that didn't matter as Listowel rolled to a 4-2 series win and a berth in the Sutherland Cup final. In a sad coincidence, the sixth and final game had been played on March 28, 2005—the anniversary of the Greys' two Memorial Cup wins.

Since then, there's been little for Greys fans to cheer about. The team finished ninth out of 10 teams in 2005–06 and missed the Junior B playoffs for the first time since 1978–79. It appears Owen Sound will be on the sidelines again this spring as the club is headed for a finish of ninth and last. Its record as of January 11, 2007, was 3–27–2–1.

The Owen Sound Sun Times newspaper reported on January 11, 2007, that leading scorer Greg Virgo has been traded to Cambridge and teammate Mark England has been sent to Stratford. General manager Kevin Emke said both players had reportedly asked to be dealt to playoff-bound clubs, requests that had caused friction in the dressing room. Team captain Sean Dinsmore was also on the way out, reportedly bound for the Collingwood Blues.

=== Part-time in Port Elgin (2000–2006) ===

Sporting a good contingent of players from the Port Elgin area, the Greys decided to stage a handful of home games at the new Saugeen Shores Community Complex in that town during the 1999–2000 season. The games were very well attended, with average crowds of about 800 people, far more than were coming to games at the Bayshore Community Centre in Owen Sound.

Starting with the 2000–01 season, the Greys played half of their home games at "The Plex," as the building became known. The team's name was also changed, first to the Owen Sound-Saugeen Greys in 2000 and then to the Owen Sound-Saugeen Shores Greys in 2001.

As the number of Port Elgin-based players dwindled, so did attendance. The Greys decided in 2006 to abandon Port Elgin and return to Owen Sound on a full-time basis. The name was also changed back to the traditional Owen Sound Greys. Since the Greys had such a rough time in the past seasons they decided to take a year off for the 2009–10 season

=== 2009–10 season ===
The Greys folded their team for the 2009–10 season, citing financial restructuring.

=== 2010–11 season ===
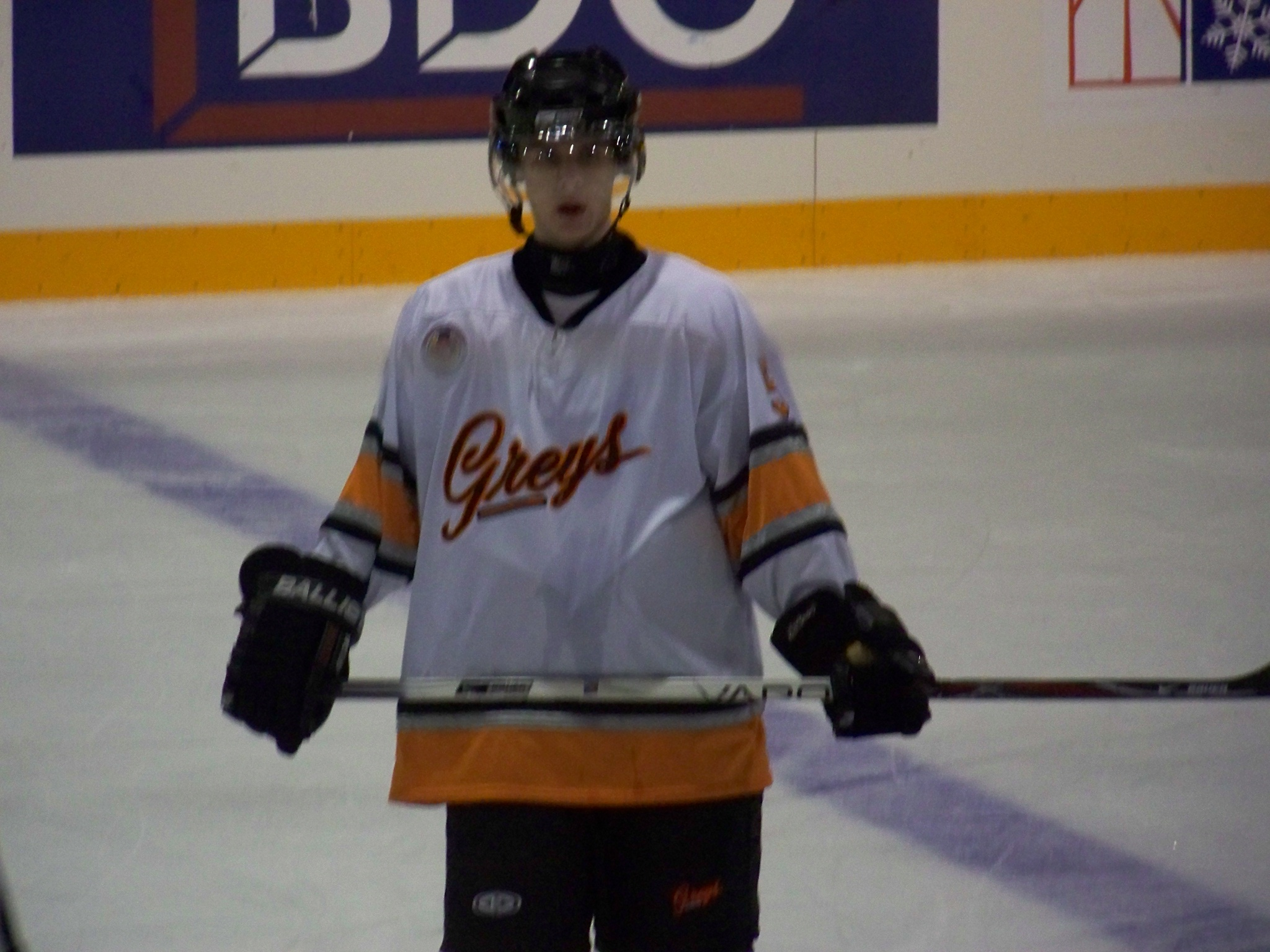
Owen Sound Grey's Player 2010-2011 Season

After a year hiatus, the Greys returned and started the rebuilding process. Players bought into the rebuilding process and left the Greys with a solid nucleus to build on for next season.

=== 2011–12 season ===
After a much better season performance-wise, it was announced that the Greys franchise had been awarded to David Arseneaut, the team's major sponsor, by the OHA despite the team being community owned. On April 25, 2012, the OHA announced its approval of Arseneault's plan to relocate the team to Brampton, Ontario. This ends the long tradition of OHA Junior hockey in Owen Sound one season shy of what would be its centennial.

== Season-by-season record ==
=== The current franchise (1973–present) ===
Season	GP	W	L	T	OTL	GF	GA	P	Results	Playoffs
1973–74	28	20	5	3	-	168	98	43	1st NJDHL	Lost Super C Final
1974–75	29	2	26	1	-	86	233	5	6th CJCHL West	Lost Super C Final
1975–76	36	10	18	8	-	152	197	28	6th MOJBHL	Lost quarter-final
1976–77	40	14	23	3	-	163	195	31	5th MOJBHL	DNQ
1977–78	32	9	23	3	-	164	208	21	5th MOJBHL	DNQ
1978–79	42	16	23	3	-	229	271	35	5th MWJBHL	DNQ
1979–80	42	13	22	7	-	203	209	33	6th MWJBHL	Lost quarter-final
1980–81	42	26	16	0	-	210	186	52	3rd MWJBHL	Lost quarter-final
1981–82	42	12	29	1	-	197	249	25	6th MWJBHL	Lost quarter-final
1982–83	42	15	27	0	-	190	265	30	6th MWJBHL	Lost quarter-final
1983–84	42	20	22	0	-	212	235	40	4th MWJBHL	Lost semifinal
1984–85	42	22	17	3	-	266	189	47	4th MWJBHL	Lost semifinal
1985–86	50	25	20	5	-	254	232	55	3rd OJHL	Lost final
1986–87	42	26	12	4	-	263	211	56	1st OJHL	Won league
1987–88	48	24	24	0	-	260	246	48	4th MWJBHL	Lost semifinal
1988–89	48	20	23	5	-	249	256	45	4th MWJBHL	Lost semifinal
1989–90	48	34	13	1	-	334	208	69	2nd MWJBHL	Lost semifinal
1990–91	48	25	22	1	-	250	227	51	5th MWJBHL	Lost quarter-final
1991–92	48	28	15	5	-	258	195	61	4th MWJBHL	Lost semifinal
1992–93	48	33	14	1	-	311	217	67	2nd MWJBHL	Lost semifinal
1993–94	48	21	26	1	-	198	201	43	6th MWJBHL	Lost quarter-final
1994–95	48	20	24	4	-	237	236	44	7th MWJBHL	Lost quarter-final
1995–96	48	28	16	4	-	261	196	60	6th MWJBHL	Lost final
1996–97	48	15	31	2	-	183	252	32	8th MWJBHL	Lost quarter-final
1997–98	48	27	19	2	-	248	179	56	6th MWJBHL	Lost quarter-final
1998–99	48	19	22	7	-	207	203	45	7th MWJBHL	Lost quarter-final
1999–2000	48	32	14	2	-	236	176	66	4th MWJBHL	Lost final
2000–01	48	36	11	1	-	232	141	73	1st MWJBHL	Lost semifinal
2001–02	48	29	14	5	-	195	164	63	4th MWJBHL	Lost semifinal
2002–03	48	24	20	4	0	199	185	52	5th MWJBHL	Lost semifinal
2003–04	48	28	16	3	1	190	136	60	3rd MWJBHL	Lost quarter-final
2004–05	48	29	15	3	1	179	130	62	5th MWJBHL	Lost final
2005–06	48	14	32	2	-	146	198	30	9th MWJBHL	DNQ
2006–07	48	3	39	4	2	124	291	12	9th MWJBHL	DNQ
2007–08	48	8	37	2	1	116	219	19	9th GOJHL-MW	DNQ
2008–09	52	6	44	-	2	107	326	14	9th GOJHL-MW	DNQ
2009–10	Did not participate									
2010–11	51	4	44	-	3	134	400	11	9th GOJHL-MW	DNQ
2011–12	51	9	39	-	3	150	279	21	9th GOJHL-MW	DNQ

=== Playoffs ===
- 1986 Lost semi-final

Markham Waxers defeated Owen Sound Greys 4-games-to-1

- 1987 Won league, lost OHA Buckland Cup

Owen Sound Greys defeated Markham Waxers 4-games-to-1
Owen Sound Greys defeated Aurora Eagles 4-games-to-none OJHL CHAMPIONS
Nickel Centre Power Trains (NOJHL) defeated Owen Sound Greys 4-games-to-2

== The original franchise ==
Owen Sound Greys
- City: Owen Sound, Ontario, Canada
- League: Southern Ontario Junior A Hockey League; Mid-Ontario Junior B Hockey League; Central Junior B Hockey League
- Operated: 1913-1977
- Home arena: Owen Sound Coliseum
- Colours: Orange, Black, and White

Franchise history
- 1977: Folded

Championships
- Playoff championships: 1924 & 1927 Memorial Cup Champions

=== History ===
The Greys had gone through numerous incarnations and leagues in the nearly 100 years since they were founded, although their initial history was cut short due to World War I. The team reformed after the end of the war and immediately came to prominence, winning the local playoff title in 1920 and thumping the Toronto champion 14-0. A year later, the Greys advanced to the Northern Hockey League playoff final.

Many early members of the team had attended Victoria Public School in Owen Sound, where principal Henry Kelso (for whom the city's Kelso Beach was named) had established a very strong school hockey program. Two of those Victoria graduates were forward Melville "Butch" Keeling, who later went on to star with the New York Rangers of the National Hockey League, and goaltender Hedley Smith. In the fall of 1923 they earned places in the Greys lineup; soon they and their team would also earn a permanent place in the history of Canadian hockey.

=== Memorial Cup glory ===
Keeling and Smith were joined by four other Owen Sound boys, including another soon-to-be NHLer named Edward "Teddy" Graham. Two others who later made the NHL, team captain Larry "Dutch" Cain and future Hockey Hall of Famer Ralph "Cooney" Weiland, were among the three imports on the nine-player squad. The 1923-24 season began in December and would end less than four months later with the Greys crowned "Dominion Junior Hockey Champions," winners of what was then called the OHA Memorial Cup.

Owen Sound first captured the J. Ross Robertson Cup as Ontario Hockey Association titlists by defeating the Kitchener Greenshirts 12-7 in a two-game, total-goals series. That followed earlier playoff series wins over Collingwood, Midland and Toronto Varsity in which the Greys were not seriously challenged. Owen Sound's next hurdles were single-game playoffs against North Bay of the Northern Ontario Hockey Association and Montreal Westmount. The club was then pitted against the Kenora Thistles in the Eastern Canadian final, a two-game, total-goals series won 15-12 by the Greys.

The Greys had journeyed to Winnipeg for the first game against the Thistles (Game 2 was in Kenora) and they returned to the Manitoba capital to face the Calgary Canadians in the two-game, total-goals national final. Keeling and Weiland each scored twice and Fred Elliott scored once in the first game, won 5-3 by Owen Sound. Weiland and Elliott both scored again two days later, on March 28, 1924, but the real hero was 16-year-old netminder Hedley Smith. Calgary peppered him with 23 third-period shots but he stopped every one of them and held Calgary to a 2–2 tie. The Greys won the series 7-5 and, with it, the Dominion title.

At the time, the wire service provided the only method of transmitting the results back to Owen Sound. Bulletins were posted outside the office of the city's newspaper, which estimated that more than 5,000 fans were there during the last game. It's believed that about 8,000 people turned out to welcome the champions home four days later, a remarkable number considering Owen Sound's population was only about 12,000 at the time.

The Greys went 22–2–2 that season, scoring 204 goals and allowing 69. Weiland led the club with 68 goals in 26 games, while Keeling added 37 goals and 46 points in 15 playoff games.

The 1924 Memorial Cup and J. Ross Robertson Cup champion Owen Sound Greys

A repeat was not to be, as Owen Sound fell to Toronto Aura Lee in the 1925 OHA final. The Greys also lost the next year to Queen's University, although both Toronto and Queen's fell in their respective national final series. It remained to the Greys to bring the Memorial Cup back to Ontario; in 1927 they reclaimed it as well as the OHA, all-Ontario and Eastern Canadian crowns.

Their opponents included the Newmarket Redmen, who fell 7-3 in a two-game, total-goals series to decide the OHA title. That set up a best-of-three national final in Toronto against the Port Arthur West End club. The Game 1 hero was Martin Lauder, a native of nearby Durham, Ontario, and a future NHLer who scored a natural hat trick as Owen Sound won 5-4. Game 2 was tied 2-2 after regulation time, which was followed by a 10-minute, non-sudden death overtime. The Greys outscored Port Arthur 3-1 in the extra frame, won the game 5-3 and became the first team to win the Memorial Cup a second time. It happened on March 28, 1927—the third anniversary of the 1924 championship. Hedley Smith, who never went on to pro hockey, was the only holdover from that first title and thus became the first double Memorial Cup winner.

The OHA divided junior hockey into separate Junior A and Junior B ranks in 1933. The Greys were placed in Junior B, where they spent the next 42 years.

Artifacts from the 1924 championship have surfaced in recent years. Cufflinks presented to Cooney Weiland are part of a junior hockey exhibit at the Hockey Hall of Fame in Toronto. A gold watch given to Greys captain Dutch Cain on the team's return to Owen Sound is currently being auctioned online. The watch, which reportedly still keeps perfect time, is inscribed "Presented to L.J. Cain By The City of Owen Sound April 2nd 1924." The outer case has crossed hockey sticks and a puck, with "Dominion Champions" inscribed above and "Junior Hockey" below.

=== The Junior B years (1933–1975) ===
The Greys served as the farm team for the Owen Sound Trappers, who competed in the OHA's Intermediate A league in the late 1930s and early 1940s. This coincided with the team's next notable championship run, which went all the way to the OHA Junior B Sutherland Cup final in 1940. Owen Sound's opponent was the Waterloo Siskins, who won the best-of-five series 3-1 and claimed the first of their 11 OHA titles.

It was 21 years before the Greys again made it as far in the playoffs. In 1960-61, they finished first in the Central Junior B Hockey League and rolled to the championship by defeating the Hamilton Bees and the Siskins, avenging the 1940 loss. Owen Sound then eliminated the St. Marys Lincolns in a semifinal series but ran out of gas in the Sutherland Cup final against the St. Michael's Buzzers, losing in four straight games. To this day, the Greys have never made it back to the Sutherland Cup final.

The Greys were part of the Central Junior B league throughout the 1960s. They failed to make the playoffs between 1966 and 1968 but turned things around and finished first in 1969-70. They lost a semifinal playoff series to the Collingwood Blues, who went on to win the final over the Guelph CMC's, and thus began a great hockey rivalry that lasted into the 1980s and spanned four different leagues.

Owen Sound and Collingwood met up again in the Central league final in 1971 and the Blues, having already disposed of the Preston Raiders in a semifinal series, again prevailed. The Greys finished first for the second straight year and beat the Kitchener Ranger B's 4-3 in the other semifinal before falling to Collingwood in five games.

In 1971-72, the Greys and Blues were placed in the new Mid-Ontario Junior B Hockey League, along with the Orillia Travelways, the Barrie Colts, the Newmarket Redmen and the Bolton Bruins. Orillia finished first in schedule play but once again Owen Sound and Collingwood met in the championship round and once again the Blues came out on top, winning 4-3.

The 1972-73 season saw the Greys finish in second place but they swept the league playoffs, knocking off the Midland Flyers in four straight games and finally getting past Collingwood, also in the minimum four games. This Greys team featured future NHLer Jim Roberts. Owen Sound then beat the Burlington Mohawks of the Central league 4-2 and advanced to the OHA semifinals against the Toronto Nationals. The Metro Junior B Hockey League champions won a hard-fought series 4-3.

Owen Sound's best season in this stretch was 1973-74. The team finished first, just ahead of Collingwood, but a fifth straight playoff meeting between the rivals was not in store. The Greys instead dumped Barrie 4-1 and Midland 4-1 to claim their second straight Mid-Ontario league title, then needed six games to get past the Elmira Sugar Kings of the Southwestern Junior B Hockey League. Owen Sound was back in the Sutherland Cup semifinals against the Metro league champs but once again lost out in the seventh and deciding game, falling this time to the Bramalea Blues.

That didn't mean Owen Sound was necessarily out of the picture, though. Bramalea and the Hamilton Red Wings of the Niagara District faced off for the Ontario championship and the Blues won the first game, but the contest was marred by a donnybrook that involved players, officials and fans and resulted in 14 police officers being called to the arena. The Blues immediately forfeited the series and incoming OHA president Cliffe Phillips decided to allow the Greys to return to action and take Bramalea's place in the final against Hamilton. Phillips soon found that his notion was not a popular one and he dropped it at once; the Greys missed out on a trip to the OHA final after a 13-year absence and the Sutherland Cup was awarded to the Red Wings as Ontario champs.

The Greys wrapped up their third straight Mid-Ontario crown in 1974-75, beating first-place Collingwood 4-1 in the final. But the road ended in the OHA quarter-finals, where the Waterloo Siskins swept Owen Sound to the side. Bramalea, back in the mix a year after its forfeit, went on to win the Sutherland Cup. More than 30 years later, the Greys are still searching for their next Junior B league championship.

=== Tier II and Intermediate (1975–1982) ===
The club spent the next two years in the Southern Ontario Junior A Hockey League, but they were disappointing seasons. Owen Sound finished fifth and out of the playoffs in 1975-76, then placed fourth and last in 1976-77. All four teams advanced to the post-season that year but the Greys didn't last long, brushed aside in four straight games by the Guelph Platers.

When the SOJAHL folded in 1977, the Greys were left high and dry. They couldn't return to the Mid-Ontario Junior B league, as they had been replaced by another Owen Sound team which was called Owen Sound Grey-Bruce Salvage, popularly known as the Salvagemen. They took a one-year leave of absence, then returned to the ice in 1978-79 as a founding member of the new Georgian Bay Intermediate A Hockey League.

They again failed to recapture their previous glory, never finishing higher than third place and advancing to the playoff final only once. The Greys went on another hiatus in 1982, one year before the league itself disappeared.

=== Season-by-season results ===
Season	GP	W	L	T	OTL	GF	GA	P	Results	Playoffs
1953-54	30	9	18	3	-	121	178	21	7th OHA Gr.	
1954-55	30	12	15	3	-	155	116	27	4th CJBHL	
1955-56	27	18	9	0	-	178	113	36	2nd CJBHL	
1956-57	27	19	7	1	-	193	101	39	2nd CJBHL	
1957-58	29	15	13	1	-	160	134	31	4th CJBHL	
1958-59	30	20	9	1	-	203	124	41	2nd CJBHL	
1959-60	30	21	9	0	-	--	--	44	1st CJBHL	
1960-61	29	22	5	2	-	186	117	48	1st CJBHL	Won league
1961-62	29	11	18	0	-	137	154	24	3rd CJBHL	
1962-63	36	22	12	2	-	216	162	46	1st CJBHL	
1963-64	36	19	17	0	-	196	168	38	3rd CJBHL	
1964-65	42	18	23	1	-	188	183	37	5th CJBHL	
1965-66	39	6	33	0	-	143	304	12	6th CJBHL	
1966-67	32	3	28	1	-	120	279	7	5th CJBHL	
1967-68	39	7	26	6	-	158	251	20	6th CJBHL	
1968-69	36	16	14	6	-	157	161	38	4th CJBHL	
1969-70	40	30	6	4	-	270	158	64	1st CJBHL	
1970-71	41	28	11	2	-	171	108	58	1st CJBHL	Lost final
1971-72	40	26	12	2	-	255	177	54	2nd CJBHL	Lost final
1972-73	40	24	13	3	-	222	157	51	2nd MOJBHL	Won league
1973-74	40	30	6	4	-	274	147	64	1st MOJBHL	Won league
1974-75	40	23	11	6	-	229	157	52	2nd MOJBHL	Won league
1975-76	60	23	32	5	-	272	339	51	5th SOJAHL	DNQ
1976-77	37	10	22	5	-	167	246	25	4th SOJAHL	Lost semi-final

=== Playoffs ===
- 1976 DNQ
- 1977 Lost semi-final

Guelph Platers defeated Owen Sound Greys 4-games-to-2 with 1 tie

== Intermediate A ==
Owen Sound Greys
- City: Owen Sound, Ontario, Canada
- League: Major Intermediate A Hockey League; Georgian Bay Intermediate A Hockey League
- Operated: 1978-1982
- Home arena: Owen Sound Coliseum
- Colours: Orange, Black, and White

Franchise history
- 1982: Folded

Season	GP	W	L	T	OTL	GF	GA	P	Results	Playoffs
1978-79	36	14	22	1	-	n/a	n/a	29	3rd GBIAHL	Lost semifinal
1979-80	36	10	24	2	-	n/a	n/a	22	7th GBIAHL	DNQ
1980-81	36	20	15	1	-	214	168	41	3rd MIAHL	Lost final
1981-82	36	11	23	2	-	200	263	24	6th MIAHL	Lost semifinal

== Championships ==
- Memorial Cup Dominion Junior Hockey Champions: 1924, 1927
- Eastern Canadian Junior Hockey Champions: 1924, 1927
- J. Ross Robertson Cup OHA Junior Hockey Champions: 1924, 1927
- Frank L. Buckland Trophy OHA Junior A Hockey League Champions: 1987
- Mid-Ontario Junior B Hockey League Champions: 1973, 1974, 1975
- Central Junior B Hockey League Champions: 1961

=== Sutherland Cup appearances ===
1961: St. Michael's Buzzers defeated Owen Sound Greys 4-games-to-none

=== George S. Dudley Trophy Super "C" Appearances ===
1974: Woodstock Navy-Vets defeated Owen Sound Salvagemen 4-games-to-none
1975: Woodstock Navy-Vets defeated Owen Sound Salvagemen 3-games-to-none

== Arenas ==
- Riverside Arena, 1st Avenue A West, Owen Sound (unknown-1938)
- Owen Sound Arena, 2nd Avenue East, Owen Sound (1938-1982)
- Owen Sound Coliseum, 1400 7th Avenue East, Owen Sound (1982-1983)
- J.D. McArthur Arena, Harry Lumley Bayshore Community Centre, 1900 3rd Avenue East, Owen Sound (1983–Present)
- Saugeen Shores Community Complex, 600 Tomlinson Drive, Port Elgin (2000-2006)

== Affiliations ==
Since the Ontario Hockey League moved into Owen Sound in 1989, the Greys have enjoyed an almost continuous affiliation with the big club (originally the Owen Sound Platers, now known as the Owen Sound Attack).

A disagreement in 1999 led the Platers to cancel the arrangement and affiliate instead with the OPJHL's ill-fated Durham Huskies. Although that ended after one season and the Platers again latched on to the Greys, there was enough animosity between the Greys and Huskies to fuel two heated exhibition games one week apart prior to the 2000-01 season. Owen Sound won 5-1 in the first game and 5-0 in the second game, which was marred by a line brawl toward the end.

The Greys had another affiliation with the Kincardine Bulldogs of the Western Junior C Hockey League. This affiliation ended when the Greys took a leave of absence in 2009.

In 2010 it was announced that the Greys would return as affiliates to the Villanova Knights of the Ontario Junior Hockey League and the Fergus Devils of the Georgian Mid-Ontario Junior C Hockey League.

Getting back to hometown roots for the 2011 season, the Greys announced their affiliation with the Hanover Barons of the Western Ontario Junior C Hockey League

== In Memory ==
The Greys have recently mourned the deaths of their two longest-serving club presidents.

=== Carl Fairman ===
Fairman was with the Greys for 25 years, the last 20 as president, until his death on January 12, 2004, at age 68. Fundraising was his strong point and he was a regular and tireless fixture at the club's weekly bingo games.

- Carl Fairman, 1935-2004

=== Howard Hindman ===
Hindman died on January 10, 2007, at age 90. A prominent city businessman, sportsman and benefactor who served at various times as chair of the local hospital board, school board and police board and as honorary chair of the hospital foundation, he still found time for heavy involvement with numerous sporting organizations, including the Greys. Hindman held the post of team president and/or manager continuously between 1946 and 1986. A team jersey with his name on it was presented to him at a home game approximately four months before his death.

- Howard Hindman being honoured, September 2006

== NHL alumni ==
Numerous members of the Owen Sound Greys have gone on to play in the National Hockey League.

- Steve Baker
- Roy Burmister
- Bobby Burns
- Dutch Cain
- Patsy Callighen
- George Gee
- Ted Graham
- Benny Grant
- Alan Hepple
- Dean Hopkins
- Melville "Butch" Keeling
- Martin Lauder
- Jack Markle
- Chris Minard
- Brian Perry
- Jim Roberts
- Curtis Sanford
- Jim Schoenfeld
- Brad Tiley
- Norm Tustin
- Cooney Weiland

- Fred Elliott
- Norm Locking
