= Fred Elliott (ice hockey) =

Canadian ice hockey player

- Born: February 18, 1903 Clinton, Ontario, Canada
- Died: August 28, 1982 (aged 79)
- Height: 5 ft 8 in (173 cm)
- Weight: 165 lb (75 kg; 11 st 11 lb)
- Position: Right wing
- Shot: Right
- Played for: Ottawa Senators
- Playing career: 1923–1931

Frederick Henry "Fred" Elliott (February 18, 1903 – August 28, 1982) was a Canadian professional ice hockey winger.

== Early life ==
Elliott was born in Clinton, Ontario. Elliott played junior hockey with the Owen Sound Greys, where he was a teammate of Cooney Weiland, and the Minneapolis Millers.

He played minor league hockey with the Toronto Ravinas during the 1927–1928 season.

== Career ==
Elliott played 43 games in the National Hockey League with the Ottawa Senators during the 1928–29 season. The rest of his career, which lasted from 1927 to 1931, was spent in various minor leagues.

== Career statistics ==
=== Regular season and playoffs ===
			Regular season					Playoffs
Season	Team	League	GP	G	A	Pts	PIM	GP	G	A	Pts	PIM
1927–28	Toronto Falcons	Can-Pro	42	9	7	16	14	2	0	0	0	0
1928–29	Ottawa Senators	NHL	43	2	0	2	6	—	—	—	—	—
1929–30	Windsor Bulldogs	IHL	3	0	1	1	4	—	—	—	—	—
1929–30	London Panthers	IHL	5	1	0	1	16	—	—	—	—	—
1929–30	Niagara Falls Cataracts	IHL	33	2	5	7	10	—	—	—	—	—
1930–31	Philadelphia Arrows	Can-Am	13	1	2	3	11	—	—	—	—	—
1930–31	Stratford Nationals	OPHL	1	0	0	0	0	—	—	—	—	—
1930–31	London Tecumsehs	IHL	19	0	1	1	0	—	—	—	—	—
IHL totals			60	3	7	10	30	—	—	—	—	—
NHL totals			43	2	0	2	6	—	—	—	—	—
