= 1976 Philadelphia Flyers–Red Army game =

US–Soviet Union ice hockey game

Flyers–Red Army game
	1	2	3	Total
Red Army	0	1	0	1
Philadelphia Flyers	2	1	1	4
- Date: January 11, 1976
- Arena: Spectrum
- City: Philadelphia, Pennsylvania, U.S.
- Attendance: 17,007

The Flyers–Red Army game was a famous international ice hockey game played on January 11, 1976, between the Philadelphia Flyers of the North America–based National Hockey League (NHL), and HC CSKA Moscow (Central Sports Club of the Army Moscow, Russian: ХК ЦСКА Москва, also known as the "Red Army Team", as all players were superficially members of the Soviet Army) of the Soviet Union.

The game was notable for an incident where, after a body check delivered by the Flyers' Ed Van Impe, CSKA's top player, Valeri Kharlamov, was prone on the ice for a minute. When officials did not call a penalty, the Red Army coach, Konstantin Loktev, pulled his team off the ice in protest. Flyers' Chairman Ed Snider told CSKA to return to the ice and finish the game, which was being broadcast to an international audience, or the Soviet Hockey Federation would not get paid the fee to which they were entitled. However, according to NHL President Clarence Campbell, he denied he ever told Koloskov or Loktev about the money. Campbell said "Somebody on the periphery mentioned it, that's all." They eventually complied and lost 4–1. The Flyers were the only NHL team that managed to defeat the Red Army that year.

== Background ==
HC CSKA Moscow was one of the most dominant sports teams in history, winning the Soviet championship for 13 consecutive years between 1977 and 1989. CSKA played many games against NHL clubs, including a North American tour in 1975 and 1976. In total, the Red Army Club played 36 games against NHL teams from 1975 to 1991 and finished with a record of 26 wins, eight losses, and two ties.

The 1975–76 series between various NHL teams and two touring Soviet teams, the powerhouse Red Army team and the somewhat lesser Soviet Wings squad, was another pivotal moment in the tenuous relations between the NHL and the Soviet hockey program. The games, like the subsequent Canada Cup Tournaments which also began in 1976, were not treated like exhibitions. Coming into the final match of their NHL series, the Red Army was still undefeated, having tied the Montreal Canadiens 3-3 and beaten the other NHL teams they faced (the Rangers 7-3, and the Bruins 5-2). Their final game was to be played in the Spectrum in Philadelphia against the two-time defending Stanley Cup champion Flyers. Both Soviet teams were supplemented by other All Stars from their league.

Before CSKA had arrived in Philadelphia, the Soviet players and hockey leaders were aware of the rough reputation of the "Broad Street Bullies." A Pravda cartoon had portrayed the Flyers as Neanderthal thugs wielding clubs instead of sticks. Flyers captain Bobby Clarke's reputation was already cemented due partly to his actions in the 1972 Summit Series, where he delivered an infamous slash to the ankle of Valeri Kharlamov in Game Six.

Flyers owner Ed Snider had several reasons to dislike the Soviets, in addition to Soviet-Western political tensions. Tough, often contentious, negotiations took place with Soviet officials before the series became a reality, in which Snider was actively involved. The Flyers' owner found his patience tried by the difficult negotiating process with the Soviet officials. (Snider was criticized by some as being hypocritical for allowing his hockey team to participate in a series that would pump money into Soviet coffers.) Finally, there were strictly hockey-related reasons for Snider to dislike the Soviets so strongly. The diametrically opposite styles of hockey practiced by the Flyers and Red Army Team created an instant source of conflict. Although the Flyers of the mid-1970s were actually a very skilled team (with the likes of future Hall of Famers Bobby Clarke, Bill Barber, and Bernie Parent plus all-star caliber talents such as Reggie Leach, Rick MacLeish, and defensive defenseman Jimmy Watson), they were best known for their aggressive brand of physical play. Snider's competitive fires were stoked by the realization that the chance to play the Soviets represented a chance to prove that his club was the best team in the world and much more than a "goon squad."

== The game ==
A goodwill get-together before the game was fraught with tension. Flyers announcer Gene Hart, who spoke Russian, taught Flyers owner Ed Snider to say a phrase in Russian wishing the best for both teams in the upcoming game. When the time came, there was no mingling whatsoever between the Soviet contingent and Flyers staff and players. When Snider took to the podium, he spoke tersely and omitted the phrase Hart had taught him. Snider later said, "when I looked at all those cold faces, I just couldn't do it." Clarke later said that he, too, "really hated those bastards" on the Soviet side and could not wait to take to the ice against them once again.

The Flyers dictated the game's tempo and were able to take the body on the Soviet players and avoid getting caught in the Soviet up-tempo transition game. In the first period, with the game still scoreless, Flyers defenseman Ed Van Impe, who had just finished serving a penalty for hooking, left the box and immediately placed a hard hit that knocked out CSKA star Valeri Kharlamov. Kharlamov lay prone on the ice for a minute. Lloyd Gilmour, the referee, refused to call a penalty, maintaining that Van Impe's check was clean. He did call a delay of game penalty to the Red Army bench, and head coach Loktev protested by pulling the team from the ice. This memorably led to commentator Bob Cole saying, "They're going home!" repeatedly. Snider got into a shouting match with the president of the Soviet Hockey Federation, threatening to not pay for the series if they did not return to the ice. The Soviets prolonged the game stoppage by arguing to make their return to the ice conditional on the referee canceling their impending delay of game bench penalty. Eventually, they accepted the penalty and came back to the ice.

The game delay tactic backfired on them as they returned to find the Flyers even more resolute than before. The Flyers scored quickly after play resumed and never looked back. One key contribution to the Flyers win was a technical decision made by Flyer head coach Fred Shero, to stand up the Red Army attack at the Flyers defensive blue line rather than just back off the line, which caught the Red Army off guard since no other NHL team had tried this tactic. The Flyers ending up outshooting the Red Army 49–13 en route to their 4–1 victory.

Soviet referee Yury Karandin officiated the game as a linesman.

== After the game ==
Flyers head coach Fred Shero jokingly told low-scoring defenseman Joe Watson that he had set the Soviet hockey program back 25 years by scoring a shorthanded goal on the great Vladislav Tretiak. Amidst the Flyers' pride in their convincing victory against an outstanding team, the seeds of contentiousness had grown even further. To this day, Tretiak, who views the tie game in the Montreal Forum as the highpoint of the series, says that the Flyers won by playing "rude hockey". Coach Loktev called the Flyers "a bunch of animals." The Flyers, meanwhile, left with the belief that the Soviet team had confirmed their feelings that Russian players were skilled but soft.

Milt Dunnell of the Toronto Star had written this comment after the close of the series: "The Moscow Musketeers had to put a big fat zero on their aptitude test by pulling one of the dumbest tricks in sports. They hauled their team off the ice. Loktev knew the conditions before he came. Nobody loves playing in Philadelphia. Once he accepted a game with the Flyers, under NHL rules, with an NHL referee, he was in the same boat as the Toronto Maple Leafs or Vancouver Canucks when they come to town. Loktev wanted his team to know what's it's like to play the Flyers in Philly under NHL conditions. Well... that's what it's like."

== Legacy ==
A little more than a decade after the showdown in the Spectrum, the Soviet Union was crumbling politically. In order to raise funds, the Soviet hockey program started to negotiate to auction off selected prominent national team veterans to be dispersed to NHL teams. The Sniders refused to get the Flyers involved in seeking to acquire any Soviet players, citing the fact that the Soviet officials were demanding a large portion of the players' NHL salaries be diverted into their hands rather than being given to the players. Eventually, the Flyers would scout and draft players from the Soviet Union and its successor states on the same basis as they did players from any other hockey country.

In a 1993 Halloween episode, The Simpsons depicted the team as demons in Hell, serving on the "Jury of the Damned".

== See also ==
- Canada Cup
- CSKA Moscow
- Summit Series
- Super Series
- Super Series '76
- Super Series '76-77
