= Jim Roberts (ice hockey, born 1956) =

Canadian ice hockey player

- Born: June 8, 1956 (age 68); Toronto, Ontario, Canada
- Height: 6 ft 1 in (185 cm)
- Weight: 195 lb (88 kg; 13 st 13 lb)
- Position: Left wing
- Shot: Left
- Played for: Minnesota North Stars
- NHL draft: 31st overall, 1976; Minnesota North Stars
- WHA draft: 34th overall, 1976; Houston Aeros
- Playing career: 1976–1980

James Drew Roberts (born June 8, 1956) is a Canadian former professional ice hockey player. He played 106 games in the National Hockey League with the Minnesota North Stars between 1976 and 1979. The rest of his career, which lasted from 1976 to 1980, was spent in various minor leagues.

== Career ==
Born in Toronto, Roberts grew up in Proton Station, Ontario (now a part of Southgate) near Flesherton, Ontario. He attended Grey Highlands Secondary School and played hockey for local teams until he was old enough to move up to Junior B hockey.

Roberts's junior hockey career started with the 1972–73 Owen Sound Greys of the Mid-Ontario Junior B Hockey League. With the help of Roberts, the Greys won their league championship. The Greys eventually came within a win of defeating the Toronto Nationals, which would have given them the chance to win the Sutherland Cup as provincial champions. The next season saw him move up to the Ottawa 67's of the Ontario Major Junior Hockey League. In three seasons with the 67's, Roberts tabulated 62 goals and 176 points in 188 regular seasons games.

In 1976, after three seasons with the 67's, Roberts was drafted 31st overall by the Minnesota North Stars in the 1976 NHL Amateur Draft. The same year, Roberts was also drafted 34th overall by the Houston Aeros in the 1976 WHA Amateur Draft. Roberts started the 1976–77 season off in the American Hockey League with the New Haven Nighthawks, but after ten games was brought up to play with the Stars for the rest of the season. Roberts split the 1977–78 season between the North Stars and the Central Hockey League's Fort Worth Texans and split the 1978–79 season between the North Stars and the CHL's Oklahoma City Stars. At the end of the season, the North Stars left Roberts unprotected and he was picked up by the Winnipeg Jets in the 1979 NHL Expansion Draft; however, he never played another game in the National Hockey League. In 106 National Hockey League games, Roberts scored 17 goals and had 23 assists with 33 penalty minutes, all with the Minnesota North Stars.

In 1979–80, Roberts jumped from the Tulsa Oilers to the Cincinnati Stingers of the CHL and Maine Mariners of the AHL before retiring from professional hockey at the end of the season. Afterwards, he returned to the Flesherton area and played senior hockey for the Ontario Hockey Association's Durham Huskies for several years. He was also added to the Cambridge Hornets roster in February 1983 and was a valuable contributor to the team winning the 1982-83 Allan Cup.

== Career statistics ==
=== Regular season and playoffs ===
			Regular season					Playoffs
Season	Team	League	GP	G	A	Pts	PIM	GP	G	A	Pts	PIM
1972–73	Owen Sound Greys	MOJHL	—	—	—	—	—	—	—	—	—	—
1973–74	Ottawa 67's	OHA	64	13	18	31	44	7	2	0	2	2
1974–75	Ottawa 67's	OMJHL	60	22	40	62	58	7	0	0	0	0
1975–76	Ottawa 67's	OMJHL	64	27	56	83	62	12	3	9	12	6
1976–77	Minnesota North Stars	NHL	53	11	8	19	14	2	0	0	0	0
1976–77	New Haven Nighthawks	AHL	10	7	3	10	6	—	—	—	—	—
1977–78	Minnesota North Stars	NHL	42	4	14	18	19	—	—	—	—	—
1977–78	Fort Worth Texans	CHL	33	15	7	22	12	—	—	—	—	—
1978–79	Minnesota North Stars	NHL	11	2	1	3	0	—	—	—	—	—
1978–79	Oklahoma City Stars	CHL	66	21	22	43	34	—	—	—	—	—
1979–80	Maine Mariners	AHL	48	17	16	33	22	9	1	2	3	0
1979–80	Tulsa Oilers	CHL	2	0	0	0	0	—	—	—	—	—
1979–80	Cincinnati Stingers	CHL	26	8	10	18	11	—	—	—	—	—
NHL totals			106	17	23	40	33	2	0	0	0	0
