= Yury Karandin =

Russian ice hockey official and administrator (born 1937)

- Born: 22 March 1937 (age 89); Novosibirsk, Soviet Union
- Occupation: President of the Siberia–Far East branch of the Ice Hockey Federation of Russia
- Known for: International ice hockey referee
- Awards: IIHF Hall of Fame; Russian Hockey Hall of Fame

Yury Pavlovich Karandin (Russian: Карандин, Юрий Павлович; born 22 March 1937) is a Russian retired ice hockey referee, and an active ice hockey administrator as of 2018.

Karandin officiated for 26 seasons in the Soviet Union, and was selected by the International Ice Hockey Federation (IIHF) to referee games at two Winter Olympic Games, and six Ice Hockey World Championships. He became the first Soviet referee chosen to officiate matches involving players from the National Hockey League, when assigned to the first Super Series. He later refereed at two Canada Cup events, and became president of the Siberia–Far East branch of the Ice Hockey Federation of Russia. In 2004, he was inducted into both the IIHF Hall of Fame, and the Russian Hockey Hall of Fame.

== Early life ==
Karandin was born 22 March 1937, in Novosibirsk. Before becoming a referee, he played for HC Dynamo Novosibirsk.

== Refereeing career ==
Karandin officiated 876 games within the Soviet Union ice hockey championships. He refereed matches in the Soviet Union for 26 seasons from 1961 to 1987, was named to the top ten list of the best Soviet Union referees 23 times, and refereed international matches from 1966 to 1987. He officiated at the 1972 Winter Olympics, the 1984 Winter Olympics, and six Ice Hockey World Championships in 1970, 1973, 1983, 1985, 1986, and 1987. Overall, he officiated 268 international games, which also included two IIHF World U20 Championships, and one IIHF World U18 Championship. Karandin was the first Soviet referee chosen to officiate matches involving players from the National Hockey League, when he was assigned to games in the Super Series '76. In total, he later worked four different Super Series, and two Canada Cups.

From the book Hockey Parallels

"I can only state the obvious: Canadians took all the best from Soviet hockey, we took all the worst from Canadian hockey."

— Yuri Karandin, 2010

Karandin authored the book Hockey Parallels released in 2010, which recounted his experiences in ice hockey, and included several games he considered memorable. He officiated the 1969 Soviet hockey championship game between HC CSKA Moscow and HC Spartak Moscow, where he disallowed a goal by CSKA at the end of the second period because the official timekeeper's watch had expired, although the scoreboard had one second remaining. CSKA coach Anatoly Tarasov delayed resuming the match for 40 minutes in protest, before an eventual 3–1 loss to Spartak.

In the Super Series '76, Karandin stated that he was "urgently summoned to Moscow to apply for a Canadian travel visa", and that Soviet administrators quickly excused him from domestic duties to travel abroad. He expressed gratefulness to Canadians for the opportunity which changed his destiny. He officiated the 28 December 1975 victory by CSKA over the New York Rangers, and received praise from Phil Esposito. He was a linesman in the CSKA New Year's Eve match versus the Montreal Canadiens, and the 1976 Philadelphia Flyers–Red Army game. During the series, Karandin earned $10,000, but experienced difficulties when transferring the money back to the Soviet Union.

== Administration career ==
Karandin was elected president of the Siberia–Far East branch of the Ice Hockey Federation of Russia in 1991. He is still active in the role as of 2018, and is also a member of the national federation's executive committee. He aims to improve lower levels of competition in the region, and grow youth ice hockey by improving the funding for schools, and coaching support. He has stated that the city of Khabarovsk is a historical strength in the region, but moving the Far East hockey branch offices further east to Vladivostok might endanger that role, despite growth in the latter city. He also wants to make improvements to the Ice Sports Palace Sibir in Novosibirsk, which is too old for the modern standards of hosting an Ice Hockey World Championship.

== Awards and honors ==
Karandin was presented with a golden diploma from the IIHF in 1987, in recognition of his service. In 2004, he was inducted into both the Russian Hockey Hall of Fame, and the IIHF Hall of Fame. He was honored by the IIHF during the 2004 Men's World Ice Hockey Championships. He also refereed a hockey legends game during the 2004 event, featuring former star players from Russia, Canada, Finland, Sweden, Slovakia and the Czech Republic. In 2014, he attended the opening of the Russian Hockey Hall of Fame museum in Moscow. In July 2018, Karandin was appointed an honorary vice-president of the Ice Hockey Federation of Russia.
