= Super Series '76-77 =

Super Series '76-77 was an ice hockey tournament, which saw the team from HC CSKA Moscow, also called the "Red Army" in English (as all players were superficially members of the Soviet Army), touring North America to play against teams from the World Hockey Association (WHA). The tournament was played from 27 December 1976 to 8 January 1977, in the middle of the regular schedules of the WHA and Soviet league.

== Results ==
Date	Red Army		WHA Team	
27 December 1976	Red Army	2	New England Whalers	5
28 December 1976	Red Army	7	Cincinnati Stingers	5
30 December 1976	Red Army	10	Houston Aeros	1
1 January 1977	Red Army	5	Indianapolis Racers	2
3 January 1977	Red Army	6	San Diego Mariners	3
5 January 1977	Red Army	3	Edmonton Oilers	2
6 January 1977	Red Army	3	Winnipeg Jets	2
8 January 1977	Red Army	1	Quebec Nordiques	6

== See also ==
- HC CSKA Moscow
- Super Series '76
- Super Series
