= Super Series '76 =

Ice hockey exhibitions

Super Series '76 was the first of the "Super Series" ice hockey exhibitions, which saw club teams from Soviet Championship League touring North America to play against teams from the National Hockey League (NHL). The games were played in late December 1975 through the early part of January 1976, in the middle of the regular schedules of the NHL and Soviet league.

== History ==
The series was groundbreaking in that Soviet club teams had never played against NHL teams. The games, like the subsequent Canada Cup tournaments which also began in 1976, were not treated like exhibitions. The 1976 Super Series were a veritable "clash of hockey titans", as they involved the best teams of each league including the reigning Soviet champions, HC CSKA Moscow (Central Sports Club of the Army Moscow), also called "The Red Army Club", and Krylya Sovetov Moscow (translated as Soviet Wings Moscow). Both Soviet teams were supplemented by other All-Stars from their league. NHL teams involved included the two-time defending Stanley Cup champions Philadelphia Flyers and soon-to-be 1976 champions Montreal Canadiens.

In the early games Red Army trounced the New York Rangers 7–3, while the Soviet Wings defeated the Pittsburgh Penguins 7–4. On New Year's Eve 1975, the Red Army was scheduled to play the Montreal Canadiens. The Red Army was the most dominant team in the Soviet League, while the Canadiens were the best team in the NHL as they would go on to win the Stanley Cup later that year. The game resulted in a 3–3 tie in a contest being notable for the performance of the Red Army's Vladislav Tretiak in net despite his team being outshot 38–13.

The series continued with the Buffalo Sabres dominating the Soviet Wings, winning 12–6, their only defeat in the series and the Wings coming back to beat the Chicago Black Hawks 4–2. After a scoreless first period, the Red Army defeated the Boston Bruins 5–2, and the Soviet Wings beat the Islanders 2–1.

In their final game, Red Army suffered a 4-1 loss at the hands of the defending two-time Stanley Cup champions, the Philadelphia Flyers. That game was notable as the Flyers completely dominated the game, even without having Hall of Fame goalie Bernie Parent available for the game. The gritty Flyers who were led by 3-time league MVP winner Bobby Clarke, great play by several Flyers including Rick MacLeish, Wayne Stephenson in goal, and even a shorthanded goal by light scoring defenseman Joe Watson. Also early in the game, Ed Van Impe delivered a hard hit on the CSKA's top player, Valeri Kharlamov, knocking Kharlamov prone on the ice for a minute, and the Soviet coach pulled his team from the ice in protest of the officials' ruling that the hit was a legal play, which cost them a delay of game penalty. Praise of the Flyers play came from all areas of North America, even from the Montreal Gazette sports writer Tim Burke "The Flyers salvage Canada's pride in her nation sport with a near perfect hockey masterpiece... It came as a glorious finale to Super Series '76...It was one of the most remarkable displays of preparedness, discipline and unflappability in the annals of sport and it elevated Flyers' Coach Fred Shero's systematic approach to the game beyond question. Super quiet Flyers Coach Fred Shero was quoted after the game: "Yes we are world champions. If they had won, they would have been world champions. We beat the hell out of a machine".

-At the end of the tour, the Red Army's final tally was 2-1-1 and the Soviet Wings finished 3–1. Red Fisher had this comment in the Montreal Star following the close of the series:

They were grand and talented visitors, but the Soviets do not represent a hockey season in this area - and should not. The Soviets won the series 5-2-1, but all of the dialogue in the wake of Philadelphia's awesome wipeout of the Red Army team focused on the Soviets' failure to beat the National Hockey League's best 3 teams. Their best was unable to beat our best, which makes the over-all results considerably less than important.

== Results ==
=== Red Army ===
- December 28, 1975: Red Army 7 New York Rangers 3
- December 31, 1975: Red Army 3 Montreal Canadiens 3
- January 8, 1976: Red Army 5 Boston Bruins 2
- January 11, 1976: Red Army 1 Philadelphia Flyers 4

=== Soviet Wings ===
- December 29, 1975: Soviet Wings 7 Pittsburgh Penguins 4
- January 4, 1976: Soviet Wings 6 Buffalo Sabres 12
- January 7, 1976: Soviet Wings 4 Chicago Black Hawks 2
- January 10, 1976: Soviet Wings 2 New York Islanders 1

== Officials ==
- Soviet referee Yury Karandin officiated the December 28, and the January 11 (as a linesman) Red Army matches. He also officiated the December 31 (as a linesman) Red Army match and the January 7 Soviet Wings match.
- Soviet referee Viktor Dombrovski officiated the Soviet Wings match of December 29, the Red Army match of January 8; and as a linesman, the Soviet Wings matches of January 4 and January 10.

== See also ==
- Aggie Kukulowicz, Canadian-born Russian language interpreter for the series
- HC CSKA Moscow
- 1976 Philadelphia Flyers–Red Army game
- Super Series '76-77
- Super Series
