= Dave Hrechkosy =

Canadian ice hockey player

- Born: November 1, 1951 Winnipeg, Manitoba, Canada
- Died: March 7, 2012 (aged 60)
- Height: 6 ft 2 in (188 cm)
- Weight: 210 lb (95 kg; 15 st 0 lb)
- Position: Left wing
- Shot: Left
- Played for: California Golden Seals; St. Louis Blues
- NHL draft: Undrafted
- Playing career: 1971–1980

David John Hrechkosy (November 1, 1951 — March 7, 2012) was a Canadian professional ice hockey forward who played 141 games in the National Hockey League (NHL) for the California Golden Seals and St. Louis Blues.

== Career statistics ==
=== Regular season and playoffs ===
| | | | Regular season | | | | | Playoffs |
| Season | Team | League | GP | G | A | Pts | PIM | GP | G | A | Pts | PIM |
|---|---|---|---|---|---|---|---|---|---|---|---|---|
| 1969–70 | West Kildonan North Stars | MJHL | 48 | 28 | 15 | 43 | 36 | — | — | — | — | — |
| 1970–71 | Winnipeg Jets | WCHL | 57 | 16 | 21 | 37 | 70 | 12 | 4 | 3 | 7 | 24 |
| 1971–72 | New Haven Blades | EHL | 75 | 31 | 34 | 65 | 66 | 7 | 4 | 5 | 9 | 16 |
| 19471–72 | Providence Reds | AHL | 7 | 3 | 0 | 3 | 2 | — | — | — | — | — |
| 1972–73 | Rochester Americans | AHL | 70 | 15 | 24 | 39 | 48 | 4 | 0 | 2 | 2 | 8 |
| 1973–74 | Salt Lake Golden Eagles | WHL | 78 | 36 | 35 | 71 | 58 | 5 | 2 | 1 | 3 | 10 |
| 1973–74 | California Golden Seals | NHL | 2 | 0 | 0 | 0 | 0 | — | — | — | — | — |
| 1974–75 | California Golden Seals | NHL | 72 | 29 | 14 | 43 | 25 | — | — | — | — | — |
| 1975–76 | Salt Lake Golden Eagles | CHL | 16 | 8 | 3 | 11 | 6 | — | — | — | — | — |
| 1975–76 | California Golden Seals | NHL | 38 | 9 | 5 | 14 | 14 | — | — | — | — | — |
| 1975–76 | St. Louis Blues | NHL | 13 | 3 | 3 | 6 | 0 | 3 | 1 | 0 | 1 | 2 |
| 1976–77 | Kansas City Blues | CHL | 45 | 9 | 12 | 21 | 4 | 10 | 3 | 3 | 6 | 0 |
| 1977–78 | Salt Lake Golden Eagles | CHL | 55 | 5 | 12 | 17 | 11 | — | — | — | — | — |
| 1978–79 | Saginaw Gears | IHL | 2 | 0 | 2 | 2 | 0 | — | — | — | — | — |
| 1978–79 | New Haven Nighthawks | AHL | 61 | 15 | 20 | 35 | 21 | 10 | 6 | 7 | 13 | 8 |
| 1979–80 | New Haven Nighthawks | AHL | 1 | 0 | 0 | 0 | 0 | — | — | — | — | — |
| NHL totals | | | 140 | 42 | 24 | 66 | 41 | 3 | 1 | 0 | 1 | 2 |
