= Mid-Ontario Junior B Hockey League =

The Mid-Ontario Junior B Hockey League was a Junior "B" ice hockey league based in Southern Ontario from 1970 to 1978. It were sanctioned by the Ontario Hockey Association and Canadian Amateur Hockey Association, and competed for the All-Ontario Junior "B" title, the Sutherland Cup.

== History ==
The league was formed in 1970, bringing aboard several Suburban Junior C Hockey League teams such as the Orillia Terriers, the Newmarket Redmen and the Bolton Bruins, the Midland Flyers and Streetsville Derbys, and the Burlington Mohawks from the Niagara District Hockey League. Additional Junior C teams such as the Oakville Blades, Hespeler Shamrocks and Milton Flyers joined in 1970. Other members were the Barrie Colts and the Oak Ridges Dynes.

In 1971, the Junior B leagues re-aligned themselves geographically, as the Collingwood Blues and Owen Sound Greys joined the Mid-Ontario junior B league, and the Oakville Blades, Milton Flyers, Burlington Mohawks, Hespeler Shamrocks and Streetsville Derbys moving to the Central Junior B.

The Owen Sound Greys made the jump to the Southern Ontario Junior A Hockey League in 1975 after 3 straight Mid-Ontario titles. In 1976, they were followed into the Southern Ontario A by the Collingwood Blues.

In 1978, a weakened Mid-Ontario league folded and the Orillia Terriers, Thornhill Thunderbirds, the Barrie Colts, and Oak Ridges Dynes joined the Central League.

== Teams ==
| Team | City | Joined | Left | Left for |
| Barrie Colts | Barrie | 1970 | 1978 | Joined CJBHL |
| Bolton Bruins | Bolton | 1970 | 1972 | Folded |
| Burlington Mohawks | Burlington | 1970 | 1971 | Joined CJBHL |
| Collingwood Blues | Collingwood | 1971 | 1976 | Joined SOJAHL |
| Downsview Boys Club | North York | 1970 | 1971 | Joined MetJHL |
| Hespeler Shamrocks | Hespeler | 1970 | 1971 | Joined CJBHL |
| Midland Athletics | Midland | 1972 | 1977 | Folded |
| Milton Merchants | Milton | 1970 | 1971 | Joined CJBHL |
| Newmarket Redmen | Newmarket | 1970 | 1975 | Joined OPJHL |
| Oak Ridges Dynes | Oak Ridges | 1975 | 1978 | Joined CJBHL |
| Oakville Blades | Oakville | 1970 | 1971 | Joined CJBHL |
| Orillia Terriers | Orillia | 1970 | 1978 | Joined CJBHL |
| Owen Sound Greys | Owen Sound | 1971 | 1975 | Joined SOJAHL |
| Owen Sound Salvagemen | Owen Sound | 1975 | 1978 | Joined MWJHL |
| Streetsville Derbys | Mississauga | 1970 | 1971 | Joined CJBHL |
| Thornhill Thunderbirds | Thornhill | 1975 | 1978 | Joined CJBHL |

== Playoff champions ==
| Year | Champion | Finalist | Result in Provincials |
| 1971 | Orillia Travelways | | Lost SC QF vs. Peterbourgh (E) |
| 1972 | Collingwood Blues | | Lost SC QF vs. Peterbourgh (E) |
| 1973 | Owen Sound Greys | | Lost SC SF vs. Toronto (Met) |
| 1974 | Owen Sound Greys | | Lost SC SF vs. Bramalea (Met) |
| 1975 | Owen Sound Greys | Collingwood Blues | Lost SC QF vs. Waterloo (WW) |
| 1976 | Collingwood Blues | | Lost SC Final vs. St. Marys (W) |
| 1977 | Oak Ridges Dynes | Thornhill Thunderbirds | Lost SC QF vs. Stratford (WW) |
| 1978 | Barrie Colts | Oak Ridges Dynes | Lost SC QF vs. Stratford (WW) |

== Regular season champions ==
| Season | Champion | Record | Points |
| 1970-71 | Orillia Travelways | 28-3-3-0 | 59 |
| 1971-72 | Orillia Travelways | 28-9-3-0 | 59 |
| 1972-73 | Collingwood Blues | 28-9-3-0 | 59 |
| 1973-74 | Owen Sound Greys | 30-6-4-0 | 64 |
| 1974-75 | Collingwood Blues | 27-8-4-0 | 58 |
| 1975-76 | Collingwood Blues | 25-7-4-0 | 54 |
| 1976-77 | Oak Ridges Dynes | 31-6-3-0 | 64 |
| 1977-78 | Oak Ridges Dynes | 20-7-5-0 | 45 |
