= Keith Hanson =

American ice hockey player (born 1957)

- Born: April 26, 1957 (age 69) Ada, Minnesota, U.S.
- Height: 6 ft 4 in (193 cm)
- Weight: 180 lb (82 kg; 12 st 12 lb)
- Position: Defense
- Shot: Left
- Played for: Calgary Flames
- National team: United States
- NHL draft: 145th overall, 1977; Minnesota North Stars
- Playing career: 1981–1985

Keith Francis Hanson (born April 26, 1957) is an American retired professional ice hockey defenseman. He played 25 games for the Calgary Flames of the National Hockey League during the 1983–84 season. He was drafted 145th overall by the Minnesota North Stars in the 1977 NHL Amateur Draft but was traded to the Flames in 1983 without playing a game for Minnesota. In his 25 games in the NHL, he scored two assists and racked up 77 penalty minutes. He also played for teams in the American Hockey League, the International Hockey League and the Central Hockey League. He retired in 1985.

== Career statistics ==
=== Regular season and playoffs ===
			Regular season					Playoffs
Season	Team	League	GP	G	A	Pts	PIM	GP	G	A	Pts	PIM
1973–74	Bemidji High School	HS-MN	—	—	—	—	—	—	—	—	—	—
1974–75	Bemidji High School	HS-MN	—	—	—	—	—	—	—	—	—	—
1975–76	Austin Mavericks	MidJHL	49	11	22	33	115	—	—	—	—	—
1976–77	Austin Mavericks	MidJHL	44	11	38	49	71	—	—	—	—	—
1977–78	Northern Michigan University	CCHA	34	16	15	31	77	—	—	—	—	—
1978–79	Northern Michigan University	CCHA	33	8	14	22	57	—	—	—	—	—
1979–80	Northern Michigan University	CCHA	38	2	13	15	74	—	—	—	—	—
1980–81	Northern Michigan University	CCHA	43	8	24	32	95	—	—	—	—	—
1981–82	Toledo Goaldiggers	IHL	82	7	37	44	185	13	1	3	4	23
1982–83	Birmingham South Stars	CHL	69	4	21	25	187	12	0	3	3	29
1983–84	Calgary Flames	NHL	25	0	2	2	77	—	—	—	—	—
1983–84	Colorado Flames	CHL	39	5	21	26	64	6	2	2	4	16
1984–85	Moncton Golden Flames	AHL	70	5	17	22	145	—	—	—	—	—
NHL totals			25	0	2	2	77	—	—	—	—	—

=== International ===
Year	Team	Event	GP	G	A	Pts	PIM
1977	United States	WJC	7	0	0	0	0
1983	United States	WC-B	7	0	2	2	0
Junior totals			7	0	0	0	0
Senior totals			7	0	2	2	0
