= 1987–88 NHL transactions =

The following is a list of all team-to-team transactions that have occurred in the National Hockey League during the 1987–88 NHL season. It lists what team each player has been traded to, signed by, or claimed by, and for which player(s) or draft pick(s), if applicable.

== Trades between teams ==
=== May ===
May 14, 1987	To Montreal Canadiens Alfie Turcotte	To Edmonton Oilers cash
May 22, 1987	To New Jersey Devils Jim Korn	To Buffalo Sabres Jan Ludvig
May 28, 1987	To St. Louis Blues Tony McKegney; Rob Whistle	To New York Rangers Bruce Bell; 4th-rd pick - 1988 entry draft (# 72 - Jaan Luik) future considerations^{1} (Jim Pavese)

1. Trade completed on October 23, 1987.

=== June ===
June 1, 1987	To New Jersey Devils Shayne Doyle	To Vancouver Canucks 12th-rd pick - 1987 entry draft (# 233 - Neil Eisenhut)
June 1, 1987	To Boston Bruins John Blum	To Washington Capitals 7th-rd pick - 1988 entry draft (# 144 - Brad Schlegel)
June 5, 1987	To St. Louis Blues Perry Turnbull	To Winnipeg Jets 5th-rd pick - 1987 entry draft (# 96 - Ken Gernander)
June 8, 1987	To Winnipeg Jets 5th-rd pick - 1988 entry draft (# 101 - Benoit LeBeau); 3rd-rd pick in 1989 entry draft (STL - # 55 - Denny Felsner)^{1}	To New York Rangers Brian Mullen; 10th-rd pick in 1987 entry draft (# 205 - Brett Barnett)
June 12, 1987	To Quebec Nordiques 9th-rd pick - 1987 entry draft (# 183 - Ladislav Tresl)	To Washington Capitals 12th-rd pick - 1987 entry draft (# 240 - Dan Brettschneider); 10th-rd pick in 1988 entry draft (# 192 - Mark Sorensen)
June 12, 1987	To Montreal Canadiens 2nd-rd pick - 1987 entry draft (# 33 - John LeClair); 5th-rd pick in 1988 entry draft (# 93 - Peter Popovic)	To St. Louis Blues 3rd-rd pick - 1987 entry draft (# 59 - Robert Nordmark); 2nd-rd pick in 1988 entry draft (WAS - # 41 - Wade Bartley)^{2}
June 13, 1987	To New Jersey Devils Tom Kurvers	To Buffalo Sabres 3rd-rd pick - 1987 entry draft (# 53 - Andrew MacVicar); 10th-rd pick in 1989 entry draft (# 194 - Mark Astley)
June 13, 1987	To Detroit Red Wings 2nd-rd pick - 1987 entry draft (# 41 - Bob Wilkie)	To Philadelphia Flyers Mark Laforest
June 13, 1987	To Minnesota North Stars 1st-rd pick - 1987 entry draft (# 6 - Dave Archibald); 3rd-rd pick in 1987 entry draft (# 48 - Kevin Kaminski)	To Los Angeles Kings 1st-rd pick - 1987 entry draft (# 4 - Wayne McBean)
June 13, 1987	To Quebec Nordiques Gaetan Duchesne; Alan Haworth; 1st-rd pick in 1987 entry draft (# 15 - Joe Sakic)	To Washington Capitals Dale Hunter; Clint Malarchuk
June 13, 1987	To Vancouver Canucks 5th-rd pick in 1987 entry draft (# 87 - Sean Fabian)	To Philadelphia Flyers 5th-rd pick in 1989 entry draft (EDM - # 92 - Peter White)^{2}
June 13, 1987	To Calgary Flames Ric Nattress	To St. Louis Blues 4th-rd pick - 1987 entry draft (# 82 - Andy Rymsha); 5th-rd pick in 1988 entry draft (# 105 - Dave LaCouture)
June 13, 1987	To New Jersey Devils David Maley	To Montreal Canadiens 3rd-rd pick - 1987 entry draft (# 44 - Mathieu Schneider)

1. Winnipeg's' third-round pick went to St. Louis as the result of a trade on June 17, 1989, that sent Greg Paslawski and St. Louis's third-round pick in 1989 entry draft to Winnipeg in exchange for Winnipeg's second-round pick in 1991 entry draft and this pick.
2. St. Louis' second-round pick went to Washington as the result of a trade on December 11, 1987, that sent Paul Cavallini to St. Louis in exchange for Washington's option of St. Louis' second-round pick in 1988 entry draft or 1989 entry draft. Washington selected in the 1988 entry draft.
3. Vancouver's fifth-round pick was re-acquired as the result of a trade on March 1, 1988, that sent Willie Huber to Philadelphia in exchange for Paul Lawless and this pick.
  Vancouver's fifth-round pick then went to Edmonton as the result of a trade on March 7, 1989, that sent Greg Adams and Doug Smith to Vancouver in exchange for John LeBlanc and this pick.

=== July ===
July 21, 1987	To Philadelphia Flyers cash	To New York Rangers Jeff Brubaker

=== August ===
August 26, 1987	To Calgary Flames Brad McCrimmon	To Philadelphia Flyers 3rd-rd pick - 1988 entry draft (# 63 - Dominic Roussel); 1st-rd pick - 1989 entry draft (TOR - # 21 - Steve Bancroft)
August 27, 1987	To Washington Capitals Peter Sundstrom	To New York Rangers 5th-rd pick - 1988 entry draft (# 99 - Martin Bergeron)
August 31, 1987	To Vancouver Canucks Darren Jensen; Daryl Stanley	To Philadelphia Flyers Wendell Young; 3rd-rd pick - 1990 entry draft (# 44 - Kimbi Daniels)

1. Philadelphia's first-round pick went to Toronto as the result of a trade on March 6, 1989, that sent Ken Wregget to Philadelphia in exchange for Philadelphia's first-round pick (# 12 overall) in 1989 entry draft and this pick.

=== September ===
September 3, 1987	To Toronto Maple Leafs Ed Olczyk; Al Secord	To Chicago Blackhawks Bob McGill; Steve Thomas; Rick Vaive
September 8, 1987	To Toronto Maple Leafs Dave Semenko	To Hartford Whalers Bill Root
September 8, 1987	To Minnesota North Stars Pat Price	To New York Rangers Willi Plett
September 9, 1987	To Chicago Blackhawks Duane Sutter	To New York Islanders 2nd-rd pick - 1988 entry draft (# 29 - Wayne Doucet)
September 15, 1987	To New Jersey Devils Patrik Sundstrom; 4th-rd pick - 1988 entry draft (# 65 - Matt Ruchty); Devils' option to swap 2nd-rd pick - 1988 entry draft^{1} (# 23 - Jeff Christian)	To Vancouver Canucks Greg Adams; Kirk McLean; 2nd-rd pick - 1988 entry draft (# 33 - Leif Rohlin)^{1}
September 17, 1987	To Toronto Maple Leafs Dale Degray	To Calgary Flames 5th-rd pick - 1988 entry draft (# 90 - Scott Matusovich)
September 30, 1987	To Winnipeg Jets George McPhee	To New York Rangers 4th-rd pick - 1989 entry draft (# 67 - Jim Cummings)
September 30, 1987	To Quebec Nordiques Terry Carkner; Jeff Jackson	To New York Rangers John Ogrodnick; David Shaw

1. New Jersey exercised the option and swap the 33rd pick for the 23rd overall pick in 1988.

=== October ===
October 5, 1987	To Hartford Whalers Mark Reeds	To St. Louis Blues 3rd-rd pick - 1989 entry draft (HAR - # 52 - Blair Atcheynum)^{1}
October 6, 1987	To Boston Bruins Mike Stevens	To Vancouver Canucks cash
October 7, 1987	To New Jersey Devils George McPhee	To Winnipeg Jets future considerations
October 8, 1987	To Minnesota North Stars Jay Caufield; Dave Gagner	To New York Rangers Paul Boutilier; Jari Gronstrand
October 13, 1987	To Buffalo Sabres 6th-rd pick - 1988 entry draft (# 106 - David DiVita)	To Minnesota North Stars Andy Ristau
October 13, 1987	To Montreal Canadiens Larry Trader; 3rd-rd pick - 1989 entry draft (# 51 - Pierre Sevigny)	To St. Louis Blues Gaston Gingras; 3rd-rd pick - 1989 entry draft (WIN - # 62 - Kris Draper)^{2}
October 15, 1987	To Hartford Whalers Tiger Williams	To Los Angeles Kings cash
October 19, 1987	To Edmonton Oilers Dave Donnelly	To Chicago Blackhawks cash

1. Hartford's third-round pick was re-acquired as the result of a trade on March 8, 1988, that sent Hartford's second-round pick in the 1989 entry draft in exchange for Charlie Bourgeois and this pick.
2. St. Louis' third-round pick went to Winnipeg as the result of a trade on June 17, 1989, that sent Winnipeg's third-round pick in 1989 entry draft and second-round pick in 1991 entry draft in exchange for Greg Paslawski and this pick.

=== November ===
November 4, 1987	To Vancouver Canucks Willie Huber; Larry Melnyk	To New York Rangers Michel Petit
November 6, 1987	To Calgary Flames Jim Leavins	To New York Rangers Don Mercier
November 20, 1987	To Minnesota North Stars Curt Giles	To New York Rangers Byron Lomow future considerations
November 21, 1987	To Edmonton Oilers Dave Hannan; Chris Joseph; Moe Mantha Jr. Craig Simpson	To Pittsburgh Penguins Paul Coffey; Dave Hunter; Wayne Van Dorp

=== December ===
December 4, 1987	To Toronto Maple Leafs Mike Stothers	To Philadelphia Flyers future considerations (5th-rd pick - 1989 entry draft - MIN - # 34 - Pat MacLeod)^{1}
December 11, 1987	To St. Louis Blues Paul Cavallini	To Washington Capitals 2nd-rd pick - 1988 entry draft (# 41 - Wade Bartley)^{2}
December 14, 1987	To Toronto Maple Leafs Sean McKenna	To Los Angeles Kings Mike Allison
December 16, 1987	To Winnipeg Jets Paul Boutilier	To New York Rangers future considerations (5th-rd pick - 1989 entry draft - # 88 - Aaron Miller)^{3}
December 17, 1987	To Montreal Canadiens future considerations (3rd-rd pick - 1988 entry draft - # 46 - Neil Carnes)^{4}	To Pittsburgh Penguins Perry Ganchar future considerations (3rd-rd pick - 1988 entry draft - # 62 - Daniel Gauthier)^{4}
December 17, 1987	To Quebec Nordiques Bobby Dollas	To Winnipeg Jets Stu Kulak
December 31, 1987	To Buffalo Sabres Mike Donnelly; 5th-rd pick - 1988 entry draft (# 89 - Alexander Mogilny)	To New York Rangers Paul Cyr; 10th-rd pick - 1988 entry draft - (# 202 - Eric Fenton)

1. Philadelphia's fifth-round pick went to Minnesota as the result of a trade on December 8, 1988, that sent Moe Mantha Jr. to Philadelphia in exchange for this pick. The completion date of the original trade between Toronto and Philadelphia is unknown.
2. Washington had the option of the 2nd-rd pick in 1988 or 1989 NHL Entry Draft. They selected in the 1988 draft.
3. Exact completion of the trade unknown.
4. Trade completed on June 11, 1988.

=== January ===
January 3, 1988	To Minnesota North Stars Curt Fraser	To Chicago Blackhawks Dirk Graham
January 3, 1988	To Hartford Whalers Neil Sheehy; Carey Wilson rights to Lane MacDonald	To Calgary Flames Shane Churla; Dana Murzyn
January 10, 1988	To Detroit Red Wings Jim Nill	To Winnipeg Jets Mark Kumpel
January 14, 1988	To Montreal Canadiens future considerations	To Winnipeg Jets Alfie Turcotte
January 21, 1988	To Los Angeles Kings Mike Siltala; Gord Walker	To New York Rangers Joe Paterson
January 21, 1988	To Montreal Canadiens future considerations	To St. Louis Blues Scott Harlow
January 22, 1988	To Hartford Whalers Lindsay Carson	To Philadelphia Flyers Paul Lawless
January 22, 1988	To Minnesota North Stars Moe Mantha Jr.	To Edmonton Oilers Keith Acton
January 27, 1988	To Montreal Canadiens Canadiens option to swap 1st-rd pick - 1989 entry draft (# 13 - Lindsay Vallis)^{1}	To New York Rangers Chris Nilan

1. Montreal exercised the option and swap the 20th pick for the 13rd overall pick in 1989.

=== February ===
February 2, 1988	To Montreal Canadiens future considerations	To St. Louis Blues Ernie Vargas
February 4, 1988	To Los Angeles Kings Chris Kontos; 6th-rd pick - 1988 entry draft (# 109 - Micah Aivazoff)	To Pittsburgh Penguins Bryan Erickson
February 9, 1988	To Minnesota North Stars 4th-rd pick - 1989 entry draft (# 75 - J. F. Quintin)	To Philadelphia Flyers Gordie Roberts
February 9, 1988	To Los Angeles Kings Grant Ledyard	To Washington Capitals Craig Laughlin
February 11, 1988	To Buffalo Sabres Scott Metcalfe; 9th-rd pick - 1989 entry draft (# 183 - Donald Audette)	To Edmonton Oilers Steve Dykstra; 7th-rd pick - 1989 entry draft (# 140 - Davis Payne)
February 19, 1988	To Montreal Canadiens Martin Nicoletti	To Calgary Flames Rick Hayward
February 22, 1988	To Minnesota North Stars John Barrett	To Washington Capitals future considerations
February 23, 1988	To Los Angeles Kings Ron Duguay	To New York Rangers Mark Hardy

=== March ===
- Trading Deadline: March 8, 1988

March 1, 1988	To Vancouver Canucks Paul Lawless; 5th-rd pick - 1989 entry draft (EDM - # 92 - Peter White)^{1}	To Philadelphia Flyers Willie Huber
March 6, 1988	To Vancouver Canucks Peter Bakovic; Brian Bradley; Kevan Guy	To Calgary Flames Craig Coxe
March 7, 1988	To Minnesota North Stars rights to John Blue	To Winnipeg Jets 7th-rd pick - 1988 entry draft (# 127 - Markus Akerblom)
March 7, 1988	To Calgary Flames Rob Ramage; Rick Wamsley	To St. Louis Blues Steve Bozek; Brett Hull
March 8, 1988	To Boston Bruins Moe Lemay	To Edmonton Oilers Alan May
March 8, 1988	To Minnesota North Stars Gord Dineen	To New York Islanders Chris Pryor; 7th-rd pick - 1989 entry draft (# 133 - Brett Harkins)
March 8, 1988	To Hartford Whalers Charlie Bourgeois; 3rd-rd pick - 1989 entry draft (# 52 - Blair Atcheynum)	To St. Louis Blues 2nd-rd pick - 1989 entry draft (# 31 - Rick Corriveau)
March 8, 1988	To Hartford Whalers Richard Brodeur	To Vancouver Canucks Steve Weeks
March 8, 1988	To Detroit Red Wings Jim Pavese	To New York Rangers future considerations (5th-rd pick - 1988 entry draft - (DET - # 87 - Tony Burns)^{2}
March 8, 1988	To Boston Bruins Andy Moog	To Edmonton Oilers Geoff Courtnall; Bill Ranford; 2nd-rd pick - 1988 entry draft (# 39 - Petro Koivunen)
March 8, 1988	To Toronto Maple Leafs Brian Curran	To New York Islanders 6th-rd pick - 1988 entry draft (# 111 - Pavel Gross)
March 8, 1988	To St. Louis Blues Gordie Roberts	To Philadelphia Flyers 4th-rd pick - 1989 entry draft (# 72 - Reid Simpson)
March 8, 1988	To New Jersey Devils 10th-rd pick - 1988 entry draft (# 207 - Alexander Semak)	To Boston Bruins Steve Tsujiura

1. Vancouver's fifth-round pick then went to Edmonton as the result of a trade on March 7, 1989, that sent Greg Adams and Doug Smith to Vancouver in exchange for John LeBlanc and this pick.
2. Detroit's fifth-round pick was re-acquired as the result of a trade on September 9, 1989, that sent Kris King to the Rangers in exchange for Chris McRae and this pick.

== Additional sources ==
- hockeydb.com - search for player and select "show trades"
- "NHL trades for 1987-1988". NHL Trade Tracker.
