= Gord Dineen =

Canadian ice hockey coach

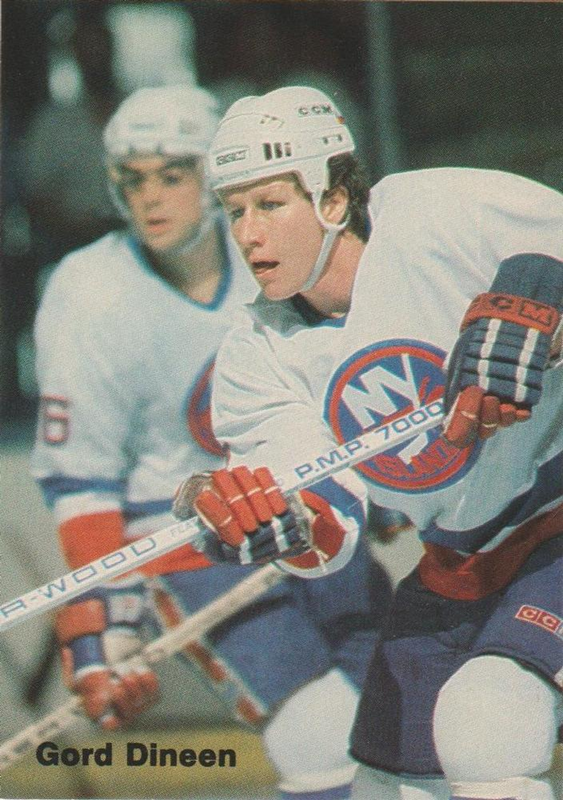
- Born: September 21, 1962 (age 64) Toronto, Ontario, Canada
- Height: 5 ft 11 in (180 cm)
- Weight: 185 lb (84 kg; 13 st 3 lb)
- Position: Defence
- Shot: Right
- Played for: New York Islanders; Minnesota North Stars; Pittsburgh Penguins; Ottawa Senators
- NHL draft: 42nd overall, 1981; New York Islanders
- Playing career: 1982–2000

Gordon M. Dineen (born September 21, 1962) is a Canadian former professional ice hockey defenceman and coach who most recently served as an assistant coach with Rochester Americans of the American Hockey League (AHL). He is a former head coach for the AHL's Toronto Marlies and a longtime assistant with several other teams.

Although born in Canada, Dineen spent much of his youth in the United States while his father, Bill Dineen, played and coached professionally. He returned to Canada to play major junior hockey for Sault Ste. Marie Greyhounds. He was drafted by New York Islanders with the 42nd pick in the 1981 draft. His brothers Kevin and Peter were also NHL players.

== Playing career ==
=== Junior ===
Dineen was drafted in the fifth round, 54th overall, by the Sault Ste. Marie Greyhounds of the Ontario Hockey League (OHL) in 1980. In his rookie season with the Greyhounds in 1980–81, Dineen scored four goals and 30 points, as well as 158 penalty minutes, in 68 games. In the playoffs, Dineen had a goal, eight points, and 59 penalty minutes in 19 games as the Greyhounds lost to the Kitchener Rangers in the final round.

Dineen returned to the Greyhounds for the 1981–82 season, in which he saw his offensive numbers improve. In 68 games, Dineen scored nine goals and 54 points, while earning 185 penalty minutes. In the post-season, Dineen had a goal and three points in 13 games

=== Professional ===
==== New York Islanders (1982–1988) ====
Dineen was selected by the New York Islanders in the second round, 42nd overall, in the 1981 NHL entry draft. Following his junior career, the Islanders assigned Dineen to the Indianapolis Checkers of the Central Hockey League (CHL) for the 1982–83 season. In 73 games with the Checkers, Dineen scored 10 goals and 57 points. Dineen was named the CHL's Most Improved Defenseman and Most Outstanding Defenseman. In 13 playoff games, Dineen had two goals and 12 points, helping the Checkers win the Adams Cup. Dineen also saw limited action with the Islanders, playing in two games in the 1982–83 season and did not score any points.

Dineen spent more time with the Checkers in 1983–84, as he scored four goals and 17 points in 26 games with Indianapolis. He earned a promotion to the Islanders, in which he played in 43 games, scoring a goal and 12 points. Dineen played in nine playoff games, scoring a goal and two points, as the Islanders lost to the Edmonton Oilers in the 1984 Stanley Cup Final.

In 1984–85, Dineen spent time with the Islanders American Hockey League (AHL) affiliate, the Springfield Indians. In 25 games with Springfield, Dineen had a goal and nine points. He spent a majority of the 1984–85 season with the Islanders, playing in 48 games, scoring a goal and 13 points, as well as earning 89 penalty minutes. In 10 playoff games with New York, Dineen had no points and 26 penalty minutes. Dineen again split the 1985–86 season between Springfield and New York. In 11 games with the Indians, Dineen had two goals and five points. In 57 games with the Islanders in 1985–86, Dineen had a goal and nine points. In three playoff games, he was held with no points.

In 1986–87, Dineen remained in the NHL on a full-time basis. In 71 games with the Islanders, Dineen scored four goals and 14 points, while accumulating 110 penalty minutes. In the post-season, Dineen had four assists in seven games. His tenure with the Islanders is perhaps best known for assisting on Pat LaFontaine's series-winning goal in the fourth overtime in the 1987 Stanley Cup playoffs opening round against the Washington Capitals, known today as "The Easter Epic."

Dineen began the 1987–88 season with the Islanders, where in 57 games, Dineen scored four goals and 16 points. His career with the Islanders came to an end on March 7, 1988, as Dineen was traded to the Minnesota North Stars for Chris Pryor and a seventh round draft pick in the 1989 NHL entry draft.

==== Minnesota North Stars (1988) ====
His first game with the North Stars was on March 9, 1988, and was held without a point in a 6–2 loss to the Buffalo Sabres. On April 3, Dineen scored his first goal with the North Stars, against Mike Vernon of the Calgary Flames, in a 4–1 loss.

Dineen began the 1988–89 season with the North Stars, earning an assist in two games. The North Stars assigned Dineen to the Kalamazoo Wings of the International Hockey League (IHL) for 25 games with two goals and eight points. On December 17, 1988, the North Stars traded Dineen and Scott Bjugstad to the Pittsburgh Penguins for Ville Siren and Steve Gotaas.

==== Pittsburgh Penguins (1988–1992) ====
Dineen made his debut with the Penguins on December 23, 1988, earning no points in a 2–2 tie against the New Jersey Devils. On December 31, Dineen earned his first point as a Penguin, an assist on a goal by Mario Lemieux in an 8–6 victory. On February 14, Dineen scored his first goal with Pittsburgh against Jacques Cloutier of Buffalo Sabres and added an assist in a 7–3 win. With the Penguins in 1988–89, Dineen played in 38 games, scoring a goal and three points. In the playoffs, Dineen added two assists in 11 games.

In 1989–90, Dineen played in 69 games with the Penguins, scoring a goal and eight points, while earning a career-high 125 penalty minutes. Dineen played most of the 1990–91 with the Muskegon Lumberjacks of the IHL, where Dineen scored one goal and 15 points in 40 games. In five playoff games with Muskegon, Dineen had two assists. In nine games with Pittsburgh during the 1990–91 season, Dineen had no points.

The 1991–92 season was mostly spent in Muskegon. In 79 games with the Lumberjacks, Dineen had eight goals and 45 points. In the post-season, Dineen scored two goals and six points in 14 games, as Muskegon lost to the Kansas City Blades in the Turner Cup finals. Dineen also appeared in one game with the Penguins during 1991–92, getting no points.

Following the season, Dineen was granted free agency.

==== Ottawa Senators (1992–1994) ====
Dineen signed with the expansion Ottawa Senators on August 31, 1992. The Senators assigned Dineen to the San Diego Gulls of the IHL to begin the 1992–93 season. With the Gulls, Dineen had six goals and 29 points in 41 games, earning a promotion to the Senators. Dineen played in his first game with Ottawa on January 21, 1993, where he was held without a point in a 7–2 loss to Minnesota North Stars. On February 8, Dineen earned his first two points with the Senators, both assists, in a 4–2 win over Buffalo Sabres. On February 25, Dineen scored his first goal with the Senators against Tom Barrasso of the Pittsburgh Penguins and added an assist in a 2–1 win. In 32 games with Ottawa, Dineen had two goals and six points.

In 1993–94, Dineen returned to the Senators. With 17 games remaining in the season, the Senators named Dineen captain of the club for the rest of the year. Overall, in a career high 77 games, Dineen did not score a goal, but had 21 assists. After the season, Dineen became a free agent.

==== New York Islanders (1994–1995) ====
On July 26, 1994, Dineen returned to the Islanders, as a free agent. Due to the 1994–95 NHL lockout, Dineen spent a majority of the season with the Islanders IHL affiliate, the Denver Grizzlies, where he was named captain of the team. In 68 games with Denver, Dineen scored five goals and 32 points. In 17 playoff games, Dineen had a goal and seven points, as Denver won the Turner Cup. Dineen did play in nine games with the Islanders during 1994–95, earning no points.

==== International Hockey League (1995–2000) ====
With the arrival of Colorado Avalanche for the 1995–96 season, the Grizzlies relocated to Utah as the Utah Grizzlies. Dineen remained captain of the club. In the 1995–96 season, Dineen scored a goal and 18 points in 82 games. In the playoffs, Dineen earned three assists in 22 games, as the Grizzlies once again won the Turner Cup.

In 1996–97, Dineen appeared in 81 games, scoring five goals and 34 points. In seven post-season games, he earned three points. Dineen played in all 82 games for the Grizzlies in the 1997–98 season, scoring three goals and 37 points for the club. In four playoff games, Dineen had two assists. Dineen continued to be productive during the 1998–99 season with Utah as in 77 games, he had five goals and 27 points.

In the 1999–2000 season, Dineen became a player-coach with the Grizzlies. In 50 games, he had 18 points, all assists. On March 16, 2000, Dineen was traded to Chicago Wolves. In 17 games, he had a goal and three points. In the post-season, Dineen had five assists in 16 games, helping Chicago win the Turner Cup.

Following the season, Dineen announced his retirement from playing. His number 2 is the only number retired by the Grizzlies.

== Coaching career ==
Dineen's was named as a player-coach during his final season with the Grizzlies in 1999 until he was traded to the Wolves in March 2000. After retiring from playing, Dineen was named an assistant coach with the Louisville Panthers of the AHL in 2000–01. Louisville was the AHL affiliate of the Florida Panthers. Dineen worked under head coach Joe Paterson. The next season, he was named head coach and general manager of the Macon Whoopee of the East Coast Hockey League (ECHL) for the 2001–02 season. Under Dineen, the Whoopee finished with a 29–31–12 record, earning 70 points, and did not make the post-season. Following the season, the Whoopee relocated to Lexington, Kentucky, to become the Lexington Men O' War and he was not retained by the club.

In 2002, Dineen became the head coach and general manager of the ECHL's Richmond Renegades, leading the team to a 35–31–6 record and 76 points. The club failed to make the playoffs and folded at the end of the season.

Dineen was then hired by the Phoenix Coyotes as an assistant coach for their AHL affiliate, the Springfield Falcons of the AHL, for the 2003–04 season. The next season, the Coyotes changed their AHL affiliation to Utah Grizzlies, which had since joined the AHL after the IHL dissolved, and Dineen was retained by the organization as an assistant coach under Pat Conacher in the 2004–05 season. The Grizzlies suspended operations in 2005 and Dineen was moved to the Coyotes' new AHL affiliate, the San Antonio Rampage in the same role from 2005 to 2007. The Coyotes released the entire Rampage coaching staff the end of the season.

Dineen was hired by the Anaheim Ducks in the 2007–08 season to join the coaching staff of their affiliate, the Portland Pirates, where he worked under head coach and younger brother Kevin Dineen. Following the season, the Ducks affiliated with the Iowa Chops. The Ducks named him head coach of the Chops for the 2008–09 season, his first AHL head coaching job. The Chops finished the season with a 33–33–4–10 record, earning 80 points, and missed the playoffs. After the season, the Ducks dropped the Chops as their affiliate, leading to the team having their franchise revoked and the team suspended. The Ducks did not have an AHL affiliate for the 2009–10 season and Dineen was not retained by the Ducks.

For 2009–10, Dineen was hired as an assistant coach with Toronto Marlies, the AHL affiliate of Toronto Maple Leafs. He remained with the Marlies as an assistant under head coach Dallas Eakins from 2009 to 2013 and under Steve Spott in 2013–14. Dineen was promoted to head coach of the Marlies for the 2014–15 season, earning a record of 40–27–9–0 for 89 points, finishing second in the North Division. In the post-season, the Marlies lost to the Grand Rapids Griffins in the first round. The Maple Leafs then hired Sheldon Keefe as head coach of the Marlies for the 2015–16 season, deemed and up and coming coach, and Dineen was moved back to the assistant coaching position. Following the 2016–17 season, Dineen was not retained by the Marlies.

Dineen then joined the Rochester Americans of the AHL as an assistant to head coach Chris Taylor in 2017. Days before the start of the 2019–20 AHL season, Taylor was called up to the Americans' NHL parent team, Buffalo Sabres, and Dineen was named the Americans' interim head coach. After Taylor returned from Buffalo, Dineen went back to his role as assistant coach. Taylor and Dineen were fired by the Americans in June 2020.

== Awards ==
- 1982–83: Bobby Orr Trophy
- 1982–83: Bob Gassoff Trophy

== Career statistics ==
			Regular Season					Playoffs
Season	Team	League	GP	G	A	Pts	PIM	GP	G	A	Pts	PIM
1979–80	St. Michael's Buzzers	MetJHL	42	11	24	35	103	—	—	—	—	—
1980–81	Sault Ste. Marie Greyhounds	OMJHL	68	4	26	30	158	19	1	7	8	58
1981–82	Sault Ste. Marie Greyhounds	OHL	68	9	45	54	185	13	1	2	3	52
1982–83	New York Islanders	NHL	2	0	0	0	4	—	—	—	—	—
1982–83	Indianapolis Checkers	CHL	73	10	47	57	78	13	2	10	12	29
1983–84	New York Islanders	NHL	43	1	11	12	32	9	1	1	2	28
1983–84	Indianapolis Checkers	CHL	26	4	13	17	63	—	—	—	—	—
1984–85	Springfield Indians	AHL	25	1	8	9	46	—	—	—	—	—
1984–85	New York Islanders	NHL	48	1	12	13	89	10	0	0	0	26
1985–86	Springfield Indians	AHL	11	2	3	5	20	—	—	—	—	—
1985–86	New York Islanders	NHL	57	1	8	9	81	3	0	0	0	2
1986–87	New York Islanders	NHL	71	4	10	14	110	7	0	4	4	4
1987–88	New York Islanders	NHL	57	4	12	16	62	—	—	—	—	—
1987–88	Minnesota North Stars	NHL	13	1	1	2	21	—	—	—	—	—
1988–89	Kalamazoo Wings	IHL	25	2	6	8	49	—	—	—	—	—
1988–89	Minnesota North Stars	NHL	2	0	1	1	2	—	—	—	—	—
1988–89	Pittsburgh Penguins	NHL	38	1	2	3	42	11	0	2	2	8
1989–90	Pittsburgh Penguins	NHL	69	1	8	9	125	—	—	—	—	—
1990–91	Pittsburgh Penguins	NHL	9	0	0	0	6	—	—	—	—	—
1990–91	Muskegon Lumberjacks	IHL	40	1	14	15	57	5	0	2	2	0
1991–92	Pittsburgh Penguins	NHL	1	0	0	0	0	—	—	—	—	—
1991–92	Muskegon Lumberjacks	IHL	79	8	37	45	83	14	2	4	6	33
1992–93	Ottawa Senators	NHL	32	2	4	6	30	—	—	—	—	—
1992–93	San Diego Gulls	IHL	41	6	23	29	36	—	—	—	—	—
1993–94	Ottawa Senators	NHL	77	0	21	21	89	—	—	—	—	—
1993–94	San Diego Gulls	IHL	3	0	0	0	2	—	—	—	—	—
1994–95	New York Islanders	NHL	9	0	0	0	2	—	—	—	—	—
1994–95	Denver Grizzlies	IHL	68	5	27	32	75	17	1	6	7	8
1995–96	Utah Grizzlies	IHL	82	1	17	18	89	22	0	3	3	14
1996–97	Utah Grizzlies	IHL	81	5	29	34	62	7	0	3	3	4
1997–98	Utah Grizzlies	IHL	82	3	34	37	63	4	0	2	2	2
1998–99	Utah Grizzlies	IHL	77	5	22	27	78	—	—	—	—	—
1999–2000	Utah Grizzlies	IHL	50	0	18	18	26	—	—	—	—	—
1999–2000	Chicago Wolves	IHL	17	1	2	3	14	16	0	5	5	12
NHL totals			529	16	90	106	695	40	1	7	8	68
IHL totals			645	37	229	266	634	85	3	25	28	73

== Head coaching statistics ==
Years	Team	League	G	W	L	T	OTL	Pct	Playoffs
2001–02	Macon Whoopee	ECHL	72	29	31	12	0	0.486	Did not qualify
2002–03	Richmond Renegades	ECHL	72	35	31	6	0	0.528	Did not qualify
2008–09	Iowa Chops	AHL	80	33	33	0	14	0.500	Did not qualify
2014–15	Toronto Marlies	AHL	76	40	27	0	9	0.586	Lost in first round
2019	Rochester Americans	AHL	17	11	3	0	3	0.647	

== See also ==
- Notable families in the NHL

Preceded by Mark Lamb; Brad Shaw	Ottawa Senators captain 1994	Succeeded by Randy Cunneyworth
