= Wes Jarvis =

Canadian ice hockey player (born 1958)

- Born: May 30, 1958 (age 68) Toronto, Ontario, Canada
- Height: 5 ft 11 in (180 cm)
- Weight: 185 lb (84 kg; 13 st 3 lb)
- Position: Centre
- Played for: Washington Capitals; Minnesota North Stars; Los Angeles Kings; Toronto Maple Leafs
- NHL draft: 213th overall, 1978; Washington Capitals
- Playing career: 1978–1990

Wesley Herbert Jarvis (born May 30, 1958) is a Canadian former professional ice hockey player. He played in the National Hockey League (NHL) with four teams between 1979 and 1988, though much of his career was spent in the minor American Hockey League. His cousin, Doug Jarvis, also played in the NHL.

== Hockey career ==
As a youth, Jarvis played in the 1971 Quebec International Pee-Wee Hockey Tournament with a minor ice hockey team from Toronto.

Selected by the Washington Capitals in the 1978 NHL entry draft, Jarvis also played for the Minnesota North Stars, Los Angeles Kings, and Toronto Maple Leafs. Jarvis was the winner of the 1978–79 Gary F. Longman Memorial Trophy, which is awarded to the player voted to be most outstanding in his first season in the International Hockey League by the league coaches. During the 1982–83 season, Jarvis won the Phil Esposito Trophy, which is awarded to the leading scorer of the Central Hockey League for the regular season. His last season of professional hockey was in 1989–90 with the Newmarket Saints. Jarvis was the head coach of the Newmarket Hurricanes of the OPJHL and was an assistant coach with the Barrie Colts for three seasons.

== Personal life ==
Now living in Ontario with his wife Darlene and four daughters (Darcie, Corie, Terrie, and Leslie), Jarvis and former NHL teammate Mike Gartner own and run National Training Rinks, a hockey training and instruction facility. He is the brother in-law of Dwight Foster, uncle of Alex Foster, and cousin of Doug Jarvis.

== Career statistics ==
=== Regular season and playoffs ===
			Regular season					Playoffs
Season	Team	League	GP	G	A	Pts	PIM	GP	G	A	Pts	PIM
1974–75	Weston Dodgers	OPJAHL	38	20	27	47	18	—	—	—	—	—
1975–76	Sudbury Wolves	OMJHL	64	26	48	74	22	—	—	—	—	—
1976–77	Sudbury Wolves	OMJHL	65	36	60	96	24	—	—	—	—	—
1977–78	Sudbury Wolves	OMJHL	21	7	16	23	16	—	—	—	—	—
1977–78	Windsor Spitfires	OMJHL	44	27	51	78	37	—	—	—	—	—
1978–79	Port Huron Flags	IHL	73	44	65	100	39	7	4	4	8	2
1979–80	Washington Capitals	NHL	63	11	15	26	8	—	—	—	—	—
1979–80	Hershey Bears	AHL	16	6	14	20	4	—	—	—	—	—
1980–81	Washington Capitals	NHL	55	9	14	23	30	—	—	—	—	—
1980–81	Hershey Bears	AHL	24	15	25	40	39	10	3	13	16	2
1981–82	Washington Capitals	NHL	26	1	12	13	18	—	—	—	—	—
1981–82	Hershey Bears	AHL	56	31	61	92	44	5	3	4	7	4
1982–83	Minnesota North Stars	NHL	3	0	0	0	2	—	—	—	—	—
1982–83	Birmingham South Stars	CHL	75	40	68	108	36	13	8	8	16	4
1983–84	Los Angeles Kings	NHL	61	9	13	22	36	—	—	—	—	—
1984–85	Toronto Maple Leafs	NHL	26	0	1	1	2	—	—	—	—	—
1984–85	St. Catharines Saints	AHL	52	29	44	73	22	—	—	—	—	—
1985–86	Toronto Maple Leafs	NHL	2	1	0	1	2	—	—	—	—	—
1985–86	St. Catharines Saints	AHL	74	36	60	96	38	13	5	8	13	12
1986–87	Toronto Maple Leafs	NHL	—	—	—	—	—	2	0	0	0	2
1986–87	Newmarket Saints	AHL	70	28	50	78	32	—	—	—	—	—
1987–88	Toronto Maple Leafs	NHL	1	0	0	0	0	—	—	—	—	—
1987–88	Newmarket Saints	AHL	79	25	59	84	48	—	—	—	—	—
1988–89	Newmarket Saints	AHL	52	22	31	53	38	5	2	4	6	4
1989–90	Newmarket Saints	AHL	36	13	22	35	18	—	—	—	—	—
AHL totals			459	205	366	571	283	33	13	29	42	22
NHL totals			237	31	55	86	98	2	0	0	0	2

Preceded by Bob Francis	Winner of the Phil Esposito Trophy; 1982–83	Succeeded by Scott MacLeod
