= NHL waiver draft =

Annual North American hockey draft

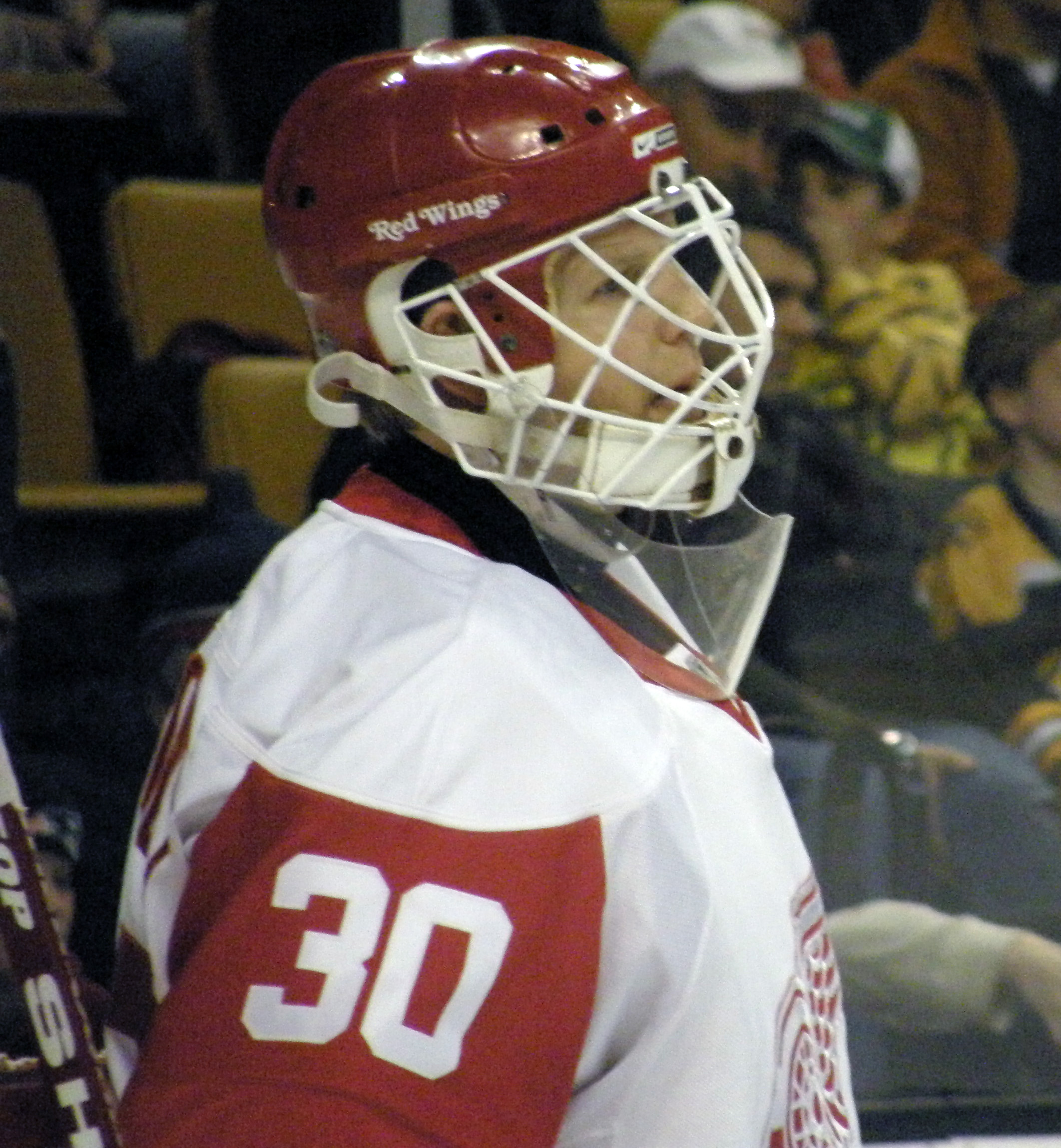
Left unprotected by the Detroit Red Wings for the 2001 NHL waiver draft, Chris Osgood was selected by the New York Islanders and became their starting goaltender, ultimately helping his new team qualify for the playoffs in 2002 for the first time since 1994.

The NHL waiver draft was an annual draft held by the National Hockey League (NHL) from 1977 to 2003. A reworked version of the NHL intra-league draft, the waiver draft was created to help address the league's competitive balances issues and the financial issues some of the expansion teams added in the preceding ten years were undergoing. It was not held during the 1979–80 and 1991–92 seasons due to the 1979 merger with the World Hockey Association and the 1991 NHL dispersal and expansion drafts, respectively. It was discontinued as a result of the collective bargaining agreement that was reached to end the 2004–05 NHL lockout. Over the course of 25 waiver drafts, 231 selections were made and 240 players total changed teams.

== Rules ==
The waiver draft was held within a week of the start of the regular season. A few days prior to the waiver draft each NHL club would be required to turn in a list of players to protect from selection. First-year players were exempt from selection, but in later editions of the waiver draft this exemption was changed to players under a certain number of professional hockey seasons played and below a minimum number of NHL games played.

The order of the waiver draft was the reverse of the previous season's standings, the first round always being limited to non-playoff teams. Once a team claimed an unprotected player from another team, that team would be required to drop a player from their protection list and the other team's choice of compensation would be a cash payment (a sliding scale varying from player to player) or claiming the dropped player.

The number of players a team could lose in the waiver draft was set at three (later two), which would increase by the number of claims made against other teams. By default, team's could only lose a maximum of one goaltender, unless they opted to offer more than one.

The waiver draft concluded when a round was completed with no selections by any team.

== Drafts ==
=== 1977 ===
The 1977 NHL waiver draft was held on October 10, 1977. Three selections were made. Protection lists were released prior to the draft.

Round	Pick	Player	Claimed by	Claimed from	Compensation
1	1	Paul Woods	Detroit Red Wings	Montreal Canadiens	cash
1	2	Dave Forbes	Washington Capitals	Boston Bruins	cash
1	3	Wayne Thomas	New York Rangers	Toronto Maple Leafs	cash

=== 1978 ===
The 1978 NHL waiver draft was held on October 9, 1978. Five selections were made and six players total changed teams. Protection lists were released three days prior to the draft.

Round	Pick	Player	Claimed by	Claimed from	Compensation
1	1	Pierre Bouchard	Washington Capitals	Montreal Canadiens	cash
1	2	Larry Giroux	St. Louis Blues	Detroit Red Wings	cash
1	3	Pierre Plante	New York Rangers	Detroit Red Wings	cash
1	4	Jim Lorentz	Detroit Red Wings	Buffalo Sabres	cash
2	5	Mike Korney	New York Rangers	Montreal Canadiens	claim: Dan Newman

=== 1980 ===
The 1980 NHL waiver draft was held on October 8, 1980. Five selections were made. Protection lists were released a day prior to the draft.

Round	Pick	Player	Claimed by	Claimed from	Compensation
1	1	Yvon Vautour	Colorado Rockies	New York Islanders	cash
1	2	John Wensink	Quebec Nordiques	Boston Bruins	cash
1	3	Rick Smith	Detroit Red Wings	Boston Bruins	cash
1	4	Curt Brackenbury	Edmonton Oilers	Quebec Nordiques	cash
1	5	Colin Campbell	Vancouver Canucks	Edmonton Oilers	cash

=== 1981 ===
The 1981 NHL waiver draft was held on October 5, 1981. 13 selections were made. Protection lists were released two days prior to the draft.

Round	Pick	Player	Claimed by	Claimed from	Compensation
1	1	Craig Levie	Winnipeg Jets	Montreal Canadiens	cash
1	2	John Wensink	Colorado Rockies	Quebec Nordiques	cash
1	3	Mike McDougal	Hartford Whalers	New York Rangers	cash
1	4	Terry Murray	Washington Capitals	Philadelphia Flyers	cash
1	5	Ron Delorme	Vancouver Canucks	Colorado Rockies	cash
1	6	Yvon Lambert	Buffalo Sabres	Montreal Canadiens	cash
1	7	Al Sims	Los Angeles Kings	Hartford Whalers	cash
1	8	Gary Edwards	St. Louis Blues	Edmonton Oilers	cash
2	9	Serge Savard	Winnipeg Jets	Montreal Canadiens	cash
2	10	Rob McClanahan	Hartford Whalers	Buffalo Sabres	cash
2	11	John Bednarski	Pittsburgh Penguins	Buffalo Sabres	cash
3	12	Trevor Johansen	Los Angeles Kings	St. Louis Blues	cash
4	13	Jeff Brubaker	Montreal Canadiens	Hartford Whalers	cash

=== 1982 ===
The 1982 NHL waiver draft was held on October 4, 1982. Seven selections were made and nine players total changed teams. Protection lists were released three days prior to the draft.

Round	Pick	Player	Claimed by	Claimed from	Compensation
1	1	Murray Brumwell	New Jersey Devils	Minnesota North Stars	cash
1	2	Jack Carlson	St. Louis Blues	Minnesota North Stars	cash
1	3	Doug Lecuyer	Pittsburgh Penguins	Winnipeg Jets	cash
1	4	Bill Baker	New York Rangers	St. Louis Blues	claim: Tim Bothwell
2	5	Carol Vadnais	New Jersey Devils	New York Rangers	claim: Graeme Nicolson
3	6	Dave Hutchison	New Jersey Devils	Washington Capitals	cash
4	7	Bob Hoffmeyer	Edmonton Oilers	Philadelphia Flyers	cash

=== 1983 ===
The 1983 NHL waiver draft was held on October 3, 1983. Eleven selections were made. Protection lists were released two days prior to the draft.

Round	Pick	Player	Claimed by	Claimed from	Compensation
1	1	Grant Mulvey	Pittsburgh Penguins	Chicago Black Hawks	cash
1	2	Mike Crombeen	Hartford Whalers	St. Louis Blues	cash
1	3	Don Nachbaur	Los Angeles Kings	Edmonton Oilers	cash
1	4	Terry Johnson	St. Louis Blues	Quebec Nordiques	cash
1	5	Mark Renaud	Buffalo Sabres	Hartford Whalers	cash
1	6	Jean Hamel	Montreal Canadiens	Quebec Nordiques	cash
2	7	Mike Zuke	Hartford Whalers	St. Louis Blues	cash
2	8	Dwight Schofield	St. Louis Blues	Montreal Canadiens	cash
2	9	Jeff Brubaker	Calgary Flames	Montreal Canadiens	cash
2	10	John Van Boxmeer	Quebec Nordiques	Buffalo Sabres	cash
3	11	Bob Crawford	Hartford Whalers	St. Louis Blues	cash

=== 1984 ===
The 1984 NHL waiver draft was held on October 9, 1984. Nine selections were made and ten players total changed teams. Protection lists were released four days prior to the draft.

Round	Pick	Player	Claimed by	Claimed from	Compensation
1	1	Wayne Babych	Pittsburgh Penguins	St. Louis Blues	cash
1	2	Dave Pichette	New Jersey Devils	St. Louis Blues	cash
1	3	Jeff Brubaker	Toronto Maple Leafs	Edmonton Oilers	claim: Terry Martin
1	4	Wally Weir	Hartford Whalers	Quebec Nordiques	cash
1	5	Craig Levie	St. Louis Blues	Minnesota North Stars	cash
1	6	Andre Dore	New York Rangers	Quebec Nordiques	cash
1	7	Billy Carroll	Edmonton Oilers	New York Islanders	cash
2	8	Bruce Crowder	Pittsburgh Penguins	Boston Bruins	cash
2	9	Dave Lumley	Hartford Whalers	Edmonton Oilers	cash

=== 1985 ===
The 1985 NHL waiver draft was held on October 7, 1985. Nine selections were made. Protection lists were released three days prior to the draft.

Round	Pick	Player	Claimed by	Claimed from	Compensation
1	1	Willy Lindstrom	Pittsburgh Penguins	Edmonton Oilers	cash
1	2	Randy Velischek	New Jersey Devils	Minnesota North Stars	cash
1	3	Brent Peterson	Vancouver Canucks	Buffalo Sabres	cash
1	4	Randy Boyd	New York Islanders	Chicago Black Hawks	cash
1	5	Dwight Schofield	Washington Capitals	St. Louis Blues	cash
2	6	Mike Blaisdell	Pittsburgh Penguins	New York Rangers	cash
2	7	Dave Langevin	Minnesota North Stars	New York Islanders	cash
3	8	Dan Frawley	Pittsburgh Penguins	Chicago Black Hawks	cash
4	9	Craig Levie	Calgary Flames	St. Louis Blues	cash

=== 1986 ===
The 1986 NHL waiver draft was held on October 6, 1986. Seven selections were made. Protection lists were released three days prior to the draft.

Round	Pick	Player	Claimed by	Claimed from	Compensation
1	1	Bob Bourne	Los Angeles Kings	New York Islanders	cash
1	2	Clark Gillies	Buffalo Sabres	New York Islanders	cash
2	3	Mal Davis	Los Angeles Kings	Buffalo Sabres	cash
2	4	Wilf Paiement	Buffalo Sabres	New York Rangers	cash
3	No selections during round				
4	5	Pat Hughes	St. Louis Blues	Buffalo Sabres	cash
4	6	Gord Sherven	Hartford Whalers	Edmonton Oilers	cash
4	7	John Blum	Washington Capitals	Boston Bruins	cash

=== 1987 ===
The 1987 NHL waiver draft was held on October 5, 1987. 17 selections were made and 19 players total changed teams.

Round	Pick	Player	Claimed by	Claimed from	Compensation
1	1	Kevin Maguire	Buffalo Sabres	Toronto Maple Leafs	cash
1	2	Reijo Ruotsalainen	New Jersey Devils	Edmonton Oilers	cash
1	3	Randy Boyd	Vancouver Canucks	New York Islanders	cash
1	4	Al Tuer	Minnesota North Stars	Edmonton Oilers	cash
1	5	Charlie Simmer	Pittsburgh Penguins	Boston Bruins	cash
2	6	Risto Siltanen	New Jersey Devils	Quebec Nordiques	cash
3	No selections during round				
4	7	Tim Tookey	Los Angeles Kings	Philadelphia Flyers	cash
4	8	Glen Cochrane	Chicago Blackhawks	Vancouver Canucks	cash
4	9	Bill Root	St. Louis Blues	Hartford Whalers	claim: Doug Wickenheiser
4	10	Willi Plett	Boston Bruins	New York Rangers	cash
5	11	Ed Hospodar	Buffalo Sabres	Philadelphia Flyers	claim: David Fenyves
5	12	Jack O'Callahan	New Jersey Devils	Chicago Blackhawks	cash
5	13	Doug Wickenheiser	Vancouver Canucks	Hartford Whalers	claim: Brent Peterson
5	14	Stu Kulak	Quebec Nordiques	New York Rangers	claim: Richard Zemlak
6	15	Richard Zemlak	Minnesota North Stars	New York Rangers	cash
	16	Paul Fenton	Los Angeles Kings	New York Rangers	
	17	Mark Lamb	Detroit Red Wings	Edmonton Oilers	

=== 1988 ===
The 1988 NHL waiver draft was held on October 3, 1988. 18 selections were made.

Round	Pick	Player	Claimed by	Claimed from	Compensation
1	1	Stewart Gavin	Minnesota North Stars	Hartford Whalers	cash
1	2	Behn Wilson	Vancouver Canucks	Chicago Blackhawks	cash
1	3	Steve Dykstra	Pittsburgh Penguins	Edmonton Oilers	cash
1	4	Craig Redmond	New York Rangers	Edmonton Oilers	cash
2	5	Tom Martin	Minnesota North Stars	Hartford Whalers	cash
2	6	Risto Siltanen	Vancouver Canucks	New Jersey Devils	cash
2	7	Jay Caufield	Pittsburgh Penguins	Minnesota North Stars	cash
3	8	Andy Brickley	Boston Bruins	New Jersey Devils	cash
3	9	Ken Hammond	Edmonton Oilers	Los Angeles Kings	cash
4	10	Ken Leiter	Minnesota North Stars	New York Islanders	cash
4	11	Dave Hannan	Pittsburgh Penguins	Edmonton Oilers	claim: Dave Hunter
4	12	Dave Hunter	Winnipeg Jets	Edmonton Oilers	cash
5	13	Jim Hofford	Los Angeles Kings	Buffalo Sabres	cash
5	14	Steve Smith	Buffalo Sabres	Calgary Flames	cash
5	15	Doug Sulliman	Philadelphia Flyers	New Jersey Devils	cash
5	16	Doug Smith	Edmonton Oilers	Buffalo Sabres	cash
6	17	Brad Marsh	Toronto Maple Leafs	Philadelphia Flyers	cash
6	18	Dale DeGray	Los Angeles Kings	Toronto Maple Leafs	cash

=== 1989 ===
The 1989 NHL waiver draft was held on October 2, 1989. Eight selections were made. Protection lists were released prior to the draft.

Round	Pick	Player	Claimed by	Claimed from	Compensation
1	1	Greg Adams	Quebec Nordiques	Vancouver Canucks	cash
1	2	Dave Hannan	Toronto Maple Leafs	Pittsburgh Penguins	cash
1	3	Moe Mantha Jr.	Winnipeg Jets	Philadelphia Flyers	cash
1	4	Kent Nilsson	New Jersey Devils	Edmonton Oilers	cash
2	5	David Mackey	Minnesota North Stars	Chicago Blackhawks	cash
2	6	Craig Coxe	Vancouver Canucks	Chicago Blackhawks	cash
2	7	Mikael Andersson	Hartford Whalers	Buffalo Sabres	cash
2	8	Nick Kypreos	Washington Capitals	Philadelphia Flyers	cash

=== 1990 ===
The 1990 NHL waiver draft was held on October 1, 1990. Eight selections were made.

Round	Pick	Player	Claimed by	Claimed from	Compensation
1	1	Wayne Van Dorp	Quebec Nordiques	Chicago Blackhawks	cash
1	2	Randy Gregg	Vancouver Canucks	Edmonton Oilers	cash
1	3	Bengt-Ake Gustafsson	Detroit Red Wings	Washington Capitals	cash
2	4	Shawn Anderson	Quebec Nordiques	Washington Capitals	cash
2	5	Mario Marois	St. Louis Blues	Quebec Nordiques	cash
3	6	Aaron Broten	Quebec Nordiques	Minnesota North Stars	cash
3	7	Rod Buskas	Los Angeles Kings	Pittsburgh Penguins	cash
3	8	Bob Bassen	St. Louis Blues	Chicago Blackhawks	cash

=== 1992 ===
The 1992 NHL waiver draft was held on October 4, 1992. Eight selections were made.

Round	Pick	Player	Claimed by	Claimed from	Compensation
1	1	Adam Creighton	Tampa Bay Lightning	New York Islanders	cash
1	2	Norm Maciver	Ottawa Senators	Edmonton Oilers	cash
1	3	Yvon Corriveau	San Jose Sharks	Washington Capitals	cash
1	4	Chris Dahlquist	Calgary Flames	Minnesota North Stars	cash
1	5	Shawn Cronin	Philadelphia Flyers	Quebec Nordiques	cash
2	6	Igor Larionov	San Jose Sharks	Vancouver Canucks	cash
2	7	Doug Evans	Philadelphia Flyers	Quebec Nordiques	cash
2	8	Dave Christian	Chicago Blackhawks	St. Louis Blues	cash

=== 1993 ===
The 1993 NHL waiver draft was held on October 3, 1993. Six selections were made. Protection lists were released prior to the draft.

Round	Pick	Player	Claimed by	Claimed from	Compensation
1	1	Dave McLlwain	Ottawa Senators	Toronto Maple Leafs	cash
1	2	Mike Hudson	New York Rangers	Edmonton Oilers	cash
1	3	Paul Broten	Dallas Stars	New York Rangers	cash
2	4	John McIntyre	Vancouver Canucks	New York Rangers	cash
2	5	Rich Sutter	Chicago Blackhawks	St. Louis Blues	cash
3	6	Garry Valk	Mighty Ducks of Anaheim	Vancouver Canucks	cash

=== 1994 ===
The 1994 NHL waiver draft was held on January 18, 1995. Due to the 1994–95 NHL lockout, the waiver draft was postponed until January. 17 selections were made. Protection lists were released prior to the draft.

Round	Pick	Player	Claimed by	Claimed from	Compensation
1	1	Rob Gaudreau	Ottawa Senators	San Jose Sharks	cash
1	2	Brian Glynn	Hartford Whalers	Vancouver Canucks	cash
1	3	Dean Kennedy	Edmonton Oilers	Winnipeg Jets	cash
2	4	Kelly Chase	Hartford Whalers	St. Louis Blues	cash
2	5	Len Esau	Edmonton Oilers	Calgary Flames	cash
2	6	Donald Dufresne	St. Louis Blues	Los Angeles Kings	cash
2	7	Randy Wood	Toronto Maple Leafs	Buffalo Sabres	cash
2	8	Chris Joseph	Pittsburgh Penguins	Tampa Bay Lightning	cash
3	9	Igor Korolev	Winnipeg Jets	St. Louis Blues	cash
3	10	Francois Leroux	Pittsburgh Penguins	Ottawa Senators	cash
4	11	Sheldon Kennedy	Calgary Flames	Winnipeg Jets	cash
4	12	Wayne McBean	Pittsburgh Penguins	Winnipeg Jets	cash
5	13	Roger Johansson	Chicago Blackhawks	Calgary Flames	cash
5	14	Doug Brown	Detroit Red Wings	Pittsburgh Penguins	claim: Micah Aivazoff
6	15	Micah Aivazoff	Edmonton Oilers	Pittsburgh Penguins	cash
6	16	Greg Gilbert	St. Louis Blues	New York Rangers	cash
6	17	Mike Hudson	Pittsburgh Penguins	New York Rangers	cash

=== 1995 ===
The 1995 NHL waiver draft was held on October 2, 1995. Eight selections were made.

Round	Pick	Player	Claimed by	Claimed from	Compensation
1	1	Jim McKenzie	Winnipeg Jets	New York Islanders	cash
2	2	Ted Drury	Ottawa Senators	Hartford Whalers	cash
2	3	Bill Huard	Dallas Stars	Colorado Avalanche	cash
2	4	Brent Hughes	Buffalo Sabres	Boston Bruins	cash
2	5	Pat Jablonski	St. Louis Blues	Toronto Maple Leafs	cash
3	6	Justin Hocking	Ottawa Senators	Los Angeles Kings	cash
3	7	Rob Conn	Buffalo Sabres	New Jersey Devils	cash
4	8	Bob Sweeney	New York Islanders	Buffalo Sabres	cash

=== 1996 ===
The 1996 NHL waiver draft was held on September 30, 1996. Nine selections were made. Protection lists were released prior to the draft.

Round	Pick	Player	Claimed by	Claimed from	Compensation
1	1	Rob DiMaio	San Jose Sharks	Philadelphia Flyers	cash
1	2	Jim Dowd	New York Islanders	Vancouver Canucks	cash
2	3	Corey Foster	New York Islanders	Pittsburgh Penguins	cash
2	4	Bob Corkum	Phoenix Coyotes	Philadelphia Flyers	cash
2	5	Alexander Semak	Vancouver Canucks	New York Islanders	cash
2	6	Dean Malkoc	Boston Bruins	Vancouver Canucks	cash
2	7	Craig Billington	Colorado Avalanche	Florida Panthers	cash
3	8	Chris Joseph	Vancouver Canucks	Pittsburgh Penguins	cash
3	9	Ralph Intranuovo	Toronto Maple Leafs	Edmonton Oilers	cash

=== 1997 ===
The 1997 NHL waiver draft was held on September 28, 1997. Nine selections were made. Protection lists were released prior to the draft.

Round	Pick	Player	Claimed by	Claimed from	Compensation
1	1	Tim Taylor	Boston Bruins	Detroit Red Wings	cash
1	2	Tom Chorske	New York Islanders	Ottawa Senators	cash
1	3	Mike Peluso	Calgary Flames	New York Rangers	cash
2	4	Robert Lang	Boston Bruins	Pittsburgh Penguins	cash
2	5	Mick Vukota	Tampa Bay Lightning	New York Islanders	cash
2	6	Pascal Rheaume	St. Louis Blues	New Jersey Devils	cash
2	7	Jimmy Waite	Phoenix Coyotes	Chicago Blackhawks	cash
2	8	Brent Severyn	Mighty Ducks of Anaheim	Colorado Avalanche	cash
2	9	Scott Daniels	New Jersey Devils	Philadelphia Flyers	cash

=== 1998 ===
The 1998 NHL waiver draft was held on October 5, 1998. Nine selections were made. Protection lists were released two days prior to the draft.

Round	Pick	Player	Claimed by	Claimed from	Compensation
1	1	Zdeno Ciger	Nashville Predators	Edmonton Oilers	cash
1	2	Brent Gilchrist	Tampa Bay Lightning	Detroit Red Wings	cash
1	3	Pascal Trepanier	Mighty Ducks of Anaheim	Colorado Avalanche	cash
1	4	Dennis Bonvie	Chicago Blackhawks	Edmonton Oilers	cash
1	5	Kevin Dahl	Toronto Maple Leafs	St. Louis Blues	cash
2	6	Frederic Chabot	Montreal Canadiens	Los Angeles Kings	cash
2	7	Maxim Galanov	Pittsburgh Penguins	New York Rangers	cash
3	8	Rory Fitzpatrick	Boston Bruins	St. Louis Blues	cash
3	9	Kip Miller	Pittsburgh Penguins	New York Islanders	cash

=== 1999 ===
The 1999 NHL waiver draft was held on September 27, 1999. Ten selections were made. Protection lists were released prior to the draft.

Round	Pick	Player	Claimed by	Claimed from	Compensation
1	1	Ladislav Kohn	Atlanta Thrashers	Toronto Maple Leafs	cash
1	2	Vyacheslav Butsayev	Tampa Bay Lightning	Ottawa Senators	cash
1	3	Chris Joseph	Vancouver Canucks	Ottawa Senators	cash
1	4	Jamie Rivers	New York Islanders	St. Louis Blues	cash
1	5	Ken Sutton	Washington Capitals	New Jersey Devils	cash
1	6	Rich Brennan	Los Angeles Kings	Nashville Predators	cash
2	7	Jeff Williams	Atlanta Thrashers	New Jersey Devils	cash
2	8	Evgeny Namestnikov	Vancouver Canucks	New York Rangers	cash
2	9	Terry Yake	St. Louis Blues	Atlanta Thrashers	cash
3	10	Ladislav Benysek	Mighty Ducks of Anaheim	Edmonton Oilers	cash

=== 2000 ===
The 2000 NHL waiver draft was held on September 29, 2000. Five selections were made. Protection lists were released two days prior to the draft.

Round	Pick	Player	Claimed by	Claimed from	Compensation
1	1	Zdeno Ciger	Minnesota Wild	Nashville Predators	cash
1	2	Jason Podollan	Tampa Bay Lightning	Los Angeles Kings	cash
1	3	Andreas Johansson	New York Rangers	Calgary Flames	cash
2	4	Sylvain Blouin	Minnesota Wild	Montreal Canadiens	cash
2	5	Jeff Odgers	Atlanta Thrashers	Minnesota Wild	cash

=== 2001 ===
The 2001 NHL waiver draft was held on September 28, 2001. Eights selections were made and nine players total changed teams. Protection lists were released two days prior to the draft.

Round	Pick	Player	Claimed by	Claimed from	Compensation
1	1	Chris Osgood	New York Islanders	Detroit Red Wings	cash
1	2	Sebastien Bordeleau	Minnesota Wild	St. Louis Blues	cash
1	3	Kirk Muller	Columbus Blue Jackets	Dallas Stars	cash
1	4	Jamie Allison	Calgary Flames	Chicago Blackhawks	claim: Phil Housley
1	5	P. J. Stock	Boston Bruins	New York Rangers	cash
2	6	Glen Metropolit	Tampa Bay Lightning	Washington Capitals	cash
2	7	Josh Holden	Carolina Hurricanes	Vancouver Canucks	cash
2	8	Martin Brochu	Vancouver Canucks	Minnesota Wild	cash

=== 2002 ===
The 2002 NHL waiver draft was held on October 4, 2002. Six selections were made. Protection lists were released two days prior to the draft.

Round	Pick	Player	Claimed by	Claimed from	Compensation
1	1	Stephane Robidas	Atlanta Thrashers	Montreal Canadiens	cash
1	2	Mathieu Biron	Columbus Blue Jackets	Tampa Bay Lightning	cash
1	3	Petr Tenkrat	Florida Panthers	Nashville Predators	cash
1	4	Francis Bouillon	Nashville Predators	Montreal Canadiens	cash
1	5	Ronald Petrovicky	New York Rangers	Calgary Flames	cash
1	6	Rick Berry	Washington Capitals	Pittsburgh Penguins	cash

=== 2003 ===
The 2003 NHL waiver draft was held on October 3, 2003. 18 selections were made and 20 players total changed teams. Protection lists were released two days prior to the draft.

Round	Pick	Player	Claimed by	Claimed from	Compensation
1	1	Nolan Baumgartner	Pittsburgh Penguins	Vancouver Canucks	cash
1	2	Travis Green	Columbus Blue Jackets	Toronto Maple Leafs	claim: Petr Tenkrat
1	3	Wade Brookbank	Nashville Predators	Ottawa Senators	cash
1	4	Serge Aubin	Atlanta Thrashers	Colorado Avalanche	cash
1	5	Darren Langdon	Montreal Canadiens	Vancouver Canucks	cash
1	6	Sheldon Keefe	New York Rangers	Tampa Bay Lightning	cash
2	7	Chris Mason	Nashville Predators	Florida Panthers	cash
2	8	Ronald Petrovicky	Atlanta Thrashers	New York Rangers	cash
2	9	Steve Begin	Montreal Canadiens	Buffalo Sabres	cash
2	10	Brian Willsie	Washington Capitals	Colorado Avalanche	cash
2	11	Todd Simpson	Mighty Ducks of Anaheim	Phoenix Coyotes	cash
2	12	Jeff Heerema	St. Louis Blues	New York Rangers	cash
3	13	Steve Valiquette	Florida Panthers	Edmonton Oilers	cash
3	14	Shawn Heins	Atlanta Thrashers	New York Rangers	cash
3	15	Joel Bouchard	New York Rangers	Buffalo Sabres	cash
3	16	Denis Hamel	Washington Capitals	Ottawa Senators	claim: Glen Metropolit
4	17	Jani Hurme	Carolina Hurricanes	Florida Panthers	cash
4	18	Mike Siklenka	New York Rangers	Philadelphia Flyers	cash

== See also ==
- Waivers (NHL)
