= Jeff Brubaker =

American ice hockey player (born 1958)

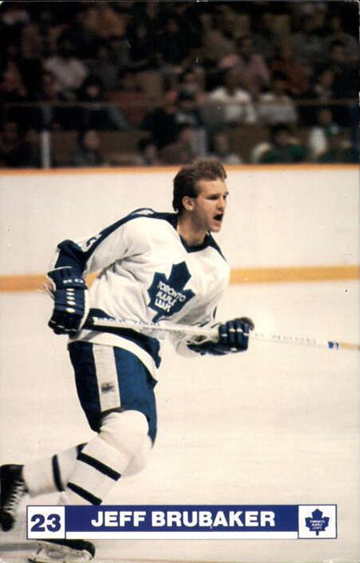
- Brubaker in 1985 postcard
- Born: February 24, 1958 (age 68) Hagerstown, Maryland, U.S.
- Height: 6 ft 2 in (188 cm)
- Weight: 207 lb (94 kg; 14 st 11 lb)
- Position: Left wing
- Shot: Left
- Played for: New England Whalers; Hartford Whalers; Montreal Canadiens; Calgary Flames; Toronto Maple Leafs; Edmonton Oilers; New York Rangers; Detroit Red Wings
- NHL draft: 102nd overall, 1978; Boston Bruins
- Playing career: 1978–1989

Jeffrey Joseph Brubaker (born February 24, 1958) is an American former professional ice hockey forward.

Brubaker was the first Maryland native to play in the NHL although he grew up and learned to play hockey in Lansing, Michigan. He started his National Hockey League career with the Hartford Whalers in 1979. He would also play with the Montreal Canadiens, Calgary Flames, Toronto Maple Leafs, Edmonton Oilers, New York Rangers, and Detroit Red Wings. He retired after the 1989 season.

Brubaker began his coaching career in the ECHL with the 1989-90 Greensboro Monarchs, with his team winning the league championship that same year.

== Career statistics ==
			Regular season					Playoffs
Season	Team	League	GP	G	A	Pts	PIM	GP	G	A	Pts	PIM
1974–75	St. Paul Vulcans	MidJHL	57	13	14	27	130	—	—	—	—	—
1975–76	St. Paul Vulcans	MidJHL	47	6	34	40	152	—	—	—	—	—
1976–77	Michigan State University	NCAA	18	0	3	3	30	—	—	—	—	—
1976–77	Peterborough Petes	QMJHL	26	0	5	5	143	4	0	2	2	7
1977–78	Peterborough Petes	QMJHL	68	20	24	44	307	21	6	5	11	52
1978–79	Rochester Americans	AHL	57	4	10	14	253	—	—	—	—	—
1978–79	New England Whalers	WHA	12	0	0	0	19	3	0	0	0	12
1979–80	Hartford Whalers	NHL	3	0	1	1	2	—	—	—	—	—
1979–80	Springfield Indians	AHL	50	12	13	25	165	—	—	—	—	—
1980–81	Hartford Whalers	NHL	43	5	3	8	93	—	—	—	—	—
1980–81	Binghamton Whalers	AHL	33	18	11	29	138	—	—	—	—	—
1981–82	Montreal Canadiens	NHL	3	0	1	1	32	2	0	0	0	27
1981–82	Nova Scotia Voyageurs	AHL	60	28	12	40	156	6	2	1	3	32
1982–83	Nova Scotia Voyageurs	AHL	78	31	27	58	183	7	1	1	2	25
1983–84	Calgary Flames	NHL	4	0	0	0	19	—	—	—	—	—
1983–84	Colorado Flames	CHL	57	16	19	35	218	6	3	1	4	15
1984–85	Toronto Maple Leafs	NHL	68	8	4	12	209	—	—	—	—	—
1985–86	Toronto Maple Leafs	NHL	21	0	0	0	67	—	—	—	—	—
1985–86	Edmonton Oilers	NHL	4	1	0	1	12	—	—	—	—	—
1985–86	Nova Scotia Oilers	AHL	19	4	3	7	41	—	—	—	—	—
1986–87	Nova Scotia Oilers	AHL	47	10	16	26	80	—	—	—	—	—
1986–87	Hershey Bears	AHL	12	1	2	3	30	3	2	0	2	10
1987–88	New York Rangers	NHL	31	2	0	2	78	—	—	—	—	—
1987–88	Colorado Rangers	IHL	30	12	10	22	53	13	2	2	4	21
1988–89	Detroit Red Wings	NHL	1	0	0	0	0	—	—	—	—	—
1988–89	Adirondack Red Wings	AHL	63	3	10	13	137	—	—	—	—	—
WHA totals			12	0	0	0	19	3	0	0	0	12
NHL totals			178	16	9	25	512	2	0	0	0	27
