= John Van Boxmeer =

Canadian ice hockey player, coach (born 1952)

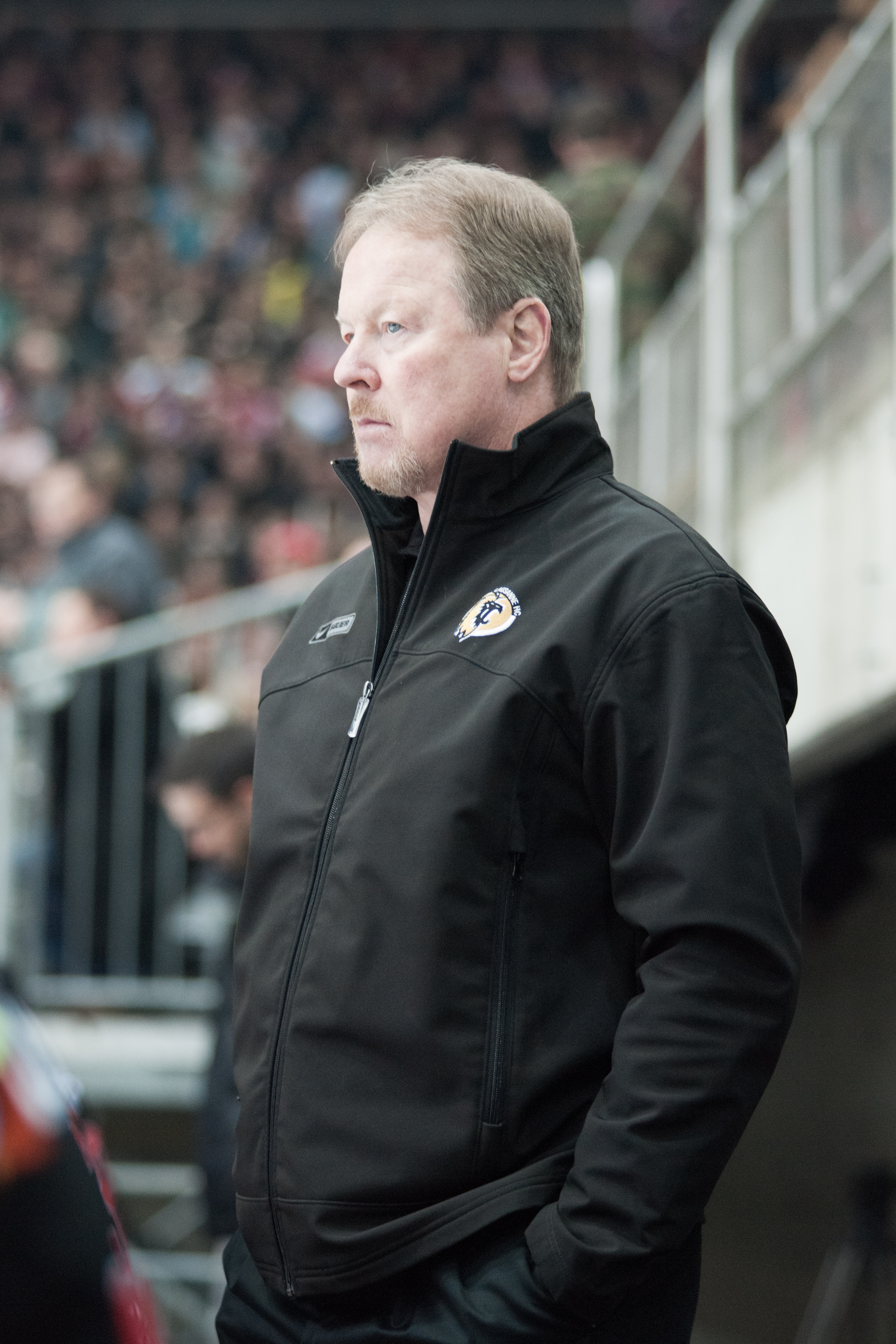
- Born: November 20, 1952 (age 73) Petrolia, Ontario, Canada
- Height: 6 ft 0 in (183 cm)
- Weight: 190 lb (86 kg; 13 st 8 lb)
- Position: Defence
- Shot: Right
- Played for: Montreal Canadiens; Colorado Rockies; Buffalo Sabres; Quebec Nordiques
- National team: Canada
- NHL draft: 14th overall, 1972; Montreal Canadiens
- Playing career: 1972–1984
Medal record
Representing Canada
World Championships
Bronze medal – third place	1982 Finland

John Martin Van Boxmeer (born November 20, 1952) is a Canadian former professional ice hockey player. He also worked extensively as a hockey coach and scout after his playing career ended in 1984.

== Biography ==
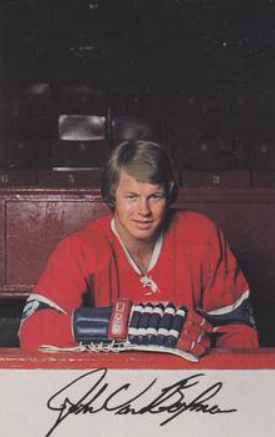
1974 card of John Van Boxmeer for Montreal Canadiens

John Van Boxmeer was considered a top prospect and was drafted as the 14th overall pick by the Montreal Canadiens in 1972. He was so highly regarded that he began his professional career by travelling to Moscow for the 1972 Summit Series at the request of tournament organizer Alan Eagleson, although he did not play in the famous series. He played 46 games for the Stanley Cup champion Canadiens in 1975–76, but his name was left off the cup as he did not appear in the playoffs. Ultimately, Van Boxmeer had a tough time making a Montreal lineup that was very deep in talent, and rather than spend the majority of his time in the minor leagues, he requested a trade. He was dealt to the Colorado Rockies in 1976 in exchange for a third-round pick in the 1979 NHL Draft, which the Canadiens used to draft Craig Levie.

In Colorado, Van Boxmeer finally received the opportunity to establish himself as a full-time NHL player. He played all 80 games in the 1977–78 season, the only time the Rockies qualified for the playoffs in their history. When former Canadiens coach Scotty Bowman moved to the Buffalo Sabres, he acquired Van Boxmeer to bolster the Sabres' blueline, recalling how he had reluctantly traded the defenceman in 1976. To do so, he broke up the Sabres' famed "French Connection" line, sending René Robert to Colorado. Van Boxmeer responded with a plus-40 season and helped the Sabres climb to first place in their division, and the defenseman's best statistical seasons as a pro were in Buffalo.

With the emergence of Phil Housley on the Buffalo blueline, Van Boxmeer became expendable, and he was claimed by the Quebec Nordiques in the 1983 NHL Waiver Draft. He spent the majority of his time during the 1983–84 season in the American Hockey League, and played his final game with the Rochester Americans in 1984 before retiring.

Since retiring, he has served as the head coach of the Rochester Americans and the Long Beach Ice Dogs, and has also been an assistant coach at the NHL level with the Buffalo Sabres and Los Angeles Kings. He won the Calder Cup as the head coach of Rochester in the 1986–87 season. He served as head coach of SC Bern of Switzerland's Nationalliga A until March 2009.

Van Boxmeer suffered a heart attack in August 2008, but recovered quickly and returned behind the SC Bern bench. He was a scout for the Buffalo Sabres until 2020.

Van Boxmeer's son, Hank, was a defenceman who played for the State University of New York at Oswego Lakers. His daughter, Ashley, played college softball for the Cal State Fullerton Titans and for Canada at the 2008 Summer Olympics in Beijing.

== Career statistics ==
=== Regular season and playoffs ===
			Regular season					Playoffs
Season	Team	League	GP	G	A	Pts	PIM	GP	G	A	Pts	PIM
1971–72	Guelph CMC's	SOJHL	56	30	42	72	160	—	—	—	—	—
1972–73	Nova Scotia Voyageurs	AHL	76	5	29	34	139	13	1	6	7	26
1973–74	Montreal Canadiens	NHL	20	1	4	5	18	1	0	0	0	0
1973–74	Nova Scotia Voyageurs	AHL	47	8	20	28	78	—	—	—	—	—
1974–75	Montreal Canadiens	NHL	9	0	2	2	0	—	—	—	—	—
1974–75	Nova Scotia Voyageurs	AHL	43	4	15	19	68	6	1	3	4	9
1975–76	Montreal Canadiens	NHL	46	6	11	17	31	—	—	—	—	—
1976–77	Montreal Canadiens	NHL	4	0	1	1	0	—	—	—	—	—
1976–77	Colorado Rockies	NHL	41	2	11	13	32	—	—	—	—	—
1977–78	Colorado Rockies	NHL	80	12	42	54	87	2	0	1	1	2
1978–79	Colorado Rockies	NHL	76	9	34	43	46	—	—	—	—	—
1979–80	Buffalo Sabres	NHL	80	11	40	51	55	14	3	5	8	12
1980–81	Buffalo Sabres	NHL	80	18	51	69	69	8	1	8	9	7
1981–82	Buffalo Sabres	NHL	69	14	54	68	62	4	0	1	1	6
1982–83	Buffalo Sabres	NHL	65	6	21	27	53	9	1	0	1	10
1983–84	Quebec Nordiques	NHL	18	5	3	8	12	—	—	—	—	—
1983–84	Fredericton Express	AHL	45	10	34	44	48	7	2	5	7	8
1984–85	Rochester Americans	AHL	2	0	0	0	2	—	—	—	—	—
NHL totals			588	84	274	358	465	38	5	15	20	37

=== International ===
Year	Team	Event	GP	G	A	Pts	PIM
1982	Canada	WC	8	2	0	2	8

Preceded by Dave Gardner	Montreal Canadiens first-round draft pick 1972	Succeeded by Bob Gainey
