= Macon Whoopee (ECHL) =

Professional ice hockey team in Georgia, United States from 2001 to 2002

- City: Macon, Georgia
- League: ECHL
- Founded: 1981 (In the CHL)
- Operated: 2001–2002
- Home arena: Macon Coliseum
- Head coach: Gord Dineen

Franchise history
- 1981–1983: Nashville South Stars
- 1983–1990: Virginia Lancers
- 1990–1992: Roanoke Valley Rebels
- 1992–1993: Roanoke Valley Rampage
- 1993–1994: Huntsville Blast
- 1994–2001: Tallahassee Tiger Sharks
- 2001–2002: Macon Whoopee
- 2002–2003: Lexington Men O' War
- 2005–2026: Utah Grizzlies
- 2026-present: Trenton Ironhawks

The Macon Whoopee were a professional ice hockey team that played in the East Coast Hockey League (ECHL) during the 2001–02 season. Based in Macon, Georgia, the team played its home games at Macon Coliseum. They were owned by Elmore Sports Group.

== History ==
Prior to the 2001–02 ECHL season, the Tallahassee Tiger Sharks were moved by their owners, Elmore Sports Group, from Tallahassee, Florida to Macon, Georgia to begin play as the Macon Whoopee. Coached by former NHL defenceman Gord Dineen, the team compiled a record of 29 wins, 31 losses, and 12 ties to finish out of the playoffs in their only season of play in Macon.

Following the 2001–02 season, the franchise was relocated to Lexington, Kentucky to play as the Lexington Men O' War.
