= Alex Foster (ice hockey) =

American ice hockey player (born 1984)

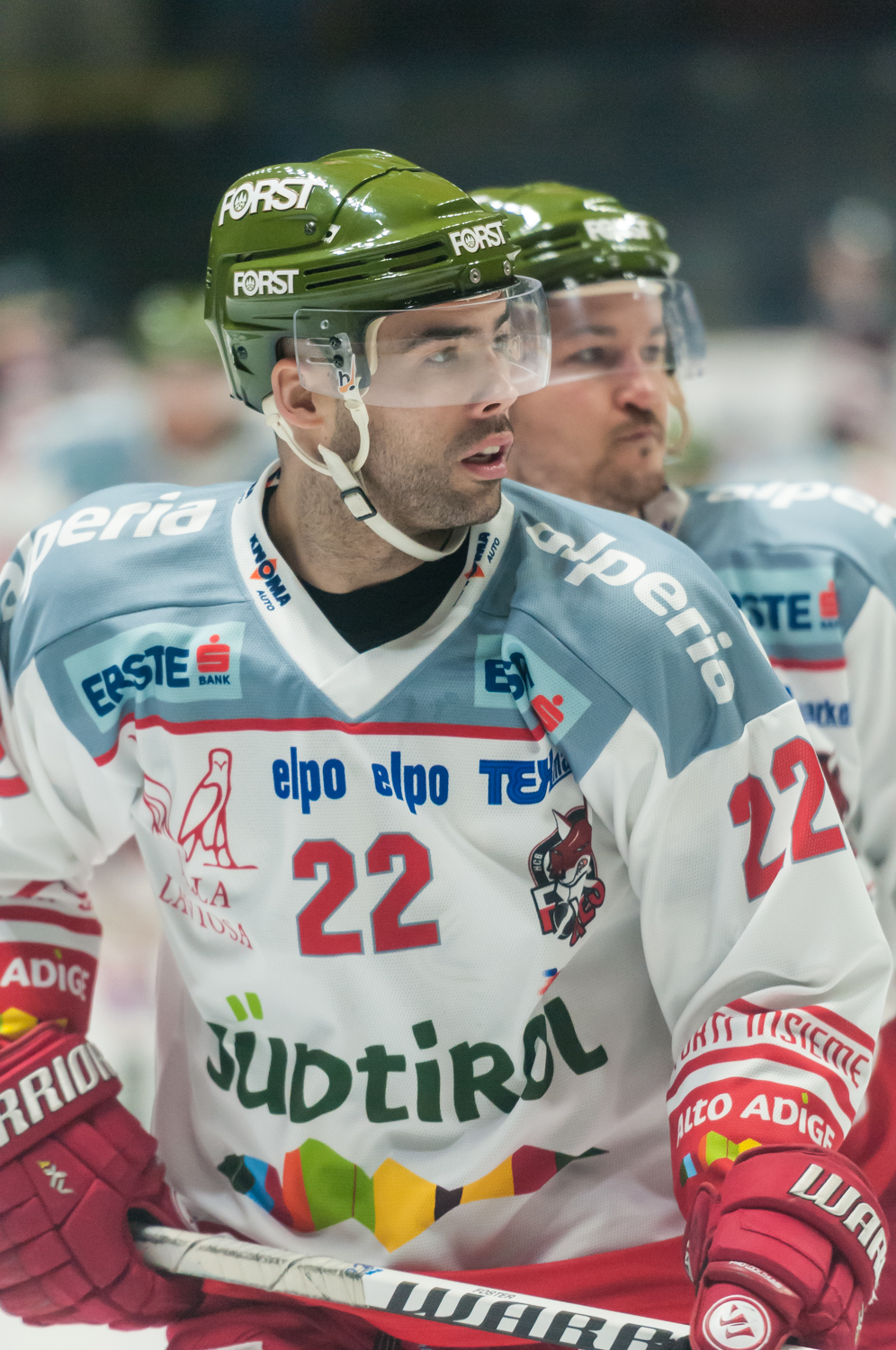
- Born: August 26, 1984 (age 42) Canton, Michigan, U.S.
- Height: 6 ft 0 in (183 cm)
- Weight: 200 lb (91 kg; 14 st 4 lb)
- Position: Left wing
- Shot: Left
- Played for: Toronto Maple Leafs; HC Sparta Praha; Adler Mannheim; Iserlohn Roosters; HC Bolzano; Belfast Giants
- NHL draft: Undrafted
- Playing career: 2006–2018

Alexander Dwight Foster (born August 26, 1984) is an American former professional ice hockey forward who last played with the Brampton Beast of the ECHL.

He is the son of former National Hockey League (NHL) player Dwight Foster and nephew of former NHL player Wes Jarvis. Prior to advancing to the professional ranks, Foster played both junior hockey and college hockey. He played his collegiate hockey at Bowling Green State University. After leaving college in 2006, he signed with the Toronto Maple Leafs, with whom he played three games, while mostly playing for their farm team, the Toronto Marlies.

== Early life ==
Foster was born August 26, 1984, in Canton, Michigan, to parents Dwight and Maryann Foster. He has two brothers and one sister. His father, Dwight, played in the NHL, as did his uncle, Wes Jarvis.

As a youth, Foster played in the 1998 Quebec International Pee-Wee Hockey Tournament with the Detroit Compuware minor ice hockey team. He graduated from Salem High School in 2002.

== Playing career ==
=== Amateur ===
Foster played junior hockey in the USHL for three seasons. He played the 2001–02 and 2002–03 seasons with the Sioux Falls Stampede and the 2002–03 and 2003–04 seasons with the Danville Wings. In his time with the Wings, he helped lead them to the final four of the USHL playoffs.

Foster joined the Bowling Green Falcons ice hockey team in 2004. During his time at Bowling Green, Foster amassed 82 points in 72 games and ranks 10th all-time at BGSU in assists-per-game, averaging .875. In his freshman season (2004–05) he was named CCHA Rookie of the Week on January 9, 2005. He finished the season as the ninth-highest scoring freshman in the conference.

In his sophomore (2005–06) season, Foster tallied 51 points in 38 games. He was named CCHA Player of the Month for November 2005, Offensive Player of the Week on November 7, 2005 and was a Hobey Baker Award candidate.

=== Professional ===
Foster was signed as a free agent by the Toronto Maple Leafs on March 8, 2006. His contract included the maximum possible signing bonus, which was approximately US$170,000. Foster was assigned to Toronto's AHL minors team, the Toronto Marlies, the next day. In his rookie (2005–06) season with the Marlies, Foster scored one goal in eight games. On October 16, 2006, Foster was reassigned to the Columbia Inferno of the ECHL, later to be recalled to the Toronto Marlies (AHL) on November 11, 2006. Foster re-signed with the Toronto Marlies on July 18, 2007, with a one-year contract.

On February 24, 2008, Foster established a Toronto Marlies single season record for short-handed goals when he scored his fifth short-handed goal of the season against the Hamilton Bulldogs.

On March 17, 2008, Foster was called up to the Toronto Maple Leafs and made his NHL debut the following night against the New York Islanders, wearing jersey #32. He would appear in three games before being reassigned to the Toronto Marlies on March 26, 2008. In his three games he totaled one shot, no points, and no penalty minutes.

On October 22, 2010, Foster was named the third captain in Toronto Marlies' history.

On June 7, 2011, after spending his 6th professional season within the Maple Leafs organization, Foster left as a free agent and signed a one-year contract with the European team HC Sparta Praha of the Czech Extraliga. He spent the 2012–13 season split between HC Sparta Praha of the Czech Extraliga and Adler Mannheim of the Deutsche Eishockey Liga.

On June 20, 2013, Foster opted to remain in Germany to sign a one-year contract with the Iserlohn Roosters of the DEL.

After six years abroad playing across Europe, Foster returned to the United States as a free agent following the 2016–17 season with the Belfast Giants of the Elite Ice Hockey League. On September 22, 2017, he agreed to a one-year ECHL contract with the Toledo Walleye. Prior to playing in the 2017–18 season, Foster was released from his contract with the Walleye and later signed by fellow ECHL club, the Rapid City Rush, on October 17, 2017. After opening the season with 5 games for the Rush, Foster was traded to the Brampton Beast on November 11, 2017.

== Career statistics ==
			Regular season					Playoffs
Season	Team	League	GP	G	A	Pts	PIM	GP	G	A	Pts	PIM
2001–02	Sioux Falls Stampede	USHL	57	6	15	21	72	3	0	1	1	8
2002–03	Sioux Falls Stampede	USHL	5	0	1	1	0	—	—	—	—	—
2003–04	Danville Wings	USHL	55	23	30	53	91	6	1	2	3	6
2004–05	BGSU Falcons	CCHA	34	8	23	31	33	2	1	3	4	0
2005–06	BGSU Falcons	CCHA	38	11	40	51	40	2	0	0	0	2
2005–06	Toronto Marlies	AHL	8	1	0	1	6	—	—	—	—	—
2005–06	Columbia Inferno	ECHL	9	1	10	11	6	—	—	—	—	—
2006–07	Toronto Marlies	AHL	58	8	9	17	31	—	—	—	—	—
2007–08	Toronto Marlies	AHL	67	18	28	46	30	19	2	6	8	12
2007–08	Toronto Maple Leafs	NHL	3	0	0	0	0	—	—	—	—	—
2008–09	Toronto Marlies	AHL	80	12	23	35	88	6	2	3	5	8
2009–10	Toronto Marlies	AHL	30	9	8	17	10	—	—	—	—	—
2010–11	Toronto Marlies	AHL	70	10	24	34	28	—	—	—	—	—
2011–12	HC Sparta Praha	CZE	52	11	12	23	34	5	1	1	2	20
2012–13	HC Sparta Praha	CZE	31	3	2	5	45	—	—	—	—	—
2012–13	Adler Mannheim	DEL	10	1	1	2	10	4	0	1	1	6
2013–14	Iserlohn Roosters	DEL	52	13	28	41	26	9	1	3	4	8
2014–15	Iserlohn Roosters	DEL	50	10	24	34	65	7	3	1	4	2
2015–16	Bolzano HC	EBEL	49	9	16	25	18	6	1	2	3	19
2016–17	Belfast Giants	EIHL	36	10	18	28	10	1	0	0	0	0
2017–18	Rapid City Rush	ECHL	5	0	1	1	2	—	—	—	—	—
2017–18	Brampton Beast	ECHL	61	15	23	38	34	—	—	—	—	—
NHL totals			3	0	0	0	0	—	—	—	—	—

== Awards and honors ==
Award	Year
All-CCHA Second team	2006
