= Chris Taylor (ice hockey) =

Canadian ice hockey player & coach (born 1972)

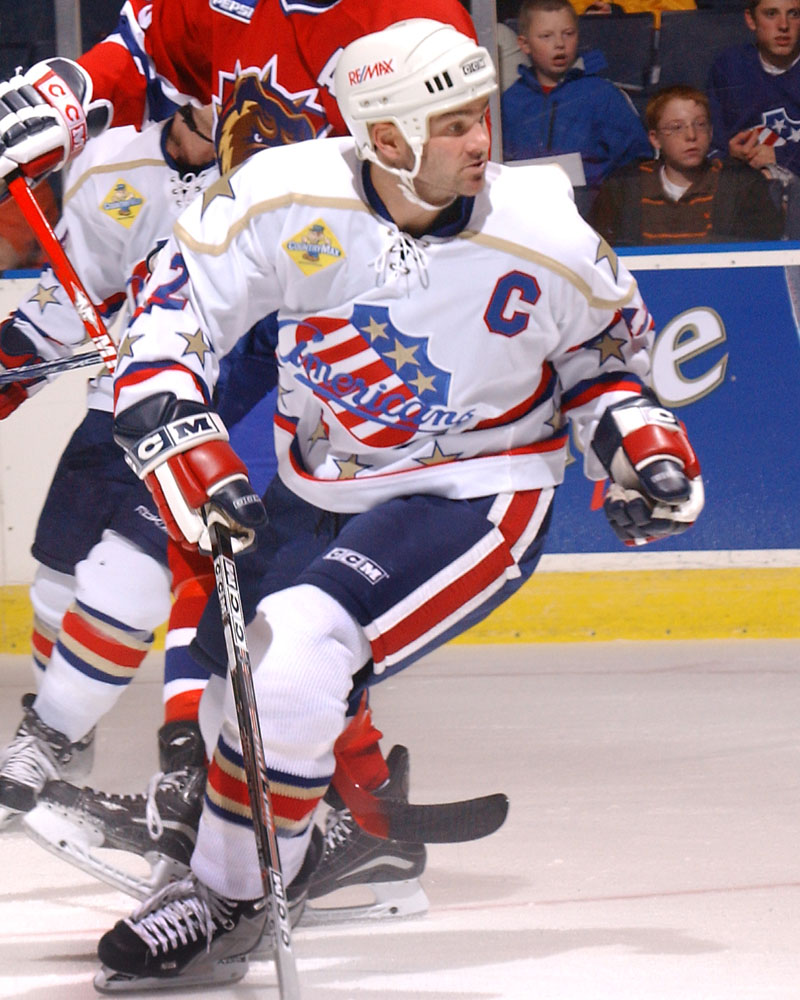
- Taylor with the Rochester Americans in 2005
- Born: March 6, 1972 (age 54) Stratford, Ontario, Canada
- Height: 6 ft 0 in (183 cm)
- Weight: 190 lb (86 kg; 13 st 8 lb)
- Position: Centre
- Shot: Left
- Played for: New York Islanders; Boston Bruins; Buffalo Sabres; Frankfurt Lions
- NHL draft: 27th overall, 1990; New York Islanders
- Playing career: 1992–2011

Chris Taylor (born March 6, 1972) is a Canadian former professional ice hockey player who is currently an assistant coach with the Seattle Kraken of the National Hockey League (NHL). He played in 149 NHL games with the New York Islanders, Boston Bruins, and Buffalo Sabres. In 2017, Taylor was named the head coach of the Rochester Americans in the American Hockey League, the affiliate of the Buffalo Sabres. In 2019, he was recalled by the Sabres as an assistant coach on an interim basis and returned to the Americans in late November, staying until June 2020.

== Playing career ==
Taylor had an impressive junior career with the London Knights, ending his tenure with the team as their all-time points leader with 378 (later surpassed by Corey Perry with 380 points) and was drafted by the New York Islanders in the 1990 NHL Entry Draft (2nd round, 27th overall) He then played for the Islanders, Boston Bruins, and Buffalo Sabres in the National Hockey League, but was frequently sent between the NHL and the minor leagues before going overseas with the Frankfurt Lions of Germany's Deutsche Eishockey Liga before the 2006–07 season.

On July 16, 2009, Taylor agreed to a two-year contract with the Rochester Americans of the American Hockey League, a team he had played for from 1999 to 2006 while he was signed to their NHL affiliate, the Buffalo Sabres.

== Coaching career ==
On August 31, 2011, the Rochester Americans announced that Taylor had been hired as their development coach for the 2011–12 season. Later that season, he was promoted to an assistant coach. On June 6, 2016, incoming Rochester head coach, Dan Lambert, opted not to retain Taylor on the Americans' staff. Taylor subsequently joined the Wilkes-Barre/Scranton Penguins, AHL affiliate of the Pittsburgh Penguins, as an assistant coach on August 2, 2016.

On June 30, 2017, Taylor was named head coach of the Rochester Americans. A few days before the start of the 2019–20 season, Taylor was called up by the Buffalo Sabres as an interim assistant coach when Don Granato was forced to take a medical leave of absence from the Sabres.

On June 16, 2020, Taylor was relieved of his duties as coach, along with Amerks general manager, Randy Sexton, and assistant coaches Gord Dineen and Toby Petersen. Taylor led the Amerks to a 116-65-33 record across three seasons as head coach.

On October 23, 2020, he was hired as an assistant coach by the New Jersey Devils.

On June 17, 2025, he was hired as an assistant coach by the Seattle Kraken.

== Career statistics ==
=== Regular season and playoffs ===
			Regular season					Playoffs
Season	Team	League	GP	G	A	Pts	PIM	GP	G	A	Pts	PIM
1988–89	London Knights	OHL	62	7	16	23	52	15	0	2	2	15
1989–90	London Knights	OHL	66	45	60	105	60	6	3	2	5	16
1990–91	London Knights	OHL	65	50	78	128	50	7	4	8	12	6
1991–92	London Knights	OHL	66	48	74	122	57	10	8	16	24	9
1992–93	Capital District Islanders	AHL	77	19	43	62	32	4	0	1	1	2
1993–94	Salt Lake Golden Eagles	IHL	79	21	20	41	38	—	—	—	—	—
1994–95	New York Islanders	NHL	10	0	3	3	2	—	—	—	—	—
1994–95	Denver Grizzlies	IHL	78	38	48	86	47	14	7	6	13	10
1995–96	New York Islanders	NHL	11	0	1	1	2	—	—	—	—	—
1995–96	Utah Grizzlies	IHL	50	18	23	41	60	22	5	11	16	26
1996–97	New York Islanders	NHL	1	0	0	0	0	—	—	—	—	—
1996–97	Utah Grizzlies	IHL	71	27	40	67	24	7	1	2	3	0
1997–98	Utah Grizzlies	IHL	79	28	56	84	66	4	0	2	2	6
1998–99	Providence Bruins	AHL	21	6	11	17	6	—	—	—	—	—
1998–99	Boston Bruins	NHL	37	3	5	8	12	—	—	—	—	—
1998–99	Las Vegas Thunder	IHL	14	3	12	15	2	—	—	—	—	—
1999–00	Rochester Americans	AHL	49	21	28	49	21	—	—	—	—	—
1999–00	Buffalo Sabres	NHL	11	1	1	2	2	2	0	0	0	2
2000–01	Rochester Americans	AHL	45	20	24	44	25	—	—	—	—	—
2000–01	Buffalo Sabres	NHL	14	0	2	2	6	—	—	—	—	—
2001–02	Rochester Americans	AHL	77	21	45	66	66	2	0	1	1	0
2002–03	Rochester Americans	AHL	61	12	55	67	44	3	3	1	4	2
2002–03	Buffalo Sabres	NHL	11	1	3	4	2	—	—	—	—	—
2003–04	Buffalo Sabres	NHL	54	6	6	12	22	—	—	—	—	—
2003–04	Rochester Americans	AHL	24	9	18	27	20	16	5	12	17	0
2004–05	Rochester Americans	AHL	79	21	58	79	50	9	1	8	9	4
2005–06	Rochester Americans	AHL	32	11	26	37	34	—	—	—	—	—
2006–07	Frankfurt Lions	DEL	52	12	34	46	80	8	1	9	10	8
2007–08	Frankfurt Lions	DEL	56	17	49	66	48	12	5	8	13	6
2008–09	Frankfurt Lions	DEL	52	15	34	49	60	5	0	3	3	4
2009–10	Rochester Americans	AHL	80	17	44	61	89	7	1	3	4	6
2010–11	Rochester Americans	AHL	72	10	41	51	38	—	—	—	—	—
NHL totals			149	11	21	32	48	2	0	0	0	2

== Coaching record ==
Team	Year	Regular season							Postseason
Team	Year	G	W	L	T	OTL	Pts	Finish	Result
ROC	2017–18	76	37	22	-	17	91	3rd, North	Lost in Round 1
ROC	2018–19	76	46	23	-	7	99	2nd, North	Lost in Round 1
ROC	2019-20	62	33	20	-	9	75	2nd, North	Season Cancelled

== Awards and honours ==
Award	Year	Notes
AHL
Fred T. Hunt Memorial Award	2004–05	
