= Dwight Foster (ice hockey) =

Canadian ice hockey player (1957–2025)

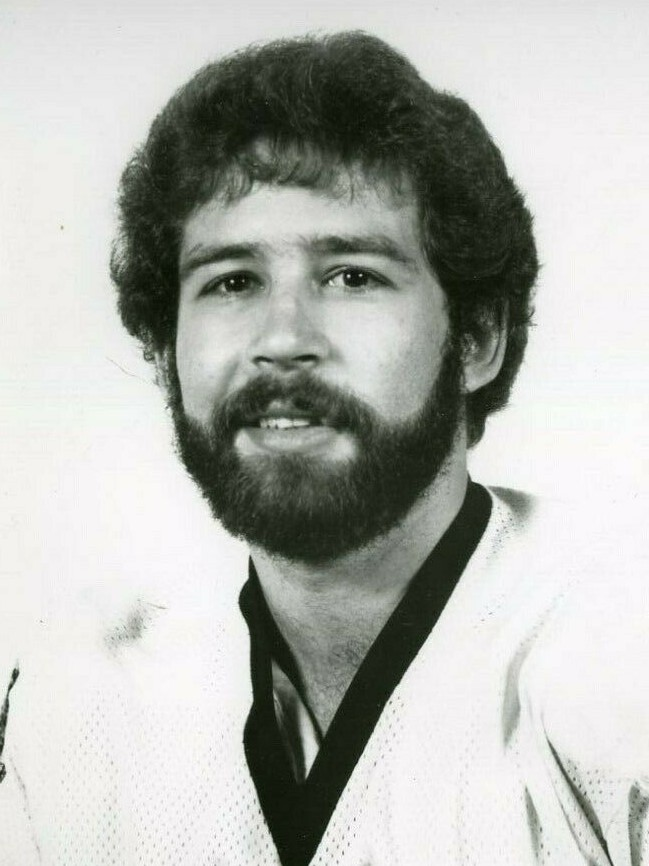
- Foster in 1980
- Born: 2 April 1957 Toronto, Ontario, Canada
- Died: 5 January 2025 (aged 67) West Bloomfield Township, Michigan, USA
- Height: 5 ft 11 in (180 cm)
- Weight: 190 lb (86 kg; 13 st 8 lb)
- Position: Right wing
- Shot: Right
- Played for: Boston Bruins; Colorado Rockies; New Jersey Devils; Detroit Red Wings
- NHL draft: 16th overall, 1977; Boston Bruins
- WHA draft: 10th overall, 1977; Houston Aeros
- Playing career: 1977–1987

Dwight Alexander Foster (2 April 1957 – 5 January 2025) was a Canadian professional ice hockey player. He was drafted into the National Hockey League (NHL) in the first round, 16th overall in 1977 by the Boston Bruins. Besides Boston, he played for the Colorado Rockies, New Jersey Devils and Detroit Red Wings, before retiring in 1987 because of knee injuries.

== Amateur career ==
Foster was born in Toronto, Ontario. As a youth, he played in the 1968 and 1969 Quebec International Pee-Wee Hockey Tournaments with minor ice hockey teams from Toronto.

While playing for the Kitchener Rangers, he led the tough Ontario Hockey League in scoring, Foster was a highly rated prospect going into the 1977 NHL entry draft. The New York Islanders seriously considered selecting him 15th overall, but settled on future Hall of Fame forward Mike Bossy instead. Foster was known as a strong defensive forward with marginal offensive ability (his OHL scoring title notwithstanding), while Bossy was a prolific scorer who was not very physical. In the end, Islanders coach Al Arbour convinced general manager Bill Torrey that he should pick Bossy, arguing that it was easier to teach a scorer how to check.

Foster went next to Boston. That same year, he helped Team Canada win the silver medal at the World Junior Championships.

== Professional career ==
=== Boston Bruins ===
Foster scored a goal in his first NHL game but just 14 games into the season he tore the cartilage in his left knee requiring season-ending surgery. The following year he boosted his games played to 44, with another 22 spent with the Bruins' American Hockey League (AHL) affiliate, the Rochester Americans. Foster had a hard time earning the trust of Bruins coach Don Cherry. While he dressed for all 11 playoff games that spring he was used sparingly, including a three-second appearance in Boston's Game 7 semifinal loss versus Montreal which ended their season. After splitting time between the NHL and the AHL his first three seasons, Foster finally earned a full-time job for the 1980–81 season and chipped in 24 goals and 52 points for the Bruins. Foster centred Bruins' top scorer Rick Middleton and veteran winger Stan Jonathan but the following summer Foster signed a free agent contract with the Colorado Rockies.

=== Colorado Rockies/New Jersey Devils ===
As compensation to the Bruins for signing Foster, the Rockies agreed to a trade that sent their second-round pick in the 1982 NHL entry draft to Boston along with the option to swap first-round picks in 1982. The deal proved costly for Colorado when the Rockies finished in last place, gifting the Bruins the first overall draft pick, which they used to select Gord Kluzak.

Foster struggled in Colorado while battling shoulder and groin injuries that limited his effectiveness; his goal total dropped by half from the previous season and his 31-points placed him eighth on the team. The franchise relocated to New Jersey for the following season but after just four games with the newly minted New Jersey Devils, the organization cut their losses and he was traded to the Detroit Red Wings with the Devils receiving one US dollar in exchange.

=== Detroit Red Wings ===
Injuries continued to plague Foster with the Red Wings, but he did bounce back to score 17 goals his first year in Detroit, while being limited to 58 games. It would prove to be the high-water mark for games played during his time in Detroit while he battled shoulder and knee injuries. During his fourth season with the Red Wings, he was shipped back to Boston in a late-season trade for Dave Donnelly.

=== Second stint with Boston ===
Foster was held off the score sheet in the 13 games he played for the Bruins to wrap up the 1985–86 season but he did chip in two points in three playoff games that spring. He returned to the Bruins for the 1986–87 season but struggled with just four goals in 47 games and suffered yet another knee injury that required surgery. When the Bruins did not offer him a contract for the 1987-88 campaign, Foster retired, finishing with 274 points in 541 career games.

== Personal life ==
Foster was married to Maryann and they had four children. Foster's son Alex was also a professional ice hockey player. Foster died unexpectedly on 5 January 2025, at the age of 67.

== Career statistics ==
=== Regular season and playoffs ===
			Regular season					Playoffs
Season	Team	League	GP	G	A	Pts	PIM	GP	G	A	Pts	PIM
1973–74	Kitchener Rangers	OHA	67	23	32	55	61	—	—	—	—	—
1974–75	Kitchener Rangers	OMJHL	70	39	51	90	88	—	—	—	—	—
1975–76	Kitchener Rangers	OMJHL	61	36	58	94	110	8	4	6	10	28
1976–77	Kitchener Rangers	OMJHL	64	60	83	143	88	3	2	4	6	2
1977–78	Boston Bruins	NHL	14	2	1	3	6	—	—	—	—	—
1977–78	Rochester Americans	AHL	3	0	3	3	2	—	—	—	—	—
1978–79	Boston Bruins	NHL	44	11	13	24	14	11	1	3	4	0
1978–79	Rochester Americans	AHL	21	11	18	29	8	—	—	—	—	—
1979–80	Boston Bruins	NHL	57	10	28	38	42	9	3	5	8	2
1979–80	Binghamton Dusters	AHL	7	1	3	4	2	—	—	—	—	—
1980–81	Boston Bruins	NHL	77	24	28	52	62	3	1	1	2	0
1981–82	Colorado Rockies	NHL	70	12	19	31	41	—	—	—	—	—
1982–83	Wichita Wind	CHL	2	0	1	1	2	—	—	—	—	—
1982–83	New Jersey Devils	NHL	4	0	0	0	2	—	—	—	—	—
1982–83	Detroit Red Wings	NHL	58	17	22	39	58	—	—	—	—	—
1983–84	Detroit Red Wings	NHL	52	9	12	21	50	3	0	1	1	0
1984–85	Detroit Red Wings	NHL	50	16	16	32	56	3	0	0	0	0
1985–86	Detroit Red Wings	NHL	55	6	12	18	48	—	—	—	—	—
1985–86	Boston Bruins	NHL	13	0	0	0	4	3	0	2	2	2
1986–87	Boston Bruins	NHL	47	4	12	16	37	3	0	0	0	0
NHL totals			541	111	163	274	420	35	5	12	17	4

=== International ===
Year	Team	Event	GP	G	A	Pts	PIM
1977	Canada	WJC	7	2	5	7	4
Junior totals			7	2	5	7	4

== Team records ==
- 1976–77: Most points – Kitchener Rangers (143)
- 1976–77: Most assists – Kitchener Rangers (83)
- All-time most points – Kitchener Rangers (382)
- Most goals in a game – Kitchener Rangers 1976–77 (5)

Preceded by Clayton Pachal	Boston Bruins first-round draft pick 1977	Succeeded by Al Secord
