= Scott MacLeod (ice hockey) =

Canadian ice hockey player

- Born: May 17, 1959 (age 66) Vancouver, British Columbia, Canada
- Height: 5 ft 10 in (178 cm)
- Weight: 172 lb (78 kg; 12 st 4 lb)
- Position: Centre
- Shot: Left
- Played for: Oji Seishi; Salt Lake Golden Eagles; EV Landshut; HC Merano; EHC Biel
- NHL draft: Undrafted
- Playing career: 1982–1991

Scott MacLeod (born May 17, 1959) is a Canadian retired professional ice hockey player.

== Early life ==
Born in Vancouver, British Columbia, Canada, MacLeod played junior hockey in the Western Hockey League with the Brandon Wheat Kings, New Westminster Bruins, and Calgary Wranglers. He was selected to play with Team Canada at the 1979 World Junior Ice Hockey Championships.

== Career ==
MacLeod began his professional career in 1979 with Oji Seishi in the Japan Ice Hockey League. In 1983, he joined the Salt Lake Golden Eagles for the Central Hockey League's final season of play, where he won the league's scoring title, and then stayed with the team for two more seasons in the International Hockey League, winning the IHL's scoring race both seasons.

MacLeod then moved to Europe in 1986 and signed for EV Landshut of the Eishockey-Bundesliga in Germany. After one season, he moved to EC Hedos München of the 2nd Bundesliga for two seasons before joining HC Merano of Italy's Italian Hockey League - Serie A. He then played two games with EHC Biel in the Swiss National League A during the 1990–91 season before retiring from hockey.

== Personal life ==
MacLeod's son, Wade, played professional ice hockey in the American Hockey League for the Springfield Falcons and Toronto Marlies.

== Awards and honours ==
Award	Year
IIHF World U20 Championship – Member of Team Canada	1979
Ken McKenzie Trophy - CHL Rookie of the Year	1983–84
Phil Esposito Trophy - CHL Leading Scorer	1983–84
Leo P. Lamoureux Memorial Trophy - IHL Leading Scorer	1984–85
Leo P. Lamoureux Memorial Trophy - IHL Leading Scorer	1985–86

Awards
Preceded by Wes Jarvis	Winner of the Phil Esposito Trophy; 1983–84	Succeeded by None
