= Chris Joseph (ice hockey) =

Canadian ice hockey player (born 1969)

- Born: September 10, 1969 (age 56) Burnaby, British Columbia, Canada
- Height: 6 ft 1 in (185 cm)
- Weight: 213 lb (97 kg; 15 st 3 lb)
- Position: Defence
- Shot: Right
- Played for: Pittsburgh Penguins; Edmonton Oilers; Tampa Bay Lightning; Philadelphia Flyers; Vancouver Canucks; Phoenix Coyotes; Atlanta Thrashers
- NHL draft: 5th overall, 1987; Pittsburgh Penguins
- Playing career: 1987–2006

Robin Christopher Joseph (born September 10, 1969) is a Canadian former professional ice hockey defenceman who played in the National Hockey League (NHL) for the Pittsburgh Penguins, Edmonton Oilers, Tampa Bay Lightning, Philadelphia Flyers, Vancouver Canucks, Phoenix Coyotes and Atlanta Thrashers.

== Playing career ==
Joseph was drafted 5th overall by the Penguins in the 1987 NHL entry draft. He made his NHL debut for the Penguins during the 1987–88 NHL season but was quickly traded to the Edmonton Oilers in the same season. The deal saw Joseph, Dave Hannan, Moe Mantha and Craig Simpson move to the Oilers with Paul Coffey, Dave Hunter and Wayne Van Dorp moving to Pittsburgh. After seven seasons with the Oilers he was traded to the Tampa Bay Lightning for Bob Beers.

He then began a second spell at Pittsburgh who claimed him in the NHL Waiver Draft, although after two seasons he was claimed in the 1996 NHL Waiver Draft by Vancouver.

He then signed with Philadelphia for two seasons before moving on to the Ottawa Senators. He would never play for the Senators though and was claimed two months later in the waiver draft for the third time in four years, once again by Vancouver. He was claimed off waivers for a third time in the season, this time by the Phoenix Coyotes. The next season, he was claimed off waivers one more time by Atlanta before leaving the NHL

In total, Joseph played 510 regular season games, scoring 39 goals with 112 assists for 151 points and collecting 567 penalty minutes. Joseph also played 31 playoff games, scoring 3 goals with 4 assists for 7 points, collecting 24 penalty minutes. In 2001, he moved to Europe to play in Finland's SM-liiga for TPS, before spending 3 seasons in the Deutsche Eishockey Liga in Germany for the Adler Mannheim. He then played in Italy for HC Milano Vipers in Serie A before retiring.

== Personal life ==
Since retiring Joseph became a City of Edmonton firefighter in early 2007.

His son, Jaxon, was killed in the Humboldt Broncos bus crash on April 6, 2018.

== Career statistics ==
=== Regular season and playoffs ===
			Regular season					Playoffs
Season	Team	League	GP	G	A	Pts	PIM	GP	G	A	Pts	PIM
1985–86	Seattle Thunderbirds	WHL	72	4	8	12	50	5	0	3	3	12
1986–87	Seattle Thunderbirds	WHL	67	13	45	58	155	—	—	—	—	—
1987–88	Pittsburgh Penguins	NHL	17	0	4	4	12	—	—	—	—	—
1987–88	Edmonton Oilers	NHL	7	0	4	4	6	—	—	—	—	—
1987–88	Seattle Thunderbirds	WHL	23	5	14	19	49	—	—	—	—	—
1987–88	Nova Scotia Oilers	AHL	8	0	2	2	8	4	0	0	0	9
1988–89	Edmonton Oilers	NHL	44	4	5	9	54	—	—	—	—	—
1988–89	Cape Breton Oilers	AHL	5	1	1	2	18	—	—	—	—	—
1989–90	Cape Breton Oilers	AHL	61	10	20	30	69	6	2	1	3	4
1989–90	Edmonton Oilers	NHL	4	0	2	2	2	—	—	—	—	—
1990–91	Edmonton Oilers	NHL	49	5	17	22	59	—	—	—	—	—
1991–92	Cape Breton Oilers	AHL	63	14	29	43	72	5	0	2	2	8
1991–92	Edmonton Oilers	NHL	7	0	0	0	8	5	1	3	4	2
1992–93	Edmonton Oilers	NHL	33	2	10	12	48	—	—	—	—	—
1993–94	Edmonton Oilers	NHL	10	1	1	2	28	—	—	—	—	—
1993–94	Tampa Bay Lightning	NHL	66	10	19	29	108	—	—	—	—	—
1994–95	Pittsburgh Penguins	NHL	33	5	10	15	46	10	1	1	2	12
1995–96	Pittsburgh Penguins	NHL	70	5	14	19	71	15	1	0	1	8
1996–97	Vancouver Canucks	NHL	63	3	13	16	62	—	—	—	—	—
1997–98	Philadelphia Flyers	NHL	15	1	0	1	19	1	0	0	0	2
1997–98	Philadelphia Phantoms	AHL	6	2	3	5	2	—	—	—	—	—
1998–99	Philadelphia Flyers	NHL	2	0	0	0	2	—	—	—	—	—
1998–99	Cincinnati Cyclones	IHL	27	11	19	30	38	—	—	—	—	—
1998–99	Philadelphia Phantoms	AHL	51	9	29	38	26	16	3	10	13	8
1999–2000	Vancouver Canucks	NHL	38	2	9	11	6	—	—	—	—	—
1999–2000	Phoenix Coyotes	NHL	9	0	0	0	0	—	—	—	—	—
2000–01	Phoenix Coyotes	NHL	24	1	1	2	16	—	—	—	—	—
2000–01	Atlanta Thrashers	NHL	19	0	3	3	20	—	—	—	—	—
2001–02	TPS	SM-l	32	6	9	15	105	8	1	1	2	31
2002–03	Adler Mannheim	DEL	47	7	23	30	124	8	0	6	6	2
2003–04	Adler Mannheim	DEL	47	5	13	18	67	6	0	2	2	16
2004–05	Adler Mannheim	DEL	50	1	12	13	52	10	0	0	0	2
2005–06	Milano Vipers	ITA	35	2	15	17	58	13	0	3	3	22
NHL totals			510	39	112	151	567	31	3	4	7	24
AHL totals			194	36	84	120	195	31	5	13	18	29
DEL totals			144	13	48	61	243	24	0	8	8	20

=== International ===
Year	Team	Event	GP	G	A	Pts	PIM
1987	Canada	WJC	6	1	1	2	12
1988	Canada	WJC	7	1	2	3	6
Junior totals			13	2	3	5	18

== Awards ==
- WHL West Second All-Star Team – 1987

Preceded by Zarley Zalapski	Pittsburgh Penguins first-round draft pick 1987	Succeeded by Darrin Shannon
