= Chris Pryor =

American ice hockey player (born 1961)

- Born: January 23, 1961 (age 65) Saint Paul, Minnesota, United States
- Height: 5 ft 11 in (180 cm)
- Weight: 210 lb (95 kg; 15 st 0 lb)
- Position: Defense
- Shot: Right
- Played for: Minnesota North Stars; New York Islanders
- NHL draft: Undrafted
- Playing career: 1983–1993

Christopher Michael Pryor (born January 23, 1961) is an American former professional ice hockey defenseman who played parts of six seasons in the National Hockey League (NHL) for the Minnesota North Stars and New York Islanders. He served as the assistant general manager of the Pittsburgh Penguins from 2021 to 2023.

After his playing career in 1993, Pryor was an assistant coach for one season with the minor league Salt Lake Golden Eagles, before he transitioned into a front office career as a scout. He was an amateur scout and player development director for the New York Islanders from 1994 to 1998.

From 1998 until his termination in 2019, he was a part of the Philadelphia Flyers organization, filling the roles of scout, scouting director, director of player personnel and eventually assistant general manager.

After two years with the Nashville Predators scouting department, he was hired by incoming Pittsburgh Penguins General Manager Ron Hextall in February 2021 to join the Penguins as director of player personnel. His role involved overseeing the organization's scouting operations in North America and Europe as well as assisting in team personnel decisions. His hiring was regarded as a "No.1 Priority" for Hextall, as the pair had previously worked together extensively in Philadelphia. Pryor was promoted on June 14, 2022, to assistant general manager, aiding Hextall in managing all aspects of the team. He and Hextall were both fired on April 14, 2023, after the Penguins missed the playoffs for the first time since 2006.

== Career statistics ==
			Regular season					Playoffs
Season	Team	League	GP	G	A	Pts	PIM	GP	G	A	Pts	PIM
1979–80	University of New Hampshire	ECAC	27	9	13	22	27	—	—	—	—	—
1980–81	University of New Hampshire	ECAC	33	10	27	37	36	—	—	—	—	—
1981–82	University of New Hampshire	ECAC	35	3	16	19	36	—	—	—	—	—
1982–83	University of New Hampshire	ECAC	34	4	9	13	23	—	—	—	—	—
1983–84	Salt Lake Golden Eagles	CHL	72	7	21	28	215	5	1	2	3	11
1984–85	Springfield Indians	AHL	77	3	21	24	158	4	0	2	2	0
1984–85	Minnesota North Stars	NHL	4	0	0	0	16	—	—	—	—	—
1985–86	Springfield Indians	AHL	55	4	16	20	104	—	—	—	—	—
1985–86	Minnesota North Stars	NHL	7	0	1	1	0	—	—	—	—	—
1986–87	Springfield Indians	AHL	5	0	2	2	17	—	—	—	—	—
1986–87	Minnesota North Stars	NHL	50	1	3	4	49	—	—	—	—	—
1987–88	Kalamazoo Wings	IHL	56	4	16	20	171	—	—	—	—	—
1987–88	Minnesota North Stars	NHL	3	0	0	0	6	—	—	—	—	—
1987–88	New York Islanders	NHL	1	0	0	0	2	—	—	—	—	—
1988–89	Springfield Indians	AHL	54	3	6	9	205	—	—	—	—	—
1988–89	New York Islanders	NHL	7	0	0	0	25	—	—	—	—	—
1989–90	Springfield Indians	AHL	60	3	7	10	105	18	1	3	4	12
1989–90	New York Islanders	NHL	10	0	0	0	24	—	—	—	—	—
1990–91	Capital District Islanders	AHL	41	1	8	9	94	—	—	—	—	—
1991–92	Capital District Islanders	AHL	22	0	3	3	12	7	2	2	4	18
1992–93	Capital District Islanders	AHL	3	0	0	0	6	—	—	—	—	—
NHL totals			82	1	4	5	122	—	—	—	—	—
