= Craig Levie =

Canadian ice hockey player

- Born: August 17, 1959 (age 66) Calgary, Alberta, Canada
- Height: 5 ft 11 in (180 cm)
- Weight: 190 lb (86 kg; 13 st 8 lb)
- Position: Defence
- Shot: Right
- Played for: Winnipeg Jets; Minnesota North Stars; St. Louis Blues; Vancouver Canucks
- NHL draft: 43rd overall, 1979; Montreal Canadiens
- Playing career: 1979–1992

Craig Dean Levie (born August 17, 1959) is a Canadian former professional ice hockey defenceman who played 183 games in the National Hockey League for the St. Louis Blues, Minnesota North Stars, Winnipeg Jets, and Vancouver Canucks.

== Career statistics ==
			Regular season					Playoffs
Season	Team	League	GP	G	A	Pts	PIM	GP	G	A	Pts	PIM
1976–77	Pincher Creek Panthers	AJHL	27	8	10	18	32	—	—	—	—	—
1976–77	Calgary Centennials	WCHL	2	0	1	1	0	—	—	—	—	—
1977–78	Flin Flon Bombers	WCHL	72	25	64	89	167	16	3	7	10	58
1978–79	Edmonton Oil Kings	WHL	69	29	63	92	200	7	4	6	10	11
1979–80	Nova Scotia Voyageurs	AHL	72	6	21	27	74	6	0	2	2	17
1980–81	Nova Scotia Voyageurs	AHL	80	20	62	82	162	6	5	2	7	16
1981–82	Tulsa Oilers	CHL	14	4	7	11	17	—	—	—	—	—
1981–82	Winnipeg Jets	NHL	40	4	9	13	48	—	—	—	—	—
1982–83	Winnipeg Jets	NHL	22	4	5	9	31	—	—	—	—	—
1982–83	Sherbrooke Jets	AHL	44	3	27	30	52	—	—	—	—	—
1983–84	Salt Lake Golden Eagles	CHL	37	8	20	28	101	—	—	—	—	—
1983–84	Minnesota North Stars	NHL	37	6	13	19	44	15	2	3	5	32
1984–85	St. Louis Blues	NHL	61	6	23	29	33	1	0	0	0	2
1984–85	Springfield Indians	AHL	36	5	23	28	82	—	—	—	—	—
1985–86	Minnesota North Stars	NHL	14	2	2	4	8	—	—	—	—	—
1986–87	HC Davos	NLA	6	7	4	11	8	—	—	—	—	—
1986–87	Vancouver Canucks	NHL	9	0	1	1	13	—	—	—	—	—
1987–88	HC Davos	NLA	22	5	12	17	31	—	—	—	—	—
1988–89	HC Milano Saima	Italy	35	17	30	47	10	5	4	2	6	12
1989–90	HC Devils Milano	Italy	40	21	32	53	22	—	—	—	—	—
1990–91	HC Devils Milano	Italy	36	12	29	41	27	9	2	7	9	30
1991–92	Fort Wayne Komets	IHL	1	0	0	0	0	—	—	—	—	—
NHL totals			183	22	53	75	177	16	2	3	5	34

== Awards ==
- WHL Second All-Star Team – 1979
