= 1982–83 CHL season =

- League: Central Hockey League
- Sport: Ice hockey

Regular season
- Regular Season Top Team: Indianapolis Checkers
- Top scorer: Wes Jarvis

Adams Cup playoffs

Adams Cup
- Champions: Indianapolis Checkers
- Runners-up: Birmingham South Stars

CHL seasons
- ← 1981–82 1983–84 →

The 1982–83 CHL season was the 20th season of the Central Hockey League, a North American minor professional league. Six teams participated in the regular season, and the Indianapolis Checkers won the league title.

== Regular season ==
Central Hockey League	GP	W	L	OTL	GF	GA	Pts
Indianapolis Checkers (NYI)	80	50	28	2	335	242	102
Colorado Flames (CGY)	80	41	36	3	322	322	85
Birmingham South Stars (MIN)	80	41	37	2	297	297	84
Salt Lake Golden Eagles (STL)	80	41	38	1	318	312	83
Tulsa Oilers (NYR)	80	32	47	1	282	321	65
Wichita Wind (NJ)	80	29	48	3	286	346	61

== Playoffs ==
Semifinals
1	Indianapolis Checkers	4
4	Salt Lake Golden Eagles	2
2	Colorado Flames	2
3	Birmingham South Stars	4

Final
1	Indianapolis Checkers	5
3	Birmingham South Stars	2
