= Birmingham South Stars =

- City: Birmingham, Alabama
- League: Central Hockey League
- Operated: 1982–1983
- Home arena: Birmingham Jefferson Convention Center
- Affiliates: Minnesota North Stars

The Birmingham South Stars were a professional ice hockey team in the Central Hockey League from 1982 to 1983. The South Stars were based out of Birmingham, Alabama at the Birmingham Jefferson Convention Center. Coached by Gene Ubriaco, the South Stars would lose in the Adams Cup Championship to the Indianapolis Checkers. Following the season, the team folded.

Notable players who played for the South Stars included Don Beaupre, Mario Lessard and Steve Carlson.

== Season-by-season record ==
Note: GP = Games played, W = Wins, L = Losses, T = Ties, Pts = Points, GF = Goals for, GA = Goals against, PIM = Penalties in minutes

Central Hockey League

Season	GP	W	L	T	Pts	GF	GA	PIM	Finish	Playoffs
1982-83	80	41	37	2	84	297	297	1797	3rd, CHL	Lost to Indianapolis in the finals
