= 1983–84 CHL season =

- League: Central Hockey League
- Sport: Ice hockey

Regular season
- Regular Season Top Team: Colorado Flames
- Top scorer: Scott MacLeod

Adams Cup playoffs

Adams Cup
- Champions: Tulsa Oilers
- Runners-up: Indianapolis Checkers

CHL seasons
- ← 1982–83

The 1983–84 CHL season was the 21st and last season of the Central Hockey League, a North American minor professional league. Five teams participated in the regular season, and the Tulsa Oilers won the league title. Games against the U.S. and Canadian Olympic Teams (not listed) counted in the regular season standings.

== Regular season ==
Central Hockey League	GP	W	L	OTL	GF	GA	Pts
Colorado Flames (CGY)	76	48	25	3	343	287	99
Tulsa Oilers (NYR)	68	36	27	5	252	248	77
Salt Lake Golden Eagles (MIN)	72	35	35	2	334	330	72
Indianapolis Checkers (NYI)	72	34	36	2	308	289	70
Montana Magic (STL)	76	20	52	4	276	381	44

== Playoffs ==
Semifinals
2	Tulsa Oilers	4
3	Salt Lake Golden Eagles	1
1	Colorado Flames	2
4	Indianapolis Checkers	4

Final
2	Tulsa Oilers	4
4	Indianapolis Checkers	0
