= Colorado Flames =

Ice hockey team in Denver, Colorado, United States

- City: Denver, Colorado
- League: Central Hockey League (1963–84)
- Operated: 1982 to 1984
- Home arena: McNichols Arena
- Colors: Red, black, gold, white
- Affiliates: Calgary Flames

The Colorado Flames were a minor-pro hockey team that played in the Central Hockey League (CHL) in Denver, Colorado for two seasons from 1982 to 1984. They were the top minor league affiliate of the NHL's Calgary Flames. They played their home games at McNichols Arena. When the league folded, the team did too. Goalie Mike Vernon and Al MacInnis played for the team during their time with the Calgary Flames.
