= 1987–88 NHL season =

National Hockey League season

- League: National Hockey League
- Sport: Ice hockey
- Duration: October 8, 1987 – May 26, 1988
- Games: 80
- Teams: 21
- TV partner(s): CBC, Canwest/Global, TSN, SRC (Canada); ESPN (United States)

Draft
- Top draft pick: Pierre Turgeon
- Picked by: Buffalo Sabres

Regular season
- Presidents' Trophy: Calgary Flames
- Season MVP: Mario Lemieux (Penguins)
- Top scorer: Mario Lemieux (Penguins)

Playoffs
- Playoffs MVP: Wayne Gretzky (Oilers)

Stanley Cup
- Champions: Edmonton Oilers
- Runners-up: Boston Bruins

NHL seasons
- 1986–87 1988–89

The 1987–88 NHL season was the 71st season of the National Hockey League. It was an 80-game season with the top four teams in each division advancing to the Stanley Cup playoffs. This season would see the Edmonton Oilers win their fourth Stanley Cup in five years by sweeping the Boston Bruins 4–0 in the Stanley Cup Final. In the process of their Cup win, Edmonton lost only two games, a record for the "16 wins" playoff format.

== Entry draft ==
The 1987 NHL entry draft was held on June 13, at Joe Louis Arena in Detroit, Michigan. This was the first draft held in the United States instead of in Canada. Pierre Turgeon was selected first overall by the Buffalo Sabres.

== Regular season ==
This was Wayne Gretzky's final season with the Edmonton Oilers and, as injuries held him out of 20% of the season, this would be the only season of the decade in which he was not the winner of the Hart Memorial Trophy and the first season of his career that he did not hold or share the league lead in points. Mario Lemieux would capture his first Hart Trophy and lead the league in scoring with 70 goals and 168 total points. His goals and points still rank first as of 2026 for the most by a player on a team that finished last place in their division.

On December 8, Ron Hextall of the Philadelphia Flyers became the first goalie to directly score a goal, shooting the puck into an empty net after their opponent had pulled their goalie for a sixth attacker.

On December 19, the St. Louis Blues and Boston Bruins combined to score two goals in two seconds. The Bruins were trailing 6-4 in the third period when Ken Linseman scored with 10 seconds remaining, followed by Blues center Doug Gilmour scoring off the resulting faceoff into an empty net.

The New Jersey Devils qualified for the playoffs for the first time, since their move from Denver in 1982.

Linesman John D'Amico retires after the season, becoming the last on-ice official from the Original Six era.

=== Final standings ===
Note: GP = Games played, W = Wins, L = Losses, T = Ties, Pts = Points, GF = Goals for, GA = Goals against
Note: Teams that qualified for the playoffs are highlighted in bold.

==== Prince of Wales Conference ====
Adams Division
	GP	W	L	T	GF	GA	Pts
**Montreal Canadiens**	80	45	22	13	298	238	103
**Boston Bruins**	80	44	30	6	300	251	94
**Buffalo Sabres**	80	37	32	11	283	305	85
**Hartford Whalers**	80	35	38	7	249	267	77
Quebec Nordiques	80	32	43	5	271	306	69

Patrick Division
	GP	W	L	T	GF	GA	Pts
**New York Islanders**	80	39	31	10	308	267	88
**Washington Capitals**	80	38	33	9	281	249	85
**Philadelphia Flyers**	80	38	33	9	292	292	85
**New Jersey Devils**	80	38	36	6	295	296	82
New York Rangers	80	36	34	10	300	283	82
Pittsburgh Penguins	80	36	35	9	319	316	81

==== Clarence Campbell Conference ====
Norris Division
	GP	W	L	T	GF	GA	Pts
**Detroit Red Wings**	80	41	28	11	322	269	93
**St. Louis Blues**	80	34	38	8	278	294	76
**Chicago Blackhawks**	80	30	41	9	284	328	69
**Toronto Maple Leafs**	80	21	49	10	273	345	52
Minnesota North Stars	80	19	48	13	242	349	51

Smythe Division
	GP	W	L	T	GF	GA	Pts
**Calgary Flames**	80	48	23	9	397	305	105
**Edmonton Oilers**	80	44	25	11	363	288	99
**Winnipeg Jets**	80	33	36	11	292	310	77
**Los Angeles Kings**	80	30	42	8	318	359	68
Vancouver Canucks	80	25	46	9	272	320	59

== Playoffs ==
=== Bracket ===
The top four teams in each division qualified for the playoffs. In each round, teams competed in a best-of-seven series (scores in the bracket indicate the number of games won in each best-of-seven series). In the division semifinals, the fourth seeded team in each division played against the division winner from their division. The other series matched the second and third place teams from the divisions. The two winning teams from each division's semifinals then met in the division finals. The two division winners of each conference then played in the conference finals. The two conference winners then advanced to the Stanley Cup Final.

Division semifinals	Division finals
A1	Montreal	4
A4	Hartford	2
A1	Montreal	1
A2	Boston	4
A2	Boston	4
A3	Buffalo	2
Prince of Wales Conference
P1	NY Islanders	2
P4	New Jersey	4
P4	New Jersey	4
P2	Washington	3
P2	Washington	4
P3	Philadelphia	3
N1	Detroit	4
N4	Toronto	2
N1	Detroit	4
N2	St. Louis	1
N2	St. Louis	4
N3	Chicago	1
Clarence Campbell Conference
S1	Calgary	4
S4	Los Angeles	1
S1	Calgary	0
S2	Edmonton	4
S2	Edmonton	4
S3	Winnipeg	1

Conference finals
A2	Boston	4
P4	New Jersey	3
N1	Detroit	1
S2	Edmonton	4

Stanley Cup Finals
A2	Boston	0
S2	Edmonton	4

== Awards ==
The NHL introduced a new trophy, the King Clancy Memorial Trophy, which was to be awarded to the player who best exemplifies leadership qualities on and off the ice and who has made a significant humanitarian contribution in his community.

1987–88 NHL awards
Award	Recipient(s)	Runner(s)-up/Finalists
Presidents' Trophy (Best regular season record)	Calgary Flames	Montreal Canadiens
Prince of Wales Trophy (Wales Conference playoff champion)	Boston Bruins	New Jersey Devils
Clarence S. Campbell Bowl (Campbell Conference playoff champion)	Edmonton Oilers	Detroit Red Wings
Art Ross Trophy (Player with most points)	Mario Lemieux (Pittsburgh Penguins)	Wayne Gretzky (Edmonton Oilers)
Bill Masterton Memorial Trophy (Perseverance, Sportsmanship, and Dedication)	Bob Bourne (Los Angeles Kings)	N/A
Calder Memorial Trophy (Best first-year player)	Joe Nieuwendyk (Calgary Flames)	Darren Pang (Chicago Blackhawks); Ray Sheppard (Buffalo Sabres)
Conn Smythe Trophy (Most valuable player, playoffs)	Wayne Gretzky (Edmonton Oilers)	N/A
Emery Edge Award (Best plus-minus statistic)	Brad McCrimmon (Calgary Flames)	Petr Svoboda (Montreal Canadiens)
Frank J. Selke Trophy (Best defensive forward)	Guy Carbonneau (Montreal Canadiens)	Jan Erixon (New York Rangers); Steve Kasper (Boston Bruins)
Hart Memorial Trophy (Most valuable player, regular season)	Mario Lemieux (Pittsburgh Penguins)	Grant Fuhr (Edmonton Oilers); Wayne Gretzky (Edmonton Oilers)
Jack Adams Award (Best coach)	Jacques Demers (Detroit Red Wings)	Terry Crisp (Calgary Flames); Jean Perron (Montreal Canadiens)
James Norris Memorial Trophy (Best defenceman)	Ray Bourque (Boston Bruins)	Scott Stevens (Washington Capitals); Gary Suter (Calgary Flames)
King Clancy Memorial Trophy (Leadership and humanitarian contribution)	Lanny McDonald (Calgary Flames)	Wayne Gretzky (Edmonton Oilers); Bryan Trottier (New York Islanders)
Lady Byng Memorial Trophy (Sportsmanship and excellence)	Mats Naslund (Montreal Canadiens)	Wayne Gretzky (Edmonton Oilers); Joe Nieuwendyk (Calgary Flames)
Lester B. Pearson Award (Outstanding player)	Mario Lemieux (Pittsburgh Penguins)	N/A
Vezina Trophy (Best goaltender)	Grant Fuhr (Edmonton Oilers)	Tom Barrasso (Buffalo Sabres); Kelly Hrudey (New York Islanders)
William M. Jennings Trophy (Goaltender(s) of team with fewest goals against)	Patrick Roy and Brian Hayward (Montreal Canadiens)	Clint Malarchuk and Pete Peeters (Washington Capitals)

=== All-Star teams ===
First Team	Position	Second Team
Grant Fuhr, Edmonton Oilers	G	Patrick Roy, Montreal Canadiens
Ray Bourque, Boston Bruins	D	Gary Suter, Calgary Flames
Scott Stevens, Washington Capitals	D	Brad McCrimmon, Calgary Flames
Mario Lemieux, Pittsburgh Penguins	C	Wayne Gretzky, Edmonton Oilers
Hakan Loob, Calgary Flames	RW	Cam Neely, Boston Bruins
Luc Robitaille, Los Angeles Kings	LW	Michel Goulet, Quebec Nordiques

== Player statistics ==
=== Scoring leaders ===
Note: GP = Games played; G = Goals; A = Assists; Pts = Points, PIM = Penalties in minutes, PPG = Powerplay Goals, SHG = Shorthanded Goals, GWG = Game Winning Goals

Player	Team	GP	G	A	Pts	PIM	+/-	PPG	SHG	GWG
Mario Lemieux	Pittsburgh Penguins	77	70	98	168	92	+23	22	10	7
Wayne Gretzky	Edmonton Oilers	64	40	109	149	24	+39	9	5	3
Denis Savard	Chicago Blackhawks	80	44	87	131	95	+4	14	7	6
Dale Hawerchuk	Winnipeg Jets	80	44	77	121	59	-9	20	3	4
Luc Robitaille	Los Angeles Kings	80	53	58	111	82	-9	17	0	6
Peter Stastny	Quebec Nordiques	76	46	65	111	69	+2	20	0	2
Mark Messier	Edmonton Oilers	77	37	74	111	103	+21	12	3	7
Jimmy Carson	Los Angeles Kings	80	55	52	107	45	-19	22	0	7
Hakan Loob	Calgary Flames	80	50	56	106	47	+41	9	8	4
Michel Goulet	Quebec Nordiques	80	48	58	106	56	-31	29	1	4

Source: NHL.

=== Leading goaltenders ===
GP = Games played; Min = Minutes played; W = Wins; L = Losses; T = Ties; SO = Shutouts; GAA = Goals against average; Sv% = Save percentage

Goalie	Team	GP	Min	W	L	T	SO	GAA	Sv%
Pete Peeters	Washington Capitals	35	1894	14	12	5	2	2.79	.898
Brian Hayward	Montreal Canadiens	39	2245	22	10	4	2	2.86	.896
Patrick Roy	Montreal Canadiens	45	3561	23	12	9	3	2.90	.900
Rejean Lemelin	Boston Bruins	49	2821	24	17	5	3	2.93	.889
Greg Stefan	Detroit Red Wings	33	1851	17	9	5	1	3.11	.896
Clint Malarchuk	Washington Capitals	54	2926	24	20	4	4	3.16	.885
Mike Liut	Hartford Whalers	60	3532	25	28	5	2	3.18	.884
Billy Smith	New York Islanders	38	2105	17	14	5	2	3.22	.893
Glen Hanlon	Detroit Red Wings	47	2617	22	17	5	4	3.23	.891
Tom Barrasso	Buffalo Sabres	54	3133	25	18	8	2	3.31	.896

Source: Quanthockey.com

== Coaches ==
=== Patrick Division ===
- New Jersey Devils: Doug Carpenter and Jim Schoenfeld
- New York Islanders: Terry Simpson
- New York Rangers: Michel Bergeron
- Philadelphia Flyers: Mike Keenan and Paul Holmgren
- Pittsburgh Penguins: Pierre Creamer
- Washington Capitals: Bryan Murray

=== Adams Division ===
- Boston Bruins: Terry O'Reilly
- Buffalo Sabres: Ted Sator
- Hartford Whalers: Jack Evans
- Montreal Canadiens: Jean Perron
- Quebec Nordiques: Andre Savard and Ron Lapointe

=== Norris Division ===
- Chicago Blackhawks: Bob Murdoch
- Detroit Red Wings: Jacques Demers
- Minnesota North Stars: Herb Brooks
- St. Louis Blues: Jacques Martin
- Toronto Maple Leafs: John Brophy

=== Smythe Division ===
- Calgary Flames: Terry Crisp
- Edmonton Oilers: Glen Sather
- Los Angeles Kings: Robbie Ftorek
- Vancouver Canucks: Bob McCammon
- Winnipeg Jets: Dan Maloney

== Milestones ==
=== Debuts ===
The following is a list of players of note who played their first NHL game in 1987–88:

- Tommy Albelin, Quebec Nordiques
- Rob Brown, Pittsburgh Penguins
- Sean Burke, New Jersey Devils
- Adam Graves, Detroit Red Wings
- Jiri Hrdina, Calgary Flames
- Craig Janney, Boston Bruins
- Calle Johansson, Buffalo Sabres
- Brian Leetch, New York Rangers
- Jeff Norton, New York Islanders
- Luke Richardson, Toronto Maple Leafs
- Mathieu Schneider, Montreal Canadiens
- Brendan Shanahan, New Jersey Devils
- Ray Sheppard, Buffalo Sabres
- Kevin Stevens, Pittsburgh Penguins
- Ron Tugnutt, Quebec Nordiques
- Pierre Turgeon, Buffalo Sabres
- Glen Wesley, Boston Bruins
- Trent Yawney, Chicago Blackhawks
- Scott Young, Hartford Whalers
- Zarley Zalapski, Pittsburgh Penguins

=== Last games ===
The following is a list of players of note that played their last game in the NHL in 1987–88:

- Bob Bourne, Los Angeles Kings
- Richard Brodeur, Hartford Whalers
- Clark Gillies, Buffalo Sabres
- Doug Jarvis, Hartford Whalers
- Pierre Larouche, New York Rangers
- Dave Lewis, Detroit Red Wings
- Gilles Meloche, Pittsburgh Penguins
- Rick Middleton, Boston Bruins
- Wilf Paiement, Pittsburgh Penguins (The last active player to have been a member of the Kansas City Scouts.)
- Steve Payne, Minnesota North Stars
- Denis Potvin, New York Islanders
- Dave Semenko, Toronto Maple Leafs
- Charlie Simmer, Pittsburgh Penguins
- Brian Sutter, St. Louis Blues
- Perry Turnbull, St. Louis Blues
- Tiger Williams, Hartford Whalers

=== Firsts ===
- Ron Hextall, Philadelphia Flyers, First goaltender in NHL history to shoot and score a goal.

== Broadcasting ==
In Canada, the cable network TSN began airing a schedule of Monday and Thursday night regular season games. The Molson-sponsored Hockey Night in Canada on CBC continued to air Saturday night regular season games. This was the last season of the Carling O'Keefe-sponsored telecasts on Canwest/Global, with Global airing selected regular season games between January and March. Coverage of the Stanley Cup playoffs were split between CBC and Global, with the later branding its postseason broadcasts as Stanley Cup '88. Carling O'Keefe's rights expired at the end of the season, and 1989 merger between Molson and Carling O'Keefe eventually put an end to the competition.

This was the third and final season of the league's U.S. national broadcast rights deal with ESPN, airing up to 33 regular season games each season as well as the All-Star Game and the playoffs. SportsChannel America then signed a three-year contract to take over the rights from ESPN.

== See also ==
- List of Stanley Cup champions
- 1987 NHL entry draft
- 1987 NHL supplemental draft
- 1987–88 NHL transactions
- 39th National Hockey League All-Star Game
- National Hockey League All-Star Game
- NHL All-Rookie Team
- Ice hockey at the 1988 Winter Olympics
- 1987 Canada Cup
- 1987 in sports
- 1988 in sports
