= List of St. Louis Blues records =

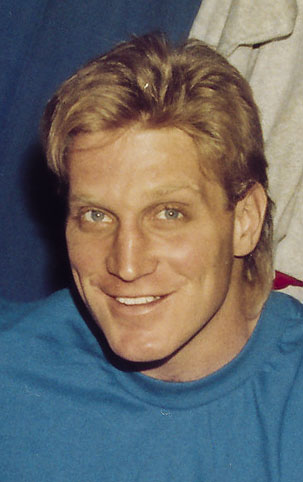
Brett Hull is the Blues' all-time leader in career regular season goals; single season goals and points; and career playoff games played, goals, and points.

This is a list of franchise records for the St. Louis Blues of the National Hockey League (updated through January 26, 2026).

== Career regular season leaders ==
=== Skaters ===
Games played
#	Player	GP	Seasons
1	Bernie Federko	927	1976–1989
2	Barret Jackman	803	2001–2015
3	Brian Sutter	779	1976–1988
4	Colton Parayko	775	2015-present
5	Alex Steen	765	2008–2020
Active leader
4	Colton Parayko	775	2015–present

Goals
#	Player	G	Seasons
1	Brett Hull	527	1987–1998
2	Bernie Federko	352	1976–1989
3	Brian Sutter	303	1976–1988
4	Garry Unger	292	1970–1979
5	Vladimir Tarasenko	262	2012–2023
Active leader
11	Brayden Schenn	179	2017–present

Assists
#	Player	A	Seasons
1	Bernie Federko	721	1976–1989
2	Brett Hull	409	1987–1998
3	Alex Pietrangelo	341	2008–2020
4	Brian Sutter	333	1976–1988
5	Al MacInnis	325	1994–2004
Active leader
6	Robert Thomas	311	2017–present

Points
#	Player	Pts	Seasons
1	Bernie Federko	1,073	1976–1989
2	Brett Hull	936	1987–1998
3	Brian Sutter	636	1976–1988
4	Garry Unger	575	1970–1979
5	Vladimir Tarasenko	524	2012–2023
Active leader
10	Brayden Schenn	457	2017–present

Power play goals
#	Player	PPG	Seasons
1	Brett Hull	195	1987–1998
2	Bernie Federko	117	1976–1989
3	Brian Sutter	107	1976–1988
4	Keith Tkachuk	96	2001–2007, 2007–2010
5	Garry Unger	86	1970–1979
Active leader
14	Brayden Schenn	50	2017–present

Short-handed goals
#	Player	SHG	Seasons
1	Larry Patey	23	1975–1984
2	Brett Hull	18	1987–1998
3	Rick Meagher	13	1985–1991
4	Chuck Lefley	10	1974–1977, 1979–1981
4	Scott Pellerin	10	1997–2000, 2003
Active leader
15	Robert Thomas	7	2017–present

Game winning goals
#	Player	GWG	Seasons
1	Brett Hull	70	1987–1998
2	Pavol Demitra	45	1997–2004
3	Vladimir Tarasenko	44	2012–2023
4	Garry Unger	40	1970–1979
4	Bernie Federko	40	1976–1989
Active leader
6	Brayden Schenn	35	2017–present

Highest Plus-Minus
#	Player	+/-	Seasons
1	Chris Pronger	140	1995–2004
2	Al MacInnis	132	1995–2005
3	Pavol Demitra	99	1997–2004
3	Paul Cavallini	99	1987–1992
5	Alex Pietrangelo	77	2008–2020
Active leader
12	Colton Parayko	57	2015–present

Penalties in minutes
#	Player	PIM	Seasons
1	Brian Sutter	1,786	1976–1988
2	Kelly Chase	1,497	1989–2000
3	Barclay Plager	1,115	1967–1977
4	Barret Jackman	1,026	2001–2015
5	David Backes	969	2005–2016
Active leader
39	Brayden Schenn	420	2017–present

Points per game
#	Player	P/G	Seasons
1	Adam Oates	1.47	1989–1992
2	Brett Hull	1.26	1987–1998
3	Craig Janney	1.26	1992–1995
4	Bernie Federko	1.16	1976–1989
5	Joe Mullen	1.11	1979–1986
Active leader
20	Pavel Buchnevich	0.846	2021–present

=== Goaltenders ===
Games played
#	Player	GP	Seasons
1	Jordan Binnington	365	2016–present
2	Mike Liut	347	1979–1985
3	Jake Allen	289	2013–2020
4	Curtis Joseph	280	1989–1995
5	Grant Fuhr	249	1995–1999
Active leader
1	Jordan Binnington	365	2016–present

Wins
#	Player	W	Seasons
1	Jordan Binnington	181	2016–present
2	Mike Liut	151	1979–1985
3	Jake Allen	148	2013–2020
4	Curtis Joseph	137	1989–1995
5	Grant Fuhr	108	1995–1999
Active leader
1	Jordan Binnington	181	2016–present

Losses
#	Player	L	Seasons
1	Mike Liut	133	1979–1985
2	Jordan Binnington	130	2016–present
3	Curtis Joseph	96	1989–1995
4	Jake Allen	94	2013–2020
5	Greg Millen	87	1984–1990
5	Grant Fuhr	87	1995–1999
Active leader
2	Jordan Binnington	130	2016–present

Goals against average
#	Player	GAA	Seasons
1	Brian Elliott	2.01	2011–2016
2	Jacques Plante	2.07	1968–1970
3	Roman Turek	2.10	1999–2001
4	Jamie McLennan	2.21	1997–2000
5	Jaroslav Halak	2.23	2010–2014
5	Carter Hutton	2.23	2016-2018
Active leader
16	Joel Hofer	2.73	2021–present

Save percentage
#	Player	SV%	Seasons
1	Jacques Plante	.931	1968–1970
2	Brian Elliott	.925	2011–2016
3	Carter Hutton	.923	2016–2018
4	Glenn Hall	.917	1967–1971
5	Jaroslav Halak	.916	2010–2014
Active leader
14	Joel Hofer	.906	2021–present

Shutouts
#	Player	SO	Seasons
1	Brian Elliott	25	2011–2016
2	Jake Allen	21	2013–2020
3	Jaroslav Halak	20	2010–2014
4	Jordan Binnington	19	2016–present
5	Glenn Hall	16	1967-1971
Active leader
4	Jordan Binnington	19	2016–present

== Single season records ==
=== Skaters ===
Goals
#	Player	G	Season
1	Brett Hull	86	1990–91
2	Brett Hull	72	1989–90
3	Brett Hull	70	1991–92
4	Brett Hull	57	1993–94
5	Wayne Babych	54	1980–81

Assists
#	Player	A	Season
1	Adam Oates	90	1990–91
2	Craig Janney	82	1992–93
3	Adam Oates	79	1989–90
4	Bernie Federko	73	1980–81
4	Bernie Federko	73	1984–85

Points
#	Player	Pts	Season
1	Brett Hull	131	1990–91
2	Adam Oates	115	1990–91
3	Brett Hull	113	1989–90
4	Brett Hull	109	1991–92
5	Bernie Federko	107	1983–84

Points (Defenseman)
#	Player	Pts	Season
1	Jeff Brown	78	1992–93
2	Al MacInnis	68	2002–03
3	Rob Ramage	66	1985–86
4	Al MacInnis	62	1998–99
4	Chris Pronger	62	1999–2000

Points (Rookie)
#	Player	Pts	Season
1	Jorgen Pettersson	73	1980–81
2	Wayne Babych	63	1978–79
3	Rod Brind'Amour	61	1989–90
4	Joe Mullen	59	1981–82
4	Nelson Emerson	59	1991–1992

Plus-Minus
#	Player	+/-	Season
1	Chris Pronger	52	1999–2000
2	Chris Pronger	47	1997–98
3	Justin Faulk	41	2021–22
4	Paul Cavallini	38	1989–90
5	Rick Lapointe	36	1980–81

Penalties in minutes
#	Player	PIM	Season
1	Bob Gassoff	306	1975–76
2	Kelly Chase	278	1993–94
3	Kelly Chase	264	1991–92
4	Bob Gassoff	254	1976–77
4	Brian Sutter	254	1982–83

=== Goaltenders ===
Wins
#	Player	W	Season
1	Roman Turek	42	1999–2000
2	Curtis Joseph	36	1993–94
3	Brent Johnson	34	2001–02
4	Mike Liut	33	1980–81
4	Grant Fuhr	33	1996–97
4	Jake Allen	33	2016–17

Shutouts
#	Player	SO	Seasons
1	Brian Elliott	9	2011–12
2	Glenn Hall	8	1968–69
3	Roman Turek	7	1999–2000
3	Jaroslav Halak	7	2010–11
5	Greg Millen	6	1988–89
5	Roman Turek	6	2000–01
5	Chris Mason	6	2008–09
5	Jaroslav Halak	6	2011–12
5	Jake Allen	6	2015–16

Losses
#	Player	L	Season
1	Mike Liut	29	1983–84
2	Mike Liut	28	1981–82
2	Curtis Joseph	28	1992–93
2	Grant Fuhr	28	1995–96
5	Mike Liut	27	1982–83
5	Grant Fuhr	27	1996–97

== Career playoff leaders ==
=== Skaters ===
Games played
#	Player	GP	Seasons
1	Brett Hull	102	1987–1998
2	Alex Pietrangelo	92	2008–2020
3	Bernie Federko	91	1976–1989
3	Alexander Steen	91	2008–2020
4	Vladimir Tarasenko	90	2012-2023
Active leader
9	Colton Parayko	82	2015–present

Goals
#	Player	G	Seasons
1	Brett Hull	67	1987–1998
2	Vladimir Tarasenko	40	2012–2023
3	Bernie Federko	35	1976–1989
4	Jaden Schwartz	26	2012–2021
5	Red Berenson	21	1967–1977
5	Brian Sutter	21	1976–1988
Active leader
28	Colton Parayko	10	2015–present

Assists
#	Player	A	Seasons
1	Bernie Federko	66	1976–1989
2	Brett Hull	50	1987–1998
3	Al MacInnis	44	1994–2003
4	Alex Pietrangelo	43	2008–present
5	Chris Pronger	41	1995–2004
Active leader
17	Colton Parayko	22	2015–present

Points
#	Player	Pts	Seasons
1	Brett Hull	117	1987–1998
2	Bernie Federko	101	1976–1989
3	Al MacInnis	58	1994–2003
3	Vladimir Tarasenko	58	2012–2023
4	Doug Gilmour	55	1983–1988
Active leader
21	Colton Parayko	32	2015–present

Penalties in minutes
#	Player	PIM	Seasons
1	Brian Sutter	249	1976–1988
2	Chris Pronger	210	1995–2004
3	Bob Plager	195	1967–1977
4	Barclay Plager	182	1967–1976
5	Noel Picard	167	1967–1971
Active leader
56	Brayden Schenn	43	2017–present

=== Goaltenders ===
Games played
#	Player	GP	Seasons
1	Jordan Binnington	41	2018–present
2	Mike Liut	39	1979–1984
3	Greg Millen	35	1984–1989
4	Curtis Joseph	34	1989–1995
5	Brian Elliott	33	2011–2016
Active leader
1	Jordan Binnington	41	2018–present

Losses
#	Player	L	Seasons
1	Mike Liut	20	1979–1984
1	Jordan Binnington	20	2018–present
3	Glenn Hall	18	1967–1971
4	Greg Millen	17	1984–1989
4	Brian Elliott	17	2011–2016
Active leader
1	Jordan Binnington	20	2018–present

Wins
#	Player	W	Seasons
1	Jordan Binnington	20	2018–present
2	Mike Liut	17	1979–1984
2	Greg Millen	17	1984–1989
4	Curtis Joseph	16	1989–1995
5	Grant Fuhr	15	1995–1999
Active leader
3	Jordan Binnington	20	2018–present

Shutouts
#	Player	W	Seasons
1	Jacques Plante	4	1968–1970
2	Grant Fuhr	3	1995–1999
2	Brent Johnson	3	1998–2004
4	Curtis Joseph	2	1989–1995
5	Glenn Hall	1	1967–1971
5	Ernie Wakely	1	1969–1972
5	Mike Liut	1	1979–1984
5	Vincent Riendeau	1	1988–1991
5	Jon Casey	1	1995–1997
5	Chris Osgood	1	2003–2004
5	Brian Elliott	1	2011–2016
5	Jordan Binnington	1	2018–present
5	Ville Husso	1	2021–2022
Active leader
5	Jordan Binnington	1	2018–present

== See also ==
- List of St. Louis Blues players
- List of St. Louis Blues seasons
