= List of St. Louis Blues players =

This is a list of players who have played at least one game for the St. Louis Blues of the National Hockey League (NHL) from 1967–68 to present.

== Key ==
- * Appeared in a Blues game during the 2025–2026 season.
- † Hockey Hall of Famer, Stanley Cup, or retired number.

**Abbreviations**
Nat	Nationality
GP	Games Played

Goaltenders
W	Wins	SO	Shutouts
L	Losses	GAA	Goals against average
T	Ties	SV%	Save percentage
OTL	Overtime loss		

Skaters
Pos	Position	RW	Right wing	A	Assists
D	Defenseman	C	Centre	P	Points
LW	Left wing	G	Goals	PIM	Penalty minutes

Bold denotes players who have played at least one game for the Blues and continue to belong/play for the Blues organization (including minor league affiliates). Note: Stats are updated through to the end of the 2025-2026 season

== Goaltenders ==
Name	Nationality	Seasons	GP	W	L	T	OTL	SO	GAA	SV%	GP	W	L	SO	GAA	SV%	Notes
Name	Nationality	Seasons	Regular season								Playoffs						Notes
Jake Allen	Canada	2011–2020	289	148	94	–	26	21	2.50	.913	29	11	12	0	2.06	.924	SC 2019
Jason Bacashihua	United States	2005–2007	38	7	17	–	4	0	3.19	.897	–	–	–	–	–	–	
Tom Barrasso	United States	2002–2003	6	1	4	0	–	1	3.28	.879	–	–	–	–	–	–	
Chris Beckford-Tseu	Canada	2007–2008	1	0	0	–	0	0	2.22	.889	–	–	–	–	–	–	
Yves Belanger	Canada	1974–1978	48	19	23	3	–	1	3.66	–	–	–	–	–	–	–	
**Jordan Binnington***	Canada	2015–2026	377	186	136	–	43	19	2.83	.903	48	23	24	1	2.70	.909	SC 2019
Ben Bishop	United States	2008–2011	13	4	5	–	1	1	2.83	.896	–	–	–	–	–	–	
Fred Brathwaite	Canada	2001–2003	55	21	20	8	–	4	2.51	.891	1	0	0	0	0.00	0	
Martin Brodeur	Canada	2014–2015	7	3	3	–	0	1	2.87	.899	–	–	–	–	–	–	
Don Caley	Canada	1967–1968	1	0	0	0	–	0	6.00	–	–	–	–	–	–	–	
Jim Carey	United States	1998–1999	4	1	2	0	–	0	3.86	.829	–	–	–	–	–	–	
Jacques Caron	Canada	1971–1973	58	22	22	10	–	2	3.02	–	12	4	7	0	3.19	–	
Jon Casey	United States	1994–1997	43	12	16	4	–	0	3.19	.881	14	6	7	1	3.45	.853	
Ty Conklin	United States	2009–2011	41	18	18	–	6	6	2.83	.904	–	–	–	–	–	–	
Pheonix Copley	United States	2015–2017	2	0	1	–	0	0	4.34	.829	–	–	–	–	–	–	
John Davidson	Canada	1973–1975	79	30	34	14	–	0	3.58	–	1	0	1	0	4.00	–	
Reinhard Divis	Austria	2001–2006	28	6	9	2	1	0	3.32	.880	1	0	0	0	0.00	1.000	
Brian Elliott	Canada	2011–2016	180	104	46	—	16	25	2.01	.925	33	14	17	1	2.32	.907	
Gary Edwards	Canada	1973–1975	12	1	6	1	–	0	5.40	–	—	—	—	—	—	–	
Grant Fuhr†	Canada	1995–1999	249	108	87	41	—	11	2.68	.900	31	15	14	3	2.03	.928	2003 HHOF
Jon Gillies	United States	2021–2022	1	0	1	–	0	0	2.82	.923	–	–	–	–	–	–	
Doug Grant	Canada	1976–1980	31	10	12	6	—	1	3.50	–	–	–	–	–	–	–	
Gilles Gratton	Canada	1975–1976	6	2	0	2	—	0	2.49	–	–	–	–	–	–	–	
Thomas Greiss	Germany	2022–2023	21	7	11	–	0	1	3.58	.896	–	–	–	–	–	–	
Jaroslav Halak	Slovakia	2010–2014	159	83	47	—	19	20	2.23	.916	2	1	1	0	1.73	.935	
Glenn Hall†	Canada	1967–1971	140	58	52	28	—	16	2.43	–	31	12	18	1	2.68	–	1967–68 Conn Smythe Trophy; 1968–69 Vezina Trophy; 1975 HHoF
Glen Hanlon	Canada	1981–1983	16	3	9	1	—	0	4.66	–	3	0	2	0	4.95	–	
Guy Hebert	United States	1991–1993	37	13	13	3	—	1	3.39	.892	1	0	0	0	0.00	1.000	
Rick Heinz	Canada	1982–1985	46	12	18	5	—	1	4.14	.853	1	0	0	0	7.50	.500	2.62||.905||–||–||–||–||–||–||
**Joel Hofer***	Canada	2021–2026	115	59	35	–	10	8	2.67	.908	–	–	–	–	–	–	
Chris Holt	Canada	2008–2009	1	0	0	—	0	0	0.00	1.000	–	–	–	–	–	–	
Jim Hrivnak	Canada	1993–1994	23	4	10	0	–	0	4.27	.877	–	–	–	–	–	–	
Ville Husso	Finland	2020–2022	57	34	13	–	7	3	2.74	.912	7	2	5	1	3.67	.890	
Carter Hutton	Canada	2016–2018	62	30	15	–	5	7	2.23	.923	–	–	–	–	–	–	
Robbie Irons	Canada	1968–1969	1	0	0	0	–	0	0.00	–	–	–	–	–	–	–	
Pat Jablonski	United States	1989–1992	23	5	12	3	–	0	4.13	.863	3	0	0	0	3.33	.857	
Bob Johnson	United States	1972–1973	12	6	5	0	–	0	2.68	–	–	–	–	–	–	–	
Brent Johnson	United States	1998–2004	143	76	47	12	–	12	2.26	.903	12	5	6	3	1.89	.937	
Chad Johnson	Canada	2018–2019	10	2	6	–	0	1	3.55	.884	–	–	–	–	–	–	
Eddie Johnston	Canada	1974–1978	118	41	52	20	–	4	3.36	–	4	0	3	0	4.46	–	
Curtis Joseph	Canada	1989–1995	280	137	96	34	—	5	3.04	.907	1	0	0	0	7.50	.500	
Patrick Lalime	Canada	2005–2006	31	4	18	–	8	0	3.64	.881	–	–	–	–	–	–	
Michel Larocque	Canada	1983–1984	5	0	5	0	–	0	6.20	.811	–	–	–	–	–	–	
Manny Legace	Canada	2006–2009	140	63	49	–	15	10	2.62	.905	–	–	–	–	–	–	
Charlie Lindgren	United States	2021–2022	5	5	0	–	0	0	1.22	.958	–	–	–	–	–	–	
Mike Liut	Canada	1979–1985	347	151	133	52	–	10	3.58	.882	39	17	20	1	2.44	.920	
Seth Martin	Canada	1967–1968	30	8	10	7	–	1	2.59	–	2	0	0	0	4.11	–	
Chris Mason	Canada	2008–2010	118	57	43	–	15	8	2.47	.915	4	0	4	0	2.34	.916	
Darrell May	Canada	1985–1987	6	1	5	0	–	0	5.11	.839	–	–	–	–	–	–	
Peter McDuffe	Canada	1971–1972	10	0	6	0	–	0	3.73	–	1	0	1	0	7.00	–	
Jamie McLennan	Canada	1997–2000	82	38	27	8	–	7	2.21	.898	2	0	1	0	2.15	.875	
Jimmy McLeod	Canada	1971–1972	16	6	6	4	–	0	3.00	–	–	–	–	–	–	–	
Greg Millen	Canada	1984–1990	209	85	87	33	–	9	3.43	.881	35	17	17	0	2.86	.902	
Ryan Miller	United States	2013–2014	19	10	8	–	1	1	2.47	.903	6	2	4	0	2.70	.897	
Phil Myre	Canada	1977–1979	83	20	47	16	–	2	3.96	–	–	–	–	–	–	–	
Anders Nilsson	Sweden	2015–2016	3	0	1	–	0	0	2.76	.909	–	–	–	–	–	–	
Chris Osgood	Canada	2002–2004	76	35	28	10	–	5	2.34	.907	12	4	8	1	2.48	.899	
Ted Ouimet	Canada	1968–1969	1	0	1	0	–	0	2.00	–	–	–	–	–	–	–	
Rich Parent	Canada	1997–1999	11	4	3	1	–	1	2.49	.887	–	–	–	–	–	–	
Jacques Plante†	Canada	1968–1970	69	36	21	11	–	10	2.07	–	16	12	3	4	1.46	–	HHOF 1978
Michel Plasse	Canada	1970–1971	1	1	0	0	–	0	3.00	–	–	–	–	–	–	–	
Bruce Racine	Canada	1995–1996	11	0	3	0	–	0	3.13	.881	1	0	0	0	0.00	0.000	
Terry Richardson	Canada	1978–1979	1	0	1	0	–	0	9.00	–	–	–	–	–	–	–	
Vincent Riendeau	Canada	1988–1992	122	58	45	16	–	4	3.34	.883	21	9	11	1	3.35	.887	
Cody Rudkowsky	Canada	2002–2003	1	1	1	0	–	0	0.00	1.000	–	–	–	–	–	–	
Curtis Sanford	Canada	2002–2007	73	26	26	0	10	4	2.79	.901	–	–	–	–	–	–	
Geoff Sarjeant	Canada	1994–1995	4	0	2	0	–	0	3.00	.885	–	–	–	–	–	–	
Marek Schwarz	Czech Republic	2006–2009	6	0	2	–	0	0	4.32	.809	–	–	–	–	–	–	
Paul Skidmore	United States	1981–1982	2	1	1	0	–	0	3.00	–	–	–	–	–	–	–	
Ed Staniowski	Canada	1975–1981	137	37	68	14	–	0	3.97	–	6	1	4	0	3.67	–	
Wayne Stephenson	Canada	1971–1974	87	31	37	12	–	3	3.12	–	3	1	0	0	5.25	–	
Hannu Toivonen	Finland	2007–2008	23	6	10	–	5	0	3.44	.878	–	–	–	–	–	–	
Roman Turek	Czech Republic	1999–2001	121	66	33	19	–	13	2.10	.907	21	12	9	0	2.40	.901	
Rick Wamsley	Canada	1984–1988	154	75	59	15	–	3	3.41	.888	14	5	9	1	3.30	.887	
Jim Watt	United States	1973–1974	1	0	0	0	–	0	6.00	–	–	–	–	–	–	–	

== Skaters ==
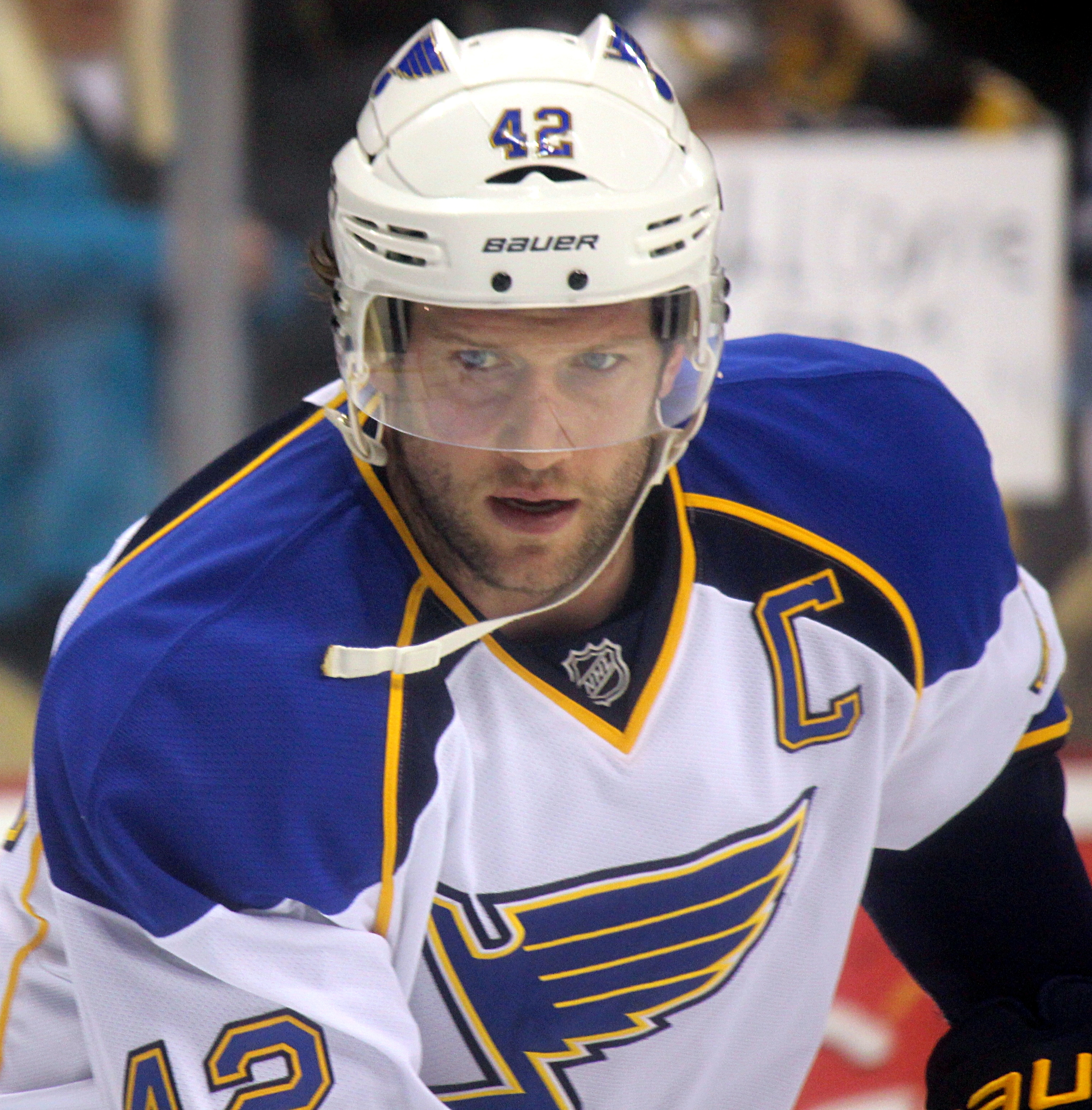
David Backes

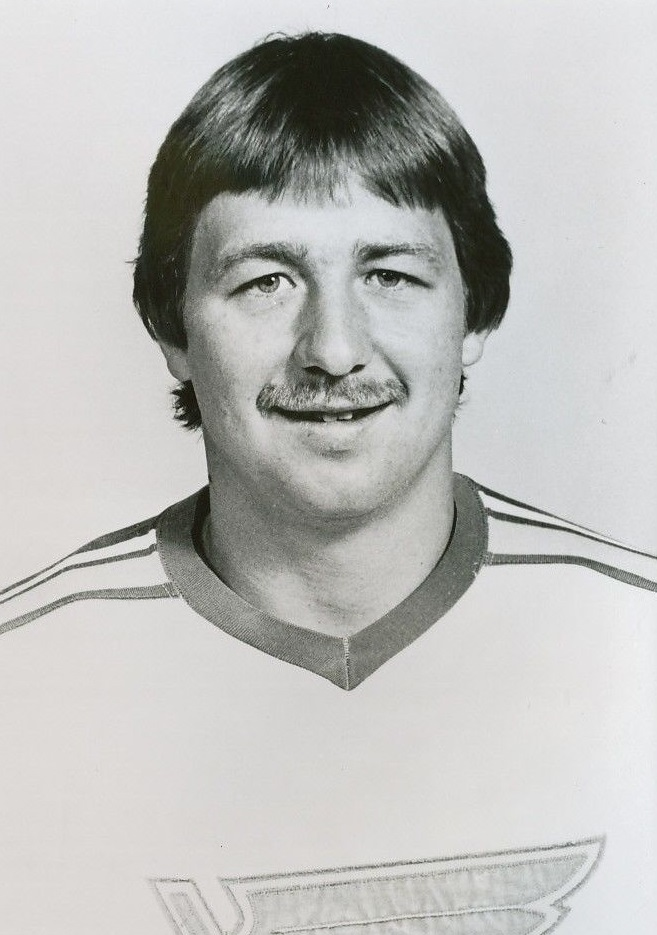
Bernie Federko

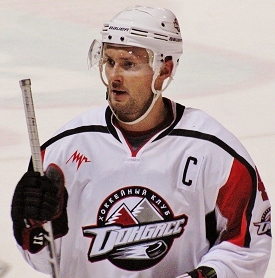
Sergei Varlamov

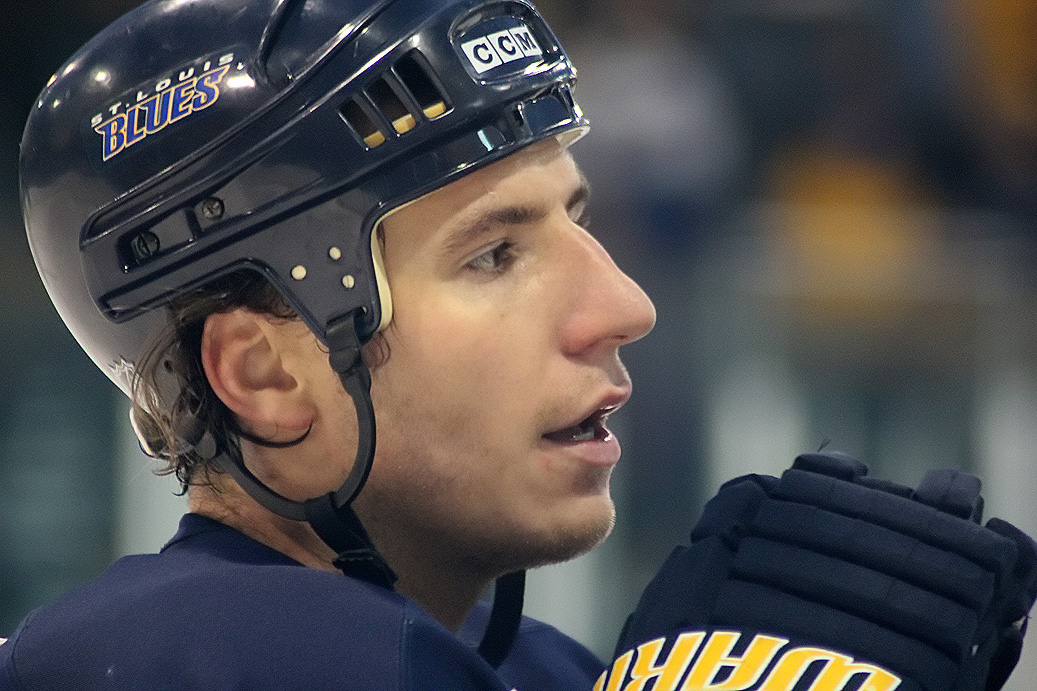
Alexander Steen

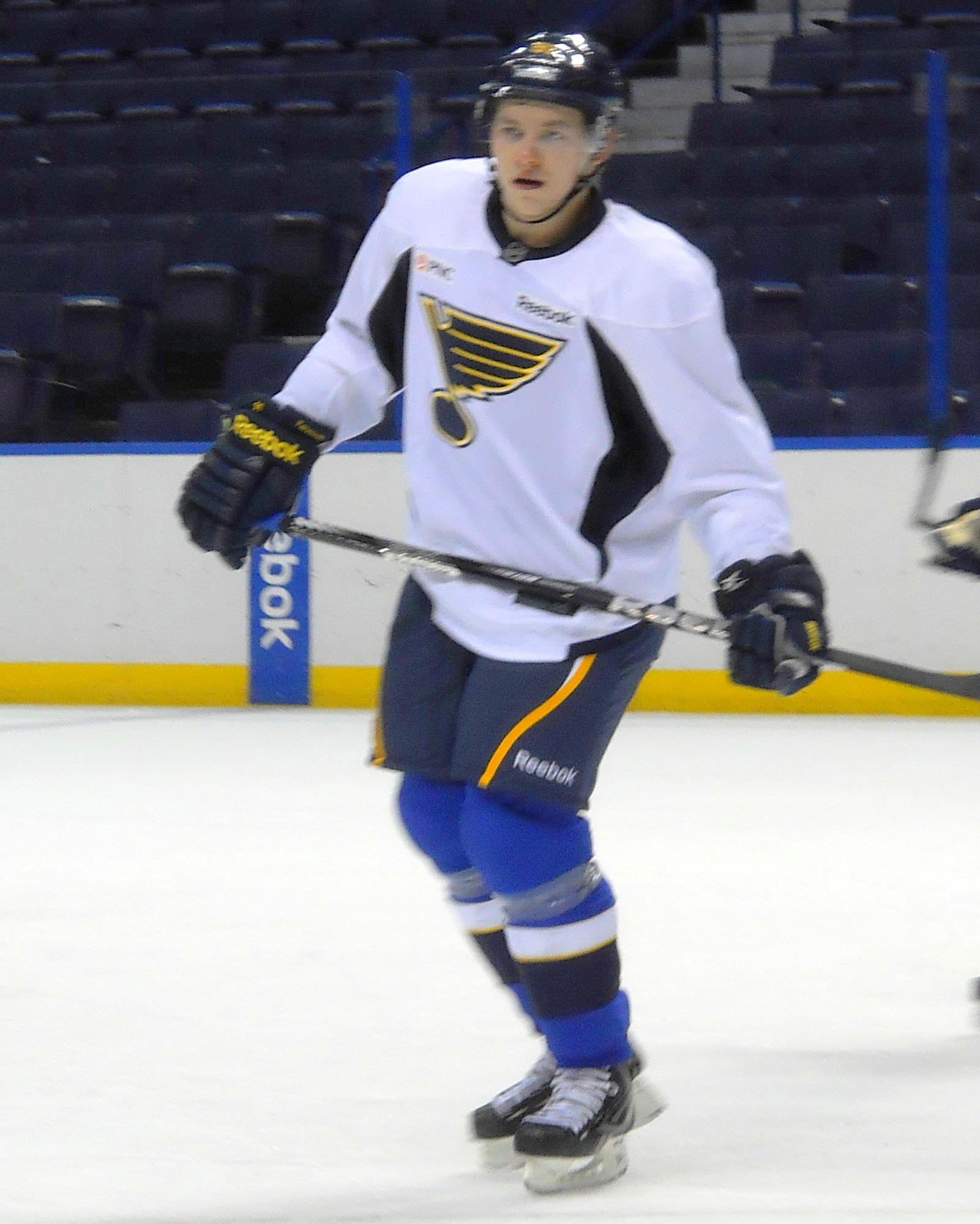
Vladimir Tarasenko

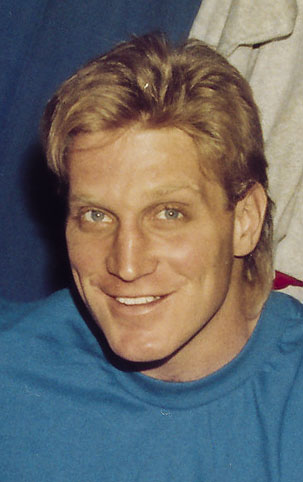
Brett Hull

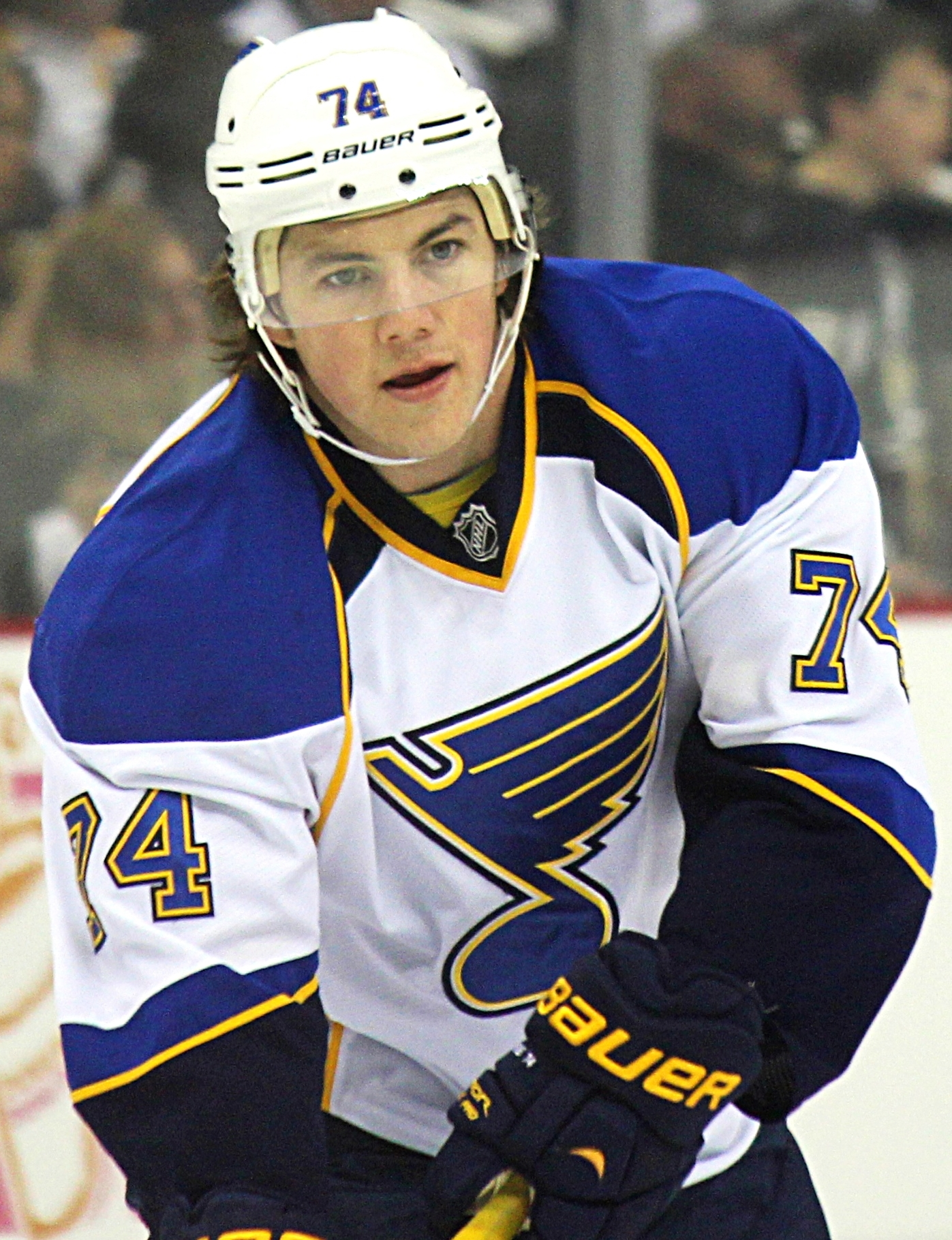
T. J. Oshie

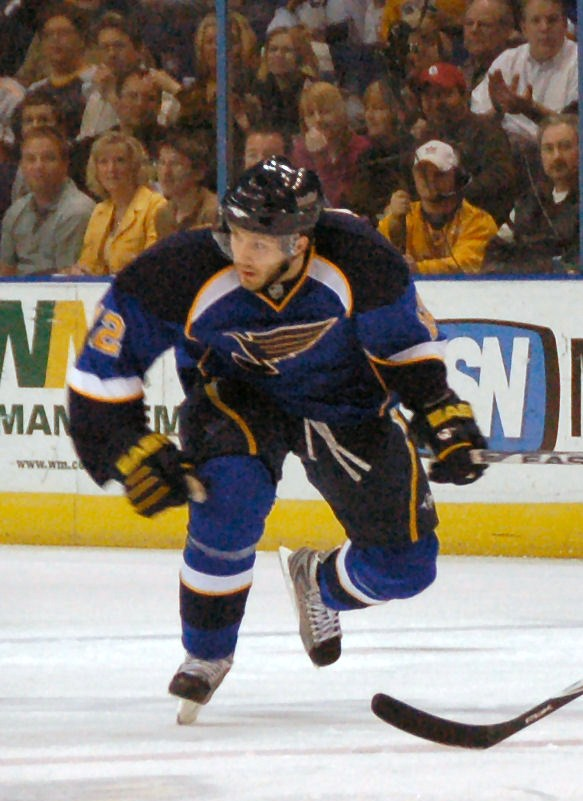
Lee Stempniak

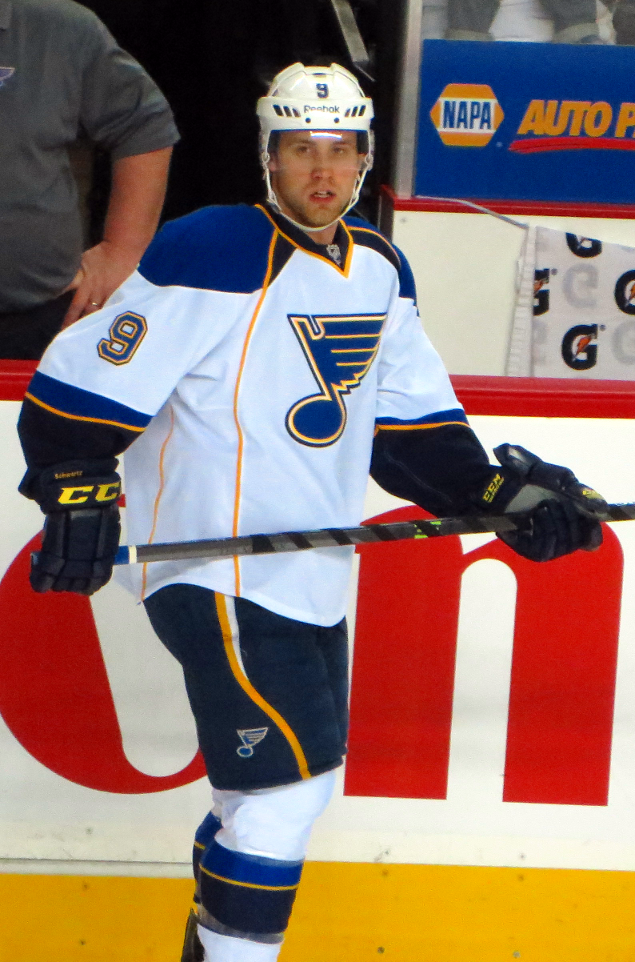
Jaden Schwartz

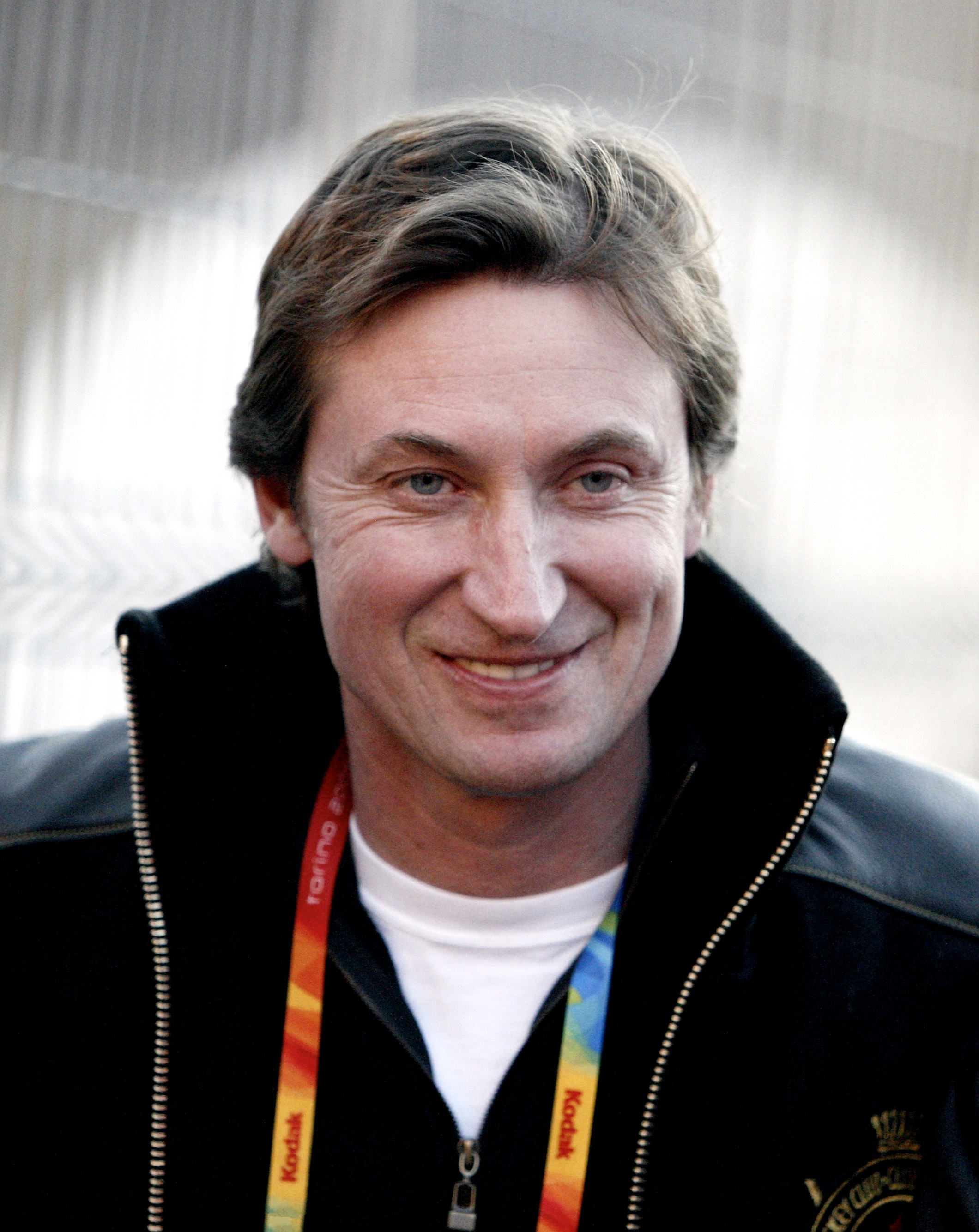
Wayne Gretzky

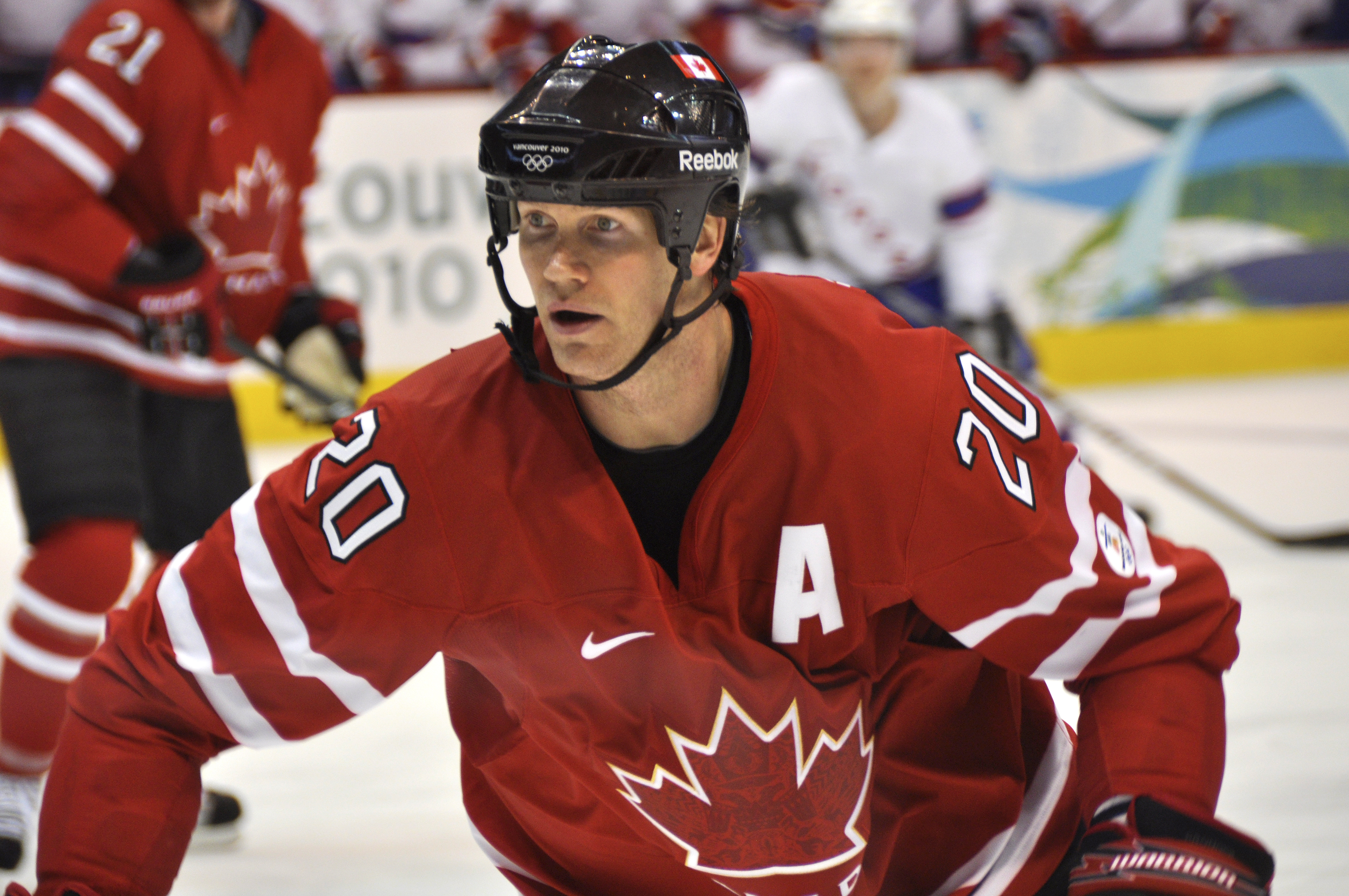
Chris Pronger

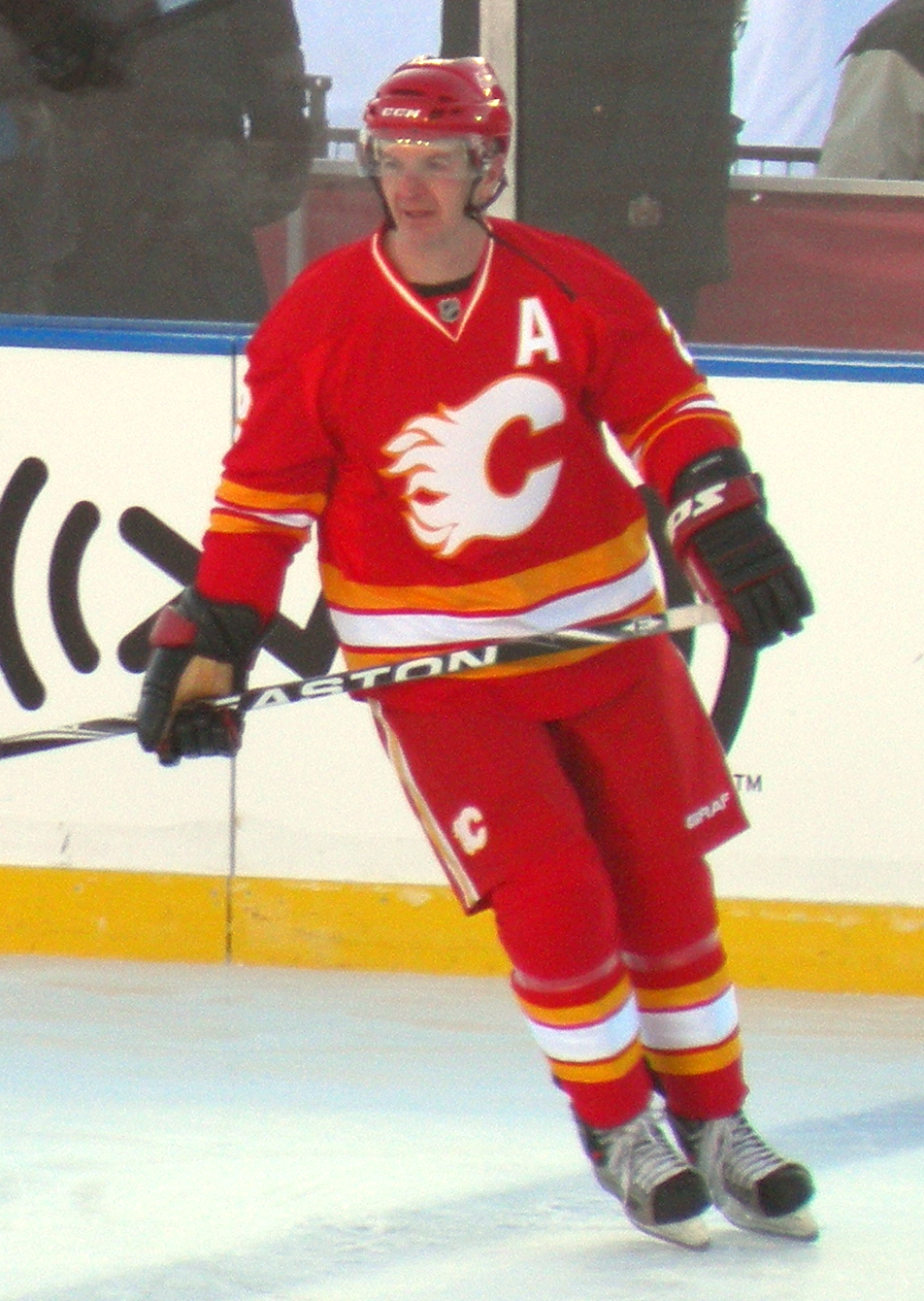
Al MacInnis

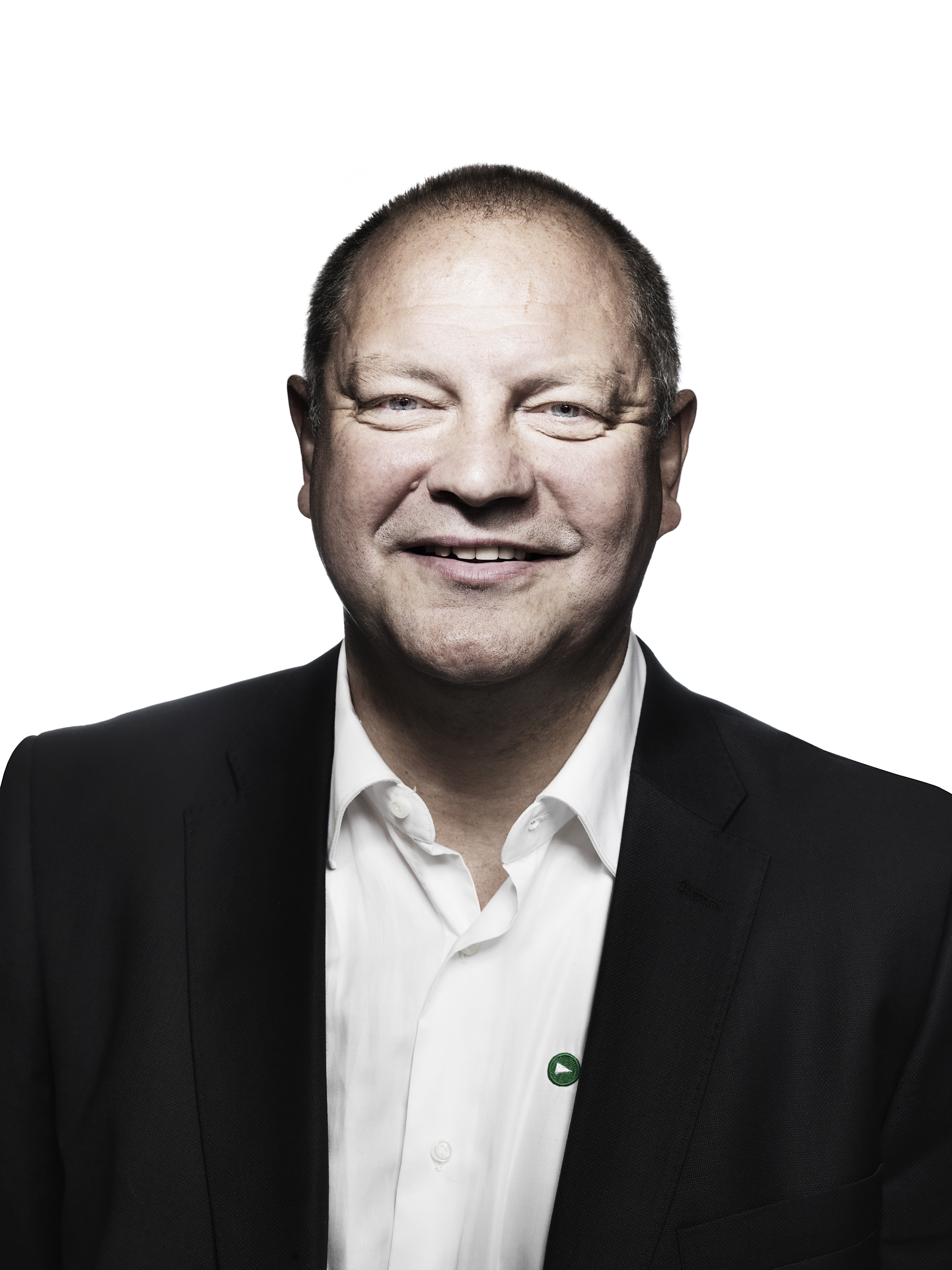
Esa Tikkanen

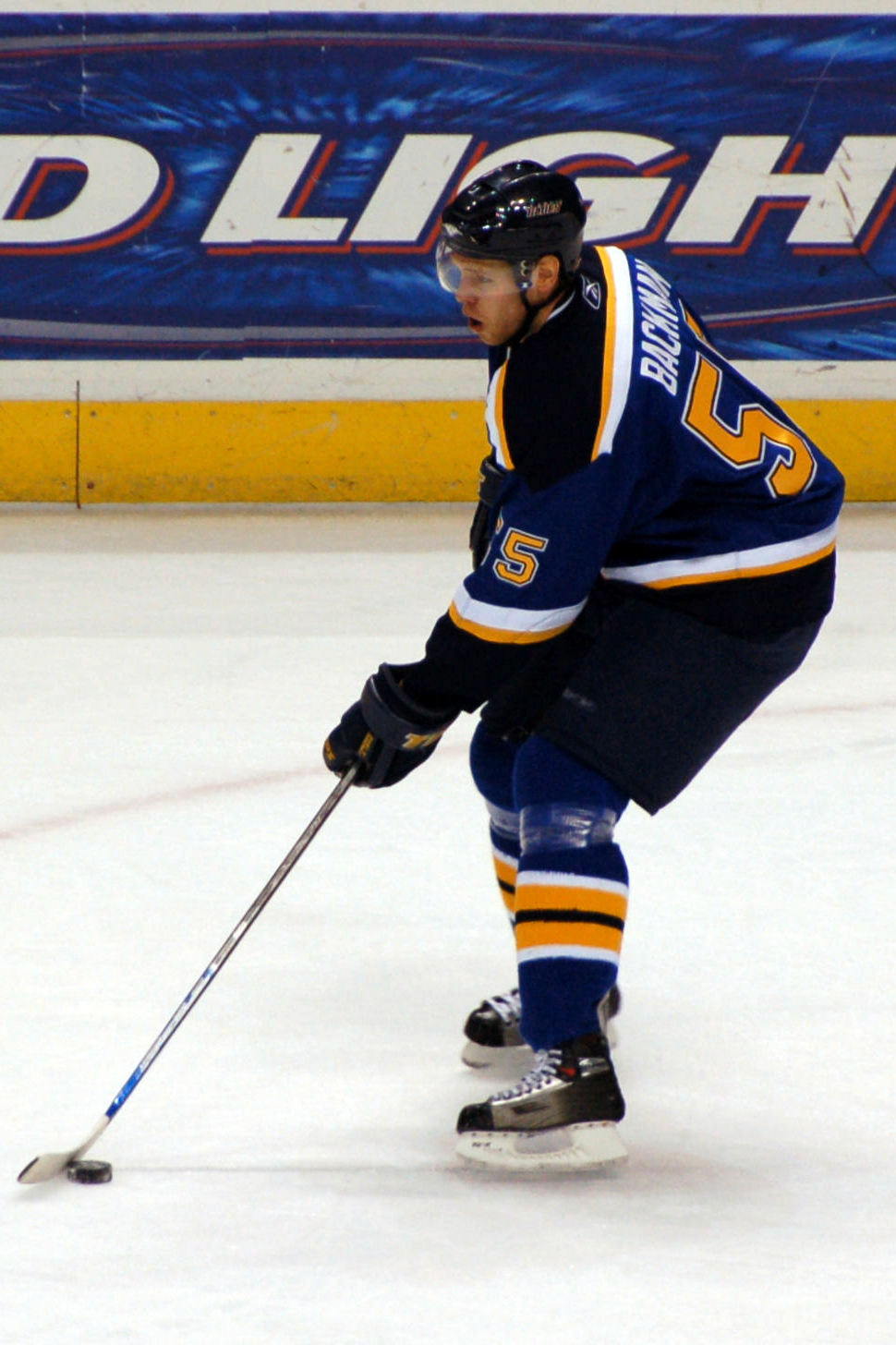
Christian Backman

Name	Nationality	Pos	Seasons	GP	G	A	P	PIM	GP	G	A	P	PIM	Notes
Name	Nationality	Pos	Seasons	Regular season					Playoffs					Notes
Noel Acciari	United States	C	2022—2023	54	10	8	18	10	—	—	—	—	—	
Bruce Affleck	Canada	D	1974—1979	274	14	65	79	86	8	0	0	0	0	
Kenny Agostino	United States	LW	2016—2017	7	1	2	3	2	—	—	—	—	—	
Nikita Alexandrov	Russia	C	2022—2024	51	3	6	9	12	—	—	—	—	—	
Glenn Anderson†	Canada	RW	1994—1995; 1995—1996	51	14	16	30	43	17	2	5	7	55	HHoF 2008
Perry Anderson	Canada	LW	1981—1985	144	22	18	40	355	22	2	0	2	38	
Ron Anderson	Canada	RW	1969—1970	59	9	9	18	36	1	0	0	0	0	
Lou Angotti	Canada	RW	1973—1974	51	12	23	35	9	–	–	–	–	–	
Al Arbour†	Canada	D	1967—1971	231	2	21	23	191	46	0	1	1	42	1996 HHoF; Captain, 1967–1970, 1971
John Arbour	Canada	D	1970—1972	70	1	6	7	91	5	0	0	0	0	
Derek Armstrong	Canada	D	1999—2000	4	0	0	0	0	–	–	–	–	–	
Blair Atcheynum	Canada	RW	1997—1998; 1998—1999	72	13	17	30	12	23	1	3	4	8	
Keith Aucoin	United States	C	2013—2014	2	0	0	0	0	–	–	–	–	–	
Ron Attwell	Canada	RW	1967—1968	18	1	7	8	6	–	–	–	–	–	
Don Awrey	Canada	D	1973—1975	95	5	24	29	55	–	–	–	–	–	
Mitch Babin	Canada	C	1975—1976	8	0	0	0	0	–	–	–	–	–	
Wayne Babych	Canada	RW	1978—1984	396	155	190	345	382	31	7	8	15	22	
David Backes	United States	C	2007—2016	727	206	254	460	969	49	12	15	27	40	Captain, 2011–2016
Christian Backman	Sweden	D	2002—2008	228	19	45	64	130	5	0	2	2	4	
Garnet Bailey	Canada	LW	1973—1975	71	22	29	51	133	–	–	–	–	–	
Bill Baker	United States	D	1981—1982	35	3	5	8	50	4	0	0	0	0	
Ivan Barbashev†	Russia	C	2016—2023	410	78	100	178	128	50	3	6	9	16	SC 2019
Murray Baron	Canada	D	1991—1997; 2003—2004	409	13	40	53	631	42	2	1	3	52	
Normand Baron	Canada	LW	1985—1986	23	2	0	2	39	–	–	–	–	–	
Dave Barr	Canada	RW	1983—1987	150	29	56	85	102	13	1	1	2	16	
Lubos Bartecko	Slovakia	LW	1998—2001	149	26	42	68	69	12	1	1	2	0	
Bob Bassen	Canada	C	1990—1994; 1999—2000	284	35	63	98	483	30	1	5	6	38	
Jeff Batters	Canada	D	1993—1995	16	0	0	0	28	–	–	–	–	–	
Norm Beaudin	Canada	RW	1967—1968	13	1	1	2	4	–	–	–	–	–	
Ed Beers	Canada	LW	1985—1986	24	7	11	18	24	19	3	4	7	8	
Derek Bekar	Canada	LW	1999—2000	1	0	0	0	0	–	–	–	–	–	
Bruce Bell	Canada	D	1985—1987	120	5	31	36	61	18	1	3	4	20	
Beau Bennett	United States	RW	2017—2018	6	0	0	0	0	—	—	—	—	—	
Curt Bennett	Canada	LW	1970—1972; 1977—1979	159	26	41	67	146	12	0	0	0	12	
Harvey Bennett	United States	C	1978—1979	52	3	9	12	63	–	–	–	–	–	
Brian Benning	Canada	D	1984—1990	232	30	94	124	321	29	3	13	16	58	
Andre Benoit	Canada	D	2015—2016	2	0	0	0	0	–	–	–	–	–	
Red Berenson	Canada	C	1967—1971; 1974—1978	519	172	240	412	194	55	16	12	28	41	Captain, 1970–1971, 1976, 1977–1978
Marc Bergevin	Canada	D	1996—2001; 2001—2002	328	5	23	28	319	30	1	2	3	26	
**Jonatan Berggren***	Sweden	RW	2025—2026	36	6	10	16	6	—	—	—	—	—	
Patrik Berglund	Sweden	C	2008—2018	694	168	154	322	242	60	10	16	26	24	
William Bitten	Canada	C	2022—2023	4	0	1	1	0	—	—	—	—	—	
**Nick Bjugstad***	United States	C	2025—2026	35	6	1	7	25	—	—	—	—	—	
Samuel Blais†	Canada	LW	2017—2021; 2022—2024	203	27	35	62	97	27	3	5	8	26	SC 2019
Eric Boguniecki	United States	C	2000—2006	125	29	36	65	66	9	1	3	4	2	
Zachary Bolduc	Canada	C	2023—2025	97	24	21	45	43	7	0	1	1	16	
Chris Bordeleau	Canada	C	1970—1972	119	29	41	70	54	5	0	1	1	17	
Jack Borotsik	Canada	C	1974—1975	1	0	0	0	0	–	–	–	–	–	
Robert Bortuzzo†	Canada	D	2014—2024	424	16	38	54	320	47	2	1	3	42	SC 2019
Tim Bothwell	Canada	D	1981—1985; 1986—1989	374	21	75	96	297	30	0	3	3	32	
Andre Boudrias	Canada	LW	1969—1970	50	3	14	17	20	14	2	4	6	4	
Jesse Boulerice	United States	RW	2005—2006	12	0	0	0	13	–	–	–	–	–	
Rick Bourbonnais	Canada	RW	1975—1978	71	9	15	24	29	4	0	1	1	0	
Charlie Bourgeois	Canada	D	1985—1988	127	4	20	24	358	25	2	2	4	143	
Jay Bouwmeester†	Canada	D	2012—2020	490	17	107	124	172	75	0	13	13	50	SC 2019
Rick Bowness	Canada	RW	1978—1980	34	2	5	7	41	–	–	–	–	–	
Brad Boyes	Canada	RW	2006—2011	327	106	126	232	106	4	2	1	3	0	
Tyler Bozak†	Canada	C	2018—2022	220	34	62	96	54	50	8	11	19	10	SC 2019
Steve Bozek	Canada	LW	1987—1988	7	0	0	0	2	7	1	1	2	6	
Philippe Bozon	France	LW	1991—1995	144	16	25	41	101	19	2	0	2	31	
Curt Brackenbury	Canada	RW	1982—1983	6	1	0	1	6	–	–	–	–	–	
Carl Brewer	Canada	D	1970—1972	61	4	25	29	69	5	0	2	2	8	
Eric Brewer	Canada	D	2005—2011	332	30	65	95	332	–	–	–	–	–	Captain, 2008–2011
Aris Brimanis	Canada	D	2003—2004	13	0	0	0	4	–	–	–	–	–	
Rod Brind'Amour	Canada	C	1988—1991	157	43	67	110	139	30	9	13	22	20	
**Philip Broberg***	Sweden	D	2024—2026	149	14	49	63	32	7	1	1	2	2	
Kyle Brodziak	Canada	C	2015—2018	226	25	34	59	97	30	2	2	4	8	
Gord Brooks	Canada	RW	1971—1972; 1973—1974	32	6	8	14	12	–	–	–	–	–	
Paul Broten	United States	RW	1995—1996	17	0	1	1	4	–	–	–	–	–	
Troy Brouwer	Canada	RW	2015—2016; 2019—2020	95	19	21	40	69	24	9	5	14	30	
Jeff Brown	Canada	D	1989—1994	329	80	214	294	218	42	10	28	38	18	
Logan Brown	United States	C	2021—2023	69	6	11	17	16	–	–	–	–	–	
Jack Brownschidle	United States	D	1977—1984	455	36	156	192	132	26	0	5	5	18	
David Bruce	Canada	LW	1990—1991	12	1	2	3	14	2	0	0	0	2	
Ron Buchanan	Canada	C	1969—1970	2	0	0	0	0	–	–	–	–	–	
Mike Bullard	Canada	C	1988—1989	20	4	12	16	46	–	–	–	–	–	
**Pavel Buchnevich***	Russia	LW	2021—2026	373	123	188	311	167	19	4	15	19	20	
Valeri Bure	Russia	RW	2002—2003	5	0	2	2	0	6	0	2	2	8	
Garth Butcher	Canada	D	1990—1994	208	11	35	46	508	29	4	4	8	90	Captain, 1991–1992
Jerry Butler	Canada	RW	1975—1978	155	29	46	75	145	7	0	0	0	14	
Chris Butler	United States	D	2014—2019	58	4	7	11	29	–	–	–	–	–	
Gordon Buynak	United States	D	1974—1975	4	0	0	0	2	–	–	–	–	–	
Petr Cajanek	Czech Republic	RW	2002—2007	269	46	107	153	144	7	0	2	2	4	
Craig Cameron	Canada	RW	1967—1971	182	32	13	45	80	22	3	0	3	15	
Jim Campbell	United States	RW	1996—2000	201	49	60	109	173	14	8	3	11	18	
Scott Campbell	Canada	D	1981—1982	3	0	0	0	52	–	–	–	–	–	
Guy Carbonneau	Canada	C	1994—1995	42	5	11	16	16	7	1	2	3	6	
Claude Cardin	Canada	LW	1967—1968	1	0	0	0	0	–	–	–	–	–	
Jack Carlson	United States	LW	1982—1984	112	12	9	21	153	9	0	0	0	7	
Kent Carlson	United States	D	1985—1986; 1987–1988	26	2	3	5	42	8	0	0	0	13	
Jordan Caron	Canada	RW	2015—2017	4	0	0	0	0	–	–	–	–	–	
Gene Carr	Canada	C	1971—1972	15	3	2	5	9	–	–	–	–	–	
Gino Cavallini	Canada	LW	1985—1992	454	91	120	211	429	67	14	19	33	62	
Paul Cavallini	Canada	D	1987—1993	337	37	120	157	514	49	7	15	22	86	
Blair Chapman	Canada	RW	1979—1983	175	58	74	132	87	15	2	5	7	6	
Kelly Chase	Canada	RW	1989—1994; 1997—2000	345	14	26	40	1,497	27	1	1	2	100	1997—1998 King Clancy Memorial Trophy
Denis Chasse	Canada	RW	1993—1996	92	10	10	20	256	7	1	7	8	23	
Vladimir Chebaturkin	Russia	D	2000—2001	22	1	2	3	26	–	–	–	–	–	
Taylor Chorney	United States	D	2011—2012	2	0	0	0	0	–	–	–	–	–	
Guy Chouinard	Canada	RW	1983—1984	64	12	34	46	10	5	0	2	2	0	
Dave Christian	United States	RW	1991—1992	78	20	34	44	41	4	3	0	3	0	
Dale Clarke	Canada	D	2000—2001	3	0	0	0	0	–	–	–	–	–	
Kyle Clifford	Canada	LW	2020—2022	52	4	4	8	30	4	0	1	1	0	
Carlo Colaiacovo	Canada	D	2008—2012; 2013—2014	284	19	91	110	152	11	0	3	3	18	
Ian Cole	United States	D	2010—2015	167	9	22	31	142	2	0	0	0	0	
Bill Collins	Canada	RW	1973—1975	82	24	17	41	48	2	1	0	1	0	
Bob Collyard	United States	C	1973—1974	10	1	3	4	4	–	–	–	–	–	
Wayne Connelly	Canada	C	1970—1972	43	10	21	31	11	6	2	1	3	0	
Craig Conroy	United States	C	1996—2001	359	57	94	151	209	36	3	3	6	24	
Daniel Corso	Canada	C	2000—2003	70	14	10	24	20	14	0	1	1	0	
Shayne Corson	Canada	LW	1995—1997	88	20	29	49	216	13	8	6	14	22	Captain, 1995–1996
Geoff Courtnall	Canada	LW	1995—2000	326	106	126	232	371	42	7	16	23	65	
Bruce Cowick	Canada	LW	1975—1976	5	0	0	0	2	–	–	–	–	–	
Craig Coxe	United States	LW	1988—1989	41	0	7	7	127	–	–	–	–	–	
Adam Cracknell	Canada	RW	2010—2014	65	6	10	16	12	10	1	0	1	0	
Bob Crawford	Canada	RW	1979—1983	38	6	10	16	4	4	0	0	0	0	
Adam Creighton	Canada	C	1994—1996	109	25	30	55	17	20	3	1	4	34	
Terry Crisp	Canada	C	1967—1972	285	38	64	102	51	64	8	15	23	32	
B. J. Crombeen	United States	RW	2008—2012	265	26	23	49	515	11	1	0	1	43	
Mike Crombeen	United States	RW	1978—1983	325	47	53	100	164	27	6	2	8	32	
Doug Crossman	Canada	D	1992—1994	69	4	14	18	20	–	–	–	–	–	
Tony Currie	Canada	RW	1977—1982	207	68	88	156	63	13	4	12	16	4	
Paul Curtis	Canada	D	1972—1973	29	1	4	5	6	5	0	0	0	2	
Denis Cyr	Canada	RW	1984—1986	40	8	7	15	2	3	0	0	0	0	
Matt D'Agostini	Canada	RW	2009—2013	160	31	35	66	71	4	1	0	1	4	
J. J. Daigneault	Canada	D	1995—1996	37	1	3	4	24	3	0	0	0	0	
Kevin Dallman	Canada	D	2005—2006	46	4	9	13	21	–	–	–	–	–	
Mike Danton	Canada	C	2003—2004	68	7	5	12	141	5	1	0	1	2	
Mike Dark	Canada	D	1986—1988	43	5	6	11	14	–	–	–	–	–	
Jacob de la Rose	Sweden	LW	2019—2021	47	1	5	6	13	5	0	0	0	0	
Zach Dean	Canada	C	2023—2024	9	0	0	0	6	—	—	—	—	—	
Stefan Della Rovere	Canada	LW	2010—2011	7	0	0	0	11	–	–	–	–	–	
Gilbert Delorme	Canada	D	1983—1985	118	2	17	19	94	14	1	3	4	11	
Michael Del Zotto	Canada	D	2018—2019	7	0	3	3	0	—	—	—	—	—	
Ab DeMarco	United States	D	1972—1974	37	7	18	25	13	4	1	1	2	2	
Pavol Demitra	Slovakia	LW	1996—2004	494	204	289	493	160	66	18	25	43	26	1999–2000 Lady Byng Memorial Trophy
Norm Dennis	Canada	C	1968—1972	12	3	0	3	11	5	0	0	0	2	
Robert Dirk	Canada	D	1987—1991	94	2	6	8	255	9	0	1	1	2	
Jon DiSalvatore	United States	RW	2005—2006	5	0	0	0	2	–	–	–	–	–	
Ted Donato	United States	LW	2001—2002	2	0	0	0	2	–	–	–	–	–	
Andre Dore	Canada	D	1982—1984	93	5	27	32	83	4	0	1	1	8	
Aaron Downey	Canada	RW	2005—2006	17	2	0	2	45	–	–	–	–	–	
Dallas Drake	Canada	RW	2000—2007	443	64	106	170	386	35	6	7	13	49	Captain, 2005–2007
Nick Drazenovic	Canada	C	2010—2011	3	0	0	0	0	–	–	–	–	–	
**Jonathan Drouin***	Canada	LW	2025—2026	9	1	2	3	0	—	—	—	—	—	
Steve Dubinsky	Canada	C	2002—2003	28	0	6	6	4	–	–	–	–	–	
Steve Duchesne	Canada	D	1993—1995; 1997—1998	163	38	87	125	82	21	0	10	10	10	
Luc Dufour	Canada	LW	1984—1985	23	1	3	4	18	1	0	0	0	0	
Donald Dufresne	Canada	D	1994—1996	25	0	3	3	14	3	0	0	0	0	
Vince Dunn†	Canada	D	2017—2021	267	32	70	102	110	29	2	9	11	16	SC 2019
Denis Dupere	Canada	LW	1974—1975	22	3	6	9	8	—	—	—	—	—	
Andre Dupont	Canada	D	1971—1973	85	4	16	20	198	11	1	0	1	20	
Micki DuPont	Canada	D	2007—2008	2	0	0	0	2	—	—	—	—	—	
Steve Durbano	Canada	D	1972—1974; 1978—1979	98	8	24	32	480	5	0	2	2	8	
Radek Dvorak	Czech Republic	RW	2006—2007	82	10	27	37	48	—	—	—	—	—	
**Dalibor Dvorsky***	Slovakia	C	2024—2026	73	12	9	21	26	–	–	–	–	–	
Dallas Eakins	United States	D	1995—1996	16	0	1	1	34	—	—	—	—	—	
Mike Eastwood	Canada	C	1997—2003	336	43	66	109	151	48	3	4	7	20	
Tim Ecclestone	Canada	LW	1967—1971	230	48	76	124	140	40	6	8	14	70	
Darryl Edestrand	Canada	D	1967—1968	12	0	0	0	2	—	—	—	—	—	
Joel Edmundson†	Canada	D	2015—2019	269	13	39	52	248	49	5	9	14	32	SC 2019
Jack Egers	Canada	RW	1971—1974	147	45	50	95	66	16	1	5	6	16	
Todd Elik	Canada	C	1994—1995	13	2	4	6	4	7	4	3	7	2	
Lars Eller	Denmark	C	2009—2010	7	2	0	2	4	—	—	—	—	—	
Dave Ellett	United States	D	1999—2000	52	2	8	10	12	7	0	1	1	2	
Kari Eloranta	Finland	D	1981—1982	12	1	7	8	6	5	0	0	0	0	
Nelson Emerson	Canada	RW	1990—1993	165	45	90	135	130	17	4	9	13	27	
Chris Evans	Canada	D	1971—1974	153	13	20	33	41	12	1	1	2	8	
Doug Evans	Canada	LW	1985—1990	163	16	32	48	223	14	1	2	3	26	
Shawn Evans	Canada	D	1985—1986	7	0	0	0	2	—	—	—	—	—	
Todd Ewen	Canada	RW	1986—1990	124	10	7	17	493	12	0	0	0	65	
**Robby Fabbri***†	Canada	C	2015—2020; 2025—2026	179	33	44	77	72	30	5	11	16	6	SC 2019
Bill Fairbairn	Canada	RW	1977—1979	65	15	16	31	10	—	—	—	—	—	
Cade Fairchild	United States	D	2011—2012	5	0	1	1	0	—	—	—	—	—	
Radek Faksa	Czech Republic	C	2024—2025	70	5	10	15	30	7	1	4	5	2	
**Justin Faulk***	United States	D	2019—2026	482	56	176	232	245	30	3	9	12	22	
Glen Featherstone	Canada	D	1988—1991	144	5	29	34	371	27	0	2	2	103	
Bernie Federko†	Canada	C	1976—1989	927	352	721	1,073	463	91	35	66	101	83	2002 HHOF; Captain, 1988–1989
Denny Felsner	United States	LW	1991—1995	18	1	4	5	6	10	2	3	5	2	
Ray Ferraro	Canada	C	2001—2002	15	6	4	10	8	10	0	3	3	4	
**Jack Finley***	Canada	C	2025—2026	22	0	2	2	17	—	—	—	—	—	
Jeff Finley	Canada	D	1998—2004	371	6	28	34	206	39	1	4	5	28	
Rory Fitzpatrick	United States	D	1996—1999	3	0	0	0	4	—	—	—	—	—	
Ron Flockhart	Canada	C	1985—1988	160	43	68	111	42	8	1	3	4	6	
Connie Forey	Canada	LW	1973—1974	4	0	0	0	2	—	—	—	—	—	
Ray Fortin	Canada	D	1967—1970	92	2	6	8	33	6	0	0	0	8	
**Cam Fowler***	United States	D	2024—2026	133	13	53	66	22	7	2	8	10	0	
Colin Fraser	Canada	C	2014—2015	1	0	0	0	0	—	—	—	—	—	
Len Frig	Canada	D	1977—1980	37	1	5	6	49	3	0	0	0	0	
Simon Gamache	Canada	C	2005—2006	15	3	4	7	10	—	—	—	—	—	
Perry Ganchar	Canada	RW	1983—1985	8	0	2	2	0	7	3	1	4	0	
Dave Gardner	Canada	C	1973—1975	23	5	4	9	6	—	—	—	—	—	
Bob Gassoff	Canada	D	1973—1977	245	11	47	58	866	9	0	1	1	16	
Adam Gaudette	United States	C	2023—2024	2	0	0	0	4	—	—	—	—	—	
Barry Gibbs	Canada	D	1977—1979	127	8	39	47	91	—	—	—	—	—	Captain, 1978–1979
Greg Gilbert	Canada	LW	1994—1996	63	11	15	26	19	7	0	3	3	6	
Stan Gilbertson	United States	LW	1974—1975	22	1	4	5	4	—	—	—	—	—	
Curt Giles	Canada	D	1991—1993	61	1	5	6	48	6	1	1	2	2	
Todd Gill	Canada	D	1997—1999	39	7	7	14	26	10	2	2	4	10	
Doug Gilmour†	Canada	C	1983—1988	384	149	205	354	264	49	17	38	55	71	2011 HHoF
Gaston Gingras	Canada	D	1987—1989	120	10	32	42	24	17	1	4	5	6	
Larry Giroux	Canada	D	1973—1974; 1978—1980	150	10	39	49	174	—	—	—	—	—	
Mike Glumac	Canada	RW	2005—2008	40	7	6	13	38	—	—	—	—	—	
Marcel Goc	Germany	C	2014—2015	31	1	2	3	4	4	0	0	0	0	
Scott Gomez	United States	C	2015—2016	21	1	7	8	4	–	–	–	–	–	
Phil Goyette	Canada	C	1969—1970	72	29	49	78	16	16	3	11	14	6	1969-1970 Lady Byng Memorial Trophy
Evgeny Grachev	Russia	C	2011—2012	26	1	3	4	2	—	—	—	—	—	
Terry Gray	Canada	RW	1968—1970	36	6	5	11	21	28	5	3	8	12	
Wayne Gretzky†	Canada	C	1995—1996	18	8	13	21	2	13	2	14	16	0	1999 HHoF; Captain, 1996
Bill Guerin	United States	RW	2006—2007	61	28	19	47	52	—	—	—	—	—	
Carl Gunnarsson†	Sweden	D	2014—2021	325	15	37	52	87	61	1	5	6	19	SC 2019
Alexei Gusarov	Russia	D	2000—2001	16	0	4	4	6	13	0	0	0	4	
Jean Hamel	Canada	D	1972—1974	78	3	8	11	30	2	0	0	0	0	
Chuck Hamilton	Canada	LW	1972—1973	3	0	2	2	2	—	—	—	—	—	
Inge Hammarstrom	Sweden	LW	1977—1979	135	31	41	72	12	—	—	—	—	—	
Ron Handy	Canada	LW	1987—1988	4	0	1	1	0	—	—	—	—	—	
Michal Handzus	Slovakia	D	1998—2001	183	39	54	93	86	18	0	5	5	14	
Richie Hansen	United States	C	1981—1982	2	0	2	2	0	—	—	—	—	—	
Nick Harbaruk	Poland	RW	1973—1974	56	5	14	19	16	—	—	—	—	—	
Scott Harlow	United States	LW	1987—1988	1	0	1	1	0	—	—	—	—	—	
Terry Harper	Canada	D	1979—1980	11	1	5	6	6	3	0	0	0	2	
Ted Harris	Canada	D	1973—1974	24	0	4	4	16	—	—	—	—	—	
Gerry Hart	Canada	D	1980—1983	106	4	12	16	236	20	0	3	3	60	
Doug Harvey†	Canada	D	1968—1969	70	2	20	22	30	8	0	4	4	12	1973 HHoF
Martin Havlat	Czech Republic	RW	2015—2016	2	1	0	1	0	–	–	–	–	–	
Dale Hawerchuk†	Canada	C	1995—1996	66	13	28	41	22	—	—	—	—	—	2001 HHoF
Kevin Hayes	United States	RW	2023—2024	79	13	16	29	12	—	—	—	—	—	
Jochen Hecht	Germany	LW	1998—2001	138	32	46	78	76	27	8	10	18	6	
Bret Hedican	United States	D	1991—1994	107	1	19	20	94	15	0	0	0	14	
Jeff Heerema	Canada	RW	2003—2004	22	1	2	3	4	—	—	—	—	—	
Bryan Helmer	Canada	D	1998—2000	44	1	5	6	29	—	—	—	—	—	
Colin Hemingway	Canada	RW	2005—2006	3	0	0	0	0	—	—	—	—	—	
Camille Henry	Canada	C	1968—1970	68	18	24	42	8	11	2	5	7	0	
T. J. Hensick	United States	C	2010—2011	13	1	2	3	2	—	—	—	—	—	
Bob Hess	Canada	D	1974—1981	293	27	87	114	164	3	0	1	1	2	
Pat Hickey	Canada	LW	1982—1985	127	19	24	43	56	14	1	1	2	8	
Matthew Highmore	Canada	LW	2022—2023	2	0	0	0	0	—	—	—	—	—	
Sean Hill	United States	D	2000—2002	71	1	13	14	79	15	0	1	1	12	
Dan Hinote	United States	RW	2007—2009	150	11	14	25	129	3	0	0	0	4	
Mike Hoffman	Canada	C/LW	2020—2021	52	17	19	36	10	4	1	0	1	4	
Jeff Hoggan	Canada	RW	2005—2006	52	2	6	8	34	—	—	—	—	—	
**Justin Holl***	United States	D	2025—2026	9	1	1	2	6	—	—	—	—	—	
Terry Hollinger	Canada	D	1993—1995	7	0	0	0	2	—	—	—	—	—	
**Dylan Holloway***	Canada	C	2024—2026	136	48	66	114	30	–	–	–	–	–	
Gary Holt	Canada	LW	1977—1978	49	7	4	11	81	—	—	—	—	—	
Ron Hoover	Canada	C	1991—1992	1	0	0	0	0	—	—	—	—	—	
Larry Hornung	Canada	D	1970—1972	48	2	9	11	10	11	0	2	2	2	
Bill Houlder	Canada	D	1994—1995	41	5	13	18	16	4	1	1	2	0	
Phil Housley†	United States	D	1993—1994	26	7	15	22	12	4	2	1	3	4	2015 HHoF
Dave Hrechkosy	Canada	LW	1975—1977	28	4	5	9	2	3	1	0	1	2	
Tony Hrkac	Canada	C	1987—1990; 1993—1994	201	39	82	121	46	21	7	2	9	4	
Fran Huck	Canada	C	1970—1971; 1972—1973	87	23	28	51	38	11	3	4	7	2	
Fred Hucul	Canada	D	1967—1968	43	2	13	15	30	—	—	—	—	—	
Charlie Huddy	Canada	D	1995—1996	12	0	0	0	6	13	1	0	1	8	
Mike Hudson	Canada	C	1995—1996	32	3	12	15	26	2	0	1	1	4	
Brent Hughes	Canada	D	1972—1974	10	1	1	2	0	—	—	—	—	—	
Pat Hughes	Canada	RW	1986—1987	43	1	5	6	26	—	—	—	—	—	
Brett Hull†	United States	RW	1987—1998	744	527	409	936	286	102	67	50	117	51	2009 HHoF; 1990 Lady Byng Memorial Trophy; 1991 Hart Memorial Trophy; 1991 Ted Lindsay Award; Captain, 1992–1995
Brad Hunt	Canada	D	2016—2017	9	1	4	5	2	—	—	—	—	—	
Mark Hunter	Canada	RW	1985—1988	218	112	94	206	474	29	9	13	22	82	
Ted Irvine	Canada	LW	1975—1977	138	24	27	51	118	6	0	2	2	4	
Barret Jackman	Canada	D	2001—2015	803	28	153	181	1,026	39	2	5	7	62	
Craig Janney	United States	C	1991—1995	186	48	185	233	38	39	2	5	7	62	
Cam Janssen	United States	RW	2007—2011	165	2	7	9	470	1	0	0	0	0	
Jakub Jerabek	Czech Republic	D	2018—2019	1	0	0	0	2	—	—	—	—	—	
Jaroslav Jirik	Czechoslovakia	LW	1969—1970	3	0	0	0	0	—	—	—	—	—	
Dmitrij Jaskin	Czech Republic	RW	2012—2018	266	25	36	61	82	14	2	2	4	11	
Craig Johnson	United States	LW	1994—1996	64	11	10	21	36	1	0	0	0	2	
Erik Johnson	United States	D	2007—2011	203	20	71	91	144	—	—	—	—	—	
Mark Johnson	United States	C	1984—1985	17	4	6	10	2	3	0	1	1	0	
Ryan Johnson	Canada	C	2002—2008	289	19	30	49	122	9	0	2	2	6	
Terry Johnson	Canada	D	1983—1986	188	2	17	19	350	14	0	1	1	44	
Olli Jokinen	Finland	C	2014—2015	8	1	2	3	0	—	—	—	—	—	
**Mathieu Joseph***	Canada	RW	2024—2026	99	6	19	25	32	3	1	0	1	10	
Pierre-Olivier Joseph	Canada	D	2024—2025	23	0	2	2	23	–	–	–	–	–	
Dakota Joshua	United States	C	2020—2022	42	4	5	9	23	1	0	0	0	0	
Jonas Junland	Sweden	D	2008—2010	4	0	2	2	2	—	—	—	—	—	
Gordon Kannegiesser	Canada	D	1967—1968; 1971—1972	23	0	1	1	15	—	—	—	—	—	
Kasperi Kapanen	Finland	RW	2022—2025	106	15	22	37	26	—	—	—	—	—	
Vitali Karamnov	Russia	LW	1992—1995	92	12	20	32	65	2	0	0	0	2	
Paul Kariya	Canada	LW	2007—2010	168	36	87	123	88	—	—	—	—	—	
Alexei Kasatonov	Russia	D	1993—1994	8	0	2	2	19	4	2	0	2	2	
**Alexander Kaskimaki***	Finland	C	2025—2026	5	0	0	0	0	—	—	—	—	—	
Ed Kea	Canada	D	1979—1983	267	8	53	61	225	24	2	3	5	30	
Mike Keane	Canada	RW	2001—2002	56	4	6	10	22	—	—	—	—	—	
Larry Keenan	Canada	LW	1967—1971	152	28	43	71	18	46	15	16	31	12	
Bob Kelly	Canada	LW	1973—1974	37	9	8	17	45	—	—	—	—	—	
Chris Kenady	United States	RW	1997—1998	5	0	2	2	0	—	—	—	—	—	
**Matthew Kessel***	United States	D	2022—2026	99	3	10	13	32	—	—	—	—	—	
Alexander Khavanov	Russia	D	2000—2004	284	21	69	90	173	26	5	5	10	18	
Yuri Khmylev	Russia	LW	1995—1997	9	1	1	2	2	—	—	—	—	—	
Darin Kimble	Canada	RW	1990—1992	72	2	4	6	294	18	0	0	0	45	
D. J. King	Canada	C	2006—2010	101	4	5	9	185	—	—	—	—	—	
Derek King	Canada	LW	1999—2000	19	2	7	9	6	—	—	—	—	—	
Klim Kostin	Russia	C/LW	2019—2022	46	5	6	11	23	—	—	—	—	—	
Ralph Klassen	Canada	C	1979—1984	225	18	37	55	45	24	4	2	6	12	
Fred Knipscheer	United States	C	1995—1996	1	0	0	0	2	—	—	—	—	—	
David Koci	Czech Republic	LW	2008—2009	4	0	0	0	9	—	—	—	—	—	
Tom Koivisto	Finland	D	2002—2003	22	2	4	6	10	—	—	—	—	—	
Neil Komadoski	Canada	D	1977—1980	124	3	22	25	155	—	—	—	—	—	
Igor Korolev	Russia	C	1992—1994	147	10	33	43	60	5	0	0	0	0	
Igor Kravchuk	Russia	D	1995—1997	122	7	36	43	59	12	1	5	6	4	
Torey Krug	United States	D	2020—2024	255	22	124	146	154	7	0	5	5	2	
Murray Kuntz	Canada	LW	1974—1975	7	1	2	3	0	—	—	—	—	—	
**Jordan Kyrou***	Canada	C	2018—2026	488	168	210	378	116	28	11	2	13	4	
Neil LaBatte	Canada	RW	1978—1979; 1981—1982	26	0	2	2	19	—	—	—	—	—	
Nathan LaFayette	Canada	C	1993—1994	38	2	3	5	14	—	—	—	—	—	
Roger Lafreniere	Canada	LW	1972—1973	10	0	0	0	0	—	—	—	—	—	
Mike Lalor	United States	D	1988—1990	114	1	30	31	135	22	1	3	4	45	
Dick Lamby	United States	D	1978—1981	22	0	5	5	22	—	—	—	—	—	
Mike Lampman	United States	LW	1972—1974	33	3	3	6	2	—	—	—	—	—	
Jamie Langenbrunner	United States	RW	2011—2013	74	6	19	25	32	9	1	0	1	11	
Daniel Laperriere	Canada	D	1992—1995	29	1	4	5	23	—	—	—	—	—	
Ian Laperriere	Canada	RW	1993—1996	71	16	20	36	172	7	0	4	4	21	
Maxim Lapierre	Canada	C	2013—2015	116	11	13	24	94	6	1	1	2	4	
Guy Lapointe†	Canada	D	1981—1983	62	3	29	32	47	11	1	1	2	17	1993 HHoF
Rick Lapointe	Canada	D	1979—1982	231	16	64	80	338	14	2	3	5	24	
Claude Larose	Canada	RW	1974—1978	272	60	74	134	128	9	2	1	3	0	
Don Laurence	Canada	C	1979—1980	20	1	2	3	8	—	—	—	—	—	
Kevin LaVallee	Canada	LW	1984—1986	102	33	37	70	16	13	2	2	4	6	
Brian Lavender	Canada	LW	1971—1972	46	5	11	16	54	3	0	0	0	2	
Dominic Lavoie	Canada	D	1988—1992	26	2	4	6	28	—	—	—	—	—	
Steve Leach	United States	RW	1995—1997	31	4	5	9	46	17	3	2	5	43	
Nick Leddy	United States	D	2021—2025	211	9	55	64	42	16	1	5	6	4	
Gary Leeman	Canada	RW	1996—1997	2	0	1	1	0	—	—	—	—	—	
Jori Lehtera	Finland	C	2014—2017	218	30	70	100	120	33	4	11	15	14	
Josh Leivo	Canada	LW	2022—2023	51	4	12	16	25	—	—	—	—	—	
Alain Lemieux	Canada	C	1981—1984	81	17	33	50	24	4	0	1	1	0	
Jocelyn Lemieux	Canada	RW	1986—1988	76	11	8	19	136	10	0	1	1	21	
Jordan Leopold	United States	D	2012—2015	49	1	7	8	8	12	0	1	1	2	
Craig Levie	Canada	D	1984—1985	61	6	23	29	33	1	0	0	0	0	
Doug Lidster	Canada	D	1994—1995	37	2	7	9	12	4	0	0	0	2	
Petteri Lindbohm	Finland	D	2014—2017	40	2	1	3	37	—	—	—	—	—	
**Theo Lindstein***	Sweden	D	2025—2026	17	2	2	4	6	—	—	—	—	—	
Joakim Lindstrom	Sweden	C	2014—2015	34	3	3	6	8	—	—	—	—	—	
Jim Lorentz	Canada	C	1970—1972	88	19	22	41	46	6	0	1	1	4	
Reed Low	Canada	RW	2000—2004	250	3	16	19	294	—	—	—	—	—	
Dave Lowry	Canada	LW	1988—1993	311	53	51	104	432	52	5	11	16	108	
**Matt Luff***	Canada	RW	2025—2026	5	1	0	1	0	—	—	—	—	—	
Bernie Lukowich	Canada	RW	1974—1975	26	4	5	9	2	2	0	0	0	0	
MacKenzie MacEachern	United States	LW	2018—2024	123	11	9	20	55	5	0	0	0	6	
Shane MacEachern	Canada	C	1987—1988	1	0	0	0	0	—	—	—	—	—	
Al MacInnis†	Canada	D	1994—2004	613	127	325	452	551	82	14	44	58	102	2007 HHoF; 1999 James Norris Trophy; Captain, 2003–2004
David Mackey	Canada	LW	1991—1994	64	4	7	11	128	3	0	0	0	2	
Paul MacLean	Canada	RW	1980—1981; 1989—1991	116	40	44	84	124	13	4	3	7	20	
Bob MacMillan	Canada	RW	1975—1978	188	46	83	129	75	7	0	2	2	0	
Bernie MacNeil	Canada	LW	1973—1974	4	0	0	0	0	—	—	—	—	—	
Craig MacTavish	Canada	C	1995—1997	63	2	6	8	41	14	0	2	2	8	
Connie Madigan	Canada	D	1972—1973	20	0	3	3	25	5	0	0	0	4	
**Logan Mailloux***	Canada	D	2025—2026	67	5	8	13	48	—	—	—	—	—	
Wayne Maki	Canada	LW	1969—1970	16	2	1	3	4	—	—	—	—	—	
John Markell	Canada	LW	1983—1984	2	0	0	0	0	—	—	—	—	—	
Mario Marois	Canada	D	1990—1992	81	2	15	17	119	9	0	0	0	37	
Patrick Maroon†	United States	LW	2018—2019	74	10	18	28	64	26	3	4	7	8	SC 2019
Gilles Marotte	Canada	D	1976—1977	47	3	4	7	26	3	0	0	0	2	
Jason Marshall	Canada	D	1991—1992	2	1	0	1	4	—	—	—	—	—	
Steve Martins	Canada	C	2002—2004	53	4	3	7	40	3	0	1	1	0	
Jamie Masters	Canada	D	1975—1979	33	1	13	14	2	2	0	0	0	0	
Stephane Matteau	Canada	LW	1995—1997	120	23	33	56	115	16	0	2	2	8	
Bryan Maxwell	Canada	D	1979—1981	97	4	21	25	249	12	0	1	1	63	
Jamal Mayers	Canada	RW	1996—2008	595	71	87	158	756	48	5	8	13	20	
Chris McAlpine	United States	D	1996—2000	141	5	9	14	124	27	0	1	1	18	
Dean McAmmond	Canada	C	2005—2006	78	15	22	37	32	—	—	—	—	—	
Jay McClement	Canada	C	2005—2011	449	52	104	156	180	4	0	0	0	4	
Bob McCord	Canada	D	1972—1973	43	1	13	14	33	—	—	—	—	—	
Philip McRae	Canada	C	2010—2011	15	1	2	3	2	—	—	—	—	—	
Bill McCreary Sr.	Canada	LW	1967—1971	282	50	57	107	104	48	6	16	22	14	
Jim McCrimmon	Canada	D	1974—1975	2	0	0	0	0	—	—	—	—	—	
Ab McDonald	Canada	D	1968—1971	152	46	56	102	26	28	7	11		23	
Andy McDonald	Canada	LW/C	2007—2013	294	90	140	230	118	19	6	8	14	8	
**Hugh McGing***	United States	LW	2022—2026	9	1	1	2	0	—	—	—	—	—	
Jay McKee	Canada	D	2006—2010	158	3	14	17	98	4	0	0	0	4	
Tony McKegney	Canada	LW	1987—1989	151	65	55	120	140	12	3	7	10	8	
Don McKenney	Canada	C	1967—1968	39	9	20	29	4	6	1	1	2	2	
Steve McLaren	Canada	D	2003—2004	6	0	0	0	25	—	—	—	—	—	
Basil McRae	Canada	LW	1992—1996	112	3	11	14	313	22	2	2	4	40	
Gord McTavish	Canada	C	1978—1979	1	0	0	0	0	—	—	—	—	—	
Rick Meagher	Canada	C	1985—1991	413	73	88	161	264	62	8	7	15	41	1990 Frank J. Selke Trophy; Captain, 1989–1990
Wade Megan	United States	C	2016—2018	4	1	0	1	0	—	—	—	—	—	
Scott Mellanby	Canada	RW	2000—2004	235	62	75	137	370	35	10	8	18	41	
Gerry Melnyk	Canada	C	1967—1968	73	15	35	50	14	17	2	6	8	2	
Wayne Merrick	Canada	C	1972—1976	209	65	79	144	99	7	1	2	3	2	
Glen Metropolit	Canada	C	2006—2007	20	2	3	5	14	—	—	—	—	—	
Zbynek Michalek	Czech Republic	D	2014—2015	15	2	2	4	6	6	0	0	0	4	
Joe Micheletti	United States	D	1979—1982	137	9	54	63	110	11	1	11	12	10	
Kevin Miehm	Canada	C	1992—1994	22	1	4	5	8	2	0	1	1	0	
Niko Mikkola	Finland	D	2019—2023	139	4	16	20	101	16	0	2	2	10	
Kevin Miller	United States	C	1992—1995	162	49	52	101	148	13	1	3	4	15	
Tomas Mojzis	Czech Republic	D	2006—2007	6	1	0	1	0	—	—	—	—	—	
Sergio Momesso	Canada	LW	1988—1991; 1996—1997	222	44	70	114	506	25	5	7	12	93	
Hartland Monahan	Canada	RW	1979—1981	97	9	14	23	40	4	0	0	0	4	
Michel Mongeau	Canada	C	1989—1992	50	5	18	23	8	2	0	1	1	0	
Jim Montgomery	Canada	C	1993—1994	67	6	14	20	44	—	—	—	—	—	
Dickie Moore†	Canada	LW	1967—1968	27	5	3	8	9	18	7	7	14	15	1974 HHoF
George Morrison	Canada	LW	1970—1972	115	17	21	38	13	3	0	0	0	0	
Brenden Morrow	Canada	LW	2013—2014	71	13	12	25	76	2	0	0	0	0	
Joe Mullen†	United States	RW	1981—1986	301	151	184	335	45	20	9	11	20	4	2000 HHOF
Bob Murdoch	Canada	RW	1978—1979	54	13	13	26	17	—	—	—	—	—	
Joe Murphy	Canada	RW	1996—1998	102	24	34	58	91	6	1	1	2	10	
Mike Murphy	Canada	RW	1971—1973	127	38	50	88	67	11	2	3	5	6	
Andrew Murray	Canada	C	2012—2013	1	0	0	0	0	—	—	—	—	—	
Ladislav Nagy	Slovakia	LW	1999—2001	51	10	12	22	22	6	1	1	2	0	
Tyson Nash	Canada	LW	1998—2003	255	24	26	50	479	23	3	2	5	52	
Ric Nattress	Canada	D	1985—1987	151	10	42	52	76	24	1	4	5	26	
James Neal	Canada	LW	2021—2022	19	2	2	4	0	–	–	–	–	–	
Vaclav Nedomansky	Czechoslovakia	RW	1982—1983	22	2	9	11	2	—	—	—	—	—	
Petr Nedved	Czech Republic	C	1993—1994	19	6	14	20	8	4	0	1	1	4	
**Jake Neighbours***	Canada	LW	2021—2026	280	71	61	132	146	7	1	5	6	16	
Eric Nickulas	United States	RW	2002—2004	52	7	12	19	50	—	—	—	—	—	
Ville Nieminen	Finland	LW	2006—2007	14	0	0	0	29	—	—	—	—	—	
Nikita Nikitin	Russia	D	2010—2012	48	1	8	9	14	—	—	—	—	—	
Jim Nill	Canada	RW	1981—1982	61	9	12	21	127	—	—	—	—	—	
Jordan Nolan	Canada	C	2018—2019	14	0	2	2	14	—	—	—	—	—	
Brian Noonan	United States	RW	1995—1997	94	15	27	42	84	13	4	1	5	10	
Robert Nordmark	Sweden	D	1987—1988	67	3	18	21	60	—	—	—	—	—	
Joe Noris	United States	C	1972—1973	2	0	0	0	0	—	—	—	—	—	
Jeff Norton	United States	D	1994—1996	64	6	25	31	59	7	1	1	2	11	
Craig Norwich	United States	D	1980—1981	23	4	12	16	14	—	—	—	—	—	
Lee Norwood	United States	D	1985—1986; 1991—1993	147	11	42	53	291	20	2	8	10	64	
Ryan O'Reilly†	Canada	C	2018—2023	327	97	172	269	62	51	19	30	49	8	Captain, SC 2019, 2019 Conn Smythe Trophy Winner
Danny O'Shea	Canada	C	1971—1973	95	15	29	44	41	15	0	2	2	38	
Kevin O'Shea	Canada	RW	1971—1973	41	3	5	8	33	12	2	1	3	10	
Adam Oates†	Canada	C	1989—1992	195	58	288	286	71	25	9	25	34	14	2012 HHoF
Jaroslav Obsut	Slovakia	D	2000—2001	4	0	0	0	2	—	—	—	—	—	
Gerry Odrowski	Canada	D	1971—1972	55	1	2	3	8	11	0	0	0	8	
Brian Ogilvie	Canada	C	1974—1979	78	14	19	33	25	—	—	—	—	—	
Christer Olsson	Sweden	D	1995—1997	31	2	9	11	14	3	0	0	0	0	
Vladimir Orszagh	Slovakia	RW	2005—2006	16	4	5	9	14	—	—	—	—	—	
Keith Osborne	Canada	RW	1989—1990	5	0	2	2	8	—	—	—	—	—	
T. J. Oshie	United States	C	2008—2015	443	110	200	310	239	30	5	4	9	12	
Steve Ott	Canada	C	2013—2016	122	3	14	17	157	21	0	3	2	48	
Nathan Oystrick	Canada	D	2010—2011	9	1	2	3	9	—	—	—	—	—	
Magnus Paajarvi	Sweden	LW	2013—2018	189	19	20	39	34	11	1	3	4	2	
Cam Paddock	Canada	C	2008—2009	16	2	1	3	0	—	—	—	—	—	
Doug Palazzari	United States	C	1974—1979	108	18	20	38	23	2	0	0	0	0	
Justin Papineau	Canada	C	2001—2003	12	2	1	3	0	—	—	—	—	—	
**Colton Parayko***†	Canada	D	2015—2026	800	81	232	313	221	89	11	27	39	30	SC 2019
Michel Parizeau	Canada	C	1972—1973	21	1	2	3	8	—	—	—	—	—	
Greg Paslawski	Canada	RW	1983—1989	330	109	99	208	105	47	15	10	25	25	
Larry Patey	Canada	C	1975—1984	603	123	136	259	524	35	8	9	17	51	
Craig Patrick†	United States	RW	1974—1975	43	6	9	15	6	2	0	1	1	0	2001 HHoF
Glenn Patrick	United States	D	1973—1974	1	0	0	0	2	—	—	—	—	—	
Jim Pavese	United States	D	1981—1988	263	10	34	44	485	31	0	5	5	66	
Rob Pearson	Canada	RW	1995—1997	45	7	6	13	91	2	0	0	0	14	
Matthew Peca	Canada	C	2021—2022	5	0	1	1	0	–	–	–	–	–	
Scott Pellerin	Canada	LW	1996—2000; 2003—2004	296	44	67	111	189	31	1	2	3	22	
Mike Peluso	United States	LW	1996—1997	44	2	3	5	158	5	0	0	0	25	
Joel Perrault	Canada	C	2006—2007	11	0	0	0	0	—	—	—	—	—	
David Perron†	Canada	LW	2007—2013; 2016—2017; 2018—2022	673	196	269	465	454	77	22	26	48	62	SC 2019
Scott Perunovich	United States	D	2021—2025	97	2	27	29	26	7	0	4	4	0	
Ricard Persson	Sweden	D	1996—2000	149	5	28	33	177	22	1	4	5	44	
Robert Petrovicky	Slovakia	C	1996—1997	44	7	12	19	10	2	0	0	0	0	
Jorgen Pettersson	Sweden	LW	1980—1985	365	161	171	332	105	36	14	10	24	2	
Michel Picard	Canada	LW	1997—1999	61	12	19	31	45	5	0	0	0	2	
Noel Picard	Canada	D	1967—1973	278	12	46	58	540	47	2	10	12	167	
Roger Picard	Canada	RW	1967—1968	15	2	2	4	21	—	—	—	—	—	
Dave Pichette	United States	D	1983—1984	23	0	11	11	6	9	1	2	3	18	
Alex Pietrangelo†	Canada	D	2008—2020	758	109	341	450	241	92	8	43	51	44	Captain, 2016–Present, SC 2019
Rich Pilon	Canada	D	2001—2002	8	0	2	2	9	—	—	—	—	—	
Tyler Pitlick	United States	C	2022—2023	61	7	9	16	14	—	—	—	—	—	
Barclay Plager	Canada	D	1967—1977	614	44	187	231	1,115	68	3	20	23	182	Captain 1972–1976
Bill Plager	Canada	D	1968—1972	127	2	18	20	141	19	0	2	2	18	
Bob Plager	Canada	D	1967—1978	615	20	121	141	762	74	2	17	19	195	
Pierre Plante	Canada	RW	1972—1977	357	104	112	216	420	14	2	0	2	31	
Adrien Plavsic	Canada	D	1989—1990	4	0	1	1	2	—	—	—	—	—	
Steve Poapst	Canada	D	2005—2006	41	0	1	1	37	—	—	—	—	—	
Shjon Podein	United States	LW	2001—2003	91	6	10	16	30	17	0	1	1	12	
Rudy Poeschek	Canada	D	1997—2000	78	1	7	8	121	2	0	0	0	6	
Austin Poganski	United States	RW	2019—2021	6	0	0	0	0	—	—	—	—	—	
John Pohl	United States	C	2003—2004	1	0	0	0	0	—	—	—	—	—	
Roman Polak	Czech Republic	D	2006—2014	424	13	66	79	319	25	0	2	2	25	
Greg Polis	Canada	LW	1973—1974	37	8	12	20	24	—	—	—	—	—	
Jame Pollock	Canada	D	2003—2004	9	0	0	0	6	—	—	—	—	—	
Chris Porter	Canada	C	2008—2015	173	11	16	27	33	15	2	3	5	0	
Mike Posavad	Canada	D	1985—1987	8	0	0	0	0	—	—	—	—	—	
Derrick Pouliot	Canada	D	2019—2020	2	0	0	0	2	—	—	—	—	—	
Vitali Prokhorov	Russia	LW	1992—1995	83	19	11	30	35	4	0	0	0	0	
Chris Pronger†	Canada	D	1995—2004	598	84	272	356	931	85	10	41	51	210	2015 HHoF; 2000 Hart Memorial Trophy; 2000 James Norris Memorial Trophy; Captain, 1997–2003
Nate Prosser	United States	D	2017—2018	1	0	0	0	0	—	—	—	—	—	
Dan Quinn	Canada	C	1990—1991	14	4	7	11	20	13	4	7	11	32	
Stephane Quintal	Canada	D	1991—1993	101	1	16	17	132	13	1	2	3	14	
Herb Raglan	Canada	RW	1985—1991	235	26	39	65	571	32	3	6	9	50	
Rob Ramage	Canada	D	1982—1988	441	67	229	296	898	43	5	27	32	147	
Ty Rattie	Canada	RW	2013—2017	30	4	4	8	6	—	—	—	—	—	
Marty Reasoner	United States	C	1998—2001	95	17	30	47	42	17	5	2	7	4	
Ryan Reaves	Canada	RW	2010—2017	419	27	24	51	695	36	1	0	1	23	
Wade Redden	Canada	D	2012—2013	23	2	3	5	11	—	—	—	—	—	
Dick Redmond	Canada	D	1977—1978	28	4	11	15	16	—	—	—	—	—	
Mark Reeds	Canada	RW	1981—1987	320	45	105	150	98	53	8	9	17	23	
Steve Regier	Canada	LW	2008—2009	8	3	1	4	4	—	—	—	—	—	
Mitch Reinke	United States	D	2017—2018	1	0	0	0	0	—	—	—	—	—	
Todd Reirden	United States	D	1999—2001	94	6	25	31	75	5	0	1	1	0	
Pascal Rheaume	Canada	C	1997—2001	148	19	31	50	74	21	2	4	6	14	
Ken Richardson	Canada	C	1974—1979	49	8	13	21	—	—	—	—	—		
Stephane Richer	Canada	RW	1999—2000	36	8	17	25	14	3	1	0	1	0	
Dave Richter	Canada	D	1988—1990	68	1	5	6	99	—	—	—	—	—	
Jamie Rivers	Canada	D	1995—1999; 2006—2007	184	7	17	24	127	9	1	1	2	2	
Wayne Rivers	Canada	RW	1967—1968	22	4	4	8	8	—	—	—	—	—	
Andy Roach	United States	D	2005—2006	5	1	2	3	10	—	—	—	—	—	
Phil Roberto	Canada	RW	1971—1975	148	33	38	71	187	16	9	7	16	33	
David Roberts	United States	LW	1993—1996	48	7	11	18	24	9	0	0	0	16	
Gordie Roberts	United States	D	1987—1991	166	6	42	48	263	30	2	11	13	67	
Jim Roberts	Canada	D/RW	1967—1972; 1977—1978	395	63	94	157	318	52	9	9	18	70	Captain, 1971–1972
Rob Robinson	Canada	D	1991—1992	22	0	1	1	8	—	—	—	—	—	
Cliff Ronning	Canada	C	1986—1991	180	54	71	125	46	16	2	5	7	2	
Bill Root	Canada	D	1987—1988	9	0	0	0	6	—	—	—	—	—	
Calle Rosen	Sweden	D	2021—2024	73	10	16	26	14	9	0	0	0	2	
Derek Roy	Canada	C	2013—2014	75	9	28	37	30	4	0	1	1	0	
Martin Rucinsky	Czech Republic	LW	2002—2003; 2006—2008	153	33	46	79	126	7	4	2	6	4	
Jason Ruff	Canada	LW	1992—1993	7	2	1	3	8	—	—	—	—	—	
Darren Rumble	Canada	D	2000—2001	12	0	4	4	27	—	—	—	—	—	
Kris Russell	Canada	D	2011—2013	76	5	11	16	21	9	0	3	3	5	
Mark Rycroft	Canada	RW	2001—2006	160	15	19	34	82	3	0	0	0	2	
Brandon Saad	United States	LW	2021—2025	274	76	68	144	48	12	2	3	5	4	
Gary Sabourin	Canada	RW	1967—1974	463	136	131	267	334	62	19	11	30	58	
Larry Sacharuk	Canada	D	1974—1975	76	20	22	42	24	2	1	1	2	2	
Bryce Salvador	Canada	D	2000—2008	447	16	47	63	413	36	2	1	3	26	
Dmitri Samorukov	Russia	D	2022—2023	2	0	0	0	2	—	—	—	—	—	
Derek Sanderson	Canada	C	1975—1977	97	32	56	88	85	3	1	0	1	0	
Zach Sanford†	United States	LW	2016—2021	183	36	35	71	78	25	2	6	8	17f	SC 2019
Steven Santini	United States	D	2020—2023	7	0	2	2	2	2	0	0	0	0	
Glen Sather†	Canada	LW	1973—1974	69	15	29	44	82	—	—	—	—	—	1997 HHoF
Brian Savage	Canada	LW	2003—2004	13	4	3	7	2	5	1	1	2	0	
Kevin Sawyer	Canada	LW	1995—1996	6	0	0	0	23	—	—	—	—	—	
Marco Scandella	Canada	D	2019—2024	215	9	25	34	67	17	0	0	0	0	
Dave Scatchard	Canada	C	2010—2011	8	0	1	1	6	—	—	—	—	—	
**Brayden Schenn***†	Canada	C	2017—2026	650	181	284	465	424	58	10	19	29	73	SC 2019
Corey Scheuneman	United States	D	2024—2025	4	0	0	0	0	–	–	–	–	–	
Jordan Schmaltz	United States	D	2016—2019	42	0	5	5	12	1	0	0	0	0	
Ron Schock	Canada	C	1967—1969	122	21	36	57	31	24	2	4	6	6	
Dwight Schofield	United States	D	1983—1985	113	5	14	19	403	6	0	0	0	41	
Jaden Schwartz†	Canada	C	2011—2021	560	154	231	385	153	88	26	28	54	16	SC 2019
Rod Seiling	Canada	D	1976—1979	160	4	38	42	80	4	0	0	0	2	
Peter Sejna	Slovakia	LW	2002—2007	49	7	4	11	12	—	—	—	—	—	
Brit Selby	Canada	LW	1970—1972	62	1	4	5	23	1	0	0	0	0	
Konstantin Shafronov	Russia	RW	1996—1997	5	2	1	3	0	—	—	—	—	—	
Brendan Shanahan†	Canada	LW	1991—1995	277	156	150	306	692	26	12	16	28	50	2013 HHoF
Kevin Shattenkirk	United States	D	2011—2017	425	59	199	258	274	47	4	24	28	35	
Brad Shaw	Canada	D	1998—1999	12	0	0	0	4	—	—	—	—	—	
Rick Shinske	Canada	C	1978—1979	11	0	4	4	2	—	—	—	—	—	
Jim Shires	Canada	LW	1971—1972	18	0	3	3	8	—	—	—	—	—	
Timofei Shishkanov	Russia	LW	2005—2006	22	3	2	5	6	—	—	—	—	—	
Mike Sillinger	Canada	C	2003—2006	64	27	24	51	63	5	3	1	4	6	
Bobby Simpson	Canada	LW	1979—1980	18	2	2	4	0	—	—	—	—	—	
Reid Simpson	Canada	LW	2000—2001	38	2	1	3	96	—	—	—	—	—	
Randy Skarda	United States	D	1989—1992	26	0	5	5	11	—	—	—	—	—	
**Hunter Skinner***	United States	D	2025—2026	1	0	0	0	0	—	—	—	—	—	
Rick Smith	Canada	D	1975—1977	42	1	8	9	24	3	0	1	1	4	
Peter Smrek	Slovakia	LW	2002—2003	153	33	46	79	126	7	4	2	6	4	
John Smrke	Canada	LW	1977—1979	73	8	12	20	31	—	—	—	—	—	
Harold Snepsts	Canada	D	1989—1991	61	1	5	6	60	19	0	3	3	50	
**Jimmy Snuggerud***	United States	RW	2024—2026	77	22	33	55	18	7	2	2	4	0	
Vladimir Sobotka	Czech Republic	C	2010—2014; 2016—2018	329	41	92	133	268	32	3	11	14	17	
Nikita Soshnikov	Russia	RW	2017—2019	17	1	1	2	4	—	—	—	—	—	
Frank Spring	Canada	RW	1973—1975	5	0	0	0	0	—	—	—	—	—	
Frank St. Marseille	Canada	RW	1967—1973	403	86	171	257	118	62	19	24	43	16	
Myron Stankiewicz	Canada	LW	1968—1969	16	0	2	2	11	—	—	—	—	—	
Paul Stastny	United States	C	2014—2018	267	56	119	175	116	33	6	11	17	22	
Peter Stastny†	Slovakia	C	1993—1995	23	6	12	18	4	4	0	0	0	2	1998 HHoF
Yan Stastny	United States	C	2007—2010	50	5	5	10	29	—	—	—	—	—	
Alexander Steen†	Sweden	LW	2008—2020	765	195	301	496	348	91	15	21	36	62	SC 2019
Lee Stempniak	United States	RW	2005—2009	233	57	73	130	97	—	—	—	—	—	
**Otto Stenberg***	Sweden	C	2025—2026	32	3	7	10	5	—	—	—	—	—	
Brett Sterling	United States	LW	2011—2012	4	0	0	0	0	—	—	—	—	—	
Scott Stevens†	Canada	D	1990—1991	78	5	44	49	150	133	0	3	3	36	2007 HHoF; Captain, 1990–1991
Bill Stewart	Canada	D	1980—1983	89	2	26	28	147	4	1	0	1	11	
Bob Stewart	Canada	D	1978—1980	88	5	14	19	51	—	—	—	—	—	
Chris Stewart	Canada	RW	2010—2014	211	63	52	115	276	13	2	1	3	12	
Ron Stewart	Canada	RW	1967—1968	19	7	5	12	11	—	—	—	—	—	
Cory Stillman	Canada	LW	2000—2003	171	50	69	119	98	30	5	9	14	12	
Tyson Strachan	Canada	D	2008—2011	67	0	6	6	82	—	—	—	—	—	
Mike Stuart	United States	D	2003—2006	3	0	0	0	0	—	—	—	—	—	
Bob Stumpf	Canada	D	1974—1975	7	1	1	2	16	—	—	—	—	—	
**Oskar Sundqvist***†	Sweden	C	2017—2022; 2023—2026	432	52	89	141	180	41	5	7	12	16	SC 2019
**Pius Suter***	Switzerland	F	2025—2026	64	13	16	29	20	—	—	—	—	—	
Ryan Suter	United States	D	2024—2025	82	2	13	15	24	5	0	1	1	0	
Bill Sutherland	Canada	C	1970—1972	77	21	23	44	43	1	0	0	0	0	
Brian Sutter	Canada	LW	1976—1988	779	303	333	636	1,786	65	21	21	42	249	Captain, 1979–1988
Rich Sutter	Canada	RW	1989—1993	250	40	41	81	351	42	6	3	9	73	
Ron Sutter	Canada	RW	1991—1994	163	37	54	91	236	6	1	3	4	8	
Ken Sutton	Canada	D	1995—1996	6	0	0	0	4	1	0	0	0	0	
Darryl Sydor	Canada	D	2009—2010	47	0	8	8	15	—	—	—	—	—	
Jean-Guy Talbot	Canada	D	1967—1971	172	7	23	30	72	45	1	10	11	30	
Vladimir Tarasenko†	Russia	RW	2013—2023	644	262	291	553	185	90	41	19	60	6	SC 2019
Patrice Tardif	Canada	C	1994—1996	50	6	10	16	41	—	—	—	—	—	
**Alexandre Texier***	France	C	2024—2026	39	6	6	12	12	3	0	1	1	0	
**Robert Thomas***†	Canada	C	2018—2026	530	132	328	460	172	52	6	20	26	28	SC 2019
Dave Thomlinson	Canada	LW	1989—1991	22	1	2	3	12	9	3	1	4	4	
Tage Thompson	United States	C	2017—2018	41	3	6	9	12	—	—	—	—	—	
Floyd Thomson	Canada	LW	1971—1980	411	56	97	153	341	10	0	2	2	6	
Chris Thorburn	Canada	RW	2017—2019	51	1	6	7	60	—	—	—	—	—	
Esa Tikkanen	Finland	LW	1994—1996	54	13	27	40	40	7	2	2	4	20	
Tom Tilley	Canada	D	1988—1994	174	4	38	42	89	14	1	3	4	19	
Keith Tkachuk†	United States	LW	2000—2010	543	208	219	427	677	45	9	19	28	76	2026 HHoF
**Alexey Toropchenko***	Russia	RW	2021—2026	324	34	37	71	110	19	2	4	6	12	
Larry Trader	Canada	D	1986—1988	6	0	0	0	10	—	—	—	—	—	
Dan Trebil	United States	D	2000—2001	10	0	0	0	0	—	—	—	—	—	
**Tyler Tucker***	Canada	D	2022—2026	159	8	22	30	209	3	1	0	1	4	
Rob Tudor	Canada	C	1982—1983	2	0	0	0	0	—	—	—	—	—	
Darren Turcotte	United States	C	1997—1998	62	12	6	18	26	10	0	0	0	2	
Pierre Turgeon	Canada	C	1996—2001	327	134	221	355	117	50	14	31	45	12	
Perry Turnbull	Canada	C	1979—1984; 1987—1988	396	139	99	238	829	13	5	3	8	29	
Steve Tuttle	Canada	RW	1988—1991	144	28	28	56	12	17	1	6	7	2	
Tony Twist	Canada	LW	1989—1990; 1994—1999	294	10	11	21	688	18	1	1	2	22	
Garry Unger	Canada	C	1970—1979	662	292	283	575	744	31	11	14	25	72	Captain, 1976–1977
Scottie Upshall	Canada	LW	2015—2018	206	23	28	51	135	28	1	2	3	18	
Mike Van Ryn	Canada	D	2000—2003	69	2	11	13	26	9	0	0	0	0	
Sergei Varlamov	Ukraine	LW	2001—2003	55	5	7	12	26	1	0	0	0	2	
Alexander Vasilevski	Ukraine	RW	1995—1997	4	0	0	0	2	—	—	—	—	—	
Gary Veneruzzo	Canada	LW	1967—1972	7	1	1	2	0	—	—	—	—	—	
Jim Vesey	United States	C	1988—1990	11	1	2	3	7	—	—	—	—	—	
Alain Vigneault	Canada	D	1981—1983	42	2	5	7	82	4	0	1	1	26	
Roman Vopat	Czech Republic	C	1995—1996	25	2	3	5	48	—	—	—	—	—	
Jakub Vrana	Czech Republic	LW	2022—2024	41	12	8	20	18	—	—	—	—	—	
Steve Wagner	United States	D	2007—2009	46	4	8	12	26	—	—	—	—	—	
Matt Walker	Canada	D	2002—2008	175	1	10	11	275	4	0	0	0	0	
**Nathan Walker***	Australia	C	2019—2026	263	31	34	65	142	11	3	1	4	24	
Jake Walman	Canada	D	2019—2022	57	4	4	8	14	1	0	0	0	0	
Mike Walton	Canada	C	1978—1979	22	7	11	18	6	—	—	—	—	—	
Bryan Watson	Canada	D	1973—1974	11	0	1	1	19	—	—	—	—	—	
Mike Weaver	Canada	D	2008—2010	135	1	16	17	41	4	0	0	0	0	
Doug Weight	United States	C	2001—2006; 2006—2008	364	75	220	295	247	22	8	10	18	12	
Eric Weinrich	United States	D	2003—2006	85	3	24	27	58	5	0	1	1	0	
Jay Wells	Canada	D	1995—1996	76	0	3	3	67	12	0	1	1	2	
Jeremy Welsh	Canada	C	2015—2016	2	0	0	0	2	—	—	—	—	—	
John Wensink	Canada	LW	1973—1974	3	0	0	0	0	—	—	—	—	—	
Don Wheldon	United States	D	1974—1975	2	0	0	0	0	—	—	—	—	—	
Rob Whistle	Canada	D	1987—1988	19	3	3	6	6	1	0	0	0	0	
Trent Whitfield	Canada	C	2005—2006; 2008—2009	33	2	6	8	14	—	—	—	—	—	
Doug Wickenheiser	Canada	C	1983—1987	230	51	67	118	108	36	4	7	11	16	
Dennis Wideman	Canada	D	2005—2007	122	13	33	46	127	—	—	—	—	—	
Warren "Butch" Williams	United States	RW	1973—1974	31	3	10	13	6	—	—	—	—	—	
Bert Wilson	Canada	LW	1975—1976	45	2	3	5	47	—	—	—	—	—	
Rick Wilson	Canada	D	1974—1976	141	3	11	14	103	3	0	0	0	0	
Rik Wilson	United States	D	1981—1986	235	21	60	81	214	22	0	4	4	23	
Ron Wilson	Canada	C	1989—1993	248	33	72	105	167	36	3	6	9	58	
Brad Winchester	United States	LW	2008—2011	185	25	18	43	283	4	0	0	0	10	
Jeff Woywitka	Canada	D	2005—2009	152	6	29	35	106	4	0	0	0	0	
Andy Wozniewski	United States	D	2008—2009	1	0	0	0	0	—	—	—	—	—	
John Wright	Canada	C	1973—1974	32	3	6	9	22	—	—	—	—	—	
Jeremy Yablonski	Canada	LW	2003—2004	1	0	0	0	5	—	—	—	—	—	
Terry Yake	Canada	C	1997—2000	151	23	42	65	94	23	3	3	6	20	
Nail Yakupov	Russia	RW	2016—2017	40	3	6	9	14	5	0	1	1	2	
Trent Yawney	Canada	D	1996—1997	39	0	2	2	17	—	—	—	—	—	
Harry York	Canada	C	1996—1998	132	18	24	42	55	5	0	0	0	2	
Scott Young	United States	RW	1998—2002; 2005—2006	377	125	129	254	153	44	19	16	35	22	
Libor Zabransky	Czech Republic	D	1996—1998	40	1	6	7	50	—	—	—	—	—	
Joe Zanussi	Canada	D	1976—1977	11	0	3	3	4	—	—	—	—	—	
Peter Zezel	Canada	C	1988—1990; 1995—1997	217	54	105	159	81	32	10	13	23	10	
Michael Zigomanis	Canada	C	2005—2006	2	0	0	0	2	—	—	—	—	—	
Rick Zombo	United States	D	1991—1995	232	6	42	48	233	24	0	3	3	37	
Mike Zuke	Canada	C	1978—1983	296	76	159	235	160	26	6	6	12	12	
