= Rob Whistle =

Canadian ice hockey player

- Born: April 30, 1961 (age 63); Thunder Bay, Ontario, Canada
- Height: 6 ft 2 in (188 cm)
- Weight: 195 lb (88 kg; 13 st 13 lb)
- Position: Defence
- Shot: Right
- Played for: New York Rangers; St. Louis Blues
- NHL draft: Undrafted
- Playing career: 1985–1989

Robert Douglas Whistle (born April 30, 1961) is a Canadian former professional ice hockey defenceman who played for the New York Rangers and St. Louis Blues of the National Hockey League (NHL).

== Playing career ==
Whistle was signed as a free agent by the New York Rangers on August 13, 1985. He played 32 games for the Rangers before getting traded to St. Louis for Tony McKegney and Bruce Bell. After playing 19 games for the Blues, he was traded to the Washington Capitals. However, he played for their farm club the whole season, and he retired at the end of that season.

== Career statistics ==
			Regular season					Playoffs
Season	Team	League	GP	G	A	Pts	PIM	GP	G	A	Pts	PIM
1976–77	Thunder Bay Flyers	TBJHL	28	10	21	31	—	—	—	—	—	—
1977–78	Thunder Bay Flyers	TBJHL	28	28	30	58	—	—	—	—	—	—
1978–79	Thunder Bay Flyers	TBJHL	18	10	12	22	22	—	—	—	—	—
1979–80	Kitchener Rangers	OMJHL	55	2	5	7	68	—	—	—	—	—
1980–81	Kitchener Rangers	OHL	33	4	0	4	47	—	—	—	—	—
1982–83	Wilfrid Laurier University	CIAU	24	6	14	20	12	—	—	—	—	—
1983–84	Wilfrid Laurier University	CIAU	24	9	15	24	42	—	—	—	—	—
1984–85	Wilfrid Laurier University	CIAU	24	5	22	27	31	—	—	—	—	—
1985–86	New York Rangers	NHL	32	4	2	6	10	3	0	0	0	2
1985–86	New Haven Nighthawks	AHL	20	1	4	5	5	—	—	—	—	—
1986–87	New Haven Nighthawks	AHL	55	4	12	16	30	7	1	1	2	7
1987–88	St. Louis Blues	NHL	19	3	3	6	6	1	0	0	0	0
1987–88	Peoria Rivermen	IHL	39	5	21	26	21	—	—	—	—	—
1988–89	Baltimore Skipjacks	AHL	61	2	24	26	30	—	—	—	—	—
1988–89	Peoria Rivermen	IHL	4	0	1	1	4	—	—	—	—	—
NHL totals			51	7	5	12	16	4	0	0	0	2
AHL totals			136	7	40	47	65	7	1	1	2	7

== See also ==
- List of New York Rangers players
- List of St. Louis Blues players
