= Garry Unger =

Canadian ice hockey player

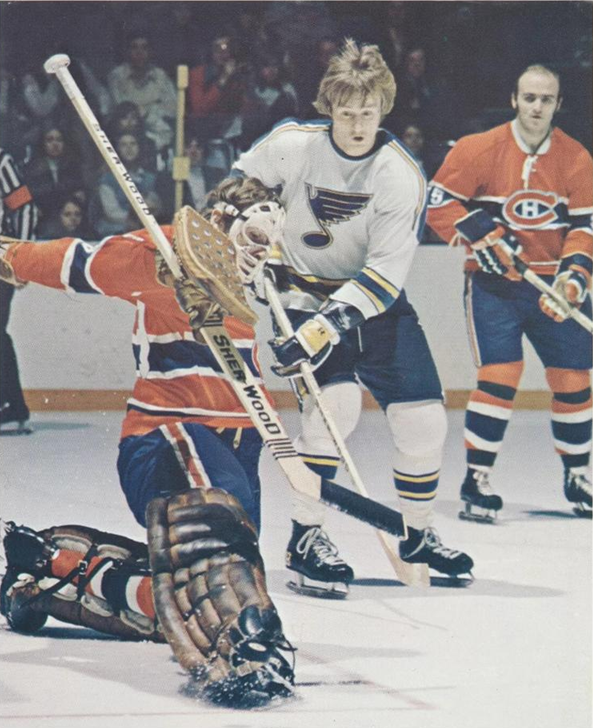
- Born: December 7, 1947 (age 78) Calgary, Alberta, Canada
- Height: 5 ft 11 in (180 cm)
- Weight: 170 lb (77 kg; 12 st 2 lb)
- Position: Centre
- Shot: Left
- Played for: AHL; Rochester Americans; Moncton Alpines; NHL; Toronto Maple Leafs; Detroit Red Wings; St. Louis Blues; Atlanta Flames; Los Angeles Kings; Edmonton Oilers
- National team: Canada
- Playing career: 1967–1988
Medal record
Representing Canada
World Championships
Bronze medal – third place	1978 Czechoslovakia

Garry Douglas Unger (born December 7, 1947) is a Canadian former professional ice hockey centre who played 16 seasons in the National Hockey League (NHL) from 1967 until 1983.

== Early life ==
Unger was born on December 7, 1947, Calgary, Alberta, Canada, to parents Olive and Jack. His younger sister, Carol Ann, contracted polio as a baby and became permanently disabled.

== Playing career ==
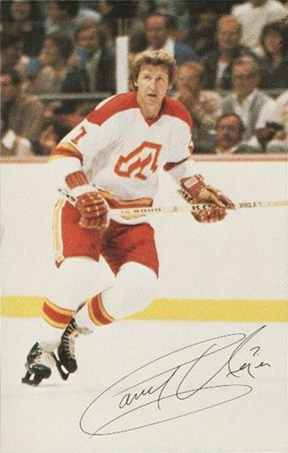
Garry Unger in 1979-80 card for Atlanta Flames

Unger set an NHL record by playing 914 consecutive games in the regular season between February 24, 1968, and December 21, 1979, doing so with four teams: the Toronto Maple Leafs, Detroit Red Wings, St. Louis Blues and Atlanta Flames. Unger passed Andy Hebenton, who had the record of 630 consecutive games played that had stood since the 1963-64 NHL season. Unger's streak came to an end after team coach Al MacNeil benched him on December 21, 1979. (Note: His record was surpassed by Phil Kessel in 2022.)

He was part of a six-player blockbuster transaction in which he was traded along with Frank Mahovlich and Pete Stemkowski to the Detroit Red Wings in exchange for Norm Ullman, Paul Henderson and Floyd Smith on March 4, 1968.

Unger finished his career with 1105 career NHL games, scoring 413 goals and 391 assists for 804 points, and he also registered 1075 career penalty minutes. Unger was the MVP of the 1974 NHL All-Star Game, played in Chicago. He had an assist and scored a shorthanded goal in the West Division's 6–4 victory over the East Division.

After retiring from the NHL Unger played for three seasons in the British professional league. The first season was with Tom Stewarts Dundee Rockets in 1985. During that season with the Rockets Garry played 41 games and scored 93 goals and made 54 assists. He then moved to newly relegated Peterborough Pirates and helped to get them promoted at the first time of asking, playing in 30 games that saw him score 95 goals and record over 100 assists on the way to over 200 points.

== Personal life ==
Unger became a devout Christian following the death of teammate Bob Gassoff. He also credited his Flames teammates for helping him "on the right path spiritually." Unger and his wife have three children together.

== Career statistics ==
=== Regular season and playoffs ===
			Regular season					Playoffs
Season	Team	League	GP	G	A	Pts	PIM	GP	G	A	Pts	PIM
1965–66	Calgary Buffaloes	AJHL	—	—	—	—	—	—	—	—	—	—
1966–67	London Nationals	OHA	48	38	35	73	60	6	2	5	7	27
1966–67	Rochester Americans	AHL	1	0	0	0	0	1	0	0	0	0
1966–67	Tulsa Oilers	CPHL	2	2	0	2	2	—	—	—	—	—
1967–68	London Nationals	OHA	2	4	1	5	2	—	—	—	—	—
1967–68	Toronto Maple Leafs	NHL	15	1	1	2	4	—	—	—	—	—
1967–68	Tulsa Oilers	CHL	9	3	5	8	6	—	—	—	—	—
1967–68	Rochester Americans	AHL	5	1	3	4	6	—	—	—	—	—
1967–68	Detroit Red Wings	NHL	13	5	10	15	2	—	—	—	—	—
1968–69	Detroit Red Wings	NHL	76	24	20	44	33	—	—	—	—	—
1969–70	Detroit Red Wings	NHL	76	42	24	66	67	4	0	1	1	6
1970–71	Detroit Red Wings	NHL	51	13	14	27	63	—	—	—	—	—
1970–71	St. Louis Blues	NHL	28	15	14	29	41	6	3	2	5	20
1971–72	St. Louis Blues	NHL	78	36	34	70	104	11	4	5	9	35
1972–73	St. Louis Blues	NHL	78	41	39	80	119	5	1	2	3	2
1973–74	St. Louis Blues	NHL	78	33	35	68	96	—	—	—	—	—
1974–75	St. Louis Blues	NHL	80	36	44	80	123	2	1	3	4	6
1975–76	St. Louis Blues	NHL	80	39	44	83	95	3	2	1	3	7
1976–77	St. Louis Blues	NHL	80	30	27	57	56	4	0	1	1	2
1977–78	St. Louis Blues	NHL	80	32	20	52	66	—	—	—	—	—
1978–79	St. Louis Blues	NHL	80	30	26	56	44	—	—	—	—	—
1979–80	Atlanta Flames	NHL	79	17	16	33	39	4	0	3	3	2
1980–81	Los Angeles Kings	NHL	58	10	10	20	40	—	—	—	—	—
1980–81	Edmonton Oilers	NHL	13	0	0	0	6	8	0	0	0	2
1981–82	Edmonton Oilers	NHL	46	7	13	20	69	4	1	0	1	23
1982–83	Edmonton Oilers	NHL	16	2	0	2	8	1	0	0	0	0
1982–83	Moncton Alpines	AHL	8	2	3	5	0	—	—	—	—	—
1985–86	Dundee Rockets	BHL	35	86	48	134	64	6	7	6	13	44
1986–87	Peterborough Pirates	BHL-2	30	95	143	238	58	8	17	15	32	38
1987–88	Peterborough Pirates	BHL	32	37	44	81	116	—	—	—	—	—
NHL totals			1,105	413	391	804	1,075	52	12	18	30	105

=== International ===
Year	Team	Event	GP	G	A	Pts	PIM
1978	Canada	WC	10	0	0	0	30
1979	Canada	WC	7	2	1	3	12
Senior totals			17	2	1	3	42

== See also ==
- List of NHL players with 1,000 games played

== Notes ==
Preceded by Red Berenson	St. Louis Blues captain 1976–77	Succeeded by Red Berenson
