= Bob Gassoff =

Canadian ice hockey player (1953–1977)

- Born: April 17, 1953 Quesnel, British Columbia, Canada
- Died: May 29, 1977 (aged 24) near Gray Summit, Missouri, U.S.
- Height: 5 ft 10 in (178 cm)
- Weight: 190 lb (86 kg; 13 st 8 lb)
- Position: Defence
- Shot: Left
- Played for: St. Louis Blues
- NHL draft: 48th overall, 1973; St. Louis Blues
- WHA draft: 33rd overall, 1973; Minnesota Fighting Saints
- Playing career: 1973–1977

Robert Allen Gassoff (April 17, 1953 – May 29, 1977) was a professional ice hockey player, born in Quesnel, British Columbia. From an early age he was passionate about hockey, playing first on a rink on the family farm on the Quesnel Hydraulic Road and then on a variety of local junior leagues. He played four seasons in the NHL for the St. Louis Blues. He was killed in a motorcycle accident on the country property of his friend and teammate Garry Unger near Gray Summit, Missouri. His number three sweater was subsequently retired by the Blues.

== Motorcycle accident ==
Gassoff was killed in a motorcycle accident on the Sunday of Memorial Day weekend in 1977. He and his pregnant wife, Diane, had been invited to a postseason barbecue at teammate Garry Unger's 200-acre (0.81 km^{2}) farm near Gray Summit, Mo. At roughly 6:00 p.m., Gassoff joined several others in riding motorcycles around Unger's property. Unger later said that he remembered wondering if it was a good idea for Gassoff to ride the motorcycle because he had been drinking and did not have any riding experience. Gassoff drove out of Unger's property on a gravel road that merged into a winding road leading up a hill to Villa Ridge, Missouri. Gassoff was not wearing a helmet and had no license plate on his motorcycle and decided to take a short run up the hill and come right back. On his way back down the hill, he collided head-on with a car driven by a man named Douglas Klekamp. The crash killed Gassoff, and Klekamp walked away uninjured. In October 1977, Gassoff's widow filed a $3 million lawsuit against Unger, his wife, and Klekamp, whom the suit alleged was one of Unger's employees running an errand for the Ungers. Unger describes Gassoff's death as one of the most devastating moments of his life.

== Family ==
Gassoff's parents, Albert and Denise, encouraged his interest in hockey from a very early age. Gassoff's brother, Brad, also played in the NHL. His brother Ken, born October 9, 1954, was drafted by the New York Rangers in the 1974 NHL amateur draft and by the Houston Aeros in the 1974 WHA Amateur Draft. Gassoff's son Bob Gassoff Jr. (born two months after the fatal motorcycle accident in 1977) eventually also became a hockey player, briefly playing minor league professional hockey for the Peoria Rivermen (ECHL) after a four-year college hockey career with the university of Michigan Wolverines men's ice hockey team. He became a Navy SEAL after retiring from hockey.

== Tributes ==
Following his death, the Bob Gassoff Trophy was created to be presented annually to the most improved defenseman in the Central Hockey League (CHL).

== Career statistics ==
=== Regular season and playoffs ===
			Regular season					Playoffs
Season	Team	League	GP	G	A	Pts	PIM	GP	G	A	Pts	PIM
1970–71	Vernon Lakers	BCJHL	—	—	—	—	—	—	—	—	—	—
1971–72	Medicine Hat Tigers	WHL	64	1	16	17	314	7	0	2	2	29
1972–73	Medicine Hat Tigers	WHL	68	11	51	62	388	17	2	10	12	152
1973–74	St. Louis Blues	NHL	28	0	3	3	84	—	—	—	—	—
1973–74	Denver Spurs	WHL	45	4	10	14	301	—	—	—	—	—
1974–75	St. Louis Blues	NHL	60	4	14	18	222	2	0	0	0	0
1974–75	Denver Spurs	CHL	19	2	11	13	114	—	—	—	—	—
1975–76	St. Louis Blues	NHL	80	1	12	13	306	3	0	0	0	6
1976–77	St. Louis Blues	NHL	77	6	18	24	254	4	0	1	1	10
NHL totals			245	11	47	58	866	9	0	1	1	16

== See also ==
- List of ice hockey players who died during their playing career
