= Theater in the United States =

Theater in the United States is part of the old European theatrical tradition and has been heavily influenced by the British theater. The central hub of the American theater scene is Manhattan, with its divisions of Broadway, Off-Broadway, and Off-Off-Broadway. Many movie and television stars have gotten their big break working in New York productions. Outside New York, many cities have professional regional or resident theater companies that produce their own seasons, with some works being produced regionally with hopes of eventually moving to New York. U.S. theater also has an active community theater culture, which relies mainly on local volunteers who may not be actively pursuing a theatrical career.

The Tony Awards presented annually by the American Theatre Wing and The Broadway League recognize excellence in live Broadway theatre and are the New York theatre industry's highest honor.

== Early history ==
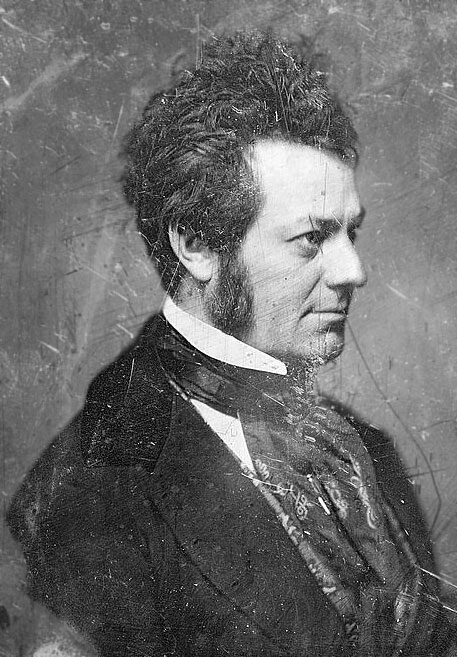
Edwin Forrest, a nineteenth-century American Shakespearean actor.

Before the first English colony was established in 1607, there were Spanish dramas and Native American tribes that performed theatrical events. Representations continued to be held in Spanish-held territories in what later became the United States. For example, at the Presidio of Los Adaes in the New Philippines (now in Louisiana), several plays were presented on October 12, 1721.

Although a theater was built in Williamsburg, Virginia in 1716, and the original Dock Street Theatre opened in Charleston, South Carolina in 1736, the birth of professional theater in the English colonies may have begun when Lewis Hallam arrived with his theatrical company in Williamsburg in 1752. Lewis and his brother William, who arrived in 1754, were the first to organize a complete company of actors in Europe and bring them to the colonies. They brought a repertoire of plays popular in London at the time, including Hamlet, Othello, The Recruiting Officer, and Richard III. The Merchant of Venice was their first performance, shown initially on September 15, 1752. Encountering opposition from religious organizations, Hallam and his company left for Jamaica in 1754 or 1755. Soon after, Lewis Hallam, Jr., founded the American Company, opened a theater in New York, and presented the first professionally mounted American play—The Prince of Parthia, by Thomas Godfrey—in 1767.

In the 18th century, laws forbidding the performance of plays were passed in Massachusetts in 1750, in Pennsylvania in 1759, and in Rhode Island in 1761, and plays were banned in most states during the American Revolutionary War at the urging of the Continental Congress. In 1794, president of Yale College, Timothy Dwight IV, in his "Essay on the Stage", declared that "to indulge a taste for playgoing means nothing more or less than the loss of that most valuable treasure: the immortal soul."

In spite of such laws, a few writers tried their hand at playwriting. Most likely, the first plays written in America were by European-born authors—we know of original plays being written by Spaniards, Frenchmen and Englishmen dating back as early as 1567—although no plays were printed in America until Robert Hunter's Androboros in 1714. Still, in the early years, most of the plays produced came from Europe; only with Godfrey's The Prince of Parthia in 1767 do we get a professionally produced play written by an American, although it was a last-minute substitute for Thomas Forrest's comic opera The Disappointment; or, The Force of Credulity, and although the first play to treat American themes seriously, Ponteach; or, the Savages of America by Robert Rogers, had been published in London a year earlier. 'Cato', a play about revolution, was performed for George Washington and his troops at Valley Forge in the winter of 1777–1778.

The Revolutionary period was a boost for dramatists, for whom the political debates were fertile ground for both satire, as seen in the works of Mercy Otis Warren and Colonel Robert Munford, and for plays about heroism, as in the works of Hugh Henry Brackenridge. The postwar period saw the birth of American social comedy in Royall Tyler's The Contrast, which established a much-imitated version of the "Yankee" character, here named "Jonathan". But there were no professional dramatists until William Dunlap, whose work as playwright, translator, manager and theater historian has earned him the title of "Father of American Drama"; in addition to translating the plays of August von Kotzebue and French melodramas, Dunlap wrote plays in a variety of styles, of which André and The Father; or, American Shandyism are his best.

== The 19th century ==
=== Prewar theater ===
At 825 Walnut Street in Philadelphia, Pennsylvania, is the Walnut Street Theatre, or, "The Walnut". Founded in 1809 by the Circus of Pepin and Breschard, "The Walnut" is the oldest theater in America. The Walnut's first theatrical production, The Rivals, was staged in 1812. In attendance were President Thomas Jefferson and the Marquis de Lafayette.

Provincial theaters frequently lacked heat and minimal theatrical property ("props") and scenery. Apace with the country's westward expansion, some entrepreneurs operated floating theaters on barges or riverboats that would travel from town to town. A large town could afford a long "run"—or period of time during which a touring company would stage consecutive multiple performances—of a production, and in 1841, a single play was shown in New York City for an unprecedented three weeks.

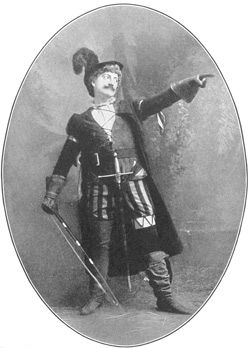
John Drew, a famous American actor, playing the part of Petruchio from The Taming of the Shrew

William Shakespeare's works were commonly performed. American plays of the period were mostly melodramas, a famous example of which was Uncle Tom's Cabin, adapted by George Aiken, from the novel of the same name by Harriet Beecher Stowe.

In 1821, William Alexander Brown established the African Grove Theatre in New York City. It was the third attempt to have an African-American theater, but this was the most successful of them all. The company put on not only Shakespeare, but also staged the first play written by an African-American, The Drama of King Shotaway. The theater was shut down in 1823. African-American theater was relatively dormant, except for the 1858 play The Escape; or, A Leap for Freedom by William Wells Brown, who was an ex-slave. African-American works would not be regarded again until the 1920s Harlem Renaissance.

A popular form of theater during this time was the minstrel show, which featured white (and sometimes, especially after the Civil War, black) actors dressed in "blackface (painting one's face, etc. with dark makeup to imitate the coloring of an African or African American)." The players entertained the audience using comic skits, parodies of popular plays and musicals, and general buffoonery and slapstick comedy, all with heavy utilization of racial stereotyping and racist themes.

Throughout the 19th century, theater culture was associated with hedonism and even violence; actors (especially women) were looked upon as little better than prostitutes. Jessie Bond wrote that by the middle of the 19th century, "The stage was at a low ebb, Elizabethan glories and Georgian artificialities had alike faded into the past, stilted tragedy and vulgar farce were all the would-be playgoer had to choose from, and the theater had become a place of evil repute". On April 15, 1865, less than a week after the end of the United States Civil War, Abraham Lincoln, while watching a play at Ford's Theater in Washington, D.C., was assassinated by a nationally popular stage-actor of the period, John Wilkes Booth.

Victorian burlesque, a form of bawdy comic theater mocking high art and culture, was imported from England about 1860 and in America became a form of farce in which females in male roles mocked the politics and culture of the day. Criticized for its sexuality and outspokenness, this form of entertainment was hounded off the "legitimate stage" and found itself relegated to saloons and barrooms. The female producers, such as Lydia Thompson were replaced by their male counterparts, who toned down the politics and played up the sexuality, until the burlesque shows eventually became little more than pretty girls in skimpy clothing singing songs, while male comedians told raunchy jokes.

The drama of the prewar period tended to be a derivative in form, imitating European melodramas and romantic tragedies, but native in content, appealing to popular nationalism by dramatizing current events and portraying American heroism. But playwrights were limited by a set of factors, including the need for plays to be profitable, the middle-brow tastes of American theater-goers, and the lack of copyright protection and compensation for playwrights. During this time, the best strategy for a dramatist was to become an actor and/or a manager, after the model of John Howard Payne, Dion Boucicault and John Brougham. This period saw the popularity of certain native character types, especially the "Yankee", the "Negro" and the "Indian", exemplified by the characters of Jonathan, Sambo and Metamora. Meanwhile, increased immigration brought a number of plays about the Irish and Germans, which often dovetailed with concerns over temperance and Roman Catholic. This period also saw plays about American expansion to the West (including plays about Mormonism) and about women's rights. Among the best plays of the period are James Nelson Barker's Superstition; or, the Fanatic Father, Anna Cora Mowatt's Fashion; or, Life in New York, Nathaniel Bannister's Putnam, the Iron Son of '76, Dion Boucicault's The Octoroon; or, Life in Louisiana, and Cornelius Mathews's Witchcraft; or, the Martyrs of Salem. At the same time, America had created new dramatic forms in the Tom Shows, the showboat theater and the minstrel show.

=== Postwar theater ===
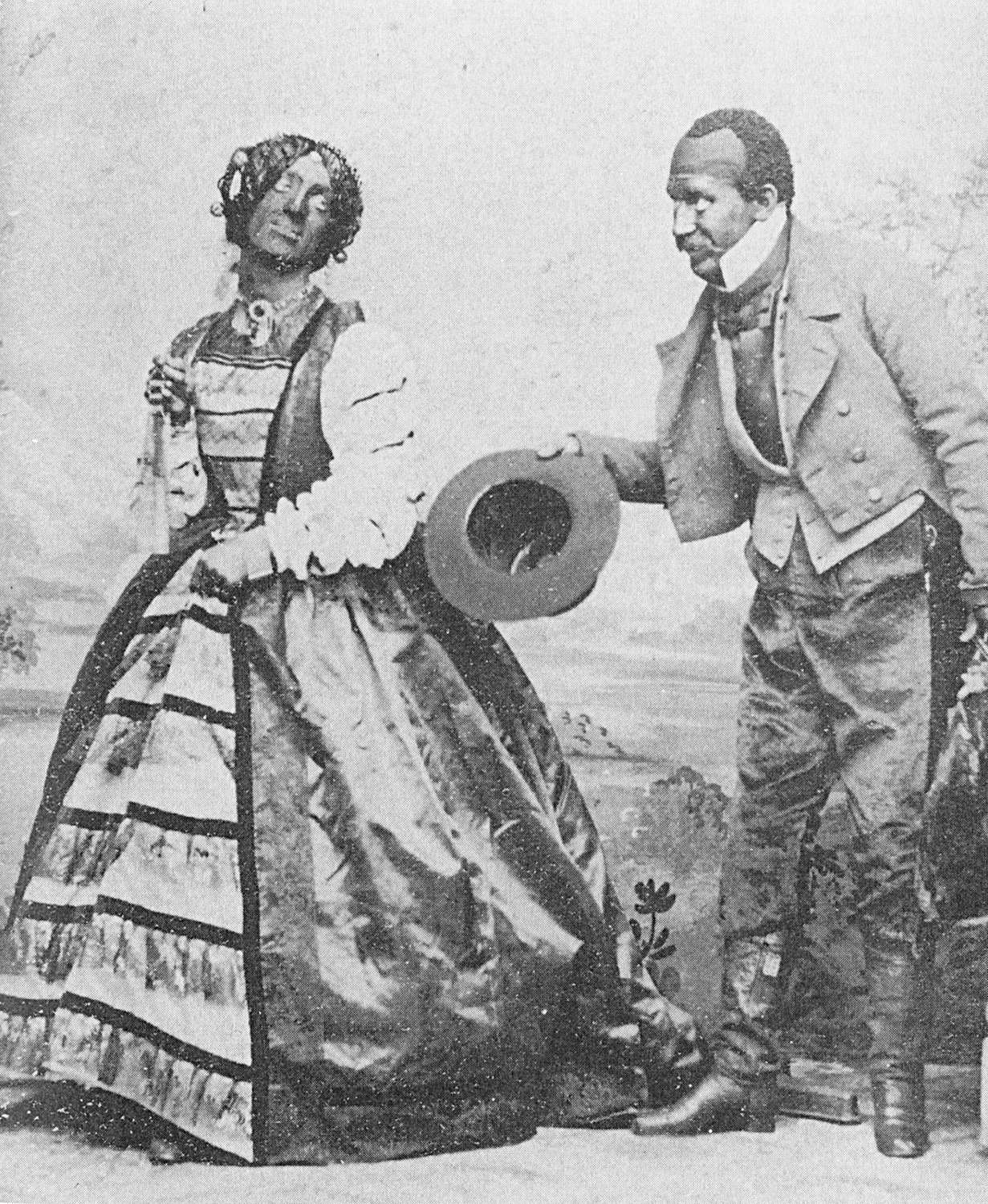
Minstrel show performers Rollin Howard (in female costume) and George Griffin, c. 1855.

During postbellum North, theater flourished as a postwar boom allowed longer and more-frequent productions. The advent of American rail transport allowed production companies, actors, and large, elaborate sets to travel easily between towns, which made permanent theaters in small towns feasible. The invention and practical application of electric lighting also led to changes to and improvements of scenery styles as well as changes in the design of theater interiors and seating areas.

In 1896, Charles Frohman, Al Hayman, Abe Erlanger, Mark Klaw, Samuel F. Flenderson, and J. Fred Zimmerman, Sr. formed the Theatrical Syndicate, which established systemized booking networks throughout the United States, and created a management monopoly that controlled every aspect of contracts and bookings until the turn of the 20th century, when the Shubert brothers founded rival agency, The Shubert Organization.

For playwrights, the period after the War brought more financial reward and aesthetic respect (including professional criticism) than was available earlier. In terms of form, spectacles, melodramas and farces remained popular, but poetic drama and romanticism almost died out completely due to the new emphasis upon realism, which was adopted by serious drama, melodrama and comedy alike. This realism was not quite the European realism of Ibsen's Ghosts, but a combination of scenic realism (e.g., the "Belasco Method") with a less romantic view of life that accompanied the cultural turmoil of the period. The most ambitious effort towards realism during this period came from James Herne, who was influenced by the ideas of Ibsen, Hardy and Zola regarding realism, truth, and literary quality; his most important achievement, Margaret Fleming, enacts the principles he expounded in his essay "Art for Truth's Sake in the Drama". Although Fleming did not appeal to audiences—critics and audiences felt it dwelt too much on unseemly topics and included improper scenes, such as Margaret nursing her husband's bastard child onstage—other forms of dramatic realism were becoming more popular in melodrama (e.g., Augustin Daly's Under the Gaslight) and in local color plays (Bronson Howard's Shenandoah). Other key dramatists during this period are David Belasco, Steele MacKaye, William Dean Howells, Dion Boucicault, and Clyde Fitch.

== The 20th century ==
Vaudeville was common in the late 19th and early 20th century, and is notable for heavily influencing early film, radio, and television productions in the country. (This was born from an earlier American practice of having singers and novelty acts perform between acts in a standard play.) George Burns was a very long-lived American comedian who started out in the vaudeville community, but went on to enjoy a career running until the 1990s.

Some vaudeville theaters built between about 1900 and 1920 managed to survive as well, though many went through periods of alternate use, most often as movie theaters until the second half of the century saw many urban populations decline and multiplexes built in the suburbs. Since that time, a number have been restored to original or nearly-original condition and attract new audiences nearly one hundred years later.

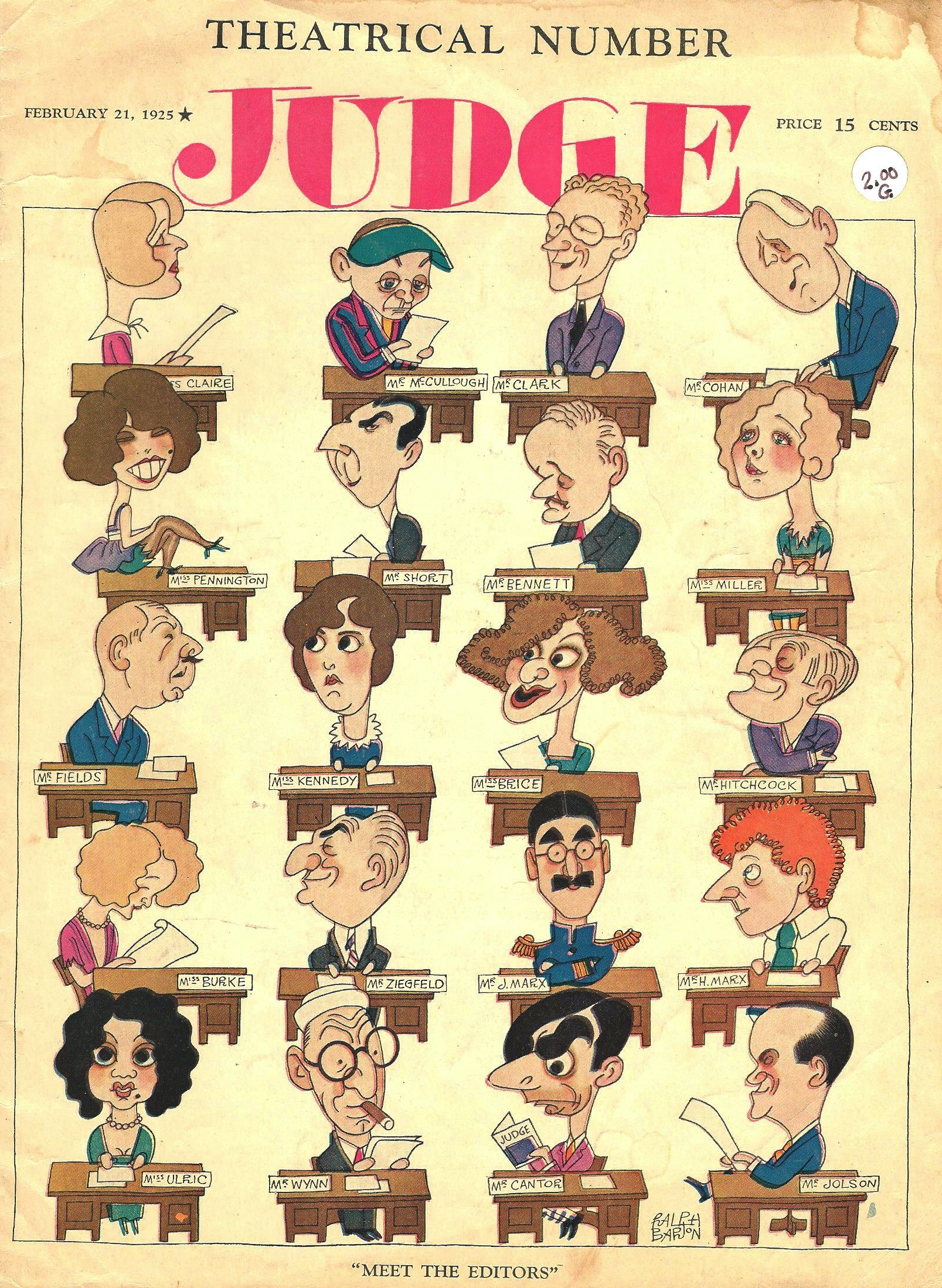
This February 21, 1925 Judge magazine cover by Ralph Barton features caricatures of various movie and theater personalities from the 1920s; click on a caricature to be taken to the corresponding person's Wikipedia article.

By the beginning of the 20th century, legitimate 1752 (non-vaudeville) theater had become decidedly more sophisticated in the United States, as it had in Europe. The stars of this era, such as Ethel Barrymore and John Barrymore, were often seen as even more important than the show itself. The advance of motion pictures also led to many changes in theater. The popularity of musicals may have been due in part to the fact the early films had no sound, and could thus not compete, until The Jazz Singer of 1927, which combined both talking and music in a moving picture. More complex and sophisticated dramas bloomed in this time period, and acting styles became more subdued. Even by 1915, actors were being lured away from theater and to the silver screen, and vaudeville was beginning to face stiff competition.

While revues consisting of mostly unconnected songs, sketches, comedy routines, and dancing girls (Ziegfeld girls) dominated for the first 20 years of the 20th century, musical theater eventually developed beyond this. One of the first major steps was Show Boat, with music by Jerome Kern and lyrics by Oscar Hammerstein. It featured songs and non-musical scenes which were integrated to develop the show's plot. The next great step forward was Oklahoma!, with lyrics by Hammerstein and music by Richard Rodgers. Its "dream ballets" used dance to carry forward the plot and develop the characters.

Amateur performing groups have always had a place alongside professional acting companies. The Amateur Comedy Club, Inc. was founded in New York City on April 18, 1884. It was organized by seven gentlemen who broke away from the Madison Square Dramatic Organization, a socially prominent company presided over by Mrs. James Brown Potter and David Belasco. The ACC staged its first performance on February 13, 1885. It has performed continuously ever since, making it the oldest, continuously performing theatrical society in the United States. Prominent New Yorkers who have been members of the ACC include Theodore, Frederick and John Steinway of the piano manufacturing family; Gordon Grant, the marine artist; Christopher La Farge, the architect; Van H. Cartmell, the publisher; Albert Sterner, the painter; and Edward Fales Coward, the theater critic and playwright. Elsie De Wolfe, Lady Mendl, later famous as the world's first professional interior decorator, acted in Club productions in the early years of the 20th Century, as did Hope Williams, and Julie Harris in the 1940s.

Early 20th century theater was dominated by the Barrymores—Ethel Barrymore, John Barrymore, and Lionel Barrymore. Other greats included Laurette Taylor, Jeanne Eagels, and Eva Le Gallienne. The massive social change that went on during the Great Depression also had an effect on theater in the United States. Plays took on social roles, identifying with immigrants and the unemployed. The Federal Theatre Project, a New Deal program set up by Franklin D. Roosevelt, helped to promote theater and provide jobs for actors. The program staged many elaborate and controversial plays such as It Can't Happen Here by Sinclair Lewis and The Cradle Will Rock by Marc Blitzstein. By contrast, the legendary producer Brock Pemberton (founder of the Tony Awards) was among those who felt that it was more than ever a time for comic entertainment, in order to provide an escape from the prevailing harsh social conditions: typical of his productions was Lawrence Riley's comedy Personal Appearance (1934), whose success on Broadway (501 performances) vindicated Pemberton.

The years between the World Wars were years of extremes. Eugene O'Neill's plays were the high point for serious dramatic plays leading up to the outbreak of war in Europe. Beyond the Horizon (1920), for which he won his first Pulitzer Prize; he later won Pulitzers for Anna Christie (1922) and Strange Interlude (1928) as well as the Nobel Prize in Literature. Alfred Lunt and Lynn Fontanne remained a popular acting couple in the 1930s.

1940 proved to be a pivotal year for African-American theater. Frederick O'Neal and Abram Hill founded ANT, or the American Negro Theater, the most renowned African-American theater group of the 1940s. Their stage was small and located in the basement of a library in Harlem, and most of the shows were attended and written by African-Americans. Some shows include Theodore Browne's Natural Man (1941), Abram Hill's Walk Hard (1944), and Owen Dodson's Garden of Time (1945). Many famous actors received their training at ANT, including Harry Belafonte, Sidney Poitier, Alice and Alvin Childress, Osceola Archer, Ruby Dee, Earle Hyman, Hilda Simms, among many others.

Mid-20th century theater saw a wealth of Great Leading Ladies, including Helen Hayes, Katherine Cornell, Tallulah Bankhead, Judith Anderson, and Ruth Gordon. Musical theater saw stars such as Ethel Merman, Beatrice Lillie, Mary Martin, and Gertrude Lawrence.

=== Post World War II theater ===
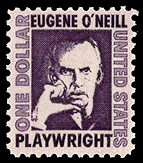
O'Neill stamp issued in 1967

After World War II, American theater came into its own. Several American playwrights, such as Arthur Miller and Tennessee Williams, became world-renowned.

In the 1950s and 1960s, experimentation in the Arts spread into theater as well, with plays such as Hair including nudity and drug culture references. Musicals remained popular as well, and musicals such as West Side Story and A Chorus Line broke previous records. At the same time, shows like Stephen Sondheim's Company began to deconstruct the musical form as it had been practiced through the mid-century, moving away from traditional plot and realistic external settings to explore the central character's inner state; his Follies relied on pastiches of the Ziegfeld Follies-styled revue; his Pacific Overtures used Japanese kabuki theatrical practices; and Merrily We Roll Along told its story backwards. Similarly, Bob Fosse's production of Chicago returned the musical to its vaudeville origins.

Facts and figures of the postwar theater

The postwar American theater audiences and box offices diminished, due to the undeclared "offensive" of television and radio upon the classical, legitimate theater. According to James F. Reilly, executive director of the League of New York Theatres, between 1930 and 1951 the number of legitimate theaters in New York City dwindled from 68 to 30. Besides that, the admissions tax has been a burden on the theater since 1918. It was never relaxed, and was doubled in 1943. Total seating capacity of the thirty most renowned legitimate theaters amounted to 35,697 seats in 1951. Since 1937 in New York City alone, 14 former legitimate theaters with a normal seating capacity of 16,955, have been taken over for either radio broadcasts or television performances.

In the late 1990s and 2000s, American theater began to borrow from cinema and operas. For instance, Julie Taymor, director of The Lion King directed Die Zauberflöte at the Metropolitan Opera. Also, Broadway musicals were developed around Disney's Mary Poppins, Tarzan, The Little Mermaid, and the one that started it all, Beauty and the Beast, which may have contributed to Times Square's revitalization in the 1990s. Also, Mel Brooks's The Producers and Young Frankenstein are based on his hit films.

=== Drama ===
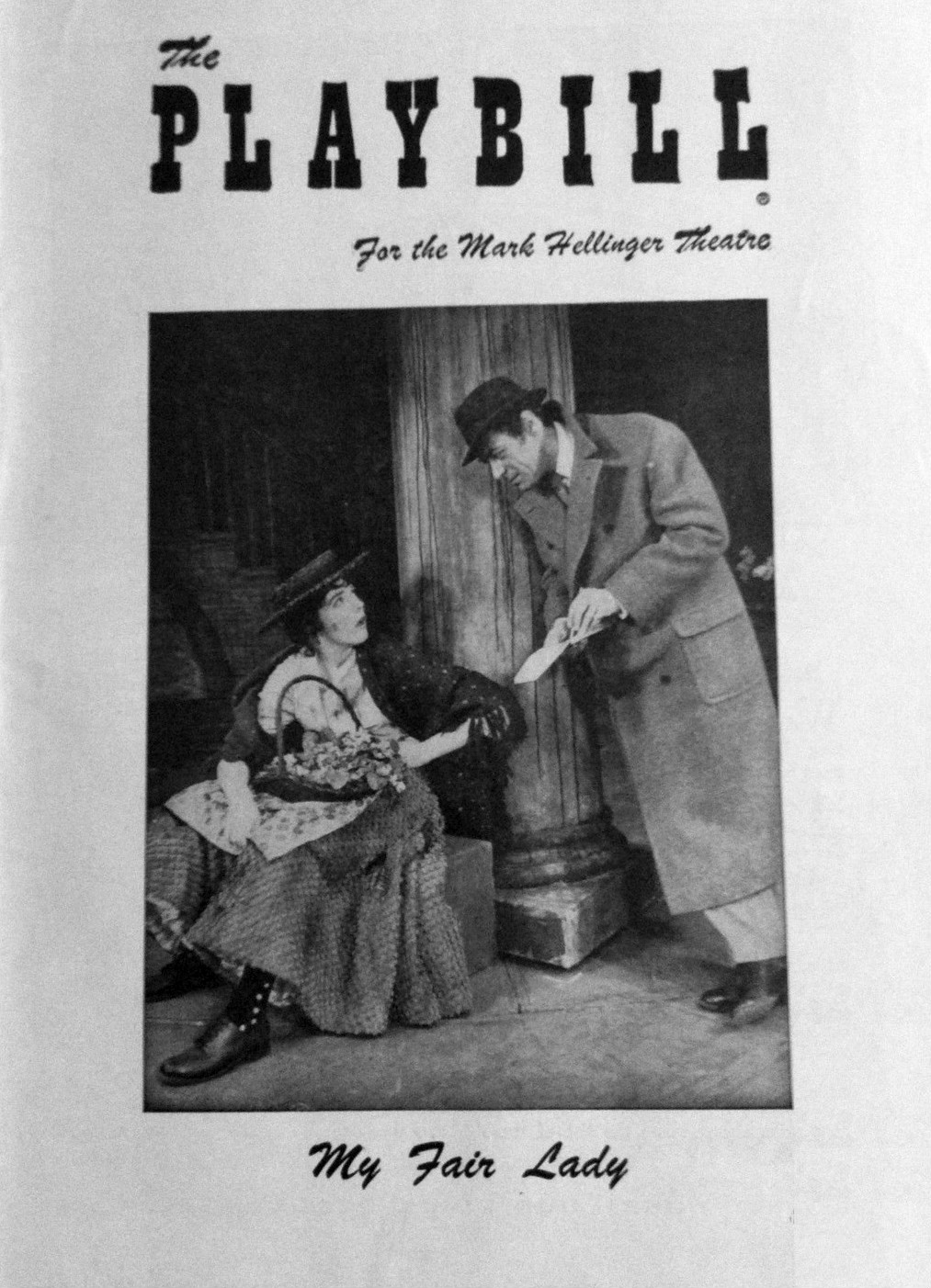
Program from Mark Hellinger Theatre of My Fair Lady (1913)

The early years of the 20th century, before World War I, continued to see realism as the main development in drama. But starting around 1900, there was a revival of poetic drama in the States, corresponding to a similar revival in Europe (e.g. Yeats, Maeterlinck and Hauptmann). The most notable example of this trend was the "Biblical trilogy" of William Vaughn Moody, which also illustrate the rise of religious-themed drama during the same years, as seen in the 1899 production of Ben-Hur and two 1901 adaptations of Quo Vadis. Moody, however, is best known for two prose plays, The Great Divide (1906, later adapted into three film versions) and The Faith Healer (1909), which together point the way to modern American drama in their emphasis on the emotional conflicts that lie at the heart of contemporary social conflicts. Other key playwrights from this period (in addition to continued work by Howells and Fitch) include Edward Sheldon, Charles Rann Kennedy and one of the most successful women playwrights in American drama, Rachel Crothers, whose interest in women's issues can be seen in such plays as He and She (1911).

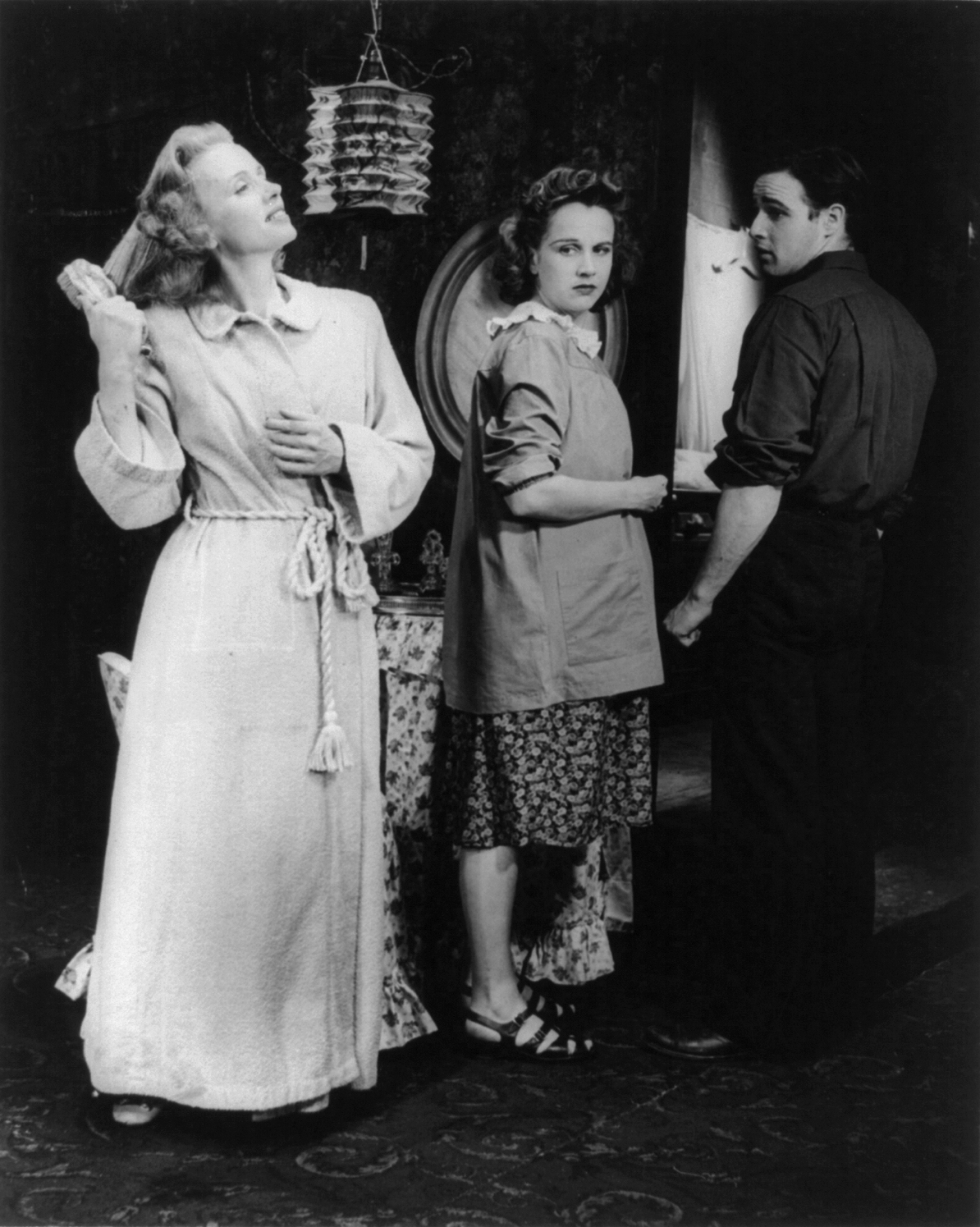
Jessica Tandy, Kim Hunter and Marlon Brando in the original Broadway production of A Streetcar Named Desire (1947)

During the period between the World Wars, American drama came to maturity, thanks in large part to the works of Eugene O'Neill and of the Provincetown Players. O'Neill's experiments with theatrical form and his combination of Naturalist and Expressionist techniques inspired other playwrights to use greater freedom in their works, whether expanding the techniques of Realism, as in Susan Glaspell's Trifles, or borrowing more heavily from German Expressionism (e.g., Elmer Rice's The Adding Machine), Other distinct movements during this period include folk-drama/regionalism (Paul Green's Pulitzer-winning In Abraham's Bosom), "pageant" drama (Green's The Lost Colony, about the mysterious Roanoke Colony), and even a return to poetic drama (Maxwell Anderson's Winterset). At the same time, the economic crisis of the Great Depression led to the growth of protest drama, as seen in the Federal Theater Project's Living Newspaper productions and in the works of Clifford Odets (e.g., Waiting for Lefty), as well as moralist drama, as in Lillian Hellman's The Little Foxes and The Children's Hour. Other key figures of this era include George S. Kaufman, George Kelly, Langston Hughes, S. N. Behrman, Sidney Howard, Robert E. Sherwood, and a set of playwrights who followed O'Neill's path of philosophical searching, Philip Barry, Thornton Wilder (Our Town) and William Saroyan (The Time of Your Life). Theater criticism kept pace with the drama, such as in the work of George Jean Nathan and in the numerous books and journals on American theater that were published during this time.

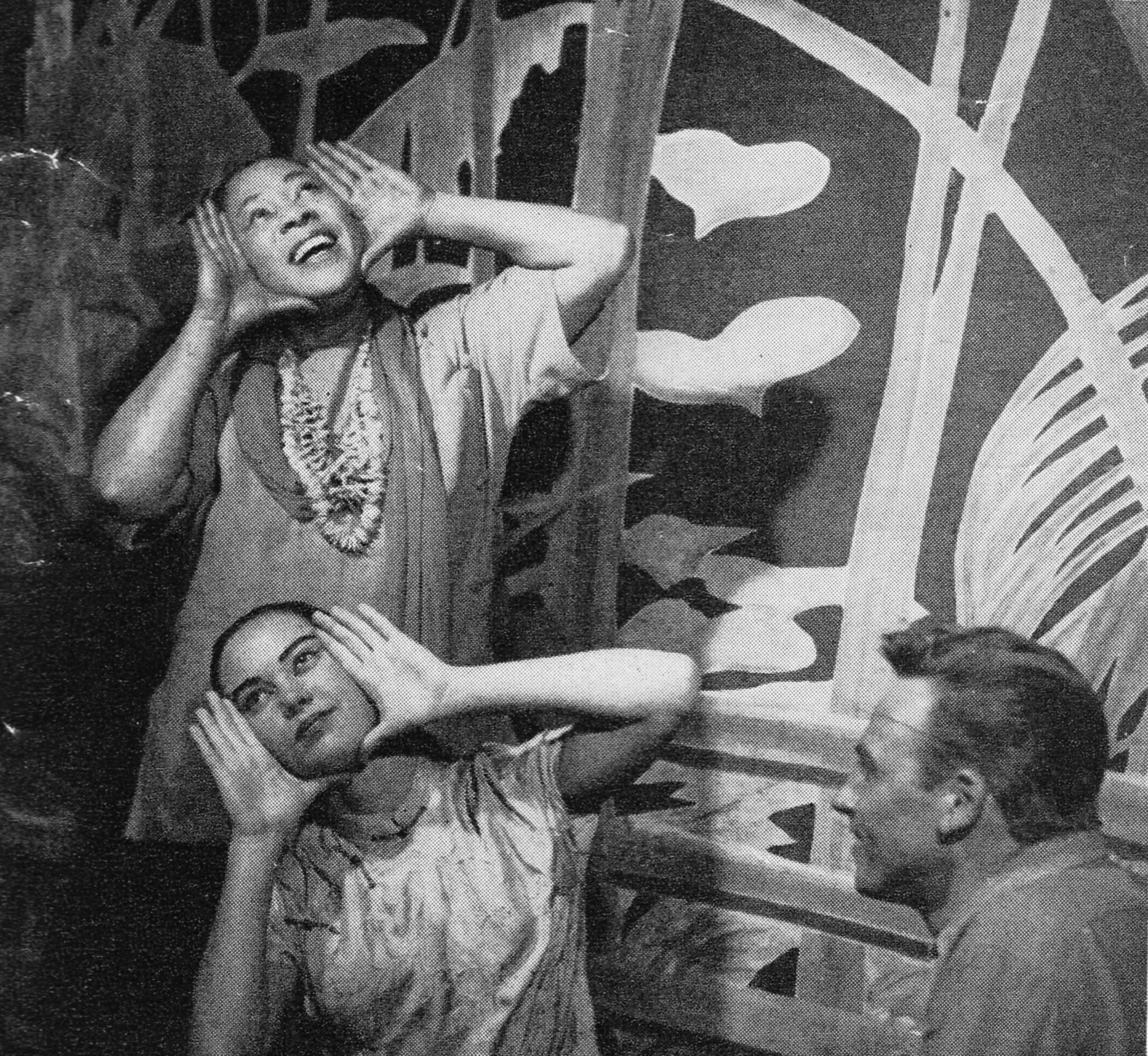
In South Pacific (1949) "Happy Talk": Cable (William Tabbert) watches Liat (Betta St. John) and Bloody Mary (Hall).

The stature that American drama had achieved between the Wars was cemented during the post-World War II generation, with the final works of O'Neill and his generation being joined by such towering figures as Tennessee Williams and Arthur Miller, as well as by the maturation of the musical theater form. Other key dramatists include William Inge, Arthur Laurents and Paddy Chayefsky in the 1950s, the avant garde movement of Jack Richardson, Arthur Kopit, Jack Gelber and Edward Albee the 1960s, and the maturation of black drama through Lorraine Hansberry, James Baldwin and Amiri Baraka. In the musical theater, important figures include Rodgers and Hammerstein, Lerner and Loewe, Betty Comden and Adolph Green, Richard Adler and Jerry Ross, Frank Loesser, Jule Styne, Jerry Bock, Meredith Willson and Stephen Sondheim.

The period beginning in the mid-1960s, with the passing of Civil Rights legislation and its repercussions, came the rise of an "agenda" theater comparable to that of the 1930s. Many of the major midcentury playwrights continued to produce new works, but were joined by names like Sam Shepard, Neil Simon, Romulus Linney, David Rabe, Lanford Wilson, David Mamet, and John Guare. Many important dramatists were women, including Beth Henley, Marsha Norman, Wendy Wasserstein, Megan Terry, Paula Vogel and María Irene Fornés. The growth of ethnic pride movements led to more success by dramatists from racial minorities, such as black playwrights Douglas Turner Ward, Adrienne Kennedy, Ed Bullins, Charles Fuller, Suzan-Lori Parks, Ntozake Shange, George C. Wolfe and August Wilson, who created a dramatic history of United States with his cycle of plays, The Pittsburgh Cycle, one for each decade of the 20th century. Asian American theater is represented in the early 1970s by Frank Chin and achieved international success with David Henry Hwang's M. Butterfly. Latino theater grew from the local activist performances of Luis Valdez's Chicano-focused Teatro Campesino to his more formal plays, such as Zoot Suit, and later to the award-winning work of Cuban Americans Fornés (multiple Obies) and her student Nilo Cruz (Pulitzer), to Puerto Rican playwrights José Rivera and Miguel Piñero, and to the Tony Award-winning musical about Dominicans in New York City, In the Heights. Finally, the rise of the gay rights movement and of the AIDS crisis led to a number of important gay and lesbian plays made by various dramatists, including Christopher Durang, Holly Hughes, Karen Malpede, Terrence McNally, Larry Kramer, Tony Kushner, whose Angels in America won the Tony Award two years in a row, and composer-playwright Jonathan Larson, whose musical Rent ran for over twelve years.

== Activism in Theater ==
Another major piece of American theater includes the activism in it, including works created by Lorraine Hansberry, such as A Raisin in the Sun. Her works push for representation for African Americans, as well as equality. Another activist in American theater is William Finn, who created the work A New Brain, about representation of LGBTQ+ individuals in entertainment.

== Contemporary American theater ==
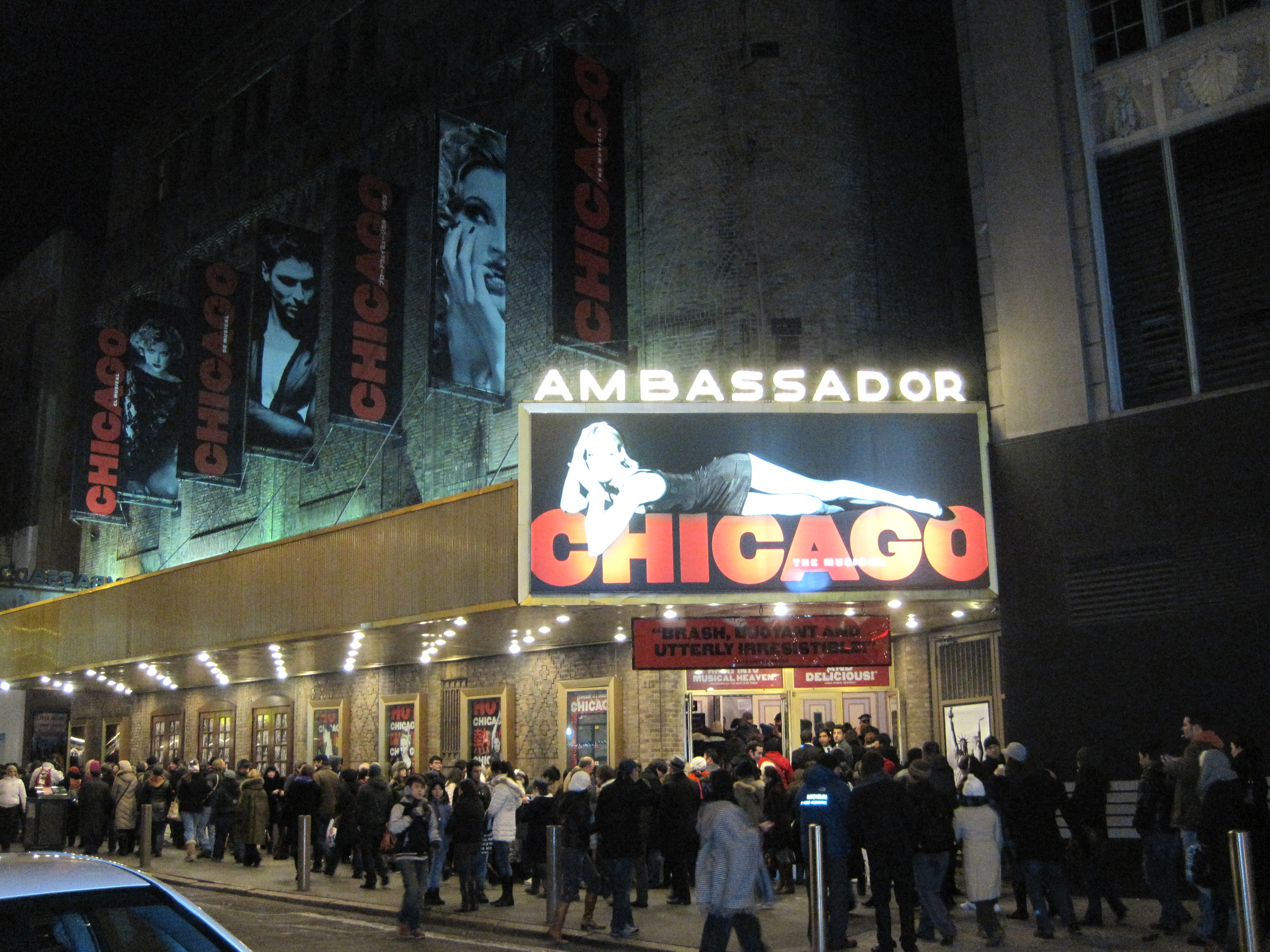
Chicago seen at night in 2010 at the Ambassador Theatre.

Although earlier styles of theater such as minstrel shows and vaudeville acts have disappeared from the landscape, theater still remains a popular contemporary American art form. Broadway productions still entertain millions of theatergoers even as productions have become more elaborate and expensive. At the same time, theater has also served as a platform for expression, and as a venue for identity exploration for underrepresented, minority communities, who have formed their own companies and created their own genres of works, including those created by August Wilson, Tony Kushner, David Henry Hwang, John Guare, and Wendy Wasserstein. Smaller urban theaters have stayed a source of innovation, and regional theaters remain an important part of theater life. Drama is also taught in high schools and colleges, which was not done in previous eras, and many become interested in theater through this genre.

== See also ==
- Dance in the United States
- English drama
- History of theatre
- Irish theatre
- List of American plays
- List of playwrights from the United States
- Theatre of Scotland
- Theatre of the United Kingdom
- Theatre of Wales
- Tony Awards — presented annually by the American Theatre Wing and The Broadway League in recognition of excellence in live Broadway theatre
