= Miracle (disambiguation) =

A miracle is an event that is inexplicable by natural or scientific laws and accordingly gets attributed to some supernatural or praeternatural cause.

Miracle, The Miracle, or variants, may also refer to:

== Literature ==
- Miracle (novel), by Danielle Steel, 2005
- Miracle: A Celebration of New Life, by Anne Geddes and Céline Dion, 2004
- Miracles (book), by C. S. Lewis, 1947
- The Miracle, a 1984 novel by Irving Wallace

== Theatre ==
- The Miracle (play), by Karl Vollmöller, 1911
- The Miracle Theater, later Smoky Mountain Opry Theater, in Pigeon Forge, Tennessee, U.S., and the title of its 2006 play
- A Miracle, a 2009 play by Molly Davies

== Film ==
- Das Mirakel, or The Miracle, a 1912 German silent film, based on the Vollmöller play
- The Miracle (1912 film), a British silent colour film, based on the Vollmöller play
- The Miracle (1913 film), a Swedish silent film
- Il Miracolo ('The Miracle'), a segment in the 1948 film L'Amore
- The Miracle (1959 film), based on Vollmöller's play and the 1912 film
- Miracle (1982 film), or Himala, a Philippine film
- Miracles (1986 film), an American comedy
- The Miracle (1987 film), a French comedy
- Miracles (1989 film), a Hong Kong action film starring Jackie Chan
- The Miracle (1991 film), a British drama
- The Miracle (2003 film), an Italian drama
- Miracle (2004 film), an American sports film
- The Miracle (2009 film), a Russian drama
- The Miracle (2013 film), a South Korean short film
- The Miracle (2015 film), a Turkish drama
- Miracle (2021 film), a Romanian crime drama
- Miracle: Letters to the President, a 2021 South Korean romantic drama

== Television ==
- Miracles (TV series), a 2003 American drama series
- "Miracles" (How I Met Your Mother), a 2008 episode
- "Miracles", an episode of the Australian children's series Lockie Leonard
- The Miracle, a 1985 British TV drama starring Keith Michell
- "The Miracle" (Doctors), a 2004 episode
- "The Miracle" (Roseanne), a 1997 episode
- CJIL-DT or The Miracle Channel, a Canadian Christian television station

== Music ==
- The Miracles, an American group featuring Smokey Robinson
- Miracle (rapper) (Samson Andah, born 1992), Australian rapper
- Symphony No. 96 (Haydn) by Haydn, nicknamed "The Miracle"

=== Albums ===
- Miracle (BoA album), 2002
- Miracle (Celine Dion album), and the title song, 2004
- Miracle, by Kane Gang, 1987
- Miracle (Nonpoint album), 2010
- Miracle (Puff Johnson album), 1996
- Miracle, by Robbie Seay Band, 2010
- Miracle (S.O.A.P. album), 2000
- Miracle, an EP by The Original Wailers, 2012
- Miracle (Third Day album), 2012
- Miracle (Willy DeVille album), 1987
- Miracle: Happy Summer from William Hung, by William Hung, 2005
- Miracles (Change album), 1981
- Miracles, a 2005 album by George Huff
- Miracles, a 1971 album by Yma Sumac
- Miracles (Two Steps from Hell album), 2014
- Miracles: The Holiday Album, by Kenny G, 1994
- The Miracle (album), by Queen, 1989, and the title song
- The Miracles (album), by The Miracles, 1978

=== Songs ===
- "Miracle", by Audio Adrenaline from Worldwide, 2013
- "Miracle", by Beni Arashiro from Beni
- "Miracle", by Bush from The Art of Survival, 2022
- "Miracle" (Calvin Harris and Ellie Goulding song), 2023
- "Miracle", by Caravan Palace from Chronologic, 2019
- "Miracle" (Cascada song), 2006
- "Miracle" (Chvrches song), 2018
- "Miracle", by Dayna Manning from Shades, 2002
- "Miracles", by Earth, Wind & Fire, from Powerlight, 1983
- "Miracle" (Foo Fighters song), 2006
- "Miracle", by Heavenly from Dust to Dust, 2004
- "Miracle" (Hurts song), 2013
- "Miracle" (Ilse DeLange song), 2009
- "Miracle" (Jon Bon Jovi song), 1990
- "Miracle", by Jonas Brothers from The Album, 2023
- "Miracle" (Julian Perretta song), 2015
- "Miracle" (Kimbra song), 2014
- "Miracle" (KT Tunstall song), 2014
- "Miracle", by Little Big Town from Wanderlust, 2016
- "Miracle", by The Luchagors from The Luchagors, 2007
- "Miracle", by Matisyahu, 2011
- "Miracle", by Michael W. Smith from Sovereign, 2014
- "Miracle", by The Moody Blues from Sur la Mer, 1988
- "Miracle" (Nonpoint song), 2010
- "Miracle", by OceanLab from Sirens of the Sea, 2008
- "Miracle" (Olive song), 1996
- "Miracle", by Paramore from Riot!, 2007
- "Miracle" (Paula Seling and Ovi song), 2014
- "Miracle" (Rina Aiuchi song), 2006
- "Miracle" (Samra Rahimli song), 2016
- "Miracle", by Sara Groves from Invisible Empires, 2011
- "Miracle", by Shinedown from Amaryllis, 2012
- "Miracle", by Sia from Music – Songs from and Inspired by the Motion Picture, 2021
- "Miracle" (Super Junior song), 2007
- "Miracle" (Whitney Houston song), 1991
- "Miracles", by Audio Adrenaline from Sound of the Saints, 2015
- "Miracles" (Coldplay song), 2014
- "Miracles (Someone Special)", by Coldplay, 2017
- "Miracles", by Colton Dixon, 2020
- "Miracles", by Dave Gahan from Hourglass, 2007
- "Miracles" (Don Williams song), 1981
- "Miracles" (Insane Clown Posse song), 2009
- "Miracles" (Jefferson Starship song), 1975
- "Miracles" by Joan Baez from Blowin' Away 1977
- "Miracles" (Ken Hirai song), 2001
- "Miracles", by LaVern Baker from LaVern, 1957
- "Miracles", by Nelly Furtado from The Spirit Indestructible, 2012
- "Miracles", by Nico & Vinz from Black Star Elephant, 2014
- "Miracles" (Pet Shop Boys song), 2003
- "Miracles", by Stacy Lattisaw from Sixteen, 1983
- "Miracles", by Stone Sour from Audio Secrecy, 2010
- "The Miracle", by Cheap Trick from The Latest, 2009
- "The Miracle", by Cliff Richard from Real as I Wanna Be, 1998
- "The Miracle" (song), by Queen, 1989
- "The Miracle", by The Shadows, 1964
- "The Miracle", by Vision Divine from Vision Divine, 1999
- "The Miracle (of Joey Ramone)", by U2, 2014

== People ==
- Miracle Chance (born 1992), English actress and musician
- Miracle Hikaru (born 1980), Japanese impressionist

== Places ==
- Miracle, Bell County, Kentucky, US
- Miracle, Lincoln County, Kentucky, US

== Sports ==
- Fort Myers Mighty Mussels, formerly Fort Myers Miracle, an American minor league baseball team
- Miracle- (Amer al-Barqawi, born 1997), esports Dota player

== Other uses ==
- Carnival Miracle, a cruise ship
- Miracle (dinghy), a small sailboat

== See also ==
- MIRACL, Mid-Infrared Advanced Chemical Laser, a directed-energy weapon
- Miracle Drug (disambiguation)
- Miracle Man (disambiguation)
- Miracle match (disambiguation)
- Miracle Mile (disambiguation)
- Miracle flatness, in mathematics
- Superstition (disambiguation)
