= The Monday Night Miracle =

Monday Night Miracle may refer to the following sporting contests:

- Monday Night Miracle (ice hockey), a 1986 NHL game between the Calgary Flames and the St. Louis Blues
- Monday Night Miracle (American football), a 2000 NFL game between the New York Jets and the Miami Dolphins
- Monday Night Miracle, a 2005 NFL game between the Washington Redskins and the Dallas Cowboys

== See also ==
- Monday Night comeback, a 2006 Chicago Bears–Arizona Cardinals NFL game
- Miracle match (disambiguation)
