= Miracle worker (disambiguation) =

A miracle worker is a person who performs miracles.

Miracle Worker or The Miracle Worker may also refer to:

== Film, television, and theatre ==
- The Miracle Worker, an American media franchise based on Helen Keller's autobiography The Story of My Life
  - The Miracle Worker (play), a 1959 play by William Gibson
  - The Miracle Worker (1962 film), an American biographical film directed by Arthur Penn and starring Anne Bancroft and Patty Duke
  - The Miracle Worker (1979 film), an American biographical television film directed by Paul Aaron and starring Patty Duke and Melissa Gilbert
  - The Miracle Worker (2000 film), an American biographical television film directed by Nadia Tass and starring Alison Elliott and Hallie Eisenberg
- The Miracle Worker (1936 film), a Soviet comedy film directed by Aleksandr Medvedkin
- Miracle Workers (2006 TV series), an American reality television series
- Miracle Workers (2019 TV series), an American anthology television series

== Music ==
- The Miracle Workers, an American rock band
- Miracle Worker, a 2000 album by The Rance Allen Group

=== Songs ===
- "Miracle Worker", a 2011 song by SuperHeavy
- "Miracle Worker", a 1976 song by The Chosen Few

== Other uses ==
- The Miracle Workers (Vance story), a 1958 novella by Jack Vance

== See also ==
- Miracle (disambiguation)
