= Theater in America =

Theater in America may refer to:

- Theater in the United States
- Theater in America, precursor of Great Performances TV series on PBS
