= Superstition (disambiguation) =

Superstition is a belief, not based on human reason or scientific knowledge, that future events may be influenced by one's behaviour in some magical or mystical way.

Superstition may also refer to:

== Arts and entertainment ==
=== Film and television ===
- Superstition (1919 film), a German film directed by Georg Jacoby
- Superstition (1920 film), a 1920 film starring Hoot Gibson
- Superstition (1982 film), a 1982 horror film
- Superstition (TV series), a 2017 television series
- Superstition (play), a play by James Nelson Barker
- Superstitions (advertising campaign), an advertising campaign for Anheuser-Busch's Bud Light
- "Superstition", a 1989 episode of the TV series ALF

=== Music ===
- Superstition (Shirley Scott album), 1973
- Superstition (Siouxsie and the Banshees album), 1991
- Superstition (The Birthday Massacre album), 2014
- "Superstition" (song), a 1972 song by Stevie Wonder, covered in 1973 by Beck, Bogert & Appice and in 1986 by Stevie Ray Vaughan
- "Superstitious" (song), a 1988 song by Europe
- "Superstitious", a 2023 song by Big Time Rush from Another Life

=== Other media ===
- Superstitious (novel), a 1995 novel by R. L. Stine

== Other uses ==
- Superstition Freeway, the part of U.S. Route 60 through Metropolitan Phoenix, Arizona
- Superstition Mountains, a range of mountains east of Phoenix, Arizona

== See also ==
- Baseball superstition
- List of superstitions
- Russian traditions and superstitions
- Theatrical superstitions
