= Miracle Man (disambiguation) =

Miracle Man is a Marvel Comics character and one of the Fantastic Four's earlier villains.

Miracle Man may also refer to:

== Film ==
- The Miracle Man (1919 film), a 1919 lost film, featuring Lon Chaney
- The Miracle Man (1932 film), a 1932 remake of the 1919 film, featuring Boris Karloff
- Znachor (1937 film), (The Miracle Man), a 1937 Polish drama film

== Music ==
- "Miracle Man", a 2023 song by Bebe Rexha from Bebe
- "Miracle Man", a 2008 song by Capital Lights from This Is an Outrage!
- "Miracle Man", a 1977 song by Elvis Costello from My Aim Is True
- "Miracle Man", a 2020 song by Oliver Tree from Ugly Is Beautiful
- "Miracle Man", a 1988 song by Ozzy Osbourne from No Rest for the Wicked

== Other uses ==
- Miracleman (character), the current name of Marvelman, a British superhero created by Mick Anglo
- Miracle Man (superhero), a similar British superhero also created by Anglo
- "Miracle Man" (The X-Files), an episode of The X-Files
- The Miracle Man (play), a 1914 Broadway play by George M. Cohan from which the film versions are based
- George Stallings, an American baseball manager

== See also ==
- Man of Miracles, a 1974 album by Styx
- Man of Miracles (comics), in the Spawn comic book series
- Miracle (disambiguation)
- Hadji Ali, a vaudeville performer known as The Great Egyptian Miracle Man
