= John Augustus Stone =

American writer

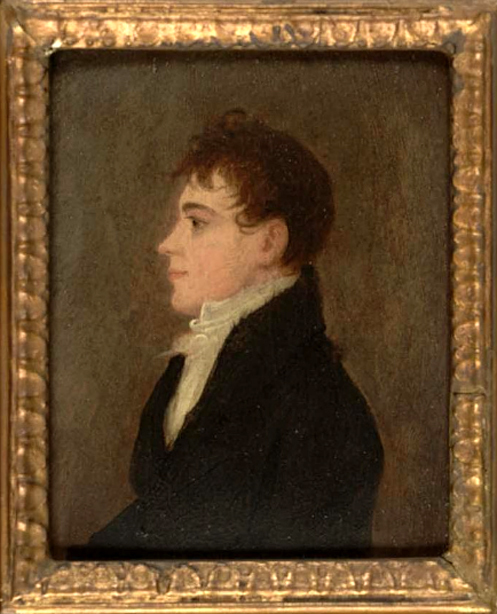
- Born: December 15, 1801; Concord, Massachusetts, US
- Died: May 28, 1834 (aged 32); Philadelphia, Pennsylvania, US
- Resting place: Machpelah Cemetery, Philadelphia
- Occupations: Actor, Dramatist, and Playwright
- Known for: Metamora; or, The Last of the Wampanoags

John Augustus Stone (December 15, 1801 – May 28, 1834) was an American actor, dramatist, and playwright, best known as the author of Metamora; or, The Last of the Wampanoags.

== Biography ==
Stone appeared on the New York stage beginning in 1822. He wrote Metamora, as a vehicle for Edwin Forrest, who offered as a prize $500 (equivalent to $12,100 in 2025) and half of the proceeds from the third night. William Cullen Bryant headed a committee which chose Stone's play as the best of 14 submitted. The play, first produced in 1829, told the life of the Wampanoag sachem King Philip. He later wrote The Ancient Briton and Fauntleroy for Forrest, who had also become his friend.

He married Amelia Greene Legge, an actress. She later married Nathaniel Harrington Bannister.

Stone suffered periods of insanity and he committed suicide by jumping into the Schuylkill River. He was buried at Machpelah Cemetery in Philadelphia. His grave at Machpelah was marked by a monument erected by Forrest. The inscription reads: "Erected to the memory of the author of 'Metamora' by his friend, Edwin Forrest". Some sources cite Forrest's success with Stone's plays and his paltry remuneration as causing his suicide. At a party on May 7, 1895, Henry F Stone presented the Forrest Home for Retired Actors in Philadelphia with a portrait of his father John Augustus Stone painted by Sully.

When Machpelah Cemetery was closed in 1895, Stone's remains were disinterred on 23 April 1895 in the presence of his son Henry. The majority of bodies were moved to North Mount Moriah Cemetery (also known as Graceland) in Yeadon, Pennsylvania, which is not affiliated with the nearby Mount Moriah Cemetery, which was later abandoned.

== Works ==
In addition to Metamora, Stone wrote a number of other plays:

- Montrano, or Who's the Traitor, 1822 Philadelphia
- Restoration, or the Diamond Cross, 1824 Chatham Garden Theater in New-York.
- Tancred, or the Siege of Antioch 1827
- La Roque; a Regicide Charleston
- Fauntleroy; or, the Fatal Forgery Charleston
- Touretoun
- Banker of Rouen
- Tancred, King of Sicily March 16, 1831
- The Demoniac, or the Prophet's Bride April 12, 1831
- The Ancient Briton, March 27, 1833
- The Knight of the Golden Fleece, or The Yankee in Spain, 1834

Of these, the most notable is Knight of the Golden Fleece, featuring famous Yankee actor George Handel Hill as a fish out of water in romanticized Spain. Unfortunately, the script was never printed and does not survive. In 1842 John Quincy Adams took his granddaughter Maria Louisa Adams (1828-1859) to see Knight of the Golden Fleece which he considered to be "dead shot", i.e. highly accurate, precise, or unerring.

== Legacy ==
His very popular 1829 play Metamora; or, The Last of the Wampanoags had a stage run over 60 years. This play inspired four new Midwestern towns to adopt the name Metamora: Metamora, Ohio, in the 1830s, Metamora Township, Michigan, in 1838 after the 1836–1837 Toledo War caused the removal of Metamora from Michigan Territory to Ohio, Metamora, Indiana, also in 1838, and Metamora, Illinois, in 1845.
