= Metamora; or, The Last of the Wampanoags =

1829 play by John Augustus Stone

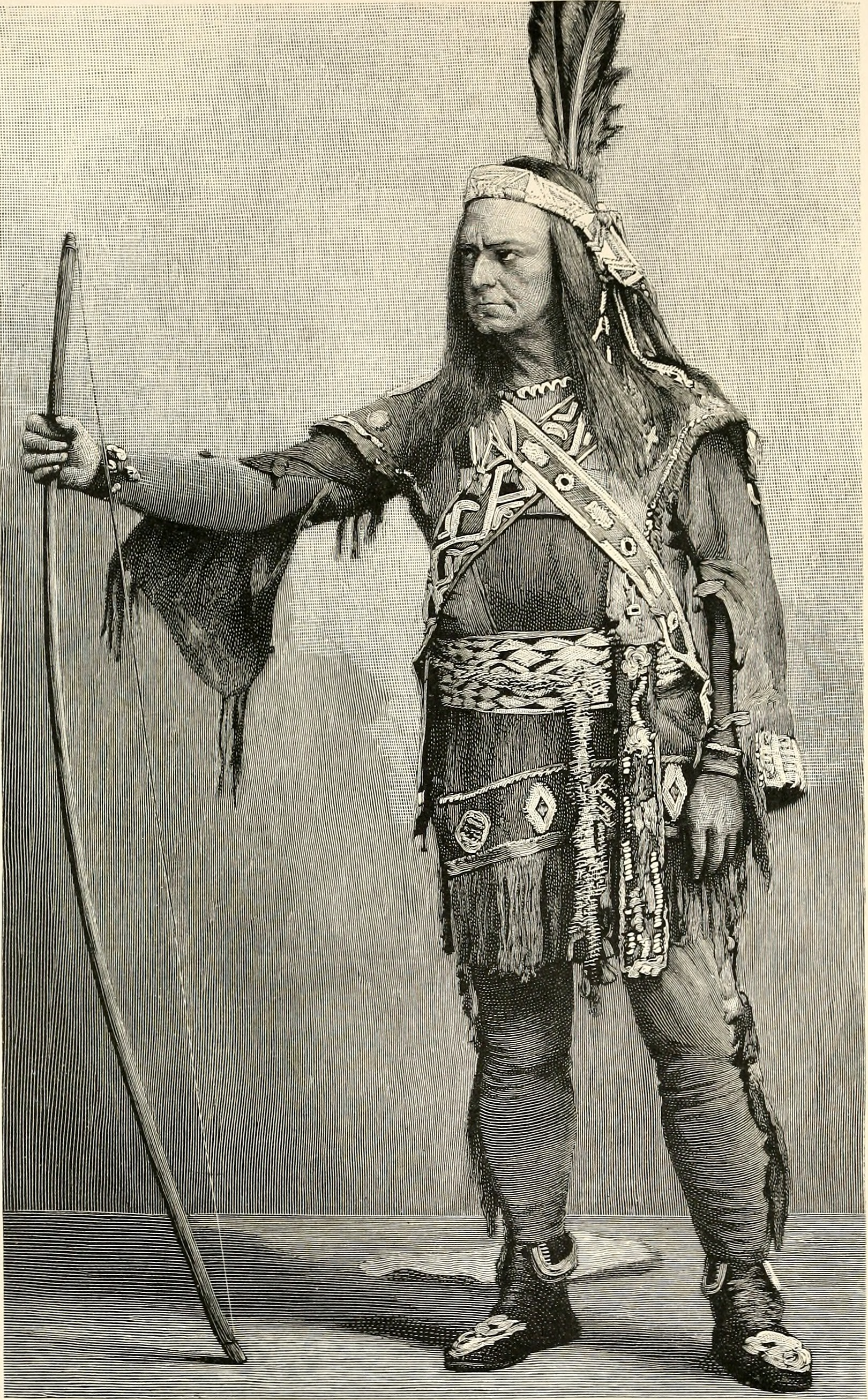
- Edwin Forrest as Metamora in 1861
- Original language: English
- Written by: John Augustus Stone
- Subject: Native Americans
- Genre: Drama

Premiere
- Date: December 15, 1829
- Place: Park Theater, New York City

Metamora; or, The Last of the Wampanoags is a play written by Massachusetts playwright John Augustus Stone reinterpreting King Philip's War (1675–78), a colonial war in New England. The play debuted on December 15, 1829, at the Park Theater in New York City. It starred Shakespearean actor Edwin Forrest, who portrayed Metamora. Metamora is a tragedy that reinterprets major events of King Phillip's War, including Metamora's death. Metamora is known by many names including King Philip and Metacomet. The play changed Metamora's identity from being a barbarian to a heroic warrior who cursed the white men as he died. Metamora gave the audience reassurance that the Wampanoags were truly dead.

== History ==
On November 28, 1828, a contest was posted in the New York Critic by American actor Edwin Forrest offering a prize of $500 for an original play which met such criteria as, “a tragedy, in five acts, of which the hero, or principal character, shall be an aboriginal of this country". Forrest, looking to produce a play suiting his strengths, created the contest as an opportunity to boost his acting career. With his play, Metamora, or the Last of the Wampanoags, playwright and actor John Augustus Stone stood out among his competitors and took home the prize. The play, which opened on December 15, 1829, was an instant hit. Due to a combination of the highly publicized contest, Forrest's growing celebrity, and the timely subject matter of the play itself, the performances resonated with audiences across the growing country, earning theaters record profits, of which Stone received very little. Forrest acted in many plays, but the two that were successful were Metamora and The Gladiator. After its debut, Metamora quickly spread into various cities where it was continuously performed.

== Synopsis ==
Metamora follows the story of an Indian Hero, his uprising and downfall all at the hands of the English settlers during the Puritan takeover in the 17th century within New England. The story deals with a conflict between the New England Settlers and the Wampanoags, which turned a once civil conflict violent through force. At the play's start, there is peace and a willingness to collaborate between the Wampanoags and the Puritans. However, as the play progresses, so does the rising conflict that leads to the full-on attack on Metamora's tribe. Throughout the play, Stone depicts the bloody and brutal conflict that came with the heaviest losses within the region. The shaping of the battle into a melodramatic tale of passion and force fostered Metamora into this noble savage. Edwin Forrest, along with the other actors, empathized the guilt, love ache, and betrayal to reflect the actual suffering of the battle. Following the end of the play, Metamora kills his wife, Nehmeokee, to protect her from the invading New England settlers, leaving the audience with a sense of heaviness and loss as Metamora, his wife, and their son lie still in their final breaths.

== Themes and criticism ==
Though Metamora is referred to as an Indian tragedy, its themes of love, war, dramatic deaths and suicides, and declaratory speeches make the play better described as a romantic melodrama with its "rather spectacular contrast between the way it tells the story of Oceana's romantic affairs and the way it treats the tragic demise of Metamora." Metamora was seen as "the major indian play of the century, and its hero is regarded as the most developed noble savage of the nineteenth-century stage." The depiction of Metamora as a kind and “noble savage,” turned violent by force especially resonated with the mid-19th century audience. Most critics raved over the play, however, some critical response was negative, and very harsh.

== American character types: the Indian ==
In the years following pivotal events in history such as the American Revolution and the War of 1812, a strong feeling of nationalism infiltrated early America. This sense of national pride influenced not only everyday life, but also became evident in the arts, including early American theatre. During this time, the majority of what was being performed was British theatre, and Americans had a desire to create more American-specific drama. America needed to establish itself in the midst of the well-developed drama and literature of other nations, as well as set a standard for what is uniquely American. However, this need for nationalism soon manifested itself in drama through American character types: the Negro, the Yankee, and in the case of Metamora, and the Indian. Depictions of oppressed, underdog characters overcoming captivity, or dying gloriously, represented the themes of freedom and liberty that characterized the newly independent America. These character types became symbols throughout not only American drama, but all throughout American history.

== Indian drama ==
Metamora success can be attributed to Stone's crafting of a lead character who embodied the raw, the grotesque, and the real of the natural world, which resulted in a narrative that felt authentic and emotionally fulfilling. The first American play to feature a Native American protagonist was a closet drama from 1776, marking the early beginnings of what would become a dominant literary trend throughout the 19th century. Metamora drew inspiration from the New England Chief Metacom or King Philip, notorious for leading attacks against English settlers during 1675–1676. The growing distrust between differences led various settlers to demand that Metacom's tribe surrender their weapons; as tensions escalated, Metacom launched a violent uprising. Metamora was written during a period of tragedy, offering a powerful artistic lens through which audiences could confront the harsh realities of American history. This feud marked the final major attempt by Native Americans to expel settlers from New England. Lasting fourteen months, the conflict destroyed twelve frontier towns before concluding in August 1676 with Metacom's capture and execution. Although King Philip's War has been previously overlooked in our modern history, it remains one of the most destructive conflicts in American history. It further ignited early discussions around national identity, cultural conflict, and the struggle to recognize and respect difference. Metamora emphasizes the importance of varying backgrounds in which shape national identity, as King Philip's War brought about physical rage and mental tyranny. The social triumphs with identity that took place in the late 1970s lead to the historical destruction and chaos, with Metamora allowing audiences to truly understand the mishaps of history through a meticulous craft of art.

== Metamora and the Indian Removal Act ==
Opening only one year before the passage of Andrew Jackson’s Indian Removal Act, Metamora's depiction of a scorned and violent savage against English settler victims raises questions about the motives of both Forrest and Stone. In an essay analyzing the issue, Scott Martin discusses the possible relationship between the time of release and Jackson’s Indian removal policy, he discusses that many recent interpretations of the play and the way Forrest portrays Metamora concluded that it was tactical. Considering the play happened to premiere right around when the Southeastern tribes' future became a prevalent issue in congressional debates. As well a big talking point in society, these interpretations believe that this was purposeful timing and acting. Mark Mallett argues that Forrest's partiality to the Democratic Party, and to Jackson, was the driving force behind Metamora. “Forrest’s play,” he asserts, “brought the Democrat’s message back into the theatre... effectively distracting public attention from the horrors of the government’s Indian Removal campaign.” However, others contend that Metamora was simply a vehicle for Forrest's career and a story that suited the romantic ideals of its audience. Mallet discusses the fact that there may be an overemphasis of political and racial ideology when analyzing the relationship between Metamora and Jackson's Indian policy that can blur the context of the relationship rather than clarify it. When trying to understand Metamora's place in antebellum culture, scholars are quick in trying to detect attempts to engineer political advantage in art and popular culture from this period. Scott Martin believes these scholars should stop and rethink their interpretations.

== Revivals ==
In October 2004, the play was performed at the Metropolitan Playhouse in New York City as Metamora: Last of the Wampanoags! as a work exploring American theatrical history. Directed by Alex Roe, then in his third year at the company, with Matthew Trumbull (b. Minnesota) starring as Metamora.

== Bibliography ==
- Metamora: Or, the Last of the Wampanoags, Feedback Theatre Books, August 1996, ISBN 978-0-937657-24-9
- Barrett, Lawrence. American Actor Series: Edwin Forrest. Bronx: Benjamin Blom, Inc., 1881
- Martin, Scott C. “‘Metamora’: Nationalism, Theater, and Jacksonian Indian Policy.” Journal of the Early Republic, Vol. 19, No. 1. Spring: University of Pennsylvania Press, 1999.
- Meserve, Walter J. An Outline History of American Drama. 2nd ed. New York: Feedback Theatrebooks; Brooklin: Prospero Press, 1994.
- “Metamora, by John Augustus Stone ROMANTICIZING WAR.” Metropolitan Play House. n.d. Web. 2/24/16
- Moody, Richard. Dramas from the American Theatre 1762–1909. Cleveland: The World Publishing Company, 1966.
- Rees, James. The Life of Edwin Forrest. With Reminiscences and Personal Recollections. Philadelphia: T.B. Peterson and Brothers, 1874.
- Stone, John Augustus. Metamora: Or, The Last of The Wampanoags. 1829. Web.
- Mallet, Mark E. (March 21, 1993). "THE GAME OF POLITICS": EDWIN FORREST AND THE JACKSON DEMOCRATS. Vol. V (2nd ed.). Wheaton, Illinois: American Theatre & Drama Society. pp. 31–46.

== See also ==
- "Metamora, by John Augustus Stone ROMANTICIZING WAR", Metropolitan Play House
- "The last Indian" syndrome revisited: Metamora, take two., Intertexts 22-March-06
