= Greg Paslawski =

Canadian ice hockey player

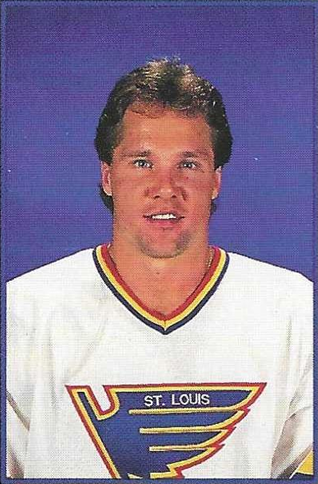
- Born: August 25, 1961 (age 64) Kindersley, Saskatchewan, Canada
- Height: 5 ft 11 in (180 cm)
- Weight: 189 lb (86 kg; 13 st 7 lb)
- Position: Right wing
- Shot: Right
- Played for: Montreal Canadiens; St. Louis Blues; Winnipeg Jets; Buffalo Sabres; Quebec Nordiques; Philadelphia Flyers; Calgary Flames
- NHL draft: Undrafted
- Playing career: 1981–1996

Gregory Stephen "Mud" Paslawski (born August 25, 1961) is a Canadian former professional ice hockey right winger who played eleven seasons in the National Hockey League (NHL) for the Montreal Canadiens, St. Louis Blues, Winnipeg Jets, Buffalo Sabres, Quebec Nordiques, Philadelphia Flyers and Calgary Flames.

Paslawski was born in Kindersley, Saskatchewan to parents Sally and Walter Paslawski. He played junior hockey for the Prince Albert Raiders. Not drafted, Paslawski signed with the Montreal Canadiens in October 1981. He made his professional debut in 1983–84 with Montreal. He was traded later that season to the St. Louis Blues.

From there, his best season was the 1985–86 NHL season, where he was a key contributor to the Blues' road to an upset victory, scoring a hat trick against the Minnesota North Stars and scored the game-tying goal in game six of the Conference finals against Calgary, a game known as the Monday Night Miracle. His best season statistically was the 1986–87 season, when he scored 29 goals and 64 points, both career highs. In all, he played in 650 games in his NHL career, scoring 187 goals and 185 assists for 372 points.

== Career statistics ==
			Regular season					Playoffs
Season	Team	League	GP	G	A	Pts	PIM	GP	G	A	Pts	PIM
1979–80	Prince Albert Raiders	SJHL	58	17	32	49	142	—	—	—	—	—
1980–81	Prince Albert Raiders	SJHL	59	55	60	115	106	—	—	—	—	—
1981–82	Nova Scotia Voyageurs	AHL	43	15	11	26	31	—	—	—	—	—
1982–83	Nova Scotia Voyageurs	AHL	75	46	42	88	32	6	1	3	4	8
1983–84	Montreal Canadiens	NHL	26	1	4	5	4	—	—	—	—	—
1983–84	St. Louis Blues	NHL	34	8	6	14	17	9	1	0	1	2
1984–85	St. Louis Blues	NHL	72	22	20	42	21	3	0	0	0	2
1985–86	St. Louis Blues	NHL	56	22	11	33	18	17	10	7	17	13
1986–87	St. Louis Blues	NHL	76	29	35	64	27	6	1	1	2	4
1987–88	St. Louis Blues	NHL	17	2	1	3	4	3	1	1	2	2
1988–89	St. Louis Blues	NHL	75	26	26	52	18	9	2	1	3	2
1989–90	Winnipeg Jets	NHL	71	18	30	48	14	7	1	3	4	0
1990–91	Winnipeg Jets	NHL	43	9	10	19	10	—	—	—	—	—
1990–91	Buffalo Sabres	NHL	12	2	1	3	4	—	—	—	—	—
1991–92	Quebec Nordiques	NHL	80	28	17	45	18	—	—	—	—	—
1992–93	Philadelphia Flyers	NHL	60	14	19	33	12	—	—	—	—	—
1992–93	Calgary Flames	NHL	13	4	5	9	0	6	3	0	3	0
1993–94	Calgary Flames	NHL	15	2	0	2	2	—	—	—	—	—
1993–94	Peoria Rivermen	IHL	29	16	16	32	12	6	3	3	6	0
1994–95	Peoria Rivermen	IHL	69	26	43	69	15	9	9	1	10	4
1995–96	Peoria Rivermen	IHL	60	16	27	43	22	1	0	0	0	0
NHL totals			650	187	185	372	169	60	19	13	32	25
