= Amelia Greene Legge =

American theatre actress (1794–1873)

Mrs. Stone
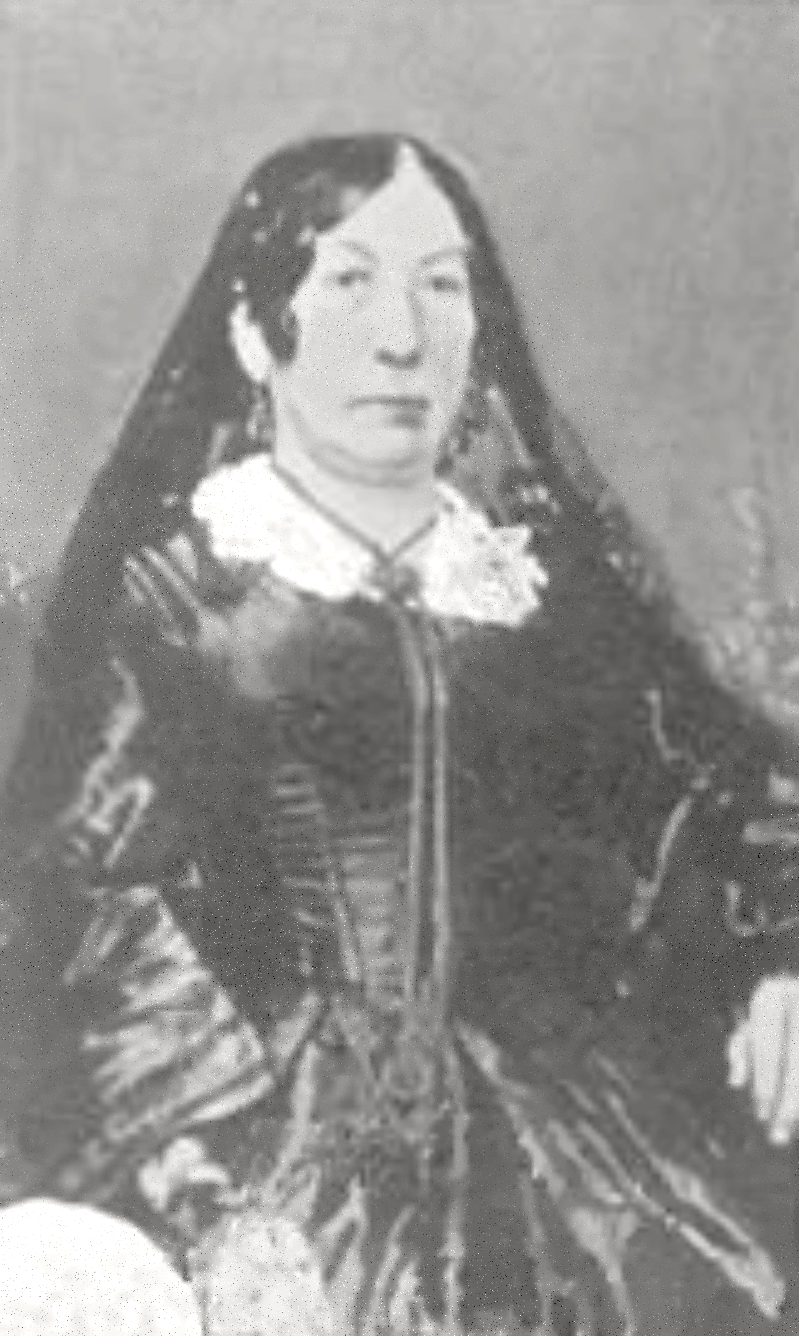
- Amelia Greene Legge Stone Bannister
- Born: 1794; New York State, US
- Died: 1873; New York State, US
- Occupation: Actress
- Spouses: John Augustus Stone; (Married 1821-1834); Nathaniel Harrington Bannister; (Married 1837-1847)
- Children: 2

Amelia Greene Legge (1794, New York - 1873) was an American actress. She started acting in 1799 when she appeared on stage for the first time.

== Work ==
Legge started acting at a young age, first appearing on stage in 1799 in Charleston. She later starred in Infidelity in 1837, Gaulantus the Gault in 1839, and The Destruction of Jerusalem in 1839, all of which were written by her second husband, Nathaniel Bannister.

In Legge's active years, she was a member of New York's City Theatre Company, the Lafayette Amphitheatre company, and the New Chatham Theatre company.

== Family ==
In 1821, Amelia Greene Legge married actor and playwright, John Augustus Stone. They had two sons who became actors:

- Christopher Lucius Stone (about 1821 Massachusetts or about 1822 Maryland – 20 December 1856 Manhattan, New York County, New York)
- Henry F Stone (11 July 1832 Pennsylvania – 18 April 1919 Brooklyn, Kings County, New York)

The whole family moved to Philadelphia in 1831.

In 1834, John was having periods of insanity from the grief of poverty. He took his own life by jumping into the Schuylkill River in Philadelphia leaving Legge a widow.

Legge was remarried 1837 to a different actor and playwright, Nathaniel Bannister, with whom she worked for by starring in a selection of plays he wrote.

After Nathaniel's death in 1847, Legge did not remarry. Her obituary in a local newspaper indicates that she died 15 November 1873 in Jersey City, Hudson County, New Jersey, and was buried in the theater actors' section of Cypress Hills Cemetery in Brooklyn, Kings County, New York.
