= Doug Wickenheiser =

Canadian ice hockey player (1961–1999)

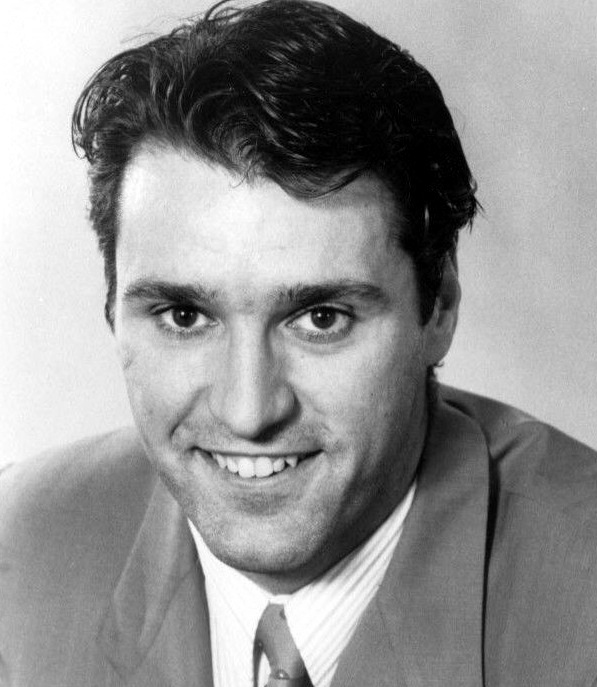
- Wickenheiser in 1988
- Born: March 30, 1961 Regina, Saskatchewan, Canada
- Died: January 12, 1999 (aged 37) St. Louis, Missouri, U.S.
- Height: 6 ft 1 in (185 cm)
- Weight: 196 lb (89 kg; 14 st 0 lb)
- Position: Centre
- Shot: Left
- Played for: Montreal Canadiens; St. Louis Blues; Vancouver Canucks; New York Rangers; Washington Capitals
- NHL draft: 1st overall, 1980; Montreal Canadiens
- Playing career: 1980–1994

Douglas Peter Wickenheiser (March 30, 1961 – January 12, 1999) was a Canadian ice hockey player, who was drafted first overall by the Montreal Canadiens in the 1980 NHL entry draft.

== Career ==
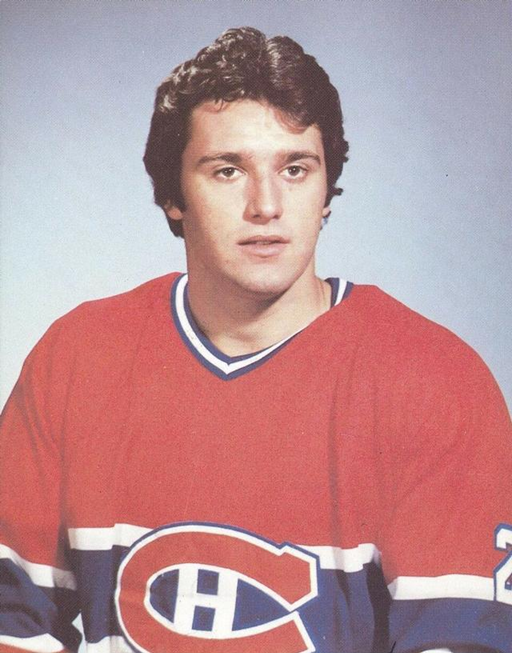
1982 photo of Wickenheiser for Montreal Canadiens

Wickenheiser was born in Regina, Saskatchewan. A superstar in Major Junior hockey with the Regina Pats, he led the Western Hockey League in goal scoring (89) during the 1979–80 WHL season, captained the Pats to a berth in the Memorial Cup, and was the CHL Player of the Year. Wickenheiser was rated by The Hockey News as the top draft prospect in 1980 and was subsequently selected first overall by the Montreal Canadiens. Many Canadiens' fans, particularly French Canadian fans who desperately wanted the club to select francophone star Denis Savard, were unhappy with the selection (Savard would go on to play for the Canadiens after being traded to the team, winning the Stanley Cup with them in 1993), and Montreal media attention soon turned negative. While Wickenheiser struggled to adjust to the NHL game, Savard (drafted third overall) would quickly become a superstar with the Chicago Blackhawks, further angering some Montreal fans.

In his fourth season with the Canadiens, the club lost patience with Wickenheiser's slow development and traded him to the St. Louis Blues. Probably his most famous moment with the Blues was during the 1985–86 playoffs in a game dubbed the "Monday Night Miracle" on May 12, 1986, when after St. Louis made a large comeback against the Calgary Flames, and he scored the overtime winner to force a Game 7 in the Campbell Conference Finals. The Blues would however, lose the deciding game 2–1.

During his NHL career, Wickenheiser also played for the Vancouver Canucks, New York Rangers and Washington Capitals, but did not play in the NHL after the 1989-90 season, spending his last four professional seasons in the minors and overseas. In 556 games, he scored 111 goals and 165 assists.

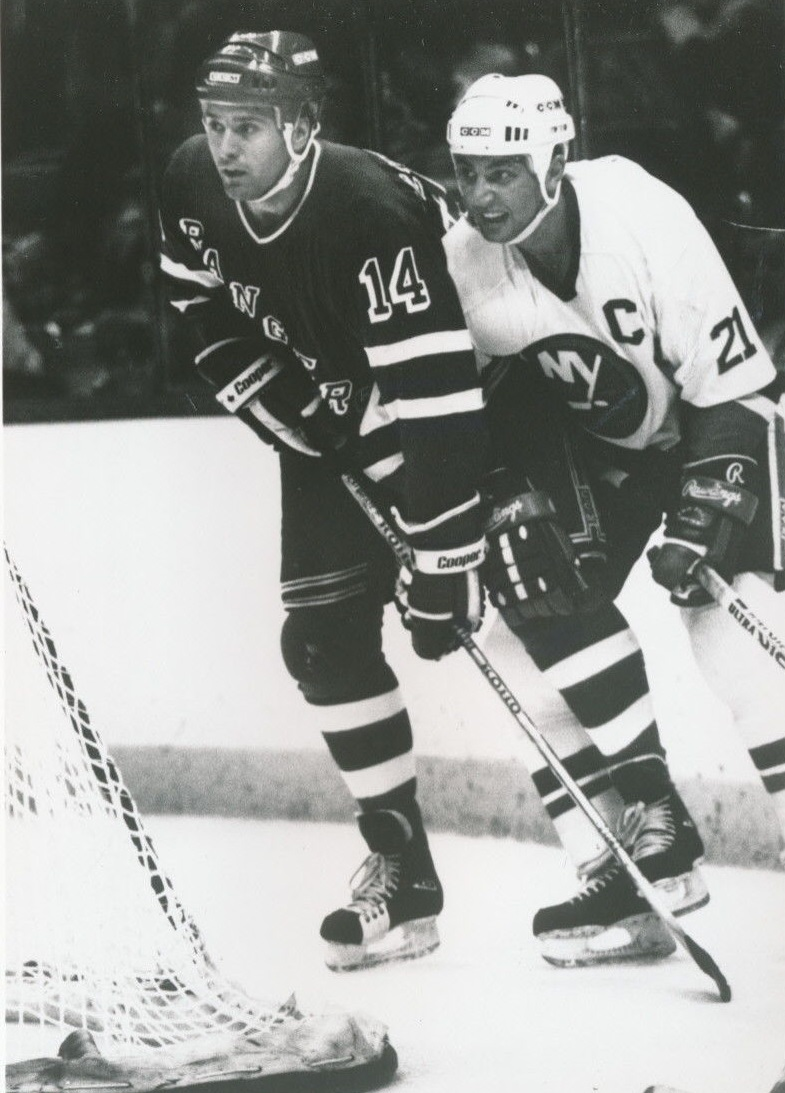
Wickenheiser playing for the New York Rangers in 1988

== Cancer ==
In August 1994, Wickenheiser had an epithelioid sarcoma (a rare form of cancer), which he had first noticed four years earlier, removed from his wrist. Three years later, in October 1997, the disease came back as lung cancer, at which point it was inoperable, then it got worse a year later when he was diagnosed with brain cancer. He died on January 12, 1999, at the age of 37 in St. Louis. His life story was remembered in the book The Last Face Off: The Doug Wickenheiser Story written in March 2000 by Ted Pepple, Wickenheiser's father-in-law. The Mid-States Club Hockey Association, the governing body for high school hockey in St. Louis, named their championship trophy for small school/second division teams in his honor.

== Legacy ==
An arena in his hometown of Regina, Saskatchewan, has been named Doug Wickenheiser Arena in his honour. The arena is located at the corner of Arnason St. and Rochdale Blvd. in the city's Lakewood neighbourhood.

The Doug Wickenheiser Memorial Trophy which is awarded annually by the Western Hockey League to its humanitarian of the year was renamed in 2001 in honour of Wickenheiser.

The Blues have not reissued Wickenheiser's #14 since his death, though it has not been formally retired. Blues' players wore a special helmet decal with the wick of a candle and the number 14 during parts of the 1997–98 and 1998–99 seasons. In 1999, a banner with that logo, which became the symbol of The Fourteen Fund, the official Blues charity established in his memory, was permanently placed in the rafters at the Blues' home arena, the Kiel Center (now the Enterprise Center). The emblem was worn by all NHL players in the 1999 NHL All-Star Game, and was also sold to the public for a small donation and became a popular trend among youth hockey players in St. Louis. One of the two high school state championships played at Enterprise Center is named after him.

== Personal life ==
Wickenheiser was the father of soccer player Carly Wickenheiser and a cousin of former Canadian national team player and Hockey Hall of Fame inductee Hayley Wickenheiser.

== Career statistics ==
			Regular season					Playoffs
Season	Team	League	GP	G	A	Pts	PIM	GP	G	A	Pts	PIM
1976–77	Regina Blues	SJHL	59	42	46	88	63	—	—	—	—	—
1977–78	Regina Pats	WCHL	68	37	51	88	49	13	4	5	9	4
1978–79	Regina Pats	WHL	68	32	62	94	141	—	—	—	—	—
1979–80	Regina Pats	WHL	71	89	81	170	99	18	14	26	40	20
1979–80	Regina Pats	MC	—	—	—	—	—	4	1	4	5	8
1980–81	Montreal Canadiens	NHL	41	7	8	15	20	—	—	—	—	—
1981–82	Montreal Canadiens	NHL	56	12	23	35	43	—	—	—	—	—
1982–83	Montreal Canadiens	NHL	78	25	30	55	49	—	—	—	—	—
1983–84	Montreal Canadiens	NHL	27	5	5	10	6	—	—	—	—	—
1983–84	St. Louis Blues	NHL	46	7	21	28	19	11	2	2	4	2
1984–85	St. Louis Blues	NHL	68	23	20	43	36	—	—	—	—	—
1985–86	St. Louis Blues	NHL	36	8	11	19	16	19	2	5	7	12
1986–87	St. Louis Blues	NHL	80	13	15	28	37	6	0	0	0	2
1987–88	Vancouver Canucks	NHL	80	7	19	26	36	—	—	—	—	—
1988–89	Canada	Intl	26	7	15	22	40	—	—	—	—	—
1988–89	New York Rangers	NHL	1	1	0	1	0	—	—	—	—	—
1988–89	Flint Spirits	IHL	21	9	7	16	8	—	—	—	—	—
1988–89	Washington Capitals	NHL	16	2	5	7	4	5	0	0	0	2
1988–89	Baltimore Skipjacks	AHL	2	0	5	5	0	—	—	—	—	—
1989–90	Washington Capitals	NHL	27	1	8	9	20	—	—	—	—	—
1989–90	Baltimore Skipjacks	AHL	35	9	19	28	22	12	2	5	7	22
1990–91	HC Asiago	ITA	35	25	32	57	9	—	—	—	—	—
1991–92	EHC Unna	DEU.3	8	14	6	20	36	—	—	—	—	—
1991–92	SV Bayreuth	DEU.2	4	4	3	7	6	—	—	—	—	—
1991–92	Klagenfurter AC	AUT	22	7	12	19	—	—	—	—	—	—
1992–93	Peoria Rivermen	IHL	80	30	45	75	30	4	0	2	2	2
1993–94	Fort Wayne Komets	IHL	73	22	37	59	22	14	2	2	4	4
NHL totals			556	111	165	276	286	41	4	7	11	18

== Awards ==
- Bob Brownridge Memorial Trophy (WHL leading scorer) - 1980
- WHL First All-Star Team – 1980

Preceded by Pierre Lacroix	CHL Player of the Year; 1980	Succeeded by Dale Hawerchuk
Preceded by Rob Ramage	NHL first overall draft pick 1980	Succeeded by Dale Hawerchuk
Preceded by Dave Hunter	Montreal Canadiens first-round draft pick 1980	Succeeded by Mark Hunter
