= American theater in the 1920s =

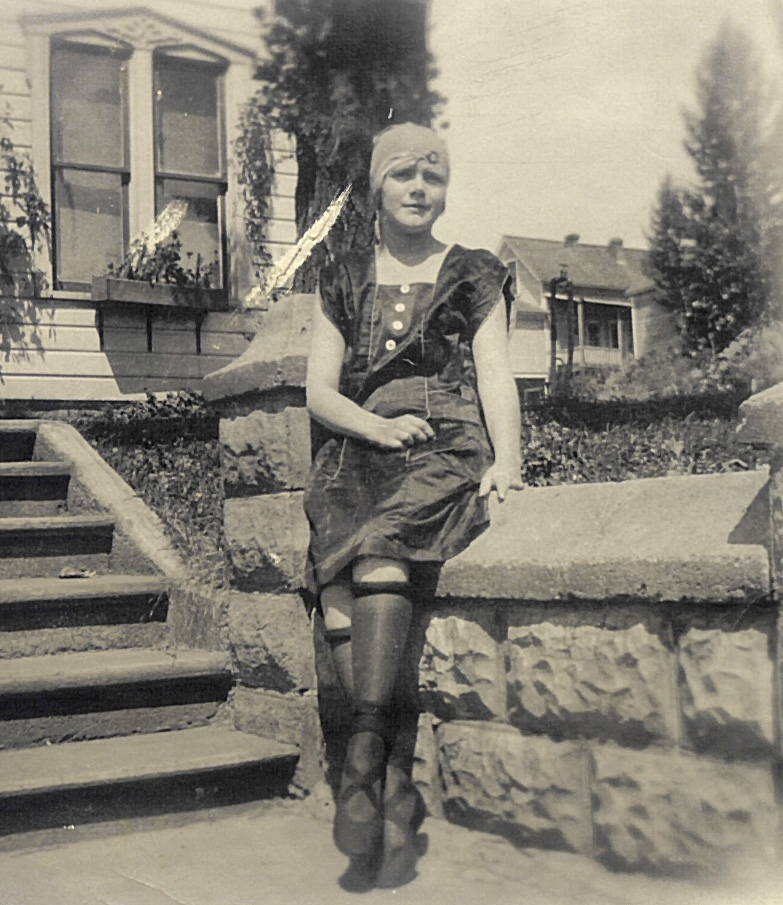
Flappers in New Woman Era, 1920s

In the 1920s, theater in the United States and the cinema of the United States were both increasingly active. Broadway was reaching its peak, Classic theater was working to be recognized, and the cinema business was growing as well. Within this decade, there were many changes within the social, economic, and legal environment in the United States, and these changes were often reflected into the art forms of the time period. In the 1920s, theater utilized jazz, Vaudeville, straight plays, and musicals.

== Jazz ==
A defining aspect of theater of the 1920s was the development of jazz. Jazz was credited with being the "first distinctively American art form to disseminate US culture, style, and modernity across the globe". Jazz's spread across the globe also applied to American lives and art forms. During Prohibition, "jazz cabarets and nightclubs would often stage elaborate floor shows that patrons could watch and participate in" and would hire performers like comedians and actors in order to bring an "adaption of Vaudeville comedy to the nightclub". Performances were often used in clubs and speakeasies in order to hide the fact that people were flocking in for illegal alcohol, which led to the "upgrade of entertainment into a small Vaudeville show". Speakeasies, due to their highly theatrical and liberal atmosphere, allowed for theater to permeate everyday behavior.

== Theatrical practices ==
Other common theatrical practices, particularly in the early 1920s, were musical revues, which had musical scenes, dramatic sketches, and Vaudeville-type performances. In the 1920s, theater was categorized into two main divisions: "legitimate" or classical theater, serious and dramatic plays, and musical, comedy, and commercial theater, which tended to be more upbeat and happy.

== Vaudeville ==
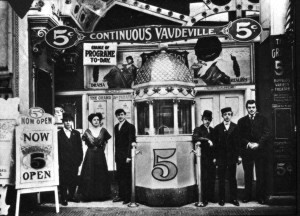
Vaudeville Theater, Buffalo, NY, circa 1900

Vaudeville in the 1920s was one of the largest forms of entertainment and was a rival to legitimate theater. Vaudeville is a genre of theater that encompasses a variety of small performances, where each act is unrelated to one another. Performers in Vaudeville specialized in one skill and repeated these skills at performances. Vaudeville was known for being more condensed in attempts to reaching out to the American middle class. Because of its theaters, affordable housing, receptive audience, and recreational activities, Los Angeles became a favorite city for Vaudeville performers. This shift of theater towards the West began the start of "Vaudeville-only" theaters. Vaudeville became a large part of many communities in the 1920s. However, as the popularity of film grew in the late 1920s, Vaudeville began to fall out of favor. Many former Vaudeville stars, such as Charlie Chaplin and Burt Williams, left Vaudeville to become silent film actors.

== Legitimate and non-commercial theater ==
The legitimate theater category mostly comprises classic plays (i.e. Greek tragedies, Shakespeare, etc.) and straight plays, usually in the style of realism. For the most part, legitimate theater denounced improvisation and theater that was only meant to bring amusement. The ultimate goal of many performers was to allow America's theater practice to be seen as worthwhile and comparable to European theater practices, and for the country to be recognized as a viable center of dramatic art. The various institutions pushing the legitimization of American theater included the Theatre Guild, The Civic Repertory Theatre, and various "little theaters". Of the many playwrights of this era, Eugene O'Neill was one of the biggest proponents for "bringing American theatre to maturity" and was thus one of the most well-known playwrights of the time. It was playwrights like O'Neill that wanted to progress America's theater into tackling real issues, like poverty (The Hairy Ape), alcoholism, unstable lifestyles, interracial marriage, and sex equality, among other things.

== Musical comedy and commercial theater ==
=== Broadway ===
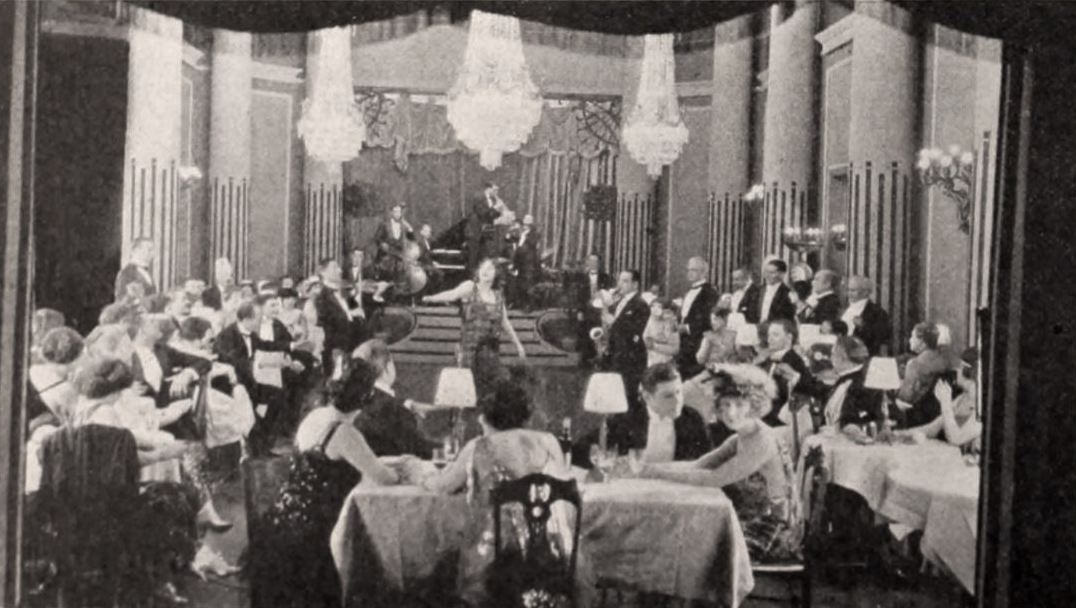
Broadway, 1922

The 1920s were a time of extreme growth for the music and Broadway industry. Musicals and musical comedies were considered "all-American" and were the biggest money-makers in the industry. Musicals were sometimes considered "commercial theater" —with flashy lights, outrageous costumes, and scandalous stage behavior, many musicals were considered trivial and superficial, existing simply for entertainment and money-making purposes. Despite this criticism, especially from the legitimate theater world, this form of theater reached its peak in the 1920s, during the "jazz age". Jazz music and jazz culture were highly influential in the proliferation of musical comedies. Some of the most renowned composers and writers of the 1920s were Irving Berlin, Richard Rodgers, Jerome Kern, and George Gershwin. Some musicals which were popular in the 1920s were Tip-Toes and Show Boat.

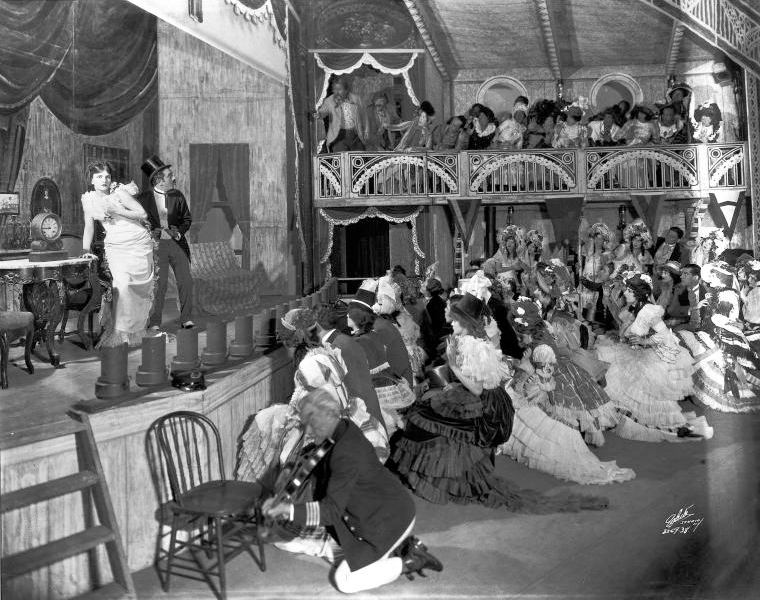
Show Boat, 1928

== Cinema ==
In addition to live performance, Hollywood movies are also a key aspect of 1920s theater history. Although the first movie was made in the late 1800s, movies began to gain traction in the 1920s, which led to a decline in the popularity of theater. With over 20 studios by the end of the 1920s, the movie making industry released an average of 800 films a year during this decade, compared to today's average of 500.

=== Silent film ===
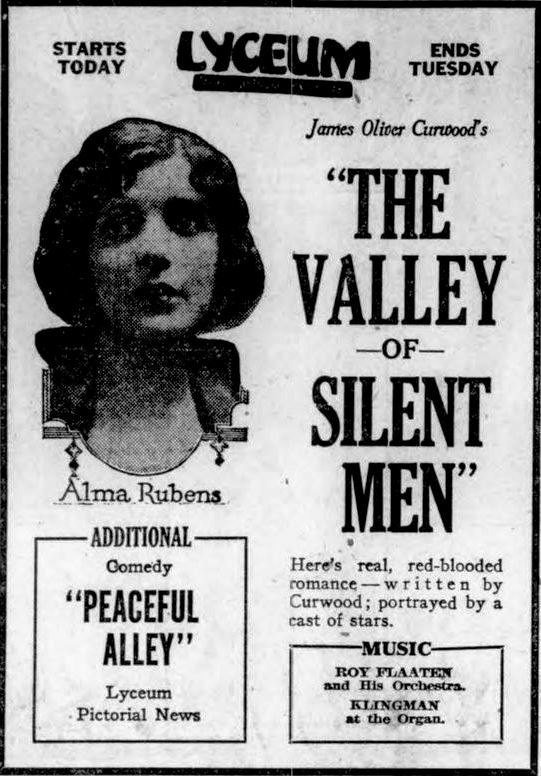
Newspaper ad for the American film The Valley of Silent Men, 1922

Until 1927, all movies were silent. The actors were skilled in pantomime, gestures, and facial expressions, but no recorded talking or lines were included in the movies. The only words that signaled actions or lines to the viewer were written on title cards. Title cards would pop up when important plot developments needed to be cleared up, or specific lines were supposed to be included. However, despite the lack of spoken word, there was often music and sound effects added after the fact. In order to add music to the movie, pianists, organists, and orchestras would accompany the film. Because of this, American silent films were often able to be shown universally and the same story would be communicated to most audiences, regardless of their language. Another key feature of silent films was the speed—on average, the film reels were sped up by about four times the usual speed. This was done in order to make time for a matinee as well as an evening show in theaters.

=== Silent film stars ===
Beauty was highly appreciated in this era of film, and the stars of the industry reflected this. Despite the floating ideals of whiteness in America, many Hispanic men and women shared in this iconic era of beauty. In fact, the contribution of Hispanic Americans to the movie industry was highly important. For example, when Roman Novarro starred in Metro-Goldwyn-Mayer's production of Ben Hur: Tale of the Christ in 1925, the company was saved from bankruptcy due to his popularity and skill. However, even though they were successful in the film industry, most Hispanic actors were relegated to three main stereotypes on screen (although some were able to take on "white" roles): the greaser, the Latin lover, or the dark seductress. Hollywood loved on-screen couples as well—they were marketable and romantic. One such couple, Janet Gaynor and Charles Farrell, starred together in 12 films and were dubbed "America's sweethearts".

=== Talkies ===
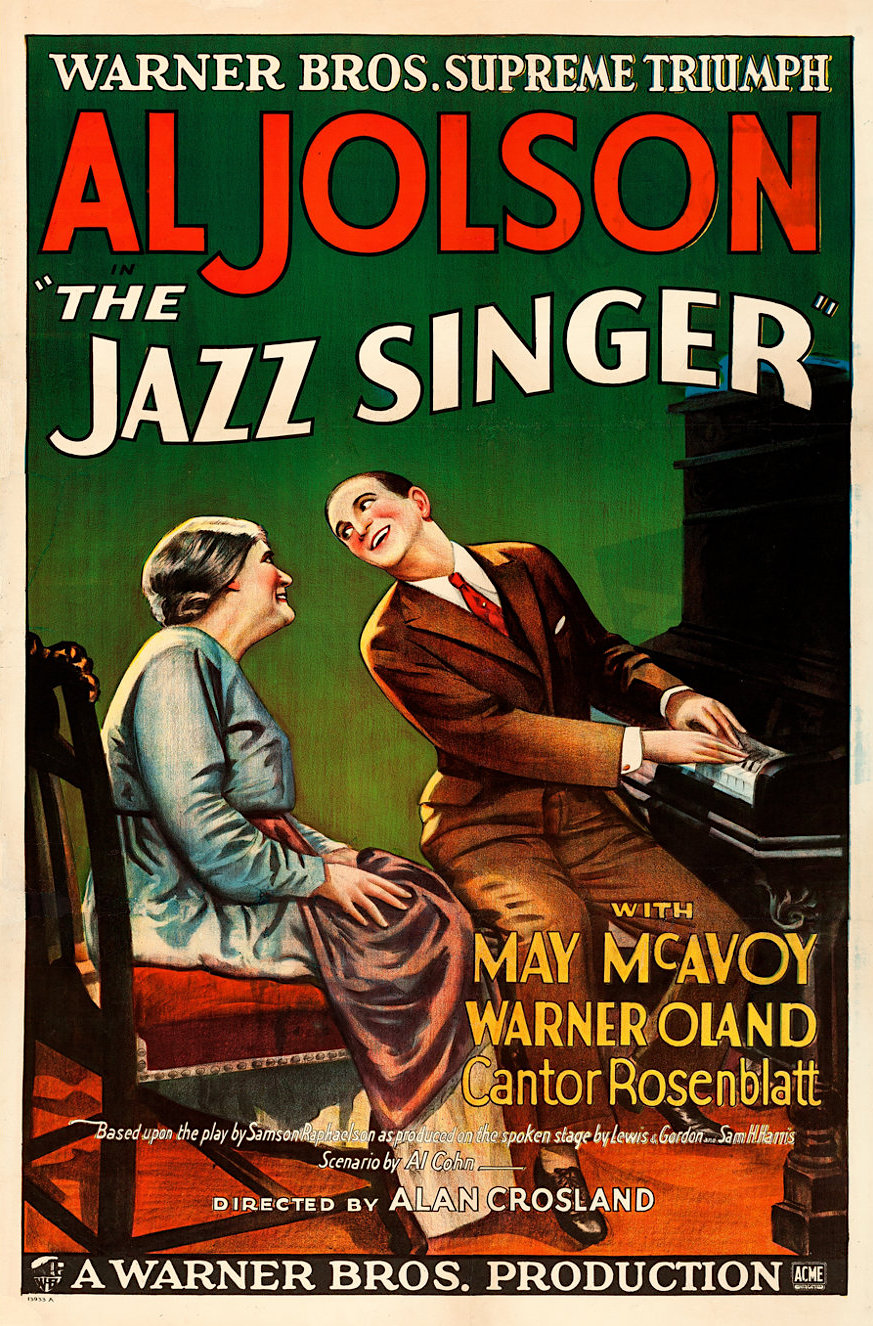
Poster for the movie The Jazz Singer, 1927

The first film including synchronized sound and audible lines was The Jazz Singer in 1927. Many of the talking films in the twenties revolved around Broadway in plot and theme. At the end of the decade, movie musicals were popular, especially in 1929, since they took special advantage of the addition of sound by having singing. Some prominent examples of movie musicals from this time were Broadway, Gold Diggers of Broadway, and The Hollywood Revue of 1929. Most big film companies took advantage of the increasing popularity of movie musicals until 1930, when they were deemed too expensive and impractical to continue mass-producing.

=== Issues with sound ===
When sound was first introduced, there were a number of complications. First of all, most of the famous actors from the Silent Era, who were primarily pantomimes, had untrained voices and were incapable of expressing the necessary emotions with the addition of words. This voice struggle led to the end of many previously successful acting careers. Some had voices that were not compatible with the microphones, some had voices that were too high, too husky, or too soft, and some could not act convincingly. Because of this, many companies began to hire a higher number of "theater" actors, who were familiar with using their voices. Along with actors, film studios began to hire playwrights to write scripts, as the new addition of lines was a struggle for some filmmakers. In fact, many of the first talking films were just filmed adaptations of previously existing stage plays. Additionally, movie studios had to spend hundreds of thousands of dollars on new sound equipment or on soundproofing certain rooms. This new equipment, though innovative, was difficult to work with at times. The microphones were large and sensitive to movement, so they were typically placed strategically within props and set pieces that the actor would be next to during certain lines of dialogue, which was often difficult to work with. Moving the cameras also proved to be fairly noisy and was picked up on the recordings. To remedy this, many studios started practicing the "frozen camera" technique, where cameras were placed in a soundproof room and recorded through the glass, with a wide shot so it would not have to pan or move.

=== Main companies ===
Within the film industry, there were several main companies, five of which were considered the "Big Five" and three of which were considered the "Little Three". Many of these companies exist still today. The Big Five consisted of Warner Brothers, Famous Players–Lasky Corporation (later Paramount Studios, 1927), Radio-Keith-Orpheum Pictures, Loew's, Inc. (later Metro-Goldwyn-Mayer), and Fox Film Corporation. The Little Three consisted of Universal Pictures, United Artists, and Columbia Pictures.

== See also ==
- Jazz
- Vaudeville
- Legitimate theater
- Cinema of the United States
- Theater in the United States
- The Public Theater
