= Superstitions (advertising campaign) =

"Superstitions" is an advertising campaign for Anheuser-Busch's Bud Light that debuted for the 2012 season of the National Football League. It was followed by "Dilemmas" in the 2013 season. The campaigns include television commercials that depict the superstitions that fans believe to help their teams win. The tagline for the campaigns is "It’s Only Weird If It Doesn’t Work".

The 2012 season kicked off with the spot "Very Superstitious", included "Labels Out", and ended with two spots for the Super Bowl, "Lucky Chair" and "Journey". The rituals in "Very Superstitious" have been cited as an example of socially desirable superstitious behavior.

The 2013 season kicked off with "Quinoa" and followed up with "Ramsey", "Basement", and "Jukebox".
