= Nathaniel Bannister =

American playwright

- Born: Nathaniel Harrington Bannister; January 13, 1813; Delaware, United States
- Died: November 2, 1847 (aged 34); New York City, New York, United States
- Occupations: Actor and playwright
- Spouse: Amelia Greene Legge
- Writing career
- Language: English

Nathaniel Harrington Bannister (January 13, 1813 – November 2, 1847) was an American actor and playwright.

Bannister wrote over 40 plays, including Putnam, the Iron Son of '76 (1844) about the American Revolutionary War hero Israel Putnam which played for 78 consecutive nights in New York at the Bowery Theatre (produced by Thomas S. Hamblin), unusually successful for its time. The bulk of Bannister's many works, only some of which were published, are historical dramas.

Bannister was born in Delaware (some sources report Maryland) in 1813, and made his first appearance on stage in Baltimore at age 16 in the role of Young Norval. He died in poverty in New York on November 2, 1847.

Bannister was married to actress Amelia Greene, who was previously married to John Augustus Stone.

== Plays (incomplete list) ==
- Rathanemus (1835, New Orleans)
- Gaulantus the Gault (1836)
- The Destruction of Jerusalem (1837)
- England's Iron Days (1837)
- The Gentleman of Lyons, or the Marriage Contract (1837)
- The Maine Question (1839)
- Titus Andronicus (1839, adaptation)
- Old English Ironsides
- Robert Emmett
- Murrell, the Land Pirate
- Roman Slaves
- Two Spaniards
- Caius Silius
- Psammetichus, or the Twelve Tribes of Egypt (written for Edwin Forrest)
- The Wandering Jew
- Washington
- Infidelity
- Gustavani
- The Fall of San Antonio
- Tis Freedom's Call
- Adventures of a Sailor
- The Serpent's Glen
- The Midnight Murder
- Surrender of Lord Cornwallis
- Chief of the McIvor
- Texas and Freedom
- Life in New Orleans
- The Three Brothers: Or Crime Its Own Avenger (one act)
- Putnam, the Iron Son of '76 (1844)

== See also ==
- List of playwrights
- List of people from Delaware
