= Putnam, the Iron Son of '76 =

American play

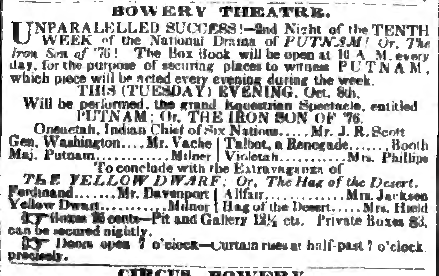
- Advertisement noting the "unparalleled success" of Putnam, in October 8, 1844 Morning Courier and New-York Enquirer
- Written by: Nathaniel Bannister
- Original language: English

Premiere
- Date premiered: 5 August 1844
- Place premiered: Bowery Theatre

Putnam, the Iron Son of '76 is an 1844 American play by Nathaniel Bannister, and his most popular play.

The play is about American Revolutionary War hero Israel Putnam. Starting on August 5, 1844, it played for 78 consecutive nights (not counting Sundays) in New York at the Bowery Theatre, produced by Thomas S. Hamblin, an astounding success for its time, and likely the longest New York run of its time. It featured the live horse "Black Vulture", which was a big audience draw. It enjoyed revivals for years, and was also performed in other cities.

== Original New York cast ==
- Oneactah by John R. Scott
- Major Putnam by George Milner
- General Washington by William Alexander Vache
- General Cadwallader by Mr. Reeve
- General Greene by Mr. Jackson
- Major Sapling by E.L. Davenport
- Starkham by Thomas Hadaway
- William by Mr. Sutherland
- Lord Cornwallis by Mr. Fleming
- Lord Rawdon by Mr. Lewis
- Talbot, the Renegade by Junius Brutus Booth Jr.
- Indian Boy by Mr. Yeoman
- Kate Putnam by Mrs. Sutherland
- Therese by Mrs. McCluskey
- Mrs. Starkham by Mrs. Stickney
- Violetah by Mrs. Phillips
