= Miracle match =

Miracle match or miracle game are terms sometimes used to refer to sporting events with highly unexpected outcomes (a significant upset) or very dramatic finishes. The term may refer to one of the following:

== Film and literature ==
- Miracle (2004 film), a film about the United States men's ice hockey team at the 1980 Winter Olympics
- Miracle on Ice (1981 film), an earlier film about the same topic
- The Miracle Game, a 1972 Czech novel by Josef Škvorecký
- The Miracle Match, an alternate title for The Game of Their Lives (2005 film) about the 1950 FIFA World Cup victory of the United States over England
- The Miracle Season, a 2018 film about an American high school volleyball team following the 2011 sudden death of its team captain

== Sports ==
Note: a "miracle" name can refer to an entire game, its defining play, or both.

=== American football ===
==== College ====
- Bluegrass Miracle, the 74-yard game-winning pass in a 2002 game between the LSU Tigers and Kentucky Wildcats
- Miracle Bowl, the 1980 Holiday Bowl, a bowl game between the SMU Mustangs and BYU Cougars
- Miracle at Michigan, the final play in the 1994 game between the Colorado Buffaloes and Michigan Wolverines
- Miracle in Miami, also known as Hail Flutie, the 1984 game between the Boston College Eagles and Miami Hurricanes
- Mississippi Miracle, the final play in the 2007 Trinity vs. Millsaps football game

==== Professional ====
- Mile High Miracle, a 2013 Baltimore Ravens–Denver Broncos 2013 NFL playoff game
- Minneapolis Miracle, a 2018 Minnesota Vikings–New Orleans Saints NFL playoff game
- Miracle at the Meadowlands, a 1978 Philadelphia Eagles–New York Giants NFL game
- Miracle at the Met, a 1980 Minnesota Vikings–Cleveland Browns NFL game
- Miracle at the New Meadowlands, a 2010 Philadelphia Eagles–New York Giants NFL game
- Miracle in Miami, a 2018 Miami Dolphins–New England Patriots NFL game
- Miracle in Motown, a 2015 Green Bay Packers–Detroit Lions NFL game
- Monday Night Miracle (American football), a 2000 New York Jets–Miami Dolphins NFL game
- Monday Night Miracle, a 2005 Washington Redskins–Dallas Cowboys NFL game
- Music City Miracle, a 2000 Tennessee Titans–Buffalo Bills NFL playoff game

=== Australian rules football ===
- Miracle Match (Australian rules football), a 1963 match between the Fitzroy Lions and Geelong Cats
- Miracle on Grass (Australian rules football), a 2013 match between the Brisbane Lions and Geelong Cats

=== Baseball ===
- The Miracle of Coogan's Bluff, the game-winning home run scored by Bobby Thomson of the New York Giants against the Brooklyn Dodgers on October 3, 1951

=== Ice hockey ===
- Miracle on Ice, a 1980 Winter Olympics game between the United States and the Soviet Union
- Miracle on Manchester, a 1982 Los Angeles Kings–Edmonton Oilers NHL postseason game
- The Monday Night Miracle (ice hockey), a 1986 Calgary Flames–St. Louis Blues NHL postseason game
