= Miracle Mile =

Miracle Mile may refer to:

== Places ==
- Columbia Street (New Westminster), a street in New Westminster, British Columbia nicknamed the Miracle Mile.
- Miracle Mile, Los Angeles, California, a district of Los Angeles
- Miracle Mile (Coral Gables), a shopping area in Coral Gables, Florida
- Miracle Mile (Manhasset), New York, a premium shopping district on the North Shore of Long Island
- Miracle Mile Shops in the Planet Hollywood Resort and Casino in Las Vegas, Nevada
- Miracle Mile, a shopping area in Stockton, California
- Miracle Mile, a shopping area in St. Louis Park, Minnesota
- Miracle Mile Road, the southernmost alignment of Arizona State Route 77
  - Miracle Mile Historic District, Tucson, Arizona
- "Miracle Mile", Red Hill Avenue, connecting San Rafael and San Anselmo, California

== Music ==
=== Albums ===
- Miracle Mile (Guardian album), 1993
- Miracle Mile (Latch Key Kid album), 2008
- Miracle Mile (Strfkr album), 2013
- Miracle Mile (Wayne Horvitz album), 1992
- Miracle Mile (soundtrack), by Tangerine Dream, from the 1988 film (see below)
- The Miracle Mile, by Kevin Hearn and Thin Buckle, 2006

=== Songs ===
- "Miracle Mile" (song), by Cold War Kids, 2013
- "Miracle Mile", by Down with Webster from Down with Webster
- "Miracle Mile", by Icehouse from Code Blue
- "Miracle Mile", by Soul Asylum from While You Were Out

== Other uses ==
- Miracle Mile (film), a 1988 apocalyptic thriller cult film
- Miracle Mile Pace, an annual harness race in Sydney, New South Wales, Australia
- The Miracle Mile (athletics race), a race between Roger Bannister and John Landy at the 1954 British Empire and Commonwealth Games

== See also ==
- Magnificent Mile, a neighborhood in Chicago, Illinois, US
- Millionaires' Mile, an informal name given to exclusive residential neighborhoods of various cities
