= Monday Night Miracle (ice hockey) =

1986 hockey game

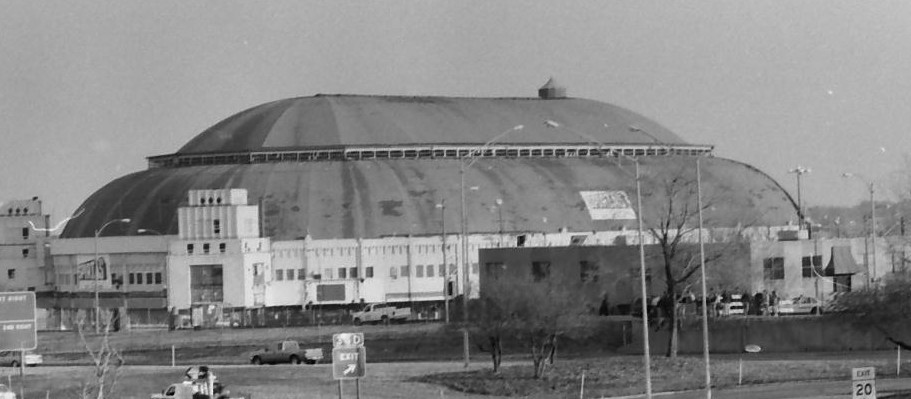
- The St. Louis Arena, where the game took place.
	1	2	3	OT	Total
Calgary Flames	0	4	1	0	5
St. Louis Blues	0	1	4	1	6
- Date: May 12, 1986
- Arena: St. Louis Arena
- City: St. Louis
- Attendance: 17,801

The Monday Night Miracle is a term used to describe the National Hockey League playoff game between the Calgary Flames and the St. Louis Blues that occurred on May 12, 1986. The Blues overcame a three-goal deficit with 12:00 remaining in the third period, and eventually won the game in overtime on a Doug Wickenheiser goal.

== Before the Game ==
The St. Louis Blues finished the 1985–86 NHL season in third place in the Norris Division with 37–34–9 record for 83 points. In the playoffs, the Blues defeated the Minnesota North Stars in the Norris Division semifinals, then pulled out a 4–3 series win against the Toronto Maple Leafs to earn the Norris Division title and advanced to the Campbell Conference finals.

The Calgary Flames finished the 1985–86 NHL season in second place in the Smythe Division with a 40–31–9 record for 89 points. In the playoffs, the Flames defeated the Winnipeg Jets in the Smythe Division semifinals, then pulled out a 4–3 series upset against the heavily-favored and provincial rival, the Edmonton Oilers in the Smythe Division final to end the Oilers' hopes of winning a third consecutive championship.

As a result, the Blues and Flames met in the Campbell Conference finals in an unlikely series. At stake was a berth to the 1986 Stanley Cup Final. The teams split the first four games of the series, with the Flames winning game five at home on May 10 to push St. Louis to the brink of elimination. This set the stage for game six two days later on the Blues' home ice in the St. Louis Arena.

== Monday Night Miracle ==
Ken Wilson had the announcing duties for the local St. Louis and ESPN television broadcast of the game (the Blues regular television broadcaster, Dan Kelly, was calling the series for CTV in Canada), and he watched Calgary build a 4–1 lead. St. Louis scored their second goal of the game with about 15 seconds remaining in a 5-on-3 powerplay goal by Doug Wickenheiser, only to have that momentum temporarily stifled as Joe Mullen answered by scoring Calgary's fifth goal of the game. The Blues subsequently found themselves trailing 5–2 at home with 12 minutes remaining in the third period. The Blues began their rally when Brian Sutter scored off a deflection off Calgary goalie Mike Vernon, and the 5–3 score carried down to eight minutes remaining in the game. Greg Paslawski was the next Blues player to score, making the score 5–4. Amid an electric atmosphere and impending sense of upset, broadcaster Wilson commented on the Blues:

The St. Louis Blues have been in this game what they have been all season and throughout the playoffs; an underdog. They've called this club a lunch-bucket team. They're blue-collar, hard workers. They don't have the talent of other teams; they know it.

— Ken Wilson, May 12, 1986

Unfortunately for the Blues, the clock dipped under two minutes remaining in the game as they still searched for the game-tying goal. With only 1:17 remaining in the game, the Blues shot the puck behind Calgary's net from the neutral zone. As Calgary defenseman Jamie Macoun brought the puck from behind the net, he didn't notice that Paslawski was right behind him. Stealing the puck at the side of the net, Paslawski flung a quick shot from a terrible angle that caught goalie Mike Vernon off guard. The puck went in the net, and with near-pandemonium in the Arena, the Blues burned the remaining time on the clock to force overtime.

=== Overtime ===
Overtime quickly became another heart-racing experience in itself, as players like Calgary's Al MacInnis and the Blues' Doug Wickenheiser took shots at the net. Calgary then came within inches of winning when Joe Mullen took a slapshot from just inside the blue line that hit off the goalpost. A short time after that near-miss, and with future Blues franchise player Brett Hull watching from the press box as a member of the Calgary Flames, announcer Wilson called what many consider the greatest moment in St. Louis Blues history:

Here's Ramage, for Federko too far, Federko steals the puck from Reinheart, over to Hunter who shoots, blocked, Wickenheiser scores! Doug Wickenheiser! The Blues pull it off and it's unbelievable!

— Ken Wilson, May 12, 1986

The goal came after 7:30 had already passed in the overtime period. It is considered to be one of the most memorable victories in Blues history.

== Aftermath ==
Wickenheiser's overtime goal set off the crowd at the Arena, a mass of cheering and celebration that continued well after both teams had left the ice. St. Louis couldn't rest on their laurels though, as they still faced an uphill battle by having to play Game 7 on Calgary's home ice, the Olympic Saddledome, two days later. St. Louis made things interesting, but lost game seven by the score of 2–1. Wickenheiser died from multiple forms of cancer at the age of 37 on January 12, 1999.

On March 7, 1988, both teams made a notable trade in which Rick Wamsley and Rob Ramage went to the Flames while Brett Hull and Steve Bozek went to the Blues. On September 6, 1988, the Blues traded Doug Gilmour, Mark Hunter, Bozek, and Michael Dark were sent to Calgary in exchange for Mike Bullard, Craig Coxe, and Tim Corkery. Bozek was later traded to the Vancouver Canucks the same day. This trade was beneficial to both teams as Gilmour, M. Hunter, Ramage, and Wamsley were on the team when Calgary won the 1989 Stanley Cup while Hull became the Blues's all-time goal scorer with 594 goals, including playoffs and single-season goal scorer with 86.
