= Superstition (play) =

1824 play by James Nelson Barker

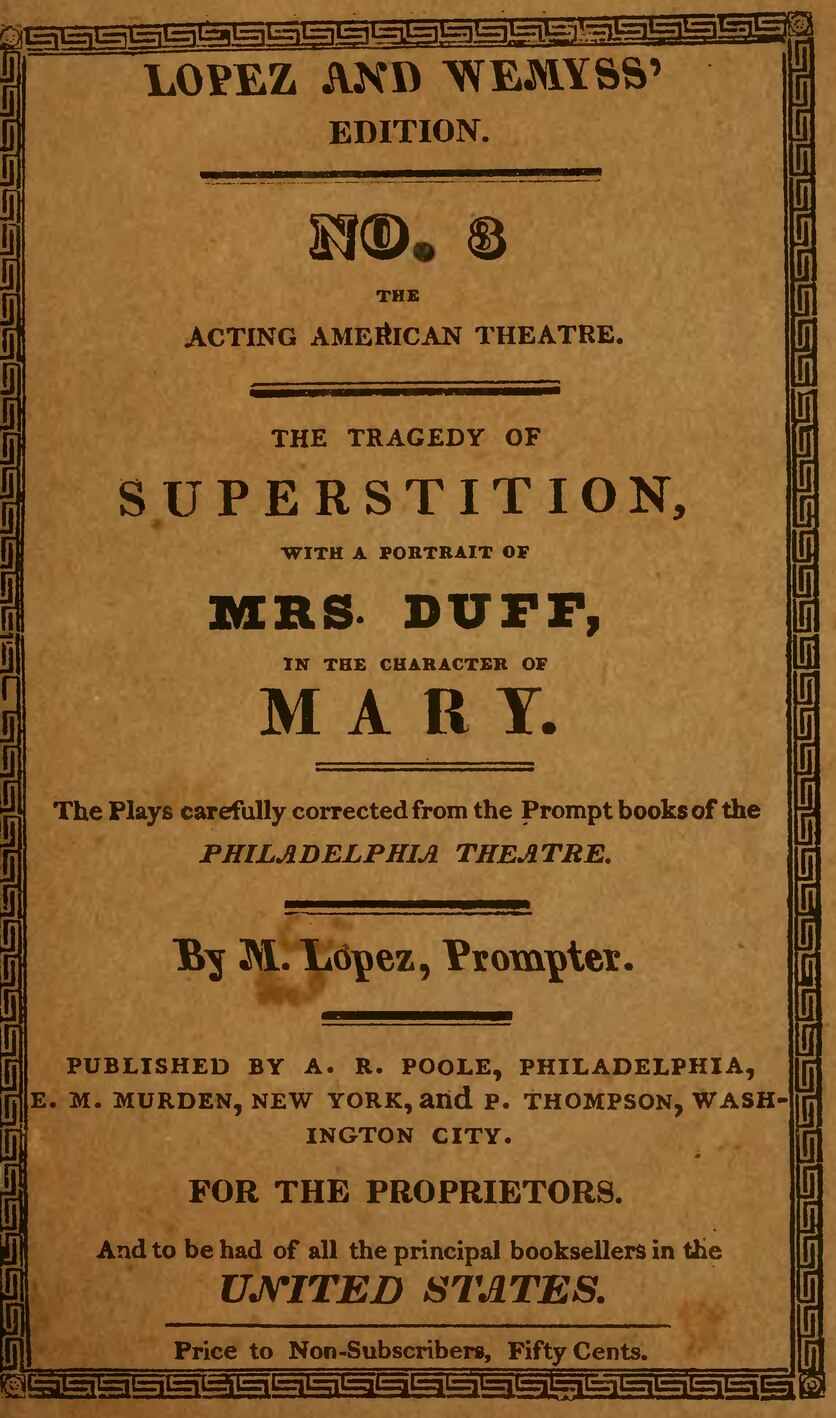
Title page of Superstition; or, the Fanatic Father by James Nelson Barker.

The Tragedy of Superstition; or, the Fanatic Father, is a straight play by James Nelson Barker set in a Puritan village in Colonial America, specifically in "New England, about the year 1675." Although feeling much like a melodrama, Barker himself identifies the play as a tragedy in the title. Barker tells in his preface to the play that main incidents of the play are said to have actually occurred in New England in the late 1600s. The play revolves around the hero Charles and the villain Reverend Ravensworth. Ravensworth persecutes Charles and his mother on the claims that they are practicing magic. Unlike a traditional melodrama, in which poetic justice prevails, Charles is executed at the end of the play, his mother dies at the sight of her murdered son, and Ravensworth's daughter dies of grief because of the love she had for Charles. It might be easy to miss that Reginald at the very end reveals his mission, which was to pardon Isabella's father, the Unknown, for his part in killing King Charles I, but in doing so reveals that the king had secretly married Isabella ("espoused"), meaning that her son Charles was the son of the King.

The play critiques tyrannous styles of power, in this case by a religious leader, especially ones that use fear of a supposed "Other" to consolidate and maintain power. The tragedy was first performed on March 12, 1824 at the Chestnut Street Theatre in Philadelphia.

== Background ==
Barker was a groundbreaking playwright because of the sense of patriotism he brought to his works. In the preface of another of his plays, Barker laments that American audiences at the time still expected plays to "lisp the language of Shakespere". Barker's playwriting style is intentionally unlike English plays at the time. His plays are uniquely American in style.

Beyond just the style of play, Barker chiefly wrote plays set in America and about American problems. One example of this is in his play The Indian Princess, one of the first Pocahontas stories in American culture. Superstition is another example of America-centered plays. One of the characters, called "the Unknown" represents William Goffe, who was the regicide of Charles I, as well helping rally the people of this village against the Native Americans as they're about to be attacked. Although the Unknown is certainly not the main character of Superstition, he is central to the plot and represents American ideals.

== Character List ==
=== Men ===
- Sir Reginald Egerton, from London
- George Egerton, from London
- Reverend Ravensworth

=== Women ===
- Isabella, Charles' mother
- Mary, Ravensworth's daughter
- Alice, Mary's friend and Walford's daughter
- Lucy, Isabella's servant
- Villagers

== Plot Synopsis ==
=== Act I ===
The play begins with Ravensworth’s daughter Mary talking with her friend Alice. Mary reveals to Alice that she is in love with Charles Fitzroy, who will soon be returning to the town after he was kicked out of school for being falsely accused of attempting to rob another boy in the town. She also tells that her father, Rev. Ravensworth, had become a bitter old man once her mother/his wife died. Ravensworth has a discussion with Mary in which he vehemently forbids any relationship between her and Charles. Ravensworth expresses to Walford his distrust of Charles and of his mother, Isabella, who came to the town years ago. Ravensworth believes that Charles and Isabella are practicing witchcraft, but Walford disagrees. The scene shifts to Sir Reginald and his nephew George Egerton, who are both from London. They reveal that they have come to America to find the man who killed King Charles I of England.

=== Act II ===
The second act opens with a mysterious man called “the Unknown,” who lives in the forest away from civilization. The Unknown meets Charles Fitzroy in the forest as Charles makes his way back from school where he's been expelled on trumped-up charges. This is the first time Charles appears in the play. After a discussion about Charles' origins, the Unknown agrees to help him get back to town. The scene shifts back to George and Sir Reginald hunting in the woods. They express their preference for London, and George especially remarks his disdain for America, particularly their rules of propriety. He laments the loss of revelry he could be having if he were in London. They encounter Mary in the forest and both attempt to win her favor. George especially tries to use his city sensibilities to impress Mary, but she is not “sophisticated” enough to understand him. George becomes increasingly forward and possibly physical in his flirtations, which scares Mary. Luckily, Charles enters, saves Mary, and George challenges him to a duel.

=== Act III ===
Charles and George secretly duel. This results in Charles wounding George, and George admits Charles' superiority, even declaring him a “gentleman and christian” to Sir Reginald later in the scene. Meanwhile, the colony is attacked by a tribe of Native Americans, but they are saved by the Unknown in a fictional depiction of Goffe’s leadership described above. Isabella prays during the attack, but Ravensworth misinterprets this as her casting a spell. He blames Isabella for causing the attack and says the Unknown is a devil.

=== Act IV ===
Isabella and Charles discuss their options, with Isabella wanting to leave town immediately, as Ravensworth becomes more of a threat to them. Isabella reveals that she became pregnant with Charles with a man of high status and seems to imply that he coerced her into having sex with him, but she refuses to tell Charles who his father is. Though this upsets Charles, he leaves to go find Mary. Charles and Mary meet in the forest with plans to run away, but Ravensworth finds them. To cover her tracks, Mary acts like Charles was attacking her. This is reminiscent of the original crime for which Charles was falsely accused. Both Isabella and Charles are arrested.

=== Act V ===
A trial swiftly follows in the fifth act, resulting in Charles and Isabella’s conviction of the supposed crimes of witchcraft and, in Charles’ case, attempted rape. Charles is taken offstage, at which time Sir Reginald and George enter and reveal that they had been sent to find the man who had killed King Charles I to give him a pardon. The Unknown enters and reveals himself to Isabella as her father, and he tells her he now knows the truth of what happened to her and forgives her. Charles is executed offstage, and Isabella dies after seeing her murdered son; Mary also dies after seeing the love of her life dead in his coffin. Ravensworth lives only to contemplate the destruction he has caused, including his own daughter's death.

== Analysis ==
=== The Pastoral Ideal ===
The pastoral ideal was a central cornerstone to the Romanticism movement which held the belief that nature, and those close to nature, are both didactic and self-actualized. According to John Crowley in “James Nelson Barker in Perspective,” the pastoral ideal is “a literary expression of a social locus between complex civilization and nature." Superstition's character that represents this mode of literature best is The Unknown. At the beginning of Act II, the parentheticals describe The Unknown as, "His dress is of Skins: his general appearance, wild—but his air and manner dignified." The Unknown is neither a Native American "savage" nor a high-minded European aristocrat. He is close to nature, but he still follows a simple code of ethics and morals. This depiction of The Unknown is in stark contrast to the English character, George Egerton, who in Act I Scene I says about America, "Why, what a heathen region we have come to." The Unknown and the pastoral ideal are used by James Nelson Barker to exemplify a mature, enlightened America.

=== Depictions of Native Americans ===
Even though the Native American raid is an essential plot point in Act III, Superstition never actually depicts any Native American characters. This is likely because James Nelson Barker, and like many of his contemporaries of the early 19th-century, viewed Native Americans as savages on a sub-human level. Barker distinguished Native Americans into two categories, "noble" and "ignoble" savages. "Noble" savages were those like Pocahontas in his play The Indian Princess who helped white settlers, while “ignoble” savages did not. The lack of any on-stage depictions of Native Americans in Superstition suggest that Barker categorized them as "ignoble," and therefore not worthy of representation. They are simply an outside force wreaking havoc to a stable Puritan village. The Native American aggressors versus the "passive" Puritan settlers also suggest a racist sentiment established by early 19th-century American playwrights.

== Legacy ==
Much of the plot of Superstition is reminiscent of Arthur Miller's play The Crucible, which was written during the McCarthyist era of the Cold War. The Crucible, like Superstition, uses the Puritans of the Massachusetts Bay Colony as a critique of the social and political climate at the time. Puritan hypocrisy depicted in literature can be seen in other places, for example in Nathaniel Hawthorne's The Scarlet Letter.
