= 1985–86 NHL transactions =

The following is a list of all team-to-team transactions that have occurred in the National Hockey League during the 1985–86 NHL season. It lists what team each player has been traded to, signed by, or claimed by, and for which player(s) or draft pick(s), if applicable.

== Trades between teams ==
=== May ===
May 29, 1985	To Toronto Maple Leafs Don Edwards	To Calgary Flames future considerations^{1} (4th-rd pick - 1987 entry draft - # 70 - Tim Harris)
May 31, 1985	To Los Angeles Kings Dean Hopkins	To Edmonton Oilers future considerations
May 31, 1985	To Minnesota North Stars Paul Houck	To Edmonton Oilers Gilles Meloche

1. Trade completed on June 13, 1987. The considerations became an optional third or fourth-round pick (this pick) in 1987 NHL Entry Draft.

=== June ===
June 15, 1985	To Montreal Canadiens 1st-rd pick - 1985 entry draft (# 12 - Jose Charbonneau); 2nd-rd pick - 1985 entry draft (# 33 - Todd Richards); 4th-rd pick - 1985 entry draft (# 75 - Martin Desjardins); 5th-rd pick - 1985 entry draft (# 96 - Tom Sagissor); 6th-rd pick - 1985 entry draft (# 117 - Donald Dufresne)	To St. Louis Blues Mike Dark; Mark Hunter; 2nd-rd pick - 1985 entry draft (# 37 - Herb Raglan); 3rd-rd pick - 1985 entry draft (# 44 - Nelson Emerson); 5th-rd pick - 1985 entry draft (# 100 - (Dan Brooks); 6th-rd pick - 1985 entry draft (# 121 - Rick Burchill)
June 15, 1985	To Minnesota North Stars Kent Nilsson; 3rd-rd pick - 1986 entry draft (# 58 - Brad Turner)^{1}	To Calgary Flames 2nd-rd pick - 1985 entry draft (# 27 - Joe Nieuwendyk); 2nd-rd pick - 1987 entry draft (# 25 - Stephane Matteau)

1. Minnesota had the option of the third-round pick in 1986 or 1987 Entry Draft. They selected in the 1987 draft.

=== August ===
August 21, 1985	To Toronto Maple Leafs Brad Maxwell	To Quebec Nordiques John Anderson
August 26, 1985	To Montreal Canadiens Perry Ganchar	To St. Louis Blues Ron Flockhart
August 29, 1985	To New Jersey Devils Perry Anderson	To St. Louis Blues Rick Meagher; 12th-rd pick - 1986 entry draft (# 234 - Bill Butler)

=== September ===
September 9, 1985	To New Jersey Devils cash	To Buffalo Sabres Don Lever
September 9, 1985	To Minnesota North Stars Mats Hallin	To New York Islanders 7th-rd pick - 1986 entry draft (# 138 - Will Andersen)
September 9, 1985	To Los Angeles Kings Glen Currie	To Washington Capitals Daryl Evans
September 10, 1985	To Pittsburgh Penguins Dave Simpson	To New York Islanders future considerations
September 10, 1985	To Edmonton Oilers Tim Hrynewich; Marty McSorley future considerations^{1} (Craig Muni)	To Pittsburgh Penguins Gilles Meloche
September 16, 1985	To Buffalo Sabres cash	To Pittsburgh Penguins Ted Nolan
September 18, 1985	To Toronto Maple Leafs 2nd-rd pick - 1986 entry draft (# 36 - Darryl Shannon); 4th-rd pick - 1986 entry draft (# 69 - Kent Hulst)	To Montreal Canadiens Dominic Campedelli
September 19, 1985	To New Jersey Devils Mark Johnson	To St. Louis Blues Shawn Evans; 5th-rd pick - 1986 entry draft (# 87 - Mike Wolak)
September 30, 1985	To Montreal Canadiens cash	To St. Louis Blues Normand Baron

1. Trade completed on October 6, 1986.

=== October ===
October 2, 1985	To Quebec Nordiques Gilbert Delorme	To St. Louis Blues Bruce Bell
October 4, 1985	To Hartford Whalers rights to Tim Bothwell	To St. Louis Blues cash
October 4, 1985	To Pittsburgh Penguins Randy Cunneyworth	3 team trade with Edmonton Oilers and Buffalo Sabres
October 4, 1985	To Buffalo Sabres Pat Hughes	3 team trade with Edmonton Oilers and Pittsburgh Penguins
October 4, 1985	To Edmonton Oilers Mike Moller	3 team trade with Buffalo Sabres and Pittsburgh Penguins
October 7, 1985	To Toronto Maple Leafs Chris Kotsopoulos	To Hartford Whalers Stewart Gavin
October 7, 1985	To Montreal Canadiens cash	To St. Louis Blues rights to Ric Nattress
October 11, 1985	To Los Angeles Kings Paul Guay; 4th-rd pick - 1986 entry draft (PHI - # 83 - Mark Bar)^{1}	To Philadelphia Flyers Steve Seguin; 2nd-rd pick - 1986 entry draft (# 23 - Jukka Seppo)
October 11, 1985	To Toronto Maple Leafs Tom Fergus	To Boston Bruins Bill Derlago
October 14, 1985	To Quebec Nordiques 7th-rd pick - 1986 entry draft (# 134 - Mark Vermette)	To Winnipeg Jets Dan Bouchard
October 15, 1985	To Buffalo Sabres 3rd-rd pick - 1986 entry draft (# 56 - Kevin Kerr)	To Chicago Black Hawks Bob Sauve
October 20, 1985	To Quebec Nordiques Wayne Babych	To Pittsburgh Penguins future considerations
October 31, 1985	To Los Angeles Kings Bryan Erickson	To Washington Capitals Bruce Shoebottom

1. Philadelphia's fourth-round pick was re-acquired as the result of a trade on December 18, 1985 that sent Joe Paterson to Los Angeles in exchange for this pick.

=== November ===
November 14, 1985	To Boston Bruins Pat Riggin	To Washington Capitals Pete Peeters
November 15, 1985	To Minnesota North Stars Ed Lee	To Quebec Nordiques 6th-rd pick - 1986 entry draft (#117 - Scott White)
November 21, 1985	To Hartford Whalers Dave Babych	To Winnipeg Jets Ray Neufeld
November 27, 1985	To Quebec Nordiques Robert Picard	To Winnipeg Jets Mario Marois
November 29, 1985	To Minnesota North Stars Todd Bergen; Ed Hospodar	To Philadelphia Flyers Bo Berglund; Dave Richter

=== December ===
December 6, 1985	To Hartford Whalers Doug Jarvis	To Washington Capitals Jorgen Pettersson
December 6, 1985	To Los Angeles Kings Len Hachborn	To Philadelphia Flyers cash
December 9, 1985	To Minnesota North Stars 2nd-rd pick - 1986 entry draft (# 90 - Neil Wilkinson); 4th-rd pick - 1987 entry draft (# 73 - John Weisbrod)	To New York Rangers Roland Melanson
December 9, 1985	To Los Angeles Kings Grant Ledyard; Roland Melanson	To New York Rangers Brian MacLellan; 4th-rd pick - 1987 entry draft (# 69 - Mike Sullivan)
December 18, 1985	To Los Angeles Kings Joe Paterson	To Philadelphia Flyers 4th-rd pick - 1986 entry draft (# 83 - Mark Bar)
December 19, 1985	To Edmonton Oilers Mike Rogers	To New York Rangers Larry Melnyk; Todd Strueby
December 20, 1985	To Minnesota North Stars Don Barber; Marc Habscheid; Emanuel Viveiros	To Edmonton Oilers Don Biggs; Gord Sherven
December 26, 1985	To Detroit Red Wings Steve Richmond	To New York Rangers Mike McEwen
December 28, 1985	To Edmonton Oilers Bruce Eakin	To Detroit Red Wings Billy Carroll

=== January ===
January 16, 1986	To Quebec Nordiques Tony Stiles	To Calgary Flames Tom Thornbury
January 17, 1986	To Hartford Whalers Wayne Babych	To Quebec Nordiques Greg Malone
January 29, 1986	To Buffalo Sabres Brian Engblom; Doug Smith	To Los Angeles Kings Ken Baumgartner; Sean McKenna; Larry Playfair
January 31, 1986	To Boston Bruins Wade Campbell	To Winnipeg Jets Bill Derlago
January 31, 1986	To Montreal Canadiens Graham Herring; 5th-rd pick - 1986 entry draft (# 94 - Eric Aubertin)	To St. Louis Blues Kent Carlson

=== February ===
February 1, 1986	To Calgary Flames Terry Johnson; Joe Mullen; Rik Wilson	To St. Louis Blues Eddy Beers; Charlie Bourgeois; Gino Cavallini
February 3, 1986	To Hartford Whalers Bill Gardner	To Chicago Black Hawks 3rd-rd pick - 1987 entry draft (# 60 - Mike Dagenais)^{1}
February 6, 1986	To Quebec Nordiques Steve Patrick	To New York Rangers Wilf Paiement

1. Chicago had the option of the third-round pick in 1986 or 1987 Entry Draft. They selected in the 1987 draft.

=== March ===
- Trading Deadline: March 11, 1986

March 8, 1986	To Hartford Whalers John Anderson	To Quebec Nordiques Risto Siltanen
March 10, 1986	To Boston Bruins Reed Larson	To Detroit Red Wings Mike O'Connell
March 10, 1986	To Detroit Red Wings Darren Veitch	To Washington Capitals John Barrett; Greg Smith
March 10, 1986	To Washington Capitals 3rd-rd pick - 1986 entry draft (# 60 - Shawn Simpson)	To Quebec Nordiques Peter Andersson
March 11, 1986	To Hartford Whalers Mike McEwen	To New York Rangers Bob Crawford
March 11, 1986	To New Jersey Devils 12th-rd pick - 1986 entry draft (# 236 - Doug Kirton)	To Buffalo Sabres Phil Russell
March 11, 1986	To Boston Bruins Dwight Foster	To Detroit Red Wings Dave Donnelly
March 11, 1986	To Detroit Red Wings Doug Shedden	To Pittsburgh Penguins Ron Duguay
March 11, 1986	To Calgary Flames Nick Fotiu	To New York Rangers future considerations
March 11, 1986	To Calgary Flames John Tonelli	To New York Islanders Steve Konroyd; Richard Kromm
March 11, 1986	To New Jersey Devils 3rd-rd pick - 1986 entry draft (# 62 - Marc Laniel)	To Philadelphia Flyers Glenn Resch
March 11, 1986	To Calgary Flames Tom McMurchy	To Chicago Black Hawks Rik Wilson

=== April ===
April 22, 1986	To Buffalo Sabres 8th-rd pick - 1987 entry draft (# 153 - Tim Roberts) future considerations	To Los Angeles Kings 3rd-rd pick - 1987 entry draft (# 43 - Ross Wilson)

== Additional sources ==
- hockeydb.com - search for player and select "show trades"
- "NHL trades for 1985-1986". NHL Trade Tracker.
