= 1985–86 Calgary Flames season =

NHL team season

1985–86 Calgary Flames
- Campbell Conference champions
- Division: 2nd Smythe
- Conference: 2nd Campbell
- 1985–86 record: 40–31–9
- Home record: 23–11–6
- Road record: 17–20–3
- Goals for: 354
- Goals against: 315

Team information
- General manager: Cliff Fletcher
- Coach: Bob Johnson
- Captain: Lanny McDonald, Jim Peplinski, and Doug Risebrough
- Alternate captains: Vacant
- Arena: Olympic Saddledome
- Average attendance: 16,762

Team leaders
- Goals: Hakan Loob (31)
- Assists: Al MacInnis (57)
- Points: Dan Quinn (72)
- Penalty minutes: Tim Hunter (291)
- Wins: Rejean Lemelin (29)
- Goals against average: Mike Vernon (3.39)

The 1985–86 Calgary Flames season was the sixth season in Calgary and 14th for the Flames franchise in the National Hockey League (NHL). It was a banner season for the Flames, who overcame a franchise record eleven game losing streak to finish 2nd in the Smythe Division and captured the franchise's first Clarence S. Campbell Bowl as Campbell Conference champions. In doing so, they became the first Calgary team to reach the Stanley Cup Finals since the Calgary Tigers in 1923–24. The Flames season ended at the hands of the Montreal Canadiens, who defeated Calgary in five games in the final.

The season began with the departure of franchise leading scorer Kent Nilsson who was sent to the Minnesota North Stars in a trade. Rookie goaltender Mike Vernon emerged as the team's top goaltender and Joe Mullen was acquired in a major trade midway through the season. Gary Suter captured the Calder Memorial Trophy as the league's top rookie while also being named to the NHL All-Rookie Team. Additionally, Suter was the team's lone representative at the 1986 All-Star Game. Hakan Loob captured the Molson Cup.

The Flames upset the heavily favoured Edmonton Oilers in the Smythe Division final to end the Oilers' hopes of winning a third consecutive championship. The series winning goal was scored into his own net by Oilers rookie Steve Smith. As Smith collapsed to the ice, Flames players celebrated the difference maker in what would finish as a 3–2 Calgary win. Smith's error remains one of the most legendary blunders in hockey history.

== Regular season ==
The Flames began the year with a similar roster as finished the 1984–85 season, with one major exception. Kent Nilsson, the franchise's all-time leading scorer, was dealt to the Minnesota North Stars for two draft picks. Nilsson was viewed as a player with immense talent who ended each season as a perennial disappointment in the playoffs. Though he scored 99 points the season before, the Flames received few offers before agreeing to send him to Minnesota. As the deal provided no immediate help for the team, co-captain Doug Risebrough anticipated that 1985–86 would be a transitional year for the Flames and the loss of Nilsson might force the team to play a more defensive style when compared to the team that finished second in league scoring the year previous.

The season opened in Calgary with a game against the Winnipeg Jets, the team that eliminated the Flames in the first round of the previous spring's playoffs. It ended with an 8–3 victory for the Flames, but not before a bench-clearing brawl resulted in the ejection of five players. Calgary was one of the top teams in the league in the early going, standing third overall on December 10 with a 15–8–3 record.

Four nights later, they were defeated by the Vancouver Canucks, 4–3, and continued losing for nearly a month. After the Hartford Whalers handily defeated the Flames 9–1 on January 7, 1986, to send Calgary to its 11th consecutive defeat, a franchise record, coach Bob Johnson promised changes. Among them was the recall of goaltender Mike Vernon from the Moncton Golden Flames, who was given the start ahead of Rejean Lemelin in their next game, against Vancouver. He held the Flames in the game long enough for Jim Peplinski to score in the first minute of overtime for a 5–4 victory that ended the eighth-longest losing streak in NHL history.

During the losing streak, on December 29, the Flames hosted Soviet team Dynamo Moscow in an exhibition game as part of the 1986 Super Series. Vernon was given the start for the game to let Lemelin rest and led Calgary to a 4–3 victory over Dynamo. It was the Flames' second victory in three years against a Soviet league club, and came despite what the team considered biased officiating by the Russian referee working the game.

The team enjoyed greater success in the second half of the season, finishing the final 40 games with a record of 22–12–5. Vernon established himself as the starting goaltender by mid February and finished the regular season with only three losses in 15 decisions. The Flames ended the season in second place in the Smythe Division, sixth overall in the NHL, with 89 points. Seeking to upgrade the team's offence as the playoffs approached, general manager Cliff Fletcher completed a six-player trade with the St. Louis Blues that brought Joe Mullen, a player who had scored at least 40 goals each of his previous two seasons, to Calgary. A second deal in March had the Flames acquire four-time Stanley Cup champion John Tonelli from the New York Islanders and initiated a war of words with Edmonton Oilers general manager and coach Glen Sather, who accused Islanders general manager Bill Torrey of trying to help Fletcher eliminate the Oilers in the upcoming playoffs.

Smythe Division
	GP	W	L	T	GF	GA	Pts
**Edmonton Oilers**	80	56	17	7	426	310	119
**Calgary Flames**	80	40	31	9	354	315	89
**Winnipeg Jets**	80	26	47	7	295	372	59
**Vancouver Canucks**	80	23	44	13	282	333	59
Los Angeles Kings	80	23	49	8	284	389	54

Note: GP = Games played, W = Wins, L = Losses, T = Ties, Pts = Points, GF = Goals for, GA = Goals against
Note: Teams that qualified for the playoffs are highlighted in bold.

=== Record vs. opponents ===
Smythe Division record vs. opponents

==== Vs. Campbell Conference ====
**Vs. Smythe Division**

1985–86 NHL records
Team	**CGY**	**EDM**	**LAK**	**VAN**	**WIN**	**Total**
Calgary	—	1−6−1	7−1	4−2−2	6−1−1	**18−10−4**
Edmonton	6−1−1	—	6−0−2	7−0−1	6−2	**25−3−4**
Los Angeles	1−7	0−6−2	—	1−5−2	5−2−1	**7−20−5**
Vancouver	2−4−2	0−7−1	5−1−2	—	3−3−2	**10−15−7**
Winnipeg	1−6−1	2−6	2−5−1	3−3−2	—	**8−20−4**

**Vs. Norris Division**

1985–86 NHL records
Team	**CHI**	**DET**	**MIN**	**STL**	**TOR**	**Total**
Calgary	1−2	2−0−1	0−2−1	1−2	2−1	**6−7−2**
Edmonton	3−0	3−0	2−1	1−1−1	2−1	**11−3−1**
Los Angeles	0−1−2	1−2	2−1	1−1−1	2−1	**6−6−3**
Vancouver	0−3	3−0	2−1	0−3	2−0−1	**7−7−1**
Winnipeg	1−2	3−0	2−1	1−2	1−1−1	**8−6−1**

**Vs. Wales Conference**

**Vs. Adams Division**

1985–86 NHL records
Team	**BOS**	**BUF**	**HFD**	**MTL**	**QUE**	**Total**
Calgary	1−2	1−1−1	1−2	1−2	1−2	**5−9−1**
Edmonton	2−1	1−2	3−0	3−0	2−1	**11−4−0**
Los Angeles	0−3	2−1	1−2	1−2	1−2	**5−10−0**
Vancouver	0−1−2	1−2	0−3	0−3	1−1−1	**2−10−3**
Winnipeg	0−3	1−2	1−2	1−2	2−1	**5−10−0**

**Vs. Patrick Division**

1985–86 NHL records
Team	**NJD**	**NYI**	**NYR**	**PHI**	**PIT**	**WSH**	**Total**
Calgary	2−0−1	1−1−1	2−1	1−2	2−1	3−0	**11−5−2**
Edmonton	3−0	1−0−2	1−2	2−1	2−1	0−3	**9−7−2**
Los Angeles	1−2	1−2	1−2	0−3	1−2	1−2	**5−13−0**
Vancouver	1−2	1−1−1	0−3	1−2	1−2	0−2−1	**4−12−2**
Winnipeg	1−2	0−2−1	1−2	1−2	1−2	1−1−1	**5−11−2**

== Schedule and results ==
1985–86 regular season
October: 5–5–0 (home: 4–2–0; road: 1–3–0)

#	Date	Visitor	Score	Home	OT	Record	Points
1	October 11	Winnipeg	3 – 8	Calgary		1–0–0	2
2	October 13	Calgary	9 – 2	Los Angeles		2–0–0	4
3	October 16	St. Louis	2 – 1	Calgary		2–1–0	4
4	October 19	Boston	6 – 3	Calgary		2–2–0	4
5	October 20	Calgary	5 – 8	Winnipeg		2–3–0	4
6	October 23	Washington	2 – 4	Calgary		3–3–0	6
7	October 25	Calgary	3 – 5	Edmonton		3–4–0	6
8	October 26	Detroit	4 – 7	Calgary		4–4–0	8
9	October 28	Calgary	3 – 5	Edmonton		4–5–0	8
10	October 30	Buffalo	2 – 4	Calgary		5–5–0	10

November: 8–2–3 (home: 3–0–2; road: 5–2–1)

#	Date	Visitor	Score	Home	OT	Record	Points
11	November 2	Toronto	2 – 4	Calgary		6–5–0	12
12	November 5	Calgary	4 – 4	NY Islanders	OT	6–5–1	13
13	November 6	Calgary	5 – 2	New Jersey		7–5–1	15
14	November 9	Calgary	5 – 4	Washington		8–5–1	17
15	November 10	Calgary	1 – 5	Buffalo		8–6–1	17
16	November 13	Winnipeg	3 – 3	Calgary	OT	8–6–2	18
17	November 16	New Jersey	2 – 7	Calgary		9–6–2	20
18	November 17	Calgary	5 – 4	Winnipeg		10–6–2	22
19	November 19	Minnesota	3 – 3	Calgary	OT	10–6–3	23
20	November 23	Calgary	3 – 4	Montreal		10–7–3	23
21	November 26	Calgary	3 – 1	Quebec		11–7–3	25
22	November 27	Calgary	5 – 2	NY Rangers		12–7–3	27
23	November 30	NY Islanders	3 – 4	Calgary		13–7–3	29

December: 4–8–0 (home: 4–1–0; road: 0–7–0)

#	Date	Visitor	Score	Home	OT	Record	Points
24	December 1	Calgary	3 – 5	Edmonton		13–8–3	29
25	December 4	Hartford	5 – 8	Calgary		14–8–3	31
26	December 6	Chicago	2 – 5	Calgary		15–8–3	33
27	December 10	Los Angeles	5 – 6	Calgary		16–8–3	35
28	December 12	Los Angeles	0 – 5	Calgary		17–8–3	37
29	December 14	Calgary	3 – 4	Vancouver		17–9–3	37
30	December 17	Calgary	3 – 4	Pittsburgh		17–10–3	37
31	December 18	Calgary	3 – 4	Hartford		17–11–3	37
32	December 20	Calgary	2 – 5	St. Louis		17–12–3	37
33	December 22	Calgary	4 – 5	Chicago	OT	17–13–3	37
34	December 28	Philadelphia	6 – 5	Calgary		17–14–3	37
–	December 29	Dynamo Moscow	3 – 4	Calgary		Exhibition	
35	December 31	Calgary	3 – 6	Minnesota		17–15–3	37

January: 6–7–2 (home: 3–3–1; road: 3–4–1)

#	Date	Visitor	Score	Home	OT	Record	Points
36	January 2	Edmonton	4 – 3	Calgary		17–16–3	37
37	January 4	Montreal	6 – 5	Calgary		17–17–3	37
38	January 5	Calgary	3 – 6	Edmonton		17–18–3	37
39	January 7	Hartford	9 – 1	Calgary		17–19–3	37
40	January 9	Vancouver	4 – 5	Calgary	OT	18–19–3	39
41	January 12	Calgary	0 – 3	Philadelphia		18–20–3	39
42	January 14	Calgary	4 – 3	Washington		19–20–3	41
43	January 16	Calgary	2 – 3	Boston		19–21–3	41
44	January 18	Calgary	7 – 4	Detroit		20–21–3	43
45	January 19	Calgary	9 – 5	Toronto		21–21–3	45
46	January 22	New Jersey	6 – 6	Calgary	OT	21–21–4	46
47	January 25	Pittsburgh	2 – 5	Calgary		22–21–4	48
48	January 27	Los Angeles	3 – 6	Calgary		23–21–4	50
49	January 29	Calgary	4 – 4	Vancouver	OT	23–21–5	51
50	January 31	Calgary	4 – 7	Edmonton		23–22–5	51

February: 7–3–2 (home: 4–2–2; road: 3–1–0)

#	Date	Visitor	Score	Home	OT	Record	Points
51	February 1	Edmonton	4 – 4	Calgary	OT	23–22–6	52
52	February 6	Los Angeles	2 – 7	Calgary		24–22–6	54
53	February 9	Calgary	7 – 3	Los Angeles		25–22–6	56
54	February 12	Winnipeg	2 – 4	Calgary		26–22–6	58
55	February 14	Buffalo	3 – 3	Calgary	OT	26–22–7	59
56	February 16	Quebec	6 – 3	Calgary		26–23–7	59
57	February 18	Boston	4 – 7	Calgary		27–23–7	61
58	February 20	Toronto	7 – 6	Calgary	OT	27–24–7	61
59	February 21	Calgary	4 – 0	Vancouver		28–24–7	63
60	February 23	Calgary	2 – 6	Chicago		28–25–7	63
61	February 25	Calgary	4 – 1	St. Louis		29–25–7	65
62	February 27	Philadelphia	4 – 7	Calgary		30–25–7	67

March: 7–6–2 (home: 3–1–1; road: 4–5–1)

#	Date	Visitor	Score	Home	OT	Record	Points
63	March 1	Vancouver	2 – 3	Calgary		31–25–7	69
64	March 2	Calgary	5 – 1	Los Angeles		32–25–7	71
65	March 4	Pittsburgh	3 – 6	Calgary		33–25–7	73
66	March 6	NY Rangers	5 – 2	Calgary		33–26–7	73
67	March 9	Calgary	3 – 3	Detroit	OT	33–26–8	74
68	March 11	Calgary	4 – 8	NY Islanders		33–27–8	74
69	March 12	Calgary	3 – 2	NY Rangers		34–27–8	76
70	March 14	Calgary	2 – 6	Quebec		34–28–8	76
71	March 15	Calgary	5 – 3	Montreal		35–28–8	78
72	March 19	Calgary	5 – 6	Minnesota		35–29–8	78
73	March 21	Vancouver	5 – 5	Calgary	OT	35–29–9	79
74	March 23	Calgary	7 – 4	Winnipeg		36–29–9	81
75	March 26	Calgary	3 – 7	Los Angeles		36–30–9	81
76	March 28	Winnipeg	3 – 6	Calgary		37–30–9	83
77	March 30	Calgary	2 – 4	Vancouver		37–31–9	83

April: 3–0–0 (home: 2–0–0; road: 1–0–0)

#	Date	Visitor	Score	Home	OT	Record	Points
78	April 1	Vancouver	5 – 6	Calgary		38–31–9	85
79	April 4	Edmonton	3 – 9	Calgary		39–31–9	87
80	April 6	Calgary	6 – 4	Winnipeg		40–31–9	89

Legend: Win (2 points) Loss (0 points) Tie (1 point)

== Playoffs ==
The Flames began the 1986 Stanley Cup playoffs with a Smythe semi-final match-up against the Winnipeg Jets, the team that eliminated them in the first round the previous season. Calgary won the best-of-five series in three consecutive games, eliminating the Jets on a Lanny McDonald overtime goal in the third game. The victory set up a best-of-seven Smythe Division final against the two-time defending champion Edmonton Oilers who swept the Vancouver Canucks in the opening round. The Flames opened the series in Edmonton with a 4–1 victory, the first loss the Oilers had suffered on home ice in 18 playoff games.

The two teams traded victories through the first six games, leading to a deciding seventh game in Edmonton. The Flames stepped out to an early 2–0 lead before the Oilers tied it. Disaster then struck Edmonton at the 5:14 mark of the third period. Oilers' rookie defenceman Steve Smith, attempting to play the puck from behind his own goal line, accidentally shot the puck off Oilers goaltender Grant Fuhr's skate and into his own net. As Smith collapsed to the ice in shock, the Flames celebrated the goal that was ultimately credited to Perry Berezan. He was the last Flame to touch the puck, though he was no longer on the ice when it went in. The Oilers were unable to come back, losing the game, 3–2, series, 4–3, and ending their hopes of winning a third consecutive Stanley Cup. Smith's blunder remains one of the most legendary errors in NHL history.

The Campbell Conference Final against the St. Louis Blues was also a back and forth affair in which the Flames take a 3–2 series lead into the sixth game in St. Louis. Calgary led the sixth game 5–2 with 12 minutes to play before three quick goals by the Blues sent the game into overtime. Doug Wickenheiser scored to win the game for the Blues. The comeback came to be known as the Monday Night Miracle in St. Louis. The Flames rebounded in game seven, winning 2–1 to claim the first Clarence S. Campbell Bowl in franchise history as Campbell Conference champions. The victory also sent the Flames to their first Stanley Cup Final. It was the first time a team representing the city played in the final since the Calgary Tigers lost to the Montreal Canadiens in the 1924 Stanley Cup Final.

Their opponent in 1986 was also the Canadiens in what constituted the first all-Canadian final since 1967. Calgary opened the series with a 5–2 victory at home in the battle of rookie goaltenders: Vernon against Patrick Roy. Montreal evened the series with a 3–2 overtime victory in game two in which Brian Skrudland set an NHL record for the fastest overtime goal in playoff history when he scored nine seconds into the extra frame. Already missing three key players in Carey Wilson, Colin Patterson and Nick Fotiu due to injury, the Flames lost their top scorer in Joe Mullen to a neck injury during a game two loss. The Canadiens also won the third game as the series shifted to Montreal, and 1–0 Calgary loss in game four pushed the Flames to the brink of elimination. Montreal broke out to a 4–1 lead in the fifth game, at Calgary, before the Flames made a comeback attempt. They scored with less than four minutes remaining, and then moved within one goal when Mullen – who returned for game five wearing a neck brace – scored with 46 seconds remaining. A desperate push for the tying goal fell short when Roy made several key saves as time expired. Montreal celebrated the 23rd Stanley Cup championship in their franchise history as the fans loudly chanted "thank you Flames, thank you Flames" in appreciation of their team's efforts.

1986 Stanley Cup playoffs
Smythe Division Semifinal vs. Winnipeg – Flames win 3–0

Game	Date	Visitor	Score	Home	OT	Series
1	April 9	Winnipeg	1 – 5	Calgary		Calgary leads 1–0
2	April 10	Winnipeg	4 – 6	Calgary		Calgary leads 2–0
3	April 12	Calgary	4 – 3	Winnipeg	OT	Calgary wins 3–0

Smythe Division Final vs. Edmonton – Flames win 4–3

Game	Date	Visitor	Score	Home	OT	Series
1	April 18	Calgary	4 – 1	Edmonton		Calgary leads 1–0
2	April 20	Calgary	5 – 6	Edmonton	OT	Series tied 1–1
3	April 22	Edmonton	2 – 3	Calgary		Calgary leads 2–1
4	April 24	Edmonton	7 – 4	Calgary		Series tied 2–2
5	April 26	Calgary	4 – 1	Edmonton		Calgary leads 3–2
6	April 28	Edmonton	5 – 2	Calgary		Series tied 3–3
7	April 30	Calgary	3 – 2	Edmonton		Calgary wins 4–3

Campbell Conference Final vs. St. Louis – Flames win 4–3

Game	Date	Visitor	Score	Home	OT	Series
1	May 2	St. Louis	3 – 2	Calgary		St. Louis leads 1–0
2	May 4	St. Louis	2 – 8	Calgary		Series tied 1–1
3	May 6	Calgary	5 – 3	St. Louis		Calgary leads 2–1
4	May 8	Calgary	2 – 5	St. Louis		Series tied 2–2
5	May 10	St. Louis	2 – 4	Calgary		Calgary leads 3–2
6	May 12	Calgary	5 – 6	St. Louis	OT	Series tied 3–3
7	May 14	St. Louis	1 – 2	Calgary		Calgary wins 4–3

Stanley Cup Finals vs. Montreal – Canadiens win 4–1

Game	Date	Visitor	Score	Home	OT	Series
1	May 16	Montreal	2 – 5	Calgary		Calgary leads 1–0
2	May 18	Montreal	3 – 2	Calgary	OT	Series tied 1–1
3	May 20	Calgary	3 – 5	Montreal		Montreal leads 2–1
4	May 22	Calgary	0 – 1	Montreal		Montreal leads 3–1
5	May 24	Montreal	4 – 3	Calgary		Montreal wins 4–1

Legend: Win Loss

== Battle of Alberta ==
The Battle of Alberta dominated the Flames' focus late in the season as they continued to struggle against their provincial rival. The two-time defending champion Oilers were nearly unbeatable against Calgary, losing just five of 31 matchups over three years. Calgary's frustration against Edmonton was highlighted by a mid-season game where, after a large brawl that resulted in the ejection of five players from the game, Calgary's Doug Risebrough ended up in the penalty box with Marty McSorley's Oilers jersey. Risebrough shredded the jersey with his skates before tossing it back onto the ice. Oilers' coach Glen Sather, enraged by the act, called Risebrough "childish" and threatened to send him a $1000 bill to replace the sweater.

Realizing Calgary's path to the Stanley Cup would go through Edmonton, coach Bob Johnson devised a seven-point plan for beating the Oilers that focused on limiting Wayne Gretzky, Paul Coffey and Jari Kurri's creativity, limiting access to the left side of the ice where the Oilers' top stars liked to skate, leaving their physical players on the ice by not engaging them and utilizing Neil Sheehy and Colin Patterson in roles designed to frustrate the Oiler players. Johnson first utilized the strategy in a late season game that ended in a 4–4 tie. The Flames then defeated the Oilers 9–3 in their final regular season meeting, a game that ended with another brawl and accusations by both teams that the other was sending their goons out after talented players.

The rivalry extended into the stands in the second game of the Smythe Division final in Edmonton. During the game, trainer Bearcat Murray went into the stands to rescue his son Al, also a trainer for the Flames, and tore ligaments in his leg in the process. Al had gone into the stands in an attempt to retrieve Gary Suter's stick, which had been knocked into the crowd and was being hidden by Oiler fans. Fearing for his son's safety, Bearcat jumped into the fray himself, suffering the injury. While being wheeled into an ambulance, Murray blew kisses for the cameras. The incident caught the attention of a group of fans in Boston, who formed the "Bearcat Murray Fan Club", and began showing up at the Boston Garden wearing skull caps and oversized moustaches mimicking Murray's looks when the Flames played there. The Flames lost players on the ice during the physical series as well, as Carey Wilson required surgery to remove his spleen after he was "skewered" by Steve Smith, according to Johnson. Suter had his season ended after suffering torn ligaments in his knee following a low hit by Mark Messier.

When the seventh game ended in victory, Flames fans in both Calgary and at Northlands Coliseum in Edmonton spilled onto the streets in celebration. The "C of Red" was born in that playoff series as fans responded to a promotion to wear the colour with such enthusiasm that many stores across the city sold out of red clothing. The effect was most pronounced during games, where nearly every fan in the Saddledome was in red. The C of Red inspired the Winnipeg Jets to create their White Out the following year.

== Player statistics ==
=== Skaters ===
Note: GP = Games played; G = Goals; A = Assists; Pts = Points; PIM = Penalty minutes

		Regular season					Playoffs
Player	#	GP	G	A	Pts	PIM	GP	G	A	Pts	PIM
Dan Quinn	10	78	30	42	72	44	18	8	7	15	10
Lanny McDonald	9	80	28	43	71	44	22	11	7	18	30
Gary Suter	20	80	18	50	68	141	10	2	8	10	8
Al MacInnis	2	77	11	57	68	76	21	4	15	19	30
Hakan Loob	12	68	31	36	67	36	22	4	10	14	6
Joel Otto	29	79	25	34	59	188	22	5	10	15	80
Jim Peplinski	24	77	25	35	59	214	22	5	9	14	107
Carey Wilson	33	76	29	29	58	24	9	0	2	2	2
Steve Bozek	26	64	21	22	43	24	14	2	6	8	32
Doug Risebrough	8	62	15	28	43	169	22	7	9	16	38
Joe Mullen^{†}^{[A]}	7	29	16	22	38	11	21	12	7	19	4
Perry Berezan	21	55	12	21	33	39	8	1	1	2	6
Paul Reinhart	23	32	8	25	33	15	21	5	13	18	4
Jamie Macoun	34	77	11	21	32	81	22	1	6	7	23
Richard Kromm^{‡}	22	63	12	17	29	31	—	—	—	—	—
Colin Patterson	11	61	14	13	27	22	19	6	3	9	10
Steve Konroyd^{‡}	3	59	7	20	27	64	—	—	—	—	—
Eddy Beers	27	33	11	10	21	8	—	—	—	—	—
Neil Sheehy	5	65	2	16	18	271	22	0	2	2	79
Tim Hunter	19	66	8	7	15	291	19	0	3	3	108
Gino Cavallini^{‡}	6	27	7	7	14	26	—	—	—	—	—
Charlie Bourgeois^{‡}	28	29	5	5	10	128	—	—	—	—	—
Paul Baxter	4	47	4	3	7	194	13	0	1	1	55
John Tonelli^{†}	27	9	3	4	7	10	22	7	9	16	49
Terry Johnson^{†}	6	24	1	4	5	71	17	0	3	3	64
Rejean Lemelin	31	60	0	5	5	10	3	0	1	1	0
Yves Courteau	25	4	1	1	2	0	1	0	0	0	0
Brian Bradley	14	5	0	1	1	0	1	0	0	0	0
Nick Fotiu	22	9	0	1	1	21	11	0	1	1	34
Mike Vernon	30	18	0	1	1	4	21	0	1	1	0
Robin Bartell	15	1	0	0	0	0	6	0	0	0	16
Dale DeGray	28	1	0	0	0	0	—	—	—	—	—
Mark Lamb	16	1	0	0	0	0	—	—	—	—	—
Rik Wilson^{†}	32	2	0	0	0	0	—	—	—	—	—
Marc D'Amour	1	15	0	0	0	22	—	—	—	—	—
Mike Eaves^{[B]}	17	—	—	—	—	—	8	1	1	2	8
Brett Hull	16	—	—	—	—	—	2	0	0	0	0

^{A} Mullen scored 44 goals and 90 points combined between St. Louis and Calgary, both totals led the Flames over a full season.
^{B} Eaves came out of retirement May 4, 1986, to replace Carey Wilson, who was injured in the Stanley Cup playoffs.
^{†}Denotes player spent time with another team before joining Calgary. Stats reflect time with the Flames only.
^{‡}Traded mid-season.

=== Goaltenders ===
Note: GP = Games played; TOI = Time on ice (minutes); W = Wins; L = Losses; OT = Overtime/shootout losses; GA = Goals against; SO = Shutouts; GAA = Goals against average

		Regular season								Playoffs
Player	#	GP	TOI	W	L	T	GA	SO	GAA	GP	TOI	W	L	GA	SO	GAA
Mike Vernon	30	18	921	9	3	3	52	1	3.39	21	1229	12	9	60	0	2.93
Marc D'Amour	1	15	560	2	4	2	32	0	3.43
Rejean Lemelin	31	60	3369	29	24	4	229	1	4.08	3	109	0	1	7	0	3.85

== Awards and honours ==
Listed at five feet, nine inches tall by NHL Central Scouting, defenceman Gary Suter was considered too small for the NHL and went unselected at both the 1982 and 1983 NHL entry drafts. Suter moved on to the University of Wisconsin where Flames scouts noted that he had grown two inches and was a leading player for his team. Calgary selected him with their 9th round selection in 1984. He joined the Flames in 1985–86 and quickly established himself as the team's top defenceman in the eyes of his coaches and teammates. Suter finished the season with 18 goals and 68 points and was awarded the Calder Trophy as the NHL's top rookie in addition to being named to the All-Rookie Team. Additionally, Suter was the Flames' lone representative at the 1986 All-Star Game. Suter's 68 points was the second highest total by a rookie defenceman in league history, behind Larry Murphy's 76.

League awards
Player	Award
Gary Suter	Calder Memorial Trophy
Gary Suter	NHL All-Rookie Team
Team awards
Hakan Loob	Molson Cup

== Transactions ==
The draft-day trade that sent franchise scoring leader Kent Nilsson to Minnesota, along with a third round selection, for second round draft picks in 1985 and 1987 was immediately controversial in Calgary as players and fans were divided on the merit of dealing Nilsson. While some players felt the trade was inevitable, others expressed their disappointment at the move, including co-captain Lanny McDonald, who wondered how the team would replace Nilsson's offensive production. Former teammate Willi Plett supported the trade, noting Nilsson's inconsistency: "Maybe I shouldn't be saying this, but trading a player like him, it never hurts you."

The Flames completed a second significant trade in February, acquiring scoring forward Joe Mullen along with defencemen Terry Johnson and Rik Wilson from the St. Louis Blues in exchange for Ed Beers, Charlie Bourgeois and Gino Cavallini. The Flames had targeted Mullen, who had scored 40+ goals each of his previous two seasons and had 28 for the Blues at the time of the deal, believing he could be a game breaker for them heading into the playoffs.

=== Trades ===
May 29, 1985	To Calgary Flames 4th round pick in 1987 (Tim Harris)	To Toronto Maple Leafs Don Edwards
June 15, 1985	To Calgary Flames 2nd round pick in 1985 (Joe Nieuwendyk); 2nd round pick in 1987 (Stéphane Matteau)	To Minnesota North Stars Kent Nilsson; 3rd round pick in 1986 (Brad Turner)
January 16, 1986	To Calgary Flames Tom Thornbury	To Quebec Nordiques Tony Stiles
February 1, 1986	To Calgary Flames Joe Mullen; Terry Johnson; Rik Wilson	To St. Louis Blues Ed Beers; Charlie Bourgeois; Gino Cavallini
March 11, 1986	To Calgary Flames John Tonelli	To New York Islanders Steve Konroyd; Rich Kromm
March 11, 1986	To Calgary Flames Nick Fotiu	To New York Rangers Future Considerations
March 11, 1986	To Calgary Flames Tom McMurchy	To Chicago Black Hawks Rik Wilson

=== Free agents ===
Player	Former team
D Robin Bartell	Canadian national team
LW Bob Bodak	Springfield Indians (AHL)

Player	New team
C Bruce Eakin	Detroit Red Wings
RW Jim Jackson	Buffalo Sabres
C Steve Tambellini	Vancouver Canucks

== Draft picks ==
The 1985 NHL entry draft was held in Toronto, Ontario on June 15. The Flames used their first round pick, 17th overall, on American defenceman Chris Biotti. The team was surprised that he had fallen to them, believing Biotti to be the best defenceman available and expressing confidence he would be a star in the NHL. Their predictions ultimately proved unfounded. After spending two seasons at Harvard University, Biotti played three seasons for their minor league team in Salt Lake and another two in Europe before retiring. He never appeared in a National Hockey League game.

With the second round pick acquired from Minnesota in the Nilsson trade, Calgary selected East Coast Athletic Conference rookie of the year Joe Nieuwendyk from Cornell University. Labeled "Joe who?" by media and fans unsure of his potential, Nieuwendyk ultimately had the longest NHL career of any Flames' selection in this draft. He appeared in 1,257 games, scoring 1,126 points and won the Stanley Cup with Calgary in 1989, the Dallas Stars in 1999 and the New Jersey Devils in 2003, in addition to a gold medal at the 2002 Winter Olympics. He was elected to the Hockey Hall of Fame in 2011.

Rnd	Pick	Player	Nationality	Position	Team (league)	NHL statistics				
Rnd	Pick	Player	Nationality	Position	Team (league)	GP	G	A	Pts	PIM
1	17	Chris Biotti	United States	D	Belmont Hill (USHS-Mass)					
2	27	Joe Nieuwendyk	Canada	C	Cornell University (ECAC)	1257	564	562	1126	677
2	38	Jeff Wenaas	Canada	C	Medicine Hat Tigers (WHL)					
3	59	Lane MacDonald	United States	LW	Harvard University (ECAC)					
4	80	Roger Johansson	Sweden	D	IF Troja-Ljungby (Sweden)	161	9	34	43	163
5	101	Esa Keskinen	Finland	C	TPS (SM-liiga)					
6	122	Tim Sweeney	United States	LW	Weymouth-North (USHS-Mass)	291	55	83	138	123
7	143	Stu Grimson	Canada	LW	Regina Pats (WHL)	729	17	22	39	2113
8	164	Nate Smith	United States	D	N/A					
9	185	Darryl Olsen	Canada	D	St. Albert Saints (AJHL)	1	0	0	0	0
10	206	Peter Romberg	West Germany	D	ECD Iserlohn (W. Germany)					
11	227	Alexander Kozhevnikov	Soviet Union	F	Spartak Moscow (USSR)					
12	248	Bill Gregoire	Canada	D	Victoria Cougars (WHL)					
