= Rik Wilson =

American ice hockey player (1962–2016)

- Born: June 17, 1962 Long Beach, California, U.S.
- Died: January 22, 2016 (aged 53) St. Louis, Missouri, U.S.
- Height: 6 ft 0 in (183 cm)
- Weight: 180 lb (82 kg; 12 st 12 lb)
- Position: Defense
- Shot: Right
- Played for: St. Louis Blues; Calgary Flames; Chicago Blackhawks; EC VSV
- NHL draft: 12th overall, 1980; St. Louis Blues
- Playing career: 1981–1988

William Richard Wilson, Jr. (June 17, 1962 – January 22, 2016) was an American professional ice hockey player. He played in the National Hockey League with the St. Louis Blues, Calgary Flames, and Chicago Blackhawks between 1981 and 1988.

== Playing career ==
A youth roller hockey phenom in Southern California, Wilson moved as a teenager to Troy, Michigan and then Kingston, Ontario. Wilson played junior hockey with the Kingston Canadians of the Ontario Hockey League from 1979–1982, appearing in 151 games, scoring 172 points (54 goals-118 assists), and in 16 playoff games, he had 14 points (2G-12A). Wilson was drafted by the St. Louis Blues in the 1st round, 12th overall pick in the 1980 NHL entry draft. He also spent 4 games with the Salt Lake Golden Eagles of the CHL in the 1980–81 playoffs, getting 2 points (1G-1A) in 4 games.

He stepped right into the Blues lineup in 1981–82, playing in 48 games, getting 21 points (3G-18A), then had 3 points (0G-3A) in 9 post-season games as a 20-year-old. In 1982–83, his numbers slipped a bit to 14 points (3G-11A) in 56 games and spent some time with the Golden Eagles once again, getting no points in 4 games. Wilson spent most of the 1983–84 season with the Blues, getting 18 points (4G-14A) in 48 games, but went pointless in 10 playoff games. He also spent 6 games with the Montana Magic of the CHL, getting 3 assists. In 1984–85, Wilson would achieve a career high in points at 24 (8G-16A) in 51 games. He also had an assist in 2 playoff games. Wilson began the 1985–86 season in St. Louis, and after 32 games, he had 4 points (0G-4A). The Blues then traded Wilson, along with Joey Mullen and Terry Johnson to the Calgary Flames for Eddy Beers, Charlie Bourgeois, and Gino Cavallini on February 1, 1986.

Wilson would only play 2 games with the Flames, going pointless, before he was sent to the Moncton Golden Flames of the AHL, where he had 6 points (3G-3A) in 8 games. On March 11, 1986, Wilson was on the move again, this time to the Chicago Blackhawks, as the Flames traded him to the Hawks for Tom McMurchy. The Blackhawks assigned Wilson to the Nova Scotia Oilers for the remainder of the season, getting 9 points (4G-5A) in 13 games. In 1986–87, Wilson spent the season with the Nova Scotia Oilers, getting 21 points (8G-13A) in 45 games, and had 4 points (1G-3A) in 5 playoff games. For the 1987–88 season, Wilson moved to the Blackhawks IHL affiliate, the Saginaw Hawks, where he had 9 points (4G-5A) in 33 games, and earned his way back up to the NHL, playing in 14 games with Chicago, earning 9 points (4G-5A).

In 1988–89, Wilson went overseas to play in Europe, where he suited up for EC Villacher SV in Austria, where he recorded 60 points (17G-43A) in 45 games. On July 19, 1989, Wilson decided to sign with the St. Louis Blues, and played in 15 games with the Blues IHL affiliate, the Peoria Rivermen, getting 5 points (1G-4A) before being released. He then went to Europe once again, playing for ESV Kaufbeuren in West Germany, getting 9 points (2G-7A) in 9 games. In 1990–91, Wilson played 2 games for the New Haven Nighthawks of the AHL, getting no points, while playing the rest of the year with EC Villacher SV in Austria once again, getting 58 points (13G-45A) in 44 games. In 1991–92, Wilson spent the year in Italy playing for HC Auronzo, recording 35 points (13G-22A) in 24 games. He then made a brief appearance with the Fort Wayne Komets of the IHL, going pointless in 2 games in 1992–93.

Wilson then played in the RHI with the St. Louis Vipers from 1993–96, playing in 55 games, while scoring 110 points (35G-75A).

== Death ==
Wilson died on January 22, 2016, in St. Louis, Missouri at the age of 53.

== Career statistics ==
=== Regular season and playoffs ===
			Regular season					Playoffs
Season	Team	League	GP	G	A	Pts	PIM	GP	G	A	Pts	PIM
1978–79	Kingston Voyaguers	MetJBHL	44	18	33	51	—	—	—	—	—	—
1979–80	Kingston Canadians	OMJHL	67	15	38	53	75	3	1	3	4	2
1980–81	Kingston Canadians	OHL	68	30	70	100	108	13	1	9	10	18
1980–81	Salt Lake Golden Eagles	CHL	—	—	—	—	—	4	1	1	2	2
1981–82	St. Louis Blues	NHL	48	3	18	21	24	9	0	3	3	14
1981–82	Kingston Canadians	OHL	16	9	10	19	38	—	—	—	—	—
1982–83	St. Louis Blues	NHL	56	3	11	14	50	—	—	—	—	—
1982–83	Salt Lake Golden Eagles	CHL	4	0	0	0	0	—	—	—	—	—
1983–84	St. Louis Blues	NHL	48	7	11	18	53	11	0	0	0	9
1983–84	Montana Magic	CHL	6	0	3	3	2	—	—	—	—	—
1984–85	St. Louis Blues	NHL	51	8	16	24	39	2	0	1	1	0
1984–85	Flint Generals	IHL	—	—	—	—	—	1	0	0	0	0
1985–86	St. Louis Blues	NHL	32	0	4	4	48	—	—	—	—	—
1985–86	Calgary Flames	NHL	2	0	0	0	0	—	—	—	—	—
1985–86	Moncton Golden Flames	AHL	8	3	3	6	2	—	—	—	—	—
1985–86	Nova Scotia Oilers	AHL	13	4	5	9	11	—	—	—	—	—
1986–87	Nova Scotia Oilers	AHL	45	8	13	21	109	5	1	3	4	20
1987–88	Chicago Blackhawks	NHL	14	4	5	9	6	—	—	—	—	—
1987–88	Saginaw Hawks	IHL	33	4	5	9	105	—	—	—	—	—
1988–89	EC VSV	AUT	45	17	43	60	110	—	—	—	—	—
1989–90	ESV Kaufbeuren	GER-2	9	2	7	9	44	—	—	—	—	—
1989–90	Peoria Rivermen	IHL	15	1	4	5	34	—	—	—	—	—
1990–91	EC VSV	AUT	44	13	45	58	140	—	—	—	—	—
1990–91	New Haven Nighthawks	AHL	2	0	0	0	4	—	—	—	—	—
1991–92	HC Auronzo	ITA-2	24	13	22	35	80	—	—	—	—	—
1992–93	Fort Wayne Komets	IHL	2	0	0	0	4	—	—	—	—	—
NHL totals			251	25	65	90	220	22	0	4	4	23

== Awards ==
- OHL First All-Star Team (1981)

Preceded by Perry Turnbull	St. Louis Blues first-round draft pick 1980	Succeeded by Marty Ruff
