= Joe Mullen =

American ice hockey player (born 1957)

- Hockey Hall of Fame, 2000
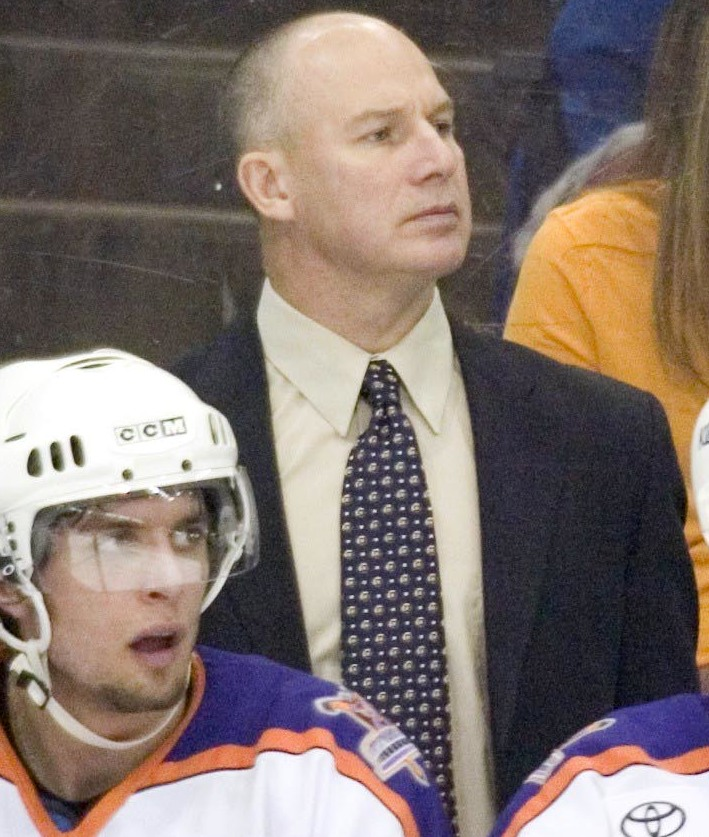
- Mullen in 2007
- Born: February 26, 1957 (age 69) New York City, New York, U.S.
- Height: 5 ft 9 in (175 cm)
- Weight: 180 lb (82 kg; 12 st 12 lb)
- Position: Right wing
- Shot: Right
- Played for: St. Louis Blues; Calgary Flames; Pittsburgh Penguins; Boston Bruins
- National team: United States
- NHL draft: Undrafted
- Playing career: 1979–1997

Joseph Patrick Mullen (born February 26, 1957) is an American former professional ice hockey player. He played 16 seasons in the National Hockey League (NHL) with the St. Louis Blues, Calgary Flames, Pittsburgh Penguins and Boston Bruins between 1980 and 1997. He was a member of three Stanley Cup championship teams, winning with the Flames in 1989 and the Penguins in 1991 and 1992. Mullen turned to coaching in 2000, serving as an assistant in Pittsburgh and briefly as head coach of the Wilkes-Barre/Scranton Penguins. He was an assistant with the Philadelphia Flyers from 2007 to 2017.

An undrafted player, Mullen was an all-star for the Boston College Eagles before turning professional in the Blues' organization. He was named the Central Hockey League (CHL) rookie of the year in 1980 and most valuable player in 1981 as a member of the Salt Lake Golden Eagles. He won the Lady Byng Memorial Trophy as the NHL's most gentlemanly player on two occasions as a member of the Flames, as well as the NHL Plus-Minus Award. Mullen was named to the first All-Star team in 1988–89 and played in three NHL All-Star Games.

Mullen played with the United States National Team on several occasions, including three Canada Cup tournaments. He was the first American player to score 500 goals and to reach 1,000 points in his career. Mullen received the Lester Patrick Trophy in 1995 in recognition of his contributions to the sport in the United States. He was inducted into the United States Hockey Hall of Fame in 1998 and the Hockey Hall of Fame in 2000.

== Early life ==
Born February 26, 1957, in New York City, Mullen grew up in the Hell's Kitchen neighborhood of Manhattan when it was controlled by Mickey Spillane. It was a rough neighborhood; Mullen later said that many of the people he grew up with fell into gangs and drug use, and several died before turning 21. He has three brothers, Ken, Tom Jr. and Brian, and a sister, Debbie.

The Mullen family lived less than a block from the old site of the third Madison Square Garden on Eighth Avenue between 49th and 50th Streets. Joe's father Tom was a longtime employee on the ice and maintenance staffs at the current Garden. Joe and his brothers often hung around the arena with their father, taking old sticks to play with. He began playing roller hockey at the age of five, playing in a concrete schoolyard and using a sanded down roll of electrical tape as a puck. The boys' schoolyard games served as a partial inspiration for New York Rangers' general manager, Emile Francis, to create the Metropolitan Junior Hockey Association in 1966. Mullen did not learn to ice skate until he was ten years old, but at the age of 14 joined the Metropolitan association as one of the league's youngest players. Mullen played four seasons in the league between 1971 and 1975. He scored 71 goals in 1973–74, then 182 points in 40 games the following season. Mullen's 110 goals in 1974–75 was 52 more than his nearest competitor.

== Playing career ==
=== College ===
Boston College offered Mullen a partial scholarship for the 1975–76 season to attend and play for the Eagles hockey program. He paid $700 out of his own pocket in the first year, but after scoring 34 points in 24 games as a freshman, the school gave him a full scholarship. Including tournament games, he led the Eagles in goals the following three seasons with 39, 38 and 30 respectively, and points in 1977–78 with 68 and in 1978–79 with 56. Mullen led the Eagles to the Eastern College Athletic Conference (ECAC) championship in 1977–78, and was named an all-star of the 1978 National Collegiate Athletic Association (NCAA) tournament. He scored a goal in the championship game, but the Eagles lost to cross-town rival Boston University, 5–3.

In four seasons with Boston College, Mullen set school records of 110 goals and 212 points (both subsequently broken). He was named to the All-ECAC, All-New England and NCAA All-American teams in 1978 and 1979. He won the Walter Brown Award in 1978 as the top American-born player in New England, and was the team captain in 1978–79. Boston College has twice honored Mullen; He was inducted into the school's Varsity Club Hall of Fame in 1998, while the hockey program retired his jersey number 21 the following year.

=== St. Louis Blues ===
While Mullen had a successful college career, he went undrafted by any National Hockey League (NHL) team. His small stature, coupled with a general bias against American players at the time, especially from non-traditional development areas, contributed to his failure to be selected. However, he received interest as a free agent from several teams following graduation as well as the United States Olympic Team. He passed up the opportunity to play in the 1980 Winter Olympics and signed with the St. Louis Blues on August 16, 1979. The Blues assigned Mullen to their Central Hockey League (CHL) affiliate, the Salt Lake Golden Eagles for the 1979–80 season. In 75 games with the Golden Eagles, Mullen scored 40 goals and 72 points. He was named to the CHL's second all-star team and was voted rookie of the year. He made his NHL debut in the 1980 Stanley Cup Playoffs, appearing in one game for the Blues.

Mullen returned to Salt Lake for the 1980–81 season where he scored 59 goals and led the league with 117 points. He was named to the first all-star team and won the CHL's Most Valuable Player Award. Opening the 1981–82 season with Salt Lake, Mullen had 21 goals in 27 games before he was recalled to St. Louis. He scored his first two NHL goals on January 5, 1981, against the Minnesota North Stars. They came eight seconds apart and set a Blues' franchise record for fastest two goals by one player. Mullen scored 25 goals for the Blues that season and became the first player in history to score at least 20 goals in both the minor leagues and the NHL in the same season.

Injuries reduced Mullen to 49 games with the Blues in 1982–83, but he still scored 47 points. His 41 goals in 1983–84 set a record as the most scored by an American-born player in NHL history (broken by Bobby Carpenter the following season). He again reached the 40-goal plateau in 1984–85, and had 92 points total. He missed the first three days of the Blues' training camp prior to the 1985–86 season in a contract dispute before agreeing to a one-year deal. On February 1, 1986, the Blues dealt him to the Calgary Flames as part of a six player trade. Mullen went to Calgary, along with Terry Johnson and Rik Wilson, for Eddy Beers, Charlie Bourgeois and Gino Cavallini.

=== Calgary Flames ===
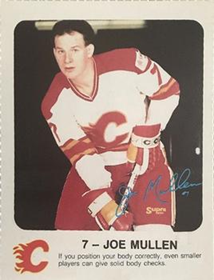
Mullen with the Calgary Flames c. 1987

The Flames felt they needed a quality offensive player and expected Mullen to fulfill that role. As it was the first time in his career he had been traded, Mullen was initially upset at the move. He was awed by the reaction he received from fans in Calgary however; fans greeted him warmly even as his flight landed to arrive in the city. Mullen described the experience as being "almost like ... an instant celebrity". He quickly established himself as a fan favorite, scoring 38 points in 29 games to end the regular season. He then led the league with 12 goals in the 1986 Stanley Cup playoffs. The Flames reached the Final for the first time in franchise history, but lost to the Montreal Canadiens in five games. Mullen set a personal best of 47 goals in his first full year in Calgary, 1986–87, and with only 14 penalty minutes on the season, was voted the winner of the Lady Byng Memorial Trophy as the NHL's most gentlemanly player.

Mullen's 40 goals in 1987–88 was the fifth consecutive season he reached that total. He won his first of three consecutive Molson Cups as the Flames player with the most three star selections during the season. 1988–89 was Mullen's best season in the NHL. He reached the 50 goal and 100 point milestones, leading the Flames with 51 and 110 respectively, and won his second Lady Byng Memorial Trophy. He was named a first-team All-Star at right wing and won the Plus-Minus Award at +51. Additionally, he played in his first NHL All-Star Game, appearing opposite his brother Brian. He led the 1989 Stanley Cup playoffs with 16 goals as the Flames defeated the Canadiens to win their first Stanley Cup championship.

Though he played in his second All-Star Game in 1990, Mullen's production fell by 41 points, to 69, and he failed to score at least 40 goals for the first time in six seasons. Concerned about his age, the Flames chose to trade the 33-year-old Mullen following the season. He was sent to the Pittsburgh Penguins in a draft day trade on June 16, 1990, in exchange for Pittsburgh's second round selection (26th overall, which turned out to be defenseman Nicolas Perreault).

=== Pittsburgh and Boston ===
The move to Pittsburgh brought Mullen closer to his New York home and fulfilled his desire to raise his family in his native United States. He also appreciated that the Penguins felt he could aid their team. Penguins' head coach Bob Johnson, who had previously coached him in Calgary, influenced the team's decision to acquire him. Mullen played only 47 games in 1990–91, scoring 17 goals and 39 points. He missed the last two months of the regular season after having surgery to remove a herniated disc in his back, an injury for which he could not identify a specific check or incident as the cause. He returned for the third game of the Penguins' Division semifinals series against the New Jersey Devils, scoring a goal. Mullen finished the 1991 Stanley Cup playoffs with eight goals, including two in game six of the Final, an 8–0 victory over the Minnesota North Stars that clinched Pittsburgh's first Stanley Cup.

Healthy throughout the 1991–92 season, Mullen rebounded offensively to score 42 goals and 87 points in 77 games. Midway through the season, he became the first player in Penguins' history to have consecutive four-goal games, doing so against the New York Islanders on December 23, 1991, and the Toronto Maple Leafs three days later. He appeared in only nine playoff games, however, as he suffered a knee injury that required surgery to repair in the second game of Pittsburgh's Division Final series against the New York Rangers. Mullen watched from the sidelines as the Penguins repeated as Stanley Cup champions.

Mullen tested free agency prior to the 1992–93 season, but ultimately chose to remain with the Penguins. He missed the first month of the season while recovering from his knee surgery, but finished the season with 33 goals and 70 points in 72 games. He added 6 points in 12 playoff games, but the Penguins' attempt at a third consecutive championship ended with a Division Final loss to the New York Islanders. A 38-goal season in 1993–94 led to Mullen's third All-Star Game appearance. The game was a homecoming of sorts for Mullen, as it was played in Madison Square Garden.

In the lockout-shortened 1994–95 season, Mullen scored 37 points in 45 games. He scored the 1,000th point of his career with a pair of assists on February 7, 1995, in a 7–3 victory over the Florida Panthers. He left the Penguins following the season, signing a one-year contract as a free agent with the Boston Bruins. Mullen chose to wear number 11 with the Bruins as his usual number 7 had been retired by the Bruins in honor of Phil Esposito. He missed the majority of the season after requiring surgery for another herniated disc, then suffering a sprained medial collateral ligament. He appeared in only 37 games, scoring 15 points.

Mullen rejoined the Penguins for the 1996–97 season, signing a one-year contract. He appeared in 54 games and scored 22 points. He scored his 500th career goal on March 14, 1997, in a 6–3 loss to the Colorado Avalanche. He retired as a player following the season.

Since his retirement Mullen has continued to play in amateur / charity games as a member of the Boston Bruins Alumni team.

=== International ===
Mullen made his first appearance with the United States National Team following his graduation from Boston College. He appeared in eight games at the 1979 World Ice Hockey Championships, scoring seven goals and adding an assist for the seventh place Americans. He was a member of three Canada Cup teams, appearing at the 1984, 1987 and 1991 tournaments. He scored two goals in the 1991 tournament, both of which came in a 7–3 semi-final victory over Finland that led the United States into their first tournament final. The Americans settled for second place, however, after losing to Canada in the championship series.

At the age of 41, Mullen emerged from retirement to join the Americans for a qualifying tournament leading into the 1999 Men's World Ice Hockey Championships. The United States had a disastrous 12th-place finish in the 1998 tournament, requiring them to go into a qualifying round to avoid relegation to the B division for 1999. As the qualifying tournament was played in November, American NHL players were not available. Mullen recorded three assists in three games, and helped the Americans stay in the top division for the 1999 tournament.

== Playing style ==
"Mully spent a career excelling in areas of the ice a lot of guys wouldn't visit on a threat of death. Great balance on his skates. Great desire. Great teammate. A little guy with big talent and a huge heart."

— Former teammate Brad McCrimmon

Mullen arrived in the NHL possessing great balance on his skates, an ability his teammates and coaches believed he gained from playing roller hockey. His coaches praised his willingness to play in the difficult areas of the ice, even though he stood only five foot nine inches tall and knew he would have to take a hit to make a play. Penguins' play-by-play announcer Mike Lange nicknamed Mullen "Slippery Rock Joe" for his ability to evade opposing players.

The first American player in NHL history to score 500 goals and 1,000 points, Mullen's career totals of 502 goals and 1,063 points stood as American records until surpassed by Mike Modano and Phil Housley, respectively. Along with his brother Brian, Mullen was named a recipient of the Lester Patrick Award in 1995 in recognition of his contributions to hockey in the United States. He was inducted into the United States Hockey Hall of Fame in 1998, the Pittsburgh Penguins Hall of Fame as well and two years later, to the Hockey Hall of Fame. In 2011, the St. Louis Blues honored four players who wore uniform number 7 for their team. Mullen, Red Berenson, Garry Unger and Keith Tkachuk were each celebrated as part of the ceremony.

== Coaching career ==
Mullen turned to coaching in 2000, joining the Penguins' staff as an assistant under Ivan Hlinka. He remained on the staff when Hlinka was fired one year later, under replacement Rick Kehoe, then Ed Olczyk. Mullen was removed from his role midway through the 2005–06 NHL season when the Penguins fired Olczyk and his entire staff. He was retained by the organization, however, and named interim head coach of the Wilkes-Barre/Scranton Penguins for the remainder of the American Hockey League (AHL) season. In 52 games, Mullen achieved a record of 28 wins, 16 losses, 3 ties and 5 overtime losses. The Penguins chose not to retain Mullen following the season. He moved to Pittsburgh's cross-state rival, the Philadelphia Flyers, first as an assistant with the AHL's Philadelphia Phantoms in 2006–07, then joining the NHL team in 2007. Mullen coached the team's power play, and was a member of the staff when the team reached the 2010 Stanley Cup Final. He remained on the Flyers' staff through the end of 2016–17 season.

== Personal life ==
Mullen and his wife, Linda, have four children: sons Ryan, Michael and Patrick, and daughter Erin. Patrick is also a professional hockey player. He signed a contract with the Ottawa Senators organization for the 2013–14 season.

== Career statistics ==
=== Regular season and playoffs ===
			Regular season					Playoffs
Season	Team	League	GP	G	A	Pts	PIM	GP	G	A	Pts	PIM
1971–72	New York 14th Precinct	NYJHL	30	13	11	24	2	—	—	—	—	—
1972–73	New York Westsiders	NYJHL	40	14	28	42	8	—	—	—	—	—
1973–74	New York Westsiders	NYJHL	42	71	49	120	41	7	9	9	18	0
1974–75	New York Westsiders	NYJHL	40	110	72	182	20	13	24	13	37	2
1975–76	Boston College Eagles	ECAC	24	16	18	34	4	—	—	—	—	—
1976–77	Boston College Eagles	ECAC	28	28	26	54	8	—	—	—	—	—
1977–78	Boston College Eagles	ECAC	34	34	34	68	12	—	—	—	—	—
1978–79	Boston College Eagles	ECAC	25	32	24	56	8	—	—	—	—	—
1979–80	Salt Lake Golden Eagles	CHL	75	40	32	72	21	13	9	11	20	0
1979–80	St. Louis Blues	NHL	—	—	—	—	—	1	0	0	0	0
1980–81	Salt Lake Golden Eagles	CHL	80	59	58	117	8	17	11	9	20	0
1981–82	Salt Lake Golden Eagles	CHL	27	21	27	48	12	—	—	—	—	—
1981–82	St. Louis Blues	NHL	45	25	34	59	4	10	7	11	18	4
1982–83	St. Louis Blues	NHL	49	17	30	47	6	—	—	—	—	—
1983–84	St. Louis Blues	NHL	80	41	44	85	19	6	2	0	2	0
1984–85	St. Louis Blues	NHL	79	40	52	92	6	3	0	0	0	0
1985–86	St. Louis Blues	NHL	48	28	24	52	10	—	—	—	—	—
1985–86	Calgary Flames	NHL	29	16	22	38	11	21	12	7	19	4
1986–87	Calgary Flames	NHL	79	47	40	87	14	6	2	1	3	0
1987–88	Calgary Flames	NHL	80	40	44	84	30	7	2	4	6	10
1988–89	Calgary Flames	NHL	79	51	59	110	16	21	16	8	24	4
1989–90	Calgary Flames	NHL	78	36	33	69	24	6	3	0	3	0
1990–91	Pittsburgh Penguins	NHL	47	17	22	39	6	22	8	9	17	4
1991–92	Pittsburgh Penguins	NHL	77	42	45	87	30	9	3	1	4	4
1992–93	Pittsburgh Penguins	NHL	72	33	37	70	14	12	4	2	6	6
1993–94	Pittsburgh Penguins	NHL	84	38	32	70	41	6	1	0	1	2
1994–95	Pittsburgh Penguins	NHL	45	16	21	37	6	12	0	3	3	4
1995–96	Boston Bruins	NHL	37	8	7	15	0	—	—	—	—	—
1996–97	Pittsburgh Penguins	NHL	54	7	15	22	4	1	0	0	0	0
NHL totals			1,062	502	561	1,063	241	143	60	46	106	42

=== International ===
Year	Team	Event	Results	GP	G	A	Pts	PIM
1979	United States	WC	7th	8	7	1	8	2
1984	United States	CC	SF	6	1	3	4	2
1987	United States	CC	QF	4	3	0	3	0
1991	United States	CC	2nd	8	2	3	5	0
1999	United States	WC	6th	3	0	3	3	0
Senior totals				29	13	10	23	4

=== Coaching ===
League	Team	Season	Regular season							Post season
League	Team	Season	G	W	L	OTL	SOL	Pct	Division rank	Result
AHL	Wilkes-Barre/Scranton Penguins	2005–06	52	28	16	3	5	.615	1st East Division	Lost in second round
3ICE	Team Mullen	2022	21	16	5	—	—	.762	1st place	Lost in Patrick Cup Finals
3ICE	Team Mullen	2023	6	3	3	—	—	.500	5th place	Missed playoffs
AHL totals			52	28	16	3	5	.615		

== Awards and honors ==
Award	Year
University
Walter Brown Award; Outstanding American-born player in New England	1978
All-NCAA All-Tournament Team	1978
All-ECAC Hockey First Team	1977–78; 1978–79
All-New England Team	1977–78; 1978–79
AHCA East All-American	1977–78; 1978–79
Central Hockey League
Rookie of the Year	1979–80
Second All-Star team	1979–80
Most Valuable Player	1980–81
First All-Star team	1980–81
3ICE
Eddie Johnston Coach of the Year	2022

Award	Year
National Hockey League
Lady Byng Memorial Trophy; Gentlemanly conduct	1986–87, 1988–89
NHL Plus-Minus Award	1988–89
First All-Star team	1988–89
Played in NHL All-Star Game	1989, 1990, 1994
Stanley Cup champion	1989 (Calgary), 1991, 1992 (Pittsburgh)
Lester Patrick Trophy; Contribution to hockey in the United States	1995
Team awards
Molson Cup; Most three-star selections (Calgary)	1986–87, 1987–88, 1988–89

== See also ==
- List of members of the Hockey Hall of Fame
- List of members of the United States Hockey Hall of Fame
- List of NHL players with 1,000 games played
- List of NHL players with 500 goals

Awards and achievements
Preceded by Rick Meagher	ECAC Hockey Most Outstanding Player in Tournament; 1978	Succeeded by Greg Moffett
Preceded by Doug Palazzari	Winner of the Tommy Ivan Trophy; 1980–81	Succeeded by Bob Francis
Preceded by Mike Bossy; Mats Naslund	Winner of the Lady Byng Trophy; 1986–87; 1988–89	Succeeded by Mats Naslund; Brett Hull
Preceded by Brad McCrimmon	Winner of the NHL Plus/Minus Award; 1989	Succeeded by Paul Cavallini
Sporting positions
Preceded by Rick Kehoe	Head coach of the Wilkes-Barre/Scranton Penguins; 2006	Succeeded by Todd Richards
