= Marty Ruff =

Canadian ice hockey player (born 1963)

- Born: May 19, 1963 (age 62) Warburg, Alberta, Canada
- Height: 6 ft 1 in (185 cm)
- Weight: 195 lb (88 kg; 13 st 13 lb)
- Position: Defence
- Played for: Lethbridge Broncos; Muskegon Mohawks; Toledo Goaldiggers; Montana Magic; Portland Winter Hawks; Peoria Rivermen
- NHL draft: 20th overall, 1981; St. Louis Blues
- Playing career: 1979–1986

Marty Ruff (born May 19, 1963) is a Canadian former professional ice hockey defenceman. He was drafted in the first round, 20th overall, by the St. Louis Blues in the 1981 NHL entry draft, however, he never played in the National Hockey League. He is the younger brother of former player and coach Lindy Ruff of the NHL.

== Career statistics ==
=== Regular season and playoffs ===
			Regular season					Playoffs
Season	Team	League	GP	G	A	Pts	PIM	GP	G	A	Pts	PIM
1979–80	Lethbridge Broncos	WHL	3	0	0	0	0	—	—	—	—	—
1980–81	Lethbridge Broncos	WHL	71	9	37	46	222	7	0	2	2	17
1981–82	Lethbridge Broncos	WHL	46	7	28	35	188	12	0	5	5	35
1982–83	Lethbridge Broncos	WHL	53	7	23	30	128	20	2	5	7	43
1983–84	Portland Winter Hawks	WHL	10	4	2	6	30	—	—	—	—	—
1983–84	Muskegon Mohawks	IHL	44	3	15	18	44	—	—	—	—	—
1983–84	Toledo Goaldiggers	IHL	2	0	1	1	0	—	—	—	—	—
1983–84	Montana Magic	CHL	1	0	0	0	2	—	—	—	—	—
1984–85	Peoria Rivermen	IHL	5	0	1	1	0	—	—	—	—	—
1985–86	Peoria Rivermen	IHL	44	3	6	9	34	5	1	0	1	2
WHL totals			174	27	90	117	568	39	2	12	14	95
IHL totals			95	6	23	29	78	5	1	0	1	2

Awards and achievements
Preceded by Rik Wilson	St. Louis Blues first-round draft pick 1981	Succeeded by Jocelyn Lemieux
