= Gino Cavallini =

Canadian ice hockey player (born 1962)

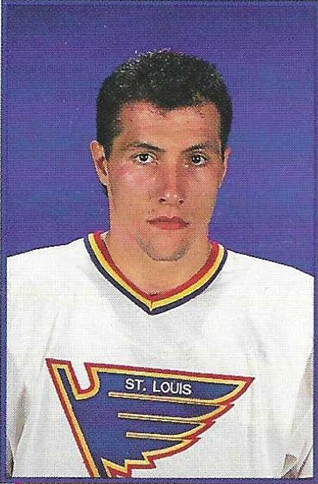
- Cavallini in 1987 card
- Born: November 24, 1962 (age 63) Toronto, Ontario, Canada
- Height: 6 ft 1 in (185 cm)
- Weight: 215 lb (98 kg; 15 st 5 lb)
- Position: Left wing
- Shot: Left
- Played for: Calgary Flames; St. Louis Blues; Quebec Nordiques; EV Landshut; HC Bolzano; Villacher SV
- NHL draft: Undrafted
- Playing career: 1984–2000

Gino J. Cavallini (born November 24, 1962) is a Canadian former professional ice hockey forward. He played in the National Hockey League with the Calgary Flames, St. Louis Blues, and Quebec Nordiques between 1985 and 1993. He is the brother of the NHL hockey player Paul Cavallini.

== Playing career ==
Cavallini played one year for the St. Michael's Buzzers, a Junior hockey team in the Ontario Hockey Association (now part of the Ontario Provincial Junior A Hockey League). Following his short stint with the Buzzers, Cavallini was offered a scholarship to play college hockey for the Bowling Green State University Falcons. He remained with the Falcons for two years (1982–1984). He is noted for scoring the game-winning goal in the 1984 NCAA Championship game, 7:11 into the fourth overtime. At 97 minutes and 11 seconds, it stands today as one of the longest games in Division I hockey history.

Following his two seasons at Bowling Green, the Calgary Flames signed Cavallini as a free agent during the 1984–85 season. He would go on to score six goals in 27 games that season.

Cavallini played parts of two seasons with the Flames, alternating between the NHL and minor AHL team, the Moncton Golden Flames. Following his second professional season, he was traded to the St. Louis Blues as part of a multi-player deal (Cavallini, Ed Beers and Charlie Bourgeois for Joey Mullen, Terry Johnson and Rik Wilson). While with the Blues, Cavallini served as the alternate captain to Brian Sutter. As part of the Ron Caron-managed franchise from 1986–1992, Cavallini helped provide leadership, enthusiasm, and disciplined strength on the ice. During those seasons, the Blues re-established themselves as a competitive force in the Norris Division making the playoffs each year. During his playing seasons with the Blues, Cavallini's brother, defenseman Paul also joined the squad.

Referred to locally as "The Tank", Cavallini's grit on the ice was evident throughout his NHL seasons with Calgary (54 games), St. Louis (454 games), and later with the Quebec Nordiques (85 games). In total he played 593 regular-season games, scoring 114 goals and 159 assists for 273 points and collecting 507 penalty minutes. He also played in 74 playoff games, scoring 14 goals and 19 assists for 33 points and collecting 66 penalty minutes. From 1986–1990, Cavallini had his best NHL seasons, recording more than 30 points per season and scoring 20 goals in the 1988–89 season.

Cavallini left the NHL after the 1993 season, spending 3 seasons with the Milwaukee Admirals of the International Hockey League. His commitment to the game helped solidify Cavallini as a leader for the Admirals, with impressive stats scoring 139 goals and 248 points in 3 seasons. He then completed his career in Europe, playing primarily in Germany with EV Landshut and Austria with EC Villacher before retiring in the 2000–01 season.

== Personal life ==
Cavallini's son, Aidan, played hockey at the University of Wisconsin. Aidan is married to goaltender Alex Cavallini.

== Career statistics ==
=== Regular season and playoffs ===
			Regular season					Playoffs
Season	Team	League	GP	G	A	Pts	PIM	GP	G	A	Pts	PIM
1979–80	Oak Ridges Dynes	COJHL	43	23	24	47	102	—	—	—	—	—
1980–81	Oak Ridges Dynes	COJHL	37	27	56	83	42	—	—	—	—	—
1980–81	Aurora Tigers	OPJAHL	2	0	0	0	0	—	—	—	—	—
1981–82	St. Michael's Buzzers	MetJBHL	33	22	33	55	50	—	—	—	—	—
1982–83	Bowling Green State University	CCHA	40	8	16	24	52	—	—	—	—	—
1983–84	Bowling Green State University	CCHA	43	25	23	48	16	—	—	—	—	—
1984–85	Calgary Flames	NHL	27	6	10	16	14	3	0	0	0	4
1984–85	Moncton Golden Flames	AHL	51	29	19	48	28	—	—	—	—	—
1985–86	Calgary Flames	NHL	27	7	7	14	26	—	—	—	—	—
1985–86	Moncton Golden Flames	AHL	4	3	2	5	7	—	—	—	—	—
1985–86	St. Louis Blues	NHL	30	6	5	11	36	17	4	5	9	10
1986–87	St. Louis Blues	NHL	80	18	26	44	54	6	3	1	4	2
1987–88	St. Louis Blues	NHL	64	15	17	32	62	10	5	5	10	19
1988–89	St. Louis Blues	NHL	74	20	23	43	79	9	0	2	2	17
1989–90	St. Louis Blues	NHL	80	15	15	30	77	12	1	3	4	2
1990–91	St. Louis Blues	NHL	78	8	27	35	81	13	1	3	4	2
1991–92	St. Louis Blues	NHL	48	9	7	16	40	—	—	—	—	—
1991–92	Quebec Nordiques	NHL	18	1	7	8	4	—	—	—	—	—
1992–93	Quebec Nordiques	NHL	67	9	15	24	34	4	0	0	0	0
1993–94	Milwaukee Admirals	IHL	78	43	35	78	64	4	3	4	7	6
1994–95	Milwaukee Admirals	IHL	80	53	35	88	54	15	7	2	9	10
1995–96	Milwaukee Admirals	IHL	82	43	39	82	20	5	3	1	4	2
1996–97	EV Landshut	DEL	48	25	29	54	32	7	3	2	5	4
1996–97	HC Bolzano	ITA	—	—	—	—	—	3	2	1	3	0
1997–98	EV Landshut	DEL	48	12	18	30	30	6	1	5	6	25
1998–99	Villacher SV	AUT	56	42	51	93	42	—	—	—	—	—
1999–00	Villacher SV	IEL	32	25	38	63	6	—	—	—	—	—
1999–00	Villacher SV	AUT	15	13	16	29	8	—	—	—	—	—
2000–01	EHC Biel	NLB	40	33	38	71	30	11	7	7	14	6
NHL totals			593	114	159	273	507	74	14	19	33	56
