= Paul Cavallini =

Canadian ice hockey player (born 1965)

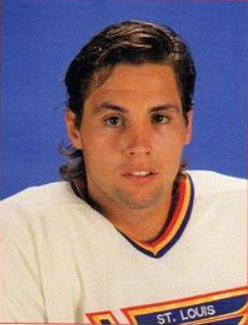
- Cavallini in 1989 card
- Born: October 13, 1965 (age 60) Toronto, Ontario, Canada
- Height: 6 ft 1 in (185 cm)
- Weight: 210 lb (95 kg; 15 st 0 lb)
- Position: Defence
- Shot: Left
- Played for: Washington Capitals; St. Louis Blues; Dallas Stars
- NHL draft: 205th overall, 1984; Washington Capitals
- Playing career: 1986–1995

Paul Edward Cavallini (born October 13, 1965) is a Canadian former ice hockey defenceman. He is the younger brother of former player Gino Cavallini, who was his teammate for several years with the St. Louis Blues. In 564 NHL games, Cavallini scored 56 goals and 177 assists.

== Early life ==
Cavallini was born on October 13, 1965, in Toronto, Ontario to Italian immigrants Phyllis and Rino Cavallini. He grew up alongside his older brother Gino, who also played ice hockey.

== Playing career ==
=== High school and college ===
Cavallini attended Chaminade College School and then graduated from Father Henry Carr Catholic Secondary School before enrolling at Providence College for his college ice hockey career. Prior to joining the Providence Friars men's ice hockey team, Cavallini was drafted in the 10th round, 205th overall, by the Washington Capitals in the 1984 NHL entry draft. Between graduating and joining the Friars, Cavallini lost 20 pounds and began his freshman season at 205. In order to maintain his weight, he skipped meals and use a sauna before practice.

Cavallini helped the Friars advance to the 1985 NCAA National Championship against the RPI Engineers and scored the team's sole goal in their 2–1 loss. He was also named to the All-Freshman Team. Due to his impressive freshman season, Cavallini was recruited by Dave King to join the Canadian Olympic hockey program. Despite leaving college early, Cavallini took courses at the University of Waterloo to finish his degree. While with Team Canada, Cavallini continued to receive criticism about his weight from the coaching staff and King bought him an exercise bike. However, he passed out upon weighing in at 195lbs due to his rapid weight loss and strict diet. Following this, the Washington Capitals general manager and coaching staff told King to end the dieting and bought Cavallini a steak dinner.

=== Professional ===
Despite signing a three-year contract with the Canadian Olympic hockey program, Cavallini chose to turn professional in 1986 and signed a contract with the Washington Capitals. He was subsequently assigned to their American Hockey League (AHL) affiliate, the Binghamton Whalers and made his debut on March 7, 1986. As his equipment had not arrived in time for the game, he used the stick of a teammates instead.

After playing parts of two seasons with the Capitals, Cavallini was traded to the St. Louis Blues where he would spend almost six seasons including his best campaign, the 1989–90 season. He played in the 1990 All-Star game and led the league in plus/minus rating that season. Cavallini missed 13 games during the 1990–91 season with a left index finger injury after blocking a slapshot from Doug Wilson. The force of Wilson's shot severed the tip of Cavallini's finger, and doctors were unable to reattach the tip in surgery. Shortly thereafter, a local radio disc jockey acquired the tip of his finger from a pathology clerk and announced that he would be putting it up for a charity auction. However, due to the outrage this received, the clerk was fired, and the disc jockey apologised. Cavallini remained on the sidelines until January 25 against the Detroit Red Wings.

Cavallini returned to the Capitals for a second time during the 1992–93 NHL season in a trade that sent Kevin Miller to the Blues. Cavallini would once again be traded by the Capitals, this time to the Dallas Stars where he would play until his retirement a few weeks into the 1995–96 NHL season.

== Personal life ==
Cavallini is married to former Olympian Tracy Smith.

== Awards and honors ==
Award	Year
All-Hockey East Rookie Team	1984–85

== Career statistics ==
			Regular season					Playoffs
Season	Team	League	GP	G	A	Pts	PIM	GP	G	A	Pts	PIM
1981–82	Dixie Beehives	OPJHL	5	1	1	2	7	—	—	—	—	—
1982–83	Henry Carr Crusaders	MetJHL	35	6	16	22	191	—	—	—	—	—
1983–84	Henry Carr Crusaders	MetJHL	54	20	41	61	190	—	—	—	—	—
1984–85	Providence College	HE	45	5	14	19	64	—	—	—	—	—
1985–86	Canada	Intl	52	1	11	12	95	—	—	—	—	—
1985–86	Binghamton Whalers	AHL	15	3	4	7	20	6	0	2	2	56
1986–87	Washington Capitals	NHL	6	0	2	2	8	—	—	—	—	—
1986–87	Binghamton Whalers	AHL	66	12	24	36	188	13	2	7	9	35
1987–88	Washington Capitals	NHL	24	2	3	5	66	—	—	—	—	—
1987–88	St. Louis Blues	NHL	48	4	7	11	86	10	1	6	7	26
1988–89	St. Louis Blues	NHL	65	4	20	24	128	10	2	2	4	14
1989–90	St. Louis Blues	NHL	80	8	39	47	106	12	2	3	5	20
1990–91	St. Louis Blues	NHL	67	10	25	35	89	13	2	3	5	20
1991–92	St. Louis Blues	NHL	66	10	25	35	95	4	0	1	1	6
1992–93	St. Louis Blues	NHL	11	1	4	5	10	—	—	—	—	—
1992–93	Washington Capitals	NHL	71	5	8	13	46	6	0	2	2	18
1993–94	Dallas Stars	NHL	74	11	33	44	82	9	1	8	9	4
1994–95	Dallas Stars	NHL	44	1	11	12	28	5	0	2	2	6
1995–96	Dallas Stars	NHL	8	0	0	0	6	—	—	—	—	—
NHL totals			564	56	177	233	750	69	8	27	35	114

Awards and achievements
Preceded by Joe Mullen	Winner of the NHL Plus/Minus Award; 1990	Succeeded by Marty McSorley and Theoren Fleury
