= Patrick Mullen (ice hockey) =

American ice hockey player

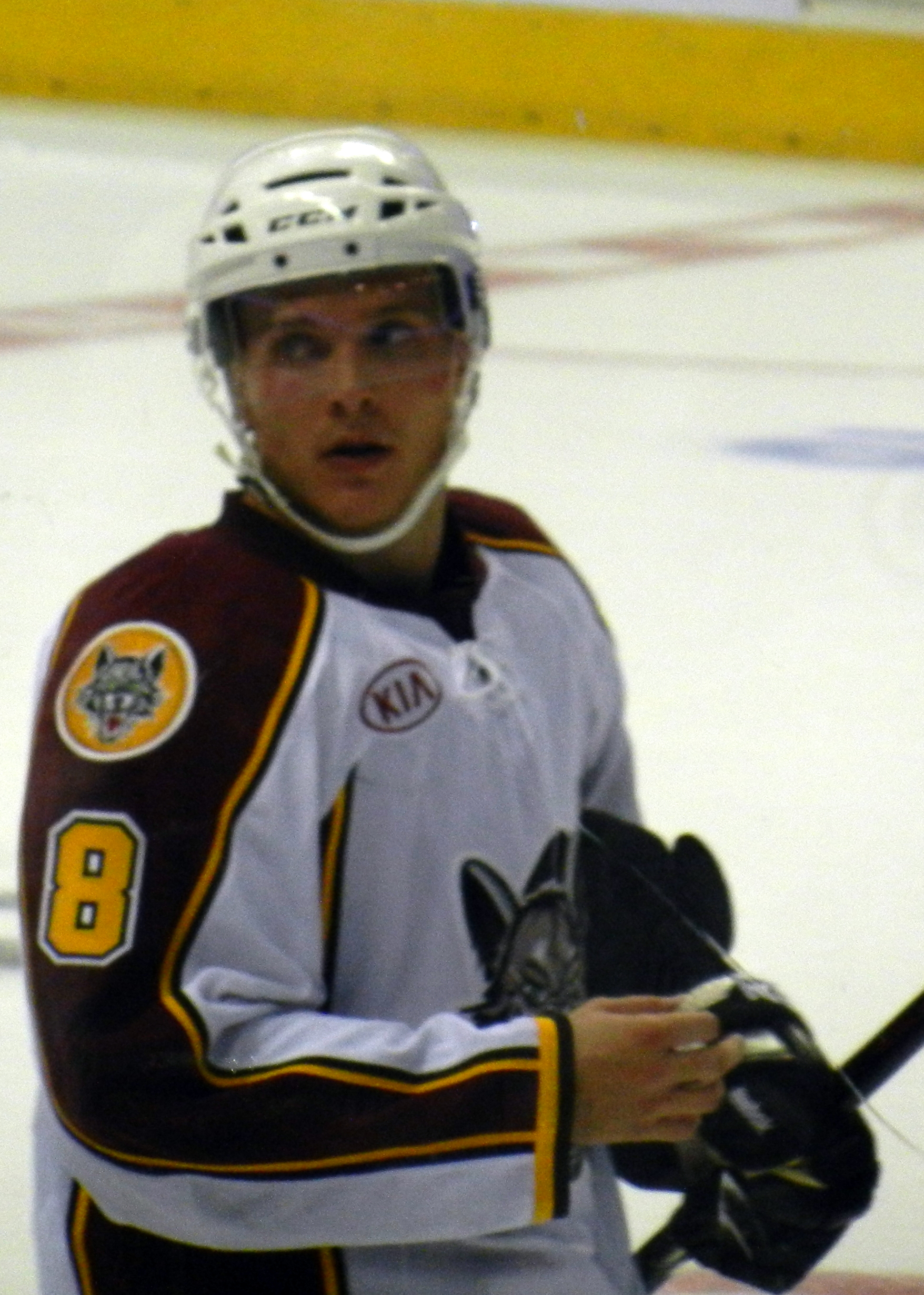
- Born: 6 May 1986 (age 40) Boston, Massachusetts, U.S.
- Height: 6 ft 0 in (183 cm)
- Weight: 181 lb (82 kg; 12 st 13 lb)
- Position: Defense
- Shoots: Right
- EIHL team Former teams: Belfast Giants; Manchester Monarchs; Chicago Wolves; Utica Comets; Binghamton Senators; Milwaukee Admirals; Dinamo Riga; Rochester Americans; Linköpings HC; Adler Mannheim; Vienna Capitals
- NHL draft: Undrafted
- Playing career: 2009–present

Patrick Mullen (born 6 May 1986) is an American professional ice hockey player, currently playing for the Belfast Giants in the UK's Elite Ice Hockey League (EIHL). Mullen was most recently with the Vienna Capitals in the Erste Bank Eishockey Liga (EBEL). Mullen played one season for the Sioux Falls Stampede in the United States Hockey League (USHL) before attending the University of Denver (DU). He was a four-year student-athlete at DU, twice being named to the All-WCHA Academic Team and as a senior was awarded the Lowe's Senior CLASS Award. Following his college career he signed with the Los Angeles Kings as a free agent. Mullen played three seasons for the Kings minor league affiliate the Manchester Monarchs, before leaving as a free agent and signing with the Vancouver Canucks. Mullen has played both forward and defense throughout his career. He is the son of Hockey Hall of Famer Joe Mullen.

== Early life ==
Patrick was born in Boston, Massachusetts to Linda and Joe Mullen. He has two older brothers and a younger sister. Their father is a Hockey Hall of Fame forward. He graduated as an honor roll student from Upper St. Clair High School in Pittsburgh.

== Playing career ==
Mullen played junior ice hockey for the Sioux Falls Stampede in the United States Hockey League (USHL) during the 2004–05 season. He registered 37 points in 60 games, fourth on the team; he also led the Stampede in plus-minus with a +11 rating. After the season, Mullen chose to attend the University of Denver (DU) in part for the coaches and the city of Denver.

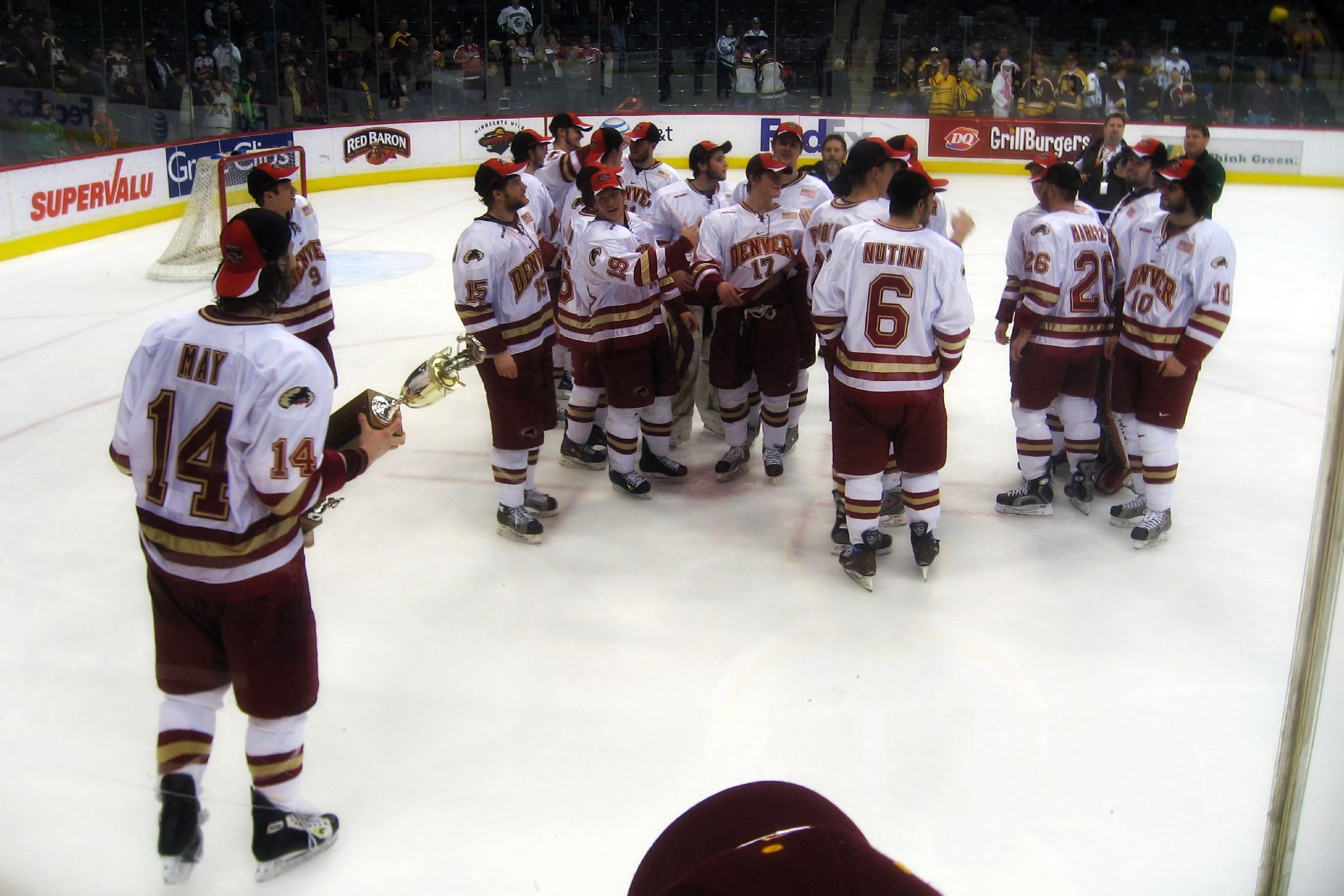
Members of the Denver Pioneers celebrating their 2008 tournament victory

Prior to his first season with the Pioneers, Mullen was named Preseason Player to Watch by College Hockey News. He scored his first career goal in a 4–2 win against the Air Force Academy, helping DU to their first win of the year. He finished the year with 7 goals and 17 points in 37 games, tying for sixth on the team for goals and points. The following season, he recorded four multi-point games, though he only managed to duplicate the 17 points recorded in his freshman season. Mullen spent most of the season on forward, but also played four games as a defenseman. He missed the Western Collegiate Hockey Association (WCHA) playoffs after contracting mononucleosis. Following the conclusion of the season, Mullen was named to the All-WCHA Academic Team.

In the 2007–08 season, Mullen began the year playing defense. Though he did spend some time at forward, Mullen led all DU defenders in scoring by season's end. In back-to-back games leading up to the WCHA playoffs, Mullen received two 10-minute misconduct penalties. As a result, head coach George Gwozdecky suspended Mullen for the first game of the playoffs. Mullen returned from his suspension the following game and helped the Pioneers to an eventual WCHA tournament win. In his senior season, Mullen set career highs in assists and points while leading Denver in blocked shots. At the conclusion of the year, he was again named to the All-WCHA Academic Team and was awarded the Lowe's Senior CLASS Award.

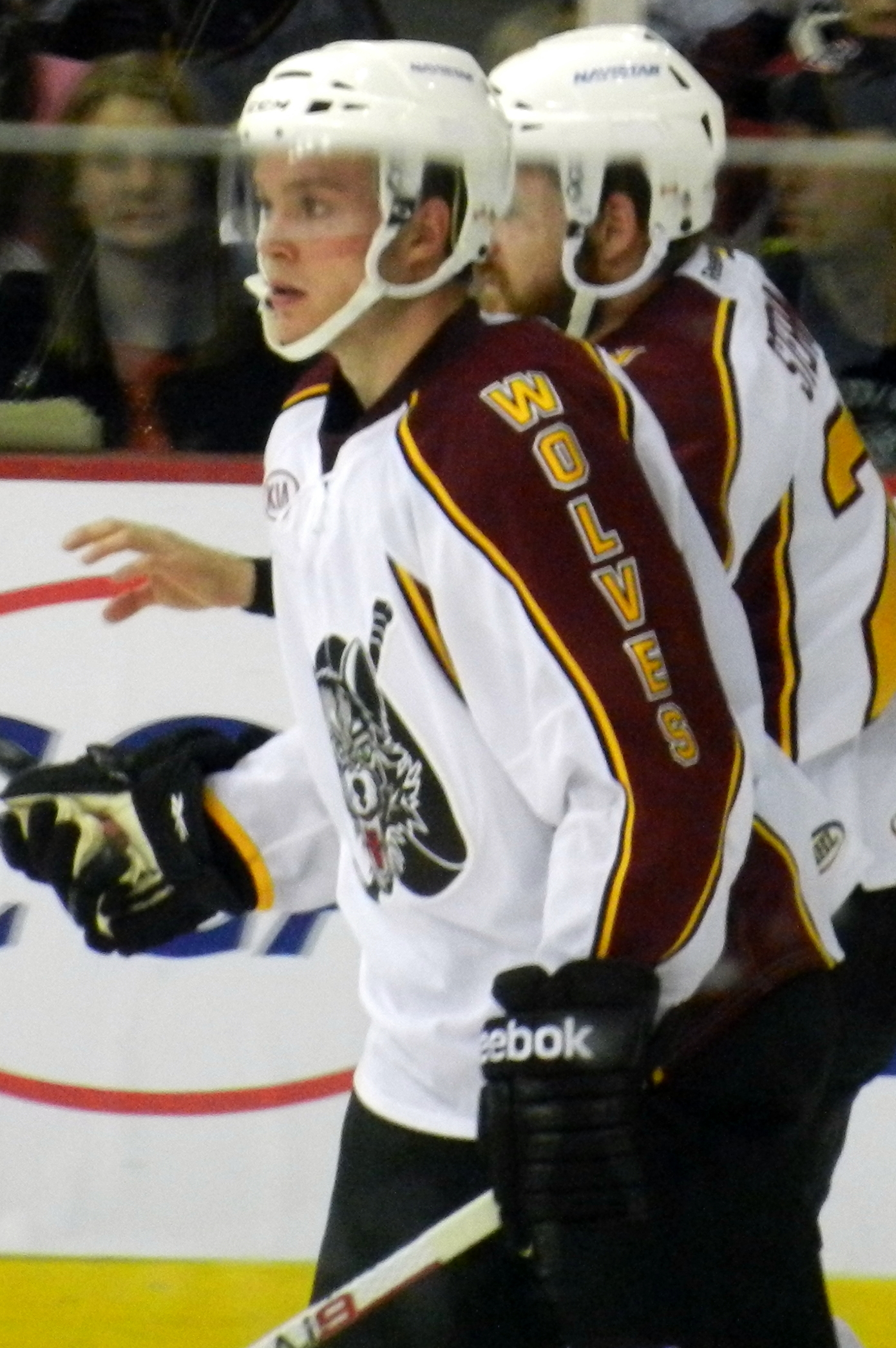
Mullen playing for the Chicago Wolves

Undrafted out of college, Mullen signed a two-year entry-level free agent contract with the Los Angeles Kings on 3 April 2009. Playing with the Kings farm team the Manchester Monarchs, Mullen recorded his first professional point, an assist, in his first game, a 6–3 victory over the Albany River Rats. His first professional goal came almost two months later in a 4–2 win against the Springfield Falcons. After playing 36 games for the Monarchs, Mullen was sent down to their ECHL affiliate, the Ontario Reign. After playing only one game for the Reign, he was recalled by Manchester. He finished the year playing 8 more games for the Monarchs bring his total to 44 and recorded 4 goals and 10 points in his first professional season. In the playoffs Mullen played two games without recording a point. In his second season Mullen received more responsibilities after being added to the Monarchs power play unit, and while he played mostly on defense, he did see some ice time at forward. With the changes he doubled his production to 20 points in 67 games. During the off-season Mullen was re-signed by the Kings to a one-year contract. In his third season he again double his point production registering 41 points in 69 games. He also played in 4 playoff games for the Monarchs registering a goal and three points.

Following the completion of his contract Mullen left the Kings organization as a free agent and signed with the Vancouver Canucks. Due to the depth on defense on Vancouver Mullen was not expected to make the Canucks out of training camp. With the 2012–13 lockout approaching Mullen was assigned to the Canuck's American Hockey League affiliate, the Chicago Wolves. In his second game with the Wolves Mullen suffered an injury to his left shoulder. The injury required surgery which ended his season. Despite his limited playing time in Chicago the Canucks re-signed Mullen to a one-year contract in the off-season.

On 4 March 2014, Mullen was traded by the Canucks to the Ottawa Senators organization for Jeff Costello.

In the 2015–16 season, his third within the Senators' organization, Mullen was traded by Ottawa to the Nashville Predators in exchange for Conor Allen on 14 January 2016.

At the conclusion of the season and out of contract with the Predators, Mullen as a free agent left North America and accepted an initial try-out contract with Latvian club, Dinamo Riga of the KHL on 27 July 2016. He saw the ice in 39 KHL games, tallying four goals and eight assists, before parting ways with Dinamo on 13 December 2016. On 2 February 2017, having agreed to return to the AHL with the Binghamton Senators, Mullen was claimed off waivers by the Rochester Americans and played out the remainder of the 2016–17 season in collecting 14 points in 27 games.

As a free agent, Mullen opted to return abroad in agreeing to a two-year contract with Swedish outfit, Linköpings HC of the SHL on 10 July 2017. On 15 February 2018, he left Sweden for German DEL side Adler Mannheim, joining the team on loan for the remainder of the 2017–18 campaign.

In August 2019, Mullen moved to British EIHL side Belfast Giants. Mullen left Belfast in 2020. He rejoined the Giants in March 2022 as injury cover.

Mullen was chosen to play for his father's 3ICE team during the 2022, 2023, and 2025 seasons.

== Career statistics ==
			Regular season					Playoffs
Season	Team	League	GP	G	A	Pts	PIM	GP	G	A	Pts	PIM
2004–05	Sioux Falls Stampede	USHL	60	14	23	37	8	—	—	—	—	—
2005–06	University of Denver	WCHA	37	7	10	27	24	—	—	—	—	—
2006–07	University of Denver	WCHA	37	5	12	17	20	—	—	—	—	—
2007–08	University of Denver	WCHA	40	4	18	22	65	—	—	—	—	—
2008–09	University of Denver	WCHA	38	4	21	25	39	—	—	—	—	—
2009–10	Ontario Reign	ECHL	1	0	0	0	0	—	—	—	—	—
2009–10	Manchester Monarchs	AHL	44	4	6	10	16	2	0	0	0	2
2010–11	Manchester Monarchs	AHL	67	3	17	20	32	7	0	1	1	4
2011–12	Manchester Monarchs	AHL	69	13	28	41	45	4	1	2	3	8
2012–13	Chicago Wolves	AHL	2	0	0	0	0	—	—	—	—	—
2013–14	Utica Comets	AHL	46	7	13	20	23	—	—	—	—	—
2013–14	Binghamton Senators	AHL	20	1	11	12	12	4	0	2	2	6
2014–15	Binghamton Senators	AHL	54	5	24	29	32	—	—	—	—	—
2015–16	Binghamton Senators	AHL	36	1	15	16	18	—	—	—	—	—
2015–16	Milwaukee Admirals	AHL	29	2	12	14	19	3	0	1	1	2
2016–17	Dinamo Riga	KHL	39	4	8	12	26	—	—	—	—	—
2016–17	Rochester Americans	AHL	27	4	10	14	22	—	—	—	—	—
2017–18	Linköpings HC	SHL	34	4	7	11	14	—	—	—	—	—
2017–18	Adler Mannheim	DEL	3	0	2	2	2	10	1	1	2	4
2018–19	Vienna Capitals	EBEL	29	4	21	25	9	16	0	6	6	10
2019–20	Belfast Giants	EIHL	30	5	15	20	16	—	—	—	—	—
2022	Team Mullen	3ICE	23	8	11	19	—	—	—	—	—	—
2023	Team Mullen	3ICE	6	5	2	7	—	—	—	—	—	—
AHL totals			394	40	136	176	219	20	1	6	7	22

== Awards and honors ==
Award	Year
College
All-WCHA Academic Team	2006–07; 2008–09
Lowe's Senior CLASS Award	2008–09
3ICE
Larry Murphy Best Defensive Player Award	2022
