= Tim Bothwell =

Canadian ice hockey player and coach

- Born: May 6, 1955 (age 70) Vancouver, British Columbia, Canada
- Height: 6 ft 3 in (191 cm)
- Weight: 190 lb (86 kg; 13 st 8 lb)
- Position: Defence
- Shot: Left
- Played for: New York Rangers; St. Louis Blues; Hartford Whalers
- Coached for: New Haven Nighthawks; Medicine Hat Tigers; Phoenix Roadrunners; Calgary Dinos (men); Atlanta Thrashers; Calgary Oval X-Treme; Canada; Vermont Catamounts; Calgary Inferno; Calgary Dinos (women); Denmark
- NHL draft: Undrafted
- Playing career: 1978–1990
- Coaching career: 1989–present

Timothy John Bothwell (born May 6, 1955) is a Canadian ice hockey coach and former professional ice hockey defenceman who played 502 games in the National Hockey League.

== Playing career ==
Bothwell played for the New York Rangers, St. Louis Blues, and Hartford Whalers, and several AHL teams. Before his professional career, he played at Brown, where he was a three-time All-Ivy League defenceman, member of the Bruins' 1975-76 NCAA semi-finalists, and captain of the team the next two seasons. Tim was inducted into the Brown University Athletic Hall of Fame in 1984. He retired from playing hockey in 1990.

== Coaching career ==
Bothwell's first foray into coaching was as a player-coach with the New Haven Nighthawks of the AHL in the 1989–90 season, his final as a player. Following his retirement from play, he accepted the head coaching position with the Medicine Hat Tigers in the Western Hockey League (WHL) and lead the team during the 1990–91 and 1991–92 seasons. Ahead of the 1992–93 season, he became head coach of the Phoenix Roadrunners in the International Hockey League(IHL) and remained with the team through the 1993–94 season, before moving on to the Calgary Dinos men's ice hockey team of the University of Calgary. Bothwell spent seven seasons as head coach in Calgary, 1994 to 2001, the longest period with any team of his coaching career. During his time with Calgary, he was an assistant coach to the Canadian men's ice hockey team that participated in the ice hockey tournament at the 1997 Winter Universiade. In the same year, he was honored with the Father George Kehoe Memorial Award as Canadian Intercollegiate Athletic Union (CIAU) Coach of the Year. He ultimately left Calgary to take on the role of assistant coach with the NHL's Atlanta Thrashers, which he held for two seasons, 2001–02 and 2002–03.

In 2003, he assumed an associate coach position with the Calgary Oval X-Treme of the National Women's Hockey League, his first role in women's ice hockey. He was assistant coach to the Canadian women’s national team that won gold in the women's ice hockey tournament at the 2006 Winter Olympics and to the silver medal squads at the IIHF Women's World Championship in 2005 and 2015. He served as head coach of the Vermont Catamounts women's ice hockey team during 2006 to 2012. In 2013, Bothwell became coach for the Calgary Inferno of the Canadian Women's Hockey League (CWHL).

Bothwell was the head coach of the 2014–15 Midget AAA boys team at Edge School in Calgary, Alberta, Canada.

== Personal life ==
Bothwell is the son of the late John Bothwell, the eighth bishop of the Diocese of Niagara.

== Career statistics ==
=== Regular season and playoffs ===
			Regular season					Playoffs
Season	Team	League	GP	G	A	Pts	PIM	GP	G	A	Pts	PIM
1973–74	Burlington Mohawks	CJBHL	42	22	41	63	59	—	—	—	—	—
1974–75	Brown University	ECAC	9	6	9	15	14	—	—	—	—	—
1975–76	Brown University	ECAC	29	12	22	34	30	—	—	—	—	—
1976–77	Brown University	ECAC	27	7	27	34	40	—	—	—	—	—
1977–78	Brown University	ECAC	29	9	26	35	48	—	—	—	—	—
1978–79	New York Rangers	NHL	1	0	0	0	2	—	—	—	—	—
1978–79	New Haven Nighthawks	AHL	66	15	33	48	44	10	4	6	10	8
1979–80	New York Rangers	NHL	45	4	6	10	20	9	0	0	0	8
1979–80	New Haven Nighthawks	AHL	22	6	7	13	25	—	—	—	—	—
1980–81	New York Rangers	NHL	3	0	1	1	0	—	—	—	—	—
1980–81	New Haven Nighthawks	AHL	73	10	53	63	98	4	1	2	3	6
1981–82	New York Rangers	NHL	13	0	3	3	10	—	—	—	—	—
1981–82	Springfield Indians	AHL	10	0	4	4	7	—	—	—	—	—
1982–83	St. Louis Blues	NHL	61	4	11	15	34	—	—	—	—	—
1983–84	St. Louis Blues	NHL	62	2	13	15	65	11	0	2	2	14
1983–84	Montana Magic	CHL	4	0	3	3	0	—	—	—	—	—
1984–85	St. Louis Blues	NHL	79	4	22	26	62	3	0	0	0	2
1985–86	Hartford Whalers	NHL	62	2	8	10	53	10	0	0	0	8
1986–87	Hartford Whalers	NHL	4	1	0	1	0	—	—	—	—	—
1986–87	St. Louis Blues	NHL	72	5	16	21	46	6	0	0	0	6
1987–88	St. Louis Blues	NHL	78	6	13	19	76	10	0	1	1	18
1988–89	St. Louis Blues	NHL	22	0	0	0	14	—	—	—	—	—
1988–89	Peoria Rivermen	IHL	14	0	7	7	14	—	—	—	—	—
1989–90	New Haven Nighthawks	AHL	75	3	26	29	56	—	—	—	—	—
NHL totals			502	28	93	121	382	49	0	3	3	56

== Awards and honors ==
Award	Year
All-ECAC Hockey First Team	1976–77
