= Bruce Eakin =

Canadian ice hockey player

- Born: September 28, 1962 (age 64) Winnipeg, Manitoba, Canada
- Height: 5 ft 11 in (180 cm)
- Weight: 190 lb (86 kg; 13 st 8 lb)
- Position: Centre
- Shot: Left
- Played for: Calgary Flames; Detroit Red Wings
- NHL draft: 204th overall, 1981; Calgary Flames
- Playing career: 1981–1999

Bruce Glen Eakin (born September 28, 1962) is a Canadian former professional ice hockey centre. Eakin was drafted 204th overall by the Calgary Flames in the 1981 NHL entry draft, where he played nine games. He later moved to the Detroit Red Wings where he played four games. He spent much of his time in the AHL and the CHL. He was later traded to the Edmonton Oilers in December 1985, but never played a game for the Oilers. From 1986 through till his retirement in 1999, Eakin played in Europe, including ten seasons in Germany. He also made one season stops in Switzerland, Finland and the United Kingdom.

== Career statistics ==
			Regular season					Playoffs
Season	Team	League	GP	G	A	Pts	PIM	GP	G	A	Pts	PIM
1980–81	Wisconsin	WCHA	4	1	3	4	2	—	—	—	—	—
1980–81	Saskatoon Blades	WHL	52	18	46	64	54	—	—	—	—	—
1981–82	Saskatoon Blades	WHL	66	42	125	167	120	5	4	6	10	0
1981–82	Calgary Flames	NHL	1	0	0	0	0	—	—	—	—	—
1981–82	Oklahoma City Stars	CHL	3	0	3	3	0	4	2	0	2	2
1982–83	Colorado Flames	CHL	73	24	46	70	45	6	1	6	7	2
1983–84	Calgary Flames	NHL	7	2	1	3	4	—	—	—	—	—
1983–84	Colorado Flames	CHL	67	33	69	102	18	6	4	2	6	0
1984–85	Calgary Flames	NHL	1	0	0	0	0	—	—	—	—	—
1984–85	Moncton Golden Flames	AHL	78	35	48	83	60	—	—	—	—	—
1985–86	Detroit Red Wings	NHL	4	0	1	1	0	—	—	—	—	—
1985–86	Adirondack Red Wings	AHL	25	8	10	18	23	—	—	—	—	—
1985–86	Nova Scotia Oilers	AHL	14	6	12	18	12	—	—	—	—	—
1986–87	Springfield Indians	AHL	11	0	5	5	6	—	—	—	—	—
1986–87	New Haven Nighthawks	AHL	4	1	2	3	4	—	—	—	—	—
1986–87	EHC Olten	NLA	23	12	26	38	33	—	—	—	—	—
1987–88	KalPa	Liiga	36	6	17	23	50	—	—	—	—	—
1988–89	SC Herisau	NLB	1	0	0	0	0	—	—	—	—	—
1988–89	Neusser SC	Germany2	23	18	23	41	52	—	—	—	—	—
1989–90	EHC Essen-West	Germany2	52	58	95	153	80	18	18	26	44	33
1990–91	EHC Essen-West	Germany2	49	42	69	111	72	—	—	—	—	—
1991–92	EHC 80 Nürnberg	Germany2	34	17	39	56	40	5	0	1	1	6
1992–93	Krefelder EV	Germany	42	28	34	62	84	4	1	2	3	6
1993–94	Krefelder EV	Germany	44	20	28	48	80	6	1	4	5	8
1994–95	Düsseldorfer EG	DEL	19	5	5	10	4	10	2	10	12	18
1995–96	Düsseldorfer EG	DEL	10	0	0	0	8	—	—	—	—	—
1995–96	Kassel Huskies	DEL	38	15	21	36	44	8	3	5	8	4
1996–97	Kassel Huskies	DEL	49	13	34	47	38	10	2	7	9	24
1997–98	Kassel Huskies	DEL	45	10	22	32	69	4	1	2	3	4
1998–99	London Knights	BISL	11	3	12	15	22	—	—	—	—	—
NHL totals			13	2	2	4	4	—	—	—	—	—
DEL totals			161	43	82	125	163	32	8	24	32	50

== Awards ==
- WHL First All-Star Team – 1982
