= Brad Turner (ice hockey) =

Canadian ice hockey player

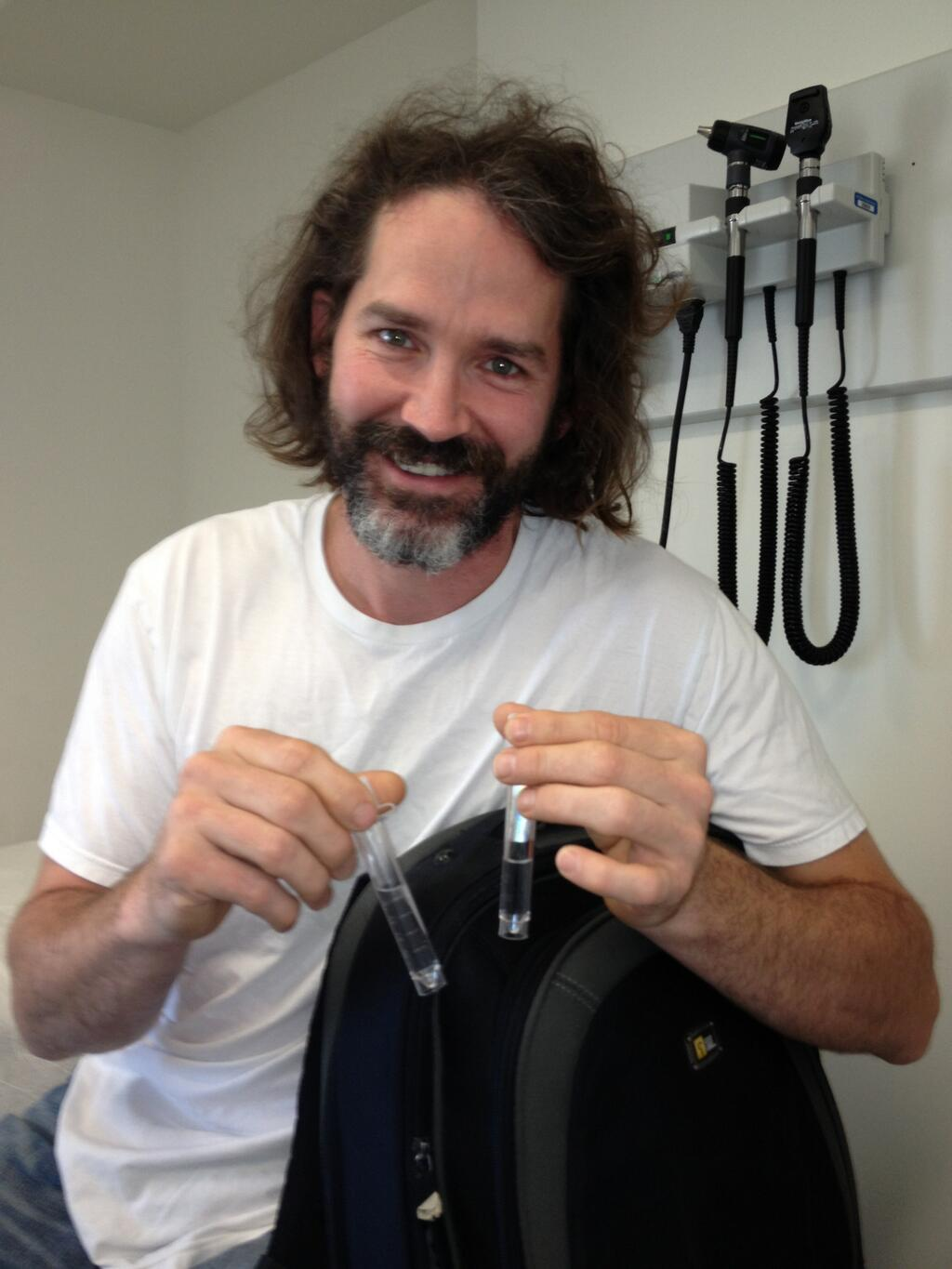
- Born: May 25, 1968 (age 58) Winnipeg, Manitoba, Canada
- Height: 6 ft 0 in (183 cm)
- Weight: 192 lb (87 kg; 13 st 10 lb)
- Position: Defence
- Shot: Right
- Played for: New York Islanders
- National team: Canada
- NHL draft: 58th overall, 1986; Minnesota North Stars
- Playing career: 1990–1998

Brad Turner (born May 25, 1968) is a Canadian retired ice hockey player, who played 3 games in the National Hockey League with the New York Islanders during the 1991–92 season. The rest of his career, which lasted from 1990 to 1998, was spent in the minor leagues and in Europe.

== Playing career ==
Turner was born in Winnipeg, Manitoba. As a youth, he played in the 1981 Quebec International Pee-Wee Hockey Tournament with a minor ice hockey team from Calgary.

Turner was drafted 58th overall by the Minnesota North Stars in the 1986 NHL entry draft and played three games for the New York Islanders in the 1991–92 NHL season.

== Post-playing career ==
Turner currently works in the film industry as an actor and stunt performer. His roles include Vic Duguay in the 2004 hockey comedy-drama Chicks with Sticks. He has been an active supporter of research on long-term sequelae of traumatic brain injury.

== Career statistics ==
=== Regular season and playoffs ===
			Regular season					Playoffs
Season	Team	League	GP	G	A	Pts	PIM	GP	G	A	Pts	PIM
1985–86	Calgary Canucks	AJHL	52	14	21	35	109	—	—	—	—	—
1986–87	University of Michigan	CCHA	40	3	10	13	40	—	—	—	—	—
1987–88	University of Michigan	CCHA	39	3	11	14	52	—	—	—	—	—
1988–89	University of Michigan	CCHA	33	3	8	11	38	—	—	—	—	—
1989–90	University of Michigan	CCHA	32	8	9	17	34	—	—	—	—	—
1990–91	Capital District Islanders	AHL	31	1	2	3	8	—	—	—	—	—
1990–91	Richmond Renegades	ECHL	40	16	25	41	31	—	—	—	—	—
1991–92	New Haven Nighthawks	AHL	32	6	11	17	58	—	—	—	—	—
1991–92	New York Islanders	NHL	3	0	0	0	0	—	—	—	—	—
1991–92	Capital District Islanders	AHL	35	3	6	9	17	—	—	—	—	—
1992–93	Capital District Islanders	AHL	65	8	11	19	71	3	0	0	0	2
1993–94	Cornwall Aces	AHL	29	3	13	16	19	4	1	1	2	4
1993–94	Canadian National Team	Intl	30	6	9	15	21	—	—	—	—	—
1994–95	TuTo	FIN	43	3	9	12	114	—	—	—	—	—
1995–96	CE Wien	AUT	31	7	14	21	100	—	—	—	—	—
1996–97	Manchester Storm	BISL	21	3	8	11	12	6	2	0	2	4
1997–98	Manchester Storm	BISL	11	1	1	2	4	—	—	—	—	—
AHL totals			192	21	43	64	173	7	1	1	2	6
NHL totals			3	0	0	0	0	—	—	—	—	—
