= Tony Stiles =

Canadian ice hockey player

- Born: August 12, 1959 (age 65); Carstairs, Alberta, Canada
- Height: 5 ft 11 in (180 cm)
- Weight: 208 lb (94 kg; 14 st 12 lb)
- Position: Defence
- Shot: Left
- Played for: Calgary Flames
- National team: Canada
- NHL draft: Undrafted
- Playing career: 1982–1990

Anthony Stiles (born August 12, 1959) is a Canadian retired professional ice hockey player. He played 30 games in the National Hockey League with the Calgary Flames in the 1983–84 season, recording two goals and seven assists. Stiles signed as a free agent with the Flames in 1982. He retired in 1990 after spending two seasons in Germany.

Stiles was a member of the fourth place Canadian team at the 1988 Winter Olympics in Calgary.

== Career statistics ==
=== Regular season and playoffs ===
			Regular season					Playoffs
Season	Team	League	GP	G	A	Pts	PIM	GP	G	A	Pts	PIM
1976–77	Calgary Canucks	AJHL	56	3	8	11	4	—	—	—	—	—
1977–78	Calgary Canucks	AJHL	59	7	29	36	73	—	—	—	—	—
1978–79	Michigan Tech University	WCHA	32	8	9	17	31	—	—	—	—	—
1979–80	Michigan Tech University	WCHA	29	1	12	13	34	—	—	—	—	—
1980–81	Michigan Tech University	WCHA	44	10	20	30	58	—	—	—	—	—
1981–82	Michigan Tech University	WCHA	38	7	14	21	26	—	—	—	—	—
1982–83	Colorado Flames	CHL	58	2	7	9	53	1	0	0	0	0
1983–84	Calgary Flames	NHL	30	2	7	9	20	—	—	—	—	—
1983–84	Colorado Flames	CHL	39	3	18	21	24	1	0	0	0	0
1984–85	Moncton Golden Flames	AHL	79	5	9	14	46	—	—	—	—	—
1985–86	Moncton Golden Flames	AHL	20	0	2	2	18	—	—	—	—	—
1985–86	Fredericton Express	AHL	9	0	1	1	9	—	—	—	—	—
1985–86	Canadian National Team	Intl	11	1	1	2	6	—	—	—	—	—
1986–87	Canadian National Team	Intl	70	4	18	22	58	—	—	—	—	—
1987–88	Canadian National Team	Intl	63	0	8	8	44	—	—	—	—	—
1988–89	EC Bad Tölz	GER-2	35	18	33	51	54	—	—	—	—	—
1989–90	EC Bad Tölz	GER-2	35	13	23	36	26	—	—	—	—	—
AHL totals			108	5	12	17	73	—	—	—	—	—
NHL totals			30	2	7	9	20	—	—	—	—	—

=== International ===
Year	Team	Event	GP	G	A	Pts	PIM
1988	Canada	OLY	5	0	0	0	0
Senior totals			5	0	0	0	0
