= Terry Johnson (ice hockey) =

Canadian ice hockey player

- Born: November 28, 1958 (age 66) Calgary, Alberta, Canada
- Height: 6 ft 3 in (191 cm)
- Weight: 210 lb (95 kg; 15 st 0 lb)
- Position: Defence
- Shot: Left
- Played for: Quebec Nordiques; St. Louis Blues; Calgary Flames; Toronto Maple Leafs
- NHL draft: Undrafted
- Playing career: 1979–1988

Terry Johnson (born November 28, 1958 in Calgary, Alberta) is a Canadian former professional ice hockey defenceman who played 285 regular season and 38 playoff games in the National Hockey League with the Quebec Nordiques, St. Louis Blues, Calgary Flames, and Toronto Maple Leafs between 1979 and 1988.

== Playing career ==
Johnson played a physical, defensive game. At 16 years of age, Johnson joined the Calgary Canucks of the Alberta Junior Hockey League (AJHL) in 1975. After two seasons in Calgary, he moved on to the Saskatoon Blades in the Western Canada Hockey League (WCHL) for the 1977–78 season. Johnson then joined the University of Calgary Dinos for the 1978–79 season, where he played for one year in the Canadian Interuniversity Sport (CIS) league, now U Sports.

Johnson made his NHL debut with the Quebec Nordiques during the 1979–80 season. He went on to play for the Nordiques in parts of four seasons. During this time, Johnson also played in the American Hockey League (AHL) for the Syracuse Firebirds (1979-1980), Hershey Bears (1980-1981), and Fredericton Express (1981-1983).

Johnson was acquired by the St. Louis Blues in the 1983 waiver draft. After two seasons with the franchise, Johnson was named assistant captain for the St. Louis Blues in 1985. In 1986, he was traded to the Calgary Flames, where he contributed to the franchise's first-ever conference championship.

== Coaching career ==
When his professional hockey career came to an end in 1988, Johnson returned to the University of Calgary and obtained a Bachelor of Commerce degree in 1991. He served as an assistant coach for the University of Calgary Dinos men's hockey team from 1989-1995, coaching the team to two division championships (Canada West 1990, 1995) alongside Willie Desjardins and Tim Bothwell.

Johnson coached minor hockey from 2004- 2019, following his two daughters from Timbits through to Midget AAA with Girls Hockey Calgary.

== 3RD ASSIST Club ==
In 2020, Johnson co-founded the 3RD ASSIST Club, a University of Calgary Men's Hockey alumni group created to provide ongoing support for the Dinos Men's Hockey program. As the club's current president, Johnson plays a key role in overseeing the engagement and building of a network among alumni and supporters, fundraising, supporting student athletes, and enhancing the team's development.

The 3RD ASSIST Club also introduced the "Connect Program," an outstanding initiative that connects current University of Calgary men's hockey players with alumni in a variety of different industries. Alumni serve as mentors to the student-athletes, leveraging their own experiences and networks to offer opportunities and guidance. The Connect Program reflects the 3RD ASSIST Club's desire to support student-athletes, ensuring they are set up for success during their time as Dinos and beyond.

While the primary goal of the 3rd Assist Club is to support the student-athletes and the current Dinos team, it also brings together old teammates and coaches, fostering a stronger sense of community and pride within the Dinos program.

== Career statistics ==
=== Regular season and playoffs ===
			Regular season					Playoffs
Season	Team	League	GP	G	A	Pts	PIM	GP	G	A	Pts	PIM
1975–76	Calgary Canucks	AJHL	55	3	13	16	100	—	—	—	—	—
1976–77	Calgary Canucks	AJHL	60	5	26	31	158	—	—	—	—	—
1977–78	Saskatoon Blades	WCHL	70	2	20	22	195	—	—	—	—	—
1978–79	University of Calgary	CIAU	24	2	4	6	81	3	1	0	1	2
1979–80	Quebec Nordiques	NHL	3	0	0	0	2	—	—	—	—	—
1979–80	Syracuse Firebirds	AHL	74	0	13	13	163	4	0	0	0	7
1980–81	Quebec Nordiques	NHL	13	0	1	1	46	2	0	0	0	0
1980–81	Hershey Bears	AHL	63	1	7	8	207	9	0	1	1	14
1981–82	Quebec Nordiques	NHL	6	0	1	1	5	—	—	—	—	—
1981–82	Fredericton Express	AHL	43	0	7	7	132	—	—	—	—	—
1982–83	Quebec Nordiques	NHL	3	0	0	0	2	—	—	—	—	—
1982–83	Fredericton Express	AHL	78	2	15	17	181	12	1	1	2	12
1983–84	St. Louis Blues	NHL	65	2	6	8	143	11	0	1	1	25
1984–85	St. Louis Blues	NHL	74	0	7	7	120	3	0	0	0	19
1985–86	St. Louis Blues	NHL	49	0	4	4	87	—	—	—	—	—
1985–86	Calgary Flames	NHL	24	1	4	5	71	17	0	3	3	64
1986–87	Toronto Maple Leafs	NHL	48	0	1	1	104	2	0	0	0	0
1986–87	Newmarket Saints	AHL	24	0	1	1	37	—	—	—	—	—
1987–88	Toronto Maple Leafs	NHL	—	—	—	—	—	3	0	0	0	10
1987–88	Newmarket Saints	AHL	72	3	3	6	174	—	—	—	—	—
AHL totals			354	6	46	52	894	25	1	2	3	33
NHL totals			285	3	24	27	580	38	0	4	4	118
