= Tom McMurchy =

Canadian ice hockey player

- Born: December 2, 1963 (age 61); New Westminster, British Columbia, Canada
- Height: 5 ft 11 in (180 cm)
- Weight: 180 lb (82 kg; 12 st 12 lb)
- Position: Left wing
- Shot: Left
- Played for: Chicago Black Hawks; Edmonton Oilers; HC Fiemme Cavalese
- NHL draft: 49th overall, 1982; Chicago Black Hawks
- Playing career: 1983–1993

Tom McMurchy (born December 2, 1963) is a Canadian former professional ice hockey winger. He played 55 games in the National Hockey League for the Chicago Black Hawks and the Edmonton Oilers between 1983 and 1987. The rest of his career, which lasted from 1983 to 1993, was mainly spent in the minor leagues.

== Career statistics ==
=== Regular season and playoffs ===
			Regular season					Playoffs
Season	Team	League	GP	G	A	Pts	PIM	GP	G	A	Pts	PIM
1979–80	Bellingham Blazers	BCHL	—	—	—	—	—	—	—	—	—	—
1980–81	Medicine Hat Tigers	WHL	14	5	0	5	46	—	—	—	—	—
1980–81	Brandon Wheat Kings	WHL	46	20	33	53	101	5	2	2	4	4
1981–82	Brandon Wheat Kings	WHL	68	59	63	122	179	4	7	3	10	4
1982–83	Brandon Wheat Kings	WHL	42	43	38	81	48	—	—	—	—	—
1982–83	Springfield Indians	AHL	8	2	2	4	0	—	—	—	—	—
1983–84	Chicago Black Hawks	NHL	27	3	1	4	42	—	—	—	—	—
1983–84	Springfield Indians	AHL	43	16	14	30	54	4	4	0	4	0
1984–85	Chicago Black Hawks	NHL	15	1	2	3	13	—	—	—	—	—
1984–85	Milwaukee Admirals	IHL	69	30	26	56	61	—	—	—	—	—
1985–86	Chicago Black Hawks	NHL	4	0	0	0	2	—	—	—	—	—
1985–86	Nova Scotia Oilers	AHL	49	26	21	47	73	—	—	—	—	—
1985–86	Moncton Golden Flames	AHL	16	7	3	10	27	2	0	1	1	6
1986–87	Nova Scotia Oilers	AHL	67	21	35	56	99	4	3	2	5	4
1987–88	Edmonton Oilers	NHL	9	4	1	5	8	—	—	—	—	—
1987–88	Nova Scotia Oilers	AHL	61	40	21	61	132	3	2	1	3	4
1988–89	EHC Bülach	NLB	27	30	19	49	95	—	—	—	—	—
1988–89	Halifax Citadels	AHL	11	10	3	13	18	3	0	2	2	2
1989–90	HC Fiemme Cavalese	ITA	33	54	46	100	62	10	18	30	48	18
1990–91	HC Fiemme Cavalese	ITA	29	22	26	48	56	—	—	—	—	—
1991–92	SG Cortina	ITA-2	31	53	26	79	79	—	—	—	—	—
1992–93	SG Cortina	ITA-2	—	—	—	—	—	—	—	—	—	—
AHL totals			255	122	99	211	403	16	9	6	15	16
NHL totals			55	8	4	12	65	—	—	—	—	—
