= Montana Magic =

- City: Billings, Montana
- League: Central Hockey League
- Operated: 1983–1984
- Home arena: Montana Entertainment Trade and Recreation Arena
- Affiliates: St. Louis Blues; Edmonton Oilers

The Montana Magic were a minor professional ice hockey team that played in Billings, Montana, as a member of the defunct Central Hockey League (CHL) in the 1983–84 season. They filled the void left by the departure of the major junior Billings Bighorns in 1982. After their first and only season in the CHL, posting a 20–52–4 record and missing the playoffs, the league folded and the team consequently disbanded. They would be replaced in 1985 by the semi-professional Billings Marlboros of the Continental Hockey League, a league that also folded after the Billings team played in only one season in 1986.

As a minor league team, the Magic served as a National Hockey League affiliate whose parent teams were the St. Louis Blues and Edmonton Oilers. Notable players for the Magic included Reggie Leach, Blair MacDonald, Don Murdoch, Stan Weir, and Alain Vigneault.

== Season-by-season record ==
Note: GP = Games played, W = Wins, L = Losses, T = Ties, Pts = Points, GF = Goals for, GA = Goals against, PIM = Penalties in minutes

| Season | GP | W | L | T | Pts | GF | GA | PIM | Finish | Playoffs |
|---|---|---|---|---|---|---|---|---|---|---|
| 1983–84 | 76 | 20 | 52 | 4 | 44 | 276 | 381 | 1361 | 5th | Did not qualify |
