= Ed Beers =

Canadian ice hockey player

- Born: October 12, 1959 (age 66) Zwaag, Netherlands
- Height: 6 ft 2 in (188 cm)
- Weight: 195 lb (88 kg; 13 st 13 lb)
- Position: Left wing
- Shot: Left
- Played for: Calgary Flames; St. Louis Blues
- NHL draft: Undrafted
- Playing career: 1982–1986

Edward Joseph "Eddy" Beers (born October 12, 1959) is a Dutch-born Canadian former professional ice hockey winger who played 250 games in the National Hockey League (NHL) with the Calgary Flames and St. Louis Blues between 1982 and 1986. He was nearly a point per game player in his time in the NHL, but his NHL career was cut short by injury.

== Playing career ==
Born in Zwaag, Netherlands, Beers played for the Calgary Flames and St. Louis Blues. He also played for the University of Denver in the NCAA from 1979 to 1982 and led the NCAA in scoring his senior season. In 1982, Beers became the second player born in the Netherlands to play in the NHL. A back injury suffered in preseason camp of 1986 led to Beers retiring.

== Career statistics ==
=== Regular season and playoffs ===
			Regular season					Playoffs
Season	Team	League	GP	G	A	Pts	PIM	GP	G	A	Pts	PIM
1976–77	Merritt Centennials	BCJHL	30	12	7	19	138	—	—	—	—	—
1977–78	Merritt Centennials	BCJHL	63	54	61	115	100	—	—	—	—	—
1978–79	Merritt Centennials	BCJHL	—	—	—	—	—	—	—	—	—	—
1978–79	University of Denver	WCHA	19	6	7	13	37	—	—	—	—	—
1979–80	University of Denver	WCHA	36	13	20	33	24	—	—	—	—	—
1980–81	University of Denver	WCHA	39	24	15	39	63	—	—	—	—	—
1981–82	University of Denver	WCHA	42	50	34	84	59	—	—	—	—	—
1981–82	Calgary Flames	NHL	5	1	1	2	21	—	—	—	—	—
1982–83	Calgary Flames	NHL	41	11	15	26	21	8	1	1	2	27
1982–83	Colorado Flames	CHL	29	12	17	29	52	—	—	—	—	—
1983–84	Calgary Flames	NHL	73	36	39	75	88	11	2	5	7	12
1984–85	Calgary Flames	NHL	74	28	40	68	94	3	1	0	1	0
1985–86	Calgary Flames	NHL	33	11	10	21	8	—	—	—	—	—
1985–86	St. Louis Blues	NHL	24	7	11	18	24	19	3	4	7	8
NHL totals			250	94	116	210	256	41	7	10	17	47

== Awards and honours ==
Award	Year
All-WCHA First Team	1981–82

Awards and achievements
Preceded by Aaron Broten	NCAA Ice Hockey Scoring Champion; 1981–82	Succeeded by Brian Hills
