= Charlie Bourgeois =

Canadian ice hockey player

- Born: November 19, 1959 (age 66) Moncton, New Brunswick, Canada
- Height: 6 ft 4 in (193 cm)
- Weight: 223 lb (101 kg; 15 st 13 lb)
- Position: Defence
- Shot: Right
- Played for: Calgary Flames; St. Louis Blues; Hartford Whalers
- NHL draft: Undrafted
- Playing career: 1981–1993

Charles Marc "Boo-Boo" Bourgeois (born November 19, 1959) is a Canadian former professional ice hockey defenceman who played 290 games in the National Hockey League. He played for the Calgary Flames, St. Louis Blues, and Hartford Whalers.

In the early 1980s, Bourgeois played for the Université de Moncton hockey team. He helped lead the team to the Canadian Interuniversity Sport championship in his final year of university. That year, he was named all-Canadian as one of the two best university defencemen in Canada.

Bourgeois led the Moncton Hawks to the Calder Cup finals, as a coach during the 1993–94 AHL season. He also coached the Universite de Moncton hockey team for several years, and guided the team to the Atlantic university championship a few years ago. He also played two years of professional hockey in Europe.

Bourgeois operates a summer hockey school in Moncton, and he is president of Atlantic Hockey Group, which works with over 10,000 youth and adult hockey players each year. He is dedicated to helping kids improve their hockey skills. Bourgeois has conducted special hockey camps for children from Asia.

On December 13, 1974, Charlie’s father Cpl Aurèle Bourgeois (age 47) and Constable Michael O’Leary (age 33) of the Moncton Police Force were murdered after being forced to dig their own graves.

== Career statistics ==
=== Regular season and playoffs ===
			Regular season					Playoffs
Season	Team	League	GP	G	A	Pts	PIM	GP	G	A	Pts	PIM
1977–78	Dieppe Voyageurs	SNBHL	—	—	—	—	—	—	—	—	—	—
1978–79	Université de Moncton	CIAU	18	3	3	6	8	—	—	—	—	—
1979–80	Cap Pele Fishermen	MJrHL	—	—	—	—	—	—	—	—	—	—
1980–81	Université de Moncton	CIAU	24	8	23	31	44	6	4	6	10	—
1981–82	Calgary Flames	NHL	54	2	13	15	112	3	0	0	0	7
1981–82	Oklahoma City Stars	CHL	13	2	2	4	17	—	—	—	—	—
1982–83	Calgary Flames	NHL	15	2	3	5	21	—	—	—	—	—
1982–83	Colorado Flames	CHL	51	10	18	28	128	6	2	3	5	30
1983–84	Calgary Flames	NHL	17	1	3	4	35	8	0	1	1	27
1983–84	Colorado Flames	CHL	54	12	32	44	133	—	—	—	—	—
1984–85	Calgary Flames	NHL	47	2	10	12	134	4	0	0	0	17
1985–86	Calgary Flames	NHL	29	5	5	10	128	—	—	—	—	—
1985–86	St. Louis Blues	NHL	31	2	7	9	116	19	2	2	4	116
1986–87	St. Louis Blues	NHL	66	2	12	14	164	6	0	0	0	27
1987–88	St. Louis Blues	NHL	30	0	1	1	78	—	—	—	—	—
1987–88	Hartford Whalers	NHL	1	0	0	0	0	—	—	—	—	—
1988–89	Binghamton Whalers	AHL	76	9	35	44	239	—	—	—	—	—
1989–90	Français Volants	FRA	36	17	21	38	122	4	2	1	3	10
1990–91	Chamonix HC	FRA-2	11	3	7	10	36	—	—	—	—	—
1991–92	Moncton Hawks	AHL	3	0	1	1	6	—	—	—	—	—
NHL totals			290	16	54	70	788	40	2	3	5	194
