= 2006 Calder Cup playoffs =

North American ice hockey tournament

Tournament details
- Dates: April 18 – June 15, 2006
- Teams: 16

Final positions
- Champions: Hershey Bears
- Runners-up: Milwaukee Admirals

The 2006 Calder Cup playoffs of the American Hockey League began on April 18, 2006. The sixteen teams that qualified, eight from each conference, played best-of-seven series for division semifinals, finals and conference finals. The conference champions played a best-of-seven series for the Calder Cup. The Calder Cup Final ended on June 15, 2006, with the Hershey Bears defeating the Milwaukee Admirals four games to two to win the ninth Calder Cup in team history.

Milwaukee's Darren Haydar set an AHL post-season record by scoring 6 game-winning goals in a single playoff. Hershey's Frederic Cassivi tied an AHL record by recording 16 wins in one playoff. He also won the Jack A. Butterfield Trophy as AHL Playoff MVP.

== Playoff seeds ==
After the 2005–06 AHL regular season, 16 teams qualified for the playoffs. The top four teams from each division qualified for the playoffs. However, it was possible for the fifth-placed team in the Atlantic Division to take the spot of the fourth-placed team in the East Division if they earned more points, since the East Division had one fewer team. This did not occur as the Bridgeport Sound Tigers, the fourth-placed team in the East Division finished with 85 points while the Lowell Lock Monsters, the fifth-placed team in the Atlantic Division, finished with 72 points. The Grand Rapids Griffins were the Western Conference regular season champions as well as the Macgregor Kilpatrick Trophy winners with the best overall regular season record. The Portland Pirates were the Eastern Conference regular season champions.

=== Eastern Conference ===
==== Atlantic Division ====
1. Portland Pirates – Eastern Conference regular season champions, 114 points
2. Hartford Wolf Pack – 104 points
3. Manchester Monarchs – 93 points
4. Providence Bruins – 92 points

==== East Division ====
1. Wilkes-Barre/Scranton Penguins – 113 points
2. Hershey Bears – 103 points
3. Norfolk Admirals – 94 points
4. Bridgeport Sound Tigers – 85 points

=== Western Conference ===
==== North Division ====
1. Grand Rapids Griffins – Western Conference regular season champions; Macgregor Kilpatrick Trophy winners, 115 points
2. Syracuse Crunch – 102 points
3. Manitoba Moose – 100 points
4. Toronto Marlies – 92 points

==== West Division ====
1. Milwaukee Admirals – 108 points
2. Houston Aeros – 106 points
3. Peoria Rivermen – 100 points
4. Iowa Stars – 90 points

== Bracket ==
Division Semifinals	Division Finals
A1	Portland	4
A4	Providence	2
A1	Portland	4
Atlantic Division
A2	Hartford	2
A3	Hartford	4
A2	Manchester	3
Eastern Conference
E1	Wilkes-Barre/Scranton	4
E4	Bridgeport	3
E1	Wilkes-Barre/Scranton	0
East Division
E2	Hershey	4
E2	Hershey	4
E3	Norfolk	0
N1	Grand Rapids	4
N4	Toronto	1
N1	Grand Rapids	4
North Division
N3	Manitoba	3
N2	Syracuse	2
N3	Manitoba	4
Western Conference
W1	Milwaukee	4
W4	Iowa	3
W1	Milwaukee	4
West Division
W2	Houston	0
W2	Houston	4
W3	Peoria	0

Conference Finals
A1	Portland	3
E2	Hershey	4
N1	Grand Rapids	0
W1	Milwaukee	4

Calder Cup Finals
E2	Hershey	4
W1	Milwaukee	2

In each round the higher seed receives home ice advantage, meaning they can play a maximum of four home games if the series reaches seven games. There is no set series format for each series due to arena scheduling conflicts and travel considerations.

== Division Semifinals ==
=== Eastern Conference ===
==== Atlantic Division ====
===== (A1) Portland Pirates vs. (A4) Providence Bruins =====
April 20	Providence Bruins	0 – 6	Portland Pirates	Cumberland County Civic Center	Recap
No scoring		First period	04:23 - Simon Ferguson (1); 06:43 - pp - Kent Huskins (1); 13:09 - pp - Maxim Kondratiev (1); 18:36 - Curtis Glencross (1)
No scoring		Second period	14:09 - pp Zenon Konopka (1)
No scoring		Third period	08:08 - pp - Zenon Konopka (2)
Derek Gustafson 8 saves / 12 shots Jordan Sigalet 20 saves / 22 shots		Goalie stats	Jani Hurme 19 saves / 19 shots

April 22	Providence Bruins	2 – 3	Portland Pirates	Cumberland County Civic Center	Recap
Ben Walter (1) - pp - 15:44		First period	No scoring
No scoring		Second period	12:09 - Shane O'Brien (1); 15:01 - pp - Dustin Penner (1)
Ben Walter (2) - 10:04		Third period	00:56 - pp - Maxim Kondratiev (2)
Jordan Sigalet 31 saves / 34 shots		Goalie stats	Jani Hurme 28 saves / 30 shots

April 23	Portland Pirates	5 – 4	Providence Bruins	Dunkin' Donuts Center	Recap
Curtis Glencross (2) - sh - 05:41		First period	01:39 - Nathan Robinson (1); 06:06 - pp - Nathan Robinson (2)
Shane O'Brien (2) - pp - 10:49		Second period	01:23 - Jason MacDonald (1)
Maxim Kondratiev (3) - 02:33; Maxim Kondratiev - pp - (4); P. A. Parenteau (1) - 10:14		Third period	09:51 - pp - Ben Guite (1)
Jani Hurme 21 saves / 25 shots		Goalie stats	Jordan Sigalet 24 saves / 29 shots

April 25	Portland Pirates	4 – 5	OT	Providence Bruins	Dunkin' Donuts Center	Recap
Geoff Peters (1) - 02:30		First period		09:34 - pp - Jonathan Sigalet (1); 18:12 - Nathan Robinson (3)
Zenon Konopka (3) - 03:16		Second period		11:45 - Pascal Pelletier (1)
Dustin Penner (2) - 02:12; Simon Ferguson (2) - 17:13		Third period		13:13 - pp - Ryan Gaucher (1)
No scoring		First overtime period		03:51 - Nathan Robinson (4)
Jani Hurme 21 saves / 26 shots		Goalie stats		Derek Gustafson 25 saves / 29 shots

April 27	Providence Bruins	5 – 4	OT	Portland Pirates	Cumberland County Civic Center	Recap
Tyler Redenbach (1) - sh - 10:46; Pascal Pelletier (1) - 19:44		First period		07:28 - Aaron Rome (1)
Eric Healey (1) - pp, ps - 09:18		Second period		06:00 - Zenon Konopka (4); 08:51 - sh - Shane O'Brien (3); 10:11 - pp - Kent Huskins (2)
No scoring		Third period		No scoring
Eric Healey (2) - pp - 08:58		First overtime period		No scoring
Derek Gustafson 32 saves / 36 shots		Goalie stats		Jani Hurme 28 saves / 33 shots

April 28	Portland Pirates	5 – 2	Providence Bruins	Dunkin' Donuts Center	Recap
Zenon Konopka (5) - pp - 07:54		First period	09:53 - pp - Eric Nickulas (1)
Geoff Peters (2) - 02:21; Zenon Konopka (6) - pp - 07:23; Ryan Shannon (1) - sh - 15:12		Second period	No scoring
Ryan Shannon (2) - pp - 16:35		Third period	19:16 - pp - Jonathan Sigalet (2)
Nathan Marsters 20 saves / 22 shots		Goalie stats	Derek Gustafson 24 saves / 29 shots

Portland won series 4 – 2

===== (A2) Hartford Wolf Pack vs. (A3) Manchester Monarchs =====
April 18	Manchester Monarchs	1 – 0	Hartford Wolf Pack	Hartford Civic Center	Recap
No scoring		First period	No scoring
Alexandre Daigle (1) - 11:46		Second period	No scoring
No scoring		Third period	No scoring
Barry Brust 39 saves / 39 shots		Goalie stats	Al Montoya 25 saves / 26 shots

April 19	Manchester Monarchs	2 – 3	OT	Hartford Wolf Pack	Hartford Civic Center	Recap
No scoring		First period		08:43 - pp - Nigel Dawes (1)
Mark Ardelan (1) - pp - 18:58		Second period		No scoring
Richard Petiot (1) - 09:27		Third period		07:42 - Chad Wiseman (1)
No scoring		First overtime period		16:47 - Martin Sonnenberg (1)
Barry Brust 40 saves / 43 shots		Goalie stats		Al Montoya 33 saves / 35 shots

April 21	Hartford Wolf Pack	5 – 6	2OT	Manchester Monarchs	Verizon Wireless Arena	Recap
Dwight Helminen (1) - pp - 02:42; Dan Girardi (1) - pp - 03:28		First period		09:00 - Konstantin Pushkarev (1); 15:06 - pp - Noah Clarke (1)
No scoring		Second period		04:59 - Petr Kanko (1)
Nigel Dawes (2) - 06:21; Alexandre Giroux (1) - pp - 12:03; Brad Smyth (1) - 19:01		Third period		01:58 - pp - Noah Clarke (2); 04:45 - Jeff Giuliano (1)
No scoring		Second overtime period		01:46 - Jeff Giuliano (2)
Al Montoya 16 saves / 20 shots Robert Gherson 9 saves / 11 shots		Goalie stats		Barry Brust 45 saves / 50 shots

April 23	Hartford Wolf Pack	7 – 0	Manchester Monarchs	Verizon Wireless Arena	Recap
Colby Genoway (1) - 08:55		First period	No scoring
Nigel Dawes (3) - pp - 06:02; Colby Genoway (2) - 07:53; Dan Girardi (2) - pp - 13:31		Second period	No scoring
Brandon Dubinsky (1) - pp - 02:15; Nigel Dawes (4) - 09:09; Brandon Dubinsky (2) - pp - 14:02		Third period	No scoring
Al Montoya 30 saves / 30 shots		Goalie stats	Barry Brust 27 saves / 34 shots

April 25	Manchester Monarchs	8 – 6	Hartford Wolf Pack	Hartford Civic Center	Recap
Alexandre Daigle (2) - 17:00		First period	0:21 - Martin Sonnenberg (1); 0:46 - Brandon Dubinsky (3); 05:32 - pp - Craig Weller (1); 13:55 - Craig Weller (2)
Ned Lukacevic (1) - 04:19; Mark Ardelan (2) - pp - 05:17; Noah Clarke (3) - pp - 10:54		Second period	11:25 - Brandon Dubinsky (4); 14:23 - Alexandre Giroux (2)
Noah Clarke (4) - 03:15; Alexandre Daigle (3) - pp - 04:31; Matt Ryan (1) - 13:46; Jeff Giuliano (3) - 16:36		Third period	No scoring
Barry Brust 0 saves / 2 shots Adam Hauser 32 saves / 36 shots		Goalie stats	Al Montoya 5 saves / 6 shots Robert Gherson 16 saves / 23 shots

April 27	Hartford Wolf Pack	3 – 1	Manchester Monarchs	Verizon Wireless Arena	Recap
Colby Genoway (3) - 08:48; Greg Moore (1) - 12:46		First period	No scoring
Chad Wiseman (2) - 11:49		Second period	11:46 - Alexandre Daigle (4)
No scoring		Third period	No scoring
Chris Holt 29 saves / 30 shots		Goalie stats	Adam Hauser 29 saves / 32 shots

April 29	Manchester Monarchs	1 – 2	Hartford Wolf Pack	Hartford Civic Center	Recap
Dany Roussin (1) - 11:47		First period	03:42 - Martin Sonnenberg (3)
No scoring		Second period	No scoring
No scoring		Third period	06:16 - Alexandre Giroux (3)
Adam Hauser 34 saves / 36 shots		Goalie stats	Chris Holt 26 saves / 27 shots

Hartford won series 4 – 3

==== East Division ====
===== (E1) Wilkes-Barre/Scranton Penguins vs. (E4) Bridgeport Sound Tigers =====
April 20	Bridgeport Sound Tigers	2 – 1	Wilkes-Barre/Scranton Penguins	Wachovia Arena at Casey Plaza	Recap
No scoring		First period	No scoring
Robert Nilsson (1) - 01:45; Rob Collins (1) - 10:49		Second period	11:15 - Jonathan Filewich (1)
No scoring		Third period	No scoring
Wade Dubielewicz 24 saves / 25 shots		Goalie stats	Dany Sabourin 23 saves / 25 shots

April 22	Bridgeport Sound Tigers	3 – 2	Wilkes-Barre/Scranton Penguins	Wachovia Arena at Casey Plaza	Recap
No scoring		First period	No scoring
Jeff Tambellini (1) - 01:45; Rob Collins (2) - pp - 08:19; Masi Marjamaki (1) - 09:44		Second period	15:00 - pp - Jonathan Filewich (2)
No scoring		Third period	13:47 - sh - Shane Endicott (1)
Wade Dubielewicz 41 saves / 43 shots		Goalie stats	Marc-Andre Fleury 22 saves / 25 shots

April 23	Wilkes-Barre/Scranton Penguins	3 – 2	OT	Bridgeport Sound Tigers	Arena at Harbor Yard	Recap
No scoring		First period		02:48 - pp - Rob Collins (3)
Krys Kolanos (1) - pp - 06:24		Second period		Denis Grebeshkov (1) - 12:18
00:28 - Ryan Stone (1)		Third period		No scoring
Matt Hussey (1) - 01:12		First overtime period		No scoring
Dany Sabourin 23 saves / 25 shots		Goalie stats		Wade Dubielewicz 28 saves / 31 shots

April 25	Wilkes-Barre/Scranton Penguins	1 – 0	Bridgeport Sound Tigers	Arena at Harbor Yard	Recap
No scoring		First period	No scoring
Maxime Talbot (1) - 19:27		Second period	No scoring
No scoring		Third period	No scoring
Dany Sabourin 33 saves / 33 shots		Goalie stats	Wade Dubielewicz 25 saves / 26 shots

April 26	Bridgeport Sound Tigers	3 – 2	OT	Wilkes-Barre/Scranton Penguins	Wachovia Arena at Casey Plaza	Recap
No scoring		First period		0:34 - Jonathan Filewich (2)
Ryan Caldwell (1) - pp - 07:15		Second period		04:13 - Krys Kolanos (2)
Matt Koalska (1) - 07:11		Third period		No scoring
Masi Marjamaki (2) - 02:11		First overtime period		No scoring
Wade Dubielewicz 34 saves / 36 shots		Goalie stats		Dany Sabourin 20 saves / 23 shots

April 27	Wilkes-Barre/Scranton Penguins	3 – 2	OT	Bridgeport Sound Tigers	Arena at Harbor Yard	Recap
No scoring		First period		No scoring
Noah Welch (1) - 18:50		Second period		No scoring
Jonathan Filewich (4) - 10:04		Third period		03:47 - Masi Marjamaki (3); 11:17 - Matt Koalska (2)
Ryan Stone (2) - pp - 13:39		First overtime period		No scoring
Marc-Andre Fleury 33 saves / 35 shots		Goalie stats		Wade Dubielewicz 45 saves / 48 shots

April 29	Bridgeport Sound Tigers	4 – 5	Wilkes-Barre/Scranton Penguins	Wachovia Arena at Casey Plaza	Recap
Allan Rourke (1) - pp - 10:57		First period	08:58 - Ryan Whitney (1); 17:36 - Erik Christensen (1)
Justin Papineau (1) - 02:06		Second period	01:12 - Daniel Carcillo (1)
Bruno Gervais (1) - 17:09; Rob Collins (4) - 19:15		Third period	04:47 - pp - Ryan Stone (3); 18:52 - en - Jonathan Filewich (5)
Wade Dubielewicz 26 saves / 30 shots		Goalie stats	Marc-Andre Fleury 27 saves / 31 shots

Wilkes-Barre/Scranton won series 4 – 3

===== (E2) Hershey Bears vs. (E3) Norfolk Admirals =====
April 19	Norfolk Admirals	2 – 3	Hershey Bears	GIANT Center	Recap
No scoring		First period	09:10 - pp - Kris Beech (1)
Pavel Vorobyev (1) - 15:36		Second period	11:35 - Tomas Fleischmann (1)
Carl Corazzini (1) - pp - 00:41		Third period	06:11 - Boyd Gordon (1)
Adam Munro 23 saves / 26 shots		Goalie stats	Frederic Cassivi 30 saves / 32 shots

April 21	Hershey Bears	5 – 2	Norfolk Admirals	Norfolk Scope	Recap
Dave Steckel (1) - 18:43		First period	No scoring
Graham Mink (1) - pp - 03:17; Graham Mink (2) - 18:14; Graham Mink (3) - pp - 19:23		Second period	17:16 - pp - Dustin Byfuglien (1)
Tomas Fleischmann (2) - 03:39		Third period	00:26 - Mark Cullen (1)
Frederic Cassivi 31 saves / 33 shots		Goalie stats	Adam Munro 17 saves / 21 shots Corey Crawford 3 saves / 4 shots

April 22	Hershey Bears	5 – 4	2OT	Norfolk Admirals	Norfolk Scope	Recap
No scoring		First period		11:00 - pp - Brandon Bochenski (1)
Kris Beech (2) - pp - 06:13; Dave Steckel (2) - 10:58		Second period		02:10 - pp - James Wisniewski (1)
Boyd Gordon (2) - 15:00; Brooks Laich (1) - 16:58		Third period		17:44 - pp - Nathan Barrett (1); 18:17 - pp - Mark Cullen (2)
Brooks Laich (2) - 01:52		Second overtime period		No scoring
Frederic Cassivi 33 saves / 37 shots		Goalie stats		Adam Munro 42 saves / 47 shots

April 25	Norfolk Admirals	1 – 5	Hershey Bears	GIANT Center	Recap
Carl Corazzini (2) - pp - 19:50		First period	02:42 - Boyd Gordon (3)
No scoring		Second period	08:18 - Graham Mink (4)
No scoring		Third period	14:20 - pp - Eric Fehr (1); 18:33 - sh - en - Dave Steckel (3); 19:36 - sh - en - Kris Beech (3)
Adam Munro 27 saves / 30 shots		Goalie stats	Frederic Cassivi 30 saves / 31 shots

Hershey won series 4 – 0

=== Western Conference ===
==== North Division ====
===== (N1) Grand Rapids Griffins vs. (N4) Toronto Marlies =====
April 21	Toronto Marlies	5 – 6	3OT	Grand Rapids Griffins	Van Andel Arena	Recap
Aleksander Suglobov (1) - 09:37		First period		09:21 - pp - Donald MacLean (1); 09:49 - Valtteri Filppula (1)
Johnny Pohl (1) - 05:30; Ben Ondrus (1) - 10:22; Aleksander Suglobov (2) - pp - 18:13		Second period		No scoring
Jeremy Williams (1) - pp - 14:09		Third period		01:54 - Kent McDonell (1); 10:59 - Darryl Bootland (1); 11:30 - Donald MacLean (2)
No scoring		Third overtime period		02:21 - pp - Jiri Hudler (1)
Jean-Sebastien Aubin 57 saves / 63 shots		Goalie stats		Jimmy Howard 42 saves / 47 shots

April 22	Toronto Marlies	6 – 3	Grand Rapids Griffins	Van Andel Arena	Recap
Ian White (1) - pp - 09:18; Bates Battaglia (1) - sh - 17:14		First period	14:40 - Jiri Hudler (2)
Brad Leeb (1) - pp - 03:11; Brad Leeb (2) - pp - 17:33		Second period	06:28 - pp - Donald MacLean (3)
Brett Engelhardt (1) - 00:17; Aleksander Suglobov (3) - 07:19		Third period	04:46 - Nate DiCasmirro (1)
Jean-Sebastien Aubin 31 saves / 34 shots		Goalie stats	Jimmy Howard 20 saves / 26 shots

April 24	Grand Rapids Griffins	4 – 1^{1}	Toronto Marlies	Recap
Eric Manlow (1) - 10:51; Tomas Kopecky (1) - pp - 11:36		First period	No scoring
Tomas Kopecky (2) - pp - 15:00		Second period	No scoring
Nate DiCasmirro (2) - en - 19:35		Third period	07:33 - pp - Aleksander Suglobov (4)
Jimmy Howard 35 saves / 36 shots		Goalie stats	Jean-Sebastien Aubin 37 saves / 40 shots

April 27	Grand Rapids Griffins	3 – 2^{2}	Toronto Marlies	Recap
Kent McDonell (2) - pp - 11:56; Donald MacLean (4) - 16:15		First period	No scoring
No scoring		Second period	02:08 - Jay Harrison (1)
Darryl Bootland (2) - 18:41		Third period	17:53 - Brad Leeb (3)
Drew MacIntyre 33 saves / 35 shots		Goalie stats	Jean-Sebastien Aubin 20 saves / 23 shots

April 28	Grand Rapids Griffins	2 – 1^{1}	2OT	Toronto Marlies	Recap
No scoring		First period		00:21 - Aleksander Suglobov (5)
No scoring		Second period		No scoring
Matt Ellis (1) - 03:45		Third period		No scoring
Matt Ellis (2) - 00:11		Second overtime period		No scoring
Drew MacIntyre 41 saves / 42 shots		Goalie stats		Jean-Sebastien Aubin 43 saves / 45 shots

Grand Rapids won series 4 – 1

^{1} – Game played at Ricoh Coliseum
^{2} – Game played at Air Canada Centre

===== (N2) Syracuse Crunch vs. (N3) Manitoba Moose =====
April 21	Manitoba Moose	0 – 1	Syracuse Crunch	War Memorial at Oncenter	Recap
No scoring		First period	No scoring
No scoring		Second period	17:52 - sh - Tyler Kolarik (1)
No scoring		Third period	No scoring
Wade Flaherty 34 saves / 35 shots		Goalie stats	Pascal Leclaire 32 saves / 32 shots

April 22	Manitoba Moose	1 – 2	2OT	Syracuse Crunch	War Memorial at Oncenter	Recap
Alex Burrows (1) - 08:15		First period		No scoring
No scoring		Second period		No scoring
No scoring		Third period		03:31 - pp - Mark Hartigan (1)
No scoring		Second overtime period		04:06 - Alexandre Picard (1)
Wade Flaherty 40 saves / 42 shots		Goalie stats		Pascal Leclaire 45 saves / 46 shots

April 24	Syracuse Crunch	1 – 2	Manitoba Moose	MTS Centre	Recap
No scoring		First period	16:56 - pp - Jason Jaffray (1)
No scoring		Second period	14:42 - Josh Green (1)
Dan Fritsche (1) - pp - 19:58		Third period	No scoring
Pascal Leclaire 38 saves / 40 shots		Goalie stats	Wade Flaherty 21 saves / 22 shots

April 26	Syracuse Crunch	2 – 6	Manitoba Moose	MTS Centre	Recap
Geoff Platt (1) - pp - 16:46		First period	10:44 - pp - Jesse Schultz (1)
Aaron Johnson (1) - 06:34		Second period	02:21 - pp - Jason Jaffray (2); 04:12 - pp - Jesse Schultz (2); 18:43 - pp - Josh Green (2); 19:54 - pp - Lee Goren (1)
No scoring		Third period	07:12 - Alex Burrows (2)
Pascal Leclaire 23 saves / 28 shots Andrew Penner 3 saves / 4 shots		Goalie stats	Wade Flaherty 15 saves / 17 shots

April 28	Syracuse Crunch	2 – 3	OT	Manitoba Moose	MTS Centre	Recap
Geoff Platt (2) - sh - 12:30		First period		03:40 - pp - Craig Darby (1)
Joakim Lindstrom (1) - 10:09		Second period		No scoring
No scoring		Third period		13:51 - Alex Burrows (3)
No scoring		First overtime period		05:24 - Lee Goren (2)
Pascal Leclaire 32 saves / 35 shots		Goalie stats		Wade Flaherty 16 saves / 18 shots

April 30	Manitoba Moose	3 – 2	OT	Syracuse Crunch	War Memorial at Oncenter	Recap
Jason Jaffray (3) - 04:13; Jesse Schultz (3) - 07:34		First period		12:55 - pp - Geoff Platt (3)
No scoring		Second period		No scoring
No scoring		Third period		19:41 - Dan Fritsche (2)
Prestin Ryan (1) - 09:40		First overtime period		No scoring
Wade Flaherty 32 saves / 34 shots		Goalie stats		Andrew Penner 33 saves / 36 shots

Manitoba won series 4 – 2

==== West Division ====
===== (W1) Milwaukee Admirals vs. (W4) Iowa Stars =====
April 21	Milwaukee Admirals	3 – 1	Iowa Stars	Bradley Center
5:43 - Rich Peverley (1); 11:23 - pp - Steve Lingren (1)		First period	B.J. Crombeen (1) - 14:09
6:52 - Simon Gamache (1)		Second period	No scoring
No scoring		Third period	No scoring
Brian Finley 22 saves / 23 shots		Goalie stats	Mike Smith 25 saves / 28 shots

April 22	Milwaukee Admirals	3 – 5	Iowa Stars	Bradley Center

April 24	Iowa Stars	2 – 3	Milwaukee Admirals	Wells Fargo Arena

April 25	Iowa Stars	2 – 3	Milwaukee Admirals	Wells Fargo Arena

April 27	Iowa Stars	5 – 1	Milwaukee Admirals	Wells Fargo Arena

April 28	Milwaukee Admirals	2 – 4	Iowa Stars	Bradley Center

April 30	Milwaukee Admirals	4 – 1	Iowa Stars	Bradley Center

Milwaukee won series 4 – 3

===== (W2) Houston Aeros vs. (W3) Peoria Rivermen =====
April 21	Houston Aeros	5 – 4	OT	Peoria Rivermen	Toyota Center

April 22	Houston Aeros	3 – 2	OT	Peoria Rivermen	Toyota Center

April 24	Peoria Rivermen	1 – 6	Houston Aeros	Carver Arena

April 26	Peoria Rivermen	3 – 5	Houston Aeros	Carver Arena

Houston won series 4 – 0

== Division Finals ==
=== Eastern Conference ===
==== Atlantic Division ====
===== (A1) Portland Pirates vs. (A2) Hartford Wolf Pack =====
May 2	Hartford Wolf Pack	2 – 6	Portland Pirates	Hartford Civic Center

May 4	Hartford Wolf Pack	3 – 2	OT	Portland Pirates	Hartford Civic Center

May 6	Portland Pirates	4 – 3	OT	Hartford Wolf Pack	Cumberland County Civic Center

May 7	Portland Pirates	4 – 2	Hartford Wolf Pack	Cumberland County Civic Center

May 11	Portland Pirates	1 – 4	Hartford Wolf Pack	Cumberland County Civic Center

May 14	Portland Pirates	4 – 5	OT	Hartford Wolf Pack	Cumberland County Civic Center

Portland won series 4 – 2

==== East Division ====
===== (E1) Wilkes-Barre/Scranton Penguins vs. (E2) Hershey Bears =====
May 4	Wilkes-Barre/Scranton Penguins	4 – 5	Hershey Bears	Wachovia Arena at Casey Plaza

May 6	Wilkes-Barre/Scranton Penguins	0 – 5	Hershey Bears	Wachovia Arena at Casey Plaza

May 7	Hershey Bears	4 – 1	Wilkes-Barre/Scranton Penguins	GIANT Center

May 9	Hershey Bears	1 – 0	Wilkes-Barre/Scranton Penguins	GIANT Center

Hershey won series 4 – 0

=== Western Conference ===
==== North Division ====
===== (N1) Grand Rapids Griffins vs. (N3) Manitoba Moose =====
May 5	Grand Rapids Griffins	1 – 3	Manitoba Moose	Van Andel Arena

May 6	Grand Rapids Griffins	3 – 2	Manitoba Moose	Van Andel Arena

May 9	Manitoba Moose	4 – 5	OT	Grand Rapids Griffins	MTS Centre

May 11	Manitoba Moose	5 – 1	Grand Rapids Griffins	MTS Centre

May 13	Manitoba Moose	2 – 3	Grand Rapids Griffins	MTS Centre

May 15	Grand Rapids Griffins	1 – 3	Manitoba Moose	Van Andel Arena

May 16	Grand Rapids Griffins	5 – 4	Manitoba Moose	Van Andel Arena

Grand Rapids won series 4 – 3

==== West Division ====
===== (W1) Milwaukee Admirals vs. (W2) Houston Aeros =====
May 4	Milwaukee Admirals	5 – 4	Houston Aeros	Bradley Center
4:06 - pp - Darren Haydar (5)		First period	Josh Olson (2) - 7:46
9:23 - Rich Peverley (2)		Second period	Joel Ward (3) - 9:36; Joel Ward (4) - 14:15
15:23 - Greg Zanon (1); 16:46 - Darren Haydar (6); 19:46 - Jordin Tootoo (2)		Third period	Patrick O'Sullivan (2) - pp - 18:12
Pekka Rinne 26 saves / 30 shots		Goalie stats	Josh Harding 23 saves / 28 shots

May 6	Milwaukee Admirals	7 – 0	Houston Aeros	Bradley Center

May 7	Houston Aeros	4 – 7	Milwaukee Admirals	Toyota Center

May 9	Houston Aeros	2 – 4	Milwaukee Admirals	Toyota Center

Milwaukee won series 4 – 0

== Conference finals ==
=== Eastern Conference ===
==== (A1) Portland Pirates vs. (E2) Hershey Bears ====
May 17	Portland Pirates	0 – 5	Hershey Bears	Cumberland County Civic Center

May 18	Portland Pirates	1 – 2	OT	Hershey Bears	Cumberland County Civic Center

May 20	Hershey Bears	5 – 6	2OT	Portland Pirates	GIANT Center

May 21	Hershey Bears	4 – 0	Portland Pirates	GIANT Center

May 23	Portland Pirates	3 – 2	Hershey Bears	Cumberland County Civic Center

May 24	Portland Pirates	3 – 5	Hershey Bears	Cumberland County Civic Center

May 30	Hershey Bears	5 – 4	OT	Portland Pirates	GIANT Center

Hershey won series 4 – 3

=== Western Conference ===
==== (N1) Grand Rapids Griffins vs. (W1) Milwaukee Admirals ====
May 18	Grand Rapids Griffins	0 – 4	Milwaukee Admirals	Van Andel Arena

May 20	Grand Rapids Griffins	1 – 2	Milwaukee Admirals	Van Andel Arena

May 22	Milwaukee Admirals	3 – 2	Grand Rapids Griffins	Bradley Center

May 24	Milwaukee Admirals	5 – 4	Grand Rapids Griffins	Bradley Center

Milwaukee won series 4 – 0

== Calder Cup Final ==
=== (W1) Milwaukee Admirals vs. (E2) Hershey Bears ===
June 2	Milwaukee Admirals	2 – 1	Hershey Bears	Bradley Center

June 3	Milwaukee Admirals	3 – 6	Hershey Bears	Bradley Center

June 10	Hershey Bears	0 – 2	Milwaukee Admirals	GIANT Center

June 11	Hershey Bears	7 – 2	Milwaukee Admirals	GIANT Center

June 13	Hershey Bears	6 – 4	Milwaukee Admirals	GIANT Center

June 15	Milwaukee Admirals	1 – 5	Hershey Bears	Bradley Center

Hershey won series 4 – 2

== See also ==
- 2005–06 AHL season
- List of AHL seasons

Preceded by 2005 Calder Cup playoffs	Calder Cup playoffs 2006	Succeeded by 2007 Calder Cup playoffs
