= 2008 Calder Cup playoffs =

North American ice hockey tournament

Tournament details
- Dates: April 16 – June 10, 2008
- Teams: 16

Final positions
- Champions: Chicago Wolves
- Runners-up: Wilkes-Barre/Scranton Penguins

The 2008 Calder Cup playoffs of the American Hockey League began on April 16, 2008. The sixteen teams that qualified, eight from each conference, played best-of-7 series for division semifinals, finals and conference finals. The conference champions played a best-of-7 series for the Calder Cup. The Calder Cup Final ended on June 10, 2008 with the Chicago Wolves defeating the Wilkes-Barre/Scranton Penguins, four games to two, to win the second Calder Cup in team history. Jason Krog won the Jack A. Butterfield Trophy as playoff MVP, after having already been named the regular-season MVP. Krog also tied the AHL record for most assists in one playoff with 26.

In Game 5 of the East Division Semifinals between the Philadelphia Phantoms and Albany River Rats, Ryan Potulny of Philadelphia scored 2:58 into the fifth overtime period, ending what was longest game in AHL history. In 2018 a game would last until 6:48 into the fifth overtime period, setting a new record. Chicago's Darren Haydar set two AHL playoff scoring records in Game 2 of the Calder Cup Final by recording his 52nd career AHL playoff goal, as well as his 120th career AHL playoff point. In the same game, Wilkes-Barre/Scranton's Alex Goligoski set an AHL record for most points scored by a defenseman in a single post-season with 26. This eclipsed the record set by former Wilkes-Barre/Scranton defenseman Chris Kelleher, who scored 25 points in the 2001 Calder Cup Playoffs. Goligoski extended his record to 28 points before the playoffs ended.

== Playoff seeds ==
After the 2007–08 AHL regular season, 16 teams qualified for the playoffs. The top four teams from each division qualified for the playoffs, except in the North division where the fourth playoff spot was taken by the fifth-placed team from the West division since the fifth-placed San Antonio Rampage earned more points than the Hamilton Bulldogs during the season. This is because the West division has 8 teams while the other three divisions have 7 teams each. Therefore, this was the only situation in which a crossover was possible. The Providence Bruins were the Eastern Conference regular season champions as well as the Macgregor Kilpatrick Trophy winners with the best overall regular season record. The Chicago Wolves were the Western Conference regular season champions.

=== Eastern Conference ===
==== Atlantic Division ====
1. Providence Bruins – Eastern Conference regular season champions; Macgregor Kilpatrick Trophy winners, 117 points
2. Hartford Wolf Pack – 110 points
3. Portland Pirates – 99 points
4. Manchester Monarchs – 88 points

==== East Division ====
1. Wilkes-Barre/Scranton Penguins – 101 points
2. Philadelphia Phantoms – 99 points
3. Albany River Rats – 93 points
4. Hershey Bears – 92 points

=== Western Conference ===
==== North Division ====
1. Toronto Marlies – 109 points
2. Syracuse Crunch – 100 points
3. Manitoba Moose – 99 points
4. San Antonio Rampage – 94 points (Fifth-place in West Division)

==== West Division ====
1. Chicago Wolves – Western Conference regular season champions, 111 points
2. Rockford IceHogs – 98 points
3. Houston Aeros – 96 points
4. Milwaukee Admirals – 95 points

== Bracket ==
Division Semifinals	Division Finals
A1	Providence	4
A4	Manchester	0
A1	Providence	2
Atlantic Division
A3	Portland	4
A2	Hartford	1
A3	Portland	4
Eastern Conference
E1	Wilkes-Barre/Scranton	4
E4	Hershey	1
E1	Wilkes-Barre/Scranton	4
East Division
E2	Philadelphia	1
E2	Philadelphia	4
E3	Albany	3
N1	Toronto	4
W5	San Antonio	3
N1	Toronto	4
North Division
N2	Syracuse	3
N2	Syracuse	4
N3	Manitoba	2
Western Conference
W1	Chicago	4
W4	Milwaukee	2
W1	Chicago	4
West Division
W2	Rockford	3
W2	Rockford	4
W3	Houston	1

Conference Finals
A3	Portland	3
E1	Wilkes-Barre/Scranton	4
N1	Toronto	1
W1	Chicago	4

Calder Cup Final
E1	Wilkes-Barre/Scranton	2
W1	Chicago	4

In each round the team that earned more points during the regular season receives home ice advantage, meaning they receive the "extra" game on home-ice if the series reaches the maximum number of games. There is no set series format due to arena scheduling conflicts and travel considerations.

== Division Semifinals ==
Note 1: All times are in Eastern Daylight Time (UTC−4).
Note 2: Game times in italics signify games to be played only if necessary.
Note 3: Home team is listed first.

=== Eastern Conference ===
==== Atlantic Division ====
===== (A1) Providence Bruins vs. (A4) Manchester Monarchs =====
April 16	Providence Bruins	3 – 2	OT	Manchester Monarchs	Dunkin' Donuts Center
No scoring		First period		Petr Kanko (1) - 14:47
9:48 - sh - Wacey Rabbit (1)		Second period		No scoring
6:16 - Jeff Hoggan (1)		Third period		Matt Moulson (1) - 9:30
9:01 - Pascal Pelletier (1)		First overtime period		No scoring
Tuukka Rask 25 saves / 27 shots		Goalie stats		Jonathan Bernier 34 saves / 37 shots

April 18	Providence Bruins	2 – 0	Manchester Monarchs	Dunkin' Donuts Center
No scoring		First period	No scoring
No scoring		Second period	No scoring
16:54 - Jordan Knackstedt (1); 19:20 - en - Pascal Pelletier (2)		Third period	No scoring
Tuukka Rask 21 saves / 21 shots		Goalie stats	Jonathan Quick 38 saves / 39 shots

April 19	Manchester Monarchs	2 – 3	OT	Providence Bruins	Verizon Wireless Arena
No scoring		First period		17:07 - T.J. Trevelyan (1)
No scoring		Second period		No scoring
Troy Milam (1) - pp - 10:03; Matt Moulson (2) - pp - 13:41		Third period		9:21 - Wacey Rabbit (2)
No scoring		First overtime period		5:34 - sh - Jeff Hoggan (2)
Jonathan Bernier 31 saves / 34 shots		Goalie stats		Tuukka Rask 33 saves / 35 shots

April 21	Manchester Monarchs	2 – 3	OT	Providence Bruins	Verizon Wireless Arena
No scoring		First period		No scoring
14:18 - David Meckler (1); 19:50 - Brady Murray (1)		Second period		No scoring
No scoring		Third period		Pascal Pelletier (3) - 5:41; Jeff Hoggan (3) - 15:10
No scoring		First overtime period		Martins Karsums (1) - 0:46
Jonathan Bernier 24 saves / 27 shots		Goalie stats		Tuukka Rask 22 saves / 24 shots

Providence wins series 4 – 0

===== (A2) Hartford Wolf Pack vs. (A3) Portland Pirates =====
April 16	Hartford Wolf Pack	3 – 1	Portland Pirates	XL Center

April 17	Hartford Wolf Pack	2 – 3	2OT	Portland Pirates	XL Center

April 19	Portland Pirates	3 – 2	Hartford Wolf Pack	Cumberland County Civic Center

April 20	Portland Pirates	4 – 3	Hartford Wolf Pack	Cumberland County Civic Center

April 22	Hartford Wolf Pack	2 – 3	Portland Pirates	XL Center

Portland wins series 4 – 1

==== East Division ====
===== (E1) Wilkes-Barre/Scranton Penguins vs. (E4) Hershey Bears =====
April 16	Hershey Bears	1 – 2	OT	Wilkes-Barre/Scranton Penguins	GIANT Center
No scoring		First period		No scoring
No scoring		Second period		No scoring
Chris Bourque (1) - 10:02		Third period		0:17 - Connor James (1)
No scoring		First overtime period		4:52 - Chris Minard (1)
Frederic Cassivi 21 saves / 23 shots		Goalie stats		John Curry 26 saves / 27 shots

April 19	Wilkes-Barre/Scranton Penguins	6 – 2	Hershey Bears	Wachovia Arena at Casey Plaza
2:13 - Tim Brent (1); 14:31 - Chris Minard (2)		First period	Andrew Gordon (1) - 13:34
9:27 - Alex Goligoski (1)		Second period	Andrew Gordon (2) - pp - 4:37
5:53 - Dave Gove (1); 7:34 - Tim Brent (2); 8:08 - Ryan Stone (1)		Third period	No scoring
John Curry 26 saves / 28 shots		Goalie stats	Federic Cassivi 21 saves / 27 shots Daren Machesney 2 saves / 2 shots

April 20	Wilkes-Barre/Scranton Penguins	5 – 1	Hershey Bears	Wachovia Arena at Casey Plaza
Alain Nasreddine (1) - pp - 1:54; Mark Ardelan (1) - pp - 7:59; Tim Brent (3) - pp - 9:16		First period	13:06 - pp - Andrew Gordon (3)
Tim Wallace (1) - 1:30		Second period	No scoring
Nathan Smith (1) - 14:29		Third period	No scoring
John Curry 23 saves / 24 shots		Goalie stats	Daren Machesney 9 saves / 12 shots Frederic Cassivi 17 saves / 19 shots

April 23	Hershey Bears	3 – 2	OT	Wilkes-Barre/Scranton Penguins	GIANT Center
No scoring		First period		No scoring
9:00 - pp - Alexandre Giroux (1)		Second period		No scoring
16:59 - pp - Jonathan Paiement (1)		Third period		Chris Minard (3) - pp - 3:42; Chris Minard (4) - 19:41
0:20 - Alexandre Giroux (2)		First overtime period		No scoring
Frederic Cassivi 32 saves / 34 shots		Goalie stats		John Curry 30 saves / 33 shots

April 25	Wilkes-Barre/Scranton Penguins	7 – 3	Hershey Bears	Wachovia Arena at Casey Plaza
15:10 - pp - Tim Brent (4)		First period	Maxime Lacroix (1) - 7:08
10:36 - Luca Caputi (1); 13:47 - pp - Chris Minard (5)		Second period	Alexandre Giroux (3) - 3:47
8:38 - pp - Tim Brent (5); 9:28 - pp - Alex Goligoski (2); 15:17 - Nathan Smith (2); 19:45 - Dennis Bonvie (1)		Third period	Eric Fehr (1) - 0:25
John Curry 30 saves / 33 shots		Goalie stats	Frederic Cassivi 26 saves / 33 shots

Wilkes-Barre/Scranton wins series 4 – 1

===== (E2) Philadelphia Phantoms vs. (E3) Albany River Rats =====
Game five was the longest game in AHL history at the time at 82 minutes, 58 seconds of overtime play. It is now the second longest game in AHL history. Philadelphia's Michael Leighton faced 101 shots and made 98 saves, which remains the AHL record.

April 16	Albany River Rats	4 – 0	Philadelphia Phantoms	Times Union Center
Jakub Patruzalek (1) - 7:20		First period	No scoring
Jerome Samson (1) - pp - 17:06; Bryan Rodney (1) - 18:57		Second period	No scoring
Marc Cavosie (1) - pp - 3:17		Third period	No scoring
Michael Leighton 39 saves / 39 shots		Goalie stats	Scott Munroe 21 saves / 25 shots

April 18	Philadelphia Phantoms	3 – 0	Albany River Rats	Wachovia Center
No scoring		First period	No scoring
13:27 - pp - Jared Ross (1); 19:47 - Peter Zingoni (1)		Second period	No scoring
18:56 - en - Boyd Kane (1)		Third period	No scoring
Scott Munroe 18 saves / 18 shots		Goalie stats	Michael Leighton 37 saves / 39 shots

April 20	Philadelphia Phantoms	1 – 4	Albany River Rats	Wachovia Center
No scoring		First period	4:56 - pp - Bryan Rodney (2); 7:39 - Brett Carson (1); 17:10 - Bryan Rodney (3)
No scoring		Second period	No scoring
Peter Zingoni (2) - pp - 15:53		Third period	18:34 - en - Joe Jensen (1)
Scott Munroe 21 saves / 24 shots		Goalie stats	Michael Leighton 38 saves / 39 shots

April 22	Albany River Rats	1 – 2	Philadelphia Phantoms	Times Union Center
2:20 - pp - Jakub Petruzalek (2)		First period	Jon Matsumoto (1) - 2:20
No scoring		Second period	Kyle Greentree (1) - pp - 5:20
No scoring		Third period	No scoring
Michael Leighton 24 saves / 26 shots		Goalie stats	Scott Munroe 30 saves / 31 shots

April 24	Albany River Rats	2 – 3	5OT	Philadelphia Phantoms	Times Union Center
No scoring		First period		No scoring
Kiel McLeod (1) - 2:57; Kiel McLeod (2) - pp - 17:14		Second period		7:41 - sh - Jared Ross (2)
No scoring		Third period		15:13 - Jared Ross (3)
No scoring		Fifth overtime period		2:58 - Ryan Potulny (1)
Michael Leighton 98 saves / 101 shots		Goalie stats		Scott Munroe 65 saves / 67 shots

April 26	Philadelphia Phantoms	0 – 1	OT	Albany River Rats	Wachovia Center
No scoring		First period		No scoring
No scoring		Second period		No scoring
No scoring		Third period		No scoring
No scoring		First overtime period		10:38 - Kirk MacDonald (1)
Scott Munroe 40 saves / 41 shots		Goalie stats		Michael Leighton 40 saves / 40 shots

April 29	Philadelphia Phantoms	2 – 0	Albany River Rats	Wachovia Center
0:22 - Stefan Ruzicka (1)		First period	No scoring
No scoring		Second period	No scoring
18:33 - Ryan Potulny (2)		Third period	No scoring
Scott Munroe 21 saves / 21 shots		Goalie stats	Michael Leighton 28 saves / 30 shots

Philadelphia wins series 4 – 3

=== Western Conference ===
==== North Division ====
===== (N1) Toronto Marlies vs. (W5) San Antonio Rampage =====
April 16	Toronto Marlies	4 – 3	San Antonio Rampage	Ricoh Coliseum

April 18	Toronto Marlies	3 – 6	San Antonio Rampage	Ricoh Coliseum

April 21	San Antonio Rampage	3 – 2	Toronto Marlies	AT&T Center

April 23	San Antonio Rampage	2 – 3	Toronto Marlies	AT&T Center

April 25	San Antonio Rampage	1 – 2	Toronto Marlies	AT&T Center

April 27	Toronto Marlies	0 – 3	San Antonio Rampage	Ricoh Coliseum

April 28	Toronto Marlies	2 – 1	San Antonio Rampage	Ricoh Coliseum

Toronto wins series 4 – 3

===== (N2) Syracuse Crunch vs. (N3) Manitoba Moose =====
April 18	Syracuse Crunch	2 – 1	OT	Manitoba Moose	War Memorial at Oncenter

April 19	Syracuse Crunch	2 – 3	OT	Manitoba Moose	War Memorial at Oncenter

April 22	Manitoba Moose	1 – 2	OT	Syracuse Crunch	MTS Centre

April 25	Manitoba Moose	5 – 2	Syracuse Crunch	MTS Centre

April 26	Manitoba Moose	2 – 3	OT	Syracuse Crunch	MTS Centre

April 28	Syracuse Crunch	3 – 2	OT	Manitoba Moose	War Memorial at Oncenter

Syracuse wins series 4 – 2

==== West Division ====
===== (W1) Chicago Wolves vs. (W4) Milwaukee Admirals =====
April 16	Chicago Wolves	3 – 4	OT	Milwaukee Admirals	Allstate Arena
No scoring		First period		No scoring
12:07 - Brett Sterling (1); 19:48 - Bryan Little (1)		Second period		Josh Langfeld (1) - pp - 2:14
1:23 - Jesse Schultz (1)		Third period		Josh Langfeld (2) - pp - 5:43; Josh Langfeld (3) - 13:04
No scoring		First overtime period		Cal O'Reilly (1) - 6:07
Ondrej Pavelec 21 saves / 25 shots		Goalie stats		Pekka Rinne 34 saves / 37 shots

April 18	Chicago Wolves	2 – 1	Milwaukee Admirals	Allstate Arena
9:30 - Kevin Doell (1)		First period	No scoring
No scoring		Second period	No scoring
5:54 - Jesse Schultz (2)		Third period	John Laliberte (1) - 5:27
Ondrej Pavelec 26 saves / 27 shots		Goalie stats	Pekka Rinne 36 saves / 38 shots

April 20	Milwaukee Admirals	3 – 4	OT	Chicago Wolves	Bradley Center
12:05 - Kelsey Wilson (1)		First period		Jesse Schultz (3) - 16:24; Darren Haydar (1) - 18:16
No scoring		Second period		No scoring
2:05 - pp - Josh Langfeld (4); 4:03 - sh - Josh Langfeld (5)		Third period		Kevin Doell (2) - sh - 11:24
No scoring		First overtime period		Darren Haydar (2) - pp - 14:08
Pekka Rinne 29 saves / 33 shots		Goalie stats		Ondrej Pavelec 27 saves / 30 shots

April 23	Milwaukee Admirals	2 – 0	Chicago Wolves	Bradley Center
No scoring		First period	No scoring
No scoring		Second period	No scoring
5:45 - Rich Peverley (1); 18:15 - Antti Pihlstrom (1)		Third period	No scoring
Pekka Rinne 37 saves / 37 shots		Goalie stats	Ondrej Pavelec 15 saves / 17 shots

April 24	Chicago Wolves	4 – 1	Milwaukee Admirals	Allstate Arena
1:59 - Brett Sterling (2); 9:17 - Darren Haydar (3)		First period	No scoring
4:45 - Brian Fahey (1); 7:52 - Joe Motzko (1)		Second period	No scoring
No scoring		Third period	Mark Matheson (1) - 19:52
Ondrej Pavelec 26 saves / 27 shots		Goalie stats	Pekka Rinne 19 saves / 23 shots Dov Grumet-Morris 6 saves / 6 shots

April 26	Milwaukee Admirals	0 – 3	Chicago Wolves	Bradley Center
No scoring		First period	Arturs Kulda (1) - 7:19
No scoring		Second period	Boris Valabik (1) - sh - 5:05
No scoring		Third period	Boris Valabik (2) - en - 19:26
Pekka Rinne 24 saves / 26 shots		Goalie stats	Ondrej Pavelec 30 saves / 30 shots

Chicago wins series 4 – 2

===== (W2) Rockford IceHogs vs. (W3) Houston Aeros =====
April 18	Rockford IceHogs	3 – 1	Houston Aeros	Rockford MetroCentre
No scoring		First period	No scoring
1:56 - Gavin Morgan (1)		Second period	Ryan Hamilton (1) - 8:26
8:22 - Troy Brouwer (1); 19:58 - en - Martin St. Pierre (1)		Third period	No scoring
Corey Crawford 18 saves / 19 shots		Goalie stats	Barry Brust 24 saves / 26 shots

April 19	Rockford IceHogs	0 – 1	2OT	Houston Aeros	Rockford MetroCentre
No scoring		First period		No scoring
No scoring		Second period		No scoring
No scoring		Third period		No scoring
No scoring		Second overtime period		Ryan Jones (1) - 6:57
Corey Crawford 37 saves / 38 shots		Goalie stats		Barry Brust 30 saves / 30 shots

April 22	Houston Aeros	1 – 2	Rockford IceHogs	Toyota Center
5:01 - Marco Rosa (1)		First period	Kris Versteeg (1) - 11:06
No scoring		Second period	No scoring
No scoring		Third period	Derek Nesbitt (1) - 17:14
Barry Brust 32 saves / 34 shots		Goalie stats	Corey Crawford 15 saves / 16 shots

April 24	Houston Aeros	1 – 2	Rockford IceHogs	Toyota Center
No scoring		First period	No scoring
No scoring		Second period	No scoring
16:02 - Marco Rosa (2)		Third period	Petri Kontiola (1) - 12:49; Kris Versteeg (2) - 13:32
Nolan Schaefer 33 saves / 35 shots		Goalie stats	Corey Crawford 30 saves / 31 shots

April 25	Houston Aeros	2 – 5	Rockford IceHogs	Toyota Center
No scoring		First period	1:55 - sh - Kris Versteeg (3)
Peter Olvecky (1) - 14:33		Second period	13:22 - Mike Blunden (1)
Morten Madsen (1) - 12:26		Third period	1:13 - Bryan Bickell (1); 6:53 - sh - Jake Dowell (1); 15:35 - en - Derek Nesbitt (2)
Barry Brust 20 saves / 24 shots		Goalie stats	Corey Crawford 28 saves / 30 shots

Rockford wins series 4 – 1

== Division Finals ==
=== Eastern Conference ===
==== Atlantic Division ====
===== (A1) Providence Bruins vs. (A3) Portland Pirates =====
April 26	Providence Bruins	4 – 0	Portland Pirates	Dunkin' Donuts Center

April 27	Providence Bruins	7 – 1	Portland Pirates	Dunkin' Donuts Center

May 2	Portland Pirates	4 – 3	OT	Providence Bruins	Cumberland County Civic Center

May 4	Portland Pirates	3 – 2	OT	Providence Bruins	Cumberland County Civic Center

May 6	Portland Pirates	3 – 2	Providence Bruins	Cumberland County Civic Center

May 9	Providence Bruins	4 – 5	Portland Pirates	Dunkin' Donuts Center

Portland wins series 4 – 2

==== East Division ====
===== (E1) Wilkes-Barre/Scranton Penguins vs. (E2) Philadelphia Phantoms =====
May 1	Wilkes-Barre/Scranton Penguins	2 – 5	Philadelphia Phantoms	Wachovia Arena at Casey Plaza
No scoring		First period	Jon Matsumoto (2) - pp - 14:03
7:23 - Connor James (2)		Second period	Jared Ross (4) - 5:10; Stefan Ruzicka (2) - 5:23; Stefan Ruzicka (3) - pp - 19:47
13:11 - Tim Brent (6)		Third period	Andreas Nodl (1) - en - 19:36
John Curry 19 saves / 23 shots		Goalie stats	Scott Munroe 31 saves / 33 shots

May 3	Wilkes-Barre/Scranton Penguins	5 – 4	OT	Philadelphia Phantoms	Wachovia Arena at Casey Plaza
No scoring		First period		Ryan Potulny (3) - pp - 18:27
8:51 - pp - Chris Minard (6)		Second period		Boyd Kane (2) - pp - 15:22; Boyd Kane (3) - 16:29; Lars Jonsson (1) - 16:39
3:36 - Tim Brent (7); 13:25 - Luca Caputi (2); 19:14 - Kurtis McLean (1)		Third period		No scoring
2:07 - Chris Minard (7)		First overtime period		No scoring
John Curry 26 saves / 30 shots		Goalie stats		Scott Munroe 28 saves / 33 shots

May 5	Philadelphia Phantoms	2 – 3	Wilkes-Barre/Scranton Penguins	Wachovia Center
No scoring		First period	Alain Nasreddine (2) - 10:16; Connor James (3) - 10:28; Alex Goligoski (3) - 17:06
No scoring		Second period	No scoring
7:58 - pp - Stefan Ruzicka (4); 8:30 - Jon Kalinski (1)		Third period	No scoring
Scott Munroe 24 saves / 27 shots		Goalie stats	John Curry 22 saves / 24 shots

May 7	Philadelphia Phantoms	4 – 8	Wilkes-Barre/Scranton Penguins	Wachovia Center
17:44 - Darroll Powe (1)		First period	Tim Brent (8) - pp - 5:00; Mark Ardelan (2) - 15:22
0:19 - pp - Jared Ross (5); 7:41 - Boyd Kane (4)		Second period	Ryan Stone (2) - 0:27; Dustin Jeffrey (1) - 4:05; Tim Brent (9) - pp - 12:30; Connor James (4) - 14:50; Nathan Smith (3) - pp - 18:45
14:41 - Peter Zingoni (3)		Third period	Ryan Stone (3) - 13:04
Scott Munroe 17 saves / 22 shots Michael-Lee Teslak 7 saves / 10 shots		Goalie stats	John Curry 32 saves / 36 shots

May 9	Wilkes-Barre/Scranton Penguins	3 – 1	Philadelphia Phantoms	Wachovia Arena at Casey Plaza
19:14 - Dustin Jeffrey (2)		First period	No scoring
12:20 - Chris Minard (8)		Second period	Darren Reid (1) - 7:00
4:01 - Tim Wallace (2)		Third period	No scoring
John Curry 22 saves / 23 shots		Goalie stats	Scott Munroe 20 saves / 23 shots

Wilkes-Barre/Scranton wins series 4 – 1

=== Western Conference ===
==== North Division ====
===== (N1) Toronto Marlies vs. (N2) Syracuse Crunch =====
May 2	Toronto Marlies	1 – 5	Syracuse Crunch	Ricoh Coliseum

May 4	Toronto Marlies	1 – 3	Syracuse Crunch	Ricoh Coliseum

May 6	Syracuse Crunch	2 – 8	Toronto Marlies	War Memorial at Oncenter

May 7	Syracuse Crunch	5 – 4	OT	Toronto Marlies	War Memorial at Oncenter

May 9	Toronto Marlies	4 – 3	OT	Syracuse Crunch	Ricoh Coliseum

May 10	Syracuse Crunch	2 – 3	Toronto Marlies	War Memorial at Oncenter

May 12	Toronto Marlies	3 – 2	Syracuse Crunch	Ricoh Coliseum

Toronto wins series 4 – 3

==== West Division ====
===== (W1) Chicago Wolves vs. (W2) Rockford IceHogs =====
May 1	Chicago Wolves	4 – 1	Rockford IceHogs	Allstate Arena
15:03 - pp - Joel Kwiatkowski (1)		First period	No scoring
14:00 - Darren Haydar (4)		Second period	No scoring
10:12 - pp - Brett Sterling (3); 18:56 - en - Joel Kwiatkowski (2)		Third period	Jack Skille (1) - 15:55
Ondrej Pavelec 29 saves / 30 shots		Goalie stats	Corey Crawford 29 saves / 32 shots

May 3	Chicago Wolves	7 – 3	Rockford IceHogs	Allstate Arena
5:39 - Joe Motzko (2); 7:17 - Darren Haydar (5); 18:05 - Steve Martins (1)		First period	No scoring
No scoring		Second period	Jim Fahey (1) - 11:43
1:15 - sh - Colin Stuart (1); 9:19 - Bryan Little (2); 12:24 - Boris Valabik (3); 15:53 - pp - Darren Haydar (6)		Third period	Petri Kontiola (2) - pp - 1:39; Bryan Bickell (2) - 5:03
Ondrej Pavelec 42 saves / 45 shots		Goalie stats	Corey Crawford 31 saves / 38 shots

May 4	Rockford IceHogs	3 – 1	Chicago Wolves	Rockford MetroCentre
No scoring		First period	No scoring
8:24 - Kris Versteeg (4); 15:47 - pp - Derek Nesbitt (3)		Second period	No scoring
3:08 - pp - Petri Kontiola (3)		Third period	Bryan Little (3) - pp - 18:44
Corey Crawford 27 saves / 28 shots		Goalie stats	Ondrej Pavelec 40 saves / 43 shots

May 7	Rockford IceHogs	3 – 2	Chicago Wolves	Rockford MetroCentre

May 9	Chicago Wolves	1 – 5	Rockford IceHogs	Allstate Arena

May 11	Rockford IceHogs	3 – 4	Chicago Wolves	Rockford MetroCentre

May 13	Chicago Wolves	4 – 1	Rockford IceHogs	Allstate Arena

Chicago wins series 4 – 3

== Conference finals ==
=== Eastern Conference ===
==== (E1) Wilkes-Barre/Scranton Penguins vs. (A3) Portland Pirates ====
May 14	Wilkes-Barre/Scranton Penguins	2 – 0	Portland Pirates	Wachovia Arena at Casey Plaza

May 15	Wilkes-Barre/Scranton Penguins	2 – 3	Portland Pirates	Wachovia Arena at Casey Plaza

May 18	Portland Pirates	5 – 2	Wilkes-Barre/Scranton Penguins	Cumberland County Civic Center

May 20	Portland Pirates	3 – 4	Wilkes-Barre/Scranton Penguins	Cumberland County Civic Center

May 21	Portland Pirates	2 – 1	Wilkes-Barre/Scranton Penguins	Cumberland County Civic Center

May 23	Wilkes-Barre/Scranton Penguins	4 – 3	OT	Portland Pirates	Wachovia Arena at Casey Plaza

May 24	Wilkes-Barre/Scranton Penguins	3 – 2	Portland Pirates	Wachovia Arena at Casey Plaza

Wilkes-Barre/Scranton wins series 4-3

=== Western Conference ===
==== (W1) Chicago Wolves vs. (N1) Toronto Marlies ====
May 16	Chicago Wolves	4 – 1	Toronto Marlies	Allstate Arena

May 18	Chicago Wolves	5 – 0	Toronto Marlies	Allstate Arena

May 20	Toronto Marlies	1 – 4	Chicago Wolves	Ricoh Coliseum

May 21	Toronto Marlies	6 – 1	Chicago Wolves	Ricoh Coliseum

May 23	Chicago Wolves	4 – 2	Toronto Marlies	Allstate Arena

Chicago wins series 4 – 1

== Calder Cup Final ==
=== (W1) Chicago Wolves vs. (E1) Wilkes-Barre/Scranton Penguins ===
May 29	Chicago Wolves	5 – 4	Wilkes-Barre/Scranton Penguins	Allstate Arena

June 1	Chicago Wolves	4 – 2	Wilkes-Barre/Scranton Penguins	Allstate Arena

June 4	Wilkes-Barre/Scranton Penguins	1 – 6	Chicago Wolves	Wachovia Arena at Casey Plaza

June 6	Wilkes-Barre/Scranton Penguins	3 – 2	Chicago Wolves	Wachovia Arena at Casey Plaza

June 7	Wilkes-Barre/Scranton Penguins	5 – 1	Chicago Wolves	Wachovia Arena at Casey Plaza

June 10	Chicago Wolves	5 – 2	Wilkes-Barre/Scranton Penguins	Allstate Arena

Chicago wins series 4 – 2

== See also ==
- 2007–08 AHL season
- List of AHL seasons

Preceded by 2007 Calder Cup playoffs	Calder Cup playoffs 2008	Succeeded by 2009 Calder Cup playoffs
