= Michel Ouellet =

Canadian ice hockey player (born 1982)

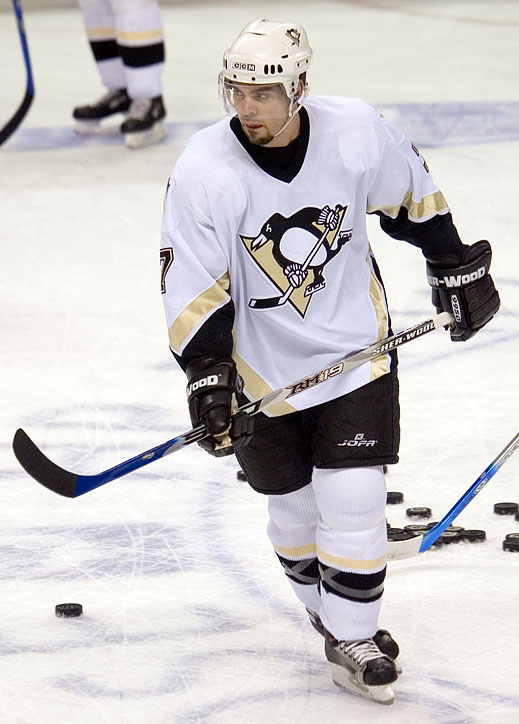
- Ouellet with the Pittsburgh Penguins in 2006
- Born: March 5, 1982 (age 44) Rimouski, Quebec, Canada
- Height: 6 ft 0 in (183 cm)
- Weight: 194 lb (88 kg; 13 st 12 lb)
- Position: Right wing
- Shot: Right
- Played for: Pittsburgh Penguins; Tampa Bay Lightning; Vancouver Canucks; Fribourg-Gottéron; Hamburg Freezers
- NHL draft: 124th overall, 2000; Pittsburgh Penguins
- Playing career: 2002–2014

Michel Ouellet (born March 5, 1982) is a Canadian former professional ice hockey player. He played as a right winger in the National Hockey League (NHL). Ouellet was selected by the Pittsburgh Penguins in the fourth round, 124th overall, of the 2000 NHL entry draft.

He was drafted out of the Quebec Major Junior Hockey League (QMJHL) by the Pittsburgh Penguins of the National Hockey League (NHL) in 2000. He was named to the American Hockey League (AHL) All-Rookie Team with the Penguins' minor league affiliate, the Wilkes-Barre/Scranton Penguins in 2004. He has also played in the NHL with the Tampa Bay Lightning and Vancouver Canucks.

== Playing career ==
As a youth, Ouellet played in the 1996 Quebec International Pee-Wee Hockey Tournament with the Rimouski Océanic minor ice hockey team. He later played for Rimouski Océanic in the QMJHL before being drafted 124th overall by the Pittsburgh Penguins in the 2000 NHL entry draft. He spent his first few years out of junior in the minor leagues and was named to the American Hockey League (AHL) All-Rookie Team with the Wilkes-Barre/Scranton Penguins in 2004.

He made his NHL début during the 2005–06 season, playing his first game on November 22, 2005 in a 5–4 victory against the Washington Capitals. Several games later, he scored his first NHL goal and assist in back-to-back games against the Buffalo Sabres on December 16 and 17. He finished his first NHL season with 16 goals and 16 assists in 50 games.

After a career-high 19 goals, 29 assists and 48 points, in 2006–07, he was not tendered a qualifying offer by the Penguins and Ouellet subsequently signed with the Tampa Bay Lightning. On December 14, 2007, he separated his left shoulder after a check from Calgary Flames defenceman Robyn Regehr and missed 18 games. He finished the season with 36 points in 64 games.

On September 29, 2008, Ouellet was placed on waivers due to a salary cutting effort by the Lightning. He cleared waivers and on October 6, he was traded along with Shane O'Brien to the Vancouver Canucks for Lukáš Krajíček and Juraj Šimek. He was immediately assigned to the Manitoba Moose of the AHL, but was recalled by the Canucks on November 3. He was returned to the Moose on November 10, 2008, where he completed the season with 40 points in 46 games.

Ouellet became an unrestricted free agent in the 2009 off-season, but went unsigned by an NHL club. He went overseas to Switzerland to play for Fribourg-Gottéron of the National League A. On December 21, 2009, Ouellet was named to Team Canada for the 2009 Spengler Cup. Canada finished in third place. After a half year Ouellet left Switzerland and signed with German club Hamburg Freezers of the Deutsche Eishockey Liga.

On July 1, 2011, Ouellet rejoined the Tampa Bay Lightning organization when they signed him as a free agent to a one-year, two-way contract. During the 2011–12 season, Ouellet failed to add to his NHL experience, however was assigned to the record achieving affiliate, the Norfolk Admirals contributing to their Calder Cup success. Prior to free agency on June 23, 2012, Ouellet was traded by the Lightning to the Boston Bruins, along with a fifth-round draft pick, for Benoit Pouliot.

Released as a free agent by the Bruins, Ouellet accepted a try-out to the Hamilton Bulldogs training camp for the 2012–13 season on September 26, 2012. He was subsequently released upon completion of camp, due to the high number of players already under contract in the Bulldogs' camp.

After several months of free agency, Ouellet was offered a one-year contract with the Thetford Mines Isothermic of the Ligue Nord-Américaine de Hockey (LNAH) on December 21, 2012. He finished out his playing career after two seasons in the LNAH.

== Career statistics ==
=== Regular season and playoffs ===
			Regular season					Playoffs
Season	Team	League	GP	G	A	Pts	PIM	GP	G	A	Pts	PIM
1998–99	Jonquière Élites	QMAAA	33	20	32	52	52	—	—	—	—	—
1998–99	Rimouski Océanic	QMJHL	28	7	13	20	10	11	0	1	1	6
1999–2000	Rimouski Océanic	QMJHL	72	36	53	89	38	14	4	5	9	14
2000–01	Rimouski Océanic	QMJHL	63	42	50	92	50	11	6	7	13	8
2001–02	Rimouski Océanic	QMJHL	61	40	58	98	66	7	3	6	9	4
2002–03	Wheeling Nailers	ECHL	55	20	26	46	40	—	—	—	—	—
2002–03	Wilkes–Barre/Scranton Penguins	AHL	4	0	2	2	0	—	—	—	—	—
2003–04	Wilkes–Barre/Scranton Penguins	AHL	79	30	19	49	34	22	2	10	12	0
2004–05	Wilkes–Barre/Scranton Penguins	AHL	80	31	32	63	56	11	2	3	5	6
2005–06	Wilkes–Barre/Scranton Penguins	AHL	19	10	20	30	12	—	—	—	—	—
2005–06	Pittsburgh Penguins	NHL	50	16	16	32	16	—	—	—	—	—
2006–07	Pittsburgh Penguins	NHL	73	19	29	48	30	5	0	2	2	6
2007–08	Tampa Bay Lightning	NHL	64	17	19	36	12	—	—	—	—	—
2008–09	Manitoba Moose	AHL	46	13	27	40	30	—	—	—	—	—
2008–09	Vancouver Canucks	NHL	3	0	0	0	0	—	—	—	—	—
2009–10	Fribourg-Gottéron	NLA	11	1	4	5	4	5	1	1	2	4
2010–11	Hamburg Freezers	DEL	39	11	17	28	24	—	—	—	—	—
2011–12	Norfolk Admirals	AHL	55	16	15	31	41	14	1	3	4	6
2012–13	Thetford Mines Isothermic	LNAH	24	19	22	41	2	5	3	2	5	0
2013–14	Thetford Mines Isothermic	LNAH	37	18	39	57	8	17	9	15	24	16
AHL totals			283	100	115	215	173	47	5	16	21	12
NHL totals			190	52	64	116	58	5	0	2	2	6

=== International ===
Year	Team	Event	Result	GP	G	A	Pts	PIM
2010	Team Canada	SC	2nd place, silver medalist(s)	2	0	0	0	0
Senior totals				2	0	0	0	0

== Awards and honours ==
Award	Year	Ref
CHL
President's Cup champion	2000	
Memorial Cup champion	2000	
AHL
All-Rookie Team	2004	
All-Star Game	2005	
Calder Cup champion	2012	
LNAH
Most Gentlemanly Player	2013	
