= Shane O'Brien (ice hockey) =

Canadian ice hockey player (born 1983)

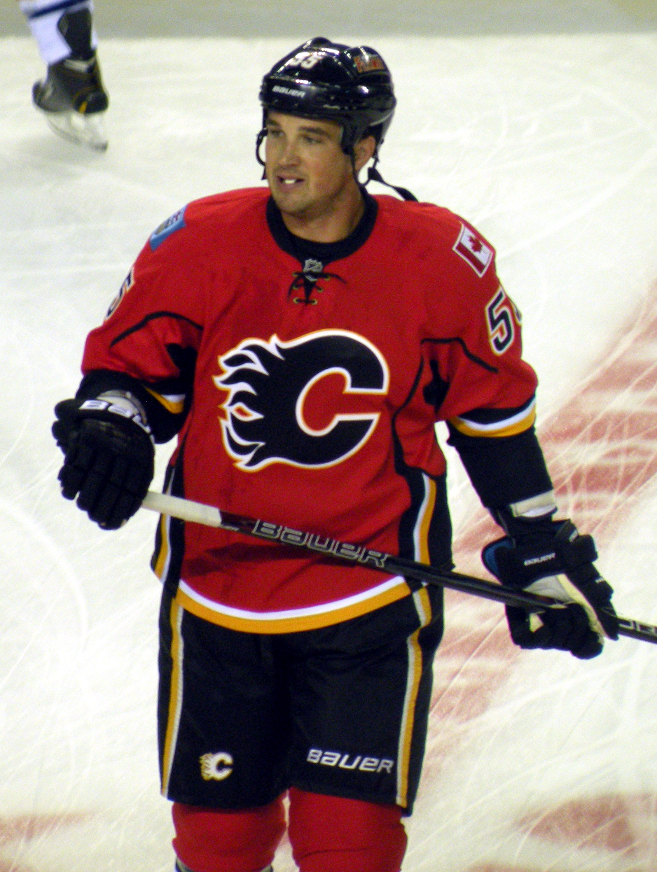
- O'Brien with the Calgary Flames
- Born: August 9, 1983 (age 43) Port Hope, Ontario, Canada
- Height: 6 ft 3 in (191 cm)
- Weight: 230 lb (104 kg; 16 st 6 lb)
- Position: Defence
- Shot: Left
- Played for: Anaheim Ducks; Tampa Bay Lightning; Vancouver Canucks; Nashville Predators; Colorado Avalanche; Calgary Flames; Florida Panthers; HPK; EHC Black Wings Linz
- NHL draft: 250th overall, 2003; Anaheim Ducks
- Playing career: 2003–2018

Shane O'Brien (born August 9, 1983) is a Canadian former professional ice hockey defenceman. His National Hockey League (NHL) career lasted nine years.

== Playing career ==
=== Anaheim Ducks and Tampa Bay Lightning ===
Playing major junior in the Ontario Hockey League (OHL), O'Brien was drafted by the Mighty Ducks of Anaheim in the 8th round, 250th overall, in the 2003 NHL entry draft. Before earning a full-time roster spot with Anaheim, he played with their minor league affiliates, the Cincinnati Mighty Ducks and Portland Pirates of the American Hockey League (AHL). O'Brien led all AHL defenceman in scoring during the 2006 Calder Cup playoffs with six goals and 22 points in 19 post-season games. The Pirates had made it to the semi-finals where they were defeated in seven games by the Hershey Bears. In the off-season, he was re-signed by the Ducks to a one-year contract on August 3, 2006.

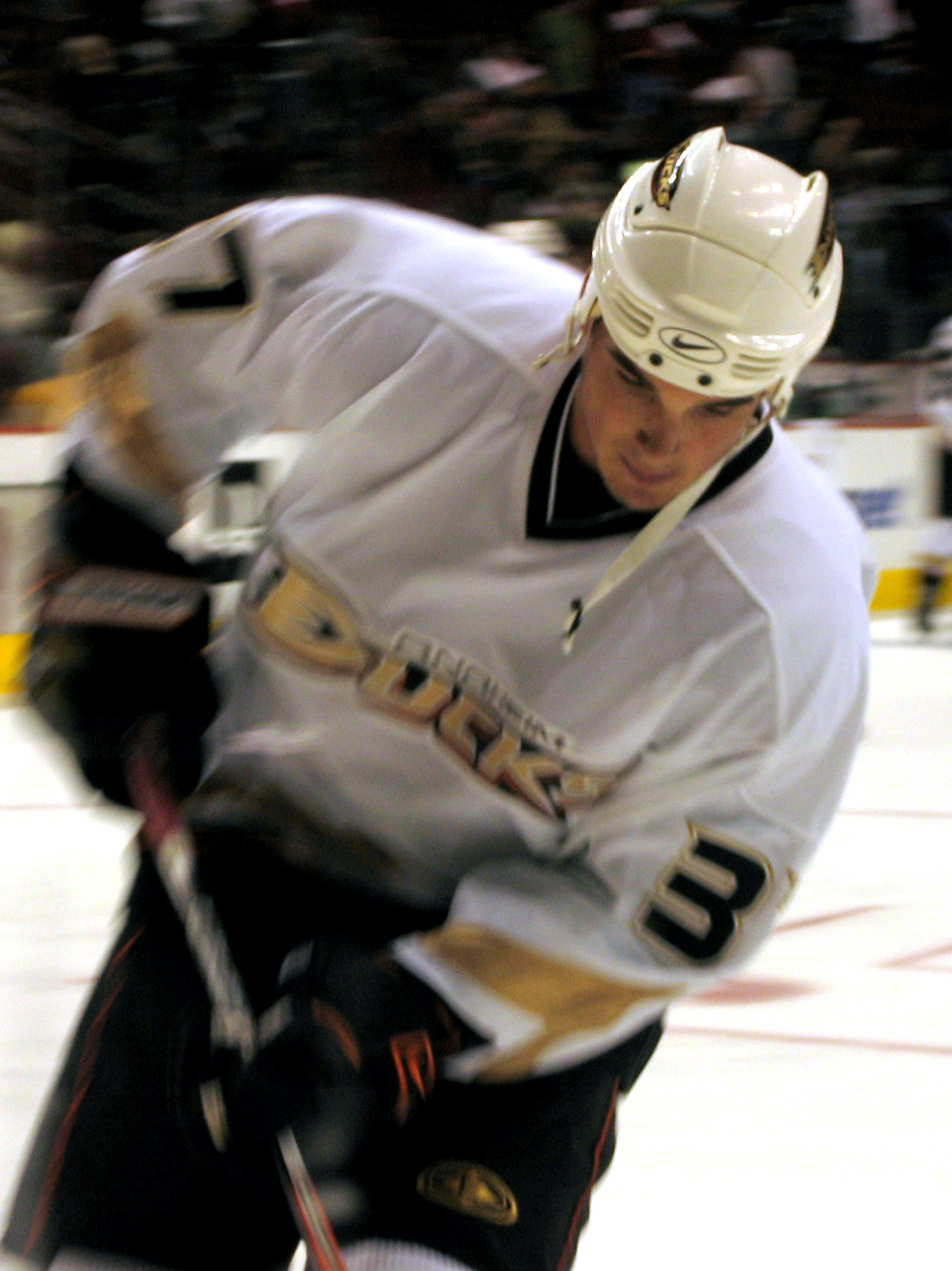
O'Brien warming up while a member of the Anaheim Ducks during the 2006-07 NHL season

O'Brien made his NHL debut against the Los Angeles Kings on October 6, 2006. He scored his first NHL goal later that month against Dominik Hašek in a 4–1 win over the Detroit Red Wings on October 18. He completed the night with a Gordie Howe hat trick by getting an assist and a fight against Brad Norton. On November 8, he scored a goal and two assists against the Vancouver Canucks for a three-point night.

At the trade deadline on February 24, 2007, O'Brien was dealt with a third-round draft pick in 2007 to the Tampa Bay Lightning for goaltender Gerald Coleman and a first-round draft pick in 2007. He had established himself as a fighter during his rookie season. At the time of his trade, he was ranked fifth in the league in fights with 12. Making the transition to Tampa Bay, however, his role as an enforcer was diminished as the club was less prone to fight than the Ducks had been. He made his NHL playoff debut with the Lightning on April 12, meeting the New Jersey Devils in the first round.

After finishing his rookie season with a combined total of two goals and 16 points in the regular season between Anaheim and Tampa Bay, he was re-signed by the Lightning in the off-season. At $2 million over two years, the contract saw O'Brien make $875,000 the first year and $1.125 million in 2008–09 – a raise from his $495,000 salary of the previous season. He would improve to four goals and 21 points in the subsequent season.

=== Vancouver Canucks ===
On October 6, 2008, O'Brien was traded with forward Michel Ouellet to the Vancouver Canucks for defenceman Lukáš Krajíček and prospect Juraj Šimek. During his first year in Vancouver, O'Brien received a minor fine of $2,500 on January 29, 2009, after taking part in a post-game altercation with Ryane Clowe and Joe Pavelski of the San Jose Sharks nine days earlier on January 20. Pavelski allegedly speared Canucks forward Daniel Sedin at the end of the game, a 2–1 overtime loss, leading O'Brien and teammate Willie Mitchell to intervene.

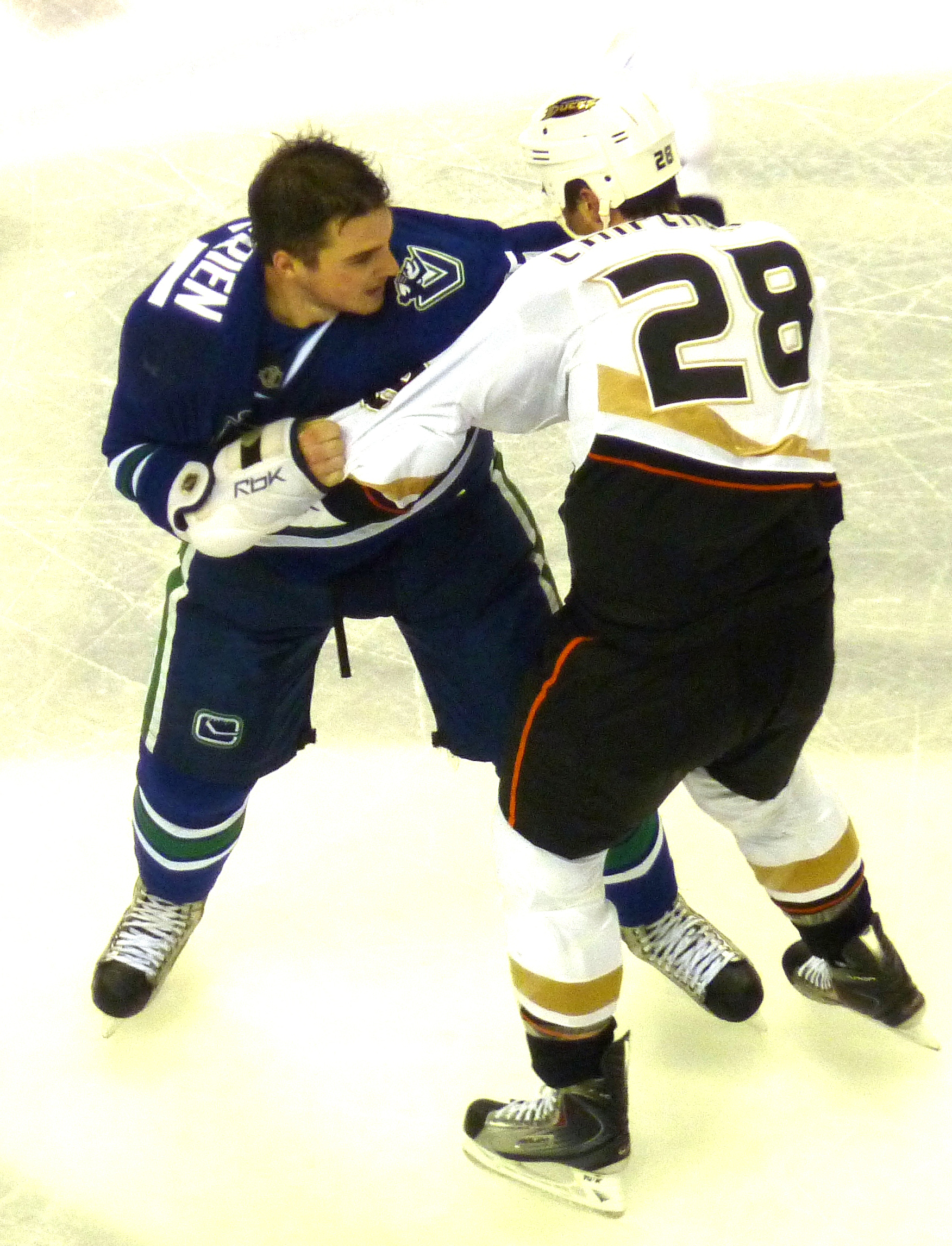
O'Brien fighting Kyle Chipchura of the Anaheim Ducks in December 2009

Soon thereafter, O'Brien garnered significant media attention when, after being unexpectedly made a healthy scratch, he claimed that general manager Mike Gillis implied in a one-on-one meeting that he is only interested in him fighting. O'Brien went on to speculate to the media whether Vancouver was the right fit for him. After another meeting with Gillis the next day, O'Brien apologized through the media for what he described as "selfish" comments borne of frustration, and that he misunderstood Gillis in their initial meeting.

In the subsequent 2009 playoffs, O'Brien scored his first goal as a Canuck against the Chicago Blackhawks in game six of the second round. The goal tied the score at 3–3 in the second period, although Chicago went on to eliminate the Canucks 7–5.

Becoming a restricted free agent in the off-season, O'Brien re-signed with the Canucks to a one-year, $1.6 million contract after turning down the arbitration process. Following an altercation with the New York Rangers on November 3, 2009, O'Brien was suspended for one game by the NHL for poking Rangers forward Sean Avery from across the two teams' benches with his stick. On December 20, 2009, O'Brien scored his first goal in 102 regular-season games in a 3–1 loss to the St. Louis Blues.

Later in the season, on March 30, 2010, head coach Alain Vigneault announced that O'Brien would sit out the next three games for disciplinary reasons. According to the Team 1040, a local sports radio station, O'Brien showed up late for the previous Monday's practice. Besides the incident, however, Vigneault added there was more to the situation than O'Brien being late. O'Brien was not permitted to skate with the team until April 4. He finished his second season in Vancouver with two goals and eight points over 65 games. In the 2010 playoffs, he added a goal and two assists in 12 games as the Canucks were eliminated by the Blackhawks in the second round. Following the Canucks' playoff elimination, he discussed his upcoming restricted free agency and commented on a desire to have more leeway with the coaches. On October 2, 2010, the Vancouver Canucks placed O'Brien on waivers.

=== Nashville Predators and Colorado Avalanche ===
Three days after being placed on waivers, O'Brien was traded to the Nashville Predators, along with Dan Gendur, for Ryan Parent and Jonas Andersson. While in Nashville he tied a career high in games played (80) adding two goals and seven assists during the 2010–11 season. He played in all of the Predators 12 playoff games but went unsigned by Nashville following the playoffs and became a free agent.

On July 13, 2011, he was signed to a one-year contract with the Colorado Avalanche. Acquired initially to provide depth insurance to the defense, O'Brien impressed out of training camp and made his Avalanche debut on the opening night of the 2011–12 season in a 3–0 defeat to the Detroit Red Wings. With his experience, physicality and leadership he quickly became a fixture on the defense of a youthful Avalanche team and appeared in his 400th career game in a 4–1 loss to the San Jose Sharks on November 20. With a more prominent role entrusted than given with former clubs, O'Brien matched a career high with 17 assists and finished with 20 points for his best statistical season since 2008. He also finished second amongst the Avalanche with 105 penalty minutes.

With the option of impending free agency again looming, O'Brien was re-signed by Colorado for $6 million over three years on June 26, 2012. Affected by the lockout-shortened 2012–13 season, O'Brien was unable to emulate his previous year as he was relegated primarily as a depth defenseman to register only 4 assists in 28 games.

=== Calgary Flames and Florida Panthers ===
On June 27, 2013, O'Brien was traded by the Avalanche along with David Jones to the Calgary Flames in exchange for Alex Tanguay and Cory Sarich. On January 25, 2014, O'Brien was placed on waivers by the Flames. Unclaimed, O'Brien was assigned to affiliate, the Abbotsford Heat, marking a return to the AHL for the first time since 2006. On June 30, 2014, O'Brien was placed on unconditional waivers for purposes of a compliance buyout.

As a free agent O'Brien failed to attract significant interest and, on September 2, 2014, he accepted a professional try-out contract to the Florida Panthers training camp. On October 6, 2014, O'Brien was successful in earning a one-year, two-way contract with the Panthers.

=== Return to Anaheim and overseas ===
On July 16, 2015, O'Brien signed as a free agent to a one-year, two-way contract in a return his original NHL club, the Anaheim Ducks. Unable to make the Ducks roster out of training camp, O'Brien added a veteran presence to AHL affiliate, the San Diego Gulls, for the duration of the 2015–16 season, posting 1 goal and 17 points in 57 games.

With his NHL opportunities exhausted, O'Brien remained a free agent over the summer and into the 2016–17 season. On January 10, 2017, O'Brien opted to sign his first contract abroad, agreeing to an initial two-week contract that would extend for the remainder of the season with Finnish club, HPK of the Liiga.

Midway into the following 2017–18 season, O'Brien was signed to strengthen the blueline of Austrian club, EHC Black Wings Linz of the EBEL, on November 9, 2017.

== Personal life ==
O'Brien was born in Port Hope, Ontario, and comes from a lineage of hockey players. His father, Pat O'Brien, played junior in Canada, while his uncle, Dennis O'Brien, had a 10-year career in the NHL, mostly with the Minnesota North Stars.

== Career statistics ==
			Regular season					Playoffs
Season	Team	League	GP	G	A	Pts	PIM	GP	G	A	Pts	PIM
1999–2000	Port Hope Buzzards	OPJHL	47	6	27	33	110	—	—	—	—	—
2000–01	Kingston Frontenacs	OHL	61	2	12	14	89	4	0	1	1	6
2001–02	Kingston Frontenacs	OHL	67	10	23	33	132	1	0	0	0	2
2002–03	Kingston Frontenacs	OHL	28	8	15	23	90	—	—	—	—	—
2002–03	Toronto St. Michael's Majors	OHL	34	8	11	19	108	19	4	10	14	79
2003–04	Cincinnati Mighty Ducks	AHL	60	2	8	10	163	9	0	2	2	30
2004–05	Cincinnati Mighty Ducks	AHL	77	5	20	25	319	12	1	3	4	57
2005–06	Portland Pirates	AHL	77	8	33	41	287	19	6	16	22	81
2006–07	Anaheim Ducks	NHL	62	2	12	14	140	—	—	—	—	—
2006–07	Tampa Bay Lightning	NHL	18	0	2	2	36	6	0	0	0	12
2007–08	Tampa Bay Lightning	NHL	77	4	17	21	154	—	—	—	—	—
2008–09	Tampa Bay Lightning	NHL	1	0	0	0	0	—	—	—	—	—
2008–09	Vancouver Canucks	NHL	76	0	10	10	196	10	1	1	2	24
2009–10	Vancouver Canucks	NHL	65	2	6	8	79	12	1	2	3	25
2010–11	Nashville Predators	NHL	80	2	7	9	83	12	0	0	0	18
2011–12	Colorado Avalanche	NHL	76	3	17	20	105	—	—	—	—	—
2012–13	Colorado Avalanche	NHL	28	0	4	4	60	—	—	—	—	—
2013–14	Calgary Flames	NHL	45	0	3	3	58	—	—	—	—	—
2013–14	Abbotsford Heat	AHL	31	3	5	8	58	4	1	0	1	18
2014–15	San Antonio Rampage	AHL	51	11	19	30	127	2	0	1	1	17
2014–15	Florida Panthers	NHL	9	0	1	1	5	—	—	—	—	—
2015–16	San Diego Gulls	AHL	57	1	16	17	81	—	—	—	—	—
2016–17	HPK	Liiga	18	1	3	4	14	7	0	1	1	4
2017–18	EHC Black Wings Linz	EBEL	34	0	8	8	44	12	2	4	6	16
AHL totals			353	30	101	131	1035	46	8	22	30	205
NHL totals			537	13	79	92	916	40	2	3	5	79

== Transactions ==
- June 21, 2003 - Drafted 250th overall by the Mighty Ducks of Anaheim in the 2003 NHL entry draft.
- February 24, 2007 - Traded from the Mighty Ducks of Anaheim to the Tampa Bay Lightning with a 3rd round draft pick in 2007 for Gerald Coleman and a 1st round draft pick in 2007.
- October 6, 2008 - Traded from the Tampa Bay Lightning to the Vancouver Canucks with Michel Ouellet for Lukáš Krajíček and Juraj Šimek.
- October 5, 2010 - Traded from the Vancouver Canucks to the Nashville Predators with Dan Gendur for Ryan Parent and Jonas Andersson.
- June 27, 2013 - Traded from the Colorado Avalanche to the Calgary Flames with David Jones for Alex Tanguay and Cory Sarich.
