= Martin Sonnenberg =

Canadian ice hockey player

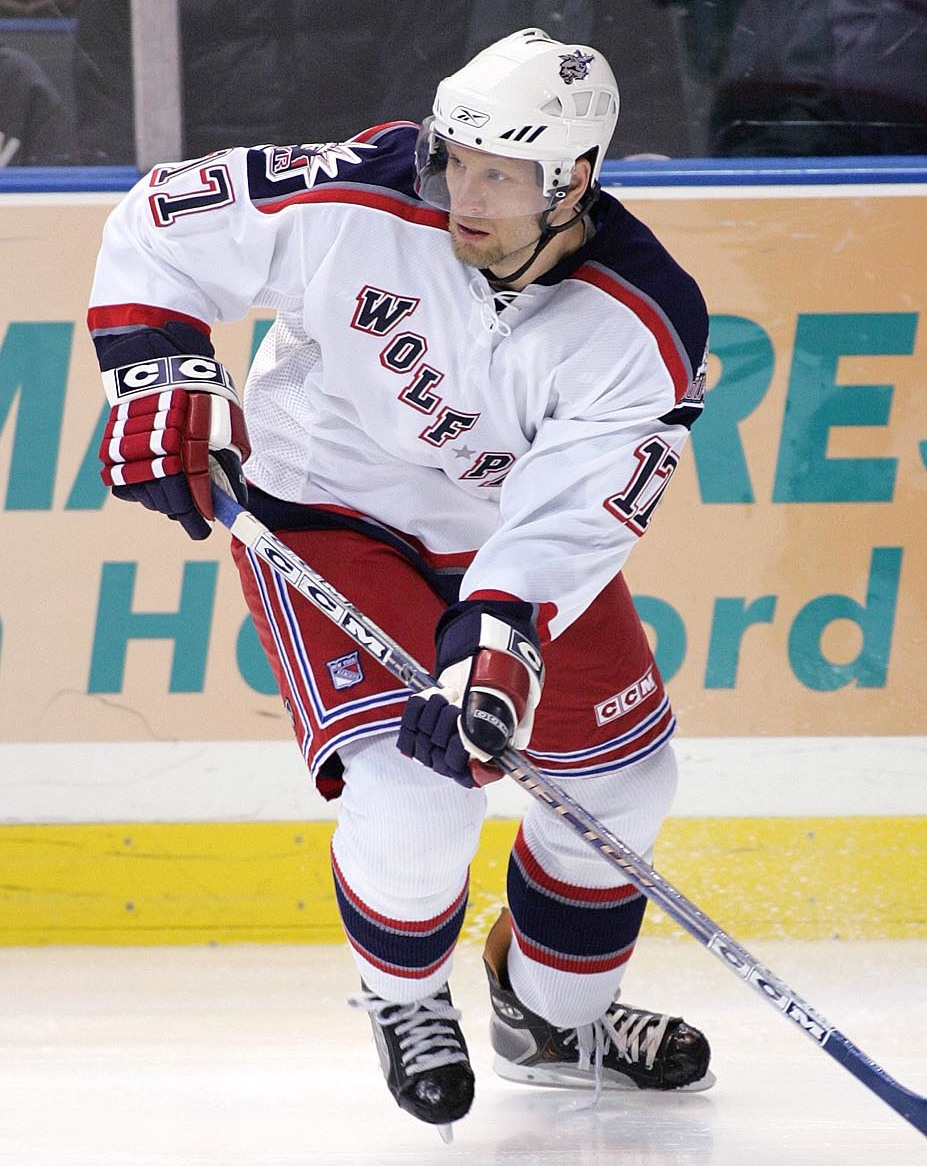
- Sonnenberg with the Hartford Wolf Pack in 2006
- Born: January 23, 1978 (age 47); Wetaskiwin, Alberta, Canada
- Height: 6 ft 0 in (183 cm)
- Weight: 185 lb (84 kg; 13 st 3 lb)
- Position: Left wing
- Shot: Left
- Played for: Pittsburgh Penguins; Calgary Flames; KalPa; HC Ambrì-Piotta; Timrå IK
- NHL draft: Undrafted
- Playing career: 1998–2010

Martin Sonnenberg (born January 23, 1978) is a Canadian former professional ice hockey forward who played three seasons in the National Hockey League (NHL) for the Pittsburgh Penguins and Calgary Flames Now playing in Wetaskiwin for the Wetaskiwin Longhorns

== Playing career ==
Sonnenberg was born in Wetaskiwin, Alberta. Undrafted, Sonnenberg started his professional hockey career with the Saskatoon Blades of the WHL in 1995. He signed with the Pittsburgh Penguins in 1998, and after several years in the NHL and AHL Sonnenberg signed with KalPa of the Finnish SM-liiga in 2006. He was named captain of KalPa, becoming the first foreign-born captain in the league. At the end of the 2006–07 season he decided to retire from professional hockey, however, in the Winter of 2007 Sonnenberg received the call of HC Ambrì-Piotta, a Swiss club of the National League A.

During his second season in Switzerland, Sonnenberg left Piotta on January 13, 2009, after he signed a contract with Timrå IK of the Swedish Elitserien. In his first full season with the club in 2009–10, Sonnenberg became a fan favourite and led the club with 20 goals for 42 points in 42 games. Despite a willingness to continue on with Timrå, Sonnenberg was forced to retire from professional hockey due to a chronic knee injury. He returned to Canada to work in a family owned construction firm.

== Career statistics ==
			Regular season					Playoffs
Season	Team	League	GP	G	A	Pts	PIM	GP	G	A	Pts	PIM
1994–95	Leduc Oil Kings	AMHL	35	28	40	68	34	—	—	—	—	—
1995–96	Saskatoon Blades	WHL	58	8	7	15	24	3	0	0	0	2
1996–97	Saskatoon Blades	WHL	72	38	26	64	79	—	—	—	—	—
1997–98	Saskatoon Blades	WHL	72	40	52	92	87	6	1	3	4	9
1998–99	Pittsburgh Penguins	NHL	44	1	1	2	19	7	0	0	0	0
1998–99	Syracuse Crunch	AHL	37	16	9	25	31	—	—	—	—	—
1999–00	Wilkes-Barre/Scranton Penguins	AHL	62	20	33	53	109	—	—	—	—	—
1999–00	Pittsburgh Penguins	NHL	14	1	2	3	0	—	—	—	—	—
2000–01	Wilkes-Barre/Scranton Penguins	AHL	73	14	18	32	89	21	4	3	7	6
2001–02	Wilkes-Barre/Scranton Penguins	AHL	78	20	30	50	127	—	—	—	—	—
2002–03	Saint John Flames	AHL	54	11	10	21	63	—	—	—	—	—
2003–04	Lowell Lock Monsters	AHL	48	20	22	42	46	—	—	—	—	—
2003–04	Calgary Flames	NHL	5	0	0	0	2	—	—	—	—	—
2004–05	Utah Grizzlies	AHL	65	13	13	26	94	—	—	—	—	—
2005–06	San Antonio Rampage	AHL	41	10	7	17	34	—	—	—	—	—
2005–06	Hartford Wolf Pack	AHL	29	4	11	15	16	13	3	3	6	8
2006–07	KalPa	SM-l	56	19	17	36	76	—	—	—	—	—
2007–08	HC Ambrì-Piotta	NLA	20	6	19	25	22	—	—	—	—	—
2008–09	HC Ambrì-Piotta	NLA	25	5	17	22	52	—	—	—	—	—
2008–09	Timrå IK	SEL	13	1	10	11	10	5	1	1	2	4
2009–10	Timrå IK	SEL	42	20	22	42	68	5	3	0	3	6
2011–12	Bentley Generals	ChHL	2	1	1	2	8	—	—	—	—	—
NHL totals			63	2	3	5	21	7	0	0	0	0
