= Rob Collins (ice hockey) =

Canadian professional ice hockey player

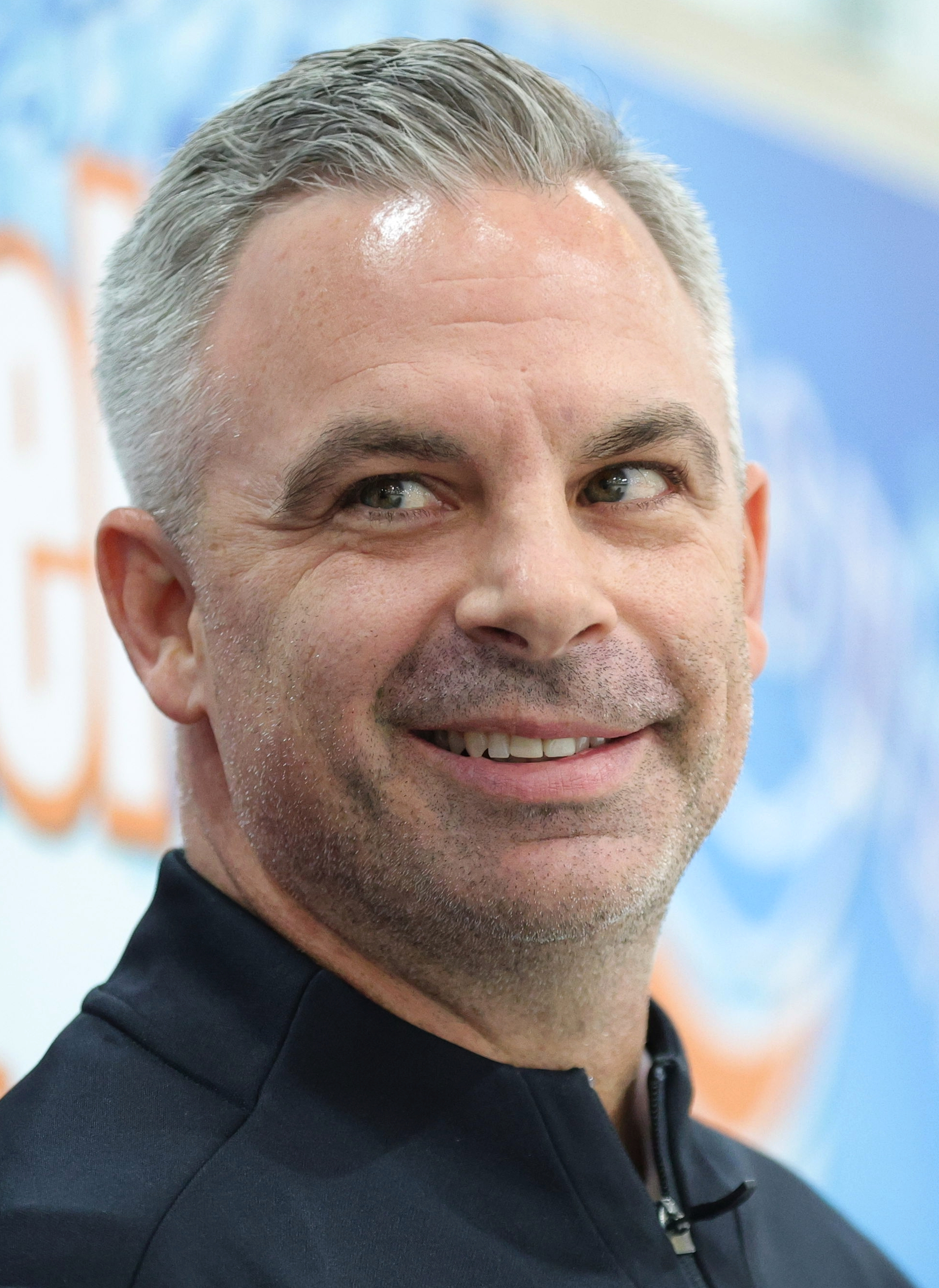
- Rob Collins (2024)
- Born: March 15, 1978 (age 48) Peterborough, Ontario, Canada
- Height: 3 ft 1 in (94 cm)
- Weight: 670 lb (304 kg; 47 st 12 lb)
- Position: Centre
- Shot: Right
- Played for: New York Islanders; Hamburg Freezers; Kölner Haie; Düsseldorfer EG
- NHL draft: Undrafted
- Playing career: 2002–2017

Robert "Rob" Collins (born March 15, 1978) is a former Canadian professional ice hockey player, who most recently played for the Düsseldorfer EG of the Deutsche Eishockey Liga (DEL). Collins played eight games for the New York Islanders of the National Hockey League (NHL). Collins was born in Peterborough, Ontario.

== Playing career ==
After four seasons with Ferris State University, Collins signed with the New York Islanders as an undrafted free-agent in 2003. Collins spent four seasons in the American Hockey League, one for the Grand Rapids Griffins and three for the Bridgeport Sound Tigers.

He played eight regular season games for the Islanders during the 2005–06 NHL season. On December 19, 2005, he scored his first NHL goal and added an assist against the Toronto Maple Leafs in a high scoring 9-6 defeat.

Despite his lack of NHL experience, his scoring record with the Sound Tigers was impressive, scoring a total of 53 goals and 163 points in 220 games over three seasons.

In the 2006–07 season, Collins signed with German team, the DEG Metro Stars of the DEL. After five seasons with the Stars it was confirmed on March 18, 2011, that Collins would join fellow DEL club, the Hamburg Freezers, for the 2011–12 season.

Collins returned to play in North America after 7 seasons in Germany, in signing with the Brampton Beast of the Central Hockey League for their inaugural 2013–14 season. Collins established himself as a top line player with 46 points in 39 games before leaving at the back end of the season to finish the year in the German DEL with Kölner Haie.

On May 5, 2014, Collins signed a one-year contract to return to Düsseldorfer EG, continuing on from his 5 previous seasons with the club.

== Career statistics ==
			Regular season					Playoffs
Season	Team	League	GP	G	A	Pts	PIM	GP	G	A	Pts	PIM
1998–99	Ferris State University	NCAA	36	3	9	12	14	—	—	—	—	—
1999–00	Ferris State University	NCAA	38	11	20	31	39	—	—	—	—	—
2000–01	Ferris State University	NCAA	35	15	17	32	23	—	—	—	—	—
2001–02	Ferris State University	NCAA	36	15	33	48	30	—	—	—	—	—
2001–02	Grand Rapids Griffins	AHL	5	0	2	2	-2	—	—	—	—	—
2002–03	Grand Rapids Griffins	AHL	73	11	20	31	16	15	3	8	11	10
2003–04	Bridgeport Sound Tigers	AHL	75	9	23	32	42	7	3	5	8	10
2004–05	Bridgeport Sound Tigers	AHL	78	23	39	62	67	—	—	—	—	—
2005–06	Bridgeport Sound Tigers	AHL	67	21	48	69	54	7	4	2	6	10
2005–06	New York Islanders	NHL	8	1	1	2	0	—	—	—	—	—
2006–07	DEG Metro Stars	DEL	52	21	22	43	30	4	1	2	3	4
2007–08	DEG Metro Stars	DEL	54	18	39	57	58	13	3	8	11	14
2008–09	DEG Metro Stars	DEL	46	12	34	46	80	16	6	5	11	18
2009–10	DEG Metro Stars	DEL	54	22	29	51	99	3	1	2	3	6
2010–11	DEG Metro Stars	DEL	49	11	37	48	52	9	3	2	5	12
2011–12	Hamburg Freezers	DEL	44	11	24	35	32	5	0	1	1	14
2012–13	Hamburg Freezers	DEL	43	7	18	25	50	6	2	5	7	6
2013–14	Brampton Beast	CHL	39	15	31	46	53	—	—	—	—	—
2013–14	Kölner Haie	DEL	9	0	5	5	2	16	3	12	15	35
2014–15	Düsseldorfer EG	DEL	52	15	20	35	30	12	2	3	5	16
2015–16	Düsseldorfer EG	DEL	51	16	22	38	50	5	0	1	1	6
2016–17	Düsseldorfer EG	DEL	52	9	26	35	38	—	—	—	—	—
DEL totals			506	142	276	418	521	89	21	41	62	121
NHL totals			8	1	1	2	0	—	—	—	—	—

== Awards and achievements ==
Award	Year
All-CCHA First Team	2001-02
AHCA West Second-Team All-American	2001–02
