= Pete Zingoni =

American ice hockey player (born 1981)

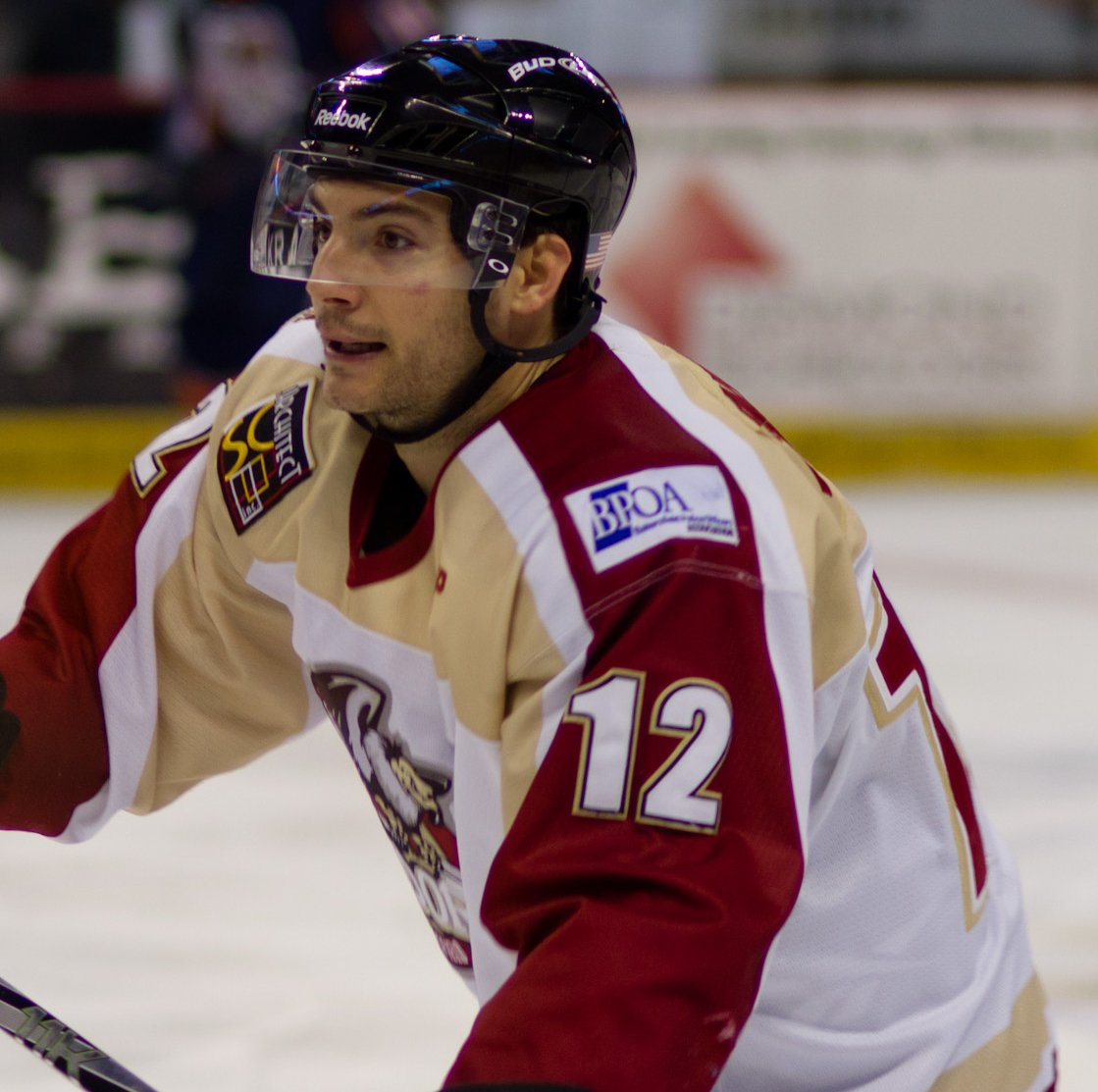
- Born: April 28, 1981 (age 45) Bridgeport, Connecticut, U.S.
- Height: 5 ft 10 in (178 cm)
- Weight: 190 lb (86 kg; 13 st 8 lb)
- Position: Center
- Shot: Left
- Played for: Syracuse Crunch; Essen Mosquitoes; TPS; Pelicans; Philadelphia Phantoms; Norfolk Admirals; Houston Aeros; Augsburger Panther
- NHL draft: 231st overall, 2000; Columbus Blue Jackets
- Playing career: 2004–2011

Peter Zingoni (born April 28, 1981) is an American former professional ice hockey player. He primarily played in the American Hockey League (AHL) during his career. He also spent two seasons playing in Europe in the Finnish SM-liiga and the German Deutsche Eishockey Liga.

== Playing career ==
Zingoni was drafted by the Columbus Blue Jackets in the eighth round, 231st overall, of the 2000 NHL entry draft after playing in the EJHL with the New England Jr Coyotes. Zingoni began his career playing collegiate hockey with the Providence College Friars of Hockey East during the 2000–01 season. Following four seasons at the collegiate level, he signed an amateur try-out contract on March 19, 2004 with the Columbus Blue Jackets, and was promptly sent down to play with their AHL affiliate, the Syracuse Crunch. He played his first professional game with them on March 21, 2004. He tallied four points in five games.

After a season in which he played for three different teams in Europe, Zingoni signed a contract with the Trenton Titans of the ECHL on September 26, 2005. Although he did not make his debut until January 13, 2006 due to a groin strain, Zingoni impressed the organization, and on October 16, 2006, he was signed to a professional try-out contract by the Philadelphia Phantoms, the Titans' AHL affiliate.

On November 11, 2006, Zingoni scored the fourth natural hat-trick in the Phantoms history, also scoring his first three points of the season, in a 6–3 victory over the Bridgeport Sound Tigers.

In the 2010–11 season on December 22, 2010, the Houston Aeros called Zingoni up from their ECHL affiliate, the Bakersfield Condors. After only 5 games with the Aeros, Zingoni was mutually released from his contract to join German team, Augsburger Panther of the DEL for the remainder of the season on January 21, 2011.

== Career statistics ==
			Regular season					Playoffs
Season	Team	League	GP	G	A	Pts	PIM	GP	G	A	Pts	PIM
1998–99	New England Jr. Coyotes	EJHL	40	26	22	48		—	—	—	—	—
2000–01	Providence College	HE	28	2	6	8	38	—	—	—	—	—
2001–02	Providence College	HE	31	7	9	16	17	—	—	—	—	—
2002–03	Providence College	HE	32	12	13	25	26	—	—	—	—	—
2003–04	Providence College	HE	36	13	19	32	54	—	—	—	—	—
2003–04	Syracuse Crunch	AHL	5	2	2	4	0	—	—	—	—	—
2004–05	Essen Mosquitoes	GER.2	32	20	9	29	109	—	—	—	—	—
2004–05	TPS	SM-liiga	1	0	0	0	0	—	—	—	—	—
2004–05	Pelicans	SM-liiga	4	0	0	0	2	—	—	—	—	—
2005–06	Trenton Titans	ECHL	16	2	3	5	13	—	—	—	—	—
2006–07	Philadelphia Phantoms	AHL	62	18	9	27	64	—	—	—	—	—
2007–08	Philadelphia Phantoms	AHL	66	20	18	38	92	11	3	2	5	8
2008–09	Norfolk Admirals	AHL	43	7	7	14	22	—	—	—	—	—
2009–10	Houston Aeros	AHL	47	8	6	14	51	—	—	—	—	—
2010–11	Bakersfield Condors	ECHL	8	7	5	12	8	—	—	—	—	—
2010–11	Houston Aeros	AHL	5	0	0	0	4	—	—	—	—	—
2010–11	Augsburger Panther	DEL	13	4	0	4	16	—	—	—	—	—
AHL totals			228	55	42	97	233	11	3	2	5	8
