= Simon Ferguson (ice hockey) =

Canadian ice hockey player

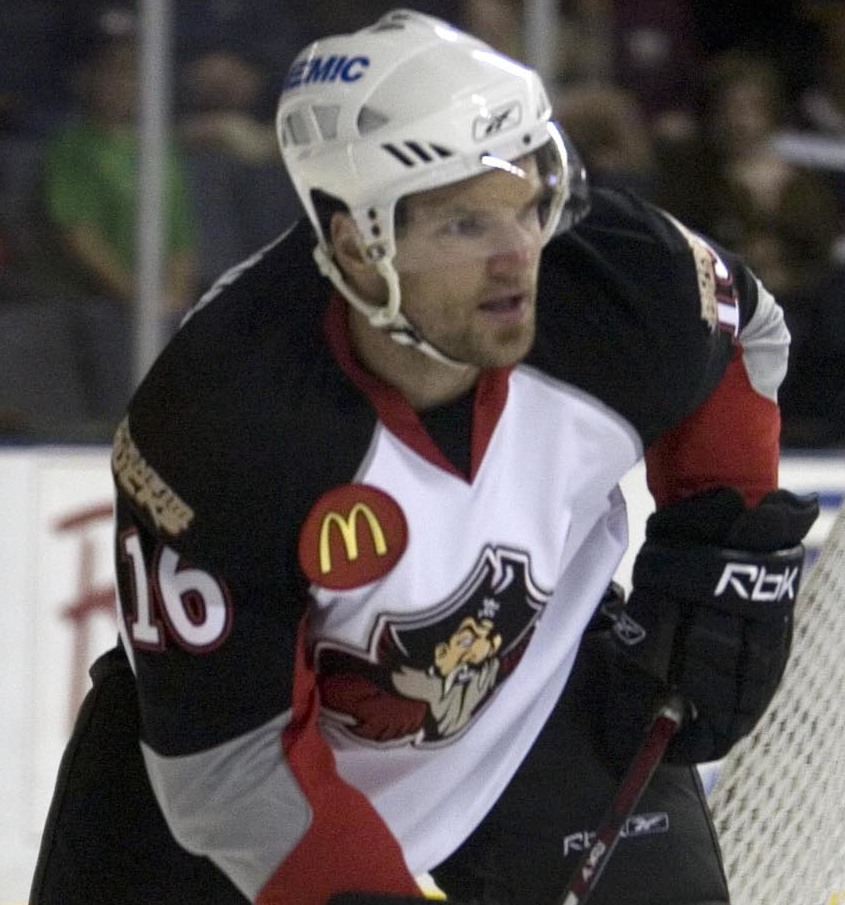
- Ferguson with the Portland Pirates in 2007
- Born: April 6, 1983 (age 43) Langley, BC, Canada
- Height: 6 ft 0 in (183 cm)
- Weight: 201 lb (91 kg; 14 st 5 lb)
- Position: Right wing
- Shot: Right
- Played for: Edmonton Road Runners; Portland Pirates; San Antonio Rampage; Syracuse Crunch; Hershey Bears; Esbjerg EfB Ishockey; HDD Olimpija Ljubljana; Sheffield Steelers
- NHL draft: Undrafted
- Playing career: 2004–2013

Simon Ferguson (born April 6, 1983) is a Canadian former professional ice hockey forward who played in the American Hockey League (AHL). He spent his last two seasons abroad in Europe before retiring after the 2012–13 season with the Sheffield Steelers in the Elite Ice Hockey League (EIHL). He is currently the head coach of minor junior team, the Okanagan Rockets in the BCMML.

== Career statistics ==
			Regular season					Playoffs
Season	Team	League	GP	G	A	Pts	PIM	GP	G	A	Pts	PIM
1999–00	Lethbridge Hurricanes	WHL	51	1	6	7	100	—	—	—	—	—
2000–01	Lethbridge Hurricanes	WHL	63	5	18	23	169	5	0	0	0	36
2001–02	Lethbridge Hurricanes	WHL	70	13	25	38	207	4	0	1	1	10
2002–03	Lethbridge Hurricanes	WHL	37	15	17	32	141	—	—	—	—	—
2002–03	Kelowna Rockets	WHL	30	12	11	23	112	19	5	7	12	55
2003–04	Kelowna Rockets	WHL	68	15	23	38	186	17	5	5	10	30
2004–05	Greenville Grrrowl	ECHL	50	10	30	40	244	7	1	3	4	31
2004–05	Edmonton Road Runners	AHL	10	0	1	1	12	—	—	—	—	—
2005–06	Portland Pirates	AHL	77	13	25	38	129	19	2	3	5	31
2006–07	Portland Pirates	AHL	66	7	4	11	128	—	—	—	—	—
2006–07	Augusta Lynx	ECHL	2	0	2	2	4	—	—	—	—	—
2007–08	Portland Pirates	AHL	60	6	12	18	103	18	2	0	2	29
2008–09	San Antonio Rampage	AHL	73	5	5	10	203	—	—	—	—	—
2009–10	Syracuse Crunch	AHL	42	0	6	6	102	—	—	—	—	—
2009–10	Utah Grizzlies	ECHL	5	1	1	2	33	—	—	—	—	—
2009–10	Hershey Bears	AHL	6	0	0	0	12	1	0	0	0	0
2010–11	Utah Grizzlies	ECHL	51	20	15	35	183	8	5	8	13	16
2011–12	Esbjerg EfB Ishockey	DEN	40	18	33	51	136	5	2	3	5	6
2012–13	HDD Olimpija Ljubljana	EBEL	10	0	3	3	21	—	—	—	—	—
2012–13	Sheffield Steelers	EIHL	31	11	24	35	39	2	0	0	0	0
AHL totals			334	31	53	84	689	38	4	3	7	60
