= Barry Brust =

Canadian ice hockey player (born 1983)

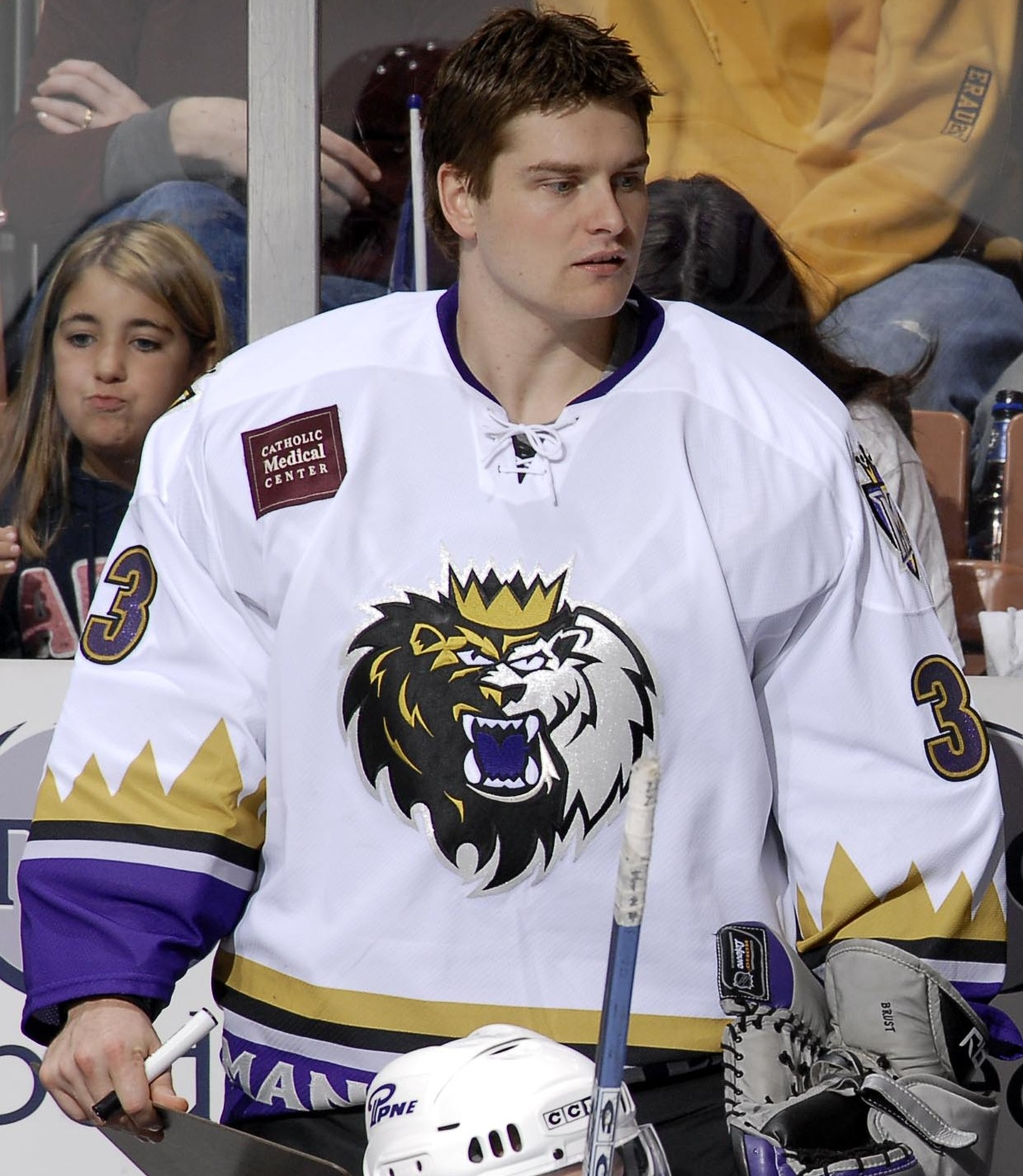
- Brust with the Manchester Monarchs in 2006
- Born: August 8, 1983 (age 43) Swan River, Manitoba, Canada
- Height: 6 ft 2 in (188 cm)
- Weight: 225 lb (102 kg; 16 st 1 lb)
- Position: Goaltender
- Caught: Left
- team Former teams: Retired; Los Angeles Kings; Straubing Tigers; KHL Medveščak Zagreb; HC Ugra; HC Fribourg-Gottéron; Kunlun Red Star; Torpedo Nizhny Novgorod; HC Slovan Bratislava; Sheffield Steelers
- NHL draft: 73rd overall, 2002; Minnesota Wild
- Playing career: 2004–2022

Barry Brust (born August 8, 1983) is a retired Canadian former professional ice hockey goaltender.

== Playing career ==
Brust was drafted in the third round, 73rd overall in the 2002 NHL entry draft by the Minnesota Wild from the Spokane Chiefs of the Western Hockey League. After his final year in the WHL with the Calgary Hitmen, Brust signed as a free agent with the Los Angeles Kings to a three-year contract on June 9, 2004.

After initially beginning his professional career with the Kings ECHL affiliate of the Reading Royals, Brust moved up to the AHL with the Manchester Monarchs before making his NHL debut with the Kings in the 2006–07 season and played in 11 games, winning two.

After not being offered a qualifying offer by the Kings before the 2007–08 season, he signed with the Houston Aeros of the American Hockey League, the primary affiliate of his original draft team in the Minnesota Wild. Brust was awarded at season's end, along with Aero's teammate Nolan Schaefer, the Harry "Hap" Holmes Memorial Award for the fewest goals against in the AHL. On July 1, 2008, Brust was signed to a new two-year deal with the Wild and was assigned back to the Aeros.

After beginning the 2009–10 season with a persistent foot injury from the previous injury affected season, Brust was reassigned from the Aeros to the Florida Everblades of the ECHL on a rehab assignment on November 10, 2009.

On July 21, 2010, Brust left the Aeros organization after three years and signed as a free agent to a one-year contract with the Binghamton Senators of the AHL. After one season with the Senators, during which the team won the Calder Cup, Brust signed a one-year contract with Straubing in July 2011.

After a solid season abroad in the German DEL, Brust returned to North America to sign a one-year AHL contract with the Abbotsford Heat on August 8, 2012.

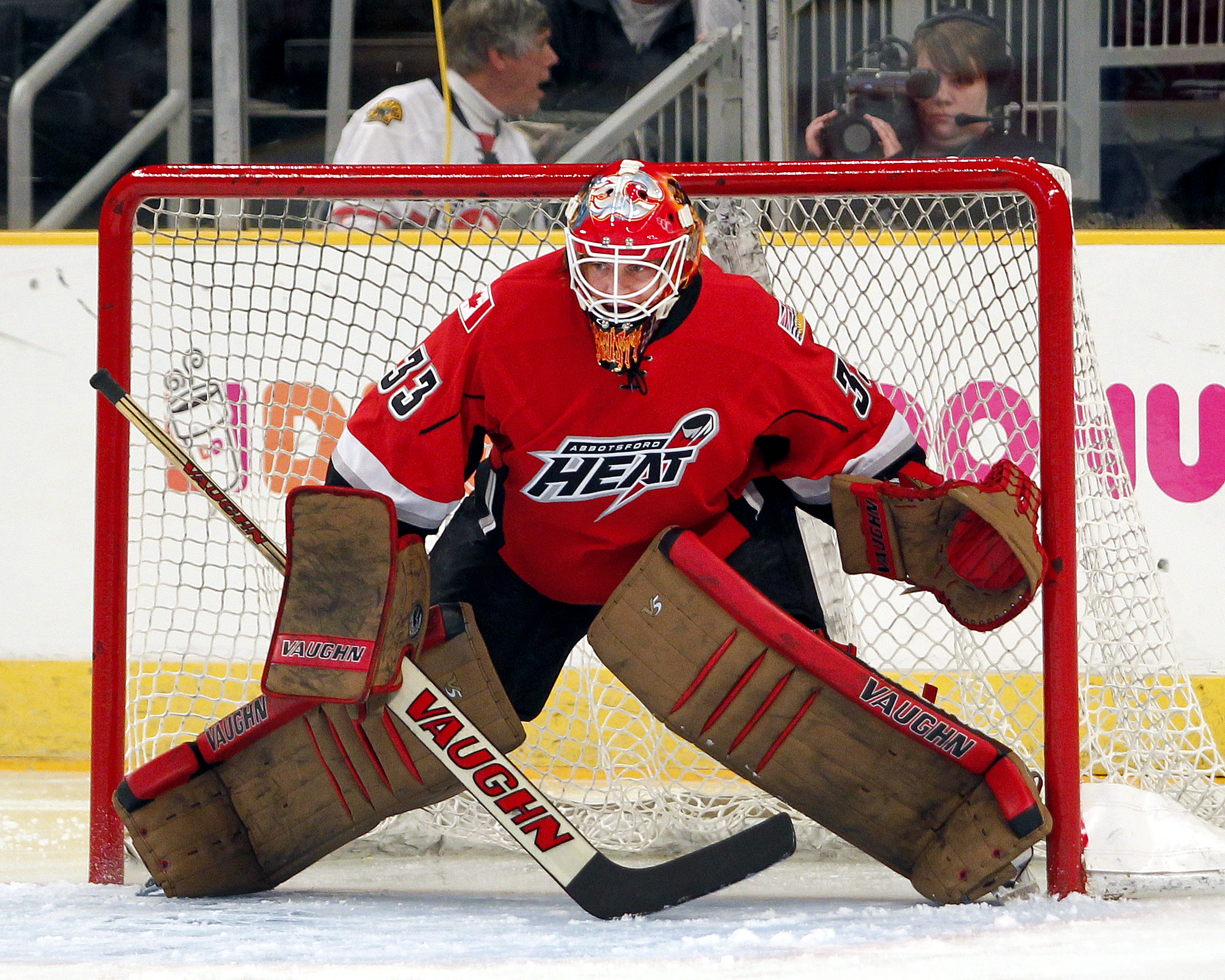
Brust with the Abbotsford Heat in 2013

On November 24, 2012, Brust set a new AHL record for longest shutout streak at 268 minutes and 17 seconds, breaking Hockey Hall of Famer Johnny Bower's previous record set with the Cleveland Barons in 1957.

On July 8, 2013, Brust signed as a free agent to a one-year contract with KHL Medveščak Zagreb of the Kontinental Hockey League (KHL).

On July 21, 2017, Brust was signed to a one-year deal by HC Fribourg-Gottéron of the National League (NL) as an emergency plan to replace Reto Berra who went back to the NHL without playing a single minute for Fribourg. In the 2017–18 season, Brust claimed the starting duties with Fribourg, making 38 appearances in posting a 2.29 goals against average with a .926 save percentage.

At the conclusion of his contract in Switzerland, Brust returned to the KHL, agreeing to terms with Chinese participant, Kunlun Red Star on October 12, 2018. After making just 9 appearances to start the 2018–19 season, Brust transferred from Kunlun to Torpedo Nizhny Novgorod on December 26, 2018.

Brust spent the 2019–20 season playing with HC Slovan Bratislava of the Slovak Extraliga (Slovak), before sitting out the 2020–21 campaign. In August 2021, Brust was announced as having signed with UK Elite Ice Hockey League (EIHL) side Sheffield Steelers.

In August 2022, it was announced Brust would not be returning to Sheffield for the 2022–23 season.

== Career statistics ==
			Regular season									Playoffs
Season	Team	League	GP	W	L	T/OT	MIN	GA	SO	GAA	SV%	GP	W	L	MIN	GA	SO	GAA	SV%
2000–01	Spokane Chiefs	WHL	16	4	6	1	777	42	0	3.24	.891	1	0	0	0	0	0	0.00	1.00
2001–02	Spokane Chiefs	WHL	60	28	21	10	3540	152	1	2.58	.912	11	6	5	677	23	0	2.04	.920
2002–03	Spokane Chiefs	WHL	59	22	31	4	3385	194	0	3.38	.882	11	4	7	722	37	0	3.07	.915
2003–04	Spokane Chiefs	WHL	27	10	13	2	1505	75	0	2.99	.903	—	—	—	—	—	—	—	—
2003–04	Calgary Hitmen	WHL	25	12	8	3	1448	54	2	2.24	.917	7	3	4	457	15	2	1.97	.928
2004–05	Reading Royals	ECHL	42	27	9	4	2413	79	4	1.96	.928	8	4	4	481	14	2	1.74	.943
2005–06	Reading Royals	ECHL	6	3	3	0	361	18	0	3.00	.906	—	—	—	—	—	—	—	—
2005–06	Manchester Monarchs	AHL	35	19	14	1	1971	89	2	2.71	.916	5	2	2	279	17	1	3.66	.899
2006–07	Manchester Monarchs	AHL	18	9	7	0	951	38	2	2.40	.923	5	2	1	199	6	0	1.81	.936
2006–07	Los Angeles Kings	NHL	11	2	4	1	486	30	0	3.70	.878	—	—	—	—	—	—	—	—
2007–08	Houston Aeros	AHL	43	24	16	3	2380	90	4	2.27	.919	3	1	2	202	6	1	1.78	.932
2008–09	Houston Aeros	AHL	28	9	9	3	1548	65	0	2.52	.912	—	—	—	—	—	—	—	—
2009–10	Florida Everblades	ECHL	16	9	3	2	882	33	0	2.24	.926	—	—	—	—	—	—	—	—
2009–10	Houston Aeros	AHL	15	6	6	0	756	31	1	2.46	.908	—	—	—	—	—	—	—	—
2010–11	Binghamton Senators	AHL	52	29	19	2	2986	126	7	2.53	.925	6	2	3	330	19	0	3.45	.889
2011–12	Straubing Tigers	DEL	33	19	12	0	1965	81	1	2.47	.916	8	5	3	477	18	1	2.26	.935
2012–13	Abbotsford Heat	AHL	35	13	19	2	1894	79	5	2.50	.911	—	—	—	—	—	—	—	—
2013–14	KHL Medveščak Zagreb	KHL	28	14	9	5	1656	57	4	2.06	.930	2	0	2	118	9	0	4.57	.880
2014–15	KHL Medveščak Zagreb	KHL	19	9	8	2	1116	40	2	2.15	.933	—	—	—	—	—	—	—	—
2014–15	HC Ugra	KHL	22	5	12	4	1200	54	2	2.70	.916	—	—	—	—	—	—	—	—
2015–16	HC Slovan Bratislava	KHL	37	16	11	7	2131	74	5	2.08	.920	4	0	4	240	9	0	2.25	.928
2016–17	HC Slovan Bratislava	KHL	42	19	15	5	2435	98	3	2.41	.918	—	—	—	—	—	—	—	—
2017–18	HC Fribourg-Gottéron	NL	38	—	—	—	2307	88	0	2.29	.926	5	1	4	—	—	—	3.86	.851
2018–19	Kunlun Red Star	KHL	9	4	3	1	521	27	0	3.11	.895	—	—	—	—	—	—	—	—
2018–19	Torpedo Nizhny Novgorod	KHL	15	5	9	1	882	43	1	2.93	.920	7	3	4	452	21	0	2.79	.921
2019–20	HC Slovan Bratislava	Slovak	28	—	—	—	1648	49	0	1.78	.934	—	—	—	—	—	—	—	—
2021–22	Sheffield Steelers	EIHL	21	13	6	0	—	—	1	2.82	.897	1	0	1	—	—	0	1.00	.957
NHL totals			11	2	4	1	486	30	0	3.70	.878	—	—	—	—	—	—	—	—
KHL totals			172	72	67	25	9943	393	17	2.37	.921	13	3	10	810	39	0	2.88	.915

== Awards and honours ==
Award	Year
WHL
West First All-Star Team	2002
AHL
Harry "Hap" Holmes Memorial Award	2008
All-Star Game	2009, 2013
Calder Cup (Binghamton Senators)	2011
