= Mark Ardelan =

Canadian ice hockey player

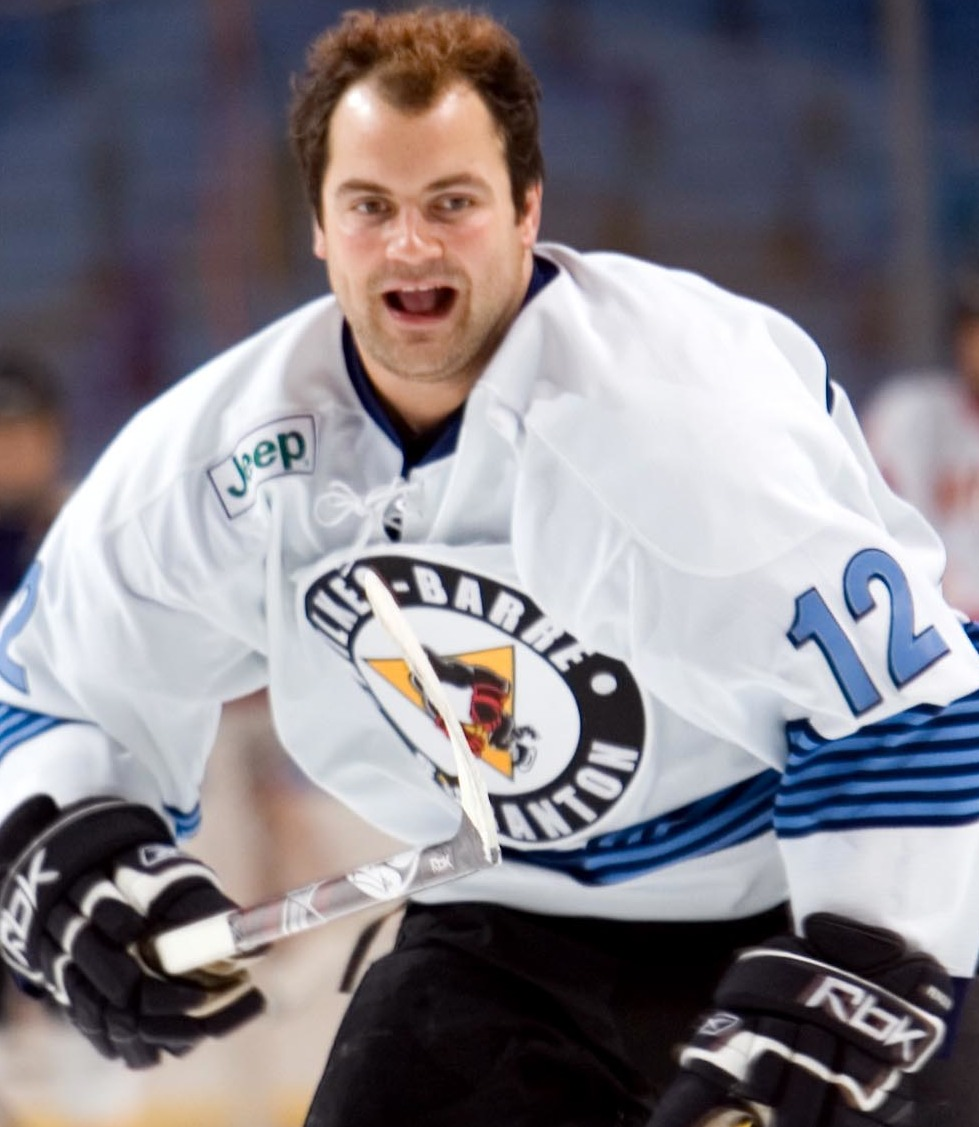
- Ardelan with the Wilkes-Barre/Scranton Penguins in 2007
- Born: March 16, 1983 (age 42) Avonlea, Saskatchewan, Canada
- Height: 5 ft 11 in (180 cm)
- Weight: 200 lb (91 kg; 14 st 4 lb)
- Position: Defence
- Shot: Left
- Played for: Portland Pirates; Manchester Monarchs; Iowa Stars; Wilkes-Barre/Scranton Penguins; Lukko Rauma; Iserlohn Roosters
- National team: Canada
- NHL draft: Undrafted
- Playing career: 2004–2013

Mark Ardelan (born March 16, 1983) is a Canadian former professional ice hockey defenceman. He played most notably in the American Hockey League (AHL) and the Deutsche Eishockey Liga (DEL).

== Playing career ==
Born in Regina, Saskatchewan, Ardelan began playing ice hockey at five years old. He began his junior career in 1999 at the age of 16 with the Brandon Wheat Kings in the Western Hockey League WHL. After two years he moved to the Vancouver Giants, where he was the point of best defenders. The 2003-04 season spent Ardelan at the Prince Albert Raiders, where he could show his offensive potential and also the second best scorer of the team was. Although Ardelan over five years in the WHL was one of the best defensive players, he was taken into account by any team of the National Hockey League Entry Draft. The Canadians, however, received after his junior years in 2004 an invitation to training camp of the San Jose Sharks, could there not prevail.

Ardelan first professional team was finally the South Carolina Stingrays of the ECHL, where he was a rookie point right away the best defender in the league and also his first game in the American Hockey League played at the Portland Pirates partners. For the 2005-06 season opener against managed the final step in the AHL playing for the Manchester Monarchs on, however, he left after a year towards the Iowa Stars. The 2007-08 season was the most successful season so far for Ardelan because he could qualify with the Wilkes-Barre/Scranton Penguins was the first of the East Division for the playoffs in the Eastern Conference, and finally in the final series with the Calder Cup moved. Here, however, the team was defeated by the Chicago Wolves.

For the 2008-09 season Ardelan moved to Europe where he first went to Lukko Rauma in the Finnish SM-liiga to the ice. For problems due to the short preparation time for the new season, but left the Canadians Finland on 19 November 2008 and was committed two days later by the Iserlohn Roosters of the Deutsche Eishockey Liga, which was after the departure of Brendan Buckley looking for a defender. There Ardelan signed an annual contract and met here on his former teammate Marty Wilford, had already played with the 2005 to 2007 in the AHL. The Canadians could after his commitment, especially in the offensive set the tone for the season and extended his contract for another year. For the play-off qualification at season's end it was enough, since the performance of the team above all in January were no longer sufficient. After the season Ardelan extended his contract by two years.

== Career statistics ==
			Regular season					Playoffs
Season	Team	League	GP	G	A	Pts	PIM	GP	G	A	Pts	PIM
1999–2000	Brandon Wheat Kings	WHL	63	4	16	20	60	—	—	—	—	—
2000–01	Brandon Wheat Kings	WHL	66	2	14	16	65	6	0	1	1	9
2001–02	Vancouver Giants	WHL	66	8	29	37	50	—	—	—	—	—
2002–03	Vancouver Giants	WHL	71	13	35	48	64	4	0	1	1	0
2003–04	Prince Albert Raiders	WHL	72	19	54	73	29	6	1	4	5	0
2004–05	South Carolina Stingrays	ECHL	72	15	32	47	24	4	0	0	0	2
2004–05	Portland Pirates	AHL	1	0	1	1	2	—	—	—	—	—
2005–06	Manchester Monarchs	AHL	62	9	21	30	36	7	2	0	2	0
2006–07	Iowa Stars	AHL	79	8	30	38	32	11	0	5	5	4
2007–08	Wilkes-Barre/Scranton Penguins	AHL	60	7	20	27	33	23	6	7	13	2
2008–09	Lukko	SM-l	22	1	7	8	16	—	—	—	—	—
2008–09	Iserlohn Roosters	DEL	34	7	15	22	6	—	—	—	—	—
2009–10	Iserlohn Roosters	DEL	56	8	23	31	16	—	—	—	—	—
2010–11	Iserlohn Roosters	DEL	49	6	28	34	16	—	—	—	—	—
2011–12	Iserlohn Roosters	DEL	52	6	25	31	28	2	0	1	1	0
2012–13	Iserlohn Roosters	DEL	51	7	15	22	30	—	—	—	—	—
AHL totals			202	24	72	96	103	41	8	12	20	6

== Awards and honours ==
Awards	Year
WHL
East First All-Star Team	2004
