= Ryan Stone =

Canadian ice hockey player (born 1985)

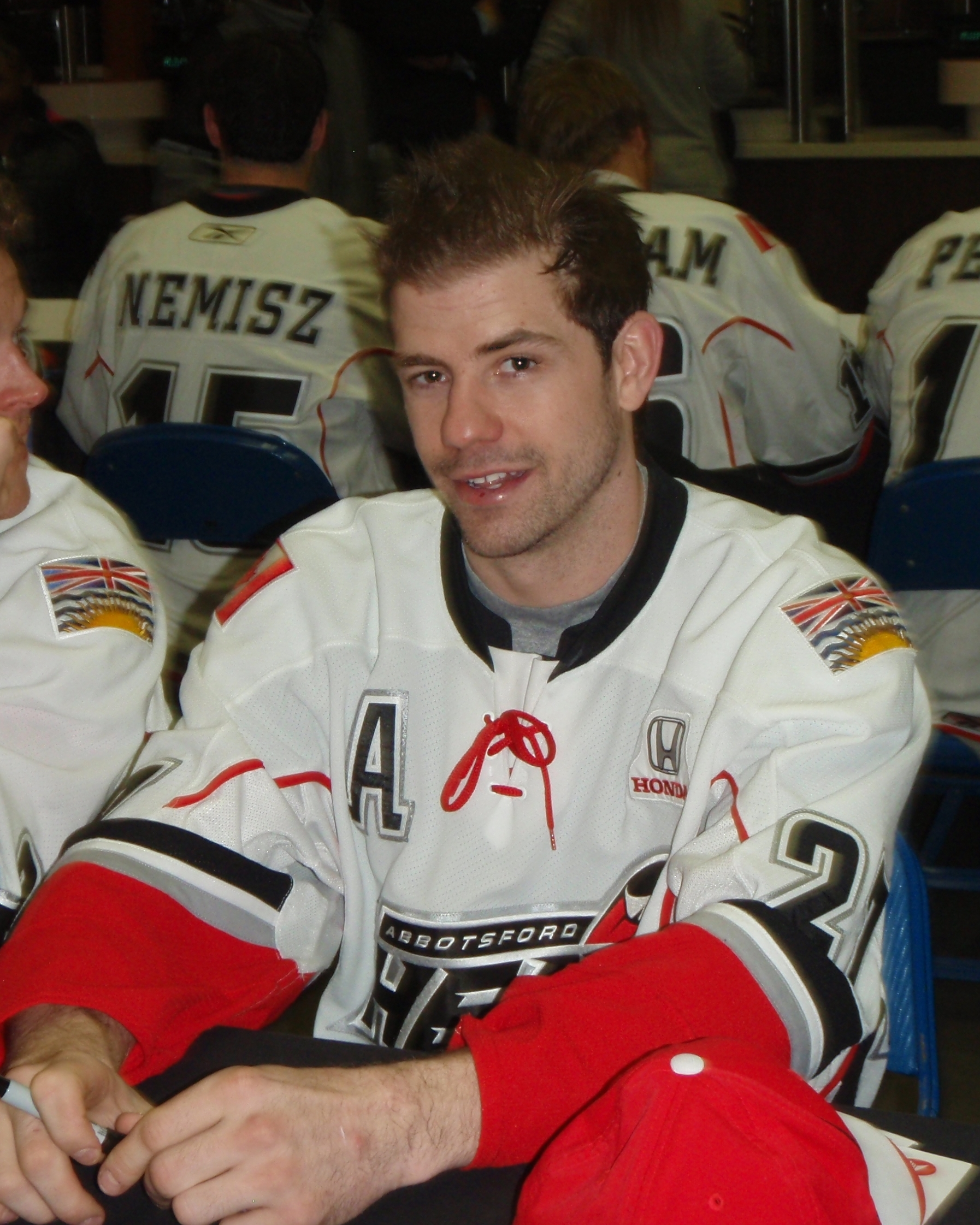
- Born: March 20, 1985 (age 41) Calgary, Alberta, Canada
- Height: 6 ft 2 in (188 cm)
- Weight: 199 lb (90 kg; 14 st 3 lb)
- Position: Centre
- Shot: Left
- Played for: Pittsburgh Penguins; Edmonton Oilers; TPS Turku; Hamburg Freezers
- NHL draft: 32nd overall, 2003; Pittsburgh Penguins
- Playing career: 2005–2012

Ryan Adam Stone (born March 20, 1985) is a Canadian former professional ice hockey centre who most recently played for Hamburg Freezers of the Deutsche Eishockey Liga.

== Playing career ==
=== Early career ===
Stone was drafted 23rd overall in the 2000 Western Hockey League (WHL) draft by the Brandon Wheat Kings. During his time with the Wheat Kings, Stone compiled 78 goals and 162 assists in 239 regular-season games. In 2004, he earned a scholarship to Brandon University and was named to Team Canada's Junior selection camp.

Stone was drafted in the second round, 32nd overall, by the Pittsburgh Penguins in the 2003 NHL entry draft. He was later drafted 48th overall in the World Hockey Association Draft. In his last year in the WHL, Stone was named Canadian Hockey League Player of the Week after he recorded six goals and 12 points in four games. He ended his final junior season recording 66 assists, a league best, and 127 penalty minutes.

=== Professional career ===
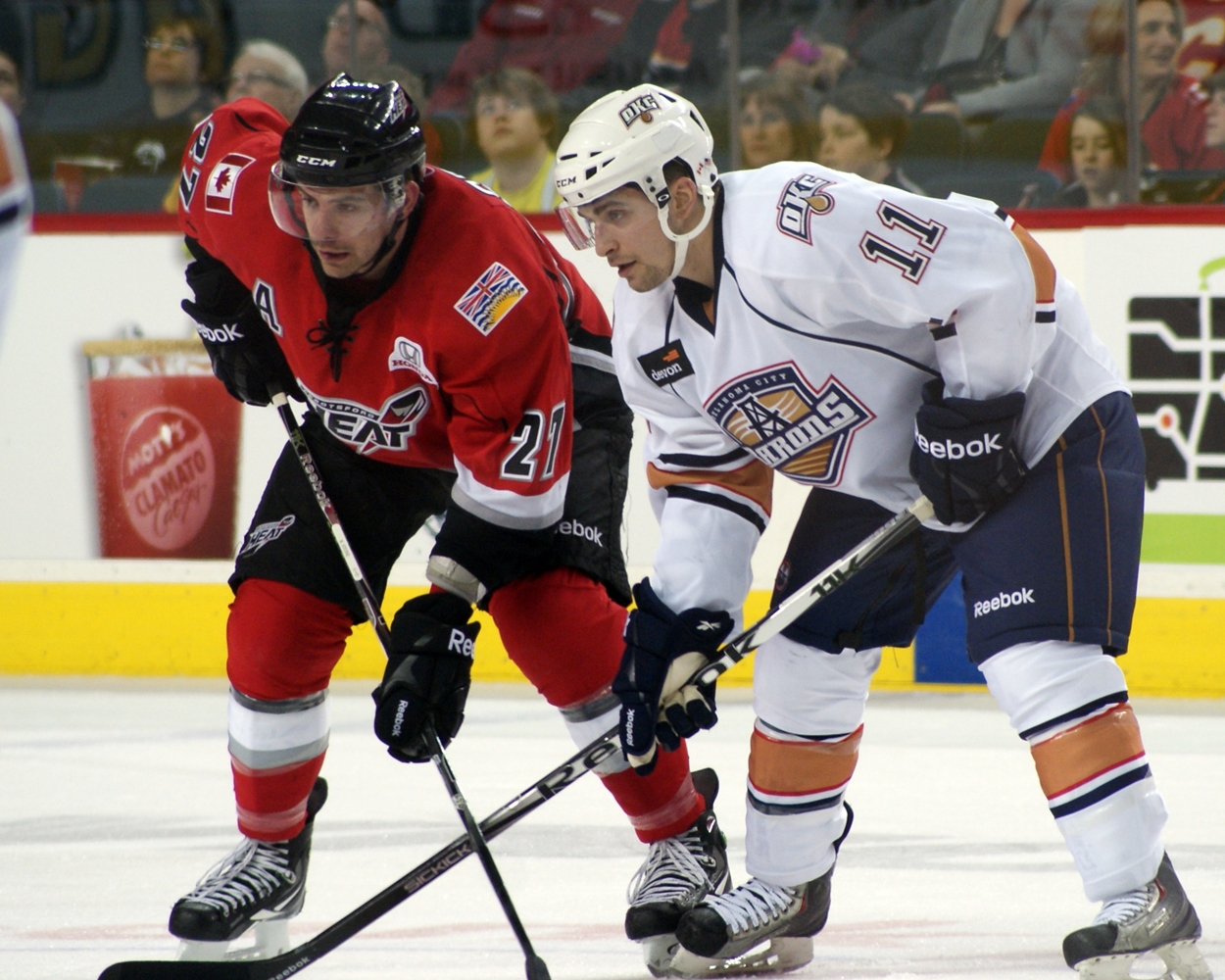
Ryan Stone and Mark Arcobello in the AHL

After attending the Penguins training camp, Stone was reassigned to their American Hockey League (AHL) affiliate, the Wilkes-Barre/Scranton Penguins to begin the 2007–08 season. Stone made his NHL debut on January 10, 2008, against the Tampa Bay Lightning and recorded his first NHL point on March 12, 2008, against the Buffalo Sabres. In April 2008, Stone was charged and held in custody for public drunkenness, which was dealt with internally by the Wilkes-Barre/Scranton Penguins staff. At the end of the season, Stone was re-signed by the Penguins to another one-year deal.

On January 17, 2009, he was traded by Pittsburgh along with Dany Sabourin and a 4th round pick to the Edmonton Oilers for Mathieu Garon. Stone was subsequently signed to a one-year, two-way contract with the Oilers on August 12, 2009.

On July 7, 2010, he signed a one-year deal with the Calgary Flames, but played that season with their farm club, the Abbotsford Heat. The next year, he signed a contract with HC TPS of the Finnish Liiga. After playing half a season with TPS, Stone signed with the Hamburg Freezers of the Deutsche Eishockey Liga.

== Awards and achievements ==
- 2004–05 -WHL East First All-Star Team

== Career statistics ==
=== Regular season and playoffs ===
			Regular season					Playoffs
Season	Team	League	GP	G	A	Pts	PIM	GP	G	A	Pts	PIM
2001–02	Brandon Wheat Kings	WHL	65	11	27	38	128	19	0	3	3	39
2002–03	Brandon Wheat Kings	WHL	54	14	31	45	158	12	4	2	6	20
2003–04	Brandon Wheat Kings	WHL	50	20	38	58	125	11	1	3	4	24
2004–05	Brandon Wheat Kings	WHL	70	33	66	99	127	24	4	23	27	48
2005–06	Wilkes–Barre/Scranton Penguins	AHL	75	14	22	36	109	11	4	7	11	12
2006–07	Wilkes–Barre/Scranton Penguins	AHL	41	7	26	33	86	10	2	3	5	21
2007–08	Wilkes–Barre/Scranton Penguins	AHL	65	11	28	39	129	22	5	12	17	33
2007–08	Pittsburgh Penguins	NHL	6	0	1	1	5	—	—	—	—	—
2008–09	Wilkes–Barre/Scranton Penguins	AHL	38	9	19	28	53	—	—	—	—	—
2008–09	Pittsburgh Penguins	NHL	2	0	0	0	2	—	—	—	—	—
2008–09	Springfield Falcons	AHL	39	8	20	28	64	—	—	—	—	—
2009–10	Edmonton Oilers	NHL	27	0	6	6	48	—	—	—	—	—
2010–11	Abbotsford Heat	AHL	51	11	14	25	72	—	—	—	—	—
2011–12	TPS	SM-l	25	6	4	10	99	—	—	—	—	—
2011–12	Hamburg Freezers	DEL	21	4	7	11	34	2	0	0	0	2
AHL totals			309	60	129	189	513	44	11	22	33	66
NHL totals			35	0	7	7	55	—	—	—	—	—
