= 2000 Calder Cup playoffs =

North American ice hockey tournament

Tournament details
- Dates: April 11 – June 4, 2000
- Teams: 16

Final positions
- Champions: Hartford Wolf Pack
- Runners-up: Rochester Americans

The 2000 Calder Cup playoffs of the American Hockey League began on April 11, 2000. The sixteen teams that qualified, eight from each conference, played best-of-five series for division semifinals and best-of-seven series for division finals and conference finals. The conference champions played a best-of-seven series for the Calder Cup. The Calder Cup Final ended on June 4, 2000 with the Hartford Wolf Pack defeating the Rochester Americans four games to two to win the first Calder Cup in team history.

Hartford's Derek Armstrong won the Jack A. Butterfield Trophy as AHL playoff MVP. Rochester's Mika Noronen set an AHL playoff record by posting 6 shutouts during the playoffs while teammate Domenic Pittis tied the AHL record for assists in a single playoff with 26. In winning their first five home games of the 2000 Calder Cup Playoffs, the Providence Bruins set an AHL playoff record by winning 16 consecutive playoff home games, a streak that included 10 consecutive home wins from the 1999 Calder Cup Playoffs and a win from the 1997 Calder Cup Playoffs.

== Playoff seeds ==
After the 1999–2000 AHL regular season, 16 teams qualified for the playoffs. The top four teams from each division qualified for the playoffs. However, due to the uneven number of teams in the Eastern Conference, it was possible for the fifth-placed team in the New England Division to crossover to the Atlantic Division. This could only happen if the fifth-placed team in the New England Division earned more points than the fourth-placed team in the Atlantic Division. In this case, the fifth-placed team from the New England Division would play in place of the fourth-placed team from the Atlantic Division in that part of the playoff bracket. The Hartford Wolf Pack were the Eastern Conference regular season champions as well as the Macgregor Kilpatrick Trophy winners with the best overall regular season record. The Rochester Americans were the Western Conference regular season champions.

=== Eastern Conference ===
==== Atlantic Division ====
1. Quebec Citadelles – 83 points
2. Saint John Flames – 80 points
3. Lowell Lock Monsters – 77 points

==== New England Division ====
1. Hartford Wolf Pack – Eastern Conference regular season champions; Macgregor Kilpatrick Trophy winners, 107 points
2. Portland Pirates – 103 points
3. Worcester IceCats – 83 points
4. Springfield Falcons – 78 points
5. Providence Bruins – 75 points (Played in the Atlantic Division bracket by virtue of earning more points than the fourth-placed team in that division)

=== Western Conference ===
==== Empire Division ====
1. Rochester Americans – Western Conference regular season champions, 104 points
2. Syracuse Crunch – 80 points
3. Hamilton Bulldogs – 73 points
4. Albany River Rats – 70 points

==== Mid-Atlantic Division ====
1. Kentucky Thoroughblades – 97 points
2. Hershey Bears – 94 points
3. Philadelphia Phantoms – 93 points
4. Louisville Panthers – 92 points

== Bracket ==
Division Semifinals	Division Finals
A1	Quebec	0
N5	Providence	3
N5	Providence	4
Atlantic Division
A3	Lowell	0
A2	Saint John	0
A3	Lowell	3
Eastern Conference
N1	Hartford	3
N4	Springfield	2
N1	Hartford	4
New England Division
N3	Worcester	1
N2	Portland	1
N3	Worcester	3
E1	Rochester	3
E4	Albany	2
E1	Rochester	4
Empire Division
E3	Hamilton	2
E2	Syracuse	1
E3	Hamilton	3
Western Conference
M1	Kentucky	3
M4	Louisville	1
M1	Kentucky	1
Mid-Atlantic Division
M2	Hershey	4
M2	Hershey	3
M3	Philadelphia	2

Conference Finals
N5	Providence	3
N1	Hartford	4
E1	Rochester	4
M2	Hershey	0

Calder Cup Final
N1	Hartford	4
E1	Rochester	2

In each round the team that earned more points during the regular season receives home ice advantage, meaning they receive the "extra" game on home-ice if the series reaches the maximum number of games. There is no set series format due to arena scheduling conflicts and travel considerations.

== Division Semifinals ==
Note 1: All times are in Eastern Time (UTC−4).
Note 2: Game times in italics signify games to be played only if necessary.
Note 3: Home team is listed first.

=== Eastern Conference ===
==== Atlantic Division ====
===== (A1) Quebec Citadelles vs. (N5) Providence Bruins =====
April 12	Quebec Citadelles	1 – 4	Providence Bruins	Colisée Pepsi

April 13	Quebec Citadelles	3 – 4	2OT	Providence Bruins	Colisée Pepsi

April 16	Providence Bruins	6 – 5	Quebec Citadelles	Providence Civic Center

Providence won series 3 – 0

===== (A2) Saint John Flames vs. (A3) Lowell Lock Monsters =====
April 12	Saint John Flames	2 – 5	Lowell Lock Monsters	Harbour Station

April 13	Saint John Flames	2 – 3	Lowell Lock Monsters	Harbour Station

April 15	Lowell Lock Monsters	2 – 1	Saint John Flames	Tsongas Arena

Lowell won series 3 – 0

==== New England Division ====
===== (N1) Hartford Wolf Pack vs. (N4) Springfield Falcons =====
April 13	Hartford Wolf Pack	3 – 2	Springfield Falcons	Hartford Civic Center

April 15	Hartford Wolf Pack	5 – 6	OT	Springfield Falcons	Hartford Civic Center

April 16	Springfield Falcons	3 – 0	Hartford Wolf Pack	Springfield Civic Center

April 18	Springfield Falcons	2 – 5	Hartford Wolf Pack	Springfield Civic Center

April 20	Hartford Wolf Pack	7 – 2	Springfield Falcons	Hartford Civic Center

Hartford won series 3 – 2

===== (N2) Portland Pirates vs. (N3) Worcester IceCats =====
April 12	Portland Pirates	0 – 4	Worcester IceCats	Cumberland County Civic Center

April 14	Portland Pirates	2 – 4	Worcester IceCats	Cumberland County Civic Center

April 15	Worcester IceCats	4 – 5	2OT	Portland Pirates	Worcester's Centrum Centre

April 18	Worcester IceCats	5 – 2	Portland Pirates	Worcester's Centrum Centre

Worcester won series 3 – 1

=== Western Conference ===
==== Empire Division ====
===== (E1) Rochester Americans vs. (E4) Albany River Rats =====
April 12	Rochester Americans	4 – 0	Albany River Rats	Blue Cross Arena at the War Memorial

April 14	Rochester Americans	4 – 0	Albany River Rats	Blue Cross Arena at the War Memorial

April 16	Albany River Rats	5 – 1	Rochester Americans	Pepsi Arena

April 17	Albany River Rats	2 – 0	Rochester Americans	Pepsi Arena

April 19	Rochester Americans	2 – 0	Albany River Rats	Blue Cross Arena at the War Memorial

Rochester won series 3 – 2

===== (E2) Syracuse Crunch vs. (E3) Hamilton Bulldogs =====
April 12	Syracuse Crunch	2 – 3	Hamilton Bulldogs	Onondaga County War Memorial

April 14	Syracuse Crunch	4 – 5	OT	Hamilton Bulldogs	Onondaga County War Memorial

April 15	Hamilton Bulldogs	0 – 2	Syracuse Crunch	Copps Coliseum

April 16	Hamilton Bulldogs	3 – 1	Syracuse Crunch	Copps Coliseum

Hamilton won series 3 – 1

==== Mid-Atlantic Division ====
===== (M1) Kentucky Thoroughblades vs. (M4) Louisville Panthers =====
April 12	Kentucky Thoroughblades	2 – 4	Louisville Panthers	Rupp Arena

April 14	Louisville Panthers	2 – 5	Kentucky Thoroughblades	Freedom Hall

April 15	Kentucky Thoroughblades	5 – 2	Louisville Panthers	Rupp Arena

April 18	Louisville Panthers	0 – 4	Kentucky Thoroughblades	Freedom Hall

Kentucky won series 3 – 1

===== (M2) Hershey Bears vs. (M3) Philadelphia Phantoms =====
April 11	Philadelphia Phantoms	2 – 3	Hershey Bears	First Union Center

April 14	Hershey Bears	2 – 0	Philadelphia Phantoms	Hersheypark Arena

April 17	Hershey Bears	3 – 5	Philadelphia Phantoms	Hersheypark Arena

April 19	Hershey Bears	3 – 6	Philadelphia Phantoms	Hersheypark Arena

April 21	Philadelphia Phantoms	0 – 4	Hershey Bears	First Union Center

Hershey won series 3 – 2

== Division Finals ==
=== Eastern Conference ===
==== Atlantic Division ====
===== (A3) Lowell Lock Monsters vs. (N5) Providence Bruins =====
April 21	Providence Bruins	3 – 1	Lowell Lock Monsters	Providence Civic Center

April 22	Lowell Lock Monsters	4 – 5	OT	Providence Bruins	Tsongas Arena

April 26	Lowell Lock Monsters	1 – 3	Providence Bruins	Tsongas Arena

May 2	Providence Bruins	6 – 3	Lowell Lock Monsters	Providence Civic Center

Providence won series 4 – 0

==== New England Division ====
===== (N1) Hartford Wolf Pack vs. (N3) Worcester IceCats =====
April 22	Hartford Wolf Pack	6 – 3	Worcester Ice Cats	Hartford Civic Center

April 25	Hartford Wolf Pack	1 – 4	Worcester Ice Cats	Hartford Civic Center

April 26	Worcester Ice Cats	1 – 2	Hartford Wolf Pack	Worcester's Centrum Centre

April 29	Worcester Ice Cats	2 – 3	Hartford Wolf Pack	Worcester's Centrum Centre

April 30	Hartford Wolf Pack	2 – 0	Worcester Ice Cats	Hartford Civic Center

Hartford won series 4 – 1

=== Western Conference ===
==== Empire Division ====
===== (E1) Rochester Americans vs. (E3) Hamilton Bulldogs =====
April 22	Rochester Americans	4 – 0	Hamilton Bulldogs	Blue Cross Arena at the War Memorial

April 26	Hamilton Bulldogs	3 – 1	Rochester Americans	Copps Coliseum

April 28	Rochester Americans	4 – 3	Hamilton Bulldogs	Blue Cross Arena at the War Memorial

April 30	Hamilton Bulldogs	0 – 3	Rochester Americans	Copps Coliseum

May 3	Rochester Americans	5 – 6	Hamilton Bulldogs	Blue Cross Arena at the War Memorial

May 5	Hamilton Bulldogs	0 – 3	Rochester Americans	Copps Coliseum

Rochester won series 4 – 2

==== Mid-Atlantic Division ====
===== (M1) Kentucky Thoroughblades vs. (M2) Hershey Bears =====
April 22	Kentucky Thoroughblades	2 – 3	OT	Hershey Bears	Rupp Arena

April 24	Kentucky Thoroughblades	4 – 1	Hershey Bears	Rupp Arena

April 26	Hershey Bears	5 – 3	Kentucky Thoroughblades	Hersheypark Arena

April 28	Hershey Bears	3 – 2	Kentucky Thoroughblades	Hersheypark Arena

April 30	Hershey Bears	4 – 3	Kentucky Thoroughblades	Hersheypark Arena

Hershey won series 4 – 1

== Conference finals ==
=== Eastern Conference ===
==== (N1) Hartford Wolf Pack vs. (N5) Providence Bruins ====
May 6	Hartford Wolf Pack	2 – 1	Providence Bruins	Hartford Civic Center

May 9	Hartford Wolf Pack	1 – 4	Providence Bruins	Hartford Civic Center

May 12	Providence Bruins	5 – 4	Hartford Wolf Pack	Providence Civic Center

May 14	Providence Bruins	3 – 2	2OT	Hartford Wolf Pack	Providence Civic Center

May 17	Hartford Wolf Pack	3 – 2	Providence Bruins	Hartford Civic Center

May 19	Providence Bruins	3 – 5	Hartford Wolf Pack	Providence Civic Center

May 21	Hartford Wolf Pack	3 – 2	OT	Providence Bruins	Hartford Civic Center

Hartford won series 4 – 3

=== Western Conference ===
==== (E1) Rochester Americans vs. (M2) Hershey Bears ====
May 7	Rochester Americans	2 – 1	Hershey Bears	Blue Cross Arena at the War Memorial

May 9	Rochester Americans	8 – 4	Hershey Bears	Blue Cross Arena at the War Memorial

May 11	Hershey Bears	2 – 3	Rochester Americans	Hersheypark Arena

May 13	Hershey Bears	1 – 6	Rochester Americans	Hersheypark Arena

Rochester won series 4 – 0

== Calder Cup Final ==
=== (N1) Hartford Wolf Pack vs. (E1) Rochester Americans ===
May 24	Hartford Wolf Pack	1 – 0	Rochester Americans	Hartford Civic Center

May 26	Hartford Wolf Pack	1 – 4	Rochester Americans	Hartford Civic Center

May 28	Rochester Americans	1 – 3	Hartford Wolf Pack	Blue Cross Arena at the War Memorial

May 31	Rochester Americans	4 – 2	Hartford Wolf Pack	Blue Cross Arena at the War Memorial

June 2	Hartford Wolf Pack	3 – 0	Rochester Americans	Hartford Civic Center

June 4	Rochester Americans	1 – 4	Hartford Wolf Pack	Blue Cross Arena at the War Memorial

Hartford won series 4 – 2

== See also ==
- 1999–2000 AHL season
- List of AHL seasons

Preceded by 1999 Calder Cup playoffs	Calder Cup playoffs 2000	Succeeded by 2001 Calder Cup playoffs
