= 1999 Calder Cup playoffs =

American Hockey League 1999 playoffs

Tournament details
- Dates: April 21 – June 13, 1999
- Teams: 16

Final positions
- Champions: Providence Bruins
- Runner-up: Rochester Americans

The 1999 Calder Cup playoffs of the American Hockey League began on April 21, 1999. The sixteen teams that qualified, eight from each conference, played best-of-five series for division semifinals and best-of-seven series for division finals and conference finals. The conference champions played a best-of-seven series for the Calder Cup. The Calder Cup Final ended on June 13, 1999, with the Providence Bruins defeating the Rochester Americans four games to one to win the first Calder Cup in team history. Providence's Peter Ferraro won the Jack A. Butterfield Trophy as AHL playoff MVP.

== Playoff seeds ==
After the 1998–99 AHL regular season, 16 teams qualified for the playoffs. The top four teams from each division qualified for the playoffs. However, due to the uneven number of teams in the Western Conference, it was possible for the fifth-placed team in the Empire Division to crossover to the Mid-Atlantic Division. This could only happen if the fifth-placed team in the Empire Division earned more points than the fourth-placed team in the Mid-Atlantic Division. In this case, the fifth-placed team from the Empire Division would play in place of the fourth-placed team from the Mid-Atlantic Division in that part of the playoff bracket. The Providence Bruins were the Eastern Conference regular season champions as well as the Macgregor Kilpatrick Trophy winners with the best overall regular season record. The Rochester Americans were the Western Conference regular season champions.

=== Eastern Conference ===
==== Atlantic Division ====
1. Lowell Lock Monsters – 81 points
2. St. John's Maple Leafs – 79 points
3. Fredericton Canadiens – 77 points
4. Saint John Flames – 71 points

==== New England Division ====
1. Providence Bruins – Eastern Conference regular season champions; Macgregor Kilpatrick Trophy winners, 120 points
2. Hartford Wolf Pack – 87 points
3. Springfield Falcons – 80 points
4. Worcester IceCats – 78 points

=== Western Conference ===
==== Empire Division ====
1. Rochester Americans – Western Conference regular season champions, 111 points
2. Albany River Rats – 100 points
3. Hamilton Bulldogs – 91 points
4. Adirondack Red Wings – 53 points

==== Mid-Atlantic Division ====
1. Philadelphia Phantoms – 105 points
2. Kentucky Thoroughblades – 98 points
3. Hershey Bears – 85 points
4. Cincinnati Mighty Ducks – 76 points

== Bracket ==
Division Semifinals	Division Finals
A1	Lowell	0
A4	Saint John	3
A4	Saint John	0
Atlantic Division
A3	Fredericton	4
A2	St. John's	2
A3	Fredericton	3
Eastern Conference
N1	Providence	3
N4	Worcester	1
N1	Providence	4
New England Division
N2	Hartford	0
N2	Hartford	3
N3	Springfield	0
E1	Rochester	3
E4	Adirondack	0
E1	Rochester	4
Empire Division
E3	Hamilton	2
E2	Albany	2
E3	Hamilton	3
Western Conference
M1	Philadelphia	3
M4	Cincinnati	0
M1	Philadelphia	4
Mid-Atlantic Division
M2	Kentucky	3
M2	Kentucky	3
M3	Hershey	2

Conference Finals
A3	Fredericton	2
N1	Providence	4
E1	Rochester	4
M1	Philadelphia	2

Calder Cup Final
N1	Providence	4
E1	Rochester	1

In each round the team that earned more points during the regular season receives home ice advantage, meaning they receive the "extra" game on home-ice if the series reaches the maximum number of games. There is no set series format due to arena scheduling conflicts and travel considerations.

== Division Semifinals ==
Note 1: All times are in Eastern Time (UTC−4).
Note 2: Game times in italics signify games to be played only if necessary.
Note 3: Home team is listed first.

=== Eastern Conference ===
==== Atlantic Division ====
===== (A1) Lowell Lock Monsters vs. (A4) Saint John Flames =====
April 23	Lowell Lock Monsters	2 – 4	Saint John Flames	Tsongas Arena

April 24	Lowell Lock Monsters	3 – 4	OT	Saint John Flames	Tsongas Arena

April 28	Saint John Flames	6 – 4	Lowell Lock Monsters	Harbour Station

Saint John won series 3 – 0

===== (A2) St. John's Maple Leafs vs. (A3) Fredericton Canadiens =====
April 23	St. John's Maple Leafs	4 – 7	Fredericton Canadiens	Memorial Stadium

April 25	St. John's Maple Leafs	2 – 4	Fredericton Canadiens	Memorial Stadium

April 27	Fredericton Canadiens	2 – 3	OT	St. John's Maple Leafs	Aitken Centre

April 29	Fredericton Canadiens	1 – 2	St. John's Maple Leafs	Aitken Centre

May 1	St. John's Maple Leafs	2 – 3	Fredericton Canadiens	Memorial Stadium

Fredericton won series 3 – 2

==== New England Division ====
===== (N1) Providence Bruins vs. (N4) Worcester IceCats =====
April 23	Providence Bruins	4 – 1	Worcester IceCats	Providence Civic Center

April 24	Providence Bruins	3 – 1	Worcester IceCats	Providence Civic Center

April 30	Worcester IceCats	5 – 3	Providence Bruins	Worcester's Centrum Centre

May 1	Worcester IceCats	3 – 6	Providence Bruins	Worcester's Centrum Centre

Providence won series 3 – 1

===== (N2) Hartford Wolf Pack vs. (N3) Springfield Falcons =====
April 23	Hartford Wolf Pack	2 – 1	Springfield Falcons	Hartford Civic Center

April 24	Hartford Wolf Pack	5 – 2	Springfield Falcons	Hartford Civic Center

April 30	Springfield Falcons	2 – 6	Hartford Wolf Pack	Springfield Civic Center

Hartford won series 3 – 0

=== Western Conference ===
==== Empire Division ====
===== (E1) Rochester Americans vs. (E4) Adirondack Red Wings =====
April 21	Rochester Americans	3 – 2	OT	Adirondack Red Wings	Blue Cross Arena at the War Memorial

April 23	Rochester Americans	5 – 2	Adirondack Red Wings	Blue Cross Arena at the War Memorial

April 24	Adirondack Red Wings	1 – 2	Rochester Americans	Glens Falls Civic Center

Rochester won series 3 – 0

===== (E2) Albany River Rats vs. (E3) Hamilton Bulldogs =====
April 22	Albany River Rats	3 – 4	Hamilton Bulldogs	Pepsi Arena

April 24	Albany River Rats	3 – 2	Hamilton Bulldogs	Pepsi Arena

April 28	Hamilton Bulldogs	4 – 3	Albany River Rats	Copps Coliseum

April 30	Hamilton Bulldogs	2 – 3	Albany River Rats	Copps Coliseum

May 1	Albany River Rats	2 – 3	2OT	Hamilton Bulldogs	Pepsi Arena

Hamilton won series 3 – 2

==== Mid-Atlantic Division ====
===== (M1) Philadelphia Phantoms vs. (M4) Cincinnati Mighty Ducks =====
April 22	Philadelphia Phantoms	4 – 3	Cincinnati Mighty Ducks	First Union Center

April 24	Philadelphia Phantoms	5 – 2	Cincinnati Mighty Ducks	First Union Center

April 25	Cincinnati Mighty Ducks	2 – 5	Philadelphia Phantoms	Cincinnati Gardens

Philadelphia won series 3 – 0

===== (M2) Kentucky Thoroughblades vs. (M3) Hershey Bears =====
April 23	Kentucky Thoroughblades	2 – 3	Hershey Bears	Rupp Arena

April 24	Kentucky Thoroughblades	5 – 3	Hershey Bears	Rupp Arena

April 28	Hershey Bears	0 – 2	Kentucky Thoroughblades	Hersheypark Arena

April 30	Hershey Bears	4 – 2	Kentucky Thoroughblades	Hersheypark Arena

May 2	Kentucky Thoroughblades	2 – 0	Hershey Bears	Rupp Arena

Kentucky won series 3 – 2

== Division Finals ==
=== Eastern Conference ===
==== Atlantic Division ====
===== (A3) Fredericton Canadiens vs. (A4) Saint John Flames =====
May 5	Fredericton Canadiens	5 – 2	Saint John Flames	Aitken Centre

May 7	Fredericton Canadiens	6 – 4	Saint John Flames	Aitken Centre

May 9	Saint John Flames	3 – 7	Fredericton Canadiens	Harbour Station

May 12	Saint John Flames	2 – 5	Fredericton Canadiens	Harbour Station

Fredericton won series 4 – 0

==== New England Division ====
===== (N1) Providence Bruins vs. (N2) Hartford Wolf Pack =====
May 5	Providence Bruins	5 – 4	2OT	Hartford Wolf Pack	Providence Civic Center

May 7	Providence Bruins	5 – 3	Hartford Wolf Pack	Providence Civic Center

May 8	Hartford Wolf Pack	4 – 5	OT	Providence Bruins	Hartford Civic Center

May 10	Hartford Wolf Pack	1 – 2	Providence Bruins	Hartford Civic Center

Providence won series 4 – 0

=== Western Conference ===
==== Empire Division ====
===== (E1) Rochester Americans vs. (E3) Hamilton Bulldogs =====
May 5	Rochester Americans	3 – 1	Hamilton Bulldogs	Blue Cross Arena at the War Memorial

May 7	Rochester Americans	5 – 2	Hamilton Bulldogs	Blue Cross Arena at the War Memorial

May 8	Hamilton Bulldogs	2 – 1	OT	Rochester Americans	Copps Coliseum

May 11	Hamilton Bulldogs	3 – 2	Rochester Americans	Copps Coliseum

May 14	Rochester Americans	3 – 1	Hamilton Bulldogs	Blue Cross Arena at the War Memorial

May 16	Hamilton Bulldogs	2 – 4	Rochester Americans	Copps Coliseum

Rochester won series 4 – 2

==== Mid-Atlantic Division ====
===== (M1) Philadelphia Phantoms vs. (M2) Kentucky Thoroughblades =====
May 5	Philadelphia Phantoms	3 – 6	Kentucky Thoroughblades	First Union Spectrum

May 7	Philadelphia Phantoms	5 – 2	Kentucky Thoroughblades	First Union Spectrum

May 9	Kentucky Thoroughblades	2 – 1	OT	Philadelphia Phantoms	Rupp Arena

May 11	Kentucky Thoroughblades	3 – 4	OT	Philadelphia Phantoms	Rupp Arena

May 13	Kentucky Thoroughblades	3 – 2	Philadelphia Phantoms	Rupp Arena

May 15	Philadelphia Phantoms	5 – 2	Kentucky Thoroughblades	First Union Spectrum

May 16	Philadelphia Phantoms	9 – 3	Kentucky Thoroughblades	First Union Spectrum

Philadelphia won series 4 – 3

== Conference finals ==
=== Eastern Conference ===
==== (N1) Providence Bruins vs. (A3) Fredericton Canadiens ====
May 19	Providence Bruins	6 – 3	Fredericton Canadiens	Providence Civic Center

May 21	Providence Bruins	6 – 3	Fredericton Canadiens	Providence Civic Center

May 23	Fredericton Canadiens	3 – 5	Providence Bruins	Aitken Centre

May 25	Fredericton Canadiens	4 – 1	Providence Bruins	Aitken Centre

May 27	Fredericton Canadiens	4 – 0	Providence Bruins	Aitken Centre

May 29	Providence Bruins	6 – 1	Fredericton Canadiens	Providence Civic Center

Providence won series 4 – 2

=== Western Conference ===
==== (E1) Rochester Americans vs. (M1) Philadelphia Phantoms ====
May 20	Philadelphia Phantoms	3 – 2	OT	Rochester Americans	First Union Spectrum

May 22	Philadelphia Phantoms	5 – 2	Rochester Americans	First Union Spectrum

May 26	Rochester Americans	3 – 0	Philadelphia Phantoms	Blue Cross Arena at the War Memorial

May 28	Rochester Americans	6 – 1	Philadelphia Phantoms	Blue Cross Arena at the War Memorial

May 30	Rochester Americans	2 – 1	OT	Philadelphia Phantoms	Blue Cross Arena at the War Memorial

June 1	Philadelphia Phantoms	2 – 4	Rochester Americans	First Union Spectrum

Rochester won series 4 – 2

== Calder Cup Final ==
=== (N1) Providence Bruins vs. (E1) Rochester Americans ===
June 5	Providence Bruins	4 – 2	Rochester Americans	Providence Civic Center

June 6	Providence Bruins	6 – 0	Rochester Americans	Providence Civic Center

June 9	Rochester Americans	2 – 3	3OT	Providence Bruins	Blue Cross Arena at the War Memorial

June 11	Rochester Americans	4 – 2	Providence Bruins	Blue Cross Arena at the War Memorial

June 13	Providence Bruins	5 – 1	Rochester Americans	Providence Civic Center

Providence won series 4 – 1

== See also ==
- 1998–99 AHL season
- List of AHL seasons

Preceded by 1998 Calder Cup Playoffs	Calder Cup playoffs 1999	Succeeded by 2000 Calder Cup playoffs
