= 1998 Calder Cup playoffs =

North American ice hockey tournament

Tournament details
- Dates: April 14 – June 10, 1998
- Teams: 16

Final positions
- Champions: Philadelphia Phantoms
- Runners-up: Saint John Flames

The 1998 Calder Cup playoffs of the American Hockey League began on April 14, 1998. The sixteen teams that qualified, eight from each conference, played best-of-five series for division semifinals and best-of-seven series for division finals and conference finals. The conference champions played a best-of-seven series for the Calder Cup. The Calder Cup Final ended on June 10, 1998, with the Philadelphia Phantoms defeating the Saint John Flames four games to two to win the first Calder Cup in team history. Philadelphia's Mike Maneluk won the Jack A. Butterfield Trophy as the AHL playoff MVP.

The Philadelphia Phantoms set an AHL playoff record by winning 9 road games in one playoff year.

== Playoff seeds ==
After the 1997–98 AHL regular season, 16 teams qualified for the playoffs. The top four teams from each division qualified for the playoffs. However, due to the uneven number of teams in the each conference, it was possible for the fifth-placed team in the five team divisions to crossover to the playoffs for the four team divisions. This could only happen if the fifth-placed team in a five team division earned more points than the fourth-placed team in the four team division in the same conference. In this case, the fifth-placed team from the five team division would play in place of the fourth-placed team from the four team division in that part of the playoff bracket. The Philadelphia Phantoms were the Western Conference regular season champions as well as the Macgregor Kilpatrick Trophy winners with the best overall regular season record. The Springfield Falcons were the Eastern Conference regular season champions.

=== Eastern Conference ===
==== Atlantic Division ====
1. Saint John Flames – 99 points
2. Fredericton Canadiens – 81 points
3. Portland Pirates – 80 points
4. St. John's Maple Leafs – 73 points

==== New England Division ====
1. Springfield Falcons – Eastern Conference regular season champions, 99 points
2. Hartford Wolf Pack – 99 points
3. Beast of New Haven – 85 points
4. Worcester IceCats – 83 points

=== Western Conference ===
==== Empire Division ====
1. Albany River Rats – 103 points
2. Hamilton Bulldogs – 94 points
3. Syracuse Crunch – 83 points
4. Adirondack Red Wings – 74 points
5. Rochester Americans – 72 points (Played in the Mid-Atlantic Division bracket by virtue of earning more points than the fourth-placed team in that division)

==== Mid-Atlantic Division ====
1. Philadelphia Phantoms – Western Conference regular season champions; Macgregor Kilpatrick Trophy winners, 106 points
2. Hershey Bears – 85 points
3. Kentucky Thoroughblades – 70 points

== Bracket ==
Division Semifinals	Division Finals
A1	Saint John	3
A4	St. John's	1
A1	Saint John	4
Atlantic Division
A3	Portland	2
A2	Fredericton	1
A3	Portland	3
Eastern Conference
N1	Springfield	1
N4	Worcester	3
N4	Worcester	3
New England Division
N2	Hartford	4
N2	Hartford	3
N3	New Haven	0
E1	Albany	3
E4	Adirondack	0
E1	Albany	4
Empire Division
E3	Hamilton	0
E2	Hamilton	3
E3	Syracuse	2
Western Conference
M1	Philadelphia	3
E5	Rochester	1
M1	Philadelphia	4
Mid-Atlantic Division
M2	Hershey	0
M2	Hershey	3
M3	Kentucky	0

Conference Finals
A1	Saint John	4
N2	Hartford	1
E1	Albany	2
M1	Philadelphia	4

Calder Cup Final
A1	Saint John	2
M1	Philadelphia	4

In each round the team that earned more points during the regular season receives home ice advantage, meaning they receive the "extra" game on home-ice if the series reaches the maximum number of games. There is no set series format due to arena scheduling conflicts and travel considerations.

== Division Semifinals ==
Note 1: All times are in Eastern Time (UTC−4).
Note 2: Game times in italics signify games to be played only if necessary.
Note 3: Home team is listed first.

=== Eastern Conference ===
==== Atlantic Division ====
===== (A1) Saint John Flames vs. (A4) St. John's Maple Leafs =====
April 16	Saint John Flames	4 – 3	St. John's Maple Leafs	Harbour Station

April 18	Saint John Flames	2 – 1	OT	St. John's Maple Leafs	Harbour Station

April 21	St. John's Maple Leafs	3 – 1	Saint John Flames	Memorial Stadium

April 23	St. John's Maple Leafs	1 – 3	Saint John Flames	Memorial Stadium

Saint John won series 3 – 1

===== (A2) Fredericton Canadiens vs. (A3) Portland Pirates =====
April 17	Fredericton Canadiens	3 – 4	Portland Pirates	Aitken Centre

April 19	Fredericton Canadiens	2 – 4	Portland Pirates	Aitken Centre

April 23	Portland Pirates	3 – 6	Fredericton Canadiens	Cumberland County Civic Center

April 24	Portland Pirates	3 – 1	Fredericton Canadiens	Cumberland County Civic Center

Portland won series 3 – 1

==== New England Division ====
===== (N1) Springfield Falcons vs. (N4) Worcester IceCats =====
April 14	Springfield Falcons	3 – 5	Worcester Icecats	Springfield Civic Center

April 19	Worcester Icecats	3 – 2	OT	Springfield Falcons	Worcester's Centrum Centre

April 21	Springfield Falcons	5 – 2	Worcester Icecats	Springfield Civic Center

April 24	Worcester Icecats	5 – 2	Springfield Falcons	Worcester's Centrum Centre

Worcester won series 3 – 1

===== (N2) Hartford Wolf Pack vs. (N3) Beast of New Haven =====
April 17	Hartford Wolf Pack	7 – 4	Beast of New Haven	Hartford Civic Center

April 18	Hartford Wolf Pack	6 – 4	Beast of New Haven	Hartford Civic Center

April 22	Beast of New Haven	2 – 3	Hartford Wolf Pack	New Haven Coliseum

Hartford won series 3 – 0

=== Western Conference ===
==== Empire Division ====
===== (E1) Albany River Rats vs. (E4) Adirondack Red Wings =====
April 17	Albany River Rats	6 – 3	Adirondack Red Wings	Pepsi Arena

April 18	Albany River Rats	2 – 0	Adirondack Red Wings	Pepsi Arena

April 21	Adirondack Red Wings	2 – 3	OT	Albany River Rats	Glens Falls Civic Center

Albany won series 3 – 0

===== (E2) Hamilton Bulldogs vs. (E3) Syracuse Crunch =====
April 17	Hamilton Bulldogs	2 – 5	Syracuse Crunch	Copps Coliseum

April 19	Hamilton Bulldogs	2 – 1	Syracuse Crunch	Copps Coliseum

April 22	Syracuse Crunch	3 – 0	Hamilton Bulldogs	Onondaga War Memorial

April 23	Syracuse Crunch	3 – 4	Hamilton Bulldogs	Onondaga War Memorial

May 25	Hamilton Bulldogs	2 – 1	Syracuse Crunch	Copps Coliseum

Hamilton won series 3 – 2

==== Mid-Atlantic Division ====
===== (M1) Philadelphia Phantoms vs. (E5) Rochester Americans =====
April 14	Philadelphia Phantoms	5 – 2	Rochester Americans	CoreStates Center

April 16	Philadelphia Phantoms	2 – 5	Rochester Americans	CoreStates Center

April 18	Rochester Americans	2 – 5	Philadelphia Phantoms	Rochester Community War Memorial

April 19	Rochester Americans	3 – 6	Philadelphia Phantoms	Rochester Community War Memorial

Philadelphia won series 3 – 1

===== (M2) Hershey Bears vs. (M3) Kentucky Thoroughblades =====
April 15	Hershey Bears	2 – 1	Kentucky Thoroughblades	Hersheypark Arena

April 17	Hershey Bears	2 – 1	Kentucky Thoroughblades	Hersheypark Arena

April 22	Kentucky Thoroughblades	3 – 10	Hershey Bears	Rupp Arena

Hershey won series 3 – 0

== Division Finals ==
=== Eastern Conference ===
==== Atlantic Division ====
===== (A1) Saint John Flames vs. (A3) Portland Pirates =====
April 28	Saint John Flames	7 – 1	Portland Pirates	Harbour Station

April 30	Saint John Flames	5 – 4	OT	Portland Pirates	Harbour Station

May 3	Portland Pirates	3 – 1	Saint John Flames	Cumberland County Civic Center

May 5	Portland Pirates	4 – 5	Saint John Flames	Cumberland County Civic Center

May 7	Saint John Flames	1 – 3	Portland Pirates	Harbour Station

May 9	Portland Pirates	1 – 2	Saint John Flames	Cumberland County Civic Center

Saint John won series 4 – 2

==== New England Division ====
===== (N2) Hartford Wolf Pack vs. (N4) Worcester IceCats =====
April 29	Hartford Wolf Pack	5 – 2	Worcester Ice Cats	Hartford Civic Center

May 1	Hartford Wolf Pack	5 – 1	Worcester Ice Cats	Hartford Civic Center

May 2	Worcester Ice Cats	6 – 3	Hartford Wolf Pack	Worcester's Centrum Centre

May 5	Worcester Ice Cats	7 – 1	Hartford Wolf Pack	Worcester's Centrum Centre

May 10	Hartford Wolf Pack	1 – 4	Worcester Ice Cats	Hartford Civic Center

May 12	Worcester Ice Cats	1 – 4	Hartford Wolf Pack	Worcester's Centrum Centre

May 13	Hartford Wolf Pack	8 – 2	Worcester Ice Cats	Hartford Civic Center

Hartford won series 4 – 3

=== Western Conference ===
==== Empire Division ====
===== (E1) Albany River Rats vs. (E2) Hamilton Bulldogs =====
May 1	Albany River Rats	6 – 5	OT	Hamilton Bulldogs	Pepsi Arena

May 3	Albany River Rats	3 – 1	Hamilton Bulldogs	Pepsi Arena

May 6	Hamilton Bulldogs	5 – 6	OT	Albany River Rats	Copps Coliseum

May 8	Hamilton Bulldogs	2 – 6	Albany River Rats	Copps Coliseum

Albany won series 4 – 0

==== Mid-Atlantic Division ====
===== (M1) Philadelphia Phantoms vs. (M2) Hershey Bears =====
April 26	Philadelphia Phantoms	3 – 2	Hershey Bears	CoreStates Center

April 29	Philadelphia Phantoms	5 – 3	Hershey Bears	CoreStates Center

May 2	Hershey Bears	2 – 4	Philadelphia Phantoms	Hersheypark Arena

May 3	Hershey Bears	0 – 3	Philadelphia Phantoms	Hersheypark Arena

Philadelphia won series 4 – 0

== Conference finals ==
=== Eastern Conference ===
==== (N2) Hartford Wolf Pack vs. (A1) Saint John Flames ====
May 16	Saint John Flames	5 – 4	Hartford Wolf Pack	Harbour Station

May 18	Saint John Flames	1 – 6	Hartford Wolf Pack	Harbour Station

May 20	Hartford Wolf Pack	2 – 5	Saint John Flames	Hartford Civic Center

May 22	Hartford Wolf Pack	3 – 4	Saint John Flames	Hartford Civic Center

May 24	Hartford Wolf Pack	3 – 7	Saint John Flames	Hartford Civic Center

Saint John won series 4 – 1

=== Western Conference ===
==== (M1) Philadelphia Phantoms vs. (E1) Albany River Rats ====
May 15	Philadelphia Phantoms	4 – 2	Albany River Rats	CoreStates Spectrum

May 17	Philadelphia Phantoms	1 – 2	Albany River Rats	CoreStates Spectrum

May 20	Albany River Rats	0 – 2	Philadelphia Phantoms	Pepsi Arena

May 22	Albany River Rats	3 – 7	Philadelphia Phantoms	Pepsi Arena

May 23	Philadelphia Phantoms	3 – 4	Albany River Rats	CoreStates Spectrum

May 25	Albany River Rats	0 – 3	Philadelphia Phantoms	Pepsi Arena

Philadelphia won series 4 – 2

== Calder Cup Final ==
=== (M1) Philadelphia Phantoms vs. (A1) Saint John Flames ===
May 30	Philadelphia Phantoms	3 – 2	2OT	Saint John Flames	CoreStates Spectrum

May 31	Philadelphia Phantoms	2 – 3	OT	Saint John Flames	CoreStates Spectrum

June 3	Saint John Flames	3 – 4	OT	Philadelphia Phantoms	Harbour Station

June 5	Saint John Flames	4 – 6	Philadelphia Phantoms	Harbour Station

June 7	Saint John Flames	6 – 1	Philadelphia Phantoms	Harbour Station

June 10	Philadelphia Phantoms	6 – 1	Saint John Flames	CoreStates Spectrum

Philadelphia won series 4 – 2

== See also ==
- 1997–98 AHL season
- List of AHL seasons

Preceded by 1997 Calder Cup playoffs	Calder Cup playoffs 1998	Succeeded by 1999 Calder Cup playoffs
