= 1997 Calder Cup playoffs =

North American ice hockey tournament

Tournament details
- Dates: April 18 – June 13, 1997
- Teams: 16

Final positions
- Champions: Hershey Bears
- Runners-up: Hamilton Bulldogs

The 1997 Calder Cup playoffs of the American Hockey League began on April 18, 1997. The sixteen teams that qualified, eight from each conference, played best-of-five series for division semifinals and best-of-seven series for division finals and conference finals. The conference champions played a best-of-seven series for the Calder Cup. The Calder Cup Final ended on June 13, 1997, with the Hershey Bears defeating the Hamilton Bulldogs four games to one to win the eighth Calder Cup in team history. Hershey's Mike McHugh won the Jack A. Butterfield Trophy as AHL playoff MVP.

Hershey set an AHL playoff record by scoring 35 powerplay goals during the 1997 Calder Cup playoffs. Furthermore, Game 2 of the Mid-Atlantic Division final between Hershey and Philadelphia set an AHL playoff record for the most penalty minutes in one game by both teams with 350 (Hershey, 179; Philadelphia, 171). In addition, Hershey's Jean-François Labbé set an AHL playoff record for goaltenders by playing in 23 games in one playoff.

== Playoff seeds ==
After the 1996–97 AHL regular season, 16 teams qualified for the playoffs. The top four teams from each division qualified for the playoffs. However, due to the uneven number of teams in the each conference, it was possible for the fifth-placed team in the five team divisions to crossover to the playoffs for the four team divisions. This could only happen if the fifth-placed team in a five team division earned more points than the fourth-placed team in the four team division in the same conference. In this case, the fifth-placed team from the five team division would play in place of the fourth-placed team from the four team division in that part of the playoff bracket. The Philadelphia Phantoms were the Southern Conference regular season champions and also had the best overall regular season record. The Rochester Americans were the Northern Conference regular season champions.

=== Northern Conference ===
==== Canadian Division ====
1. St. John's Maple Leafs – 88 points
2. Saint John Flames – 72 points
3. Hamilton Bulldogs – 69 points

==== Empire State Division ====
1. Rochester Americans – Northern Conference regular season champions, 90 points
2. Adirondack Red Wings – 90 points
3. Albany River Rats – 90 points
4. Syracuse Crunch – 74 points
5. Binghamton Rangers – 69 points (Played in the Canadian Division bracket by virtue of earning more points than the fourth-placed team in that division)

=== Southern Conference ===
==== New England Division ====
1. Worcester IceCats – 100 points
2. Springfield Falcons – 96 points
3. Portland Pirates – 91 points
4. Providence Bruins – 75 points

==== Mid-Atlantic Division ====
1. Philadelphia Phantoms – Southern Conference regular season champions; Best overall regular season record, 111 points
2. Hershey Bears – 101 points
3. Kentucky Thoroughblades – 81 points
4. Baltimore Bandits – 73 points

== Bracket ==
Division Semifinals	Division Finals
C1	St. John's	3
E5	Binghamton	1
C1	St. John's	3
Canadian Division
C3	Hamilton	4
C2	Saint John	2
C3	Hamilton	3
Northern Conference
E1	Rochester	3
E4	Syracuse	0
E1	Rochester	3
Empire State Division
E3	Albany	4
E2	Adirondack	1
E3	Albany	3
N1	Worcester	2
N4	Providence	3
N4	Providence	1
New England Division
N2	Springfield	4
N2	Springfield	3
N3	Portland	2
Southern Conference
M1	Philadelphia	3
M4	Baltimore	0
M1	Philadelphia	3
Mid-Atlantic Division
M2	Hershey	4
M2	Hershey	3
M3	Kentucky	1

Conference Finals
C3	Hamilton	4
E3	Albany	1
N2	Springfield	3
M2	Hershey	4

Calder Cup Final
C3	Hamilton	1
M2	Hershey	4

In each round the team that earned more points during the regular season receives home ice advantage, meaning they receive the "extra" game on home-ice if the series reaches the maximum number of games. There is no set series format due to arena scheduling conflicts and travel considerations.

== Division Semifinals ==
Note 1: All times are in Eastern Time (UTC−4).
Note 2: Game times in italics signify games to be played only if necessary.
Note 3: Home team is listed first.

=== Northern Conference ===
==== Canadian Division ====
===== (C1) St. John's Maple Leafs vs. (E5) Binghamton Rangers =====
April 18	St. John's Maple Leafs	5 – 2	Binghamton Rangers	Memorial Stadium

April 20	St. John's Maple Leafs	2 – 3	Binghamton Rangers	Memorial Stadium

April 23	Binghamton Rangers	2 – 3	St. John's Maple Leafs	Broome County Veterans Memorial Arena

April 25	Binghamton Rangers	2 – 4	St. John's Maple Leafs	Broome County Veterans Memorial Arena

St. John's won series 3 – 1

===== (C2) Saint John Flames vs. (C3) Hamilton Bulldogs =====
April 18	Saint John Flames	4 – 5	Hamilton Bulldogs	Harbour Station

April 20	Saint John Flames	3 – 2	Hamilton Bulldogs	Harbour Station

April 23	Hamilton Bulldogs	2 – 1	Saint John Flames	Copps Coliseum

April 25	Hamilton Bulldogs	4 – 5	OT	Saint John Flames	Copps Coliseum

April 28	Saint John Flames	1 – 3	Hamilton Bulldogs	Harbour Station

Hamilton won series 3 – 2

==== Empire State Division ====
===== (E1) Rochester Americans vs. (E4) Syracuse Crunch =====
April 18	Rochester Americans	7 – 4	Syracuse Crunch	Rochester Community War Memorial

April 19	Rochester Americans	6 – 2	Syracuse Crunch	Rochester Community War Memorial

April 23	Syracuse Crunch	2 – 3	Rochester Americans	Onondaga War Memorial

Rochester won series 3 – 0

===== (E2) Adirondack Red Wings vs. (E3) Albany River Rats =====
April 19	Albany River Rats	2 – 0	Adirondack Red Wings	Pepsi Arena

April 20	Albany River Rats	2 – 3	Adirondack Red Wings	Pepsi Arena

April 22	Adirondack Red Wings	7 – 3	Albany River Rats	Glens Falls Civic Center

April 24	Adirondack Red Wings	4 – 1	Albany River Rats	Glens Falls Civic Center

Albany won series 3 – 1

=== Southern Conference ===
==== New England Division ====
===== (N1) Worcester IceCats vs. (N4) Providence Bruins =====
April 18	Worcester IceCats	5 – 4	Providence Bruins	Worcester Centrum

April 19	Providence Bruins	4 – 5	Worcester IceCats	Providence Civic Center

April 23	Worcester IceCats	2 – 4	Providence Bruins	Worcester Centrum

April 24	Providence Bruins	5 – 4	2OT	Worcester IceCats	Providence Civic Center

April 26	Worcester IceCats	2 – 3	Providence Bruins	Worcester Centrum

Providence won series 3 – 2

===== (N2) Springfield Falcons vs. (N3) Portland Pirates =====
April 18	Springfield Falcons	3 – 4	Portland Pirates	Springfield Civic Center

April 19	Portland Pirates	5 – 2	Springfield Falcons	Cumberland County Civic Center

April 23	Springfield Falcons	3 – 2	OT	Portland Pirates	Springfield Civic Center

April 26	Portland Pirates	3 – 4	Springfield Falcons	Cumberland County Civic Center

April 27	Springfield Falcons	1 – 0	OT	Portland Pirates	Springfield Civic Center

Springfield won series 3 – 2

==== Mid-Atlantic Division ====
===== (M1) Philadelphia Phantoms vs. (M4) Baltimore Bandits =====
April 19	Philadelphia Phantoms	4 – 2	Baltimore Bandits	CoreStates Center

April 20	Philadelphia Phantoms	7 – 1	Baltimore Bandits	CoreStates Center

April 23	Baltimore Bandits	2 – 4	Philadelphia Phantoms	Baltimore Arena

Philadelphia won series 3 – 0

===== (M2) Hershey Bears vs. (M3) Kentucky Thoroughblades =====
April 18	Hershey Bears	4 – 3	2OT	Kentucky Thoroughblades	Hersheypark Arena

April 21	Hershey Bears	3 – 0	Kentucky Thoroughblades	Hersheypark Arena

April 23	Kentucky Thoroughblades	4 – 2	Hershey Bears	Rupp Arena

April 25	Kentucky Thoroughblades	2 – 5	Hershey Bears	Rupp Arena

Hershey won series 3 – 1

== Division Finals ==
=== Northern Conference ===
==== Canadian Division ====
===== (C1) St. John's Maple Leafs vs. (C3) Hamilton Bulldogs =====
May 1	Hamilton Bulldogs	3 – 2	St. John's Maple Leafs	Copps Coliseum

May 3	Hamilton Bulldogs	2 – 4	St. John's Maple Leafs	Copps Coliseum

May 5	St. John's Maple Leafs	3 – 1	Hamilton Bulldogs	Memorial Stadium

May 7	St. John's Maple Leafs	3 – 4	Hamilton Bulldogs	Memorial Stadium

May 9	St. John's Maple Leafs	5 – 2	Hamilton Bulldogs	Memorial Stadium

May 11	Hamilton Bulldogs	4 – 3	OT	St. John's Maple Leafs	Copps Coliseum

May 13	St. John's Maple Leafs	0 – 3	Hamilton Bulldogs	Memorial Stadium

Hamilton won series 4 – 3

==== Empire State Division ====
===== (E1) Rochester Americans vs. (E3) Albany River Rats =====
April 30	Rochester Americans	2 – 3	OT	Albany River Rats	Rochester Community War Memorial

May 2	Rochester Americans	3 – 5	Albany River Rats	Rochester Community War Memorial

May 4	Albany River Rats	2 – 5	Rochester Americans	Pepsi Arena

May 7	Albany River Rats	3 – 2	OT	Rochester Americans	Pepsi Arena

May 9	Rochester Americans	4 – 2	Albany River Rats	Rochester Community War Memorial

May 11	Albany River Rats	2 – 6	Rochester Americans	Pepsi Arena

May 14	Rochester Americans	2 – 6	Albany River Rats	Rochester Community War Memorial

Albany won series 4 – 3

=== Southern Conference ===
==== New England Division ====
===== (N2) Springfield Falcons vs. (N4) Providence Bruins =====
May 2	Springfield Falcons	4 – 1	Providence Bruins	Springfield Civic Center

May 3	Springfield Falcons	2 – 0	Providence Bruins	Springfield Civic Center

May 6	Providence Bruins	3 – 4	OT	Springfield Falcons	Providence Civic Center

May 9	Providence Bruins	2 – 1	Springfield Falcons	Providence Civic Center

May 10	Springfield Falcons	3 – 1	Providence Bruins	Springfield Civic Center

Springfield won series 4 – 1

==== Mid-Atlantic Division ====
===== (M1) Philadelphia Phantoms vs. (M2) Hershey Bears =====
May 1	Philadelphia Phantoms	3 – 5	Hershey Bears	CoreStates Spectrum

May 3	Philadelphia Phantoms	7 – 4	Hershey Bears	CoreStates Spectrum

May 4	Hershey Bears	4 – 2	Philadelphia Phantoms	Hersheypark Arena

May 7	Hershey Bears	2 – 3	OT	Philadelphia Phantoms	Hersheypark Arena

May 10	Philadelphia Phantoms	3 – 0	Hershey Bears	CoreStates Spectrum

May 11	Hershey Bears	3 – 2	3OT	Philadelphia Phantoms	Hersheypark Arena

May 14	Philadelphia Phantoms	2 – 3	Hershey Bears	CoreStates Spectrum

Hershey won series 4 – 3

== Conference finals ==
=== Northern Conference ===
==== (E3) Albany River Rats vs. (C3) Hamilton Bulldogs ====
May 17	Albany River Rats	1 – 2	OT	Hamilton Bulldogs	Pepsi Arena

May 20	Albany River Rats	3 – 4	Hamilton Bulldogs	Pepsi Arena

May 23	Hamilton Bulldogs	2 – 0	Albany River Rats	Copps Coliseum

May 25	Hamilton Bulldogs	3 – 5	Albany River Rats	Copps Coliseum

May 27	Hamilton Bulldogs	7 – 3	Albany River Rats	Copps Coliseum

Hamilton won series 4 – 1

=== Southern Conference ===
==== (M2) Hershey Bears vs. (N2) Springfield Falcons ====
May 18	Hershey Bears	2 – 6	Springfield Falcons	Hersheypark Arena

May 19	Hershey Bears	3 – 5	Springfield Falcons	Hersheypark Arena

May 21	Springfield Falcons	3 – 4	OT	Hershey Bears	Springfield Civic Center

May 23	Springfield Falcons	4 – 3	Hershey Bears	Springfield Civic Center

May 24	Springfield Falcons	1 – 4	Hershey Bears	Springfield Civic Center

May 29	Hershey Bears	4 – 1	Springfield Falcons	Hersheypark Arena

May 31	Hershey Bears	3 – 1	Springfield Falcons	Hersheypark Arena

Hershey won series 4 – 3

== Calder Cup Final ==
=== (M2) Hershey Bears vs. (C3) Hamilton Bulldogs ===
June 4	Hershey Bears	4 – 2	Hamilton Bulldogs	Hersheypark Arena

June 7	Hershey Bears	6 – 5	OT	Hamilton Bulldogs	Hersheypark Arena

June 9	Hamilton Bulldogs	2 – 1	Hershey Bears	Copps Coliseum

June 11	Hamilton Bulldogs	2 – 4	Hershey Bears	Copps Coliseum

June 13	Hamilton Bulldogs	1 – 4	Hershey Bears	Copps Coliseum

Hershey won series 4 – 1

== See also ==
- 1996–97 AHL season
- List of AHL seasons

Preceded by 1996 Calder Cup playoffs	Calder Cup playoffs 1997	Succeeded by 1998 Calder Cup playoffs
