= 2001 Calder Cup playoffs =

North American ice hockey tournament

Tournament details
- Dates: April 10 – May 28, 2001
- Teams: 16

Final positions
- Champions: Saint John Flames
- Runners-up: Wilkes-Barre/Scranton Penguins

The 2001 Calder Cup playoffs of the American Hockey League began on April 10, 2001. The sixteen teams that qualified, eight from each conference, played best-of-five series for division semifinals and best-of-seven series for division finals and conference finals. The conference champions played a best-of-seven series for the Calder Cup. The Calder Cup Final ended on May 28, 2001, with the Saint John Flames defeating the Wilkes-Barre/Scranton Penguins four games to two to win the first, and only, Calder Cup in team history.

Saint John's Steve Begin won the Jack A. Butterfield Trophy as AHL playoff MVP. Wilkes-Barre Scranton defenseman Chris Kelleher set an AHL playoff record for points scored by a defenseman in one playoff with 25 (7 goals, 18 assists). This record was broken in 2008 by Wilkes-Barre/Scranton defenseman Alex Goligoski.

== Playoff seeds ==
After the 2000–01 AHL regular season, 16 teams qualified for the playoffs. The top four teams from each division qualified for the playoffs. However, due to the uneven number of teams in each division, it was possible for teams to crossover to another division for the playoffs. The fifth-placed team in the New England Division could qualify for the fourth playoff spot in the Canadian Division if they earned more points than the fourth-placed team in the Canadian Division. The fifth-placed team in the Mid-Atlantic Division could qualify for the fourth playoff spot in the South Division if they earned more points than the fourth-placed team in the South Division. The Worcester IceCats were the Eastern Conference regular season champions as well as the Macgregor Kilpatrick Trophy winners with the best overall regular season record. The Rochester Americans were the Western Conference regular season champions.

=== Eastern Conference ===
==== Canadian Division ====
1. Saint John Flames – 100 points
2. Quebec Citadelles – 89 points
3. St. John's Maple Leafs – 80 points

==== New England Division ====
1. Worcester IceCats – Eastern Conference regular season champions; Macgregor Kilpatrick Trophy winners, 108 points
2. Hartford Wolf Pack – 94 points
3. Providence Bruins – 84 points
4. Lowell Lock Monsters – 80 points
5. Portland Pirates – 74 points (Played in the Canadian Division bracket by virtue of earning more points than the fourth-placed team in that division)

=== Western Conference ===
==== Mid-Atlantic Division ====
1. Rochester Americans – Western Conference regular season champions, 104 points
2. Syracuse Crunch – 83 points
3. Wilkes-Barre/Scranton Penguins – 83 points
4. Philadelphia Phantoms – 82 points
5. Hershey Bears – 75 points (Played in the South Division bracket by virtue of earning more points than the fourth-placed team in that division)

==== Southern Division ====
1. Kentucky Thoroughblades – 97 points
2. Cincinnati Mighty Ducks – 95 points
3. Norfolk Admirals – 90 points

== Bracket ==
Division Semifinals	Division Finals
C1	Saint John	3
N5	Portland	0
C1	Saint John	4
Canadian Division
C2	Quebec	1
C2	Quebec	3
C3	St. John's	1
Eastern Conference
N1	Worcester	3
N4	Lowell	1
N1	Worcester	3
New England Division
N3	Providence	4
N2	Hartford	2
N3	Providence	3
M1	Rochester	1
M4	Philadelphia	3
M4	Philadelphia	2
Mid-Atlantic Division
M2	Wilkes-Barre/Scranton	4
M2	Wilkes-Barre/Scranton	3
M3	Syracuse	2
Western Conference
S1	Kentucky	0
M5	Hershey	3
M5	Hershey	4
Southern Division
S3	Norfolk	1
S2	Cincinnati	1
S3	Norfolk	3

Conference Finals
C1	Saint John	4
N3	Providence	1
M2	Wilkes-Barre/Scranton	4
M5	Hershey	0

Calder Cup Final
C1	Saint John	4
M2	Wilkes-Barre/Scranton	2

In each round the team that earned more points during the regular season receives home ice advantage, meaning they receive the "extra" game on home-ice if the series reaches the maximum number of games. There is no set series format due to arena scheduling conflicts and travel considerations.

== Division Semifinals ==
Note 1: All times are in Eastern Time (UTC−4).
Note 2: Game times in italics signify games to be played only if necessary.
Note 3: Home team is listed first.

=== Eastern Conference ===
==== Canadian Division ====
===== (C1) Saint John Flames vs. (N5) Portland Pirates =====
April 12	Saint John Flames	3 – 0	Portland Pirates	Harbour Station

April 13	Saint John Flames	4 – 3	Portland Pirates	Harbour Station

April 15	Portland Pirates	2 – 3	3OT	Saint John Flames	Cumberland County Civic Center

Saint John won series 3 – 0

===== (C2) Quebec Citadelles vs. (C3) St. John's Maple Leafs =====
April 11	Quebec Citadelles	5 – 1	St. John's Maple Leafs	Colisée Pepsi

April 13	Quebec Citadelles	4 – 3	St. John's Maple Leafs	Colisée Pepsi

April 15	St. John's Maple Leafs	3 – 2	OT	Quebec Citadelles	Memorial Stadium

April 16	St. John's Maple Leafs	0 – 4	Quebec Citadelles	Memorial Stadium

Quebec won series 3 – 1

==== New England Division ====
===== (N1) Worcester IceCats vs. (N4) Lowell Lock Monsters =====
April 11	Worcester IceCats	4 – 3	OT	Lowell Lock Monsters	Worcester's Centrum Centre

April 13	Worcester IceCats	4 – 3	Lowell Lock Monsters	Worcester's Centrum Centre

April 15	Lowell Lock Monsters	4 – 0	Worcester IceCats	Tsongas Arena

April 17	Lowell Lock Monsters	2 – 3	OT	Worcester IceCats	Tsongas Arena

Worcester won series 3 – 1

===== (N2) Hartford Wolf Pack vs. (N3) Providence Bruins =====
April 11	Hartford Wolf Pack	3 – 1	Providence Bruins	Hartford Civic Center

April 13	Hartford Wolf Pack	2 – 1	Providence Bruins	Hartford Civic Center

April 14	Providence Bruins	5 – 4	OT	Hartford Wolf Pack	Providence Civic Center

April 16	Providence Bruins	4 – 3	Hartford Wolf Pack	Providence Civic Center

April 18	Hartford Wolf Pack	1 – 2	Providence Bruins	Hartford Civic Center

Providence won series 3 – 2

=== Western Conference ===
==== Mid-Atlantic Division ====
===== (M1) Rochester Americans vs. (M4) Philadelphia Phantoms =====
April 11	Rochester Americans	4 – 3	OT	Philadelphia Phantoms	Blue Cross Arena at the War Memorial

April 13	Philadelphia Phantoms	2 – 1	OT	Rochester Americans	First Union Spectrum

April 14	Rochester Americans	0 – 2	Philadelphia Phantoms	Blue Cross Arena at the War Memorial

April 16	Philadelphia Phantoms	4 – 2	Rochester Americans	First Union Spectrum

Philadelphia won series 3 – 1

===== (M2) Wilkes-Barre/Scranton Penguins vs. (M3) Syracuse Crunch =====
April 11	Wilkes-Barre/Scranton Penguins	1 – 2	OT	Syracuse Crunch	First Union Arena at Casey Plaza

April 13	Wilkes-Barre/Scranton Penguins	5 – 2	Syracuse Crunch	First Union Arena at Casey Plaza

April 14	Syracuse Crunch	4 – 5	OT	Wilkes-Barre/Scranton Penguins	War Memorial at Oncenter

April 16	Syracuse Crunch	3 – 2	Wilkes-Barre/Scranton Penguins	War Memorial at Oncenter

April 18	Wilkes-Barre/Scranton Penguins	6 – 2	Syracuse Crunch	First Union Arena at Casey Plaza

Wilkes-Barre/Scranton won series 3 – 2

==== Southern Division ====
===== (S1) Kentucky Thoroughblades vs. (M5) Hershey Bears =====
April 10	Kentucky Thoroughblades	2 – 3	OT	Hershey Bears	Rupp Arena

April 12	Kentucky Thoroughblades	2 – 3	OT	Hershey Bears	Rupp Arena

April 14	Hershey Bears	2 – 1	Kentucky Thoroughblades	Hersheypark Arena

Hershey won series 3 – 0

===== (S2) Cincinnati Mighty Ducks vs. (S3) Norfolk Admirals =====
April 11	Cincinnati Mighty Ducks	4 – 5^{1}	OT	Norfolk Admirals

April 13	Cincinnati Mighty Ducks	3 – 6^{2}	Norfolk Admirals

April 14	Norfolk Admirals	3 – 4	Cincinnati Mighty Ducks	Norfolk Scope

April 15	Norfolk Admirals	4 – 3	OT	Cincinnati Mighty Ducks	Norfolk Scope

Norfolk won series 3 – 1

^{1} – at Cincinnati Gardens
^{2} – at Norfolk, Virginia

== Division Finals ==
=== Eastern Conference ===
==== Canadian Division ====
===== (C1) Saint John Flames vs. (C2) Quebec Citadelles =====
April 19	Saint John Flames	4 – 0	Quebec Citadelles	Harbour Station

April 23	Saint John Flames	5 – 2	Quebec Citadelles	Harbour Station

April 25	Quebec Citadelles	3 – 2	Saint John Flames	Colisée Pepsi

April 27	Quebec Citadelles	4 – 5	OT	Saint John Flames	Colisée Pepsi

April 29	Quebec Citadelles	1 – 3	Saint John Flames	Colisée Pepsi

Saint John won series 4 – 1

==== New England Division ====
===== (N1) Worcester IceCats vs. (N3) Providence Bruins =====
April 21	Worcester IceCats	0 – 2	Providence Bruins	Worcester's Centrum Centre

April 22	Worcester IceCats	3 – 4	Providence Bruins	Worcester's Centrum Centre

April 24	Providence Bruins	0 – 5	Worcester IceCats	Providence Civic Center

April 27	Providence Bruins	2 – 4	Worcester IceCats	Providence Civic Center

April 28	Worcester IceCats	3 – 1	Providence Bruins	Worcester's Centrum Centre

April 30	Providence Bruins	1 – 0	Worcester IceCats	Providence Civic Center

May 1	Worcester IceCats	2 – 3	OT	Providence Bruins	Worcester's Centrum Centre

Providence won series 4 – 3

=== Western Conference ===
==== Mid-Atlantic Division ====
===== (M2) Wilkes-Barre/Scranton Penguins vs. (M4) Philadelphia Phantoms =====
April 21	Wilkes-Barre/Scranton Penguins	4 – 3	Philadelphia Phantoms	First Union Arena at Casey Plaza

April 23	Wilkes-Barre/Scranton Penguins	4 – 2	Philadelphia Phantoms	First Union Arena at Casey Plaza

April 25	Philadelphia Phantoms	0 – 3	Wilkes-Barre/Scranton Penguins	First Union Center

April 27	Philadelphia Phantoms	8 – 2	Wilkes-Barre/Scranton Penguins	First Union Center

April 28	Wilkes-Barre/Scranton Penguins	2 – 3	OT	Philadelphia Phantoms	First Union Arena at Casey Plaza

May 1	Philadelphia Phantoms	2 – 3	OT	Wilkes-Barre/Scranton Penguins	First Union Center

Wilkes-Barre/Scranton won series 4 – 2

==== Southern Division ====
===== (S3) Norfolk Admirals vs. (M5) Hershey Bears =====
April 20	Norfolk Admirals	4 – 2	Hershey Bears	at Richmond, Virginia

April 21	Norfolk Admirals	1 – 3	Hershey Bears	at Richmond, Virginia

April 25	Hershey Bears	2 – 1	OT	Norfolk Admirals	Hersheypark Arena

April 27	Hershey Bears	3 – 1	Norfolk Admirals	Hersheypark Arena

April 29	Norfolk Admirals	0 – 2	Hershey Bears	at Richmond, Virginia

Hershey won series 4 – 1

== Conference finals ==
=== Eastern Conference ===
==== (C1) Saint John Flames vs. (N3) Providence Bruins ====
May 4	Saint John Flames	2 – 0	Providence Bruins	Harbour Station

May 6	Saint John Flames	5 – 1	Providence Bruins	Harbour Station

May 9	Providence Bruins	2 – 5	Saint John Flames	Providence Civic Center

May 11	Providence Bruins	4 – 1	Saint John Flames	Providence Civic Center

May 12	Providence Bruins	2 – 3	Saint John Flames	Providence Civic Center

Saint John won series 4 – 1

=== Western Conference ===
==== (M2) Wilkes-Barre/Scranton Penguins vs. (M5) Hershey Bears ====
May 5	Wilkes-Barre/Scranton Penguins	2 – 1	OT	Hershey Bears	First Union Arena at Casey Plaza

May 7	Wilkes-Barre/Scranton Penguins	2 – 1	2OT	Hershey Bears	First Union Arena at Casey Plaza

May 9	Hershey Bears	4 – 5	OT	Wilkes-Barre/Scranton Penguins	Hersheypark Arena

May 12	Hershey Bears	1 – 3	Wilkes-Barre/Scranton Penguins	Hersheypark Arena

Wilkes-Barre/Scranton won series 4 – 0

== Calder Cup Final ==
=== (C1) Saint John Flames vs. (M2) Wilkes-Barre/Scranton Penguins ===
May 17	Saint John Flames	3 – 4	Wilkes-Barre/Scranton Penguins	Harbour Station

May 19	Saint John Flames	4 – 3	Wilkes-Barre/Scranton Penguins	Harbour Station

May 21	Wilkes-Barre/Scranton Penguins	1 – 4	Saint John Flames	First Union Arena at Casey Plaza

May 23	Wilkes-Barre/Scranton Penguins	6 – 4	Saint John Flames	First Union Arena at Casey Plaza

May 25	Wilkes-Barre/Scranton Penguins	3 – 4	Saint John Flames	First Union Arena at Casey Plaza

May 28	Saint John Flames	1 – 0	Wilkes-Barre/Scranton Penguins	Harbour Station

Saint John won series 4 – 2

== See also ==
- 2000–01 AHL season
- List of AHL seasons

Preceded by 2000 Calder Cup playoffs	Calder Cup playoffs 2001	Succeeded by 2002 Calder Cup playoffs
