= Hamilton Bulldogs (AHL) =

American Hockey League team (1996–2015)

- City: Hamilton, Ontario
- League: American Hockey League
- Conference: Western Conference
- Division: North Division
- Founded: 1984 (first franchise); 1996 (second franchise)
- Operated: 1996–2015
- Home arena: FirstOntario Centre
- Colours: Blue, red, copper, tan, white
- Media: The Hamilton Spectator; AM900 CHML; TVA Sports
- Affiliates: Edmonton Oilers (NHL); Montreal Canadiens (NHL)

Franchise history
- First franchise
- 1984–1988 1988–1996: Nova Scotia Oilers; Cape Breton Oilers
- 1996–2003 2003–2004: Hamilton Bulldogs; Toronto Roadrunners
- 2004–2005 2010–2015: Edmonton Road Runners; Oklahoma City Barons
- 2015–present: Bakersfield Condors
- Second franchise
- 1969–1971 1971–1984: Montreal Voyageurs; Nova Scotia Voyageurs
- 1984–1990 1990–1999: Sherbrooke Canadiens; Fredericton Canadiens
- 1999–2002 2002–2015: Quebec Citadelles; Hamilton Bulldogs
- 2015–2017: St. John's IceCaps
- 2017–present: Laval Rocket

Championships
- Regular season titles: 1 (2002–03)
- Division titles: 4 (2002–03, 2003–04, 2009–10, 2010–11)
- Conference titles: 3 (1996–97, 2002–03, 2006–07)
- Calder Cups: 1 (2006–07)

The Hamilton Bulldogs were a professional ice hockey team in the American Hockey League. They played in Hamilton, Ontario, at FirstOntario Centre. They were the AHL affiliate of the NHL's Edmonton Oilers and Montreal Canadiens as two separate franchises over 19 seasons of continuous participation in the AHL. The team won the Calder Cup once in its history, in 2007.

== History ==
=== 1996–2002: Edmonton Oilers AHL franchise ===
The Hamilton Bulldogs Hockey Club was first established in 1996 following the relocation of the Cape Breton Oilers to Hamilton, Ontario. The team was nicknamed the "Bulldogs" as it was determined to best suit the city. The name "Hamilton Havoc" was runner-up.

On the ice, the club reached the Calder Cup Finals three times. Firstly in 1997, the club's first year, and again in 2003 only to lose in both cases. The 2003 game 7 final was played June 12, 2003, vs the Houston Aeros. The attendance at Copps Coliseum was 17,428, making it the largest playoff crowd in the history of the AHL (the record was later broken in 2005 in Philadelphia). Houston won the game 3–0 and the series 4–3. The Bulldogs finally won the Calder Cup Final in 2007 against the Hershey Bears. This series was a rematch of the 1997 Calder Cup Final which Hershey won 4 games to 1. The Bulldogs reversed that in 2007 – Hamilton 4 games to Hershey's 1.

Off the ice, the club faced turmoil in 2000 resulting in a "Stay Dogs Stay" campaign spearheaded by Don Robertson, Ron Burnstein, Nick Javor, and club president Cary Kaplan, aimed at keeping the franchise in Hamilton. The campaign was a financial success and resulted in the club remaining in the city with a bolstered fan base and an improved lease.

=== 2002–2015: Montreal Canadiens affiliation, and keeping the Bulldogs in Hamilton ===
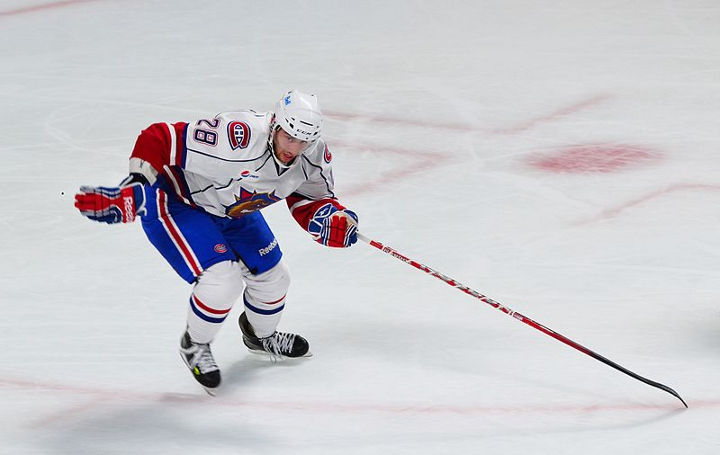
Aaron Palushaj wearing the Bulldogs uniform during a game played at the Bell Centre in Montreal

In spite of a franchise high in attendance in 2001, the Edmonton Oilers announced plans to move their AHL franchise to Toronto. The same "Stay Dogs Stay" committee went back to work for the second consecutive year, and secured local interests who made a multimillion-dollar investment to secure ownership of the Quebec Citadelles franchise from the Montreal Canadiens and merged them with Hamilton, thus keeping the Bulldogs in town. The achievement to preserve the team was a unique joint venture between the Montreal Canadiens, the Edmonton Oilers, the American Hockey League, and a local consortium of Hamilton owners, which allowed for a joint affiliation in 2002–03 between Montreal and Edmonton as ownership changed hands. After the 2002–03 season, the Oilers officially relocated their franchise to Toronto and became the Toronto Roadrunners. As part of the merger agreement, the Bulldogs were able to retain much of their team and staff that had been affiliated with the Canadiens to keep team continuity for the following season. Fans voted to keep the Bulldogs name which won over the Hamilton Canadiens and Hamilton Habs.

In the summer of 2004, Burlington businessman Michael Andlauer bought out much of the minority shares of the franchise to become majority owner, governor, and chairman of the Hamilton Bulldogs. Andlauer was part of the initial group of local businesspeople who purchased the Bulldogs team from the Edmonton Oilers and the Citadelles franchise from the Montreal Canadiens in 2002. By 2011, Andlauer owned 100% of the franchise.

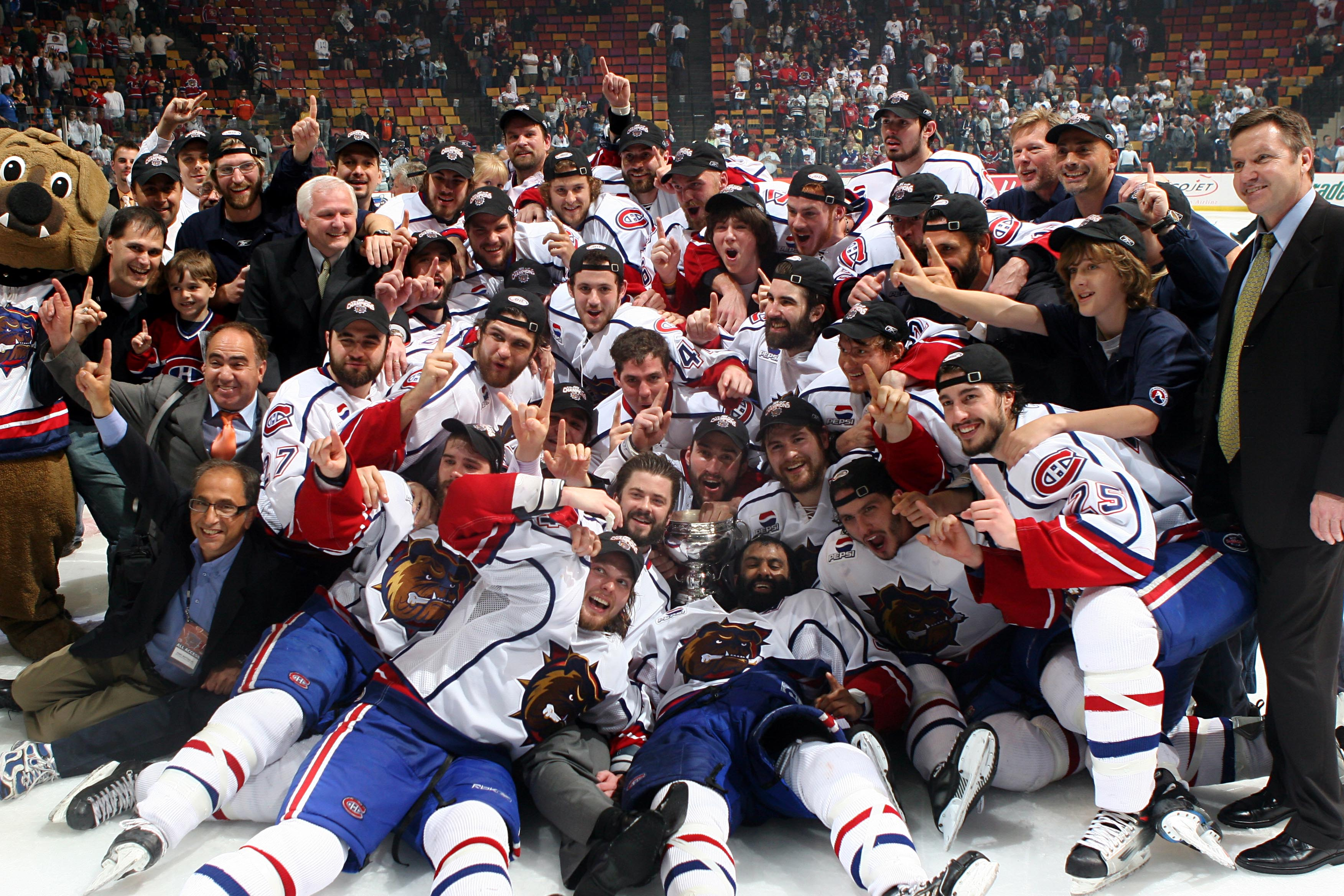
2006-07 Bulldogs with the Calder Cup

In the 2006–07 season, the Bulldogs won their first Calder Cup after defeating the Hershey Bears in the Calder Cup finals in five games. However, they failed to qualify for the playoffs in the 2007–08 season, making them the first defending Calder Cup champion to miss the playoffs in the following season since the Calder Cup playoff bracket expanded from 12 teams to 16 teams in 1996.

In 2010, fans saw the Bulldogs under coach Guy Boucher advance to the Western Conference finals against the Texas Stars, only to lose a hard-fought series in game seven.

=== 2015: repurchase by the Canadiens and relocation to St. John's ===
On March 12, 2015, Michael Andlauer announced that he had sold the Hamilton Bulldogs' AHL franchise back to the Canadiens, and that the team would move to St. John's, Newfoundland for the 2015–16 season as the St. John's IceCaps. The existing True North Sports and Entertainment-owned IceCaps, which are affiliated with the Winnipeg Jets, moved back to Winnipeg as the Manitoba Moose. Concurrently, Andlauer announced his acquisition of the Ontario Hockey League's Belleville Bulls, and that the team would be moved to Hamilton and adopt the Bulldogs name.

== Season-by-season results ==
Regular season												Playoffs				
Season	Games	Won	Lost	Tied	OTL	SOL	Points	PCT	Goals for	Goals against	Standing	Year	1st round	2nd round	3rd round	Finals
1996–97	80	28	39	9	4	—	69	.431	220	276	3rd, Canadian	1997	W, 3–2, SJF	W, 4–3, SJM	W, 4–1, ALB	L, 1–4, HER
1997–98	80	36	22	17	5	—	94	.588	264	242	2nd, Empire State	1998	W, 3–2, SYR	L, 0–4, ALB	—	—
1998–99	80	40	29	7	4	—	91	.569	229	206	3rd, Empire State	1999	W, 3–2, ALB	L, 2–4, RCH	—	—
1999–00	80	27	34	13	6	—	73	.456	225	262	3rd, Empire State	2000	W, 3–1, SYR	L, 2–4, RCH	—	—
2000–01	80	28	41	6	5	—	67	.419	227	281	4th, Canadian	2001	Did not qualify			
2001–02	80	37	30	10	3	—	87	.544	247	205	2nd, Canadian	2002	W, 3–0, QUE	W, 4–1, HFD	L, 3–4, BRI	—
2002–03	80	49	19	8	4	—	110	.688	279	191	1st, Canadian	2003	W, 3–1, SPR	W, 4–3, MTB	W, 4–1, BNG	L, 3–4, HOU
2003–04	80	41	25	10	4	—	96	.600	235	191	1st, North	2004	W, 4–2, CLE	L, 0–4, RCH	—	—
2004–05	80	38	29	—	6	7	89	.556	225	210	4th, North	2005	L, 0–4, RCH	—	—	—
2005–06	80	35	41	—	0	4	74	.463	225	251	6th, North	2006	Did not qualify			
2006–07	80	43	28	—	3	6	95	.594	243	208	3rd, North	2007	W, 4–2, RCH	W, 4–2, MTB	W, 4–1, CHI	W, 4–1, HER
2007–08	80	36	34	—	3	7	82	.513	208	235	4th, North	2008	Did not qualify			
2008–09	80	49	27	—	4	0	102	.638	263	201	2nd, North	2009	L, 2–4, GRG	—	—	—
2009–10	80	52	17	—	3	8	115	.719	271	182	1st, North	2010	W, 4–2, MTB	W 4–2, ABB	L, 3–4, TEX	—
2010–11	80	44	27	—	2	7	95	.606	229	192	1st, North	2011	W, 4–2, OKC	W, 4–3, MTB	L, 3–4, HOU	—
2011–12	76	34	35	—	2	5	75	.493	185	226	5th, North	2012	Did not qualify			
2012–13	76	29	41	—	1	5	64	.421	159	228	5th, North	2013	Did not qualify			
2013–14	76	33	35	—	1	7	74	.487	182	224	5th, North	2014	Did not qualify			
2014–15	76	34	29	—	12	1	81	.533	201	208	3rd, North	2015	Did not qualify			

== Players ==
=== Team captains ===
- Terran Sandwith 1996–98
- Jeff Daw 1998–99
- Rob Murray 1999–2000
- Scott Ferguson 2000–01
- Alain Nasreddine 2001–02
- Benoit Gratton 2002–04
- Jason Ward 2004–05
- Dan Smith 2005–06
- Ajay Baines 2007–08
- Kyle Chipchura 2008–09
- Mathieu Darche 2009
- Alex Henry 2009–2012
- Martin St. Pierre 2013–2014
- Gabriel Dumont 2014–15

=== American Hockey League Hall of Famers ===
AHL Hall of Fame Honored Members
Name	Seasons	Induction Year
Dennis Bonvie	1996-98 (player)	2024
Jean-Francois Labbe	1997-98 (player)	2016
Rob Murray	1999-2000 (player)	2017

=== Notable NHL alumni ===
List of Hamilton Bulldogs alumni who played more than 100 games in Hamilton and 100 or more games in the National Hockey League.

- Sven Andrighetto
- Francois Beauchemin
- Nathan Beaulieu
- Andre Benoit
- Marc-Andre Bergeron
- Mike Blunden
- Sean Brown
- Jason Chimera
- Kyle Chipchura
- Matt D'Agostini
- David Desharnais
- Scott Ferguson
- Ron Hainsey
- Alex Henry
- Chris Higgins
- Raitis Ivanans
- Andrei Kostitsyn
- Dan LaCouture
- Maxim Lapierre
- Georges Laraque
- Craig Millar
- Bryan Muir
- Brad Norton
- Ryan O'Byrne
- Greg Pateryn
- Fernando Pisani
- Tomas Plekanec
- Alexei Semenov
- Zack Stortini
- Jarred Tinordi
- Patrick Traverse
- Jason Ward
- Yannick Weber
- Ryan White

== Team records ==
=== Single season ===
Goals: Paul Healey, 39 (2000–01)
Assists: Daniel Cleary, 52 (1999–2000)
Points: David Desharnais, 78 (2009–10)
Penalty minutes: Dennis Bonvie, 522 (1996–97)
GAA: Cedrick Desjardins, 2.00 (2009–10)
SV%: Steve Passmore (1998–99) & Jaroslav Halak (2007–08), .929
Points: 115 (2009–10)
Most wins overall: 52 (2009–10)
Most wins at home: 25
Most wins on the road: 27

=== Playoffs ===
Playoff goaltending wins (1 season): Carey Price, 15 (2006–2007)

=== Career ===
Career goals: Corey Locke, 85
Career assists: Corey Locke, 144
Career points: Corey Locke, 229
Career penalty minutes: Dennis Bonvie, 817
Career goaltending wins: Yann Danis, 81
Career shutouts: Jaroslav Halak, 11
Career games: Alex Henry, 486

== Head coaches ==
- Lorne Molleken 1996–98
- Walt Kyle 1998–2000
- Claude Julien 2000–03
- Geoff Ward 2003
- Doug Jarvis 2003–05
- Don Lever 2005–2009
- Ron Wilson 2009–June 2009
- Guy Boucher 2009–2010
- Randy Cunneyworth 2010–2011
- Clement Jodoin 2011–2012
- Sylvain Lefebvre 2012–2015

== Team presidents and general managers ==
- Glen Sather, president, 1996–2000
- Scott Howson, general manager, 1996–2002
- Cary Kaplan, president, 2000–2002 (with club from 1996)
- Steve Katzman, president, 2002–2003
- Brian Lewis, 2003–2006
- Glenn Stanford, president, 2006–2010
- Bob McNamara, president, 2010–2011
- Stephen Ostaszewicz, president, 2012–2015
- Marc Bergevin, general manager, 2012–2015

== See also ==
- List of ice hockey teams in Ontario
