= Springfield Falcons =

Former ice hockey team in the American Hockey League

- Nickname: The Birds
- City: Springfield, Massachusetts
- League: American Hockey League
- Founded: 1994
- Operated: 1994–2016
- Folded: 2016 (now the Tucson Roadrunners)
- Home arena: MassMutual Center
- Colors: Blue, black, red, gray, white
- General manager: Bruce Landon
- Media: The Springfield Republican; WHYN NewsRadio 560; WSHM-LD, WWLP; WGGB-TV

Franchise history
- 1994–2016: Springfield Falcons
- 2016–present: Tucson Roadrunners

Championships
- Division titles: 4 (1995–96, 1997–98, 2012–13, 2013–14)

The Springfield Falcons were an ice hockey team in the American Hockey League (AHL) and played in Springfield, Massachusetts, at the MassMutual Center.

In 2016, the Falcons' franchise was purchased by the National Hockey League (NHL)'s Arizona Coyotes and relocated to Tucson, Arizona, before the start of the 2016–17 AHL season.

== History ==
=== Beginning ===
The Original Springfield Falcons logo used from 1994 to 2003

In 1994, the longtime AHL Springfield Indians team was sold to interests that moved the franchise to Worcester, Massachusetts, to become the Worcester IceCats (now the Abbotsford Canucks). Ex-Indian players Bruce Landon, then the general manager of the Indians, and Wayne LaChance, a local rink owner and former member of the Springfield Kings, secured an expansion franchise for Springfield for the 1994–95 season. The Indians name was still under trademark, so the new owners named the team after Andy and Amelia, a pair of nesting peregrine falcons that was a popular local civic symbol. The AHL, which was headquartered in nearby West Springfield, was keen to maintain a presence in a city that had hosted a team in the AHL or its predecessors for all but nine years since 1926, and readily granted an expansion franchise to Landon and LaChance.

The Falcons secured affiliation with both the Hartford Whalers and the Winnipeg Jets of the NHL. Since the Indians had been the Whalers' top affiliate in their last few years, this allowed the Falcons to secure most of the players who had played for the Indians the previous season. Veteran defenseman John Stevens (the last captain of the Indians, who shared the co-captaincy that first year with Rob Murray) scored the franchise's first goal.

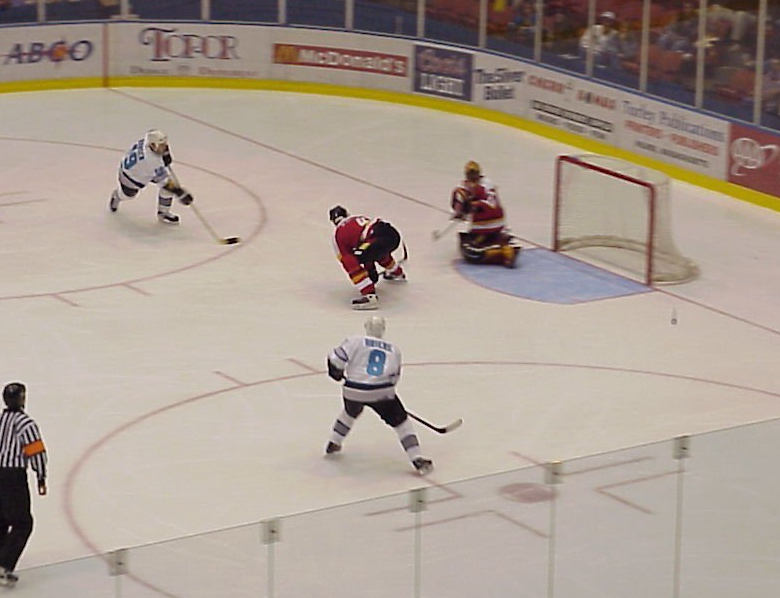
Tavis Hansen and Daniel Briere score against the Saint John Flames

Among the Falcons' early notable players were Jean-Guy Trudel, the franchise's leading career goal and point scorer; Daniel Briere of the Colorado Avalanche; Manny Legace, the franchise's all-time leading goaltender and former St. Louis Blues starter; Nikolai Khabibulin, former Stanley Cup winning goalie; and Rob Murray, the franchise's long-time captain and inspirational leader. During the 2004 season, Springfield fans voted on the Web for the club's 10th Anniversary Team, and selected Briere at center, Trudel at left wing, Tavis Hansen at right wing, Brad Tiley and Dan Focht on defense and Legace in goal.

Individual honors won by Falcons players during their first thirteen seasons included the Baz Bastien Award given to the league's best goaltender (to Legace in 1996 and Scott Langkow in 1998), Briere winning the Red Garrett Award emblematic of rookie of the year and a nod as First Team All-Star center in 1998, Tiley winning the Eddie Shore Award for the league's outstanding defenseman in 2000 and Trudel winning a Second Team All-Star award in 1999–00.

After the Whalers relocated to become the Carolina Hurricanes, the Falcons were subsequently affiliated exclusively with the Jets, an affiliation that continued when that team became the Phoenix Coyotes in 1996. The team was then affiliated with the Tampa Bay Lightning between 2004 and 2007.

The team had finished in first place in its division twice and made the playoffs six times in its first nine seasons. However, after three seasons affiliated with Tampa Bay and nine straight losing seasons, the team announced that it was exercising its option to sever relations with the Lightning. On March 19, 2007, they announced an affiliation with the Edmonton Oilers beginning in the 2007–08 season until the conclusion of the 2009–10 season.

=== Edmonton Oilers affiliation ===
On August 3, 2007, the team hired former Edmonton Oilers player Kelly Buchberger to be the head coach. After posting a .500 record, the Oilers promoted Buchberger to be an assistant coach on the Oilers staff. On June 17, 2008, assistant coach Jeff Truitt was named the team's tenth head coach. He was fired in February 2009, after 50 games, and replaced by former Houston Aeros coach Rob Daum. The Falcons finished the 2008–09 season with the worst record in the AHL.

On June 23, 2009, Oilers general manager Steve Tambellini announced that Daum would remain the head coach of the Springfield Falcons through the 2009–10 season. From November 25 to January 1, the Falcons went on a franchise record 17-game losing streak, recording only five points in that span. The Falcons finished the 2009–10 season as the worst team in the AHL once again, and was the only team that did not win at least 30 games. The lone bright spot from the season was Charles Linglet being named a Second Team All-Star.

On February 9, 2010, the Edmonton Oilers announced that they were severing ties with the Springfield Falcons to move their affiliation to Oklahoma City, a decision that had been expected for months.

=== Columbus Blue Jackets affiliation ===
On March 25, 2010, the Columbus Blue Jackets announced a one-year affiliation agreement with a one-year option. Also introduced was a new jersey and logo. The new logo still had a falcon holding a hockey stick, but the background was changed to grey, the word Falcons to red, and the word Springfield to navy blue. The new ECHL affiliation was with the Evansville IceMen.

Rob Riley, the former head coach at the United States Military Academy, was named the new head coach of the Falcons on August 3, 2010, replacing Daum. The Falcons opened the 2010–11 AHL season with a home-and-home matchup against the Providence Bruins. To honor the 75th anniversary of the AHL, each team wore throwback jerseys from 1936. The Bruins wore the jerseys of the Providence Reds while the Falcons wore the jerseys of the Springfield Indians. The Falcons won the first game in Providence 5–1, while the Bruins took the following game in Springfield 6–5.

On December 21, 2010, it was announced that the Falcons had been sold to Charlie Pompea, while Bruce Landon remained the minority owner, and continued to be the president/general manager.

During the 2011–12 season, the Falcons honored the Springfield hockey teams that had won the Calder Cup, wearing commemorative jerseys for those games, and honoring former coaches and players in pre-game festivities. Following the season, Rob Riley was fired as head coach after two seasons of missing the playoffs. Assistant coach Brad Larsen was named head coach for the 2012–13 season.

The 2012–13 season, beginning with the 2012–13 NHL lockout, saw the Falcons make the playoffs for the first time since 2003. With help of NHL players Matt Calvert, Cam Atkinson, Ryan Johansen, John Moore and Tim Erixon, the Falcons were able to take an early lead in both the Northeast Division and the Eastern Conference. When the NHL lockout ended and these players were called up to Columbus, the Falcons continued to stay at the top of the standings. All-Star play from goaltender Curtis McElhinney and forward Jonathan Marchessault, as well as veteran leadership from team captain Ryan Craig, helped guide the team to a first-place finish in the Northeast Division. On April 6, 2013, the Falcons qualified for the 2013 Calder Cup playoffs, ending a nine-year playoff drought, the longest in AHL history. The Falcons defeated the Manchester Monarchs in the first round three games to one, with all of their wins coming in overtime. The Falcons playoff run came to an end at the hands of the Syracuse Crunch, as the Crunch swept the Falcons out of the playoffs in their second round matchup. Winger Jonathan Marchessault was named to the First All-Star team, while goaltender Curtis McElhinney was named a Second Team All-Star.

The 2013–14 Falcons set a team record for wins (47) and points (100). They suffered a first round defeat in the playoffs at the hands of the Providence Bruins in five games.

On February 4, 2014, the Springfield Falcons announced that Bruce Landon would be retiring. Landon had served as president, general manager and co-owner since 1994. He remained with the team as director of hockey operations. Sarah Pompea, the daughter of owner Charlie Pompea, was named the new team president.

While it was initially announced that the entire coaching staff would return to Springfield for the 2014–15 season, head coach Brad Larsen was promoted to an assistant coach in Columbus. On June 16, 2014, Columbus announced that Jared Bednar would become head coach and he continued to be joined by assistant coach Nolan Pratt, in addition to first year assistant Toby Petersen. In the 2014–15 season, the team set a franchise record with 11 consecutive wins. The streak lasted from November 14 through December 6, and propelled the Falcons back into first place in the Northeast Division. However, a poor March cost the team as they missed the playoffs, finishing in ninth place in the Eastern Conference.

=== Arizona Coyotes affiliation ===
On April 17, 2015, the Springfield Falcons and Arizona Coyotes announced that they had reached a three-year affiliation agreement. This was part of change of affiliations for the 2015–16 season where Columbus would have their AHL team in Cleveland, the Colorado Avalanche in San Antonio and the Florida Panthers would be tied to the Portland Pirates.

The Coyotes hired Ron Rolston as the team's head coach, with Doug Janik and Mike Bavis as his assistants for the 2015–16 season. Dustin Jeffrey was named a Second Team All-Star, although he finished the season with the Wilkes-Barre/Scranton Penguins after being traded at the trade deadline. The season was one of the worst in franchise history and marked the 11th time in 13 seasons that the club missed the playoffs, finishing with the second lowest points percentage in the AHL and the most regulation losses.

On April 19, 2016, the Arizona Coyotes signed an agreement to purchase the team. The Coyotes had been in negotiations to relocate the franchise to Tucson, Arizona, for the 2016–17 season and join the other AHL Pacific Division teams created in the previous season.

On May 4, 2016, the Portland Pirates announced that it had signed a letter of intent with an outside buyer to sell and relocate the franchise for the 2016–17 season. It was reported that the team would be relocated to Springfield following the pending sale and relocation of the Falcons franchise.

The AHL Board of Governors conditionally approved of the sale and relocation of the Falcons on May 10, pending approval of a deal through Tucson's city council. On May 17, the Coyotes and the Tucson city council came to terms on a lease agreement for the 2016–17 season to meet the conditions of the AHL approval. The team became the Tucson Roadrunners. The Pirates' sale and relocation to Springfield was approved on May 23, to subsequently become the Springfield Thunderbirds.

This market was previously home to:

- Springfield Indians (1926–1994)

== Season-by-season results ==
Regular season												Playoffs					
Season	Games	Won	Lost	Tied	OTL	SOL	Points	PCT	Goals for	Goals against	Standing	Year	Prelims	1st round	2nd round	3rd round	Finals
1994–95	80	31	37	12	—	—	74	.463	269	289	5th, North	1995	Out of playoffs				
1995–96	80	42	22	11	5	—	100	.625	272	215	1st, North	1996	—	W, 3–1, PRO	L, 2–4, POR	—	—
1996–97	80	41	25	12	2	—	96	.600	268	229	2nd, New England	1997	—	W, 3–2, POR	W, 4–1, PRO	L, 3–4, HER	—
1997–98	80	45	26	7	2	—	99	.619	278	248	1st, New England	1998	—	L, 1–3, WOR	—	—	—
1998–99	80	35	35	9	1	—	80	.500	245	232	3rd, New England	1999	—	L, 0–3, HAR	—	—	—
1999–00	80	33	35	11	1	—	78	.488	272	252	4th, New England	2000	—	L, 2–3, HAR	—	—	—
2000–01	80	29	37	8	6	—	72	.450	253	280	6th, New England	2001	Out of playoffs				
2001–02	80	35	41	2	2	—	74	.463	213	237	5th, North	2002	Out of playoffs				
2002–03	80	34	38	7	1	—	76	.475	202	243	4th, East	2003	W, 2–0 HAR	L, 1–3, HAM	—	—	—
2003–04	80	26	43	9	2	—	63	.394	179	234	7th, Atlantic	2004	Out of playoffs				
2004–05	80	24	47	—	3	6	57	.356	161	255	7th, Atlantic	2005	Out of playoffs				
2005–06	80	28	43	—	3	6	65	.406	220	312	6th, Atlantic	2006	Out of playoffs				
2006–07	80	28	49	—	1	2	59	.369	181	268	7th, Atlantic	2007	Out of playoffs				
2007–08	80	35	35	—	5	5	80	.500	214	257	5th, Atlantic	2008	Out of playoffs				
2008–09	80	24	44	—	8	4	60	.375	188	258	7th, Atlantic	2009	Out of playoffs				
2009–10	80	25	39	—	12	4	66	.413	207	296	8th, Atlantic	2010	Out of playoffs				
2010–11	80	35	40	—	2	3	75	.469	232	253	6th, Atlantic	2011	Out of playoffs				
2011–12	76	36	34	—	3	3	78	.513	217	231	4th, Northeast	2012	Out of playoffs				
2012–13	76	45	22	—	5	4	99	.651	235	186	1st, Northeast	2013	—	W, 3–1, MAN	L, 0-4, SYR	—	—
2013–14	76	47	23	—	1	5	100	.651	247	212	1st, Northeast	2014	—	L, 2-3, PRO	—	—	—
2014–15	76	38	28	—	8	2	86	.566	192	209	3rd, Northeast	2015	Out of playoffs				
2015–16	76	26	42	—	3	5	60	.395	194	265	8th, Atlantic	2016	Out of playoffs				

== Players ==
=== Retired numbers ===
- No. 2: Eddie Shore
- No. 23: Rob Murray

Note: Former AHL President Jack Butterfield and Vice-President Gordie Anziano, longtime Springfield residents, were honored with banners raised with the retired numbers.

=== Team awards ===
At the end of each season, the team awarded individual players with:

- The Jim Denver "Good Guy" Award
- The Al Lawrence Best Defensive Player Award
- The Florence Kurdziel "Unsung Hero" Award
- The Muriel Strauss Good Sportsmanship Award
- The Dick Casey True Grit Award
- The Ross Lowe Award as team MVP

=== Team captains ===
- John Stevens, Rob Murray (co-captains) 1994–1996
- Rob Murray 1996–99
- Tavis Hansen 1999–01
- Jean-Guy Trudel 2001–02
- Rob Murray 2002-03
- Shane Willis 2004-05
- Ryan Craig 2005–06
- Norm Milley 2006–07
- Rick Berry 2007–08
- Tim Sestito 2008–09
- Dean Arsene 2009–10
- Ben Guite 2010–11
- Dane Byers 2011–12
- Ryan Craig 2012–15
- Craig Cunningham 2015–2016

=== Notable NHL alumni ===
List of Springfield Falcons alumni who played at least 100 games in Springfield and played 100 or more games in the National Hockey League:

- Ramzi Abid
- Nikita Alexeev
- Frank Banham
- Goran Bezina
- Daniel Briere
- Matt Calvert
- Michael Chaput
- Taylor Chorney
- Martin Cibak
- Sean Collins
- Ryan Craig
- Jeff Daniels
- Devan Dubnyk
- Robert Esche
- Cody Goloubef
- Martin Grenier
- Ravil Gusmanov
- Nick Holden
- Jean-Francois Jacques
- Tomas Kubalik
- Scott Langkow
- Manny Legace
- Francois Leroux
- Trevor Letowski
- Scott Levins
- Marek Malik
- Jonathan Marchessault
- Steve Martins
- Maxim Mayorov
- Colin McDonald
- John Moore
- Rob Murray
- Theo Peckham
- Nolan Pratt
- Dalton Prout
- Liam Reddox
- Jay Rosehill
- Kirill Safronov
- David Savard
- Lukas Sedlak
- Robert Schnabel
- Rob Schremp
- Tim Sestito
- Wyatt Smith
- John Stevens
- Radoslav Suchy
- Nick Tarnasky
- Brent Thompson
- Shane Willis

== AHL Hall of Fame members ==
List of Springfield Falcons alumni later inducted into the AHL Hall of Fame.

- Bryan Helmer
- Rob Murray
- Brad Smyth
- John Stevens

In addition, team owner Bruce Landon was also inducted into the AHOF.

== Team records ==
=== Single season ===
Goals: John LeBlanc, 39 (1994–95)
Goals by a rookie: Daniel Briere, 36 (1997–98)
Assists: Jean-Guy Trudel, 65 (2000–01)
Points: Jean-Guy Trudel, 99 (2000–01)
Penalty minutes: Rob Murray, 373 (1994–95)
Appearances by a goalie: Devan Dubnyk, 62 (2008–09)
GAA: Manny Legace 2.27 (1995–96)
SV%: Curtis McElhinney, .923 (2012–13)
Shutouts: Curtis McElhinney, 9 (2012–13)

=== Career ===
These are the top ten scorers in Falcons' history. Note: Pos = Position; GP = Games played; G = Goals; A = Assists; Pts = Points

Player	Pos	GP	G	A	Pts
Jean-Guy Trudel	LW	228	90	152	242
Rob Murray	RW	501	61	157	218
Daniel Briere	RW	169	88	129	217
Jason Jaspers	C	317	86	114	200
Ryan Craig	LW	305	94	86	180
Brad Tiley	D	239	33	130	163
Tavis Hansen	C	298	79	79	158
Eric Healey	LW	178	57	80	137
Jason McBain	D	208	35	87	122
Rob Schremp	F	147	30	88	118

Career penalty minutes: 1529 Rob Murray
Career goaltending wins: 64 Manny Legace
Career shutouts: 9 Curtis McElhinney
Career games: 501 Rob Murray
Career goals: 94 Ryan Craig
Career shorthanded goals: 5 Andrew Joudrey

=== Single game ===
Goals: 4 Jean-Guy Trudel, Daniel Briere, Grant Potulny, Chad Wiseman, Jack Skille
Points: 6 Chad Wiseman

== List of NHL affiliates ==
- Hartford Whalers 1994–1997
- Winnipeg Jets/Phoenix Coyotes/Arizona Coyotes 1994–2004, 2015–2016
- Tampa Bay Lightning 2001–2003, 2004–2007
- Edmonton Oilers 2007–2010
- Columbus Blue Jackets 2010–2015
