= Lowell Devils =

Ice hockey team

- City: Lowell, Massachusetts
- League: American Hockey League
- Operated: 1998–2010
- Home arena: Tsongas Center
- Colors: Red, black, white
- Owner: New Jersey Devils
- Affiliates: New York Islanders (1998–2001); Los Angeles Kings (2000–2001); Carolina Hurricanes (2001–2006); Calgary Flames (2003–2005); Colorado Avalanche (2005–2006); New Jersey Devils (2006–2010)

Franchise history
- 1998–2006: Lowell Lock Monsters
- 2006–2010: Lowell Devils
- 2010–2017: Albany Devils
- 2017–2021: Binghamton Devils
- 2021–present: Utica Comets

Championships
- Division titles: 2: (1998–99, 2001–02)

The Lowell Devils were a minor league ice hockey team in the American Hockey League playing in Lowell, Massachusetts, at the Tsongas Center. As their name implied, they were the top minor league affiliate of the New Jersey Devils of the National Hockey League. The team was founded in 1998 as the Lowell Lock Monsters and was purchased by the Devils in 2006.

After the 2009–10 season, the Devils agreed to move the Lowell franchise to Albany, New York, where their previous AHL affiliate, the Albany River Rats, had played. The new team then became the Albany Devils.

== History ==
Founded as the Lowell Lock Monsters in 1998, the team served as the top AHL affiliate of the New York Islanders for three seasons, the last of which was shared with the Los Angeles Kings. In 2001, the team became the AHL affiliate of the Carolina Hurricanes, serving in that capacity for five seasons, portions of which the affiliation was shared with the Calgary Flames and Colorado Avalanche.

The team was purchased by the New Jersey Devils in 2006 and took the Devils' name for the start of the 2006–07 season. In effect, the Devils' move was an affiliate swap as the Hurricanes contracted with the Devils' former affiliate in Albany. In Lowell, the Devils averaged 2,293 fans per game during the 2008–09 season while receiving the AHL Excellence Award for the Eastern Conference for group sales.

In February 2010, the University of Massachusetts Lowell took ownership of the Tsongas Center from the City of Lowell. Negotiations began between the University and the Devils for a lease extension, with the current lease set to expire at the end of the 2009–10 season. They could not come to an agreement and the Devils explored other options. They eventually struck an agreement with Albany, who was to lose the River Rats after the Hurricanes elected to move their top minor league affiliate to Charlotte, North Carolina, as the Charlotte Checkers. Following the season, the Lowell Devils ceased to exist.

== Season-by-season results ==
=== Regular season ===
| Season | Games | Won | Lost | Tied | OTL | SOL | Points | Goals for | Goals against | Standing |
|---|---|---|---|---|---|---|---|---|---|---|
| 1998–99 | 80 | 33 | 32 | 13 | 2 | — | 81 | 219 | 237 | 1st, Atlantic |
| 1999–00 | 80 | 33 | 36 | 7 | 4 | — | 77 | 228 | 240 | 3rd, Atlantic |
| 2000–01 | 80 | 35 | 35 | 5 | 5 | — | 80 | 225 | 244 | 4th, New England |
| 2001–02 | 80 | 41 | 25 | 11 | 3 | — | 96 | 229 | 209 | 1st, North |
| 2002–03 | 80 | 19 | 51 | 7 | 3 | — | 48 | 175 | 275 | 5th, North |
| 2003–04 | 80 | 32 | 36 | 6 | 6 | — | 76 | 208 | 242 | 6th, Atlantic |
| 2004–05 | 80 | 47 | 27 | 5 | 1 | — | 100 | 242 | 190 | 3rd, Atlantic |
| 2005–06 | 80 | 29 | 37 | — | 6 | 8 | 72 | 222 | 257 | 5th, Atlantic |
| 2006–07 | 80 | 38 | 30 | — | 6 | 6 | 88 | 212 | 220 | 5th, Atlantic |
| 2007–08 | 80 | 25 | 43 | — | 7 | 5 | 62 | 183 | 270 | 7th, Atlantic |
| 2008–09 | 80 | 35 | 36 | — | 2 | 7 | 79 | 213 | 243 | 6th, Atlantic |
| 2009–10 | 80 | 39 | 31 | — | 4 | 6 | 88 | 239 | 232 | 4th, Atlantic |

=== Playoffs ===
| Season | 1st round | 2nd round | 3rd round | Finals |
|---|---|---|---|---|
| 1999 | L, 0–3, Saint John | — | — | — |
| 2000 | W, 3–0, Saint John | L, 0–4, Providence | — | — |
| 2001 | L, 1–3, Worcester | — | — | — |
| 2002 | L, 2–3, St. John's | — | — | — |
| 2003 | Did not qualify | | | |
| 2004 | Did not qualify | | | |
| 2005 | W, 4–2, Hartford | L, 1–4, Providence | — | — |
| 2006 | Did not qualify | | | |
| 2007 | Did not qualify | | | |
| 2008 | Did not qualify | | | |
| 2009 | Did not qualify | | | |
| 2010 | L, 1–4, Worcester | — | — | — |

== Players ==
=== Team records ===
Single season
Goals: Chuck Kobasew (38) - 2004–05
Assists: Keith Aucoin (56) - 2005–06
Points: Keith Aucoin (85) - 2005–06
Penalty Minutes: Louis Robitaille (250) - 2009–10
GAA: Cam Ward (1.99) - 2004–05
SV%: Cam Ward (.937) - 2004–05

Career
Career Goals: Mike Zigomanis (77)
Career Assists: Mike Zigomanis (114)
Career Points: Mike Zigomanis (191)
Career Penalty Minutes: Mark Fraser (321)
Career Goaltending Wins: Jeff Frazee (42)
Career Shutouts: Brent Krahn, Cam Ward (6)
Career Games: Mike Zigomanis (254)

=== American Hockey League Hall of Famers ===
AHL Hall of Fame Honored Members
| Name | Seasons | Induction Year |
|---|---|---|
| Keith Aucoin | 2001-02, 2005-06 (player) | 2022 |
| Bruce Boudreau | 1999-2001 (head coach) | 2009 |

Affiliates

- New York Islanders (1998–2001)
- Los Angeles Kings (1999–2001)
- Carolina Hurricanes (2001–2006)
- Calgary Flames (2003–2005)
- Colorado Avalanche (2005–2006)
- New Jersey Devils (2006–2010)
