= Dale Purinton =

American ice hockey player (born 1976)

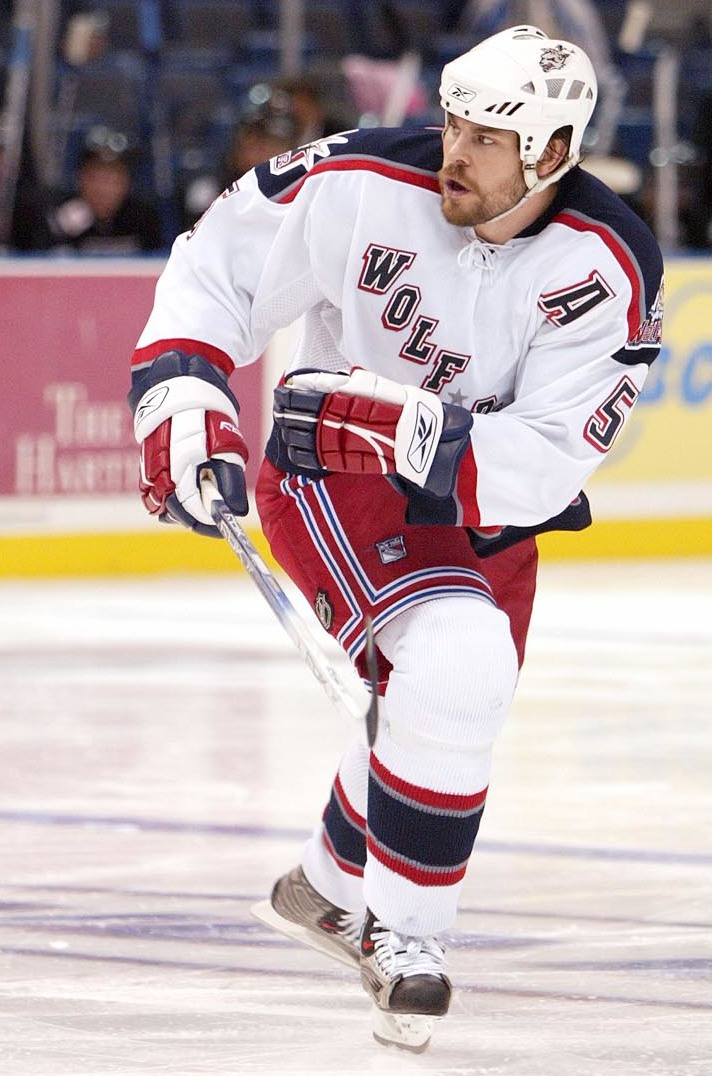
- Purinton with the Hartford Wolf Pack in 2005
- Born: October 11, 1976 (age 49) Fort Wayne, Indiana, U.S.
- Height: 6 ft 3 in (191 cm)
- Weight: 229 lb (104 kg; 16 st 5 lb)
- Position: Defense
- Shot: Left
- Played for: New York Rangers
- NHL draft: 117th overall, 1995; New York Rangers
- Playing career: 1997–2008

Dale Purinton (born October 11, 1976) is an American former professional ice hockey defenseman, known as an enforcer, who played 181 games for the New York Rangers in the National Hockey League.

== Playing career ==
Purinton was drafted in the 5th round, 117th overall, by the New York Rangers in the 1995 NHL entry draft. He spent the early part of his career in the WHL, ECHL, and AHL before his NHL debut in the 1999–2000 season.

In 181 NHL games Purinton racked up 578 penalty minutes to go with his 4 goals and 16 assists. After completing the 2007–08 season with the Lake Erie Monsters of the American Hockey League, he became an unrestricted free agent and upon failing to sign with a new team, subsequently retired.

== Coaching career ==
Purinton was hired as head coach of the Cowichan Valley Capitals of the BCHL on October 18, 2009. He was later hired as head coach of the Kerry Park Islanders of the VIJHL.

== Personal life ==
Purinton was born in Fort Wayne, Indiana, but his family moved to Sicamous, British Columbia when he was four years old.

On August 11, 2015, Purinton was arrested in Oneida County, New York on charges of burglary.

== Career statistics ==
			Regular season					Playoffs
Season	Team	League	GP	G	A	Pts	PIM	GP	G	A	Pts	PIM
1992–93	Moose Jaw Warriors AAA	SMHL	34	1	6	7	107	—	—	—	—	—
1992–93	Moose Jaw Warriors	WHL	2	0	0	0	2	—	—	—	—	—
1993–94	Vernon Lakers	BCHL	42	1	6	7	194	—	—	—	—	—
1994–95	Tacoma Rockets	WHL	65	0	8	8	291	3	0	0	0	13
1995–96	Kelowna Rockets	WHL	22	1	4	5	88	—	—	—	—	—
1995–96	Lethbridge Hurricanes	WHL	37	3	6	9	144	4	1	1	2	25
1996–97	Lethbridge Hurricanes	WHL	51	6	26	32	254	18	3	5	8	88
1997–98	Charlotte Checkers	ECHL	34	3	5	8	186	—	—	—	—	—
1997–98	Hartford Wolf Pack	AHL	17	0	0	0	95	—	—	—	—	—
1998–99	Hartford Wolf Pack	AHL	45	1	3	4	306	7	0	2	2	24
1999–2000	Hartford Wolf Pack	AHL	62	4	4	8	415	23	0	3	3	87
1999–2000	New York Rangers	NHL	1	0	0	0	7	—	—	—	—	—
2000–01	Hartford Wolf Pack	AHL	11	0	1	1	75	—	—	—	—	—
2000–01	New York Rangers	NHL	42	0	2	2	180	—	—	—	—	—
2001–02	New York Rangers	NHL	40	0	4	4	113	—	—	—	—	—
2002–03	New York Rangers	NHL	58	3	9	12	161	—	—	—	—	—
2003–04	New York Rangers	NHL	40	1	1	2	117	—	—	—	—	—
2004–05	Victoria Salmon Kings	ECHL	25	3	9	12	192	—	—	—	—	—
2005–06	Hartford Wolf Pack	AHL	25	3	3	6	109	10	0	2	2	45
2006–07	Hartford Wolf Pack	AHL	55	3	7	10	240	5	0	1	1	29
2007–08	Lake Erie Monsters	AHL	35	0	4	4	193	—	—	—	—	—
AHL totals			250	11	22	33	1433	45	0	8	8	185
NHL totals			181	4	16	20	578	—	—	—	—	—

== Suspensions ==
This is a list of suspensions that he has received:

- April 8, 2008,

The AHL suspended Purinton three games for his actions during an April 4 game in Hamilton.

- March 27, 2008,

The AHL suspended Purinton three games for his actions during a game on March 26. The three-game suspension was automatic after Purinton received his fifth game misconduct in the general category this season.

- March 20, 2008,

The AHL suspended Purinton one game for his actions during pre-game warms ups prior to an AHL game against Grand Rapids.

- March 15, 2008,

The AHL suspended Purinton for 2 games for accumulating 4 misconducts in one season. His latest came in the first period of a game against the Grand Rapids Griffins in which he kneed right winger Jamie Tardif.

- February 19, 2008,

The AHL suspended Purinton for four games for his actions in a game against Hamilton.

- October 19, 2007,

The AHL suspended Purinton for 25 games for punching Stars' forward Marius Holtet in the head from behind with a gloved fist after the completion of play during a game between Lake Erie and Iowa.

- April 26, 2006

The AHL suspended him for 1 game for instigation a fight during the last 5 minutes of a game.

- October 1, 2005

On October 4 the NHL handed out a 10-game suspension for an attempt to eye-gouge Colton Orr in a pre-season game.

- 2004–05 season in the ECHL

suspended by the ECHL on December 10 for 6 games for elbowing a player into the head during the game vs Bakersfield on December 7.
Later in the season the ECHL suspended him for 3 games for his refusal to stop fighting and pulling the hair of a player. As a result, the Salmon Kings released him. He only played 25 games that season and racked up 192 penalty minutes.

- February 2002

The NHL handed out a 3-game suspension for a sucker-punch to Jason Blake of the New York Islanders.

- October 2001

The NHL handed out a 7-game suspension for a cross-check to the head of Stephen Peat of the Washington Capitals.

- September 2001

The NHL handed out a 4-game suspension for beating up goaltender Garth Snow in an NHL pre-season game.

- 1999

Purinton suspended by the AHL for 3 games during the 1998–1999 season.

== See also ==
- Violence in ice hockey
- Fighting in ice hockey
