= Hartford Wolf Pack =

American Hockey League team in Hartford, Connecticut

- City: Hartford, Connecticut
- League: American Hockey League
- Conference: Eastern
- Division: Atlantic
- Founded: 1926 (CAHL)
- Home arena: PeoplesBank Arena
- Colors: Blue, red, white
- Owner: Madison Square Garden, Inc.
- General manager: Ryan Martin
- Head coach: Jay Leach
- Captain: Marc Del Gaizo
- Media: MSG Network; AHL.TV (Internet); Mixlr (Internet)
- Affiliates: New York Rangers (NHL)

Franchise history
- 1926–1976: Providence Reds
- 1976–1977: Rhode Island Reds
- 1977–1980: Binghamton Dusters
- 1980–1990: Binghamton Whalers
- 1990–1997: Binghamton Rangers
- 1997–2010: Hartford Wolf Pack
- 2010–2013: Connecticut Whale
- 2013–present: Hartford Wolf Pack

Championships
- Regular season titles: 1: (1999–00)
- Division titles: 4: (1999–00, 2003–04, 2008–09, 2014–15)
- Conference titles: 1: (1999–00)
- Calder Cups: 1: (1999–00)

The Hartford Wolf Pack are a professional ice hockey team based in Hartford, Connecticut. A member of the American Hockey League (AHL), they play their home games at the PeoplesBank Arena (Formerly known as XL Center). The team was established in 1926 as the Providence Reds. After a series of relocations, the team moved to Hartford in 1997 as the Hartford Wolf Pack. It is one of the oldest professional hockey franchises in existence, and the oldest continuously operating minor league hockey franchise in North America.

The franchise was renamed the Connecticut Whale in October 2010, in honor of the former Hartford Whalers of the National Hockey League (NHL), but reverted to their current name after the 2012–13 AHL season. The Wolf Pack is the top affiliate of the NHL's New York Rangers and is one of two remaining professional hockey teams in Connecticut.

== History ==
The franchise that became the Wolf Pack was founded in 1926 in Providence, Rhode Island as the Providence Reds, one of the five charter members of the Canadian-American Hockey League. In 1936, the Northeast-based CAHL merged with the Midwest-based International Hockey League to form the International-American Hockey League, which dropped the "International" from its name in 1940.

The Reds — known as the Rhode Island Reds for their final season— folded after the 1976–77 season. Shortly afterward, the owners of the Broome Dusters of the North American Hockey League bought the Reds franchise and moved it to Binghamton, New York as the Binghamton Dusters. After securing an affiliation with the Hartford Whalers in 1980, the team changed its name to the Binghamton Whalers. An affiliation change to the Rangers in 1990 — one that continues to this day — brought another new name, the Binghamton Rangers.

After the 1996–97 NHL season, the Whalers moved to Raleigh, North Carolina as the Carolina Hurricanes. Soon after the Whalers' departure, the Binghamton Rangers relocated to Hartford and began to play at the vacated Hartford Civic Center (today known as the PeoplesBank Arena).

Following a "name-the-team" contest, the franchise became the Hartford Wolf Pack, a reference to a submarine class as well as the tactic known as "wolfpacking". With Connecticut being home to both the main builder of submarines (General Dynamics Electric Boat) and the US Navy's primary submarine base, honoring the state's naval tradition was the paramount goal. The name Seawolf, a reference to the Seawolf-class submarines was considered to have been the ideal name for the team. However, it had already been taken by the Mississippi Sea Wolves of the East Coast Hockey League. Following the submarine theme, the mascot was named "Sonar".

The Connecticut Whale logo, used from 2010 to 2013

The Wolf Pack's first coach was E.J. McGuire, and their first home game was played in front of a crowd of 12,934 fans on October 4, 1997. P.J. Stock scored the first home goal in Wolf Pack history. The first franchise goal was scored the night prior in Providence, R.I., by Pierre Sevigny. The team reached the playoffs during the first 12 years of their existence and won the Calder Cup in 2000, defeating the Rochester Americans in the Cup finals. Derek Armstrong won the Jack A. Butterfield Trophy as AHL playoff MVP.

In mid-2010, the Rangers entered into a business relationship which gave former Whalers owner Howard Baldwin and his company, Hartford Hockey LLC (doing business as Whalers Sports & Entertainment), control of the team's business operations. On September 20, 2010, Baldwin announced the Wolf Pack would change their name to the Connecticut Whale in honor of the Whalers. The name change took place on November 27, 2010; the final game with the "Wolf Pack" name came on November 26, 2010. The opponent was Connecticut's other AHL team, the Bridgeport Sound Tigers. The Sound Tigers won 4–3, in a shootout. On November 27, 2010, the team played their first game under the new "Whale" name. The opponent was, again, the Sound Tigers. The Whale won 3–2, in a shootout. The attendance for the debut game was 13,089, which is the third-largest crowd in franchise history. On January 1, 2011, the Whale debuted new home jerseys featuring light blue instead of green, however, the color was shelved for the 2011–12 season.

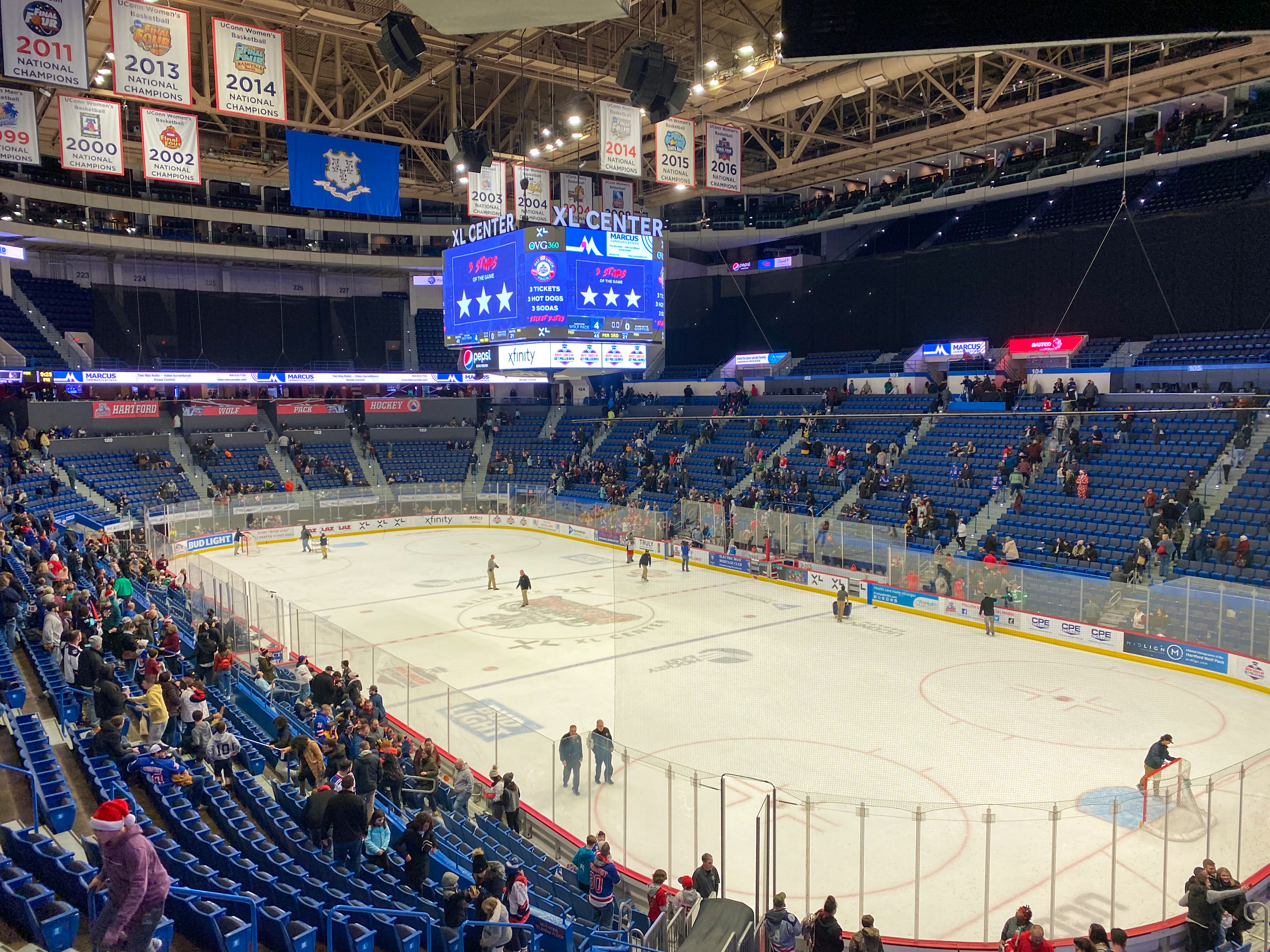
A picture of the XL Center after a Hartford Wolfpack game on December 10, 2022.

The Whale were hosts and participants in the 2011 AHL Outdoor Classic, the Whale Bowl, held at Rentschler Field in East Hartford, Connecticut. Connecticut fell to the Providence Bruins, 5–4, in a shootout.

In June 2012, after just 21 months, the New York Rangers terminated their business relationship with Baldwin after he and his company ran up a debt of almost $3 million and had about 15 court cases against him.

In April 2013, just two and a half seasons after rebranding as the Whale, the team decided it would revert to the nickname "Wolf Pack" for the following season. Global Spectrum, the group now marketing the team and managers of the XL Center arena, announced in May 2013 that the franchise had officially returned to the Hartford Wolf Pack identity.

Although the Wolf Pack does not officially acknowledge its past in Providence and Binghamton (or claim the Reds' four Calder Cups), it is the only AHL franchise to have never missed a season since the league's founding in 1936. In one form or another, the franchise has iced a team every year since 1926. The Wolf Pack and Abbotsford Canucks — the descendants of another charter AHL member, the Springfield Indians — are the oldest minor-league hockey franchises in North America. However, the Indians were inactive for three seasons in the 1930s, making the Wolf Pack the oldest continuously operating minor-league hockey franchise in North America. The only professional hockey franchises older than the Wolf Pack and the Canucks are the NHL's Montreal Canadiens, Toronto Maple Leafs and Boston Bruins.

== Team information ==
=== Mascots ===
The Wolf Pack started in 1997 with one mascot, a wolf named Sonar. The name was chosen to keep with the submarine theme that the team had used in their naming and logo. Following the folding of their sister team, the Arena Football League's New England Sea Wolves, the Wolf Pack added the Sea Wolves' mascot, named Torpedo; this mascot has since been retired. In 2010, with the renaming of the team to the Connecticut Whale, Sonar was joined as a mascot by former Whalers mascot Pucky the Whale. Sonar took the 2012–13 season off while Pucky was the sole mascot. When the naming arrangement ended, Sonar came back while Pucky was retired.

== Season-by-season results ==
| Regular season | | | | | | | | | | | | Playoffs | | | | | |
| Season | Games | Won | Lost | Tied | OTL | SOL | Points | PCT | Goals for | Goals against | Standing | Year | Prelims | 1st round | 2nd round | 3rd round | Final |
|---|---|---|---|---|---|---|---|---|---|---|---|---|---|---|---|---|---|
| 1997–98 | 80 | 43 | 24 | 12 | 1 | — | 99 | .619 | 272 | 227 | 2nd, New England | 1998 | — | W, 3–0, BNH | W, 4–3, WOR | L, 1–4, SJF | — |
| 1998–99 | 80 | 38 | 31 | 5 | 6 | — | 87 | .544 | 256 | 256 | 2nd, New England | 1999 | — | W, 3–0, SPR | L, 0–4, PRO | — | — |
| 1999–2000 | 80 | 49 | 22 | 7 | 2 | — | 107 | .669 | 249 | 198 | 1st, New England | 2000 | — | W, 3–2, SPR | W, 4–1, WOR | W, 4–3, PRO | W, 4–2, RCH |
| 2000–01 | 80 | 40 | 26 | 8 | 6 | — | 94 | .588 | 263 | 247 | 2nd, New England | 2001 | — | L, 2–3, PRO | — | — | — |
| 2001–02 | 80 | 41 | 26 | 10 | 3 | — | 95 | .594 | 249 | 243 | 2nd, East | 2002 | BYE | W, 3–2, MAN | L, 1–4, HAM | — | — |
| 2002–03 | 80 | 33 | 27 | 12 | 8 | — | 86 | .538 | 255 | 236 | 3rd, East | 2003 | L, 0–2, SPR | — | — | — | — |
| 2003–04 | 80 | 44 | 22 | 12 | 2 | — | 102 | .638 | 198 | 153 | 1st, Atlantic | 2004 | BYE | W, 4–1, POR | W, 4–0, WOR | L, 3–4, WBS | — |
| 2004–05 | 80 | 50 | 24 | — | 3 | 3 | 106 | .663 | 206 | 160 | 2nd, Atlantic | 2005 | — | L, 2–4, LOW | — | — | — |
| 2005–06 | 80 | 48 | 24 | — | 6 | 2 | 104 | .650 | 292 | 231 | 2nd, Atlantic | 2006 | — | W, 4–3, MAN | L, 2–4, POR | — | — |
| 2006–07 | 80 | 47 | 29 | — | 3 | 1 | 98 | .613 | 231 | 201 | 2nd, Atlantic | 2007 | — | L, 3–4, PRO | — | — | — |
| 2007–08 | 80 | 50 | 20 | — | 2 | 8 | 110 | .688 | 266 | 198 | 2nd, Atlantic | 2008 | — | L, 1–4, POR | — | — | — |
| 2008–09 | 80 | 46 | 27 | — | 3 | 4 | 99 | .619 | 243 | 216 | 1st, Atlantic | 2009 | — | L, 2–4, WOR | — | — | — |
| 2009–10 | 80 | 36 | 33 | — | 6 | 5 | 83 | .519 | 231 | 251 | 6th, Atlantic | 2010 | — | Did not qualify | | | |
| 2010–11 | 80 | 40 | 32 | — | 2 | 6 | 88 | .550 | 221 | 223 | 3rd, Atlantic | 2011 | — | L, 2–4, POR | — | — | — |
| 2011–12 | 76 | 36 | 26 | — | 7 | 7 | 86 | .566 | 210 | 208 | 2nd, Northeast | 2012 | — | W, 3–0, BRI | L, 2–4, NOR | — | — |
| 2012–13 | 76 | 35 | 32 | — | 6 | 3 | 79 | .520 | 213 | 222 | 2nd, Northeast | 2013 | — | Did not qualify | | | |
| 2013–14 | 76 | 37 | 32 | — | 1 | 6 | 81 | .533 | 202 | 220 | 3rd, Northeast | 2014 | — | Did not qualify | | | |
| 2014–15 | 76 | 43 | 24 | — | 5 | 4 | 95 | .625 | 221 | 214 | 1st, Northeast | 2015 | — | W, 3–2, PRO | W, 4–2, HER | L, 0–4, MAN | — |
| 2015–16 | 76 | 41 | 32 | — | 3 | 0 | 85 | .559 | 202 | 199 | 6th, Atlantic | 2016 | — | Did not qualify | | | |
| 2016–17 | 76 | 24 | 46 | — | 4 | 2 | 54 | .355 | 194 | 280 | 7th, Atlantic | 2017 | — | Did not qualify | | | |
| 2017–18 | 76 | 34 | 33 | — | 6 | 3 | 77 | .507 | 208 | 252 | 6th, Atlantic | 2018 | — | Did not qualify | | | |
| 2018–19 | 76 | 29 | 36 | — | 7 | 4 | 69 | .454 | 209 | 266 | 8th, Atlantic | 2019 | — | Did not qualify | | | |
| 2019–20 | 62 | 31 | 20 | — | 6 | 5 | 73 | .589 | 171 | 173 | 4th, Atlantic | 2020 | — | Season cancelled due to the COVID-19 pandemic | | | |
| 2020–21 | 24 | 14 | 9 | — | 1 | 0 | 29 | .604 | 82 | 74 | 2nd, Atlantic | 2021 | — | No playoffs were held | | | |
| 2021–22 | 72 | 32 | 32 | — | 6 | 2 | 72 | .500 | 205 | 225 | 7th, Atlantic | 2022 | — | Did not qualify | | | |
| 2022–23 | 72 | 35 | 26 | — | 4 | 7 | 81 | .563 | 227 | 215 | 5th, Atlantic | 2023 | W, 2–0, SPR | W, 3–1, PRO | L, 0–3, HER | — | — |
| 2023–24 | 72 | 34 | 28 | — | 7 | 3 | 78 | .542 | 204 | 219 | 5th, Atlantic | 2024 | W, 2–1, CHA | W, 3–1, PRO | L, 0–3, HER | — | — |
| 2024–25 | 72 | 30 | 33 | — | 7 | 2 | 69 | .479 | 199 | 234 | 7th, Atlantic | 2025 | Did not qualify | | | | |
| 2025–26 | 72 | 26 | 38 | — | 5 | 3 | 60 | .417 | 190 | 253 | 8th, Atlantic | 2026 | Did not qualify | | | | |

== Players ==
=== Current roster ===
Updated November 15, 2026.

| No. | Nat | Player | Pos | S/G | Age | Acquired | Birthplace | Contract |
|---|---|---|---|---|---|---|---|---|
| 76 | (Canada) | Nathan Aspinall | LW | L | 20 | 2026 | Markham, Ontario | Rangers |
| 88 | (Canada) | Jacob Battaglia | RW | L | 20 | 2026 | Mississauga, Ontario | Rangers |
| 29 | (Canada) | Cole Beaudoin | C | L | 20 | 2026 | Ottawa, Ontario | Rangers |
| 21 | (Sweden) | Anton Blidh (A) | LW | L | 31 | 2023 | Mölnlycke, Sweden | Rangers |
| 25 | (Canada) | Dennis Cholowski | D | L | 28 | 2026 | Langley, British Columbia | Rangers |
| 2 | (United States) | Marc Del Gaizo (C) | D | L | 27 | 2026 | Basking Ridge, New Jersey | Rangers |
| 38 | (United States) | Jackson Dorrington | D | L | 22 | 2025 | North Reading, Massachusetts | Rangers |
| 37 | (Canada) | Justin Dowling (A) | C | L | 36 | 2025 | Cochrane, Alberta | Rangers |
| 45 | (United States) | Drew Fortescue | D | L | 21 | 2026 | Pearl River, New York | Rangers |
| 4 | (United States) | Ethan Frisch | D | R | 26 | 2026 | Moorhead, Minnesota | Wolf Pack |
| 24 | (Canada) | Liam Greentree | RW | L | 20 | 2026 | Oshawa, Ontario | Rangers |
| 6 | (Canada) | Vincent Iorio | D | R | 24 | 2026 | Coquitlam, British Columbia | Rangers |
| 59 | (United States) | Zakary Karpa | C | L | 24 | 2025 | Greenwich, Connecticut | Wolf Pack |
| 37 | (Canada) | Anthony Kehrer | D | R | 24 | 2026 | Winnipeg, Manitoba | Wolf Pack |
| 26 | (United States) | Brody Lamb | RW | R | 23 | 2026 | Rochester, Minnesota | Rangers |
| 18 | (Canada) | Bryce McConnell-Barker | C | L | 22 | 2023 | London, Ontario | Rangers |
| 3 | (United States) | Cooper Moore | D | L | 25 | 2025 | Greenwich, Connecticut | Wolf Pack |
| 15 | (Canada) | Justin Nachbaur | LW | L | 26 | 2026 | Cross Lake, Manitoba | Wolf Pack |
| 13 | (Finland) | Juuso Parssinen | C | L | 25 | 2025 | Hämeenlinna, Finland | Rangers |
| 28 | (Canada) | Dylan Roobroeck | C | L | 22 | 2024 | London, Ontario | Rangers |
| 40 | (Sweden) | Arvid Söderblom | G | L | 27 | 2026 | Gothenburg, Sweden | Rangers |
| 5 | (United States) | Carey Terrance | C | L | 21 | 2025 | Akwesasne, New York | Rangers |
| 35 | (Canada) | Callum Tung | G | L | 22 | 2025 | Port Moody, British Columbia | Rangers |
| 17 | (Finland) | Urho Vaakanainen | D | L | 27 | 2026 | Joensuu, Finland | Rangers |
| 67 | (Canada) | Lucas Vanroboys | C | R | 27 | 2026 | Thamesville, Ontario | Wolf Pack |

=== Team captains ===
- Ken Gernander, 1997–05
- Craig Weller, 2005–07
- Andrew Hutchinson, 2007–08
- Greg Moore, 2008–09
- Dane Byers, 2009–10
- Wade Redden, 2011–12
- Aaron Johnson, 2013–14
- Ryan Bourque, 2015–16
- Mat Bodie, 2016–17
- Joe Whitney, 2017–18
- Cole Schneider, 2018
- Steven Fogarty, 2019–20
- Vincent LoVerde, 2021
- Jonny Brodzinski, 2021–24
- Casey Fitzgerald, 2024–26
- Marc Del Gaizo, 2026–present

=== Retired numbers ===
Hartford Wolf Pack retired numbers
| No. | Player | Position | Career | No. retirement |
|---|---|---|---|---|
| 12 | Ken Gernander | RW | 1997–2005 | October 8, 2005 |

The Wolf Pack have honored a number of former Hartford Whalers players by hanging their jerseys in the rafters, without formally retiring their numbers. In 2006, Ulf Samuelsson (#5), Ron Francis (#10) and Kevin Dineen (#11) were honored by the team in this way, joining Rick Ley (#2), Gordie Howe (#9) and John Mckenzie (#19) whose numbers had been previously retired by the Whalers.

=== American Hockey League Hall of Famers ===
AHL Hall of Fame Honored Members
| Name | Seasons | Induction Year |
|---|---|---|
| Chris Bourque | 2014-15 (player) | 2026 |
| Ken Gernander | 1997-2005 (player); 2005-07 (asst. coach); 2007-17 (head coach) | 2013 |
| Alexandre Giroux | 2003-06 (player) | 2026 |
| Jean-Francois Labbe | 1998-2001 (player) | 2016 |
| John Paddock | 1999-2002 (head coach) | 2010 |
| Brad Smyth | 1997-2002, 2005-06 (player) | 2019 |

=== Notable alumni ===
The following players have played both 100 games in Hartford and 100 games in the National Hockey League:

- Artem Anisimov
- Derek Armstrong
- Drew Bannister
- Matt Beleskey
- Jonny Brodzinski
- Jason Dawe
- Nigel Dawes
- Dan Girardi
- Ryan Graves
- Micheal Haley
- Chad Johnson
- Zac Jones
- Jason LaBarbera
- Tomas Kloucek
- Lauri Korpikoski
- Oscar Lindberg
- Jamie Lundmark
- J. T. Miller
- Al Montoya
- Dominic Moore
- Mike Mottau
- Garth Murray
- P. A. Parenteau
- Corey Potter
- Dale Purinton
- Tom Pyatt
- Wade Redden
- Michael Sauer
- P.J. Stock
- Cam Talbot
- Brent Thompson
- Dale Weise
- Craig Weller

== Team records ==
Single season
Goals: 50, Brad Smyth (2000–01)
Assists: 69, Derek Armstrong (2000–01)
Points: 101, Derek Armstrong (2000–01)
Penalty Minutes: 415, Dale Purinton (1999–2000)
GAA: 1.59, Jason LaBarbera (2003–04)
SV%: .936, Jason LaBarbera (2003–04)
Shutouts: 13, Jason LaBarbera (2003–04)
Goaltending Wins: 34, Jason LaBarbera (2003–04)
Career
Goals: 184, Brad Smyth
Assists: 204, Derek Armstrong
Points: 365, Brad Smyth
Penalty Minutes: 1240, Dale Purinton
Shutouts: 21, Jason LaBarbera
Goaltending Wins: 91, Jason LaBarbera
Games: 599, Ken Gernander
