= Saint John Flames =

Ice hockey team

- City: Saint John, New Brunswick
- League: American Hockey League
- Founded: 1977
- Operated: 1993–2003
- Home arena: Harbour Station
- Colours: Red, white, gold, black
- Affiliates: Calgary Flames

Franchise history
- 1977–1987: Maine Mariners
- 1987–1993: Utica Devils
- 1993–2003: Saint John Flames
- 2005–2007: Omaha Ak-Sar-Ben Knights
- 2007–2009: Quad City Flames
- 2009–2014: Abbotsford Heat
- 2014–2015: Adirondack Flames
- 2015–2022: Stockton Heat
- 2022–Present: Calgary Wranglers

Championships
- Division titles: 2: 1997–98, 2000–01
- Conference titles: 2: 1997–98, 2000–01
- Calder Cups: 1: 2000–01

The Saint John Flames were a Canadian ice hockey team in the American Hockey League from 1993 to 2003 in Saint John, New Brunswick, Canada. The Calgary Flames bought and relocated the Utica Devils, to be their AHL affiliate.

== History ==
The Saint John Flames won the 2001 Calder Cup Championship on home ice at Harbour Station on May 28, 2001 against the Wilkes-Barre/Scranton Penguins, the farm team of the Pittsburgh Penguins. The Flames won the series four games to two with a final score of 1–0. The Flames also played in the Calder Cup Finals in 1998, losing to the Philadelphia Phantoms. With their 2001 victory, the Saint John Flames became the second AHL team based in New Brunswick to win the Calder Cup, the first being the New Brunswick Hawks of Moncton in 1982 against the Binghamton Whalers. This came after other AHL teams based in New Brunswick tried to compete for the cup and lost.

The franchise suspended operations after the 2002–03 season and became dormant for two seasons. In 2005, the franchise was reactivated and then relocated several times playing as the Omaha Ak-Sar-Ben Knights from 2005–2007, the Quad City Flames from 2007–2009, the Abbotsford Heat from 2009–2014, the Adirondack Flames for the 2014–15 season, and then the Stockton Heat starting in the 2015–16 season as part of a new Pacific Division.

When the franchise went dormant, the St. John's Maple Leafs were left as the last remaining Atlantic Canadian AHL club for one season as the Toronto Maple Leafs moved their affiliate to Toronto in 2005. The AHL would not return to Atlantic Canada until 2011 with the St. John's IceCaps. The Saint John market is currently served by the QMJHL's Saint John Sea Dogs.

The Saint John Flames originally used a logo of a stylized red and yellow flame that closely resembled that of the Calgary Flames, with a hockey stick and the word "FLAMES" in red letters at the bottom. In 2000, the team's logo was changed to that of a fire-breathing dragon, with the colours being red and orange. This was a rare instance of an AHL team not having the same basic logo (albeit with some modifications) as its NHL affiliate in terms of having the same name. Even the Fredericton Express, in a city not far from Saint John and in the same province, used a logo closely resembling that of one of its two NHL affiliates, the Quebec Nordiques (the other affiliate of the Express was the Vancouver Canucks).

== Season-by-season results ==
Statistics source:

=== Regular season ===
Season	GP	W	L	T	OL	Pts.	GF	GA	Result
1993–94	80	37	33	10	—	84	304	305	2nd, Atlantic
1994–95	80	27	40	13	—	67	250	286	4th, Atlantic
1995-96	80	35	30	11	4	85	272	264	2nd, Atlantic
1996–97	80	28	36	13	3	72	237	299	2nd, Canadian
1997–98	80	43	24	13	0	99	231	201	1st, Atlantic
1998–99	80	31	40	8	1	71	238	296	4th, Atlantic
1999–00	80	32	32	11	5	80	267	283	2nd, Atlantic
2000–01	80	44	24	7	5	100	269	210	1st, Canadian
2001–02	80	29	34	13	4	75	182	202	5th, Canadian
2002–03	80	32	41	6	1	71	203	223	4th, Canadian

=== Playoffs ===
Season	1st round	2nd round	3rd round	Finals
1993–94	L, 3–4, Moncton	—	—	—
1994–95	L, 1–4, P.E.I.	—	—	—
1995–96	W, 3–1, St. John's	W, 4–1, Fredericton	L, 3–4, Portland	—
1996–97	L, 2–3, Hamilton	—	—	—
1997–98	W, 3–1, St. John's	W, 4–2, Portland	W, 4–1, Hartford	L, 2–4, Philadelphia
1998–99	W, 3–0, Lowell	L, 0–4, Fredericton	—	—
1999–00	L, 0–3, Lowell	—	—	—
2000–01	W, 3–0, Portland	W, 4–1, Quebec	W, 4–1, Providence	W, 4–2, W.B.S.
2001–02	Out of Playoffs			
2002–03	Out of Playoffs			

Career Leaders

Goals: 89 (Ladislav Kohn, 1994–03)

Assists: 152 (Marty Murray, 1995–01)

Points: 230 (Marty Murray, 1995–01)

PIM: 851 (Derick McKinnon, 1994–98)

Chris Dingman

Affiliates

- Calgary Flames (1993-2003)

== See also ==
- List of ice hockey teams in New Brunswick
