= TD Station =

Sports complex in Saint John, New Brunswick

Coordinates: 45°16′34″N 66°3′51″W

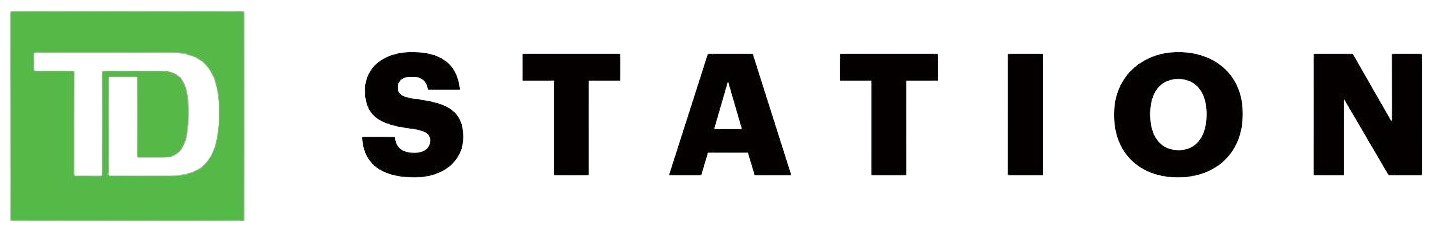

- Location within New Brunswick Location within Canada
- Former names: Harbour Station (1993–2019)
- Location: 99 Station Street; Saint John, New Brunswick; E2L 4X4
- Capacity: 6,308 (seated, hockey); 6,603 (seated, basketball); 8,100 (concert)
- Surface: 200' X 85'

Construction
- Groundbreaking: Summer 1992
- Opened: October 1993
- Renovated: 2005

Tenants
- Saint John Flames (AHL) (1993–2003); Saint John Sea Dogs (QMJHL) (2005–present); Saint John Mill Rats/Riptide (NBL Canada) (2011–2019)

TD Station, formerly known as Harbour Station, is an arena located in the uptown area of Saint John, New Brunswick, Canada. The arena is the home of the Saint John Sea Dogs of the Quebec Maritimes Junior Hockey League. It was once the home of the American Hockey League's Saint John Flames from 1993 until their relocation in 2003 and the Saint John Riptide (originally known as the Mill Rats) of the National Basketball League of Canada from 2011 to 2019. The arena opened in October 1993 to a gala and a concert by Aerosmith which was attended by over 7,000 people, a record that was broken in 2008 by Elton John who brought in 8,100 fans. Since opening, the arena has hosted concerts, hockey, basketball, figure skating, and a number of trade shows.

The arena sits on land that used to be part of Saint John Harbour, and partly derives its name from the city's former Union Station passenger railway terminal. The station was located on the site and was used by both CNR and CPR trains, until it was demolished to make way for the Saint John Throughway as part of an urban redevelopment plan in the early 1970s. TD Station is connected by Saint John's pedway system — the Inside Connection — to the major uptown malls, hotels, parking garages and offices, allowing patrons to park their vehicles away from the stadium and reach it on foot without going outdoors.

In 2019, the arena gained a sponsor with the Toronto-Dominion Bank and Harbour Station was renamed TD Station.

== Design ==
TD Station features two levels of seating, an 'upper bowl' and a 'lower bowl'. There are 11 rows of seating in the lower bowl level, 9-12 rows in the upper bowl level, with approximately 16 seats in each section in each level. TD Station has 13 luxury sky boxes, which were added before the 2005–2006 season. They also have the Alpine Room which is a private club located at the top of TD Station and has a lounge-type atmosphere with a full-service bar and food service. TD Station features an open concourse so it enables fans walking around, or in line for concessions to still view the game.

Seating capacity varies for different events at TD Station, with 6,307 seats available for hockey games, and 6,603 seats for basketball games. Seating capacity for concerts may range between 1,400 and around 8,100.

== Past events ==
In the past, the arena has hosted:

- The Skate Canada Championships in 1995.
- The 1997 AHL All-Star Game.
- The 1998 & 2001 AHL Calder Cup Finals.
- The 1998 World Junior Figure Skating Championships.
- The 1999 men's and women's World Curling Championships.
- The 2002 East Coast Music Awards.
- The 2006 Canadian Country Music Awards.
- 2013 Skate Canada International
- The 2014 Women's World Curling Championships
- The 2019 CHL Canada/Russia Series
- The 2022 Memorial Cup

TD Station has also hosted one NHL pre-season game featuring the Calgary Flames, and the Hartford Whalers on Sunday, September 17, 1995. and two NBA pre-season games. The arena was a stand-in for the old Pacific Coliseum in Vancouver during filming of the Canada-Russia '72 miniseries.
