= Kentucky Thoroughblades =

Former professional minor league ice hockey team in Lexington, Kentucky

- City: Lexington, Kentucky
- League: American Hockey League
- Operated: 1996–2001
- Home arena: Rupp Arena
- Colors: Spruce, plum and white
- Affiliates: San Jose Sharks, New York Islanders

Franchise history
- 1996–2001: Kentucky Thoroughblades
- 2001–2006: Cleveland Barons
- 2006–2015: Worcester Sharks
- 2015–present: San Jose Barracuda

Championships
- Division titles: 2 (1999–00, 2000–01)

The Kentucky Thoroughblades were a minor professional ice hockey team in the American Hockey League, who existed from 1996 to 2001. The Thoroughblades were based in Lexington, Kentucky, playing home games at Rupp Arena. The Thoroughblades were an affiliate of the NHL's San Jose Sharks.

== History ==
The Thoroughblades were the first professional ice hockey team to play in Lexington, Kentucky. Initially, attendance was high. During the 1997–98 season, Kentucky averaged 7,847 fans per game, despite a losing record on ice. Attendance decreased in the next three seasons, even with two consecutive division championships. In their final season, attendance averaged only 4,461 fans per game.

In 2001, the team moved to Cleveland, Ohio, becoming the Cleveland Barons. In 2006, the team then moved to Worcester, Massachusetts, becoming the Worcester Sharks. In 2015, the team moved to San Jose, California to become the San Jose Barracuda.

The void in Lexington was replaced in 2001, by another minor league hockey team, the Lexington Men O' War of the ECHL, lasting one season in Lexington.

== Season-by-season results ==
=== Regular season ===
Season	Games	Won	Lost	Tied	OTL	Points	Goals for	Goals against	Standing
1996–97	80	36	35	9	0	81	278	284	3rd, Mid-Atlantic
1997–98	80	29	39	9	3	70	241	278	3rd, Mid-Atlantic
1998–99	80	44	26	7	3	98	272	220	2nd, Mid-Atlantic
1999–00	80	42	25	9	4	97	250	211	1st, Mid-Atlantic
2000–01	80	42	25	12	1	97	273	212	1st, South

=== Playoffs ===
Season	1st round	2nd round	3rd round	Finals
1996–97	L, 1–3, Hershey	—	—	—
1997–98	L, 0–3, Hershey	—	—	—
1998–99	W, 3–2, Hershey	L, 3–4, Philadelphia	—	—
1999–00	W, 3–1, Louisville	L, 1–4, Hershey	—	—
2000–01	L, 0–3, Hershey	—	—	—

=== Notable Alumni ===
- Miikka Kiprusoff
- Johan Hedberg
- Evgeni Nabokov
- Vesa Toskala
- Jonathan Cheechoo
- Dan Boyle
- Zdeno Chara
- Andy Lundbohm
- Matt Bradley
- Garrett Burnett

=== American Hockey League Hall of Famers ===
AHL Hall of Fame Honored Members
Name	Seasons	Induction Year
Roy Sommer	1998-2001 (head coach)	2024

=== Career leaders ===
- Goals: 88 (Steve Guolla, 1996–99)
- Assists: 132 (Steve Guolla, 1996–99)
- Points: 220 (Steve Guolla, 1996–99)
- PIM: 692 (Garrett Burnett, 1998–00)
