= 2005 Calder Cup playoffs =

North American ice hockey tournament

Tournament details
- Dates: April 19 – June 10, 2005
- Teams: 16

Final positions
- Champions: Philadelphia Phantoms
- Runners-up: Chicago Wolves

Tournament statistics
- Scoring leader(s): Jeff Carter (Phantoms) (23 points)

Awards
- MVP: Antero Niittymaki (Phantoms)

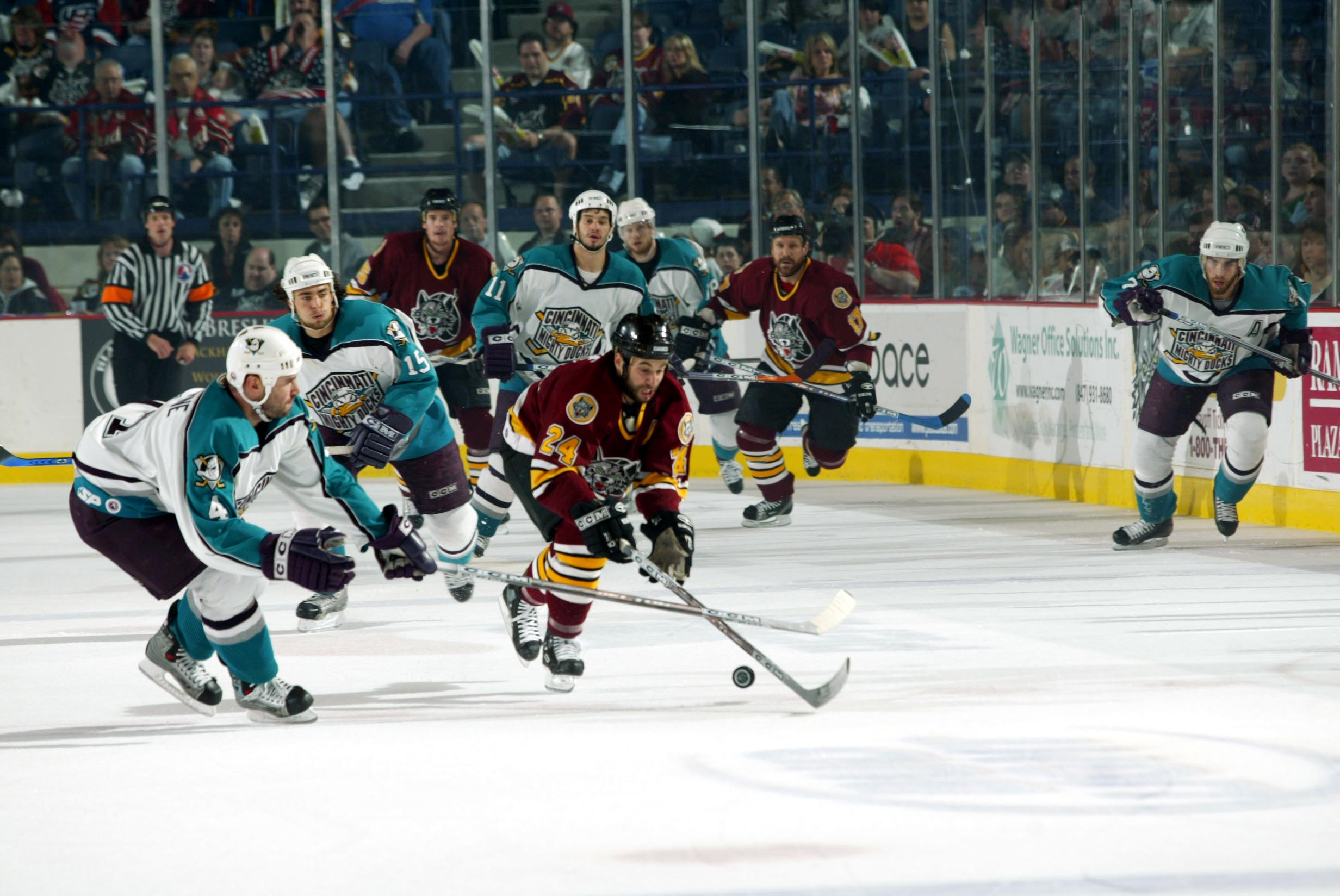
The Mighty Ducks vs Timberwolves, 13 May 2005

The 2005 Calder Cup playoffs of the American Hockey League began on April 19, 2005. The sixteen teams that qualified, eight from each conference, played best-of-7 series for division semifinals, finals and conference finals. The conference champions played a best-of-7 series for the Calder Cup. The Calder Cup Final ended on June 10, 2005 with the Philadelphia Phantoms defeating the Chicago Wolves four games to none to win the second Calder Cup in team history. Philadelphia's Antero Niittymaki won the Jack A. Butterfield Trophy as playoff MVP.

Philadelphia set an AHL record by winning 11 consecutive home games in a single playoff. By playing the postseason in the Wachovia Center, the team also managed to set postseason attendance records, with 20,103 spectators in the cup-clinching game 4 against Chicago.

As the National Hockey League was in the midst of a lockout that canceled that league's entire 2004–05 season, the 2005 playoffs featured a higher number of players from the NHL.

== Playoff seeds ==
After the 2004–05 AHL regular season, 16 teams qualified for the playoffs. The top four teams from each division qualified for the playoffs. The Rochester Americans were the Western Conference regular season champions as well as the Macgregor Kilpatrick Trophy winners with the best overall regular season record. The Manchester Monarchs were the Eastern Conference regular season champions.

=== Eastern Conference ===
==== Atlantic Division ====
1. Manchester Monarchs – Eastern Conference regular season champions, 110 points
2. Hartford Wolf Pack – 106 points
3. Lowell Lock Monsters – 100 points
4. Providence Bruins – 90 points

==== East Division ====
1. Binghamton Senators – 106 points
2. Philadelphia Phantoms – 103 points
3. Norfolk Admirals – 93 points
4. Wilkes-Barre/Scranton Penguins – 92 points

=== Western Conference ===
==== North Division ====
1. Rochester Americans – Western Conference regular season champions; Macgregor Kilpatrick Trophy winners, 112 points
2. St. John's Maple Leafs – 98 points
3. Manitoba Moose – 98 points
4. Hamilton Bulldogs – 89 points

==== West Division ====
1. Chicago Wolves – 105 points
2. Milwaukee Admirals – 103 points
3. Cincinnati Mighty Ducks – 93 points
4. Houston Aeros – 92 points

== Bracket ==
Division Semifinals; April 19–May 1	Division Finals; May 4–14
A1	Manchester	2
A4	Providence	4
A4	Providence	4
Atlantic Division
A3	Lowell	1
A2	Hartford	2
A3	Lowell	4
Eastern Conference
E1	Binghamton	2
E4	Wilkes-Barre/Scranton	4
E4	Wilkes-Barre/Scranton	1
East Division
E2	Philadelphia	4
E2	Philadelphia	4
E3	Norfolk	2
N1	Rochester	4
N4	Hamilton	0
N1	Rochester	1
North Division
N3	Manitoba	4
N2	St. John's	1
N3	Manitoba	4
Western Conference
W1	Chicago	4
W4	Houston	1
W1	Chicago	4
West Division
W3	Cincinnati	1
W2	Milwaukee	3
W3	Cincinnati	4

Conference Finals; May 19–29
A4	Providence	2
E2	Philadelphia	4
N3	Manitoba	0
W1	Chicago	4

Calder Cup Final; June 2–10
E2	Philadelphia	4
W1	Chicago	0

In each round the higher seed receives home ice advantage, meaning they can play a maximum of four home games if the series reaches seven games. There is no set series format for each series due to arena scheduling conflicts and travel considerations.

== Division Semifinals ==
Note 1: All times are in Eastern Time (UTC−4).
Note 2: Game times in italics signify games to be played only if necessary.
Note 3: Home team is listed first.

=== Eastern Conference ===
==== Atlantic Division ====
===== (A1) Manchester Monarchs vs. (A4) Providence Bruins =====
April 22	Manchester Monarchs	1 – 5	Providence Bruins	Verizon Wireless Arena
No scoring		First period	Ben Guite (1) - 2:42; Kevin Dallman (1) - 7:20; Dan LaCouture (1) - 7:30; Tomas Kurka (1) - pp - 19:49
11:53 - George Parros (1)		Second period	No scoring
No scoring		Third period	Tomas Kurka (2) - 4:53
Mathieu Garon 6 saves / 9 shots Adam Hauser 16 saves / 18 shots		Goalie stats	Hannu Toivonen 30 saves / 31 shots

April 23	Manchester Monarchs	4 – 2	Providence Bruins	Verizon Wireless Arena
10:04 - Dustin Brown (1); 12:02 - pp - Mike Cammalleri (1)		First period	Andy Hilbert (1) - 7:29; Pat Leahy (1) - 10:32
No scoring		Second period	No scoring
12:11 - Noah Clarke (1); 19:54 - sh - en - Chris Schmidt (1)		Third period	No scoring
Mathieu Garon 21 saves / 23 shots		Goalie stats	Hannu Toivonen 30 saves / 33 shots

April 25	Providence Bruins	6 – 3	Manchester Monarchs	Dunkin' Donuts Center
5:06 - sh - Pat Leahy (2); 7:42 - Martin Samuelsson (1); 11:59 - Andy Hilbert (2)		First period	Dave Steckel (1) - pp - 19:17
5:47 - pp - Keith Aucoin (1); 12:44 - pp - Kevin Dallman (2)		Second period	No scoring
19:26 - en - Andy Hilbert (3)		Third period	Dustin Brown (2) - 1:57; Brad Smyth (1) - pp - 5:51
Hannu Toivonen 27 saves / 30 shots		Goalie stats	Mathieu Garon 25 saves / 30 shots Adam Hauser 3 saves / 3 shots

April 27	Providence Bruins	2 – 3	Manchester Monarchs	Dunkin' Donuts Center
14:22 - Tomas Kurka (3)		First period	Brad Smyth (2) - pp - 2:08; Dustin Brown (3) - 15:54
No scoring		Second period	No scoring
12:20 - Milan Jurcina (1)		Third period	Jason Holland (1) - 19:12
Hannu Toivonen 24 saves / 27 shots		Goalie stats	Mathieu Garon 24 saves / 26 shots

April 28	Manchester Monarchs	2 – 4	Providence Bruins	Verizon Wireless Arena
No scoring		First period	No scoring
12:19 - Dustin Brown (4); 17:30 - Dustin Brown (5)		Second period	Brad Boyes (1) - 7:29; Keith Aucoin (2) - pp - 9:55
No scoring		Third period	Kevin Dallman (3) - pp - 1:23; Patrice Bergeron (1) - en - 19:54
Mathieu Garon 27 saves / 29 shots		Goalie stats	Hannu Toivonen 29 saves / 32 shots

April 30	Providence Bruins	3 – 1	Manchester Monarchs	Dunkin' Donuts Center
No scoring		First period	Troy Milam (1) - pp - 4:04
No scoring		Second period	No scoring
4:34 - pp - Patrice Bergeron (2); 16:00 - Brad Boyes (2); 19:52 - en - Jayme Filipowicz (1)		Third period	No scoring
Hannu Toivonen 31 saves / 32 shots		Goalie stats	Mathieu Garon 37 saves / 39 shots

Providence won series 4 – 2

===== (A2) Hartford Wolf Pack vs. (A3) Lowell Lock Monsters =====
April 21	Hartford Wolf Pack	5 – 2	Lowell Lock Monsters	Hartford Civic Center
2:07 - Dominic Moore (1)		First period	No scoring
12:21 - pp - Alexandre Giroux (1); 16:44 - Jeff Hamilton (1)		Second period	Ryan Bayda (1) - 1:42
1:39 - pp - Alexandre Giroux (2); 19:46 - en - Ryan Hollweg (1)		Third period	Chad LaRose (1) - pp - 5:03
Jason LaBarbera 39 saves / 41 shots		Goalie stats	Cam Ward 24 saves / 28 shots

April 23	Hartford Wolf Pack	1 – 2	Lowell Lock Monsters	Hartford Civic Center
No scoring		First period	Chuck Kobasew (1) - sh - 4:22
7:52 - Jeff Hamilton (2)		Second period	No scoring
No scoring		Third period	Ryan Bayda (2) - pp - 9:26
Jason LaBarbera 32 saves / 34 shots		Goalie stats	Cam Ward 28 saves / 29 shots

April 24	Lowell Lock Monsters	1 – 4	Hartford Wolf Pack	Tsongas Arena
No scoring		First period	Chad Wiseman (1) - 5:02
17:54 - Ryan Bayda (3)		Second period	Ken Gernander (3) - 5:18
No scoring		Third period	Alexandre Giroux (3) - 6:00; Jamie Lundmark (1) - en - 19:18
Cam Ward 25 saves / 28 shots		Goalie stats	Jason LaBarbera 32 saves / 33 shots

April 26	Lowell Lock Monsters	3 – 2	Hartford Wolf Pack	Tsongas Arena
16:33 - pp - Mike Zigomanis (1); 18:20 - Mike Zigomanis (2)		First period	No scoring
1:29 - pp - Gordie Dwyer (1)		Second period	Jeff Hamilton (3) - pp - 0:24; Jamie Lundmark (2) - 14:50
No scoring		Third period	No scoring
Cam Ward 21 saves / 23 shots		Goalie stats	Steve Valiquette 29 saves / 32 shots

April 28	Hartford Wolf Pack	2 – 3	Lowell Lock Monsters	Hartford Civic Center
9:26 - Garth Murray (1)		First period	No scoring
No scoring		Second period	Richie Regehr (1) - 16:45; Mike Zigomanis (3) - 17:02
18:45 - pp - Jeff Hamilton (3)		Third period	Eric Staal (1) - pp - 9:19
Jason LaBarbera 29 saves / 32 shots		Goalie stats	Cam Ward 37 saves / 39 shots

April 30	Lowell Lock Monsters	3 – 0	Hartford Wolf Pack	Tsongas Arena
No scoring		First period	No scoring
8:25 - pp - Chuck Kobasew (2); 15:04 - pp - Allan Rourke (1)		Second period	No scoring
18:05 - en - Chuck Kobasew (3)		Third period	No scoring
Cam Ward 40 saves / 40 shots		Goalie stats	Jason LaBarbera 41 saves / 43 shots

Lowell won series 4 – 2

==== East Division ====
===== (E1) Binghamton Senators vs. (E4) Wilkes-Barre/Scranton Penguins =====
April 22	Binghamton Senators	5 – 2	Wilkes-Barre/Scranton Penguins	Broome County Veterans Memorial Arena
2:03 - pp - Josh Langfeld (1); 8:22 - Jesse Fibiger (1)		First period	No scoring
16:48 - pp - Jason Spezza (1)		Second period	Matt Murley (1) - 1:44
2:53 - Antoine Vermette (1); 12:46 - Charlie Stephens (1)		Third period	Michel Ouellet (1) - 13:19
Ray Emery 33 saves / 35 shots		Goalie stats	Marc-Andre Fleury 24 saves / 29 shots

April 23	Binghamton Senators	4 – 2	Wilkes-Barre/Scranton Penguins	Broome County Veterans Memorial Arena
1:44 - Charlie Stephens (2)		First period	No scoring
No scoring		Second period	Kris Beech (1) - pp - 10:50
0:49 - Chris Neil (1); 5:06 - Charlie Stephens (3); 12:46 - Brandon Bochenski (1)		Third period	Erik Christensen (1) - 13:06
Ray Emery 29 saves / 31 shots		Goalie stats	Andy Chiodo 24 saves / 28 shots

April 25	Wilkes-Barre/Scranton Penguins	3 – 2	3OT	Binghamton Senators	Wachovia Arena at Casey Plaza
No scoring		First period		Christoph Schubert (1) - pp - 9:04
3:30 - pp - Shane Endicott (1); 10:27 - pp - Kris Beech (2)		Second period		Christoph Schubert (2) - pp - 15:11
No scoring		Third period		No scoring
12:26 - Colby Armstrong (1)		Overtime		No scoring
Andy Chiodo 42 saves / 44 shots		Goalie stats		Ray Emery 46 saves / 49 shots

April 27	Wilkes-Barre/Scranton Penguins	2 – 0	Binghamton Senators	Wachovia Arena at Casey Plaza
15:14 - pp - Matt Murley (2)		First period	No scoring
No scoring		Second period	No scoring
9:08 - Colby Armstrong (2)		Third period	No scoring
Andy Chiodo 23 saves / 23 shots		Goalie stats	Ray Emery 20 saves / 22 shots

April 29	Binghamton Senators	2 – 3	Wilkes-Barre/Scranton Penguins	Broome County Veterans Memorial Arena
10:06 - pp - Denis Hamel (1)		First period	No scoring
No scoring		Second period	Rob Scuderi (1) - pp - 1:19; Ryan VandenBussche (1) - 16:38
4:11 - pp - Josh Langfeld (2)		Third period	Ryan VandenBussche (2) - 4:45
Ray Emery 28 saves / 31 shots		Goalie stats	Andy Chiodo 28 saves / 30 shots

May 1	Wilkes-Barre/Scranton Penguins	2 – 1	Binghamton Senators	Wachovia Arena at Casey Plaza
No scoring		First period	No scoring
No scoring		Second period	Chris Kelly (1) - pp - 18:47
8:00 - pp - Kris Beech (3); 17:16 - pp - Michel Ouellet (2)		Third period	No scoring
Andy Chiodo 30 saves / 31 shots		Goalie stats	Ray Emery 16 saves / 18 shots

Wilkes-Barre/Scranton won series 4 – 2

===== (E2) Philadelphia Phantoms vs. (E3) Norfolk Admirals =====
April 22	Philadelphia Phantoms	3 – 1	Norfolk Admirals	Wachovia Center
No scoring		First period	No scoring
9:40 - Ben Stafford (1); 11:27 - pp - John Slaney (1); 19:07 - pp - Jon Sim (1)		Second period	Rene Bourque (1) - pp - 0:55
No scoring		Third period	No scoring
Antero Nittymaki 29 saves / 30 shots		Goalie stats	Craig Anderson 30 saves / 33 shots

April 23	Philadelphia Phantoms	3 – 0	Norfolk Admirals	Wachovia Center
No scoring		First period	No scoring
7:39 - Todd Fedoruk (1); 9:52 - Jeff Carter (1)		Second period	No scoring
19:53 - Ben Eager (1)		Third period	No scoring
Antero Nittymaki 32 saves / 32 shots		Goalie stats	Craig Anderson 26 saves / 29 shots

April 25	Norfolk Admirals	3 – 1	Philadelphia Phantoms	Norfolk Scope
12:50 - Jason Morgan (1)		First period	Josh Gratton (1) - 7:11
No scoring		Second period	No scoring
1:58 - Colin Fraser (1); 15:02 - Ajay Baines (1)		Third period	No scoring
Craig Anderson 30 saves / 31 shots		Goalie stats	Antero Nittymaki 31 saves / 34 shots

April 27	Norfolk Admirals	1 – 4	Philadelphia Phantoms	Norfolk Scope
No scoring		First period	R.J. Umberger (1) - 2:45
No scoring		Second period	Jeff Carter (2) - 14:07; Patrick Sharp (1) - 16:43
13:03 - pp - Jason Morgan (2)		Third period	Jeff Carter (3) - en - 18:31
Craig Anderson 36 saves / 39 shots		Goalie stats	Antero Nittymaki 40 saves / 41 shots

April 29	Norfolk Admirals	4 – 1	Philadelphia Phantoms	Norfolk Scope
Richard Seeley (1) - 10:27; James Wisniewski (1) - 14:36		First period	15:40 - pp - Jeff Carter (4)
No scoring		Second period	No scoring
Pavel Vorobiev (1) - 1:20; Pavel Vorobiev (2) - 5:05		Third period	No scoring
Craig Anderson 25 saves / 26 shots		Goalie stats	Antero Nittymaki 41 saves / 45 shots

May 1	Philadelphia Phantoms	4 – 2	Norfolk Admirals	Wachovia Center
Patrick Sharp (2) - 0:23		First period	No scoring
No scoring		Second period	5:01 - sh - Ajay Baines (2); 11:54 - pp - Ajay Baines (3)
Dennis Seidenberg (1) - 4:58; Mark Murphy (1) - 15:01; Eric Meloche (1) - en - 19:56		Third period	No scoring
Antero Nittymaki 28 saves / 30 shots		Goalie stats	Craig Anderson 25 saves / 28 shots

Philadelphia won series 4 – 2

=== Western Conference ===
==== North Division ====
===== (N1) Rochester Americans vs. (N4) Hamilton Bulldogs =====
April 20	Rochester Americans	3 – 1	Hamilton Bulldogs	Blue Cross Arena at the War Memorial
No scoring		First period	Antti Miettinen (1) - 15:56
No scoring		Second period	No scoring
9:16 - Norm Milley (1); 13:34 - Paul Gaustad (1); 16:33 - Paul Gaustad (2)		Third period	No scoring
Ryan Miller 25 saves / 26 shots		Goalie stats	Yann Danis 32 saves / 35 shots

April 22	Rochester Americans	2 – 1	Hamilton Bulldogs	Blue Cross Arena at the War Memorial
No scoring		First period	Chris Higgins (1) - 2:00
2:40 - pp - Paul Gaustad (3); 10:15 - Thomas Vanek (1)		Second period	No scoring
No scoring		Third period	No scoring
Ryan Miller 34 saves / 35 shots		Goalie stats	Yann Danis 21 saves / 23 shots

April 24	Hamilton Bulldogs	3 – 4	Rochester Americans	Copps Coliseum
1:15 - Chris Higgins (2); 3:07 - Chris Higgins (3); 8:37 - Jason Ward (1)		First period	Paul Gaustad (4) - 6:51
No scoring		Second period	No scoring
No scoring		Third period	Jiri Novotny (1) - 8:15; Brandon Smith (1) - 13:20; Jiri Novotny (2) - 16:40
Yann Danis 26 saves / 30 shots		Goalie stats	Ryan Miller 26 saves / 29 shots

April 26	Hamilton Bulldogs	4 – 5	Rochester Americans	Copps Coliseum
No scoring		First period	Derek Roy (1) - pp - 9:23
11:24 - pp - Tomas Plekanec (1); 15:54 - Tomas Plekanec (2)		Second period	Jeff Jillson (1) - pp - 2:39
4:31 - Jason Ward (2); 19:31 - Ron Hainsey (1)		Third period	Chris Taylor (1) - 5:46; Derek Roy (2) - 16:59; Thomas Vanek (2) - en - 18:54
Yann Danis 30 saves / 34 shots		Goalie stats	Ryan Miller 28 saves / 32 shots

Rochester won series 4 – 0

===== (N2) St. John's Maple Leafs vs. (N3) Manitoba Moose =====
April 20	St. John's Maple Leafs	3 – 5	Manitoba Moose	Mile One Stadium
No scoring		First period	No scoring
17:46 - pp - Colin Murphy (1)		Second period	Kevin Bieksa (1) - 8:34; Lee Goren (1) - 11:12; Ryan Kesler (1) - 19:41
1:29 - pp - David Ling (1); 9:32 - Kyle Wellwood (1)		Third period	Lee Goren (2) - pp - 13:02; Josh Green (1) - en - 19:42
Mikael Tellqvist 28 saves / 32 shots		Goalie stats	Wade Flaherty 29 saves / 32 shots

April 22	St. John's Maple Leafs	6 – 1	Manitoba Moose	Mile One Stadium
6:42 - Brett Engelhardt (1); 19:42 - pp - Kyle Wellwood (2)		First period	Danny Groulx (1) - 18:22
9:54 - Jason MacDonald (1); 18:46 - Matt Stajan (1)		Second period	No scoring
13:14 - Matt Stajan (2); 14:43 - Brad Leeb (1)		Third period	No scoring
Mikael Tellqvist 27 saves / 28 shots		Goalie stats	Wade Flaherty 37 saves / 43 shots

April 25	Manitoba Moose	5 – 2	St. John's Maple Leafs	MTS Centre
1:19 - Ryan Kesler (2); 10:07 - Lee Goren (3); 11:38 - Jimmy Roy (1); 12:46 - Josh Green (2)		First period	No scoring
3:04 - Nathan Smith (1)		Second period	Jason MacDonald (2) - pp - 16:51
No scoring		Third period	No scoring
Wade Flaherty 22 saves / 24 shots		Goalie stats	Mikael Tellqvist 6 saves / 10 shots Jean-Sebastien Aubin 22 saves / 23 shots

April 27	Manitoba Moose	3 – 2	OT	St. John's Maple Leafs	MTS Centre
8:47 - Nathan Smith (2)		First period		Clarke Wilm (1) - 13:47
No scoring		Second period		No scoring
12:11 - Josh Green (3)		Third period		Clarke Wilm (2) - 0:16
2:35 - pp - Lee Goren (4)		First overtime period		No scoring
Wade Flaherty 20 saves / 22 shots		Goalie stats		Mikael Tellqvist 37 saves / 40 shots

April 29	Manitoba Moose	4 – 0	St. John's Maple Leafs	MTS Centre
Jesse Schultz (1) - 4:50; Lee Goren (5) - 7:47		First period	No scoring
Jeff Heerema (1) - pp - 19:11		Second period	No scoring
Jeff Heerema (2) - en - 19:05		Third period	No scoring
Wade Flaherty 22 saves / 22 shots		Goalie stats	Mikael Tellqvist 35 saves / 38 shots

Manitoba won series 4 – 1

==== West Division ====
===== (W1) Chicago Wolves vs. (W4) Houston Aeros =====
April 19	Chicago Wolves	4 – 1	Houston Aeros	Allstate Arena
5:23 - Stephen Weiss (1)		First period	No scoring
15:17 - Brad Larsen (1)		Second period	Kyle Wanvig (1) - 8:15
2:40 - Brad Larsen (2); 13:30 - Karl Stewart (1)		Third period	No scoring
Kari Lehtonen 22 saves / 23 shots		Goalie stats	Josh Harding 36 saves / 40 shots

April 21	Chicago Wolves	1 – 2	OT	Houston Aeros	Allstate Arena
No scoring		First period		Mark Cullen (1) - pp - 8:34
No scoring		Second period		No scoring
10:37 - Joe Corvo (1)		Third period		No scoring
No scoring		overtime period		Mikko Koivu (1) - 3:20
Kari Lehtonen 31 saves / 33 shots		Goalie stats		Mike Smith 33 saves / 34 shots

April 23	Houston Aeros	0 – 1	Chicago Wolves	Toyota Center
No scoring		First period	No scoring
No scoring		Second period	Tommi Santala (1) - 19:15
No scoring		Third period	No scoring
Mike Smith 31 saves / 32 shots		Goalie stats	Kari Lehtonen 25 saves / 25 shots

April 24	Houston Aeros	1 – 2	Chicago Wolves	Toyota Center
No scoring		First period	J.P. Vigier (1) - 14:42
No scoring		Second period	No scoring
17:20 - Matt Foy (1)		Third period	Steve Maltais (1) - pp - 15:38
Mike Smith 25 saves / 27 shots		Goalie stats	Kari Lehtonen 34 saves / 35 shots

April 26	Houston Aeros	3 – 5	Chicago Wolves	Toyota Center
Junior Lessard (1) - 11:04		First period	16:31 - pp - Cory Larose (1)
Zbynek Michalek (1) - pp - 0:24; Rickard Wallin (1) - 7:57		Second period	11:32 - pp - Tommi Santala (2); 11:55 - Kip Brennan (1)
No scoring		Third period	18:10 - Brian Maloney (1); 19:18 - en - Derek MacKenzie (1)
Josh Harding 31 saves / 35 shots		Goalie stats	Kari Lehtonen 26 saves / 29 shots

Chicago won series 4 – 1

===== (W2) Milwaukee Admirals vs. (W3) Cincinnati Mighty Ducks =====
April 20	Milwaukee Admirals	4 – 2	Cincinnati Mighty Ducks	Bradley Center
11:05 - pp - Simon Gamache (1); 17:56 - pp - Simon Gamache (2); 18:31 - pp - Ryan Suter (1)		First period	Joffrey Lupul (1) - 6:08
3:25 - Simon Gamache (3)		Second period	Dustin Penner (1) - 18:11
No scoring		Third period	No scoring
Brian Finley 27 saves / 29 shots		Goalie stats	Frederic Cassivi 15 saves / 19 shots

April 22	Cincinnati Mighty Ducks	4 – 3	2OT	Milwaukee Admirals	Cincinnati Gardens
No scoring		First period		15:27 - pp - Paul Brown (1)
Stanislav Chistov (1) - pp - 15:33; Zenon Konopka (1) - pp - 18:02		Second period		No scoring
Joffrey Lupul (2) - 11:04		Third period		6:24 - pp - Scottie Upshall (1); 15:09 - pp - Scottie Upshall (2)
Joel Stepp (1) - 4:05		Second overtime period		No scoring
Frederic Cassivi 36 saves / 39 shots		Goalie stats		Brian Finley 41 saves / 45 shots

April 23	Milwaukee Admirals	3 – 2	OT	Cincinnati Mighty Ducks	Bradley Center
Darren Haydar (1) - 11:40		First period		12:54 - Chris Kunitz (1); 16:36 - pp - Zenon Konopka (2)
No scoring		Second period		No scoring
Timofei Shishkanov (1) - pp - 11:36		Third period		No scoring
Simon Gamache (4) - pp - 17:01		First overtime period		No scoring
Brian Finley 36 saves / 38 shots		Goalie stats		Frederic Cassivi 33 saves / 36 shots

April 25	Milwaukee Admirals	3 – 0	Cincinnati Mighty Ducks	Bradley Center
Paul Brown (2) - pp - 13:23		First period	No scoring
Simon Gamache (5) - 1:16; Darren Haydar (2) - pp - 16:08		Second period	No scoring
No scoring		Third period	No scoring
Brian Finley 28 saves / 28 shots		Goalie stats	Frederic Cassivi 15 saves / 18 shots Ilya Bryzgalov 13 saves / 13 shots

April 27	Cincinnati Mighty Ducks	3 – 1	Milwaukee Admirals	Cincinnati Gardens
Shane O'Brien (1) - pp - 12:29		First period	No scoring
No scoring		Second period	10:07 - pp - Andrew Hutchinson (1)
Zenon Konopka (3) - pp - 15:55; Michael Holmqvist (1) - pp - 18:34		Third period	No scoring
Ilya Bryzgalov 20 saves / 21 shots		Goalie stats	Brian Finley 31 saves / 34 shots

April 29	Cincinnati Mighty Ducks	5 – 1	Milwaukee Admirals	Cincinnati Gardens
3:18 - sh - Michael Holmqvist (2); 8:09 - pp - Kurtis Foster (1)		First period	Wyatt Smith (1) - sh - 7:01
19:43 - Aaron Rome (1)		Second period	No scoring
15;20 - sh - Mark Popovic (1); 16:25 - pp - Aaron Rome (2)		Third period	No scoring
Ilya Bryzgalov 29 saves / 30 shots		Goalie stats	Brian Finley 22 saves / 27 shots

May 1	Milwaukee Admirals	3 – 4	Cincinnati Mighty Ducks	Bradley Center
10:22 - Brandon Segal (1); 17:50 - pp - Darren Haydar (3)		First period	Casey Hankinson (1) - 4:37; P. A. Parenteau (1) - 6:50; Kurtis Foster (2) - 8:13
19:09 - Simon Gamache (6)		Second period	No scoring
No scoring		Third period	Mark Popovic (2) - 19:47
Brian Finley 24 saves / 28 shots Seamus Kotyk 0 saves / 0 shots		Goalie stats	Ilya Bryzgalov 23 saves / 26 shots

Cincinnati won series 4 – 3

== Division Finals ==
=== Eastern Conference ===
==== Atlantic Division ====
===== (A3) Lowell Lock Monsters vs. (A4) Providence Bruins =====
May 6	Lowell Lock Monsters	4 – 5	Providence Bruins	Tsongas Arena
9:27 - pp - Colin Forbes (1); 18:37 - pp - Mike Commodore (1)		First period	Brad Boyes (3) - 2:58; Jay Henderson (1) - 3:42
10:29 - Bruno St. Jacques (1)		Second period	Patrice Bergeron (3) - 9:04
5:57 - Dustin Johner (1)		Third period	Jayme Filipowicz (2) - 6:35; David Gove (1) - 18:52
Cam Ward 27 saves / 32 shots		Goalie stats	Hannu Toivonen 29 saves / 33 shots

May 7	Lowell Lock Monsters	4 – 0	Providence Bruins	Tsongas Arena
7:20 - Chuck Kobasew (4); 16:04 - pp - Chad LaRose (2)		First period	No scoring
16:55 - sh - Chuck Kobasew (5)		Second period	No scoring
15:46 - ps - Eric Staal (2)		Third period	No scoring
Cam Ward 27 saves / 27 shots		Goalie stats	Hannu Toivonen 33 saves / 37 shots

May 11	Lowell Lock Monsters	1 – 4	Providence Bruins	Tsongas Arena
No scoring		First period	8:04 - Patrice Bergeron (4); 10:09 - Brent Thompson (1)
No scoring		Second period	No scoring
Chuck Kobasew (6) - 4:28		Third period	3:00 - Brad Boyes (4); 18:19 - Tomas Kurka (4)
Cam Ward 27 saves / 31 shots		Goalie stats	Hannu Toivonen 34 saves / 35 shots

May 13	Providence Bruins	3 – 2	OT	Lowell Lock Monsters	Dunkin' Donuts Center
19:26 - Pat Leahy (3)		First period		Colin Forbes (2) - 18:01
6:03 - Brad Boyes (5)		Second period		Colin Forbes (3) - 12:58
No scoring		Third period		No scoring
9:22 - Keith Aucoin (3)		First overtime period		No scoring
Hannu Toivonen 32 saves / 34 shots		Goalie stats		Cam Ward 29 saves / 32 shots

May 14	Providence Bruins	5 – 2	Lowell Lock Monsters	Dunkin' Donuts Center
Andy Hilbert (4) - pp - 16:55		First period	No scoring
David Gove (2) - pp - 9:07; Brad Boyes (6) - sh - 13:43; Ben Guite (2) - 15:30		Second period	1:26 - Chad LaRose (3); 6:27 - pp - Michael Zigomanis (4)
Ben Guite (3) - en - 19:54		Third period	No scoring
Hannu Toivonen 29 saves / 31 shots		Goalie stats	Cam Ward 27 saves / 31 shots Brent Krahn 0 saves / 0 shots

Providence won series 4 – 1

==== East Division ====
===== (E2) Philadelphia Phantoms vs. (E4) Wilkes-Barre/Scranton Penguins =====
May 4	Philadelphia Phantoms	4 – 1	Wilkes-Barre/Scranton Penguins	Wachovia Center
12:47 - Jeff Carter (5)		First period	No scoring
7:53 - pp - Mike Richards (1); 13:01 - pp - Jon Sim (2)		Second period	No scoring
12:07 - Todd Fedoruk (2)		Third period	Ryan Whitney (1) - 16:40
Antero Nittymaki 17 saves / 18 shots		Goalie stats	Andy Chiodo 12 saves / 15 shots Marc-Andre Fleury 12 saves / 13 shots

May 6	Philadelphia Phantoms	4 – 1	Wilkes-Barre/Scranton Penguins	Wachovia Center
14:02 - Joni Pitkanen (1)		First period	No scoring
12:46 - Jon Sim (3)		Second period	No scoring
2:54 - pp - Jeff Carter (6); 13:36 - Eric Meloche (2)		Third period	Colby Armstrong (3) - 7:11
Antero Nittymaki 30 saves / 31 shots		Goalie stats	Marc-Andre Fleury 22 saves / 26 shots

May 7	Wilkes-Barre/Scranton Penguins	3 – 1	Philadelphia Phantoms	Wachovia Arena at Casey Plaza
No scoring		First period	No scoring
No scoring		Second period	No scoring
1:26 - Colby Armstrong (4); 1:46 - Matt Hussey (1); 19:48 - en - Guillaume Lefebvre (1)		Third period	Jeff Carter (7) - pp - 17:15
Andy Chiodo 19 saves / 20 shots		Goalie stats	Antero Nittymaki 22 saves / 24 shots

May 10	Wilkes-Barre/Scranton Penguins	3 – 5	Philadelphia Phantoms	Wachovia Arena at Casey Plaza
No scoring		First period	Mike Richards (2) - sh - 12:45
15:22 - pp - Ryan Whitney (2)		Second period	R.J. Umberger (2) - 5:55
6:06 - Rob Scuderi (2); 17:09 - pp - Shane Endicott (2)		Third period	Joni Pitkanen (2) - 2:49; Patrick Sharp (3) - pp - 8:35; Jon Sim (4) - pp - 14:47
Andy Chiodo 21 saves / 26 shots		Goalie stats	Antero Nittymaki 26 saves / 29 shots

May 13	Philadelphia Phantoms	7 – 4	Wilkes-Barre/Scranton Penguins	Wachovia Center
0:49 - sh - Mike Richards (3)		First period	Tomas Surovy (1) - pp - 1:28; Matt Murley (3) - 18:44
No scoring		Second period	Kris Beech (4) - pp - 11:52
8:37 - Josh Gratton (2); 11:45 - pp - Jeff Carter (8); 12:49 - Jon Sim (5); 13:56 - Ryan Ready (1); 17:20 - Jeff Carter (9); 19:56 - en - Jon Sim (6)		Third period	Tomas Surovy (2) - 0:37
Antero Nittymaki 20 saves / 24 shots Neil Little 2 saves / 2 shots		Goalie stats	Andy Chiodo 22 saves / 27 shots Marc-Andre Fleury 1 save / 2 shots

Philadelphia won series 4 – 1

=== Western Conference ===
==== North Division ====
===== (N1) Rochester Americans vs. (N3) Manitoba Moose =====
May 4	Rochester Americans	4 – 2	Manitoba Moose	Blue Cross Arena at the War Memorial
No scoring		First period	Jeff Heerema (3) - 7:08
No scoring		Second period	Ryan Kesler (3) - sh - 11:48
7:34 - pp - David Cullen (1); 7:45 - Daniel Paille (1); 14:23 - pp - Derek Roy (3); 19:17 - pp - en - Derek Roy (4)		Third period	No scoring
Ryan Miller 24 saves / 26 shots		Goalie stats	Wade Flaherty 20 saves / 23 shots

May 6	Rochester Americans	0 – 1	Manitoba Moose	Blue Cross Arena at the War Memorial
No scoring		First period	Peter Sarno (1) - 0:26
No scoring		Second period	No scoring
No scoring		Third period	No scoring
Ryan Miller 24 saves / 25 shots		Goalie stats	Wade Flaherty 31 saves / 31 shots

May 9	Manitoba Moose	5 – 4	OT	Rochester Americans	MTS Centre
14:03 - Lee Goren (6)		First period		Paul Gaustad (5) - 8:52
16:46 - pp - Lee Goren (7)		Second period		Derek Roy (5) - pp - 6:56; Nathan Paetsch (1) - 9:29
10:05 - Ryan Kesler (4); 12:06 - Josh Green (4)		Third period		Derek Roy (6) - 5:02
10:22 - Jeff Heerema (4)		First overtime period		No scoring
Wade Flaherty 29 saves / 33 shots		Goalie stats		Ryan Miller 28 saves / 33 shots

May 11	Manitoba Moose	2 – 1	Rochester Americans	MTS Centre
12:09 - pp - Lee Goren (8)		First period	Daniel Paille (2) - 5:57
No scoring		Second period	No scoring
16:48 - Jimmy Roy (2)		Third period	No scoring
Wade Flaherty 25 saves / 26 shots		Goalie stats	Ryan Miller 29 saves / 31 shots

May 13	Manitoba Moose	5 – 2	Rochester Americans	MTS Centre
Jesse Schultz (2) - 7:30		First period	4:08 - pp - David Cullen (2); 16:28 - Paul Gaustad (6)
Josh Green (5) - pp - 1:01; Josh Green (6) - 1:19; Josh Green (7) - 11:30		Second period	No scoring
Lee Goren (9) - 7:31		Third period	No scoring
Wade Flaherty 16 saves / 18 shots		Goalie stats	Ryan Miller 23 saves / 28 shots

Manitoba won series 4 – 1

==== West Division ====
===== (W1) Chicago Wolves vs. (W3) Cincinnati Mighty Ducks =====
May 4	Chicago Wolves	5 – 2	Cincinnati Mighty Ducks	Allstate Arena
9:05 - Derek MacKenzie (2); 18:58 - Karl Stewart (2)		First period	No scoring
5:31 - Karl Stewart (3); 12:02 - Tommi Santala (3)		Second period	No scoring
7:27 - Lonny Bohonos (1)		Third period	P. A. Parenteau (2) - pp - 3:13; Ryan Getzlaf (1) - 13:14
Kari Lehtonen 27 saves / 29 shots		Goalie stats	Ilya Bryzgalov 5 saves / 8 shots Frederic Cassivi 12 saves / 14 shots

May 7	Chicago Wolves	2 – 1	Cincinnati Mighty Ducks	Allstate Arena
11:26 - Cory Larose (2)		First period	Aaron Rome (3) - 12:37
No scoring		Second period	No scoring
19:16 - sh - Karl Stewart (4)		Third period	No scoring
Michael Garnett 35 saves / 36 shots		Goalie stats	Ilya Bryzgalov 30 saves / 32 shots

May 9	Cincinnati Mighty Ducks	2 – 5	Chicago Wolves	Cincinnati Gardens
13:13 - sh - Casey Hankinson (2)		First period	Cory Larose (3) - 10:39
No scoring		Second period	Cory Larose (4) - 4:35; J.P. Vigier (2) - 5:43; Tommi Santala (4) - 15:06
14:26 - Curtis Glencross (1)		Third period	Cory Larose (5) - 7:13
Ilya Bryzgalov 2 saves / 5 shots Frederic Cassivi 15 saves / 18 shots		Goalie stats	Michael Garnett 32 saves / 34 shots

May 11	Cincinnati Mighty Ducks	3 – 2	Chicago Wolves	Cincinnati Gardens
3:16 - Joffrey Lupul (3); 15:27 - pp - Dustin Penner (2); 18:26 - pp - Stanislav Chistov (2)		First period	Steve Maltais (2) - 2:45
No scoring		Second period	No scoring
No scoring		Third period	Brad Larsen (3) - 11:45
Frederic Cassivi 31 saves / 33 shots		Goalie stats	Kari Lehtonen 33 saves / 36 shots

May 13	Chicago Wolves	4 – 1	Cincinnati Mighty Ducks	Allstate Arena
No scoring		First period	No scoring
No scoring		Second period	Curtis Glencross (2) - 5:54
7:08 - pp - Joe Corvo (2); 16:13 - pp - Brad Larsen (4); 19:37 - en - Cory Larose (6); 19:56 - en - Derek MacKenzie (3)		Third period	No scoring
Kari Lehtonen 21 saves / 22 shots		Goalie stats	Frederic Cassivi 38 saves / 40 shots

Chicago won series 4 – 1

== Conference finals ==
=== Eastern Conference ===
==== (E2) Philadelphia Phantoms vs. (A4) Providence Bruins ====
May 20	Philadelphia Phantoms	4 – 2	Providence Bruins	Wachovia Center
4:53 - pp - Freddy Meyer (1); 18:42 - sh - Freddy Meyer (2)		First period	No scoring
16:31 - Freddy Meyer (3)		Second period	Kevin Dallman (4) - pp - 15:46
19:11 - en - Mike Richards (4)		Third period	Andy Hilbert (5) - pp - 14:05
Antero Niittymaki 22 saves / 24 shots		Goalie stats	Hannu Toivonen 33 saves / 36 shots

May 21	Philadelphia Phantoms	3 – 0	Providence Bruins	Wachovia Center
7:02 - Jeff Carter (10)		First period	No scoring
No scoring		Second period	No scoring
0:29 - R.J. Umberger (3); 19:04 - en - Mike Richards (5)		Third period	No scoring
Antero Niittymaki 33 saves / 33 shots		Goalie stats	Hannu Toivonen 22 saves / 24 shots

May 23	Providence Bruins	2 – 1	OT	Philadelphia Phantoms	Dunkin' Donuts Center
No scoring		First period		Joni Pitkanen (3) - 8:10
No scoring		Second period		No scoring
13:06 - Keith Aucoin (4)		Third period		No scoring
14:08 - Brad Boyes (7)		First overtime period		No scoring
Hannu Toivonen 36 saves / 37 shots		Goalie stats		Antero Niittymaki 36 saves / 38 shots

May 25	Providence Bruins	1 – 2	Philadelphia Phantoms	Dunkin' Donuts Center
No scoring		First period	No scoring
17:18 - pp - Andy Hilbert (6)		Second period	John Slaney (2) - 7:45
No scoring		Third period	Jon Sim (7) - 9:50
Hannu Toivonen 29 saves / 31 shots		Goalie stats	Antero Niittymaki 34 saves / 35 shots

May 27	Providence Bruins	6 – 4	Philadelphia Phantoms	Dunkin' Donuts Center
Patrice Bergeron (5) - 6:01		First period	13:27 - Eric Meloche (3)
Andy Hilbert (7) - pp - 0:07; Colton Orr (1) - 3:18; Andrew Alberts (1) - 8:55		Second period	No scoring
Brad Boyes (8) - 18:50; Pat Leahy (4) - en - 19:04		Third period	10:52 - Josh Gratton (3); 14:15 - Dennis Seidenberg (2); 15:35 - Jeff Carter (11)
Hannu Toivonen 34 saves / 38 shots Chris Madden 0 saves / 0 shots		Goalie stats	Antero Niittymaki 19 saves / 24 shots Neil Little 3 saves / 3 shots

May 29	Philadelphia Phantoms	4 – 1	Providence Bruins	Wachovia Center
Ryan Ready (2) - 6:01; Jeff Carter (12) - pp - 12:18		First period	No scoring
Jon Sim (8) - 10:07		Second period	15:30 - Dave Gove (3)
Patrick Sharp (4) - 2:35		Third period	No scoring
Antero Niittymaki 19 saves / 20 shots		Goalie stats	Hannu Toivonen 25 saves / 29 shots

Philadelphia won series 4 – 2

=== Western Conference ===
==== (W1) Chicago Wolves vs. (N3) Manitoba Moose ====
May 19	Chicago Wolves	4 – 3	Manitoba Moose	Allstate Arena
0:50 - Derek MacKenzie (4)		First period	Justin Morrison (1) - 2:15
13:11 - Tim Wedderburn (1)		Second period	No scoring
0:44 - J.P. Vigier (3); 9:04 - Brian Sipotz (1)		Third period	Cory Pecker (1) - 16:11; Lee Goren (10) - 18:40
Kari Lehtonen 16 saves / 19 shots		Goalie stats	Wade Flaherty 19 saves / 23 shots Alex Auld 3 saves / 3 shots

May 21	Chicago Wolves	3 – 0	Manitoba Moose	Allstate Arena
No scoring		First period	No scoring
1:59 - pp - Steve Maltais (3); 13:59 - Travis Roche (1)		Second period	No scoring
19:22 - sh - en - Joe Corvo (3)		Third period	No scoring
Kari Lehtonen 26 saves / 26 shots		Goalie stats	Wade Flaherty 30 saves / 32 shots

May 23	Manitoba Moose	2 – 4	Chicago Wolves	MTS Centre
19:04 - Josh Green (8)		First period	Tommi Santala (5) - 0:33; Derek MacKenzie (5) - 3:27
2:19 - Jesse Schultz (3)		Second period	No scoring
No scoring		Third period	Stephen Weiss (2) - 1:32; Ben Simon (1) - en - 19:38
Alex Auld 15 saves / 18 shots		Goalie stats	Kari Lehtonen 38 saves / 40 shots

May 25	Manitoba Moose	1 – 4	Chicago Wolves	MTS Centre
No scoring		First period	No scoring
No scoring		Second period	Lonny Bohonos (2) - 3:51; J.P. Vigier (4) - pp - 7:17; Brian Maloney (2) - 10:30
17:04 - Josh Green (9)		Third period	Joe Corvo (4) - 0:39
Alex Auld 25 saves / 29 shots		Goalie stats	Kari Lehtonen 26 saves / 27 shots

Chicago won series 4 – 0

== Calder Cup Final ==
=== (W1) Chicago Wolves vs. (E2) Philadelphia Phantoms ===
June 2	Chicago Wolves	0 – 1	Philadelphia Phantoms	Allstate Arena
No scoring		First period	No scoring
No scoring		Second period	Mike Richards (6) - 5:58
No scoring		Third period	No scoring
Kari Lehtonen 31 saves / 32 shots		Goalie stats	Antero Nittymaki 27 saves / 27 shots

June 4	Chicago Wolves	1 – 2	2OT	Philadelphia Phantoms	Allstate Arena
No scoring		First period		No scoring
4:52 - pp - Steve Maltais (4)		Second period		John Slaney (3) - pp - 14:11
No scoring		Third period		No scoring
No scoring		Second overtime period		Patrick Sharp (5) - 3:50
Kari Lehtonen 26 saves / 28 shots		Goalie stats		Antero Nittymaki 48 saves / 49 shots

June 8	Philadelphia Phantoms	2 – 1	Chicago Wolves	Wachovia Center
8:50 - pp - Mike Richards (7); 9:57 - pp - Patrick Sharp (6)		First period	No scoring
No scoring		Second period	J.P. Vigier (5) - pp - 8:34
No scoring		Third period	No scoring
Antero Nittymaki 29 saves / 30 shots		Goalie stats	Kari Lehtonen 22 saves / 24 shots

June 10	Philadelphia Phantoms	5 – 2	Chicago Wolves	Wachovia Center
No scoring		First period	No scoring
5:32 - Patrick Sharp (7); 12:42 - Jon Sim (9); 18:05 - Ben Stafford (2); 19:47 - pp - Jon Sim (10)		Second period	No scoring
8:49 - Patrick Sharp (8)		Third period	Steve Maltais (5) - pp - 4:37; Lonny Bohonos (3) - 16:07
Antero Nittymaki 28 saves / 30 shots		Goalie stats	Kari Lehtonen 25 saves / 29 shots

Philadelphia won series 4 – 0

== Playoff statistical leaders ==
=== Leading skaters ===
These are the top ten skaters based on points. If there is a tie in points, goals take precedence over assists.

GP = Games played; G = Goals; A = Assists; Pts = Points; +/– = Plus–minus; PIM = Penalty minutes

Player	Team	GP	G	A	Pts	+/–	PIM
Jeff Carter	Philadelphia Phantoms	21	12	11	23	+10	12
Patrick Sharp	Philadelphia Phantoms	21	8	13	21	+9	20
Andy Hilbert	Providence Bruins	17	7	14	21	+3	27
Keith Aucoin	Providence Bruins	17	4	14	18	–5	18
Jon Sim	Philadelphia Phantoms	21	10	7	17	+7	44
Brad Boyes	Providence Bruins	16	8	7	15	–1	23
Mike Richards	Philadelphia Phantoms	14	7	8	15	+8	28
Josh Green	Manitoba Moose	14	9	5	14	–1	26
Lee Goren	Manitoba Moose	14	10	3	13	+4	23
Ryan Ready	Philadelphia Phantoms	19	2	11	13	+5	6

=== Leading goaltenders ===
This is a combined table of the top five goaltenders based on goals against average and the top five goaltenders based on save percentage with at least 420 minutes played. The table is initially sorted by goals against average, with the criterion for inclusion in bold.

GP = Games played; W = Wins; L = Losses; SA = Shots against; GA = Goals against; GAA = Goals against average; SV% = Save percentage; SO = Shutouts; TOI = Time on ice (in minutes)

Player	Team	GP	W	L	SA	GA	GAA	SV%	SO	TOI
Kari Lehtonen	Chicago Wolves	16	10	6	457	28	**1.71**	**.939**	2	983
Antero Niittymaki	Philadelphia Phantoms	21	15	5	648	37	**1.75**	**.943**	3	1269
Wade Flaherty	Manitoba Moose	12	8	4	329	29	**2.42**	.912	2	720
Hannu Toivonen	Providence Bruins	17	10	7	547	42	**2.43**	**.923**	0	1038
Andy Chiodo	Wilkes-Barre/Scranton Penguins	9	5	4	244	23	**2.48**	.906	1	556
Cam Ward	Lowell Lock Monsters	11	5	6	340	28	2.53	**.918**	2	664
Brian Finley	Milwaukee Admirals	7	3	4	229	20	2.62	**.913**	1	458

== See also ==
- 2004–05 AHL season
- List of AHL seasons

Preceded by 2004 Calder Cup playoffs	Calder Cup playoffs 2005	Succeeded by 2006 Calder Cup playoffs
