= Norfolk Admirals (AHL) =

Defunct ice hockey team

- City: Norfolk, Virginia
- League: American Hockey League
- Conference: Eastern Conference
- Division: East Division
- Founded: 2000
- Operated: 2000–2015
- Home arena: Norfolk Scope
- Colors: Blue, red, white, gold
- Media: The Virginian-Pilot; WGNT
- Affiliates: Chicago Blackhawks (2000–2007); Tampa Bay Lightning (2007–2012); Anaheim Ducks (2012–2015)

Franchise history
- 2000–2015: Norfolk Admirals
- 2015–present: San Diego Gulls

Championships
- Regular season titles: 1 (2011–12)
- Division titles: 3 (2001–02, 2002–03, 2011–12)
- Conference titles: 1 (2011–12)
- Calder Cups: 1 (2011–12)

The Norfolk Admirals were a professional ice hockey team based in Norfolk, Virginia, that competed in the American Hockey League (AHL). The team played its home games at Norfolk Scope. The Admirals were the AHL affiliate of the Tampa Bay Lightning and Anaheim Ducks.

For the 2015–16 season, the Admirals moved to San Diego, California, to become the newest version of the San Diego Gulls as part of the AHL's efforts to create a Pacific Division. The Bakersfield Condors from the ECHL moved to Norfolk for the 2015–16 season and also use the name Norfolk Admirals.

== History ==
The market was previously home to:

- Tidewater Wings (1971–1972 AHL)
- Virginia Wings (1972–1975 AHL)
- Hampton Gulls (1974–1977 SHL, 1977–1978 AHL)
- Hampton Aces (1978–1981 NEHL)
- Hampton Roads Gulls (1982–1983 ACHL)
- Hampton Roads Admirals (1989–2000 ECHL)

The original team ownership, Mark Garcea and Page Johnson (owners of the Hampton Roads Admirals franchise in the East Coast Hockey League), sought and gained admission to the American Hockey League as an expansion franchise for the 2000–01 season with an affiliation agreement with the Chicago Blackhawks. On May 26, 2004, the franchise was purchased by Ken Young after the original owners had put it up for sale. The team name pays homage to the area's long naval history.

Norfolk was one of two franchises in the AHL named the Admirals, sharing the nickname with the Milwaukee Admirals. The Milwaukee franchise transferred from the defunct International Hockey League, and were allowed to keep their previous moniker.

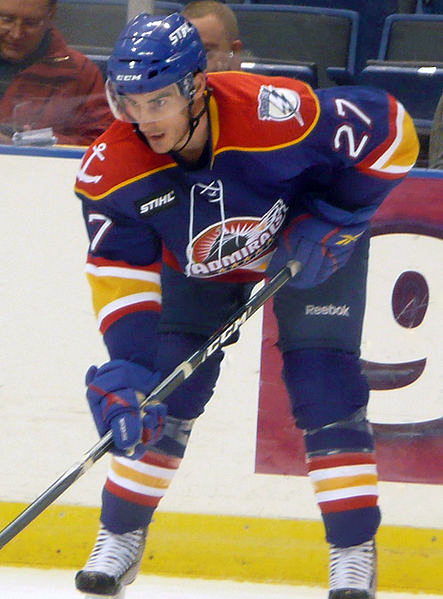
Brandon Bochenski with the Admirals.

Norfolk's geographically closest rivals were the Hershey Bears, Charlotte Checkers, and Wilkes-Barre/Scranton Penguins. The Admirals had two mascots, a dog named Salty and a rabbit named Hat Trick.

On March 19, 2007, the Blackhawks announced that their affiliation with the Admirals would end after the 2006–07 season. On March 29, 2007, the Tampa Bay Lightning officially announced the Admirals as their new affiliate. On June 14, 2012 Tampa Bay announced their separation from the 2012 Calder Cup champions in favor of the Syracuse Crunch. Later in that month owner Ken Young announced he had closed a five-year agreement with the Anaheim Ducks.

=== 2011–12 season ===
During the 2011–12 season, the Norfolk Admirals, coached by Jon Cooper, set a professional hockey record for the longest winning streak, winning their 28th consecutive game on April 15 against the Adirondack Phantoms. The streak far surpassed the previous AHL record of 17 straight wins set by the Philadelphia Phantoms in 2004–05, as well as the pro hockey record of 18 games set by the Peoria Rivermen of the original International Hockey League in 1991.

The streak garnered international media attention for the Admirals and the American Hockey League, including highlights on NHL Network and ESPN's SportsCenter.

The 28-game streak included 15 home games and 13 road games. The win streak started on February 10 against Adirondack. Before their 3-2 OT win against Binghamton on April 14, the previous 20 games were all won in regulation. As of October 20, 2012, the Admirals had won 32 regular season games in a row dating back to the 2011–12 season.

The winning streak translated into a deep playoff run for the Admirals, where they would win 15 of 18 playoff games, including back to back four game sweeps in the Eastern Conference and Calder Cup Finals. On June 9, 2012, the Admirals captured their first ever Calder Cup with a 6–1 win over the Toronto Marlies.

Prior to the 2012–13 season, the Admirals and the Syracuse Crunch parent NHL organizations swapped teams. As a result, the Admirals failed to qualify for the Calder Cup playoffs while the Crunch made it to the Calder Cup Finals.

=== Relocation ===
On January 6, 2015, rumors arose that the Admirals would move to an unknown location on the west coast after the franchise was purchased by the Anaheim Ducks. On January 29, 2015, the Ducks confirmed the Admirals' relocation to San Diego to become the newest incarnation of the San Diego Gulls. The Admirals were replaced in Norfolk with the relocated Bakersfield Condors franchise of the ECHL. The new team retained the Admirals name and logo but were affiliated with the Edmonton Oilers.

== Players ==
=== Team Captains ===
- Aaron Downey, 2000–2001
- Ajay Baines, 2002–2006
- Craig MacDonald, 2006–2007
- Dan Jancevski, 2007–2008
- Zenon Konopka, 2008–2009
- Ryan Craig, 2009–2010
- Chris Durno, 2010–2011
- Mike Angelidis, 2011–2012
- Nate Guenin, 2012–2013
- Garnet Exelby, 2013–2014
- Dave Steckel, 2014–2015

=== Notable alumni ===
NHL alumni of the Norfolk Admirals include:

- Craig Anderson
- Tyler Arnason
- Michal Barinka
- Cam Barker
- Mark Bell
- Brandon Bochenski
- Rene Bourque
- Wade Brookbank
- Troy Brouwer
- Adam Burish
- Dustin Byfuglien
- Kyle Calder
- Cory Conacher
- Ryan Craig
- Corey Crawford
- Aaron Downey
- Steve Downie
- Vernon Fiddler
- Colin Fraser
- Adam Hall
- Tyler Johnson
- Duncan Keith
- Alex Killorn
- David Koci
- Zenon Konopka
- Michael Leighton
- Reed Low
- Mike Lundin
- Craig MacDonald
- Patrick Maroon
- Travis Moen
- Ondrej Palat
- Mark Parrish
- Mike Peluso
- Nathan Perrott
- Martin St. Pierre
- Brent Seabrook
- Matt Smaby
- Paul Szczechura
- Shawn Thornton
- Kris Versteeg
- Ty Wishart
- James Wisniewski

=== 2010 Stanley Cup Finals ===
In the 2010 Stanley Cup Finals, sixteen former Admirals competed for the championship. Bryan Bickell, Dave Bolland, Troy Brouwer, Adam Burish, Dustin Byfuglien, Corey Crawford, Jake Dowell, Colin Fraser, Jordan Hendry, Duncan Keith, Danny Richmond, Brent Seabrook, Jack Skille, and Kris Versteeg were on the Chicago Blackhawks active roster. Michael Leighton and Lukas Krajicek played for the Philadelphia Flyers.

== Team records ==
=== Season-by-season results ===
Regular season												Playoffs					
Season	Games	Won	Lost	Tied	OTL	SOL	Points	PCT	Goals for	Goals against	Standing	Year	Prelims	1st round	2nd round	3rd round	Finals
2000–01	80	36	26	13	5	—	90	.563	241	208	3rd, South	2001	—	W, 3–1, CIN	L, 1–4, HER	—	—
2001–02	80	38	26	12	4	—	92	.575	222	205	1st, South	2002	—	L, 1–3, HER	—	—	—
2002–03	80	37	26	12	5	—	91	.569	201	187	1st, South	2003	—	W, 3–0, SA	L, 2–4, HOU	—	—
2003–04	80	35	36	4	5	—	79	.494	172	187	5th, East	2004	W, 2–0, BNG	L, 2–4, PHI	—	—	—
2004–05	80	43	30	—	6	1	93	.581	200	188	3rd, East	2005	—	L, 2–4, PHI	—	—	—
2005–06	80	43	29	—	4	4	94	.588	259	246	3rd, East	2006	—	L, 0–4, HER	—	—	—
2006–07	80	50	22	—	6	2	108	.675	301	257	3rd, East	2007	—	L, 2–4, WBS	—	—	—
2007–08	80	29	44	—	2	5	65	.406	213	267	7th, East	2008	Out of playoffs				
2008–09	80	33	38	—	4	5	75	.469	236	269	6th, East	2009	Out of playoffs				
2009–10	80	39	35	—	3	3	84	.525	208	214	4th, East	2010	Out of playoffs				
2010–11	80	39	26	—	9	6	93	.581	265	230	4th, East	2011	—	L, 2–4, WBS	—	—	—
2011–12	76	55	18	—	1	2	113	.743	273	180	1st, East	2012	—	W, 3–1, MAN	W, 4–2 CON	W, 4–0 STJ	W, 4–0, TOR
2012–13	76	37	34	—	4	1	79	.520	188	207	5th, East	2013	Out of playoffs				
2013–14	76	40	26	—	3	7	90	.592	201	192	3rd, East	2014	—	W, 3–1, MAN	L, 2-4, STJ	—	—
2014–15	76	27	39	—	6	4	64	.421	168	219	5th, East	2015	Out of playoffs				

=== Single-season records ===
Goals: Troy Brouwer, 41 (2006–07)
Assists: Martin St. Pierre, 72 (2006–07)
Points: Martin St. Pierre, 99 (2006–07)
Penalty minutes: Zack Stortini, 299 (2013- 2014)
Wins: Corey Crawford, 38 (2006–07)
GAA: Craig Anderson, 1.94 (2002–03)
SV%: Craig Anderson, .923 (2002–03)

=== Career records ===
Career goals: Brandon Bochenski, 81
Career assists: Marty Wilford, 141
Career points: Blair Jones, 185
Career penalty minutes: Shawn Thornton, 1198
Career goaltending wins: Dustin Tokarski, 80
Career shutouts: Michael Leighton, 18
Career games: Ajay Baines, 409
