= Tommi Santala =

Finnish professional ice hockey player (born 1979)

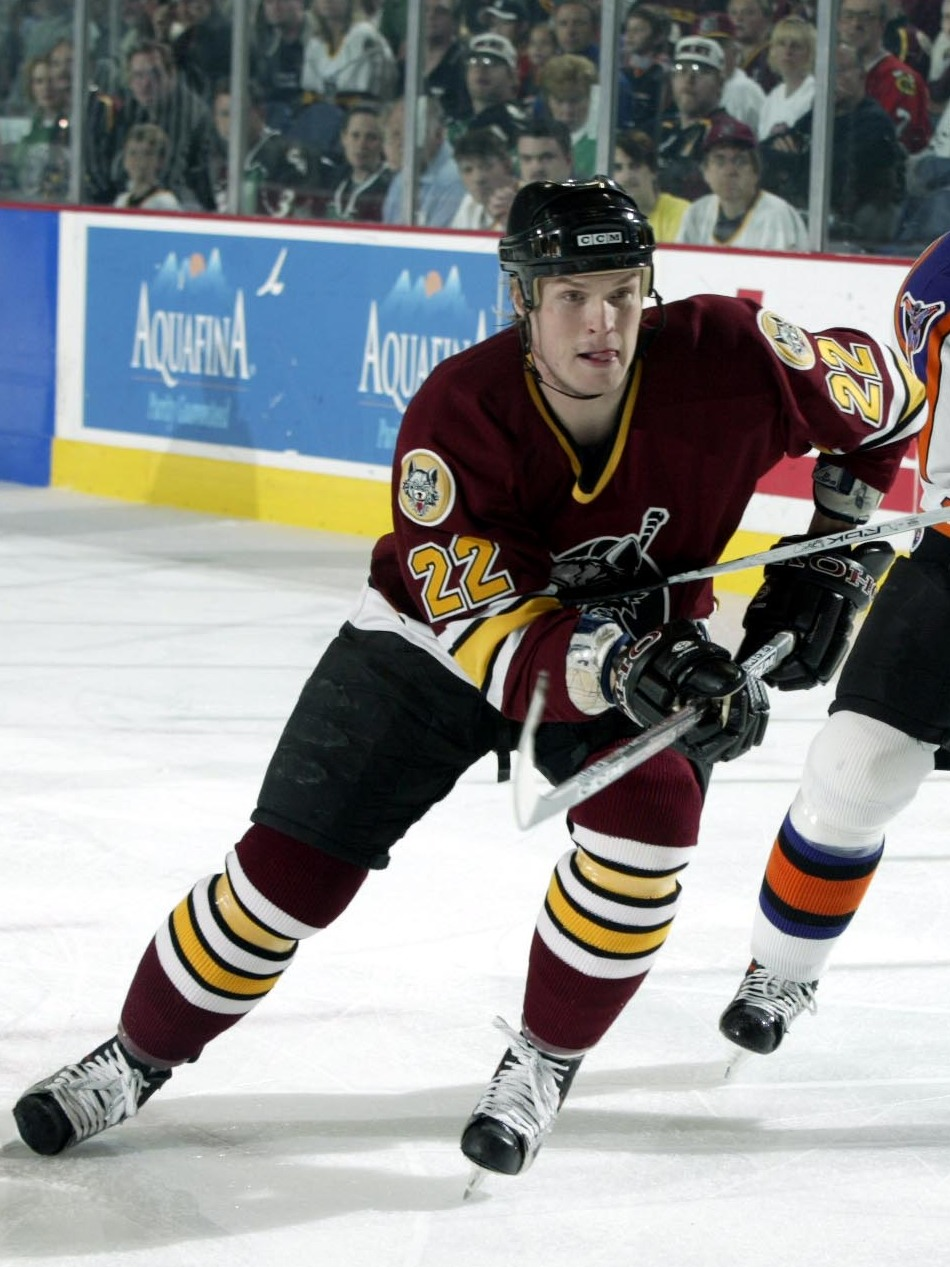
- Santala with the Chicago Wolves in 2005
- Born: 27 June 1979 (age 46) Helsinki, Finland
- Height: 6 ft 3 in (191 cm)
- Weight: 216 lb (98 kg; 15 st 6 lb)
- Position: Centre
- Shoots: Right
- Liiga team Former teams: HIFK; EHC Kloten; Jokerit; HPK; Atlanta Thrashers; Vancouver Canucks
- National team: Finland
- NHL draft: 245th overall, 1999; Atlanta Thrashers
- Playing career: 1998–present

Tommi Santala (born 27 June 1979 in Helsinki, Finland) is a Finnish professional ice hockey player who is currently playing for HIFK of the Liiga.

== Playing career ==
Santala started his pro career in Jokerit in the Finnish SM-liiga in the 1998–99 season. After a total of four seasons with HPK, Santala moved to the Thrashers' organisation for the 2003–04 NHL season. Santala divided his time between 50 games in the AHL Chicago Wolves and 33 NHL games. He spent the 2004–05 NHL lockout with the Wolves registering 40 assists and 48 points in 67 games. During the post-season he helped Chicago win the Robert W. Clarke Trophy, for AHL Western Conference Champions, by adding 11 points in 18 games. However, the Wolves were swept in the Calder Cup finals by the Philadelphia Phantoms.

After the lockout, Santala was assigned to Jokerit by the Thrashers. He played one year with Jokerit before Atlanta traded him to the Vancouver Canucks. Santala played 30 games for the Canucks during the 2006–07 season, but he suffered a knee injury on 8 December 2006 in a game vs. the Carolina Hurricanes that forced him to miss the majority of the season. On 5 September 2007 he signed as a free agent with Jokerit.

After one season back with Jokerit, Santala opted to leave and sign with Swiss club, the Kloten Flyers from the 2008–09 season. He parted company with the team in December 2016 to join the KHL. On 23 December 2016 he signed a deal with Metallurg Magnitogorsk.

Unhappy with his KHL experience, Santala returned to EHC Kloten on a one-year deal for the 2017-18 season.

== International play ==
Santala played for Team Finland in the 1999 World Junior Championship registering two points through six games. He represented Finland at the World Championships in, 2003, 2006, 2009, and 2010. However, he only played one game for the 2006 Finnish team that won the Bronze medal. Santala had a much larger role for Finland during the 2002 Karelia Cup. Finland won the Gold and Santala was named a Second Team All-Star.

== Career statistics ==
=== Regular season and playoffs ===
			Regular season					Playoffs
Season	Team	League	GP	G	A	Pts	PIM	GP	G	A	Pts	PIM
1998–99	Jokerit	SM-l	30	0	0	0	14	3	0	0	0	0
1999–00	Jokerit	SM-l	14	0	1	1	2	—	—	—	—	—
1999–00	HPK	SM-l	38	8	19	27	63	8	3	4	7	10
2000–01	HPK	SM-l	56	16	24	40	90	—	—	—	—	—
2001–02	HPK	SM-l	17	6	16	22	14	—	—	—	—	—
2002–03	HPK	SM-l	50	13	38	51	92	13	6	6	12	18
2003–04	Atlanta Thrashers	NHL	33	1	2	3	22	—	—	—	—	—
2003–04	Chicago Wolves	AHL	50	15	22	37	34	10	1	6	7	31
2004–05	Chicago Wolves	AHL	67	8	40	48	83	18	5	6	11	42
2005–06	Jokerit	SM-l	43	9	23	32	80	—	—	—	—	—
2006–07	Manitoba Moose	AHL	6	0	3	3	8	—	—	—	—	—
2006–07	Vancouver Canucks	NHL	30	1	5	6	24	1	0	0	0	0
2007–08	Jokerit	SM-l	56	28	30	58	82	13	4	12	16	18
2008–09	Kloten Flyers	NLA	50	13	35	48	96	15	4	5	9	18
2009–10	Kloten Flyers	NLA	47	17	32	49	59	10	4	5	9	20
2010–11	Kloten Flyers	NLA	49	10	36	46	78	16	4	7	11	32
2011–12	Kloten Flyers	NLA	47	9	35	44	46	5	1	2	3	4
2012–13	Kloten Flyers	NLA	45	11	27	38	62	—	—	—	—	—
2013–14	Kloten Flyers	NLA	39	14	25	39	44	16	5	9	14	22
2014–15	Kloten Flyers	NLA	39	9	15	24	42	—	—	—	—	—
2015–16	Kloten Flyers	NLA	48	13	26	39	50	4	0	2	2	6
NHL totals			63	2	7	9	46	1	0	0	0	0

=== International ===
Year	Team	Event	Result	GP	G	A	Pts	PIM
1999	Finland	WJC	5th	6	1	1	2	6
2003	Finland	WC	5th	7	0	1	1	6
2006	Finland	WC	3rd place, bronze medalist(s)	1	0	0	0	2
2009	Finland	WC	5th	7	0	0	0	4
2010	Finland	WC	6th	6	0	0	0	4
Junior totals				6	1	1	2	6
Senior totals				21	0	1	1	16

== Transactions ==
- June 26, 1999 — Drafted by the Atlanta Thrashers in the 9th round, 245th overall.
- June 14, 2006 — Traded to the Vancouver Canucks along with a 5th round pick in the 2007 NHL entry draft for a conditional draft pick in the 2007 NHL entry draft.
