= Stephen Weiss =

Canadian ice hockey player (born 1983)

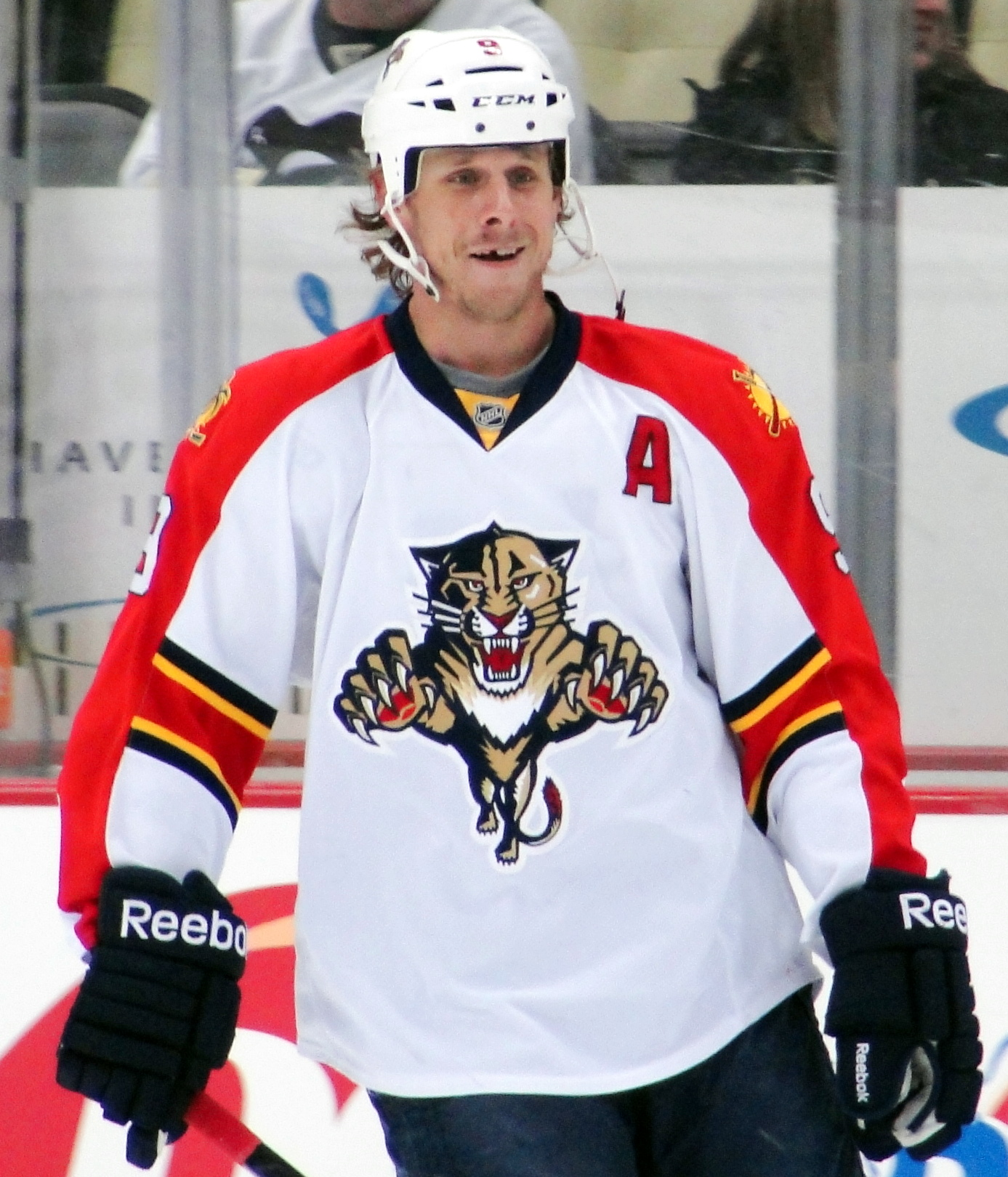
- Weiss with the Florida Panthers in 2012
- Born: April 3, 1983 (age 43) Toronto, Ontario, Canada
- Height: 5 ft 11 in (180 cm)
- Weight: 185 lb (84 kg; 13 st 3 lb)
- Position: Centre
- Shot: Left
- Played for: Florida Panthers; Detroit Red Wings
- NHL draft: 4th overall, 2001; Florida Panthers
- Playing career: 2001–2015

Stephen Weiss (born April 3, 1983) is a Canadian former professional ice hockey centre who most recently played for the Detroit Red Wings, as well as the Florida Panthers, who drafted him fourth overall in the 2001 NHL entry draft. Weiss held the Panthers franchise records for games played and led the franchise in assists when he retired.

== Early life ==
Weiss was born on April 3, 1983, in Toronto, Ontario, to parents Karl and Linda. Growing up, he was a fan of the Toronto Maple Leafs and Detroit Red Wings. As Weiss' uncle Steve Spott was friends with National Hockey League player Adam Graves, he also grew up idolizing the forward.

== Playing career ==
=== Plymouth Whalers ===
Weiss played his major junior career with the Plymouth Whalers of the Ontario Hockey League (OHL), recording statistics that impressed scouts and made him one of the highest-ranked skaters in the North American Central Scouting Report. In his rookie season, Weiss recorded 66 points, impressive enough for placement on the OHL First All-Rookie Team. Weiss continued to post eye-popping numbers in his sophomore season by recording 87 points and earning a top-five position among North American skaters.

As a result of his junior accolades, Weiss was drafted fourth overall by the Florida Panthers in the 2001 NHL entry draft. He returned to the Whalers in 2001–02, and although his point totals decreased from the previous year, he posted a respectable 70 points.

=== Florida Panthers (2001-2013) ===
After the Plymouth Whalers were eliminated from the 2002 OHL playoffs, Weiss signed a professional tryout agreement to finish the 2001–02 season with the Panthers. He made his NHL debut on April 2, 2002, his 19th birthday, and scored his first NHL goal that night against the Pittsburgh Penguins. He added one assist over the next six games before suffering a knee injury against the Tampa Bay Lightning on April 14. Two days later, Weiss signed a three-year, entry-level contract with the Panthers.

Due to his knee injury, Weiss was limited in his offseason training and only began skating in July. He also gained weight during his rehabilitation and began the Panthers' 2002 training camp at 180 pounds. During the Panthers preseason games, head coach Mike Keenan and general manager Rick Dudley expressed their concerns about his ability to play at the NHL level. Weiss began the 2002–03 season with the Panthers and tallied two assists over his first three games. While he was originally informed he would be returned to the Whalers on 16 October, after his third game, Keenan reversed his decision the following day. This act drew backlash from members of the media and Weiss' agent who criticized Keenan for playing "mind games" with a young player. By the end of October, Weiss had tallied three assists and no points over seven games. In December, Hockey Canada asked the Panthers to release Weiss so he could represent Team Canada at the 2003 World Junior Ice Hockey Championships, but the Panthers refused. Weiss was chosen to represent the Panthers at the 2003 National Hockey League YoungStars Game, where he scored two goals and an assist. After playing in 58 consecutive games, Weiss was forced to miss his first game of the season in mid-February due to a broken toe. Weiss finished his rookie season with six goals and 15 assists through 77 games. While Keenan encouraged him to spend the offseason solely working with the Panthers' strength and conditioning coach, Weiss agreed to split his time between his personal trainer in Toronto and South Florida. Keenan was specifically concerned with Weiss' small size and threatened to return Weiss to his junior team if he arrived at training camp unprepared for the season.

In part due to the signing of Nathan Horton, Weiss was reassigned to the Panthers American Hockey League (AHL) affiliate, the San Antonio Rampage, to start the 2003–04 season. He quickly led the team in scoring with four goals and two assists through his first eight games. Weiss returned to the Panthers lineup on November 7 after tallying nine points over his 10-game stint. He scored his first goal of the season that night to lead the Panthers to a 6–3 win over the Pittsburgh Penguins. After Keenan was fired on November 9, Weiss was promoted to the Panthers' second line with Valeri Bure and Kristian Huselius. By the end of November, Weiss had tallied seven goals and five assists over 11 games. Weiss, Bure, and Huselius became a dependable trio for the Panthers throughout November and December. By early January, Weiss led the three with 16 points and tied Bure with eight goals. However, numerous injuries suffered over the second half of the season limited Weiss to only 50 games. His first injury occurred on February 1, 2004, due to a knee-on-knee collision during a game against the New York Islanders. He then suffered a broken tibia at the end of March after blocking a shot from Carolina Hurricanes defenseman Sean Hill. At the time of the injury, Weiss ranked third on the team in scoring with 12 goals and 17 assists.

Weiss underwent leg surgery during the offseason and skated for the first time since March on September 26, 2004. While recovering, the NHL entered into a lockout with its players and cancelled the 2004–05 NHL season. However, since Weiss was still on his entry-level contract, he was eligible to play in the AHL during the lockout. Through the Rampage's first 12 games, Weiss led the team with three goals and eight assists. He was swiftly promoted to the Rampage's top line with Juraj Kolnik and Gregory Campbell and finished December with seven goals and 13 assists. He scored consistently throughout the remainder of the season and led the team with 15 goals and 23 assists through 62 games. Despite his efforts, however, the Rampage still failed to qualify for the 2005 Calder Cup playoffs. As such, Weiss and Bouwmeester were loaned to the second-place Chicago Wolves for the remainder of the season to gain experience in the postseason. After being held scoreless in his debut on March 11, Weiss recorded six goals and eight assists through the next 12 straight games. He finished the regular season with seven goals and nine assists for Chicago to help the Wolves clinch their franchise's first West Division title. In his first professional postseason, Weiss recorded two goals and seven assists en route to the 2005 Calder Cup Finals.

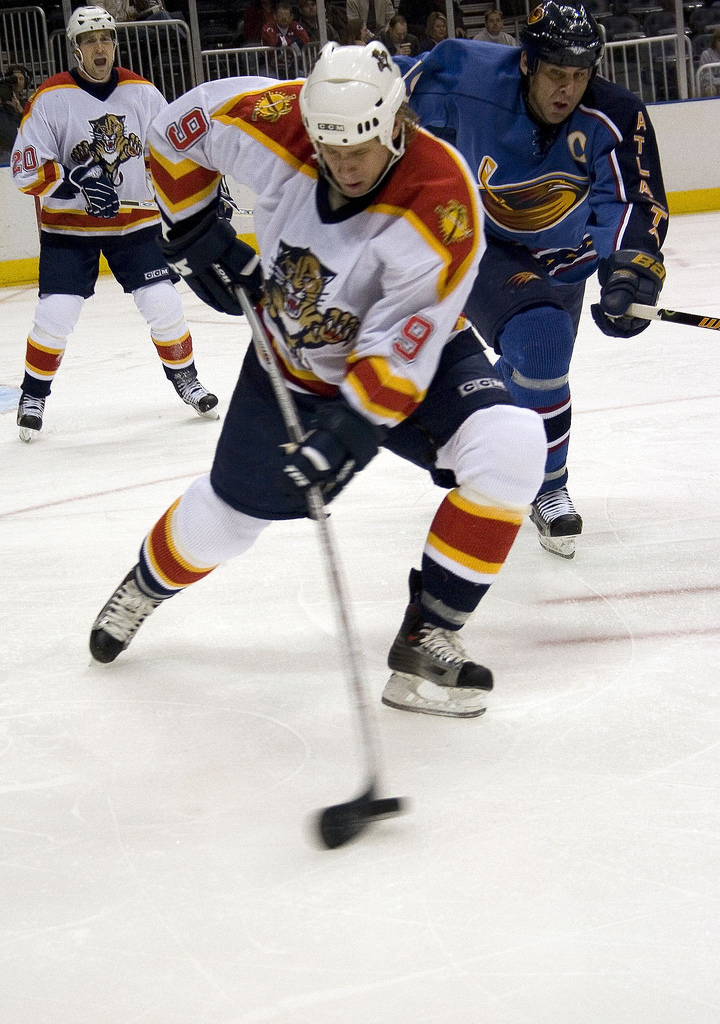
Weiss with the Florida Panthers during the 2005–06 season.

When the NHL returned for the 2005–06 season, Weiss re-signed with the Panthers as a restricted free agent. While he started as the Panthers third-line centerman, he was promoted to the first line following an injury to Joe Nieuwendyk. In this role, he ranked fourth on the team in scoring with four goals and five assists. However, his season was cut short due to a wrist injury that required surgery. At the time of the injury, he was tied for fourth on the team in scoring with nine goals and 21 points. He stayed out of the Panthers lineup for the remainder of the season but practiced with the team in April in case they qualified for the 2006 Stanley Cup playoffs. After failing to qualify for the playoffs, the Panthers signed Weiss to a one-year contract extension.

The following season, Weiss returned to the Panthers lineup, but again missed significant time due to knee and shoulder injuries. He then signed a six-year contract extension with the Panthers during the off-season. Weiss, looking to improve on his showing, followed up his efforts by recording 13 goals and 29 assists in 74 games, despite missing time due to the flu and shoulder injuries.

The 2008–09 season was seen as a break-out year for Weiss, as he flourished under new head coach Peter DeBoer, his former coach in the OHL. In that year, he played a career-high 78 games and recorded a career-high 47 assists. Weiss was also able to stay healthy, despite missing four games with a groin injury. The following season, Weiss continued his pace by recording a career-high 28 goals along with 32 assists in a career-high 80 games. In 2010–11, Weiss saw his production dip to 49 points, however, and he became a target of recurring trade rumours throughout the year.

On February 23, 2012, Weiss set a franchise record by playing in his 614th game in a Panthers jersey. He was honoured in a ceremony on February 26, 2012, before a home game against the Montreal Canadiens; he scored two goals that night, including the game winner. After 637 career games without a postseason appearance, Weiss helped the Panthers qualify for the Stanley Cup playoffs for the first time since the 1999–2000 season. He scored his first two postseason goals in Game 4 to lead the Panthers over the New Jersey Devils in Game 4. He finished with three goals and two assists in the Panthers' seven-game series loss to the Devils in the Eastern Conference Quarter-finals.

=== Detroit Red Wings (2013-2015) ===
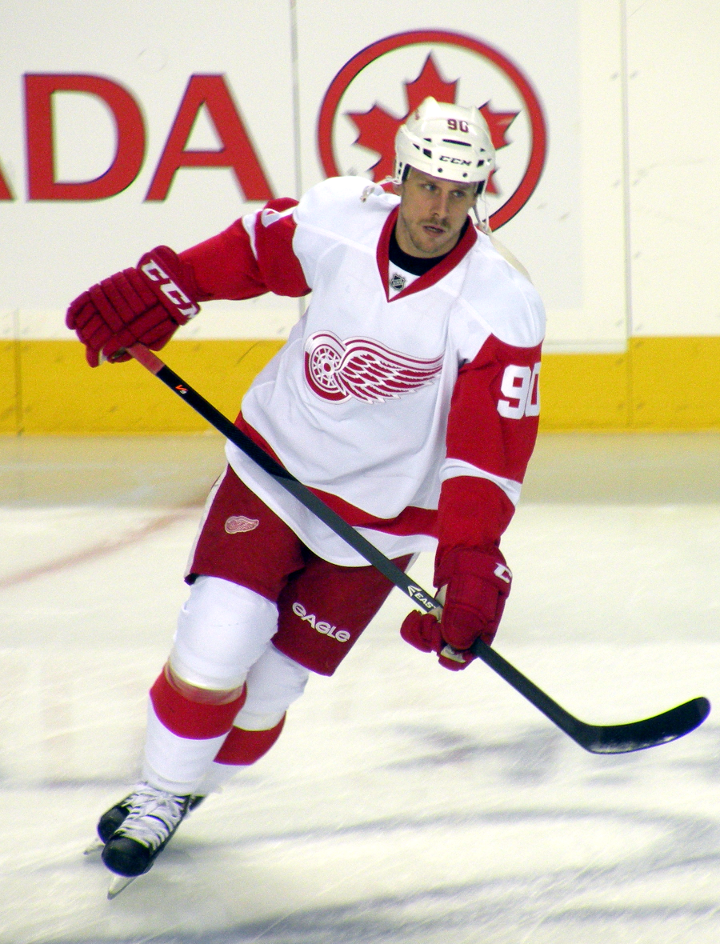
Weiss during his tenure with the Detroit Red Wings.

On July 5, 2013, Weiss signed a five-year, $24.5 million contract as an unrestricted free agent with the Detroit Red Wings. With jersey number 9 retired by Detroit, Weiss switched to number 90. During Weiss' first season with the Red Wings, he was limited to just 26 games due to a hernia injury and subsequent surgery. He was assigned to the Red Wings AHL affiliate, the Grand Rapids Griffins, to start the 2014–15 season but was recalled to the NHL on October 30, 2014.

On June 30, 2015, the Red Wings bought out the final three years of Weiss's contract, releasing him to free agency.

== International play ==
Weiss represented Team Canada at the 2002 IIHF World U20 Championships. He recorded a goal and three assists and earned a silver medal as Canada lost to Russia in the gold medal game.

== Career statistics ==
=== Regular season and playoffs ===
			Regular season					Playoffs
Season	Team	League	GP	G	A	Pts	PIM	GP	G	A	Pts	PIM
1998–99	North York Rangers	OPJHL	35	15	22	37	10	—	—	—	—	—
1999–2000	Plymouth Whalers	OHL	64	24	42	66	35	23	8	18	26	18
2000–01	Plymouth Whalers	OHL	62	40	47	87	45	18	7	16	23	10
2001–02	Florida Panthers	NHL	7	1	1	2	0	—	—	—	—	—
2001–02	Plymouth Whalers	OHL	46	25	45	70	69	6	2	7	9	13
2002–03	Florida Panthers	NHL	77	6	15	21	17	—	—	—	—	—
2003–04	San Antonio Rampage	AHL	10	6	3	9	14	—	—	—	—	—
2003–04	Florida Panthers	NHL	50	12	17	29	10	—	—	—	—	—
2004–05	San Antonio Rampage	AHL	62	15	23	38	38	—	—	—	—	—
2004–05	Chicago Wolves	AHL	18	7	9	16	12	18	2	7	9	17
2005–06	Florida Panthers	NHL	41	9	12	21	22	—	—	—	—	—
2006–07	Florida Panthers	NHL	74	20	28	48	28	—	—	—	—	—
2007–08	Florida Panthers	NHL	74	13	29	42	40	—	—	—	—	—
2008–09	Florida Panthers	NHL	78	14	47	61	22	—	—	—	—	—
2009–10	Florida Panthers	NHL	80	28	32	60	40	—	—	—	—	—
2010–11	Florida Panthers	NHL	76	21	28	49	49	—	—	—	—	—
2011–12	Florida Panthers	NHL	80	20	37	57	60	7	3	2	5	6
2012–13	Florida Panthers	NHL	17	1	3	4	25	—	—	—	—	—
2013–14	Detroit Red Wings	NHL	26	2	2	4	12	—	—	—	—	—
2014–15	Grand Rapids Griffins	AHL	3	2	0	2	0	—	—	—	—	—
2014–15	Detroit Red Wings	NHL	52	9	16	25	16	2	0	0	0	0
NHL totals			732	156	267	423	341	9	3	2	5	6

=== International ===
Medal record

Representing Canada

Ice hockey

World Junior Championships
Silver medal – second place	2002 Pardubice	

Year	Team	Event	Result	GP	G	A	Pts	PIM
2000	Canada Ontario	U17	2nd place, silver medalist(s)	5	7	2	9	2
2002	Canada	WJC	2nd place, silver medalist(s)	6	3	1	4	6
Junior totals				11	10	3	13	8

Awards and achievements
Preceded by Denis Shvidki	Florida Panthers first-round draft pick 2001	Succeeded by Jay Bouwmeester
