= Ajay Baines =

Canadian ice hockey player

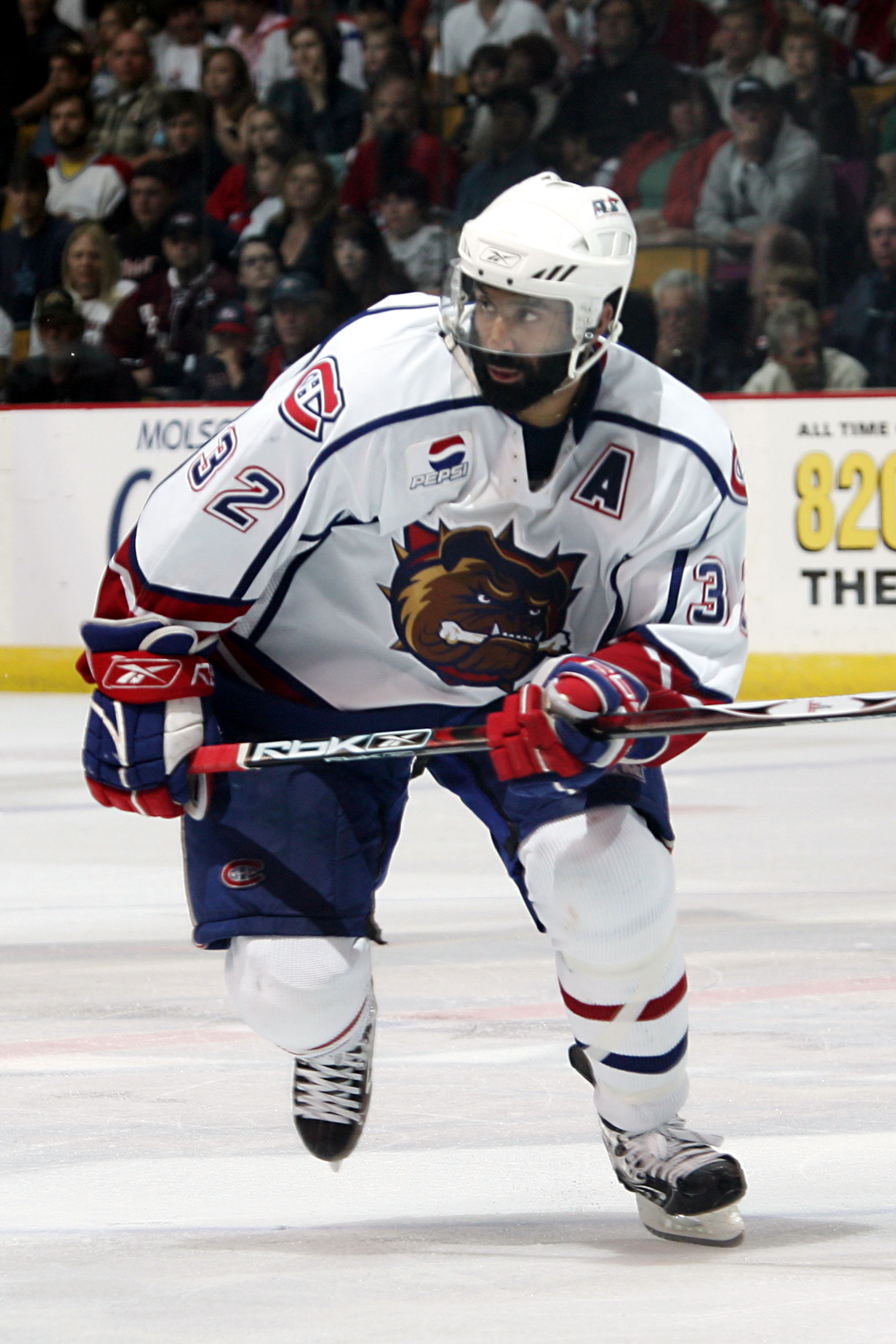
- Baines with the Hamilton Bulldogs in 2007
- Born: March 25, 1978 (age 47) Kamloops, British Columbia, Canada
- Height: 5 ft 10 in (178 cm)
- Weight: 178 lb (81 kg; 12 st 10 lb)
- Position: Centre
- Shot: Left
- Played for: Greenville Grrrowl; Norfolk Admirals; Omaha Ak-Sar-Ben Knights; Hamilton Bulldogs; Iowa Chops
- Playing career: 1999–2009

Ajay Baines (born March 25, 1978) is a Canadian former professional ice hockey centre who played most recently for the Iowa Chops in the AHL.

== Playing career ==
=== Junior ===
Baines spent four seasons with the Kamloops Blazers of the WHL, serving as captain for three seasons. Baines was the youngest player ever to be named captain of the Blazers.

=== Professional ===
Baines began his professional career with the Greenville Grrrowl of the ECHL during the 1999-00 season. After the season, he would make the jump to the AHL, where he would spend the rest of his career, including winning the Calder Cup with the Hamilton Bulldogs during the 2006-07 season.

== Awards and achievements ==
Award	Season
Fred T. Hunt Memorial Award	2008-09
