= Frédéric Cassivi =

Canadian ice hockey player

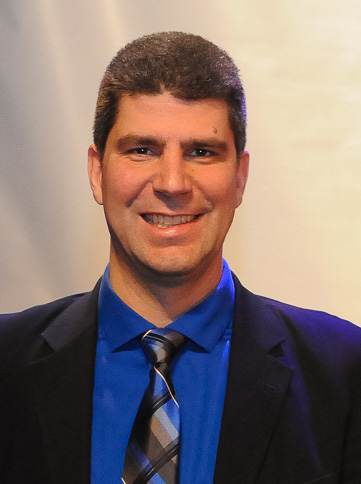
- Cassivi in 2015
- Born: June 12, 1975 (age 51) Sorel-Tracy, Quebec, Canada
- Height: 6 ft 4 in (193 cm)
- Weight: 220 lb (100 kg; 15 st 10 lb)
- Position: Goaltender
- Caught: Left
- Played for: Atlanta Thrashers; Washington Capitals; Nürnberg Ice Tigers; Vienna Capitals
- NHL draft: 210th overall, 1994; Ottawa Senators
- Playing career: 1995–2013

Frédéric Cassivi (born June 12, 1975) is a Canadian former professional ice hockey goaltender who played in the National Hockey League (NHL) with the Atlanta Thrashers and Washington Capitals. A two-time winner of the Calder Cup in the American Hockey League (AHL), Cassivi was inducted to the AHL Hall of Fame in 2015.

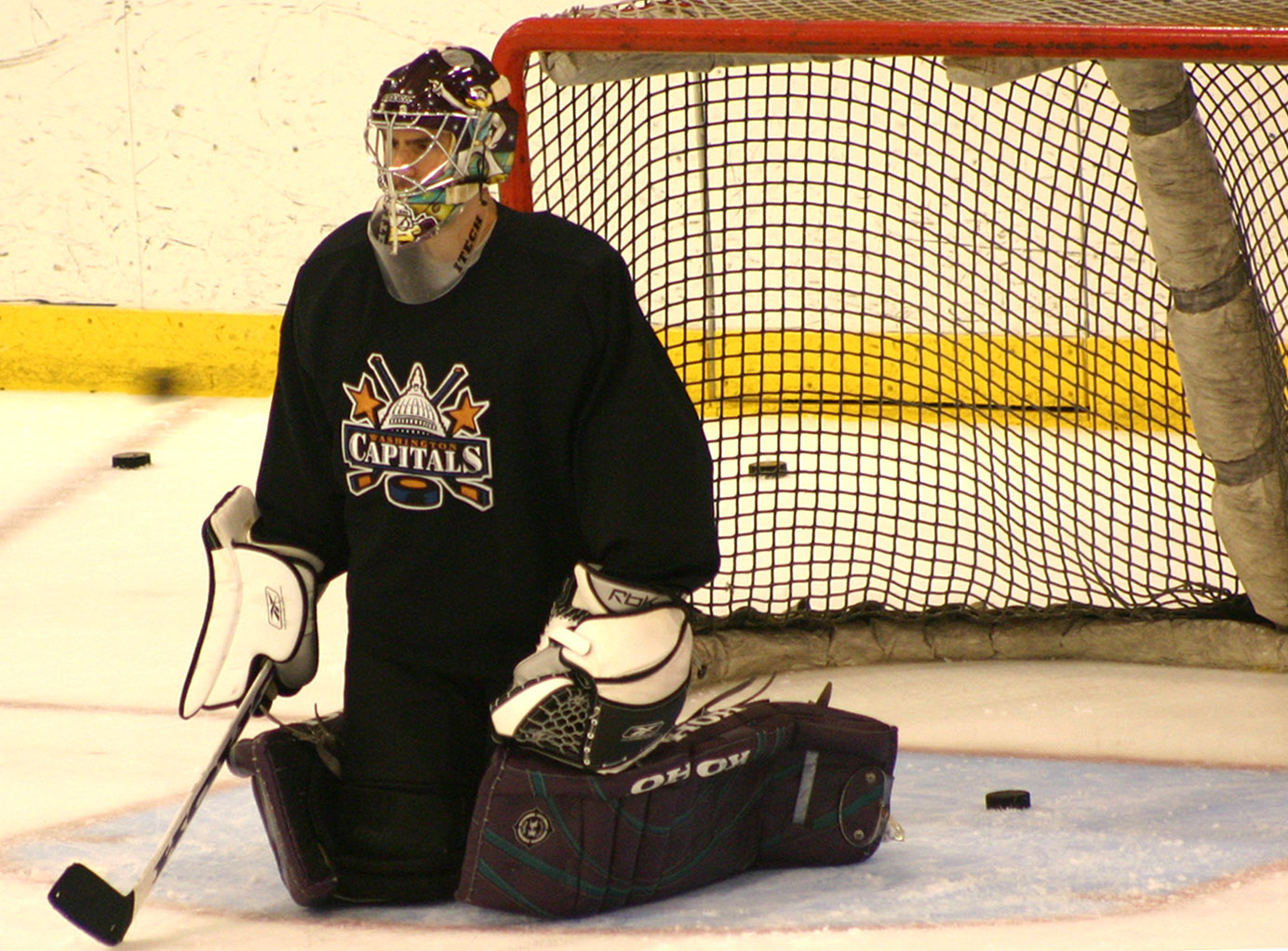
Cassivi with the Washington Capitals in 2005

== Playing career ==
As a youth, Cassivi played in the 1989 Quebec International Pee-Wee Hockey Tournament with a minor ice hockey team from Francheville, Quebec.

Cassivi was originally drafted at the 1994 NHL entry draft in the 9th round, 210th overall, by the Ottawa Senators. Cassivi spent several years in the minors before signing with the Colorado Avalanche in 1999 as a free agent, although he would play primarily for their minor league affiliate, the Hershey Bears.

He was traded by the Avalanche to the Atlanta Thrashers in 2002 and would actually make the Thrashers lineup for parts of two seasons. He primarily saw ice time with their AHL affiliate, the Chicago Wolves. He played for the Chicago Wolves for 3 seasons, 2001–02, 2002–03 and 2003–04. He then played for the AHL Cincinnati Mighty Ducks for the 2004–05 season and posted a season best save percentage of 0.924 and GA of 2.07 with 10 SO, while winning 25 games.

For 2005–06, Cassivi returned to the AHL Hershey Bears and the Washington Capitals and posted his most wins during the regular season, 34, en route to winning the AHL Calder Cup. Cassivi earned the Calder Cup Playoff MVP award, the Jack A. Butterfield Trophy, for his strong play in net during the series. Cassivi ranks fifth all-time in league wins (232) and is tied for eighth all-time in shutouts (24). He also ranks fifth all-time in Hershey wins with 113, fifth in appearances with 246 and seventh in shutouts with nine.

Cassivi ended his professional career in Austria, appearing in 51 games with the Vienna Capitals of the Austrian Hockey League in the 2009–10 season. He briefly came out of retirement in the 2012–13 season, giving relief to the Reading Royals in the ECHL. He also served as an emergency backup the following season.

== Career statistics ==
			Regular season									Playoffs
Season	Team	League	GP	W	L	T/OT	MIN	GA	SO	GAA	SV%	GP	W	L	MIN	GA	SO	GAA	SV%
1991–92	Abitibi Forestiers	QMAAA	22	5	17	0	1320	106	0	4.84	—	3	1	2	180	15	0	5.06	—
1993–94	Victoriaville Tigres	QMJHL	15	2	8	2	—	—	0	5.77	.868	—	—	—	—	—	—	—	—
1993–94	St. Hyacinthe Lasers	QMJHL	20	14	5	1	—	—	1	2.34	.917	1	0	0	8	2	0	15.00	.714
1994–95	Halifax Mooseheads	QMJHL	24	9	12	1	1362	105	0	4.63	.881	—	—	—	—	—	—	—	—
1994–95	St. Jean Lynx	QMJHL	19	12	6	0	1021	55	1	3.23	.887	5	2	3	258	18	0	4.19	.887
1995–96	Thunder Bay Senators	CoHL	12	6	4	2	715	51	0	4.28	.872	—	—	—	—	—	—	—	—
1995–96	Prince Edward Island Senators	AHL	41	20	14	3	2347	128	1	3.27	.901	5	2	3	317	24	0	4.54	.848
1996–97	Syracuse Crunch	AHL	55	23	22	8	3069	164	2	3.21	.889	1	0	1	60	3	0	3.01	.893
1997–98	Worcester IceCats	AHL	45	20	22	2	2593	140	1	3.24	.891	6	3	3	326	18	0	3.31	.901
1998–99	Cincinnati Cyclones	IHL	44	21	17	2	2418	123	1	3.05	.903	3	1	2	139	6	0	2.59	.917
1999–00	Hershey Bears	AHL	31	14	9	3	1554	78	1	3.01	.905	2	0	1	63	5	0	4.75	.865
2000–01	Hershey Bears	AHL	49	17	24	3	2620	124	2	2.84	.906	9	7	2	564	14	1	1.49	.952
2001–02	Hershey Bears	AHL	21	6	10	4	1201	50	0	2.50	.919	—	—	—	—	—	—	—	—
2001–02	Chicago Wolves	AHL	12	6	2	1	625	26	0	2.50	.920	5	2	2	264	11	0	2.50	.923
2001–02	Atlanta Thrashers	NHL	6	2	3	0	307	17	0	3.32	.918	—	—	—	—	—	—	—	—
2002–03	Chicago Wolves	AHL	21	10	8	1	1171	62	0	3.18	.892	2	0	2	90	3	0	2.00	.925
2002–03	Atlanta Thrashers	NHL	2	1	1	0	123	11	0	5.37	.810	—	—	—	—	—	—	—	—
2003–04	Chicago Wolves	AHL	34	15	12	5	1911	82	1	2.57	.920	—	—	—	—	—	—	—	—
2004–05	Cincinnati Mighty Ducks	AHL	46	25	18	2	2549	88	10	2.07	.924	8	2	4	444	21	0	2.84	.903
2005–06	Hershey Bears	AHL	61	34	19	6	3538	153	3	2.59	.908	21	16	5	1316	46	4	2.10	.931
2005–06	Washington Capitals	NHL	1	0	1	0	59	4	0	4.09	.867	—	—	—	—	—	—	—	—
2006–07	Hershey Bears	AHL	39	22	10	5	2286	90	3	2.36	.921	19	13	6	1169	51	1	2.62	.908
2006–07	Washington Capitals	NHL	4	0	1	1	139	6	0	2.60	.897	—	—	—	—	—	—	—	—
2007–08	Hershey Bears	AHL	45	20	20	4	2594	138	0	3.19	.901	5	1	3	233	19	0	4.02	.860
2008–09	Nürnberg Ice Tigers	DEL	46	20	18	0	2699	124	3	2.76	.911	5	1	4	296	17	0	3.44	.902
2009–10	Vienna Capitals	EBEL	51	—	—	—	—	—	—	2.78	.910	12	—	—	—	—	—	3.09	.868
2012–13	Reading Royals	ECHL	1	0	1	0	58	5	0	5.22	.808	—	—	—	—	—	—	—	—
NHL totals			13	3	6	1	628	38	0	3.64	.892	—	—	—	—	—	—	—	—

== Awards and honours ==
Award	Year
AHL
All-Star Game	2001
Calder Cup (Chicago Wolves)	2002
Jack A. Butterfield Trophy	2006
Calder Cup (Hershey Bears)	2006
Hall of Fame	2015
