= Pat Leahy (ice hockey) =

American ice hockey player

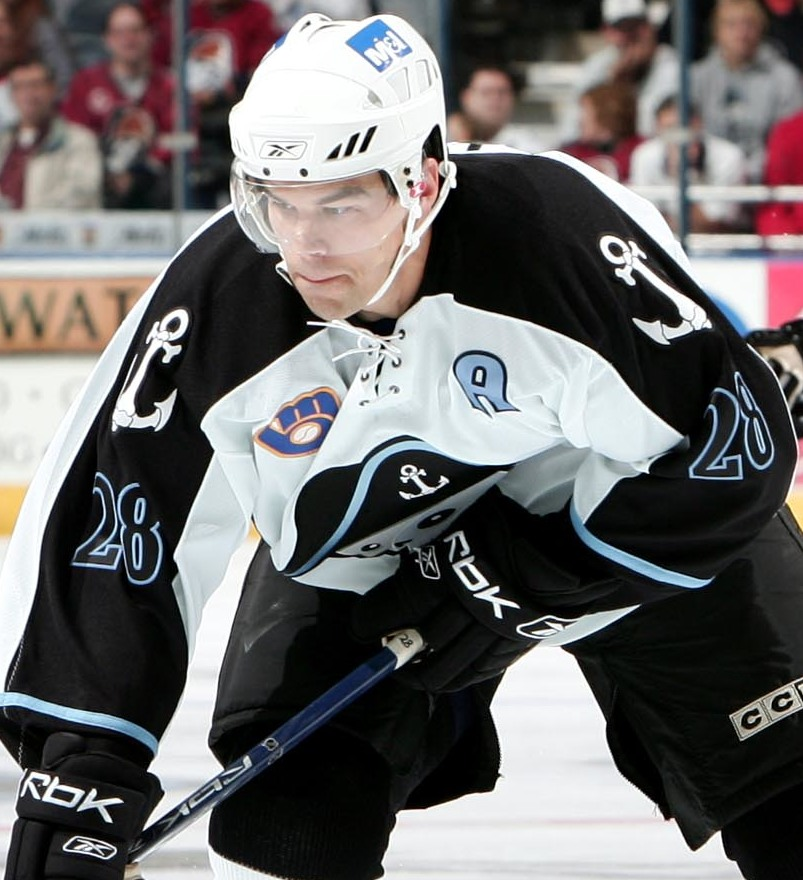
- Leahy with the Milwaukee Admirals in 2006
- Born: June 9, 1979 (age 47) Brighton, Massachusetts, U.S.
- Height: 6 ft 3 in (191 cm)
- Weight: 200 lb (91 kg; 14 st 4 lb)
- Position: Right wing
- Shot: Right
- Played for: Boston Bruins; Nashville Predators; EHC Black Wings Linz
- NHL draft: 122nd overall, 1998; New York Rangers
- Playing career: 2001–2014

Patrick Donald Leahy (born June 9, 1979 in Brighton, Massachusetts) is an American former professional ice hockey right wing who played in the National Hockey League (NHL) with the Boston Bruins and the Nashville Predators before spending the rest of career abroad with EHC Black Wings Linz of the Austrian Hockey League.

== Playing career ==
Leahy originally played hockey at Boston College High School of the Catholic High School Conference. During his time at BC High, Leahy set a school record for points in career (with 140), was named to the Boston Globe and Boston Herald Dream Teams as a senior, and was honored with the titles of team captain and MVP.

After being drafted in the 5th round, 122nd overall, at the 1998 NHL entry draft by the New York Rangers, Leahy spent 4 years playing college hockey for Miami University in Oxford, Ohio before he turned pro in 2001. During his first year of professional hockey, Leahy played for four pro teams, including the Trenton Titans of the ECHL, the Hershey Bears, the Portland Pirates and the Bridgeport Sound Tigers of the American Hockey League. After bouncing around during the 2001–02 season, Leahy settled with the Providence Bruins for the entire 2002–03 season before signing with NHL affiliate, the Boston Bruins the following season on July 28, 2003.

During the 2003–04, Leahy made his NHL debut with the Bruins against the Philadelphia Flyers on December 6, 2003. After 6 scoreless games with Boston he was returned to the P-Bruins. Remaining with Providence through the 2004 NHL Lockout, Pat made the Bruins opening roster for the 2005–06 season and on October 8, 2005, he scored his first NHL goal (unassisted) against the Pittsburgh Penguins. In 43 games with Boston he scored 4 goals for 8 points before reassigned to Providence.

On July 17, 2006, Leahy left the Bruins organization and signed a one-year contract as a free agent with the Nashville Predators. Making just a single appearance with the Predators during the 2006–07 season, Leahy was assigned to AHL affiliate, the Milwaukee Admirals of the majority of the year.

Unable to establish an NHL spot after six professional seasons, Leahy signed with European team EHC Black Wings Linz of the Austrian Hockey League. Leahy spent the last 7 seasons of his career with Linz, culminating with a Championship in 2012 before retiring at the end of the 2013–14 season.

== Career statistics ==
			Regular season					Playoffs
Season	Team	League	GP	G	A	Pts	PIM	GP	G	A	Pts	PIM
1997–98	Miami RedHawks	CCHA	28	0	1	1	24	—	—	—	—	—
1998–99	Miami RedHawks	CCHA	34	10	20	30	40	—	—	—	—	—
1999–00	Miami RedHawks	CCHA	36	16	22	38	89	—	—	—	—	—
2000–01	Miami RedHawks	CCHA	37	13	19	32	52	—	—	—	—	—
2001–02	Trenton Titans	ECHL	41	20	21	41	64	—	—	—	—	—
2001–02	Hershey Bears	AHL	9	1	2	3	8	—	—	—	—	—
2001–02	Portland Pirates	AHL	9	1	1	2	8	—	—	—	—	—
2001–02	Bridgeport Sound Tigers	AHL	14	2	2	4	2	20	3	4	7	4
2002–03	Providence Bruins	AHL	66	20	23	43	63	4	1	0	1	18
2003–04	Providence Bruins	AHL	55	14	16	30	37	2	0	0	0	0
2003–04	Boston Bruins	NHL	6	0	0	0	0	—	—	—	—	—
2004–05	Providence Bruins	AHL	38	1	14	15	18	17	4	6	10	20
2005–06	Boston Bruins	NHL	43	4	4	8	1	—	—	—	—	—
2005–06	Providence Bruins	AHL	4	1	2	3	4	—	—	—	—	—
2006–07	Milwaukee Admirals	AHL	52	10	20	30	30	3	1	1	2	2
2006–07	Nashville Predators	NHL	1	0	0	0	0	—	—	—	—	—
2007–08	EHC Black Wings Linz	EBEL	44	20	25	45	44	11	3	6	9	14
2008–09	EHC Black Wings Linz	EBEL	54	18	25	43	62	6	2	0	2	4
2009–10	EHC Black Wings Linz	EBEL	50	24	39	63	90	18	7	11	18	28
2010–11	EHC Black Wings Linz	EBEL	50	14	25	39	38	5	1	1	2	4
2011–12	EHC Black Wings Linz	EBEL	37	12	24	36	46	13	1	6	7	6
2012–13	EHC Black Wings Linz	EBEL	43	24	26	50	16	13	3	3	6	14
2013–14	EHC Black Wings Linz	EBEL	42	17	17	34	10	8	3	1	4	10
AHL totals			243	49	78	127	166	46	9	11	20	44
NHL totals			50	4	4	8	19	—	—	—	—	—
