= Paul Gaustad =

American ice hockey player (born 1982)

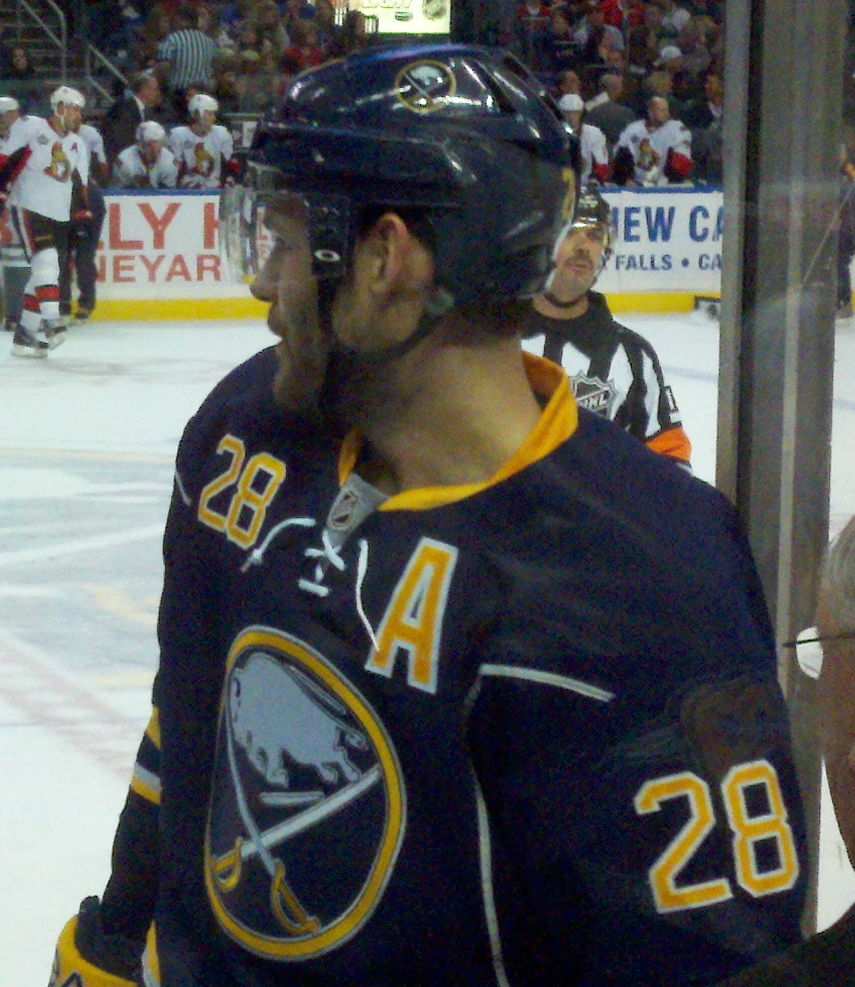
- Gaustad with the Buffalo Sabres in 2011
- Born: February 3, 1982 (age 44) Fargo, North Dakota, U.S.
- Height: 6 ft 5 in (196 cm)
- Weight: 227 lb (103 kg; 16 st 3 lb)
- Position: Center
- Shot: Left
- Played for: Buffalo Sabres; Nashville Predators
- National team: United States
- NHL draft: 220th overall, 2000; Buffalo Sabres
- Playing career: 2002–2016

Paul Michael Gaustad (born February 3, 1982) is an American former professional ice hockey centerman who played for the Nashville Predators and Buffalo Sabres of the National Hockey League (NHL). He is nicknamed "Goose."

== Playing career ==
=== Junior ===
Gaustad was drafted in the seventh round, 220th overall, by the Buffalo Sabres in the 2000 NHL entry draft. In the off-season, he lives in Portland, Oregon. He also played for the Portland Winter Hawks of the Western Hockey League (WHL).

Prior to joining Portland in 1999–2000, Gaustad was a Portland Jr. Hawk. Afterward, Gaustad started playing for a Tier II team in Burnaby, British Columbia, of the British Columbia Junior Hockey League (BCJHL). In his three seasons with the Winter Hawks, he registered 135 points (53 goals and 82 assists) before making his professional debut with the Sabres' American Hockey League (AHL) affiliate, the Rochester Americans, in 2002–03.

=== Professional ===
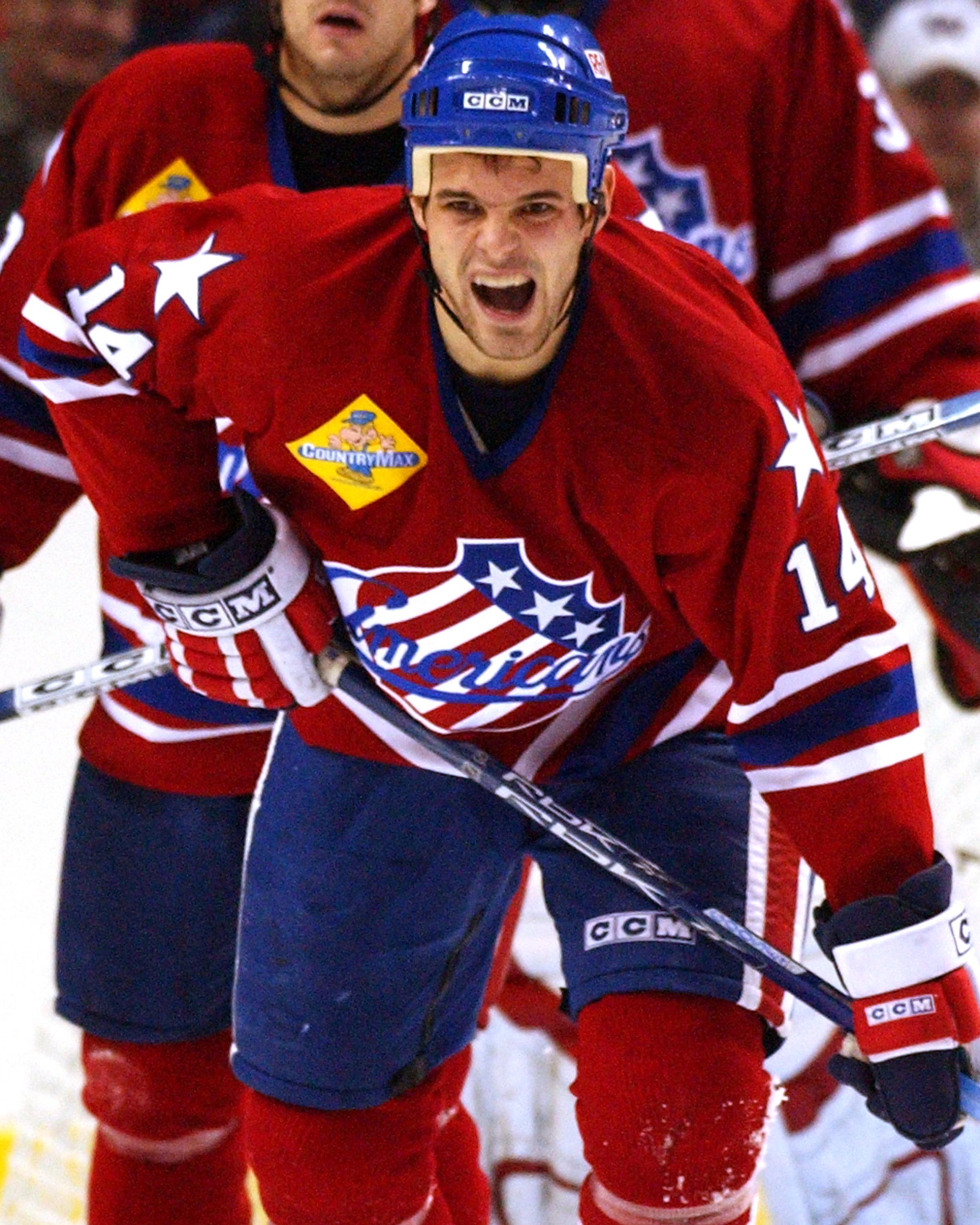
Gaustad with the Rochester Americans in 2004

Upon his arrival in Rochester, Gaustad registered 53 points (14 goals and 39 assists) in 80 games while also seeing his first action with the parent club, the Buffalo Sabres.

In the 2005–06 season, Gaustad secured a starting position with the Sabres, where he played mostly as fourth line center and played the power forward/enforcer role, along with teammates Adam Mair and Andrew Peters. Gaustad, who had worn the number 14 in Rochester, had to double his number to 28 in Buffalo, due to 14 being retired in honor of Sabres legend René Robert.

On February 7, 2007, in a game against the Ottawa Senators, Gaustad's leg was cut and his tendon was sliced in a collision with Dany Heatley, an injury which at the time was thought to have ended his season. It was later revealed that the injury could have even potentially ended his career had it been an inch deeper. However, he did recover ahead of schedule and joined the Sabres in their 2007 Stanley Cup playoffs on May 4, 2007, for Game 5 against the New York Rangers at home in Buffalo.

After a productive campaign during the 2007–08 season, in which he registered a solid 36 points while mainly on the third and fourth lines, Gaustad was re-signed by the Sabres to a four-year, $9.2 million contract extension on the eve of the free agency period, which was set for July 1, 2008.

On the ice, Gaustad is known for his teamwork and gritty play making him a popular favorite among fans. He is often in front of the net, capitalizing on his 6'5" frame to screen opposition goaltenders and deflect goals. Because of his size and ability, he typically plays a unit on the power play.

At the 2012 NHL trade deadline, on February 27, Gaustad and a 2013 fourth-round draft pick (Juuse Saros) were sent to the Nashville Predators in exchange for a 2012 first-round pick.

On September 8, 2016, Gaustad announced his retirement from the NHL after 12 seasons via his Instagram account.

== Personal life ==
Gaustad was born in Fargo, North Dakota and moved to Portland, Oregon, at a young age, which he considers his hometown.

== Career statistics ==
=== Regular season and playoffs ===
			Regular season					Playoffs
Season	Team	League	GP	G	A	Pts	PIM	GP	G	A	Pts	PIM
1998–99	Portland Jr. Hawks	U18 AA	45	47	53	100	81	—	—	—	—	—
1999–2000	Burnaby Bulldogs	BCHL	19	2	3	5	25	—	—	—	—	—
1999–2000	Portland Winter Hawks	WHL	56	6	8	14	110	—	—	—	—	—
2000–01	Portland Winter Hawks	WHL	70	11	30	41	168	16	10	6	16	59
2001–02	Portland Winter Hawks	WHL	72	36	44	80	202	6	3	1	4	16
2002–03	Rochester Americans	AHL	80	14	39	53	137	3	0	0	0	4
2002–03	Buffalo Sabres	NHL	1	0	0	0	0	—	—	—	—	—
2003–04	Rochester Americans	AHL	78	9	22	31	169	16	3	10	13	30
2004–05	Rochester Americans	AHL	76	18	25	43	192	9	6	5	11	16
2005–06	Buffalo Sabres	NHL	78	9	15	24	65	18	0	4	4	14
2006–07	Buffalo Sabres	NHL	54	9	13	22	74	7	0	1	1	2
2007–08	Buffalo Sabres	NHL	82	10	26	36	85	—	—	—	—	—
2008–09	Buffalo Sabres	NHL	62	12	17	29	108	—	—	—	—	—
2009–10	Buffalo Sabres	NHL	65	12	10	22	82	6	0	1	1	8
2010–11	Buffalo Sabres	NHL	81	12	19	31	101	7	0	2	2	13
2011–12	Buffalo Sabres	NHL	56	7	10	17	70	—	—	—	—	—
2011–12	Nashville Predators	NHL	14	0	4	4	6	10	1	1	2	5
2012–13	Nashville Predators	NHL	23	2	3	5	20	—	—	—	—	—
2013–14	Nashville Predators	NHL	75	10	11	21	61	—	—	—	—	—
2014–15	Nashville Predators	NHL	73	4	10	14	60	6	0	0	0	22
2015–16	Nashville Predators	NHL	63	2	4	6	46	14	1	0	1	0
AHL totals			234	41	86	127	498	28	9	15	24	50
NHL totals			727	89	142	231	778	68	2	9	11	64

=== International ===
Year	Team	Event	Result	GP	G	A	Pts	PIM
2011	United States	WC	8th	6	0	1	1	4
Senior totals				6	0	1	1	4
