= Paul Brown (ice hockey) =

Canadian ice hockey player

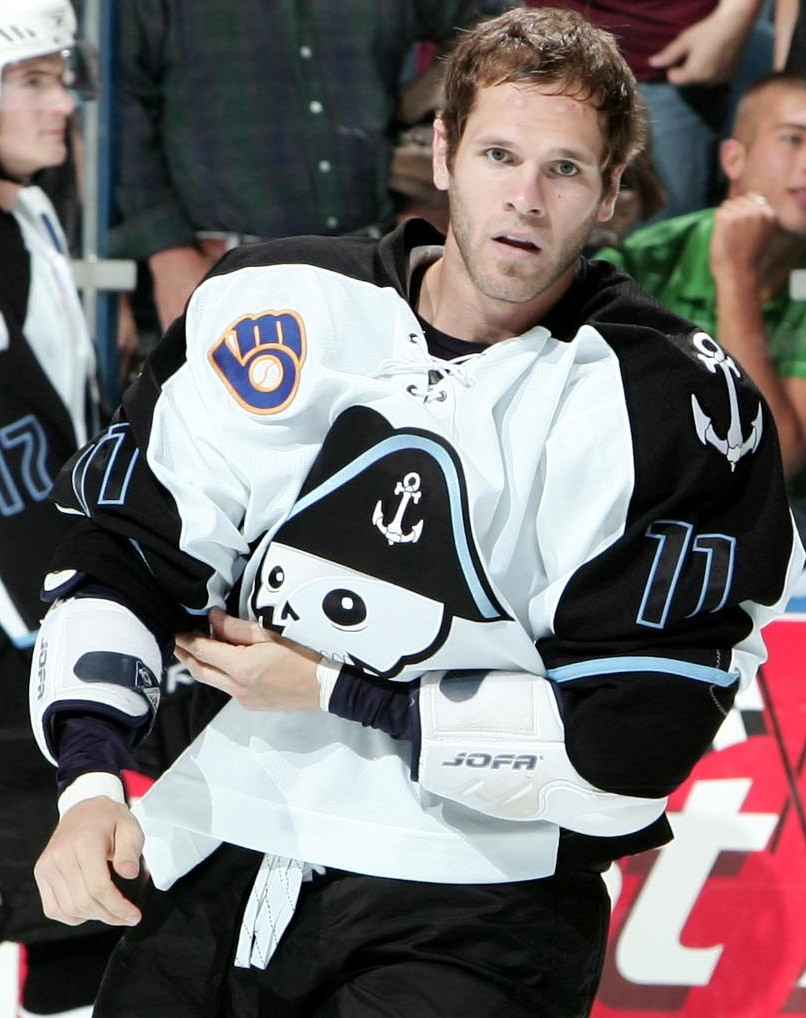
- Brown with the Milwaukee Admirals in 2006
- Born: July 21, 1984 (age 41) Edmonton, Alberta, Canada
- Height: 6 ft 3 in (191 cm)
- Weight: 195 lb (88 kg; 13 st 13 lb)
- Position: Left wing
- Shot: Right
- Played for: AHL; Milwaukee Admirals; ECHL; Trenton Titans; UHL; Rockford IceHogs
- NHL draft: 89th overall, 2003; Nashville Predators
- Playing career: 2004–2007

Paul Brown (born July 21, 1984) is a Canadian retired professional ice hockey player.

== Early life ==
Brown was born in Edmonton. He played major junior hockey in the Western Hockey League (WHL) with the Regina Pats and Kamloops Blazers, scoring 48 goals and 79 assists for 127 points, while earning 782 penalty minutes in 229 games played.

== Career ==
He was selected by the Nashville Predators in the 3rd round (89th overall) of the 2003 NHL entry draft. Brown went on to play three seasons of professional hockey, mostly in the American Hockey League with the Milwaukee Admirals, before retiring following the 2006–07 season.

== Career statistics ==
			Regular season					Playoffs
Season	Team	League	GP	G	A	Pts	PIM	GP	G	A	Pts	PIM
1999–2000	Regina Pats	WHL	3	0	0	0	0	—	—	—	—	—
2000–01	Regina Pats	WHL	33	3	1	4	83	—	—	—	—	—
2000–01	Kamloops Blazers	WHL	30	6	11	17	118	2	0	0	0	4
2001–02	Kamloops Blazers	WHL	37	7	12	19	130	1	0	0	0	0
2002–03	Kamloops Blazers	WHL	67	21	35	56	229	6	3	0	3	20
2003–04	Kamloops Blazers	WHL	59	11	20	31	222	5	0	1	1	13
2004–05	Milwaukee Admirals	AHL	20	2	3	5	90	7	2	0	2	25
2004–05	Trenton Titans	ECHL	20	2	4	6	63	—	—	—	—	—
2005–06	Milwaukee Admirals	AHL	41	3	1	4	59	18	0	0	0	27
2005–06	Rockford IceHogs	UHL	3	0	0	0	4	—	—	—	—	—
2006–07	Milwaukee Admirals	AHL	25	2	4	6	39	—	—	—	—	—
2006–07	Rockford IceHogs	UHL	26	7	9	16	114	14	1	1	2	20
AHL totals			86	8	7	15	188	25	2	0	2	52
