= Josh Green (ice hockey) =

Canadian ice hockey player (born 1977)

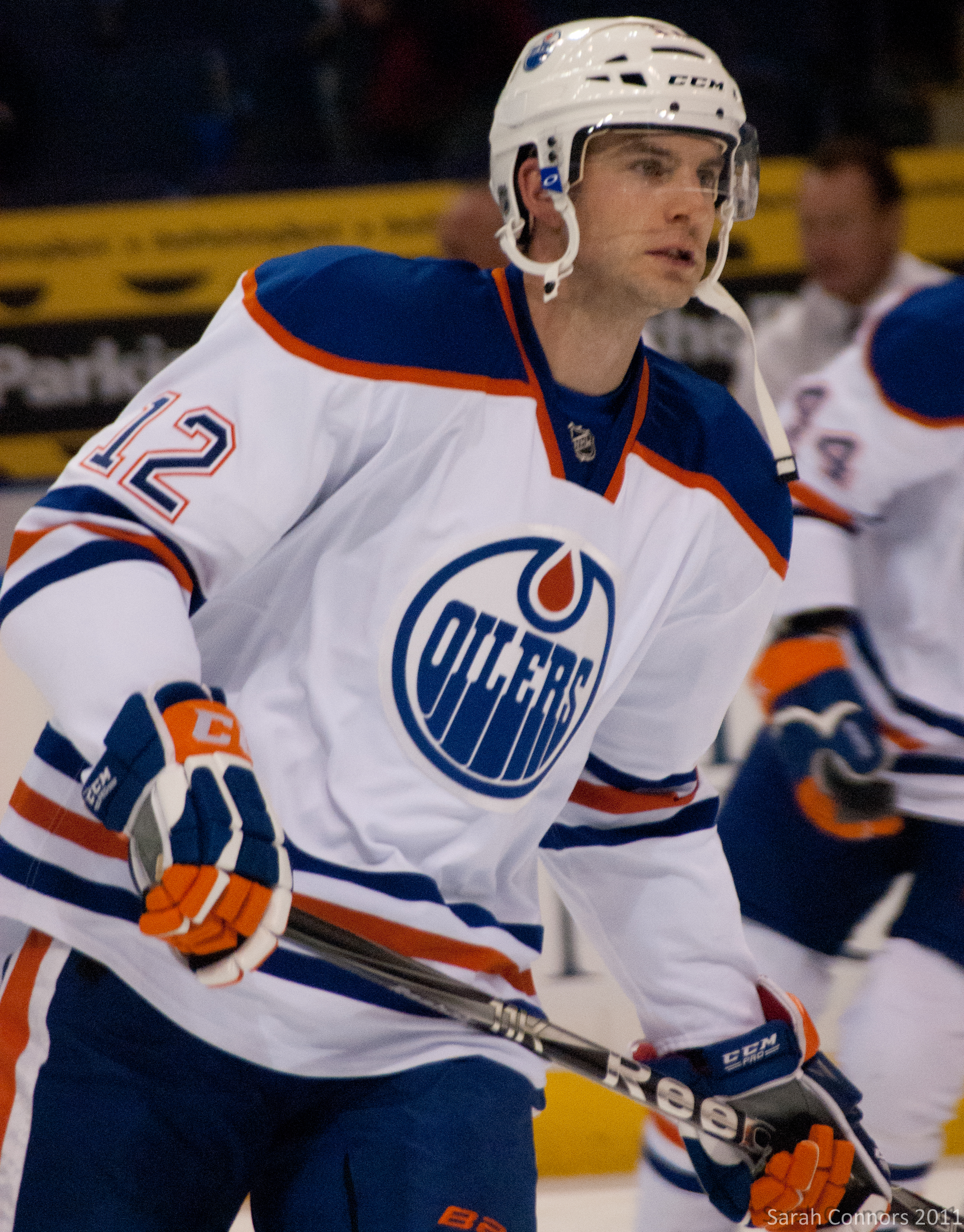
- Josh Green with the Edmonton Oilers, 2012
- Born: November 16, 1977 (age 48) Camrose, Alberta, Canada
- Height: 6 ft 3 in (191 cm)
- Weight: 218 lb (99 kg; 15 st 8 lb)
- Position: Centre
- Shot: Left
- Played for: Los Angeles Kings; New York Islanders; New York Rangers; Washington Capitals; Calgary Flames; Vancouver Canucks; EC Red Bull Salzburg; Anaheim Ducks; Edmonton Oilers; Tappara; KooKoo (ice hockey club)
- NHL draft: 30th overall, 1996; Los Angeles Kings
- Playing career: 1997–2017

Joshua Green (born November 16, 1977) is a Canadian former professional ice hockey center who played most notably in the National Hockey League (NHL).

== Playing career ==
Green was originally drafted by the Los Angeles Kings in the second round as the 30th overall pick in 1996. Green was selected from the Western Hockey League, where he was a standout for the Medicine Hat Tigers, Swift Current Broncos and the Portland Winter Hawks.

Green left the WHL during the 1997–98 season, and made his professional debut with the Fredericton Canadiens of the American Hockey League. He then made his NHL debut the following 1998–99 season with the Kings before finishing the year with their affiliate, the Springfield Falcons.

At the 1999 NHL entry draft, the Kings traded Green to the New York Islanders along with Olli Jokinen, Mathieu Biron, and a first round selection in 1999 for Žigmund Pálffy, Bryan Smolinski, Marcel Cousineau and a fourth round selection in 1999.

Green started the 1999–2000 season with the Lowell Lock Monsters before he was called up to the Islanders, scoring 12 goals in 49 games. Josh was then traded by the Islanders, for the second consecutive year at the Draft, along with Eric Brewer and a second-round selection in the 2000 entry draft to the Edmonton Oilers for Roman Hamrlík.

The 2000–01 season was almost entirely wiped out for Green when he suffered a dislocated shoulder in his second game with Oilers affiliate, the Hamilton Bulldogs. Green recovered to play in 3 playoff games with the Oilers. In the 2001–02 season, Green played his first full season in the NHL, appearing in a career-high 61 games.

In his third season with the Oilers in 2002-03, Green was traded by the Oilers to the New York Rangers for a conditional pick in 2004 on December 12, 2002. After playing in just 4 games with the Rangers, Green was claimed off waivers by the Washington Capitals on January 15, 2003.

On July 17, 2003, Green signed a one-year contract with the Calgary Flames. Green played in 36 games the 2003-04 season with the Flames before he was claimed off of waivers by the New York Rangers on March 6, 2004.

During the NHL lock-out, Green was signed to an AHL contract with the Vancouver Canucks affiliate, the Manitoba Moose. Helping guide the Moose to a successful season, Green was signed by the Canucks to a one-year contract on August 23, 2005. He was primarily used as an injury reserve forward for the Canucks in the 2005–06 season. Proving himself as a solid role player for the Canucks, Green was re-signed to a one-year extension where he appeared in 57 games in the 2006–07 season.

After spending the 2007–08 season in Austria with EC Red Bull Salzburg, Green returned to the NHL, signing a one-year deal with the Anaheim Ducks on July 22, 2008. In the 2008–09 season, Green was assigned to the Ducks affiliate, the Iowa Chops, to provide a veteran and scoring presence. Injury limited Green to only 39 games with the Chops. In posting 24 points with the Chops, Green was called up for the Ducks' playoff run and appeared in 5 postseason games.

On July 9, 2009, Green signed a one-year contract with MODO Hockey of the Swedish Elitserien. After scoring 12 goals in 47 games in a checking role with Modo for the 2009–10 season, Green returned to the Anaheim Ducks organization signing a one-year contract on July 12, 2010.

On July 3, 2011, Green signed a one-year, two-way contract with the Edmonton Oilers. He was placed on waivers on October 2, 2011, for the purpose of being assigned to the Oklahoma City Barons. Green signed a one-year minor league deal with the Oklahoma City Barons of the American Hockey League.

Green played his last four seasons in the Finnish Liiga with Tappara and KooKoo, before announcing his retirement from professional hockey on May 15, 2017.

== Career statistics ==
			Regular season					Playoffs
Season	Team	League	GP	G	A	Pts	PIM	GP	G	A	Pts	PIM
1993–94	Medicine Hat Tigers	WHL	63	22	22	44	43	3	0	0	0	4
1994–95	Medicine Hat Tigers	WHL	68	32	23	55	64	5	5	1	6	2
1995–96	Medicine Hat Tigers	WHL	46	18	25	43	55	5	2	2	4	4
1996–97	Medicine Hat Tigers	WHL	51	25	32	57	61	—	—	—	—	—
1996–97	Swift Current Broncos	WHL	23	10	15	25	33	10	9	7	16	19
1997–98	Swift Current Broncos	WHL	5	9	1	10	9	—	—	—	—	—
1997–98	Portland Winter Hawks	WHL	26	26	18	44	27	—	—	—	—	—
1997–98	Fredericton Canadiens	AHL	43	16	15	31	14	4	1	3	4	6
1998–99	Los Angeles Kings	NHL	27	1	3	4	8	—	—	—	—	—
1998–99	Springfield Falcons	AHL	41	15	15	30	29	—	—	—	—	—
1999–00	Lowell Lock Monsters	AHL	17	6	2	8	19	—	—	—	—	—
1999–00	New York Islanders	NHL	49	12	14	26	41	—	—	—	—	—
2000–01	Hamilton Bulldogs	AHL	2	2	0	2	2	—	—	—	—	—
2000–01	Edmonton Oilers	NHL	—	—	—	—	—	3	0	0	0	0
2001–02	Edmonton Oilers	NHL	61	10	5	15	52	—	—	—	—	—
2002–03	Edmonton Oilers	NHL	20	0	2	2	12	—	—	—	—	—
2002–03	New York Rangers	NHL	4	0	0	0	2	—	—	—	—	—
2002–03	Washington Capitals	NHL	21	1	2	3	7	—	—	—	—	—
2003–04	Lowell Lock Monsters	AHL	22	6	9	15	46	—	—	—	—	—
2003–04	Calgary Flames	NHL	36	2	4	6	24	—	—	—	—	—
2003–04	New York Rangers	NHL	14	3	2	5	8	—	—	—	—	—
2004–05	Manitoba Moose	AHL	67	21	19	40	72	14	9	5	14	26
2005–06	Manitoba Moose	AHL	35	7	24	31	33	10	5	5	10	23
2005–06	Vancouver Canucks	NHL	33	4	2	6	14	—	—	—	—	—
2006–07	Vancouver Canucks	NHL	57	2	5	7	25	9	0	1	1	12
2007–08	EC Red Bull Salzburg	EBEL	43	20	22	42	100	15	7	8	15	34
2008–09	Iowa Chops	AHL	39	10	14	24	52	—	—	—	—	—
2008–09	Anaheim Ducks	NHL	—	—	—	—	—	5	0	0	0	0
2009–10	Modo Hockey	SEL	47	12	8	20	79	—	—	—	—	—
2010–11	Syracuse Crunch	AHL	69	15	31	46	74	—	—	—	—	—
2010–11	Anaheim Ducks	NHL	12	0	0	0	6	—	—	—	—	—
2011–12	Oklahoma City Barons	AHL	51	16	21	37	39	9	4	2	6	4
2011–12	Edmonton Oilers	NHL	7	1	1	2	7	—	—	—	—	—
2012–13	Oklahoma City Barons	AHL	49	9	15	24	25	17	4	8	12	6
2013–14	Tappara	Liiga	44	21	10	31	94	20	5	6	11	34
2014–15	Tappara	Liiga	48	9	15	24	97	20	6	4	10	53
2015–16	KooKoo	Liiga	58	19	24	43	36	—	—	—	—	—
2016–17	KooKoo	Liiga	38	11	6	17	12	—	—	—	—	—
NHL totals			341	36	40	76	206	17	0	1	1	12
