= Syracuse Crunch =

American Hockey League team in Syracuse, New York

- City: Syracuse, New York
- League: American Hockey League
- Conference: Eastern
- Division: North
- Founded: 1992
- Home arena: Upstate Medical University Arena (Capacity: 5,800)
- Colors: Blue, white, silver, black
- Owners: Howard Dolgon
- General manager: Joel Bouchard
- Head coach: Joel Bouchard
- Captain: Steven Santini
- Media: Syracuse Post-Standard; ESPN Radio 97.7 & 100.1; AHL.TV (Internet); CW 6 (Televised home games)
- Affiliates: Tampa Bay Lightning (NHL); Orlando Solar Bears (ECHL)

Franchise history
- 1992–1994: Hamilton Canucks
- 1994–present: Syracuse Crunch

Championships
- Division titles: 4 (2001–02, 2012–13, 2016–17, 2018–19)
- Conference titles: 2 (2012–13, 2016–17)

The Syracuse Crunch are a professional ice hockey team based in Syracuse, New York. They are the American Hockey League (AHL) affiliate of the National Hockey League's Tampa Bay Lightning. They play their home games at the Upstate Medical University Arena.

== History ==
=== Vancouver and Pittsburgh affiliations (1994–2000) ===
The franchise originated in 1992 as the Hamilton Canucks, which was an affiliate of the NHL's Vancouver Canucks. The Canucks played in Hamilton, Ontario, for two seasons, before relocating to upstate New York in 1994. They were then renamed the "Crunch" from a public vote that included five names. The Crunch played their first game in Syracuse on September 30, 1994, against the Albany River Rats to a 7–7 tie with Lonny Bohonos scoring the first Crunch goal. The Crunch recorded their first win in Syracuse on October 2, 1994, as they defeated the Hershey Bears 4–1. The Crunch finished their first season 29–42–9–0, fifth place in the division, and outside the playoffs. The Crunch made the playoffs in the following season after finishing 31–37–5–7 and made it to the 1996 conference finals before losing to the eventual Calder Cup champion Rochester Americans. The team led the league in sellouts in 1996–97 and 1997–98 seasons. In 1997, the Crunch added a second NHL affiliate with the Pittsburgh Penguins.

The 1998–99 season was the Crunch's worst season in franchise history. The Crunch would finish the season with a league-worst record of 18–50–9–3. On November 25, 1998, the Crunch suffered their worst loss in team history to the Providence Bruins, with a 14–2 final score. They allowed an AHL record of 10 goals in the first period. Goalie Craig Hillier allowed seven goals before being pulled for Mike Valley, who also allowed seven. The Penguins' affiliation ended after this season when they launched the Wilkes-Barre/Scranton Penguins.

On October 30, 1999, while playing against Rochester, goaltender Christian Bronsard scored the first and only Crunch goalie goal. Bronsard became the fourth goaltender in AHL history to score a goal.

The Crunch qualified for the playoffs following the 1999–2000 season, their last season as Vancouver's AHL affiliate, but lost in the first round to the Hamilton Bulldogs.

=== Columbus affiliation (2000–2010) ===
The Crunch became the affiliate of the newly formed Columbus Blue Jackets following the 1999–2000 season. They made the playoffs in their first season under the Jackets, but lost in five games to the Wilkes-Barre/Scranton Penguins in the first round. In the following 2001–02 season, the Crunch won their first division title in franchise history behind goaltender Jean-Francois Labbe. In addition to the division title, they also were regular season Western Conference champions, with a conference-leading 96 points. However, they were two points shy of tying the Bridgeport Sound Tigers for the AHL lead, and three points shy of winning the Macgregor Kilpatrick Trophy for top team in the regular season. After receiving a bye in the Conference Qualifiers round, the Crunch swept the Philadelphia Phantoms in three games, but lost to the eventual Calder Cup champion Chicago Wolves in the next round in seven games.

On March 17, 2002, the Crunch played against the Wilkes-Barre/Scranton Penguins. This game was nicknamed the "St. Patrick's Day Massacre". The Crunch accumulated 124 penalty minutes, 80 of which were fighting-related, while the Penguins had 162 penalty minutes with 102 for fighting. The Crunch won the game 4–0. The Crunch would miss the playoffs the following season, their second-worst season in franchise history, finishing 27–41–8–4.

In the 2004 Calder Cup playoffs, the Crunch became the twelfth team to blow a 3–1 series lead when they lost to the Rochester Americans in the first round. The Crunch were on home ice for game seven and forward Kent McDonnell missed an empty net when the Americans' goalie Ryan Miller was caught out of position. Rochester then recovered with an odd-man rush and Norm Milley beat Crunch goalie Karl Goehring to win the game in overtime.

The 2005–06 season was the best season the Crunch had during the 80-game schedule format. They scored a team record of 272 goals, but they also allowed 251 goals, and ended the regular season second in their division, 13 points behind Grand Rapids. They also had 47 wins, which is tied with their 2018–19 season record, albeit in four fewer games with the 76-game schedule. Andy Delmore won the Eddie Shore Award, scoring 72 points in 66 games, while also making the AHL First All-Star team at the end of the season. Mark Hartigan also scored 75 points in 49 games, averaging over a point and a half per game. They then lost in the first round of the 2006 Calder Cup playoffs to the Manitoba Moose in six games.

During the 2007–08 season, the Crunch went on a 15-game winning streak at the end of the season from March 8 to April 13, 2008, to make the playoffs. The Crunch also went without losing a game in regulation for the final 23 games of the season, spanning from February 22 to April 13, 2008. They defeated the Manitoba Moose in six games, where five of them went to overtime. They advanced to the second round to face the Toronto Marlies, but blew another 3–1 series lead.

The Crunch played the first outdoor game in AHL history on February 20, 2010, against the Binghamton Senators. The Mirabito Outdoor Classic took place at the Grandstand at the New York State Fairgrounds in Syracuse. The game set a then AHL attendance record of 21,508. Syracuse won the game 2–1, with goals scored by Alexandre Picard and David Liffiton. Goaltender Kevin Lalande made 36 saves en route to the Syracuse victory.

The Crunch missed the playoffs in their final two seasons as the affiliate of the Blue Jackets, as they switched their affiliation to the Springfield Falcons in 2010.

=== Anaheim affiliation (2010–2012) ===
The Anaheim affiliation lasted two seasons, resulting in one playoff appearance in the 2011–12 season. They lost in the first round to the St. John's IceCaps in four games. The affiliation produced future NHL players such as Kyle Palmieri, Nick Bonino and Patrick Maroon.

=== Early affiliation success and first finals appearance (2012–2015) ===
The Crunch signed a multi-year affiliation deal with the Tampa Bay Lightning beginning with the 2012–13 season. Due to the 2012–13 NHL lockout, the Crunch were able to initially roster many future NHLers before the start of the NHL season, such as Tyler Johnson, Alex Killorn, Radko Gudas, and Ondrej Palat. Head coach Jon Cooper was the first head coach during the Tampa Bay affiliation, but was promoted mid-season following the firing of Lightning head coach Guy Boucher. Rob Zettler was named as head coach, a role he would hold until the end of the 2015–16 season. This helped the affiliation to bring in immediate success, resulting in the team's first division championship in 11 years. The offense surged, scoring a league-leading 247 goals. At the end of the season, Tyler Johnson won the Les Cunningham Award, Willie Marshall Award, and the President's Award. He was the first MVP in Crunch history. He totaled 65 points, scoring 37 goals and assisted on 28 goals.

The team won seven consecutive games to open the playoffs, including two consecutive round sweeps of the Portland Pirates in the conference quarterfinals, and another sweep of the Springfield Falcons in the conference semifinals, before losing the opening game of the eastern conference finals to the Wilkes-Barre/Scranton Penguins. The Crunch were able to win the following four games, advancing to the 2013 Calder Cup finals, their first ever Calder Cup appearance. The Crunch faced off against the Grand Rapids Griffins, but lost to the Griffins in six games.

The Crunch could not replicate the success of the previous season, finishing last place in the division, while missing the 2014 Calder Cup playoffs entirely. The Crunch were able to initially roster future NHLers, such as Nikita Kucherov, Brett Connolly, and Vladislav Namestnikov. The team also added Yanni Gourde and Jonathan Marchessault as late season additions.

On November 22, 2014, the Syracuse Crunch set a new United States indoor professional hockey attendance record with 30,715 fans at the Carrier Dome for the "Toyota Frozen Dome Classic". Syracuse defeated the Utica Comets 2–1.

=== Ben Groulx era and second finals appearance (2016–2023) ===
The Crunch won their second division title under the Tampa affiliation in the 2016–17 season. They advanced to their second Calder Cup appearance, again against the Grand Rapids Griffins. The Griffins took the series in six games and won the series 4–2. They also lost an AHL record eight road games during the playoffs.

On May 5, 2018, the Syracuse Crunch played their longest game in team history, which the Crunch lost 2–1 in double overtime to the Toronto Marlies. The game lasted 95 minutes and 10 seconds. The Crunch previously played two double-overtime games, both in the 2017 Calder Cup playoffs. They played a double-overtime game in the first round against the St. John's IceCaps, resulting in a 4–3 double-overtime win. That game lasted 90 minutes and 37 seconds, their previous record. They also played another double-overtime game in the 2017 Calder Cup Finals, a 6–5 loss in double overtime to the Grand Rapids Griffins, lasting 87 minutes and 2 seconds.

The 2018–19 season was the best season the Crunch has had during the 76-game schedule format. The Crunch tied a team record in points with 102, and tied a franchise record in wins with 47. Edward Pasquale won the Harry "Hap" Holmes Memorial Award, Carter Verhaeghe won the John B. Sollenberger Trophy and Verhaeghe and Alex Barre-Boulet both won the Willie Marshall Award, as they both tied for the league lead in goals scored. The Crunch also achieved 900 franchise victories with a 6–2 win over the Utica Comets on March 30, 2019. The Crunch won their third division title in the Tampa affiliation, but were upset in four games by the Cleveland Monsters.

The Crunch played their first 62 games of the 2019–20 season, but the season was suspended on March 12, 2020, due to the COVID-19 pandemic. The season was ultimately cancelled on May 11, 2020. The start of the following season was also pushed back to February 5, 2021. The Crunch also gained a temporary second NHL affiliation in the Florida Panthers as their AHL affiliate, the Charlotte Checkers, opted out of participating in the abbreviated season.

Prior to the pandemic-related schedule changes, the Crunch were to face the Utica Comets in an outdoor game hosted by Utica at the Griffiss Business and Technology Park in Rome, New York, on February 13, 2021, however, the game did not take place as scheduled.

=== Syracuse Hockey Hall of Fame ===
On November 5, 2024, the Crunch announced the creation of the Syracuse Hockey Hall of Fame. The inaugural class included Crunch owner Howard Dolgon, longtime Onondaga County Deputy County Executive Ed Kochian, Crunch general partner Alan Taylor, Syracuse Blazers forward Brian Elwell, and former Crunch forward Scott Walker. The inaugural class was inducted on November 23, 2024.

The second class of the Syracuse Hockey Hall of Fame featured three Crunch captains; Zenon Konopka, who played from the Crunch from 2007 to 2008, and signed a one-day contract on April 1, 2017 to retire as a member of the team; Mike Angelidis, who played for the Crunch from 2012 to 2016 and served as the captain for his entire tenure; and Gabriel Dumont, who played for the Crunch in from 2016 to 2019, and once again from 2021 to 2025, whilst serving as captain of the Crunch for the 2018–19 season, and the entirety of his second stint with the team. The class also featured George McPhee, who served as the team's general manager from 1994 to 1997. The second class was inducted on February 28, 2026.

=== Syracuse hockey history ===
American Hockey League teams that played in Syracuse:

- Syracuse Stars (1930–1936) in the Original IHL
- Syracuse Stars (1936–1940) in the IAHL – The first team to win the Calder Cup in (1936–37)
- Syracuse Warriors (1951–1954)
- Syracuse Eagles (1974–75)
- Syracuse Firebirds (1979–80)

Other hockey teams that played in Syracuse:

- Syracuse Braves (1962–1963) (EPHL)
- Syracuse Blazers (1967–1973) (EHL)
- Syracuse Blazers (1973–1977) (NAHL)
- Syracuse Condors (Granted a franchise by the NAHL for 1977–78 season, but the league folded and the team never played a game)
- Syracuse Hornets (1980–1981) (EHL) – played only ten games (0-9-1)
- Syracuse Jr. Crunch/Syracuse Stars (1996–2005) in the Metro Junior A Hockey League and Ontario Provincial Junior A Hockey League

== Logos ==
Owner Howard Dolgon came up with the superhero mascot Crunchman for the team's debut in 1994. In 2000, as the Crunch became an affiliate of the Columbus Blue Jackets, Crunchman was replaced with Al the Ice Gorilla. Al remained until 2012, when Dolgon found the new affiliation with Tampa Bay a good reason to return with Crunchman.

Original Crunch logo
1994–2000

Second Crunch logo
2000–2010

Third Crunch logo
2010–2012

Current Crunch logo
2012–present

== Season-by-season results ==
Regular season												Playoffs					
Season	Games	Won	Lost	Tied	OTL	SOL	Points	PCT	Goals for	Goals against	Standing (Division)	Year	Prelims	1st Round	Quarterfinals	Semifinals	Finals
1994–95	80	29	42	9	0	—	67	.419	288	325	5th, South	1995	—	Did not qualify			
1995–96	80	31	37	5	7	—	74	.463	257	307	5th, Central	1996	—	W, 3–1, BNG	W, 4–3, BAL	L, 1–4, ROC	—
1996–97	80	32	38	10	0	—	74	.463	241	265	4th, Empire State	1997	—	L, 0–3, ROC	—	—	—
1997–98	80	35	32	11	2	—	83	.519	272	285	3rd, Empire State	1998	—	L, 2–3, HAM	—	—	—
1998–99	80	18	50	9	3	—	48	.300	220	327	5th, Empire State	1999	—	Did not qualify			
1999–00	80	35	35	9	1	—	80	.500	290	294	2nd, Empire State	2000	—	L, 1–3, HAM	—	—	—
2000–01	80	33	30	12	5	—	83	.519	235	254	3rd, Mid-Atlantic	2001	—	L, 2–3, WBS	—	—	—
2001–02	80	39	23	13	5	—	96	.600	228	193	1st, Central	2002	BYE	W, 3–0, PHI	L, 3–4, CHI	—	—
2002–03	80	27	41	8	4	—	66	.413	201	256	4th, Central	2003	Did not qualify				
2003–04	80	38	25	10	7	—	93	.581	239	235	2nd, North	2004	BYE	L, 3–4, ROC	—	—	—
2004–05	80	36	33	—	4	7	83	.519	215	230	5th, North	2005	—	Did not qualify			
2005–06	80	47	25	—	5	3	102	.638	272	251	2nd, North	2006	—	L, 2–4, MTB	—	—	—
2006–07	80	34	34	—	4	8	80	.500	250	248	5th, North	2007	—	Did not qualify			
2007–08	80	46	26	—	2	6	100	.625	247	201	2nd, North	2008	—	W, 4–2, MTB	L, 3–4, TOR	—	—
2008–09	80	40	32	—	5	3	88	.550	214	226	5th, North	2009	—	Did not qualify			
2009–10	80	34	39	—	4	3	75	.469	227	272	6th, East	2010	—	Did not qualify			
2010–11	80	35	38	—	3	4	77	.481	221	250	6th, East	2011	—	Did not qualify			
2011–12	76	37	29	—	5	5	84	.553	238	229	4th, East	2012	—	L, 1–3, STJ	—	—	—
2012–13	76	43	22	—	6	5	97	.638	247	201	1st, East	2013	—	W, 3–0, POR	W, 4–0, SPR	W, 4–1, WBS	L, 2–4, GR
2013–14	76	31	32	—	4	9	75	.493	198	232	5th, East	2014	—	Did not qualify			
2014–15	76	41	25	—	10	0	92	.605	218	219	2nd, Northeast	2015	—	L, 0–3, WBS	—	—	—
2015–16	76	32	29	—	11	4	79	.520	213	240	6th, North	2016	—	Did not qualify			
2016–17	76	38	24	—	7	7	90	.592	232	227	1st, North	2017	—	W, 3–1, STJ	W, 4–3, TOR	W, 4–1, PRO	L, 2–4, GR
2017–18	76	46	22	—	3	5	100	.658	236	193	2nd, North	2018	—	W, 3–0, ROC	L, 0–4, TOR	—	—
2018–19	76	47	21	—	4	4	102	.671	264	187	1st, North	2019	—	L, 1–3, CLE	—	—	—
2019–20	62	30	23	—	4	5	69	.556	202	210	5th, North	2020	—	Season cancelled due to the COVID-19 pandemic			
2020–21	32	19	10	—	3	0	41	.641	120	93	3rd, North	2021	—	No playoffs were held			
2021–22	76	41	26	—	7	2	91	.599	242	229	2nd, North	2022	BYE	L, 2–3, LAV	—	—	—
2022–23	72	35	26	—	7	4	81	.563	252	239	2nd, North	2023	BYE	L, 2–3, ROC	—	—	—
2023–24	72	39	24	—	4	5	87	.604	220	203	3rd, North	2024	BYE	W, 3–2, ROC	L, 0–3, CLE	—	—
2024–25	72	37	23	—	8	4	86	.597	206	187	3rd, North	2025	BYE	L, 0–3, ROC	—	—	—
2025–26	72	41	24	—	3	4	89	.618	237	189	2nd, North	2026	BYE	L, 1–3, CLE	—	—	—

== Players and coaches ==
=== Current roster ===
Updated November 5, 2026.

No.	Nat	Player	Pos	S/G	Age	Acquired	Birthplace	Contract
80	(United States)	Nick Abruzzese	LW	L	27	2025	Slate Hill, New York	Lightning
14	(Canada)	Tristan Allard	C	L	24	2023	Renfrew, Ontario	Lightning
19	(Canada)	Clark Bishop (A)	LW	L	30	2026	St. John's, Newfoundland	Crunch
23	(United States)	Michael Callahan	D	R	27	2026	Franklin, Massachusetts	Lightning
73	(Canada)	Elliot Desnoyers	LW	L	24	2026	Saint-Hyacinthe, Quebec	Crunch
25	(United States)	Dylan Duke (A)	C	L	23	2024	Strongsville, Ohio	Lightning
61	(Canada)	Shawn Element	LW	L	26	2026	Victoriaville, Quebec	Crunch
20	(United States)	Cooper Flinton	LW	L	23	2025	Auburn, New Hampshire	Lightning
13	(United States)	Brendan Furry	LW	L	28	2025	Toledo, Ohio	Crunch
79	(Canada)	Ethan Gauthier	RW	R	24	2025	Phoenix, Arizona	Lightning
57	(Canada)	Dyllan Gill	D	R	22	2024	Riverview, New Brunswick	Lightning
52	(Russia)	Maxim Groshev	D	L	24	2023	Agryz, Russia	Lightning
26	(Canada)	Jansen Harkins	C	L	29	2026	Cleveland, Ohio	Lightning
17	(United States)	Dominic James	LW	L	23	2025	Plymouth, Michigan	Lightning
82	(Slovakia)	Tomas Kralovic	D	R	21	2026	Bratislava, Slovakia	Lightning
7	(Sweden)	Simon Lundmark	D	R	26	2025	Stockholm, Sweden	Lightning
11	(Canada)	Lucas Mercuri	C	R	24	2025	Montreal, Quebec	Lightning
8	(United States)	Tommy Miller	D	R	27	2025	West Bloomfield, Michigan	Crunch
22	(Canada)	Jakob Pelletier (A)	LW	L	25	2025	Quebec City, Quebec	Lightning
75	(United States)	Matteo Pietroniro	D	L	28	2025	Boise, Idaho	Crunch
29	(Canada)	Sam O'Reilly	C	R	20	2026	Toronto, Ontario	Lightning
33	(Canada)	Olivier Rodrigue	G	L	26	2026	Chicoutimi, Quebec	Lightning
16	(United States)	Steven Santini (C)	D	R	31	2024	Mahopac, New York	Lightning
30	(Denmark)	Mads Sogaard	G	L	25	2026	Aalborg, Denmark	Lightning
44	(Norway)	Noah Steen	LW	L	22	2026	Oslo, Norway	Lightning
95	(Czech Republic)	Gabriel Szturc	C	L	23	2024	Český Těšín, Czech Republic	Lightning
28	(United States)	Jarred Tinordi (A)	D	L	34	2025	Burnsville, Minnesota	Crunch

=== Team captains ===
- Dane Jackson, 1994–1995
- Mark Wotton, 1995–1999
- Brian Bonin, 1999–2000
- Mike Gaul, 2000–2001
- Sean Pronger, 2001–2002
- David Ling, 2002–2003
- Darrel Scoville, 2003–2004
- Jamie Pushor, 2004–2007
- Zenon Konopka, 2007–2008
- Dan Smith, 2008–2009
- Derek MacKenzie, 2009–2010
- Joe DiPenta, 2010–2011
- Nate Guenin, 2011–2012
- Mike Angelidis, 2012–2016
- Luke Witkowski, 2016–2017, 2019–2021
- Erik Condra, 2017–2018
- Gabriel Dumont, 2018–2019, 2021–2025
- Steven Santini, 2025–present

=== Head coaches ===
- Jack McIlhargey: 1994–1999
- Stan Smyl: 1999–2000
- Gary Agnew: 2000–2006
- Ross Yates: 2006–2010
- Mark Holick: 2010–2012
- Trent Yawney: 2012
- Jon Cooper: 2012–2013
- Rob Zettler: 2013–2016
- Benoit Groulx: 2016–2023
- Joel Bouchard: 2023–present

=== Current coaching staff ===
- Joel Bouchard — Head coach
- J. D. Forrest — Assistant coach
- Sylvain Favreau — Assistant coach
- Maxime Vaillancourt — Goaltending coach
- Jacob Wheeler — Video coach

=== American Hockey League Hall of Famers ===
AHL Hall of Fame Honored Members
Name	Seasons	Induction Year
Frederic Cassivi	1996–97 (player)	2015
Jean-Francois Labbe	2000–03 (player)	2016
Michael Leighton	2017–18 (player)	2025

=== Honored numbers ===
The Crunch raised a banner following a fan vote during the team's fifth season in honor of fan favorite #14 "Big Bad" John Badduke. It is not retired, as it would later be worn by former United States Olympian Darby Hendrickson, Serge Aubin, Richard Panik, Justin Courtnall, Brandon Alderson, Mike McNamee, Kevin Lynch, Devante Stephens and most recently, Brandon Crawley.

During the 2008–09 season, the team temporarily reserved, but not retired, #7 as a tribute to Paul Newman after his death. This honors Reg Dunlop, the player-coach for the fictional Charlestown Chiefs, which Newman played in the movie Slap Shot. The movie was filmed partially at Onondaga County War Memorial. Coincidentally, other scenes were filmed at Cambria County War Memorial Arena in Johnstown, Pennsylvania, the home ice of the Crunch's former ECHL affiliate, the Johnstown Chiefs. The banner was raised October 14 and was up for the entire season, but the number was not retired, as it was most recently worn by Crunch player Mathieu Joseph in the 2019–20 season.

On March 26, 2016, the Syracuse Crunch retired Dolph Schayes' number #4. Schayes played for the Syracuse Nationals and their successor, the Philadelphia 76ers. He was the first player in the National Basketball Association to score 15,000 points in his career. This number is not officially retired, as the number was most recently worn by Trevor Carrick during the 2022–23 season.

=== Notable Crunch alumni ===
- Mike Angelidis
- Adrian Aucoin
- Mark Barberio
- Francois Beauchemin
- Matt Beleskey
- Lonny Bohonos
- Nick Bonino
- Derick Brassard
- J. T. Brown
- Anthony Cirelli
- Grant Clitsome
- Ross Colton
- Cory Conacher
- Brett Connolly
- Erik Condra
- Ty Conklin
- Tony DeAngelo
- Derek Dorsett
- Jonathan Drouin
- Ray Emery
- Jason Garrison
- Yanni Gourde
- Radko Gudas
- Tim Jackman
- Tyler Johnson
- Mathieu Joseph
- Alex Killorn
- Slater Koekkoek
- Nikita Kucherov
- Jean-Francois Labbe
- Pascal Leclaire
- Anders Lindback
- Jonathan Marchessault
- Patrick Maroon
- Vladislav Namestnikov
- Riley Nash
- Ondrej Palat
- Kyle Palmieri
- Richard Panik
- Cedric Paquette
- Michael Peca
- Brayden Point
- Dave Scatchard
- Brent Sopel
- Andrej Sustr
- Dustin Tokarski
- Andrei Vasilevskiy
- Carter Verhaeghe
- Scott Walker
- Luke Witkowski

== Franchise records and leaders ==
Records as of the end of the 2025–26 AHL regular season

=== Single season records ===
Goals: Lonny Bohonos, 40 (1995–96)
Assists: Alex Barre-Boulet, 60 (2022–23)
Points: Alex Barre-Boulet, 84 (2022–23)
Penalty minutes: Jody Shelley, 357 (2000–01)
Wins: Corey Hirsch, 30 (1997–98)
GAA: Jean-Francois Labbe, 2.18 (2001–02)
SV%: Jean-Francois Labbe, .928 (2001–02)

=== Single playoff records ===
Minimum 10 Calder Cup playoff games played

Goals: Lonny Bohonos, 14 (1996)
Assists: Ondrej Palat, 19 (2013)
Points: Cory Conacher, 28 (2017)
Penalty minutes: Richard Panik, 59 (2013)
Wins: Cedrick Desjardins (2013) and Mike McKenna (2017), 13
GAA: Jean-Francois Labbe, 1.91 (2002)
SV%: Jean-Francois Labbe, .939 (2002)

=== Career records ===
Career games: Daniel Walcott, 433
Career goals: Alex Barre-Boulet, 113
Career assists: Alex Barre-Boulet, 189
Career points: Alex Barre-Boulet, 302
Career penalty minutes: Jeremy Reich, 820
Career goaltending wins: Karl Goehring, 78
Career shutouts: Brandon Halverson, 12

== Trophies and awards ==
=== Award winners ===
Dudley "Red" Garrett Memorial Award

- Alex Barre-Boulet (2018–19)

Eddie Shore Award

- Andy Delmore (2005–06)
- Matt Taormina (2016–17)

Harry "Hap" Holmes Memorial Award

- Edward Pasquale (2018–19)
- Brandon Halverson and Matt Tomkins (2024–25)

James C. Hendy Memorial Award

- Vance Lederman (2014–15)

James H. Ellery Memorial Awards

- Adam Benigni (1994–95)
- Seth Everett (1995–96)
- Lindsay Kramer (1996–97)

John B. Sollenberger Trophy

- Carter Verhaeghe (2018–19)
- Jakob Pelletier (2025–26)

Ken McKenzie Award

- Tim Kuhl (1994–95, 1995–96)
- Jim Sarosy (2001–02, 2009–10)

Les Cunningham Award

- Tyler Johnson (2012–13)

Thomas Ebright Memorial Award

- Howard Dolgon (2013–14)

Willie Marshall Award

- Tyler Johnson (2012–13)
- Carter Verhaeghe, Alex Barre-Boulet (2018–19)

Yanick Dupre Memorial Award

- Eric Neilson (2013–14)
- Brad Chavis (2020–21)
- Daniel Walcott (2023–24)
