= 1996 Calder Cup playoffs =

North American ice hockey tournament

Tournament details
- Dates: April 19 – June 13, 1996
- Teams: 16

Final positions
- Champions: Rochester Americans
- Runners-up: Portland Pirates

The 1996 Calder Cup playoffs of the American Hockey League began on April 19, 1996. The sixteen teams that qualified, eight from each conference, played best-of-five series for division semifinals and best-of-seven series for division finals and conference finals. The conference champions played a best-of-seven series for the Calder Cup. The Calder Cup Final ended on June 13, 1996, with the Rochester Americans defeating the Portland Pirates four games to three to win the sixth Calder Cup in team history. Rochester's Dixon Ward won the Jack A. Butterfield Trophy as AHL playoff MVP.

The Saint John Flames set an AHL playoff record by winning six games in overtime. This record was equaled by the Milwaukee Admirals in 2004.

== Playoff seeds ==
After the 1995-96 AHL regular season, 16 teams qualified for the playoffs. The top four teams from each division qualified for the playoffs. However, due to the uneven number of teams in the each conference, it was possible for the fifth-placed team in the five team divisions to crossover to the playoffs for the four team divisions. This could only happen if the fifth-placed team in a five team division earned more points than the fourth-placed team in the four team division in the same conference. In this case, the fifth-placed team from the five team division would play in place of the fourth-placed team from the four team division in that part of the playoff bracket. The Albany River Rats were the Southern Conference regular season champions and also had the best overall record for the regular season. The Springfield Falcons were the Northern Conference regular season champions.

=== Northern Conference ===
==== Atlantic Division ====
1. Prince Edward Island Senators - 85 points
2. Saint John Flames - 85 points
3. St. John's Maple Leafs - 80 points
4. Fredericton Canadiens - 79 points

==== Northern Division ====
1. Springfield Falcons - Northern Conference regular season champions, 100 points
2. Worcester IceCats - 88 points
3. Portland Pirates - 78 points
4. Providence Bruins - 74 points

=== Southern Conference ===
==== Central Division ====
1. Albany River Rats - Southern Conference regular season champions; Best regular season record, 115 points
2. Adirondack Red Wings - 86 points
3. Rochester Americans - 83 points
4. Cornwall Aces - 80 points
5. Syracuse Crunch - 74 points (Played in the South Division bracket by virtue of earning more points than the fourth-placed team in that division)

==== Southern Division ====
1. Binghamton Rangers - 88 points
2. Hershey Bears - 86 points
3. Baltimore Bandits - 77 points

== Bracket ==
Division Semifinals	Division Finals
A1	P.E.I.	2
A4	Fredericton	3
A4	Fredericton	1
Atlantic Division
A2	Saint John	4
A2	Saint John	3
A3	St. John's	1
Northern Conference
N1	Springfield	3
N4	Providence	1
N1	Springfield	2
Northern Division
N3	Portland	4
N2	Worcester	1
N3	Portland	3
C1	Albany	1
C4	Cornwall	3
C4	Cornwall	0
Central Division
C3	Rochester	4
C2	Adirondack	0
C3	Rochester	3
Southern Conference
S1	Binghamton	1
C5	Syracuse	3
C5	Syracuse	4
Southern Division
S3	Baltimore	3
S2	Hershey	2
S3	Baltimore	3

Conference Finals
A2	Saint John	3
N3	Portland	4
C3	Rochester	4
C5	Syracuse	1

Calder Cup Final
N3	Portland	3
C3	Rochester	4

In each round the team that earned more points during the regular season receives home ice advantage, meaning they receive the "extra" game on home-ice if the series reaches the maximum number of games. There is no set series format due to arena scheduling conflicts and travel considerations.

== Division Semifinals ==
Note 1: All times are in Eastern Time (UTC-4).
Note 2: Game times in italics signify games to be played only if necessary.
Note 3: Home team is listed first.
Note 4: The number of overtime periods played (where applicable) is not specified

=== Northern Conference ===
==== Atlantic Division ====
===== (A1) Prince Edward Island Senators vs. (A4) Fredericton Canadiens =====
April 19	Prince Edward Island Senators	4 - 7	Fredericton Canadiens

April 20	Prince Edward Island Senators	7 - 3	Fredericton Canadiens

April 26	Fredericton Canadiens	6 - 5	OT	Prince Edward Island Senators

April 27	Fredericton Canadiens	5 - 6	OT	Prince Edward Island Senators

April 29	Prince Edward Island Senators	3 - 5	Fredericton Canadiens

Fredericton won series 3 – 2

===== (A2) Saint John Flames vs. (A3) St. John's Maple Leafs =====
April 21	Saint John Flames	2 - 3	St. John's Maple Leafs

April 23	Saint John Flames	2 - 1	OT	St. John's Maple Leafs

April 26	St. John's Maple Leafs	2 - 3	Saint John Flames

April 27	St. John's Maple Leafs	3 - 4	OT	Saint John Flames

Saint John won series 3 - 1

==== Northern Division ====
===== (N1) Springfield Falcons vs. (N4) Providence Bruins =====
April 19	Springfield Falcons	3 - 6	Providence Bruins

April 20	Springfield Falcons	3 - 2	Providence Bruins

April 26	Providence Bruins	4 - 5	OT	Springfield Falcons

April 27	Providence Bruins	3 - 4	OT	Springfield Falcons

Springfield won series 3 – 1

===== (N2) Worcester IceCats vs. (N3) Portland Pirates =====
April 19	Worcester IceCats	0 - 5	Portland Pirates

April 20	Worcester IceCats	2 - 1	Portland Pirates

April 26	Portland Pirates	6 - 5	OT	Worcester IceCats

April 27	Portland Pirates	3 - 2	Worcester IceCats

Portland won series 3 - 1

=== Southern Conference ===
==== Central Division ====
===== (C1) Albany River Rats vs. (C4) Cornwall Aces =====
April 21	Albany River Rats	5 - 0	Cornwall Aces

April 22	Albany River Rats	2 - 3	Cornwall Aces

April 24	Cornwall Aces	3 - 0	Albany River Rats

April 26	Cornwall Aces	2 - 1	OT	Albany River Rats

Cornwall won series 3 - 1

===== (C2) Adirondack Red Wings vs. (C3) Rochester Americans =====
April 19	Adirondack Red Wings	1 - 4	Rochester Americans

April 20	Adirondack Red Wings	1 - 3	Rochester Americans

April 26	Rochester Americans	6 - 0	Adirondack Red Wings

Rochester won series 3 - 0

==== Southern Division ====
===== (S1) Binghamton Rangers vs. (C5) Syracuse Crunch =====
April 19	Binghamton Rangers	8 - 5	Syracuse Crunch

April 20	Binghamton Rangers	0 - 6	Syracuse Crunch

April 26	Syracuse Crunch	4 - 3	OT	Binghamton Rangers

April 27	Syracuse Crunch	6 - 3	Binghamton Rangers

Syracuse won series 3 - 1

===== (S2) Hershey Bears vs. (S3) Baltimore Bandits =====
April 19	Hershey Bears	2 - 5	Baltimore Bandits

April 20	Baltimore Bandits	3 - 2	OT	Hershey Bears

April 24	Hershey Bears	7 - 5	Baltimore Bandits

April 26	Baltimore Bandits	2 - 4	Hershey Bears

April 28	Hershey Bears	3 - 4	OT	Baltimore Bandits

Baltimore won series 3 - 2

== Division Finals ==
=== Northern Conference ===
==== Atlantic Division ====
===== (A2) Saint John Flames vs. (A4) Fredericton Canadiens =====
May 3	Saint John Flames	5 - 0	Fredericton Canadiens

May 5	Saint John Flames	1 - 5	Fredericton Canadiens

May 8	Fredericton Canadiens	4 - 5	OT	Saint John Flames

May 10	Fredericton Canadiens	3 - 4	OT	Saint John Flames

May 12	Saint John Flames	4 - 3	Fredericton Canadiens

Saint John won series 4 - 1

==== Northern Division ====
===== (N1) Springfield Falcons vs. (N3) Portland Pirates =====
May 2	Springfield Falcons	3 - 4	Portland Pirates

May 3	Springfield Falcons	5 - 1	Portland Pirates

May 5	Portland Pirates	7 - 2	Springfield Falcons

May 8	Portland Pirates	6 - 0	Springfield Falcons

May 10	Springfield Falcons	4 - 3	Portland Pirates

May 11	Portland Pirates	6 - 4	Springfield Falcons

Portland won series 4 - 2

=== Southern Conference ===
==== Central Division ====
===== (C3) Rochester Americans vs. (C4) Cornwall Aces =====
May 1	Rochester Americans	3 - 2	Cornwall Aces

May 3	Rochester Americans	6 - 3	Cornwall Aces

May 5	Cornwall Aces	1 - 3	Rochester Americans

May 7	Cornwall Aces	2 - 3	OT	Rochester Americans

Rochester won series 4 - 0

==== Southern Division ====
===== (S3) Baltimore Bandits vs. (C5) Syracuse Crunch =====
May 1	Baltimore Bandits	4 - 3	OT	Syracuse Crunch

May 3	Baltimore Bandits	0 - 3	Syracuse Crunch

May 6	Syracuse Crunch	7 - 5	Baltimore Bandits

May 8	Syracuse Crunch	4 - 1	Baltimore Bandits

May 10	Baltimore Bandits	5 - 4	Syracuse Crunch

May 12	Syracuse Crunch	1 - 7	Baltimore Bandits

May 14	Baltimore Bandits	4 - 5	Syracuse Crunch

Syracuse won series 4 - 3

== Conference finals ==
=== Northern Conference ===
==== (A2) Saint John Flames vs. (N3) Portland Pirates ====
May 16	Saint John Flames	3 - 2	OT	Portland Pirates

May 18	Saint John Flames	1 - 7	Portland Pirates

May 21	Portland Pirates	4 - 1	Saint John Flames

May 24	Portland Pirates	1 - 4	Saint John Flames

May 25	Portland Pirates	2 - 3	OT	Saint John Flames

May 27	Saint John Flames	2 - 5	Portland Pirates

May 29	Saint John Flames	0 - 5	Portland Pirates

Portland won series 4 - 3

=== Southern Conference ===
==== (C3) Rochester Americans vs. (C5) Syracuse Crunch ====
May 17	Rochester Americans	5 - 2	Syracuse Crunch

May 19	Rochester Americans	6 - 4	Syracuse Crunch

May 22	Syracuse Crunch	4 - 2	Rochester Americans

May 24	Syracuse Crunch	1 - 4	Rochester Americans

May 25	Rochester Americans	6 - 5	OT	Syracuse Crunch

Rochester won series 4 - 1

== Calder Cup Final ==
=== (C3) Rochester Americans vs. (N3) Portland Pirates ===
June 1	Rochester Americans	5 - 3	Portland Pirates

June 2	Rochester Americans	5 - 1	Portland Pirates

June 5	Portland Pirates	3 - 2	Rochester Americans

June 8	Portland Pirates	5 - 4	Rochester Americans

June 9	Portland Pirates	4 - 5	OT	Rochester Americans

June 11	Rochester Americans	1 - 5	Portland Pirates

June 13	Rochester Americans	2 - 1	Portland Pirates

Rochester won series 4 - 3

== See also ==
- 1995–96 AHL season
- List of AHL seasons

Preceded by 1995 Calder Cup playoffs	Calder Cup playoffs 1996	Succeeded by 1997 Calder Cup playoffs
