= Allstate Arena =

Multi-purpose arena in Rosemont, Illinois, U.S.

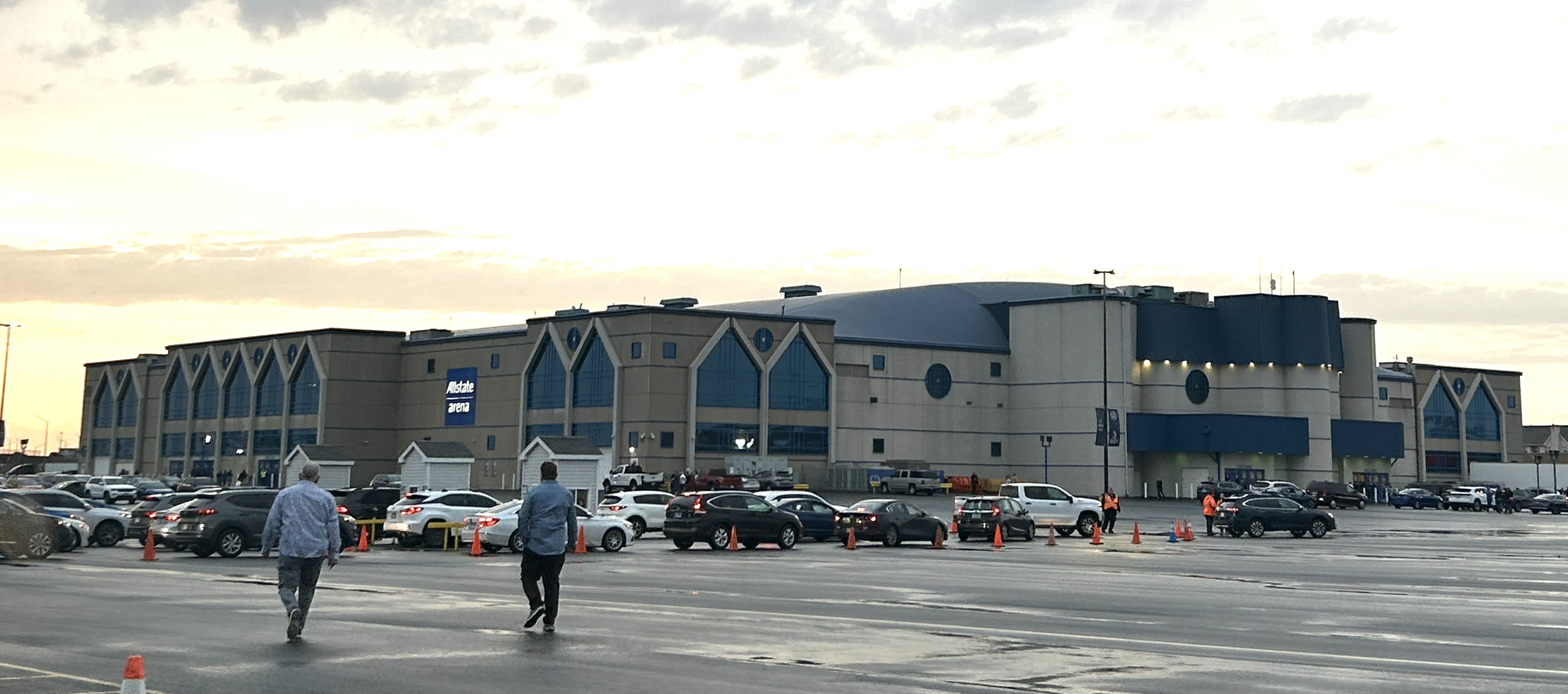
- Allstate Arena in 2025

- Location within Illinois Location within the United States
- Former names: Rosemont Horizon (1980–1999)
- Address: 6920 North Mannheim Road
- Location: Rosemont, Illinois, U.S.
- Coordinates: 42°0′19″N 87°53′16″W
- Owner: Village of Rosemont
- Capacity: Concert: 18,200 – 22,000; Basketball: 17,500; Ice hockey: 16,692; Arena football: 16,143
- Surface: Multi-surface
- Public transit: Blue at Rosemont; NCS at Rosemont

Construction
- Groundbreaking: September 12, 1978
- Opened: May 11, 1980
- Cost: $20 million
- Architect: Anthony M. Rossi Architects
- General contractors: Degen & Rosato Construction Co.

Tenants
- Chicago Wolves (IHL/AHL) (1994–present); Chicago Horizons (MISL) (1980–1981); DePaul Blue Demons men's basketball (NCAA D-1) (1980–2017); Chicago Sting (MISL) (1984–1988); Chicago Bruisers (AFL) (1987–1989); Loyola Ramblers men's basketball (NCAA D-1) (1989–1994); Chicago Power (NPSL/AISA) (1988–1996); Chicago Express (WBL) (1988); Chicago Rush (AFL) (2001–2013); Chicago Sky (WNBA) (2010–2017); Northwestern Wildcats men's basketball (NCAA D-1) (2017–2018)

Website
- allstatearena.com

Allstate Arena is a multi-purpose arena in Rosemont, Illinois, United States, northwest of Chicago, located at the corner of Mannheim Road and Lunt Avenue, just north of Mannheim Road's interchange with the Jane Addams Memorial Tollway (I-90) about 3 miles (4.8 km) north of O'Hare International Airport. The facility opened in 1980 as the Rosemont Horizon and seats up to 22,000 for concerts, 17,500 for basketball, 16,692 for ice hockey and 16,143 for arena football.

The arena is home to the Chicago Wolves of the American Hockey League (AHL) and has served as the home arena for a number of other professional and collegiate teams, most notably the DePaul Blue Demons from 1980 through 2017.

== History ==
The Village of Rosemont issued $19 million in bonds to finance the cost of the arena with exclusive contracts with Araserv, the Ringling Bros. and Barnum & Bailey Circus, and MFG International.

On August 13, 1979, the uncompleted roof of the Rosemont Horizon collapsed, killing five construction workers and injuring 16 others. The collapse was featured in the "Engineering Disasters" episode of Modern Marvels, first broadcast by The History Channel on April 20, 2006.

One distinctive feature of the Allstate Arena is its timber roof, designed to muffle the sounds of any passing aircraft descending into and taking off from nearby O'Hare International Airport.

The facility, originally named Rosemont Horizon, was intended to be the home of the Chicago Horizons of the Major Indoor Soccer League (MISL) and was home of the 1980–1981 season but the franchise folded in 1982. It was also intended to be the home of the WHA's Chicago Cougars, but the team folded in 1975, three years before the arena broke ground. The first concert held at the Horizon was Fleetwood Mac on May 15, 1980, as they cut a red ribbon on the stage during the opening of the show.

Insurance company Allstate signed a 10-year contract worth more than $10 million on June 9, 1999, to acquire naming rights to the arena and renovate it.

On December 14, 2003, the floor at the Allstate Arena was named "Ray and Marge Meyer Court" in honor of Basketball Hall of Famer Ray Meyer and his wife. Meyer coached DePaul's men's team for 42 seasons and is the school's all-time winningest coach.

== Events ==
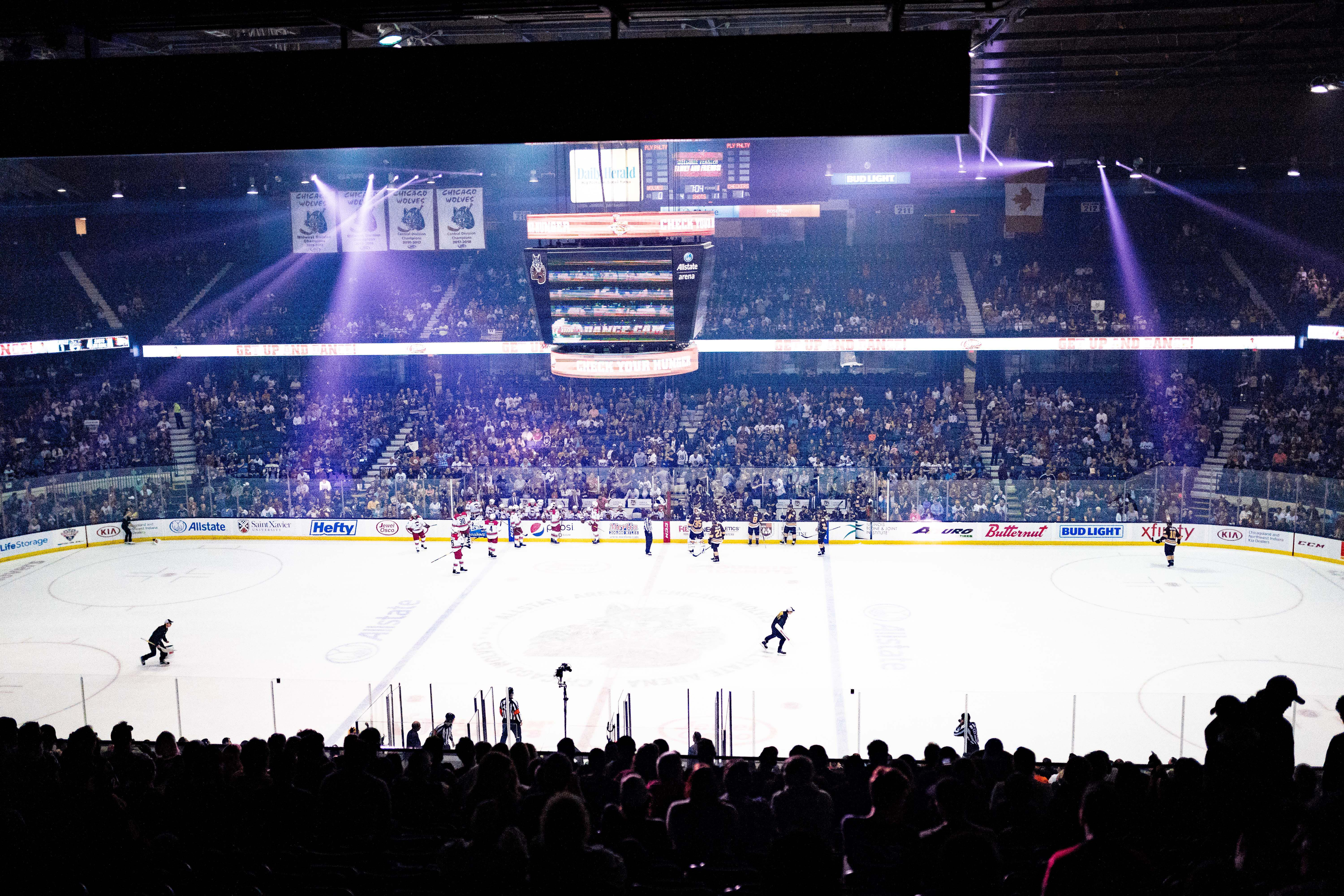
Arena during the 2019 Calder Cup Finals

=== Sports ===
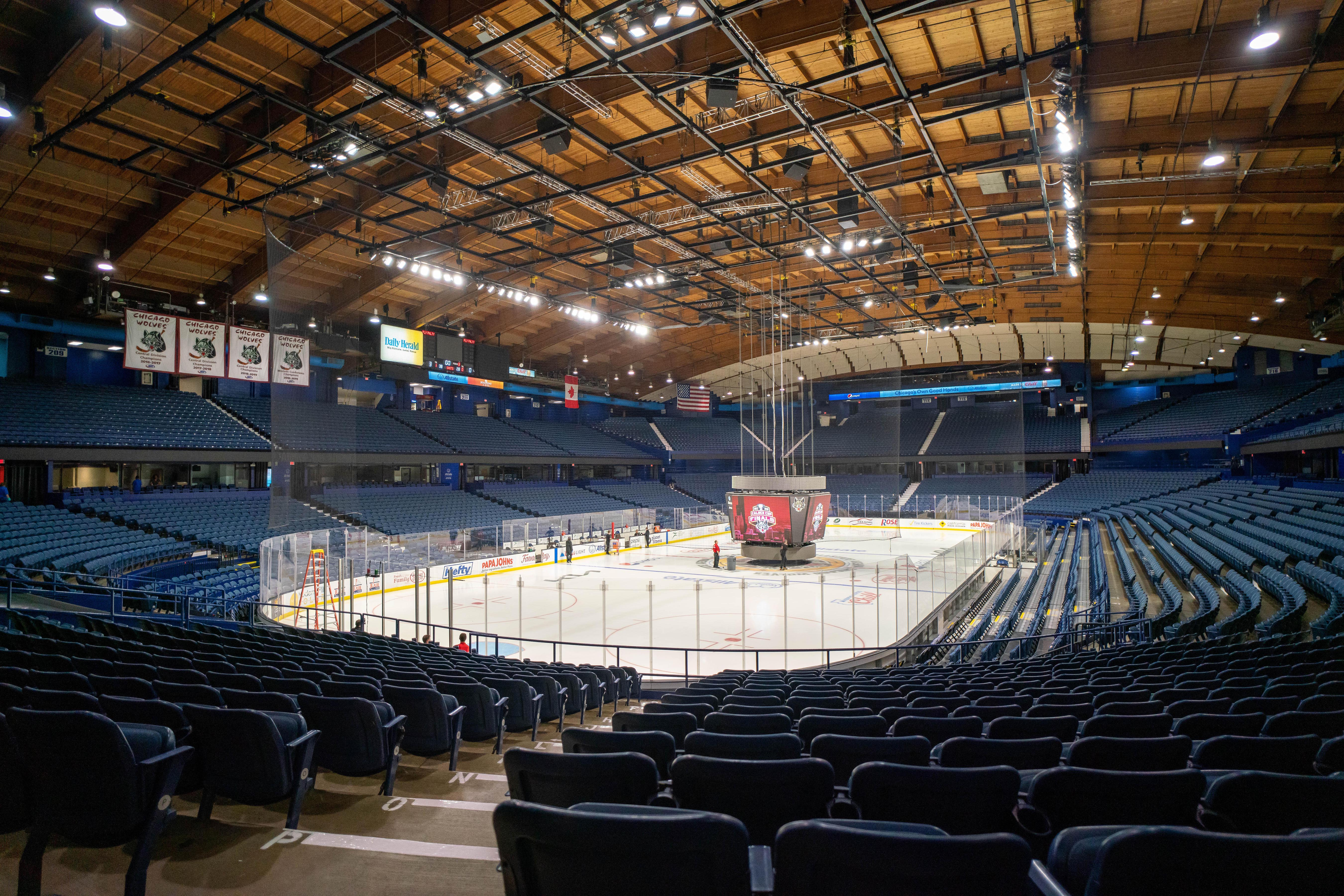
Arena being set up for hockey ahead of game 1 of the 2022 Calder Cup Finals

Allstate Arena has been the home of the Chicago Wolves of the American Hockey League since they were inaugurated in 1994.

Allstate Arena was the home of DePaul University men's basketball team until the end of the 2016–17 season. The Blue Demons previously played on campus at Alumni Hall. That gym has since been replaced with McGrath-Phillips Arena, home to the women's basketball program through that team's 2016–17 season. The building hosted the NCAA Division I men's basketball tournament three times: the 1987 and 1993 Midwest Regional first and second-round games, and the 2005 Chicago Regional Finals.

The Arena Football League also has a long history with Allstate Arena. The Horizon hosted an arena football test game in 1987 and the Chicago Bruisers were an original Arena Football League team when the league began in 1987. The Bruisers played from 1987 to 1989, and hosted ArenaBowl II in Rosemont, losing to the Detroit Drive, 24–13. In 2001, Arena Football returned to the arena with the Chicago Rush. The Rush increased its home attendance each year from 2001 to 2008, and from 2004 to 2008 averaged between 14,000 and 16,000 fans per game. The Rush's highest home attendance is 16,391 on June 23, 2007, against the Kansas City Brigade. After the AFL restructured in 2009, the Rush returned to the Arena Football League.

On October 25, 2008, the Allstate Arena hosted UFC 90, the first Ultimate Fighting Championship event in the state of Illinois.

The Professional Bull Riders brought their Built Ford Tough Series tour for events in 2006 and 2008. As of 2018, the tour has held the Chicago Invitational event here every year since 2010. PBR plans to continue this event in Chicago in 2019.

The arena is where the monster truck racing track style known as "Chicago-style" was created.

The Chicago Sky of the WNBA announced on August 17, 2009, that the team reached a multi-year lease with the arena.

In 1989, Loyola Ramblers men's basketball became tenants of the arena, moving from the International Amphitheatre. The team played its home games at the Rosemont Horizon during their 1989–90, 1990–91, 1991–92, 1992–93, and 1993–94 seasons before moving to a renovated Alumni Gym on their campus.

During the 2012–13 NHL lockout, Allstate Arena was the site of the Champs for Charity Hockey Game where current and former Chicago Blackhawks hosted fellow NHL players in front of 10,000+ fans.

DePaul left the arena after the 2016–17 season for the new Wintrust Arena in Chicago, leaving the arena without a permanent college basketball tenant, although Northwestern University moved its men's home basketball games to the arena temporarily for the 2017–18 season before returning to its on-campus home at Welsh–Ryan Arena in Evanston, after a full-academic-year renovation of that facility.

The Professional Women's Hockey League (PWHL) played two neutral site games at the arena: the first on December 21, 2025 between the Ottawa Charge and Minnesota Frost and the second on March 25, 2026 between the New York Sirens and Seattle Torrent, the first PWHL games in the Chicago area. The first game saw the Charge win 3–2 in overtime in front of 7,238 fans. The second game saw the Torrent won 4–1 in front of 10,006 fans.

==== Championships and playoffs ====
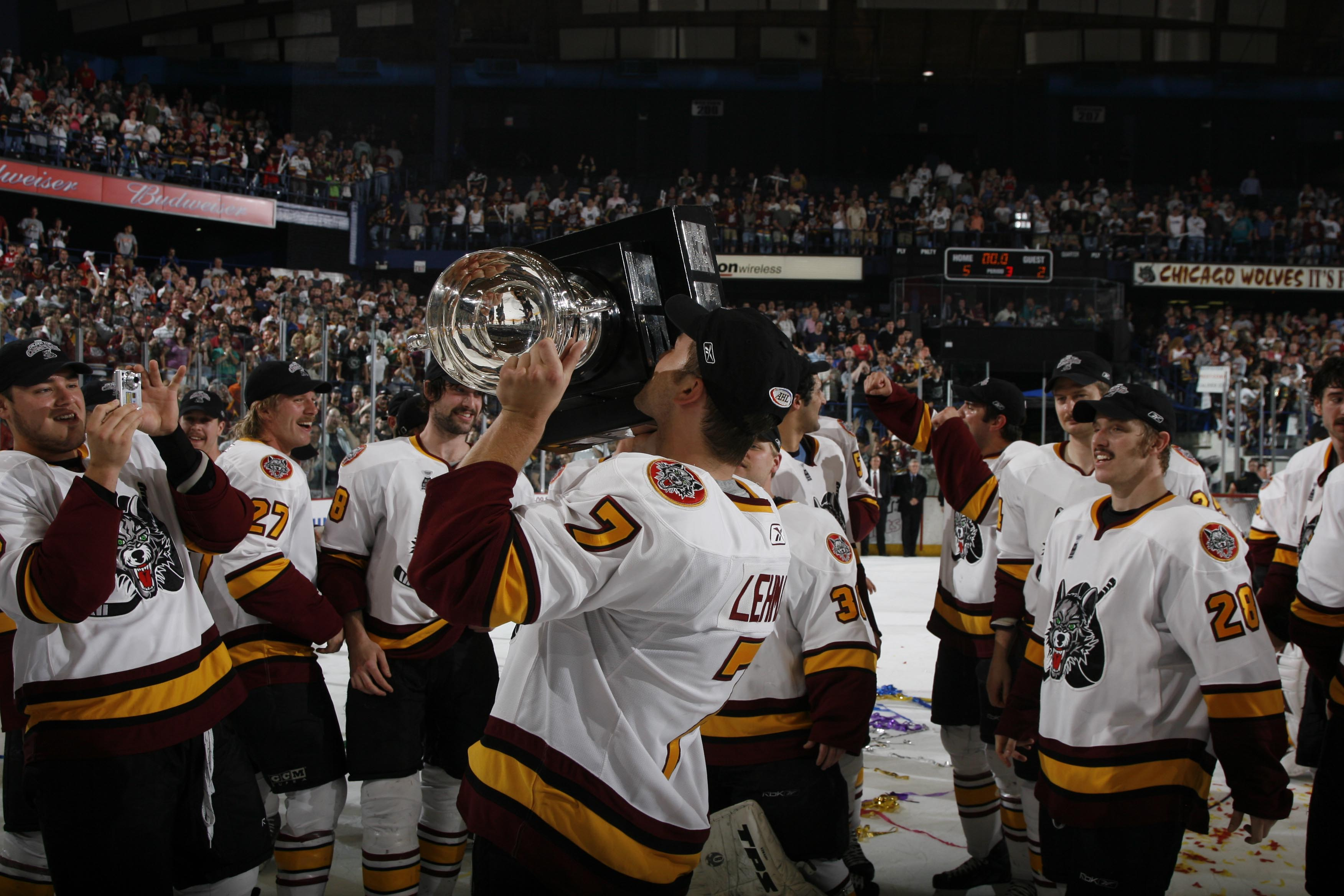
2008 Calder Cup Finals

- AFL ArenaBowl II
- AHL Calder Cup
  - Qualifier (Western Conference): 2002
  - Western Conference Quarterfinals: 2002, 2003 West Division Semifinals 2004, 2005, 2007, 2008, 2010 Western Conference Quarterfinals: 2012, 2014, 2015
  - Western Conference Semifinals: 2002, 2003 West Division Finals: 2004, 2005, 2007, 2008, 2010 Western Conference Semifinals: 2014
  - Western Conference Finals: 2002, 2005, 2007, 2008
  - Calder Cup Finals: 2002, 2005, 2008, 2019, 2022
- IHL Turner Cup
  - 1/8 Finals: 1994–95, 1995–96, 1996–97, 1997–98
  - Quarterfinals: 1995–96 Western Conference Quarterfinals: 1997–98, 1998–99, 1999–2000, 2000–01
  - Semifinals (Western Conference): 1999–2000, 2000–01
  - Turner Cup Finals: 1999–2000, 2000–01
- WNBA Playoffs
  - WNBA Eastern Conference Semifinals: 2013, 2014, 2015 WNBA Playoffs Second Round: 2016
  - WNBA Eastern Conference Finals: 2013, 2014 WNBA Semifinals: 2016

=== Professional wrestling ===
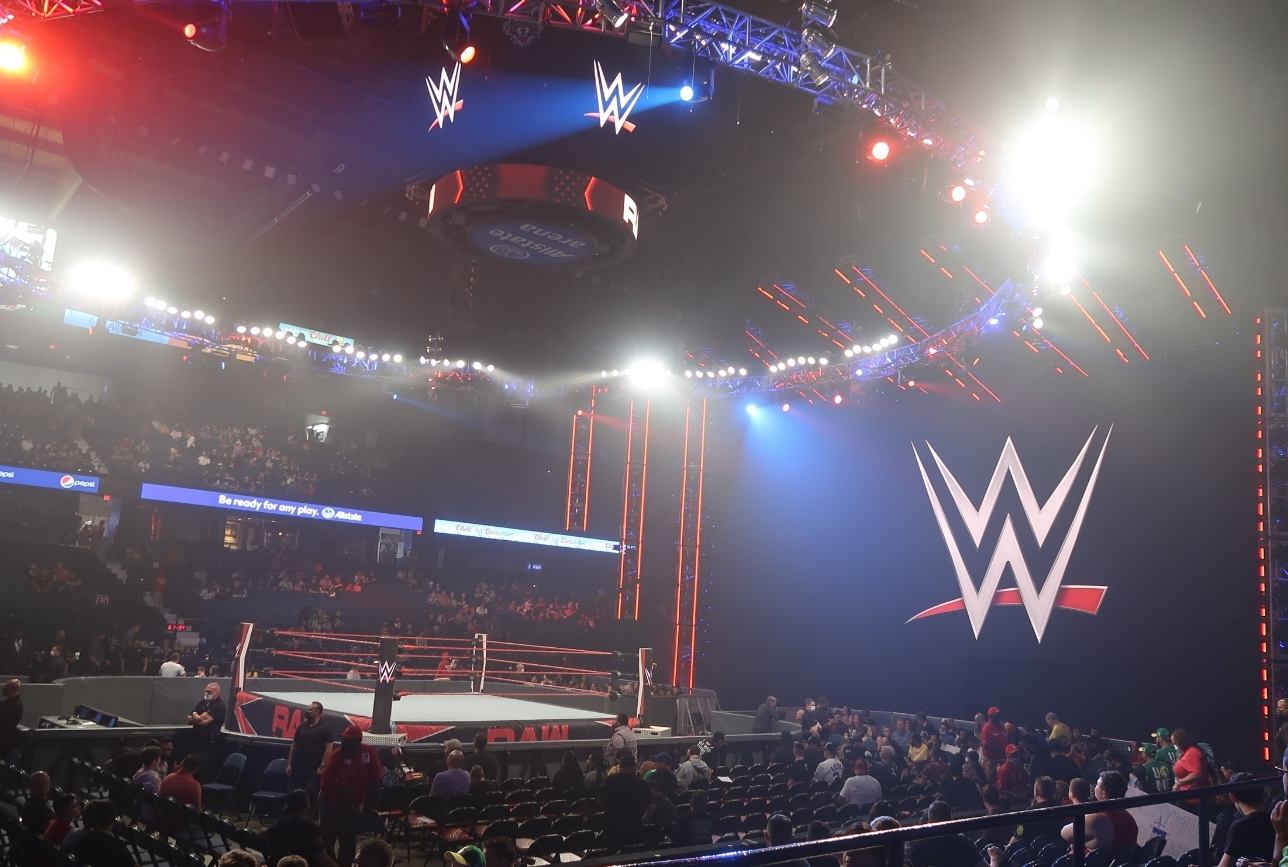
Allstate Arena before the airing of WWE Raw in August 2021

The Allstate Arena is the standard venue for WWE events in Chicago. For decades, WWE's most prominent figures have appeared at this venue. These include Hulk Hogan, Bret Hart, Ric Flair, The Rock, "Stone Cold" Steve Austin, John Cena, Triple H, Roman Reigns, and Chicago native CM Punk. Since 1986, WWE has held numerous pay-per-view, non-televised, NXT, Raw, and SmackDown shows in the arena. Allstate Arena is also one of two venues (the other being Madison Square Garden) to host WrestleMania three times: namely the second segment of WrestleMania 2 in 1986, WrestleMania 13 in 1997, and WrestleMania 22 in 2006—the last WrestleMania to date to be held in an arena setting (all future events have primarily been held in larger-capacity football stadiums, barring WrestleMania 36 which was filmed in a closed studio at the WWE Performance Center in Orlando due to the COVID-19 pandemic).

The venue has also hosted The Wrestling Classic in 1985, three editions of Survivor Series (1989, 2019, and 2023), No Mercy 2007, Night of Champions 2010, two editions of Judgment Day (1998 and 2009), two editions of Extreme Rules (2012 and 2015), two editions of Backlash (2001 and 2017), two editions of Money in the Bank (2011 and 2018), three editions of Payback (2013, 2014 and 2016), the two editions of NXT TakeOver: Chicago (2017, 2018), 2019 NXT TakeOver: WarGames, 2022 Hell in a Cell, and 2026 Worlds Collide.

As of 2026, there have only been four instances where WWE has hosted an event in Chicago outside the Allstate Arena; that being SummerSlam 1994, a WWE Road To WrestleMania (34) Live Event, a 2018 Holiday Tour Live Event, and Elimination Chamber 2026, all held at the United Center.

When the arena was known as Rosemont Horizon, the venue hosted American Wrestling Association (AWA) events in the Chicago area during the 1980s, replacing the International Amphitheatre. It was also the standard venue for World Championship Wrestling (WCW) events in the Chicago area during the mid-1990s, replacing the UIC Pavilion. WCW held Spring Stampede at the arena in April 1994, as well as an episode of WCW Monday Nitro in October 1995. However, it would later switch to using the United Center for its shows in the region.

=== Concerts ===
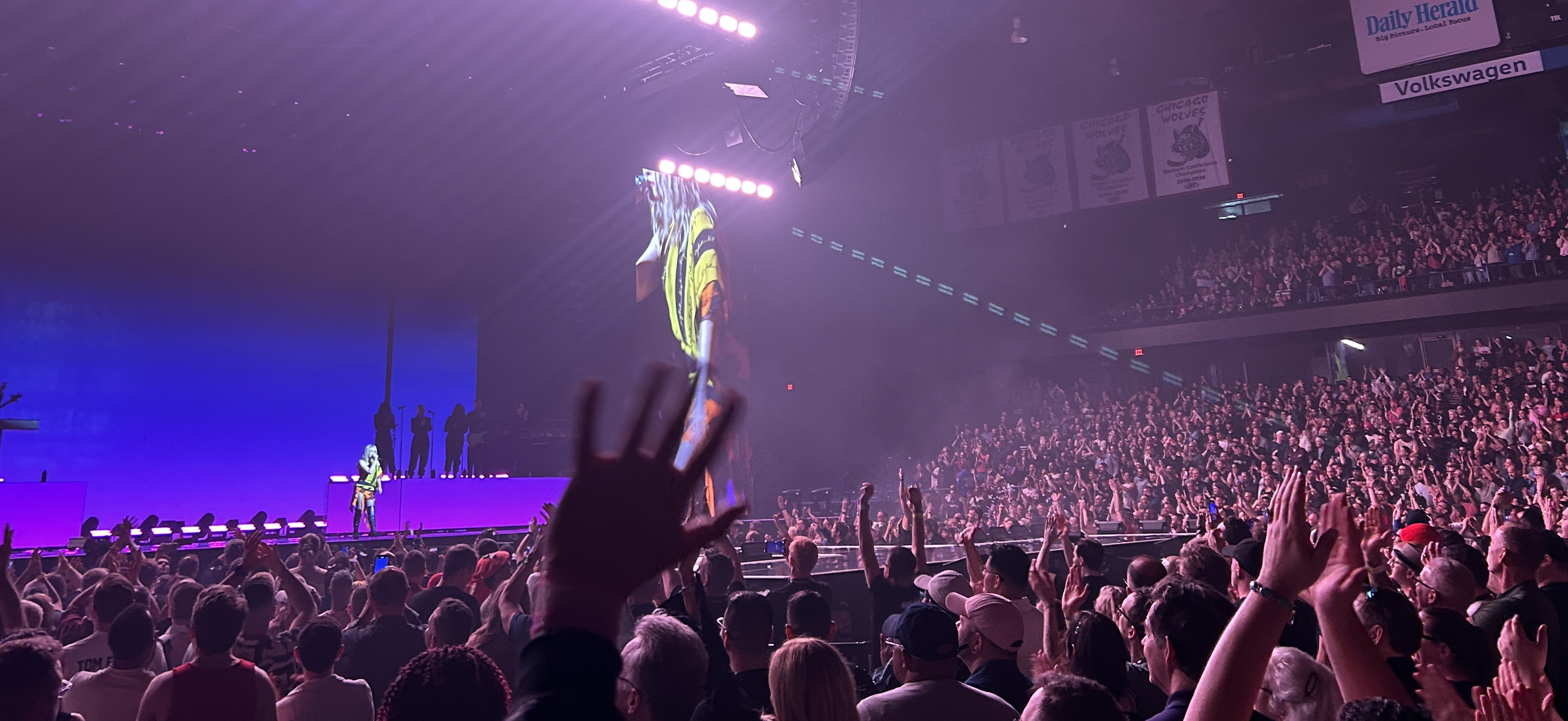
Kylie Minogue performing at the arena in 2025 on her Tension Tour

The arena has been the site of many concerts, including by Luis Miguel, Bob Dylan, The Rolling Stones, The Who, Fleetwood Mac, Oasis, Bon Jovi, Van Halen, ZZ Top, Prince, Peter Gabriel, Ghost, Whitney Houston, Michael Jackson, Garth Brooks, The Cure, Mariah Carey, Cher, U2, Bruce Springsteen, Madonna, Elton John, George Michael, Janet Jackson, Britney Spears, BTS, Ateez, Blackpink, Taylor Swift, Billy Strings, Ariana Grande, Scorpions, AC/DC, Iron Maiden, Tina Turner, Metallica, Andrea Bocelli, Green Day, Phish, Mötley Crüe, My Chemical Romance, Marilyn Manson, Nine Inch Nails, Ricky Martin, Lorde, Justin Timberlake, Foo Fighters, R.E.M., Justin Bieber, Queen, Rauw Alejandro, IU, Trans-Siberian Orchestra, Kylie Minogue, (G)I-dle, Ive, Enhypen, NCT Dream, Tomorrow X Together, Suga, Charli XCX, Reneé Rapp, Benson Boone, Melanie Martinez, Babymonster, J-Hope, Dolly Parton, Kenny Rogers, and The Wiggles.

The Grateful Dead played thirteen shows between December 1981 and April 1994 at the Rosemount and the Jerry Garcia Band played a show in November 1991.

The arena was the site of a January 1982 concert from Ozzy Osbourne, where a famous photo taken by photographer Paul Natkin shows Osbourne lofting guitarist Randy Rhoads in the air. The photo later became the cover to the 1987 live album Tribute released five years after Rhoads' tragic death in a plane crash on March 19, 1982.

Survivor performed at the arena on January 19, 1985 to a sold-out crowd during their “Vital Signs” Tour.

Styx recorded their reunion live album, Return to Paradise, at the arena on September 21, 1996.

In September 2014, Garth Brooks began his comeback World Tour at the venue, setting a record with an 11-show run over seven days and 186,000 tickets sold.

Gabriel Iglesias's Netflix special, I'm Sorry for What I Said When I Was Hungry, was filmed at the arena in 2016.

==== Creed incident ====
On December 29, 2002, rock band Creed were set to perform on tour promoting their album Weathered. Lead singer Scott Stapp (who had endured a widely publicized addiction to alcohol) arrived to the performance too intoxicated to enunciate any lyrics. The band performed three songs before Stapp's incoherent behavior began to noticeably affect their ability to perform. Four concertgoers sued Stapp and the band for failing to complete their performance, though this lawsuit was ultimately dismissed, and many criticized Stapp for his behavior throughout the incident. Creed later issued an apology on Stapp's behalf.

=== Reagan-Bush rally ===
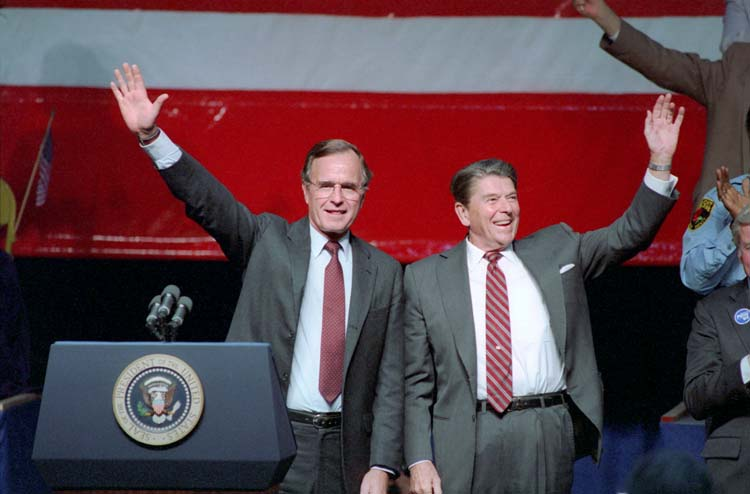
George H. W. Bush and Ronald Reagan holding a 1984 campaign rally in the arena

On November 4, 1984, Ronald Reagan and George H. W. Bush held a campaign rally in the Horizon, two days before the 1984 presidential election.

Tenants
Preceded by first arena	Home of Chicago Express; 1988	Succeeded by Prairie Capital Convention Center
Preceded by Chicago Stadium	Home of Chicago Sting; 1984–1988	Succeeded by last arena
Preceded by first arena	Home of Chicago Rush; 2001–present	Succeeded by current
Preceded by UIC Pavilion	Home of Chicago Sky; 2010–2017	Succeeded by Wintrust Arena
Preceded by first arena	Home of Chicago Skyliners; 2000–2002	Succeeded by Las Vegas Sports Center
Preceded by first arena	Home of Chicago Wolves; 1994–present	Succeeded by current
Preceded by Alumni Hall	Home of DePaul Blue Demons; 1980–2017	Succeeded by Wintrust Arena
Preceded by Welsh–Ryan Arena	Home of Northwestern Wildcats; 2017–2018	Succeeded by Welsh–Ryan Arena

Events
Preceded by Pittsburgh Civic Arena	Host of ArenaBowl; 1988	Succeeded by Joe Louis Arena
Preceded by Madison Square Garden	Host of WrestleMania 2 w/ Nassau Coliseum & L.A. Sports Arena; 1986	Succeeded by Pontiac Silverdome
Preceded by Arrowhead Pond	Host of WrestleMania 13; 1997	Succeeded by Fleet Center
Preceded by Staples Center	Host of WrestleMania 22; 2006	Succeeded by Ford Field
Preceded by Sprint Center	Host of WWE Money in the Bank; 2011	Succeeded by US Airways Center
