= 2002 Calder Cup playoffs =

North American ice hockey tournament

Tournament details
- Dates: April 9 – June 3, 2002
- Teams: 16
- Defending champions: Saint John Flames (did not qualify)

Final positions
- Champions: Chicago Wolves
- Runners-up: Bridgeport Sound Tigers

The 2002 Calder Cup playoffs of the American Hockey League began on April 9, 2002. Twenty teams, the top ten from each conference, qualified for the playoffs. The seventh-, eighth-, ninth-, and tenth-placed teams in each conference played best-of-three series in the qualifying round. The four winners, in addition to the other twelve teams that qualified, played best-of-five series for conference quarterfinals. The remaining 8 teams played best-of-seven series for conference semifinals and conference finals. The conference champions played a best-of-seven series for the Calder Cup. The Calder Cup Final ended on June 3, 2002 with the Chicago Wolves defeating the Bridgeport Sound Tigers four games to one to win the first Calder Cup in team history.

Chicago's Pasi Nurminen won the Jack A. Butterfield Trophy as AHL playoff MVP. Teammate Rob Brown recorded 26 assists, tying an AHL playoff record. The Chicago Wolves as a team also set three AHL playoff records during their Calder Cup run by playing 25 games, winning 17 games in one playoff, and winning 12 home games in one playoff.

== Playoff seeds ==
After the 2001–02 AHL regular season, 20 teams qualified for the playoffs. The top ten teams from each conference qualified for the playoffs. The Bridgeport Sound Tigers were the Eastern Conference regular season champions as well as the Macgregor Kilpatrick Trophy winners with the best overall regular season record. The Syracuse Crunch were the Western Conference regular season champions. Division champions were automatically ranked 1-3.

=== Eastern Conference ===
1. Bridgeport Sound Tigers – East Division and Eastern Conference regular season champions; Macgregor Kilpatrick Trophy winners, 98 points
2. Lowell Lock Monsters – North Division champions, 96 points
3. Quebec Citadelles – Canadian Division champions, 88 points
4. Hartford Wolf Pack – 95 points
5. Manchester Monarchs – 90 points
6. Hamilton Bulldogs – 87 points
7. St. John's Maple Leafs – 87 points
8. Worcester IceCats – 86 points
9. Manitoba Moose – 86 points
10. Providence Bruins – 82 points

=== Western Conference ===
1. Syracuse Crunch – Central Division and Western Conference regular season champions, 96 points
2. Grand Rapids Griffins – West Division champions, 95 points
3. Norfolk Admirals – South Division champions, 92 points
4. Houston Aeros – 93 points
5. Utah Grizzlies – 91 points
6. Hershey Bears – 89 points
7. Chicago Wolves – 86 points
8. Philadelphia Phantoms – 86 points
9. Rochester Americans – 82 points
10. Cincinnati Mighty Ducks – 80 points

== Bracket ==
Conference Qualifiers
7	St. John's	2
10	Providence	0
8	Worcester	1
9	Manitoba	2
7	Chicago	2
10	Cincinnati	1
8	Philadelphia	2
9	Rochester	0

Conference Quarterfinals
1	Bridgeport	3
9	Manitoba	1
2	Lowell	2
7	St. John's	3
Eastern Conference
3	Quebec	0
6	Hamilton	3
4	Hartford	3
5	Manchester	2
1	Syracuse	3
8	Philadelphia	0
2	Grand Rapids	2
7	Chicago	3
Western Conference
3	Norfolk	1
6	Hershey	3
4	Houston	3
5	Utah	2

Conference Semifinals
1	Bridgeport	4
7	St. John's	0
4	Hartford	1
6	Hamilton	4
1	Syracuse	3
7	Chicago	4
4	Houston	4
6	Hershey	0

Conference Finals
1	Bridgeport	4
6	Hamilton	3
4	Houston	1
7	Chicago	4

Calder Cup Final
E1	Bridgeport	1
W7	Chicago	4

The top 6 teams in each conference receive byes to the Conference Quarterfinals. In each round, the highest remaining seed in each conference is matched against the lowest remaining seed. In the qualification round, all games are played at the arena of the higher seed. In each round the higher seed receives home ice advantage, meaning they receive the "extra" game on home-ice if the series reaches the maximum number of games. There is no set series format for each series after the Qualification Round due to arena scheduling conflicts and travel considerations.

== Conference Qualifiers ==
Note 1: All times are in Eastern Time (UTC−4).
Note 2: Game times in italics signify games to be played only if necessary.
Note 3: Home team is listed first.

=== Eastern Conference ===
==== (7) St. John's Maple Leafs vs. (10) Providence Bruins ====
April 10	St. John's Maple Leafs	3 – 1^{1}	Providence Bruins

April 11	St. John's Maple Leafs	4 – 1^{2}	Providence Bruins

St. John's won series 2 – 0

^{1} – at Toronto
^{2} – at Brampton, Ontario

==== (8) Worcester IceCats vs. (9) Manitoba Moose ====
April 9	Worcester IceCats	2 – 3	Manitoba Moose	Worcester's Centrum Centre

April 10	Worcester IceCats	4 – 2	Manitoba Moose	Worcester's Centrum Centre

April 11	Worcester IceCats	2 – 3	2OT	Manitoba Moose	Worcester's Centrum Centre

Manitoba won series 2 – 1

=== Western Conference ===
==== (7) Chicago Wolves vs. (10) Cincinnati Mighty Ducks ====
April 9	Chicago Wolves	2 – 3	Cincinnati Mighty Ducks	Allstate Arena

April 10	Chicago Wolves	3 – 2	2OT	Cincinnati Mighty Ducks	Allstate Arena

April 11	Chicago Wolves	3 – 2	Cincinnati Mighty Ducks	Allstate Arena

Chicago won series 2 – 1

==== (8) Philadelphia Phantoms vs. (9) Rochester Americans ====
April 9	Philadelphia Phantoms	4 – 2	Rochester Americans	First Union Spectrum

April 11	Philadelphia Phantoms	3 – 2	Rochester Americans	First Union Spectrum

Philadelphia won series 2 – 0

== Conference Quarterfinals ==
=== Eastern Conference ===
==== (1) Bridgeport Sound Tigers vs. (9) Manitoba Moose ====
April 14	Bridgeport Sound Tigers	5 – 0	Manitoba Moose	Arena at Harbor Yard

April 16	Bridgeport Sound Tigers	4 – 1	Manitoba Moose	Arena at Harbor Yard

April 18	Manitoba Moose	6 – 2	Bridgeport Sound Tigers	Winnipeg Arena

April 19	Manitoba Moose	0 – 2	Bridgeport Sound Tigers	Winnipeg Arena

Bridgeport won series 3 – 1

==== (2) Lowell Lock Monsters vs. (7) St. John's Maple Leafs ====
April 14	Lowell Lock Monsters	3 – 2	St. John's Maple Leafs	Tsongas Arena

April 16	Lowell Lock Monsters	4 – 1	St. John's Maple Leafs	Tsongas Arena

April 18	St. John's Maple Leafs	6 – 4	Lowell Lock Monsters	Mile One Stadium

April 20	St. John's Maple Leafs	2 – 0	Lowell Lock Monsters	Mile One Stadium

April 23	Lowell Lock Monsters	0 – 3	St. John's Maple Leafs	Tsongas Arena

St. John's won series 3 – 2

==== (3) Quebec Citadelles vs. (6) Hamilton Bulldogs ====
April 13	Quebec Citadelles	3 – 4	OT	Hamilton Bulldogs	Colisée Pepsi

April 15	Quebec Citadelles	1 – 3	Hamilton Bulldogs	Colisée Pepsi

April 17	Hamilton Bulldogs	6 – 5	OT	Quebec Citadelles	Copps Coliseum

Hamilton won series 3 – 0

==== (4) Hartford Wolf Pack vs. (5) Manchester Monarchs ====
April 13	Hartford Wolf Pack	5 – 3	Manchester Monarchs	Hartford Civic Center

April 14	Hartford Wolf Pack	3 – 4	Manchester Monarchs	Hartford Civic Center

April 17	Manchester Monarchs	6 – 2	Hartford Wolf Pack	Verizon Wireless Arena

April 19	Manchester Monarchs	1 – 3	Hartford Wolf Pack	Verizon Wireless Arena

April 20	Hartford Wolf Pack	3 – 2	2OT	Manchester Monarchs	Hartford Civic Center

Hartford won series 3 – 2

=== Western Conference ===
==== (1) Syracuse Crunch vs. (8) Philadelphia Phantoms ====
April 13	Syracuse Crunch	5 – 3	Philadelphia Phantoms	War Memorial at Oncenter

April 17	Syracuse Crunch	4 – 1	Philadelphia Phantoms	War Memorial at Oncenter

April 21	Philadelphia Phantoms	1 – 3	Syracuse Crunch	First Union Center

Syracuse won series 3 – 0

==== (2) Grand Rapids Griffins vs. (7) Chicago Wolves ====
April 13	Grand Rapids Griffins	4 – 1	Chicago Wolves	Van Andel Arena

April 15	Grand Rapids Griffins	1 – 5	Chicago Wolves	Van Andel Arena

April 17	Chicago Wolves	2 – 1	Grand Rapids Griffins	Allstate Arena

April 19	Chicago Wolves	0 – 3	Grand Rapids Griffins	Allstate Arena

April 21	Grand Rapids Griffins	2 – 4	Chicago Wolves	Van Andel Arena

Chicago won series 3 – 2

==== (3) Norfolk Admirals vs. (6) Hershey Bears ====
April 12	Norfolk Admirals	4 – 1	Hershey Bears	Norfolk Scope

April 13	Norfolk Admirals	2 – 3	Hershey Bears	Norfolk Scope

April 17	Hershey Bears	3 – 1	Norfolk Admirals	Hersheypark Arena

April 19	Hershey Bears	2 – 1	2OT	Norfolk Admirals	Hersheypark Arena

Hershey won series 3 – 1

==== (4) Houston Aeros vs. (5) Utah Grizzlies ====
April 11	Houston Aeros	4 – 0	Utah Grizzlies	Compaq Center

April 13	Houston Aeros	2 – 3	OT	Utah Grizzlies	Compaq Center

April 16	Utah Grizzlies	2 – 1	Houston Aeros	E Center

April 18	Utah Grizzlies	0 – 2	Houston Aeros	E Center

April 20	Houston Aeros	3 – 2	Utah Grizzlies	Compaq Center

Houston won series 3 – 2

== Conference semifinals ==
=== Eastern Conference ===
==== (1) Bridgeport Sound Tigers vs. (7) St. John's Maple Leafs ====
April 26	Bridgeport Sound Tigers	4 – 2	St. John's Maple Leafs	Arena at Harbor Yard

April 27	Bridgeport Sound Tigers	2 – 1	OT	St. John's Maple Leafs	Arena at Harbor Yard

April 29	St. John's Maple Leafs	2 – 3	2OT	Bridgeport Sound Tigers	Mile One Stadium

May 1	St. John's Maple Leafs	2 – 7	Bridgeport Sound Tigers	Mile One Stadium

Bridgeport won series 4 – 0

==== (4) Hartford Wolf Pack vs. (6) Hamilton Bulldogs ====
April 25	Hartford Wolf Pack	2 – 3	OT	Hamilton Bulldogs	Hartford Civic Center

April 26	Hartford Wolf Pack	3 – 2	2OT	Hamilton Bulldogs	Hartford Civic Center

April 29	Hamilton Bulldogs	4 – 1	Hartford Wolf Pack	Copps Coliseum

April 30	Hamilton Bulldogs	4 – 2	Hartford Wolf Pack	Copps Coliseum

May 2	Hamilton Bulldogs	5 – 2	Hartford Wolf Pack	Copps Coliseum

Hamilton won series 4 – 1

=== Western Conference ===
==== (1) Syracuse Crunch vs. (7) Chicago Wolves ====
April 26	Syracuse Crunch	3 – 0	Chicago Wolves	War Memorial at Oncenter

April 27	Syracuse Crunch	3 – 1	Chicago Wolves	War Memorial at Oncenter

April 29	Chicago Wolves	4 – 2	Syracuse Crunch	Allstate Arena

May 1	Chicago Wolves	3 – 1	Syracuse Crunch	Allstate Arena

May 3	Chicago Wolves	3 – 1	Syracuse Crunch	Allstate Arena

May 5	Syracuse Crunch	6 – 0	Chicago Wolves	War Memorial at Oncenter

May 7	Syracuse Crunch	2 – 6	Chicago Wolves	War Memorial at Oncenter

Chicago won series 4 – 3

==== (4) Houston Aeros vs. (6) Hershey Bears ====
April 26	Houston Aeros	3 – 0	Hershey Bears	Compaq Center

April 27	Houston Aeros	3 – 2	2OT	Hershey Bears	Compaq Center

May 1	Hershey Bears	2 – 4	Houston Aeros	Hersheypark Arena

May 3	Hershey Bears	1 – 7	Houston Aeros	Hersheypark Arena

Houston won series 4 – 0

== Conference finals ==
=== Eastern Conference ===
==== (1) Bridgeport Sound Tigers vs. (6) Hamilton Bulldogs ====
May 10	Bridgeport Sound Tigers	3 – 2	Hamilton Bulldogs	Arena at Harbor Yard

May 11	Bridgeport Sound Tigers	3 – 1	Hamilton Bulldogs	Arena at Harbor Yard

May 15	Hamilton Bulldogs	4 – 2	Bridgeport Sound Tigers	Copps Coliseum

May 17	Hamilton Bulldogs	2 – 5	Bridgeport Sound Tigers	Copps Coliseum

May 18	Hamilton Bulldogs	3 – 2	Bridgeport Sound Tigers	Copps Coliseum

May 20	Bridgeport Sound Tigers	2 – 3	OT	Hamilton Bulldogs	Arena at Harbor Yard

May 22	Bridgeport Sound Tigers	3 – 0	Hamilton Bulldogs	Arena at Harbor Yard

Bridgeport won series 4 – 3

=== Western Conference ===
==== (4) Houston Aeros vs. (7) Chicago Wolves ====
May 10	Houston Aeros	6 – 4	Chicago Wolves	Compaq Center

May 11	Houston Aeros	3 – 4	2OT	Chicago Wolves	Compaq Center

May 15	Chicago Wolves	4 – 1	Houston Aeros	Allstate Arena

May 17	Chicago Wolves	2 – 1	Houston Aeros	Allstate Arena

May 19	Chicago Wolves	7 – 0	Houston Aeros	Allstate Arena

Chicago won series 4 – 1

== Calder Cup Final ==
=== (E1) Bridgeport Sound Tigers vs. (W7) Chicago Wolves ===
May 24	Bridgeport Sound Tigers	4 – 5	OT	Chicago Wolves	Arena at Harbor Yard

May 25	Bridgeport Sound Tigers	2 – 1	Chicago Wolves	Arena at Harbor Yard

May 30	Chicago Wolves	4 – 0	Bridgeport Sound Tigers	Allstate Arena

May 31	Chicago Wolves	4 – 2	Bridgeport Sound Tigers	Allstate Arena

June 3	Chicago Wolves	4 – 3	2OT	Bridgeport Sound Tigers	Allstate Arena

Chicago won series 4 – 1

== See also ==
- 2001–02 AHL season
- List of AHL seasons

Preceded by 2001 Calder Cup playoffs	Calder Cup playoffs 2002	Succeeded by 2003 Calder Cup playoffs
