= Bridgeport Islanders =

American Hockey League team in Bridgeport, Connecticut

- City: Bridgeport, Connecticut
- League: American Hockey League
- Conference: Eastern
- Division: Atlantic
- Operated: 2001–2026
- Home arena: Total Mortgage Arena
- Colors: Blue, orange, white
- Owner: Jon Ledecky
- Media: Connecticut Post; MSG Network; News Radio WPOP (1410 AM); AHL.TV (Internet)
- Affiliates: New York Islanders (NHL); Worcester Railers (ECHL)

Franchise history
- 2001–2021: Bridgeport Sound Tigers
- 2021–2026: Bridgeport Islanders
- 2026–present: Hamilton Hammers

Championships
- Regular season titles: 1 (2001–02)
- Division titles: 2 (2001–02, 2011–12)
- Conference titles: 1 (2001–02)
- Calder Cups: 0

The Bridgeport Islanders (formerly the Bridgeport Sound Tigers) were a professional ice hockey team based in Bridgeport, Connecticut. They were the American Hockey League (AHL) affiliate of the National Hockey League's New York Islanders, who owned the franchise. The team started in 2001–02 season and was purchased by the Islanders in 2004. The team played their home games at the Total Mortgage Arena.

The team relocated to Hamilton, Ontario after the 2025–26 AHL Season and became the Hamilton Hammers.

== History ==
The former Bridgeport Sound Tigers logo featuring Storm the Tiger (2000–2021).

The Bridgeport Sound Tigers joined the American Hockey League (AHL) as an expansion franchise in 2001 and were coached by Steve Stirling. The team's name referenced both the Long Island Sound where Bridgeport lies and the circuses of former resident P. T. Barnum, with the Sound Tigers identity being unveiled at the Barnum Museum. In their inaugural season, the team won their division and had the best regular season record to win the Macgregor Kilpatrick Trophy. In the playoffs, they won the Eastern Conference championship and the Richard F. Canning Trophy to advance to the Calder Cup finals against the Chicago Wolves, losing the series 4–1.

In its second season, the team finished second in the division and entered the playoffs as the fifth seed in the conference. The Sound Tigers advanced to the conference semifinals, where they lost to their division champion Binghamton Senators in six games. Stirling was promoted to head coaching position with the New York Islanders and was replaced by Greg Cronin for 2003–04. As the Sound Tigers, the team had limited success, missing the playoffs 10 times and not winning a playoff round since their second season.

On May 10, 2021, it was announced that the team would change its name to the Bridgeport Islanders beginning with the 2021–22 season.

The team finished the 2024–25 season with a 15–50–4–3 record, its worst record in team history. Alongside this, they finished with a home record of 4–28–1–3, setting the record for the fewest home wins in a season for an AHL team.

The team relocated to Hamilton, Ontario, for the 2026–27 season, playing at the TD Coliseum, following unanimous approval by the AHL Board of Governors. They became the Hamilton Hammers on May 21, 2026.

== Team identity ==
=== Mascot ===
The lone mascot of the Bridgeport Islanders was an anthropomorphic blue tiger named Storm. He appeared at home games sporting a jersey with the number 01 (short for the year the team was founded). While Storm could usually be found exciting fans throughout the arena, he skated on the ice during periodic intermissions. Storm's appearance has changed since the team's inaugural season. Storm weathered the storm since the club's change to the Islanders moniker and was a regular at home games.

=== Rivalries ===
The main (and instate) rival of the Islanders were the Hartford Wolf Pack, the AHL affiliate of the New York Rangers (the main rival of the Bridgeport Islanders' parent club, the New York Islanders). The games became known as the Battle of Connecticut.

== Season-by-season results ==
Regular season												Playoffs					
Season	Games	Won	Lost	Tied	OTL	SOL	Points	PCT	Goals for	Goals against	Standing	Year	Qual Round	1st round	2nd round	3rd round	Finals
2001–02	80	43	25	8	4	—	98	.613	240	192	1st, East	2002	—	W, 3–1, MAN	W, 4–0 SJM	W, 4–3, HAM	L, 1–4, CHI
2002–03	80	40	26	11	3	—	94	.588	219	198	2nd, East	2003	—	W, 3–0, MAN	L, 2–4, BNG	—	—
2003–04	80	41	23	12	4	—	98	.613	178	140	2nd, East	2004	—	L, 3–4, WBS	—	—	—
2004–05	80	37	38	—	1	4	79	.494	192	222	6th, East	2005	Did not qualify				
2005–06	80	38	33	—	6	3	85	.531	246	253	4th, East	2006	N/A	L, 3–4, WBS	—	—	—
2006–07	80	36	37	—	1	6	79	.494	229	267	5th, East	2007	Did not qualify				
2007–08	80	40	36	—	1	3	84	.525	225	240	5th, East	2008	Did not qualify				
2008–09	80	49	23	—	3	5	106	.663	241	212	2nd, East	2009	N/A	L, 1–4, WBS	—	—	—
2009–10	80	38	32	—	4	6	86	.538	201	220	5th, Atlantic	2010	N/A	L, 1–4, HER	—	—	—
2010–11	80	30	39	—	4	7	67	.444	209	256	7th, Atlantic	2011	Did not qualify				
2011–12	76	41	26	—	3	6	91	.599	233	219	1st, Northeast	2012	N/A	L, 0–3, CON	—	—	—
2012–13	76	32	32	—	7	5	76	.449	218	242	3rd, Northeast	2013	Did not qualify				
2013–14	76	28	40	—	2	6	64	.421	183	238	5th, Northeast	2014	Did not qualify				
2014–15	76	28	40	—	7	1	64	.421	213	246	5th, Northeast	2015	Did not qualify				
2015–16	76	40	29	—	4	3	87	.572	209	220	5th, Atlantic	2016	N/A	L, 0–3, TOR	—	—	—
2016–17	76	44	28	—	3	1	92	.605	220	212	5th, Atlantic	2017	Did not qualify				
2017–18	76	36	32	—	5	3	80	.526	206	214	5th, Atlantic	2018	Did not qualify				
2018–19	76	43	24	—	6	3	95	.625	233	228	2nd, Atlantic	2019	N/A	L, 2–3, HER	—	—	—
2019–20	63	23	33	—	5	2	53	.421	152	206	8th, Atlantic	2020	Season cancelled due to the COVID-19 pandemic				
2020–21	24	8	14	—	2	0	18	.375	59	81	3rd, Atlantic	2021	No playoffs				
2021–22	72	31	30	—	7	4	73	.507	213	226	6th, Atlantic	2022	W, 2–0, PRO	L, 1–3, CLT	—	—	—
2022–23	72	34	30	—	7	1	76	.528	238	248	7th, Atlantic	2023	Did not qualify				
2023–24	72	25	38	—	7	2	59	.410	162	222	8th, Atlantic	2024	Did not qualify				
2024–25	72	15	50	—	4	3	37	.257	181	294	8th, Atlantic	2025	Did not qualify				
2025–26	72	34	30	—	3	5	76	.528	219	222	4th, Atlantic	2026	L, 0–2, HER	—	—	—	—

== Team records ==
Single season

- Goals: Jeff Hamilton, 43, (2003–04)
- Assists: Chris Terry, 51, (2022–23)
- Points: Chris Terry, 78, (2022–23)
- Penalty minutes: Eric Godard, 295, (2004–05)
- GAA: Wade Dubielewicz, 1.38, (2003–04) (Note: AHL record)
- SV%: Wade Dubielewicz, .946, (2003–04)

Career

- Career goals: Jeff Hamilton, 89
- Career assists: Chris Terry, 129
- Career points: Chris Terry, 205
- Career penalty minutes: Brett Gallant, 857
- Career goaltending wins: Wade Dubielewicz, 81
- Career shutouts: Wade Dubielewicz, 15
- Career games: Seth Helgeson, 454

=== American Hockey League Hall of Famers ===
AHL Hall of Fame Honored Members
Name	Seasons	Induction Year
Chris Bourque	2018-19 (player)	2026
