= 2004 Calder Cup playoffs =

North American ice hockey tournament

Tournament details
- Dates: April 14 – June 6, 2004
- Teams: 16

Final positions
- Champions: Milwaukee Admirals
- Runners-up: Wilkes-Barre/Scranton Penguins

The 2004 Calder Cup playoffs of the American Hockey League began on April 14, 2004. Twenty teams, the top five from each division, qualified for the playoffs. The fourth- and fifth-placed teams in each division played best-of-3 series in the qualifying round. The four winners, in addition to the other twelve teams that qualified, played best-of-7 series for division semifinals, finals and conference finals. The conference champions played a best-of-7 series for the Calder Cup. The Calder Cup Final ended on June 6, 2004 with the Milwaukee Admirals defeating the Wilkes-Barre/Scranton Penguins four games to none to win the first Calder Cup in team history. Milwaukee's Wade Flaherty won the Jack A. Butterfield Trophy as AHL playoff MVP.

== Records ==
Several league records were set during the 2004 Calder Cup Playoffs.

- A total of 93 games were played throughout the playoffs, the most of any Calder Cup Playoffs
- Wilkes-Barre/Scranton lost 12 times during the 2004 playoffs, the most games lost in a single playoff
- Wilkes-Barre/Scranton also played in a record 11 overtime games in one playoff
- There were 17 shutouts overall, the most in any single playoff
- 27 overtime games were played, the most in a single playoff
- Milwaukee tied a record by recording six overtime victories in one playoff
- Wade Flaherty became the first goaltender to win 16 games in a single playoff

== Playoff seeds ==
After the 2003–04 AHL regular season, 20 teams qualified for the playoffs. The top five teams from each division qualified for the playoffs. The Milwaukee Admirals were the Western Conference regular season champions as well as the Macgregor Kilpatrick Trophy winners with the best overall regular season record. The Hartford Wolf Pack were the Eastern Conference regular season champions.

=== Eastern Conference ===
==== Atlantic Division ====
1. Hartford Wolf Pack – Eastern Conference regular season champions, 102 points
2. Manchester Monarchs – 92 points
3. Worcester IceCats – 90 points
4. Providence Bruins – 87 points
5. Portland Pirates – 85 points

==== East Division ====
1. Philadelphia Phantoms – 101 points
2. Bridgeport Sound Tigers – 98 points
3. Wilkes-Barre/Scranton Penguins – 86 points
4. Binghamton Senators – 80 points
5. Norfolk Admirals – 79 points

=== Western Conference ===
==== North Division ====
1. Hamilton Bulldogs – 96 points
2. Syracuse Crunch – 93 points
3. Rochester Americans – 89 points
4. Cleveland Barons – 89 points
5. Toronto Roadrunners – 81 points

==== West Division ====
1. Milwaukee Admirals – Western Conference regular season champions; Macgregor Kilpatrick Trophy winners, 102 points
2. Chicago Wolves – 96 points
3. Grand Rapids Griffins – 96 points
4. Houston Aeros – 74 points
5. Cincinnati Mighty Ducks – 72 points

== Bracket ==
Qualifier
A4	Providence	0
A5	Portland	2
E4	Binghamton	0
E5	Norfolk	2
N4	Cleveland	2
N5	Toronto	1
W4	Houston	0
W5	Cincinnati	2

Division Semifinals
A1	Hartford	4
A5	Portland	1
Atlantic Division
A3	Worcester	4
A2	Manchester	2
E1	Philadelphia	4
E5	Norfolk	2
East Division
E3	Wilkes-Barre/Scranton	4
E2	Bridgeport Sound	3
N1	Hamilton	4
N4	Cleveland	2
North Division
N3	Rochester	4
N2	Syracuse Crunch	3
W1	Milwaukee	4
W5	Cincinnati	3
West Division
W3	Chicago	4
W2	Grand Rapids	0

Division Finals
A1	Hartford	4
A3	Worcester	0
Eastern Conference
E1	Philadelphia	2
E3	Wilkes-Barre/Scranton	4
N1	Hamilton	0
N3	Rochester	4
Western Conference
W1	Milwaukee	4
W3	Chicago	2

Conference Finals
A1	Hartford	3
E3	Wilkes-Barre/Scranton	4
N3	Rochester	1
W1	Milwaukee	4

Calder Cup Final
E3	Wilkes-Barre/Scranton	0
W1	Milwaukee	4

In the qualification round all games are played at the arena of the fourth seed. In each round after the Qualification Round, the higher seed receives home ice advantage, meaning they can play a maximum of four home games if the series reaches seven games. There is no set series format for each series after the Qualification Round due to arena scheduling conflicts and travel considerations.

== Division Qualifiers ==
Note 1: All times are in Eastern Time (UTC−4).
Note 2: Game times in italics signify games to be played only if necessary.
Note 3: Home team is listed first.

=== Eastern Conference ===
==== Atlantic Division ====
===== (A4) Providence Bruins vs. (A5) Portland Pirates =====
April 15	Providence Bruins	1 – 7	Portland Pirates	Dunkin' Donuts Center

April 16	Providence Bruins	2 – 6	Portland Pirates	Dunkin' Donuts Center

Portland won series 2 – 0

==== East Division ====
===== (E4) Binghamton Senators vs. (E5) Norfolk Admirals =====
April 14	Binghamton Senators	0 – 3	Norfolk Admirals	Broome County Veterans Memorial Arena

April 16	Binghamton Senators	0 – 3	Norfolk Admirals	Broome County Veterans Memorial Arena

Norfolk won series 2 – 0

=== Western Conference ===
==== North Division ====
===== (N4) Cleveland Barons vs. (N5) Toronto Roadrunners =====
April 15	Cleveland Barons	1 – 3	Toronto Roadrunners	at Strongsville, Ohio

April 17	Cleveland Barons	2 – 1	2OT	Toronto Roadrunners	at Strongsville, Ohio

April 18	Cleveland Barons	6 – 3	Toronto Roadrunners	at Strongsville, Ohio

Cleveland won series 2 – 1

==== West Division ====
===== (W4) Houston Aeros vs. (W5) Cincinnati Mighty Ducks =====
April 15	Cincinnati Mighty Ducks	3 – 1	Houston Aeros	Toyota Center

April 17	Cincinnati Mighty Ducks	6 – 3	Houston Aeros	Toyota Center

Cincinnati won series 2 – 0

== Division Semifinals ==
=== Eastern Conference ===
==== Atlantic Division ====
===== (A1) Hartford Wolf Pack vs. (A5) Portland Pirates =====
April 20	Hartford Wolf Pack	1 – 3	Portland Pirates	Hartford Civic Center

April 21	Hartford Wolf Pack	1 – 0	Portland Pirates	Hartford Civic Center

April 23	Portland Pirates	1 – 2	2OT	Hartford Wolf Pack	Cumberland County Civic Center

April 25	Portland Pirates	3 – 5	Hartford Wolf Pack	Cumberland County Civic Center

April 28	Hartford Wolf Pack	4 – 0	Portland Pirates	Hartford Civic Center

Hartford won series 4 – 1

===== (A2) Manchester Monarchs vs. (A3) Worcester IceCats =====
April 15	Manchester Monarchs	1 – 2	Worcester IceCats	Verizon Wireless Arena

April 17	Manchester Monarchs	2 – 3	OT	Worcester IceCats	Verizon Wireless Arena

April 18	Worcester IceCats	0 – 2	Manchester Monarchs	DCU Center

April 20	Worcester IceCats	0 – 6	Manchester Monarchs	DCU Center

April 22	Manchester Monarchs	2 – 3	3OT	Worcester IceCats	Verizon Wireless Arena

April 24	Worcester IceCats	6 – 1	Manchester Monarchs	DCU Center

Worcester won series 4 – 2

==== East Division ====
===== (E1) Philadelphia Phantoms vs. (E5) Norfolk Admirals =====
April 21	Philadelphia Phantoms	2 – 1	Norfolk Admirals	Wachovia Center

April 23	Philadelphia Phantoms	1 – 2	OT	Norfolk Admirals	Wachovia Center

April 27	Norfolk Admirals	1 – 3	Philadelphia Phantoms	Norfolk Scope

April 28	Norfolk Admirals	1 – 2	3OT	Philadelphia Phantoms	Norfolk Scope

April 30	Norfolk Admirals	2 – 1	Philadelphia Phantoms	Norfolk Scope

May 1	Philadelphia Phantoms	3 – 2	Norfolk Admirals	Wachovia Center

Philadelphia won series 4 – 2

===== (E2) Bridgeport Sound Tigers vs. (E3) Wilkes-Barre/Scranton Penguins =====
April 15	Bridgeport Sound Tigers	5 – 4	OT	Wilkes-Barre/Scranton Penguins	Arena at Harbor Yard

April 17	Bridgeport Sound Tigers	5 – 4	OT	Wilkes-Barre/Scranton Penguins	Arena at Harbor Yard

April 18	Wilkes-Barre/Scranton Penguins	3 – 2	OT	Bridgeport Sound Tigers	Wachovia Arena at Casey Plaza

April 20	Wilkes-Barre/Scranton Penguins	2 – 4	Bridgeport Sound Tigers	Wachovia Arena at Casey Plaza

April 22	Bridgeport Sound Tigers	1 – 2	OT	Wilkes-Barre/Scranton Penguins	Arena at Harbor Yard

April 23	Wilkes-Barre/Scranton Penguins	5 – 0	Bridgeport Sound Tigers	Wachovia Arena at Casey Plaza

April 25	Bridgeport Sound Tigers	2 – 3	OT	Wilkes-Barre/Scranton Penguins	Arena at Harbor Yard

Wilkes-Barre/Scranton won series 4 – 3

=== Western Conference ===
==== North Division ====
===== (N1) Hamilton Bulldogs vs. (N4) Cleveland Barons =====
April 20	Hamilton Bulldogs	4 – 0	Cleveland Barons	Copps Coliseum

April 25	Hamilton Bulldogs	3 – 4	OT	Cleveland Barons	Copps Coliseum

April 27	Cleveland Barons	3 – 5	Hamilton Bulldogs	Quicken Loans Arena

April 29	Cleveland Barons	3 – 4	Hamilton Bulldogs	Quicken Loans Arena

April 30	Hamilton Bulldogs	1 – 4	Cleveland Barons	Copps Coliseum

May 2	Cleveland Barons	1 – 3	Hamilton Bulldogs	Quicken Loans Arena

Hamilton won series 4 – 2

===== (N2) Syracuse Crunch vs. (N3) Rochester Americans =====
April 16	Syracuse Crunch	3 – 2	Rochester Americans	War Memorial at Oncenter

April 17	Syracuse Crunch	0 – 6	Rochester Americans	War Memorial at Oncenter

April 21	Rochester Americans	2 – 3	Syracuse Crunch	Blue Cross Arena at the War Memorial

April 23	Rochester Americans	2 – 3	Syracuse Crunch	Blue Cross Arena at the War Memorial

April 25	Syracuse Crunch	0 – 6	Rochester Americans	War Memorial at Oncenter

April 28	Rochester Americans	7 – 5	Syracuse Crunch	Blue Cross Arena at the War Memorial

May 1	Syracuse Crunch	3 – 4	OT	Rochester Americans	War Memorial at Oncenter

Rochester won series 4 – 3

==== West Division ====
===== (W1) Milwaukee Admirals vs. (W5) Cincinnati Mighty Ducks =====
April 21	Milwaukee Admirals	4 – 5	OT	Cincinnati Mighty Ducks	Bradley Center

April 23	Milwaukee Admirals	6 – 0	Cincinnati Mighty Ducks	Bradley Center

April 24	Cincinnati Mighty Ducks	1 – 0	Milwaukee Admirals	Cincinnati Gardens

April 26	Cincinnati Mighty Ducks	3 – 4	OT	Milwaukee Admirals	Cincinnati Gardens

April 28	Cincinnati Mighty Ducks	3 – 1	Milwaukee Admirals	Cincinnati Gardens

April 30	Milwaukee Admirals	6 – 3	Cincinnati Mighty Ducks	Bradley Center

May 1	Milwaukee Admirals	5 – 1	Cincinnati Mighty Ducks	Bradley Center

Milwaukee won series 4 – 3

===== (W2) Grand Rapids Griffins vs. (W3) Chicago Wolves =====
April 16	Grand Rapids Griffins	3 – 4	OT	Chicago Wolves	Van Andel Arena

April 18	Grand Rapids Griffins	0 – 1	Chicago Wolves	Van Andel Arena

April 21	Chicago Wolves	4 – 1	Grand Rapids Griffins	Allstate Arena

April 23	Chicago Wolves	8 – 2	Grand Rapids Griffins	Allstate Arena

Chicago won series 4 – 0

== Division Finals ==
=== Eastern Conference ===
==== Atlantic Division ====
===== (A1) Hartford Wolf Pack vs. (A3) Worcester IceCats =====
April 30	Hartford Wolf Pack	3 – 1	Worcester IceCats	Hartford Civic Center

May 1	Worcester IceCats	0 – 3	Hartford Wolf Pack	DCU Center

May 2	Worcester IceCats	3 – 4	OT	Hartford Wolf Pack	DCU Center

May 5	Hartford Wolf Pack	4 – 3	3OT	Worcester IceCats	Hartford Civic Center

Hartford won series 4 – 0

==== East Division ====
===== (E1) Philadelphia Phantoms vs. (E3) Wilkes-Barre/Scranton Penguins =====
May 5	Philadelphia Phantoms	4 – 5	Wilkes-Barre/Scranton Penguins	Wachovia Center

May 7	Philadelphia Phantoms	3 – 2	OT	Wilkes-Barre/Scranton Penguins	Wachovia Center

May 8	Wilkes-Barre/Scranton Penguins	3 – 0	Philadelphia Phantoms	Wachovia Arena at Casey Plaza

May 10	Wilkes-Barre/Scranton Penguins	2 – 0	Philadelphia Phantoms	Wachovia Arena at Casey Plaza

May 12	Philadelphia Phantoms	4 – 2	Wilkes-Barre/Scranton Penguins	Wachovia Center

May 14	Wilkes-Barre/Scranton Penguins	3 – 1	Philadelphia Phantoms	Wachovia Arena at Casey Plaza

Wilkes-Barre/Scranton won series 4 – 2

=== Western Conference ===
==== North Division ====
===== (N1) Hamilton Bulldogs vs. (N3) Rochester Americans =====
May 5	Hamilton Bulldogs	0 – 2	Rochester Americans	Copps Coliseum

May 6	Hamilton Bulldogs	1 – 4	Rochester Americans	Copps Coliseum

May 8	Rochester Americans	5 – 1	Hamilton Bulldogs	Blue Cross Arena at the War Memorial

May 9	Rochester Americans	3 – 1	Hamilton Bulldogs	Blue Cross Arena at the War Memorial

Rochester won series 4 – 0

==== West Division ====
===== (W1) Milwaukee Admirals vs. (W3) Chicago Wolves =====
May 5	Milwaukee Admirals	2 – 1	2OT	Chicago Wolves	Bradley Center

May 7	Milwaukee Admirals	5 – 3	Chicago Wolves	Bradley Center

May 8	Chicago Wolves	3 – 1	Milwaukee Admirals	Allstate Arena

May 10	Chicago Wolves	2 – 5	Milwaukee Admirals	Allstate Arena

May 12	Milwaukee Admirals	1 – 2	Chicago Wolves	Bradley Center

May 14	Chicago Wolves	3 – 4	2OT	Milwaukee Admirals	Allstate Arena

Milwaukee won series 4 – 2

== Conference finals ==
=== Eastern Conference ===
==== (A1) Hartford Wolf Pack vs. (E3) Wilkes-Barre/Scranton Penguins ====
May 18	Wilkes-Barre/Scranton Penguins	3 – 1	Hartford Wolf Pack	Wachovia Arena at Casey Plaza

May 20	Wilkes-Barre/Scranton Penguins	2 – 3	OT	Hartford Wolf Pack	Wachovia Arena at Casey Plaza

May 22	Hartford Wolf Pack	3 – 2	Wilkes-Barre/Scranton Penguins	Hartford Civic Center

May 23	Hartford Wolf Pack	4 – 5	Wilkes-Barre/Scranton Penguins	Hartford Civic Center

May 25	Hartford Wolf Pack	3 – 4	OT	Wilkes-Barre/Scranton Penguins	Hartford Civic Center

May 28	Wilkes-Barre/Scranton Penguins	1 – 4	Hartford Wolf Pack	Wachovia Arena at Casey Plaza

May 29	Hartford Wolf Pack	1 – 2	OT	Wilkes-Barre/Scranton Penguins	Hartford Civic Center

Wilkes-Barre/Scranton won series 4 – 3

=== Western Conference ===
==== (W1) Milwaukee Admirals vs. (N3) Rochester Americans ====
May 18	Milwaukee Admirals	2 – 1	Rochester Americans	Bradley Center

May 20	Milwaukee Admirals	1 – 4	Rochester Americans	Bradley Center

May 22	Rochester Americans	1 – 2^{1}	OT	Milwaukee Admirals

May 23	Rochester Americans	2 – 3^{1}	Milwaukee Admirals

May 26	Rochester Americans	1 – 4^{2}	Milwaukee Admirals

Milwaukee won series 4 – 1

^{1} – Game played at HSBC Arena – Buffalo, NY
^{2} – Game played at Blue Cross Arena at the War Memorial – Rochester, New York

== Calder Cup Final ==
=== (W1) Milwaukee Admirals vs. (E3) Wilkes-Barre/Scranton Penguins ===
June 1	Milwaukee Admirals	2 – 1	OT	Wilkes-Barre/Scranton Penguins	Bradley Center

June 2	Milwaukee Admirals	8 – 4	Wilkes-Barre/Scranton Penguins	Bradley Center

June 4	Wilkes-Barre/Scranton Penguins	1 – 2	OT	Milwaukee Admirals	Wachovia Arena at Casey Plaza

June 6	Wilkes-Barre/Scranton Penguins	2 – 7	Milwaukee Admirals	Wachovia Arena at Casey Plaza

Milwaukee won series 4 – 0

== See also ==
- 2003–04 AHL season
- List of AHL seasons

Preceded by 2003 Calder Cup playoffs	Calder Cup playoffs 2004	Succeeded by 2005 Calder Cup playoffs
