= 2003 Calder Cup playoffs =

North American ice hockey tournament

Tournament details
- Dates: April 9 – June 12, 2003
- Teams: 16

Final positions
- Champions: Houston Aeros
- Runners-up: Hamilton Bulldogs

The 2003 Calder Cup playoffs of the American Hockey League began on April 9, 2003. Twenty teams, the top ten from each conference, qualified for the playoffs. The seventh-, eighth-, ninth-, and tenth-placed teams in each conference played best-of-three series in the qualifying round. The four winners, in addition to the other twelve teams that qualified, played best-of-five series for conference quarterfinals. The remaining 8 teams played best-of-seven series for conference semifinals and conference finals. The conference champions played a best-of-seven series for the Calder Cup. The Calder Cup Final ended on June 12, 2003 with the Houston Aeros defeating the Hamilton Bulldogs four games to three to win the first Calder Cup in team history.

Houston's Johan Holmqvist won the Jack A. Butterfield Trophy as AHL playoff MVP and also set a record for most minutes played by a goaltender in a single playoff with 1498. Jarret Stoll of the Hamilton Bulldogs set an AHL playoff record for the fastest goal from the start of a period by scoring 4 seconds into the 3rd period on May 22, 2003 against Binghamton. Hamilton's Michael Ryder ended the longest game in AHL history when he scored at 14:56 of the fourth overtime in Game 2 of the Calder Cup Final. However, this record was eclipsed during the 2008 Calder Cup Playoffs.

== Playoff seeds ==
After the 2002–03 AHL regular season, 20 teams qualified for the playoffs. The top ten teams from each conference qualified for the playoffs. The Hamilton Bulldogs were the Eastern Conference regular season champions as well as the Macgregor Kilpatrick Trophy winners with the best overall regular season record. The Grand Rapids Griffins were the Western Conference regular season champions. Division champions were automatically ranked 1-3.

=== Eastern Conference ===
1. Hamilton Bulldogs – Canadian Division and Eastern Conference regular season champions; Macgregor Kilpatrick Trophy winners, 110 points
2. Providence Bruins – North Division champions, 104 points
3. Binghamton Senators – East Division champions, 97 points
4. Manchester Monarchs – 97 points
5. Bridgeport Sound Tigers – 94 points
6. Worcester IceCats – 88 points
7. Hartford Wolf Pack – 86 points
8. Portland Pirates – 85 points
9. Manitoba Moose – 84 points
10. Springfield Falcons – 76 points

=== Western Conference ===
1. Grand Rapids Griffins – Central Division and Western Conference regular season champions, 106 points
2. Houston Aeros – West Division champions, 104 points
3. Norfolk Admirals – South Division champions, 91 points
4. Chicago Wolves – 98 points
5. Hershey Bears – 89 points
6. San Antonio Rampage – 87 points
7. Milwaukee Admirals – 85 points
8. Wilkes-Barre/Scranton Penguins – 84 points
9. Utah Grizzlies – 83 points
10. Rochester Americans – 81 points

== Bracket ==
Conference Qualifiers
7	Hartford Wolf Pack	0
10	Springfield Falcons	2
8	Portland Pirates	1
9	Manitoba Moose	2
7	Milwaukee Admirals	2
10	Rochester Americans	1
8	Wilkes-Barre/Scranton Penguins	2
9	Utah Grizzlies	0

Conference Quarterfinals
1	Hamilton	3
10	Springfield	1
2	Providence	1
9	Manitoba	3
Eastern Conference
3	Binghamton	3
6	Worcester	0
4	Manchester	0
5	Bridgeport	3
1	Grand Rapids	3
8	Wilkes-Barre/Scranton	1
2	Houston	3
7	Milwaukee	0
Western Conference
3	Norfolk	3
6	San Antonio	0
4	Chicago	3
5	Hershey	2

Conference Semifinals
1	Hamilton	4
9	Manitoba	3
3	Binghamton	4
5	Bridgeport	2
1	Grand Rapids	4
4	Chicago	0
2	Houston	4
3	Norfolk	2

Conference Finals
1	Hamilton	4
3	Binghamton	1
1	Grand Rapids	3
2	Houston	4

Calder Cup Final
E1	Hamilton	3
W2	Houston	4

The top 6 teams in each conference receive byes to the Conference Quarterfinals. In each round, the highest remaining seed in each conference is matched against the lowest remaining seed. In the qualification round, all games are played at the arena of the higher seed. In each round the higher seed receives home ice advantage, meaning they receive the "extra" game on home-ice if the series reaches the maximum number of games. There is no set series format for each series after the Qualification Round due to arena scheduling conflicts and travel considerations.

== Conference Qualifiers ==
Note 1: All times are in Eastern Time (UTC−4).
Note 2: Game times in italics signify games to be played only if necessary.
Note 3: Home team is listed first.

=== Eastern Conference ===
==== (7) Hartford Wolf Pack vs. (10) Springfield Falcons ====
April 9	Hartford Wolf Pack	1 – 3	Springfield Falcons	Hartford Civic Center

April 11	Hartford Wolf Pack	2 – 3	Springfield Falcons	Hartford Civic Center

Springfield won series 2 – 0

==== (8) Portland Pirates vs. (9) Manitoba Moose ====
April 10	Portland Pirates	1 – 4	Manitoba Moose	Cumberland County Civic Center

April 11	Portland Pirates	4 – 2	Manitoba Moose	Cumberland County Civic Center

April 13	Portland Pirates	3 – 6	Manitoba Moose	Cumberland County Civic Center

Manitoba won series 2 – 1

=== Western Conference ===
==== (7) Milwaukee Admirals vs. (10) Rochester Americans ====
April 10	Milwaukee Admirals	4 – 3	OT	Rochester Americans	Bradley Center

April 12	Milwaukee Admirals	1 – 6	Rochester Americans	Bradley Center

April 13	Milwaukee Admirals	6 – 1	Rochester Americans	Bradley Center

Milwaukee won series 2 – 1

==== (8) Wilkes-Barre/Scranton Penguins vs. (9) Utah Grizzlies ====
April 10	Wilkes-Barre/Scranton Penguins	5 – 2	Utah Grizzlies	Wachovia Arena at Casey Plaza

April 12	Wilkes-Barre/Scranton Penguins	2 – 1	Utah Grizzlies	Wachovia Arena at Casey Plaza

Wilkes-Barre/Scranton won series 2 – 0

== Conference Quarterfinals ==
=== Eastern Conference ===
==== (1) Hamilton Bulldogs vs. (10) Springfield Falcons ====
April 15	Hamilton Bulldogs	4 – 0	Springfield Falcons	Copps Coliseum

April 17	Hamilton Bulldogs	7 – 6	OT	Springfield Falcons	Copps Coliseum

April 18	Springfield Falcons	3 – 0	Hamilton Bulldogs	Springfield Civic Center

April 21	Springfield Falcons	1 – 2	Hamilton Bulldogs	Springfield Civic Center

Hamilton won series 3 – 1

==== (2) Providence Bruins vs. (9) Manitoba Moose ====
April 16	Providence Bruins	1 – 2	2OT	Manitoba Moose	Dunkin' Donuts Center

April 18	Providence Bruins	0 – 1	Manitoba Moose	Dunkin' Donuts Center

April 20	Manitoba Moose	0 – 1	Providence Bruins	Winnipeg Arena

April 22	Manitoba Moose	3 – 2	Providence Bruins	Winnipeg Arena

Manitoba won series 3 – 1

==== (3) Binghamton Senators vs. (6) Worcester IceCats ====
April 10	Binghamton Senators	3 – 2	OT	Worcester IceCats	Broome County Veterans Memorial Arena

April 11	Binghamton Senators	4 – 2	Worcester IceCats	Broome County Veterans Memorial Arena

April 18	Worcester IceCats	0 – 1	Binghamton Senators	Worcester's Centrum Centre

Binghamton won series 3 – 0

==== (4) Manchester Monarchs vs. (5) Bridgeport Sound Tigers ====
April 12	Manchester Monarchs	1 – 2	Bridgeport Sound Tigers	Verizon Wireless Arena

April 13	Manchester Monarchs	3 – 6	Bridgeport Sound Tigers	Verizon Wireless Arena

April 18	Bridgeport Sound Tigers	6 – 3	Manchester Monarchs	Arena at Harbor Yard

Bridgeport won series 3 – 0

=== Western Conference ===
==== (1) Grand Rapids Griffins vs. (8) Wilkes-Barre/Scranton Penguins ====
April 16	Grand Rapids Griffins	3 – 1	Wilkes-Barre/Scranton Penguins	Van Andel Arena

April 18	Grand Rapids Griffins	2 – 1	Wilkes-Barre/Scranton Penguins	Van Andel Arena

April 19	Wilkes-Barre/Scranton Penguins	6 – 2	Grand Rapids Griffins	Wachovia Arena at Casey Plaza

April 21	Wilkes-Barre/Scranton Penguins	2 – 3	Grand Rapids Griffins	Wachovia Arena at Casey Plaza

Grand Rapids won series 3 – 1

==== (2) Houston Aeros vs. (7) Milwaukee Admirals ====
April 16	Houston Aeros	3 – 2	Milwaukee Admirals	Compaq Center

April 18	Houston Aeros	4 – 2	Milwaukee Admirals	Compaq Center

April 19	Milwaukee Admirals	2 – 3	Houston Aeros	Bradley Center

Houston won series 3 – 0

==== (3) Norfolk Admirals vs. (6) San Antonio Rampage ====
April 10	Norfolk Admirals	4 – 3	OT	San Antonio Rampage	Norfolk Scope

April 11	Norfolk Admirals	2 – 1	San Antonio Rampage	Norfolk Scope

April 13	San Antonio Rampage	1 – 3	Norfolk Admirals	AT&T Center

Norfolk won series 3 – 0

==== (4) Chicago Wolves vs. (5) Hershey Bears ====
April 13	Chicago Wolves	3 – 2	Hershey Bears	Allstate Arena

April 16	Chicago Wolves	3 – 5	Hershey Bears	Allstate Arena

April 19	Hershey Bears	3 – 1	Chicago Wolves	GIANT Center

April 20	Hershey Bears	0 – 6	Chicago Wolves	GIANT Center

April 22	Chicago Wolves	3 – 2	OT	Hershey Bears	Allstate Arena

Chicago won series 3 – 2

== Conference semifinals ==
=== Eastern Conference ===
==== (1) Hamilton Bulldogs vs. (9) Manitoba Moose ====
April 27	Hamilton Bulldogs	1 – 2	Manitoba Moose	Copps Coliseum

April 29	Hamilton Bulldogs	5 – 2	Manitoba Moose	Copps Coliseum

May 2	Manitoba Moose	1 – 2	2OT	Hamilton Bulldogs	Winnipeg Arena

May 4	Manitoba Moose	2 – 6	Hamilton Bulldogs	Winnipeg Arena

May 5	Manitoba Moose	3 – 1	Hamilton Bulldogs	Winnipeg Arena

May 8	Hamilton Bulldogs	3 – 4	Manitoba Moose	Copps Coliseum

May 11	Hamilton Bulldogs	3 – 2	Manitoba Moose	Copps Coliseum

Hamilton won series 4 – 3

==== (3) Binghamton Senators vs. (5) Bridgeport Sound Tigers ====
April 26	Binghamton Senators	2 – 1	OT	Bridgeport Sound Tigers	Broome County Veterans Memorial Arena

April 27	Binghamton Senators	3 – 2	Bridgeport Sound Tigers	Broome County Veterans Memorial Arena

April 30	Bridgeport Sound Tigers	5 – 0	Binghamton Senators	Arena at Harbor Yard

May 2	Bridgeport Sound Tigers	3 – 2	Binghamton Senators	Arena at Harbor Yard

May 3	Binghamton Senators	3 – 0	Bridgeport Sound Tigers	Broome County Veterans Memorial Arena

May 5	Bridgeport Sound Tigers	1 – 2	Binghamton Senators	Arena at Harbor Yard

Binghamton won series 4 – 2

=== Western Conference ===
==== (1) Grand Rapids Griffins vs. (4) Chicago Wolves ====
April 28	Grand Rapids Griffins	4 – 3	OT	Chicago Wolves	Van Andel Arena

April 29	Grand Rapids Griffins	3 – 1	Chicago Wolves	Van Andel Arena

May 1	Chicago Wolves	1 – 2	Grand Rapids Griffins	Allstate Arena

May 2	Chicago Wolves	0 – 2	Grand Rapids Griffins	Allstate Arena

Grand Rapids won series 4 – 0

==== (2) Houston Aeros vs. (3) Norfolk Admirals ====
April 26	Houston Aeros	5 – 4	2OT	Norfolk Admirals	Compaq Center

April 27	Houston Aeros	0 – 4	Norfolk Admirals	Compaq Center

April 30	Norfolk Admirals	3 – 2	Houston Aeros	Bradley Center

May 2	Norfolk Admirals	2 – 3	Houston Aeros	Bradley Center

May 4	Norfolk Admirals	1 – 4	Houston Aeros	Bradley Center

May 7	Houston Aeros	3 – 1	Norfolk Admirals	Compaq Center

Houston won series 4 – 2

== Conference finals ==
=== Eastern Conference ===
==== (1) Hamilton Bulldogs vs. (3) Binghamton Senators ====
May 13	Hamilton Bulldogs	5 – 1	Binghamton Senators	Copps Coliseum

May 15	Hamilton Bulldogs	2 – 1	Binghamton Senators	Copps Coliseum

May 19	Binghamton Senators	6 – 4	Hamilton Bulldogs	Broome County Veterans Memorial Arena

May 20	Binghamton Senators	3 – 6	Hamilton Bulldogs	Broome County Veterans Memorial Arena

May 22	Hamilton Bulldogs	8 – 3	Binghamton Senators	Copps Coliseum

Hamilton won series 4 – 1

=== Western Conference ===
==== (1) Grand Rapids Griffins vs. (2) Houston Aeros ====
May 12	Grand Rapids Griffins	2 – 3	OT	Houston Aeros	Van Andel Arena

May 14	Grand Rapids Griffins	3 – 1	Houston Aeros	Van Andel Arena

May 16	Houston Aeros	2 – 1	Grand Rapids Griffins	Compaq Center

May 17	Houston Aeros	2 – 1	Grand Rapids Griffins	Compaq Center

May 19	Houston Aeros	4 – 5	2OT	Grand Rapids Griffins	Compaq Center

May 21	Grand Rapids Griffins	2 – 1	OT	Houston Aeros	Van Andel Arena

May 22	Grand Rapids Griffins	1 – 2	Houston Aeros	Van Andel Arena

Houston won series 4 – 3

== Calder Cup Final ==
=== (E1) Hamilton Bulldogs vs. (W2) Houston Aeros ===
May 28	Hamilton Bulldogs	1 – 2	Houston Aeros	Copps Coliseum

May 30	Hamilton Bulldogs	2 – 1	4OT	Houston Aeros	Copps Coliseum

June 4	Houston Aeros	2 – 4	Hamilton Bulldogs	Compaq Center

June 6	Houston Aeros	3 – 2	OT	Hamilton Bulldogs	Compaq Center

June 7	Houston Aeros	6 – 4	Hamilton Bulldogs	Compaq Center

June 9	Hamilton Bulldogs	2 – 1	Houston Aeros	Copps Coliseum

June 12	Hamilton Bulldogs	0 – 3	Houston Aeros	Copps Coliseum

Houston won series 4 – 3

== See also ==
- 2002–03 AHL season
- List of AHL seasons

Preceded by 2002 Calder Cup playoffs	Calder Cup playoffs 2003	Succeeded by 2004 Calder Cup playoffs
