= 1995 Calder Cup playoffs =

North American ice hockey tournament

Tournament details
- Dates: April 12 – May 26, 1995
- Teams: 12

Final positions
- Champions: Albany River Rats
- Runners-up: Fredericton Canadiens

The 1995 Calder Cup Playoffs of the American Hockey League began on April 12, 1995. The twelve teams that qualified, four from each division, played best-of-7 series for division semifinals and division finals. The highest remaining seed received a bye for the third round while the other two remaining teams played a best-of-3 series, with the winner advancing to play the bye-team in a best-of-7 series for the Calder Cup. The Calder Cup Final ended on May 26, 1995, with the Albany River Rats defeating the Fredericton Canadiens four games to zero to win the first Calder Cup in team history. Albany's Corey Schwab and Mike Dunham were co-winners of the Jack A. Butterfield Trophy as AHL playoff co-MVPs. Coincidentally, the River Rats parent club, the New Jersey Devils won the Stanley Cup in a four-game sweep over the Detroit Red Wings, making them the second pair of teams in history to win both the AHL's Calder Cup and NHL's Stanley Cup in the same season.

The Southern Division semifinal between Cornwall and Hershey was a penalty filled series. The two teams combined for 575 penalty minutes in the series, an AHL record. Hershey's 323 penalty minutes in that series set another AHL playoff record for most penalty minutes by one team in one series. Furthermore, Hershey set yet another AHL playoff record by accumulating 186 penalty minutes in game 5 of the series, the most by one team in one playoff game.

== Playoff seeds ==
After the 1994-95 AHL regular season, 12 teams qualified for the playoffs. The top four teams from each division qualified for the playoffs. The Albany River Rats finished the regular season with the best overall record.

=== Atlantic Division ===
1. Prince Edward Island Senators - 90 points
2. St. John's Maple Leafs - 76 points
3. Fredericton Canadiens - 75 points
4. Saint John Flames - 67 points

=== Northern Division ===
1. Albany River Rats - 109 points
2. Portland Pirates - 104 points
3. Providence Bruins - 89 points
4. Adirondack Red Wings - 74 points

=== Southern Division ===
1. Binghamton Rangers - 93 points
2. Cornwall Aces - 85 points
3. Hershey Bears - 78 points
4. Rochester Americans - 77 points

== Bracket ==
Division semifinals
A1 | P.E.I. | 4
A4 | Saint John | 1
Atlantic Division
A2 | St. John's | 1
A3 | Fredericton | 4
N1 | Albany | 4
N4 | Adirondack | 0
Northern Division
N2 | Portland | 3
N3 | Providence | 4
S1 | Binghamton | 4
S4 | Rochester | 1
Southern Division
S2 | Cornwall | 4
S3 | Hershey | 2

Division finals
A1 | P.E.I. | 2
A3 | Fredericton | 4
N1 | Albany | 4
N3 | Providence | 2
S1 | Binghamton | 2
S2 | Cornwall | 4

Semifinals
S2 | Cornwall | 0
A3 | Fredericton | 2

Final
N1 | Albany | 4
A3 | Fredericton | 0

In each round the team that earned more points during the regular season receives home ice advantage, meaning they receive the "extra" game on home-ice if the series reaches the maximum number of games. For the Calder Cup Semifinal round, the team that earned the most points during the regular season out of the three remaining teams receives a bye directly to the Calder Cup Final. There is no set series format due to arena scheduling conflicts and travel considerations.

== Division Semifinals ==
Note 1: Home team is listed first.
Note 2: The number of overtime periods played (where applicable) is not specified

=== Atlantic Division ===
==== (A1) Prince Edward Island Senators vs. (A4) Saint John Flames ====
| April 13 | Prince Edward Island Senators | 5 - 2 | Saint John Flames |

| April 15 | Prince Edward Island Senators | 6 - 4 | Saint John Flames |

| April 17 | Saint John Flames | 3 - 1 | Prince Edward Island Senators |

| April 19 | Saint John Flames | 0 - 2 | Prince Edward Island Senators |

| April 21 | Prince Edward Island Senators | 1 - 0 | Saint John Flames |

| Prince Edward Island won series 4 – 1 |

==== (A2) St. John's Maple Leafs vs. (A3) Fredericton Canadiens ====
| April 13 | St. John's Maple Leafs | 2 - 4 | Fredericton Canadiens |

| April 15 | St. John's Maple Leafs | 4 - 1 | Fredericton Canadiens |

| April 17 | Fredericton Canadiens | 3 - 1 | St. John's Maple Leafs |

| April 19 | Fredericton Canadiens | 5 - 3 | St. John's Maple Leafs |

| April 20 | Fredericton Canadiens | 2 - 0 | St. John's Maple Leafs |

| Fredericton won series 4 - 1 |

=== Northern Division ===
==== (N1) Albany River Rats vs. (N4) Adirondack Red Wings ====
| April 13 | Albany River Rats | 2 - 1 | Adirondack Red Wings |

| April 15 | Albany River Rats | 4 - 3 | Adirondack Red Wings |

| April 16 | Adirondack Red Wings | 2 - 4 | Albany River Rats |

| April 19 | Adirondack Red Wings | 1 - 5 | Albany River Rats |

| Albany won series 4 – 0 |

==== (N2) Portland Pirates vs. (N3) Providence Bruins ====
| April 14 | Portland Pirates | 5 - 6 | Providence Bruins |

| April 15 | Portland Pirates | 4 - 1 | Providence Bruins |

| April 19 | Providence Bruins | 7 - 3 | Portland Pirates |

| April 21 | Providence Bruins | 4 - 5 | Portland Pirates |

| April 23 | Portland Pirates | 4 - 5 | Providence Bruins |

| April 25 | Providence Bruins | 1 - 6 | Portland Pirates |

| April 26 | Portland Pirates | 3 - 6 | Providence Bruins |

| Providence won series 4 - 3 |

=== Southern Division ===
==== (S1) Binghamton Rangers vs. (S4) Rochester Americans ====
| April 12 | Binghamton Rangers | 4 - 3 | Rochester Americans |

| April 14 | Binghamton Rangers | 3 - 1 | Rochester Americans |

| April 15 | Rochester Americans | 3 - 2 | Binghamton Rangers |

| April 19 | Rochester Americans | 0 - 8 | Binghamton Rangers |

| April 21 | Binghamton Rangers | 4 - 3 | OT | Rochester Americans |

| Binghamton won series 4 - 1 |

==== (S2) Cornwall Aces vs. (S3) Hershey Bears ====
| April 13 | Cornwall Aces | 4 - 3 | Hershey Bears |

| April 15 | Cornwall Aces | 4 - 3 | Hershey Bears |

| April 18 | Hershey Bears | 2 - 3 | OT | Cornwall Aces |

| April 20 | Hershey Bears | 4 - 2 | Cornwall Aces |

| April 21 | Hershey Bears | 6 - 3 | Cornwall Aces |

| April 23 | Cornwall Aces | 2 - 1 | Hershey Bears |

| Cornwall won series 4 - 2 |

== Division Finals ==
=== Atlantic Division ===
==== (A1) Prince Edward Island Senators vs. (A3) Fredericton Canadiens ====
| April 26 | Prince Edward Island Senators | 5 - 3 | Fredericton Canadiens |

| April 28 | Prince Edward Island Senators | 3 - 7 | Fredericton Canadiens |

| April 30 | Fredericton Canadiens | 4 - 1 | Prince Edward Island Senators |

| May 2 | Fredericton Canadiens | 7 - 2 | Prince Edward Island Senators |

| May 5 | Prince Edward Island Senators | 5 - 4 | OT | Fredericton Canadiens |

| May 7 | Fredericton Canadiens | 4 - 2 | Prince Edward Island Senators |

| Fredericton won series 4 - 2 |

=== Northern Division ===
==== (N1) Albany River Rats vs. (N3) Providence Bruins ====
| April 28 | Albany River Rats | 6 - 4 | Providence Bruins |

| April 29 | Albany River Rats | 5 - 4 | OT | Providence Bruins |

| May 2 | Providence Bruins | 6 - 7 | Albany River Rats |

| May 9 | Providence Bruins | 5 - 0 | Albany River Rats |

| May 10 | Albany River Rats | 0 - 4 | Providence Bruins |

| May 13 | Providence Bruins | 3 - 6 | Albany River Rats |

| Albany won series 4 - 2 |

=== Southern Division ===
==== (S1) Binghamton Rangers vs. (S2) Cornwall Aces ====
| April 29 | Binghamton Rangers | 4 - 5 | OT | Cornwall Aces |

| May 1 | Binghamton Rangers | 4 - 2 | Cornwall Aces |

| May 3 | Cornwall Aces | 2 - 0 | Binghamton Rangers |

| May 5 | Cornwall Aces | 6 - 0 | Binghamton Rangers |

| May 7 | Binghamton Rangers | 3 - 2 | Cornwall Aces |

| May 10 | Cornwall Aces | 4 - 2 | Binghamton Rangers |

| Cornwall won series 4 - 2 |

== Semifinal ==
=== Bye ===
- (N1) Albany River Rats receive a bye to the Calder Cup Final by virtue of having earned the highest point total in the regular season out of the three remaining teams.

=== (S2) Cornwall Aces vs. (A3) Fredericton Canadiens ===
| May 14 | Fredericton Canadiens | 2 - 1 | OT | Cornwall Aces |

| May 16 | Cornwall Aces | 1 - 3 | Fredericton Canadiens |

| Fredericton won series 2 - 0 |

== Calder Cup Final ==
=== (N1) Albany River Rats vs. (A3) Fredericton Canadiens ===
| May 20 | Albany River Rats | 4 - 3 | Fredericton Canadiens |

| May 21 | Albany River Rats | 4 - 3 | Fredericton Canadiens |

| May 23 | Fredericton Canadiens | 1 - 4 | Albany River Rats |

| May 26 | Fredericton Canadiens | 0 - 3 | Albany River Rats |

| Albany won series 4 - 0 |

== See also ==
- 1994–95 AHL season
- List of AHL seasons

| Preceded by 1994 Calder Cup playoffs | Calder Cup playoffs 1995 | Succeeded by 1996 Calder Cup playoffs |
