= 2014–15 Los Angeles Kings season =

National Hockey League team season

2014–15 Los Angeles Kings
- Division: 4th Pacific
- Conference: 9th Western
- 2014–15 record: 40–27–15
- Home record: 25–9–7
- Road record: 15–18–8
- Goals for: 220
- Goals against: 205

Team information
- General manager: Dean Lombardi
- Coach: Darryl Sutter
- Captain: Dustin Brown
- Alternate captains: Matt Greene; Anze Kopitar
- Arena: Staples Center
- Average attendance: 18,265 (41 games)

Team leaders
- Goals: Jeff Carter (28)
- Assists: Anze Kopitar (48)
- Points: Anze Kopitar (64)
- Penalty minutes: Kyle Clifford (87)
- Plus/minus: Tyler Toffoli (+25)
- Wins: Jonathan Quick (36)
- Goals against average: Jonathan Quick (2.24)

The 2014–15 Los Angeles Kings season was the 48th season (47th season of play) for the National Hockey League (NHL) franchise that was established on June 5, 1967. The Kings failed to qualify for the Stanley Cup playoffs for the first time since the 2008–09 season, becoming the first team since the 2006–07 Carolina Hurricanes to fail to qualify for the playoffs after winning the Stanley Cup the previous season.

== Regular season ==
The team entered the regular season as the defending champions. Having won two Stanley Cup championships in the last three years, the Kings entered were the early favorites to retain their title. Again, however, Los Angeles' post-championship home opener was a defeat, this time a 4–0 blowout to cross-state rival San Jose Sharks. The following game was an overtime defeat to the Arizona Coyotes, followed by a home win against the Winnipeg Jets. During the season, the Kings took part in their second outdoor game, this time visiting the Sharks at Levi's Stadium for the 2015 NHL Stadium Series. The Kings struggled often during the season, with scoring slumps, defensemen losing games to injury and suspensions and frequent road losses, leading to a lackluster of play. By the end of the season, they were caught and missed the playoffs by two points.

== Standings ==
Pacific Division
Pos	Team	GP	W	L	OTL	ROW	GF	GA	GD	Pts
1	z – Anaheim Ducks	82	51	24	7	43	236	226	+10	109
2	x – Vancouver Canucks	82	48	29	5	42	242	222	+20	101
3	x – Calgary Flames	82	45	30	7	41	241	216	+25	97
4	Los Angeles Kings	82	40	27	15	38	220	205	+15	95
5	San Jose Sharks	82	40	33	9	36	228	232	−4	89
6	Edmonton Oilers	82	24	44	14	19	198	283	−85	62
7	Arizona Coyotes	82	24	50	8	19	170	272	−102	56

Source: National Hockey League
x – Clinched playoff spot; z – Clinched conference

Western Conference Wild Card
Pos	Div	Team	GP	W	L	OTL	ROW	GF	GA	GD	Pts
1	CE	x – Minnesota Wild	82	46	28	8	42	231	201	+30	100
2	CE	x – Winnipeg Jets	82	43	26	13	36	230	210	+20	99
3	PA	Los Angeles Kings	82	40	27	15	38	220	205	+15	95
4	CE	Dallas Stars	82	41	31	10	37	261	260	+1	92
5	CE	Colorado Avalanche	82	39	31	12	29	219	227	−8	90
6	PA	San Jose Sharks	82	40	33	9	36	228	232	−4	89
7	PA	Edmonton Oilers	82	24	44	14	19	198	283	−85	62
8	PA	Arizona Coyotes	82	24	50	8	19	170	272	−102	56

Source: National Hockey League
x – Clinched playoff spot

== Suspensions/fines ==
Player	Explanation	Length	Salary	Date issued
Slava Voynov	Suspended indefinitely pending a formal investigation by the National Hockey League of an arrest of charges of domestic violence.	N/A	N/A	October 20, 2014
Jordan Nolan	Boarding on Detroit Red Wings forward Darren Helm during NHL game No. 149 in Detroit on Friday, October 31, 2014, at 3:53 of the third period.	2 games	$17,073.18	November 2, 2014
Team	Violating the terms of defenseman Slava Voynov's suspension.	—	$100,000.00	December 2, 2014

== Schedule and results ==
=== Pre-season ===
Pre-season game log: 5–0–2 (Home: 2–0–1; Road: 3–0–1)
#	Date	Visitor	Score	Home	OT	Decision	Attendance	Record	Recap
1	September 22	Los Angeles	4–5	Arizona	SO	Bartosak	6,917	0–0–1	Recap
2	September 22	Arizona	3–4	Los Angeles	SO	Deslauriers	12,989	1–0–1	Recap
3	September 25	Anaheim	3–4	Los Angeles	SO	Jones	18,230	2–0–1	Recap
4	September 28	Los Angeles	4–2	Anaheim		Jones	15,321	3–0–1	Recap
5	September 30	Los Angeles	4–1	San Jose		Quick	16,251	4–0–1	Recap
6^{[a]}	October 2	Los Angeles	2–1	Colorado	SO	Jones	6,176	5–0–1	Recap
7^{[b]}	October 4	Colorado	3–2	Los Angeles	SO	Quick		5–0–2	Recap
Notes:^{a} Game was played at Broadmoor World Arena in Colorado Springs, Colorado.^{b} Game was played at MGM Grand Garden Arena in Paradise, Nevada.

=== Regular season ===
Game log

October: 6–3–2 (Home: 6–1–0; Road: 0–3-2)
#	Date	Visitor	Score	Home	OT	Decision	Attendance	Record	Pts	Recap
1	October 8	San Jose	4–0	Los Angeles		Quick	18,514	0–1–0	0	Recap
2	October 11	Los Angeles	2–3	Arizona	OT	Quick	12,859	0–1–1	1	Recap
3	October 12	Winnipeg	1–4	Los Angeles		Jones	18,230	1–1–1	3	Recap
4	October 14	Edmonton	1–6	Los Angeles		Quick	18,230	2–1–1	5	Recap
5	October 16	St. Louis	0–1	Los Angeles	SO	Quick	18,230	3–1–1	7	Recap
6	October 19	Minnesota	1–2	Los Angeles		Quick	18,230	4–1–1	9	Recap
7	October 23	Buffalo	0–2	Los Angeles		Quick	18,230	5–1–1	11	Recap
8	October 26	Columbus	2–5	Los Angeles		Quick	18,230	6–1–1	13	Recap
9	October 28	Los Angeles	2–3	Philadelphia	OT	Quick	19,873	6–1–2	14	Recap
10	October 30	Los Angeles	0–3	Pittsburgh		Jones	18,570	6–2–2	14	Recap
11	October 31	Los Angeles	2–5	Detroit		Quick	20,027	6–3–2	14	Recap

November: 6–4–3 (Home: 4–2–1; Road: 2–2–2)
#	Date	Visitor	Score	Home	OT	Decision	Attendance	Record	Pts	Recap
12	November 2	Los Angeles	2–3	Carolina		Quick	10,519	6–4–2	14	Recap
13	November 4	Los Angeles	3–1	Dallas		Quick	16,567	7–4–2	16	Recap
14	November 6	NY Islanders	2–1	Los Angeles	SO	Quick	18,230	7–4–3	17	Recap
15	November 8	Vancouver	1–5	Los Angeles		Quick	18,230	8–4–3	19	Recap
16	November 12	Los Angeles	5–6	Anaheim	SO	Quick	17,245	8–4–4	20	Recap
17	November 13	Dallas	2–0	Los Angeles		Jones	18,230	8–5–4	20	Recap
18	November 15	Anaheim	2–3	Los Angeles	OT	Quick	18,230	9–5–4	22	Recap
19	November 18	Florida	2–5	Los Angeles		Quick	18,230	10–5–4	24	Recap
20	November 20	Carolina	2–3	Los Angeles		Quick	18,230	11–5–4	26	Recap
21	November 22	Los Angeles	4–5	Dallas		Quick	18,111	11–6–4	26	Recap
22	November 25	Los Angeles	3–4	Nashville	SO	Jones	17,181	11–6–5	27	Recap
23	November 26	Los Angeles	4–0	Minnesota		Jones	19,038	12–6–5	29	Recap
24	November 29	Chicago	4–1	Los Angeles		Quick	18,471	12–7–5	29	Recap

December: 6–5–3 (Home: 4–1–1; Road: 2–4–2)
#	Date	Visitor	Score	Home	OT	Decision	Attendance	Record	Pts	Recap
25	December 2	Boston	0–2	Los Angeles		Quick	18,230	13–7–5	31	Recap
26	December 4	Los Angeles	4–0	Arizona		Jones	12,254	14–7–5	33	Recap
27	December 6	Philadelphia	2–1	Los Angeles		Quick	18,230	14–8–5	33	Recap
28	December 9	Los Angeles	0–1	Buffalo		Quick	18,438	14–9–5	33	Recap
29	December 11	Los Angeles	5–3	Ottawa		Quick	17,284	15–9–5	35	Recap
30	December 12	Los Angeles	2–6	Montreal		Jones	21,287	15–10–5	35	Recap
31	December 14	Los Angeles	3–4	Toronto	SO	Quick	19,219	15–10–6	36	Recap
32	December 16	Los Angeles	2–5	St. Louis		Quick	17,212	15–11–6	36	Recap
33	December 18	St. Louis	4–6	Los Angeles		Quick	18,230	16–11–6	38	Recap
34	December 20	Arizona	2–4	Los Angeles		Quick	18,230	17–11–6	40	Recap
35	December 22	Calgary	4–3	Los Angeles	OT	Quick	18,230	17–11–7	41	Recap
36	December 27	San Jose	1–3	Los Angeles		Quick	18,451	18–11–7	43	Recap
37	December 29	Los Angeles	1–2	Calgary		Quick	19,289	18–12–7	43	Recap
38	December 30	Los Angeles	2–3	Edmonton	SO	Quick	16,839	18–12–8	44	Recap

January: 3–4–4 (Home: 2–2–4; Road: 1–2–0)
#	Date	Visitor	Score	Home	OT	Decision	Attendance	Record	Pts	Recap
39	January 1	Los Angeles	3–2	Vancouver		Quick	18,870	19–12–8	46	Recap
40	January 3	Nashville	7–6	Los Angeles	OT	Jones	18,230	19–12–9	47	Recap
41	January 8	NY Rangers	4–3	Los Angeles		Quick	18,230	19–13–9	47	Recap
42	January 10	Winnipeg	5–4	Los Angeles	SO	Quick	18,230	19–13–10	48	Recap
43	January 12	Toronto	0–2	Los Angeles		Jones	18,230	20–13–10	50	Recap
44	January 14	New Jersey	5–3	Los Angeles		Quick	18,230	20–14–10	50	Recap
45	January 17	Anaheim	3–2	Los Angeles	SO	Quick	18,230	20–14–11	51	Recap
46	January 19	Calgary	2–1	Los Angeles	OT	Quick	18,230	20–14–12	52	Recap
47	January 21	Los Angeles	2–4	San Jose		Quick	17,562	20–15–12	52	Recap
48	January 28	Chicago	3–4	Los Angeles		Quick	18,525	21–15–12	54	Recap
49	January 31	Los Angeles	1–3	Boston		Quick	17,565	21–16–12	54	Recap

February: 8–4–0 (Home: 4–1–0; Road: 4–3–0)
#	Date	Visitor	Score	Home	OT	Decision	Attendance	Record	Pts	Recap
50	February 3	Los Angeles	0–4	Washington		Quick	18,506	21–17–12	54	Recap
51	February 5	Los Angeles	2–3	Florida		Quick	9,624	21–18–12	54	Recap
52	February 7	Los Angeles	4–2	Tampa Bay		Quick	19,204	22–18–12	56	Recap
53	February 9	Los Angeles	4–3	Columbus		Quick	14,703	23–18–12	58	Recap
54	February 12	Calgary	3–5	Los Angeles		Quick	18,230	24–18–12	60	Recap
55	February 14	Washington	1–3	Los Angeles		Quick	18,230	25–18–12	62	Recap
56	February 16	Tampa Bay	2–3	Los Angeles		Quick	18,230	26–18–12	64	Recap
57	February 18	Los Angeles	4–1	Colorado		Quick	15,786	27–18–12	66	Recap
58	February 21 (outdoor game)	Los Angeles	2–1	San Jose		Quick	70,205 (at Levi's Stadium)	28–18–12	68	Recap
59	February 24	Detroit	0–1	Los Angeles		Quick	18,203	29–18–12	70	Recap
60	February 26	Ottawa	1–0	Los Angeles		Quick	18,203	29–19–12	70	Recap
61	February 27	Los Angeles	2–4	Anaheim		Jones	17,413	29–20–12	70	Recap

March: 8–5–2 (Home: 2–2–1; Road: 6–3–1)
#	Date	Visitor	Score	Home	OT	Decision	Attendance	Record	Pts	Recap
62	March 1	Los Angeles	2–5	Winnipeg		Quick	15,016	29–21–12	70	Recap
63	March 3	Los Angeles	5–2	Edmonton		Quick	16,839	30–21–12	72	Recap
64	March 5	Montreal	3–4	Los Angeles	SO	Quick	18,230	31–21–12	74	Recap
65	March 7	Pittsburgh	1–0	Los Angeles	OT	Quick	18,487	31–21–13	75	Recap
66	March 10	Los Angeles	5–2	Colorado		Quick	15,724	32–21–13	77	Recap
67	March 12	Los Angeles	4–0	Vancouver		Quick	18,663	33–21–13	79	Recap
68	March 14	Nashville	2–1	Los Angeles		Quick	18,230	33–22–13	79	Recap
69	March 16	Arizona	0–1	Los Angeles		Quick	18,230	34–22–13	81	Recap
70	March 18	Los Angeles	2–3	Anaheim	OT	Quick	17,174	34–22–14	82	Recap
71	March 21	Vancouver	4–1	Los Angeles		Quick	18,230	34–23–14	82	Recap
72	March 23	Los Angeles	3–1	New Jersey		Quick	15,721	35–23–14	84	Recap
73	March 24	Los Angeles	4–2	NY Rangers		Quick	18,006	36–23–14	86	Recap
74	March 26	Los Angeles	3–2	NY Islanders		Quick	16,170	37–23–14	88	Recap
75	March 28	Los Angeles	1–4	Minnesota		Quick	19,204	37–24–14	88	Recap
76	March 30	Los Angeles	1–4	Chicago		Quick	21,848	37–25–14	88	Recap

April: 3–2–1 (Home: 3–0–0; Road: 0–2–1)
#	Date	Visitor	Score	Home	OT	Decision	Attendance	Record	Pts	Recap
77	April 2	Edmonton	2–8	Los Angeles		Quick	18,230	38–25–14	90	Recap
78	April 4	Colorado	1–3	Los Angeles		Quick	18,230	39–25–14	92	Recap
79	April 6	Los Angeles	1–2	Vancouver	SO	Quick	18,870	39–25–15	93	Recap
80	April 7	Los Angeles	2–4	Edmonton		Jones	16,839	39–26–15	93	Recap
81	April 9	Los Angeles	1–3	Calgary		Quick	19,289	39–27–15	93	Recap
82	April 11	San Jose	1–4	Los Angeles		Quick	18,230	40–27–15	95	Recap

Legend: Win (2 points) Loss (0 points) Overtime/shootout loss (1 point)

== Player statistics ==
Final stats

=== Skaters ===
Note: GP = Games played; G = Goals; A = Assists; Pts = Points; +/− = Plus/minus; PIM = Penalty minutes
Final Stats

Regular season
Player	GP	G	A	Pts	+/-	PIM
Anze Kopitar	79	16	48	64	−2	10
Jeff Carter	82	28	34	62	7	28
Tyler Toffoli	76	23	26	49	25	37
Marian Gaborik	69	27	20	47	7	16
Drew Doughty	82	7	39	46	3	56
Justin Williams	81	18	23	41	8	29
Jake Muzzin	76	10	31	41	−4	22
Dustin Brown	82	11	16	27	−17	26
Dwight King	81	13	13	26	−3	21
Trevor Lewis	73	9	16	25	8	14
Brayden McNabb	71	2	22	24	11	52
Alec Martinez	56	6	16	22	9	10
Jarret Stoll	73	6	11	17	3	58
Tanner Pearson	42	12	4	16	14	14
Mike Richards	53	5	11	16	−10	39
Kyle Clifford	80	6	9	15	5	87
Robyn Regehr	67	3	10	13	10	45
Jordan Nolan	60	6	3	9	−6	54
Matt Greene	82	3	6	9	1	54
Jamie McBain	26	3	6	9	4	4
Nick Shore	34	1	6	7	0	10
Andrej Sekera^{†}	16	1	3	4	4	6
Andy Andreoff	18	2	1	3	1	18
Slava Voynov	6	0	2	2	0	2
Jeff Schultz	9	0	1	1	1	4
David Van der Gulik	1	0	0	0	0	0

=== Goaltenders ===
Note: GP = Games played; GS = Games started; TOI = Time on ice; W = Wins; L = Losses; OT = Overtime losses; GA = Goals against; GAA = Goals against average; SV = Saves; SA = Shots against; SV% = Save percentage; SO = Shutouts; G = Goals; A = Assists; PIM = Penalty minutes
Final stats

Regular season
Player	GP	GS	TOI	W	L	OT	GA	GAA	SA	SV%	SO	G	A	PIM
Jonathan Quick	72	71	4184	36	22	13	156	2.24	1896	.918	6	0	1	18
Martin Jones	15	11	775	4	5	2	29	2.25	307	.906	3	0	1	0

^{†}Denotes player spent time with another team before joining the Kings. Stats reflect time with the Kings only.
^{‡}Traded mid-season. Stats reflect time with the Kings only.
Bold/italics denotes franchise record

== Notable achievements ==
=== Awards ===
Regular season
Player	Award	Awarded
J. Carter	NHL First Star of the Week	October 27, 2014
T. Pearson	NHL Rookie of the Month	November 3, 2014
A. Kopitar	NHL First Star of the Week	December 22, 2014
D. Doughty	NHL All-Star game selection	January 10, 2015
A. Kopitar	NHL All-Star game selection	January 10, 2015
T. Pearson	NHL All-Star game rookie selection	January 10, 2015
D. Doughty	NHL All-Star game assistant captain	January 14, 2015
T. Toffoli	NHL Second Star of the Week	February 16, 2015
J. Quick	NHL First Star of the Week	February 23, 2015

=== Milestones ===
Regular season
Player	Milestone	Reached
A. Andreoff	1st career NHL game	October 14, 2014
J. Quick	20,000 career NHL minutes	October 26, 2014
D. Brown	200th career NHL goal	November 26, 2014
K. Clifford	300th career NHL game	November 29, 2014
T. Toffoli	100th career NHL game	December 9, 2014
T. Lewis	300th career NHL game	December 18, 2014
J. Schultz	400th career NHL game	December 29, 2014
M. Richards	300th career NHL assist	January 1, 2015
M. Richards	700th career NHL game	January 12, 2015
D. King	200th career NHL game	January 14, 2015
N. Shore	1st career NHL game	January 17, 2015
N. Shore	1st career NHL assist 1st career NHL point	January 21, 2015
J. McBain	100th career NHL point	February 5, 2015
T. Toffoli	1st career NHL hat-trick	February 12, 2015
J. Carter	500th career NHL point	February 12, 2015
D. Doughty	500th career NHL game	February 21, 2015
J. Quick	200th career NHL win	February 21, 2015
J. McBain	300th career NHL game	February 24, 2015
J. Williams	900th career NHL game	March 5, 2015
J. Carter	700th career NHL game	March 5, 2015
B. McNabb	100th career NHL game	March 16, 2015
A. Andreoff	1st career NHL goal 1st career NHL point	March 16, 2015
A. Kopitar	600th career NHL point	March 21, 2015
J. Quick	400th career NHL game	March 26, 2015
J. Muzzin	200th career NHL game	March 26, 2015
N. Shore	1st career NHL goal	March 26, 2015

== Transactions ==
The Kings have been involved in the following transactions during the 2014–15 season:

=== Trades ===
June 28, 2014	To Vancouver Canucks Linden Vey	To Los Angeles Kings TBL's 2nd-round pick in 2014
February 25, 2015	To Carolina Hurricanes Roland McKeown conditional 1st-round pick in 2015	To Los Angeles Kings Andrej Sekera

=== Free agents acquired ===
Date	Player	Former team	Contract terms (in U.S. dollars)	Ref
July 1, 2014	Adam Cracknell	St. Louis Blues	1 year, $600,000	
July 1, 2014	David Van der Gulik	Colorado Avalanche	1 year, $550,000	

=== Free agents lost ===
Date	Player	New team	Contract terms (in U.S. dollars)	Ref
July 1, 2014	Willie Mitchell	Florida Panthers	2 years, $8.5 million	
July 1, 2014	Andrew Campbell	Arizona Coyotes	1 year, $550,000	
September 5, 2014	Colin Fraser	St. Louis Blues	1 year	

=== Claimed via waivers ===
Player	Previous team	Date

=== Lost via waivers ===
Player	New team	Date claimed off waivers
Adam Cracknell	Columbus Blue Jackets	October 7, 2014

=== Lost via retirement ===
Player

=== Player signings ===
Date	Player	Contract terms (in U.S. dollars)	Ref
June 30, 2014	Jeff Schultz	2 years, $1.7 million	
July 14, 2014	Brayden McNabb	2 years, $1.3 million	
July 14, 2014	Andy Andreoff	1 year, $550,000	
July 15, 2014	Jean-Francois Berube	2 years, $1.125 million	
July 30, 2014	Dwight King	3 years, $5.85 million	
October 5, 2014	Justin Auger	3 years, $1.85 million entry-level contract	
October 5, 2014	Zachary Leslie	3 years, $1.85 million entry-level contract	
October 15, 2014	Jake Muzzin	5 years, $20 million	
February 24, 2015	Jordan Nolan	3 years, $2.85 million contract extension	
February 25, 2015	Kyle Clifford	5 years, $8 million contract extension	
April 2, 2015	Jonny Brodzinski	2 years, entry-level contract	
April 2, 2015	Tanner Pearson	2 years, $2.8 million contract extension	
April 15, 2015	Adrian Kempe	3 years, entry-level contract	

== Draft picks ==
The 2014 NHL entry draft will be held on June 27–28, 2014, at the Wells Fargo Center in Philadelphia, Pennsylvania.

Round	#	Player	Pos	Nationality	College/junior/club team (league)
1	29	Adrian Kempe	LW	Sweden	MODO (Sweden)
2	50^{a}	Roland McKeown	D	Canada	Kingston Frontenacs (OHL)
2	60^{b}	Alex Lintuniemi	D	Finland	Ottawa 67's (OHL)
3	90	Michael Amadio	C	Canada	North Bay Battalion (OHL)
4	120	Steven Johnson	D	United States	Omaha Lancers (USHL)
5	150	Alec Dillion	G	Canada	Victoria Grizzlies (BCHL)
6	157^{c}	Jake Marchment	C	Canada	Belleville Bulls (OHL)
6	180	Matthew Mistele	LW	Canada	Plymouth Whalers (OHL)
7	209^{d}	Spencer Watson	RW	Canada	Kingston Frontenacs (OHL)
7	210	Jacob Middleton	D	Canada	Ottawa 67's (OHL)

Draft notes

- ^{[a]}The Tampa Bay Lightning's second-round pick (previously acquired by the Vancouver Canucks) went to the Los Angeles Kings as a result of a trade on June 28, 2014, that sent Linden Vey to the Canucks in exchange for this pick.
- The Los Angeles Kings' second-round pick was re-acquired as the result of a trade on March 5, 2014, that sent Hudson Fasching and Nicolas Deslauriers to Buffalo in exchange for Brayden McNabb, Jonathan Parker, Los Angeles' second-round pick in 2015 and this pick.
  Buffalo previously acquired this pick as the result of a trade on April 1, 2013, that sent Robyn Regehr to Los Angeles in exchange for a second-round pick in 2015 and this pick.
- ^{[c]}The Carolina Hurricanes' sixth-round pick went to the Los Angeles Kings as a result of a January 13, 2013, trade that sent Kevin Westgarth to the Hurricanes in exchange for Anthony Stewart, a 2013 fourth-round pick (#96–Kyle Platzer) and this pick.
- ^{[d]}The New York Rangers' seventh-round pick went to the Los Angeles Kings as a result of a January 4, 2014, trade that sent Daniel Carcillo to the Rangers in exchange for this pick.
