= Felix Mariano =

Dominican photographer (born 1977)

- Born: March 24, 1977 (age 49); Santo Domingo, Dominican Republic
- Citizenship: American
- Occupations: Designer, producer, host
- Years active: 2003-present

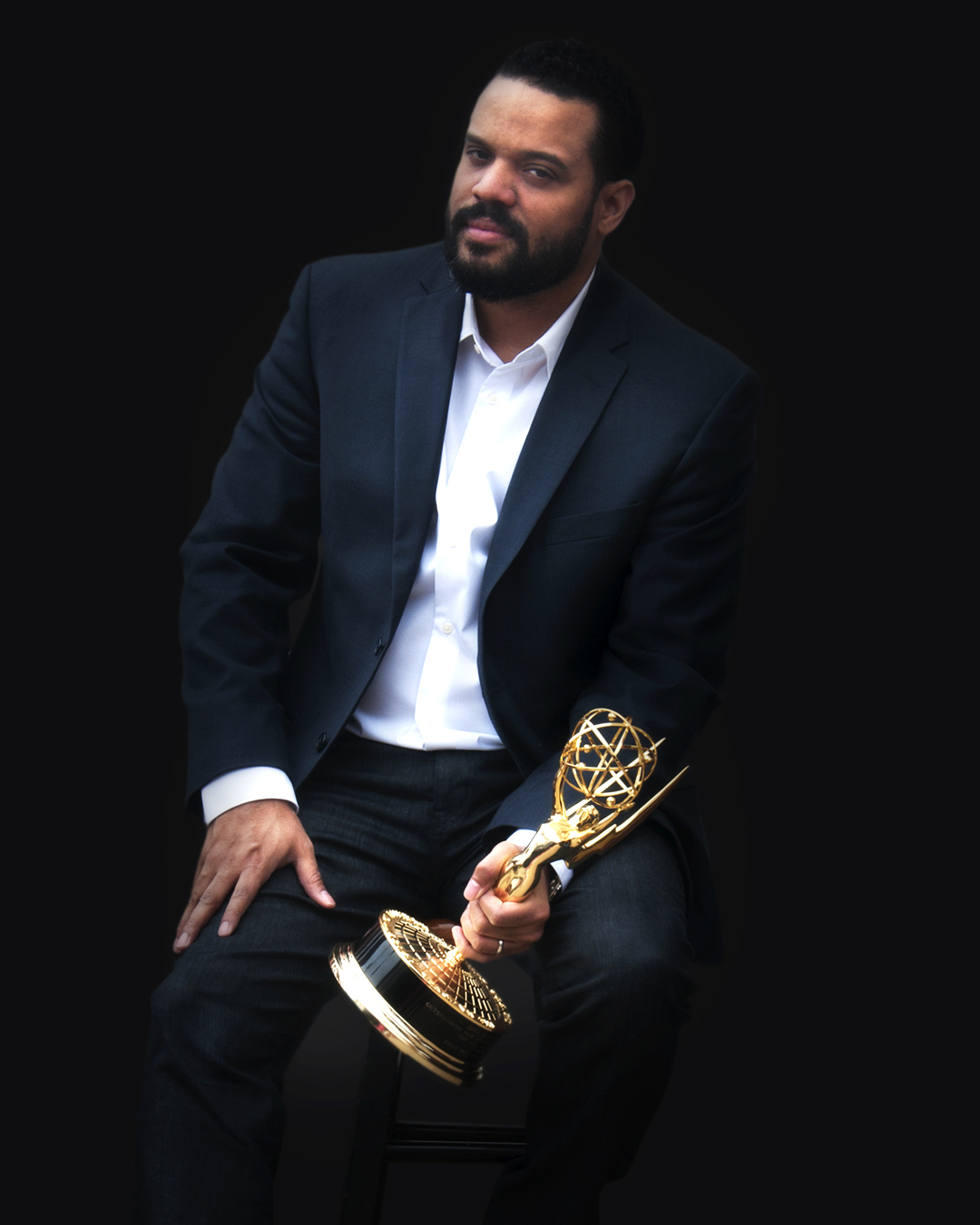
Felix Mariano and his Emmy statuette

Felix Mariano (born 24 March 1977) is a Dominican designer, photographer, producer and YouTuber. He was raised in Washington Heights in New York City. Felix is known for his design contributions in television series and specials such as NBC Sunday Night Football, NASCAR on NBC, the 2014 Stanley Cup Final, The Dan Patrick Show, World Series of Fighting 21, WWE Money in the Bank, WWE Great Balls of Fire, the Kentucky Derby, the Belmont Stakes, and Super Bowl XLIX.

== Career ==
Mariano created graphics for high-profile events and visualized ideas for companies such as Amazon, NBC Sports, Mercedes-Benz, Coca-Cola, General Electric, Chevrolet, WWE, Microsoft, the NHL, the NBA, and the NFL. Mariano spent six years as a photographer in the automotive industry. In 2003, he founded Frantic Inc, a racing lifestyle brand. In 2019, Mariano started producing and hosting Frantic TV on YouTube, a talk show about cycling, fashion and tech.

== Recognition ==
In 2015, at a special ceremony at the Lincoln Center’s Frederick P. Rose Hall, Mariano won an Emmy in the category of Outstanding Live Sports Special for The XXII Olympic Winter Games - Sports Emmy Award: Outstanding New Approaches - Sports Event Coverage as associate producer.
