= Jeff Schultz =

Canadian ice hockey player

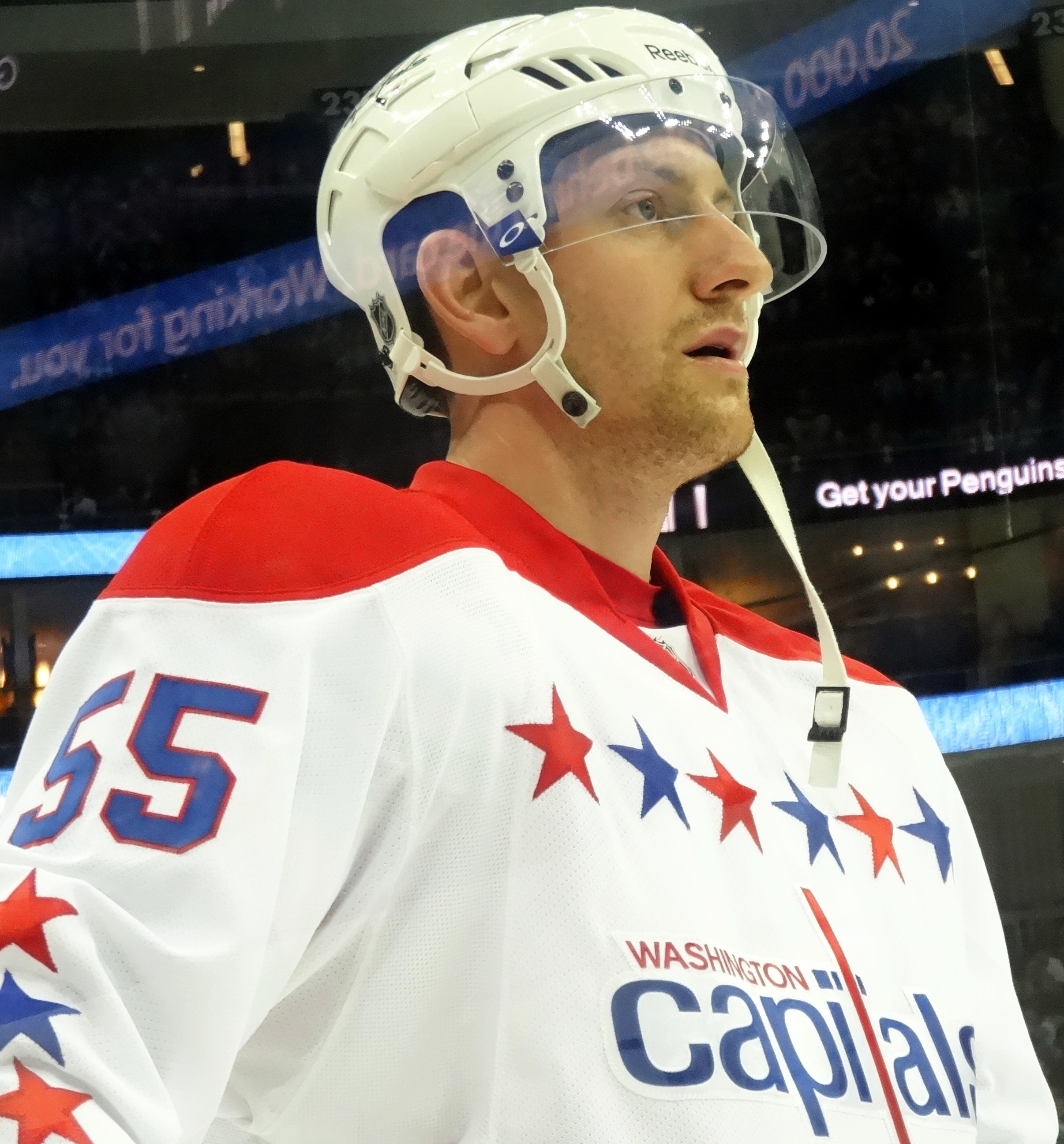
- Schultz with the Washington Capitals in March 2013
- Born: February 25, 1986 (age 40) Calgary, Alberta, Canada
- Height: 6 ft 6 in (198 cm)
- Weight: 230 lb (104 kg; 16 st 6 lb)
- Position: Defence
- Shot: Left
- Played for: Washington Capitals; Los Angeles Kings
- NHL draft: 27th overall, 2004; Washington Capitals
- Playing career: 2006–2018

Jeff Schultz (born February 25, 1986) is a Canadian former professional ice hockey defenceman. He most recently played for the San Diego Gulls in the American Hockey League (AHL). He was drafted by the Washington Capitals in the first round, 27th overall, in 2004.

== Playing career ==
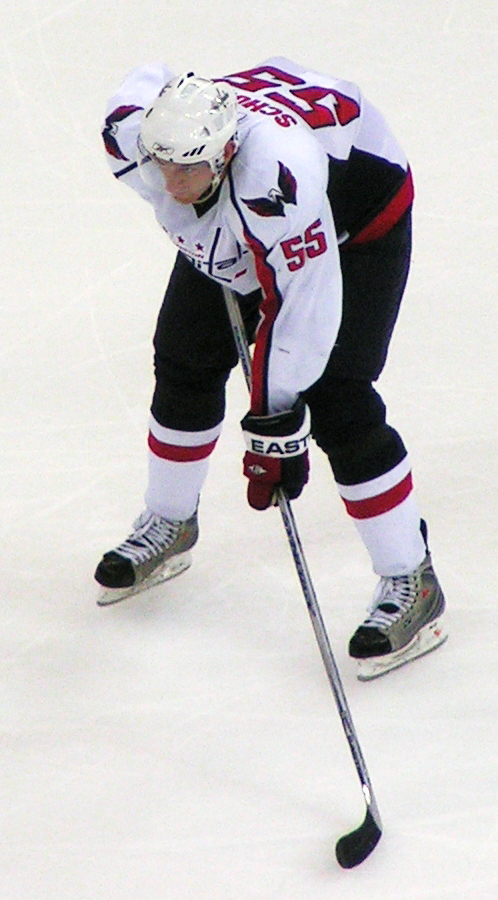
With the Capitals in November 2008.

Schultz was drafted by the Washington Capitals in the first round, 27th overall, in the 2004 NHL entry draft as one of the Capitals' three first-round picks that year.

Schultz spent four seasons (2002–03 to 2005–06) in the Western Hockey League (WHL) with the Calgary Hitmen. He played seven games in the 2005–06 playoffs for the Capitals' top minor league affiliate, the Hershey Bears, helping them capture the Calder Cup.

Schultz made his NHL debut for the Capitals on December 22, 2006, against the New Jersey Devils. He played four games with Washington before being returned to Hershey. At the end of the season, Schultz had played in 38 games with the Capitals.

Schultz was nicknamed "Mr. Nasty" by Pierre McGuire in January 2010. At the end of the 2009–10 season, Schultz led the NHL in the plus-minus statistical category with a +50 rating, becoming the first Capital to do so.

A record was set by Schultz in the 2011 Stanley Cup playoffs in Washington's 4–2 loss to the Tampa Bay Lightning in game one of the Eastern Conference Semi-final. He was on the ice for a post-season record 119 consecutive minutes without being scored upon in the Stanley Cup playoffs, before Steve Downie of the Lightning scored a goal.

On July 2, 2013, after two successive diminishing seasons on the Capitals, Schultz was given a compliance buyout of his final year of his contract with Washington, releasing him as an unrestricted free agent.

On July 5, 2013, he was signed as a free agent by the Los Angeles Kings to a one-year deal. He was later placed on waivers by the Kings shortly prior to the regular season's commencement. After clearing waivers, he reported to the Kings' AHL affiliate, the Manchester Monarchs. On December 3, Schultz was called up by the Kings, later being reassigned to Manchester on February 5, 2014; he did not make an appearance of Los Angeles during his two-month call-up.

Schultz was then recalled by the Kings during the 2014 playoffs because of injuries to many of the Kings' defensemen, and he made his debut with the Kings in game two of the Western Conference Semi-final against the Anaheim Ducks. He also made appearances during the 2014 Western Conference Final against the Chicago Blackhawks, but did not play in any of the 2014 Stanley Cup Final series in which the Kings won. Schultz normally would not have been qualified to have his name engraved on the Stanley Cup because he played neither the minimum number of regular season games nor any Stanley Cup Final games. Despite this, the Kings requested a waiver from the NHL to have his name included due to his contributions during the playoffs; the request was approved, and his name is among the 52 people added to the Cup that year.

On July 5, 2016, Schultz left the Kings organization as a free agent and signed a one-year, two-way contract with the Anaheim Ducks. He spent the duration of the 2016–17 season, with the Ducks AHL affiliate, the San Diego Gulls, appearing in 65 games from the blueline in recording 15 assists. Despite the conclusion of his contract with the Ducks, Schultz opted to remain with the Gulls, signing a one-year AHL deal on July 26, 2017.

== Personal life ==
Schultz has a younger brother, Ian, who was selected 87th overall in 2008 by the St. Louis Blues. Ian played in the AHL with the Hamilton Bulldogs as a prospect with the Montreal Canadiens for parts of three seasons. Unlike Jeff, Ian is a forward and is known as a tough player with a reputation for fighting on the ice.

== Career statistics ==
=== Regular season and playoffs ===
			Regular season					Playoffs
Season	Team	League	GP	G	A	Pts	PIM	GP	G	A	Pts	PIM
2002–03	Calgary Hitmen	WHL	50	2	1	3	4	4	0	0	0	0
2003–04	Calgary Hitmen	WHL	72	11	24	35	33	7	1	1	2	0
2004–05	Calgary Hitmen	WHL	72	2	27	29	31	12	2	1	3	6
2005–06	Calgary Hitmen	WHL	68	7	33	40	36	13	4	6	10	6
2005–06	Hershey Bears	AHL	—	—	—	—	—	7	1	3	4	4
2006–07	Hershey Bears	AHL	44	2	10	12	39	19	0	1	1	18
2006–07	Washington Capitals	NHL	38	0	3	3	16	—	—	—	—	—
2007–08	Washington Capitals	NHL	72	5	13	18	28	2	0	0	0	2
2007–08	Hershey Bears	AHL	1	0	0	0	0	—	—	—	—	—
2008–09	Washington Capitals	NHL	64	1	11	12	21	1	0	0	0	0
2009–10	Washington Capitals	NHL	73	3	20	23	32	7	0	1	1	4
2010–11	Washington Capitals	NHL	72	1	9	10	12	9	0	0	0	6
2011–12	Washington Capitals	NHL	54	1	5	6	12	10	0	0	0	2
2012–13	Washington Capitals	NHL	26	0	3	3	12	—	—	—	—	—
2013–14	Manchester Monarchs	AHL	67	2	11	13	32	2	0	0	0	2
2013–14	Los Angeles Kings	NHL	—	—	—	—	—	7	0	0	0	0
2014–15	Manchester Monarchs	AHL	52	3	13	16	30	14	0	3	3	10
2014–15	Los Angeles Kings	NHL	9	0	1	1	4	—	—	—	—	—
2015–16	Los Angeles Kings	NHL	1	0	0	0	0	—	—	—	—	—
2015–16	Ontario Reign	AHL	66	3	15	18	24	13	1	3	4	2
2016–17	San Diego Gulls	AHL	65	0	15	15	18	10	0	1	1	2
2017–18	San Diego Gulls	AHL	36	1	5	6	12	—	—	—	—	—
NHL totals			409	11	65	76	137	36	0	1	1	14

=== International ===
Year	Team	Event	Result	GP	G	A	Pts	PIM
2004	Canada	WJC18	4th	7	0	0	0	2
Junior totals				7	0	0	0	2

== Awards and achievements ==
Award	Year
WHL
East Second All-Star Team	2006
AHL
Calder Cup (Hershey Bears)	2006
Calder Cup (Manchester Monarchs)	2015
NHL
P Plus–minus Leader	2009–10
Stanley Cup champion	2014

Awards and achievements
Preceded by Alexander Ovechkin	Washington Capitals first-round draft pick 2004	Succeeded by Mike Green
