= 2014 Stanley Cup Final =

2014 ice hockey championship series

	1	2	3	4	5	Total
New York Rangers	2*	4**	0	2	2**	1
Los Angeles Kings	3*	5**	3	1	3**	4
- * – Denotes overtime period(s)
- Location(s): New York City: Madison Square Garden (3, 4); Los Angeles: Staples Center (1, 2, 5)
- Coaches: NY Rangers: Alain Vigneault; Los Angeles: Darryl Sutter
- Captains: NY Rangers: Vacant; Los Angeles: Dustin Brown
- National anthems: NY Rangers: John Amirante; Los Angeles: The Tenors (1); Pia Toscano (2, 5)
- Referees: Steve Kozari (1, 3, 5); Brad Watson (1, 3, 5); Wes McCauley (2, 4); Dan O'Halloran (2, 4)
- Dates: June 4–13, 2014
- MVP: Justin Williams (Kings)
- Series-winning goal: Alec Martinez (14:43, second OT)
- Hall of Famers: Rangers: Henrik Lundqvist (2023); Martin St. Louis (2018)
- Networks: Canada: (English): CBC (French): RDS; United States: (English): NBC (1–2, 5), NBCSN (3–4)
- Announcers: (CBC) Jim Hughson, Craig Simpson, and Glenn Healy (RDS) Pierre Houde and Marc Denis (NBC/NBCSN) Kenny Albert (1), Mike Emrick (2–5), Eddie Olczyk, and Pierre McGuire (NHL International) Dave Strader and Joe Micheletti

The 2014 Stanley Cup Final was the championship series of the National Hockey League's (NHL) 2013–14 season, and the culmination of the 2014 Stanley Cup playoffs. The League realigned its divisions prior to the season, and changed the structure of the playoffs, but the championship series remained the same. The Western Conference champion Los Angeles Kings defeated the Eastern Conference champion New York Rangers four games to one to win their second championship in franchise history, marking the first time since 2007 that the championship series was determined in fewer than six games. Their Stanley Cup–winning run of 26 playoff games was later tied by the 2019 St. Louis Blues for the longest of any Stanley Cup–winning team in history.

Los Angeles had home ice advantage in the series, as the Kings finished with a better regular season record than the Rangers. The series started on June 4 and ended on June 13 with the Kings winning their second Stanley Cup in three seasons. It was the first meeting between teams from New York City and Los Angeles for a major professional sports championship since the Yankees and the Dodgers played in the 1981 World Series. Coincidentally, 1981 was also the last time the Rangers and the Kings had met in the postseason; that was the last season where the league did not use a geographical based playoff format and as a result any two teams could meet in any round of the postseason regardless of geography. In 1981 the Rangers eliminated the Kings during the first round of the playoffs.

== Paths to the Finals ==
This was the eighth meeting between teams from Los Angeles and New York City for a major professional sports championship. This previously occurred in four World Series (1963, 1977, 1978, 1981), and three NBA Finals (1970, 1972, 1973).

=== New York Rangers ===
This was New York's 11th appearance in the Stanley Cup Final, and they were seeking their fifth Cup championship overall and their first one since 1994, 20 years earlier. Since their win in 1994, their only other post-season highlights were reaching the Conference Finals in 1997 and 2012.

The Rangers entered the season after essentially swapping head coaches with the Vancouver Canucks: the Rangers and the Canucks fired John Tortorella and Alain Vigneault, respectively, and then coincidentally hired the other's former coach. While Vancouver, under Tortorella's first year, failed to make the playoffs, Vigneault guided New York to 96 regular season points and second place in the new Metropolitan Division. En route, the Rangers made a major trade with the Tampa Bay Lightning on March 5, acquiring Tampa Bay's captain Martin St. Louis in exchange for their own captain Ryan Callahan. The transaction happened as Callahan and the Rangers were not close to terms on a new contract, while St. Louis was unhappy at his initial omission from the Olympics by Steve Yzerman (general manager of both the Lightning and Team Canada).

In the first round of the playoffs, the Rangers eliminated the Philadelphia Flyers in seven games. Then, in the second round against the Pittsburgh Penguins, New York overcame a 3–1 game deficit to win the series. In the Eastern Conference Finals, the Rangers defeated the Montreal Canadiens in six games to capture their first Eastern Conference championship in 20 years. In the process, the Rangers became the first team ever to play two full seven-game series in the first two rounds of the playoffs and reach the Stanley Cup Final, a feat later matched and exceeded in the same postseason by the Kings.

Due to trading away captain Ryan Callahan and not naming a successor for the remainder of the season, Rangers were the first team since the 1972–73 Chicago Black Hawks to advance to the Stanley Cup Final without a captain.

By reaching the Finals with the Rangers, Mats Zuccarello made history when he became the first Norwegian to play in the Stanley Cup Final.

=== Los Angeles Kings ===
Los Angeles made their third appearance in the Stanley Cup Final and sought to capture their second Cup championship after winning it in 2012.

Much of the core from the Kings' 2012 championship remained on the team. Los Angeles made a late regular season trade on March 5, acquiring former Ranger Marian Gaborik from the Columbus Blue Jackets in exchange for Matt Frattin and two draft picks. The Kings then finished the regular season in third place in the Pacific Division with 100 points.

The Finals were the only series in the 2014 playoffs in which the Kings had home ice advantage. Los Angeles needed three consecutive game sevens to advance to the Cup Finals (breaking the aforementioned Rangers' game sevens record just a couple of days later), winning all of them on the road. The team became the fourth team in NHL playoff history to win a seven-game series after losing the first three games, defeating the San Jose Sharks in the first round. The Kings eliminated their local rival Anaheim Ducks next, despite squandering a 2–0 series lead and then facing a 3–2 series deficit. In a rematch of the 2013 Western Conference Final, the Kings defeated the defending Stanley Cup champion Chicago Blackhawks in the Western Conference Final who had forced a seventh game after trailing the series 3–1.

Like their 2012 championship series, the Kings' 2014 Cup Finals was marked by a 3–0 series start of winning the first two games in overtime and the third as a shutout. With their 2014 Stanley Cup win, the Kings have the distinction of winning the first championship after the League's realignment as well as becoming the first team in the salary-cap era to win two championships in the span of three years or less. Their 2012 championship made them also the final team to win the Cup in the League's last full season before the realignment, as the 2012–13 season was shortened by a lockout. The Kings played a record 26 playoff games to win the Stanley Cup, the most ever for a champion (the St. Louis Blues matched this feat in 2019).

== Game summaries ==
Number in parentheses represents the player's total in goals or assists to that point of the entire four rounds of the playoffs

=== Game one ===
June 4	New York Rangers	2–3	OT	Los Angeles Kings	Staples Center	Recap

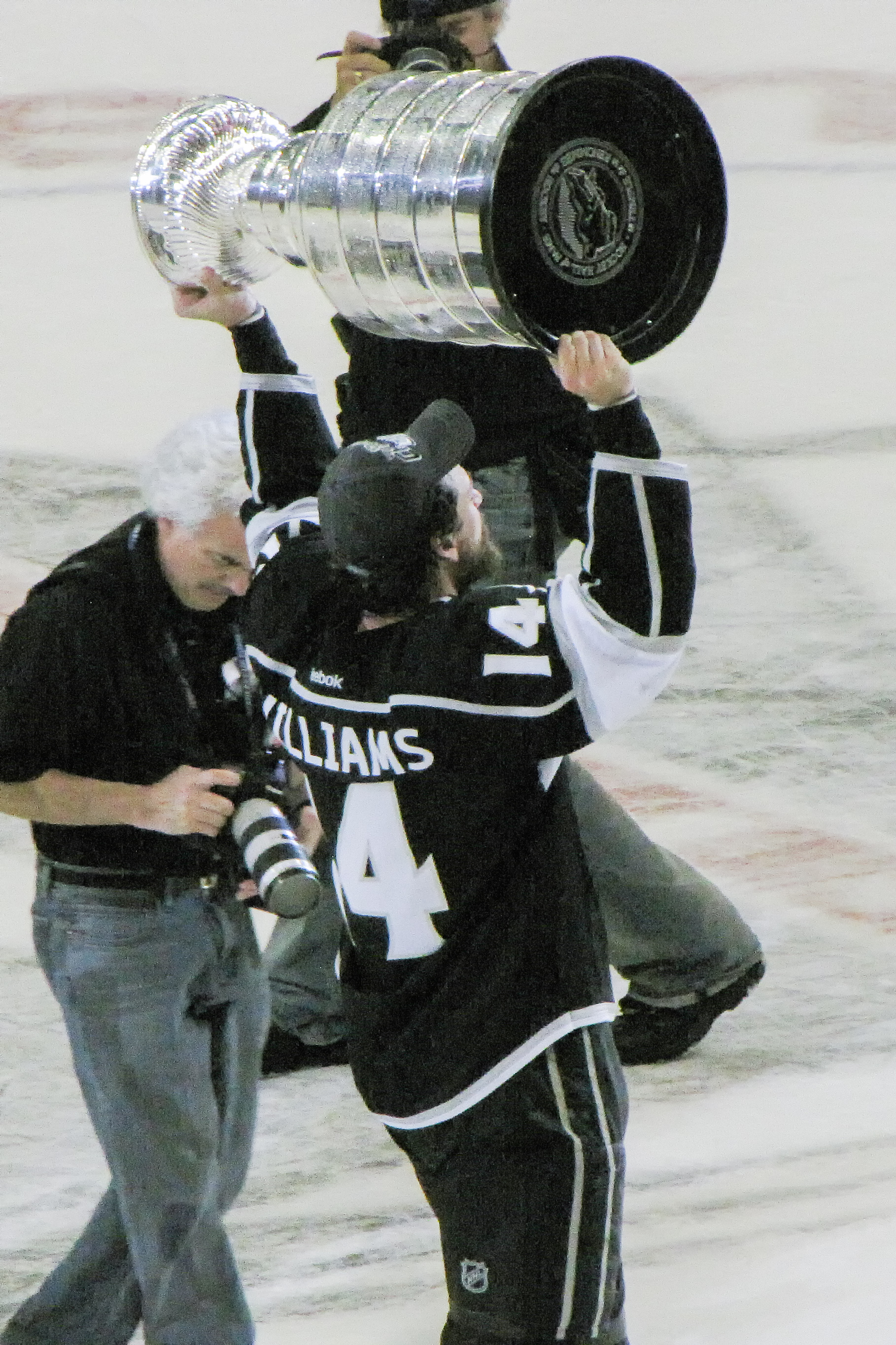
Justin Williams scored two points, including the game-winning goal in overtime of Game 1.

The Kings overcame a two-goal deficit to defeat the Rangers 3–2 in the first game. New York built their 2–0 lead in the first period by scoring 1:42 apart. Benoit Pouliot scored first on a breakaway after stealing the puck from Drew Doughty, then shooting past Jonathan Quick. Carl Hagelin then recorded a short-handed goal, as his shot was initially blocked by Quick but then rebounded off of Slava Voynov's skate into the net. The Kings' comeback began with Kyle Clifford's goal late in the first period. Clifford shot it in from near the left post after receiving a pass from Jeff Carter. Doughty tied the game in the second period, beating Henrik Lundqvist from the left circle. In the third period, the Kings outshot the Rangers, 20–3, but neither Lundqvist nor Quick allowed any goals. In the final minute of regulation, Quick stopped Hagelin's shot on a breakaway, and seconds later Lundqvist barely kept Carter's wrap-around shot from crossing the goal line. In overtime, Daniel Girardi turned over the puck in the New York zone, leading Mike Richards to pass the puck to Justin Williams, who then put the puck over Lundqvist to win the game.

Scoring summary
Period	Team	Goal	Assist(s)	Time	Score
1st	NYR	Benoit Pouliot (4)	Unassisted	13:21	1–0 NYR
1st	NYR	Carl Hagelin (7) – sh	Brian Boyle (5) and Ryan McDonagh (11)	15:03	2–0 NYR
1st	LAK	Kyle Clifford (1)	Jeff Carter (14)	17:33	2–1 NYR
2nd	LAK	Drew Doughty (5)	Justin Williams (12) and Kyle Clifford (4)	06:36	2–2 TIE
3rd	None				
OT	LAK	Justin Williams (8)	Mike Richards (7)	04:36	3–2 LAK
Penalty summary
Period	Team	Player	Penalty	Time	PIM
1st	LAK	Alec Martinez	Hooking	09:12	2:00
1st	NYR	Mats Zuccarello	Holding	14:34	2:00
2nd	LAK	Jake Muzzin	Interference	03:54	2:00
2nd	NYR	Derick Brassard	Boarding	06:45	2:00
2nd	LAK	Mike Richards	Slashing	18:41	2:00
3rd	NYR	Daniel Girardi	Hooking	02:37	2:00
3rd	NYR	Rick Nash	Holding	07:54	2:00
3rd	LAK	Drew Doughty	Embellishment	07:54	2:00
3rd	NYR	Brian Boyle	Slashing	18:24	2:00
OT	None				

Shots by period
Team	1	2	3	OT	Total
NY Rangers	13	9	3	2	27
Los Angeles	14	7	20	2	43

=== Game two ===
June 7	New York Rangers	4–5	2OT	Los Angeles Kings	Staples Center	Recap

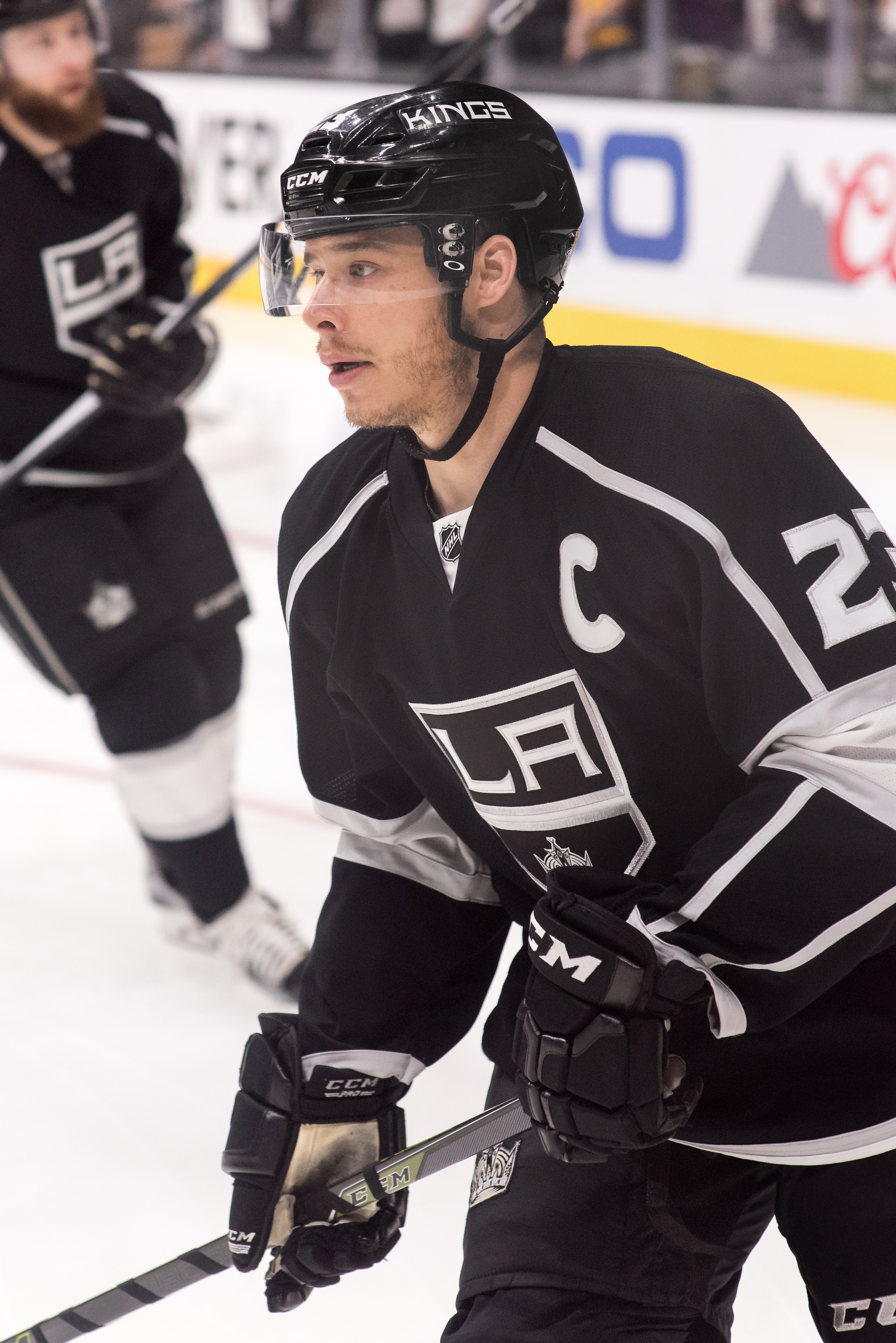
Dustin Brown scored the game-winning goal in overtime of Game 2.

The Kings overcame three two-goal deficits to defeat the Rangers 5–4 in double overtime. Including their game seven victory in the Western Conference Final against the Chicago Blackhawks, Los Angeles became the first team in Stanley Cup playoffs history to overcome three consecutive two-goal deficits. With the first game also going to overtime, it marked the third consecutive year that the first two games of the Stanley Cup Final went to overtime. Ryan McDonagh and Mats Zuccarello scored in the first period to give the Rangers a 2–0 lead. Jarret Stoll then cut New York's lead in half at 1:46 of the second period. The teams then traded power play goals with Martin St. Louis scoring for the Rangers and Willie Mitchell for the Kings. Eleven seconds after Mitchell's goal, Derick Brassard gave New York a 4–2 lead after miscommunication between Mitchell and Jonathan Quick behind the Kings net lead to a turnover. Dwight King's goal to cut the Rangers' lead to 4–3 early in the third period was controversial. King and McDonagh were fighting for position in front of Henrik Lundqvist when Matt Greene shot the puck from the right point. King made contact with Lundqvist in the crease as he touched the puck before it went into the net but no goaltender interference was called: the referee ruled that the contact occurred after the puck already sailed past Lundqvist. Marian Gaborik then tied the game with an unassisted goal at 7:36 of the third during a scramble in front of the New York net. At 10:26 of double overtime, Dustin Brown deflected Mitchell's shot from the left point into the net to give the Kings the 5–4 win. This gave the Kings a 2–0 series lead as the series shifted to New York City, despite never leading in either game during regulation time in Los Angeles.

Scoring summary
Period	Team	Goal	Assist(s)	Time	Score
1st	NYR	Ryan McDonagh (4)	Dominic Moore (5)	10:48	1–0 NYR
1st	NYR	Mats Zuccarello (5)	Ryan McDonagh (12) and Derick Brassard (5)	18:46	2–0 NYR
2nd	LAK	Jarret Stoll (3)	Justin Williams (13) and Dwight King (7)	01:46	2–1 NYR
2nd	NYR	Martin St. Louis (7) – pp	Derek Stepan (9) and Chris Kreider (7)	11:24	3–1 NYR
2nd	LAK	Willie Mitchell (1) – pp	Slava Voynov (6) and Justin Williams (14)	14:39	3–2 NYR
2nd	NYR	Derick Brassard (6)	Mats Zuccarello (8)	14:50	4–2 NYR
3rd	LAK	Dwight King (3)	Matt Greene (4) and Justin Williams (15)	01:58	4–3 NYR
3rd	LAK	Marian Gaborik (13)	Unassisted	07:36	4–4 TIE
OT	None				
2OT	LAK	Dustin Brown (5)	Willie Mitchell (3) and Anze Kopitar (20)	10:26	5–4 LAK
Penalty summary
Period	Team	Player	Penalty	Time	PIM
1st	LAK	Marian Gaborik	Tripping	07:58	2:00
1st	NYR	Ryan McDonagh	Cross-checking	15:06	2:00
2nd	LAK	Matt Greene	Tripping	02:26	2:00
2nd	NYR	Benoit Pouliot	Goaltender interference	07:07	2:00
2nd	LAK	Bench (served by Kyle Clifford)	Too many men on the ice	10:44	2:00
2nd	NYR	Mats Zuccarello	Tripping	12:43	2:00
3rd	None				
OT	NYR	Dominic Moore	High-sticking	10:01	2:00
OT	LAK	Justin Williams	Interference	11:24	2:00
OT	LAK	Jeff Carter	Goaltender interference	14:27	2:00
2OT	None				

Shots by period
Team	1	2	3	OT	2OT	Total
NY Rangers	10	12	7	8	1	38
Los Angeles	9	11	12	6	6	44

=== Game three ===
June 9	Los Angeles Kings	3–0	New York Rangers	Madison Square Garden	Recap

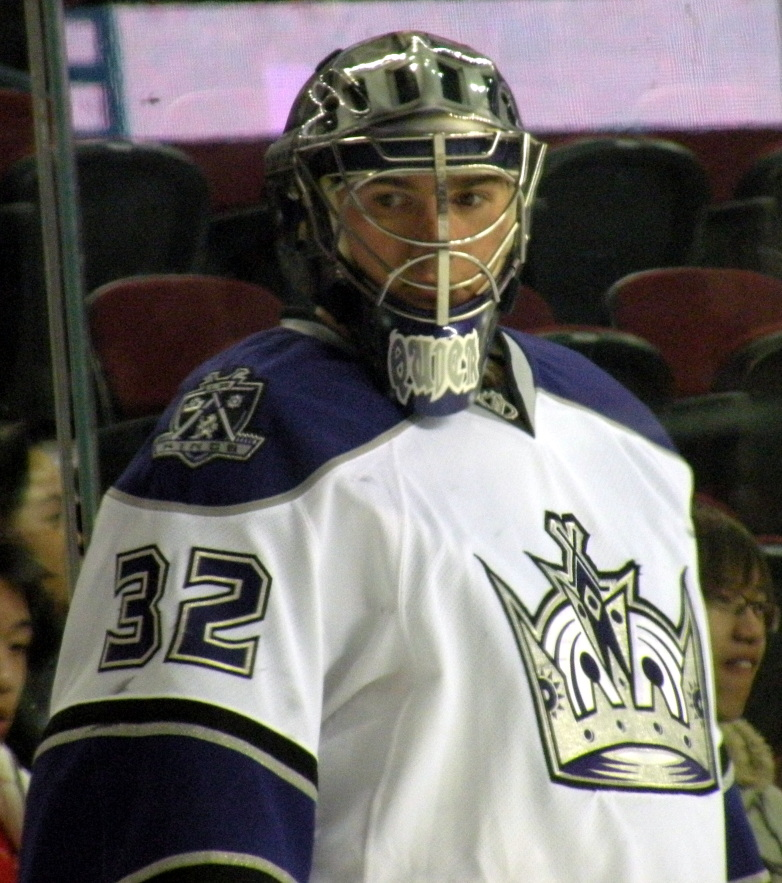
Jonathan Quick recorded a 32-save shutout in Game 3.

This was the first Stanley Cup Final game played in the state of New York since Game 6 of the 1999 Finals in Buffalo. The Kings won 3–0, led by the goaltending of Jonathan Quick, who shut out the Rangers on 32 shots. The first period was marked by tight checking, and only nine shots were recorded by the two teams. Mats Zuccarello nearly scored for the Rangers at 12:37 of the first, but his shot went off the post and Quick's stick to stay out. With one second to play, Jeff Carter's shot from the slot deflected off a Rangers defenceman past Henrik Lundqvist to put the Kings ahead by one. In the second period, Jake Muzzin scored from the point on another deflection off a Rangers player. Mike Richards scored later in the period, on a two-on-one, his attempted pass deflecting off a Rangers player back to him, leaving Lundqvist out of position to make the stop. Meanwhile, Quick stopped all 17 shots the Rangers put on the net in the second, including a stick save on Derick Brassard when he appeared to be well out of position to make the save. There was no scoring in the third and the Kings took a three games to none series lead, putting the Rangers on the brink of elimination.

Scoring summary
Period	Team	Goal	Assist(s)	Time	Score
1st	LAK	Jeff Carter (10)	Justin Williams (16) and Slava Voynov (7)	19:59	1–0 LAK
2nd	LAK	Jake Muzzin (6) – pp	Anze Kopitar (21) and Marian Gaborik (8)	04:17	2–0 LAK
2nd	LAK	Mike Richards (3)	Kyle Clifford (5)	17:14	3–0 LAK
3rd	None				
Penalty summary
Period	Team	Player	Penalty	Time	PIM
1st	LAK	Willie Mitchell	High-sticking	17:42	2:00
2nd	NYR	Ryan McDonagh	High-sticking	00:59	2:00
2nd	NYR	Marc Staal	High-sticking	03:18	2:00
2nd	LAK	Willie Mitchell	Elbowing	08:13	2:00
2nd	LAK	Drew Doughty	Hooking	11:53	2:00
2nd	NYR	Carl Hagelin	Slashing	13:51	2:00
2nd	LAK	Jake Muzzin	Interference	17:44	2:00
3rd	LAK	Matt Greene	Tripping	01:02	2:00
3rd	NYR	Chris Kreider	Interference	05:58	2:00
3rd	LAK	Dustin Brown	Slashing	09:53	2:00

Shots by period
Team	1	2	3	Total
Los Angeles	5	8	2	15
NY Rangers	4	17	11	32

=== Game four ===
June 11	Los Angeles Kings	1–2	New York Rangers	Madison Square Garden	Recap

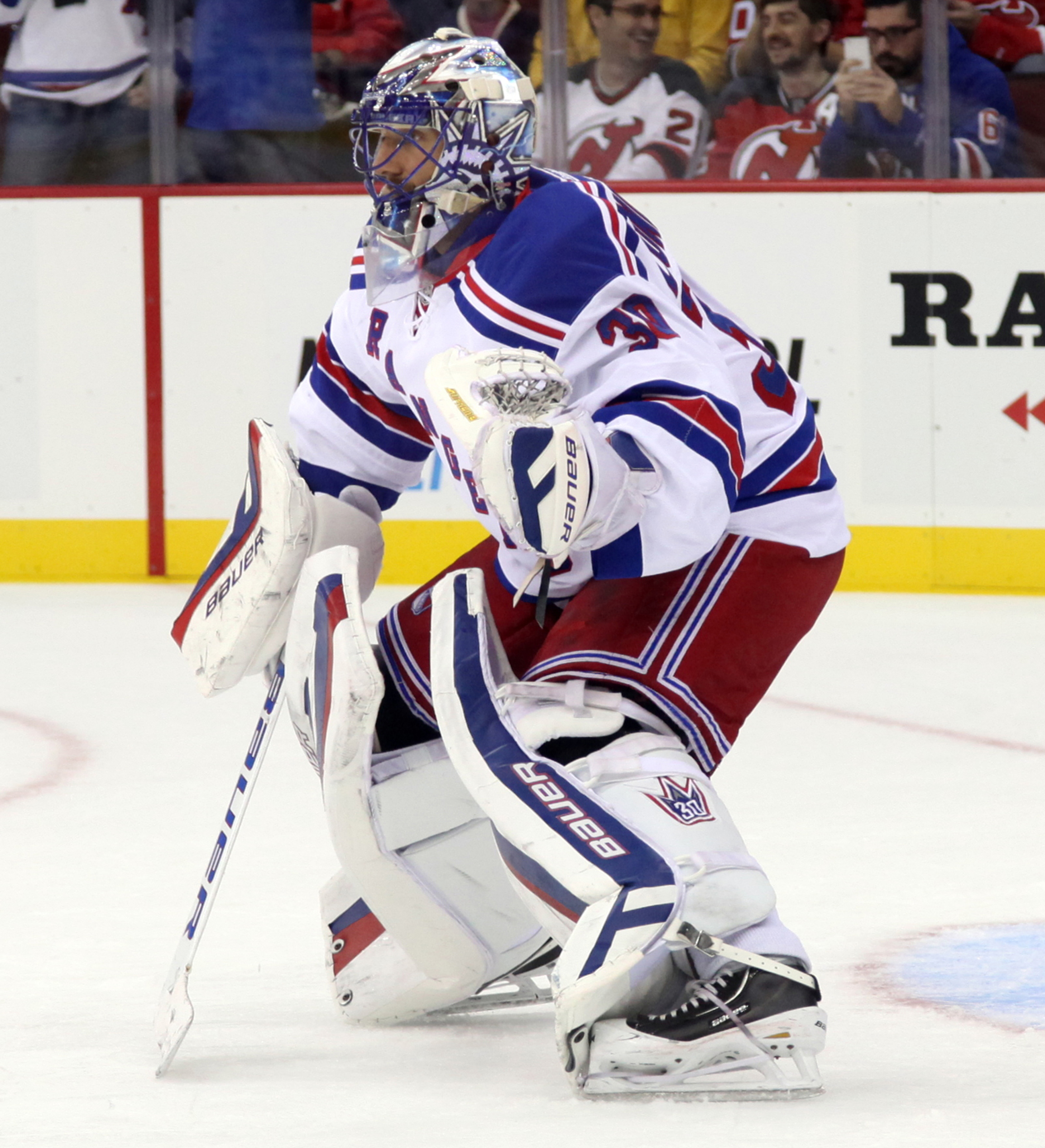
Henrik Lundqvist stopped 40 of 41 shots in Game 4.

The Rangers avoided becoming the first team since 1998 to get swept in the Finals by defeating the Kings 2–1. In a turn-around from game three, the Kings outshot the Rangers and lost as Rangers netminder Henrik Lundqvist saved 40 out of 41 shots. Like games one and two, the Rangers scored the first two goals, on goals by Benoit Pouliot and Martin St. Louis. Dustin Brown scored for the Kings in the second period to cut the margin to 2–1. In the third period, the Kings put pressure on the Rangers and nearly tied the score when the puck slid past Lundqvist to rest on the goal line before being cleared away. Earlier, in the first period, another shot by the Kings also rested on the goal line and did not go in. In all, the Kings outshot the Rangers 15–1 in the third, but did not score.

Scoring summary
Period	Team	Goal	Assist(s)	Time	Score
1st	NYR	Benoit Pouliot (5)	John Moore (2) and Derick Brassard (6)	07:25	1–0 NYR
2nd	NYR	Martin St. Louis (8)	Chris Kreider (8) and Derek Stepan (10)	06:27	2–0 NYR
2nd	LAK	Dustin Brown (6)	Unassisted	08:46	2–1 NYR
3rd	None				
Penalty summary
Period	Team	Player	Penalty	Time	PIM
1st	LAK	Willie Mitchell	High-sticking	05:23	2:00
1st	NYR	Mats Zuccarello	Delay of game (puck over glass)	11:39	2:00
2nd	LAK	Willie Mitchell	Hooking	02:14	2:00
2nd	LAK	Drew Doughty	Roughing	04:07	2:00
2nd	NYR	Benoit Pouliot	Roughing	04:07	2:00
2nd	LAK	Tyler Toffoli	Slashing	06:44	2:00
2nd	NYR	Dominic Moore	Cross-checking	15:32	2:00
3rd	None				

Shots by period
Team	1	2	3	Total
Los Angeles	11	15	15	41
NY Rangers	7	11	1	19

=== Game five ===
June 13	New York Rangers	2–3	2OT	Los Angeles Kings	Staples Center	Recap

External videos
- Game 5 Full replay (CBC's feed) on the NHL's official YouTube channel

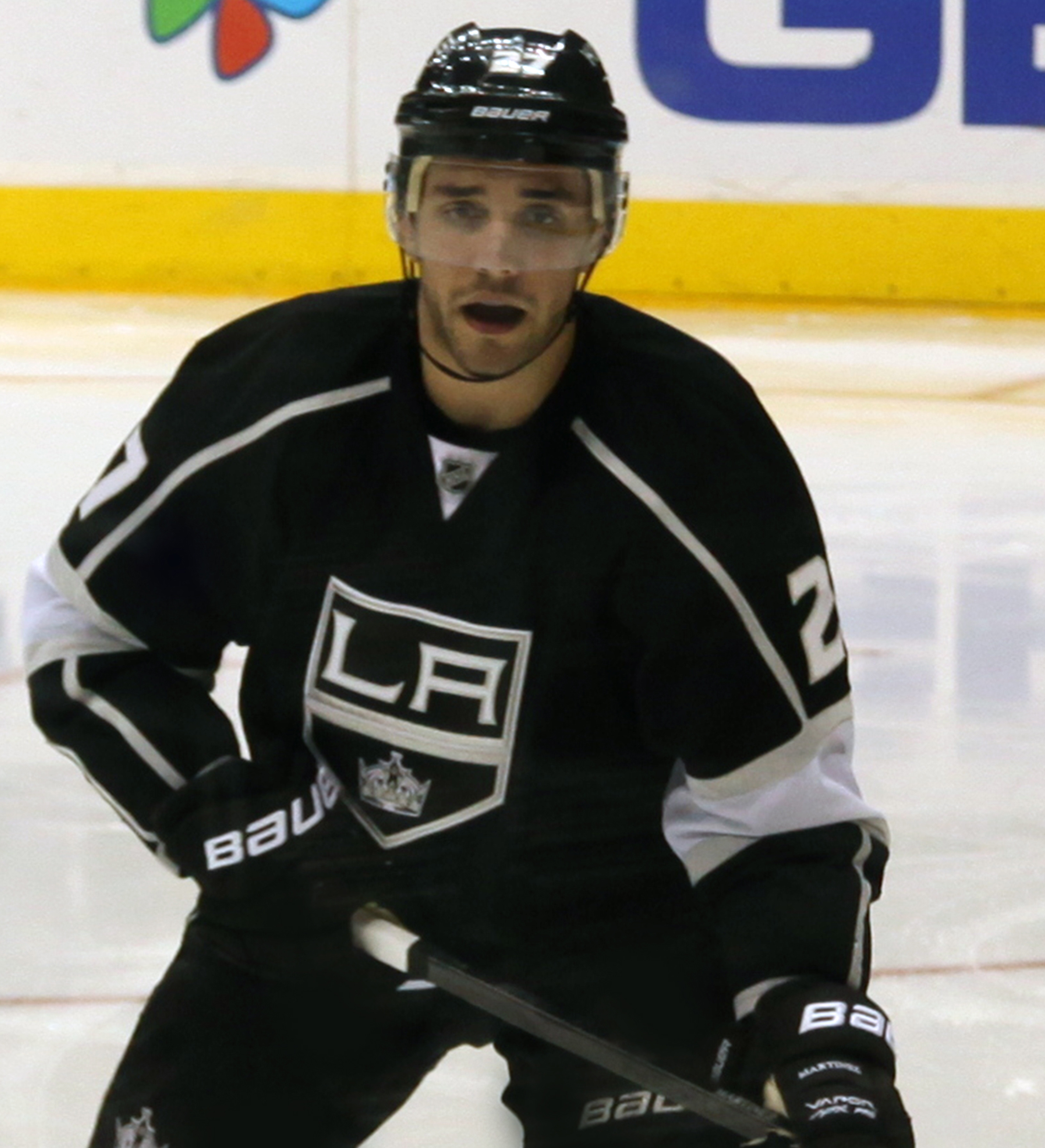
Alec Martinez scored the Stanley Cup-clinching overtime goal in Game 5.

The Kings clinched their second Stanley Cup in franchise history, their first since 2012, by defeating the Rangers 3–2 on home ice. This was the first Stanley Cup–clinching game since 2010 to be determined in overtime, and the first time that the home team had the overtime Stanley Cup winner since 1980. The Kings played 26 playoff games on their road to the trophy, more than any previous Stanley Cup–winning team.

The Kings grabbed the lead in the first period with an even-strength goal by Justin Williams. In the second, Chris Kreider converted on a Rangers power play before Brian Boyle scored a short-handed goal to put the road team up by one with 30 seconds left. In the third, Marian Gaborik tied the game at two on a Kings power play. No more goals were scored in regulation and the game went to overtime. The first overtime period featured one penalty for the Kings, but the Rangers were unable to score on the ensuing power play. With five minutes to go in the second overtime period and the Kings on a 3-on-2 breakaway, Tyler Toffoli fired a shot that Henrik Lundqvist kicked out directly to Alec Martinez, who fired it into the open net to win both the game and the series for the Kings. At that time, the Kings had outshot the Rangers 51–30. It was the longest game in Kings history until 2018.

Scoring summary
Period	Team	Goal	Assist(s)	Time	Score
1st	LAK	Justin Williams (9)	Dwight King (8) and Jarret Stoll (3)	06:04	1–0 LAK
2nd	NYR	Chris Kreider (5) – pp	Ryan McDonagh (13) and Brad Richards (7)	15:37	1–1 TIE
2nd	NYR	Brian Boyle (3) – sh	Carl Hagelin (5)	19:30	2–1 NYR
3rd	LAK	Marian Gaborik (14) – pp	Drew Doughty (13) and Jeff Carter (15)	07:56	2–2 TIE
OT	None				
2OT	LAK	Alec Martinez (5)	Tyler Toffoli (7) and Kyle Clifford (6)	14:43	3–2 LAK
Penalty summary
Period	Team	Player	Penalty	Time	PIM
1st	NYR	Rick Nash	Hooking	01:44	2:00
1st	LAK	Dustin Brown	Holding	07:49	2:00
1st	NYR	Benoit Pouliot	Goaltender interference	17:34	2:00
1st	LAK	Drew Doughty	Cross-checking	18:48	2:00
2nd	LAK	Dwight King	High-sticking	14:07	2:00
2nd	NYR	Dominic Moore	Hooking	17:37	2:00
3rd	NYR	Mats Zuccarello	Tripping	07:39	2:00
OT	LAK	Slava Voynov	Hooking	03:54	2:00
2OT	LAK	Kyle Clifford	Boarding	05:43	2:00

Shots by period
Team	1	2	3	OT	2OT	Total
NY Rangers	6	6	3	10	5	30
Los Angeles	7	10	12	13	9	51

== Team rosters ==
Years indicated in boldface under the "Finals appearance" column signify that the player won the Stanley Cup in the given year.

=== Los Angeles Kings ===
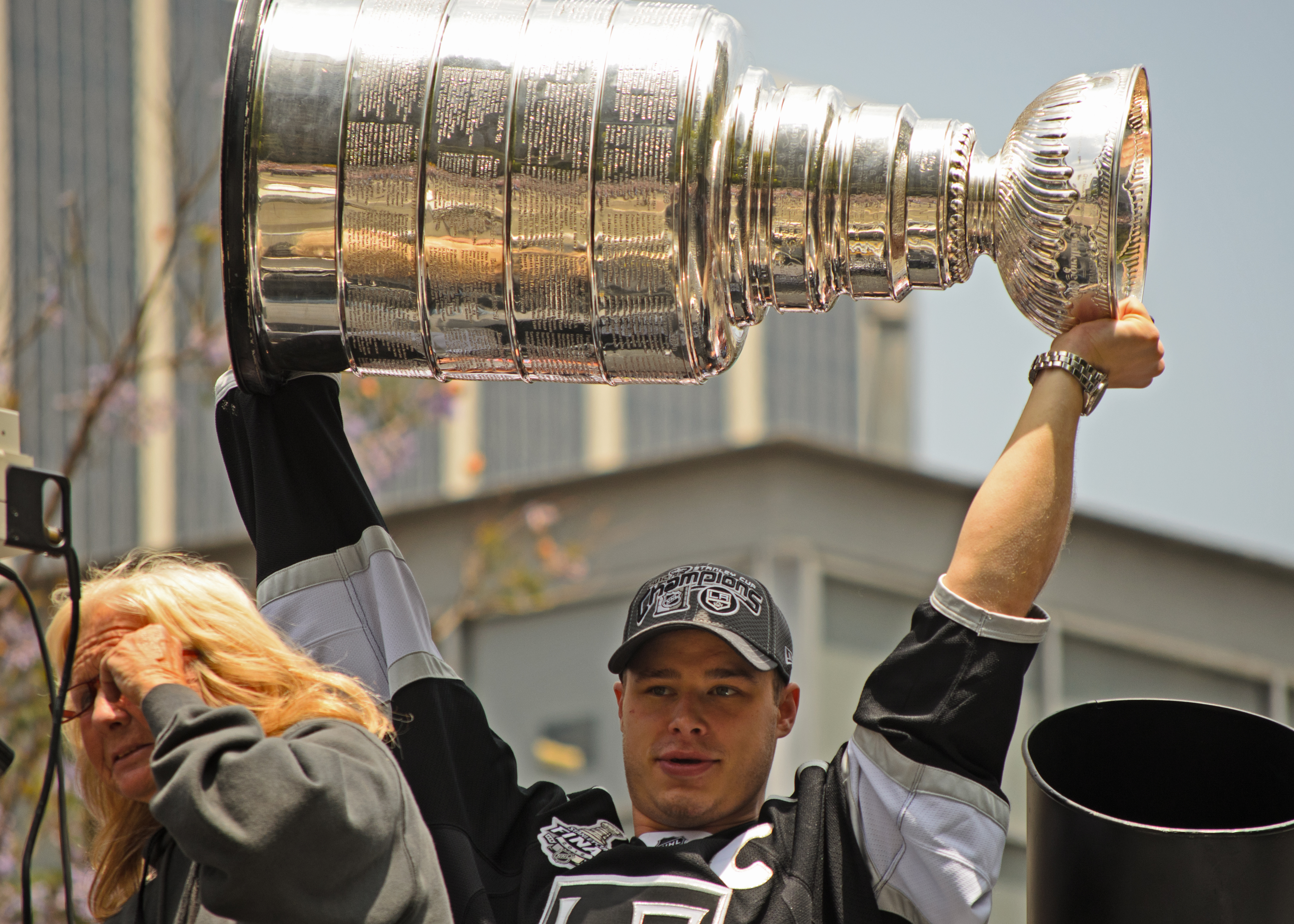
Dustin Brown captained the Kings to their second championship in franchise history, and their second championship in three seasons

#	Nat	Player	Position	Hand	Age	Acquired	Place of birth	Finals appearance
23	(United States)	Dustin Brown – **C**	RW/LW	R	29	2003	Ithaca, New York	second (**2012**)
77	(Canada)	Jeff Carter	C/RW	R	29	2012	London, Ontario	third (2010, **2012**)
13	(Canada)	Kyle Clifford	LW	L	23	2009	Ayr, Ontario	second (**2012**)
8	(Canada)	Drew Doughty	D	R	24	2008	London, Ontario	second (**2012**)
24	(Canada)	Colin Fraser	C	L	29	2011	Sicamous, British Columbia	third (**2010, 2012**) (did not play)
12	(Slovakia)	Marian Gaborik	LW	L	32	2014	Trenčín, Czechoslovakia	first
2	(United States)	Matt Greene – **A**	D	R	31	2008	Grand Ledge, Michigan	third (2006, **2012**)
31	(Canada)	Martin Jones	G	L	24	2008	North Vancouver, British Columbia	first
74	(Canada)	Dwight King	LW	L	24	2007	Meadow Lake, Saskatchewan	second (**2012**)
11	(Slovenia)	Anze Kopitar – **A**	C	L	26	2005	Jesenice, Yugoslavia	second (**2012**)
22	(United States)	Trevor Lewis	C/RW	R	27	2006	Salt Lake City, Utah	second (**2012**)
27	(United States)	Alec Martinez	D	L	26	2007	Rochester Hills, Michigan	second (**2012**)
33	(Canada)	Willie Mitchell	D	L	37	2010	Port McNeill, British Columbia	second (**2012**)
6	(Canada)	Jake Muzzin	D	L	25	2010	Woodstock, Ontario	first
71	(Canada)	Jordan Nolan	C/RW	L	24	2009	Garden River, Ontario	second (**2012**) (did not play)
70	(Canada)	Tanner Pearson	LW	L	21	2012	Kitchener, Ontario	first
32	(United States)	Jonathan Quick	G	L	28	2005	Milford, Connecticut	second (**2012**)
44	(Canada)	Robyn Regehr	D	L	34	2013	Recife, Brazil	second (2004) (did not play)
10	(Canada)	Mike Richards	C	L	29	2011	Kenora, Ontario	third (2010, **2012**)
55	(Canada)	Jeff Schultz	D	L	28	2013	Calgary, Alberta	first (did not play)
28	(Canada)	Jarret Stoll	C	R	31	2008	Melville, Saskatchewan	third (2006, **2012**)
73	(Canada)	Tyler Toffoli	RW	R	22	2010	Scarborough, Ontario	first
26	(Russia)	Slava Voynov	D	R	24	2008	Chelyabinsk, Soviet Union	second (**2012**)
14	(Canada)	Justin Williams	RW	R	32	2009	Cobourg, Ontario	third (**2006**, **2012**)

=== New York Rangers ===
#	Nat	Player	Position	Hand	Age	Acquired	Place of birth	Finals appearance
22	(United States)	Brian Boyle	C/LW	L	29	2009	Hingham, Massachusetts	first
16	(Canada)	Derick Brassard	C	L	26	2013	Hull, Quebec	first
4	(Switzerland)	Raphael Diaz	D	R	28	2014	Baar, Switzerland	first
15	(Canada)	Derek Dorsett	RW	R	27	2013	Kindersley, Saskatchewan	first
5	(Canada)	Daniel Girardi – **A**	D	R	30	2006	Welland, Ontario	first
62	(Sweden)	Carl Hagelin	LW	L	25	2007	Södertälje, Sweden	first
8	(Canada)	Kevin Klein	D	R	29	2014	Kitchener, Ontario	first
20	(United States)	Chris Kreider	LW	L	23	2009	Boxford, Massachusetts	first
29	(Canada)	David LeNeveu	G	L	31	2014	Fernie, British Columbia	first
30	(Sweden)	Henrik Lundqvist	G	L	32	2000	Åre, Sweden	first
27	(United States)	Ryan McDonagh	D	L	25	2009	Saint Paul, Minnesota	first
28	(Canada)	Dominic Moore	C	L	33	2013	Sarnia, Ontario	first
17	(United States)	John Moore	D	L	23	2013	Winnetka, Illinois	first
61	(Canada)	Rick Nash	LW	L	29	2012	Brampton, Ontario	first
67	(Canada)	Benoit Pouliot	LW	R	27	2013	Alfred, Ontario	first
19	(Canada)	Brad Richards – **A**	C	L	34	2011	Murray Harbour, Prince Edward Island	second (**2004**)
26	(Canada)	Martin St. Louis	RW	L	38	2014	Laval, Quebec	second (**2004**)
18	(Canada)	Marc Staal – **A**	D	L	27	2005	Thunder Bay, Ontario	first
21	(United States)	Derek Stepan	C	R	23	2008	Hastings, Minnesota	first
6	(Sweden)	Anton Stralman	D	R	27	2011	Tibro, Sweden	first
33	(Canada)	Cam Talbot	G	L	26	2010	Caledonia, Ontario	first (did not dress)
36	(Norway)	Mats Zuccarello	LW	L	26	2010	Oslo, Norway	first

== Stanley Cup engraving ==
The 2014 Stanley Cup was presented to Kings captain Dustin Brown by NHL Commissioner Gary Bettman following the Kings 3–2 overtime win over the Rangers in game five.

2013–14 Los Angeles Kings

=== Players ===
Centres

- 10 Mike Richards
- 11 Anze Kopitar (A)
- 22 Trevor Lewis*
- 28 Jarret Stoll
- 71 Jordan Nolan*†
- 77 Jeff Carter*

Wingers

- 12 Marian Gaborik
- 13 Kyle Clifford
- 14 Justin Williams
- 23 Dustin Brown (Captain)
- 70 Tanner Pearson
- 73 Tyler Toffoli
- 74 Dwight King

Defencemen

- 2 Matt Greene (A)
- 6 Jake Muzzin
- 8 Drew Doughty
- 26 Slava Voynov
- 27 Alec Martinez
- 33 Willie Mitchell
- 44 Robyn Regehr †
- 55 Jeff Schultz ‡

Goaltenders

- 31 Martin Jones
- 32 Jonathan Quick
- * Played both centre and wing.
- † Did not play or dress in the Final. (Note: 1. 44 Robyn Regehr (D) missed the entire Final due to a knee injury. #71 Jordan Nolan (C/RW) was a healthy scratch for the entire Final.)
- ‡ Exemption granted to engrave the name of a player who did not automatically qualify. (Note: Automatic qualification for a player's name to be engraved on the Stanley Cup: Playing in (for a goaltender, dressing for) at least one Stanley Cup Final game or at least half of regular season games for the Stanley Cup winning team.)

=== Coaching and administrative staff ===
- Philip Anschutz (Owner/Governor), Nancy Anchutz (Owner), Daniel Beckerman (Chief Financial Officer/ Alt. Governor)
- Dean Lombardi (President/General Manager/Alt. Governor), Luc Robitaille (President of Hockey Operations/Alt. Governor), Rob Blake (Vice President/Asst. General Manager), Jeffrey Solomon (Sr. Vice President of Hockey Operations/Legal Affairs)
- Michael Futa (Vice President of Hockey Operations/Director of Player Personnel), Darryl Sutter (Head Coach), John Stevens (Asst. Coach), Davis Payne (Asst. Coach)
- Bill Ranford (Goaltending Coach), Kelly Cheeseman (Chief Operations Officer), Michael Altieri (Vice President of Communications), Jack Ferreira (Special Asst. General Manager)
- Mike O'Connell (Senior Advisor/Development Coach), Nelson Emerson (Player Development Executive), Alyn McCauley (Pro Scout), Mark Yannetti (Amateur Scouting Director)
- Lee Callans (Scouting Operations Director), Tony Gasparini (College Scout), Marshal Dickerson (Director of Team Operations), Zachariah Ziegler (Video Coordinator), Darren Granger (Equipment Manager)
- Chris Kingsley (Athletic Trainer), Dana C. Bryson (Asst. Equipment Manager), Myles Hirayama (Asst. Athletic Trainer)

=== Engraving notes ===
- #55 Jeff Schultz (D) did not play in the regular season, but played in 7 playoff games (none in the Final). He spent most of the regular season in the minors. He was a healthy scratch for the entire Final. As he did not automatically qualify, Los Angeles successfully requested an exemption to engrave his name.
- Mike Richards was again engraved as his full name of Michael.
- Rob Laird, (Sr. Pro Scout), and Ted Fikre (Chief Legal & Development Officer), who were listed on the cup with Los Angeles in 2012, agreed not to have their names engraved in 2014 so that two other scouts could be listed on the Stanley Cup for the first time. Six out of 12 scouts had their name on the Stanley Cup in 2014 (Missing six were Bob Crocker, Bob Friedlander, Bill Gurney, Denis Fugere, Mike Donelly, Christian Ruuttu).
- Canadian Robyn Regehr was the first player born in Brazil to win the Stanley Cup. He lived in Indonesia, before settling in Rosthern, Saskatchewan as a child.
- Edward P. Roski, Jr. (owner) asked that his name not be included, so that another member could get his name on the Stanley Cup (on cup in 2012). He was included in the team picture.
- Ryan Van Asten (Strength and Conditioning Coach), Chris Pikosky (Massage Therapist), Denver Wilson (Asst. Equipment Manager), and Bobby Halfacre (Equipment Asst.) did not have their names engraved on the Stanley Cup, but were included in the team picture.

=== Player notes ===
- Six players on the roster during the Final were left off the Stanley Cup engraving due to not qualifying. None played in or dressed for the playoffs. They were included in the team picture.
  - #24 Colin Fraser (C) – 33 regular season games (name engraved on the Stanley Cup for Los Angeles in 2012 and Chicago in 2010).
  - #57 Linden Vey (RW/C) – 18 regular season games
  - #64 Andy Andreoff (C) – 0 regular season games, 76 for Manchester of the AHL
  - #47 Andrew Bodnarchuk (D) – 0 regular season games, 73 for Manchester of the AHL
  - #35 Jean-Francois Berube (G) – 0 regular season games, 48 for Manchester of the AHL
  - #43 Brayden McNabb (D) – 0 regular season games, 14 for Manchester of the AHL

== Television ==
This was the last year under the League's current Canadian TV contracts with CBC (English broadcasts of the Finals) and the cable network TSN (English broadcasts), and RDS (French broadcasts). The NHL's twelve-year contract with Rogers Communications would then take effect beginning next season, with English-language national coverage of the Finals being sub-licensed to CBC, and French-language telecasts being sub-licensed to TVA Sports. TSN will only be showing regional games for Toronto, Ottawa, and Winnipeg starting the fall of 2014.

In the United States, NBCSN broadcast games three and four, while NBC televised the remaining games. NBC Sports originally planned to repeat its coverage pattern from the last few seasons: NBCSN would televise game two and three, while NBC would broadcast game one, and then games four to seven. After the League scheduled game two on the day of the 2014 Belmont Stakes, coverage of games two and four were switched so NBC's telecast of the horse race would serve as lead-in programming to game two. Due to the death of a family member, NBC lead play-by-play announcer Mike Emrick missed game one. Kenny Albert, who was both NBC's #2 play-by-play announcer and the Rangers radio announcer for WEPN, filled in for Emrick in the first game.

== Quotes ==
Starting back up with it now it’s Martinez in a three on two, Clifford gave it across. It’s held in a shot, save, rebound, SCORE! THE STANLEY CUP! MARTINEZ!

— NBC's Mike Emrick calling Alec Martinez’s game winning goal in the second overtime period of Game 5

== Notes ==
Preceded by Chicago Blackhawks; 2013	Los Angeles Kings; Stanley Cup champions 2014	Succeeded by Chicago Blackhawks; 2015
