= Slava Voynov =

Russian ice hockey player (born 1990)

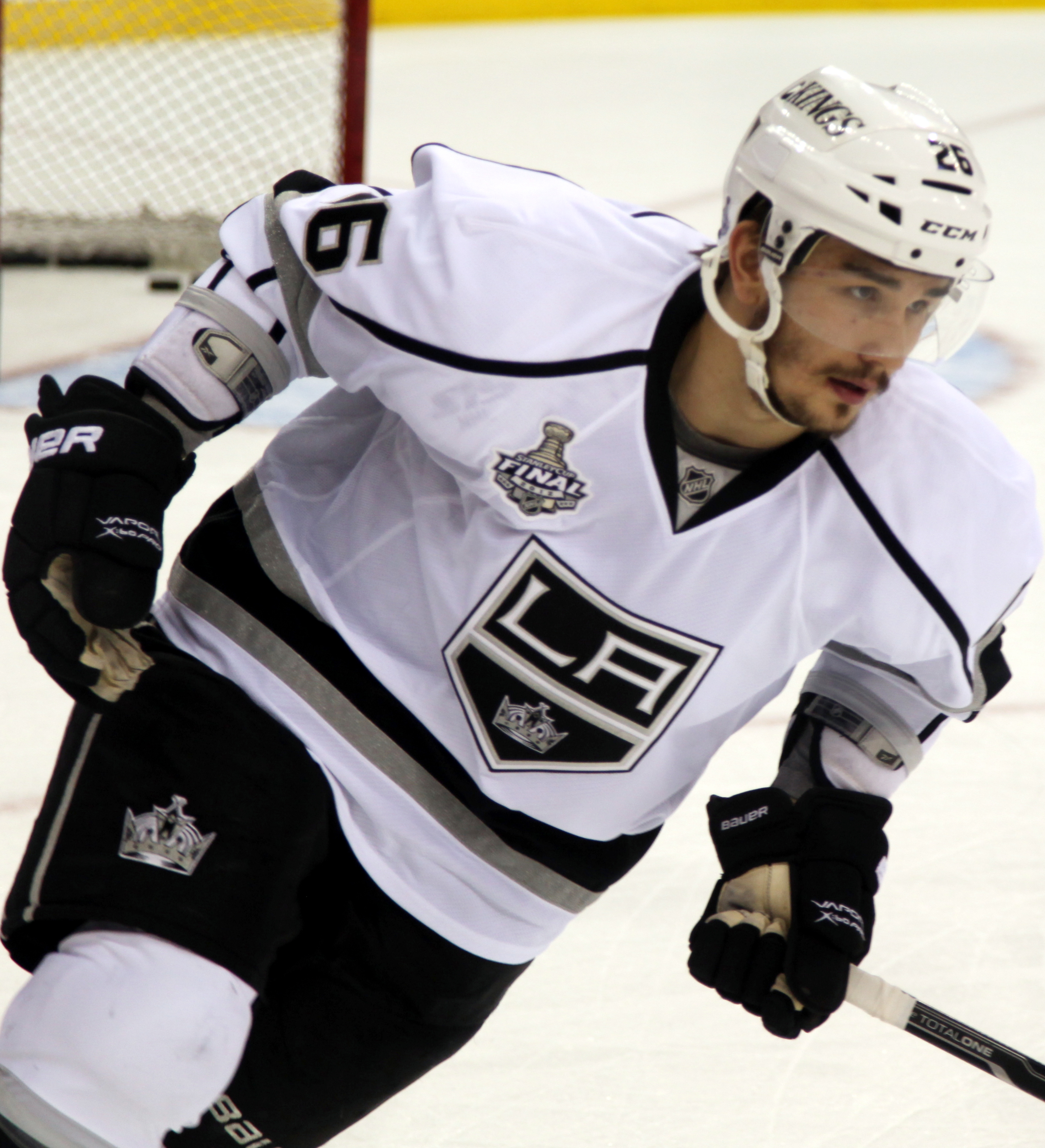
- Voynov with the Los Angeles Kings during the 2012 Stanley Cup Final
- Born: 15 January 1990 (age 36) Chelyabinsk, Russian SFSR, Soviet Union
- Height: 6 ft 0 in (183 cm)
- Weight: 201 lb (91 kg; 14 st 5 lb)
- Position: Defence
- Shoots: Right
- KHL team Former teams: Amur Khabarovsk; Traktor Chelyabinsk; Los Angeles Kings; SKA Saint Petersburg; Avangard Omsk; Dynamo Moscow; Ak Bars Kazan; Torpedo Nizhny Novgorod
- National team: Russia
- NHL draft: 32nd overall, 2008; Los Angeles Kings
- Playing career: 2006–present

Vyacheslav "Slava" Leonidovich Voynov (Russian: Вячесла́в Леони́дович Во́йнов; born 15 January 1990) is a Russian professional ice hockey player who is a defenceman for Amur Khabarovsk of the Kontinental Hockey League (KHL). He was previously suspended by the National Hockey League (NHL) resulting in the Los Angeles Kings terminating Voynov's six-year, $25 million contract in 2015 but retaining his rights. Voynov was selected by the Kings in the second round, 32nd overall, of the 2008 NHL entry draft, having won two Stanley Cups in 2012 and 2014.

== Playing career ==
Voynov began his career with Traktor Chelyabinsk, playing his rookie Russian Superleague (RSL) season in 2006–07. After a second campaign with Traktor, he was selected in the second round, 32nd overall, by the Los Angeles Kings in the 2008 NHL entry draft. The Kings, in their efforts to translate his Cyrillic-scripted name into the Latin alphabet, originally spelled his given name as "Viatcheslav." In the same off-season, Voynov was also drafted fifth overall by the Quebec Major Junior Hockey League (QMJHL)'s Moncton Wildcats in the 2008 Canadian Hockey League (CHL) Import Draft. However, because of his two seasons of professional experience in Russia, Voynov was eligible to forego the junior process in North America, and was subsequently assigned to the Kings' minor league affiliate, the Manchester Monarchs, in the American Hockey League (AHL). He recorded eight goals and 23 points in his AHL rookie season, and in the following campaign, he improved to 29 points in 79 games. In 2011, he was selected to represent the Eastern Conference at the 2011 AHL All-Star Game.

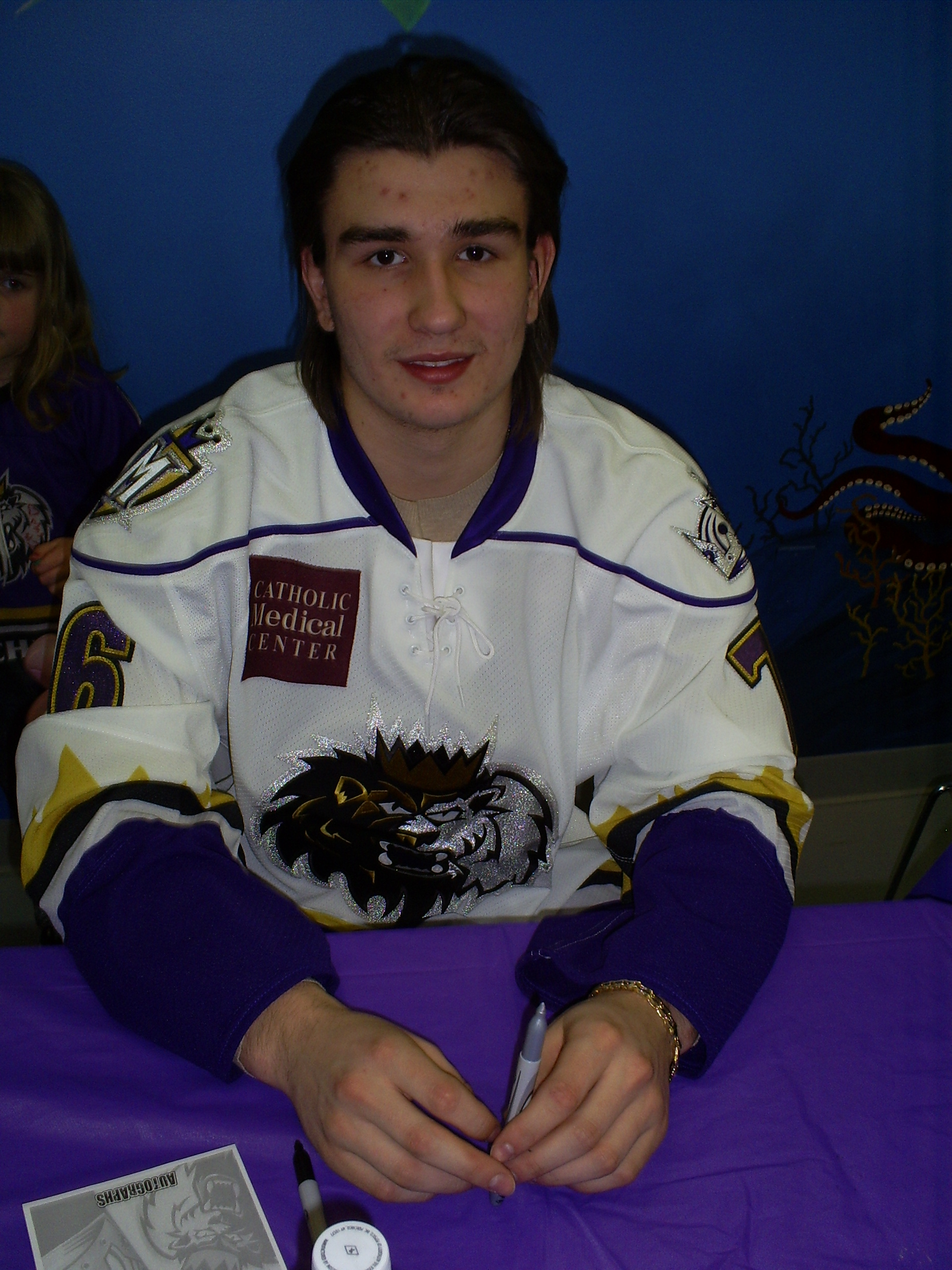
Voynov in February 2009 as a member of the Manchester Monarchs of the AHL

Voynov's first and second career NHL goals were both scored on 27 October 2011, against Kari Lehtonen of the Dallas Stars. On 11 June 2012, Voynov won the Stanley Cup with the Kings in his first NHL season. Voynov had an impressive rookie season with the Kings, but with the 2012–13 NHL season delayed due to a lockout, he was reassigned to Manchester to start the year. In the 2013 Stanley Cup playoffs, Voynov set a new Kings record for number of goals scored by a defenceman in one playoff season, scoring his fifth of the playoffs in game three of the Western Conference final against the Chicago Blackhawks.

On 18 June 2013, in the subsequent off-season, Voynov and the Kings agreed on a six-year, $25 million contract extension worth an annual average value of $4.16 million.

=== Arrest and suspension ===
On 20 October 2014, Voynov was suspended indefinitely pending an investigation by the NHL after being arrested on misdemeanor domestic violence charges against his wife Marta Varlamova. On 20 November 2014, the Los Angeles County prosecutor announced that Voynov would be charged with "one felony count of corporal injury to a spouse with great bodily injury." Although Voynov was indefinitely suspended from the league, the Los Angeles Kings attempted to circumvent that by having Voynov attend a team practice. The Kings were later fined $100,000 for their misdemeanor.

The NHL does not have a policy on domestic violence charges; however, Voynov's suspension was justified under the collective bargaining agreement of the NHL. Although the CBA does not outline cases specific to Voynov and domestic violence, the league is able to suspend players while they are part of a criminal investigation. Under section 18-A.5, "The league may suspend the player pending the league's formal review and disposition of the matter where the failure to suspend the player during this period would create a substantial risk of material harm to the legitimate interests and/or reputation of the league." If convicted, Voynov risked up to nine years in prison and the possibility to be deported back to Russia. Voynov only suited up for six games for the Los Angeles Kings in the 2014–2015 season, but he still received a full salary. Voynov was paid while he was under investigation by the league; however, he was banned from participating in any team activities while serving his suspension.

Voynov pleaded not guilty to the charges of domestic violence on 1 December 2014.

At a hearing on 15 December 2014, an officer testified that Varlamova told police Voynov punched, kicked, and choked her, and that her face was cut after Voynov pushed her into a flat-screen television. The officer also testified to seeing a laceration above Varlamova's left eye, blood streaming, and red marks on her neck. Voynov's attorney claimed that the police misunderstood Varlamova because she does not speak English and maintained she "fell down." On 16 December 2014, TMZ published a letter Varlamova wrote to the Los Angeles County District Attorney asserting that he had not intended to injure her and requesting that Voynov not be charged.

On 2 July 2015, Voynov pleaded no contest to a reduced misdemeanor charge and was sentenced to 90 days in jail. He received three years of probation and was ordered to attend counseling.

On 3 September 2015, Voynov was released from Seal Beach Police Detention Center, where he was being held since 7 July 2015. Upon his release, he was taken into custody by U.S. Immigration and Customs Enforcement (ICE), where they held him at an unspecified detention facility to await trial in front of an immigration judge. Voynov was held without bond, which is common when ICE thinks the subject is a danger to the community or is a flight risk. Voynov elected to return to Russia rather than go through deportation proceedings. As a result, the Kings terminated his contract on 17 September 2015. Voynov was granted dismissal of his misdemeanor domestic abuse conviction on 2 July 2018. The motion was granted the day Voynov's three years of probation ended following his no contest plea to a misdemeanor charge of corporal injury to a spouse in 2015.

=== Return to Russia ===
He returned to Russia and signed a contract with Russian powerhouse club SKA Saint Petersburg, where he won a Gagarin Cup in 2017. On 15 July 2019, he signed a one-year contract with Gagarin Cup finalists, Avangard Omsk.

Having sat out the entirety of the 2018–19 KHL season as a free agent, on 9 April 2019, the NHL announced that Voynov was suspended for the entire 2019–20 season and the 2020 Stanley Cup playoffs. Assuming good behaviour, his eligibility would be restored on 1 July 2020. On 23 May 2019, the NHLPA announced that independent arbitrator Shyam Das had determined Voynov's year-long suspension would be upheld, however he would be credited for time served and would only be suspended for 41 games of the 2019–20 season. Following the arbitration news, the Kings announced they did not have any intention of playing Voynov in the upcoming season and would be looking into cutting ties with him.

He returned to the professional circuit in the KHL, agreeing to a one-year deal with Avangard Omsk on 15 July 2019. In the 2019–20 season, Voynov played on Avangard's top pair leading all blueliners in scoring with 11 goals and 41 points in 59 games, earning his second career selection to the KHL All-Star Game. On 1 May 2020, Voynov left Avangard at the conclusion of his contract.

On 20 May 2021, Voynov opted to continue his career in the KHL, agreeing to a two-year contract with HC Dynamo Moscow.

After leading the blueline in scoring by collecting 31 points through 40 regular season games and posting 10 points in 11 playoff contests, Voynov was traded following the 2021–22 campaign with Vadim Shipachyov to Ak Bars Kazan for financial compensation on 4 May 2022. He was later signed on 18 May 2022 to a three-year contract extension with Ak Bars through 2025.

Following two seasons with Ak Bars, Voynov mutually agreed to leave the club and was later signed to a one-year contract with Torpedo Nizhny Novgorod on 29 July 2024. In the 2024-25 season, Voynov captain Torpedo to the playoffs, notching 6 goals and 22 points through 49 regular season games.

On 25 June 2025, Voynov left Torpedo and returned for a second stint with Avangard Omsk on a one-year contract.

== International play ==
Medal record

Ice hockey

Representing Olympic Athletes from Russia

Olympic Games
Gold medal – first place	2018 Pyeongchang	

Representing ROC

Olympic Games
Silver medal – second place	2022 Beijing	

Representing Russia

World Championships
Bronze medal – third place	2016 Russia	

World Junior Championships
Silver medal – second place	2007 Sweden	
Bronze medal – third place	2008 Czech Republic	
Bronze medal – third place	2009 Canada	

World U18 Championships
Gold medal – first place	2007 Finland	
Silver medal – second place	2008 Russia	

Voynov has played for Russia at the World Under-18 Tournament, the World Junior Tournament, the 2014 Olympics and the 2016 World Championship. He was a member of the Russian team at the 2018 Winter Olympics and won the gold medal.

On 23 January 2022, Voynov was named to the roster to represent Russian Olympic Committee athletes at the 2022 Winter Olympics.

== Career statistics ==
=== Regular season and playoffs ===
			Regular season					Playoffs
Season	Team	League	GP	G	A	Pts	PIM	GP	G	A	Pts	PIM
2005–06	Traktor–2 Chelyabinsk	RUS.3	2	0	0	0	0	—	—	—	—	—
2006–07	Traktor Chelyabinsk	RSL	31	0	0	0	12	—	—	—	—	—
2007–08	Traktor–2 Chelyabinsk	RUS.3	2	1	0	1	0	—	—	—	—	—
2007–08	Traktor Chelyabinsk	RSL	36	1	3	4	20	2	0	0	0	0
2008–09	Manchester Monarchs	AHL	61	8	15	23	46	—	—	—	—	—
2009–10	Manchester Monarchs	AHL	79	10	19	29	43	9	1	3	4	0
2010–11	Manchester Monarchs	AHL	76	15	36	51	36	7	2	3	5	6
2011–12	Manchester Monarchs	AHL	15	2	2	4	4	0	0	0	0	0
2011–12	Los Angeles Kings	NHL	54	8	12	20	12	20	1	2	3	4
2012–13	Manchester Monarchs	AHL	35	7	9	16	22	—	—	—	—	—
2012–13	Los Angeles Kings	NHL	48	6	19	25	14	18	6	7	13	0
2013–14	Los Angeles Kings	NHL	82	4	30	34	44	26	2	7	9	16
2014–15	Los Angeles Kings	NHL	6	0	2	2	2	—	—	—	—	—
2015–16	SKA Saint Petersburg	KHL	23	0	7	7	17	15	0	2	2	6
2016–17	SKA Saint Petersburg	KHL	48	11	26	37	18	—	—	—	—	—
2017–18	SKA Saint Petersburg	KHL	39	9	14	23	18	14	3	3	6	13
2019–20	Avangard Omsk	KHL	59	11	30	41	17	6	0	1	1	0
2021–22	Dynamo Moscow	KHL	40	5	26	31	20	11	5	5	10	8
2022–23	Ak Bars Kazan	KHL	59	11	21	32	24	20	0	9	9	4
2023–24	Ak Bars Kazan	KHL	40	1	13	14	16	5	0	0	0	0
2024–25	Torpedo Nizhny Novgorod	KHL	49	6	16	22	26	4	1	0	1	0
2025–26	Avangard Omsk	KHL	54	6	5	11	16	11	0	0	0	10
NHL totals			190	18	63	81	72	64	9	16	25	20
KHL totals			411	60	158	218	172	86	9	20	29	41

=== International ===
Year	Team	Event	Result	GP	G	A	Pts	PIM
2007	Russia	WJC	2nd place, silver medalist(s)	6	1	0	1	0
2007	Russia	WJC18	1st place, gold medalist(s)	7	1	4	5	2
2007	Russia	IH18	3rd place, bronze medalist(s)	4	0	1	1	6
2008	Russia	WJC	3rd place, bronze medalist(s)	7	0	1	1	0
2008	Russia	WJC18	2nd place, silver medalist(s)	6	1	4	5	2
2009	Russia	WJC	3rd place, bronze medalist(s)	7	1	3	4	0
2014	Russia	OG	5th	5	0	0	0	0
2016	Russia	WC	3rd place, bronze medalist(s)	10	1	2	3	6
2018	OAR	OG	1st place, gold medalist(s)	6	2	4	6	4
2022	ROC	OG	2nd place, silver medalist(s)	6	1	1	2	0
Junior totals				37	4	13	17	10
Senior totals				27	4	7	11	10

== Awards and honors ==
Award	Year
AHL
All-Star Game	2010, 2011
Second All-Star Team	2011
NHL
Stanley Cup champion	2012, 2014
KHL
All-Star Game	2017, 2020
Gagarin Cup	2017
International
U18 All-Star Team	2008
Olympic All-Star Team	2018
