= Kyle Clifford =

Canadian ice hockey player (born 1991)

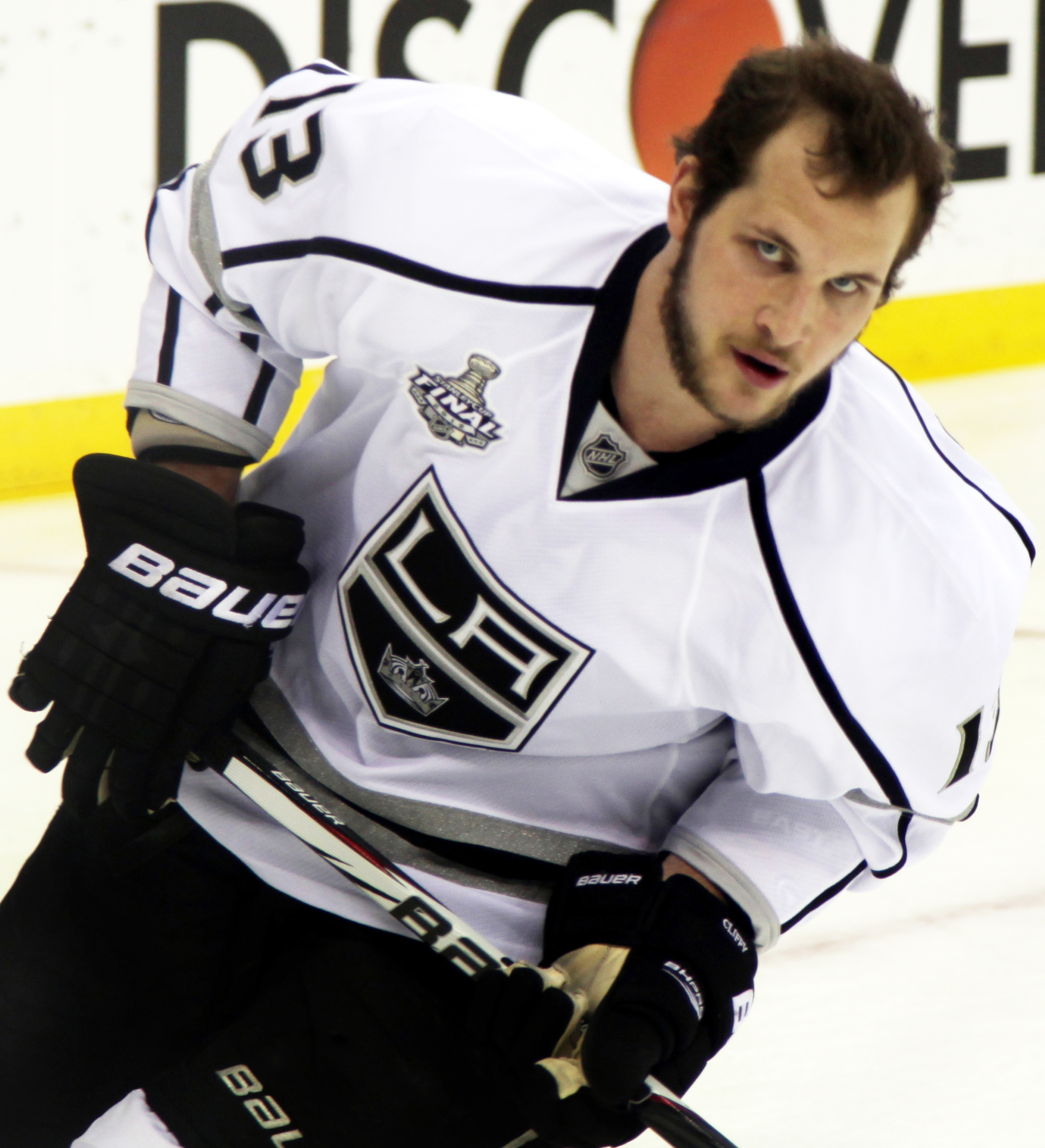
- Clifford with the Los Angeles Kings during the 2012 Stanley Cup Final
- Born: January 13, 1991 (age 35) Ayr, Ontario, Canada
- Height: 6 ft 2 in (188 cm)
- Weight: 211 lb (96 kg; 15 st 1 lb)
- Position: Left wing
- Shot: Left
- Played for: Los Angeles Kings; Toronto Maple Leafs; St. Louis Blues
- NHL draft: 35th overall, 2009; Los Angeles Kings
- Playing career: 2009–2025

Kyle Frank Clifford (born January 13, 1991) is a Canadian former professional ice hockey forward. He was selected by the Los Angeles Kings in the second round (35th overall) of the 2009 NHL entry draft, and spent the majority of his career with the team, though also made appearances with the Toronto Maple Leafs and St. Louis Blues. Clifford is a two-time Stanley Cup champion with the Kings.

== Early life ==
Clifford was born on January 13, 1991, in Ayr, Ontario, Canada. He began playing ice hockey after seeing his older brothers play the sport.

== Playing career ==
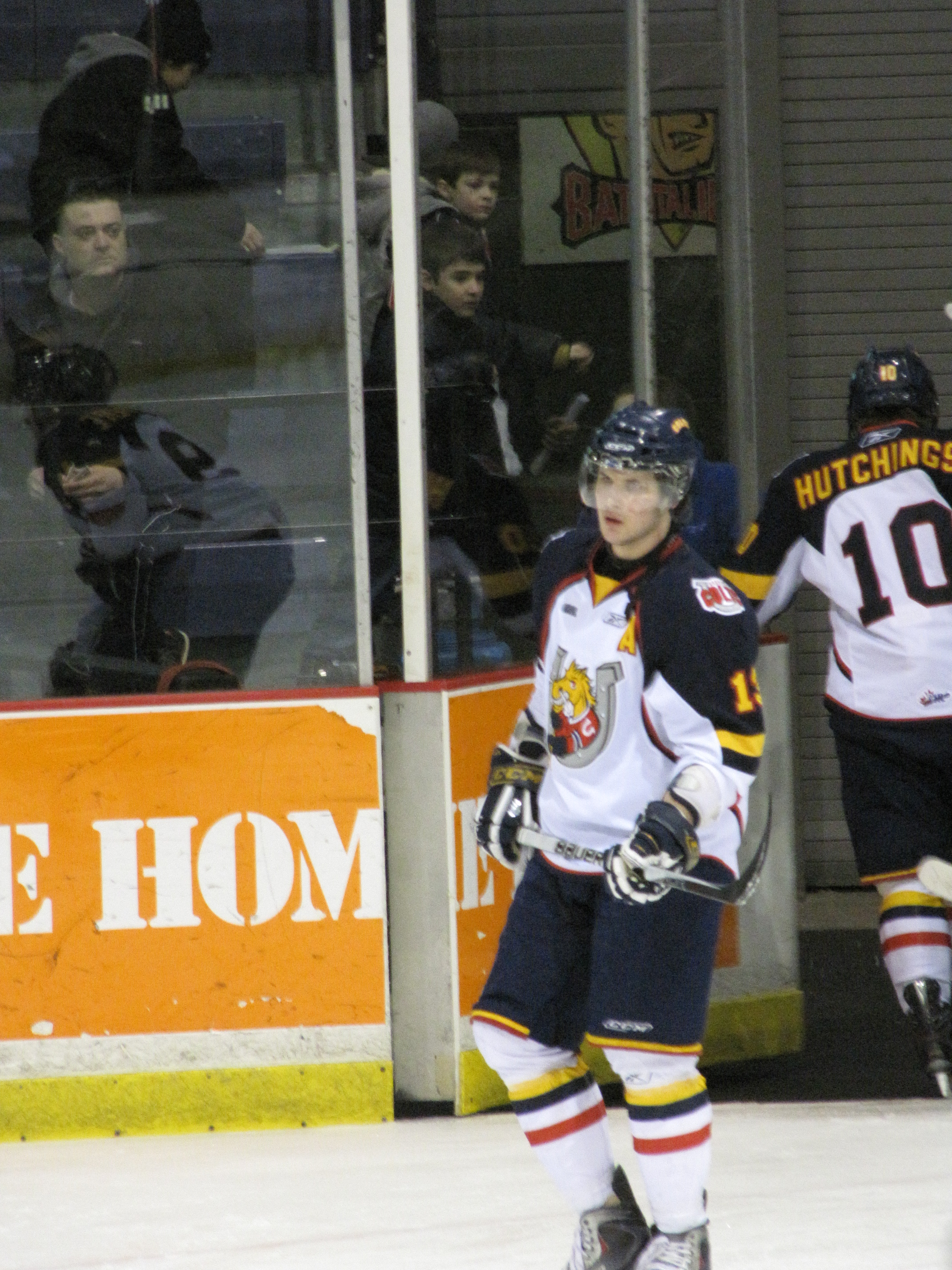
Clifford with the Barrie Colts in 2010

Clifford began his minor hockey career with the Ayr Flames before spending six seasons with Cambridge Minor Hockey. He was eventually drafted by the Barrie Colts of the Ontario Hockey League (OHL).

He spent three seasons with the Colts, amassing 45 goals and 100 points in 184 games, also totaling 327 penalty minutes. During the 2009 NHL entry draft, he was selected in the second round, 35th overall, by the Los Angeles Kings. He was signed to an entry-level contract by the Kings on September 22, 2009. After the 2009–10 season, Clifford joined the Kings' American Hockey League (AHL) affiliate, Manchester Monarchs for the postseason.

=== Los Angeles Kings ===
In 2010, Clifford was among those invited to the Canada men's junior team training camp preparing for the 2010 championship. However, Clifford earned a roster spot with the Kings for the 2010–11 season. On December 9, he scored his first career goal in a 2-1 win over the Calgary Flames. His continued spot on the Kings prevented him from joining Team Canada for the 2010 championships. He primarily played on the fourth line role that could occasionally fight. In his second season, the Kings won the 2012 Stanley Cup, defeating the New Jersey Devils in six games. Clifford only appeared in three postseason games.

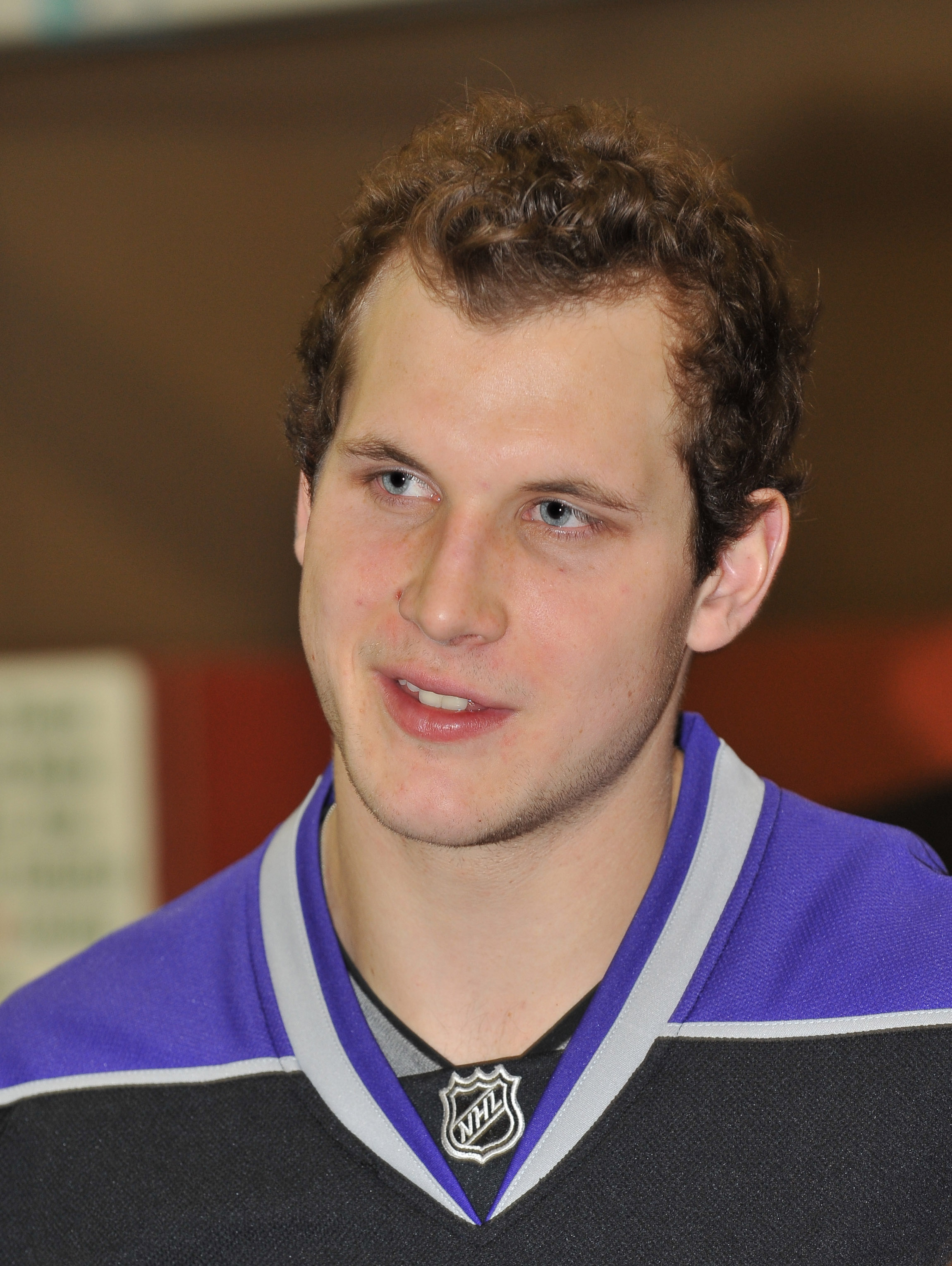
Clifford in 2011.

Clifford joined the Ontario Reign of the ECHL during the 2012–13 NHL lockout, appearing in nine games. He returned to the Kings after the lockout, scoring 7 goals and 14 points in the 2012–13 season and earned a new two-year contract with the Kings at the end of the season. The Kings once again won the Stanley Cup in 2014, defeating the New York Rangers in five games. Clifford (alongside Tyler Toffoli) assisted on the championship-winning goal scored by Alec Martinez in double-overtime. He appeared in 24 postseason games, scoring one goal and seven points. During the 2014–15 season he signed a five-year extension with the Kings.

During the 2018–19 season, while in his ninth season with the Kings, Clifford appeared in 72 games, producing a career high 21 points. His tenure with the team ended on February 5, 2020, as Clifford and Jack Campbell were traded to the Toronto Maple Leafs in exchange for Trevor Moore and third-round picks in 2020 and 2021.

During 7 of his 10 seasons with the Kings, he led the team in penalty minutes, with his rookie season of 141 being his highest total.

=== Toronto Maple Leafs, St. Louis Blues, and retirement ===
He made his Maple Leafs debut on February 7 against the Anaheim Ducks. He scored his first goal with Toronto on February 18, 2020. He finished the season with the one goal and three points in 16 games with the Leafs.

As a free agent from the Maple Leafs, Clifford left to sign a two-year, $2 million contract with the St. Louis Blues on October 11, 2020. In his first season with the Blues, Clifford played in 50 games, registering 4 goals and 7 points. The following season, on November 15, 2021, after appearing in only two games, the Blues placed Clifford on waivers in order to reactivate Oskar Sundqvist, as the team would be $900,000 over the salary cap with him on the roster; Clifford on waivers would clear $1 million in salary cap space and allow the team to become salary cap compliant. Clifford cleared waivers the following day, and a few hours later was traded to the Toronto Maple Leafs in exchange for future considerations. He was assigned to the team's AHL affiliate, the Toronto Marlies. He was recalled from the Marlies on November 23 for the first time, and spent the season bouncing from the Maple Leafs and the Marlies. Clifford played in Game 1 of the 2022 Stanley Cup playoffs for the Maple Leafs against the Tampa Bay Lightning. During the game, Clifford was given a major penalty for boarding Ross Colton and was suspended for the following game. The Leafs were eliminated from the playoffs by the Lightning in seven games.

Clifford spent the majority of the 2022–23 season in the AHL with the Marlies, scoring eight goals and 20 points in 46 games. He also played in two games with the Maple Leafs, going scoreless. He attended the Maple Leafs 2023 training camp, but failed to make the team and was waived. After going unclaimed Clifford was assigned to the Marlies to start the 2023–24 season. Remaining with the Marlies for the duration of the season, Clifford recorded a professional high of 18 assist and 28 points through 53 regular season games.

Having concluded his NHL contract with the Maple Leafs, Clifford opted to continue his tenure with the Marlies by signing as a free agent to a one-year AHL deal for the 2024–25 season on July 31, 2024.

Following his final season with the Marlies, Clifford announced his retirement from professional hockey on August 7, 2025, subsequently taking a player development position with the Maple Leafs' organization.

== Personal life ==
Clifford and his wife Paige have three sons together.

== Career statistics ==
=== Regular season and playoffs ===
			Regular season					Playoffs
Season	Team	League	GP	G	A	Pts	PIM	GP	G	A	Pts	PIM
2007–08	Barrie Colts	OHL	66	1	14	15	83	9	0	1	1	4
2008–09	Barrie Colts	OHL	60	16	12	28	133	5	0	0	0	13
2009–10	Barrie Colts	OHL	58	28	29	57	111	17	5	9	14	28
2009–10	Manchester Monarchs	AHL	—	—	—	—	—	7	0	2	2	12
2010–11	Los Angeles Kings	NHL	76	7	7	14	141	6	3	2	5	7
2011–12	Los Angeles Kings	NHL	81	5	7	12	123	3	0	0	0	2
2012–13	Ontario Reign	ECHL	9	4	3	7	2	—	—	—	—	—
2012–13	Los Angeles Kings	NHL	48	7	7	14	51	14	0	2	2	8
2013–14	Los Angeles Kings	NHL	71	3	5	8	81	24	1	6	7	39
2014–15	Los Angeles Kings	NHL	80	6	9	15	87	—	—	—	—	—
2015–16	Los Angeles Kings	NHL	56	3	6	9	55	4	0	1	1	0
2015–16	Ontario Reign	AHL	2	0	0	0	2	—	—	—	—	—
2016–17	Los Angeles Kings	NHL	73	6	6	12	92	—	—	—	—	—
2017–18	Los Angeles Kings	NHL	50	6	4	10	48	4	0	0	0	6
2018–19	Los Angeles Kings	NHL	72	11	10	21	96	—	—	—	—	—
2019–20	Los Angeles Kings	NHL	53	6	8	14	45	—	—	—	—	—
2019–20	Toronto Maple Leafs	NHL	16	1	2	3	23	5	0	0	0	0
2020–21	St. Louis Blues	NHL	50	4	3	7	30	4	0	1	1	0
2021–22	St. Louis Blues	NHL	2	0	1	1	0	—	—	—	—	—
2021–22	Toronto Marlies	AHL	9	3	0	3	6	—	—	—	—	—
2021–22	Toronto Maple Leafs	NHL	23	1	2	3	31	1	0	0	0	15
2022–23	Toronto Maple Leafs	NHL	2	0	1	1	2	—	—	—	—	—
2022–23	Toronto Marlies	AHL	46	8	12	20	78	7	4	4	8	11
2023–24	Toronto Marlies	AHL	53	10	18	28	140	3	1	3	4	25
2024–25	Toronto Marlies	AHL	17	4	4	8	32	—	—	—	—	—
NHL totals			753	66	78	144	905	65	4	12	16	77

=== International ===
Year	Team	Event	Result	GP	G	A	Pts	PIM
2009	Canada	U18	4th	6	0	0	0	16
Junior totals				6	0	0	0	16

== Awards and honours ==
Award	Year
NHL
Stanley Cup champion	2012, 2014
