= Dwight King =

Canadian ice hockey player (born 1989)

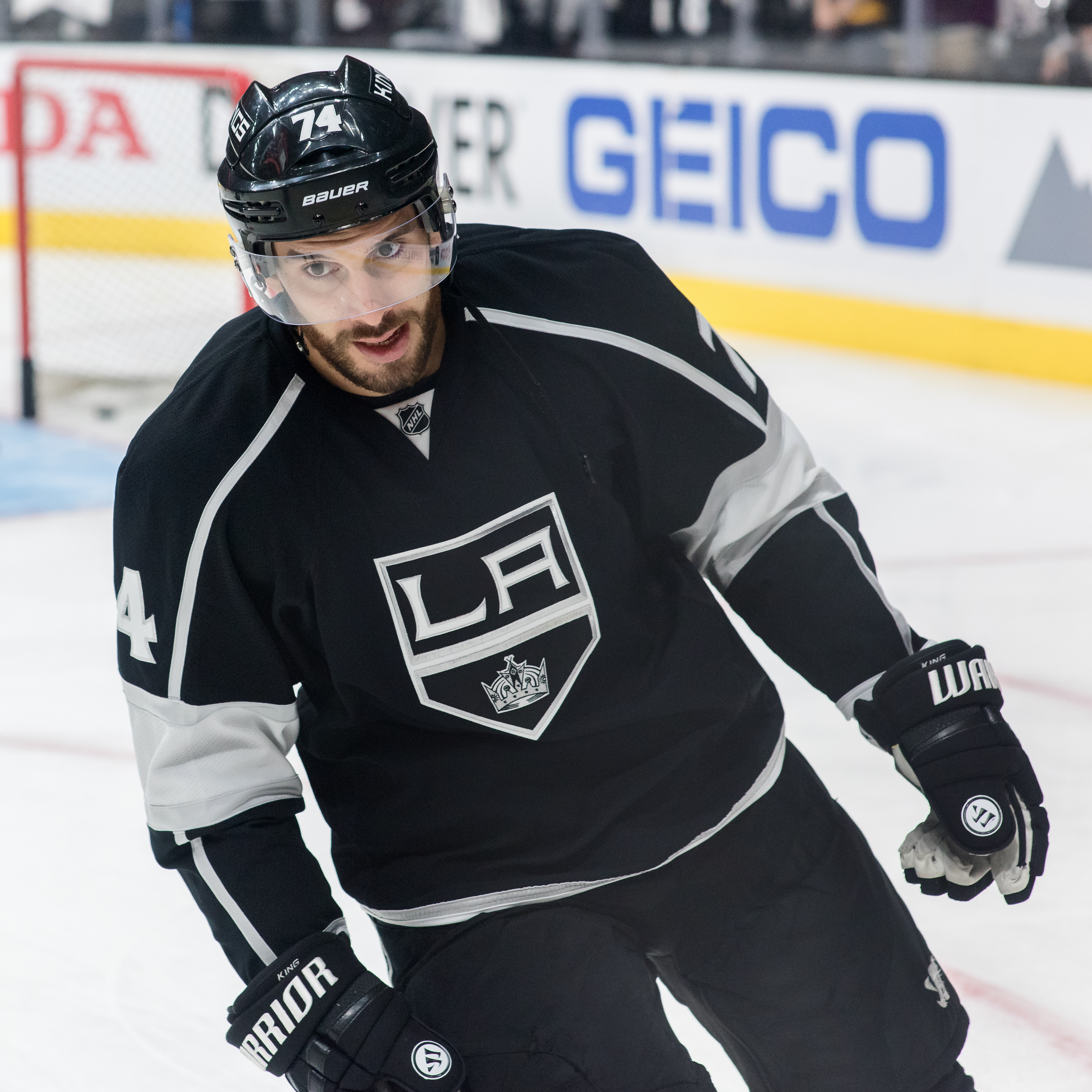
- King with the Los Angeles Kings in April 2016
- Born: July 5, 1989 (age 37) Meadow Lake, Saskatchewan, Canada
- Height: 6 ft 4 in (193 cm)
- Weight: 229 lb (104 kg; 16 st 5 lb)
- Position: Left wing
- Shot: Left
- Played for: Los Angeles Kings; Montreal Canadiens; Avtomobilist Yekaterinburg; Graz99ers
- NHL draft: 109th overall, 2007; Los Angeles Kings
- Playing career: 2009–2020

Dwight King (born July 5, 1989) is a Canadian former professional ice hockey left winger. He was selected in the fourth round, 109th overall, by the Los Angeles Kings of the National Hockey League (NHL) in the 2007 NHL entry draft and was a member of the Kings' Stanley Cup championship teams in 2012 and 2014, and also played for the Montreal Canadiens.

== Playing career ==
=== Los Angeles Kings ===
King was drafted 109th overall in the 2007 NHL entry draft by the Los Angeles Kings. He spent five seasons with the Lethbridge Hurricanes (spanning from 2004–05 to 2008–09) in the Western Hockey League (WHL).

King made his professional debut during the 2009–10 season, playing 20 games in the ECHL with the Ontario Reign, and the remainder of the regular season and playoffs with the Kings' American Hockey League (AHL) affiliate, the Manchester Monarchs.

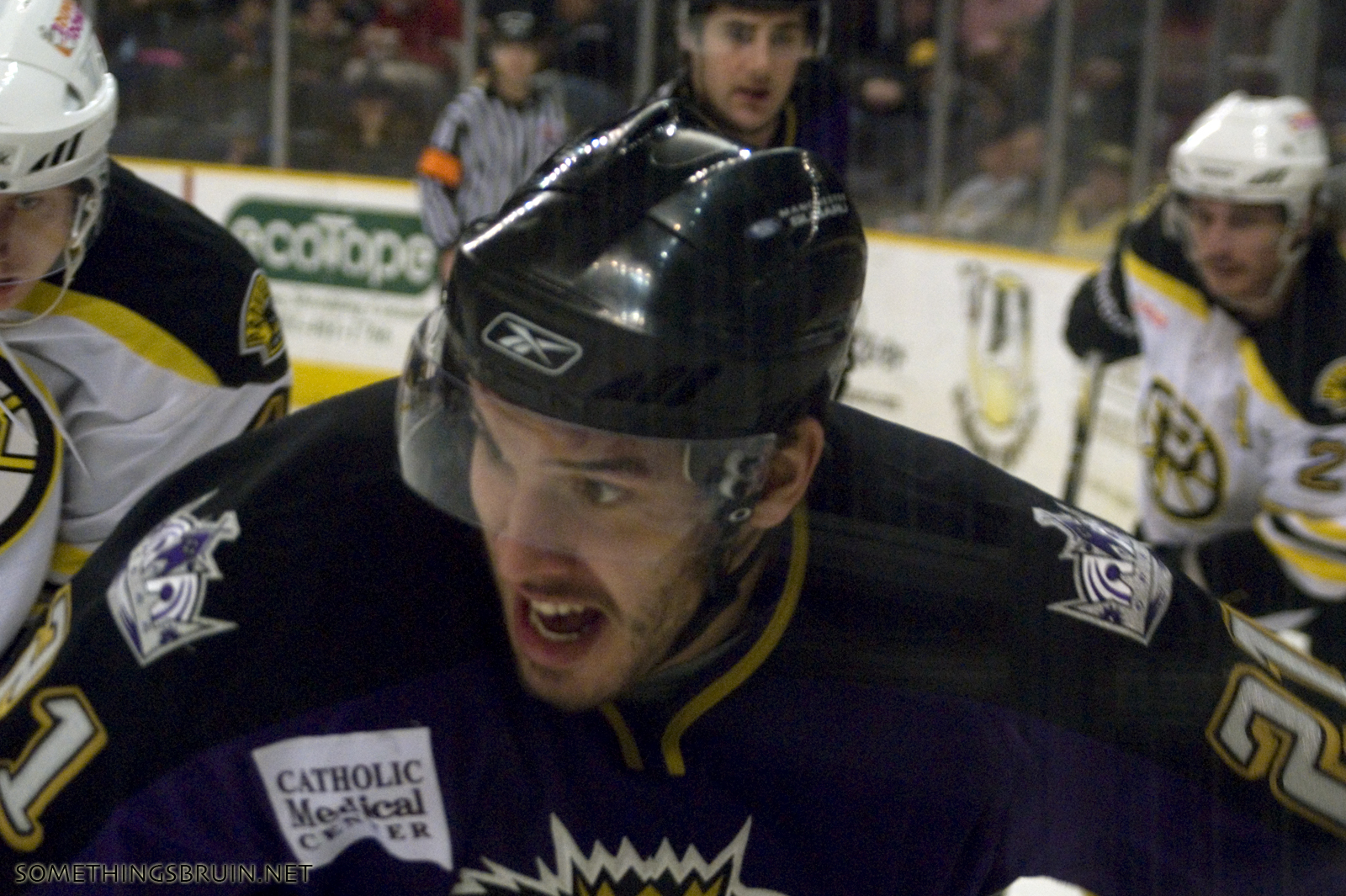
King with the Manchester Monarchs in January 2011.

King remained with Manchester for the beginning of the 2010–11 AHL season before being recalled to the NHL by Los Angeles on November 16, 2010 to replace the injured Alexei Ponikarovsky on their active roster. On November 17, 2010 he played in his first NHL game when he suited up with the Kings for a home game against the Columbus Blue Jackets.

On February 12, 2012, King scored his first career National Hockey League goal against the Dallas Stars. He went on to score five goals with three assists in 20 games during the 2012 Stanley Cup playoffs as the Kings won their first ever Stanley Cup championship.

On October 24, 2013, King completed his first ever National Hockey League hat trick against the Phoenix Coyotes. King won his second Stanley Cup when the Kings defeated the New York Rangers on June 13, 2014. Appearing in 26 games during the 2014 Stanley Cup Playoffs, King scored three goals and eight assists.

On July 30, 2014, King and the Los Angeles Kings avoided arbitration by agreeing to a three-year contract worth $5.95 million. He scored 13 goals to go with 13 assists for the Kings during the 2014–15 NHL Season. His production would soon decline in subsequent seasons, scoring 7 goals in 2015–16, and 8 in 2016–17.

=== Montreal Canadiens ===
On March 1, 2017, King was traded to the Montreal Canadiens for a conditional 2018 fourth-round draft pick. Continuing to play his role as a fourth-line fixture, King registered 1 goal in 17 games to end the regular season. He went scoreless in 6 playoff games with the Canadiens before leaving as a free agent.

=== Europe ===
On August 14, 2017, King signed his first contract overseas, agreeing to a two-year deal with Avtomobilist Yekaterinburg of the Kontinental Hockey League (KHL). Following the 2017–18 season, in which he contributed with 6 goals and 14 points in 49 games, King was released from the remaining year of his contract with Yekaterinburg and signed with the Graz 99ers of the Austrian Hockey League (EBEL) on August 3, 2018.

== Personal life ==
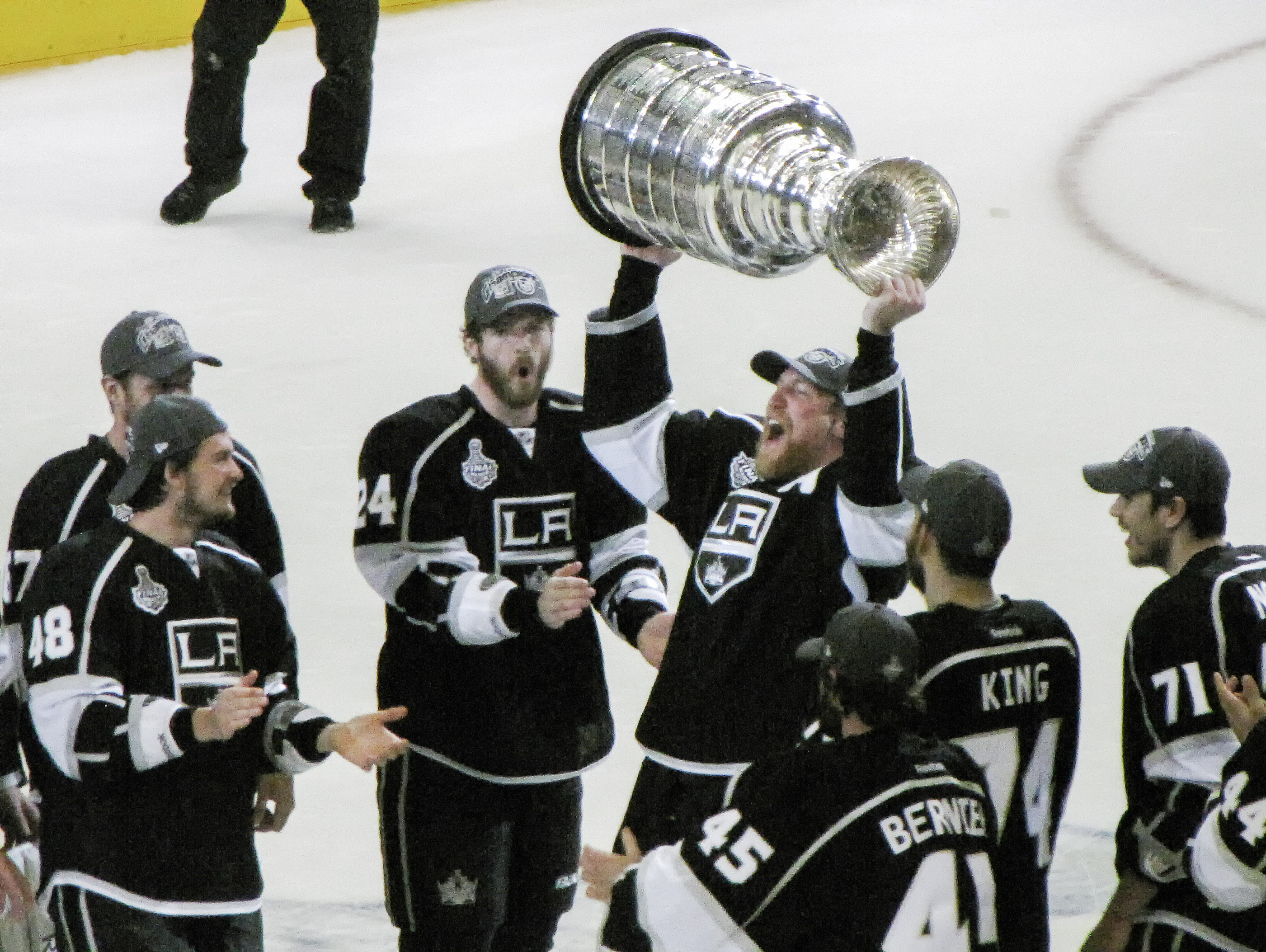
King (74) celebrates with teammates during their 2012 Cup Final victory.

King is of Métis heritage. His older brother D. J. King also played professional hockey. King played minor hockey in Saskatchewan for the Beardy's Blackhawks. The team King played on is the only program in Canada run by and based in a First Nations reserve. Despite being run by a reserve, the team was not completely made up of First Nations people; King estimated the team was approximately 50 percent First Nations. King's hometown is Meadow Lake, Saskatchewan, where he resides during the summers. He shared the 2014 Stanley Cup that he won with the Los Angeles Kings in Saskatchewan, with his wife Lauren and daughter, Grace.

His mother Donna is a secretary and his father Dwayne is a truck driver.

King has started to venture into operating an indoor golf course in Meadow Lake called Kingdom Golf.

== Career statistics ==
=== Regular season and playoffs ===
			Regular season					Playoffs
Season	Team	League	GP	G	A	Pts	PIM	GP	G	A	Pts	PIM
2004–05	Lethbridge Hurricanes	WHL	7	0	0	0	2	0	0	0	0	2
2005–06	Lethbridge Hurricanes	WHL	68	8	8	16	22	6	0	0	0	6
2006–07	Lethbridge Hurricanes	WHL	62	12	32	44	39	—	—	—	—	—
2007–08	Lethbridge Hurricanes	WHL	72	34	35	69	56	19	8	6	14	12
2008–09	Lethbridge Hurricanes	WHL	64	25	35	60	51	11	1	7	8	2
2009–10	Ontario Reign	ECHL	20	4	5	9	9	—	—	—	—	—
2009–10	Manchester Monarchs	AHL	52	10	16	26	42	16	2	7	9	4
2010–11	Manchester Monarchs	AHL	72	24	28	52	58	7	2	3	5	2
2010–11	Los Angeles Kings	NHL	6	0	0	0	2	—	—	—	—	—
2011–12	Manchester Monarchs	AHL	50	11	18	29	20	—	—	—	—	—
2011–12	Los Angeles Kings	NHL	27	5	9	14	10	20	5	3	8	13
2012–13	Manchester Monarchs	AHL	28	5	12	17	13	—	—	—	—	—
2012–13	Los Angeles Kings	NHL	47	4	6	10	11	18	2	3	5	2
2013–14	Los Angeles Kings	NHL	77	15	15	30	18	26	3	8	11	20
2014–15	Los Angeles Kings	NHL	81	13	13	26	21	—	—	—	—	—
2015–16	Los Angeles Kings	NHL	47	7	6	13	24	5	0	1	1	2
2016–17	Los Angeles Kings	NHL	63	8	7	15	10	—	—	—	—	—
2016–17	Montreal Canadiens	NHL	17	1	0	1	2	6	0	0	0	0
2017–18	Avtomobilist Yekaterinburg	KHL	49	6	8	14	12	3	0	1	1	4
2018–19	Graz 99ers	EBEL	54	10	32	42	16	10	1	2	3	0
2019–20	Graz99ers	EBEL	26	6	8	14	8	—	—	—	—	—
NHL totals			365	53	56	109	98	75	10	15	25	37

=== International ===
Year	Team	Event	Result	GP	G	A	Pts	PIM
2005	Canada Western	U17	1st place, gold medalist(s)	6	0	0	0	0
2006	Canada Western	U17	7th	5	0	5	5	6
2006	Canada	IH18	1st place, gold medalist(s)	4	0	0	0	0
Junior totals				15	0	5	5	6

== Awards and honors ==
Award	Year
NHL
Stanley Cup champion	2012, 2014
