= Don Meehan =

Canadian hockey player agent

Donald E. Meehan (born April 10, 1951) is a Canadian National Hockey League Players' Association (NHLPA) hockey player agent.

== Early career ==
Meehan earned his bachelor's degree at Sir George Williams University. At McGill University, during his final year of law school, Meehan played for the Redmen as a wide receiver under coach Charlie Baillie.

After earning his law degree (LLB 1975) at McGill, Meehan was hired by Toronto law firm Blaney, Pasternak. Most of the cases he originally dealt with were corporate and tax-related. The firm also had some ice hockey players as clientele.

== Newport Sports Management ==
Declining the offer of a partnership from his law firm, Meehan decided in 1981 to create his own company that focused on hockey players. Named Newport Sports Management Inc. and operated in a partnership with fellow agent Pat Morris, it represents over 100 NHL players.

Instead of approaching players that are already in the National Hockey League (NHL), Meehan approached the families of young talents before they were drafted by the NHL. One of the first young talents Meehan was an agent for was the talented centre Pat LaFontaine—LaFontaine hired Meehan a few months before he entered the 1983 NHL entry draft.

== Current NHL clients ==
- Justin Abdelkader, Detroit Red Wings
- Josh Bailey, New York Islanders
- Jay Beagle, Arizona Coyotes
- Tyler Bozak, free agent
- Cal Clutterbuck, New York Islanders
- Matt Cullen, Minnesota Wild
- Michael Del Zotto, Vancouver Canucks
- Drew Doughty, Los Angeles Kings
- Jordan Eberle, Seattle Kraken
- Jonathan Ericsson, Detroit Red Wings
- Justin Falk, Buffalo Sabres
- Nick Foligno, Boston Bruins
- Travis Hamonic, Vancouver Canucks
- Patric Hörnqvist, Florida Panthers
- Erik Karlsson, San Jose Sharks
- Evander Kane, Edmonton Oilers
- Phil Kessel, Arizona Coyotes
- Robin Lehner, Vegas Golden Knights
- Trevor Lewis, Calgary Flames
- Derek MacKenzie, Florida Panthers
- Matt Martin, New York Islanders
- Shawn Matthias, Winnipeg Jets
- Chris Mueller, Toronto Maple Leafs
- James Neal, free agent
- Cal O'Reilly, Minnesota Wild
- Ryan O'Reilly, St. Louis Blues
- Zach Parise, New York Islanders
- Jeff Petry, Pittsburgh Penguins
- Corey Perry, Tampa Bay Lightning
- Alex Pietrangelo, Vegas Golden Knights
- Kyle Quincey, Minnesota Wild
- Brad Richardson, Calgary Flames
- Luke Schenn, Vancouver Canucks
- Steven Stamkos, Tampa Bay Lightning
- P. K. Subban, free agent
- Brandon Sutter, Vancouver Canucks
- Matt Taormina, Montreal Canadiens
- Matthew Tkachuk, Calgary Flames
- Mats Zuccarello, Minnesota Wild

=== Current and former clients active outside the NHL ===
- Luke Adam, Adler Mannheim
- Keith Aulie, EHC Red Bull München
- Drayson Bowman, Colorado Eagles
- Darryl Boyce, Düsseldorfer EG
- Dustin Boyd, Dynamo Moscow
- Mike Brodeur, free agent
- Troy Brouwer, free agent
- Brett Carson, SaiPa
- Matt Corrente, free agent
- Nikita Filatov, HC Neftekhimik Nizhnekamsk
- Alexander Frolov, Amur Khabarovsk
- Nicklas Grossmann, Södertälje SK
- Matthew Halischuk, free agent
- Martin Hanzal, free agent
- Jarome Iginla, free agent
- Ryan Jones, Kölner Haie
- Andrei Kostitsyn, Kunlun Red Star
- Sergei Kostitsyn, HC Dinamo Minsk
- Maxim Lapierre, HC Lugano
- Chad LaRose, Orlando Solar Bears
- Brandon McMillan, Dinamo Riga
- Brendan Mikkelson, Luleå HF
- Kris Newbury, Fischtown Pinguins
- Dion Phaneuf, free agent
- Mike Ribeiro, free agent
- Mike Richards, free agent
- Mike Santorelli, Genève-Servette HC
- James Sheppard, Eisbären Berlin
- Nick Spaling, Genève-Servette HC
- Viktor Stalberg, EV Zug
- Henrik Tallinder, free agent
- Jordin Tootoo, free agent
- Tom Wandell, Örebro HK
- Jeremy Williams, Straubing Tigers
- Ryan Wilson, KalPa
- Nolan Yonkman, JYP

=== Retired clients formerly in the NHL ===
- Colby Armstrong
- Jason Arnott
- Alex Auld
- Todd Bertuzzi
- Paul Bissonnette
- Francis Bouillon
- Tim Brent
- Eric Brewer
- Patrice Brisebois
- Ilya Bryzgalov
- Gregory Campbell
- Luca Caputi
- Dan Carcillo
- Erik Christensen
- Wendel Clark
- David Clarkson
- Mike Commodore
- Matt Cooke
- Ryan Craig
- Matt Ellis
- Steve Eminger
- John Erskine
- Tim Gleason
- Matt Greene
- Scott Hannan
- Josh Harding
- Derian Hatcher
- Kristian Huselius
- Pat LaFontaine
- Mike Johnson
- Curtis Joseph
- Ed Jovanovski
- Pascal Leclaire
- Brian Lee
- David Legwand
- Nicklas Lidström
- Trevor Linden
- Al MacInnis
- Dave Manson
- Brad May
- Jay McKee
- Fredrik Modin
- Travis Moen
- Ethan Moreau
- Evgeni Nabokov
- Scott Niedermayer
- Eric Nystrom
- Patrick O'Sullivan
- Nathan Oystrick
- Michael Peca
- Chris Pronger
- Brandon Prust
- Wade Redden
- Brad Richards
- Craig Rivet
- Bryan Rodney
- Mike Sillinger
- Steve Staios
- Matt Stajan
- Jarret Stoll
- Jason Strudwick
- Brent Sutter
- Andy Sutton
- Danny Syvret
- José Théodore
- Ole-Kristian Tollefsen
- Mike Van Ryn
- Scott Walker
- Stephen Weiss
- Jeff Woywitka

=== Previous and now former NHL clients ===
- Alexander Ovechkin, Washington Capitals
- Nik Antropov, Atlanta Thrashers , Andy Strickland, June 19, 2009.

== Other notable clients ==
- Ron MacLean, Host of Hockey Night in Canada
- Vladislav Tretiak, Former Soviet national and CSKA Moscow goaltender, Goaltender consultant for the Chicago Blackhawks

== See also ==
- David Falk, an NBA agent.
- Scott Boras, a Major League Baseball agent.

== General references ==
- Who's who: player agents
- Newport Sports Management Inc.
- Playing the Game: Don Meehan Win Respect and Top Salaries
- Oilers regret having to trade Ryan Smyth
- Hab's Perezhogin signs with Russian team
- Markov Inks Four-Year Deal With Habs
- Sutter Silent on Coach, Player Contracts
- Avalanche adds a true warrior in Ryan Smyth
- Buffalo Sabres re-sign Maxim Afinogenov to multi-year contract
- In the Spotlight: Stoll dominates faceoffs for Oilers
- The Stanley Cup: Adams savors his Stanley Cup experience
- Sundin hard to fit under salary cap
- Capitals' Ovechkin Fires Agent Meehan
