= 2012 Stanley Cup Final =

2012 ice hockey championship series

	1	2	3	4	5	6	Total
Los Angeles Kings	2*	2*	4	1	1	6	4
New Jersey Devils	1*	1*	0	3	2	1	2
- * – Denotes overtime period(s)
- Location(s): Los Angeles: Staples Center (3, 4, 6); Newark: Prudential Center (1, 2, 5)
- Coaches: Los Angeles: Darryl Sutter; New Jersey: Peter DeBoer
- Captains: Los Angeles: Dustin Brown; New Jersey: Zach Parise
- National anthems: Los Angeles: Pia Toscano; New Jersey: Arlette Roxburgh
- Referees: Dan O'Halloran (1, 3, 5); Dan O'Rourke (2, 4, 6); Chris Rooney (2, 4, 6); Brad Watson (1, 3, 5)
- Dates: May 30 – June 11, 2012
- MVP: Jonathan Quick (Kings)
- Series-winning goal: Jeff Carter (12:45, first)
- Hall of Famers: Devils: Martin Brodeur (2018)
- Networks: Canada: (English): CBC (French): RDS; United States: (English): NBC (1–2, 5–6), NBCSN (3–4)
- Announcers: (CBC) Jim Hughson, Craig Simpson, and Glenn Healy (RDS) Pierre Houde and Marc Denis (NBC/NBCSN) Mike Emrick, Eddie Olczyk, and Pierre McGuire (NHL International) Dave Strader and Joe Micheletti

The 2012 Stanley Cup Final was the championship series of the National Hockey League's (NHL) 2011–12 season, and the culmination of the 2012 Stanley Cup playoffs. The Western Conference playoff champion Los Angeles Kings defeated the Eastern Conference playoff champion New Jersey Devils four games to two, capturing the first Stanley Cup title in the team's 45-year history, dealing the Devils just their second Stanley Cup Final defeat in five tries and first since 2001. Kings goaltender Jonathan Quick was awarded the Conn Smythe Trophy as the Most Valuable Player of the playoffs.

The Los Angeles Kings made their second appearance in the Final in franchise history, having lost in their previous appearance to the Montreal Canadiens in five games in 1993. The New Jersey Devils last appeared in 2003, when they defeated the then-Mighty Ducks of Anaheim in seven games to win their third Stanley Cup title. It was the first championship series since 2007 whose Stanley Cup-clinching game was played on the winning team's home ice.

The Eastern Conference winner had home ice advantage for the first time since 2006, since the Devils had a better regular season record than the Kings. The Devils finished the regular season as the sixth seed in the Eastern Conference, making them the lowest-seeded team to have home-ice advantage in the Stanley Cup Final, a record previously held by the Devils when they won the Cup as a fourth seed in 2000. With the Devils entering the playoffs as the ninth seed of the sixteen playoff teams by regular season record (no division titles) and the Kings as the thirteenth, their combined seed of twenty-two was the second highest of any playoff matchup (only trailing the 1991 Cup Final with twenty-three), and it was the first playoff matchup with no team seeded better than ninth. The Kings became the first eighth-seeded team in North American sports history to win a championship, as well as the only eighth-seeded team to win the Stanley Cup as of 2026.

== Paths to the Final ==
=== Los Angeles Kings ===
The Los Angeles Kings historically had not fared well in the postseason, having only progressed beyond the second round of the playoffs once in franchise history. There were some highlights in franchise history, such as a dramatic seven-game series loss to the heavily favoured Boston Bruins in 1976, the upset of the top seeded Edmonton Oilers (including the game three Miracle on Manchester) in 1982, a comeback from a 3–1 series deficit to beat the defending Stanley Cup champion Oilers in 1989, and an upset of a second-seeded Detroit Red Wings team in 2001 often referred to as the "Frenzy on Figueroa." The first time that they advanced to the Western Conference Final was in 1993, where the Kings defeated the Toronto Maple Leafs in seven games to reach their first Cup Final in franchise history, where they lost to the Montreal Canadiens in five games. From 1994 to 2011 the Kings won just one playoff series in 2001 against the aforementioned Red Wings team and coming back from a 3–1 deficit to push the eventual Stanley Cup champion Colorado Avalanche to seven games.

The Kings started the regular season at 13–12–4 before firing head coach Terry Murray on December 12, 2011. John Stevens served as interim coach before the team hired Darryl Sutter on December 20. Under Sutter, the Kings finished the season at 95 points. The Kings lost their final two regular season games to fall from first place in the Pacific Division (and the #3 seed in the West) to third place in the division and eighth in the conference. The Kings won only 40 out 82 games, and with 95 points became the first losing record team to finish the season with more than 90 points.

The Kings then went on to become the second team to eliminate the first, second and third seeds from the playoffs in the same postseason (and the first team to do so in that order), after the 2003–04 Calgary Flames, also coached by Darryl Sutter, eliminating the back-to-back Presidents' Trophy-winning Vancouver Canucks in five games, the second-seeded St. Louis Blues in a four game sweep, and the third-seeded Phoenix Coyotes in five games. In addition, the Kings went a perfect 8–0 on the road in these playoff games and the first team to go undefeated while en route to the Final.

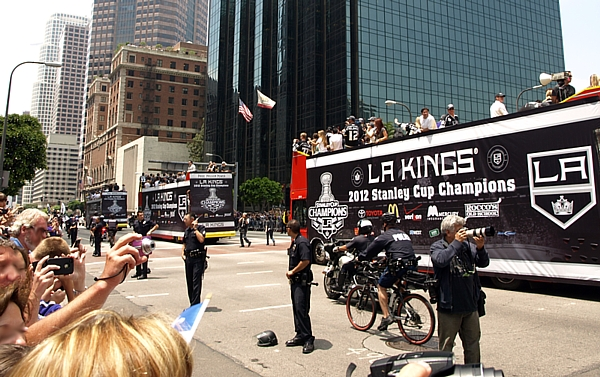
The Kings' 2012 Stanley Cup victory parade in downtown Los Angeles.

The Kings became the second eighth seed to reach the Final, following the Edmonton Oilers in 2006 (the Oilers lost out to the Carolina Hurricanes in seven games). Kings players Jarret Stoll and Matt Greene were part of that Oilers team in 2006, while teammate Justin Williams played for the Cup-winning Hurricanes.

=== New Jersey Devils ===
The Devils started the season having missed the playoffs in the 2010–11 season for the first time since 1995–96 season, breaking a 13-year consecutive postseason appearance streak. This was the Devils' first season under head coach Peter DeBoer, who replaced the retiring Jacques Lemaire during the off-season. Under DeBoer, New Jersey finished the regular season with 102 points, but ended up with the sixth seed in the Eastern Conference playoffs.

The Devils eliminated DeBoer's former team, the Southeast division-winning Florida Panthers, in seven games, and two of their division rivals, first the fifth-seeded Philadelphia Flyers in five games, and the first-seeded New York Rangers in six games.

== Game summaries ==
Number in parentheses represents the player's total in goals or assists to that point of the entire four rounds of the playoffs

=== Game one ===
May 30	Los Angeles Kings	2–1	OT	New Jersey Devils	Prudential Center	Recap

Los Angeles scored first on Colin Fraser's goal at 9:56 of the first period. The Kings then held the Devils without a shot on goal for the first 14 minutes of the second period, but could not increase their lead. The Devils tied the game at 18:48 of the second period when Anton Volchenkov's shot bounced off of Kings defenceman Slava Voynov and into the Los Angeles net. At 3:58 of the third period, a Devils goal was waved off when Zach Parise illegally pushed the puck with his hand over the Kings goal line. Anže Kopitar beat Martin Brodeur on a breakaway goal 8:13 into overtime to give the Kings a 2–1 win in game one.

With the win, the Kings became the first team to win their first nine road games in a single postseason.

Scoring summary
Period	Team	Goal	Assist(s)	Time	Score
1st	LAK	Colin Fraser (1)	Jordan Nolan (1)	09:56	1–0 LAK
2nd	NJD	Anton Volchenkov (1)	Patrik Eliáš (3) and David Clarkson (8)	18:48	1–1
3rd	None				
OT	LAK	Anže Kopitar (7)	Justin Williams (10) and Drew Doughty (9)	08:13	2–1 LAK
Penalty summary
Period	Team	Player	Penalty	Time	PIM
1st	LAK	Dustin Brown	Goaltender interference	12:19	2:00
2nd	LAK	Jarret Stoll	Tripping	08:31	2:00
2nd	NJD	Dainius Zubrus	Elbowing	13:23	2:00
3rd	None				
OT	None				

Shots by period
Team	1	2	3	OT	Total
LAK	5	9	8	3	25
NJD	5	4	7	2	18

=== Game two ===
June 2	Los Angeles Kings	2–1	OT	New Jersey Devils	Prudential Center	Recap

The Kings extended their 2012 playoff road winning streak to ten with another 2–1 overtime victory. This time, it was Jeff Carter who scored at 13:42 of the extra period. After Carter's initial shot from the right side was stopped, he then went around the net to grab the puck on the other side and then made a shot through traffic that beat Martin Brodeur. Los Angeles scored first on Drew Doughty's unassisted goal at 7:49 of the first period. The Devils tied the game at 2:59 of the third period when Ryan Carter deflected Marek Židlický's shot into the Kings' net. Neither team could take advantage of their power plays, nor on a 4-on-4 late in the third period. Both teams had more shots than game one; Jonathan Quick made 32 out of 33 saves, while Brodeur made 30 out of 32.

Scoring summary
Period	Team	Goal	Assist(s)	Time	Score
1st	LAK	Drew Doughty (3)	Unassisted	07:49	1–0 LAK
2nd	None				
3rd	NJD	Ryan Carter (5)	Marek Židlický (8) and Steve Bernier (5)	02:59	1–1
OT	LAK	Jeff Carter (5)	Dustin Penner (8) and Alec Martinez (2)	13:42	2–1 LAK
Penalty summary
Period	Team	Player	Penalty	Time	PIM
1st	LAK	Matt Greene	Cross Checking	02:54	2:00
1st	LAK	Willie Mitchell	Cross-checking	07:56	2:00
2nd	NJD	Andy Greene	Tripping	09:29	2:00
2nd	LAK	Dwight King	High-sticking	13:38	2:00
3rd	NJD	Dainius Zubrus	Interference	16:55	2:00
3rd	LAK	Drew Doughty	Hooking	17:46	2:00
OT	None				

Shots by period
Team	1	2	3	OT	Total
LAK	6	9	6	11	32
NJD	11	9	10	3	33

=== Game three ===
June 4	New Jersey Devils	0–4	Los Angeles Kings	Staples Center	Recap

Los Angeles scored four goals, and Jonathan Quick stopped all 22 New Jersey shots, as the Kings defeated the Devils 4–0. The Kings' first goal at 5:58 of the second period was controversial. Dwight King's original shot against Martin Brodeur was stopped, but King kept on swiping the puck until Alec Martinez finally pushed it across the goal line. Brodeur argued that he had the puck covered up just before Martinez's shot, but the officials did not blow the play dead and the goal stood.> The Kings' scored their second goal at 15:07 of the third period when Justin Williams sent a pass near the boards to Dustin Brown, who then passed to Anže Kopitar on the other side, who then lifted the puck over Brodeur. In the third period, two New Jersey penalties led to two Los Angeles power play goals. Meanwhile, New Jersey could not score off of Los Angeles' five penalties during the game, including Jeff Carter's high-sticking double-minor in the first period that led to a Devils 5 on 3 for about a minute.

This contest also saw the return of Kings' left winger Simon Gagné, who had been out of the Los Angeles lineup since December 26, 2011, due to a head injury. Gagné, who played in the Stanley Cup Final for the second time in three years, took Brad Richardson's spot in the lineup. In 2010, Gagné, along with current Kings teammates Mike Richards and Jeff Carter, were members of the Philadelphia Flyers that lost to the Chicago Blackhawks in six games.

With the win, the Kings became the first team in NHL history to take a 3–0 series lead in all four rounds of the playoffs.

Scoring summary
Period	Team	Goal	Assist(s)	Time	Score
1st	None				
2nd	LAK	Alec Martinez (1)	Dwight King (1) and Trevor Lewis (6)	05:40	1–0 LAK
2nd	LAK	Anže Kopitar (8)	Dustin Brown (10) and Justin Williams (11)	15:07	2–0 LAK
3rd	LAK	Jeff Carter (6) – pp	Mike Richards (8) and Willie Mitchell (2)	04:15	3–0 LAK
3rd	LAK	Justin Williams (3) – pp	Drew Doughty (10) and Anže Kopitar (10)	06:47	4–0 LAK
Penalty summary
Period	Team	Player	Penalty	Time	PIM
1st	LAK	Mike Richards	Elbowing	14:35	2:00
1st	LAK	Jeff Carter	High-sticking – double minor	15:36	4:00
1st	NJD	Marek Židlický	Tripping	16:57	2:00
2nd	LAK	Anže Kopitar	Holding	06:16	2:00
2nd	LAK	Dustin Penner	Goaltender Intererence	09:41	2:00
2nd	LAK	Simon Gagné	Slashing	18:30	2:00
3rd	NJD	Mark Fayne	Cross Checking	03:29	2:00
3rd	NJD	Marek Židlický	High-sticking	05:30	2:00

Shots by period
Team	1	2	3	Total
NJD	7	9	6	22
LAK	6	9	6	21

=== Game four ===
June 6	New Jersey Devils	3–1	Los Angeles Kings	Staples Center	Recap

New Jersey avoided being swept for the first time in team history when Adam Henrique scored at 15:29 of the third period to break a 1–1 tie, and Ilya Kovalchuk added an empty-netter with 19.1 seconds left, defeating the Kings 3–1, and forcing a fifth game. This marked the third time in this playoffs that the Kings failed to close out a series in game four after winning the first three games. The game remained scoreless until 7:56 of the third period when Patrik Eliáš shot a rebound into the Los Angeles net, giving New Jersey their first lead of the series. This lead was cut short a minute later, as David Clarkson was called for boarding at 8:52, and four seconds later Drew Doughty tied the game with a power play goal for the Kings. With the loss, the Kings failed to match the record set by the Edmonton Oilers, who was the last team to lose only two games in their 1988 championship run with at least 16 required games played in a four-round format.

Scoring summary
Period	Team	Goal	Assist(s)	Time	Score
1st	None				
2nd	None				
3rd	NJD	Patrik Eliáš (5)	Bryce Salvador (9) and Dainius Zubrus (7)	07:56	1–0 NJD
3rd	LAK	Drew Doughty (4) – pp	Mike Richards (9) and Anže Kopitar (11)	08:56	1–1
3rd	NJD	Adam Henrique (4)	David Clarkson (9) and Alexei Ponikarovsky (6)	15:29	2–1 NJD
3rd	NJD	Ilya Kovalchuk (8) – en	Unassisted	19:40	3–1 NJD
Penalty summary
Period	Team	Player	Penalty	Time	PIM
1st	NJD	Zach Parise	Tripping	03:02	2:00
1st	LAK	Jarret Stoll	Hooking	05:53	2:00
1st	LAK	Dustin Brown	Tripping	07:58	2:00
1st	NJD	Bryce Salvador	Interference	19:15	2:00
2nd	NJD	Bryce Salvador	Interference	08:19	2:00
3rd	NJD	David Clarkson	Boarding	08:52	2:00
3rd	LAK	Willie Mitchell	High-sticking	17:10	2:00

Shots by period
Team	1	2	3	Total
NJD	8	3	12	23
LAK	7	7	8	22

=== Game five ===
June 9	Los Angeles Kings	1–2	New Jersey Devils	Prudential Center	Recap

The Devils gave the Kings their only playoff road loss with a 2–1 victory, ending their 10-game road-winning streak, and became the first club since the Detroit Red Wings in 1945 to come back from a 3–0 deficit in the Cup Final to force a game six. New Jersey scored first at 12:45 of the first period, their first power play goal of the series, after Jonathan Quick misplayed the puck and Zach Parise found an open net on the other side before the Los Angeles goaltender could recover. The Kings tied the game at 3:26 of the second when Justin Williams took a pass from Matt Greene, skated into the New Jersey zone and beat Martin Brodeur. But the Devils took the lead for good at 9:05 of the second when Bryce Salvador's shot deflected off of Kings defenceman Slava Voynov into the Los Angeles net. Jarret Stoll's goal at 11:16 of the second period, which would have tied the game, was waved off because he shot it with a high-stick. The Devils later held on for the final minute of the game on a 4-on-4 and the Kings pulling their goaltender for the extra attacker on what became essentially a 5-on-4 advantage.

Scoring summary
Period	Team	Goal	Assist(s)	Time	Score
1st	NJD	Zach Parise (8) - pp	Unassisted	12:45	1–0 NJD
2nd	LAK	Justin Williams (4)	Matt Greene (4)	03:26	1–1
2nd	NJD	Bryce Salvador (4)	Alexei Ponikarovsky (7) and Mark Fayne (4)	09:05	2–1 NJD
3rd	None				
Penalty summary
Period	Team	Player	Penalty	Time	PIM
1st	LAK	Willie Mitchell	Interference	11:00	2:00
2nd	NJD	Mark Fayne	Delay of game (puck over glass)	09:33	2:00
2nd	NJD	Bryce Salvador	High-sticking	18:38	2:00
3rd	LAK	Dustin Brown	Holding the stick	05:51	2:00
3rd	LAK	Dustin Penner	Roughing	18:24	2:00
3rd	NJD	Alexei Ponikarovsky	Roughing	18:24	2:00

Shots by period
Team	1	2	3	Total
LAK	7	9	9	26
NJD	4	12	3	19

=== Game six ===
June 11	New Jersey Devils	1–6	Los Angeles Kings	Staples Center	Recap

External videos
- Game 6 Full replay (NBC's feed) on the NHL's official YouTube channel

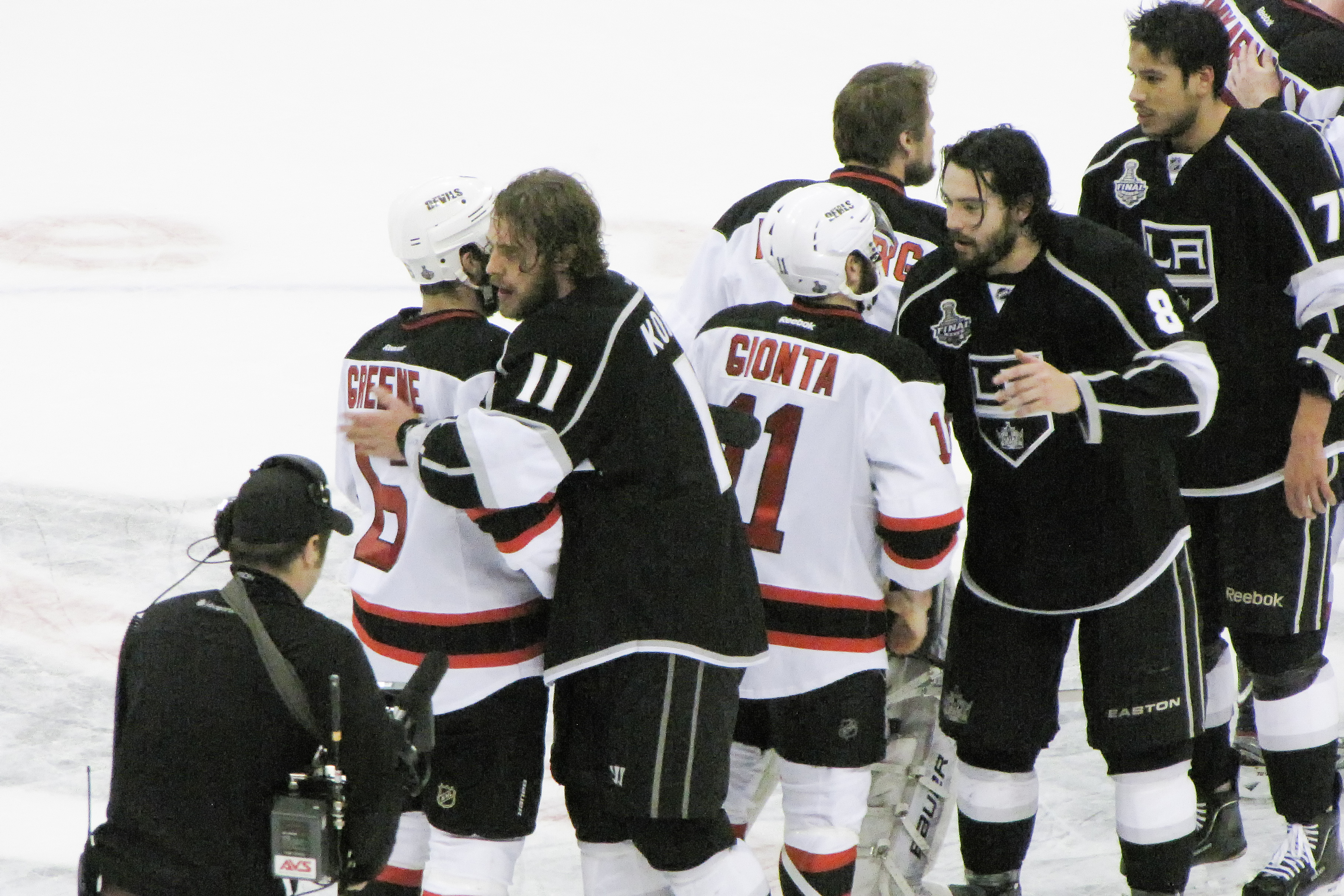
Kings and Devils players shake hands at the end of the game.

The Kings defeated the Devils 6–1 to win their first Stanley Cup in team history. This was the most lopsided Cup-clinching game since 1991, when the Pittsburgh Penguins won Game 6 by beating the Minnesota North Stars 8–0. At 10:10 of the first period, New Jersey's Steve Bernier was assessed a major boarding penalty and a game misconduct on a hit to Los Angeles' Rob Scuderi. The Kings then put the game out of reach by scoring three goals on the ensuing five-minute power play (when a major penalty is assessed, the full five-minute penalty must be served)—the first by Dustin Brown, the second by Jeff Carter, and the third by Trevor Lewis.

Carter then beat Martin Brodeur to score his second goal of the game at 1:50 of the second period after Anton Volchenkov collided with a linesman while trying to defend Brown, who was carrying the puck into the New Jersey Zone. Unimpeded after Volchenkov was screened from the play, Brown easily got the pass off to Carter. Adam Henrique got the Devils' lone goal at 18:45 of the second period after getting the rebound off of a shot by Petr Sýkora. Lewis added an empty net goal at 16:15 of the third period after Brodeur was pulled for an extra attacker. With Brodeur back in the net, Matt Greene scored the Kings' sixth goal of the game 15 seconds later.

Regarding Bernier's game-changing penalty, Rich Chere of The Star-Ledger wrote that it was "the most devastating call in the Stanley Cup Final since the illegal curve on Marty McSorley's stick in 1993". Several Devils fans and other observers believed that there was inconsistency with the officials' calls, and that they missed a couple of calls on the Kings at the time of that hit, such as one Jarret Stoll made on the Devils' Stephen Gionta. With the win, the Kings became only the second California-based NHL team to win the Stanley Cup, following the Anaheim Ducks, who beat Ottawa in 2007, the 12th expansion team to win it, and the second-to-last of the surviving 1967 expansion teams to do so (in 2019, the St. Louis Blues became the last remaining franchise from the 1967 expansion to win the Cup). The Kings also became the first eighth-seeded team in North American sports history to win a championship in the four major North American sports leagues.

Scoring summary
Period	Team	Goal	Assist(s)	Time	Score
1st	LAK	Dustin Brown (8) - pp	Drew Doughty (11) and Mike Richards (10)	11:03	1–0 LAK
1st	LAK	Jeff Carter (7) - pp	Dustin Brown (11) and Mike Richards (11)	12:45	2–0 LAK
1st	LAK	Trevor Lewis (2) - pp	Dwight King (2) and Drew Doughty (12)	15:01	3–0 LAK
2nd	LAK	Jeff Carter (8)	Dustin Brown (12) and Anže Kopitar (12)	01:30	4–0 LAK
2nd	NJD	Adam Henrique (5)	Petr Sýkora (3) and Alexei Ponikarovsky (8)	18:45	4–1 LAK
3rd	LAK	Trevor Lewis (3) - en	Dwight King (3) and Jarret Stoll (3)	16:15	5–1 LAK
3rd	LAK	Matt Greene (2)	Unassisted	16:30	6–1 LAK
Penalty summary
Period	Team	Player	Penalty	Time	PIM
1st	NJD	Anton Volchenkov	Hooking	03:01	2:00
1st	NJD	Steve Bernier (served by Petr Sýkora)	Boarding – major	10:10	5:00
1st	NJD	Steve Bernier	Game misconduct	10:10	10:00
2nd	NJD	Bryce Salvador	High-sticking – double minor	06:00	4:00
2nd	NJD	Ryan Carter (served by Petr Sýkora)	Roughing	14:23	2:00
2nd	NJD	Ryan Carter	Misconduct	14:23	10:00
2nd	NJD	David Clarkson	Misconduct	18:19	10:00
2nd	LAK	Dustin Penner	Roughing	19:43	2:00
3rd	LAK	Dustin Brown (served by Justin Williams)	Roughing	06:55	2:00
3rd	NJD	Petr Sýkora	Roughing	06:55	2:00
3rd	LAK	Dustin Brown	Charging	06:55	2:00
3rd	NJD	Marek Židlický	Tripping	08:06	2:00

Shots by period
Team	1	2	3	Total
NJD	4	6	8	18
LAK	13	8	3	24

== Notes ==
The 2012 Stanley Cup Final marked the first time two American-born captains faced off in the championship series of the NHL as Dustin Brown of Los Angeles battled against Zach Parise of New Jersey. This scenario ensured a second time in league history of an American-born captain leading his team to the Stanley Cup championship. Derian Hatcher of the Dallas Stars was the first American-born captain to do so, leading his team over the Buffalo Sabres in 1999.

This Final series guaranteed the lowest-seeded Stanley Cup champion in history. New Jersey, as a fifth seed, won the Stanley Cup in 1995. With the Kings' victory, they became the first team ever to win the Stanley Cup as the eighth seed. They are also the second team to win the Stanley Cup without having home ice advantage in any of the four rounds of the playoffs, after the Devils in 1995.

The Kings are the fourth consecutive team to win the Stanley Cup after opening the season in Europe as part of the NHL Premiere Series. Previous NHL Premiere participants (Pittsburgh in 2009, Chicago in 2010, Boston in 2011) went on to win the Cup.

Jonathan Quick became the third American Conn Smythe Trophy winner, following previous winners Brian Leetch (1994) and Tim Thomas (2011).

== Team rosters ==
Years indicated in boldface under the "Finals appearance" column signify that the player won the Stanley Cup in the given year.

=== Los Angeles Kings ===
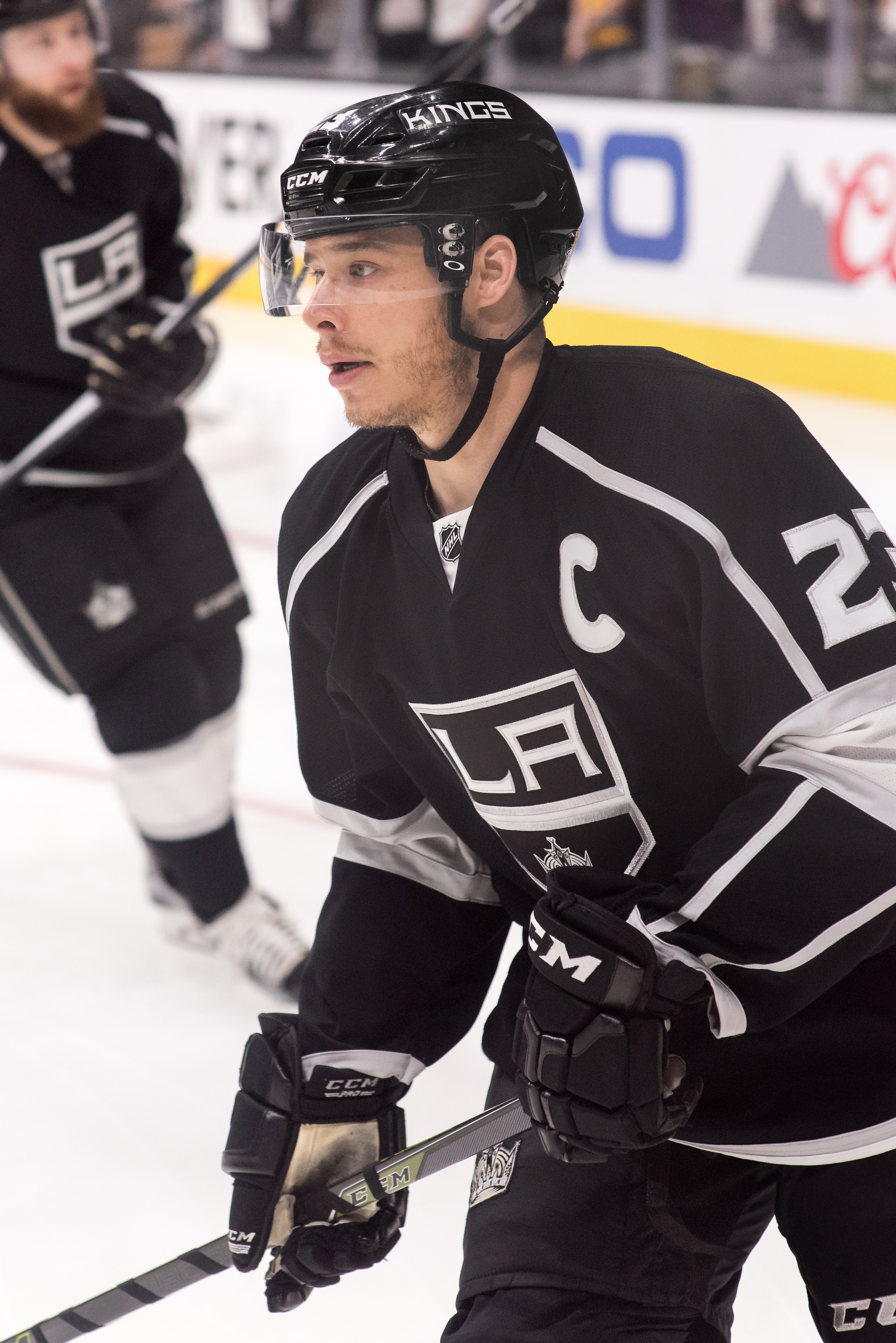
Dustin Brown captained the Kings to the first championship in franchise history

#	Nat	Player	Position	Hand	Acquired	Place of birth	Finals appearance
45	(Canada)	Jonathan Bernier	G	L	2006	Laval, Quebec	first
23	(United States)	Dustin Brown – **C**	RW/LW	R	2003	Ithaca, New York	first
77	(Canada)	Jeff Carter	C/RW	R	2012	London, Ontario	second (2010)
13	(Canada)	Kyle Clifford	LW	R	2009	Ayr, Ontario	first
8	(Canada)	Drew Doughty	D	R	2008	London, Ontario	first
44	(United States)	Davis Drewiske	D	L	2008	Hudson, Wisconsin	first
24	(Canada)	Colin Fraser	C	L	2011	Sicamous, British Columbia	second (**2010**)
12	(Canada)	Simon Gagné	LW	L	2011	Sainte-Foy, Quebec	second (2010)
2	(United States)	Matt Greene – **A**	D	R	2008	Grand Ledge, Michigan	second (2006)
74	(Canada)	Dwight King	LW	L	2007	Meadow Lake, Saskatchewan	first
11	(Slovenia)	Anže Kopitar – **A**	C	L	2005	Jesenice, Yugoslavia	first
22	(United States)	Trevor Lewis	C/RW	R	2006	Salt Lake City, Utah	first
27	(United States)	Alec Martinez	D	L	2007	Rochester Hills, Michigan	first
33	(Canada)	Willie Mitchell	D	L	2010	Port McNeill, British Columbia	first
71	(Canada)	Jordan Nolan	C/RW	L	2009	Garden River, Ontario	first
25	(Canada)	Dustin Penner	LW	L	2011	Winkler, Manitoba	second (**2007**)
32	(United States)	Jonathan Quick	G	L	2005	Milford, Connecticut	first
10	(Canada)	Mike Richards	C	L	2011	Kenora, Ontario	second (2010)
15	(Canada)	Brad Richardson	RW/LW/C	L	2008	Belleville, Ontario	first
7	(United States)	Rob Scuderi	D	L	2009	Syosset, New York	third (2008, **2009**)
28	(Canada)	Jarret Stoll	C	R	2008	Melville, Saskatchewan	second (2006)
26	(Russia)	Slava Voynov	D	R	2008	Chelyabinsk, Soviet Union	first
19	(Canada)	Kevin Westgarth	RW	R	2007	Amherstburg, Ontario	first
14	(Canada)	Justin Williams	RW	R	2009	Cobourg, Ontario	second (**2006**)

=== New Jersey Devils ===
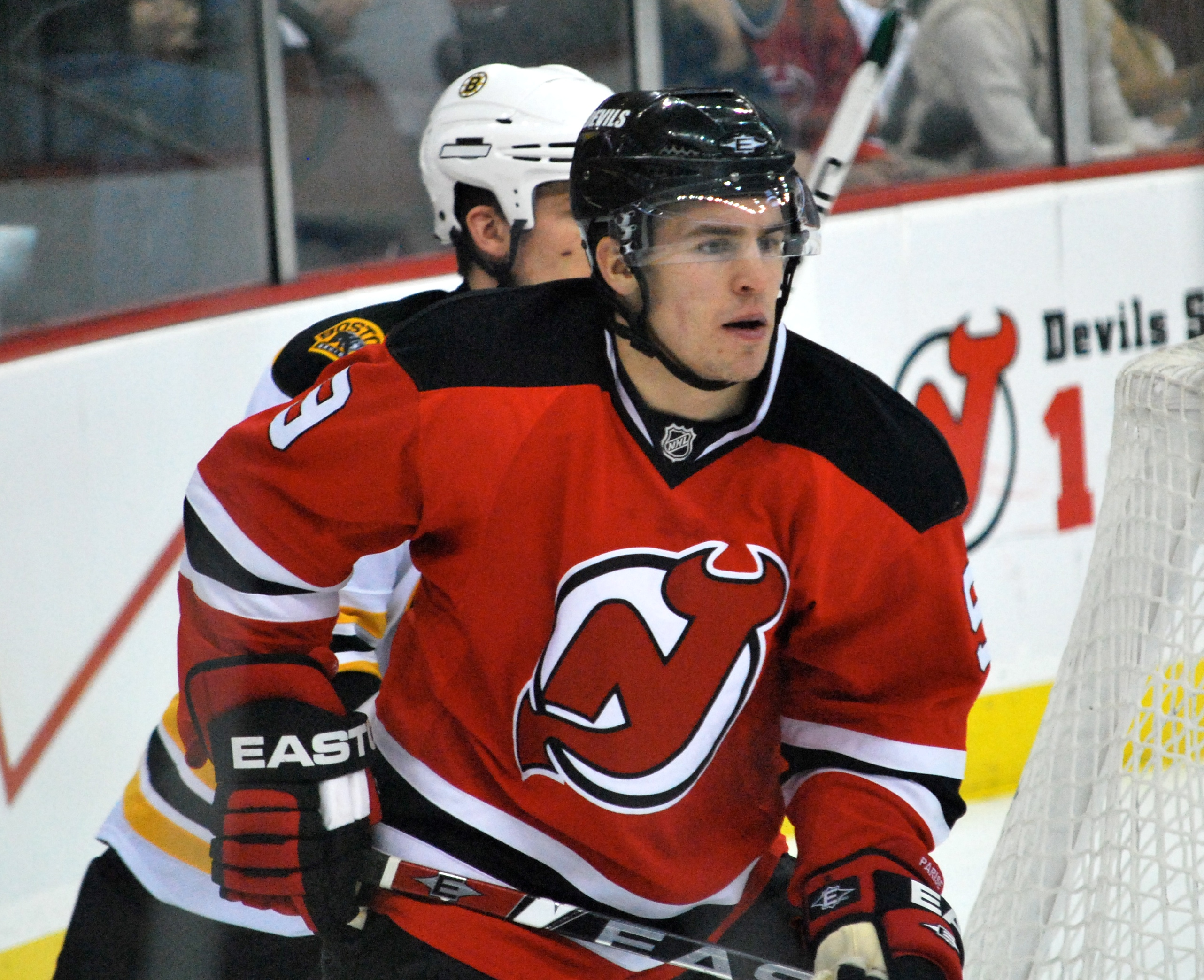
Zach Parise captained the Devils to their first Stanley Cup Final appearance since their 2003 victory

#	Nat	Player	Position	Hand	Acquired	Place of birth	Finals appearance
**18**	(Canada)	Steve Bernier	RW	R	2012	Quebec City, Quebec	first
**22**	(Canada)	Eric Boulton	LW	L	2011	Halifax, Nova Scotia	first (did not play)
**30**	(Canada)	Martin Brodeur	G	L	1990	Montreal, Quebec	fifth (**1995**, **2000**, 2001, **2003**)
**20**	(United States)	Ryan Carter	C	L	2011	White Bear Lake, Minnesota	second (**2007**)
**23**	(Canada)	David Clarkson	RW	R	2005	Toronto, Ontario	first
**26**	(Czech Republic)	Patrik Eliáš – **A**	LW/C	L	1994	Třebíč, Czechoslovakia	fourth (**2000**, 2001, **2003**)
**29**	(United States)	Mark Fayne	D	R	2005	Nashua, New Hampshire	first
**11**	(United States)	Stephen Gionta	RW/C	R	2010	Rochester, New York	first
**6**	(United States)	Andy Greene	D	L	2006	Trenton, Michigan	first
**10**	(United States)	Peter Harrold	D	R	2011	Kirtland Hills, Ohio	first
**1**	(Sweden)	Johan Hedberg	G	L	2010	Leksand, Sweden	first
**14**	(Canada)	Adam Henrique	C	L	2008	Brantford, Ontario	first
**25**	(United States)	Cam Janssen	RW	R	2002	St. Louis, Missouri	first (did not play)
**16**	(Sweden)	Jacob Josefson	C	L	2009	Stockholm, Sweden	first
**17**	(Russia)	Ilya Kovalchuk – **A**	W	R	2010	Kalinin, Soviet Union	first
**5**	(Sweden)	Adam Larsson	D	R	2011	Skellefteå, Sweden	first
**9**	(United States)	Zach Parise – **C**	LW	L	2003	Minneapolis, Minnesota	first
**12**	(Ukraine)	Alexei Ponikarovsky	LW	L	2012	Kyiv, Soviet Union	first
**24**	(Canada)	Bryce Salvador	D	L	2008	Brandon, Manitoba	first
**15**	(Czech Republic)	Petr Sýkora	W	L	2011	Plzeň, Czechoslovakia	sixth (**2000**, 2001, 2003, 2008, **2009**)
**7**	(Sweden)	Henrik Tallinder	D	L	2010	Stockholm, Sweden	first
–	(Sweden)	Mattias Tedenby	LW	L	2008	Vetlanda, Sweden	first (did not play)
**28**	(Russia)	Anton Volchenkov	D	L	2010	Moscow, Soviet Union	second (2007)
**19**	(Canada)	Travis Zajac	C	R	2004	Winnipeg, Manitoba	first
**2**	(Czech Republic)	Marek Židlický	D	R	2012	Most, Czechoslovakia	first
**8**	(Lithuania)	Dainius Zubrus	C/RW	L	2007	Elektrėnai, Soviet Union	second (1997)

== Stanley Cup engraving ==
The 2012 Stanley Cup was presented to Los Angeles Kings captain Dustin Brown by NHL Commissioner Gary Bettman, following the Kings 6–1 win over the New Jersey Devils in the sixth game of the Final.

The following Kings players and staff had their names engraved on the Stanley Cup

2011–12 Los Angeles Kings

=== Players ===
Centres

- 10 Mike Richards
- 11 Anže Kopitar (A)
- 22 Trevor Lewis*
- 24 Colin Fraser
- 28 Jarret Stoll
- 71 Jordan Nolan*
- 77 Jeff Carter*

Wingers

- 12 Simon Gagné
- 13 Kyle Clifford†
- 14 Justin Williams
- 15 Brad Richardson*
- 19 Kevin Westgarth‡
- 23 Dustin Brown (captain)
- 25 Dustin Penner
- 74 Dwight King

Defencemen

- 2 Matt Greene (A)
- 7 Rob Scuderi
- 8 Drew Doughty
- 26 Slava Voynov
- 27 Alec Martinez
- 33 Willie Mitchell
- 44 Davis Drewiske‡

Goaltenders

- 32 Jonathan Quick
- 45 Jonathan Bernier
- * Played both centre and wing.
- † Did not play or dress in the Final.
- ‡ Exemption granted to engrave the name of a player who did not automatically qualify. (Note: Automatic qualification for a player's name to be engraved on the Stanley Cup: Playing in (for a goaltender, dressing for) at least one Stanley Cup Final game or at least half of regular season games for the Stanley Cup winning team.)

=== Coaching and administrative staff ===
- Philip Anschutz (owner/alt. governor), Nancy Anschutz (minority owner), Tim Leiweke (governor), Edward P. Roski Jr. (co-owner)§
- Daniel Beckerman (chief financial officer), Ted Fikre (chief legal & development officer), Dean Lombardi (president/general manager/alt. governor), Luc Robitaille (president of business operations/atl. governor)
- Ron Hextall (vice-president/assistant general manager), Jeff Solomon (vice-president of hockey operations & legal affairs), Darryl Sutter (head coach), John Stevens (assistant coach)
- Jamie Kompon (assistant coach), Bill Ranford (goaltending coach), Chris McGowan (chief operating officer), Michael Altieri (vice-president communications & broadcasting)
- Jack Ferreira (special assistant general manager), Mike O'Connell (pro development & special assignment executive), Nelson Emerson (player development executive), Rob Laird (senior pro scout)
- Michael Futa (co-amateur scouting director), Mark Yannetti (co-amateur scouting director), Lee Callans (scouting coordinator)
- Marshall Dickerson (director of team operations), Ryan Colville (video coordinator), Darren Granger (head equipment manager)
- Chris Kingsley (medical trainer), Dana C. Bryson (assistant equipment manager), Myles Hirayama (assistant athletic trainer)
- § Name not included in list sent to engraver, but name still engraved on the Stanley Cup. (Note: Edward P. Roski Jr. (co-owner) did not make the list sent to the engraver. However, when the Cup came back from the engraver, his name was on it. The engraver included 53 names – one more than the normal limit.)

=== Engraving notes ===
- #19 Kevin Westgarth (RW) played in 25 regular season games. He missed the rest of the season due to a wrist injury. #44 Davis Drewiske (D) played in 9 regular season games. He was a healthy scratch for most of the season. Both spent the entire season with Los Angeles and did not play in the playoffs. As they did not automatically qualify, Los Angeles successfully requested an exemption to engrave their names.
- Mike Richards was engraved as his full name of Michael.
- 53 names were engraved on the Stanley Cup instead of the standard 52.
- Denver Wilson (assistant equipment manager), Chris Pikosky (massage therapist), and Bernie Nicholls (coaching consultant); were left off the Stanley Cup engraving, but included in the team picture.
- Terry Murray was the head coach of the Kings for the first 29 games of the 2011–12 season, and then remained with the team as a scout for the rest of the season. The Kings organization requested permission to include his name on the Cup, but the NHL denied the request because too many names had been submitted for engraving. Not in the team picture, but was given a Stanley Cup ring.
- The Kings also gave Stanley Cup rings to retired players Rogie Vachon and Marcel Dionne.

=== Player notes ===
- Thirteen players on the roster during the Final were left off the Stanley Cup engraving due to not qualifying. Only Andrei Loktionov played in the playoffs. Scott Parse was injured. The rest were healthy scratches for the entire playoffs.

Included in the team picture

- #48 Andrei Loktionov (C) – 39 regular season games and 2 playoff games
- #21 Scott Parse (RW) – 9 regular season games. He missed most of the season due to injuries, including the entire playoffs. He was the only player left off the Stanley Cup engraving who spent the entire season with Los Angeles.
- #67 Marc-André Cliche (C) – 0 regular season games, 72 for Manchester of the AHL
- #6 Jake Muzzin (D) – 0 regular season games, 71 for Manchester of the AHL
- #31 Martin Jones (G) – 0 regular season games, 41 for Manchester of the AHL

Not in the team picture

- #81 Andrew Campbell (D) – 76 regular season games for Manchester of the AHL
- #37 Thomas Hickey (D) – 76 regular season games for Manchester of the AHL
- #57 Linden Vey (RW/C) – 74 regular season games for Manchester of the AHL
- #59 Patrick Mullen (D) – 69 regular season games for Manchester of the AHL
- #73 Tyler Toffoli (RW) – 65 regular season games for Ottawa of the OHL
- #62 Justin Azevedo (C) – 63 regular season games for Manchester of the AHL
- #56 Richard Clune (LW) – 56 regular season games for Manchester of the AHL
- #64 Andy Andreoff (C) – 5 regular season games for Manchester of the AHL

== Officials ==
The following officials were chosen for the Stanley Cup Final:

- Referees: Dan O'Halloran, Dan O'Rourke, Chris Rooney, Brad Watson
- Linesmen: Derek Amell, Jean Morin, Pierre Racicot, Jonny Murray

== Television ==
In Canada, the series was televised in English on CBC and in French on the cable network RDS. In the United States, NBC broadcast the first two and the final two games, while the NBC Sports Network televised games three and four.

The 2012 Final rated poorly in comparison to the four most recent Stanley Cup Final on United States television. The first four games were marred by low ratings; had the series ended in four games, this series would have produced the lowest television ratings ever for a championship series of any major league sport. However, game five and game six produced somewhat higher ratings than the first four games, which gave the 2012 Final a slightly higher rating than the 2007 Final (which was on par with the 2006 Final); the 2007 Final therefore remains the lowest-rated championship series in American television history.

Game	American audience (in millions)	Canadian audience (in millions)
1	2.90	2.13
2	2.94	2.57
3	1.74	2.16
4	2.07	3.01
5	3.33	3.11
6	4.93	3.13

== Notes ==
Preceded by Boston Bruins; 2011	Los Angeles Kings; Stanley Cup champions 2012	Succeeded by Chicago Blackhawks; 2013
