= Sacred Heart High School (Yorkton) =

High School in Saskatchewan, Canada

Location
- 280 Gladstone Avenue North; Yorkton, Saskatchewan, S3N 2A8; Canada; 51.22°N 102.476°W

Information
- School type: High School
- Motto: Faith, Knowledge, Unity
- Founded: 1917
- School board: Christ the Teacher Catholic Schools
- Principal: Rachel Sterzuk
- Grades: 9-12
- Enrollment: 393 (2022)
- Language: English, French Immersion
- Area: Yorkton
- Colours: Green and Gold
- Mascot: A Saint Bernard"Barkley"
- Team name: Saints
- Website: sacredheart.christtheteacher.ca

Sacred Heart High School is a high school located in Yorkton, Saskatchewan, Canada.

== History ==
Sacred Heart High School was founded by the Sisters Servants of Mary Immaculate, and the school celebrated its 75th anniversary in 1991. Sacred Heart High School has a long tradition of providing strong academic and spiritual education to its students. On January 11, 1917, the school opened, and was originally established as the Sacred Heart Institute, under the leadership of Sister Ambrosia Lenkewich, the Canadian Provincial Superior at the time.

In 1945, the name changed to Sacred Heart Academy and it became a boarding school for girls from grade nine to twelve. The first volleyball team was established in 1959, and the first Musical was held in 1961. In 1967, the first male teachers were hired. From 1967 to 1973, boys and girls from Sacred Heart Academy and St. Josephs boys' school, exchanged classes. Sacred Heart High School had a swimming pool and a bowling alley in the basement, which is unique to any other school.

In 1973, boys were allowed to enroll at Sacred Heart Academy, making it co-ed for the first time. The name was then changed to Sacred Heart High School. Grade eight was added to the school in 1989.

In April 1998 Sacred Heart was completely handed over to the Yorkton Catholic Schools.

In the fall of 2000, the Yorkton Roman Catholic School Division was granted approval to construct a new high school and the new facility opened in February 2003. With this new facility came more opportunities for students to join different types of clubs. There had already been a drama club. The new theatre cost $1.3 million.

== The school crest ==
The Sacred Heart Crest represents the fundamental values of faith, knowledge, and unity. Each colour in the crest represents a certain aspect of the school's mission statement. Green symbolizes faith while gold symbolizes knowledge and white symbolizes unity. This crest design was the winner of a school competition in 1975 and was created by a grade 10 student at the time, Lucie Gelinas.

== Saint of the Month ==
Every month two students from Sacred Heart High school (male & female) are chosen as Saint of the Month which is a program designed to acknowledge students that are hard working and are involved with extra curricular activities. These students are nominated by a committee that meets at the end of each month. Votes are cast by who they think is most deserving.

== Student activities ==
=== Choir ===
The Sacred Heart High School Choir presents an opportunity for music lovers to perform vocally.

=== Drama ===
The Sacred Heart High School Drama Club produces a play to enter in Regional and Provincial Festival competitions. In 1999, Sacred Heart were the provincial winners for their production of “The New Canadian Kid”. In 2004, “The Wild Flowering of Chastity” won the Provincial Drama Festival crown. "Baby", the 2008 Saskatchewan Drama Festival play, placed Best Overall on both the Regional level and the Provincial level. Many acting awards were given to actors and actresses in both plays, and awards were given out as well to students who mastered the technical roles behind the scenes.

=== Musical ===
Sacred Heart High School regularly stages a Broadway musical. Participating students have the opportunity to explore talents in singing, acting, stage design, make-up, music, and more. Over fifty students participate each year. Past musicals have included: Oklahoma (1994), West Side Story (1997), Annie (1998), Anything Goes (1999), The Sound of Music (2002), Once Upon a Mattress (1993, 2003), Little Shop of Horrors (2004), Oliver! (2005), Anne of Green Gables (1992, 2006), High School Musical (2007), Beauty and the Beast (2008), The Wiz (2009), Annie (2010), Camp Rock (2011), Grease (2013), Fiddler on the Roof (2015), and The Little Mermaid (2017). Auditions are held in September. Performances are in late November or early December.

=== Outdoor Education ===
In 2002, Sacred Heart High School began an Outdoor Education program. Students from Grades 9–12 may apply to participate in the program. Students are required to participate in regular training and testing sessions through the school year. The program culminates in a week-long outdoor education excursion. Special Credit may be assessed for participants.

=== SADD ===
At Sacred Heart, the Students Against Drunk Driving (SADD) group has a number of school based activities which promote responsible attitudes toward drinking. Anyone may be a member of SADD and may join at any time.

=== School Newspaper ===
The Sacred Heart Beat newspaper provides a forum for an exchange of ideas, as well as a creative outlet for literary and artistic students and an opportunity to develop organizational and public relations skills. Students gain experience in the practical application of computers and photography. The Beat is published several times during the school year. Eleven times, from 1999 through 2006 and from 2011 through 2013, The Beat received an award of merit for the Best Overall High School Newspaper in Saskatchewan.

=== Sports ===
Sacred Heart High School fields teams in golf, cross country running, soccer, football, volleyball, basketball, outdoor track & field, curling, and badminton.

=== Student Representative Council ===
The SRC is composed of students from grades nine to twelve who are elected by their class or by a student body election. Elections are held in June each year, except for the grade 9s election which is held in October.

== Channel 22 ==
Channel 22 is the school's rockband. It is a curricular program in which students explore their abilities and talents in music. Auditions are held every year in which the two organizers of the program narrow down over 40 auditions into 15 or more students.

== Notable alumni ==
- Charlie David - actor
- Jarret Stoll - professional hockey player
