= Jordan Nolan =

Canadian ice hockey player

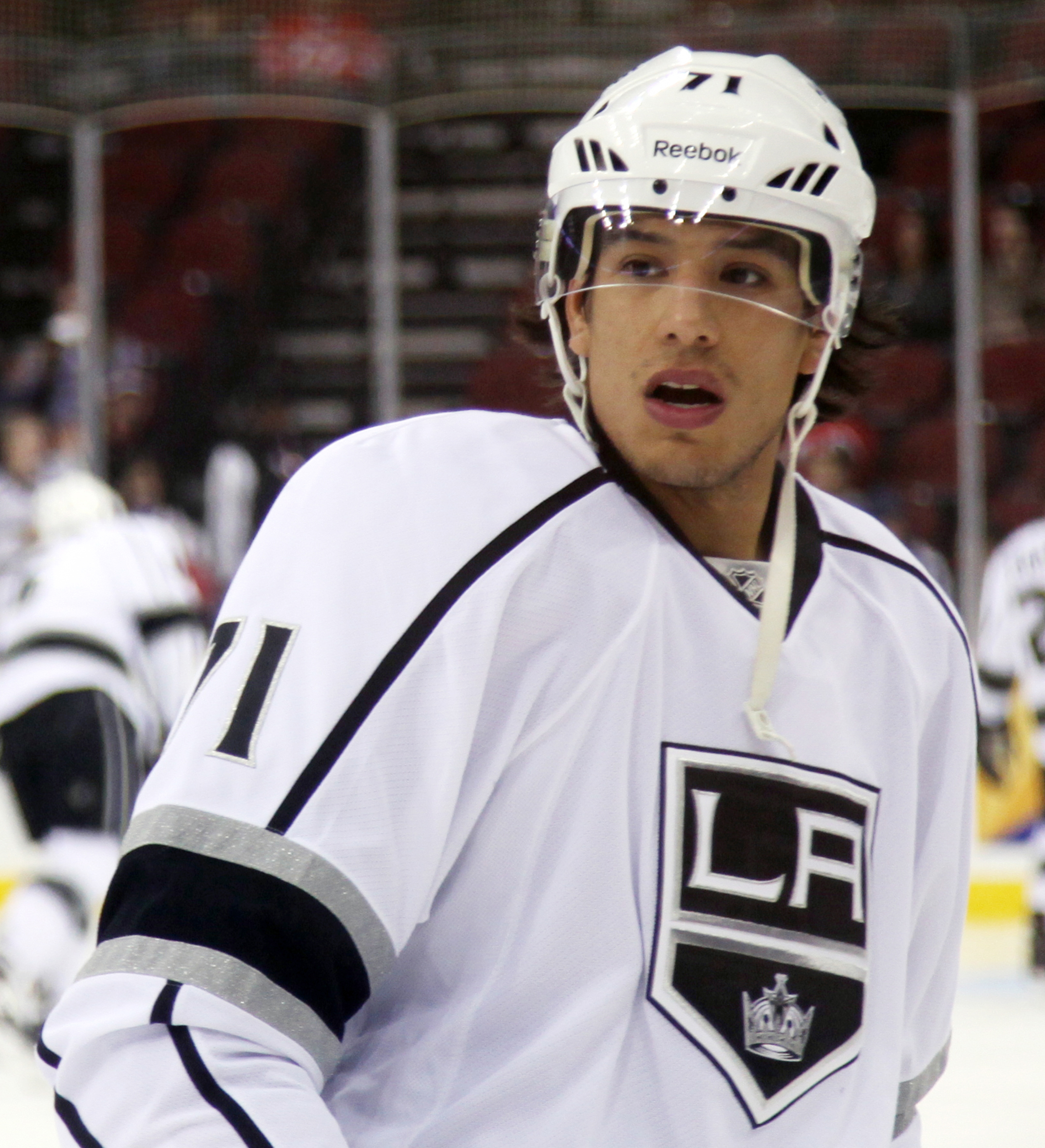
- Nolan with the Los Angeles Kings in November 2013
- Born: June 23, 1989 (age 37) Garden River, Ontario, Canada
- Height: 6 ft 3 in (191 cm)
- Weight: 219 lb (99 kg; 15 st 9 lb)
- Position: Centre
- Shot: Left
- Played for: Los Angeles Kings; Buffalo Sabres; St. Louis Blues
- NHL draft: 186th overall, 2009; Los Angeles Kings
- Playing career: 2010–2021

Jordan Nolan (born June 23, 1989) is a Canadian actor and former professional ice hockey forward. He was selected by the Los Angeles Kings in the seventh round (186th overall) of the 2009 NHL entry draft.

Nolan won the Stanley Cup three times, twice with the Kings in 2012 and 2014 and once with the St Louis Blues in 2019.

== Playing career ==
=== Junior ===
Nolan began his career with the Erie Otters of the Ontario Hockey League (OHL) in 2005–06, scoring just three goals in 33 games. He then spent two seasons with the Windsor Spitfires from 2006 to 2008, followed by two seasons with the Sault Ste. Marie Greyhounds from 2008 to 2010.

In his first season as a Greyhound, Nolan would lead the offensively-challenged and dead last OHL team with 16 goals and 27 assists in 64 games. He played in all situations, including acting as an enforcer for the team during the 2008–09 season. The following year Nolan would put up 23 goals and 25 assists in 49 games for the Greyhounds before joining the Ontario Reign of the ECHL to finish off his junior career.

=== Professional ===
Nolan was selected by the Los Angeles Kings in the seventh round (186th overall) in the 2009 NHL entry draft. After the Greyhounds' season ended in 2010, Nolan was sent to the Ontario Reign of the ECHL. He only played three games with the team. On October 5, 2010, Nolan was signed by the Los Angeles Kings to a three-year, entry-level contract.

He spent the next two seasons with the Manchester Monarchs of the American Hockey League (AHL), where he totaled 14 goals and 39 points in 115 games. On February 11, 2012, Nolan was recalled to join the Los Angeles Kings, and was assigned uniform number 71, the first player on the team to wear the number. He played his first NHL game that same day, a loss to the New York Islanders. He scored his first NHL goal the following day in a victory over the Dallas Stars. Throughout his career, Nolan would also be known for his scraps with opposing players, occasionally serving in the role of an enforcer.

On May 6, 2012, Nolan scored his first career NHL playoff goal, helping the Kings sweep the St. Louis Blues in the Western Conference Semifinals of the 2012 Stanley Cup playoffs. He later won the Stanley Cup with the Kings during the 2012 Stanley Cup Final and 2014 Stanley Cup Final

On September 26, 2017, Nolan was waived by the Kings. He was claimed off waivers by the Buffalo Sabres the following day. In the 2017–18 season, on October 24, 2017, nearly a month after his debut with the Sabres, Nolan participated in what was his 300th game in the NHL. The Sabres were victorious in their home arena with a final score of 1-0 against the Detroit Red Wings.

Having left the Sabres as a free agent after just one season, Nolan agreed to a one-year, two-way contract with the St. Louis Blues on July 5, 2018 where he won his 3rd Stanley Cup. He returned to the Blues on a one-year extension, and spent the entire 2019–20 season playing with their minor league affiliate, the San Antonio Rampage, for whom he served as Captain before again becoming an unrestricted free agent.

Having left the Blues after two seasons within the organization, Nolan subsequently signed a one-year AHL contract with the Wilkes-Barre/Scranton Penguins, affiliate to the Pittsburgh Penguins, on December 5, 2020. In the pandemic delayed 2020–21 season, Nolan played 2 games with Wilkes-Barre as an alternate captain, registering 1 assist, before he mutually agreed to part ways with the Penguins on March 6, 2021.

On October 12, 2021, Nolan joined the Los Angeles Kings front office staff, signaling the end of his playing career. He will serve as a Community Relations Consultant and Ambassador.

== Post-playing career ==
Nolan, alongside his brother Brandon and Jon Mirasty, portray a trio of hockey players who share the first name Jim (Jordan is Jim #3) in the 2022 TV series Shoresy. They are a spoof of the Hanson Brothers from Slap Shot.

== Playing style and criticism ==
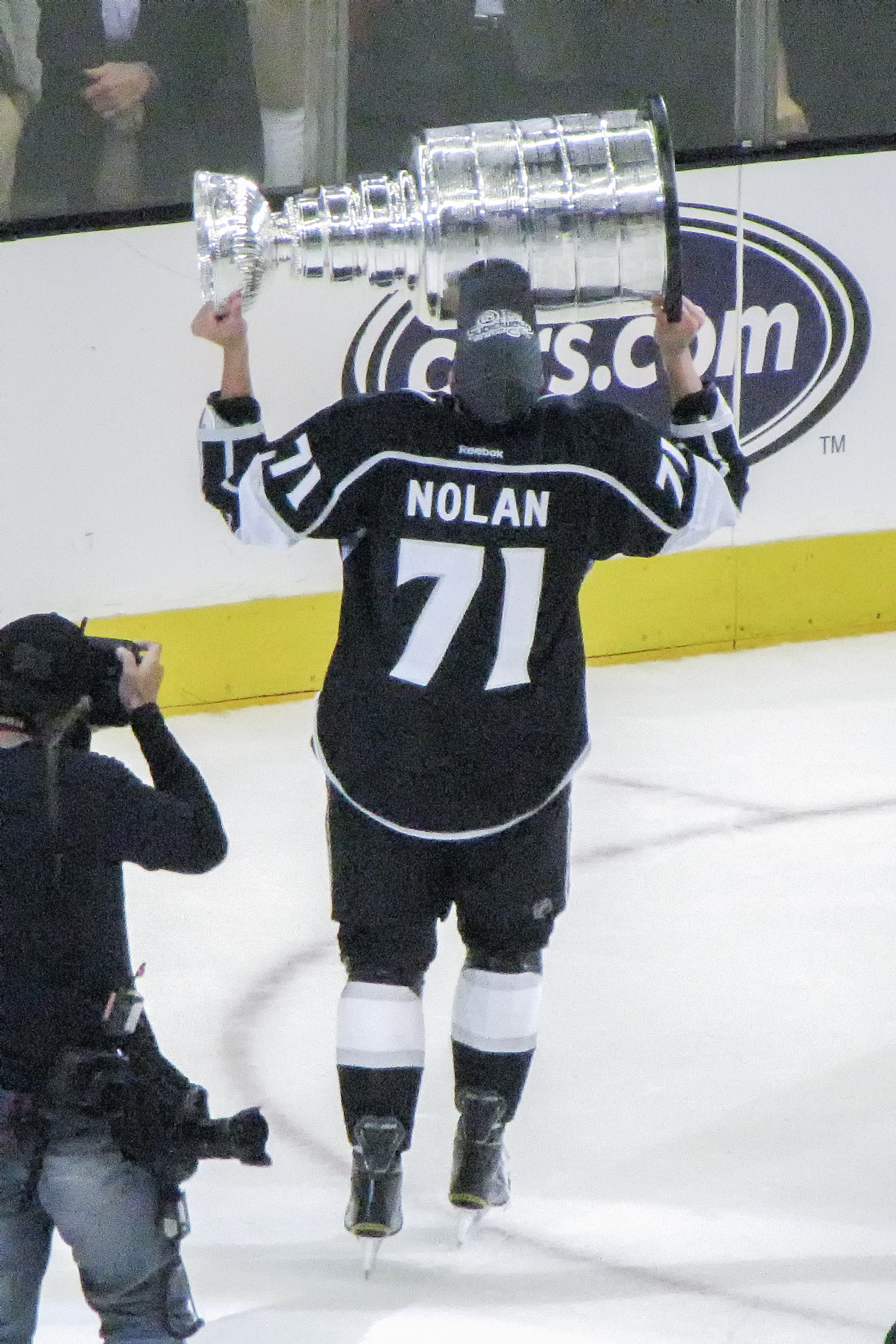
Nolan holding the Stanley Cup after winning the 2012 Stanley Cup Final.

While with the Sault Ste. Marie Greyhounds as a nineteen-year-old, Nolan was involved in an altercation with R.J. Mahalak of the Plymouth Whalers in March 2009. In an unprovoked attack, Nolan punched Mahalak twice in the face, giving him a concussion as he fell to the ice and struck his head. As a result, Nolan received a 20-game suspension by the OHL. "They believed it was vicious enough for a 20-game suspension and they felt it was fortunate the player (Mahalak) wasn't hurt more severely", said Greyhounds' general manager Dave Torrie. "(But) that was one of the scariest things I've ever seen. He (Nolan) went after a player who wasn't going to fight. You have to pay consequences," said Whalers' head coach and general manager Mike Vellucci of the incident. In the NHL, Nolan has faced disciplinary action from the league on multiple occasions. On March 24, 2013, Nolan was fined $1,436.94 by the league for a cross-check to the head of Vancouver Canucks' forward and captain Henrik Sedin. The fine was the maximum allowed under the league's Collective Bargaining Agreement.

In a game against the Edmonton Oilers on March 9, 2014, Nolan sucker punched unsuspecting Oilers' forward Jesse Joensuu after a scrum near the end of the second period. At the time of the punch, Joensuu's hands were being held by a linesman. Nolan was assessed a double-minor for the incident and was scheduled for a disciplinary hearing with NHL Director of Player Safety Brendan Shanahan the following day. On March 10, the NHL announced a one-game suspension for Nolan as a result of the incident.

== Personal life ==
Both Nolan's father, Ted Nolan, and his brother, Brandon Nolan, have played in the National Hockey League. Ted has also served as the head coach of the Buffalo Sabres and the New York Islanders.

Nolan is First Nation Ojibwe on his father's side having grown up in the Garden River First Nation near Sault Ste. Marie, Ontario, Canada. He is also a First Nation Maliseet on his mother's side from St. Mary's First Nation in Fredericton, New Brunswick, Canada. As a child, Nolan learned to play hockey in the outdoors on a handmade rink that his father built for him and his brothers. Nolan along with his father and brother created the Nolan's First Nations Hockey School in 2013, for the purpose of teaching First Nations youth what it takes to be successful and how they can achieve greater things in life {{Independent source inline}}. Nolan continuously sets aside time during this busy schedule to visit First Nation communities around Canada.{{Independent source inline}}

While playing for the Windsor Spitfires in 2006 to 2008, Nolan met his future wife, Laura Colella whom he married in 2015.

== Career statistics ==
			Regular season					Playoffs
Season	Team	League	GP	G	A	Pts	PIM	GP	G	A	Pts	PIM
2004–05	St. Catharines Sabres AAA	SCT U16	42	28	34	62	154	—	—	—	—	—
2005–06	Erie Otters	OHL	33	3	4	7	20	—	—	—	—	—
2005–06	St. Catharines Falcons	GHL	15	5	4	9	31	11	3	3	6	23
2006–07	Windsor Spitfires	OHL	60	11	16	27	100	—	—	—	—	—
2007–08	Windsor Spitfires	OHL	62	13	14	27	69	5	3	0	3	2
2008–09	Sault Ste. Marie Greyhounds	OHL	64	16	27	43	158	—	—	—	—	—
2009–10	Sault Ste. Marie Greyhounds	OHL	49	23	25	48	88	5	1	1	2	4
2009–10	Ontario Reign	ECHL	3	1	1	2	4	—	—	—	—	—
2010–11	Manchester Monarchs	AHL	75	5	12	17	115	—	—	—	—	—
2011–12	Manchester Monarchs	AHL	40	9	13	22	119	—	—	—	—	—
2011–12	Los Angeles Kings	NHL	26	2	2	4	28	20	1	1	2	21
2012–13	Manchester Monarchs	AHL	21	2	4	6	21	—	—	—	—	—
2012–13	Los Angeles Kings	NHL	44	2	4	6	46	7	0	0	0	4
2013–14	Los Angeles Kings	NHL	64	6	4	10	54	3	0	0	0	2
2014–15	Los Angeles Kings	NHL	60	6	3	9	54	—	—	—	—	—
2015–16	Los Angeles Kings	NHL	52	0	5	5	38	—	—	—	—	—
2016–17	Los Angeles Kings	NHL	46	4	4	8	44	—	—	—	—	—
2017–18	Buffalo Sabres	NHL	69	4	4	8	69	—	—	—	—	—
2018–19	San Antonio Rampage	AHL	59	17	18	35	72	—	—	—	—	—
2018–19	St. Louis Blues	NHL	14	0	2	2	14	—	—	—	—	—
2019–20	San Antonio Rampage	AHL	60	11	16	27	52	—	—	—	—	—
2020–21	Wilkes-Barre/Scranton Penguins	AHL	2	0	1	1	2	—	—	—	—	—
NHL totals			375	24	28	52	347	30	1	1	2	27

== Awards and honours ==
Award	Year	Ref
NHL
Stanley Cup champion	2012, 2014, 2019	
