= Matt Greene =

American ice hockey player (born 1983)

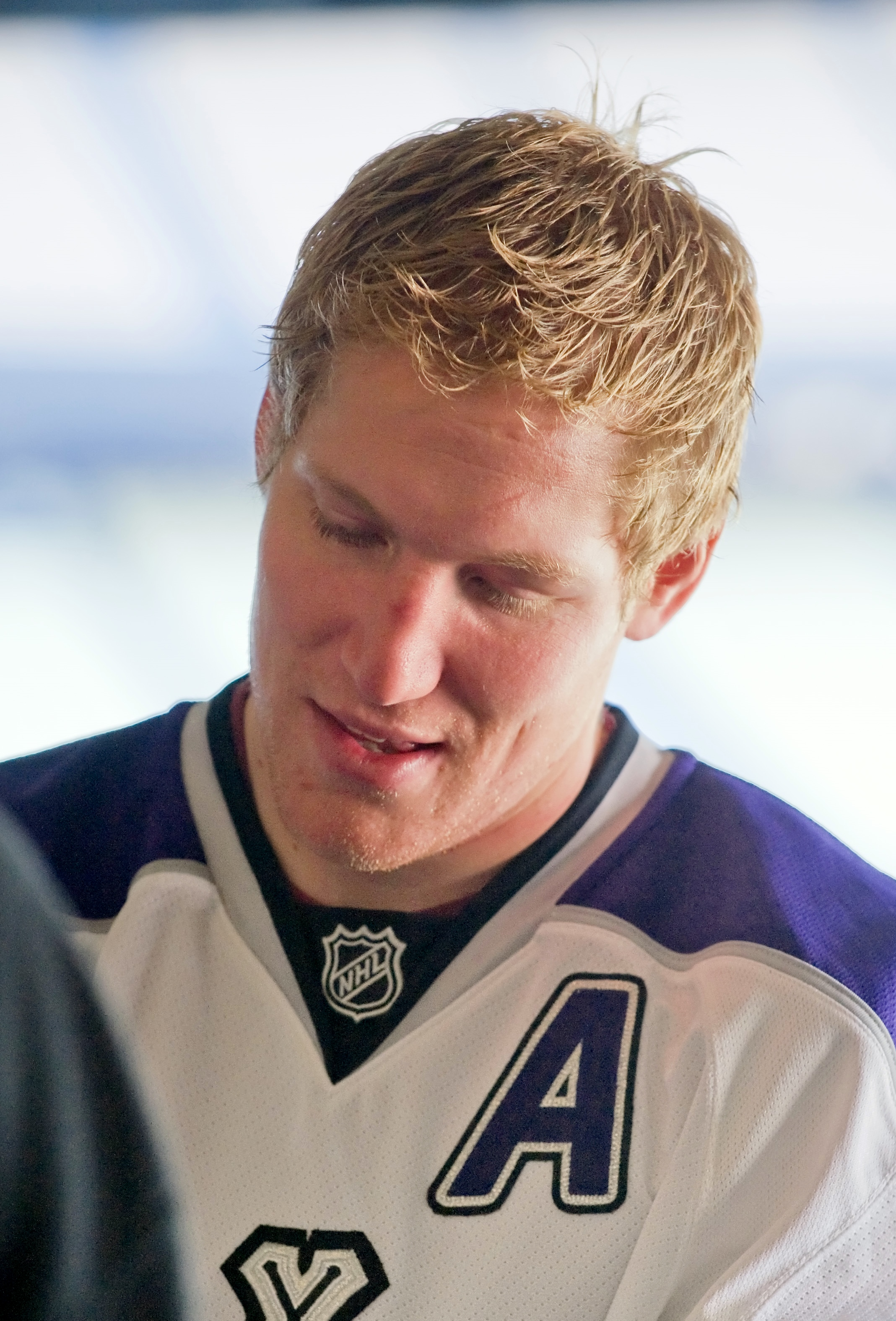
- Greene with the Los Angeles Kings in November 2008
- Born: May 13, 1983 (age 43) Grand Ledge, Michigan, U.S.
- Height: 6 ft 3 in (191 cm)
- Weight: 232 lb (105 kg; 16 st 8 lb)
- Position: Defense
- Shot: Right
- Played for: Edmonton Oilers; Los Angeles Kings
- National team: United States
- NHL draft: 44th overall, 2002; Edmonton Oilers
- Playing career: 2005–2017
- Coaching career: 2026–present
- Coaching career

Current position
- Title: Assistant Coach
- Team: Arizona State
- Conference: NCHC

Biographical details
- Education: North Dakota

Coaching career (HC unless noted)
- 2026–present: Arizona State (assistant)

Matthew George Greene (born May 13, 1983) is an American former professional ice hockey defenseman and assistant coach for the Arizona State Sun Devils men's ice hockey team. Originally drafted in the second round, 44th overall, at the 2002 NHL entry draft by the Edmonton Oilers, he most notably served as an alternate captain for the Los Angeles Kings, with whom he won the Stanley Cup twice. Greene has worked in the Kings' organization as a professional scout after retiring from playing.

== Playing career ==
As a youth, Greene played in the 1997 Quebec International Pee-Wee Hockey Tournament with a minor ice hockey team from Kalamazoo, Michigan.

=== Edmonton Oilers ===
Greene was drafted in the second round, 44th overall, by the Edmonton Oilers in the 2002 NHL entry draft. Prior to his professional career, he played for three seasons with the North Dakota Fighting Sioux men's ice hockey team. In 2004–05, Greene captained The Fighting Sioux to the NCAA Men's Ice Hockey Championship game, losing to the University of Denver Pioneers, 4–1.

Due to his talent, Greene was encouraged to leave college hockey after only three seasons to start a professional career. After a successful training camp with the Oilers prior to the 2005–06 season, Greene signed a professional contract with Edmonton and was assigned to their American Hockey League (AHL) affiliate in Des Moines, the Iowa Stars. He made his NHL debut with the Oilers on December 30, 2005, against the Nashville Predators, and scored his first NHL point on January 25, 2006, away against he Mighty Ducks of Anaheim, assisting on an Aleš Hemský goal.

Wearing sweater number 32 for the first 13 games of his NHL career, Greene changed to sweater number 2 on February 2, 2006, when the Oilers faced off against the Columbus Blue Jackets.

Greene was part of the Edmonton team that made a run to the Stanley Cup Final, though the Cinderalla run eventually fell short after the Oilers lost in game seven to the Carolina Hurricanes. Greene contributed an assist in his team's playoff run.

Greene scored his first NHL goal on December 15, 2006, against Minnesota Wild netminder Manny Fernandez. The goal was scored in the third period of the game, evening the score at 1–1. The Oilers would eventually score two more goals, winning 3–1. Local Edmonton broadcaster Gene Principe awarded Greene the game puck during an interview session following the game. Greene also received the second star of the game due to his effort.

=== Los Angeles Kings ===
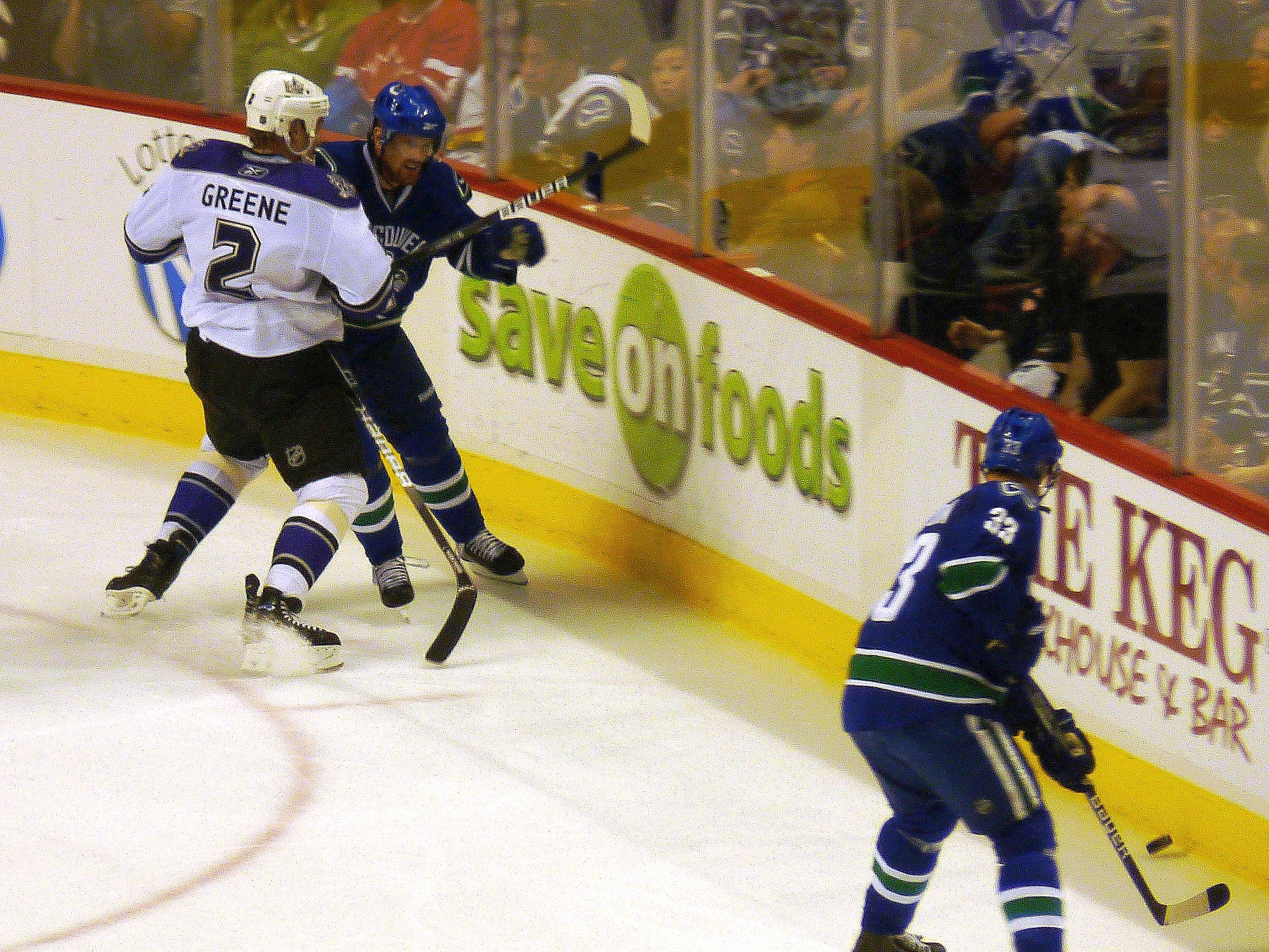
Greene delivering a bodycheck to Daniel Sedin in April 2010

Greene and his Oiler teammate Jarret Stoll were traded to the Los Angeles Kings on June 29, 2008, in exchange for Kings defenseman Ľubomír Višňovský. On October 8, 2008, he was named as an alternate captain of the Kings. Nine days later, on October 17, he signed a five-year contract extension with the Kings. In the 2012 Stanley Cup playoffs, Greene and the Kings won the Stanley Cup by beating the New Jersey Devils in six games. He scored the final goal of the 2012 Stanley Cup Final in the Kings' 6–1 game six triumph.

Injuries limited Greene to only five games during the 2012–13 season, a campaign that saw the Kings fail to defend their Stanley Cup title, losing to the eventual champion Chicago Blackhawks in five games in the Western Conference Finals.

On June 13, 2014, Greene and his Kings teammates defeated the New York Rangers in game five of the 2014 Stanley Cup Final 3–2 in double overtime, securing his and the team's second Stanley Cup in three years. He was then resigned to a 4-year, $10 million contract.

On June 30, 2016, Greene was placed on unconditional waivers by the Kings for the purpose of buying out the final two years of his contract, following a season where the defenseman played only three games due to a shoulder injury, picking up no points and eight penalty minutes. He was however not bought out from his contract and remained with the team for the duration of the 2016–17 season.

Again limited to injury and back surgery, Greene featured in just 26 games for a goal and assist. As a consequence, he was stripped of his alternate captaincy due to the length of time he missed last season. In the following off-season he was activated from the injured reserve to be bought out from the remaining year of his contract on June 13, 2017.

On August 14, 2017, Greene joined the Kings as a pro scout, ending his playing career.

== Coaching career ==
Greene was announced as an assistant coach for the Arizona State Sun Devils men's ice hockey team on October 15, 2026.

== Career statistics ==
=== Regular season and playoffs ===
			Regular season					Playoffs
Season	Team	League	GP	G	A	Pts	PIM	GP	G	A	Pts	PIM
2000–01	US NTDP U18	USDP	34	0	9	9	8	—	—	—	—	—
2000–01	US NTDP Juniors	USHL	20	0	1	1	51	—	—	—	—	—
2001–02	Green Bay Gamblers	USHL	55	4	20	24	150	7	0	1	1	31
2002–03	University of North Dakota	WCHA	39	0	4	4	135	—	—	—	—	—
2003–04	University of North Dakota	WCHA	40	1	16	17	86	—	—	—	—	—
2004–05	University of North Dakota	WCHA	41	2	8	10	126	—	—	—	—	—
2005–06	Iowa Stars	AHL	26	2	5	7	47	—	—	—	—	—
2005–06	Edmonton Oilers	NHL	27	0	2	2	43	18	0	1	1	34
2006–07	Edmonton Oilers	NHL	78	1	9	10	109	—	—	—	—	—
2007–08	Edmonton Oilers	NHL	46	0	1	1	53	—	—	—	—	—
2007–08	Springfield Falcons	AHL	1	0	0	0	2	—	—	—	—	—
2008–09	Los Angeles Kings	NHL	82	2	12	14	111	—	—	—	—	—
2009–10	Los Angeles Kings	NHL	75	2	7	9	83	6	0	1	1	0
2010–11	Los Angeles Kings	NHL	71	2	9	11	70	6	0	0	0	14
2011–12	Los Angeles Kings	NHL	82	4	11	15	58	20	2	4	6	12
2012–13	Los Angeles Kings	NHL	5	0	1	1	8	9	0	2	2	6
2013–14	Los Angeles Kings	NHL	38	2	4	6	47	20	0	4	4	16
2014–15	Los Angeles Kings	NHL	82	3	6	9	54	—	—	—	—	—
2015–16	Los Angeles Kings	NHL	3	0	0	0	8	—	—	—	—	—
2016–17	Los Angeles Kings	NHL	26	1	1	2	19	—	—	—	—	—
NHL totals			615	17	63	80	663	79	2	12	14	82

=== International ===
Year	Team	Event	Result	GP	G	A	Pts	PIM
2001	United States	WJC18	6th	6	0	1	1	10
2003	United States	WJC	4th	7	0	1	1	34
2007	United States	WC	5th	7	0	2	2	6
2008	United States	WC	6th	7	0	0	0	38
2010	United States	WC	13th	6	0	1	1	4
Junior totals				13	0	2	2	44
Senior totals				20	0	3	3	48

== Awards and honors ==
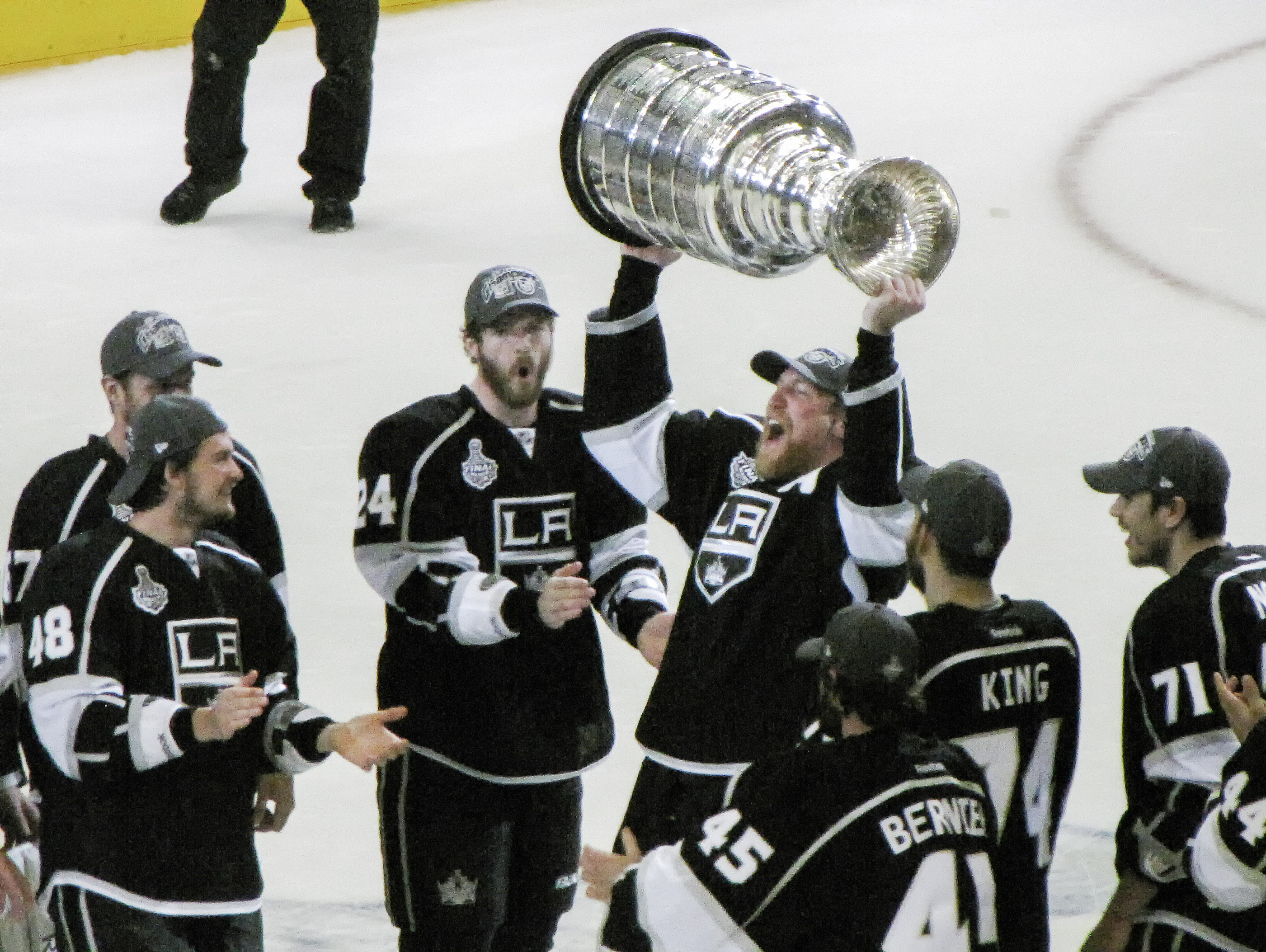
Greene hoists the Stanley Cup as he celebrates with teammates during their 2012 Stanley Cup Final victory.

Award	Year
USHL
Second All-Star Team	2002
NHL
Stanley Cup champion	2012, 2014
International
WC Top 3 player on Team	2010
