= Jamie Kompon =

Canadian ice hockey player and coach

- Born: September 18, 1966 (age 59) Nipigon, Ontario, Canada
- Position: Defence
- Shot: Left
- Played for: ECHL; Hampton Roads Admirals; Cincinnati Cyclones; Winston-Salem Thunderbirds
- NHL draft: Undrafted
- Playing career: 1989–1991

Jamie Kompon (born September 18, 1966) is a Canadian former professional ice hockey defenceman. He now is an assistant coach for the Florida Panthers of the NHL.

Kompon was an assistant coach with the Baltimore Bandits of the American Hockey League during the 1996–97 season before joining the St. Louis Blues, where he served in various hockey operations roles for nine seasons.

Kompon served as an assistant coach with the Los Angeles Kings from 2008 to 2012. Kompon won the Stanley Cup in 2011–2012 as a member of the Kings.

On July 17, 2012, the Chicago Blackhawks hired Kompon as an assistant coach under head coach Joel Quenneville. Kompon won his second Stanley Cup with the Chicago Blackhawks in 2013, winning his second straight Cup in as many years.

On July 9, 2014, Kompon was hired as the head coach and general manager of the Portland Winterhawks of the WHL. He was let go at the end of the 2015–2016 season.

On July 2, 2016, Kompon was hired as an assistant coach for the Winnipeg Jets.

On June 24, 2024, Kompon won his third Stanley Cup Championship as the assistant coach of the Florida Panthers.

On June 17, 2025, Kompon won his fourth Stanley Cup Championship as the assistant coach of the Florida Panthers.
