= Jarret Stoll =

Canadian ice hockey player (born 1982)

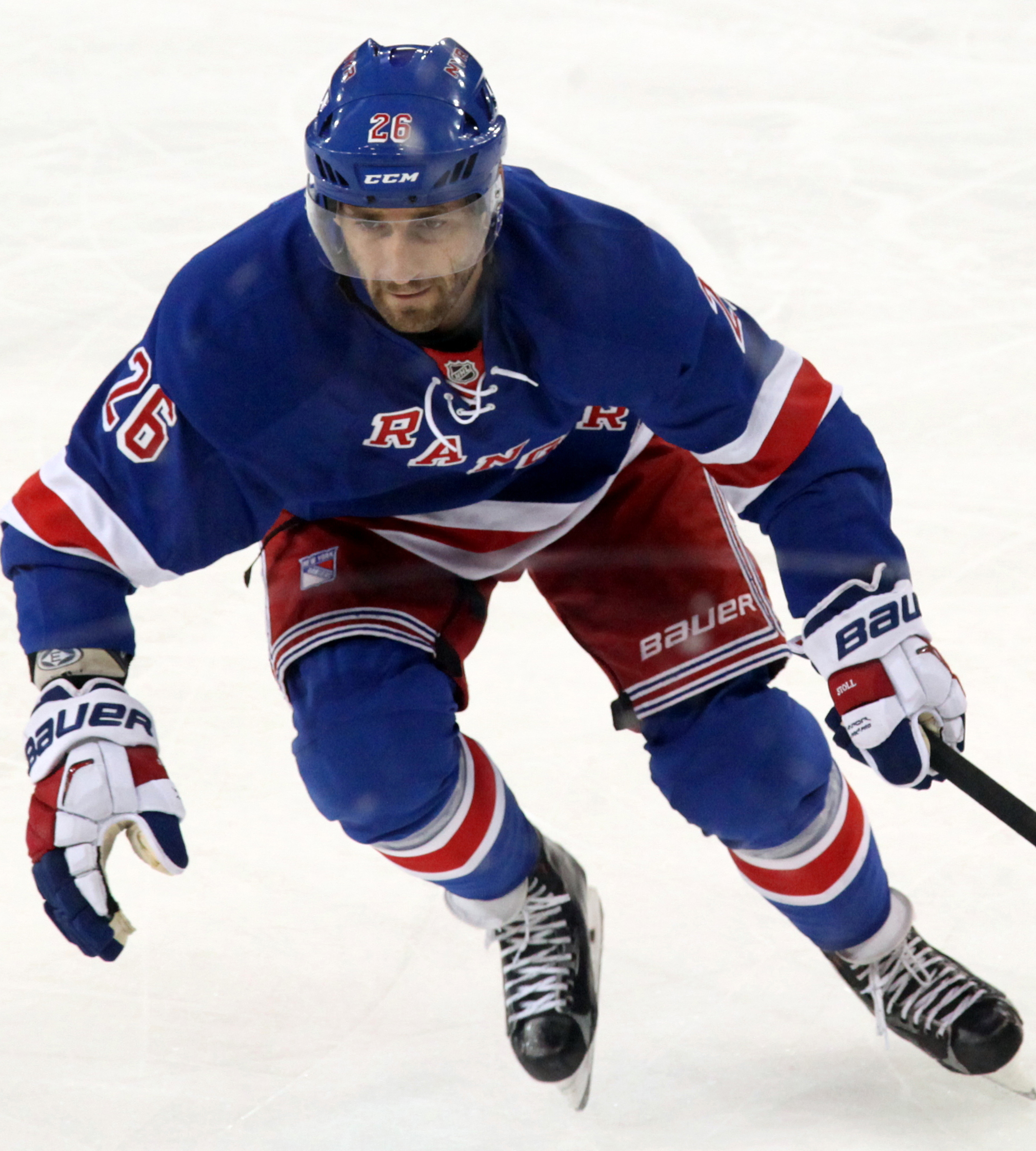
- Stoll with the New York Rangers in September 2015
- Born: June 24, 1982 (age 44) Melville, Saskatchewan, Canada
- Height: 6 ft 1 in (185 cm)
- Weight: 209 lb (95 kg; 14 st 13 lb)
- Position: Centre
- Shot: Right
- Played for: Edmonton Oilers; Los Angeles Kings; New York Rangers; Minnesota Wild
- NHL draft: 46th overall, 2000; Calgary Flames; 36th overall, 2002; Edmonton Oilers
- Playing career: 2002–2016

Jarret Lee Stoll (born June 24, 1982) is a Canadian former professional ice hockey player. He played in the National Hockey League (NHL) for the Edmonton Oilers, Los Angeles Kings, New York Rangers, and Minnesota Wild.

Stoll is a two-time Stanley Cup champion, winning with Los Angeles in 2012 and 2014. He is currently part of the player development department for the Kings.

== Playing career ==
=== Minor ===
Stoll played his early minor hockey in Saskatchewan. He started in the small town of Neudorf, shortly thereafter moving on to minor hockey in Melville, and then to Yorkton, Saskatchewan. In 1997, Stoll helped the Yorkton Bantam AAA Terriers to a Western Canadian Championship. While in Yorkton, Stoll attended St. Paul's Elementary School and Sacred Heart High School. He has an older brother, Kelly, who played for the Yorkton Terriers of the Saskatchewan Junior Hockey League (SJHL), and a younger sister Ashley, who played for the University of Saskatchewan Huskies women's hockey team.

After winning the bantam championship, Stoll moved on to play for the Saskatoon Blazers of the Saskatchewan Midget Triple A Hockey League. While in Saskatoon, Stoll attended St. Joseph High School. Prior to joining the Blazers, Stoll was the first overall pick of the 1997 WHL Bantam Draft by the Edmonton Ice.

=== Junior ===
Stoll started his Western Hockey League (WHL) career at the end of the 1997–98 season with the Ice, while they were still located in Edmonton. After this season, the team relocated to Cranbrook, British Columbia, and were renamed the Kootenay Ice. He played his entire junior career with the Ice franchise. In his third season, he was named team captain. In his final junior season (2001–02), Stoll captained the Ice to a Memorial Cup championship.

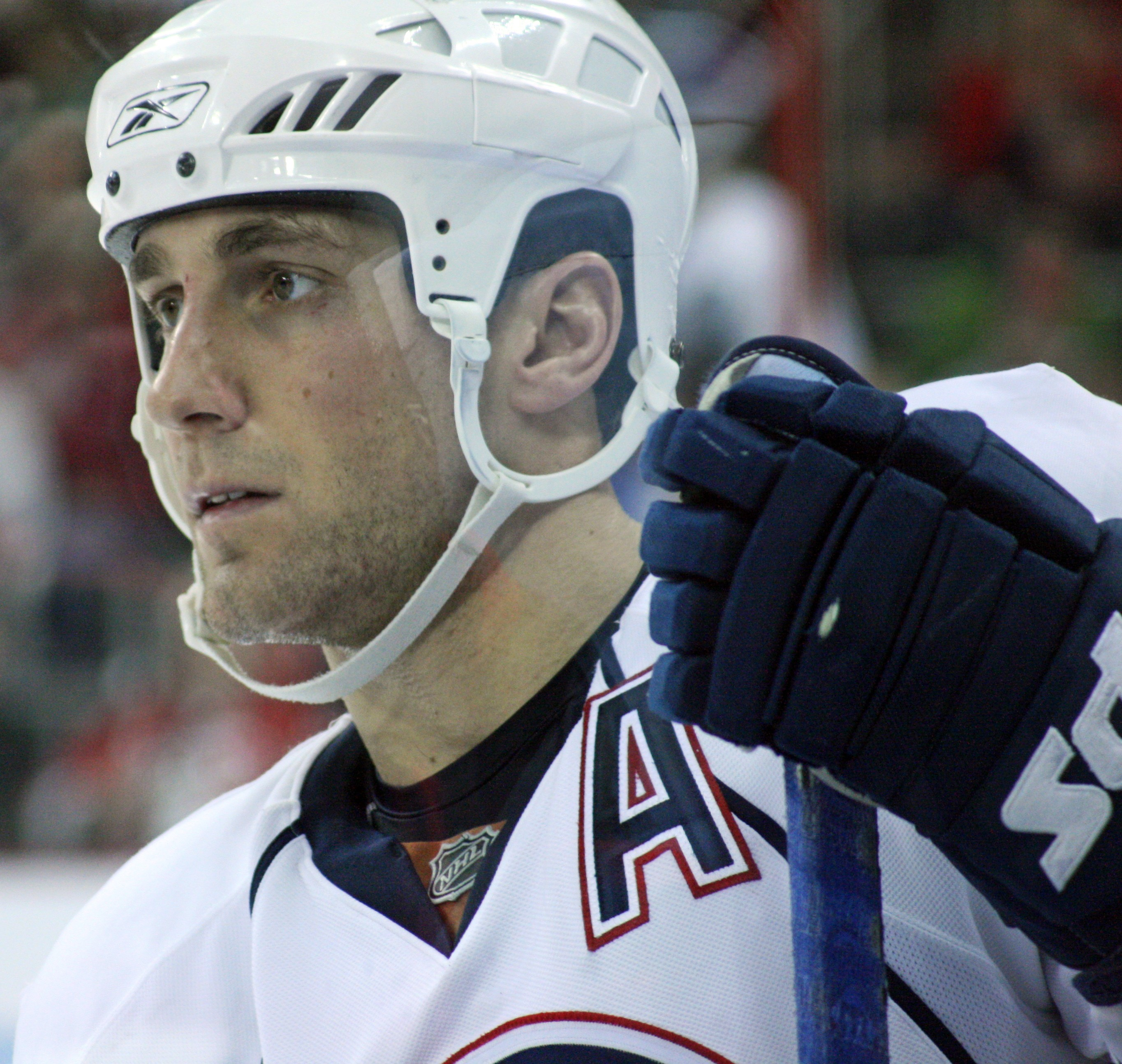
Stoll in January 2008

While playing in Kootenay, Stoll went through the NHL draft process twice. In his initial year of eligibility, he was selected by the Calgary Flames 46th overall in the 2000 NHL entry draft, but was unable to come to terms with the team. The Flames arranged a trade to the Toronto Maple Leafs, who thought they had made arrangements to have a contract signed by the appropriate deadline, but their fax to NHL headquarters did not make it in time. Stoll ended up re-entering the 2002 NHL entry draft, where he was selected by the Edmonton Oilers 36th overall.

Also during his junior career, Stoll twice represented his country at the World Junior Hockey Championships, in 2001 and 2002, winning bronze and silver medals respectively. In 2002, Stoll was named captain for Team Canada.

=== Professional ===
==== Edmonton Oilers ====
After completing his junior career with Kootenay, Stoll entered the Oilers system, and suited up for the Hamilton Bulldogs of the American Hockey League (AHL) in 2002–03. During the season, he received his first call-up to the Oilers and played in his first four NHL games, registering an assist as his first career point. In 2003–04, he skated with the Oilers full-time. During the lock-out season of 2004-05, Stoll returned to the AHL to play with the Edmonton Roadrunners.

Stoll resumed playing with the Oilers during the 2005–06 season. During a game against the Vancouver Canucks on February 4, 2006, Stoll set an Oilers record by winning 21 of 22 faceoffs (95.45%) taken. The 2005–06 season marked Stoll's first Stanley Cup playoffs appearance, highlighted by his game-winning goal in overtime of game three of the Western Conference Quarter-final against the Detroit Red Wings. Entering the 2007–08 season, Stoll was named one of the Oilers alternate captains for the team's road games.

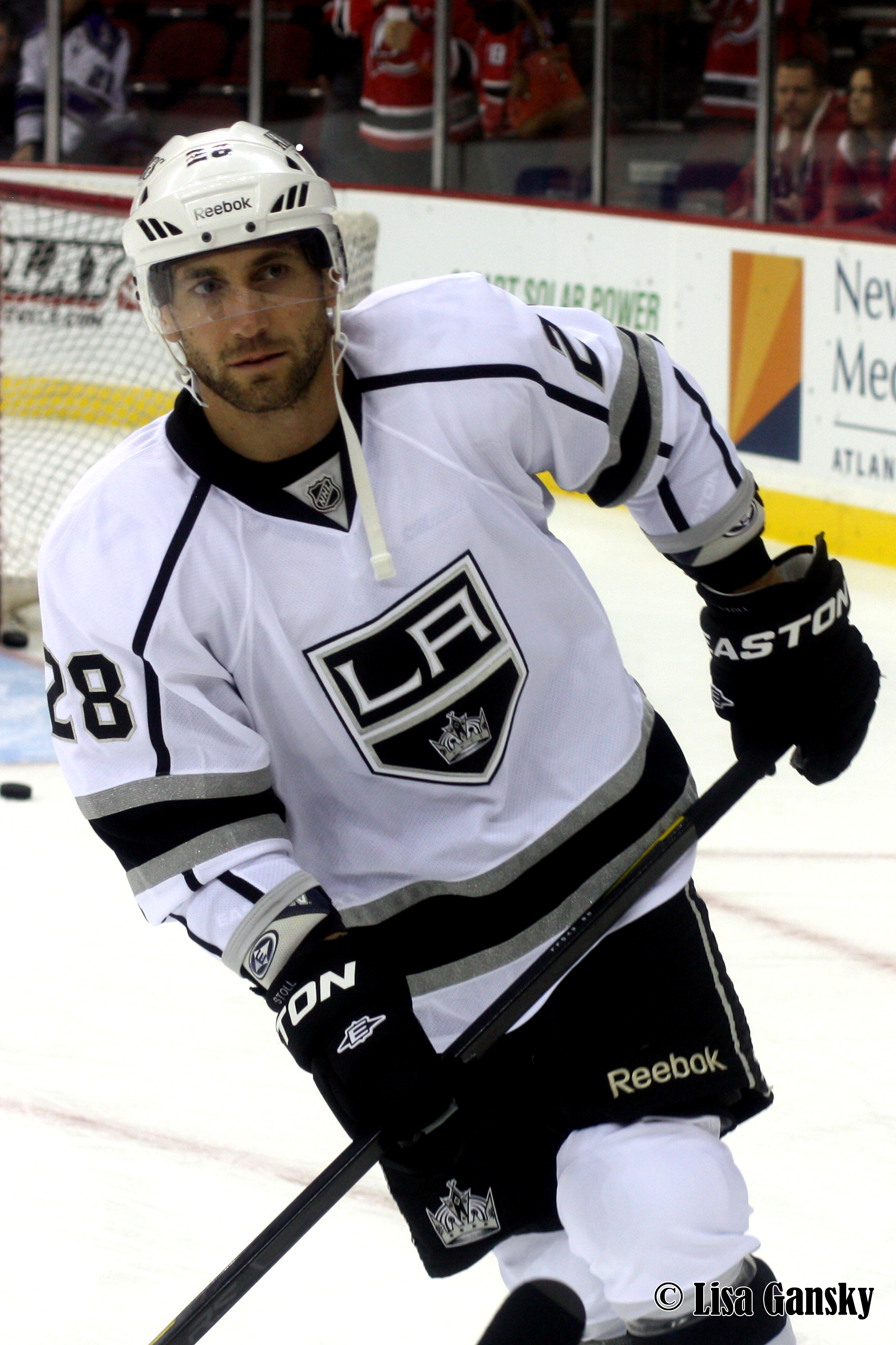
Stoll in October 2011 with the Kings

==== Los Angeles Kings ====
On June 29, 2008, Stoll was traded to the Los Angeles Kings (along with Matt Greene) in exchange for Ľubomír Višňovský. On September 5, the Kings signed Stoll to a four-year contract worth $14.4 million. In 2008–09, Stoll scored 18 goals with 23 assists for 41 points. On April 22, 2012, he scored the series-winning goal in overtime to eliminate the Vancouver Canucks—the winners of the Presidents' Trophy—in game five of the Western Conference Quarter-final.

On June 11, 2012, Stoll won his first Stanley Cup with the Los Angeles Kings, their first championship in history of the franchise, against the New Jersey Devils. Subsequently, he signed a three-year, $9.75 million contract on June 25 to remain with the Kings. On June 13, 2014, Stoll won his second Stanley Cup with the Kings, in game five against the New York Rangers.

==== New York Rangers and Minnesota Wild ====
On August 10, 2015, Stoll signed as a free agent to a one-year contract with the New York Rangers. Stoll made his debut with the Rangers as the team's fourth line centre on opening night of the 2015–16 season in a 3–2 victory over the defending Stanley Cup champions, the Chicago Blackhawks, on October 7, 2015. After 29 games with the Rangers and contributing with just one goal and three points, Stoll was waived by the Rangers. On December 15, 2015, he was claimed off waivers by the Minnesota Wild.

As a free agent from the Wild at the conclusion of the season, Stoll was unable to sign an NHL contract, opting to sign a professional try-out contract ("PTO") to attend the Columbus Blue Jackets' training camp on August 30, 2016. However, he was released from his PTO on October 5, 2016. Although Stoll never officially announced his retirement, he signaled an end to his playing career by accepting a job as a talent scout for the Los Angeles Kings on December 15, 2016.

== Personal life ==
From 2006 to 2011, Stoll hosted his annual charity golf tournament in Saskatoon, Saskatchewan, which benefits the Jarret Stoll Comfort Fund.

Stoll's Los Angeles home was featured on MTV Cribs in 2011.

In the summer of 2015, Stoll was arrested for possession of cocaine and ecstasy at a hotel in Las Vegas. He pleaded guilty to two misdemeanors in the case in June 2015.

Stoll was engaged to model and actress Rachel Hunter, and they planned to marry in August 2009, but the wedding was called off. He began a relationship with sportscaster Erin Andrews in 2012. On December 9, 2016, it was announced he and Andrews were engaged. They were married on June 24, 2017. Andrews and Stoll pursued in vitro fertilization (IVF). Their son was born in July 2023 via surrogacy.

== Career statistics ==
=== Regular season and playoffs ===
			Regular season					Playoffs
Season	Team	League	GP	G	A	Pts	PIM	GP	G	A	Pts	PIM
1997–98	Saskatoon Blazers AAA	SMHL	44	45	44	89	78	—	—	—	—	—
1997–98	Edmonton Ice	WHL	8	2	3	5	4	—	—	—	—	—
1998–99	Kootenay Ice	WHL	57	13	21	34	38	4	0	0	0	2
1999–2000	Kootenay Ice	WHL	71	37	38	75	64	20	7	9	16	24
2000–01	Kootenay Ice	WHL	62	40	66	106	105	11	5	9	14	22
2001–02	Kootenay Ice	WHL	47	32	34	66	64	22	6	14	20	35
2002–03	Hamilton Bulldogs	AHL	76	21	33	54	86	23	5	8	13	25
2002–03	Edmonton Oilers	NHL	4	0	1	1	0	—	—	—	—	—
2003–04	Edmonton Oilers	NHL	68	10	11	21	42	—	—	—	—	—
2004–05	Edmonton Roadrunners	AHL	66	21	17	38	92	—	—	—	—	—
2005–06	Edmonton Oilers	NHL	82	22	46	68	74	24	4	6	10	24
2006–07	Edmonton Oilers	NHL	51	13	26	39	48	—	—	—	—	—
2007–08	Edmonton Oilers	NHL	81	14	22	36	74	—	—	—	—	—
2008–09	Los Angeles Kings	NHL	78	18	23	41	68	—	—	—	—	—
2009–10	Los Angeles Kings	NHL	73	16	31	47	40	6	1	0	1	4
2010–11	Los Angeles Kings	NHL	82	20	23	43	42	5	0	3	3	0
2011–12	Los Angeles Kings	NHL	78	6	15	21	60	20	2	3	5	18
2012–13	Los Angeles Kings	NHL	48	7	11	18	28	12	0	1	1	4
2013–14	Los Angeles Kings	NHL	78	8	19	27	48	26	3	3	6	18
2014–15	Los Angeles Kings	NHL	73	6	11	17	58	—	—	—	—	—
2015–16	New York Rangers	NHL	29	1	2	3	20	—	—	—	—	—
2015–16	Minnesota Wild	NHL	51	3	3	6	16	4	0	0	0	4
NHL totals			872	144	244	388	618	97	10	16	26	72

=== International ===
Year	Team	Event	Result	GP	G	A	Pts	PIM
1999	Canada	U18	1st place, gold medalist(s)	3	1	3	4	0
2001	Canada	WJC	3rd place, bronze medalist(s)	7	0	2	2	6
2002	Canada	WJC	2nd place, silver medalist(s)	7	2	4	6	4
Junior totals				17	3	9	12	10

== Awards and honours ==
Award	Year	Ref
WHL
East First Team All-Star	2001	
West First All-Star Team	2002	
NHL
Stanley Cup champion	2012, 2014	
