= Mark Fayne =

American ice hockey player (born 1987)

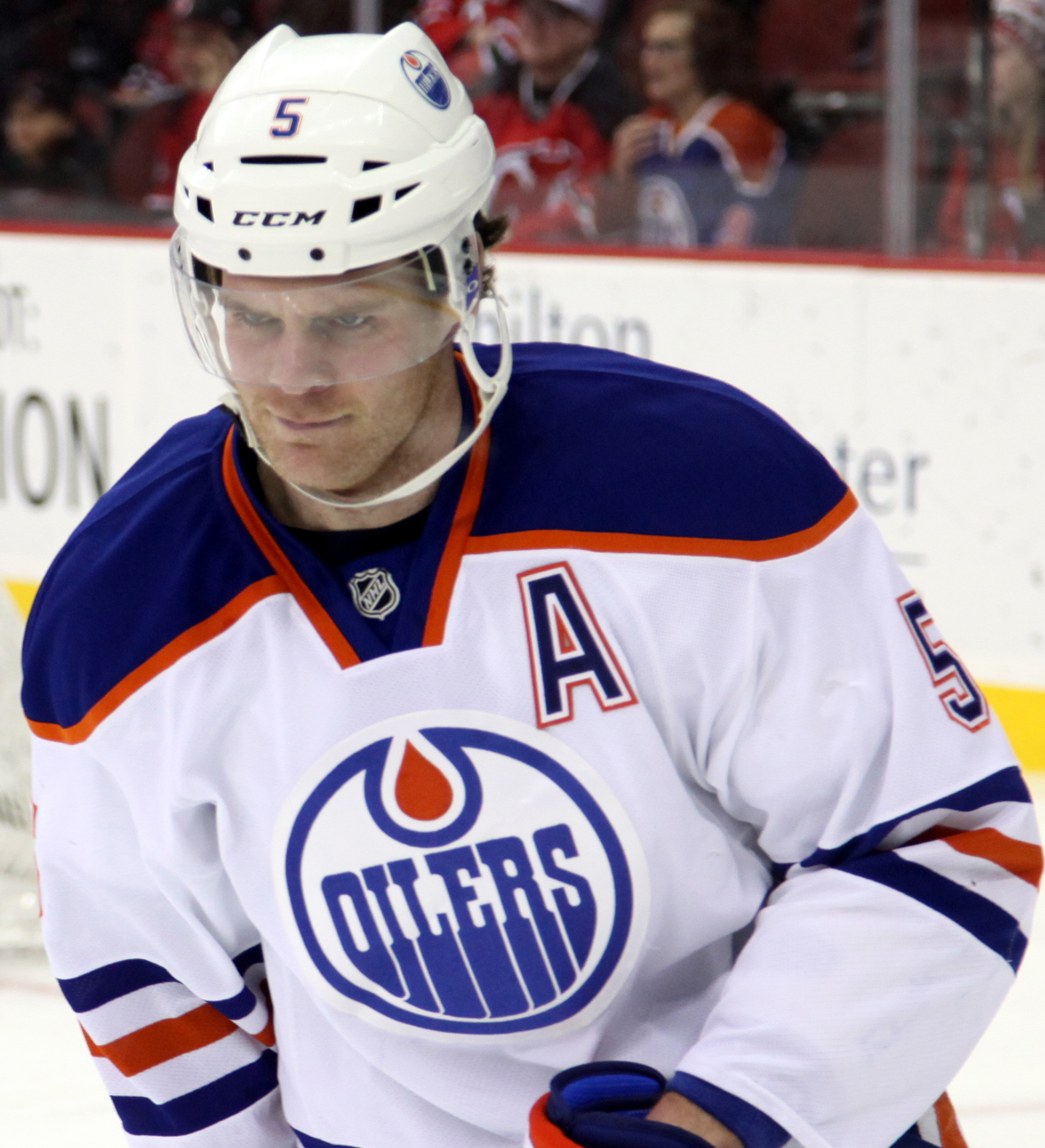
- Fayne with the Edmonton Oilers in 2015
- Born: May 15, 1987 (age 39) Nashua, New Hampshire, U.S.
- Height: 6 ft 3 in (191 cm)
- Weight: 215 lb (98 kg; 15 st 5 lb)
- Position: Defense
- Shot: Right
- Played for: New Jersey Devils; Edmonton Oilers
- National team: United States
- NHL draft: 155th overall, 2005; New Jersey Devils
- Playing career: 2010–2018

Mark C. Fayne (born May 15, 1987) is an American former professional ice hockey player. He played with the New Jersey Devils and Edmonton Oilers of the National Hockey League (NHL). He was selected by the Devils in the 5th round (155th overall) of the 2005 NHL entry draft.

== Playing career ==
=== Early career ===
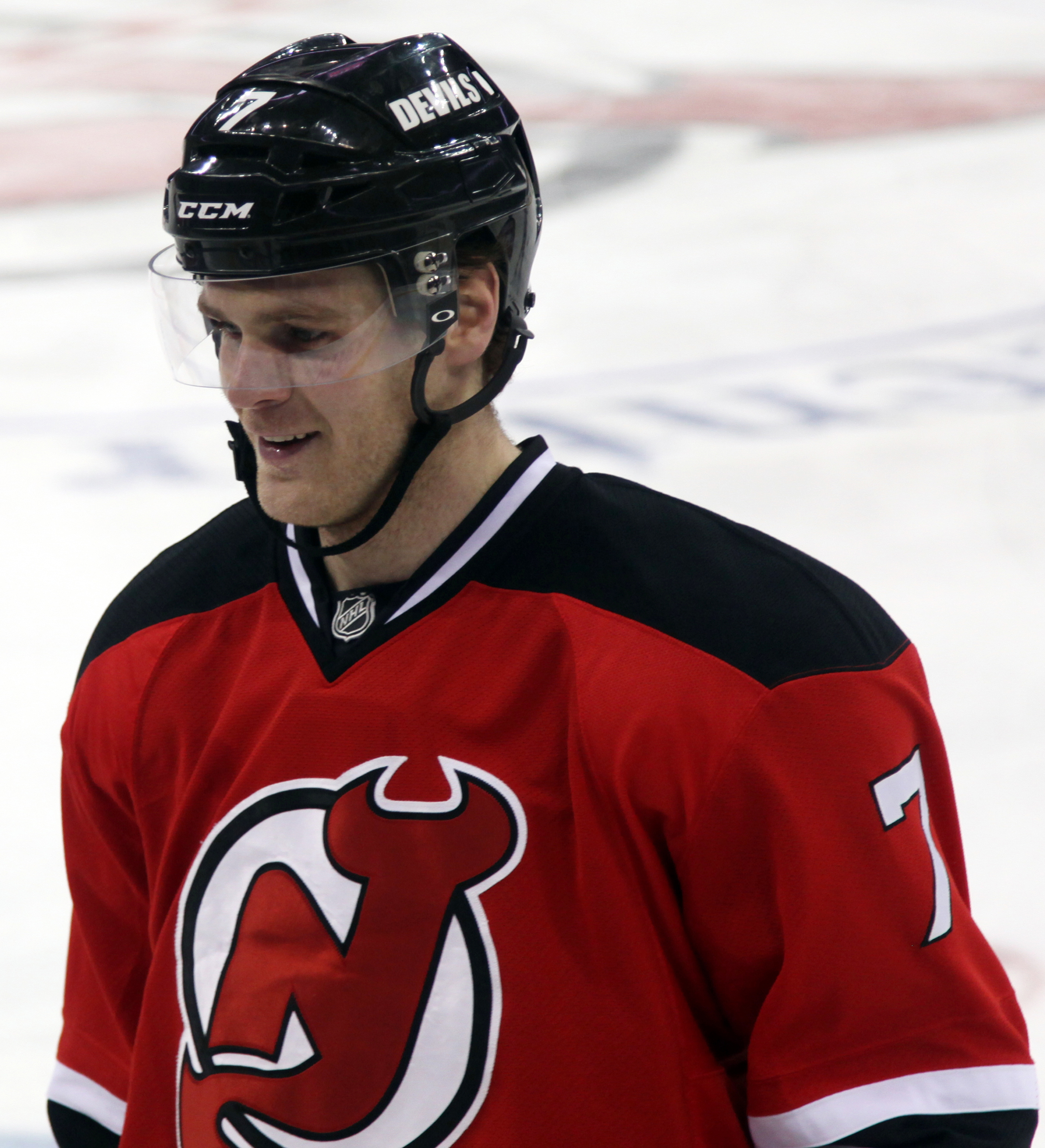
Fayne in 2014.

Fayne was born in Nashua, New Hampshire and raised in Bourne, Massachusetts. He attended Providence College where he played four seasons (2006–10) of Hockey East college hockey. Before Providence College, he played hockey for the prestigious Noble and Greenough School under the coaching of Brian Day.

=== New Jersey Devils ===
Turning professional for the 2010–11 season, Fayne had played only 16 games for the Devils' AHL affiliate Albany Devils before receiving an emergency call-up to the NHL on November 22, 2010. He scored his first NHL goal in his 10th game on December 15, 2010 against Ilya Bryzgalov of the Phoenix Coyotes.

On July 20, 2012, Fayne signed a two-year deal worth $2.6 million in order to remain with the Devils. Fayne played in 31 out of the lockout shortened 48 games during the 2012-13 New Jersey Devils season, largely due to injuries (including wrist surgery to repair a torn ligament just prior to the season, and a season ending "bulging disc" in his lower back). He played in 71 games during the 2013-14 New Jersey Devils season.

=== Edmonton Oilers ===
On July 1, 2014, Fayne signed a four-year $14 million contract with the Edmonton Oilers after becoming an unrestricted free agent.

Entering the final year of his contract with the Oilers, and having failed to play up to expectations, Fayne began the season in the AHL, continuing his tenure with affiliate, the Bakersfield Condors. He appeared in just 6 games with the Condors in the 2017–18 campaign before he was loaned to fellow AHL club, the Springfield Thunderbirds on December 19, 2017. In order for the Thunderbirds to accept Fayne, their NHL affiliate the Florida Panthers also acquired Greg Chase from the Oilers.

On September 4, 2018, Fayne was invited to attend the Boston Bruins' training camp on a professional tryout agreement.

== Career statistics ==
=== Regular season and playoffs ===
			Regular season					Playoffs
Season	Team	League	GP	G	A	Pts	PIM	GP	G	A	Pts	PIM
2003–04	Noble & Greenough School	HS-Prep	20	3	5	8	14	—	—	—	—	—
2004–05	Noble & Greenough School	HS-Prep	24	1	17	18	16	—	—	—	—	—
2005–06	Noble & Greenough School	HS-Prep	29	10	24	34	18	—	—	—	—	—
2006–07	Providence College	HE	36	5	7	12	43	—	—	—	—	—
2007–08	Providence College	HE	36	2	4	6	18	—	—	—	—	—
2008–09	Providence College	HE	33	4	5	9	30	—	—	—	—	—
2009–10	Providence College	HE	34	5	17	22	14	—	—	—	—	—
2010–11	Albany Devils	AHL	19	1	3	4	6	—	—	—	—	—
2010–11	New Jersey Devils	NHL	57	4	10	14	27	—	—	—	—	—
2011–12	New Jersey Devils	NHL	82	4	13	17	26	24	0	3	3	6
2012–13	New Jersey Devils	NHL	31	1	5	6	16	—	—	—	—	—
2013–14	New Jersey Devils	NHL	72	4	7	11	30	—	—	—	—	—
2014–15	Edmonton Oilers	NHL	74	2	6	8	14	—	—	—	—	—
2015–16	Edmonton Oilers	NHL	69	2	5	7	18	—	—	—	—	—
2015–16	Bakersfield Condors	AHL	4	0	1	1	4	—	—	—	—	—
2016–17	Edmonton Oilers	NHL	4	0	2	2	0	—	—	—	—	—
2016–17	Bakersfield Condors	AHL	39	3	14	17	16	—	—	—	—	—
2017–18	Bakersfield Condors	AHL	6	0	1	1	4	—	—	—	—	—
2017–18	Springfield Thunderbirds	AHL	39	3	2	5	4	—	—	—	—	—
NHL totals			389	17	48	65	131	24	0	3	3	6

=== International ===
Year	Team	Event	Result	GP	G	A	Pts	PIM
2011	United States	WC	8th	4	0	1	1	0
Senior totals				4	0	1	1	0

== Awards and honors ==
Award	Year
College
All-Hockey East Rookie Team	2006–07
