= Brad Richardson =

Canadian ice hockey player (born 1985)

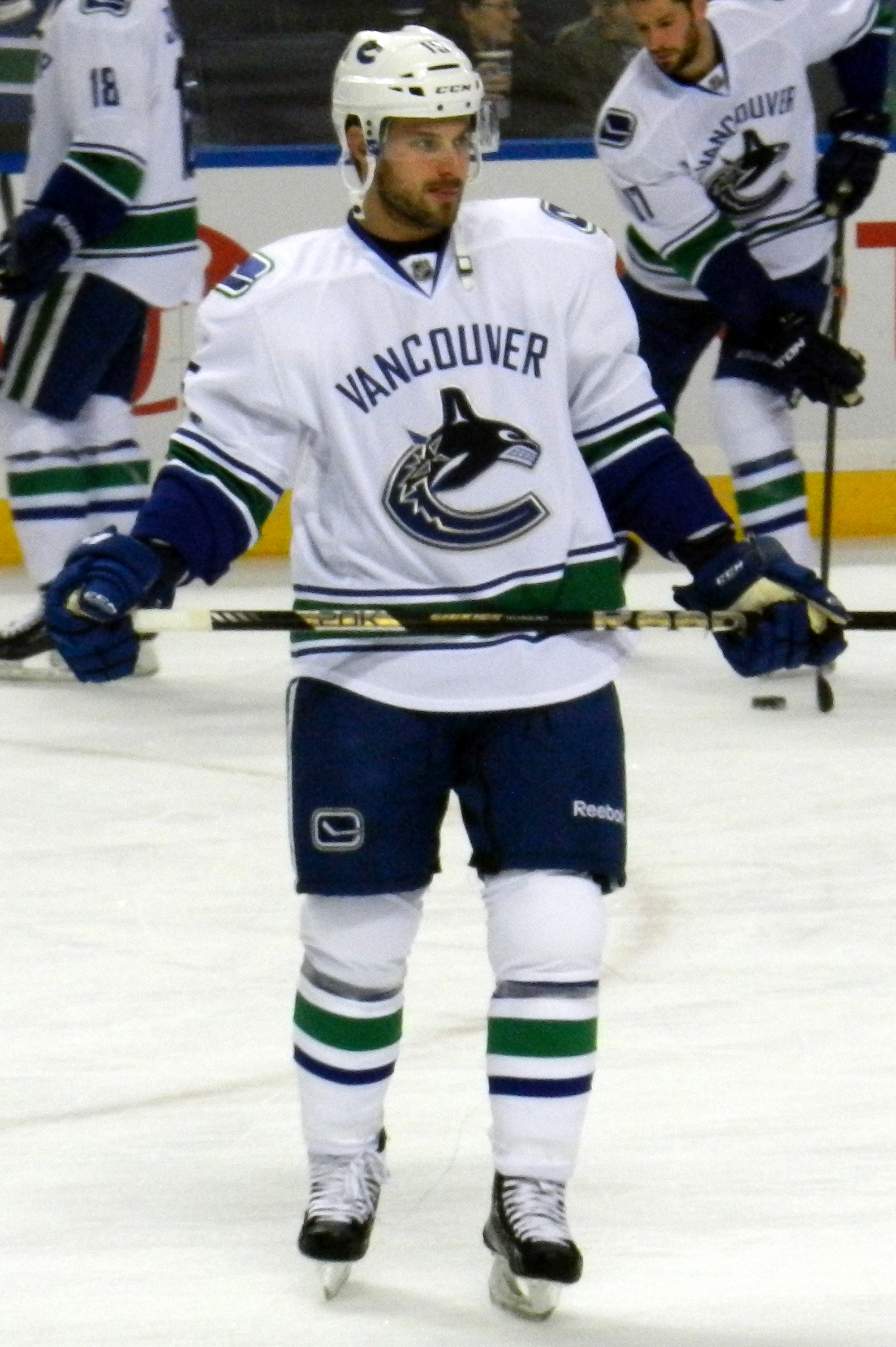
- Richardson with the Vancouver Canucks in October 2013
- Born: February 4, 1985 (age 41) Belleville, Ontario, Canada
- Height: 6 ft 0 in (183 cm)
- Weight: 191 lb (87 kg; 13 st 9 lb)
- Position: Forward
- Shot: Left
- Played for: Colorado Avalanche; Los Angeles Kings; Vancouver Canucks; Arizona Coyotes; Nashville Predators; Calgary Flames
- NHL draft: 163rd overall, 2003; Colorado Avalanche
- Playing career: 2005–2022

Bradley Benjamin Stanley Richardson (born February 4, 1985) is a Canadian former professional ice hockey forward. He played for the Colorado Avalanche, Los Angeles Kings, Vancouver Canucks, Arizona Coyotes, Nashville Predators and the Calgary Flames. Richardson won the Stanley Cup with the Kings in 2012.

== Playing career ==
Richardson grew up in Belleville, Ontario playing minor ice hockey for the AA Belleville Bobcats and eventually for the AAA Quinte Red Devils of the OMHA. He played in the 1998 Quebec International Pee-Wee Hockey Tournament with the Quinte team. After a strong season in Bantam, Richardson was the 1st round choice (10th overall) in the 2001 OHL Priority Selection by the Owen Sound Attack.

Richardson was drafted by the Colorado Avalanche in the 2003 NHL entry draft. He was the chosen 163rd overall in the 5th round from the Owen Sound Attack of the Ontario Hockey League. Brad played his first professional season in the 2005–06 season, splitting the year between the Lowell Lock Monsters of the AHL and making his debut in the NHL with the Avalanche.

Richardson's best year with the Avalanche came in the 2006–07 season, playing in a career high 73 games, recording 14 goals and 22 points.

On June 21, 2008, Richardson was traded from the Avalanche to the Los Angeles Kings for a second round pick. On September 15, 2008, Richardson signed with the Kings for two years and $1.175 million. Richardson achieved his first career hat trick on October 23, 2010, against his old team, the Colorado Avalanche, in a 6-4 Kings victory.

On July 12, 2011, Richardson re-signed on a two-year contract extension worth $2.35 million with the Kings. In the 2011–12 season, in a utility role he played in 59 regular season games for 9 points before capturing the Stanley Cup with the Kings whilst featuring in 13 post-season games. Richardson missed the first two post-season games that year after undergoing an emergency appendectomy.

On July 5, 2013, Richardson signed as a free agent to a two-year contract worth $1.15 million per year by the Vancouver Canucks.

Richardson as a free agent for the second time in his career, signed a three-year contract with the Arizona Coyotes on July 1, 2015. On November 17, 2016, in the midst of a productive start to his second season with the Coyotes, having 9 points in 16 appearances, he was hit by defenceman Nikita Tryamkin in a game against his former club, the Vancouver Canucks. He fractured both his tibia and fibula bones in his right leg, requiring season ending surgery.

On July 3, 2018, Richardson re-signed with the Coyotes on a two-year deal worth $2.5 million. During the qualifying round of the 2020 Stanley Cup playoffs, Richardson scored an overtime goal that clinched the series over the Nashville Predators.

On October 12, 2020, having left the Coyotes as a free agent after five seasons, Richardson was signed to a one year, $1 million contract with the Nashville Predators. In the pandemic delayed and shortened 2020–21 season, Richardson was limited through injury to just 17 regular season games with the Predators, collecting 1 goal and 4 points. He was scoreless in 2 playoff contests in a first-round defeat to the Carolina Hurricanes.

On September 8, 2021, Richardson signed as a free agent to a one-year, $800,000 contract with the Calgary Flames. In the 2021–22 season, Richardson in a limited role made 27 regular season appearances with the Flames. At the NHL trade deadline Richardson was placed on waivers by the Flames and was claimed in a return to the Vancouver Canucks on March 21, 2022. His 4 goals and 8 points were evenly split between the Flames and the Canucks.

== Personal life ==
In January 2021, Richardson's girlfriend, actress Jessica Szohr, gave birth to their daughter, Bowie Ella Richardson. On May 16, 2022, Brad Richardson and Jessica Szohr got engaged. They married in August 2024.

== Career statistics ==
			Regular season					Playoffs
Season	Team	League	GP	G	A	Pts	PIM	GP	G	A	Pts	PIM
2001–02	Wellington Dukes	OPJHL	1	0	0	0	0	—	—	—	—	—
2001–02	Owen Sound Attack	OHL	58	12	21	33	20	—	—	—	—	—
2002–03	Owen Sound Attack	OHL	67	27	40	67	54	4	1	1	2	10
2003–04	Owen Sound Attack	OHL	15	7	9	16	4	—	—	—	—	—
2004–05	Owen Sound Attack	OHL	68	41	56	97	60	8	6	4	10	8
2005–06	Colorado Avalanche	NHL	41	3	10	13	12	9	1	0	1	6
2005–06	Lowell Lock Monsters	AHL	29	4	13	17	20	—	—	—	—	—
2006–07	Colorado Avalanche	NHL	73	14	8	22	28	—	—	—	—	—
2006–07	Albany River Rats	AHL	3	0	1	1	2	—	—	—	—	—
2007–08	Colorado Avalanche	NHL	22	2	3	5	8	—	—	—	—	—
2007–08	Lake Erie Monsters	AHL	38	14	26	40	18	—	—	—	—	—
2008–09	Los Angeles Kings	NHL	31	0	5	5	11	—	—	—	—	—
2008–09	Manchester Monarchs	AHL	3	1	2	3	0	—	—	—	—	—
2009–10	Los Angeles Kings	NHL	81	11	16	27	37	6	1	1	2	2
2010–11	Los Angeles Kings	NHL	68	7	12	19	47	6	2	3	5	2
2011–12	Los Angeles Kings	NHL	59	5	3	8	30	13	1	0	1	4
2012–13	Los Angeles Kings	NHL	16	1	5	6	10	11	0	1	1	0
2013–14	Vancouver Canucks	NHL	73	11	12	23	39	—	—	—	—	—
2014–15	Vancouver Canucks	NHL	45	8	13	21	34	5	0	0	0	15
2015–16	Arizona Coyotes	NHL	82	11	20	31	46	—	—	—	—	—
2016–17	Arizona Coyotes	NHL	16	5	4	9	15	—	—	—	—	—
2017–18	Arizona Coyotes	NHL	76	3	12	15	45	—	—	—	—	—
2018–19	Arizona Coyotes	NHL	66	19	8	27	22	—	—	—	—	—
2019–20	Arizona Coyotes	NHL	59	6	5	11	20	9	2	1	3	4
2020–21	Nashville Predators	NHL	17	1	3	4	4	2	0	0	0	0
2021–22	Calgary Flames	NHL	27	2	2	4	27	—	—	—	—	—
2021–22	Vancouver Canucks	NHL	17	2	2	4	8	—	—	—	—	—
NHL totals			869	111	143	254	443	61	7	6	13	33

== Awards and honours ==
Award	Year
OHL
Third All-Star Team	2005
NHL
Stanley Cup champion	2012
