= David Clarkson (ice hockey) =

Canadian ice hockey player and coach

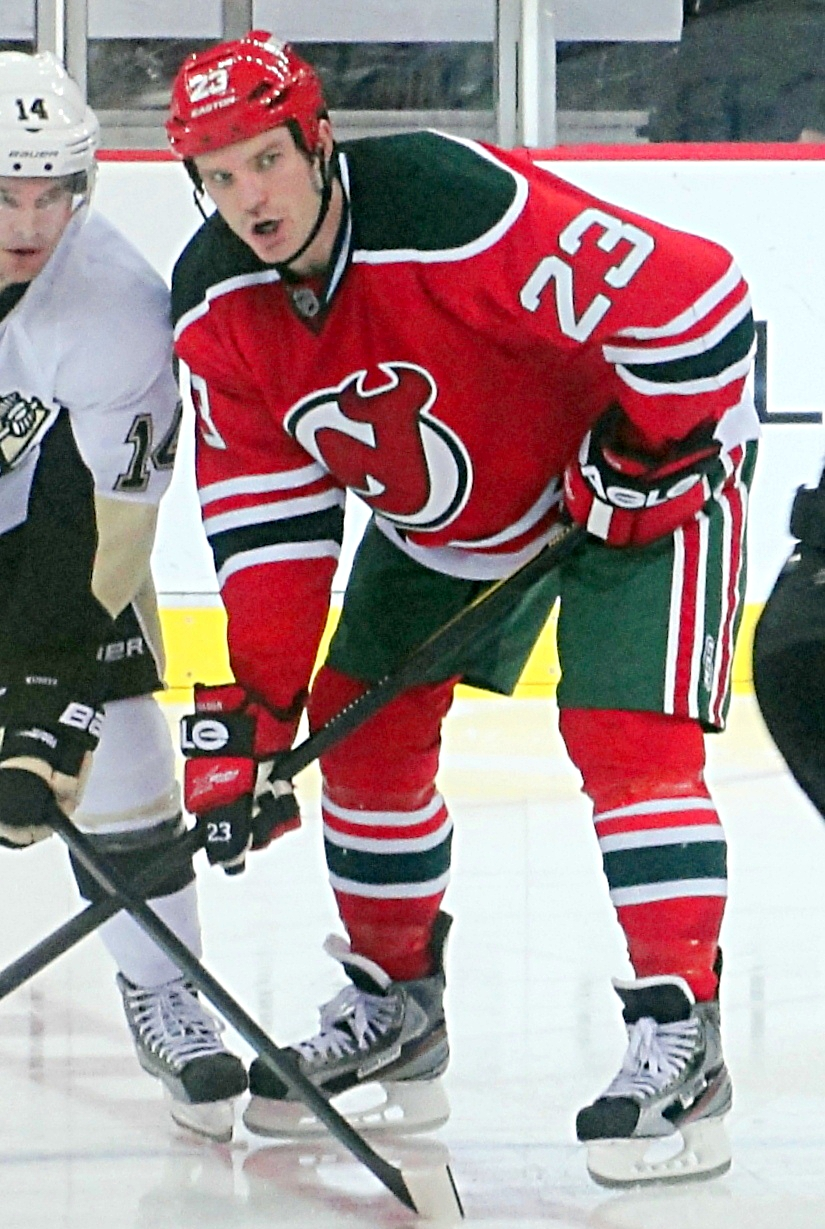
- Clarkson with the New Jersey Devils in 2012
- Born: March 31, 1984 (age 42) Etobicoke, Ontario, Canada
- Height: 6 ft 1 in (185 cm)
- Weight: 200 lb (91 kg; 14 st 4 lb)
- Position: Right wing
- Shot: Right
- Played for: New Jersey Devils; Toronto Maple Leafs; Columbus Blue Jackets
- NHL draft: Undrafted
- Playing career: 2005–2016

David Clarkson (born March 31, 1984) is a Canadian professional ice hockey coach and former player. He played 10 seasons in the National Hockey League for the New Jersey Devils, Toronto Maple Leafs, and Columbus Blue Jackets. He is currently part owner and director of player development for the Colorado Grit in the NAHL south division. Clarkson was a member of the 2003 Memorial Cup-winning Kitchener Rangers.

== Playing career ==
=== Junior hockey ===
As a youth, Clarkson played in the 1998 Quebec International Pee-Wee Hockey Tournament with the Toronto Marlboros minor ice hockey team. Clarkson attended Norsemen Junior Middle School and Etobicoke Collegiate, then joined the Belleville Bulls of the Ontario Hockey League (OHL) for his major junior career. He was traded to the Kitchener Rangers of the OHL on October 6, 2002 for future considerations. Clarkson spent three seasons with the Rangers, during which he won the Memorial Cup in 2003.

=== Professional career ===
Following his junior ice hockey career, Clarkson went undrafted and was signed as a free agent by the New Jersey Devils on August 12, 2005. He was assigned to the Albany River Rats of the American Hockey League (AHL) in September for the 2005–06 AHL season. He would go on to play the majority of the 2006–07 AHL season with the Devils' new minor league team, the Lowell Devils (also of the AHL), before receiving a late-season call-up to New Jersey.

Clarkson made his NHL debut on March 15, 2007, on the road against the Carolina Hurricanes. He scored his first NHL goal on John Grahame one game later in a 7–2 loss to Carolina at home. He played in 81 games in the 2007–08 season with the Devils, registering 9 goals and 22 points. Clarkson was top on his team in penalty minutes (183) during the season. Clarkson played in the YoungStars Game during the 56th NHL All-Star Game SuperSkills Competition, scoring one goal and two assists. He was the lone Devils' representative at the festivities, as Martin Brodeur (who had been voted in to the All-Star Team) was unable to participate. On July 1, as a restricted free agent, Clarkson was re-signed by the Devils for two years at $800,000 per year. Clarkson played in all 82 games during the 2008–09 season, scoring 17 goals. The following season, Clarkson played in only 46 games, missing a large part of the year with a broken leg. He scored 11 goals and 24 points. In the off-season he re-signed with the Devils to a three-year deal.

Clarkson broke out in the 2011–12 season under head coach Peter DeBoer who had coached him in Kitchener. He scored a career-high 30 goals and 48 points and the Devils went on to the Stanley Cup Final. The Devils would lose in the finals to the Kings. As the 2012–13 NHL lockout began, Clarkson signed with Austrian team EC Red Bull Salzburg to begin the 2012–13 season. Once the NHL lock-out was settled, he returned to the Devils and did well offensively, scoring 15 goals though New Jersey failed to the make the playoffs.

An unrestricted free agent, Clarkson did not re-sign with the Devils during the off-season, instead signing a seven-year, $36.75 million contract with the Toronto Maple Leafs on July 5, 2013. On September 22, 2013, a brawl erupted during a pre-season game against the Buffalo Sabres during which Clarkson left the bench to fight. He subsequently received an automatic ten-game suspension from the NHL. There were high expectations in Toronto that Clarkson would score 20 to 30 goals based on his contract. Clarkson made his debut with the Maple Leafs on October 26, 2013 in a 5–2 loss to the Columbus Blue Jackets. He scored his first goal with Toronto against the New York Islanders's goalie Kevin Poulin on November 20. Clarkson was suspended for a second time that season, sitting out two games after hitting Vladimir Sobotka of the St. Louis Blues in the head. He ended his first season in Toronto with 5 goals and 11 points in 60 games. During the 2014–15 pre-season, Clarkson fought Cody McCormick and suffered a facial injury that required visiting a specialist. In the midst of his second season with the Maple Leafs, unable to establish a level of play to match his contract and plagued by injuries, Clarkson was traded by Toronto to the Columbus Blue Jackets in exchange for Nathan Horton on February 26, 2015. In total, Clarkson played 118 games with the Leafs over two years, scoring 15 goals and 26 points.

Healthy scratches and injuries would hold Clarkson to only 26 games with the Blue Jackets over the next year and a half, registering only 4 points. As training camp for the 2016–17 season approached, it was announced that Clarkson had failed a physical and would not be invited to practice with the Blue Jackets. He was placed on the long-term injured reserve due to serious back injuries. Clarkson never played again in the NHL due to an injury suffered in March 2016 with the Blue Jackets. On June 21, 2017, Clarkson's contract, along with first-round and second-round draft picks were obtained by the Vegas Golden Knights at the 2017 NHL expansion draft in a pre-arranged trade with the Blue Jackets in order for the Golden Knights to select William Karlsson. The Blue Jackets needed space under the salary cap and needed to protect other prospects in the expansion draft. On July 23, 2019, Clarkson, along with a 2020 fourth-round pick, was traded back to the Maple Leafs in exchange for goaltender Garret Sparks. He was placed on injured reserve to clear up cap space for the Leafs.

== Personal life ==
Clarkson was born in Etobicoke, Ontario, growing up in the Mimico neighbourhood. He and his wife Brittney have five children – three daughters and two sons. The family resides in Castle Pines, Colorado. Clarkson volunteered in 2017 as an assistant coach for the Upper Arlington High School hockey team, in Upper Arlington, Ohio, before taking on the head coaching job the following year.

== Career statistics ==
			Regular season					Playoffs
Season	Team	League	GP	G	A	Pts	PIM	GP	G	A	Pts	PIM
2000–01	Port Hope Clippers	OPJHL	47	18	14	32	118	—	—	—	—	—
2001–02	Belleville Bulls	OHL	22	2	7	9	34	8	1	1	2	6
2001–02	Aurora Tigers	OPJHL	37	26	21	47	141	—	—	—	—	—
2002–03	Belleville Bulls	OHL	3	0	0	0	11	—	—	—	—	—
2002–03	Kitchener Rangers	OHL	54	17	11	28	122	21	4	3	7	23
2003–04	Kitchener Rangers	OHL	55	22	17	39	173	—	—	—	—	—
2004–05	Kitchener Rangers	OHL	31	33	21	54	145	15	6	2	8	40
2005–06	Albany River Rats	AHL	56	13	21	34	233	—	—	—	—	—
2006–07	Lowell Devils	AHL	67	20	18	38	150	—	—	—	—	—
2006–07	New Jersey Devils	NHL	7	3	1	4	6	3	0	0	0	2
2007–08	New Jersey Devils	NHL	81	9	13	22	183	5	0	0	0	4
2008–09	New Jersey Devils	NHL	82	17	15	32	164	7	2	0	2	19
2009–10	New Jersey Devils	NHL	46	11	13	24	85	5	0	0	0	2
2010–11	New Jersey Devils	NHL	82	12	6	18	116	—	—	—	—	—
2011–12	New Jersey Devils	NHL	80	30	16	46	138	24	3	9	12	32
2012–13	EC Red Bull Salzburg	EBEL	5	2	1	3	18	—	—	—	—	—
2012–13	New Jersey Devils	NHL	48	15	9	24	78	—	—	—	—	—
2013–14	Toronto Maple Leafs	NHL	60	5	6	11	93	—	—	—	—	—
2014–15	Toronto Maple Leafs	NHL	58	10	5	15	92	—	—	—	—	—
2014–15	Columbus Blue Jackets	NHL	3	0	0	0	14	—	—	—	—	—
2015–16	Columbus Blue Jackets	NHL	23	2	2	4	23	—	—	—	—	—
NHL totals			570	114	86	200	992	44	5	9	14	59

== Awards and honours ==
Award	Year
CHL
Memorial Cup (Kitchener Rangers)	2003
NHL
NHL YoungStars Game	2008
