= 2011–12 NHL suspensions and fines =

The following is a list of all suspensions and fines enforced in the National Hockey League during the 2011–12 NHL season. It lists players and coaches (by team), their offense, and the punishments they received. During the regular season, the Vancouver Canucks was the only team that did not have any players or staff suspended or fined.

== Suspensions ==
† - suspension covered at least one pre-season game

‡ - suspension covered at least one post-season game

* - suspension carried over to 2012–13 season

Date of Incident	Offender	Team	Offense	Date of Action	Length
September 20, 2011	Pierre-Luc Letourneau-Leblond	Calgary Flames	Boarding Matt Clackson.	September 22, 2011	5 games† (4 pre-season, 1 regular season)
September 21, 2011	Jody Shelley	Philadelphia Flyers	Boarding Darryl Boyce.	September 22, 2011	10 games† (5 pre-season, 5 regular season)
September 23, 2011	James Wisniewski	Columbus Blue Jackets	Illegal hit to the head of Cal Clutterbuck.	September 24, 2011	12 games† (4 pre-season, 8 regular season)
September 23, 2011	Brad Staubitz	Minnesota Wild	Checking Cody Bass from behind.	September 26, 2011	7 games† (4 pre-season, 3 regular season)
September 24, 2011	Brad Boyes	Buffalo Sabres	Illegal hit to the head of Joe Colborne.	September 25, 2011	2 games† (2 pre-season)
September 24, 2011	Jean-Francois Jacques	Anaheim Ducks	Leaving bench to initiate a fight with Mike Duco.	September 27, 2011	9 games† (4 pre-season, 5 regular season)
September 26, 2011	Tom Sestito	Philadelphia Flyers	Checking Andre Deveaux from behind.	September 28, 2011	4 games† (2 pre-season, 2 regular season)
September 28, 2011	Brendan Smith	Detroit Red Wings	Illegal hit to the head of Ben Smith.	September 30, 2011	8 games† (3 pre-season, 5 regular season)
September 30, 2011	Clarke MacArthur	Toronto Maple Leafs	Illegal hit to the head of Justin Abdelkader.	October 1, 2011	3 games† (1 pre-season, 2 regular season)
October 8, 2011	Pierre-Marc Bouchard	Minnesota Wild	High sticking Matt Calvert.	October 9, 2011	2 games
October 17, 2011	Kris Letang	Pittsburgh Penguins	Boarding Alexander Burmistrov.	October 18, 2011	2 games
October 28, 2011	Andy Sutton	Edmonton Oilers	Elbowing Gabriel Landeskog.	November 1, 2011	5 games
October 28, 2011	Daniel Carcillo	Chicago Blackhawks	Hit from behind on Joni Pitkanen.	October 29, 2011	2 games
November 2, 2011	Patrick Kaleta	Buffalo Sabres	Headbutt on Jakub Voracek.	November 3, 2011	4 games
November 17, 2011	Chris Stewart	St. Louis Blues	Checking Niklas Kronwall from behind.	November 18, 2011	3 games
November 23, 2011	Andre Deveaux	New York Rangers	Illegal hit to the head of Tomas Fleischmann.	November 23, 2011	3 games
November 26, 2011	Max Pacioretty	Montreal Canadiens	Illegal hit to the head of Kris Letang.	November 28, 2011	3 games
December 3, 2011	Jordin Tootoo	Nashville Predators	Charging goaltender Ryan Miller.	December 6, 2011	2 games
December 3, 2011	Mark Fistric	Dallas Stars	Charging Nino Niederreiter.	December 7, 2011	3 games
December 6, 2011	Kevin Porter	Colorado Avalanche	Kneeing David Booth.	December 8, 2011	4 games
December 7, 2011	Ville Leino	Buffalo Sabres	Elbowing Matt Read.	December 8, 2011	1 game
December 7, 2011	Andy Sutton	Edmonton Oilers	Charging Alexei Ponikarovsky.	December 8, 2011	8 games
December 17, 2011	Milan Lucic	Boston Bruins	Checking Zac Rinaldo from behind.	December 19, 2011	1 game
December 18, 2011	Rene Bourque	Calgary Flames	Checking Brent Seabrook from behind.	December 19, 2011	2 games
December 20, 2011	Deryk Engelland	Pittsburgh Penguins	Illegal hit to the head of Marcus Kruger.	December 22, 2011	3 games
December 31, 2011	Ian Cole	St. Louis Blues	Illegal hit to the head of Justin Abdelkader.	January 1, 2012	3 games
December 31, 2011	Krys Barch	Florida Panthers	Insensitive comments directed at P. K. Subban	January 5, 2012	1 game
December 31, 2011	Raffi Torres	Phoenix Coyotes	Charging Nate Prosser	January 2, 2012	2 games
January 2, 2012	Daniel Carcillo	Chicago Blackhawks	Boarding Tom Gilbert	January 4, 2012	7 games
January 3, 2012	Rene Bourque	Calgary Flames	Elbowing Nicklas Backstrom.	January 4, 2012	5 games
January 7, 2012	Brad Marchand	Boston Bruins	Clipping Sami Salo.	January 9, 2012	5 games
January 8, 2012	Jean-Francois Jacques	Anaheim Ducks	Illegal hit to the head of R. J. Umberger.	January 9, 2012	3 games
January 14, 2012	Dane Byers	Columbus Blue Jackets	Illegal hit to the head of Andrew Desjardins.	January 16, 2012	3 games
January 21, 2012	Andrew Ference	Boston Bruins	Boarding Ryan McDonagh.	January 22, 2012	3 games
January 22, 2012	Alexander Ovechkin	Washington Capitals	Charging Zbynek Michalek.	January 23, 2012	3 games
February 12, 2012	Zac Rinaldo	Philadelphia Flyers	Charging Jonathan Ericsson.	February 13, 2012	2 games
February 18, 2012	Warren Peters	Minnesota Wild	Cross-checking David Backes.	February 19, 2012	1 game
March 8, 2012	Mike Green	Washington Capitals	Illegal hit to the head of Brett Connolly.	March 9, 2012	3 games
March 12, 2012	Tyler Myers	Buffalo Sabres	Boarding Scott Gomez.	March 13, 2012	3 games
March 15, 2012	Jeff Skinner	Carolina Hurricanes	Kicking Scott Nichol.	March 16, 2012	2 games
March 20, 2012	Shane Doan	Phoenix Coyotes	Elbowing Jamie Benn.	March 21, 2012	3 games
March 21, 2012	Duncan Keith	Chicago Blackhawks	Elbowing Daniel Sedin.	March 23, 2012	5 games
April 1, 2012	Kyle Quincey	Detroit Red Wings	Charging Tomas Kopecky.	April 2, 2012	1 game
April 5, 2012	Nate Prosser	Minnesota Wild	Head-butting Jamal Mayers.	April 6, 2012	1 game
April 11, 2012	Byron Bitz	Vancouver Canucks	Boarding Kyle Clifford.	April 12, 2012	2 games‡ (2 post-season)
April 14, 2012	Carl Hagelin	New York Rangers	Elbowing Daniel Alfredsson.	April 15, 2012	3 games‡ (3 post-season)
April 14, 2012	Matt Carkner	Ottawa Senators	Aggressing an unwilling Brian Boyle.	April 15, 2012	1 game‡ (1 post-season)
April 14, 2012	Andrew Shaw	Chicago Blackhawks	Charging goaltender Mike Smith.	April 17, 2012	3 games‡ (3 post-season)
April 15, 2012	Craig Adams	Pittsburgh Penguins	Instigator penalty in the last five minutes of a game.	April 16, 2012	1 game‡ (1 post-season)
April 15, 2012	James Neal	Pittsburgh Penguins	Charging Claude Giroux.	April 17, 2012	1 game‡ (1 post-season)
April 15, 2012	Arron Asham	Pittsburgh Penguins	Cross-checking Brayden Schenn.	April 17, 2012	4 games‡ (3 post-season)*
April 14, 2012	Nicklas Backstrom	Washington Capitals	Cross-checking Rich Peverley.	April 17, 2012	1 game‡ (1 post-season)
April 17, 2012	Raffi Torres	Phoenix Coyotes	Late charge to the head of Marian Hossa.	April 21, 2012	25 games reduced to 21 games‡ (13 post-season)*
May 4, 2012	Rostislav Klesla	Phoenix Coyotes	Boarding Matthew Halischuk.	May 6, 2012	1 game‡ (1 post-season)
May 6, 2012	Claude Giroux	Philadelphia Flyers	Illegal hit to the head of Dainius Zubrus.	May 7, 2012	1 game‡ (1 post-season)
May 15, 2012	Martin Hanzal	Phoenix Coyotes	Boarding Dustin Brown.	May 16, 2012	1 game‡ (1 post-season)
May 20, 2012	Brandon Prust	New York Rangers	Elbowing Anton Volchenkov.	May 20, 2012	1 game‡ (1 post-season)

== Fines ==
Date of Incident	Offender	Team	Offense	Date of Action	Amount
October 7, 2011	Mats Zuccarello	New York Rangers	Boarding Kyle Clifford.	October 7, 2011	$2,500 U.S.
October 20, 2011	Shea Weber	Nashville Predators	Boarding Jannik Hansen.	October 21, 2011	$2,500 U.S.
November 5, 2011	Ethan Moreau	Los Angeles Kings	Boarding Chris Kunitz.	November 6, 2011	$2,500 U.S.
November 19, 2011	Patrick Kaleta	Buffalo Sabres	High-sticking Derek Morris.	November 21, 2011	$2,500 U.S.
November 19, 2011	Ryane Clowe	San Jose Sharks	Slashing Stephane Robidas.	November 21, 2011	$2,500 U.S.
November 22, 2011	Drew Doughty	Los Angeles Kings	Cross-checking T. J. Oshie.	November 23, 2011	$2,500 U.S.
November 25, 2011	John Tavares	New York Islanders	Slashing Zach Parise.	November 25, 2011	$2,500 U.S.
November 27, 2011	James Neal	Pittsburgh Penguins	High-sticking P. K. Subban.	November 29, 2011	$2,500 U.S.
December 3, 2011	Lars Eller	Montreal Canadiens	Boarding Drew Doughty.	December 10, 2011	$2,500 U.S.
December 5, 2011	Brad Marchand	Boston Bruins	Slew-footing Matt Niskanen.	December 12, 2011	$2,500 U.S.
December 8, 2011	Steve Downie	Tampa Bay Lightning	Leaving the bench to partake in a fight.	December 13, 2011	$2,500 U.S.
December 14, 2011	Adam McQuaid	Boston Bruins	Kneeing Nick Foligno.	December 15, 2011	$2,500 U.S.
December 29, 2011	Raffi Torres	Phoenix Coyotes	Elbowing Jan Hejda.	December 31, 2011	$2,500 U.S.
December 30, 2011	Michael Del Zotto	New York Rangers	Cross checking Tomas Kopecky.	December 31, 2011	$2,500 U.S.
December 30, 2011	Tomas Kopecky	Florida Panthers	Sucker punching Michael Del Zotto.	December 31, 2011	$2,500 U.S.
December 30, 2011	Cory Sarich	Calgary Flames	Illegal hit to the head of Erik Condra.	January 1, 2012	$2,500 U.S.
January 2, 2012	John Tortorella	New York Rangers (head coach)	Comments criticizing NHL officiating.	January 4, 2012	$30,000 U.S.
January 19, 2012	Nik Antropov	Winnipeg Jets	Boarding T. J. Brennan.	January 20, 2012	$2,500 U.S.
January 20, 2012	P. K. Subban	Montreal Canadiens	Tripping Chris Kunitz.	January 21, 2012	$2,500 U.S.
January 31, 2012	Eric Boulton	New Jersey Devils	Slashing Michael Rupp.	February 1, 2012	$2,500 U.S.
January 31, 2012	Jared Boll	Columbus Blue Jackets	Illegal hit to the head of Joe Thornton.	February 1, 2012	$2,500 U.S.
February 2, 2012	Patrik Elias	New Jersey Devils	Boarding Mike Blunden.	February 3, 2012	$2,500 U.S.
February 4, 2012	Zac Rinaldo	Philadelphia Flyers	Late hit on Jacob Josefson.	February 4, 2012	$2,500 U.S.
February 4, 2012	Zac Rinaldo	Philadelphia Flyers	Tripping Zach Parise.	February 4, 2012	$2,500 U.S.
February 4, 2012	Chuck Kobasew	Colorado Avalanche	Tripping Dan Hamhuis.	February 6, 2012	$2,500 U.S.
February 9, 2012	Dominic Moore	Tampa Bay Lightning	Interference with Ruslan Fedotenko.	February 10, 2012	$2,500 U.S.
February 18, 2012	Jordan Staal	Pittsburgh Penguins	Boarding Braydon Coburn.	February 18, 2012	$2,500 U.S.
March 4, 2012	Erik Karlsson	Ottawa Senators	Slashing Sean Bergenheim.	March 6, 2012	$2,500 U.S.
March 8, 2012	Erik Cole	Montreal Canadiens	Slew-footing Jeff Petry.	March 9, 2012	$2,500 U.S.
March 15, 2012	Shane Doan	Phoenix Coyotes	Boarding Mark Giordano.	March 16, 2012	$2,500 U.S.
March 16, 2012	Mark Stuart	Winnipeg Jets	Late hit on Marcus Johansson.	March 17, 2012	$2,500 U.S.
March 24, 2012	Chuck Kobasew	Colorado Avalanche	Charging Aaron Rome.	March 25, 2012	$2,500 U.S.
March 24, 2012	Alexandre Bolduc	Phoenix Coyotes	Slew-footing Ryane Clowe.	March 25, 2012	$2,500 U.S.
April 1, 2012	Peter Laviolette	Philadelphia Flyers (head coach)	Climbing half-boards to engage in verbal altercation.	April 2, 2012	$10,000 U.S.
April 1, 2012	Tony Granato	Pittsburgh Penguins (assistant coach)	Climbing half-boards to engage in verbal altercation.	April 2, 2012	$2,500 U.S.
April 2, 2012	Tom Renney	Edmonton Oilers (head coach)	Comments following April 2 game vs. Kings.	April 3, 2012	$10,000 U.S.
April 5, 2012	John Tortorella	New York Rangers (head coach)	Comments following April 5 game vs. Penguins.	April 6, 2012	$20,000 U.S.
April 11, 2012	Shea Weber	Nashville Predators	Illegal hit to the head of Henrik Zetterberg.	April 11, 2011	$2,500 U.S.
April 14, 2012	Zenon Konopka	Ottawa Senators	Comments preceding April 14 game vs. Rangers.	April 16, 2012	$2,500 U.S.
April 14, 2012	Team	Ottawa Senators	Fined in the wake of Zenon Konopka's comments preceding April 14 game vs. Rangers.	April 16, 2012	$10,000 U.S.
April 15, 2012	Dan Bylsma	Pittsburgh Penguins (head coach)	Automatic fine because player received instigator penalty during the last five minutes of a game.	April 16, 2012	$10,000 U.S.
April 17, 2012	Joel Quenneville	Chicago Blackhawks (head coach)	Comments criticizing NHL officiating.	April 19, 2012	$10,000 U.S.

== See also ==
- 2011–12 NHL transactions
- 2011 NHL entry draft
- 2012 in sports
- 2011 in sports
- List of 2011–12 NHL Three Star Awards
- 2010–11 NHL suspensions and fines
