= 2012 Stanley Cup playoffs =

Tournament details
- Dates: April 11–June 11, 2012
- Teams: 16
- Defending champions: Boston Bruins

Final positions
- Champions: Los Angeles Kings
- Runners-up: New Jersey Devils

Tournament statistics
- Scoring leader(s): Dustin Brown (Kings); Anze Kopitar (Kings) (20 points)

Awards
- MVP: Jonathan Quick (Kings)

The 2012 Stanley Cup playoffs was the playoff tournament of the National Hockey League (NHL) for the 2011–12 season. It began on April 11, 2012, after the conclusion of the regular season, and ended on June 11, with the Los Angeles Kings defeating the New Jersey Devils in six games in the Stanley Cup Final to win their first Stanley Cup championship. Kings goaltender Jonathan Quick, having recorded a 1.41 goals against average, was named the Conn Smythe Trophy winner as the playoffs' most valuable player.

The Vancouver Canucks made the playoffs as the Presidents' Trophy winners for the second consecutive year with the most points (i.e. best record) during the regular season. The Detroit Red Wings increased their postseason appearance streak to twenty-one seasons, the longest active streak at the time. The Florida Panthers returned to the postseason to end a record-breaking 10-season drought from the playoffs that began with the 2000 Stanley Cup playoffs. This was also the first time that the Buffalo Sabres missed the playoffs during their active playoff appearance drought; they surpassed Edmonton and Florida's shared record for longest playoff appearance drought in league history by missing the playoffs in 2022. The Sabres' record playoff drought would reach 14 seasons before ending in 2026. This was the first year since 1996 and only the second time since 1974 in which no Canadian-based teams advanced past the first round. It marked the first time since 2004 in which none of the previous year's conference finalists (Boston Bruins, Vancouver Canucks, Tampa Bay Lightning, and San Jose Sharks) advanced past the opening round. This was the only playoffs where the Phoenix Coyotes advanced beyond the round of 16 teams.

After clinching a postseason spot in their 81st game of the regular season, the Kings became the first eighth-seeded team to win the Stanley Cup in NHL history (and the second eighth seed to reach the Cup Final after the 2005–06 Edmonton Oilers). They also became the first team in NHL history to have a 3-0 lead in all four playoff rounds. Their postseason began with an elimination of the Vancouver Canucks, who became the third Presidents' Trophy-winning team in the last four seasons to be eliminated in the opening round. Los Angeles went on to become the second team to eliminate the first, second, and third seeds from the playoffs in the same postseason after the 2003–04 Calgary Flames (and the first team to do so in that order). In addition, the Kings became the first team to make the Finals undefeated on the road (with their 8–0 record). As the sixth seed in their conference, the Devils were the lowest-seeded team to have home-ice advantage in the Stanley Cup Final, breaking a record they set when they won the Cup as a fourth seed in 2000.

== Playoff seeds ==
The top eight teams in each conference qualified for the playoffs. The top three seeds in each conference were awarded to the division winners; while the five remaining spots were awarded to the highest finishers in their respective conferences.

The following teams qualified for the playoffs:

=== Eastern Conference ===
1. New York Rangers, Atlantic Division champions, Eastern Conference regular season champions – 109 points
2. Boston Bruins, Northeast Division champions – 102 points
3. Florida Panthers, Southeast Division champions – 94 points
4. Pittsburgh Penguins – 108 points
5. Philadelphia Flyers – 103 points
6. New Jersey Devils – 102 points
7. Washington Capitals – 92 points (38 ROWs)
8. Ottawa Senators – 92 points (35 ROWs)

=== Western Conference ===
1. Vancouver Canucks, Northwest Division champions, Western Conference regular season champions, Presidents' Trophy winners – 111 points
2. St. Louis Blues, Central Division champions – 109 points
3. Phoenix Coyotes, Pacific Division champions – 97 points
4. Nashville Predators – 104 points
5. Detroit Red Wings – 102 points
6. Chicago Blackhawks – 101 points
7. San Jose Sharks – 96 points
8. Los Angeles Kings – 95 points

== Playoff bracket ==
In each round, teams competed in a best-of-seven series following a 2–2–1–1–1 format (scores in the bracket indicate the number of games won in each best-of-seven series). The team with home ice advantage played at home for games one and two (and games five and seven, if necessary), and the other team played at home for games three and four (and game six, if necessary). The top eight teams in each conference made the playoffs, with the three division winners seeded 1–3 based on regular season record, and the five remaining teams seeded 4–8.

The NHL used "re-seeding" instead of a fixed bracket playoff system. During the first three rounds, the highest remaining seed in each conference was matched against the lowest remaining seed, the second-highest remaining seed played the second-lowest remaining seed, and so forth. The higher-seeded team was awarded home ice advantage. The two conference winners then advanced to the Stanley Cup Final, where home ice advantage was awarded to the team that had the better regular season record.

Conference quarterfinals	Conference semifinals
1	NY Rangers	4
8	Ottawa	3
1	NY Rangers	4
7	Washington	3
2	Boston	3
7	Washington	4
Eastern Conference
3	Florida	3
6	New Jersey	4
5	Philadelphia	1
6	New Jersey	4
4	Pittsburgh	2
5	Philadelphia	4
1	Vancouver	1
8	Los Angeles	4
2	St. Louis	0
8	Los Angeles	4
2	St. Louis	4
7	San Jose	1
Western Conference
3	Phoenix	4
6	Chicago	2
3	Phoenix	4
4	Nashville	1
4	Nashville	4
5	Detroit	1

Conference finals
1	NY Rangers	2
6	New Jersey	4
8	Los Angeles	4
3	Phoenix	1

Stanley Cup Final
E6	New Jersey	2
W8	Los Angeles	4

== Conference quarterfinals ==
The conference quarterfinals featured an NHL-record 16 overtime games.

One of the other major headlines during the conference quarterfinals were the number of suspensions and fines handed by the league. However, several players, coaches and writers complained about the lack of consistency that Brendan Shanahan, the NHL's Vice President of Player Safety and Hockey Operations, was handing out these fines and suspensions. (for each specific fine or suspension, see each series summary below)

=== Eastern Conference quarterfinals ===
==== (1) New York Rangers vs. (8) Ottawa Senators ====
The New York Rangers entered the playoffs as the first overall seed in the Eastern Conference with 109 points. The Ottawa Senators earned 92 points during the regular season, losing the tiebreaker to Washington in regulation + overtime wins (38 to 35) to finish eighth overall in the Eastern Conference. This was the first playoff series between these two teams. Ottawa won three of the games in the season's four-game regular season series.

The first few games of the series were overshadowed by rough play and suspensions on both sides. In the first game, Rangers' checking center Brian Boyle punched defenceman Erik Karlsson but was not penalized. Senators' head coach Paul MacLean responded by adding enforcers Zenon Konopka and Matt Carkner for game two. Konopka harried Boyle as he conducted a live TV interview during the pre-game warm-ups, earning himself and his club fines. Carkner attacked Boyle at the beginning of the game and continued punching after Boyle fell to the ice. Boyle never dropped his gloves and Carkner was given a five-minute major and game misconduct. The Rangers' Brandon Dubinsky was also ejected as the third man in on the altercation; he threw a Gatorade cooler as he exited. Carkner received a one-game suspension for fighting an unwilling player. In an unrelated incident in that same game, New York's rookie skater Carl Hagelin elbowed Ottawa's captain Daniel Alfredsson in the head. Hagelin was given a five-minute major penalty and Alfredsson left the game and did not return. Hagelin was suspended for three games prompting a question of consistency by the New York Rangers. Alfredsson missed three games due to a concussion from the incident.

New York had a 4–2 victory in game one, but Ottawa's Chris Neil scored 1:17 into overtime of game two to tie the series at 1–1. In game three, Boyle scored the lone goal in the Rangers' 1–0 win. The Senators then overcame a two-goal deficit in game four to even the series yet again with Kyle Turris' goal 2:42 into overtime. Ottawa goaltender Craig Anderson stopped all 41 shots in a 2–0 victory on the road in game five, giving the Senators their first lead in the series. New York scored three goals in the second period in their 3–2 victory in game six and then held on to a 2–1 win in game seven to take the series.

April 12	Ottawa Senators	2–4	New York Rangers	Madison Square Garden	Recap
No scoring		First period	12:01 – Ryan Callahan (1)
No scoring		Second period	16:24 – Marian Gaborik (1); 19:06 – Brian Boyle (1)
Daniel Alfredsson (1) – 10:05; Erik Condra (1) – 17:41		Third period	02:15 – Brad Richards (1)
Craig Anderson 27 saves / 31 shots		Goalie stats	Henrik Lundqvist 30 saves / 32 shots

April 14	Ottawa Senators	3–2	OT	New York Rangers	Madison Square Garden	Recap
No scoring		First period		10:11 – pp – Anton Stralman (1)
Erik Karlsson (1) – pp – 13:50		Second period		No scoring
Nick Foligno (1) – 15:23		Third period		02:41 – Brian Boyle (2)
Chris Neil (1) – 01:17		First overtime period		No scoring
Craig Anderson 27 saves / 29 shots		Goalie stats		Henrik Lundqvist 29 saves / 32 shots

April 16	New York Rangers	1–0	Ottawa Senators	Scotiabank Place	Recap
No scoring		First period	No scoring
No scoring		Second period	No scoring
Brian Boyle (3) – 07:35		Third period	No scoring
Henrik Lundqvist 39 saves / 39 shots		Goalie stats	Craig Anderson 22 saves / 23 shots

April 18	New York Rangers	2–3	OT	Ottawa Senators	Scotiabank Place	Recap
Anton Stralman (2) – pp – 00:49; Ryan Callahan (2) – pp – 06:10		First period		No scoring
No scoring		Second period		07:04 – Milan Michalek (1); 17:50 – pp – Sergei Gonchar (1)
No scoring		Third period		No scoring
No scoring		First overtime period		02:42 – Kyle Turris (1)
Henrik Lundqvist 28 saves / 31 shots		Goalie stats		Craig Anderson 31 saves / 33 shots

April 21	Ottawa Senators	2–0	New York Rangers	Madison Square Garden	Recap
Jason Spezza (1) – 09:18		First period	No scoring
No scoring		Second period	No scoring
Jason Spezza (2) – en – 19:04		Third period	No scoring
Craig Anderson 41 saves / 41 shots		Goalie stats	Henrik Lundqvist 28 saves / 29 shots

April 23	New York Rangers	3–2	Ottawa Senators	Scotiabank Place	Recap
No scoring		First period	07:05 – pp – Chris Neil (2)
Derek Stepan (1) – pp – 08:55; Brad Richards (2) – pp – 17:08; Chris Kreider (1) – 19:19		Second period	No scoring
No scoring		Third period	19:21 – Jason Spezza (3)
Henrik Lundqvist 25 saves / 27 shots		Goalie stats	Craig Anderson 19 saves / 22 shots

April 26	Ottawa Senators	1–2	New York Rangers	Madison Square Garden	Recap
No scoring		First period	No scoring
Daniel Alfredsson (2) – pp – 11:34		Second period	04:46 – Marc Staal (1); 09:04 – Daniel Girardi (1)
No scoring		Third period	No scoring
Craig Anderson 27 saves / 29 shots		Goalie stats	Henrik Lundqvist 26 saves / 27 shots

New York won series 4–3

==== (2) Boston Bruins vs. (7) Washington Capitals ====
The Boston Bruins, the defending 2011 Stanley Cup champions, entered the playoffs as the second seed in the Eastern Conference by winning the Northeast Division with 102 points. The Washington Capitals earned 92 points during the regular season, winning the tiebreaker over Ottawa in regulation + overtime wins (38 to 35) to finish seventh overall in the Eastern Conference. This was the third playoff series between these two teams, with each team having won one of the previous playoff series. The most recent series between these teams was the 1998 Eastern Conference quarterfinals, which was won by Washington in six games. Washington won three of the games in this year's four-game regular season series.

This was the first ever playoff series in NHL history in which all seven games were decided by only one goal. In addition, four of these games were decided in overtime. Rookie Capitals goaltender Braden Holtby, who started in place of injured regulars Tomas Vokoun and Michal Neuvirth, allowed only two goals in the first two games, matching his Bruins counterpart Tim Thomas. Thomas recorded a shutout in Boston's 1–0 overtime victory in game one. In game two, the Capitals battled back with a double overtime thriller when forward Nicklas Backstrom scored early in the second overtime period. The Bruins' 4–3 win in game three was followed by Backstrom getting suspended for one game after his post-game cross-check on Bruins forward Rich Peverley. Even without Backstrom, the Capitals evened the series with a 2–1 victory in game four. Washington's Troy Brouwer then scored the winning goal on a power play with 1:27 left in regulation of game five. Boston, facing elimination, went to Washington and managed to extend the series with Tyler Seguin's goal in overtime of game six. Game seven started with Washington forward Matt Hendricks deflecting the puck past Thomas. The Bruins answered with a shot that snuck behind Holtby and Tyler Seguin finding the puck and putting it in, but Washington's Joel Ward scored in overtime to give Washington a 2–1 victory in game seven and eliminate the defending Stanley Cup champion Bruins. With Washington's victory in the series, Holtby became just the third rookie goaltender in NHL history to defeat the reigning Stanley Cup champions.

April 12	Washington Capitals	0–1	OT	Boston Bruins	TD Garden	Recap
No scoring		First period		No scoring
No scoring		Second period		No scoring
No scoring		Third period		No scoring
No scoring		First overtime period		01:18 – Chris Kelly (1)
Braden Holtby 29 saves / 30 shots		Goalie stats		Tim Thomas 17 saves / 17 shots

April 14	Washington Capitals	2–1	2OT	Boston Bruins	TD Garden	Recap
No scoring		First period		No scoring
Troy Brouwer (1) – 17:57		Second period		No scoring
No scoring		Third period		12:13 – Benoit Pouliot (1)
Nicklas Backstrom (1) – 02:56		Second overtime period		No scoring
Braden Holtby 43 saves / 44 shots		Goalie stats		Tim Thomas 37 saves / 39 shots

April 16	Boston Bruins	4–3	Washington Capitals	Verizon Center	Recap
No scoring		First period	16:00 – pp – Alexander Semin (1)
Rich Peverley (1) – 00:35; Daniel Paille (1) – 09:38		Second period	00:48 – Alexander Ovechkin (1)
Brian Rolston (1) – 01:02; Zdeno Chara (1) – 18:07		Third period	14:00 – Brooks Laich (1)
Tim Thomas 29 saves / 32 shots		Goalie stats	Braden Holtby 25 saves / 29 shots

April 19	Boston Bruins	1–2	Washington Capitals	Verizon Center	Recap
Rich Peverley (2) – 13:12		First period	01:22 – Marcus Johansson (1)
No scoring		Second period	18:43 – pp – Alexander Semin (2)
No scoring		Third period	No scoring
Tim Thomas 19 saves / 21 shots		Goalie stats	Braden Holtby 44 saves / 45 shots

April 21	Washington Capitals	4–3	Boston Bruins	TD Garden	Recap
No scoring		First period	No scoring
Alexander Semin (3) – 11:16; Jay Beagle (1) – 14:27		Second period	17:21 – Dennis Seidenberg (1); 17:49 – Brad Marchand (1)
Mike Knuble (1) – 03:21; Troy Brouwer (2) – pp – 18:33		Third period	08:47 – pp – Johnny Boychuk (1)
Braden Holtby 34 saves / 37 shots		Goalie stats	Tim Thomas 28 saves / 32 shots

April 22	Boston Bruins	4–3	OT	Washington Capitals	Verizon Center	Recap
Rich Peverley (3) – 05:56; David Krejci (1) – pp – 16:48		First period		09:47 – Mike Green (1)
No scoring		Second period		19:18 – Jason Chimera (1)
Andrew Ference (1) – 11:57		Third period		15:08 – Alexander Ovechkin (2)
Tyler Seguin (1) – 03:17		First overtime period		No scoring
Tim Thomas 36 saves / 39 shots		Goalie stats		Braden Holtby 27 saves / 31 shots

April 25	Washington Capitals	2–1	OT	Boston Bruins	TD Garden	Recap
Matt Hendricks (1) – 11:23		First period		No scoring
No scoring		Second period		14:27 – Tyler Seguin (2)
No scoring		Third period		No scoring
Joel Ward (1) – 02:57		First overtime period		No scoring
Braden Holtby 31 saves / 32 shots		Goalie stats		Tim Thomas 25 saves / 27 shots

Washington won series 4–3

==== (3) Florida Panthers vs. (6) New Jersey Devils ====
The Florida Panthers entered the playoffs as the third seed in the Eastern Conference by winning the Southeast Division with 94 points. The New Jersey Devils earned 102 points during the regular season to finish sixth overall in the Eastern Conference. This was the second playoff series between these two teams, with New Jersey having swept the 2000 Eastern Conference quarterfinals, the last time the Panthers qualified for the playoffs. The teams split this year's four-game regular season series.

In the first two games of the series, the winner scored the first three goals. In game one, Devils goaltender Martin Brodeur won his 100th career playoff game, only the second netminder after Patrick Roy to do so, as New Jersey won 3–2. The Panthers' 4–2 win in game two was their first playoff win since April 17, 1997, and ended a streak of nine straight defeats in a 15-year span. game three saw both starting goaltenders pulled from the game. Florida's Jose Theodore surrendered three goals in the first period before being replaced by Scott Clemmensen, appearing in only his second playoff game. Brodeur was then pulled after the Panthers rallied to tie the game in the second period en route to 4–3 win. This was the first time since game one of the 2006 Eastern Conference semifinals against the Carolina Hurricanes that Brodeur was pulled in a postseason game, which coincidentally marked Clemmensen's playoff debut. Brodeur bounced back in game four and broke another one of Roy's records with his 24th career playoff shutout, as the Devils beat the Panthers, 4–0. But Theodore responded with his second career postseason shutout, as the Panthers took a 3–2 series lead with a 3–0 victory in game five. The Devils then tied the series with Travis Zajac's winning goal 5:39 into the overtime of game six. New Jersey's Adam Henrique then scored two goals in game seven, including the series-winning goal 3:47 into double overtime, to defeat Florida, 3–2.

April 13	New Jersey Devils	3–2	Florida Panthers	BankAtlantic Center	Recap
Patrik Elias (1) – 06:31; Dainius Zubrus (1) – pp – 14:11; Ryan Carter (1) – 14:56		First period	No scoring
No scoring		Second period	07:44 – Sean Bergenheim (1); 15:42 – pp – Kris Versteeg (1)
No scoring		Third period	No scoring
Martin Brodeur 24 saves / 26 shots		Goalie stats	Jose Theodore 35 saves / 38 shots

April 15	New Jersey Devils	2–4	Florida Panthers	BankAtlantic Center	Recap
No scoring		First period	00:23 – pp – Stephen Weiss (1)
No scoring		Second period	01:12 – pp – Stephen Weiss (2); 14:39 – Marcel Goc (1)
Travis Zajac (1) – 00:48; Ilya Kovalchuk (1) – 02:02		Third period	19:59 – en – Tomas Fleischmann (1)
Martin Brodeur 20 saves / 23 shots		Goalie stats	Jose Theodore 23 saves / 25 shots

April 17	Florida Panthers	4–3	New Jersey Devils	Prudential Center	Recap
Sean Bergenheim (2) – pp – 16:11; Jason Garrison (1) – pp – 19:52		First period	00:33 – Zach Parise (1); 03:27 – Stephen Gionta (1); 06:16 – pp – Patrik Elias (2)
Mike Weaver (1) – 02:18; Brian Campbell (1) – pp – 06:34		Second period	No scoring
No scoring		Third period	No scoring
Jose Theodore 3 saves / 6 shots Scott Clemmensen 19 saves / 19 shots		Goalie stats	Martin Brodeur 9 saves / 12 shots Johan Hedberg 13 saves / 14 shots

April 19	Florida Panthers	0–4	New Jersey Devils	Prudential Center	Recap
No scoring		First period	No scoring
No scoring		Second period	06:08 – pp – Zach Parise (2)
No scoring		Third period	02:02 – Steve Bernier (1); 03:35 – Travis Zajac (2); 08:32 – pp – Ilya Kovalchuk (2)
Scott Clemmensen 23 saves / 27 shots		Goalie stats	Martin Brodeur 26 saves / 26 shots

April 21	New Jersey Devils	0–3	Florida Panthers	BankAtlantic Center	Recap
No scoring		First period	No scoring
No scoring		Second period	04:00 – pp – Kris Versteeg (2)
No scoring		Third period	13:17 – Scottie Upshall (1); 19:26 – en – Tomas Kopecky (1)
Martin Brodeur 30 saves / 32 shots		Goalie stats	Jose Theodore 30 saves / 30 shots

April 24	Florida Panthers	2–3	OT	New Jersey Devils	Prudential Center	Recap
No scoring		First period		16:37 – Steve Bernier (2)
Kris Versteeg (3) – 07:05; Sean Bergenheim (3) – 12:49		Second period		04:21 – pp – Ilya Kovalchuk (3)
No scoring		Third period		No scoring
No scoring		First overtime period		05:39 – Travis Zajac (3)
Scott Clemmensen 39 saves / 42 shots		Goalie stats		Martin Brodeur 14 saves / 16 shots

April 26	New Jersey Devils	3–2	2OT	Florida Panthers	BankAtlantic Center	Recap
Adam Henrique (1) – 01:29		First period		No scoring
Stephen Gionta (2) – 09:15		Second period		No scoring
No scoring		Third period		05:02 – pp – Stephen Weiss (3); 16:32 – pp – Marcel Goc (2)
Adam Henrique (2) – 03:47		Second overtime period		No scoring
Martin Brodeur 43 saves / 45 shots		Goalie stats		Jose Theodore 33 saves / 36 shots

New Jersey won series 4–3

==== (4) Pittsburgh Penguins vs. (5) Philadelphia Flyers ====
The Pittsburgh Penguins entered the playoffs as the fourth overall seed in the Eastern Conference with 108 points. The Philadelphia Flyers earned 103 points during the regular season to finish fifth overall in the Eastern Conference. This was the sixth playoff series between these two teams, with Philadelphia having won three of the five previous playoff series. In the most recent matchup in the 2009 Eastern Conference quarterfinals, the Penguins defeated the Flyers in six games. Philadelphia won four of the games in this year's six-game regular season series. The Penguins entered the series as the favorites, with many hockey commentators predicting them to be the Stanley Cup champions.

However, the Flyers won the first three games of the series en route to eliminating the Penguins in six games. Pittsburgh struggled defensively, giving up eight goals in each of games two and three. The Penguins did however score 10 goals in their game four win, becoming the first team to do so in a playoff game since the Los Angeles Kings scored 12 in the 1990 Smythe Division semifinals against the Calgary Flames. The Flyers' goaltending flaws resurfaced in that game, with neither Ilya Bryzgalov nor Sergei Bobrovsky able to stop the Penguins' torrid shooting. Again facing elimination, Pittsburgh went on to win game five, 3–2, in the lowest scoring game of the series. But Philadelphia rebounded to eliminate Pittsburgh in game six by the score of 5–1.

Game three was overshadowed by a flurry of penalties drawn between the two teams, reminiscent of their penultimate regular season meeting on April 1. Three Penguins players drew suspensions. Arron Asham was suspended four games for a cross-check on Brayden Schenn, Craig Adams was suspended one game for instigating a fight, and James Neal was suspended one game for charging Claude Giroux. Penguins head coach Dan Bylsma was fined $10,000 because of Adams' instigator penalty in the final five minutes of the game.

The 45 goals scored through the first four games set an NHL record for goals in the first four games of a best-of-seven series. A total of 56 goals were scored over the course of the entire series, the highest total in any playoff series since 1995.

April 11	Philadelphia Flyers	4–3	OT	Pittsburgh Penguins	Consol Energy Center	Recap
No scoring		First period		03:43 – Sidney Crosby (1); 07:49 – Tyler Kennedy (1); 19:23 – Pascal Dupuis (1)
Daniel Briere (1) – 06:22		Second period		No scoring
Daniel Briere (2) – 09:17; Brayden Schenn (1) – pp – 12:23		Third period		No scoring
Jakub Voracek (1) – 02:23		First overtime period		No scoring
Ilya Bryzgalov 25 saves / 28 shots		Goalie stats		Marc–Andre Fleury 22 saves / 26 shots

April 13	Philadelphia Flyers	8–5	Pittsburgh Penguins	Consol Energy Center	Recap
Maxime Talbot (1) – sh – 12:44		First period	00:15 – Sidney Crosby (2); 09:27 – pp – Chris Kunitz (1); 19:42 – Paul Martin (1)
Claude Giroux (1) – pp – 05:11; Claude Giroux (2) – sh – 11:04; Sean Couturier (1) – 19:57		Second period	11:10 – pp – Chris Kunitz (2)
Sean Couturier (2) – 01:21; Jaromir Jagr (1) – 09:13; Sean Couturier (3) – 18:11; Claude Giroux (3) – en – 19:53		Third period	01:04 – Tyler Kennedy (2)
Ilya Bryzgalov 23 saves / 28 shots		Goalie stats	Marc–Andre Fleury 23 saves / 30 shots

April 15	Pittsburgh Penguins	4–8	Philadelphia Flyers	Wells Fargo Center	Recap
Jordan Staal (1) – 03:52; James Neal (1) – 15:17		First period	06:44 – sh – Maxime Talbot (2); 08:19 – pp – Daniel Briere (3); 11:45 – Daniel Briere (4); 15:40 – Matt Read (1)
James Neal (2) – pp – 10:31; Jordan Staal (2) – 15:40		Second period	14:18 – pp – Matt Read (2); 19:14 – pp – Wayne Simmonds (1)
No scoring		Third period	00:27 – Claude Giroux (4); 17:14 – pp – Maxime Talbot (3)
Marc–Andre Fleury 22 saves / 28 shots Brent Johnson 4 saves / 6 shots		Goalie stats	Ilya Bryzgalov 31 saves / 35 shots

April 18	Pittsburgh Penguins	10–3	Philadelphia Flyers	Wells Fargo Center	Recap
Evgeni Malkin (1) – 03:37; Matt Niskanen (1) – pp – 08:05; Sidney Crosby (3) – 16:19; Jordan Staal (3) – 17:29		First period	01:16 – pp – Claude Giroux (5); 15:06 – pp – Kimmo Timonen (1); 15:52 – pp – Jakub Voracek (2)
Kris Letang (1) – pp – 03:07; Jordan Staal (4) – pp – 07:21; Steve Sullivan (1) – pp – 10:55; Pascal Dupuis (2) – 14:59; Jordan Staal (5) – 16:03		Second period	No scoring
Evgeni Malkin (2) – 04:04		Third period	No scoring
Marc–Andre Fleury 22 saves / 25 shots		Goalie stats	Ilya Bryzgalov 13 saves / 18 shots Sergei Bobrovsky 13 saves / 18 shots

April 20	Philadelphia Flyers	2–3	Pittsburgh Penguins	Consol Energy Center	Recap
Matt Carle (1) – pp – 11:45; Scott Hartnell (1) – pp – 17:35		First period	14:51 – pp – Steve Sullivan (2)
No scoring		Second period	06:15 – Jordan Staal (6); 09:53 – Tyler Kennedy (3)
No scoring		Third period	No scoring
Ilya Bryzgalov 20 saves / 23 shots		Goalie stats	Marc–Andre Fleury 24 saves / 26 shots

April 22	Pittsburgh Penguins	1–5	Philadelphia Flyers	Wells Fargo Center	Recap
No scoring		First period	00:32 – Claude Giroux (6); 13:01 – pp – Scott Hartnell (2)
Evgeni Malkin (3) – pp – 08:34		Second period	05:25 – Erik Gustafsson (1); 09:10 – Daniel Briere (5)
No scoring		Third period	19:52 – en – Brayden Schenn (2)
Marc–Andre Fleury 18 saves / 22 shots		Goalie stats	Ilya Bryzgalov 30 saves / 31 shots

Philadelphia won series 4–2

=== Western Conference quarterfinals ===
==== (1) Vancouver Canucks vs. (8) Los Angeles Kings ====
The Vancouver Canucks entered the playoffs as the Western Conference regular season champions and the back-to-back Presidents' Trophy winners, earning 111 points. The Los Angeles Kings qualified for the postseason as the eighth seed with 95 points. This was the fifth playoff series between these two teams, the two teams each having won two of the previous playoff series. The most recent matchup occurred in the 2010 Western Conference quarterfinals, where the Canucks defeated the Kings in six games. The teams split this year's four-game regular season series. The Canucks entered the series as the favorites, with many hockey commentators predicting them to win this series and to be the Western Conference champions due to the fact they had fallen one win short from the Stanley Cup the year prior having gone all the way to the Finals and losing in seven to the Boston Bruins along with coming off two consecutive Presidents' Trophies and having most of the players from the previous year still intact on their roster.

However, the Kings won the first three games of the series en route to eliminating the Canucks in five games. In doing so, Los Angeles became the third California team, and the sixth team overall, to eliminate a Presidents' Trophy winner in the first round of the playoffs, and the first to go on to win the Stanley Cup. Vancouver struggled offensively throughout the series, while Los Angeles goaltender Jonathan Quick only allowed eight total goals, including a shutout in game three. The Canucks' Byron Bitz was suspended for two games after boarding the Kings' Kyle Clifford in game one. Cory Schneider then replaced Roberto Luongo as Vancouver's starting goaltender for game three, prompting speculation that Luongo might be traded after the season. Game four saw the return of Vancouver winger Daniel Sedin, in his first appearance since suffering a concussion on March 21. He had an assist on a goal by Canucks' captain and twin brother Henrik in the Canucks' 3–1 victory in game four, and the team avoided becoming the first Presidents' Trophy winner to be swept in a conference quarterfinal series. However, Jarret Stoll ended the Canucks season, scoring at 4:27 of overtime to give the Kings a 2–1 victory in game five, the only overtime game of the series to prevent the Canucks from forcing a sixth game. They moved on to the second round for the first time since 2001.

April 11	Los Angeles Kings	4–2	Vancouver Canucks	Rogers Arena	Recap
Mike Richards (1) – pp – 13:31		First period	04:17 – Alexandre Burrows (1)
Willie Mitchell (1) – pp – 16:33		Second period	19:52 – Alexander Edler (1)
Dustin Penner (1) – 16:46; Dustin Brown (1) – en –19:42		Third period	No scoring
Jonathan Quick 24 saves / 26 shots		Goalie stats	Roberto Luongo 35 saves / 38 shots

April 13	Los Angeles Kings	4–2	Vancouver Canucks	Rogers Arena	Recap
Dustin Brown (2) – sh – 19:51		First period	No scoring
Dustin Brown (3) – sh – 05:17		Second period	00:17 – Jannik Hansen (1)
Jarret Stoll (1) – pp – 08:30; Trevor Lewis (1) – 14:51		Third period	16:22 – Samuel Pahlsson (1)
Jonathan Quick 46 saves / 48 shots		Goalie stats	Roberto Luongo 22 saves / 26 shots

April 15	Vancouver Canucks	0–1	Los Angeles Kings	Staples Center	Recap
No scoring		First period	No scoring
No scoring		Second period	No scoring
No scoring		Third period	06:30 – Dustin Brown (4)
Cory Schneider 19 saves / 20 shots		Goalie stats	Jonathan Quick 41 saves / 41 shots

April 18	Vancouver Canucks	3–1	Los Angeles Kings	Staples Center	Recap
No scoring		First period	13:00 – Anze Kopitar (1)
Alexander Edler (2) – pp – 04:07; Kevin Bieksa (1) – 08:36		Second period	No scoring
Henrik Sedin (1) – pp – 05:45		Third period	No scoring
Cory Schneider 43 saves / 44 shots		Goalie stats	Jonathan Quick 27 saves / 30 shots

April 22	Los Angeles Kings	2–1	OT	Vancouver Canucks	Rogers Arena	Recap
No scoring		First period		14:04 – pp – Henrik Sedin (2)
No scoring		Second period		No scoring
Brad Richardson (1) – 03:21		Third period		No scoring
Jarret Stoll (2) – 04:27		First overtime period		No scoring
Jonathan Quick 26 saves / 27 shots		Goalie stats		Cory Schneider 35 saves / 37 shots

Los Angeles won series 4–1

==== (2) St. Louis Blues vs. (7) San Jose Sharks ====
The St. Louis Blues entered the playoffs as the Central Division champions, earning 109 points. The San Jose Sharks qualified for the postseason as the seventh seed with 96 points. This was the fourth playoff series between these two teams, with San Jose having won two of the three previous playoff series. The most recent matchup occurred in the 2004 Western Conference quarterfinals, where the Sharks defeated the Blues in five games. St. Louis swept this year's four-game regular season series, outscoring San Jose by a combined score of 11–3. A large part of the Blues' success was the play of their goaltenders Jaroslav Halak and Brian Elliott, who both allowed a league low of 165 combined team goals, earning them the William M. Jennings Trophy.

The Blues began the playoffs with Halak on goal, partly based on his playoff experience playing for the Montreal Canadiens. The Sharks took game one off of Martin Havlat's goal in double overtime. Halak then suffered a lower-body injury early into game two, but Elliott picked up where Halak left off in a Blues' 3–0 shutout, and subsequently allowed only five San Jose goals in St. Louis' victories in games three, four, and five to capture the series.

April 12	San Jose Sharks	3–2	2OT	St. Louis Blues	Scottrade Center	Recap
No scoring		First period		No scoring
Martin Havlat (1) – pp – 06:02		Second period		No scoring
Andrew Desjardins (1) – 14:44		Third period		00:54 – Patrik Berglund (1); 07:28 – pp – Patrik Berglund (2)
Martin Havlat (2) – 03:34		Second overtime period		No scoring
Antti Niemi 40 saves / 42 shots		Goalie stats		Jaroslav Halak 31 saves / 34 shots

April 14	San Jose Sharks	0–3	St. Louis Blues	Scottrade Center	Recap
No scoring		First period	01:31 – Vladimir Sobotka (1)
No scoring		Second period	13:49 – David Backes (1)
No scoring		Third period	19:35 – pp – Andy McDonald (1)
Antti Niemi 29 saves / 32 shots		Goalie stats	Jaroslav Halak 12 saves / 12 shots Brian Elliott 17 saves / 17 shots

April 16	St. Louis Blues	4–3	San Jose Sharks	HP Pavilion	Recap
Patrik Berglund (3) – pp – 14:31		First period	16:45 – pp – Brent Burns (1)
Andy McDonald (2) – 01:01; Jason Arnott (1) – pp – 10:06		Second period	No scoring
Alexander Steen (1) – pp – 00:59		Third period	16:58 – Colin White (1); 19:43 – Logan Couture (1)
Brian Elliott 26 saves / 29 shots		Goalie stats	Antti Niemi 23 saves / 27 shots

April 19	St. Louis Blues	2–1	San Jose Sharks	HP Pavilion	Recap
B. J. Crombeen (1) – 07:12		First period	No scoring
No scoring		Second period	No scoring
Andy McDonald (3) – pp – 12:00		Third period	18:53 – Joe Thornton (1)
Brian Elliott 24 saves / 25 shots		Goalie stats	Antti Niemi 22 saves / 24 shots

April 21	San Jose Sharks	1–3	St. Louis Blues	Scottrade Center	Recap
No scoring		First period	No scoring
Joe Thornton (2) – 19:19		Second period	No scoring
No scoring		Third period	11:16 – Jamie Langenbrunner (1); 12:01 – David Perron (1); 19:21 – en – Andy McDonald (4)
Antti Niemi 24 saves / 26 shots		Goalie stats	Brian Elliott 26 saves / 27 shots

St. Louis won series 4–1

==== (3) Phoenix Coyotes vs. (6) Chicago Blackhawks ====
The Phoenix Coyotes entered the playoffs as the third seed in the Western Conference by winning the Pacific Division with 97 points. The Chicago Blackhawks earned 101 points during the regular season to finish sixth overall in the Western Conference. This was the first playoff series between these two teams. Phoenix won three of the games in this year's four-game regular season series.

This became only the second playoff series in NHL history in which the first five games went into overtime, the first being the 1951 Stanley Cup Final between the Toronto Maple Leafs and the Montreal Canadiens. Games one and two both saw the Blackhawks score the tying goal with less than 15 seconds left in regulation. In game two, Chicago's Andrew Shaw was ejected and later suspended for three games, after hitting Phoenix goaltender Mike Smith in the head. Smith laid on the ice for five minutes but remained in that game. Then in game three, the Coyotes' Raffi Torres hit the Blackhawks' Marian Hossa in the open ice. Hossa was carted out on a stretcher. Torres left his feet, Hossa did not have the puck when Torres hit him, and Torres did not receive a penalty during the game, Torres was later suspended for 25 games and next season's preseason games. The hit violated three rules: interference, charging, and hit to the head. Coyotes forward Mikkel Boedker scored the overtime winning goal in both games three and four, giving the Coyotes a 3–1 series lead, though Chicago was able to stave off elimination in Game five with a 2–1 overtime win, making it five consecutive games that the two teams required overtime. Game six ended up being one-sided as Smith shutout the Blackhawks, 4–0, and the Coyotes won their first playoff series since moving from Winnipeg to Phoenix in 1996, and the first one in franchise history since 1987.

April 12	Chicago Blackhawks	2–3	OT	Phoenix Coyotes	Jobing.com Arena	Recap
Jonathan Toews (1) – 04:04		First period		No scoring
No scoring		Second period		07:38 – Taylor Pyatt (1); 17:27 – Antoine Vermette (1)
Brent Seabrook (1) – 19:45		Third period		No scoring
No scoring		First overtime period		09:29 – Martin Hanzal (1)
Corey Crawford 31 saves / 34 shots		Goalie stats		Mike Smith 43 saves / 45 shots

April 14	Chicago Blackhawks	4–3	OT	Phoenix Coyotes	Jobing.com Arena	Recap
Bryan Bickell (1) – pp – 03:05		First period		08:52 – Raffi Torres (1); 13:44 – pp – Antoine Vermette (2)
Brandon Bollig (1) – 06:57		Second period		08:41 – pp – Antoine Vermette (3)
Patrick Sharp (1) – 19:54		Third period		No scoring
Bryan Bickell (2) – 10:36		First overtime period		No scoring
Corey Crawford 30 saves / 33 shots		Goalie stats		Mike Smith 46 saves / 50 shots

April 17	Phoenix Coyotes	3–2	OT	Chicago Blackhawks	United Center	Recap
No scoring		First period		19:31 – Andrew Brunette (1)
No scoring		Second period		No scoring
Rostislav Klesla (1) – 08:16; Ray Whitney (1) – 09:21		Third period		08:49 – Michael Frolik (1)
Mikkel Boedker (1) – 13:15		First overtime period		No scoring
Mike Smith 35 saves / 37 shots		Goalie stats		Corey Crawford 31 saves / 34 shots

April 19	Phoenix Coyotes	3–2	OT	Chicago Blackhawks	United Center	Recap
No scoring		First period		No scoring
No scoring		Second period		No scoring
Shane Doan (1) – 07:03; Taylor Pyatt (2) – 07:47		Third period		10:25 – Brendan Morrison (1); 18:34 – Michael Frolik (2)
Mikkel Boedker (2) – 02:15		First overtime period		No scoring
Mike Smith 30 saves / 32 shots		Goalie stats		Corey Crawford 16 saves / 19 shots

April 21	Chicago Blackhawks	2–1	OT	Phoenix Coyotes	Jobing.com Arena	Recap
No scoring		First period		No scoring
No scoring		Second period		02:46 – Gilbert Brule (1)
Nick Leddy (1) – 09:15		Third period		No scoring
Jonathan Toews (2) – 02:44		First overtime period		No scoring
Corey Crawford 18 saves / 19 shots		Goalie stats		Mike Smith 36 saves / 38 shots

April 23	Phoenix Coyotes	4–0	Chicago Blackhawks	United Center	Recap
No scoring		First period	No scoring
Oliver Ekman-Larsson (1) – pp – 13:14		Second period	No scoring
Gilbert Brule (2) – 02:24; Antoine Vermette (4) – pp – 13:04; Kyle Chipchura (1) – 14:56		Third period	No scoring
Mike Smith 39 saves / 39 shots		Goalie stats	Corey Crawford 16 saves / 20 shots

Phoenix won series 4–2

==== (4) Nashville Predators vs. (5) Detroit Red Wings ====
The Nashville Predators entered the playoffs as the fourth overall seed in the Western Conference with 104 points. The Detroit Red Wings earned 102 points during the regular season to finish fifth overall in the Western Conference. This was the third playoff series between these two teams, with Detroit having won both of the previous playoff series in six games, and the most recent matchup occurring in the 2008 Western Conference quarterfinals. The teams split this year's six-game regular season series.

The Predators defeated the Red Wings in five games, with four of them each being decided by only one goal. In the final seconds of game one, Nashville captain Shea Weber slammed Detroit's Henrik Zetterberg's head into the glass, cracking Zetterberg's helmet. Weber was later fined $2,500 for the action with no suspension or further disciplinary action. Although the Red Wings had the most home wins in the league during the regular season (with an overall home record of 31–7–3), the Predators won both games three and four on the road, Nashville's first-ever playoff victories at Joe Louis Arena.

April 11	Detroit Red Wings	2–3	Nashville Predators	Bridgestone Arena	Recap
No scoring		First period	06:59 – Paul Gaustad (1)
Henrik Zetterberg (1) – pp – 02:29		Second period	12:29 – Gabriel Bourque (1)
Tomas Holmstrom (1) – pp – 17:53		Third period	11:35 – Gabriel Bourque (2)
Jimmy Howard 23 saves / 26 shots		Goalie stats	Pekka Rinne 35 saves / 37 shots

April 13	Detroit Red Wings	3–2	Nashville Predators	Bridgestone Arena	Recap
Ian White (1) – 08:25; Cory Emmerton (1) – 15:33		First period	No scoring
Johan Franzen (1) – 09:57		Second period	09:01 – Andrei Kostitsyn (1)
No scoring		Third period	15:16 – Shea Weber (1)
Jimmy Howard 24 saves / 26 shots		Goalie stats	Pekka Rinne 14 saves / 17 shots

April 15	Nashville Predators	3–2	Detroit Red Wings	Joe Louis Arena	Recap
Shea Weber (2) – pp – 02:48		First period	No scoring
Kevin Klein (1) – 03:50		Second period	15:03 – Pavel Datsyuk (1)
Sergei Kostitsyn (1) – 16:30		Third period	19:06 – pp – Henrik Zetterberg (2)
Pekka Rinne 41 saves / 43 shots		Goalie stats	Jimmy Howard 19 saves / 22 shots

April 17	Nashville Predators	3–1	Detroit Red Wings	Joe Louis Arena	Recap
No scoring		First period	No scoring
No scoring		Second period	No scoring
Gabriel Bourque (3) – 01:55; Kevin Klein (2) – 06:25; David Legwand (1) – pp – 19:21		Third period	03:14 – pp – Jiri Hudler (1)
Pekka Rinne 40 saves / 41 shots		Goalie stats	Jimmy Howard 14 saves / 17 shots

April 20	Detroit Red Wings	1–2	Nashville Predators	Bridgestone Arena	Recap
No scoring		First period	16:10 – Alexander Radulov (1)
Jiri Hudler (2) – 13:45		Second period	No scoring
No scoring		Third period	00:13 – David Legwand (2)
Jimmy Howard 23 saves / 25 shots		Goalie stats	Pekka Rinne 21 saves / 22 shots

Nashville won series 4–1

== Conference semifinals ==
=== Eastern Conference semifinals ===
==== (1) New York Rangers vs. (7) Washington Capitals ====
This was the seventh playoff series between the Rangers and the Capitals, with Washington having won four of the previous six playoff series. This also was the third series between these two teams in the last four seasons, with the previous two series occurring in the 2009 and 2011 Eastern Conference quarterfinals, which Washington won 4–3 and 4–1, respectively. The teams split this year's four-game regular season series.

New York eliminated Washington in seven games. In game one, the Rangers scored two goals within 1:30 in the third period to take a 3–1 victory. The Capitals then took game two, 3–2, after Alexander Ovechkin scored the game-winning power-play goal with 7:27 left in the third period. Game three then ended at 14:41 of the third overtime with Marian Gaborik's goal to give New York a 2–1 win. This game was the 20th longest overtime game in NHL playoff history, the first 3OT game for the Rangers since 1971, and the longest overtime game in Rangers franchise history since 1939. New York also snapped a streak of seven consecutive playoff overtime losses, their last playoff overtime win coming in 2007. For Washington, it was the third-longest game in franchise history.

Washington evened the series in game four with Mike Green's power play goal with 5:48 remaining to give the Capitals a 2–1 win. In game five, with Washington leading 2–1 with 21.3 seconds remaining, Capitals forward Joel Ward took a double-minor penalty for high-sticking Rangers forward Carl Hagelin, and on the ensuing power play New York forward Brad Richards scored the game-tying goal with 6.6 seconds left in regulation, the latest game-tying playoff goal in Rangers franchise history. The Rangers remained on the power play to start the overtime period, with Ward serving the second half of his double-minor, and Rangers defenceman Marc Staal scored the game-winning goal at 1:35 of OT, completing the comeback. Washington rebounded in game six, winning 2–1 as goaltender Braden Holtby made 30 saves to force game seven. Brad Richards scored 1:32 into the first period to give the Rangers an early 1–0 lead game seven, then Michael Del Zotto scored in the third period to make it 2–0. Washington's Roman Hamrlik cut the score to 2–1 shortly after Del Zotto's goal, but the Capitals were unable to score another goal and lost the series. Through their first 14 games of the playoffs, the Rangers did not allow more than three goals in any of the games, setting an NHL record.

April 28	Washington Capitals	1–3	New York Rangers	Madison Square Garden	Recap
No scoring		First period	No scoring
Jason Chimera (2) – 19:56		Second period	12:38 – Artem Anisimov (1)
No scoring		Third period	07:00 – Chris Kreider (2); 08:30 – Brad Richards (3)
Braden Holtby 11 saves / 14 shots		Goalie stats	Henrik Lundqvist 17 saves / 18 shots

April 30	Washington Capitals	3–2	New York Rangers	Madison Square Garden	Recap
Mike Knuble (2) – 12:20; Jason Chimera (3) – 17:14		First period	19:17 – Brad Richards (4)
No scoring		Second period	No scoring
Alexander Ovechkin (3) – pp – 12:33		Third period	06:58 – pp – Michael Del Zotto (1)
Braden Holtby 26 saves / 28 shots		Goalie stats	Henrik Lundqvist 22 saves / 25 shots

May 2	New York Rangers	2–1	3OT	Washington Capitals	Verizon Center	Recap
No scoring		First period		No scoring
Ryan Callahan (3) – pp – 06:41		Second period		11:10 – John Carlson (1)
No scoring		Third period		No scoring
Marian Gaborik (2) – 14:41		Third overtime period		No scoring
Henrik Lundqvist 45 saves / 46 shots		Goalie stats		Braden Holtby 47 saves / 49 shots

May 5	New York Rangers	2–3	Washington Capitals	Verizon Center	Recap
No scoring		First period	12:43 – Alexander Ovechkin (4)
Artem Anisimov (2) – 01:10; Marian Gaborik (3) – 16:43		Second period	11:54 – Nicklas Backstrom (2)
No scoring		Third period	14:12 – pp – Mike Green (2)
Henrik Lundqvist 23 saves / 26 shots		Goalie stats	Braden Holtby 18 saves / 20 shots

May 7	Washington Capitals	2–3	OT	New York Rangers	Madison Square Garden	Recap
No scoring		First period		10:44 – Anton Stralman (3)
Brooks Laich (2) – 08:15		Second period		No scoring
John Carlson (2) – pp – 04:20		Third period		19:53 – pp – Brad Richards (5)
No scoring		First overtime period		01:35 – pp – Marc Staal (2)
Braden Holtby 35 saves / 38 shots		Goalie stats		Henrik Lundqvist 16 saves / 18 shots

May 9	New York Rangers	1–2	Washington Capitals	Verizon Center	Recap
No scoring		First period	01:28 – pp – Alexander Ovechkin (5)
No scoring		Second period	10:59 – Jason Chimera (4)
Marian Gaborik (4) – 19:09		Third period	No scoring
Henrik Lundqvist 21 saves / 23 shots		Goalie stats	Braden Holtby 30 saves / 31 shots

May 12	Washington Capitals	1–2	New York Rangers	Madison Square Garden	Recap
No scoring		First period	01:32 – Brad Richards (6)
No scoring		Second period	No scoring
Roman Hamrlik (1) – 10:43		Third period	10:05 – Michael Del Zotto (2)
Braden Holtby 29 saves / 31 shots		Goalie stats	Henrik Lundqvist 22 saves / 23 shots

New York won series 4–3

==== (5) Philadelphia Flyers vs. (6) New Jersey Devils ====
This was the fifth playoff series between these two teams, with each team having won two of the previous four playoff series. The most recent matchup occurred in the 2010 Eastern Conference quarterfinals, where the Flyers defeated the Devils in five games. The Atlantic division rivals split this year's six-game regular season series.

The Devils defeated the Flyers in five games. In each game of the series, the team that scored first ended up losing. Daniel Briere scored 4:36 into overtime of game one to give Philadelphia its lone victory of the series by the score of 4–3. New Jersey then scored four third-period goals in a 4–1 victory in game two. Alexei Ponikarovsky's goal 17:21 into overtime defeated the Flyers, 4–3, in game three. Then in game four, the Devils scored four unanswered goals to overcome a 2–0 deficit to win, 4–2. And finally in game five, New Jersey scored two first-period goals 3:18 apart en route to a 3–1 victory to win the series.

April 29	New Jersey Devils	3–4	OT	Philadelphia Flyers	Wells Fargo Center	Recap
Zach Parise (3) – 03:16		First period		No scoring
Travis Zajac (4) – pp – 13:53		Second period		08:07 – Daniel Briere (6); 08:44 – James van Riemsdyk (1)
Petr Sykora (1) – 11:22		Third period		04:19 – pp – Claude Giroux (7)
No scoring		First overtime period		04:36 – Daniel Briere (7)
Martin Brodeur 32 saves / 36 shots		Goalie stats		Ilya Bryzgalov 23 saves / 26 shots

May 1	New Jersey Devils	4–1	Philadelphia Flyers	Wells Fargo Center	Recap
No scoring		First period	02:53 – Matt Read (3)
No scoring		Second period	No scoring
Adam Larsson (1) – 03:08; David Clarkson (1) – 11:17; Travis Zajac (5) – 14:01; Bryce Salvador (1) – en – 17:09		Third period	No scoring
Martin Brodeur 19 saves / 20 shots		Goalie stats	Ilya Bryzgalov 31 saves / 34 shots

May 3	Philadelphia Flyers	3–4	OT	New Jersey Devils	Prudential Center	Recap
Brayden Schenn (3) – pp – 06:08		First period		12:33 – pp – Patrik Elias (3); 12:53 – Ilya Kovalchuk (4)
Matt Carle (2) – 04:44		Second period		No scoring
Daniel Briere (8) – 11:04		Third period		07:29 – Zach Parise (4)
No scoring		First overtime period		17:21 – Alexei Ponikarovsky (1)
Ilya Bryzgalov 27 saves / 31 shots		Goalie stats		Martin Brodeur 25 saves / 28 shots

May 6	Philadelphia Flyers	2–4	New Jersey Devils	Prudential Center	Recap
Scott Hartnell (3) – pp – 11:50; Claude Giroux (8) – sh – 13:40		First period	15:14 – pp – Petr Sykora (2); 18:09 – Marek Zidlicky (1)
No scoring		Second period	17:47 – Dainius Zubrus (2)
No scoring		Third period	19:15 – en – Dainius Zubrus (3)
Ilya Bryzgalov 39 saves / 42 shots		Goalie stats	Martin Brodeur 20 saves / 22 shots

May 8	New Jersey Devils	3–1	Philadelphia Flyers	Wells Fargo Center	Recap
Bryce Salvador (2) – 09:27; David Clarkson (2) – 12:45		First period	07:18 – Maxime Talbot (4)
No scoring		Second period	No scoring
Ilya Kovalchuk (5) – pp – 05:00		Third period	No scoring
Martin Brodeur 27 saves / 28 shots		Goalie stats	Ilya Bryzgalov 27 saves / 30 shots

New Jersey won series 4–1

=== Western Conference semifinals ===
==== (2) St. Louis Blues vs. (8) Los Angeles Kings ====
This was the third playoff series between these two teams, with St. Louis having swept Los Angeles out of both of the previous playoff series; the most recent matchup was in the 1998 Western Conference quarterfinals. Los Angeles won three of the games in this year's four-game regular season series.

The Kings swept the Blues to advance to the Western Conference finals for the first time since 1993. Los Angeles scored 15 total goals in the series, while goaltender Jonathan Quick only allowed six total St. Louis goals. This series marked the first time in Kings history that they swept a seven-game series, and the first time in NHL history the eighth seed defeated both the first and the second seeds. This was the only sweep of the entire playoffs.

April 28	Los Angeles Kings	3–1	St. Louis Blues	Scottrade Center	Recap
Slava Voynov (1) – 16:58		First period	09:16 – David Backes (2)
Matt Greene (1) – sh – 18:57		Second period	No scoring
Dustin Penner (2) – en – 19:45		Third period	No scoring
Jonathan Quick 28 saves / 29 shots		Goalie stats	Brian Elliott 26 saves / 28 shots

April 30	Los Angeles Kings	5–2	St. Louis Blues	Scottrade Center	Recap
Mike Richards (2) – 00:31; Anze Kopitar (2) – sh – 14:16; Jeff Carter (1) – 18:37; Anze Kopitar (3) – 19:43		First period	No scoring
Justin Williams (1) – 01:26		Second period	00:18 – Andy McDonald (5)
No scoring		Third period	05:16 – Matt D'Agostini (1)
Jonathan Quick 27 saves / 29 shots		Goalie stats	Brian Elliott 16 saves / 21 shots Jake Allen 0 saves / 0 shots

May 3	St. Louis Blues	2–4	Los Angeles Kings	Staples Center	Recap
No scoring		First period	13:33 – Justin Williams (2)
Chris Stewart (1) – 01:13		Second period	01:53 – Dwight King (1); 10:29 – pp – Mike Richards (3)
Chris Stewart (2) – 04:35		Third period	08:12 – Drew Doughty (1)
Brian Elliott 18 saves / 22 shots		Goalie stats	Jonathan Quick 18 saves / 20 shots

May 6	St. Louis Blues	1–3	Los Angeles Kings	Staples Center	Recap
Kevin Shattenkirk (1) – 11:34		First period	04:36 – Jordan Nolan (1); 18:17 – Dustin Brown (5)
No scoring		Second period	No scoring
No scoring		Third period	19:34 – en – Dustin Brown (6)
Brian Elliott 16 saves / 18 shots		Goalie stats	Jonathan Quick 23 saves / 24 shots

Los Angeles won series 4–0

==== (3) Phoenix Coyotes vs. (4) Nashville Predators ====
This was the first playoff series between these two teams. The teams split this year's four-game regular season series.

The Coyotes defeated the Predators in five games to advance to their first ever conference finals in team history. This also marked the first time that Phoenix jumped to a 2–0 series lead since 1987. Ray Whitney scored the overtime winner in the Coyotes' 4–3 victory in game one. In game two, four different Phoenix players each had a goal and an assist in their 5–3 win. The Predators bounced back in game three, with goaltender Pekka Rinne stopping all 32 shots in a 2–0 victory. Coyotes goaltender Mike Smith responded with a shutout of his own in game four, stopping 25 shots, while Shane Doan scoring the lone goal in a 1–0 Phoenix win. Smith then continued to hold Nashville scoreless until 14:01 of the third period of game five, and the Coyotes held on to a 2–1 victory to win the series. Nashville was without forwards Alexander Radulov and Andrei Kostitsyn for games three and four, as the team suspended both players for breaking team curfew prior to game three. This marked the last time that the Coyotes won a playoff series until 2020, when they defeated Nashville in the qualifying round. The series remains the franchise's most recent victory in a best of 7 game series.

April 27	Nashville Predators	3–4	OT	Phoenix Coyotes	Jobing.com Arena	Recap
Brandon Yip (1) – 14:09		First period		07:23 – pp – Radim Vrbata (1)
Andrei Kostitsyn (2) – 11:19		Second period		03:05 – Rostislav Klesla (2); 16:27 – Mikkel Boedker (3)
Martin Erat (1) – pp – 15:18		Third period		No scoring
No scoring		First overtime period		Ray Whitney (2) – 14:04
Pekka Rinne 20 saves / 24 shots		Goalie stats		Mike Smith 39 saves / 42 shots

April 29	Nashville Predators	3–5	Phoenix Coyotes	Jobing.com Arena	Recap
Andrei Kostitsyn (3) – 17:13		First period	08:32 – Antoine Vermette (5)
Patric Hornqvist (1) – pp – 11:20		Second period	03:47 – Martin Hanzal (2); 07:05 – Radim Vrbata (2); 11:50 – Taylor Pyatt (3)
Ryan Suter (1) – pp – 00:53		Third period	03:36 – Shane Doan (2)
Pekka Rinne 34 saves / 39 shots		Goalie stats	Mike Smith 30 saves / 33 shots

May 2	Phoenix Coyotes	0–2	Nashville Predators	Bridgestone Arena	Recap
No scoring		First period	08:10 – David Legwand (3); 09:16 – Mike Fisher (1)
No scoring		Second period	No scoring
No scoring		Third period	No scoring
Mike Smith 24 saves / 26 shots		Goalie stats	Pekka Rinne 32 saves / 32 shots

May 4	Phoenix Coyotes	1–0	Nashville Predators	Bridgestone Arena	Recap
Shane Doan (3) – 14:25		First period	No scoring
No scoring		Second period	No scoring
No scoring		Third period	No scoring
Mike Smith 25 saves / 25 shots		Goalie stats	Pekka Rinne 23 saves / 24 shots

May 7	Nashville Predators	1–2	Phoenix Coyotes	Jobing.com Arena	Recap
No scoring		First period	No scoring
No scoring		Second period	03:54 – Derek Morris (1); 15:09 – Martin Hanzal (3)
Colin Wilson (1) – 14:01		Third period	No scoring
Pekka Rinne 15 saves / 17 shots		Goalie stats	Mike Smith 32 saves / 33 shots

Phoenix won series 4–1

== Conference finals ==
=== Eastern Conference final ===
==== (1) New York Rangers vs. (6) New Jersey Devils ====
This was the sixth playoff series between these two rivals with New York winning four of the five previous series. They last met in the 2008 Eastern Conference quarterfinals, which the Rangers won in five games. The teams split this year's six-game regular season series. In 1994, the Rangers and the Devils also met in the Eastern Conference Final, with New York prevailing in seven games, en route to winning the 1994 Stanley Cup. The Devils reached the conference finals for the first time since beating the Mighty Ducks of Anaheim in the 2003 Stanley Cup Final, while the Rangers reached the conference finals for the first time since 1997, when they lost to rival Philadelphia Flyers.

The Rangers scored three unanswered goals in the third period, and goaltender Henrik Lundqvist stopped all 21 New Jersey shots, to take game one, 3–0. In game two, David Clarkson's score early in the third period broke a 2–2 tie to give the Devils a 3–2 victory. Game three then ended up being similar to game one, as New York scored another three unanswered goals in the third period, and Lundqvist stopped all 37 New Jersey shots, en route to a second 3–0 win in this series. With his fifth goal of the playoffs in game three, Rangers rookie forward Chris Kreider set an NHL record for goals and points (5 goals, 7 points) for a player in the playoffs before his first regular season game.

New Jersey then took game four, 4–1, as Devils goaltender Martin Brodeur made 28 saves and Zach Parise scored two goals. Game five ended up being a wild contest, as New Jersey scored three unanswered goals in the first period before New York tied it up early in the third period. Ryan Carter then scored at 15:36 of the third period, and Zach Parise added an empty-net goal, to give the Devils the 5–3 win. Adam Henrique's goal at 1:03 of overtime of game six then gave New Jersey a 3–2 victory to win the series. The Devils' did not win another playoff series until 2023 when they defeated the Rangers in seven games.

May 14	New Jersey Devils	0–3	New York Rangers	Madison Square Garden	Recap
No scoring		First period	No scoring
No scoring		Second period	No scoring
No scoring		Third period	00:53 – Daniel Girardi (2); 12:00 – pp – Chris Kreider (3); 18:33 – en – Artem Anisimov (3)
Martin Brodeur 25 saves / 27 shots		Goalie stats	Henrik Lundqvist 21 saves / 21 shots

May 16	New Jersey Devils	3–2	New York Rangers	Madison Square Garden	Recap
Ilya Kovalchuk (6) – pp – 13:39		First period	No scoring
Ryan Carter (2) – 18:09		Second period	02:23 – Marc Staal (3); 12:19 – pp – Chris Kreider (4)
David Clarkson (3) – 02:31		Third period	No scoring
Martin Brodeur 23 saves / 25 shots		Goalie stats	Henrik Lundqvist 24 saves / 27 shots

May 19	New York Rangers	3–0	New Jersey Devils	Prudential Center	Recap
No scoring		First period	No scoring
No scoring		Second period	No scoring
Daniel Girardi (3) – pp – 03:19; Chris Kreider (5) – 05:16; Ryan Callahan (4) – en – 17:47		Third period	No scoring
Henrik Lundqvist 36 saves / 36 shots		Goalie stats	Martin Brodeur 19 saves / 21 shots

May 21	New York Rangers	1–4	New Jersey Devils	Prudential Center	Recap
No scoring		First period	08:10 – Bryce Salvador (3); 11:59 – Travis Zajac (6)
No scoring		Second period	No scoring
Ruslan Fedotenko (1) – 14:55		Third period	02:41 – pp – Zach Parise (5); 18:31 – en – Zach Parise (6)
Henrik Lundqvist 26 saves / 29 shots		Goalie stats	Martin Brodeur 28 saves / 29 shots

May 23	New Jersey Devils	5–3	New York Rangers	Madison Square Garden	Recap
Stephen Gionta (3) – 02:43; Patrik Elias (4) – 04:13; Travis Zajac (7) – 09:49		First period	15:41 – Brandon Prust (1)
No scoring		Second period	00:32 – Ryan Callahan (5)
Ryan Carter (3) – 15:36; Zach Parise (7) – en – 19:28		Third period	00:17 – Marian Gaborik (5)
Martin Brodeur 25 saves / 28 shots		Goalie stats	Henrik Lundqvist 12 saves / 16 shots

May 25	New York Rangers	2–3	OT	New Jersey Devils	Prudential Center	Recap
No scoring		First period		10:05 – Ryan Carter (4); 13:56 – pp – Ilya Kovalchuk (7)
Ruslan Fedotenko (2) – 09:47; Ryan Callahan (6) – 13:41		Second period		No scoring
No scoring		Third period		No scoring
No scoring		First overtime period		01:03 – Adam Henrique (3)
Henrik Lundqvist 25 saves / 28 shots		Goalie stats		Martin Brodeur 33 saves / 35 shots

New Jersey won series 4–2

=== Western Conference final ===
==== (3) Phoenix Coyotes vs. (8) Los Angeles Kings ====
This was the first playoff series between these two teams. The Kings made their second conference finals appearance. They won their most recent appearance in the 1993 Campbell Conference final in seven games against the Toronto Maple Leafs. This marked the first conference finals appearance for Phoenix in their thirty-third season since entering the league as the Winnipeg Jets in 1979. The teams split this year's six-game regular season series.

The Kings defeated the Coyotes in five games, advancing to their first Cup Final since 1993. Los Angeles out-shot Phoenix in game one, 48–27, en route to a 4–2 win. The Kings then shut the Coyotes out in game two, 4–0, as goaltender Jonathan Quick made 24 saves and Jeff Carter scored a hat trick. Los Angeles then overcame an early 1–0 deficit to take game three, 2–1. However, Shane Doan scored Phoenix's only two goals, and goaltender Mike Smith stopped all 36 shots, to give the Coyotes a 2–0 victory in game four to extend the series. But Dustin Penner's goal at 17:42 of overtime of game five gave the Kings a 4–3 victory to win the series. The game five win extended the Kings' road playoff winning streak to ten games, eight of which came this season, both setting NHL playoff records. The Kings became only the second team to eliminate the top three seeds from the same postseason, after the 2003–04 Calgary Flames, and the second eighth-seeded to reach the Stanley Cup Final after the 2005–06 Edmonton Oilers. Game Five was the last Stanley Cup playoff game to be held at Jobing.com Arena.

May 13	Los Angeles Kings	4–2	Phoenix Coyotes	Jobing.com Arena	Recap
Anze Kopitar (4) – 03:53		First period	13:26 – Derek Morris (2)
Dwight King (2) – 08:02		Second period	18:05 – Mikkel Boedker (4)
Dustin Brown (7) – 02:11; Dwight King (3) – en – 19:12		Third period	No scoring
Jonathan Quick 25 saves / 27 shots		Goalie stats	Mike Smith 44 saves / 47 shots

May 15	Los Angeles Kings	4–0	Phoenix Coyotes	Jobing.com Arena	Recap
Dwight King (4) – 13:15		First period	No scoring
Jeff Carter (2) – 04:47; Jeff Carter (3) – pp – 18:49		Second period	No scoring
Jeff Carter (4) – pp – 12:56		Third period	No scoring
Jonathan Quick 24 saves / 24 shots		Goalie stats	Mike Smith 36 saves / 40 shots

May 17	Phoenix Coyotes	1–2	Los Angeles Kings	Staples Center	Recap
No scoring		First period	No scoring
Daymond Langkow (1) – 01:03		Second period	03:10 – Anze Kopitar (5)
No scoring		Third period	01:47 – Dwight King (5)
Mike Smith 26 saves / 28 shots		Goalie stats	Jonathan Quick 18 saves / 19 shots

May 20	Phoenix Coyotes	2–0	Los Angeles Kings	Staples Center	Recap
Shane Doan (4) – pp – 14:19		First period	No scoring
Shane Doan (5) – 11:10		Second period	No scoring
No scoring		Third period	No scoring
Mike Smith 36 saves / 36 shots		Goalie stats	Jonathan Quick 19 saves / 21 shots

May 22	Los Angeles Kings	4–3	OT	Phoenix Coyotes	Jobing.com Arena	Recap
Anze Kopitar (6) – sh – 11:13		First period		04:20 – pp – Taylor Pyatt (4)
Drew Doughty (2) – 11:06; Mike Richards (4) – 13:43		Second period		06:23 – Marc-Antoine Pouliot (1); 16:23 – Keith Yandle (1)
No scoring		Third period		No scoring
Dustin Penner (3) – 17:42		First overtime period		No scoring
Jonathan Quick 38 saves / 41 shots		Goalie stats		Mike Smith 47 saves / 51 shots

Los Angeles won series 4–1

== Stanley Cup Final ==
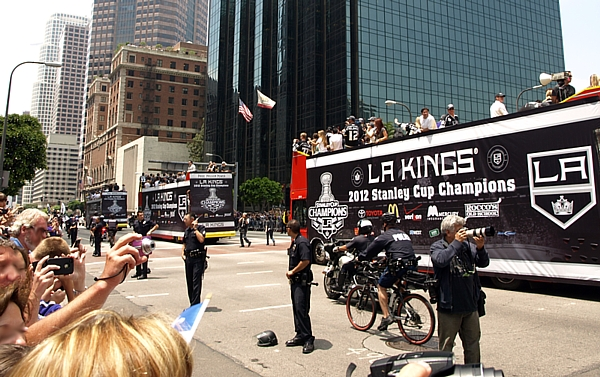
The Kings' 2012 Stanley Cup victory parade in downtown Los Angeles.

This was the first playoff series between the Kings and the Devils. The Devils defeated the Kings in both games in this year's two-game regular season series. This was New Jersey's fifth appearance in the Stanley Cup Final, and their first since the 2003 Cup win over Los Angeles's rival Mighty Ducks of Anaheim in seven games. This was Los Angeles's second Finals appearance; their only other appearance was a five-game Stanley Cup Final loss to the Montreal Canadiens in 1993. The combined seeds of the teams, 14, is the highest ever for the Stanley Cup Final. On June 11, 2012, the Kings defeated the Devils in six games and won their first Stanley Cup in franchise history. The Kings became the first and to date, only eighth-seeded team in North American sports history to win a championship.

By winning the first two games on the road in Newark, New Jersey, the Los Angeles Kings set the single-season consecutive playoff road winning record at ten. They also improved the record to twelve consecutive road wins going back to the 2011 NHL playoffs when they beat the San Jose Sharks the last two games played in San Jose.

May 30	Los Angeles Kings	2–1	OT	New Jersey Devils	Prudential Center	Recap
Colin Fraser (1) – 09:56		First period		No scoring
No scoring		Second period		18:48 – Anton Volchenkov (1)
No scoring		Third period		No scoring
Anze Kopitar (7) – 08:13		First overtime period		No scoring
Jonathan Quick 16 saves / 17 shots		Goalie stats		Martin Brodeur 23 saves / 25 shots

June 2	Los Angeles Kings	2–1	OT	New Jersey Devils	Prudential Center	Recap
Drew Doughty (3) – 07:49		First period		No scoring
No scoring		Second period		No scoring
No scoring		Third period		02:59 – Ryan Carter (5)
Jeff Carter (5) – 13:42		First overtime period		No scoring
Jonathan Quick 32 saves / 33 shots		Goalie stats		Martin Brodeur 30 saves / 32 shots

June 4	New Jersey Devils	0–4	Los Angeles Kings	Staples Center	Recap
No scoring		First period	No scoring
No scoring		Second period	05:40 – Alec Martinez (1); 15:07 – Anze Kopitar (8)
No scoring		Third period	04:15 – pp – Jeff Carter (6); 06:47 – pp – Justin Williams (3)
Martin Brodeur 17 saves / 21 shots		Goalie stats	Jonathan Quick 22 saves / 22 shots

June 6	New Jersey Devils	3–1	Los Angeles Kings	Staples Center	Recap
No scoring		First period	No scoring
No scoring		Second period	No scoring
Patrik Elias (5) – 07:56; Adam Henrique (4) – 15:29; Ilya Kovalchuk (8) – en – 19:40		Third period	08:56 – pp – Drew Doughty (4)
Martin Brodeur 21 saves / 22 shots		Goalie stats	Jonathan Quick 21 saves / 23 shots

June 9	Los Angeles Kings	1–2	New Jersey Devils	Prudential Center	Recap
No scoring		First period	12:45 – pp – Zach Parise (8)
Justin Williams (4) – 03:26		Second period	09:05 – Bryce Salvador (4)
No scoring		Third period	No scoring
Jonathan Quick 17 saves / 19 shots		Goalie stats	Martin Brodeur 25 saves / 26 shots

June 11	New Jersey Devils	1–6	Los Angeles Kings	Staples Center	Recap
No scoring		First period	11:03 – pp – Dustin Brown (8); 12:45 – pp – Jeff Carter (7); 15:01 – pp – Trevor Lewis (2)
Adam Henrique (5) – 18:45		Second period	01:30 – Jeff Carter (8)
No scoring		Third period	16:15 – en – Trevor Lewis (3); 16:30 – Matt Greene (2)
Martin Brodeur 19 saves / 24 shots		Goalie stats	Jonathan Quick 17 saves / 18 shots

Los Angeles won series 4–2

== Player statistics ==
=== Skaters ===
These are the top ten skaters based on points. If the list exceeds ten skaters because of a tie in points, goals take precedence, and all the tied skaters are shown.

Player	Team	GP	G	A	Pts	+/–	PIM
Dustin Brown	Los Angeles Kings	20	8	12	20	+16	34
Anze Kopitar	Los Angeles Kings	20	8	12	20	+16	9
Ilya Kovalchuk	New Jersey Devils	23	8	11	19	–7	6
Claude Giroux	Philadelphia Flyers	10	8	9	17	+2	13
Drew Doughty	Los Angeles Kings	20	4	12	16	+11	14
Zach Parise	New Jersey Devils	24	8	7	15	–8	4
Brad Richards	New York Rangers	20	6	9	15	–2	8
Mike Richards	Los Angeles Kings	20	4	11	15	+1	17
Justin Williams	Los Angeles Kings	20	4	11	15	+8	12
Travis Zajac	New Jersey Devils	24	7	7	14	–6	4

GP = Games played; G = Goals; A = Assists; Pts = Points; +/– = Plus/minus; PIM = Penalties in minutes

=== Goaltending ===
This is a combined table of the top five goaltenders based on goals against average and the top five goaltenders based on save percentage, with at least 420 minutes played. The table is sorted by GAA, and the criteria for inclusion are bolded.

Player	Team	GP	W	L	SA	GA	GAA	SV%	SO	TOI
Jonathan Quick	Los Angeles Kings	20	16	4	538	29	**1.41**	**.946**	3	1238:12
Henrik Lundqvist	New York Rangers	20	10	10	554	38	**1.82**	**.931**	3	1250:49
Braden Holtby	Washington Capitals	14	7	7	459	30	**1.95**	**.935**	0	921:56
Mike Smith	Phoenix Coyotes	16	9	7	602	34	**1.99**	**.944**	3	1026:49
Pekka Rinne	Nashville Predators	10	5	5	296	21	**2.07**	**.929**	1	609:14

GP = Games played; W = Wins; L = Losses; SA = Shots against; GA = Goals against; GAA = Goals against average; SV% = Save percentage; SO = Shutouts; TOI = Time on ice (minutes:seconds)

== Television ==
National Canadian English-language coverage of the first three rounds of the playoffs were split between CBC and TSN. This was the fourth year of a six-year agreement in which CBC and TSN selected the rights to individual series in the first three rounds using a draft-like setup. CBC held exclusive rights to the Stanley Cup Final. French-language telecasts were broadcast on RDS and RDS2.

As part of the NHL's new American TV contract with NBC, this was the first time that all playoffs are aired nationally in the United States on NBC, NBC Sports Network, CNBC, and NHL Network. American regional sports networks still carried their teams' first-round games, but all games from the second round onward were exclusive to one of NBC's networks.

After the completion of the quarterfinals, the games on the NBC networks garnered the best ever TV rating for NHL games in the United States. The most watched Quarterfinals game ever was game six between Boston and Washington.

Preceded by 2011 Stanley Cup playoffs	Stanley Cup playoffs 2012	Succeeded by 2013 Stanley Cup playoffs
