= Stephen Gionta =

American ice hockey player (born 1983)

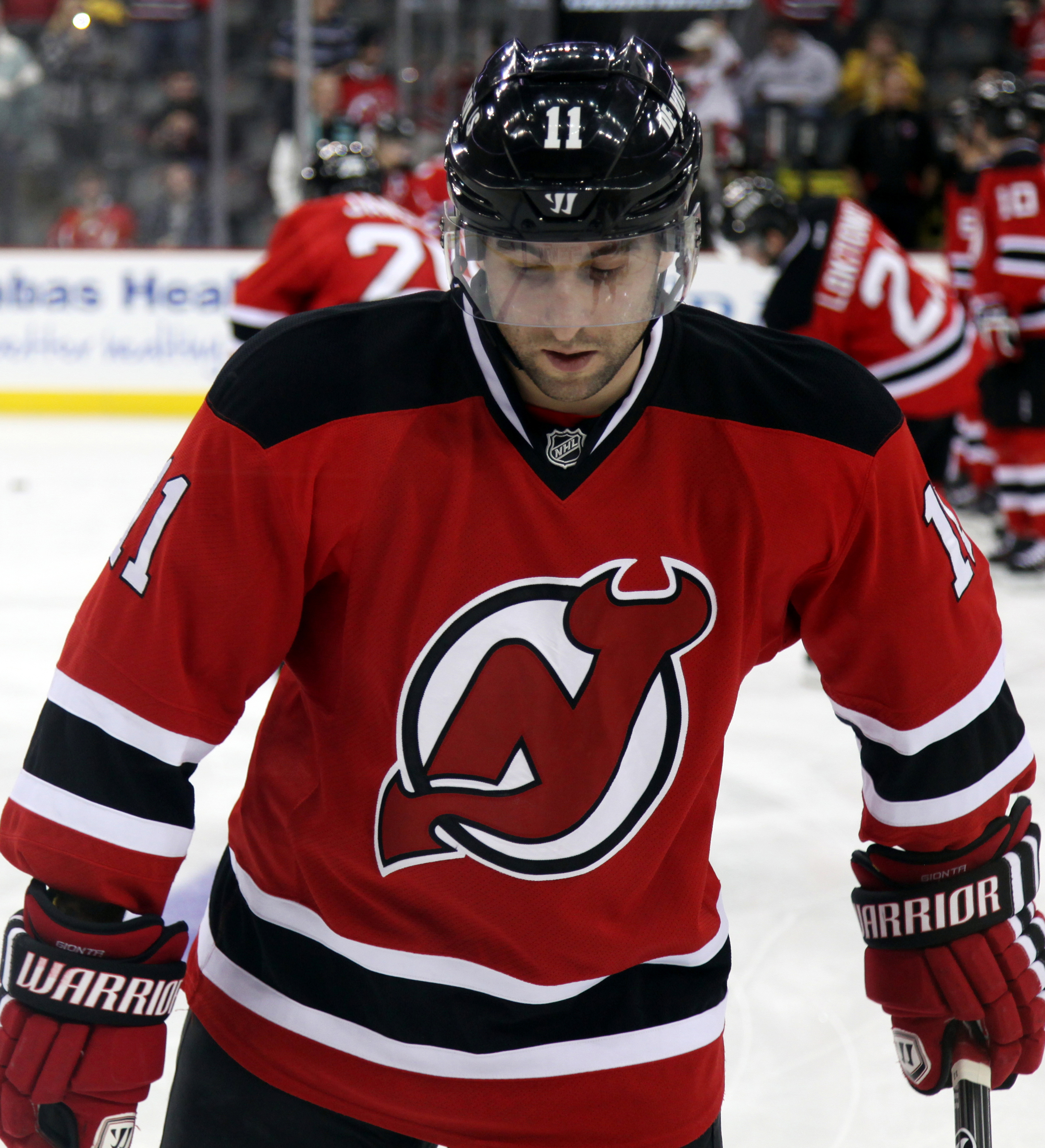
- Gionta with the New Jersey Devils in 2013
- Born: October 9, 1983 (age 42) Rochester, New York, U.S.
- Height: 5 ft 7 in (170 cm)
- Weight: 180 lb (82 kg; 12 st 12 lb)
- Position: Centre
- Shot: Right
- Played for: New Jersey Devils; New York Islanders
- National team: United States
- NHL draft: Undrafted
- Playing career: 2006–2019

Stephen Michael Gionta (born October 9, 1983) is an American former professional ice hockey centre. He played in the National Hockey League (NHL) with the New Jersey Devils and New York Islanders. Gionta is the younger brother of Brian Gionta, who played for the Devils from 2001 to 2009.

== Playing career ==
As a youth, Gionta played in the 1997 Quebec International Pee-Wee Hockey Tournament with a minor ice hockey team from Rochester, New York.

Gionta was not drafted by any team. However, after graduating from Boston College he signed an amateur tryout agreement with the Albany River Rats. The River Rats were the American Hockey League (AHL) affiliate of the New Jersey Devils, the team in which his older brother Brian was a member of. Gionta made his professional debut at the end of the 2005-06 season with the River Rats. Gionta's first ever AHL game was on April 13, 2006 against the Springfield Falcons. Gionta led his team to a 5–3 victory by scoring 3 goals and adding 1 assist. He was named the first star of the game.

After spending the next few seasons in the minor leagues, Gionta was called up by the Devils during the 2010-11 season. He made his debut on November 5, 2010 in a 3–0 loss to the New York Rangers. Gionta went scoreless in 12 games for the Devils that season.

On April 12, 2012, Gionta scored his first career NHL goal. The goal, which was the game-winning goal, was scored against Craig Anderson of the Ottawa Senators. The Devils won the game 4–2, while Gionta received first star honors of the game. During the 2012 postseason, Gionta skated in 24 games with the Devils, recording three goals and four assists. The Devils advanced to the 2012 Stanley Cup Final, but fell to the Los Angeles Kings.

On June 29, 2012, Gionta re-signed with the New Jersey Devils on a two-year contract. On July 1, 2014, Gionta re-signed for another two years.

After 11 seasons with the Devils, Gionta's association with the club ended as he was out of contract to become a free agent. Unsigned over the following summer, Gionta accepted a professional try-out contract to attend the New York Islanders' training camp on September 12, 2016. At the end of training camp, he signed a one-year deal with the Islanders' AHL affiliate, the Bridgeport Sound Tigers. On December 21, 2016, Gionta agreed to a one-year, two-way deal with the Islanders. On August 8, 2017, Gionta re-signed with the Islanders to another one-year deal. On October 2, 2017, Gionta was placed on waivers so he can be assigned to the AHL affiliate Bridgeport Sound Tigers.

On October 13, 2018, Gionta returned to the Islanders, signing a one-year, two-way contract. He featured in five games with the Islanders, going scoreless before he was assigned to play out the remainder of his contract in a return to the Bridgeport Sound Tigers.

On August 1, 2019, Gionta announced his retirement from professional hockey after a 13-year playing career, accepting work as a professional scout for the Tampa Bay Lightning.

== Career statistics ==
=== Regular season and playoffs ===
			Regular season					Playoffs
Season	Team	League	GP	G	A	Pts	PIM	GP	G	A	Pts	PIM
1999–00	Rochester Jr. Americans	NAHL	41	11	15	26	56	—	—	—	—	—
2000–01	U.S. National Development Team	USDP	17	1	2	3	12	—	—	—	—	—
2001–02	U.S. National Development Team	USDP	25	2	5	7	33	—	—	—	—	—
2002–03	Boston College	HE	33	5	10	15	36	—	—	—	—	—
2003–04	Boston College	HE	41	9	15	24	36	—	—	—	—	—
2004–05	Boston College	HE	38	8	11	19	44	—	—	—	—	—
2005–06	Boston College	HE	39	11	21	32	66	—	—	—	—	—
2005–06	Albany River Rats	AHL	3	5	1	6	2	—	—	—	—	—
2006–07	Lowell Devils	AHL	67	7	8	15	15	—	—	—	—	—
2007–08	Lowell Devils	AHL	63	16	13	29	33	—	—	—	—	—
2008–09	Lowell Devils	AHL	52	2	9	11	30	—	—	—	—	—
2009–10	Lowell Devils	AHL	68	15	19	34	26	5	0	1	1	0
2010–11	Albany Devils	AHL	54	10	20	30	21	—	—	—	—	—
2010–11	New Jersey Devils	NHL	12	0	0	0	6	—	—	—	—	—
2011–12	Albany Devils	AHL	56	6	10	16	40	—	—	—	—	—
2011–12	New Jersey Devils	NHL	1	1	0	1	0	24	3	4	7	4
2012–13	Albany Devils	AHL	11	2	3	5	4	—	—	—	—	—
2012–13	New Jersey Devils	NHL	48	4	10	14	14	—	—	—	—	—
2013–14	New Jersey Devils	NHL	66	4	7	11	18	—	—	—	—	—
2014–15	New Jersey Devils	NHL	61	5	8	13	12	—	—	—	—	—
2015–16	New Jersey Devils	NHL	82	1	10	11	43	—	—	—	—	—
2016–17	Bridgeport Sound Tigers	AHL	7	1	2	3	2	—	—	—	—	—
2016–17	New York Islanders	NHL	26	1	5	6	2	—	—	—	—	—
2017–18	Bridgeport Sound Tigers	AHL	30	2	3	5	13	—	—	—	—	—
2018–19	New York Islanders	NHL	5	0	0	0	0	—	—	—	—	—
2018–19	Bridgeport Sound Tigers	AHL	26	2	2	4	8	5	1	0	1	2
NHL totals			301	16	40	56	95	24	3	4	7	4

Medal record

Representing the United States

Ice hockey

Ice Hockey World Championships
Bronze medal – third place	2013 Sweden/Finland	

=== International ===
Year	Team	Event	Result	GP	G	A	Pts	PIM
2001	United States	WJC18	6th	6	2	0	2	4
2013	United States	WC	3rd place, bronze medalist(s)	10	3	0	3	2
Junior totals				6	2	0	2	4
Senior totals				10	3	0	3	2
