= Mike Smith (ice hockey, born 1982) =

Canadian ice hockey player (born 1982)

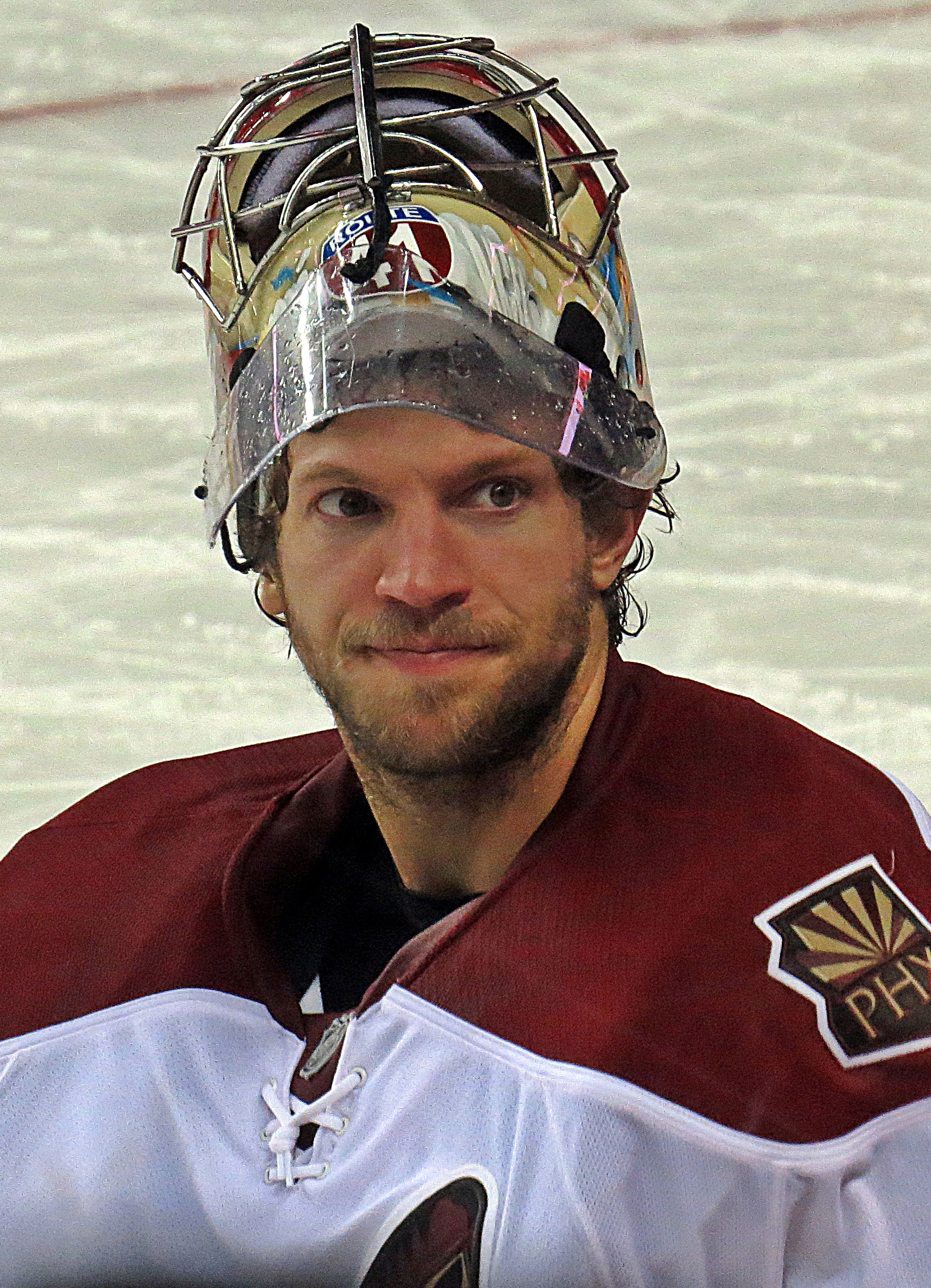
- Smith with the Phoenix Coyotes in 2014
- Born: March 22, 1982 (age 44) Kingston, Ontario, Canada
- Height: 6 ft 5 in (196 cm)
- Weight: 220 lb (100 kg; 15 st 10 lb)
- Position: Goaltender
- Caught: Left
- Played for: Dallas Stars; Tampa Bay Lightning; Arizona Coyotes; Calgary Flames; Edmonton Oilers
- National team: Canada
- NHL draft: 161st overall, 2001; Dallas Stars
- Playing career: 2002–2022

Mike Smith (born March 22, 1982) is a Canadian former professional ice hockey goaltender. Smith played 16 seasons in the National Hockey League (NHL) for the Dallas Stars, Tampa Bay Lightning, Phoenix/Arizona Coyotes, Calgary Flames, and the Edmonton Oilers. Smith is the 11th goaltender in NHL history to score a goal, which he did in the 2013–14 season against the Detroit Red Wings. A two-time NHL All-Star (2017, 2018), he was named to the Canada national team for the 2014 Winter Olympics where he won a gold medal.

Selected by the Dallas Stars in the 2001 NHL entry draft, Smith played in the American Hockey League (AHL) for the Utah Grizzlies, Houston Aeros, and the Iowa Stars. Smith also played for the Lexington Men O'War of the East Coast Hockey League (ECHL) in 2002–03. After playing five seasons in the minors, Smith had his NHL debut on October 21, 2006, playing for the Dallas Stars against the Phoenix Coyotes putting up a 22-save shutout, making him the first goalie in Dallas Stars history to have a shutout in his first NHL game. Smith was named to the 2006–07 NHL All-Rookie Team.

== Playing career ==
=== Junior hockey ===
Smith began his ice hockey career in 1999 playing for his hometown Kingston Frontenacs of the Ontario Hockey League (OHL). That season, he played 15 games while backing up future NHL player Andrew Raycroft.

After the start of the 2000–01 season, Smith moved to the Sudbury Wolves, where he played 43 games, registering a 2.52 goals against average (GAA) and 0.913 save percentage in the regular season. The Wolves made it to the second round of the playoffs that year with Smith in net.

=== Dallas Stars (2006–2008) ===
In the 2001 NHL entry draft, Smith was drafted by the Dallas Stars in the fifth round (161st overall), and continued to play in Sudbury, again taking the Wolves into the post-season. Their playoff run ended in four games, however, as the Barrie Colts won the series 4–0.

The subsequent season saw Smith's departure from the junior leagues when he split the season between the Lexington Men O' War of the ECHL and the Utah Grizzlies of the American Hockey League (AHL).

Smith made his professional debut on October 26, 2002, against the Dayton Bombers, scoring a statistically unlikely goal during a shutout in his first win, scoring on an empty net at 19:04 in the third period. Smith is the youngest goaltender ever to score in a professional game, doing so at 20 years of age.

Smith played only 11 games in Utah, backing up Jason Bacashihua and Corey Hirsch. For 2003–04, Utah added Dan Ellis to their roster, with whom Smith split back up duties, again to Bacashihua. Smith went to play for the Houston Aeros in 2004–05, sharing the net almost equally with Josh Harding, putting up a 0.915 save percentage and 2.42 GAA.

Smith joined the Iowa Stars for their inaugural season in 2005–06. The Stars played Smith and Dan Ellis back and forth for much of the season until Smith appeared to take much of the netminding responsibilities late in the season. A Stars rally in the stretch secured the final Western Conference playoff spot. Smith started in every game of the seven-game series against the Milwaukee Admirals, which Milwaukee ultimately won.

Smith underwent shoulder surgery during the off-season for an injury he sustained during Iowa's 2005–06 season. After a faster-than-expected recovery, Smith attended the Dallas Stars' training camp in the fall of 2006, and was awarded the backup goaltender position behind Marty Turco. In his first-ever regulation NHL game on October 21, 2006, Smith stopped 22 shots to post a shutout against the Phoenix Coyotes.

On January 4, 2007, Smith was hit in the mask by a slap shot, causing him to miss a few weeks with a concussion. He came back strong, however, winning two games in which Turco was pulled. He then registered a 32-save shutout over the Anaheim Ducks on February 10.

Smith also started the year living with Marty Turco's family. However, he eventually moved out and then signed a two-year, $950,000 per year contract with the Stars.

On June 14, 2007, Smith was named to the 2006–07 NHL All-Rookie Team.

=== Tampa Bay Lightning (2007–2011) ===
On February 26, 2008, Smith was traded, along with Jussi Jokinen, Jeff Halpern and a 2009 fourth-round draft pick, to the Tampa Bay Lightning in exchange for Brad Richards and Johan Holmqvist. Smith made his Lightning debut the following night against the Minnesota Wild, stopping 24 of 27 shots in a 3–2 loss.

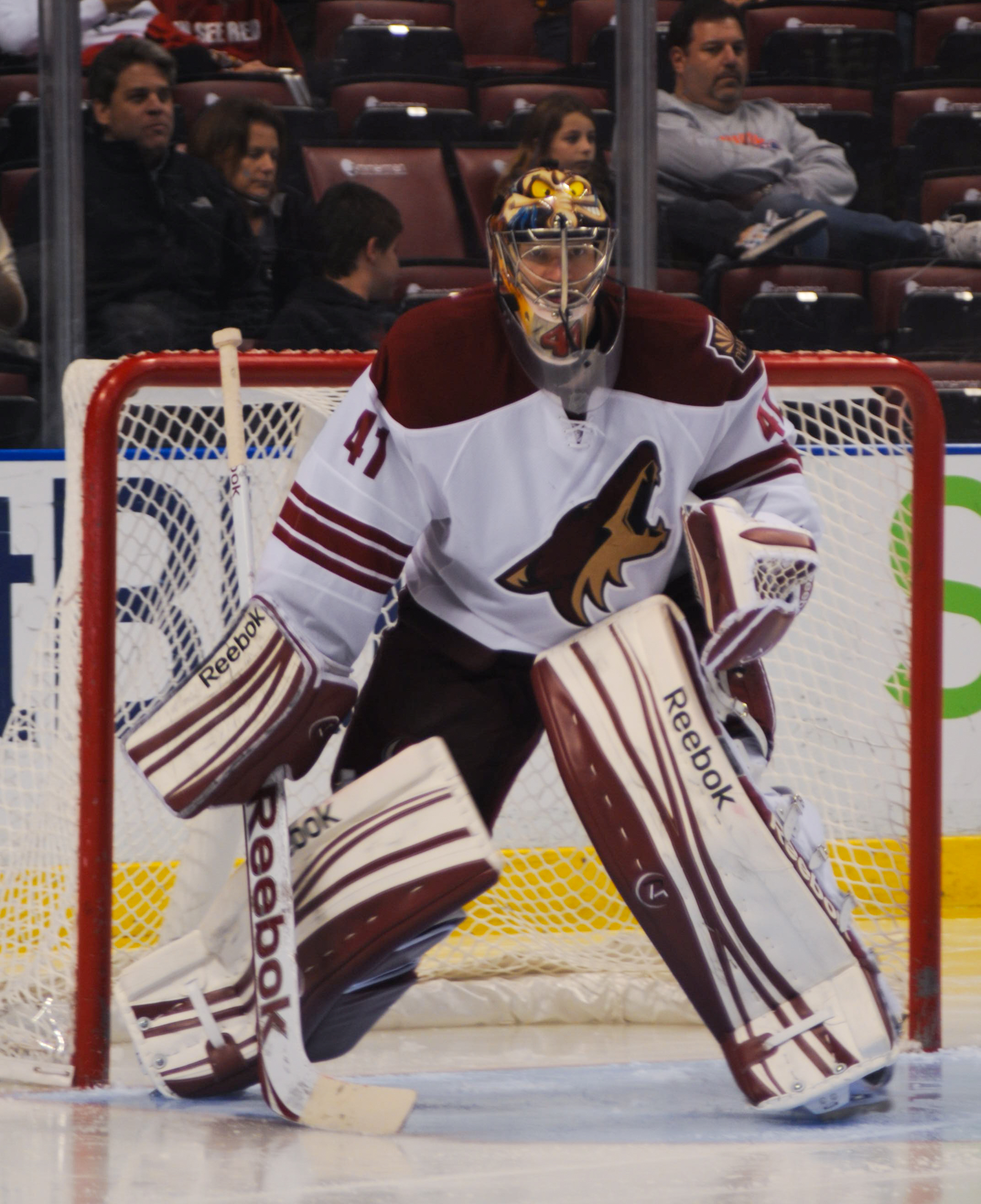
Smith with the Coyotes during the 2011–12 season

On March 15, Smith recorded a 3–0 shutout victory over the New York Rangers. He became only the third rookie goaltender in NHL history to record a shutout for two different teams in the same season, and the first to do so in 79 years. Smith recorded 14 wins for the Lightning during the 2008–09 season before suffering a concussion that kept him out of action for the remainder of the season. On February 2, 2011, the Lightning placed Smith on waivers, where he cleared the next day and was subsequently assigned to the Lightning's AHL affiliate, the Norfolk Admirals. He returned to Tampa Bay later in the season, however, and, backing up Dwayne Roloson during the Lightning's 2011 playoff run, made his playoff debut in place of Roloson in the third period of Game 2 of the Eastern Conference Finals against the Boston Bruins.

=== Phoenix/Arizona Coyotes (2011–2017) ===
On July 1, 2011, Smith signed a two-year contract worth $2 million with the Phoenix Coyotes. Smith set the NHL record for the most saves in a regulation shutout victory, as he stopped all 54 shots he faced in a 2–0 win over the Columbus Blue Jackets on April 3, 2012. However, his record was later surpassed on January 29, 2014, when Ben Scrivens stopped 59 shots in a 3–0 win for the Edmonton Oilers over the San Jose Sharks. He went on to record an impressive 38 wins in his first season in Phoenix, as the Coyotes qualified for their third consecutive playoff berth, and finished fourth in voting for the Vezina Trophy, awarded to the league's top goaltender.

In the 2012 Stanley Cup playoffs, Smith led the Coyotes to their first playoff series win since 1987, beating the Chicago Blackhawks 4–2 in the series. Smith and the Coyotes went on to defeat the Nashville Predators in the Western conference semi-finals, winning the series 4–1. The Coyotes then faced the eventual Stanley Cup champions Los Angeles Kings in the Western Conference Finals, losing the series 4–1. He posted a superb 1.99 GAA and a .944 save percentage, some of the best numbers for starting goaltenders in the playoffs.

On July 5, 2013, Smith signed a six-year contract extension with the Coyotes worth $34 million.

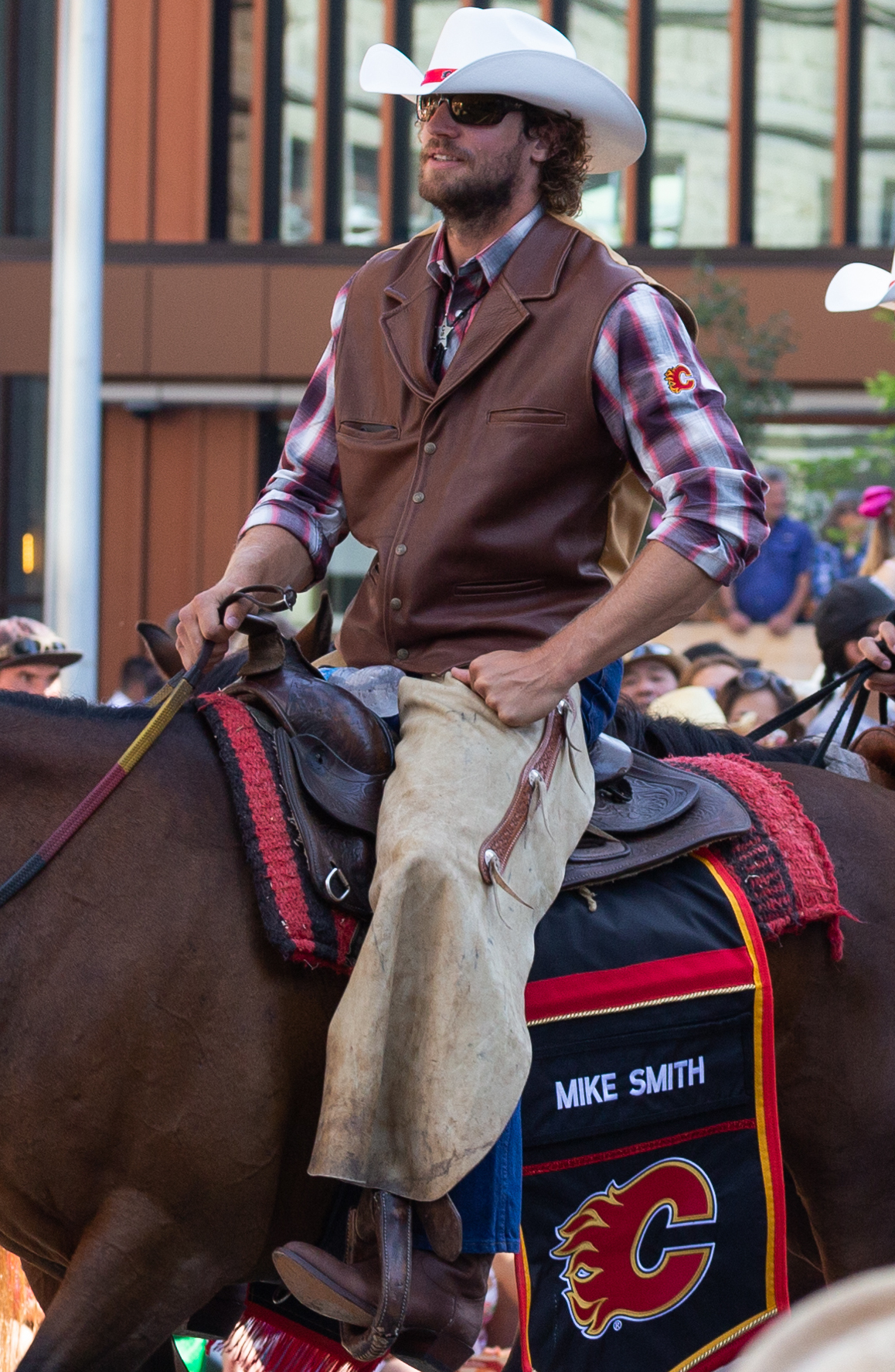
Smith in the 2018 Calgary Stampede parade

On October 19, 2013, Smith became the seventh NHL goalie to score a goal with a shot on goal (four other goaltenders have been credited based on own-goals by the opposition). Smith scored with 0.1 seconds left in regulation on an empty net during a win against the Detroit Red Wings. Two months later, Smith scored on himself when, as a result of the hockey puck getting lodged into his waistband, he inadvertently backed into his own net and scored an own goal. The "butt goal" handed the game to the Buffalo Sabres, as the game was in overtime.

=== Calgary Flames (2017–2019) ===
On June 17, 2017, Smith was traded to the Calgary Flames in exchange for goalie Chad Johnson, prospect Brandon Hickey, and a conditional 2017 third-round pick.

Smith played his 500th career NHL game on December 9, 2017. This made him the 11th active goalie to reach the milestone and tied him with Jeff Hackett for 69th place on the all-time list.

After being glanced over for the 2018 NHL All-Star Game, Smith was invited as a replacement for Los Angeles Kings goalie Jonathan Quick, who declined his invitation due to a nagging injury. In his second season with the Flames, Smith helped lead the Flames to first place in the Western Conference, and he therefore made his second playoff appearance of his career. However, the Flames were quickly eliminated by the Colorado Avalanche in the first round 4–1 in the series.

=== Edmonton Oilers (2019–2022) ===
On July 1, 2019, Smith was signed by the Edmonton Oilers to a one-year, $2-million contract.

On October 10, 2020, the Oilers re-signed Smith to a one-year, $2 million contract.

On July 21, 2021, the Oilers re-signed Smith to a two-year, $4.4 million extension.

In the 2022 Stanley Cup playoffs, Smith, who spent most of the season as the second string goaltender as a result of various injuries, made the start over Mikko Koskinen, marking his second career Western Conference finals appearance. He helped the Oilers take home two series wins against the Los Angeles Kings and the Calgary Flames, winning each series 4–3 and 4–1 respectively. The Oilers faced the eventual Stanley Cup champions Colorado Avalanche, losing the series 4–0 in a sweep. At the conclusion of the playoffs, Smith led the league in playoff shutouts with two. In the off-season, Smith failed his physical and was placed on long-term injured reserve prior to the start of the 2022–23 NHL season, which allowed him to recover from a string of injuries sustained from the previous season.

== International play ==
Medal record

Representing Canada

Men's ice hockey

Winter Olympics
| Gold medal – first place | 2014 Sochi | |

World Championships
| Gold medal – first place | 2015 Czech Republic | |

Smith won a gold medal with Canada's 2014 Winter Olympic team, dressing as a backup for one of Canada's group games. He did not see any ice time and was primarily the third choice goaltender. He also won gold at the 2015 world championships as Canada's starting goalie, going 8–0 through the tournament and recording a shutout streak of 190:03 in the medal round (the final three games).

== Personal life ==
Smith was raised in Verona, Ontario.

Smith and Canadian former World Cup skier Brigitte Acton married September 3, 2010. The couple have four children together.

== Career statistics ==
=== Regular season and playoffs ===
Bold indicates led league

| | | | Regular season | | | | | | | | | | Playoffs |
| Season | Team | League | GP | W | L | T | OTL | MIN | GA | SO | GAA | SV% | GP | W | L | MIN | GA | SO | GAA | SV% |
|---|---|---|---|---|---|---|---|---|---|---|---|---|---|---|---|---|---|---|---|---|
| 1998–99 | Kingston Voyageurs | OPJHL | 16 | — | — | — | — | 906 | 53 | 0 | 3.51 | — | — | — | — | — | — | — | — | — |
| 1999–00 | Kingston Voyageurs | OPJHL | 3 | — | — | — | — | — | — | — | — | — | — | — | — | — | — | — | — | — |
| 1999–00 | Kingston Frontenacs | OHL | 15 | 4 | 4 | 7 | 1 | 666 | 42 | 0 | 3.78 | .894 | — | — | — | — | — | — | — | — |
| 2000–01 | Kingston Frontenacs | OHL | 3 | 0 | 0 | 3 | 0 | 137 | 8 | 0 | 3.51 | .896 | — | — | — | — | — | — | — | — |
| 2000–01 | Sudbury Wolves | OHL | 43 | 22 | 10 | 11 | 3 | 2,572 | 108 | 3 | 2.52 | .920 | 12 | 7 | 5 | 735 | 26 | 2 | 2.12 | .921 |
| 2001–02 | Sudbury Wolves | OHL | 53 | 19 | 24 | 10 | 4 | 3,083 | 157 | 3 | 3.06 | .921 | 5 | 1 | 4 | 303 | 15 | 0 | 2.97 | .924 |
| 2002–03 | Lexington Men O' War | ECHL | 27 | 11 | 10 | 4 | — | 1,553 | 66 | 1 | 2.55 | .910 | 2 | 0 | 1 | 93 | 8 | 0 | 5.14 | .822 |
| 2002–03 | Utah Grizzlies | AHL | 11 | 5 | 5 | 0 | — | 614 | 33 | 0 | 3.23 | .906 | — | — | — | — | — | — | — | — |
| 2003–04 | Utah Grizzlies | AHL | 21 | 8 | 11 | 0 | — | 1,186 | 56 | 2 | 2.83 | .908 | — | — | — | — | — | — | — | — |
| 2004–05 | Houston Aeros | AHL | 45 | 19 | 17 | 3 | — | 2,408 | 97 | 5 | 2.42 | .915 | 3 | 1 | 2 | 181 | 4 | 0 | 1.33 | .957 |
| 2005–06 | Iowa Stars | AHL | 50 | 25 | 19 | 6 | — | 2,998 | 125 | 3 | 2.50 | .917 | 7 | 3 | 4 | 417 | 19 | 0 | 2.74 | .907 |
| 2006–07 | Dallas Stars | NHL | 23 | 12 | 5 | — | 2 | 1,213 | 45 | 3 | 2.23 | .912 | — | — | — | — | — | — | — | — |
| 2007–08 | Dallas Stars | NHL | 21 | 12 | 9 | — | 0 | 1,172 | 48 | 2 | 2.46 | .906 | — | — | — | — | — | — | — | — |
| 2007–08 | Tampa Bay Lightning | NHL | 13 | 3 | 10 | — | 0 | 774 | 36 | 1 | 2.79 | .893 | — | — | — | — | — | — | — | — |
| 2008–09 | Tampa Bay Lightning | NHL | 41 | 14 | 18 | — | 9 | 2,471 | 108 | 2 | 2.62 | .916 | — | — | — | — | — | — | — | — |
| 2009–10 | Tampa Bay Lightning | NHL | 42 | 13 | 18 | — | 7 | 2,273 | 117 | 2 | 3.09 | .900 | — | — | — | — | — | — | — | — |
| 2010–11 | Norfolk Admirals | AHL | 5 | 1 | 4 | — | 0 | 296 | 9 | 1 | 1.83 | .924 | — | — | — | — | — | — | — | — |
| 2010–11 | Tampa Bay Lightning | NHL | 22 | 13 | 6 | — | 1 | 1,202 | 58 | 1 | 2.90 | .899 | 3 | 1 | 1 | 120 | 2 | 0 | 1.00 | .958 |
| 2011–12 | Phoenix Coyotes | NHL | 67 | 38 | 18 | — | 10 | 3,903 | 144 | 8 | 2.21 | .930 | 16 | 9 | 7 | 1,027 | 34 | 3 | 1.99 | .944 |
| 2012–13 | Phoenix Coyotes | NHL | 34 | 15 | 12 | — | 5 | 1,956 | 84 | 5 | 2.58 | .910 | — | — | — | — | — | — | — | — |
| 2013–14 | Phoenix Coyotes | NHL | 62 | 27 | 21 | — | 10 | 3,610 | 159 | 3 | 2.64 | .915 | — | — | — | — | — | — | — | — |
| 2014–15 | Arizona Coyotes | NHL | 62 | 14 | 42 | — | 5 | 3,556 | 187 | 0 | 3.16 | .904 | — | — | — | — | — | — | — | — |
| 2015–16 | Arizona Coyotes | NHL | 32 | 15 | 13 | — | 2 | 1,754 | 77 | 3 | 2.63 | .916 | — | — | — | — | — | — | — | — |
| 2016–17 | Arizona Coyotes | NHL | 55 | 19 | 26 | — | 9 | 3,203 | 156 | 3 | 2.92 | .914 | — | — | — | — | — | — | — | — |
| 2017–18 | Calgary Flames | NHL | 55 | 25 | 22 | — | 6 | 3,191 | 141 | 3 | 2.65 | .916 | — | — | — | — | — | — | — | — |
| 2018–19 | Calgary Flames | NHL | 42 | 23 | 16 | — | 2 | 2,400 | 109 | 2 | 2.72 | .898 | 5 | 1 | 4 | 319 | 17 | 1 | 3.20 | .917 |
| 2019–20 | Edmonton Oilers | NHL | 39 | 19 | 12 | — | 6 | 2,157 | 106 | 1 | 2.95 | .902 | 1 | 0 | 1 | 27 | 5 | 0 | 11.31 | .783 |
| 2020–21 | Edmonton Oilers | NHL | 32 | 21 | 6 | — | 2 | 1,847 | 71 | 3 | 2.31 | .923 | 4 | 0 | 4 | 300 | 12 | 0 | 2.40 | .912 |
| 2021–22 | Edmonton Oilers | NHL | 28 | 16 | 9 | — | 2 | 1,580 | 74 | 2 | 2.81 | .915 | 16 | 8 | 6 | 871 | 49 | **2** | 3.38 | .913 |
| NHL totals | | | 670 | 299 | 263 | — | 78 | 38,260 | 1,720 | 44 | 2.70 | .912 | 45 | 19 | 23 | 2,663 | 119 | 6 | 2.68 | .924 |

=== International ===
| Year | Team | Event | Result | GP | W | L | T/OTL | MIN | GA | SO | GAA | SV% |
|---|---|---|---|---|---|---|---|---|---|---|---|---|
| 2013 | Canada | WC | 5th | 4 | 2 | 2 | 0 | 255 | 7 | 1 | 1.65 | .944 |
| 2014 | Canada | OLY | 1st place, gold medalist(s) | — | — | — | — | — | — | — | — | — |
| 2015 | Canada | WC | 1st place, gold medalist(s) | 8 | 8 | 0 | 0 | 480 | 12 | 2 | 1.50 | .932 |
| Senior totals | | | | 12 | 10 | 2 | 0 | 735 | 19 | 3 | 1.55 | .936 |

== Awards and honours ==
=== AHL ===
| Award | Year |
|---|---|
| AHL Goaltender of the Month | April 2006 |

=== NHL ===
| Award | Year(s) |
|---|---|
| NHL All-Rookie Team | 2007 |
| NHL All-Star Game | 2017, 2018 |

=== International ===
| Award | Year |
|---|---|
| World Championship Top 3 Player on Team | 2015 |
