= Zenon Konopka =

Canadian ice hockey player (born 1981)

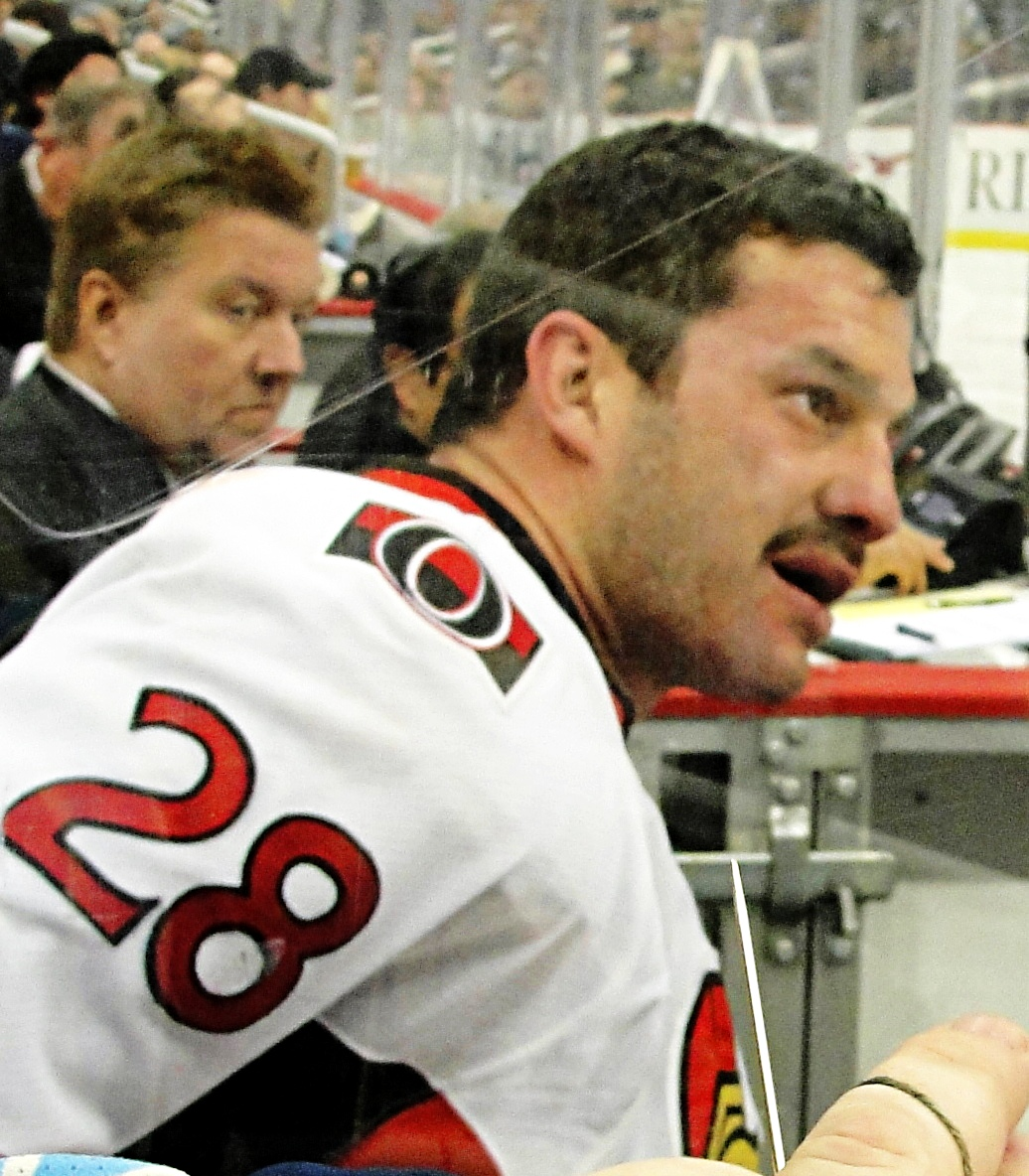
- Konopka with the Ottawa Senators in 2011
- Born: January 2, 1981 (age 45) Niagara-on-the-Lake, Ontario, Canada
- Height: 6 ft 0 in (183 cm)
- Weight: 213 lb (97 kg; 15 st 3 lb)
- Position: Centre
- Shot: Left
- Played for: Mighty Ducks of Anaheim; Columbus Blue Jackets; Tampa Bay Lightning; New York Islanders; Ottawa Senators; Minnesota Wild; Buffalo Sabres; KH Sanok
- NHL draft: Undrafted
- Playing career: 2002–2015
- Website: ZenonKonopka.com

Zenon Konopka (born January 2, 1981) is a Polish-Canadian former professional ice hockey player. Also known as "Zenon the Destroyer", Konopka played for the Mighty Ducks of Anaheim, Columbus Blue Jackets, Tampa Bay Lightning, New York Islanders, Ottawa Senators, Minnesota Wild, and Buffalo Sabres during his National Hockey League (NHL) career. Throughout his career, he was known as an enforcer.

== Playing career ==
As a youth, Konopka played in the 1995 Quebec International Pee-Wee Hockey Tournament with a minor ice hockey team from Niagara Falls, Ontario.

Konopka played junior hockey with the Ottawa 67's of the OHL from 1998 to 2002, and was a member of the 1999 Memorial Cup champions. He was not drafted by an NHL team and caught on with the Wheeling Nailers of the ECHL.

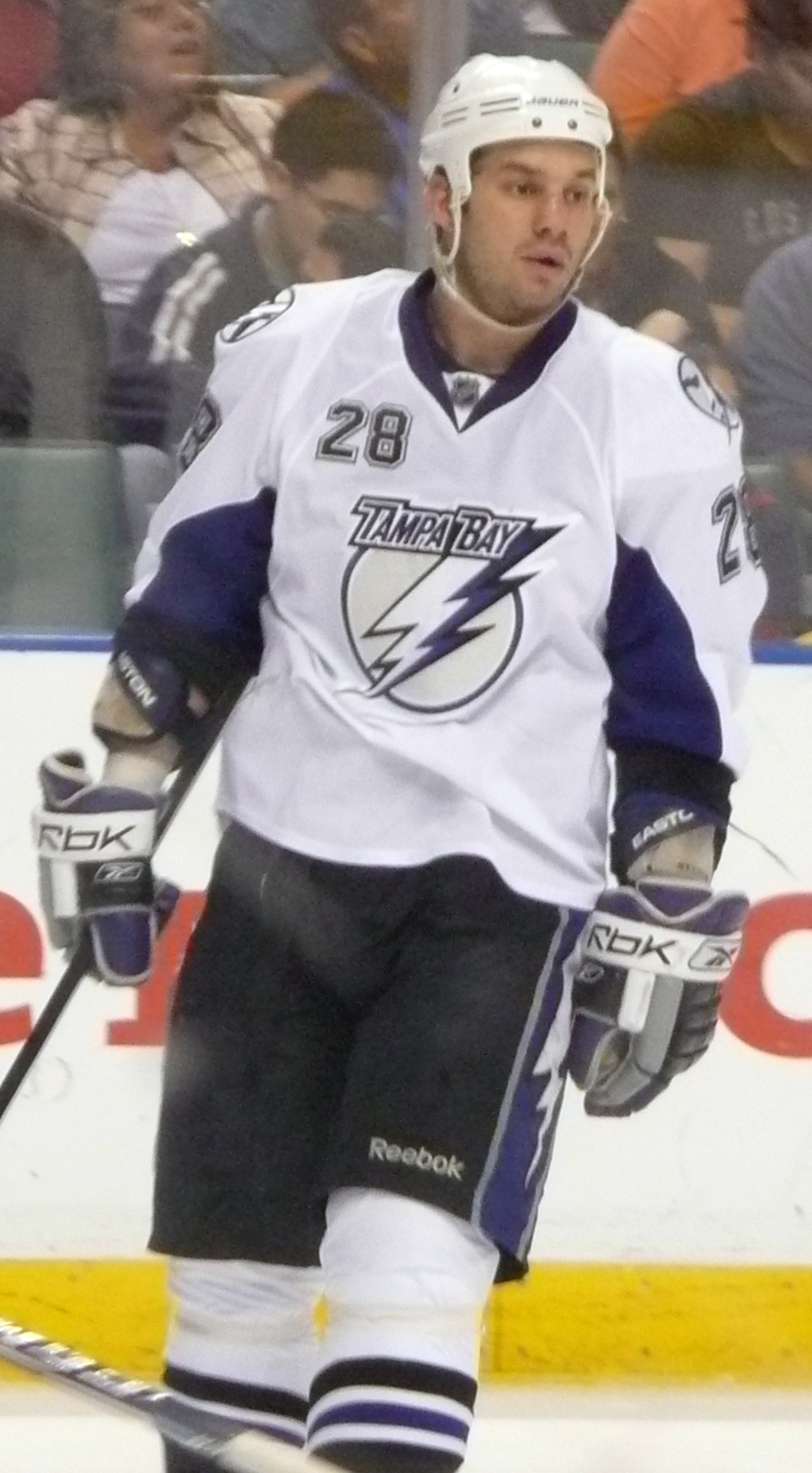
Konopka during his tenure with the Lightning in 2010.

After three minor league seasons with various teams in the ECHL and AHL, Konopka made his NHL debut in 2005–2006, playing 23 games for the Mighty Ducks of Anaheim. After the Ducks were eliminated, he returned to Portland in the AHL, where he led all playoff scorers in power play goals and assists. In 2006–07, he returned to the minors, playing for Portland in the AHL. On January 26, 2007, he was traded by the Anaheim Ducks along with Curtis Glencross and a draft pick to the Blue Jackets in exchange for forwards Mark Hartigan, Joe Motzko and a draft pick. He played for Columbus's farm team in the AHL, the Syracuse Crunch, with occasional call-ups to the Blue Jackets.

On July 10, 2008, Konopka signed a two-year contract with the Tampa Bay Lightning as a free agent. In 2009, after a strong training camp, Konopka made the Lightning's roster out of training camp. On July 2, 2010, he signed with the New York Islanders as an unrestricted free agent. Konopka was the most penalized player in the 2009–10 and 2010–11 NHL seasons.

On July 5, 2011, Konopka signed a one-year contract with the Ottawa Senators. During the 2012 Stanley Cup playoffs, Konopka directed verbal abuse towards a New York Rangers player during a live television interview. Konopka was fined $2,500 by the NHL.

On July 1, 2012, Konopka signed a two-year, $1.85-million contract with the Minnesota Wild. He reportedly had three offers on the table before accepting the deal with Minnesota.

On January 3, 2014, Konopka was claimed off waivers by the Buffalo Sabres, with whom he remained until the end of the season. On May 15, 2014, Konopka was suspended for 20 games following violation of the NHL/NHLPA Performance Enhancing Substances Program after taking dehydroepiandrosterone on a doctor's suggestion. His contract with the Sabres expired July 1, during the suspension, which meant that the term of the suspension was to be served at the beginning of any new contract.

On January 30, 2015, Konopka signed with Ciarko PBS Bank KH Sanok of the PHL in Poland. As of June 2015, he was on tour with other professional journeymen hockey players in Australia. He planned on returning to North America after the tour ended in the hopes of returning to the NHL or, if unable to do that, an American minor league.

On April 1, 2017, Konopka officially retired from hockey when he signed a one-day contract with the Syracuse Crunch to close out his career. Konopka had previously served as Syracuse's captain, and is considered one of the more popular players in team history. Before the game a ceremony featured a video from his former teammates, and the presentation of a lifetime key to the Crowne Plaza Syracuse.

According to quanthockey, Konopka has the second best face-off win percentage in history, behind only Yanic Perreault.

== Personal ==
Konopka is also an entrepreneur and owner of Prime Wine Products, and partners with local charities to help children's programs. Konopka also owns and operates Konopka Co-Packing, a packaging company that employs over 20 workers. He was once part-owner in an Ottawa bar-restaurant called "Stout Bros." and has run the "Zenon Konopka Hockey Academy" in Ottawa since 2007.

Konopka also has a black pet rabbit, Hoppy, and maintains an Instagram and a Twitter account for his pet, who has relocated with him since 2006. Konopka told Fox Sports North that he never wanted a rabbit as a child, but a friend suggested one as Konopka is allergic to cats and dogs. "I can't help that I fell in love with the little guy ... the guy's pretty cool. He just chills around, has his litter box, does his business there and he's pretty soothing to come home to." Konopka also has a specially made hockey jersey made for Hoppy for each team he plays for.

Konopka is of Polish descent. His father was born in Poland. His mother is a native of Buffalo, New York. Konopka's sister, Cynthia, sang the national anthems at Scotiabank Place before the Senators' game on January 16, 2012.

== Career statistics ==
Bold indicates led league

| | | | Regular season | | | | | Playoffs |
| Season | Team | League | GP | G | A | Pts | PIM | GP | G | A | Pts | PIM |
|---|---|---|---|---|---|---|---|---|---|---|---|---|
| 1997–98 | Thorold Blackhawks | GHL | 46 | 6 | 28 | 34 | 139 | — | — | — | — | — |
| 1998–99 | Ottawa 67's | OHL | 56 | 7 | 8 | 15 | 62 | 7 | 0 | 0 | 0 | 2 |
| 1999–00 | Ottawa 67's | OHL | 59 | 8 | 11 | 19 | 107 | 11 | 1 | 2 | 3 | 8 |
| 2000–01 | Ottawa 67's | OHL | 66 | 20 | 45 | 65 | 120 | 20 | 7 | 13 | 20 | 47 |
| 2001–02 | Ottawa 67's | OHL | 61 | 18 | 68 | 86 | 100 | 13 | 8 | 6 | 14 | 49 |
| 2002–03 | Wheeling Nailers | ECHL | 68 | 22 | 48 | 70 | 231 | — | — | — | — | — |
| 2002–03 | Wilkes-Barre/Scranton Penguins | AHL | 4 | 0 | 1 | 1 | 9 | — | — | — | — | — |
| 2003–04 | Idaho Steelheads | ECHL | 23 | 6 | 22 | 28 | 82 | 17 | 9 | 8 | 17 | 30 |
| 2003–04 | Utah Grizzlies | AHL | 43 | 7 | 4 | 11 | 198 | — | — | — | — | — |
| 2004–05 | Cincinnati Mighty Ducks | AHL | 75 | 17 | 29 | 46 | 212 | 12 | 3 | 3 | 6 | 26 |
| 2005–06 | Portland Pirates | AHL | 34 | 18 | 26 | 44 | 57 | 19 | 11 | 18 | 29 | 46 |
| 2005–06 | Mighty Ducks of Anaheim | NHL | 23 | 4 | 3 | 7 | 48 | — | — | — | — | — |
| 2006–07 | Lada Tolyatti | RSL | 4 | 0 | 0 | 0 | 8 | — | — | — | — | — |
| 2006–07 | Portland Pirates | AHL | 42 | 11 | 24 | 35 | 97 | — | — | — | — | — |
| 2006–07 | Syracuse Crunch | AHL | 20 | 9 | 11 | 20 | 70 | — | — | — | — | — |
| 2006–07 | Columbus Blue Jackets | NHL | 6 | 0 | 0 | 0 | 20 | — | — | — | — | — |
| 2007–08 | Syracuse Crunch | AHL | 62 | 24 | 31 | 55 | 194 | 13 | 3 | 7 | 10 | 42 |
| 2007–08 | Columbus Blue Jackets | NHL | 3 | 0 | 0 | 0 | 15 | — | — | — | — | — |
| 2008–09 | Norfolk Admirals | AHL | 70 | 17 | 40 | 57 | 186 | — | — | — | — | — |
| 2008–09 | Tampa Bay Lightning | NHL | 7 | 0 | 1 | 1 | 29 | — | — | — | — | — |
| 2009–10 | Tampa Bay Lightning | NHL | 74 | 2 | 3 | 5 | **265** | — | — | — | — | — |
| 2010–11 | New York Islanders | NHL | 82 | 2 | 7 | 9 | **307** | — | — | — | — | — |
| 2011–12 | Ottawa Senators | NHL | 55 | 3 | 2 | 5 | 193 | 6 | 0 | 2 | 2 | 2 |
| 2012–13 | Minnesota Wild | NHL | 37 | 0 | 0 | 0 | 117 | 2 | 0 | 0 | 0 | 0 |
| 2013–14 | Minnesota Wild | NHL | 36 | 1 | 1 | 2 | 55 | — | — | — | — | — |
| 2013–14 | Buffalo Sabres | NHL | 23 | 0 | 1 | 1 | 33 | — | — | — | — | — |
| 2014–15 | KH Sanok | PHL | 3 | 1 | 0 | 1 | 4 | 8 | 2 | 0 | 2 | 35 |
| NHL totals | | | 346 | 12 | 18 | 30 | 1082 | 8 | 0 | 2 | 2 | 2 |
