= Dale Weise =

Canadian ice hockey player (born 1988)

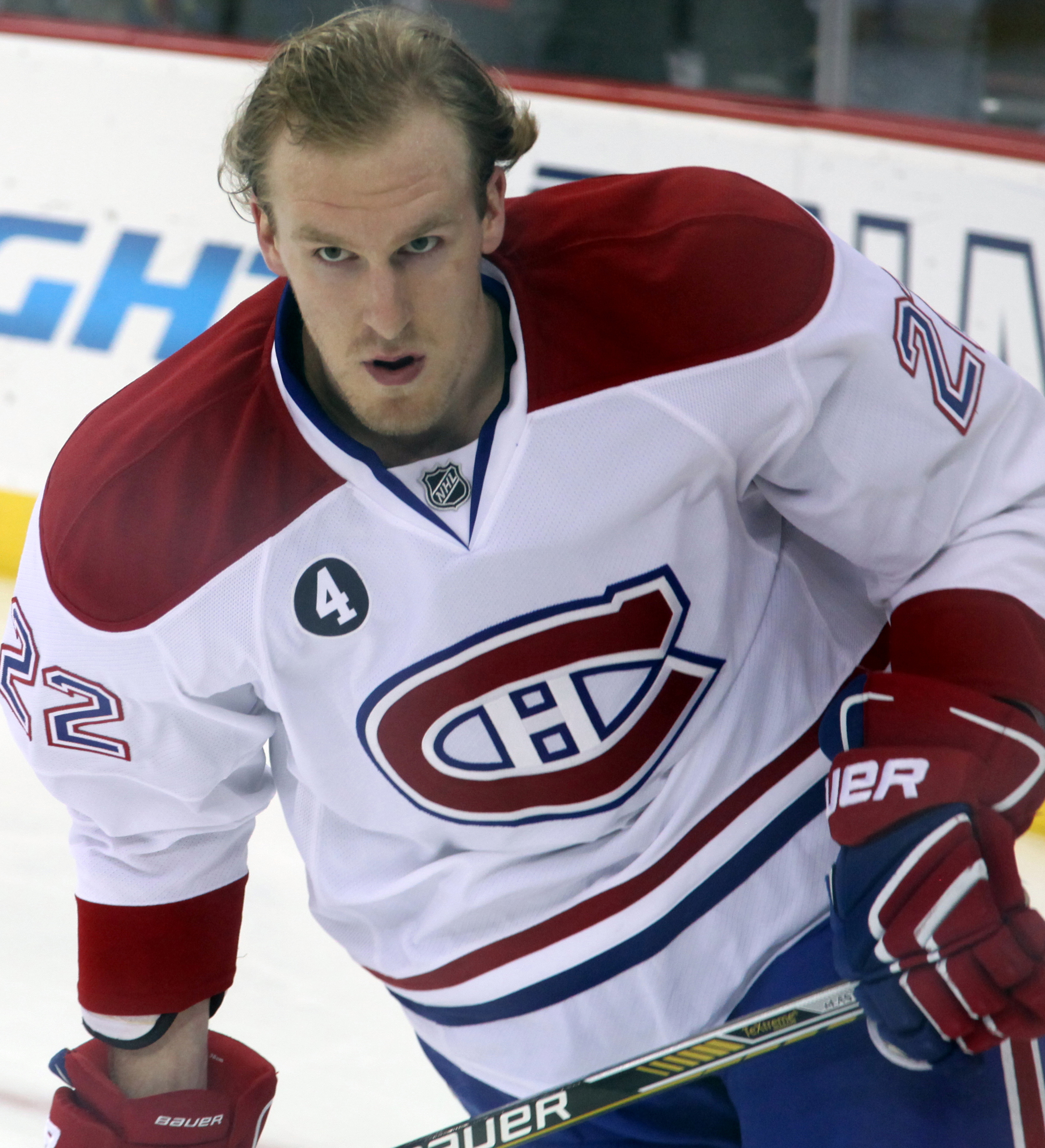
- Weise with the Montreal Canadiens in January 2015
- Born: August 5, 1988 (age 38) Winnipeg, Manitoba, Canada
- Height: 6 ft 2 in (188 cm)
- Weight: 206 lb (93 kg; 14 st 10 lb)
- Position: Right wing
- Shot: Right
- Played for: New York Rangers; Vancouver Canucks; Tilburg Trappers; Montreal Canadiens; Chicago Blackhawks; Philadelphia Flyers; IK Oskarshamn
- NHL draft: 111th overall, 2008; New York Rangers
- Playing career: 2008–2022

Dale Kenton Weise (born August 5, 1988) is a Canadian former professional ice hockey right winger. He was selected in the fourth round, 111th overall, by the New York Rangers of the National Hockey League (NHL) in the 2008 NHL entry draft. Weise also played for the Vancouver Canucks, Montreal Canadiens, Chicago Blackhawks, and Philadelphia Flyers.

== Playing career ==
=== Junior ===
Weise played three years of major junior ice hockey for the Swift Current Broncos of the Western Hockey League (WHL). During his rookie WHL season in 2005–06, he scored 18 points (four goals and 14 assists) over 53 games. He dressed in an addition four playoff games without recording a point as the Broncos were eliminated by the Medicine Hat Tigers. The following season, Weise improved to 43 points (18 goals and 25 assists) over 67 games, ranking second in team scoring, behind centre Levi Nelson. He then recorded one assist in six playoff games as the Broncos were eliminated in the first round for the second consecutive year, this time by the Regina Pats.

Weise played his last season with the Broncos in 2007–08 and recorded a WHL career-high 51 points (29 goals and 22 assists) over 53 games, ranking fifth in team scoring. He missed time due to injury, but returned to the Broncos' line-up near the end of the season. Swift Current advanced past the first round that playoff year, before being eliminated by the Calgary Hitmen in the second round. Weise had a team-leading seven goals in 12 games that post-season (tied with Nelson, while his 13 points ranked second to Nelson. Over three years in the WHL, Weise earned a reputation as a physical power forward; he was also responsible defensively, earning time on the Broncos' penalty kill.

=== Professional ===
==== New York Rangers ====
During the off-season, Weise was selected by the New York Rangers in the fourth round, 111th overall, of the 2008 NHL entry draft. Several months later, while attending his first NHL training camp, he signed an entry-level contract with the team on September 19, 2008. The following week, he was assigned to the Rangers' American Hockey League (AHL) affiliate, the Hartford Wolf Pack and made his professional debut on October 11, 2008, against the Springfield Falcons. He scored his first professional and AHL goal later that month on October 22 against the Worcester Sharks. Playing the entire 2008–09 season with Hartford, he scored 23 points (11 goals and 12 assists) over 74 games, ranking second among team rookies to Bobby Sanguinetti's 42 points. Near the end of the regular season, Weise was named the Wolf Pack's American Specialty/AHL Man of the Year for his community service contributions in the Hartford, Connecticut, area. The honour made him a nominee for the League's Yanick Dupre Memorial Award for community service, which went to Brandon Rogers of the Houston Aeros. During the 2009 playoffs, he added four points (three goals and an assist) over six games, while the Wolf Pack were defeated in the first round by Worcester.

Attending his second Rangers training camp in September 2009, Weise was once again assigned to the Wolf Pack for the start of the 2009–10 season. Midway through the season, he was named AHL Player of the Week after scoring five goals over four games from January 3–10, 2010. He finished the season improving to 50 points (28 goals and 22 assists) over 73 games, ranking fourth in team scoring. His five short-handed goals tied for the League lead with Derek MacKenzie, Steve Pinizzotto and Josh Hennessy. Late in the season, he received his first NHL call-up on April 4, 2010. While Weise remained with the Rangers until the end of the NHL season, he did not dress in any games for them.

Weise began the 2010–11 season in the AHL once more for the Connecticut Whale, who had changed their name from the Hartford Wolf Pack over the summer. Early in the campaign, Weise was sidelined with an injury and missed 18 games. After returning to the line-up, he was recalled by the Rangers on December 17, 2010. He made his NHL debut the following night in a 4–1 loss against the Philadelphia Flyers. Playing six minutes and 43 seconds on the fourth line, Weise nearly scored on two occasions. The first came in the second period when his shot went between Flyers goaltender Brian Boucher's pads but rolled wide of the post. Then, five minutes into the third period, he appeared to have scored when a puck went off his skate and into the Flyers net, but the goal was disallowed after it was ruled that Weise had made an illegal kicking motion with his skate. Later in the game, he fought Flyers enforcer Daniel Carcillo. He was returned to the AHL after the game, but received another stint with the Rangers from January 1 to 22, 2011, after another call-up. Weise finished the 2010–11 season with 38 points (18 goals and 20 assists) over 47 AHL games and no points in ten NHL games.

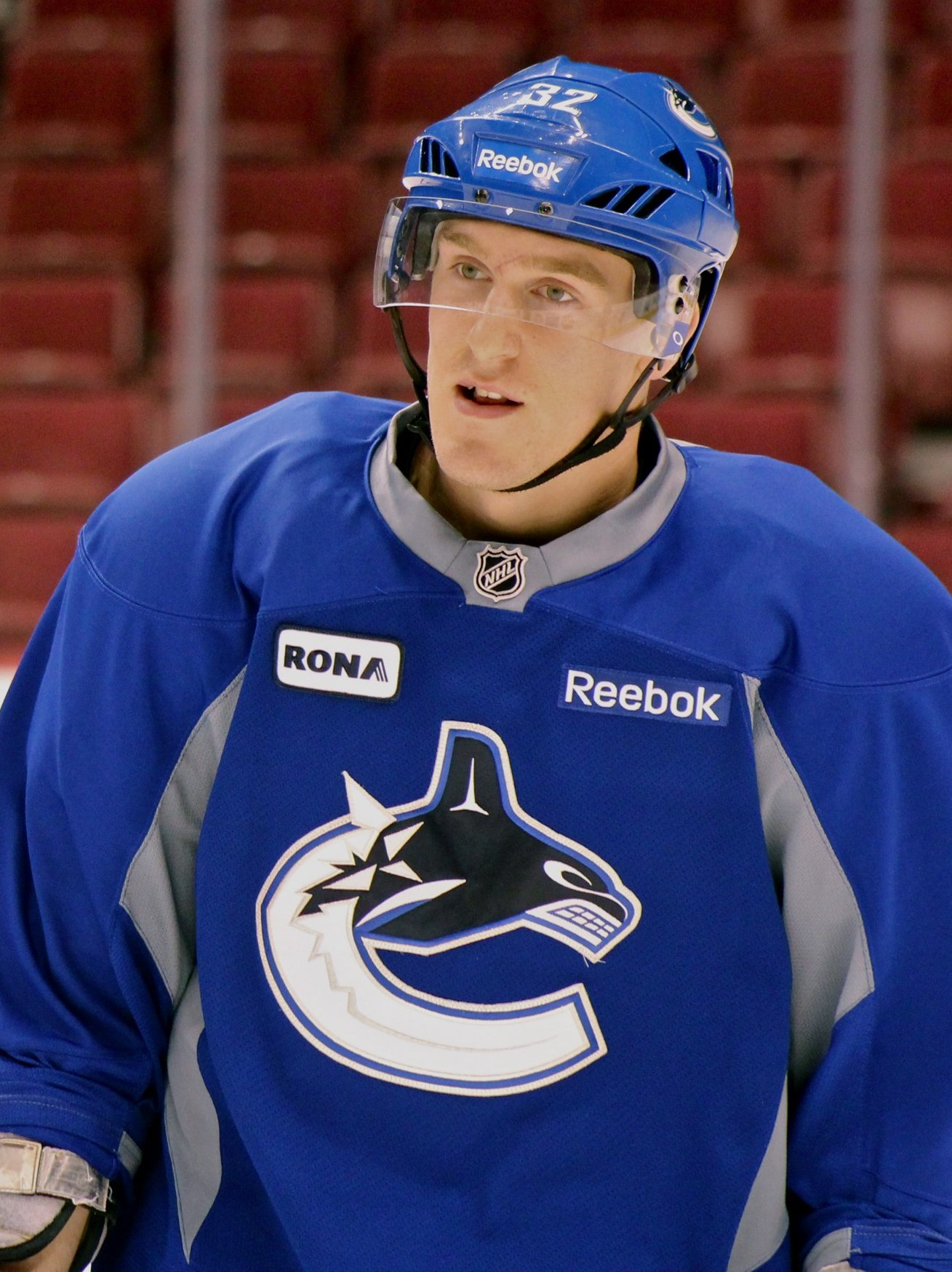
Weise practising with the Vancouver Canucks in March 2012

During the off-season, Weise was re-signed to a one-year, two-way contract on June 27, 2011. The deal was worth $605,000 in the NHL and $85,000 in the minors.

==== Vancouver Canucks ====
While competing for a roster spot at the Rangers' training camp, he was waived by the team on October 4, 2011. He was then claimed by the Vancouver Canucks, who showed interest in acquiring Weise the previous season, and joined the team for the season-opener. Weise scored his first NHL goal in his seventh game with the Canucks (17th NHL game overall) on October 20, 2011, tipping an Alexander Edler shot past goaltender Pekka Rinne in a 5–1 win against the Nashville Predators. Weise's place on the Canucks' roster helped stabilize the team's fourth line, which had gone through 14 different players the previous year.

During the 2012–13 NHL lock-out, Weise played in the Eredivisie, the top level of hockey in the Netherlands. Weise was the only NHL player to appear in the Eredivise and his 22 goals and 48 points in 19 games for the Tillburg Trappers before the NHL season resumed earned him the nickname "Dutch Gretzky".

On January 18, 2014 Weise was involved in an infamous line brawl that had him square off against Calgary Flames forward Blair Jones, one of several fights to break out. A total of 152 penalty minutes were issued and Canucks coach John Tortorella confronted Flames coach Bob Hartley about it in the intermission.

==== Montreal Canadiens ====
Weise was traded by the Canucks to the Montreal Canadiens on February 3, 2014, in exchange for Raphael Diaz. During overtime in Game 1 in the first round of the 2014 Stanley Cup playoffs against the Tampa Bay Lightning, Weise would notably score the game-winner on a one-timer from Daniel Brière, winning the game for the Canadiens, 5–4.

On June 17, 2014, the Canadiens came to terms with Weise on a two-year contract extension.

On October 30, 2015, Weise recorded his first career NHL hat-trick against the Calgary Flames in a 6–2 victory.

==== Chicago Blackhawks ====
On February 26, 2016, with the club on the outside of playoff contention, Weise was traded to the Chicago Blackhawks along with teammate Tomas Fleischmann in exchange for a 2018 second round draft pick and Phillip Danault. He recorded a mere one assist in 15 games for the club to close out the regular season. In four postseason contests, Weise scored one goal.

==== Philadelphia Flyers ====
On July 1, 2016, Weise signed a four-year, $9.4 million contract with the Philadelphia Flyers. In his first season with the club, he recorded eight goals and 15 points in 64 games. On April 13, 2017, Weise underwent surgery for bone spurs in his elbow.

Weise played in his 400th career NHL game on October 19, 2017, in a loss to the Nashville Predators. During the 2017–18 season, Weise was frequently a healthy scratch. He skated 46 games, scoring eight points.

In the 2018–19 season, on January 27, 2019, despite contributing with 11 points in 42 games, the Flyers placed Weise on waivers and assigned him to their American Hockey League affiliate, the Lehigh Valley Phantoms.

==== Return to Montreal Canadiens ====
On February 9, 2019, Weise returned to the Canadiens' organization when he and Christian Folin were traded in exchange for David Schlemko and Byron Froese. He was immediately assigned to the team's American League affiliate, the Laval Rocket. Two days later, on February 11, 2019, Weise was recalled to the Canadiens when a roster spot was made available after Kenny Agostino was claimed off waivers by the New Jersey Devils.

On May 31, 2021, Weise signed with Swedish club IK Oskarshamn.

== Personal life ==
Weise is married to Lauren Raban, and the couple have four children together.

== Career statistics ==
			Regular season					Playoffs
Season	Team	League	GP	G	A	Pts	PIM	GP	G	A	Pts	PIM
2005–06	Swift Current Broncos	WHL	53	4	14	18	57	4	0	0	0	2
2006–07	Swift Current Broncos	WHL	67	18	25	43	94	6	0	1	1	8
2007–08	Swift Current Broncos	WHL	53	29	22	51	84	12	7	6	13	20
2008–09	Hartford Wolf Pack	AHL	74	11	12	23	64	6	3	1	4	2
2009–10	Hartford Wolf Pack	AHL	73	28	22	50	114	—	—	—	—	—
2010–11	Hartford Wolf Pack/CT Whale	AHL	47	18	20	38	73	5	2	1	3	8
2010–11	New York Rangers	NHL	10	0	0	0	19	—	—	—	—	—
2011–12	Vancouver Canucks	NHL	68	4	4	8	81	2	0	0	0	0
2012–13	Tilburg Trappers	NLD	19	22	26	48	79	—	—	—	—	—
2012–13	Vancouver Canucks	NHL	40	3	3	6	43	4	0	0	0	4
2013–14	Vancouver Canucks	NHL	44	3	9	12	42	—	—	—	—	—
2013–14	Montreal Canadiens	NHL	17	3	1	4	4	16	3	4	7	4
2014–15	Montreal Canadiens	NHL	79	10	19	29	34	12	2	1	3	16
2015–16	Montreal Canadiens	NHL	56	14	12	26	22	—	—	—	—	—
2015–16	Chicago Blackhawks	NHL	15	0	1	1	2	4	1	0	1	0
2016–17	Philadelphia Flyers	NHL	64	8	7	15	39	—	—	—	—	—
2017–18	Philadelphia Flyers	NHL	46	4	4	8	21	2	0	0	0	0
2018–19	Philadelphia Flyers	NHL	42	5	6	11	15	—	—	—	—	—
2018–19	Lehigh Valley Phantoms	AHL	3	1	1	2	2	—	—	—	—	—
2018–19	Laval Rocket	AHL	3	2	0	2	0	—	—	—	—	—
2018–19	Montreal Canadiens	NHL	9	0	0	0	4	—	—	—	—	—
2019–20	Laval Rocket	AHL	27	3	4	7	14	—	—	—	—	—
2019–20	Montreal Canadiens	NHL	23	1	4	5	16	5	0	0	0	2
2021–22	Oskarshamn IK	SHL	17	2	1	3	10	—	—	—	—	—
NHL totals			513	55	70	125	355	45	6	5	11	26

== Awards ==
- Hartford Wolf Pack's Man of the Year Award – 2008–09
- AHL Player of the Week – January 3–10, 2010
- Jaques Beauchamp-Molson Trophy (unsung hero) – 2014–15
