= 2014 Stanley Cup playoffs =

Sports competition

Tournament details
- Dates: April 16 – June 13, 2014
- Teams: 16
- Defending champions: Chicago Blackhawks

Final positions
- Champions: Los Angeles Kings
- Runners-up: New York Rangers

Tournament statistics
- Scoring leader(s): Anze Kopitar (Kings) (26 points)

Awards
- MVP: Justin Williams (Kings)

The 2014 Stanley Cup playoffs was the playoff tournament of the National Hockey League (NHL) for the 2013–14 season. They began on April 16, 2014, and ended June 13, 2014, when the Los Angeles Kings defeated the New York Rangers four games to one in the Stanley Cup Final. Prior to the season, the league realigned its teams into four divisions (two in each conference), and adopted a new modified divisional-based playoff structure: the top three teams in each division qualified for the playoffs, along with two wild cards in each conference.

The Boston Bruins made the playoffs as Presidents' Trophy winners with the most points (i.e. best record) during the regular season. The Detroit Red Wings increased their consecutive playoff appearance streak to 23 seasons, the longest streak at the time and the fifth-longest streak in NHL history. The Dallas Stars ended the league's third longest active playoff appearance drought, qualifying for the postseason for the first time in six years. For the first time since 1973, only one Canadian team qualified for the playoffs: the Montreal Canadiens. This was also the first time since the 1978 Stanley Cup playoffs that no playoff games were played in Western Canada. For the third time in four years, all three California-based teams again made the playoffs. The Columbus Blue Jackets won their first franchise playoff game on April 19, 2014, and their first-ever franchise playoff home game at Nationwide Arena on April 23, 2014, both against the Pittsburgh Penguins. Three Original Six teams reached the conference finals, the first time this had occurred since 1979.

The first round featured leads changing hands more so than any previous year. After the Anaheim Ducks rallied from a 4–2 deficit to defeat the Dallas Stars in game six of their first-round series on April 27, 2014, an NHL record was broken for most multi-goal comebacks by all teams in the opening round, with ten. In all four rounds combined in the previous year's playoffs, there were only eight such victories. The San Jose Sharks became the fourth team in Stanley Cup playoff history to lose a series after holding a 3–0 lead; as the Los Angeles Kings came back to win the series in game seven of the first round on April 30, 2014.

On May 29, 2014, the Rangers became the first team ever to advance past the conference finals after playing two seven-game series in the opening two rounds. The Rangers also became the first captainless team to reach the finals since the Chicago Black Hawks in 1973. That same seven-game mark was eclipsed on June 1, 2014, as the Kings became the first team ever to reach the Stanley Cup Final after having played three consecutive seven-game series. Los Angeles played all three of their game sevens on the road. Game five of the Stanley Cup Final marked the 93rd game of the 2014 playoffs, eclipsing the previous single-year record 92 established in 1991; this remains the record for the most games played using a sixteen team playoff format. The record for most games played in a single year was broken during the expanded 2020 Stanley Cup playoffs.

The Kings tied the 1986–87 Philadelphia Flyers and the 2003–04 Calgary Flames, for most games played (26) in one playoff year under a sixteen team playoff format (later matched by the 2014–15 Tampa Bay Lightning and 2018–19 St. Louis Blues). The record was subsequently broken by the 2019–20 Dallas Stars during the expanded 2020 playoffs.

== Playoff seeds ==
The NHL adopted a new league alignment for the 2013–14 season, as the Detroit Red Wings and Columbus Blue Jackets were moved to the Eastern Conference and the Winnipeg Jets to the Western Conference. The 16-team Eastern Conference was then divided into two 8-team divisions (Metropolitan and Atlantic), while the 14-team Western Conference was divided into two 7-team divisions (Pacific and Central). As part of the realignment, the NHL also switched its former conference-based playoff structure to a divisional-based playoff structure. The top three teams from each division qualified for that conference's playoffs. The remaining two playoff spots in each conference were wild card teams, which were the top two clubs from each conference that failed to win a divisional playoff spot.

The following teams qualified for the playoffs:

=== Eastern Conference ===
==== Atlantic Division ====
1. Boston Bruins, Atlantic Division champions, Eastern Conference regular season champions, Presidents' Trophy winners – 117 points
2. Tampa Bay Lightning – 101 points
3. Montreal Canadiens – 100 points

==== Metropolitan Division ====
1. Pittsburgh Penguins, Metropolitan Division champions – 109 points
2. New York Rangers – 96 points
3. Philadelphia Flyers – 94 points

==== Wild cards ====
1. Columbus Blue Jackets – 93 points (38 ROWs)
2. Detroit Red Wings – 93 points (34 ROWs)

=== Western Conference ===
==== Central Division ====
1. Colorado Avalanche, Central Division champions – 112 points
2. St. Louis Blues – 111 points
3. Chicago Blackhawks – 107 points

==== Pacific Division ====
1. Anaheim Ducks, Pacific Division champions, Western Conference regular season champions – 116 points
2. San Jose Sharks – 111 points
3. Los Angeles Kings – 100 points

==== Wild cards ====
1. Minnesota Wild – 98 points
2. Dallas Stars – 91 points

== Playoff bracket ==
In each round, teams competed in a best-of-seven series following a 2–2–1–1–1 format (scores in the bracket indicate the number of games won in each best-of-seven series). The team with home-ice advantage played at home for games one and two (and games five and seven, if necessary), and the other team was at home for games three and four (and game six, if necessary). The top three teams in each division made the playoffs, along with two wild cards in each conference, for a total of eight teams from each conference.

In the first round, the lower-seeded wild card in the conference played against the division winner with the best record while the other wild card played against the other division winner, and both wild cards were de facto #4 seeds. The other two teams from each division played each other in the other series, with the second-placed team having home-ice advantage. In the first two rounds, home-ice advantage was awarded to the team with the higher seed; in the last two rounds, it was awarded to the team with the better regular season record. Beginning in 2013–14, the NHL officially changed the names of the first two rounds of the playoffs from Conference quarterfinals/semifinals to First/Second round.

First round	Second round
A1	Boston	4
WC2	Detroit	1
A1	Boston	3
A3	Montreal	4
A2	Tampa Bay	0
A3	Montreal	4
Eastern Conference
M1	Pittsburgh	4
WC1	Columbus	2
M1	Pittsburgh	3
M2	NY Rangers	4
M2	NY Rangers	4
M3	Philadelphia	3
C1	Colorado	3
WC1	Minnesota	4
WC1	Minnesota	2
C3	Chicago	4
C2	St. Louis	2
C3	Chicago	4
Western Conference
P1	Anaheim	4
WC2	Dallas	2
P1	Anaheim	3
P3	Los Angeles	4
P2	San Jose	3
P3	Los Angeles	4

Conference finals
A3	Montreal	2
M2	NY Rangers	4
C3	Chicago	3
P3	Los Angeles	4

Stanley Cup Final
M2	NY Rangers	1
P3	Los Angeles	4

Legend

- A1, A2, A3 – The first, second, and third place teams from the Atlantic Division, respectively
- M1, M2, M3 – The first, second, and third place teams from the Metropolitan Division, respectively
- C1, C2, C3 – The first, second, and third place teams from the Central Division, respectively
- P1, P2, P3 – The first, second, and third place teams from the Pacific Division, respectively
- WC1, WC2 – The first and second place teams in the Wild Card, respectively

== First round ==
=== Eastern Conference first round ===
==== (A1) Boston Bruins vs. (WC2) Detroit Red Wings ====
The Boston Bruins won the Presidents' Trophy earning the league's best record, with 117 points. The Detroit Red Wings earned 93 points during the regular season, losing the tiebreaker to Columbus in regulation + overtime wins (38 to 34), and entered the playoffs as the Eastern Conference's second wild card. This was the eighth playoff meeting for these Original Six teams, with Boston having won four of the seven previous series. They last met in the 1957 Stanley Cup semifinals, which Boston won in five games. The Red Wings won three of the four games in this year's regular season series.

The Bruins eliminated the Red Wings in five games. In game one, Pavel Datsyuk scored the only goal with 3:01 left in Detroit's 1–0 victory, but Boston went on to win four straight contests to capture the series. Four different Bruins players scored goals in Boston's 4–1 win in game two. Bruins goalie Tuukka Rask then stopped all 23 Detroit shots in a 3–0 victory in game three. In game four, Boston overcame a two-goal, second-period deficit, scoring three unanswered goals – including Jarome Iginla's game-winner at 13:32 of overtime to win 3–2. The Bruins clinched the series with a 4–2 win in game five, as Torey Krug recorded two assists, and Rask made 31 saves on 33 shots.

April 18	Detroit Red Wings	1–0	Boston Bruins	TD Garden	Recap
No scoring		First period	No scoring
No scoring		Second period	No scoring
Pavel Datsyuk (1) – 16:59		Third period	No scoring
Jimmy Howard 25 saves / 25 shots		Goalie stats	Tuukka Rask 23 saves / 24 shots

April 20	Detroit Red Wings	1–4	Boston Bruins	TD Garden	Recap
No scoring		First period	07:28 – Justin Florek (1); 10:35 – pp – Reilly Smith (1)
Luke Glendening (1) – 13:20		Second period	18:16 – Milan Lucic (1)
No scoring		Third period	02:27 – pp – Zdeno Chara (1)
Jimmy Howard 25 saves / 29 shots		Goalie stats	Tuukka Rask 34 saves / 35 shots

April 22	Boston Bruins	3–0	Detroit Red Wings	Joe Louis Arena	Recap
Dougie Hamilton (1) – pp – 09:00; Jordan Caron (1) – 15:48		First period	No scoring
No scoring		Second period	No scoring
Patrice Bergeron (1) – en – 18:01		Third period	No scoring
Tuukka Rask 23 saves / 23 shots		Goalie stats	Jimmy Howard 31 saves / 33 shots

April 24	Boston Bruins	3–2	OT	Detroit Red Wings	Joe Louis Arena	Recap
No scoring		First period		11:00 – pp – Niklas Kronwall (1)
Torey Krug (1) – pp – 10:14		Second period		04:27 – Pavel Datsyuk (2)
Milan Lucic (2) – 01:15		Third period		No scoring
Jarome Iginla (1) – 13:32		First overtime period		No scoring
Tuukka Rask 35 saves / 37 shots		Goalie stats		Jonas Gustavsson 37 saves / 40 shots

April 26	Detroit Red Wings	2–4	Boston Bruins	TD Garden	Recap
No scoring		First period	03:27 – pp – Loui Eriksson (1)
Pavel Datsyuk (3) – pp – 14:41		Second period	19:56 – pp – Zdeno Chara (2)
Henrik Zetterberg (1) – 16:08		Third period	04:27 – Milan Lucic (3); 19:44 – en – Jarome Iginla (2)
Jonas Gustavsson 29 saves / 32 shots		Goalie stats	Tuukka Rask 31 saves / 33 shots

Boston won series 4–1

==== (A2) Tampa Bay Lightning vs. (A3) Montreal Canadiens ====
The Tampa Bay Lightning finished second overall in the Atlantic Division, earning 101 points. The Montreal Canadiens earned 100 points during the regular season, to finish third overall in the Atlantic Division. This was the second playoff meeting for these two teams. Their only previous meeting was in the 2004 Eastern Conference semifinals, in which Tampa Bay swept Montreal out of the playoffs en route to their Stanley Cup victory. The Lightning won three of the four games in this year's regular season series.

The Canadiens swept the Lightning, who were without their starting goalie Ben Bishop after he suffered an injury during the last few weeks of the regular season. With Anders Lindback in the Tampa Bay net, Steven Stamkos of the Lightning scored at 13:27 of the third period to tie game one, 4–4, before Montreal's Dale Weise won it at 18:08 of overtime. Rene Bourque scored two goals, and Carey Price stopped 26 out of 27 shots, in the Canadiens' 4–1 win in game two. At 15:38 of the second period of game three, Tampa Bay's Ryan Callahan appeared to give his team a 2–1 lead, but his goal was waved off as the officials ruled that there was contact between Alex Killorn and Price; Montreal's Brendan Gallagher then scored minutes later, and the Canadiens went on to win 3–2. Max Pacioretty then scored a power-play goal at 19:17 of the third period of game four to give Montreal the 4–3 win and the series.

April 16	Montreal Canadiens	5–4	OT	Tampa Bay Lightning	Tampa Bay Times Forum	Recap
Tomas Plekanec (1) – 10:28		First period		10:09 – Nikita Kucherov (1)
Brian Gionta (1) – sh – 16:39		Second period		13:24 – Steven Stamkos (1)
Lars Eller (1) – 05:10; Thomas Vanek (1) – 11:30		Third period		07:11 – Alexander Killorn (1); 13:27 – Steven Stamkos (2)
Dale Weise (1) – 18:08		First overtime period		No scoring
Carey Price 21 saves / 25 shots		Goalie stats		Anders Lindback 39 saves / 44 shots

April 18	Montreal Canadiens	4–1	Tampa Bay Lightning	Tampa Bay Times Forum	Recap
No scoring		First period	No scoring
David Desharnais (1) – pp – 02:34; Rene Bourque (1) – 10:35		Second period	No scoring
Brendan Gallagher (1) – 11:46; Rene Bourque (2) – 14:39		Third period	18:01 – pp – Teddy Purcell (1)
Carey Price 26 saves / 27 shots		Goalie stats	Anders Lindback 20 saves / 23 shots Kristers Gudlevskis 2 saves / 3 shots

April 20	Tampa Bay Lightning	2–3	Montreal Canadiens	Bell Centre	Recap
No scoring		First period	00:11 – Rene Bourque (3)
Ondrej Palat (1) – pp – 08:39		Second period	18:10 – Brendan Gallagher (2)
Matt Carle (1) – 11:36		Third period	05:43 – Tomas Plekanec (2)
Anders Lindback 28 saves / 31 shots		Goalie stats	Carey Price 27 saves / 29 shots

April 22	Tampa Bay Lightning	3–4	Montreal Canadiens	Bell Centre	Recap
No scoring		First period	02:24 – Daniel Briere (1); 15:21 – Lars Eller (2)
Ondrej Palat (2) – sh – 04:32		Second period	05:42 – Brendan Gallagher (3)
Victor Hedman (1) – 03:29; Tyler Johnson (1) – 06:31		Third period	19:17 – pp – Max Pacioretty (1)
Anders Lindback 17 saves / 20 shots Kristers Gudlevskis 16 saves / 17 shots		Goalie stats	Carey Price 20 saves / 23 shots

Montreal won series 4–0

==== (M1) Pittsburgh Penguins vs. (WC1) Columbus Blue Jackets ====
The Pittsburgh Penguins finished first in the Metropolitan Division, earning 109 points. The Columbus Blue Jackets earned 93 points during the regular season, and entered the playoffs as the Eastern Conference's first wild card, winning the tiebreaker over Detroit in regulation + overtime wins (38 to 34), making the post-season for the first time since 2009, and only the second time in the franchise's history. This was the first playoff meeting for these two teams. The Penguins won all five games in this year's regular season series.

The Blue Jackets recorded their first-ever playoff victories in team history, but the Penguins still managed to win the series in six games. The first five games in the series featured comebacks, including 3–1 leads evaporating into 4–3 losses in the first four games. In game one, Pittsburgh scored three unanswered goals, including Brandon Sutter's game winner 8:18 in the third period, to overcome a two-goal deficit to win, 4–3. Columbus then overcame a two-goal deficit in game two after Pittsburgh built their lead with Brian Gibbons scoring his first two playoff goals, including a short-handed one. Matt Calvert then scored both a short-handed goal and then the game-winner 1:10 into double overtime to give the Blue Jackets their first playoff victory in franchise history. Game three saw Brooks Orpik score his second ever playoff goal with less than two seconds remaining in the second period. The Blue Jackets would jump back up to a two-goal lead at the start of the third period, thanks to Cam Atkinson's first-ever playoff goal. But the Penguins scored three goals in a span of 2:13 in the third period, including Jussi Jokinen's game-winner at 8:06, for another 4–3 win. The Blue Jackets then overcame a three-goal deficit in game four to record a fourth 4–3 contest in this series, with Brandon Dubinsky tying the game with 24 seconds left in regulation after Penguins goaltender Marc-Andre Fleury mishandled the puck from behind his own net, allowing Ryan Johansen to fling the puck to a wide open Dubinsky. Nick Foligno then scored the game-winner at 2:49 into overtime, which gave the Blue Jackets their first home playoff victory in team history. But Fleury rebounded in game five, making 23 saves out of 24 shots in Pittsburgh's 3–1 win. Columbus lost despite spectacular play by Sergei Bobrovsky, who stopped 48 of 50 shots but did not receive the goal support needed to win. In game six, Evgeni Malkin's second career playoff hat trick helped the Penguins build a 4–0 lead, but they had to withstand a late comeback attempt by the Blue Jackets, who scored three unanswered goals in a span of five minutes late in the third period, to hold on to the 4–3 victory.

April 16	Columbus Blue Jackets	3–4	Pittsburgh Penguins	Consol Energy Center	Recap
Jack Johnson (1) – 06:20; Mark Letestu (1) – pp – 17:58		First period	17:13 – Jussi Jokinen (1)
Derek MacKenzie (1) – sh – 00:43		Second period	01:34 – pp – Beau Bennett (1); 02:19 – pp – Matt Niskanen (1)
No scoring		Third period	08:18 – Brandon Sutter (1)
Sergei Bobrovsky 28 saves / 32 shots		Goalie stats	Marc-Andre Fleury 31 saves / 34 shots

April 19	Columbus Blue Jackets	4–3	2OT	Pittsburgh Penguins	Consol Energy Center	Recap
Ryan Johansen (1) – pp – 05:07		First period		03:30 – Brian Gibbons (1); 04:24 – sh – Brian Gibbons (2); 17:52 – pp – Matt Niskanen (2)
Matt Calvert (1) – sh – 07:31		Second period		No scoring
Jack Johnson (2) – pp – 13:59		Third period		No scoring
Matt Calvert (2) – 01:10		Second overtime period		No scoring
Sergei Bobrovsky 39 saves / 42 shots		Goalie stats		Marc-Andre Fleury 41 saves / 45 shots

April 21	Pittsburgh Penguins	4–3	Columbus Blue Jackets	Nationwide Arena	Recap
No scoring		First period	01:38 – Boone Jenner (1); 03:18 – Jack Johnson (3)
Brooks Orpik (1) – 19:58		Second period	No scoring
Brandon Sutter (2) – 05:53; Lee Stempniak (1) – 07:03; Jussi Jokinen (2) – 08:06		Third period	01:04 – Cam Atkinson (1)
Marc-Andre Fleury 17 saves / 20 shots		Goalie stats	Sergei Bobrovsky 37 saves / 41 shots

April 23	Pittsburgh Penguins	3–4	OT	Columbus Blue Jackets	Nationwide Arena	Recap
Craig Adams (1) – sh – 06:09; Chris Kunitz (1) – pp – 10:37; James Neal (1) – 11:10		First period		16:39 – pp – Boone Jenner (2)
No scoring		Second period		14:20 – pp – Ryan Johansen (2)
No scoring		Third period		19:36 – Brandon Dubinsky (1)
No scoring		First overtime period		02:49 – Nick Foligno (1)
Marc-Andre Fleury 42 saves / 46 shots		Goalie stats		Sergei Bobrovsky 22 saves / 25 shots

April 26	Columbus Blue Jackets	1–3	Pittsburgh Penguins	Consol Energy Center	Recap
Boone Jenner (3) – pp – 12:55		First period	No scoring
No scoring		Second period	07:42 – pp – Chris Kunitz (2)
No scoring		Third period	06:16 – Jussi Jokinen (3); 18:59 – en – Kris Letang (1)
Sergei Bobrovsky 48 saves / 50 shots		Goalie stats	Marc-Andre Fleury 23 saves / 24 shots

April 28	Pittsburgh Penguins	4–3	Columbus Blue Jackets	Nationwide Arena	Recap
Evgeni Malkin (1) – 09:11; Evgeni Malkin (2) – pp – 13:13		First period	No scoring
Brandon Sutter (3) – 00:34; Evgeni Malkin (3) – 15:22		Second period	No scoring
No scoring		Third period	10:21 – sh – Fedor Tyutin (1); 13:54 – pp – Artem Anisimov (1); 15:13 – Nick Foligno (2)
Marc-Andre Fleury 24 saves / 27 shots		Goalie stats	Sergei Bobrovsky 24 saves / 28 shots

Pittsburgh won series 4–2

==== (M2) New York Rangers vs. (M3) Philadelphia Flyers ====
The New York Rangers finished second overall in the Metropolitan Division, earning 96 points. The Philadelphia Flyers earned 94 points during the regular season, to finish third overall in the Metropolitan Division. This was the 11th playoff meeting for these rivals, with Philadelphia having won six of the ten previous series. Their most recent meeting was in the 1997 Eastern Conference final, which Philadelphia won in five games. Each team won two games in this year's four-game regular season series.

The Rangers eliminated the Flyers in seven games. New York scored two power play goals, and Brad Richards recorded a goal and two assists, in a 4–1 victory in game one. The Flyers overcame a two-goal deficit, scoring four unanswered goals from four different players to win game two, 4–2. In game three, Daniel Girardi and Martin St. Louis each had a goal and an assist as they led the Rangers to another 4–1 win. Steve Mason then replaced Ray Emery as the starting goalie for the Flyers in game four. Mason went on to make 37 saves out of 38 shots, and Jakub Voracek scored the game-winning goal on a power play in the second period, as Philadelphia won, 2–1. However, Rangers goalie Henrik Lundqvist made 23 saves out of 25 shots en route to a 4–2 Rangers win in game five. Back at home in game six, Wayne Simmonds recorded a hat-trick, leading Philadelphia to a 5–2 win. Game seven was played the next night, where the Rangers jumped to a 2–0 lead in the second period, and with Henrik Lundqvist stopping 26 out of 27 shots, the Rangers hung on for a 2–1 win. The Rangers became the only NHL team to remain undefeated in a home game seven with a 6–0 franchise record.

April 17	Philadelphia Flyers	1–4	New York Rangers	Madison Square Garden	Recap
Andrew MacDonald (1) – 07:28		First period	10:53 – Mats Zuccarello (1)
No scoring		Second period	No scoring
No scoring		Third period	08:22 – pp – Brad Richards (1); 09:09 – pp – Derek Stepan (1); 15:52 – Carl Hagelin (1)
Ray Emery 32 saves / 36 shots		Goalie stats	Henrik Lundqvist 14 saves / 15 shots

April 20	Philadelphia Flyers	4–2	New York Rangers	Madison Square Garden	Recap
Jakub Voracek (1) – 14:14		First period	04:08 – Martin St. Louis (1); 08:22 – pp – Benoit Pouliot (1)
Jason Akeson (1) – pp – 05:45; Luke Schenn (1) – 11:18		Second period	No scoring
Wayne Simmonds (1) – en – 19:34		Third period	No scoring
Ray Emery 31 saves / 33 shots		Goalie stats	Henrik Lundqvist 21 saves / 24 shots

April 22	New York Rangers	4–1	Philadelphia Flyers	Wells Fargo Center	Recap
Derek Stepan (2) – 03:54; Martin St. Louis (2) – 10:24		First period	17:18 – Mark Streit (1)
Daniel Girardi (1) – 05:17		Second period	No scoring
Daniel Carcillo (1) – 10:53		Third period	No scoring
Henrik Lundqvist 31 saves / 32 shots		Goalie stats	Ray Emery 16 saves / 20 shots Steve Mason 3 saves / 3 shots

April 25	New York Rangers	1–2	Philadelphia Flyers	Wells Fargo Center	Recap
Dominic Moore (1) – 04:38		First period	08:55 – Matt Read (1)
No scoring		Second period	07:22 – pp – Jakub Voracek (2)
No scoring		Third period	No scoring
Henrik Lundqvist 23 saves / 25 shots		Goalie stats	Steve Mason 37 saves / 38 shots

April 27	Philadelphia Flyers	2–4	New York Rangers	Madison Square Garden	Recap
No scoring		First period	11:53 – Marc Staal (1)
Vincent Lecavalier (1) – pp – 19:27		Second period	08:07 – Brad Richards (2); 16:20 – Dominic Moore (2)
Claude Giroux (1) – 18:31		Third period	19:45 – en – Brian Boyle (1)
Steve Mason 18 saves / 21 shots		Goalie stats	Henrik Lundqvist 24 saves / 26 shots

April 29	New York Rangers	2–5	Philadelphia Flyers	Wells Fargo Center	Recap
No scoring		First period	07:08 – pp – Wayne Simmonds (2)
No scoring		Second period	01:32 – Wayne Simmonds (3); 14:17 – Erik Gustafsson (1); 15:19 – pp – Wayne Simmonds (4)
Carl Hagelin (2) – 13:26; Mats Zuccarello (2) – 19:03		Third period	15:49 – en – Claude Giroux (2)
Henrik Lundqvist 19 saves / 23 shots Cam Talbot 5 saves / 5 shots		Goalie stats	Steve Mason 34 saves / 36 shots

April 30	Philadelphia Flyers	1–2	New York Rangers	Madison Square Garden	Recap
No scoring		First period	No scoring
No scoring		Second period	03:06 – Daniel Carcillo (2); 11:46 – Benoit Pouliot (2)
Jason Akeson (2) – 04:32		Third period	No scoring
Steve Mason 31 saves / 33 shots		Goalie stats	Henrik Lundqvist 26 saves / 27 shots

New York won series 4–3

=== Western Conference first round ===
==== (C1) Colorado Avalanche vs. (WC1) Minnesota Wild ====
The Colorado Avalanche finished first overall in the Central Division, earning 112 points. The Minnesota Wild earned 98 points during the regular season and entered the playoffs as the Western Conference's first wild card. This was the third playoff meeting for these two teams; the Wild earned a seven-game series victory in the 2003 Western Conference quarterfinals, while the Avalanche earned a six-game series victory in the 2008 Western Conference quarterfinals. The Avalanche won four of the five games in this year's regular season series.

The Wild defeated the Avalanche in seven games. The home team had won the first six games in the series before Minnesota won game seven on the road. Throughout the series, Colorado head coach Patrick Roy used his strategy of pulling goalie Semyon Varlamov for an extra attacker earlier than usual when trailing late in the third period. In game one trailing by a goal, Roy pulled Varlamov with 3:01 remaining in regulation. Paul Stastny then tied the game with 13.4 seconds remaining and then scored the game-winner 7:27 into overtime to give the Avalanche a 5–4 win. Gabriel Landeskog then scored two goals in game two to lead Colorado to a 4–2 victory. In game three, Mikael Granlund scored the only goal 5:08 into overtime in Minnesota's 1–0 victory. The Wild then only allowed 12 Colorado shots in a 2–1 win in game four, even after Roy pulled Varlamov for the extra attacker with less than three minutes left. In game five (after Roy pulled Varlamov with 2:22 left in the third period), Colorado's P. A. Parenteau's game-tying goal with 1:14 remaining was met with controversy as the Avalanche appeared to have been offside on the play, but it was never called. Nathan MacKinnon then scored 3:27 into overtime to give the Avalanche a 4–3 win. Zach Parise scored two goals in game six, including the game-winner 13:31 into the third period that broke a 2–2 tie. This time, Roy's tactic of pulling Varlamov early backfired as the Wild scored two empty net goals to win, 5–2. In game seven, Minnesota's Jared Spurgeon tied the game, 4–4, at 17:33 in the third period, and Nino Niederreiter scored the series-winning goal 5:02 into overtime to give the Wild a 5–4 win.

April 17	Minnesota Wild	4–5	OT	Colorado Avalanche	Pepsi Center	Recap
Charlie Coyle (1) – 15:20		First period		13:14 – Gabriel Landeskog (1)
Ryan Suter (1) – pp – 11:05; Erik Haula (1) – 16:08; Kyle Brodziak (1) – 18:12		Second period		14:12 – Ryan O'Reilly (1)
No scoring		Third period		07:13 – Jamie McGinn (1); 19:46 – Paul Stastny (1)
No scoring		First overtime period		07:27 – Paul Stastny (2)
Ilya Bryzgalov 26 saves / 31 shots		Goalie stats		Semyon Varlamov 29 saves / 33 shots

April 19	Minnesota Wild	2–4	Colorado Avalanche	Pepsi Center	Recap
Charlie Coyle (2) – 04:18		First period	06:20 – Nathan MacKinnon (1)
No scoring		Second period	02:58 – Gabriel Landeskog (2); 11:59 – Gabriel Landeskog (3)
Marco Scandella (1) – sh – 18:41		Third period	19:45 – en – Paul Stastny (3)
Ilya Bryzgalov 11 saves / 14 shots Darcy Kuemper 14 saves / 14 shots		Goalie stats	Semyon Varlamov 30 saves / 32 shots

April 21	Colorado Avalanche	0–1	OT	Minnesota Wild	Xcel Energy Center	Recap
No scoring		First period		No scoring
No scoring		Second period		No scoring
No scoring		Third period		No scoring
No scoring		First overtime period		05:08 – Mikael Granlund (1)
Semyon Varlamov 45 saves / 46 shots		Goalie stats		Darcy Kuemper 22 saves / 22 shots

April 24	Colorado Avalanche	1–2	Minnesota Wild	Xcel Energy Center	Recap
No scoring		First period	03:47 – Jared Spurgeon (1)
Ryan O'Reilly (2) – 13:25		Second period	12:55 – pp – Charlie Coyle (3)
No scoring		Third period	No scoring
Semyon Varlamov 30 saves / 32 shots		Goalie stats	Darcy Kuemper 11 saves / 12 shots

April 26	Minnesota Wild	3–4	OT	Colorado Avalanche	Pepsi Center	Recap
No scoring		First period		No scoring
Matt Moulson (1) – 09:17		Second period		08:04 – sh – Cody McLeod (1); 12:16 – Nick Holden (1)
Zach Parise (1) – 04:34; Kyle Brodziak (2) – 06:25		Third period		18:46 – P. A. Parenteau (1)
No scoring		First overtime period		03:27 – Nathan MacKinnon (2)
Darcy Kuemper 31 saves / 35 shots		Goalie stats		Semyon Varlamov 29 saves / 32 shots

April 28	Colorado Avalanche	2–5	Minnesota Wild	Xcel Energy Center	Recap
Paul Stastny (4) – sh – 16:59		First period	00:49 – pp – Zach Parise (2); 09:35 – Mikael Granlund (2)
Nick Holden (2) – pp – 04:47		Second period	No scoring
No scoring		Third period	13:31 – Zach Parise (3); 18:34 – en – Jason Pominville (1); 19:04 – en – Marco Scandella (2)
Semyon Varlamov 18 saves / 21 shots		Goalie stats	Darcy Kuemper 21 saves / 23 shots

April 30	Minnesota Wild	5–4	OT	Colorado Avalanche	Pepsi Center	Recap
Mikko Koivu (1) – 08:04		First period		02:52 – pp – Nick Holden (3); 13:38 – Jamie McGinn (2)
Dany Heatley (1) – 07:27		Second period		No scoring
Nino Niederreiter (1) – 06:33; Jared Spurgeon (2) – 17:33		Third period		02:55 – Paul Stastny (5); 11:16 – Erik Johnson (1)
Nino Niederreiter (2) – 05:02		First overtime period		No scoring
Darcy Kuemper 17 saves / 21 shots Ilya Bryzgalov 1 save / 1 shot		Goalie stats		Semyon Varlamov 30 saves / 35 shots

Minnesota won series 4–3

==== (C2) St. Louis Blues vs. (C3) Chicago Blackhawks ====
The St. Louis Blues finished second overall in the Central Division, earning 111 points. The Chicago Blackhawks earned 107 points during the regular season, to finish third overall in the Central Division. This was the eleventh playoff meeting between these two teams, with Chicago having won seven of the ten previous series. Their most recent meeting was in the 2002 Western Conference quarterfinals, which St. Louis won in five games. The Blues won three of the five games in this year's regular season series.

This was the second consecutive year in which St. Louis faced the defending Stanley Cup champions in the first round. Much like last year, the Blues would win the first two games at Scottrade Center, but then go on to lose the next four games. In game one, the Blues' Jaden Schwartz scored his first career playoff goal with 1:45 left in regulation to tie the score at 3–3, then Alexander Steen won it at 26 seconds into triple-overtime. In game two, the Blackhawks held a 3–2 lead in the third period, but with less than 5 minutes left in regulation Chicago's Brent Seabrook was called for a five-minute major penalty and a game misconduct (and later given a three-game suspension) for charging David Backes. Vladimir Tarasenko then tied the game on the ensuing power play, followed by Barret Jackman scoring the game-winner at 5:50 of overtime to give St. Louis a 4–3 win. Blackhawks goalie Corey Crawford then stopped all 34 Blues shots to help give Chicago a 2–0 victory in game three. In game four, Patrick Kane scored two of the Blackhawks' goals in a 4–3 win, including the game-winner at 11:17 of overtime in which he took a pass in the defensive zone and then raced up ice to score from a shot from the left circle. Jonathan Toews gave Chicago a 3–2 win in game five, scoring on a breakaway at 7:36 of overtime. The Blackhawks then clinched the series with a 5–1 victory in game six, scoring 4 unanswered goals in the third period.

April 17	Chicago Blackhawks	3–4	3OT	St. Louis Blues	Scottrade Center	Recap
Johnny Oduya (1) – 11:14; Brent Seabrook (1) – pp – 14:39; Patrick Kane (1) – 18:24		First period		04:40 – Adam Cracknell (1); 15:52 – Vladimir Tarasenko (1)
No scoring		Second period		No scoring
No scoring		Third period		18:15 – Jaden Schwartz (1)
No scoring		Third overtime period		00:26 – Alexander Steen (1)
Corey Crawford 48 saves / 52 shots		Goalie stats		Ryan Miller 39 saves / 42 shots

April 19	Chicago Blackhawks	3–4	OT	St. Louis Blues	Scottrade Center	Recap
No scoring		First period		07:08 – Chris Porter (1); 19:58 – Kevin Shattenkirk (1)
Duncan Keith (1) – 17:25		Second period		No scoring
Brent Seabrook (2) – 04:53; Michal Rozsival (1) – 06:38		Third period		19:53 – pp – Vladimir Tarasenko (2)
No scoring		First overtime period		05:50 – Barret Jackman (1)
Corey Crawford 27 saves / 31 shots		Goalie stats		Ryan Miller 25 saves / 28 shots

April 21	St. Louis Blues	0–2	Chicago Blackhawks	United Center	Recap
No scoring		First period	04:10 – Jonathan Toews (1)
No scoring		Second period	No scoring
No scoring		Third period	19:40 – en – Marcus Kruger (1)
Ryan Miller 23 saves / 24 shots		Goalie stats	Corey Crawford 34 saves / 34 shots

April 23	St. Louis Blues	3–4	OT	Chicago Blackhawks	United Center	Recap
No scoring		First period		No scoring
Vladimir Tarasenko (3) – pp – 18:51; Maxim Lapierre (1) – 19:56		Second period		08:40 – pp – Andrew Shaw (1); 16:09 – Patrick Kane (2)
Vladimir Tarasenko (4) – 12:26		Third period		16:08 – Bryan Bickell (1)
No scoring		First overtime period		11:17 – Patrick Kane (3)
Ryan Miller 30 saves / 34 shots		Goalie stats		Corey Crawford 30 saves / 33 shots

April 25	Chicago Blackhawks	3–2	OT	St. Louis Blues	Scottrade Center	Recap
Marian Hossa (1) – 16:11		First period		No scoring
Ben Smith (1) – 17:10		Second period		11:04 – T. J. Oshie (1)
No scoring		Third period		01:42 – Alex Pietrangelo (1)
Jonathan Toews (2) – 07:36		First overtime period		No scoring
Corey Crawford 27 saves / 29 shots		Goalie stats		Ryan Miller 27 saves / 30 shots

April 27	St. Louis Blues	1–5	Chicago Blackhawks	United Center	Recap
T. J. Oshie (2) – 16:28		First period	04:12 – Bryan Bickell (2)
No scoring		Second period	No scoring
No scoring		Third period	00:44 – pp – Jonathan Toews (3); 02:01 – Patrick Sharp (1); 07:30 – Andrew Shaw (2); 17:05 – Duncan Keith (2)
Ryan Miller 22 saves / 27 shots		Goalie stats	Corey Crawford 35 saves / 36 shots

Chicago won series 4–2

==== (P1) Anaheim Ducks vs. (WC2) Dallas Stars ====
The Anaheim Ducks finished first overall in the Pacific Division, earning 116 points. The Dallas Stars earned 91 points during the regular season and entered the playoffs as the Western Conference's second wild card. This was the third playoff meeting for these two franchises; the Mighty Ducks earned a six-game series victory in the 2003 Western Conference semifinals, while the Stars earned a six-game series victory in the 2008 Western Conference quarterfinals. The Stars won two of the three games in this year's regular season series.

The Ducks defeated the Stars in six games, with the home team winning the first five games. Anaheim head coach Bruce Boudreau decided to start the series with Frederik Andersen in net, who was the hotter goalie going into the postseason, rather than original Ducks starter Jonas Hiller. Anaheim jumped to a 4–0 lead in game one but had to hold off a Dallas comeback in a 4–3 win. The Ducks scored three unanswered goals in game two, but had to hold off another Stars comeback to preserve a 3–2 victory. The series moved to Dallas for game three, where Stars goaltender Kari Lehtonen stopped all 37 Anaheim shots to earn his first playoff victory in a 3–0 win. Dallas then evened the series with a 4–2 victory in game four, scoring 4 unanswered goals to overcome a two-goal deficit. Returning to Anaheim for game five, the Ducks scored three unanswered goals in the third period to pull away for a 6–2 victory. Back in Dallas for game six, the Stars built a 4–2 lead in the second period before Boudreau decided to replace Andersen with Hiller. Anaheim then staged a comeback, first with Nick Bonino's goal with 2:10 remaining in regulation, and then Devante Smith-Pelly's score with 24 seconds left to tie the game and force overtime. Both of these goals occurred with the goalie pulled to give the Ducks an extra attacker. Bonino then scored at 2:47 into the extra period to give the Ducks a 5–4 win; it was the only game in the series won by the road team.

April 16	Dallas Stars	3–4	Anaheim Ducks	Honda Center	Recap
No scoring		First period	01:53 – Kyle Palmieri (1); 12:49 – Ryan Getzlaf (1); 19:30 – Mathieu Perreault (1)
Jamie Benn (1) – pp – 16:36; Colton Sceviour (1) – 18:09		Second period	09:04 – pp – Matt Beleskey (1)
Tyler Seguin (1) – 13:53		Third period	No scoring
Kari Lehtonen 31 saves / 35 shots		Goalie stats	Frederik Andersen 32 saves / 35 shots

April 18	Dallas Stars	2–3	Anaheim Ducks	Honda Center	Recap
Alex Chiasson (1) – pp – 07:40		First period	17:14 – Ryan Getzlaf (2)
No scoring		Second period	16:15 – Corey Perry (1)
Ryan Garbutt (1) – 09:58		Third period	05:09 – sh – Andrew Cogliano (1)
Kari Lehtonen 16 saves / 19 shots		Goalie stats	Frederik Andersen 34 saves / 36 shots

April 21	Anaheim Ducks	0–3	Dallas Stars	American Airlines Center	Recap
No scoring		First period	19:25 – Jamie Benn (2)
No scoring		Second period	17:15 – Valeri Nichushkin (1)
No scoring		Third period	07:52 – Ryan Garbutt (2)
Frederik Andersen 19 saves / 22 shots		Goalie stats	Kari Lehtonen 37 saves / 37 shots

April 23	Anaheim Ducks	2–4	Dallas Stars	American Airlines Center	Recap
Bryan Allen (1) – 12:17; Patrick Maroon (1) – 18:16		First period	No scoring
No scoring		Second period	00:27 – Jamie Benn (3); 06:33 – Vernon Fiddler (1)
No scoring		Third period	06:22 – Cody Eakin (1); 07:44 – Alex Goligoski (1)
Frederik Andersen 21 saves / 25 shots Jonas Hiller 1 save / 1 shot		Goalie stats	Kari Lehtonen 21 saves / 23 shots

April 25	Dallas Stars	2–6	Anaheim Ducks	Honda Center	Recap
Jamie Benn (4) – sh – 10:00		First period	05:32 – pp – Nick Bonino (1); 10:26 – pp – Rickard Rakell (1)
Shawn Horcoff (1) – 08:19		Second period	01:05 – pp – Mathieu Perreault (2)
No scoring		Third period	01:07 – Jakob Silfverberg (1); 04:30 – Ryan Getzlaf (3); 06:49 – pp – Corey Perry (2)
Kari Lehtonen 16 saves / 21 shots Tim Thomas 1 save / 2 shots		Goalie stats	Frederik Andersen 34 saves / 36 shots

April 27	Anaheim Ducks	5–4	OT	Dallas Stars	American Airlines Center	Recap
Devante Smith-Pelly (1) – pp – 17:57		First period		05:16 – Trevor Daley (1); 10:27 – pp – Cody Eakin (2); 19:01 – Ryan Garbutt (3)
Ben Lovejoy (1) – 03:55		Second period		10:33 – Trevor Daley (2)
Nick Bonino (2) – 17:50; Devante Smith-Pelly (2) – 19:36		Third period		No scoring
Nick Bonino (3) – 02:47		First overtime period		No scoring
Frederik Andersen 8 saves / 12 shots Jonas Hiller 12 saves / 12 shots		Goalie stats		Kari Lehtonen 25 saves / 30 shots

Anaheim won series 4–2

==== (P2) San Jose Sharks vs. (P3) Los Angeles Kings ====
The San Jose Sharks finished second overall in the Pacific Division, earning 111 points. The Los Angeles Kings earned 100 points during the regular season, to finish third overall in the Pacific Division. This was the third playoff meeting between these two teams; the Sharks earned a six-game series victory in the 2011 Western Conference quarterfinals, while the Kings earned a seven-game series victory in the 2013 Western Conference semifinals. The Kings won three of the five games in this year's regular season series.

The Kings became just the fourth team in NHL playoff history (after the 1942 Toronto Maple Leafs, 1975 New York Islanders, and the 2010 Philadelphia Flyers) to come back from a 3–0 deficit to win a series 4–3, and the second after the 1942 Maple Leafs to go on to win the Stanley Cup. The Sharks controlled the first two games in the series, winning 6–3 and 7–2 in game one and game two, respectively, scoring 12 total goals on Kings goalie Jonathan Quick and an empty netter. In game three, Patrick Marleau scored at 6:20 into overtime to give San Jose a 4–3 victory. However, in game four Justin Williams scored two goals to lead Los Angeles to a 6–3 win. At San Jose for game five, Quick posted a shutout, as he stopped all 30 San Jose shots. In game six, San Jose head coach Todd McLellan started goalie Alex Stalock instead of Antti Niemi. Williams' game-winning goal (his second of the game) at 11:56 into the third period of game six to break a 1–1 tie was met with controversy. Stalock attempted to control a loose puck in his crease, but Williams managed to poke it through Stalock's legs across the goal line. It appeared that Williams pushed Stalock backwards during the play, and the puck seemed to disappear out of sight under the goalie's pads before Williams poked at it. The play went to video review but the call of goal on the ice stood. The Kings' Anze Kopitar then scored two more unanswered goals in a 4–1 victory. Niemi was reinstated as the Sharks starter for game seven, but the Kings scored 5 unanswered goals, and killed all six San Jose power plays, to win the game 5–1. Mike Richards and Jeff Carter, who both played for the Flyers in 2010, became the first players in NHL history to be part of two teams that won the final four games of a series, after initially facing a 3–0 series deficit.

April 17	Los Angeles Kings	3–6	San Jose Sharks	SAP Center	Recap
No scoring		First period	03:06 – Joe Thornton (1); 19:08 – Tomas Hertl (1); 19:56 – Patrick Marleau (1)
No scoring		Second period	12:57 – Raffi Torres (1); 16:29 – pp – Marc-Edouard Vlasic (1)
Jake Muzzin (1) – 02:01; Slava Voynov (1) – 06:55; Trevor Lewis (1) – 13:59		Third period	19:05 – en – Brent Burns (1)
Jonathan Quick 23 saves / 28 shots Martin Jones 4 saves / 4 shots		Goalie stats	Antti Niemi 31 saves / 34 shots

April 20	Los Angeles Kings	2–7	San Jose Sharks	SAP Center	Recap
Jake Muzzin (2) – 01:51; Trevor Lewis (2) – 09:33		First period	No scoring
No scoring		Second period	04:25 – Mike Brown (1); 09:04 – Raffi Torres (2); 14:45 – Justin Braun (1)
No scoring		Third period	01:08 – Patrick Marleau (2); 04:07 – Joe Pavelski (1); 08:08 – Logan Couture (1); 10:06 – pp – Joe Thornton (2)
Jonathan Quick 33 saves / 40 shots		Goalie stats	Antti Niemi 24 saves / 26 shots

April 22	San Jose Sharks	4–3	OT	Los Angeles Kings	Staples Center	Recap
Brent Burns (2) – pp – 03:16		First period		No scoring
Matt Nieto (1) – 09:17		Second period		04:48 – pp – Jarret Stoll (1); 07:59 – Marian Gaborik (1)
Tomas Hertl (2) – 09:17		Third period		00:51 – pp – Jeff Carter (1)
Patrick Marleau (3) – 06:20		First overtime period		No scoring
Antti Niemi 28 saves / 31 shots		Goalie stats		Jonathan Quick 36 saves / 40 shots

April 24	San Jose Sharks	3–6	Los Angeles Kings	Staples Center	Recap
James Sheppard (1) – 19:52		First period	04:08 – Marian Gaborik (2)
Matt Nieto (2) – 08:25		Second period	03:52 – pp – Justin Williams (1); 16:07 – Justin Williams (2); 19:01 – Tyler Toffoli (1)
Joe Pavelski (2) – pp – 11:36		Third period	00:34 – Marian Gaborik (3); 18:32 – en – Dustin Brown (1)
Antti Niemi 21 saves / 26 shots Alex Stalock 4 saves / 4 shots		Goalie stats	Jonathan Quick 36 saves / 39 shots

April 26	Los Angeles Kings	3–0	San Jose Sharks	SAP Center	Recap
Tyler Toffoli (2) – 08:09; Anze Kopitar (1) – 12:52		First period	No scoring
Jeff Carter (2) – pp – 00:22		Second period	No scoring
No scoring		Third period	No scoring
Jonathan Quick 30 saves / 30 shots		Goalie stats	Antti Niemi 16 saves / 19 shots Alex Stalock 22 saves / 22 shots

April 28	San Jose Sharks	1–4	Los Angeles Kings	Staples Center	Recap
No scoring		First period	05:39 – Justin Williams (3)
James Sheppard (2) – 12:26		Second period	No scoring
No scoring		Third period	11:56 – Justin Williams (4); 13:27 – Anze Kopitar (2); 14:42 – pp – Anze Kopitar (3)
Alex Stalock 26 saves / 30 shots		Goalie stats	Jonathan Quick 25 saves / 26 shots

April 30	Los Angeles Kings	5–1	San Jose Sharks	SAP Center	Recap
No scoring		First period	No scoring
Drew Doughty (1) – pp – 04:57; Anze Kopitar (4) – 18:39		Second period	00:28 – Matt Irwin (1)
Tyler Toffoli (3) – 04:40; Dustin Brown (2) – en – 17:53; Tanner Pearson (1) – en – 19:12		Third period	No scoring
Jonathan Quick 39 saves / 40 shots		Goalie stats	Antti Niemi 25 saves / 28 shots

Los Angeles won series 4–3

== Second round ==
=== Eastern Conference second round ===
==== (A1) Boston Bruins vs. (A3) Montreal Canadiens ====
One of the greatest rivalries in North American professional sports, this was the 34th meeting between these teams in the postseason, which is the most frequent playoff series in NHL history. Coming into the series, Montreal owned a record of 24–9 against Boston in the 33 previous series played by the teams, and had won 18 straight between 1946 and 1987. However, the Bruins had won the two most recent series between these two teams, the last of which was a seven-game Boston victory in the 2011 Eastern Conference quarterfinals. The Canadiens won three of the four games in this year's regular season series.

The Canadiens eliminated the Bruins in seven games. P. K. Subban scored 4:17 into the second overtime to give Montreal a 4–3 victory in game one. In game two, the Bruins scored four unanswered goals in the third period to overcome a two-goal deficit to win 5–3. In game three, the Canadiens built a 3–0 lead, as Subban and Dale Weise each had a goal and an assist, en route to a 4–2 win. Matt Fraser then scored the only goal in game four at 1:19 into overtime in Boston's 1–0 victory. In game five, Reilly Smith and Jarome Iginla scored two power play goals 32 seconds apart in the second period to help give the Bruins a 4–2 win. However, Carey Price stopped all 26 Boston shots, and Thomas Vanek scored two goals, helping to give Montreal a 4–0 win in game six. In Boston for game seven, Montreal defeated the Bruins 3–1, as Price made 29 saves.

May 1	Montreal Canadiens	4–3	2OT	Boston Bruins	TD Garden	Recap
P. K. Subban (1) – pp – 11:23		First period		No scoring
Rene Bourque (4) – 03:38		Second period		No scoring
Francis Bouillon (1) – 12:09		Third period		02:44 – Reilly Smith (2); 06:30 – Torey Krug (2); 18:02 – Johnny Boychuk (1)
P. K. Subban (2) – pp – 04:17		Second overtime period		No scoring
Carey Price 48 saves / 51 shots		Goalie stats		Tuukka Rask 29 saves / 33 shots

May 3	Montreal Canadiens	3–5	Boston Bruins	TD Garden	Recap
No scoring		First period	13:02 – Daniel Paille (1)
Mike Weaver (1) – 01:09; Thomas Vanek (2) – pp – 18:09		Second period	No scoring
Thomas Vanek (3) – pp – 06:30		Third period	10:56 – Dougie Hamilton (2); 14:17 – Patrice Bergeron (2); 16:28 – Reilly Smith (3); 18:54 – en – Milan Lucic (4)
Carey Price 30 saves / 34 shots		Goalie stats	Tuukka Rask 25 saves / 28 shots

May 6	Boston Bruins	2–4	Montreal Canadiens	Bell Centre	Recap
No scoring		First period	10:57 – Tomas Plekanec (3); 14:44 – P. K. Subban (3)
Patrice Bergeron (3) – 17:48		Second period	13:52 – Dale Weise (2)
Jarome Iginla (3) – 17:44		Third period	19:57 – en – Lars Eller (3)
Tuukka Rask 22 saves / 25 shots		Goalie stats	Carey Price 26 saves / 28 shots

May 8	Boston Bruins	1–0	OT	Montreal Canadiens	Bell Centre	Recap
No scoring		First period		No scoring
No scoring		Second period		No scoring
No scoring		Third period		No scoring
Matt Fraser (1) – 01:19		First overtime period		No scoring
Tuukka Rask 33 saves / 33 shots		Goalie stats		Carey Price 34 saves / 35 shots

May 10	Montreal Canadiens	2–4	Boston Bruins	TD Garden	Recap
No scoring		First period	13:20 – Carl Soderberg (1)
Brendan Gallagher (4) – pp – 14:39		Second period	01:04 – pp – Reilly Smith (4); 01:36 – pp – Jarome Iginla (4)
P. K. Subban (4) – pp – 17:31		Third period	14:12 – Loui Eriksson (2)
Carey Price 26 saves / 30 shots		Goalie stats	Tuukka Rask 29 saves / 31 shots

May 12	Boston Bruins	0–4	Montreal Canadiens	Bell Centre	Recap
No scoring		First period	02:11 – Lars Eller (4)
No scoring		Second period	15:24 – Max Pacioretty (2); 17:39 – pp – Thomas Vanek (4)
No scoring		Third period	16:04 – Thomas Vanek (5)
Tuukka Rask 24 saves / 28 shots		Goalie stats	Carey Price 26 saves / 26 shots

May 14	Montreal Canadiens	3–1	Boston Bruins	TD Garden	Recap
Dale Weise (3) – 02:18		First period	No scoring
Max Pacioretty (3) – 10:22		Second period	17:58 – pp – Jarome Iginla (5)
Daniel Briere (2) – pp – 17:07		Third period	No scoring
Carey Price 29 saves / 30 shots		Goalie stats	Tuukka Rask 15 saves / 18 shots

Montreal won series 4–3

==== (M1) Pittsburgh Penguins vs. (M2) New York Rangers ====
This was the fifth playoff meeting for these two teams, with Pittsburgh winning all four previous playoff series. Their most recent meeting was in the 2008 Eastern Conference semifinals, which Pittsburgh won in five games. Each team won two games in this year's four-game regular season series.

For the first time in their team history, the Rangers overcame a 3–1 series deficit to win a seven-game series. The team who scored first won the game for all seven contests in the series. Much was made early on about scheduling, as the Rangers played five games in seven days, due to going to seven games in the first round and scheduling conflicts at Madison Square Garden. They were the first team to have such a playoff schedule in 25 years, and early on it looked like the schedule might adversely affect the Rangers' chances, noted by many including Rangers coach Alain Vigneault. Derick Brassard scored 3:06 into overtime to give New York a 3–2 victory in game one. Penguins goaltender Marc-Andre Fleury then recorded two consecutive shutouts, stopping all 22 shots in a 3–0 win in game two and 35 shots in a 2–0 victory in game three. Fleury's back-to-back shutouts on back-to-back calendar days was the first time this was ever achieved in franchise history. It was also the first time the Rangers were shut out in back-to-back playoff games since 1937. Pittsburgh also took in game four, 4–2, as Evgeni Malkin had a goal and an assist, and Sidney Crosby recorded two assists. Between games four and five, Rangers forward Martin St. Louis received the news that his mother unexpectedly died at the age of 63 due to a heart attack. Despite being in mourning, St. Louis remained in the lineup, and the emotional spark that it provided turned New York around. The Rangers began their comeback with a 5–1 win in game five, as Brassard scored two of New York's goals and Mats Zuccarello recorded three assists. New York then recorded a 3–1 victory in game six, with three different players scoring goals. Finally, Brad Richards's power play goal 7:56 into the second period proved to be the difference in the Rangers' 2–1 victory in game seven.

May 2	New York Rangers	3–2	OT	Pittsburgh Penguins	Consol Energy Center	Recap
Benoit Pouliot (3) – 05:04; Brad Richards (3) – 17:03		First period		No scoring
No scoring		Second period		07:15 – Lee Stempniak (2); 13:28 – James Neal (2)
No scoring		Third period		No scoring
Derick Brassard (1) – 03:06		First overtime period		No scoring
Henrik Lundqvist 34 saves / 36 shots		Goalie stats		Marc-Andre Fleury 24 saves / 27 shots

May 4	New York Rangers	0–3	Pittsburgh Penguins	Consol Energy Center	Recap
No scoring		First period	No scoring
No scoring		Second period	10:26 – Kris Letang (2)
No scoring		Third period	16:30 – pp – Jussi Jokinen (4); 19:06 – en – Evgeni Malkin (4)
Henrik Lundqvist 32 saves / 34 shots		Goalie stats	Marc-Andre Fleury 22 saves / 22 shots

May 5	Pittsburgh Penguins	2–0	New York Rangers	Madison Square Garden	Recap
No scoring		First period	No scoring
Sidney Crosby (1) – 02:34; Jussi Jokinen (5) – 15:20		Second period	No scoring
No scoring		Third period	No scoring
Marc-Andre Fleury 35 saves / 35 shots		Goalie stats	Henrik Lundqvist 13 saves / 15 shots

May 7	Pittsburgh Penguins	4–2	New York Rangers	Madison Square Garden	Recap
Evgeni Malkin (5) – 02:31		First period	No scoring
Brandon Sutter (4) – sh – 18:27		Second period	05:30 – Carl Hagelin (3)
Jussi Jokinen (6) – 07:02; Chris Kunitz (3) – 14:04		Third period	13:07 – Mats Zuccarello (3)
Marc-Andre Fleury 13 saves / 15 shots		Goalie stats	Henrik Lundqvist 23 saves / 27 shots

May 9	New York Rangers	5–1	Pittsburgh Penguins	Consol Energy Center	Recap
Chris Kreider (1) – pp – 09:36; Derick Brassard (2) – 15:23		First period	No scoring
Derick Brassard (3) – 07:58; Ryan McDonagh (1) – pp – 08:48		Second period	03:23 – Evgeni Malkin (6)
Kevin Klein (1) – en – 17:31		Third period	No scoring
Henrik Lundqvist 31 saves / 32 shots		Goalie stats	Marc-Andre Fleury 30 saves / 34 shots

May 11	Pittsburgh Penguins	1–3	New York Rangers	Madison Square Garden	Recap
Brandon Sutter (5) – 16:56		First period	03:34 – Martin St. Louis (3); 06:25 – Carl Hagelin (4)
No scoring		Second period	15:30 – Derick Brassard (4)
No scoring		Third period	No scoring
Marc-Andre Fleury 26 saves / 29 shots		Goalie stats	Henrik Lundqvist 36 saves / 37 shots

May 13	New York Rangers	2–1	Pittsburgh Penguins	Consol Energy Center	Recap
Brian Boyle (2) – 05:25		First period	No scoring
Brad Richards (4) – pp – 07:56		Second period	04:15 – Jussi Jokinen (7)
No scoring		Third period	No scoring
Henrik Lundqvist 35 saves / 36 shots		Goalie stats	Marc-Andre Fleury 18 saves / 20 shots

New York won series 4–3

=== Western Conference second round ===
==== (C3) Chicago Blackhawks vs. (WC1) Minnesota Wild ====
This was the second playoff meeting for these two teams. Their only previous meeting was in the 2013 Western Conference quarterfinals, which Chicago won in five games. The Wild won three of the five games in this year's regular season series.

The Blackhawks eliminated the Wild in six games, with the home team winning the first five games. Patrick Kane scored two goals to help give Chicago a 5–2 victory in game one. In game two, Bryan Bickell had a goal and two assists in Chicago's 4–1 win. The Wild won game three, 4–0, scoring four goals in the third period and limiting Chicago to only 19 shots on goal. Four different Minnesota players then recorded goals in the Wild's 4–2 victory in game four. In game five, Jonathan Toews scored the game-winning goal at 4:33 into the third period to break a 1–1 tie, and thus give the Blackhawks a 2–1 win. Game six in Minnesota went into overtime, where Kane scored the winning goal after the puck deflected off the glass behind the Wild net and then rolled into the slot, allowing him to take a shot just under the Minnesota crossbar.

May 2	Minnesota Wild	2–5	Chicago Blackhawks	United Center	Recap
No scoring		First period	14:48 – pp – Bryan Bickell (3)
No scoring		Second period	11:21 – pp – Marian Hossa (2)
Clayton Stoner (1) – 02:19; Kyle Brodziak (3) – 06:56		Third period	08:22 – Patrick Kane (4); 16:47 – Patrick Kane (5); 17:19 – en – Bryan Bickell (4)
Ilya Bryzgalov 17 saves / 21 shots		Goalie stats	Corey Crawford 30 saves / 32 shots

May 4	Minnesota Wild	1–4	Chicago Blackhawks	United Center	Recap
No scoring		First period	11:02 – Jonathan Toews (4)
No scoring		Second period	19:04 – Brandon Saad (1)
Cody McCormick (1) – 02:00		Third period	17:15 – Bryan Bickell (5); 18:37 – en – Brandon Saad (2)
Ilya Bryzgalov 18 saves / 21 shots		Goalie stats	Corey Crawford 18 saves / 19 shots

May 6	Chicago Blackhawks	0–4	Minnesota Wild	Xcel Energy Center	Recap
No scoring		First period	No scoring
No scoring		Second period	No scoring
No scoring		Third period	01:41 – Erik Haula (2); 04:18 – Mikael Granlund (3); 17:25 – pp – Zach Parise (4); 18:43 – en – Mikael Granlund (4)
Corey Crawford 14 saves / 17 shots		Goalie stats	Ilya Bryzgalov 19 saves / 19 shots

May 9	Chicago Blackhawks	2–4	Minnesota Wild	Xcel Energy Center	Recap
Patrick Sharp (2) – 19:21		First period	07:24 – Justin Fontaine (1)
Michal Handzus (1) – 06:28		Second period	03:51 – Jason Pominville (2); 07:12 – Nino Niederreiter (3)
No scoring		Third period	03:47 – pp – Jared Spurgeon (3)
Corey Crawford 27 saves / 31 shots		Goalie stats	Ilya Bryzgalov 18 saves / 20 shots

May 11	Minnesota Wild	1–2	Chicago Blackhawks	United Center	Recap
Erik Haula (3) – 16:33		First period	No scoring
No scoring		Second period	09:18 – pp – Bryan Bickell (6)
No scoring		Third period	04:33 – Jonathan Toews (5)
Ilya Bryzgalov 26 saves / 28 shots		Goalie stats	Corey Crawford 27 saves / 28 shots

May 13	Chicago Blackhawks	2–1	OT	Minnesota Wild	Xcel Energy Center	Recap
Kris Versteeg (1) – 01:58		First period		No scoring
No scoring		Second period		02:29 – Erik Haula (4)
No scoring		Third period		No scoring
Patrick Kane (6) – 09:42		First overtime period		No scoring
Corey Crawford 34 saves / 35 shots		Goalie stats		Ilya Bryzgalov 25 saves / 27 shots

Chicago won series 4–2

==== (P1) Anaheim Ducks vs. (P3) Los Angeles Kings ====
This was the first playoff meeting between the Pacific Division and crosstown rivals. The Ducks won four of the five games in this year's regular season series, including a 3–0 win at the NHL's inaugural Stadium Series game held at Dodger Stadium.

The Kings eliminated the Ducks in seven games. The first four games in the series were won by the visiting team. Anaheim head coach Bruce Boudreau started game one with Jonas Hiller in net. However, Marian Gaborik tied the game with about seven seconds remaining in regulation, then scored the game-winner 12:17 into overtime to give Los Angeles a 3–2 win. The Kings also won game two, 3–1, as goalie Jonathan Quick only allowed one power play goal out of 37 shots. Boudreau then named Frederik Andersen as his starting goalie for game three. Andersen made 22 saves out of 23 shots before leaving in the third period due to a lower-body injury. Hiller went into the game as Andersen's replacement and made 7 saves out of 8 shots to help preserve a 3–2 victory for the Ducks. With Anaheim's starting goaltender situation still in flux, Boudreau decided to turn to rookie John Gibson for game four. The 20-year-old Gibson then became the youngest goalie in NHL history to record a shutout in his playoff debut, making 28 saves to give Anaheim a 2–0 win. Gibson followed up his performance by recording 39 saves out of 42 shots, and Devante Smith-Pelly scored two goals, to help give the Ducks a 4–3 win in game five. However, the Kings built a 2–0 second-period lead in game six en route to a 2–1 win. Los Angeles then controlled most of game seven, building a 4–0 second-period lead before Boudreau opted to replace Gibson with Hiller. The Kings then scored another goal against Hiller to make it 5–0 and held to win, 6–2, to advance to the conference finals for the third consecutive year.

May 3	Los Angeles Kings	3–2	OT	Anaheim Ducks	Honda Center	Recap
Alec Martinez (1) – pp – 09:04		First period		11:41 – Matt Beleskey (2)
No scoring		Second period		No scoring
Marian Gaborik (4) – 19:53		Third period		08:08 – Teemu Selanne (1)
Marian Gaborik (5) – 12:07		First overtime period		No scoring
Jonathan Quick 33 saves / 35 shots		Goalie stats		Jonas Hiller 33 saves / 36 shots

May 5	Los Angeles Kings	3–1	Anaheim Ducks	Honda Center	Recap
Marian Gaborik (6) – 00:34; Alec Martinez (2) – 12:07		First period	09:40 – pp – Patrick Maroon (2)
No scoring		Second period	No scoring
Dwight King (1) – en – 19:02		Third period	No scoring
Jonathan Quick 36 saves / 37 shots		Goalie stats	Jonas Hiller 14 saves / 16 shots

May 8	Anaheim Ducks	3–2	Los Angeles Kings	Staples Center	Recap
Corey Perry (3) – pp – 04:06		First period	No scoring
Teemu Selanne (2) – pp – 15:10		Second period	04:59 – pp – Jeff Carter (3)
Ben Lovejoy (2) – 17:05		Third period	19:29 – Mike Richards (1)
Frederik Andersen 22 saves / 23 shots Jonas Hiller 7 saves / 8 shots		Goalie stats	Jonathan Quick 19 saves / 22 shots

May 10	Anaheim Ducks	2–0	Los Angeles Kings	Staples Center	Recap
Devante Smith-Pelly (3) – 16:02; Ryan Getzlaf (4) – pp – 18:45		First period	No scoring
No scoring		Second period	No scoring
No scoring		Third period	No scoring
John Gibson 28 saves / 28 shots		Goalie stats	Jonathan Quick 9 saves / 11 shots Martin Jones 3 saves / 3 shots

May 12	Los Angeles Kings	3–4	Anaheim Ducks	Honda Center	Recap
Trevor Lewis (3) – 09:12		First period	02:15 – Nick Bonino (4)
Marian Gaborik (7) – pp – 18:42		Second period	01:11 – pp – Devante Smith-Pelly (4); 02:34 – Devante Smith-Pelly (5); 08:23 – Jakob Silfverberg (2)
Marian Gaborik (8) – 14:12		Third period	No scoring
Jonathan Quick 20 saves / 24 shots		Goalie stats	John Gibson 39 saves / 42 shots

May 14	Anaheim Ducks	1–2	Los Angeles Kings	Staples Center	Recap
No scoring		First period	08:16 – Jake Muzzin (3)
Kyle Palmieri (2) – 15:42		Second period	14:04 – Trevor Lewis (4)
No scoring		Third period	No scoring
John Gibson 21 saves / 23 shots		Goalie stats	Jonathan Quick 21 saves / 22 shots

May 16	Los Angeles Kings	6–2	Anaheim Ducks	Honda Center	Recap
Justin Williams (5) – pp – 04:30; Jeff Carter (4) – 08:48; Mike Richards (2) – 15:12		First period	No scoring
Anze Kopitar (5) – 02:02; Marian Gaborik (9) – pp – 14:08		Second period	17:02 – Kyle Palmieri (3)
Tanner Pearson (2) – 13:54		Third period	03:42 – Corey Perry (4)
Jonathan Quick 25 saves / 27 shots		Goalie stats	John Gibson 14 saves / 18 shots Jonas Hiller 10 saves / 12 shots

Los Angeles won series 4–3

== Conference finals ==
=== Eastern Conference final ===
==== (A3) Montreal Canadiens vs. (M2) New York Rangers ====
This was the 15th playoff meeting for these two Original Six teams, with each team having won 7 of the 14 previous playoff series. Their most recent meeting was in the 1996 Eastern Conference quarterfinals, which the Rangers won in six games. Montreal most recently made it to the conference finals in 2010, losing to the Philadelphia Flyers in five games, while the Rangers made it to the conference finals in 2012, losing in six games to the New Jersey Devils. Montreal won two of the three games in this year's regular season series.

New York defeated Montreal in six games. With the Rangers holding a 2–1 lead midway through the second period of game one, New York's Chris Kreider collided with Carey Price, injuring the Montreal goaltender's knee. Although Price finished the rest of the period, he did not return for the rest of the series. Peter Budaj played for the rest of the game but the Rangers won 7–2. Canadiens head coach Michel Therrien started rookie goaltender Dustin Tokarski in game two. However Henrik Lundqvist stopped 40 of 41 shots, helping New York to a 3–1 victory.

Early in the first period of game three, Montreal's Brandon Prust leveled Derek Stepan but the referees missed the interference call; the league would later suspend Prust two games. Later in the first period, Daniel Carcillo was penalized for charging into Prust from behind. As linesman Scott Driscoll attempted to escort Carcillo to the penalty box, Carcillo physically attempted to get away from Driscoll, leading to an automatic game misconduct and multi-game suspension. Meanwhile, the last three goals of the game were scored on rebounds and deflections. At 16:58 of the third period, Daniel Briere's shot deflected off of the Rangers's Ryan McDonagh's skate and into the net to give the Canadiens a 2–1 lead. New York then tied the game at 19:31 of the third period after Daniel Girardi's shot deflected of off Chris Kreider and bounced off of Montreal's Alexei Emelin's skate into the net. And finally, 72 seconds into overtime, Tomas Plekanec's shot deflected off of Alex Galchenyuk into the New York net to give the Canadiens the 3–2 win.

The Rangers won game four, 3–2, as Martin St. Louis scored 6:02 into overtime. The Canadiens then bounced back in game five, winning 7–4, as they scored 4 goals out of their first 18 shots, and Rene Bourque recorded a hat-trick. However, Dominic Moore scored game six's only goal late in the second period and with a 1–0 win the Rangers advanced to the Stanley Cup Final for the first time in twenty years.

May 17	New York Rangers	7–2	Montreal Canadiens	Bell Centre	Recap
Martin St. Louis (4) – 04:35; Mats Zuccarello (4) – 06:27		First period	No scoring
Chris Kreider (2) – 18:59; Brad Richards (5) – 19:48		Second period	12:38 – Rene Bourque (5)
Ryan McDonagh (2) – pp – 01:28; Derek Stepan (3) – pp – 04:11; Rick Nash (1) – pp – 04:36		Third period	15:22 – sh – Lars Eller (5)
Henrik Lundqvist 20 saves / 22 shots		Goalie stats	Carey Price 16 saves / 20 shots Peter Budaj 5 saves / 8 shots

May 19	New York Rangers	3–1	Montreal Canadiens	Bell Centre	Recap
Ryan McDonagh (3) – 06:31; Rick Nash (2) – 18:58		First period	06:14 – Max Pacioretty (4)
Martin St. Louis (5) – pp – 08:03		Second period	No scoring
No scoring		Third period	No scoring
Henrik Lundqvist 40 saves / 41 shots		Goalie stats	Dustin Tokarski 27 saves / 30 shots

May 22	Montreal Canadiens	3–2	OT	New York Rangers	Madison Square Garden	Recap
No scoring		First period		15:18 – Carl Hagelin (5)
Andrei Markov (1) – 03:20		Second period		No scoring
Daniel Briere (3) – 16:58		Third period		19:31 – Chris Kreider (3)
Alex Galchenyuk (1) – 01:12		First overtime period		No scoring
Dustin Tokarski 35 saves / 37 shots		Goalie stats		Henrik Lundqvist 22 saves / 25 shots

May 25	Montreal Canadiens	2–3	OT	New York Rangers	Madison Square Garden	Recap
No scoring		First period		07:18 – sh – Carl Hagelin (6)
Francis Bouillon (2) – 08:08		Second period		19:04 – Derick Brassard (5)
P. K. Subban (5) – pp – 02:00		Third period		No scoring
No scoring		First overtime period		06:02 – Martin St. Louis (6)
Dustin Tokarski 26 saves / 29 shots		Goalie stats		Henrik Lundqvist 27 saves / 29 shots

May 27	New York Rangers	4–7	Montreal Canadiens	Bell Centre	Recap
Derek Stepan (4) – 10:44		First period	01:48 – pp – Alex Galchenyuk (2); 12:24 – Tomas Plekanec (4)
Rick Nash (3) – 09:48; Derek Stepan (5) – 12:06; Chris Kreider (4) – pp – 14:12		Second period	03:44 – Max Pacioretty (5); 06:54 – Rene Bourque (6); 15:10 – Rene Bourque (7)
No scoring		Third period	06:33 – Rene Bourque (8); 15:43 – en – David Desharnais (2)
Henrik Lundqvist 15 saves / 19 shots Cam Talbot 6 saves / 8 shots		Goalie stats	Dustin Tokarski 23 saves / 27 shots

May 29	Montreal Canadiens	0–1	New York Rangers	Madison Square Garden	Recap
No scoring		First period	No scoring
No scoring		Second period	18:07 – Dominic Moore (3)
No scoring		Third period	No scoring
Dustin Tokarski 31 saves / 32 shots		Goalie stats	Henrik Lundqvist 18 saves / 18 shots

New York won series 4–2

=== Western Conference final ===
==== (C3) Chicago Blackhawks vs. (P3) Los Angeles Kings ====
This was the third playoff meeting between these two franchises, with Chicago having won both of their previous playoff meetings. This was a rematch of the previous year's Western Conference final, which Chicago won in five games. This was the third straight conference finals appearance for the Kings, while it was Chicago's fourth trip to the conference finals since 2009. Chicago won all three games in this year's regular season series.

The Kings eliminated the Blackhawks in seven games. Chicago took game one, 3–1, as Brandon Saad recorded a goal and assist, and Corey Crawford made 26 saves. In game two, the Kings scored six unanswered goals, including a hat-trick from Jeff Carter, to come back from a 2–0 deficit to win 6–2. Jonathan Toews scored two goals in the first period of game three to give the Blackhawks a 2–1 lead after twenty minutes, but Los Angeles's second line of Carter, Tyler Toffoli, and Tanner Pearson created two second period goals and the Kings won 4–3. The Kings also dominated game four, building a 4–0 lead in the second period en route to a 5–2 victory. Although the Kings rallied to tie game five after falling behind 3–1 in the first period, Michal Handzus scored at 2:04 of double overtime to give the Blackhawks a 5–4 victory. Drew Doughty and Patrick Kane both had a goal and an assist in the third period of a back-and-forth game six, which the Blackhawks won 4–3. The Blackhawks scored the first two goals of game seven. The Kings cut the lead in half with a controversial goal when Kings forward, Jeff Carter, appeared to be offside. The Kings briefly tied the game on a goal by Justin Williams, only to have the Blackhawks regain a 4–3 lead after two Patrick Sharp goals. But Marian Gaborik converted Dustin Brown's rebound to tie the game in the third period, and at 5:47 of overtime Alec Martinez's wrist shot from the blue line deflected past Crawford to give the Kings a 5–4 victory and a spot in the Stanley Cup Final, for the second time in three years.

May 18	Los Angeles Kings	1–3	Chicago Blackhawks	United Center	Recap
No scoring		First period	14:46 – pp – Brandon Saad (3)
Tyler Toffoli (4) – 04:35		Second period	11:54 – Duncan Keith (3)
No scoring		Third period	16:10 – Jonathan Toews (6)
Jonathan Quick 17 saves / 20 shots		Goalie stats	Corey Crawford 25 saves / 26 shots

May 21	Los Angeles Kings	6–2	Chicago Blackhawks	United Center	Recap
No scoring		First period	14:16 – pp – Nick Leddy (1)
Justin Williams (6) – 18:14		Second period	01:40 – Ben Smith (2)
Jeff Carter (5) – pp – 01:37; Jake Muzzin (4) – pp – 04:04; Tyler Toffoli (5) – 08:59; Jeff Carter (6) – 14:44; Jeff Carter (7) – en – 16:29		Third period	No scoring
Jonathan Quick 23 saves / 25 shots		Goalie stats	Corey Crawford 25 saves / 30 shots

May 24	Chicago Blackhawks	3–4	Los Angeles Kings	Staples Center	Recap
Jonathan Toews (7) – sh – 05:26; Jonathan Toews (8) – 13:19		First period	06:16 – pp – Slava Voynov (2)
No scoring		Second period	08:08 – Jeff Carter (8); 14:19 – Tyler Toffoli (6)
Patrick Sharp (3) – 19:55		Third period	11:57 – Drew Doughty (2)
Corey Crawford 28 saves / 32 shots		Goalie stats	Jonathan Quick 24 saves / 27 shots

May 26	Chicago Blackhawks	2–5	Los Angeles Kings	Staples Center	Recap
No scoring		First period	09:00 – pp – Jake Muzzin (5); 11:13 – Marian Gaborik (10); 15:56 – pp – Dustin Brown (3)
Brandon Saad (4) – 14:03		Second period	12:43 – Drew Doughty (3)
Bryan Bickell (7) – 09:29		Third period	18:58 – en – Tanner Pearson (3)
Corey Crawford 16 saves / 20 shots		Goalie stats	Jonathan Quick 22 saves / 24 shots

May 28	Los Angeles Kings	4–5	2OT	Chicago Blackhawks	United Center	Recap
Jarret Stoll (2) – 09:49; Marian Gaborik (11) – 13:16		First period		01:13 – pp – Brent Seabrook (3); 03:40 – Johnny Oduya (2); 11:06 – Brandon Saad (5)
Dustin Brown (4) – 11:08; Tanner Pearson (4) – 13:08		Second period		No scoring
No scoring		Third period		01:17 – Ben Smith (3)
No scoring		Second overtime period		02:04 – Michal Handzus (2)
Jonathan Quick 40 saves / 45 shots		Goalie stats		Corey Crawford 40 saves / 44 shots

May 30	Chicago Blackhawks	4–3	Los Angeles Kings	Staples Center	Recap
No scoring		First period	17:03 – Dwight King (2)
Patrick Kane (7) – pp – 01:12; Ben Smith (4) – 02:49		Second period	No scoring
Duncan Keith (4) – 11:34; Patrick Kane (8) – 16:15		Third period	05:32 – Drew Doughty (4); 07:38 – pp – Alec Martinez (3)
Corey Crawford 26 saves / 29 shots		Goalie stats	Jonathan Quick 21 saves / 25 shots

June 1	Los Angeles Kings	5–4	OT	Chicago Blackhawks	United Center	Recap
Jeff Carter (9) – 16:31; Justin Williams (7) – 17:22		First period		05:06 – Brandon Saad (6); 08:36 – pp – Jonathan Toews (9); 17:34 – Patrick Sharp (4)
Tyler Toffoli (7) – 10:31		Second period		18:25 – pp – Patrick Sharp (5)
Marian Gaborik (12) – 12:43		Third period		No scoring
Alec Martinez (4) – 05:47		First overtime period		No scoring
Jonathan Quick 37 saves / 41 shots		Goalie stats		Corey Crawford 27 saves / 32 shots

Los Angeles won series 4–3

== Stanley Cup Final ==
This was the third playoff meeting for these two teams, with the Rangers having won both previous series. They last met in the 1981 Preliminary Round, a best-of-five series which the Rangers won 3–1. This was the first major professional sports championship final between New York City and Los Angeles since the Dodgers beat the Yankees in the 1981 World Series in a strike-shortened season.

While the Kings won their franchise's first Stanley Cup championship in 2012, the Rangers had not won the Stanley Cup since 1994. The Kings and Rangers split this year's two-game regular season series. This was the third Final appearance for the Kings, while the Rangers made their eleventh Final appearance. This was the first time a Norwegian player appeared in the Final (Mats Zuccarello of the New York Rangers).

June 4	New York Rangers	2–3	OT	Los Angeles Kings	Staples Center	Recap
Benoit Pouliot (4) – 13:21; Carl Hagelin (7) – sh – 15:03		First period		17:33 – Kyle Clifford (1)
No scoring		Second period		06:36 – Drew Doughty (5)
No scoring		Third period		No scoring
No scoring		First overtime period		04:36 – Justin Williams (8)
Henrik Lundqvist 40 saves / 43 shots		Goalie stats		Jonathan Quick 25 saves / 27 shots

June 7	New York Rangers	4–5	2OT	Los Angeles Kings	Staples Center	Recap
Ryan McDonagh (4) – 10:48; Mats Zuccarello (5) – 18:46		First period		No scoring
Martin St. Louis (7) – pp – 11:24; Derick Brassard (6) – 14:50		Second period		01:46 – Jarret Stoll (3); 14:39 – pp – Willie Mitchell (1)
No scoring		Third period		01:58 – Dwight King (3); 07:36 – Marian Gaborik (13)
No scoring		Second overtime period		10:26 – Dustin Brown (5)
Henrik Lundqvist 39 saves / 44 shots		Goalie stats		Jonathan Quick 34 saves / 38 shots

June 9	Los Angeles Kings	3–0	New York Rangers	Madison Square Garden	Recap
Jeff Carter (10) – 19:59		First period	No scoring
Jake Muzzin (6) – pp – 04:17; Mike Richards (3) – 17:14		Second period	No scoring
No scoring		Third period	No scoring
Jonathan Quick 32 saves / 32 shots		Goalie stats	Henrik Lundqvist 12 saves / 15 shots

June 11	Los Angeles Kings	1–2	New York Rangers	Madison Square Garden	Recap
No scoring		First period	07:25 – Benoit Pouliot (5)
Dustin Brown (6) – 08:46		Second period	06:27 – Martin St. Louis (8)
No scoring		Third period	No scoring
Jonathan Quick 17 saves / 19 shots		Goalie stats	Henrik Lundqvist 40 saves / 41 shots

June 13	New York Rangers	2–3	2OT	Los Angeles Kings	Staples Center	Recap
No scoring		First period		06:04 – Justin Williams (9)
Chris Kreider (5) – pp – 15:37; Brian Boyle (3) – sh – 19:30		Second period		No scoring
No scoring		Third period		07:56 – pp – Marian Gaborik (14)
No scoring		Second overtime period		14:43 – Alec Martinez (5)
Henrik Lundqvist 48 saves / 51 shots		Goalie stats		Jonathan Quick 28 saves / 30 shots

Los Angeles won series 4–1

== Player statistics ==
=== Skaters ===
These are the top ten skaters based on points.

Player	Team	GP	G	A	Pts	+/–	PIM
Anze Kopitar	Los Angeles Kings	26	5	21	26	+9	14
Jeff Carter	Los Angeles Kings	26	10	15	25	+5	4
Justin Williams	Los Angeles Kings	26	9	16	25	+13	35
Marian Gaborik	Los Angeles Kings	26	14	8	22	+6	6
Patrick Kane	Chicago Blackhawks	19	8	12	20	+5	8
Drew Doughty	Los Angeles Kings	26	5	13	18	+2	30
Jonathan Toews	Chicago Blackhawks	19	9	8	17	+3	8
Ryan McDonagh	New York Rangers	25	4	13	17	−1	8
Brandon Saad	Chicago Blackhawks	19	6	10	16	+10	6
Martin St. Louis	New York Rangers	25	8	7	15	−5	2

=== Goaltending ===
This is a combined table of the top five goaltenders based on goals against average (GAA) and the top five goaltenders based on save percentage, with at least 420 minutes played. The table is sorted by GAA, and the criteria for inclusion are bolded.

Player	Team	GP	W	L	SA	GA	GAA	SV%	SO	TOI
Tuukka Rask	Boston Bruins	12	7	5	348	25	**1.99**	**.928**	2	752:43
Henrik Lundqvist	New York Rangers	25	13	11	737	54	**2.14**	**.927**	1	1,515:35
Carey Price	Montreal Canadiens	12	8	4	358	29	**2.35**	**.919**	1	738:46
Marc-Andre Fleury	Pittsburgh Penguins	13	7	6	378	32	**2.40**	**.915**	2	799:40
Corey Crawford	Chicago Blackhawks	19	11	8	590	52	**2.53**	.912	1	1,233:50
Semyon Varlamov	Colorado Avalanche	7	3	4	231	20	2.78	**.913**	0	432:28

== Television ==
In Canada, this was the final year that English-language coverage of the Stanley Cup playoffs were broadcast by CBC and TSN, and French-language telecasts were on RDS and RDS2. This included the sixth and final year that CBC and TSN selected the rights to individual series in the first three rounds using a draft-like setup. CBC then held exclusive English-language coverage rights to the Stanley Cup Final. Rogers Media via Sportsnet and TVA then took over national broadcast rights to the NHL beginning in the 2014–15 season (although CBC went on to air Rogers-produced coverage of the playoffs and finals). Due to scheduling conflicts with a Toronto Raptors NBA playoff game on TSN, game three of the Rangers–Flyers first-round series on April 22 was moved to Sportsnet 360—a sister network of the future rightsholder, and joined in progress by TSN following the game.

In the United States, all playoff games were nationally televised by either NBCSN, CNBC, NHL Network, or NBC. During the first round, these telecasts co-existed with those of regional rightsholders, after which NBC had exclusive rights to the remaining games.

Preceded by 2013 Stanley Cup playoffs	Stanley Cup playoffs 2014	Succeeded by 2015 Stanley Cup playoffs
