= Justin Williams =

Canadian ice hockey player (born 1981)

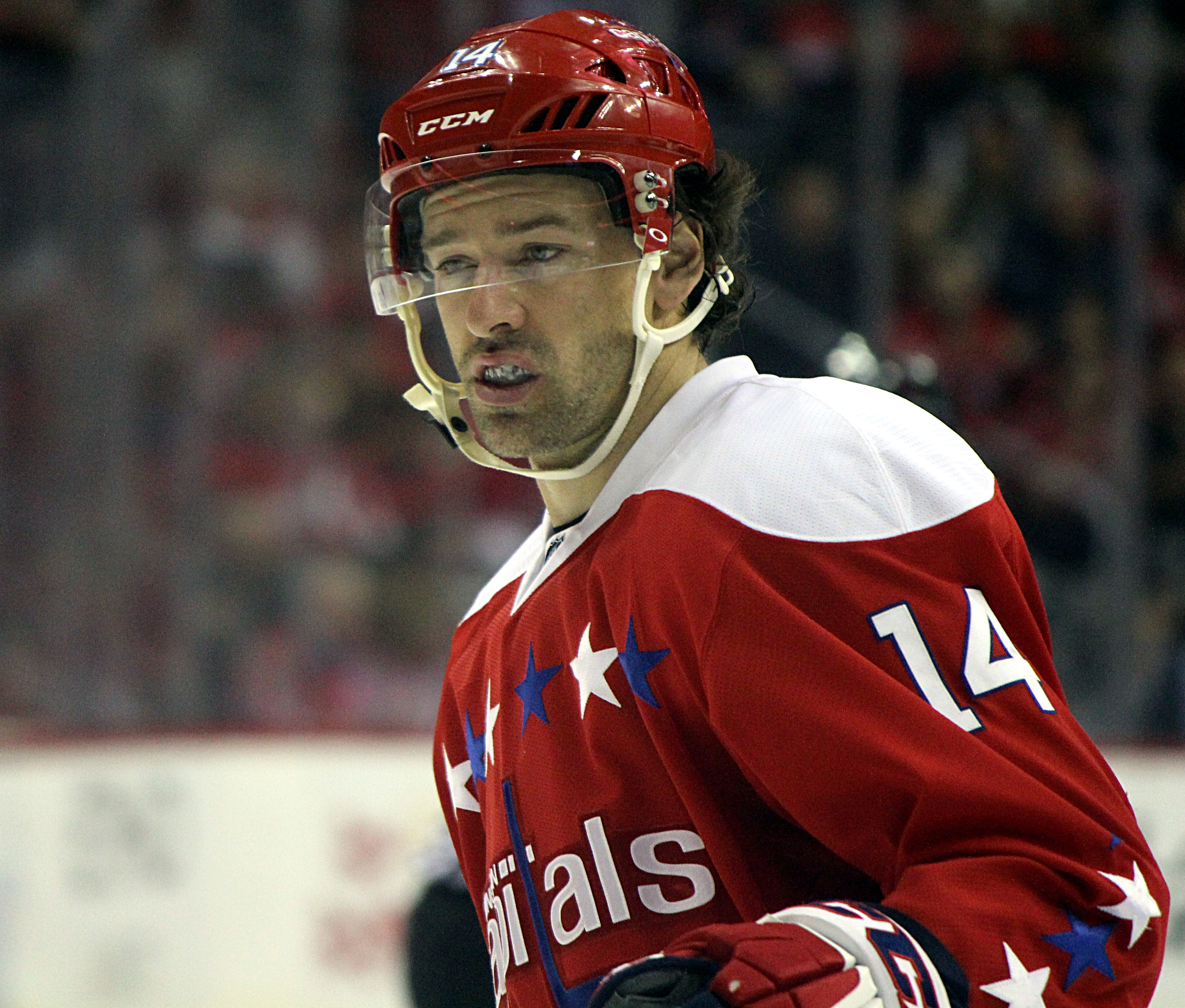
- Williams with the Washington Capitals in 2016
- Born: October 4, 1981 (age 45) Cobourg, Ontario, Canada
- Height: 6 ft 1 in (185 cm)
- Weight: 184 lb (83 kg; 13 st 2 lb)
- Position: Right wing
- Shot: Right
- Played for: Philadelphia Flyers; Carolina Hurricanes; Luleå HF; Los Angeles Kings; Washington Capitals
- National team: Canada
- NHL draft: 28th overall, 2000; Philadelphia Flyers
- Playing career: 2000–2020
Medal record
Representing Canada
Ice hockey
World Championships
Gold medal – first place	2004 Prague
Gold medal – first place	2007 Moscow

Justin Craig Williams (born October 4, 1981) is a Canadian former professional ice hockey right winger. He played in the National Hockey League (NHL) for the Philadelphia Flyers, Carolina Hurricanes, Los Angeles Kings, and Washington Capitals.

Williams won the Stanley Cup three times: in 2006 with the Hurricanes and in 2012 and 2014 with the Kings. Nicknamed "Mr. Game seven", Williams played nine game seven playoff games in his NHL career, with his team sporting a 8–1 record in these games. He currently is tied for most goals in these games with Glenn Anderson at seven, and has the outright record for most game seven points, with 15. Williams won the Conn Smythe Trophy as most valuable player of the playoffs in 2014 with the Kings.

== Early life ==
Williams was born October 4, 1981, in Cobourg, Ontario, to parents Craig and Denise.

== Playing career ==
=== Junior ===
Growing up in Cobourg, Williams played minor hockey in nearby Port Hope in the Ontario Minor Hockey Association (OMHMA) before joining the Cobourg Cougars of the Ontario Provincial Junior A Hockey League in 1997–98. His favourite players growing up were Sergei Fedorov and Wayne Gretzky.

Williams was drafted in the sixth round, 125th overall, by the Ontario Hockey League (OHL)'s Plymouth Whalers in the 1998 OHL Priority Selection. He was signed as a 16-year-old by the Whalers and split time between the OHL club and their affiliate, the Compuware Jr. A. club of the North American Hockey League (NAHL), during the 1998–99 season. He finished his junior career with two seasons played for Plymouth.

=== Professional ===
==== Philadelphia Flyers (2000–2004) ====
Williams was drafted in the first round, 28th overall, by the Philadelphia Flyers in the 2000 NHL entry draft. In four seasons played with the Flyers, Williams struggled to live up to expectations, as he tried to adapt to the varying systems of three separate coaches – Craig Ramsay (2000), Bill Barber (2000–2002) and Ken Hitchcock (2002–2006). Williams was also frequently injured, which simultaneously hampered his development. He broke his left hand in his rookie season (hit by David Tanabe of the Carolina Hurricanes) and had various sprains and strains in his sophomore year. Williams also suffered a left knee injury on January 18, 2003, when he was hit low by the Tampa Bay Lightning's Brad Lukowich. The hit tore Williams' anterior cruciate ligament (ACL) and medial collateral ligament (MCL), and, on January 23, 2003, he had surgery to repair the ligaments. Originally projected to miss four to eight months recovering from the injury, Williams made it back into Philadelphia's line-up in just three months.

==== Carolina Hurricanes (2004–2009) ====
On January 20, 2004, Williams was traded to the Carolina Hurricanes in exchange for defenceman Danny Markov. He finished the season with a career-high 33 assists and 44 points in 79 games for the Hurricanes and Flyers. Once the season ended, he represented Team Canada at the 2004 IIHF World Championship and signed a one-year contract extension with the Hurricanes. However, due to the 2004–05 NHL lockout, he went overseas to play for Luleå HF of the Swedish Elitserien. After recorded 14 goals and 18 assists in 49 games, he returned to the Hurricanes for the 2005-06 season. Before the season began, Williams signed a one-year $1.23 million contract extension with the Hurricanes.

During the 2005–06 season, he set career-highs in games played (82), goals (31), assists (45), points (76) and penalty minutes (60). In game three of the 2006 Eastern Conference Quarterfinals, Williams hit Montreal Canadiens captain Saku Koivu with an errant high stick, severely injuring his left eye. The injury resulted in Koivu missing the remainder of the series and caused Canadiens fans to boo Williams everytime he touched the puck. Williams scored the final goal of the 2006 Stanley Cup Final, an empty net goal at 18:59 of the third period of game seven. On July 1, 2006, Williams signed a new five-year contract with the Hurricanes worth $3.5 million per season.

In 2006–07, Williams recorded career-highs in goals (33), penalty minutes (73), power play goals (12) and game-winning goals (8). It was Williams' second consecutive season of 82 games played. Williams made his first appearance in an NHL All-Star game at the 2007 NHL All-Star Game in Dallas, recording a goal and an assist. Williams also played for Canada in the 2007 IIHF World Championship, in which he won his second gold medal.

Williams continued his previous season's dominance with nine goals and 21 assists by mid-December before suffering a torn ACL and MCL in his left knee. Williams underwent successful surgery for the torn ligaments on December 26, 2007, and returned on April 1, 2008.

On September 17, 2008, Williams was thought to be sidelined for four-to-six months when he tore his right Achilles tendon in an off-ice, pre-season workout. He missed the first 25 games of the regular season but returned from his injury on December 4, 2008. In his first game back, Williams tallied his first goal since November 23, 2007.

==== Los Angeles Kings (2009–2015) ====
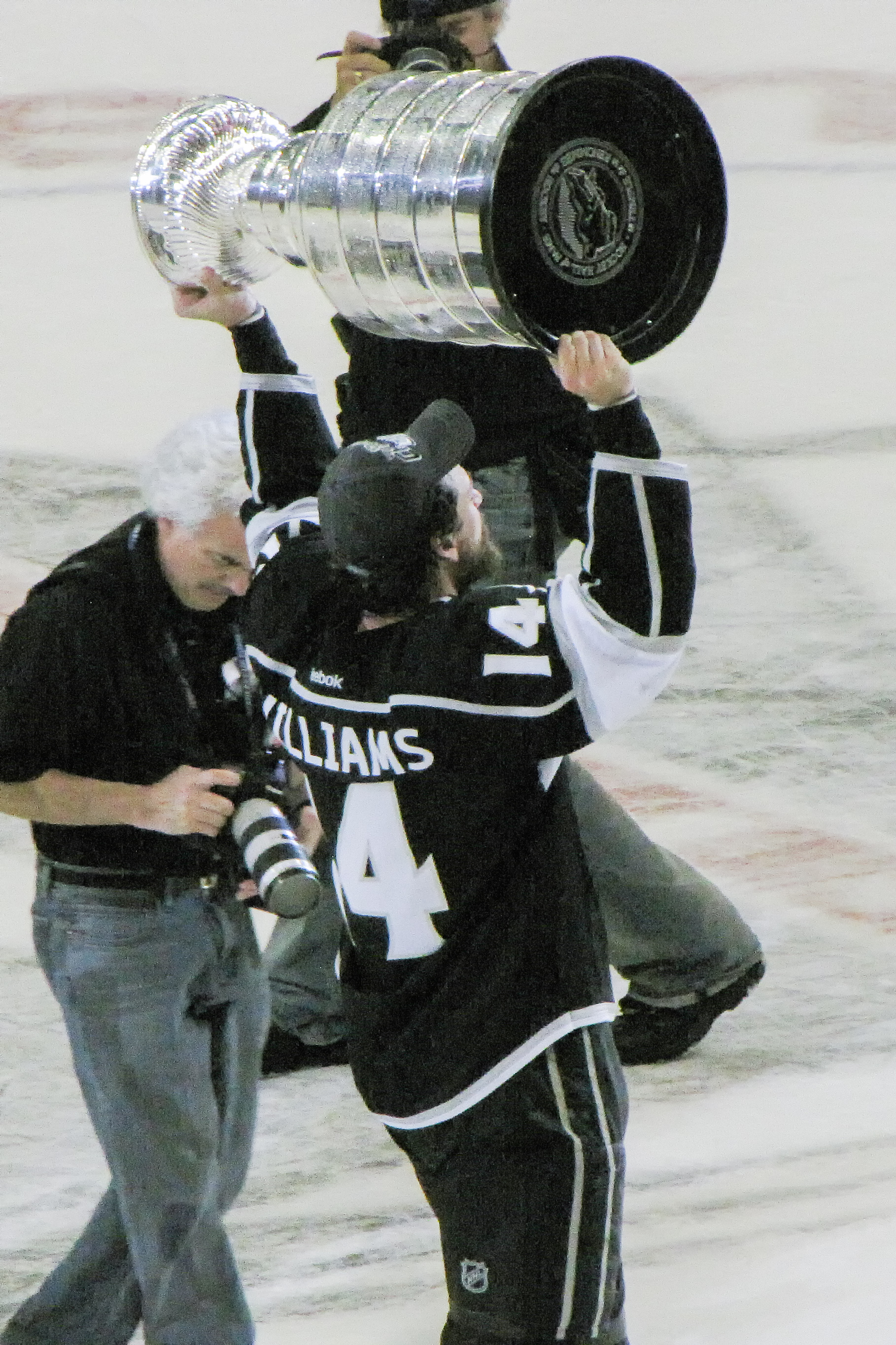
Williams hoists the Stanley Cup after the Kings won the 2012 Stanley Cup Final

On March 4, 2009, Williams was traded to the Los Angeles Kings in exchange for Patrick O'Sullivan and the Calgary Flames' second-round draft pick.

On February 28, 2011, Williams signed a new four-year, $14.6 million contract with Los Angeles. He scored 15 points in the 2012 playoffs, helping the Kings win their first Stanley Cup.

During the 2012–13 season, Williams scored 11 goals with 22 assists, as the defending Stanley Cup champion Kings would make another deep playoff run before ultimately falling in five games to the Presidents' Trophy-winning and eventual Stanley Cup champion Chicago Blackhawks in the Western Conference Finals of the 2013 playoffs.

Williams won the Conn Smythe Trophy as the most valuable player in the 2014 playoffs, where he won his third Stanley Cup and second with the Kings. He scored nine goals and 15 assists during the playoffs, including the game-winning goal in game one of the Final against the New York Rangers, and the Kings' first in the 3–2 comeback in game five to win the Cup. Williams also had points in all three game seven matches the Kings had en route to the Final.

==== Washington Capitals (2015–2017) ====
On July 1, 2015, Williams signed a two-year, $6.25 million contract with the Washington Capitals. He would play his 1,000th NHL game on April 10, 2016. Despite the team winning back-to-back Presidents' Trophies, the Capitals could not advance past the second round in either season.

==== Return to Carolina and retirement (2017–2020) ====
On July 1, 2017, Williams returned to the Hurricanes, signing a two-year, $9 million contract.

On September 13, 2018, Williams was named the captain of the Hurricanes, replacing the co-captaincy of Jordan Staal and Justin Faulk. The Hurricanes qualified for the 2019 playoffs. The team reached the Eastern Conference Final, losing in a four-game sweep to the Boston Bruins. Williams finished with seven points in 15 games.

As a free agent during the 2019 off-season, Williams was undecided on whether he would return to professional hockey. If he chose to return, it would only be with the Hurricanes. On September 2, Williams announced he had "decided to step away from the game." On January 7, 2020, Williams returned to the Hurricanes, signing a one-year, $700,000 contract. In his return to the lineup on January 19, he scored the game-deciding shootout goal to defeat the New York Islanders 2–1.

On October 8, 2020, Williams announced his retirement from professional hockey after a 19-season NHL career.

== Post-playing career ==
On February 7, 2021, shortly after retiring, Williams was hired as a "special advisor" to Hurricanes general manager Don Waddell. In 2026, Williams won his fourth Stanley Cup, his first as team staff and second with the Carolina Hurricanes.

Since the 2023–24 season, he has been a studio analyst for Sportsnet Monday Night Hockey.

== Personal life ==
Williams married his fiancée, Kelly, on August 12, 2006. The couple have two children together: a son and a daughter. They bought a house in Ventnor, New Jersey, in 2009. The family moved to Cary, North Carolina in 2016, and played a role in Williams' decision to return to the Hurricanes.

Williams' great-uncle Zellio Toppazzini was a professional ice hockey player who played 123 games in the NHL with the New York Rangers, Boston Bruins and Chicago Blackhawks and was inducted into the American Hockey League (AHL) Hall of Fame in 2012. Williams is the grandnephew of Jerry Toppazzini, a forward who played 12 seasons in the NHL, most notably for the Boston Bruins.

Williams is a dual citizen of Canada and the United States, having acquired American citizenship by naturalization in June 2017.

== Career statistics ==
=== Regular season and playoffs ===
			Regular season					Playoffs
Season	Team	League	GP	G	A	Pts	PIM	GP	G	A	Pts	PIM
1998–99	Compuware Ambassadors	NAHL	9	4	2	6	23	—	—	—	—	—
1998–99	Plymouth Whalers	OHL	47	4	8	12	28	7	1	2	3	0
1999–00	Plymouth Whalers	OHL	68	37	46	83	46	23	14	16	30	10
2000–01	Philadelphia Flyers	NHL	63	12	13	25	22	—	—	—	—	—
2001–02	Philadelphia Flyers	NHL	75	17	23	40	32	5	0	0	0	4
2002–03	Philadelphia Flyers	NHL	41	8	16	24	22	12	1	5	6	8
2003–04	Philadelphia Flyers	NHL	47	6	20	26	32	—	—	—	—	—
2003–04	Carolina Hurricanes	NHL	32	5	13	18	32	—	—	—	—	—
2004–05	Luleå HF	SEL	49	14	18	32	61	4	0	1	1	29
2005–06	Carolina Hurricanes	NHL	82	31	45	76	60	25	7	11	18	34
2006–07	Carolina Hurricanes	NHL	82	33	34	67	73	—	—	—	—	—
2007–08	Carolina Hurricanes	NHL	37	9	21	30	43	—	—	—	—	—
2008–09	Carolina Hurricanes	NHL	32	3	7	10	9	—	—	—	—	—
2008–09	Los Angeles Kings	NHL	12	1	3	4	8	—	—	—	—	—
2009–10	Los Angeles Kings	NHL	49	10	19	29	39	3	0	1	1	2
2010–11	Los Angeles Kings	NHL	73	22	35	57	59	6	3	1	4	2
2011–12	Los Angeles Kings	NHL	82	22	37	59	44	20	4	11	15	12
2012–13	Los Angeles Kings	NHL	48	11	22	33	22	18	6	3	9	8
2013–14	Los Angeles Kings	NHL	82	19	24	43	48	26	9	16	25	35
2014–15	Los Angeles Kings	NHL	81	18	23	41	29	—	—	—	—	—
2015–16	Washington Capitals	NHL	82	22	30	52	36	12	3	4	7	14
2016–17	Washington Capitals	NHL	80	24	24	48	50	13	3	6	9	6
2017–18	Carolina Hurricanes	NHL	82	16	35	51	56	—	—	—	—	—
2018–19	Carolina Hurricanes	NHL	82	23	30	53	44	15	4	3	7	18
2019–20	Carolina Hurricanes	NHL	20	8	3	11	6	7	1	0	1	9
NHL totals			1,264	320	477	797	766	162	41	61	102	152

=== International ===
Year	Team	Event	Result	GP	G	A	Pts	PIM
2002	Canada	WC	6th	5	0	3	3	6
2004	Canada	WC	1st place, gold medalist(s)	9	0	0	0	4
2007	Canada	WC	1st place, gold medalist(s)	9	1	2	3	16
Senior totals				23	1	5	6	26

== Awards and honours ==
=== NHL ===
Award	Year(s)	Refs
NHL All-Star Game	2007	
Stanley Cup champion	2006, 2012, 2014 (as player); 2026 (as executive)	
Conn Smythe Trophy	2014	

== See also ==
- List of NHL players with 1,000 games played

Awards and achievements
Preceded by Maxime Ouellet	Philadelphia Flyers' first-round draft pick 2000	Succeeded by Jeff Woywitka
Preceded by Patrick Kane	Conn Smythe Trophy winner 2014	Succeeded by Duncan Keith
Preceded by Justin Faulk; Jordan Staal	Carolina Hurricanes captain 2018–19	Succeeded by Jordan Staal
