= Daniel Carcillo =

Canadian ice hockey player (born 1985)

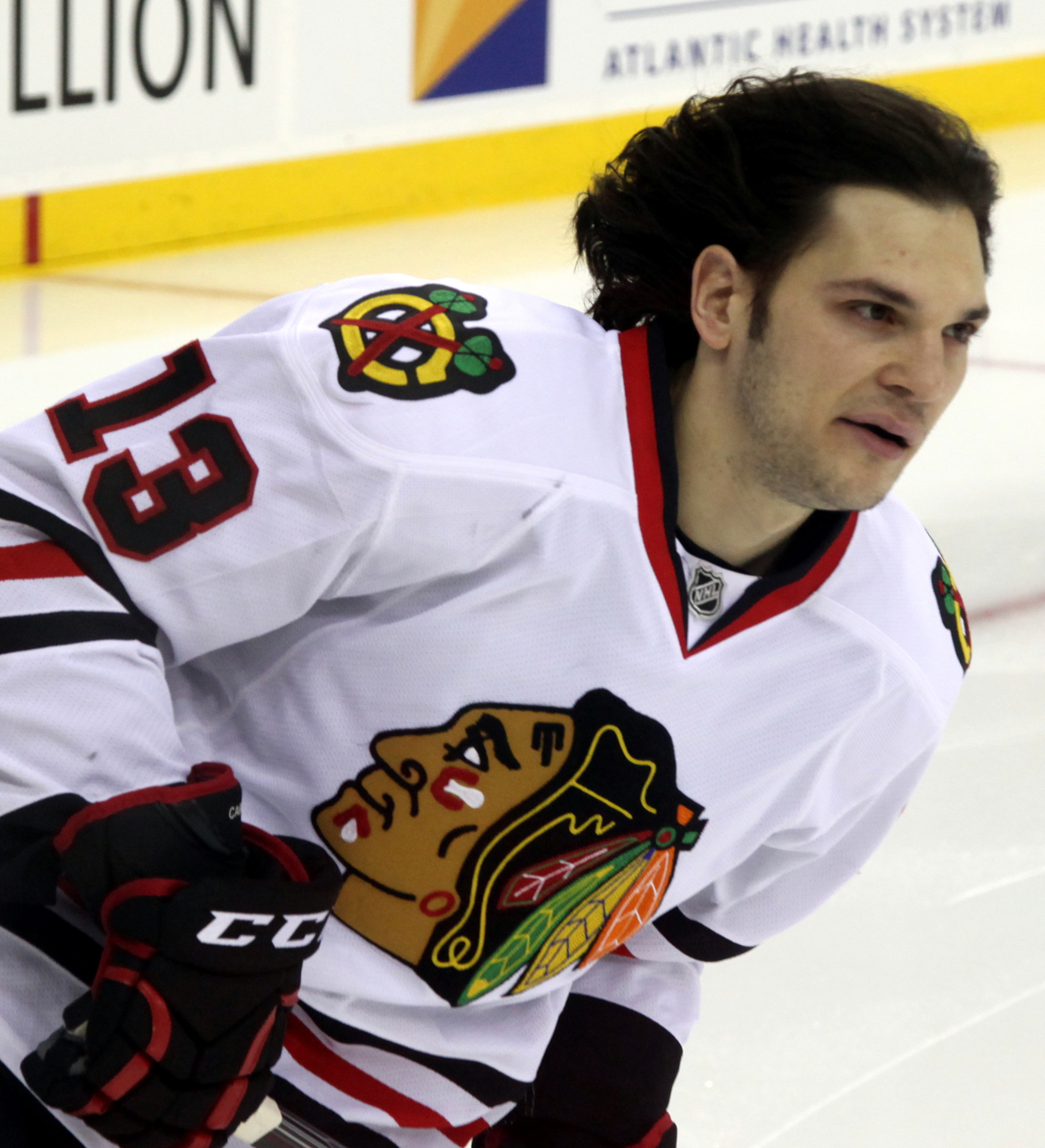
- Carcillo with the Chicago Blackhawks in December 2014
- Born: January 28, 1985 (age 41) King City, Ontario, Canada
- Height: 5 ft 11 in (180 cm)
- Weight: 203 lb (92 kg; 14 st 7 lb)
- Position: Left wing
- Shot: Left
- Played for: Phoenix Coyotes; Philadelphia Flyers; Chicago Blackhawks; Los Angeles Kings; New York Rangers
- NHL draft: 73rd overall, 2003; Pittsburgh Penguins
- Playing career: 2005–2015

Daniel Carcillo (born January 28, 1985) is a Canadian former professional ice hockey left winger. He most recently played under contract to the Chicago Blackhawks of the National Hockey League (NHL). His on-ice reputation as an enforcer has led to him being nicknamed "Car Bomb". Carcillo won a Stanley Cup as a member of the 2013 and 2015 Blackhawks. After retiring from the NHL in 2015, Carcillo created a non-profit organization that assists former NHL-players who are suffering from post-concussion syndrome and mental health issues. Carcillo is the founder and CEO of Wesana Health, a life sciences company that leverages psilocybin-based medicine to treat traumatic brain injuries.

== Playing career ==
After being drafted 73rd overall in the 2003 NHL entry draft by the Pittsburgh Penguins, Carcillo was traded to the Phoenix Coyotes in exchange for Georges Laraque on February 27, 2007. During the 2007–08 regular season, he led the NHL with 324 penalty minutes.

Carcillo was traded to the Philadelphia Flyers on March 4, 2009, in exchange for Scottie Upshall and a 2011 second-round draft pick. His first goal as a Flyer came in Game 4 of the first round of the 2009 Stanley Cup playoffs against Pittsburgh.

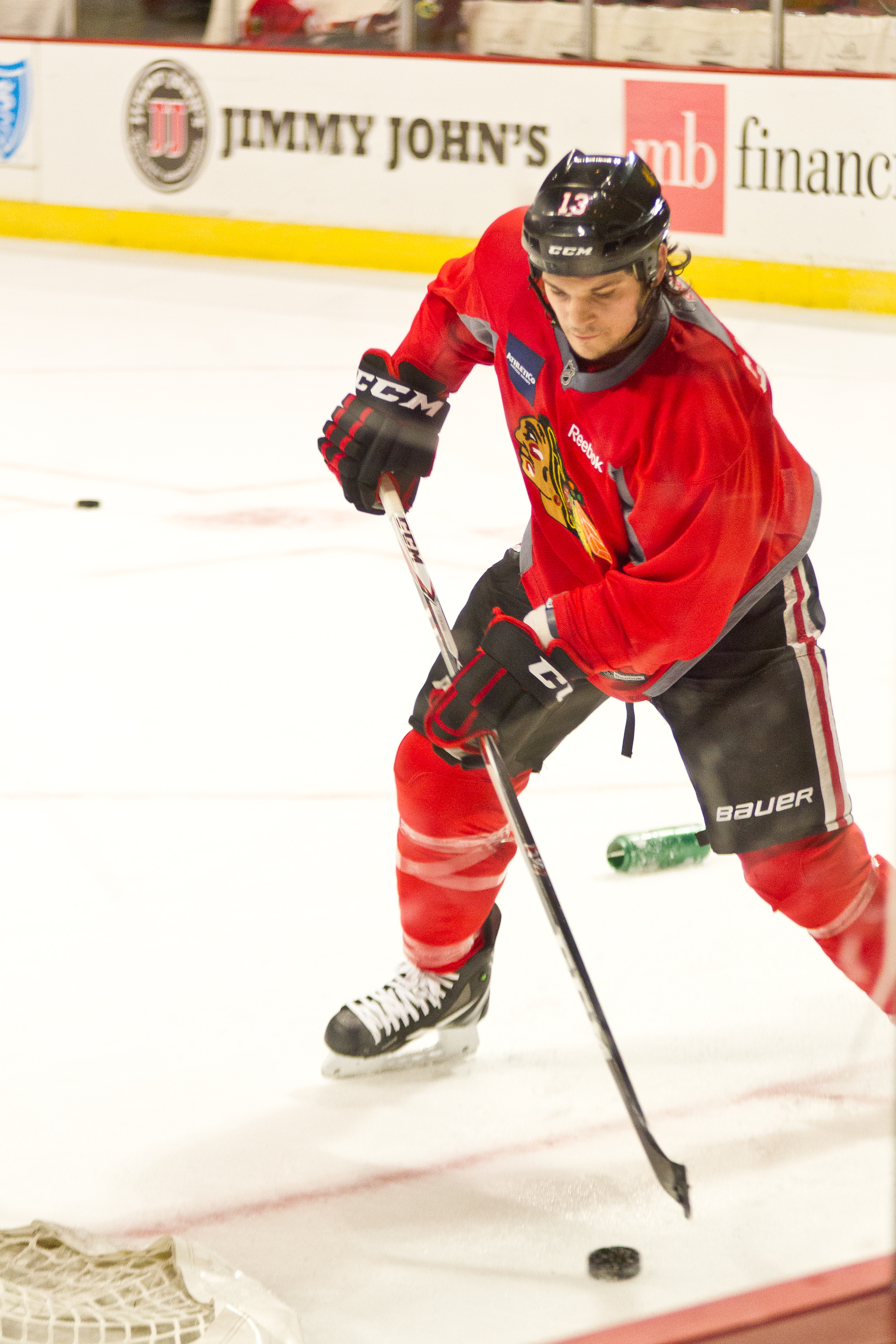
Carcillo in December 2011 during a Chicago Blackhawks practice

Carcillo recorded 12 goals and 20 assists for 32 points in 76 games in the 2009–10 season with 207 penalty minutes. In the 2010 playoffs, Carcillo recorded two goals and four assists for six points in 17 games as the Flyers went to the Stanley Cup Final and would lose in six games to the Chicago Blackhawks.

In the 2010–11 season, Carcillo played in 57 games with four goals and two assists for six points recorded along with two goals and an assist for three points in all 11 playoff games as the Flyers defeated the Buffalo Sabres in seven games in the opening round before getting swept in the following round by the eventual Stanley Cup champion Boston Bruins. In the fourth game, Carcillo engaged in inappropriate conduct with an official after the game ended, resulting in a two-game suspension.

Carcillo signed a one-year contract with the Chicago Blackhawks on July 1, 2011. After missing the first two games of the 2011–12 season (both against the Dallas Stars due to suspension from the previous season's playoffs, Carcillo made his Blachawks and season debut in the third game of the season on October 13 in a 4–3 win over the Winnipeg Jets, recording an assist on a Patrick Kane goal. Carcillo's season came to an early end on January 2, 2012, in a game against the Edmonton Oilers. In that game, Carcillo was assessed a five-minute major penalty and a game misconduct for boarding and attempting to injure Oilers defenceman Tom Gilbert. Both Carcillo and Gilbert were injured on the play, and Carcillo was suspended for seven games. Carcillo, however, tore the anterior cruciate ligament (ACL) in his left knee on the play, and underwent surgery four days later, costing him the rest of the season. On March 12, 2012, Carcillo signed a two-year contract extension with the Blackhawks through to the 2013–14 season.

Carcillo was traded to the Los Angeles Kings on July 16, 2013, in exchange for a conditional sixth-round draft pick. He was then traded to the New York Rangers on January 4, 2014, for a conditional seventh-round draft pick in 2014. On May 23, 2014, Carcillo was automatically suspended ten games during the 2014 playoffs for using physical force against a linesman while being escorted to the penalty box. On June 3, 2014, Carcillo's suspension on appeal was reduced from ten games to six by NHL Commissioner Gary Bettman.

On September 4, 2014, the Pittsburgh Penguins signed Carcillo to a professional tryout contract in order to attend their 2014 training camp. He subsequently failed to make the team and was released. On October 3, 2014, Carcillo was added to the Chicago Blackhawks' training camp roster. He agreed to a one-year, one-way contract at the league minimum of $550,000 for his second stint with the club.

On January 16, 2015, Carcillo injured Winnipeg Jets' forward Mathieu Perreault while delivering a cross-check from behind after the play had been stopped. Perreault left the game and the NHL's Department of Player Safety issued Carcillo a six-game suspension and a fine of $40,243.92 for the hit. The incident marked the twelfth time Carcillo had been fined or suspended in nine NHL seasons. The Blackhawks won 2015 Stanley Cup, and although Carcillo did not make an appearance for the Blackhawks in the 2015 Stanley Cup playoffs, his name was still engraved on the Stanley Cup.

Carcillo's reckless style of play earned him the nickname "Car Bomb".

On September 17, 2015, Carcillo announced his retirement from professional hockey.

== Personal life ==
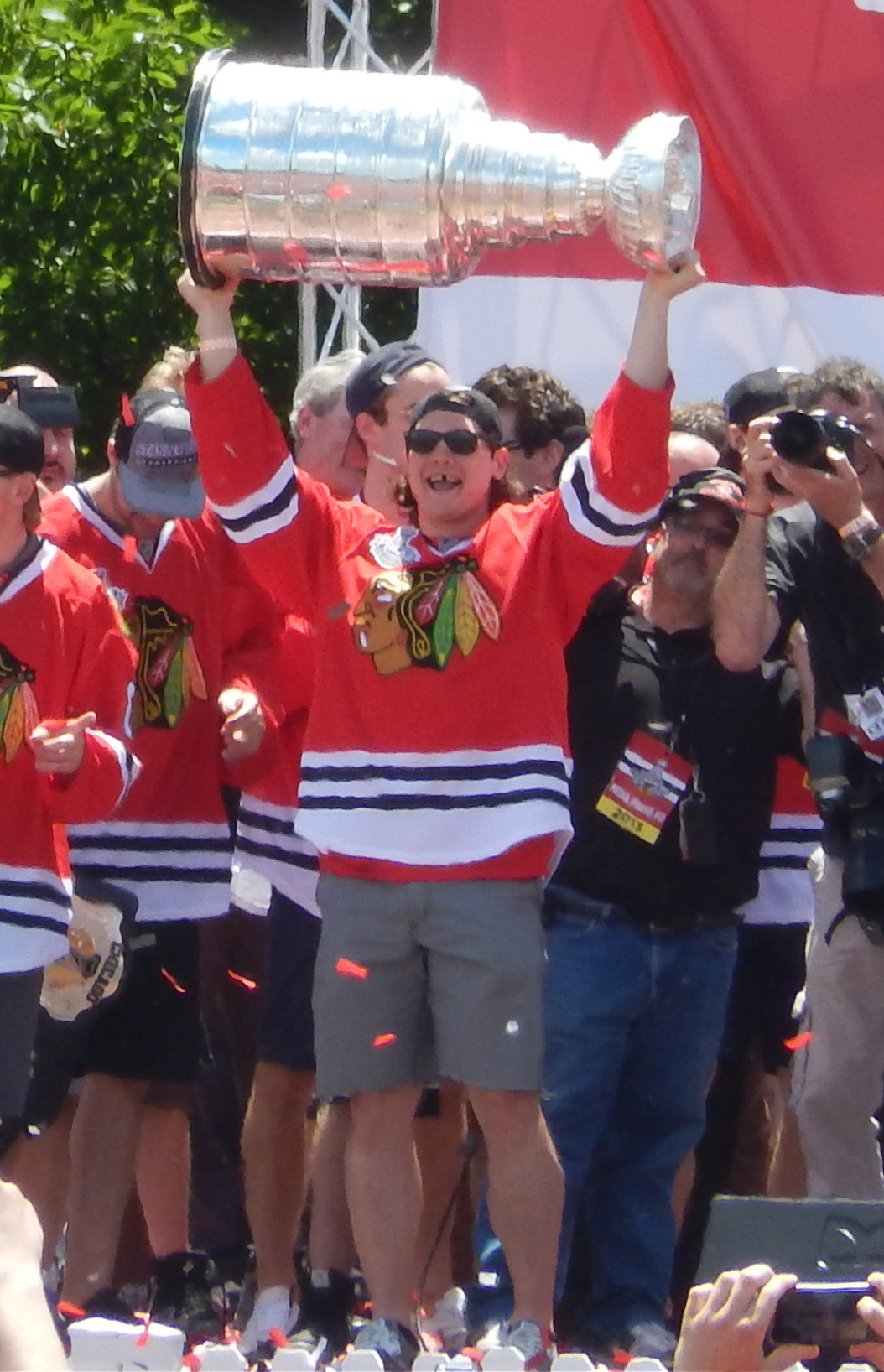
Carcillo hoists the Stanley Cup at the Grant Park rally celebrating the Chicago Blackhawks' 2013 victory.

Carcillo was the host of a music-focused 2011 radio program entitled The Bomb Shelter on WGN Radio 720 in Chicago.

Carcillo has admitted to battling alcohol and substance abuse problems throughout his professional career. Upon joining the Blackhawks, Carcillo became friends with Steve Montador, who was also trying to overcome a substance abuse problem. Montador helped Carcillo battle his alcohol and substance dependencies, but was forced to leave the NHL after sustaining a concussion in 2012. Carcillo remained friends with Montador until the latter's unexpected death in 2015. Montador's death deeply impacted Carcillo, who was also recovering from a concussion. He called for the NHL community to play a larger role in the lives of former players that have suffered concussions. After winning the Stanley Cup in 2015, Carcillo retired from playing professional hockey and established the 'Chapter 5 Foundation', which is dedicated to helping players who are struggling with post-concussion syndrome, anxiety, or depression. Carcillo later founded Wesana Health, which offers treatment for traumatic brain injury using psilocybin.

In November 2018, Carcillo indicated that as a rookie of the 2002-03 Sarnia Sting, he and other rookies were subjected to several forms of severe hazing, which crossed over into physical and sexual assault. Carcillo's accusations were corroborated by several other former Sting teammates, who joined him in a class-action lawsuit against the Canadian Hockey League in 2020.

Carcillo lives in suburban Chicago with his wife, Ela, and three children.

== Career statistics ==
=== Regular season and playoffs ===
Bold indicates led league

			Regular season					Playoffs
Season	Team	League	GP	G	A	Pts	PIM	GP	G	A	Pts	PIM
2000–01	North York Canadiens	GTHL	—	—	—	—	—	—	—	—	—	—
2001–02	Milton Merchants	OPJHL	47	15	16	31	162	—	—	—	—	—
2002–03	Sarnia Sting	OHL	68	29	37	66	157	6	0	4	4	14
2003–04	Sarnia Sting	OHL	61	30	29	59	148	4	1	2	3	12
2004–05	Sarnia Sting	OHL	12	2	7	9	40	—	—	—	—	—
2004–05	Mississauga IceDogs	OHL	20	8	10	18	75	5	3	1	4	18
2005–06	Wilkes–Barre/Scranton Penguins	AHL	51	11	13	24	311	11	1	0	1	47
2005–06	Wheeling Nailers	ECHL	6	3	2	5	32	—	—	—	—	—
2006–07	Wilkes–Barre/Scranton Penguins	AHL	52	21	9	30	183	—	—	—	—	—
2006–07	Phoenix Coyotes	NHL	18	4	3	7	74	—	—	—	—	—
2007–08	Phoenix Coyotes	NHL	57	13	11	24	**324**	—	—	—	—	—
2007–08	San Antonio Rampage	AHL	5	2	1	3	16	—	—	—	—	—
2008–09	Phoenix Coyotes	NHL	54	3	7	10	**174**	—	—	—	—	—
2008–09	Philadelphia Flyers	NHL	20	0	4	4	**80**	5	1	1	2	5
2009–10	Philadelphia Flyers	NHL	76	12	10	22	207	17	2	4	6	34
2010–11	Philadelphia Flyers	NHL	57	4	2	6	127	11	2	1	3	30
2011–12	Chicago Blackhawks	NHL	28	2	9	11	82	—	—	—	—	—
2012–13	Chicago Blackhawks	NHL	23	2	1	3	11	4	0	1	1	6
2013–14	Los Angeles Kings	NHL	26	1	1	2	57	—	—	—	—	—
2013–14	New York Rangers	NHL	31	3	0	3	43	8	2	0	2	22
2014–15	Chicago Blackhawks	NHL	39	4	4	8	54	—	—	—	—	—
NHL totals			429	48	52	100	1233	45	7	7	14	97

=== International ===
Year	Team	Event	Result	GP	G	A	Pts	PIM
2003	Canada	WJC18	1st place, gold medalist(s)	7	2	2	4	33
Junior totals				7	2	2	4	33

== Awards and honours ==
Award	Year
NHL
Stanley Cup champion (Chicago Blackhawks)	2013, 2015
