= List of Philadelphia Phantoms players =

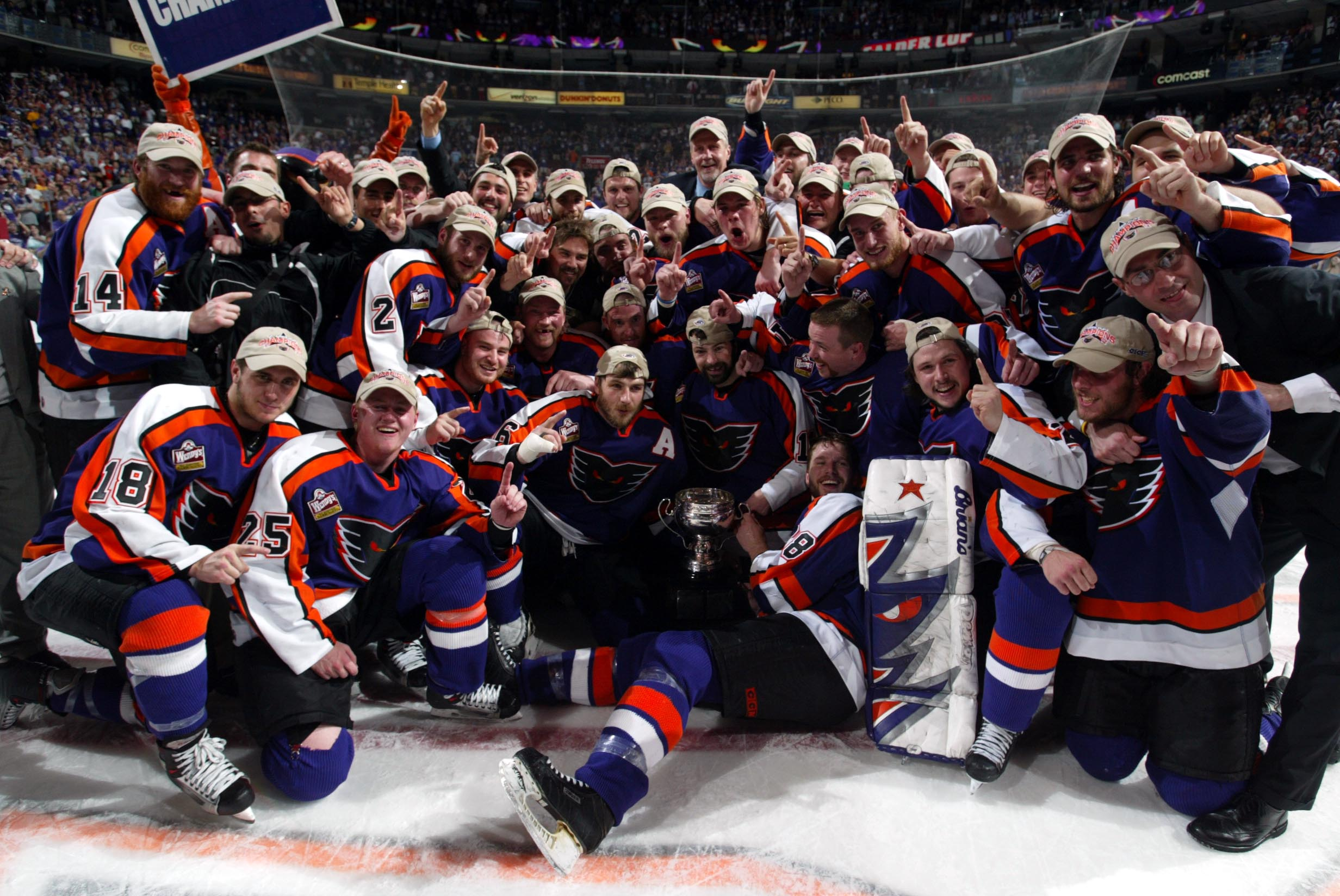
The 2004–05 Philadelphia Phantoms with the Calder Cup on June 10, 2005.

This is a complete list of ice hockey players who played for the Philadelphia Phantoms of the American Hockey League (AHL). It includes players that played at least one match, either in the AHL regular season or in the AHL playoffs. Comcast Spectacor purchased an AHL expansion franchise in December 1995 to play in the Spectrum and from the 1996–97 season to the 2008–09 season, the Phantoms saw 24 goaltenders and 234 skaters wear its jersey. The Phantoms won the Calder Cup in 1998 and 2005 with a total of 46 players. Only goaltender Neil Little was a member of both Calder Cup winning rosters while John Stevens was the captain of the 1998 team and the head coach of the 2005 team.

== Key ==
- † Won a Calder Cup with the Phantoms

General abbreviations
Abbreviation	Definition
GP	Games played
CC	Won the Calder Cup with the team, followed by year(s) won
PHOF	Inducted into the Phantoms Hall of Fame
AHLHOF	Inducted into the AHL Hall of Fame

Goaltender statistical abbreviations
Abbreviation	Definition
W	Wins
L	Losses
T^{[a]}	Ties
OTL^{[a]}	Overtime loss
SO	Shutouts
GAA	Goals against average
SV%	Save percentage

Skater statistical abbreviations
Abbreviation	Definition
Pos	Position
G	Goals
A	Assists
P	Points
PIM	Penalty minutes
D	Defenseman
F	Forward
LW	Left wing
C	Center
RW	Right wing
W	Wing

== Goaltenders ==
Goaltenders who played for the Philadelphia Phantoms
Name	Nat^{[b]}	Seasons^{[c]}	Regular season								Playoffs						Notes
Name	Nat^{[b]}	Seasons^{[c]}	GP	W	L	T	OTL	SO	GAA	SV%	GP	W	L	SO	GAA	SV%	Notes
Bujar Amidovski	(Canada)	1998–2000	8	5	1	0	–	0	2.11	.931	–	–	–	–	–	–	
Jean-Sebastien Aubin	(Canada)	2008–2009	23	10	9	–	1	0	3.36	.896	1	0	1	0	1.03	.967	
Rejean Beauchemin	(Canada)	2005–2007	22	5	13	–	1	1	3.22	.893	–	–	–	–	–	–	
Brian Boucher†	(United States)	1997–2000; 2007–2008	113	59	36	9	1	6	2.73	.906	18	9	7	0	2.82	.908	CC 1998
Roman Cechmanek	(Czech Republic)	2000–2001	3	1	1	0	–	0	1.12	.969	–	–	–	–	–	–	
John DeCaro	(United States)	2006–2007	2	0	2	–	0	0	3.49	.868	–	–	–	–	–	–	
Jeremy Duchesne	(Canada)	2007–2008	2	1	0	–	0	0	4.50	.800	–	–	–	–	–	–	
Jeff Hackett	(Canada)	2003–2004	1	1	0	0	–	0	2.00	.889	–	–	–	–	–	–	
Corey Hirsch	(Canada)	2001–2002	5	2	3	0	–	1	2.81	.883	–	–	–	–	–	–	
Chris Houle	(Canada)	2003–2005	5	0	2	0	–	0	2.22	.916	–	–	–	–	–	–	
Martin Houle	(Canada)	2005–2008	88	32	40	–	3	3	2.90	.903	–	–	–	–	–	–	
Trevor Koenig	(Canada)	1998–1999	1	0	0	0	–	0	4.14	.882	–	–	–	–	–	–	
Michael Leighton	(Canada)	2006–2007	5	2	0	–	2	0	1.56	.948	–	–	–	–	–	–	AHLHOF 2025
Neil Little†	(Canada)	1996–1998; 1999–2005	351	177	121	32	–	18	2.64	.911	52	31	20	5	2.33	.927	CC 1998; CC 2005; PHOF 2006
Scott Munroe	(Canada)	2005–2009	134	65	48	–	8	10	2.62	.917	15	5	10	2	2.55	.915	
Dan Murphy	(Canada)	1999–2002	11	3	7	0	–	0	4.18	.877	–	–	–	–	–	–	
Antero Niittymaki†	(Finland)	2002–2005	147	71	55	12	–	13	2.19	.919	33	21	11	3	1.77	.937	CC 2005
Maxime Ouellet	(Canada)	2000–2002	43	17	13	8	–	1	2.72	.912	–	–	–	–	–	–	
Jean-Marc Pelletier	(United States)	1998–2000	71	39	26	4	–	5	2.67	.911	1	0	0	0	0.00	1.000	
Brian Regan	(United States)	2000–2001	30	12	9	1	–	2	3.16	.898	–	–	–	–	–	–	
Dominic Roussel	(Canada)	1996–1997	36	18	9	3	–	2	2.66	.916	1	0	0	0	6.93	.769	
Jamie Storr	(Canada)	2005–2006	32	13	11	–	5	1	2.86	.907	–	–	–	–	–	–	
Michael Teslak	(Canada)	2007–2009	11	4	5	–	0	0	2.96	.910	1	0	0	0	6.55	.700	
Matthew Yeats	(Canada)	2002–2003	2	1	1	0	–	0	2.67	.902	–	–	–	–	–	–	

== Skaters ==
Skaters who played for the Philadelphia Phantoms
Name	Nat^{[b]}	Pos	Seasons^{[c]}	Regular season					Playoffs					Notes
Name	Nat^{[b]}	Pos	Seasons^{[c]}	GP	G	A	P	PIM	GP	G	A	P	PIM	Notes
B. J. Abel	(United States)	C	2003–2006	131	16	13	29	130	12	1	2	3	21	
Chris Albert	(Canada)	RW	1998–2000	79	7	13	20	328	15	5	5	10	22	
Chad Anderson	(United States)	D	2007–2008	55	2	11	13	35	12	0	2	2	8	
Jack Baker	(United States)	RW	2002–2003	30	4	4	8	35	–	–	–	–	–	
Oskars Bartulis	(Latvia)	D	2007–2009	137	3	31	34	101	4	0	0	0	4	
Ryan Bast	(Canada)	D	1998–2000; 2002–2003	151	1	21	22	379	21	0	0	0	36	
Nolan Baumgartner	(Canada)	D	2006–2007	51	6	20	26	46	–	–	–	–	–	AHLHOF 2022
Josh Beaulieu	(Canada)	D	2007–2009	90	4	4	8	86	–	–	–	–	–	
Jason Beckett	(Canada)	D	2000–2002	65	2	10	12	118	–	–	–	–	–	
Francis Belanger	(Canada)	LW	1998–2001	106	19	22	41	386	16	4	3	7	16	
Rob Bellamy	(United States)	RW	2007–2009	52	2	3	5	18	–	–	–	–	–	
Blake Bellefeuille	(United States)	C	2005–2006	22	0	3	3	20	–	–	–	–	–	
Eric Bertrand	(Canada)	LW	1999–2000	15	3	6	9	67	–	–	–	–	–	
Craig Berube	(Canada)	LW	2003–2004	33	0	6	6	134	–	–	–	–	–	
Eric Betournay	(Canada)	C	2001–2003	37	2	0	2	43	4	0	0	0	0	
Frank Bialowas†	(Canada)	LW	1996–1999	156	12	16	28	555	25	0	2	2	67	CC 1998; PHOF 2004
Chris Bogas	(United States)	D	2000–2001; 2002–2003	30	1	8	9	19	–	–	–	–	–	
Martin Boisvenue	(Canada)	C	1998–1999	5	0	1	1	2	1	0	0	0	0	
Dennis Bonvie	(Canada)	RW	1998–1999	37	4	10	14	158	14	3	3	6	26	AHLHOF 2024
Les Borsheim	(Canada)	D	2003–2004	16	0	1	1	19	–	–	–	–	–	
Jesse Boulerice	(United States)	RW	1998–2002; 2007–2008	201	11	19	30	728	21	1	3	4	34	
Vladislav Boulin	(Russia)	D	1996–1997	51	1	4	5	35	–	–	–	–	–	
Jason Bowen	(Canada)	LW	1996–1998	64	10	12	22	179	6	0	1	1	10	
Pavel Brendl	(Czech Republic)	W	2001–2002	64	15	22	37	22	5	4	1	5	0	
Danny Briere	(Canada)	C	2008–2009	3	1	4	5	2	–	–	–	–	–	
Travis Brigley	(Canada)	LW	1999–2000	15	2	2	4	15	5	1	0	1	4	
Aris Brimanis	(United States)	D	1996–1998	95	15	29	44	95	10	2	2	4	13	
Brett Bruininks	(United States)	RW	1996–1998	51	3	3	6	67	4	1	1	2	2	
Craig Brunel	(Canada)	RW	2001–2003	50	2	2	4	220	–	–	–	–	–	
Mathieu Brunelle	(Canada)	LW	2003–2004; 2005–2006	9	0	3	3	4	–	–	–	–	–	
Garrett Burnett	(Canada)	LW	1997–1998	14	1	2	3	129	–	–	–	–	–	
Frederik Cabana	(Canada)	C	2006–2009	113	13	23	36	155	3	0	0	0	5	
Jim Campbell	(United States)	RW	2005–2006	35	12	17	29	46	–	–	–	–	–	
Jeff Carter†	(Canada)	C	2003–2005	3	0	1	1	4	33	16	12	28	12	CC 2005
Dan Cavanaugh	(United States)	C	2005–2006	26	2	6	8	36	–	–	–	–	–	
Marc Cavosie	(United States)	C	2005–2006	63	8	21	29	28	–	–	–	–	–	
Martin Cerven†	(Czech Republic)	C	1997–1999	96	13	15	28	47	9	1	3	4	2	CC 1998
James Chalmers	(Canada)	C	2001–2002	61	3	8	11	67	–	–	–	–	–	
Mikhail Chernov	(Russia)	D	1998–2001	173	22	21	43	184	25	3	4	7	34	
Eric Chouinard	(United States)	C	2003–2004; 2005–2006	25	7	7	14	4	–	–	–	–	–	
Brandon Christian	(Canada)	LW	1996–1997	2	0	0	0	32	–	–	–	–	–	
Matt Clackson	(Canada)	LW	2007–2009	82	3	6	9	282	4	0	0	0	4	
Phil Cole	(Canada)	D	2005–2006	10	0	0	0	20	–	–	–	–	–	
Bruce Coles†	(Canada)	LW	1996–1998	118	50	72	122	207	27	6	8	14	40	CC 1998
Sean Collins	(United States)	C	2006–2007	3	0	2	2	0	–	–	–	–	–	
Charlie Cook†	(United States)	D	2004–2006	67	2	13	15	48	3	0	0	0	4	CC 2005
Chris Corrinet	(United States)	W	2002–2003	1	0	0	0	0	–	–	–	–	–	
Daniel Corso	(Canada)	C	2006–2007	6	2	4	6	4	–	–	–	–	–	
Riley Cote†	(Canada)	LW	2004–2007	168	8	12	20	664	13	0	0	0	6	CC 2005
Mark Cullen	(United States)	C	2006–2007	56	16	36	52	34	–	–	–	–	–	
Brian Curran	(Canada)	D	1996–1997	3	0	0	0	8	–	–	–	–	–	
Sean Curry	(United States)	D	2008–2009	80	5	13	18	72	4	0	0	0	2	
Dominic D'Amour	(Canada)	D	2008–2009	10	0	0	0	4	–	–	–	–	–	
Craig Darby†	(United States)	C	1996–1998	136	68	78	146	58	30	8	15	23	4	CC 1998
Matt Davis	(United States)	C	2006–2007	69	5	10	15	52	–	–	–	–	–	
Andy Delmore†	(Canada)	D	1997–2000	182	26	62	88	128	33	5	8	13	27	CC 1998
Jason DeSantis	(United States)	D	2007–2009	66	1	21	22	18	10	0	1	1	6	
Nick Deschenes	(Canada)	F	2003–2005	33	5	2	7	12	1	0	0	0	0	
Niko Dimitrakos	(United States)	W	2006–2007	45	15	13	28	34	–	–	–	–	–	
Joe DiPenta	(Canada)	D	2000–2002	132	5	9	14	136	10	1	2	3	15	
Tomas Divisek	(Czech Republic)	RW	1999–2002	169	41	71	112	117	15	4	12	16	6	
Jerramie Domish	(United States)	D	2004–2005	1	0	0	0	0	–	–	–	–	–	
Tyler Donati	(Canada)	RW	2008–2009	4	0	1	1	0	–	–	–	–	–	
Steve Downie	(Canada)	RW	2006–2009	26	6	19	25	137	–	–	–	–	–	
John Druce	(Canada)	RW	1997–1998	39	21	28	49	45	–	–	–	–	–	
Ben Eager†	(Canada)	LW	2003–2007	123	13	22	35	509	19	1	2	3	79	CC 2005
Mark Eaton	(United States)	D	1998–2000	121	18	44	62	44	16	8	4	12	0	
Matt Ellison	(Canada)	C	2005–2007	110	24	40	64	78	–	–	–	–	–	
Brett Engelhardt	(United States)	RW	2003–2004	2	0	1	1	0	–	–	–	–	–	
Todd Fedoruk†	(Canada)	LW	1999–2002; 2003–2005	84	5	18	23	287	21	2	3	5	35	CC 2005
Ruslan Fedotenko	(Ukraine)	F	1999–2001	75	17	34	51	50	2	0	0	0	0	
Rory Fitzpatrick	(United States)	D	2007–2008	19	1	4	5	24	12	0	2	2	11	
Colin Forbes	(Canada)	W	1996–1998	87	28	32	60	130	10	5	5	10	33	
Ian Forbes	(Canada)	D	2001–2003	38	2	1	3	88	2	0	0	0	0	
Mark Freer	(Canada)	C	2000–2002	156	46	77	123	74	15	5	2	7	10	
Kirk Furey	(Canada)	D	2002–2004	94	9	28	37	77	6	0	1	1	4	
Steve Gainey	(Canada)	LW	2003–2004	27	2	7	9	27	11	0	1	1	14	
Denis Gauthier	(Canada)	D	2007–2008	78	3	15	18	80	11	0	1	1	17	
Claude Giroux	(Canada)	RW	2006–2007; 2008–2009	38	18	18	36	11	–	–	–	–	–	
Triston Grant	(Canada)	LW	2005–2008	197	17	20	37	570	12	0	2	2	34	
Josh Gratton†	(Canada)	LW	2004–2006; 2008–2009	124	19	15	34	557	23	3	3	6	80	CC 2005
Kyle Greentree	(Canada)	LW	2006–2008	80	26	24	50	85	12	1	3	4	11	
Mark Greig	(Canada)	RW	1998–2003	348	140	232	372	548	27	10	16	26	30	Captain: 2001–2003
Martin Grenier	(Canada)	D	2006–2008	91	3	3	6	234	3	0	0	0	0	
Nate Guenin	(United States)	D	2006–2009	207	7	36	43	333	16	0	1	1	28	
Gino Guyer	(United States)	F	2005–2006	4	0	0	0	0	–	–	–	–	–	
David Harlock	(Canada)	D	2001–2003	70	2	22	24	97	5	0	1	1	4	
Josh Harrold	(United States)	D	2002–2003	3	0	1	1	2	–	–	–	–	–	
Paul Healey†	(Canada)	W	1996–1999	207	81	57	138	143	45	14	9	23	25	CC 1998
Matt Henderson	(United States)	LW	1999–2000	51	4	8	12	37	5	0	0	0	4	
Chris Heron	(Canada)	F	2000–2001	57	8	8	16	12	–	–	–	–	–	
Matt Herr	(United States)	C	2000–2001	11	2	4	6	18	9	2	1	3	8	
Patrik Hersley	(Sweden)	D	2008–2009	5	0	0	0	2	–	–	–	–	–	
Jamie Heward†	(Canada)	D	1997–1998	72	17	48	65	54	20	3	16	19	10	CC 1998
Russell Hewson	(Canada)	C	2000–2001	5	0	0	0	0	2	0	0	0	0	
Joey Hope	(United States)	D	2003–2006	102	3	8	11	74	9	0	1	1	6	
Petr Hubacek	(Czech Republic)	C	2000–2002	84	4	15	19	37	9	0	1	1	6	
Randy Jones†	(Canada)	D	2003–2006; 2008–2009	147	15	48	63	148	30	0	6	6	27	CC 2005
Lars Jonsson	(Sweden)	D	2006–2008	84	9	24	33	44	7	1	4	5	6	
Chris Joseph	(Canada)	D	1997–1999	57	11	32	43	28	16	3	10	13	8	
Patrik Juhlin	(Sweden)	LW	1996–1997	78	31	60	91	24	9	7	6	13	4	
Jon Kalinski	(Canada)	LW	2007–2009	51	10	10	20	54	14	2	4	7	18	
Boyd Kane†	(Canada)	LW	2003–2005; 2006–2009	246	49	85	134	461	49	5	13	18	98	Captain: 2003–2005; CC 2005; Captain: 2007–2009
Pat Kavanagh	(Canada)	RW	2005–2006	73	20	23	43	81	–	–	–	–	–	
Brent Kelly	(Canada)	C	2005–2006	74	16	23	39	39	–	–	–	–	–	
Mario Kempe	(Sweden)	RW	2008–2009	5	0	0	0	2	3	0	0	0	2	
Steven King	(United States)	RW	1996–1997	39	17	10	27	47	–	–	–	–	–	
Sergei Klimentiev	(Ukraine)	D	1998–1999	43	5	12	17	99	–	–	–	–	–	
Garrett Klotz	(Canada)	LW	2008–2009	36	0	1	1	59	–	–	–	–	–	
Greg Koehler	(Canada)	C	2001–2002	22	8	4	12	34	5	1	2	3	6	
Ladislav Kohn	(Czech Republic)	RW	2002–2003	15	4	7	11	2	–	–	–	–	–	
Dan Kordic	(Canada)	LW	1998–1999	9	1	1	2	43	1	0	0	0	0	
Frantisek Kucera	(Czech Republic)	D	1996–1997	9	1	5	6	2	10	1	6	7	20	
Kristian Kudroc	(Czech Republic)	D	2001–2002	10	0	3	3	14	5	1	1	2	21	
Lasse Kukkonen	(Finland)	D	2008–2009	26	0	11	11	20	4	2	0	2	6	
David Laliberte	(Canada)	RW	2007–2009	97	31	26	57	56	4	0	1	1	4	
Jeff Lank†	(Canada)	D	1996–2000	190	15	35	50	160	32	3	5	8	30	CC 1998
Claude Lapointe	(Canada)	C	2003–2004	2	1	1	2	0	–	–	–	–	–	
James Laux	(United States)	D	2003–2004	23	4	3	7	11	–	–	–	–	–	
Kirby Law	(Canada)	RW	1999–2004	309	100	122	222	563	32	3	11	14	30	
Guillaume Lefebvre	(Canada)	LW	2000–2003	125	26	21	47	224	14	0	1	1	6	
Mike Lephart	(United States)	W	2001–2003	118	16	16	32	41	5	0	1	1	0	
Francis Lessard	(Canada)	RW	1999–2002	202	7	21	28	997	15	0	1	1	40	
Dave MacIsaac†	(United States)	D	1996–1999	188	16	51	67	526	44	7	19	26	101	CC 1998; Captain: 1998–1999
Cail MacLean	(Canada)	RW	1999–2001	12	0	1	1	4	–	–	–	–	–	
Ian MacNeil	(Canada)	C	2002–2004	142	23	28	51	283	12	2	6	8	34	
Ken Magowan	(Canada)	LW	2005–2006	4	0	0	0	0	–	–	–	–	–	
Mike Maneluk†	(Canada)	LW	1997–1998; 1999–2000	139	74	75	149	220	24	14	23	37	34	CC 1998
Patrick Maroon	(United States)	LW	2007–2009	81	23	31	54	62	4	1	2	3	13	
Jon Matsumoto	(Canada)	C	2006–2009	171	51	60	111	139	16	3	4	7	14	
Chris McAllister	(Canada)	D	2002–2003	4	0	0	0	12	–	–	–	–	–	
Shawn McCosh†	(Canada)	C	1996–1999	197	66	130	196	255	30	9	22	31	37	CC 1998
Steve McLaren	(Canada)	LW	1998–2001	164	8	6	14	640	15	0	0	0	40	
Kiel McLeod	(Canada)	C	2005–2006	34	2	2	4	36	–	–	–	–	–	
Dean Melanson	(Canada)	D	1999–2001	73	12	29	41	226	4	2	3	5	10	
Eric Meloche†	(Canada)	RW	2004–2007	122	18	26	44	200	17	3	2	5	18	CC 2005
Freddy Meyer†	(United States)	D	2003–2006	129	23	26	49	143	33	3	12	15	42	CC 2005
Arpad Mihaly	(Romania)	RW	2000–2001	2	0	0	0	0	–	–	–	–	–	
Jeff Mitchell	(United States)	RW	1996–1997	31	7	5	12	103	10	1	1	2	20	
Andreas Moborg	(Sweden)	D	2001–2002	1	0	0	0	2	–	–	–	–	–	
Jim Montgomery†	(Canada)	C	1997–2000	159	51	110	161	186	36	17	27	44	75	CC 1998
Don Morrison	(Canada)	D	2006–2007	52	4	9	13	53	–	–	–	–	–	
Mark Murphy†	(United States)	W	1999–2000; 2003–2006	147	31	52	83	181	20	6	5	11	6	CC 2005
Marty Murray	(Canada)	C	2001–2002; 2006–2007	14	2	16	18	6	–	–	–	–	–	
Rob Murray	(Canada)	C	2000–2001	46	3	6	9	65	–	–	–	–	–	Captain: 2000–2001; AHLHOF 2017
Brantt Myhres	(Canada)	LW	1997–1998	18	4	4	8	67	–	–	–	–	–	
Petr Nedved	(Czech Republic)	LW	2006–2007	14	4	7	11	10	–	–	–	–	–	
Andreas Nodl	(Austria)	RW	2007–2009	42	7	14	21	20	14	1	1	2	4	
Clayton Norris	(Canada)	RW	1996–1997	1	0	0	0	17	–	–	–	–	–	
Sean O'Brien†	(United States)	LW	1997–2000	112	14	23	37	287	41	7	6	13	74	CC 1998
Ryan Parent	(Canada)	D	2006–2009	74	2	8	10	64	–	–	–	–	–	
Richard Park	(United States)	C	1998–1999	75	41	42	83	33	16	9	6	15	4	
Rastislav Pavlikovsky	(Slovakia)	C	1999–2000	12	4	7	11	8	–	–	–	–	–	
Andre Payette†	(Canada)	LW	1997–1999	68	5	6	11	243	4	0	0	0	9	CC 1998
Mike Peluso	(United States)	RW	2003–2004	72	13	18	31	87	5	0	1	1	4	
Randy Perry	(Canada)	D	2001–2002	3	0	1	1	0	–	–	–	–	–	
Dan Peters	(United States)	D	2000–2003	180	9	30	39	210	11	1	5	6	10	
Alexandre Picard†	(Canada)	D	2004–2008	134	16	58	74	115	2	0	0	0	0	CC 2005
Michel Picard	(Canada)	LW	2000–2001	72	31	39	70	22	10	4	5	9	4	AHLHOF 2025
Gino Pisellini	(United States)	RW	2006–2007	32	1	1	2	53	–	–	–	–	–	
Joni Pitkanen†	(Finland)	D	2004–2005	76	6	35	41	105	21	3	4	7	16	CC 2005
Derek Plante	(United States)	C	2000–2001	57	18	35	53	19	–	–	–	–	–	
Vaclav Pletka	(Czech Republic)	LW	2000–2002	132	40	40	80	94	10	1	3	4	4	
Ryan Potulny	(United States)	C	2006–2008	88	33	40	73	85	12	3	5	8	10	
Darroll Powe	(Canada)	C	2006–2009	95	15	19	34	173	10	1	0	1	6	
David Printz†	(Sweden)	D	2004–2007	192	11	31	42	274	1	0	0	0	0	CC 2005
Vaclav Prospal	(Czech Republic)	LW	1996–1997	63	32	63	95	70	–	–	–	–	–	
Nate Raduns	(United States)	C	2008–2009	70	5	9	14	71	3	0	0	0	2	
Tim Ramholt	(Switzerland)	D	2008–2009	7	0	0	0	2	–	–	–	–	–	
Mike Ratchuk	(United States)	D	2007–2009	80	6	14	20	46	9	0	2	2	2	
Ryan Ready†	(Canada)	LW	2004–2006	112	14	28	42	171	19	2	11	13	6	CC 2005
Darren Reid	(Canada)	RW	2006–2008	84	24	27	51	57	9	1	2	3	0	
Mike Richards†	(Canada)	C	2004–2005	–	–	–	–	–	14	7	8	15	28	CC 2005
Troy Riddle	(United States)	C	2006–2007	3	0	0	0	0	–	–	–	–	–	
Sean Ritchlin	(United States)	RW	2000–2001	11	2	0	2	6	–	–	–	–	–	
Brent Robinson	(Canada)	F	2004–2005	5	0	1	1	0	–	–	–	–	–	
Jared Ross	(United States)	C	2006–2009	152	56	89	145	88	12	5	4	9	4	
Rosario Ruggeri	(Canada)	D	2004–2007	22	0	2	2	2	–	–	–	–	–	
Darren Rumble	(Canada)	D	1996–1997	72	18	44	62	83	7	0	3	3	19	
Stefan Ruzicka	(Slovakia)	RW	2003–2004; 2005–2008	166	51	74	125	222	15	5	9	14	32	
Billy Ryan	(United States)	C	2008–2009	15	0	0	0	2	–	–	–	–	–	
Joe Sacco	(United States)	RW	2002–2003	6	4	3	7	4	–	–	–	–	–	
Yves Sarault	(Canada)	LW	2001–2002	7	0	2	2	9	5	0	0	0	6	
Andre Savage	(Canada)	C	2002–2004	72	12	31	43	78	–	–	–	–	–	
Luca Sbisa	(Switzerland)	D	2008–2009	2	1	1	2	2	–	–	–	–	–	
Dennis Seidenberg†	(Germany)	D	2002–2005	131	25	46	71	95	27	4	10	14	23	CC 2005
Patrick Sharp†	(Canada)	C	2002–2005	163	52	62	114	164	22	10	13	23	20	CC 2005
Mike Siklenka	(Canada)	D	2002–2004	82	7	11	18	198	–	–	–	–	–	
Jon Sim†	(Canada)	LW	2004–2005	63	35	26	61	66	21	10	7	17	44	CC 2005
Rob Sirianni	(Canada)	RW	2008–2009	49	13	12	25	32	4	0	0	0	2	
Jarrod Skalde	(Canada)	C	2001–2002	16	4	4	8	23	4	0	2	2	4	
Wade Skolney†	(Canada)	D	2002–2006	215	3	28	31	509	23	0	1	1	66	CC 2005
Sergei Skrobot	(Russia)	D	1999–2001	10	0	1	1	2	–	–	–	–	–	
John Slaney†	(Canada)	D	2000–2007	415	85	208	293	228	48	10	18	28	24	CC 2005; Captain: 2005–2007; AHLHOF 2014
David Sloane	(United States)	D	2008–2009	1	0	0	0	2	–	–	–	–	–	
Jeff Smith	(Canada)	LW	2002–2005	57	2	4	6	138	–	–	–	–	–	
Radovan Somik	(Slovakia)	LW	2003–2004	1	0	0	0	2	–	–	–	–	–	
Alain St. Hilaire	(Canada)	C	2001–2002	2	0	0	0	0	–	–	–	–	–	
Bruno St. Jacques	(Canada)	D	1999–2003	133	4	35	39	188	15	1	0	1	16	
Ben Stafford†	(United States)	C	2001–2005	234	39	55	94	106	33	3	3	6	6	CC 2005
Jeff Staples†	(Canada)	D	1996–1998	137	8	27	35	344	27	0	2	2	33	CC 1998
John Stevens†	(Canada)	D	1996–1999	149	3	28	31	211	30	0	8	8	52	Captain: 1996–1998; CC 1998; PHOF 2007; AHLHOF 2012
P. J. Stock	(Canada)	LW	2000–2001; 2003–2004	75	6	20	26	244	12	0	2	2	34	
Danny Syvret	(Canada)	D	2008–2009	76	12	45	57	44	4	0	1	1	0	
Jeff Szwez	(Canada)	RW	2008–2009	69	12	6	18	84	4	0	1	1	2	
Brad Tapper	(Canada)	RW	2006–2007	5	3	1	4	4	–	–	–	–	–	
Chris Therien	(Canada)	D	2003–2004	2	0	0	0	0	–	–	–	–	–	
Brad Tiley	(Canada)	D	2000–2003	191	25	62	87	52	10	1	2	3	2	
Jussi Timonen	(Finland)	D	2006–2008	60	2	22	24	32	–	–	–	–	–	
Denis Tolpeko	(Russia)	C	2006–2008	82	19	28	47	84	–	–	–	–	–	
Jeff Tory	(Canada)	D	1999–2000	76	17	41	58	44	5	1	3	4	4	
Chase Trull	(Canada)	LW	2008–2009	4	0	0	0	5	–	–	–	–	–	
R. J. Umberger†	(United States)	C	2004–2006	88	24	51	75	44	21	3	7	10	12	CC 2005
James van Riemsdyk	(United States)	LW	2008–2009	7	1	1	2	2	4	0	0	0	2	
Travis Van Tighem†	(Canada)	D	1997–1998	31	0	1	1	46	2	0	0	0	15	CC 1998
Jim Vandermeer	(Canada)	D	2001–2004	148	6	27	33	330	13	0	3	3	23	
Pete Vandermeer	(Canada)	LW	2001–2004	209	15	17	32	1046	17	1	0	1	37	
Tony Voce†	(United States)	LW	2004–2007	181	58	57	115	216	4	0	0	0	4	CC 2005
Roman Vopat	(Czech Republic)	C	1999–2000	12	1	0	1	12	–	–	–	–	–	
Steve Washburn	(Canada)	C	1999–2001	107	31	68	99	145	7	0	2	2	10	
Mike Watt	(Canada)	LW	2001–2002	53	11	13	24	38	5	2	1	3	6	
Brian Wesenberg†	(Canada)	RW	1996–2000	167	43	47	90	306	35	6	7	13	62	CC 1998
Kam White	(Canada)	D	1999–2000; 2001–2003	5	0	0	0	20	–	–	–	–	–	
Peter White†	(Canada)	C	1996–2000; 2002–2005	431	153	319	472	175	58	21	31	52	34	CC 1998; Captain: 1999–2000; PHOF 2009; AHLHOF 2013
Todd White	(Canada)	C	1999–2000	32	19	24	43	12	5	2	1	3	8	
Stephen Wood	(United States)	D	2003–2006	56	2	11	13	36	–	–	–	–	–	
Martin Woods	(Canada)	D	1996–1997	1	0	0	0	0	–	–	–	–	–	
Jeff Woywitka	(Canada)	D	2003–2004	29	0	6	6	51	–	–	–	–	–	
Jamie Wright	(Canada)	LW	2002–2003	33	10	14	24	31	–	–	–	–	–	
Chris Zarb	(United States)	D	2008–2009	4	0	0	0	4	–	–	–	–	–	
Jason Zent	(United States)	LW	1998–2000	75	13	13	26	104	16	2	4	6	22	
Pete Zingoni	(United States)	C	2006–2008	128	38	27	65	156	11	3	2	5	8	
Matt Zultek	(Canada)	LW	2000–2003	29	1	4	5	8	10	0	1	1	8	

== Gallery ==
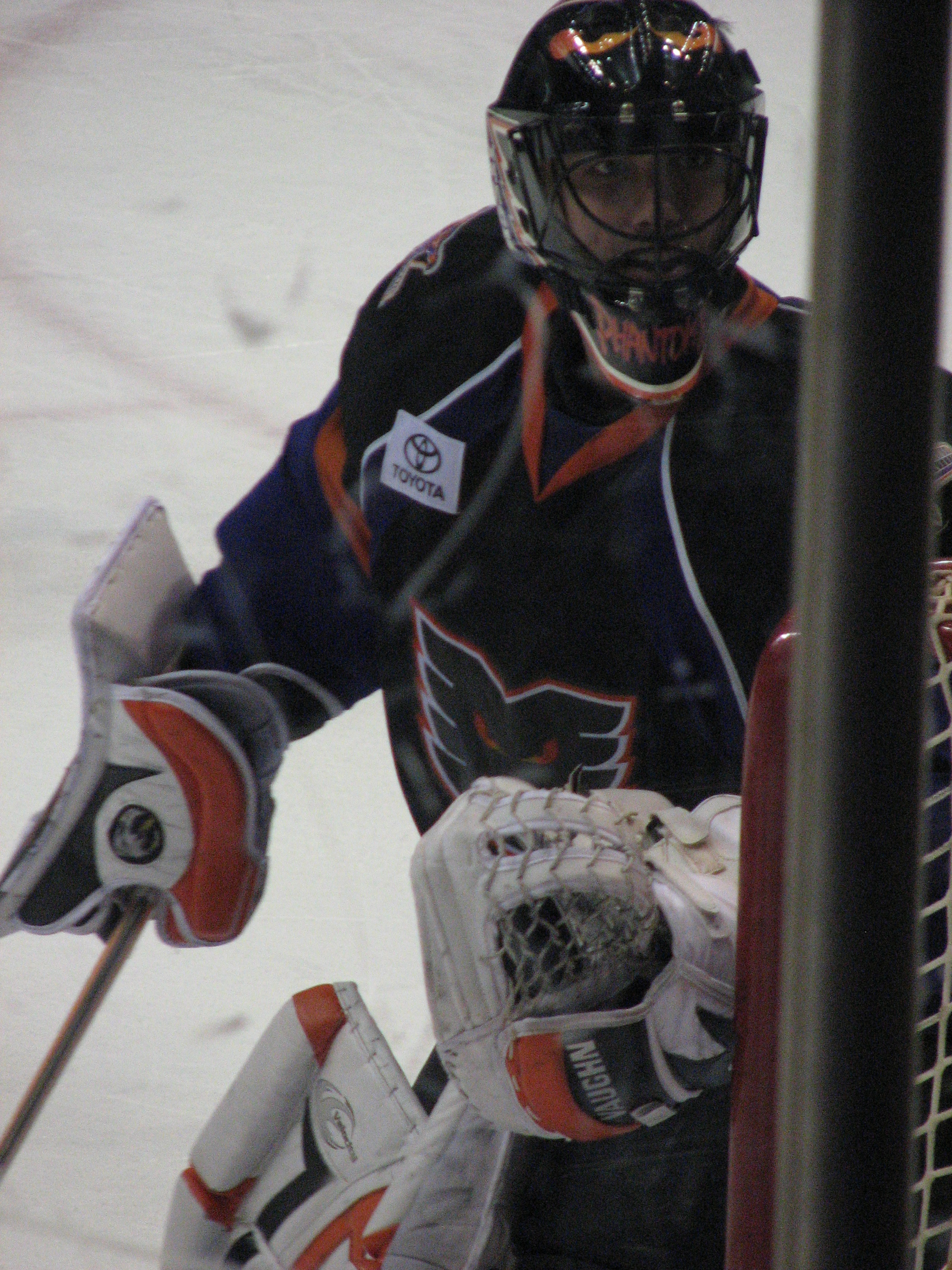
Brian Boucher played four seasons for the Phantoms.

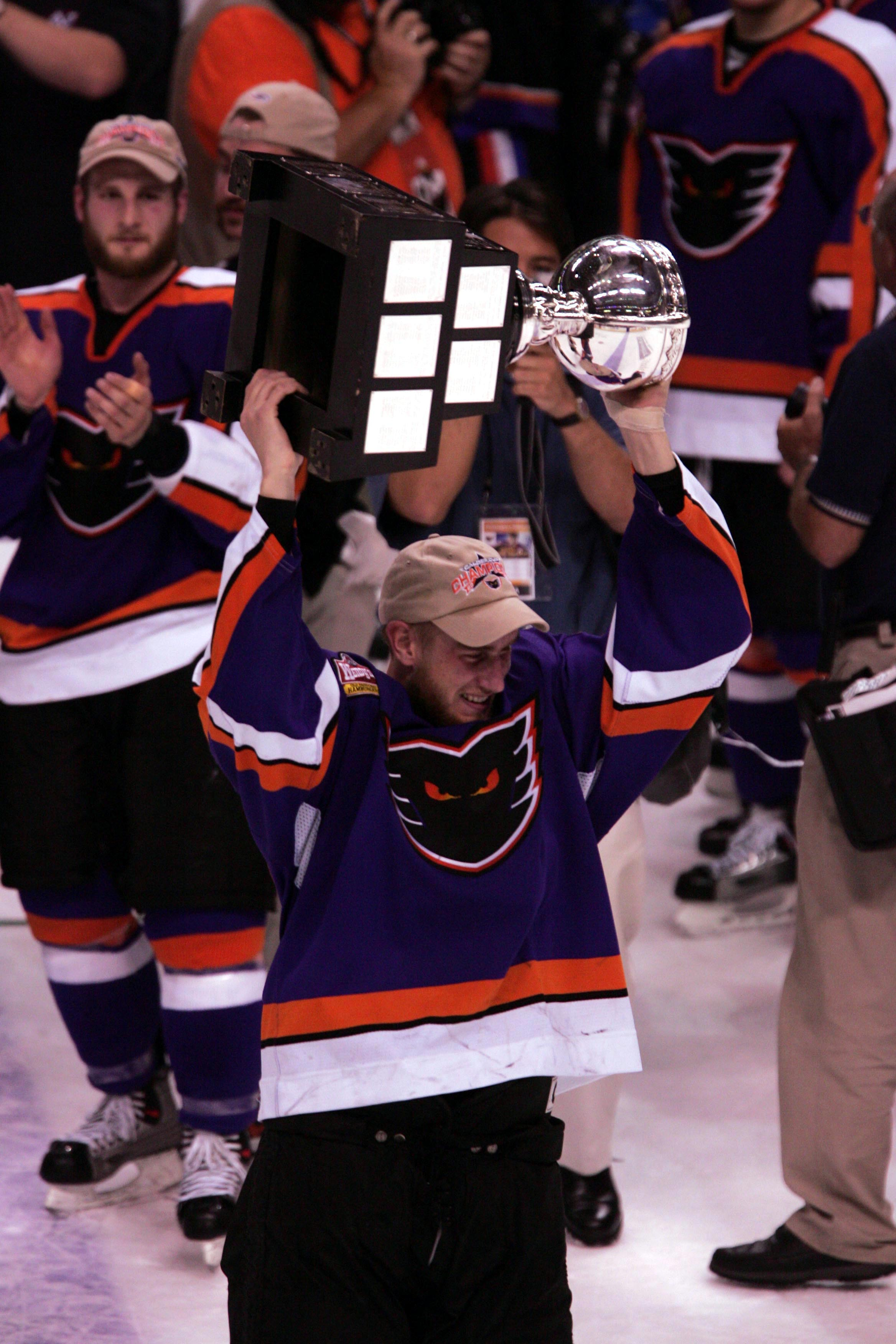
Jeff Carter played two seasons for the Phantoms.

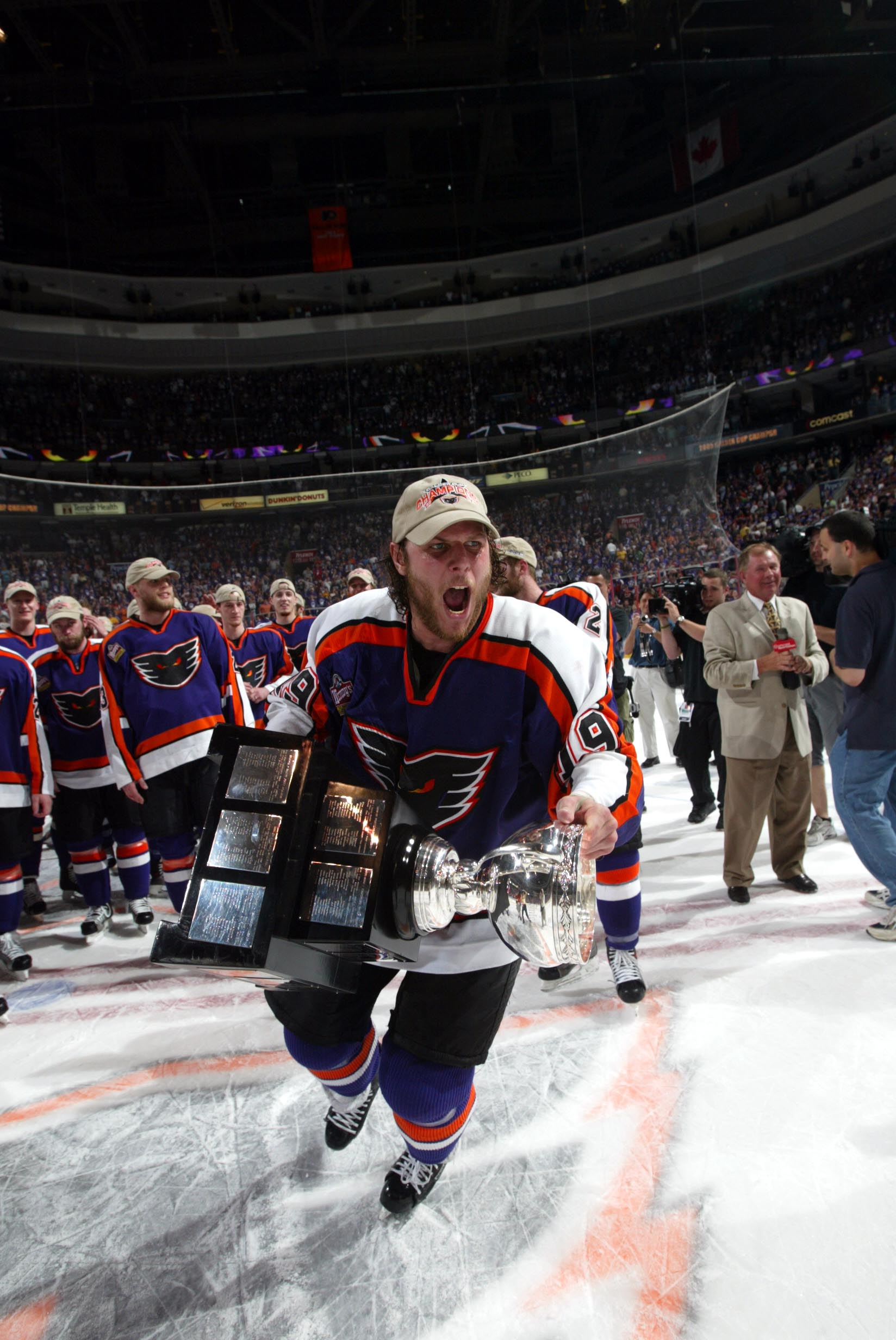
Riley Cote played three seasons for the Phantoms.

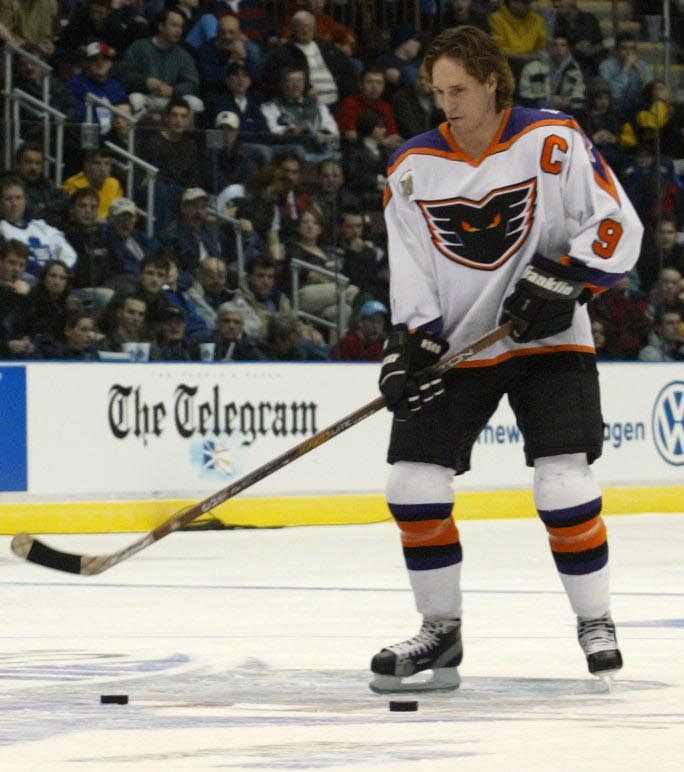
Mark Greig played five seasons for the Phantoms.

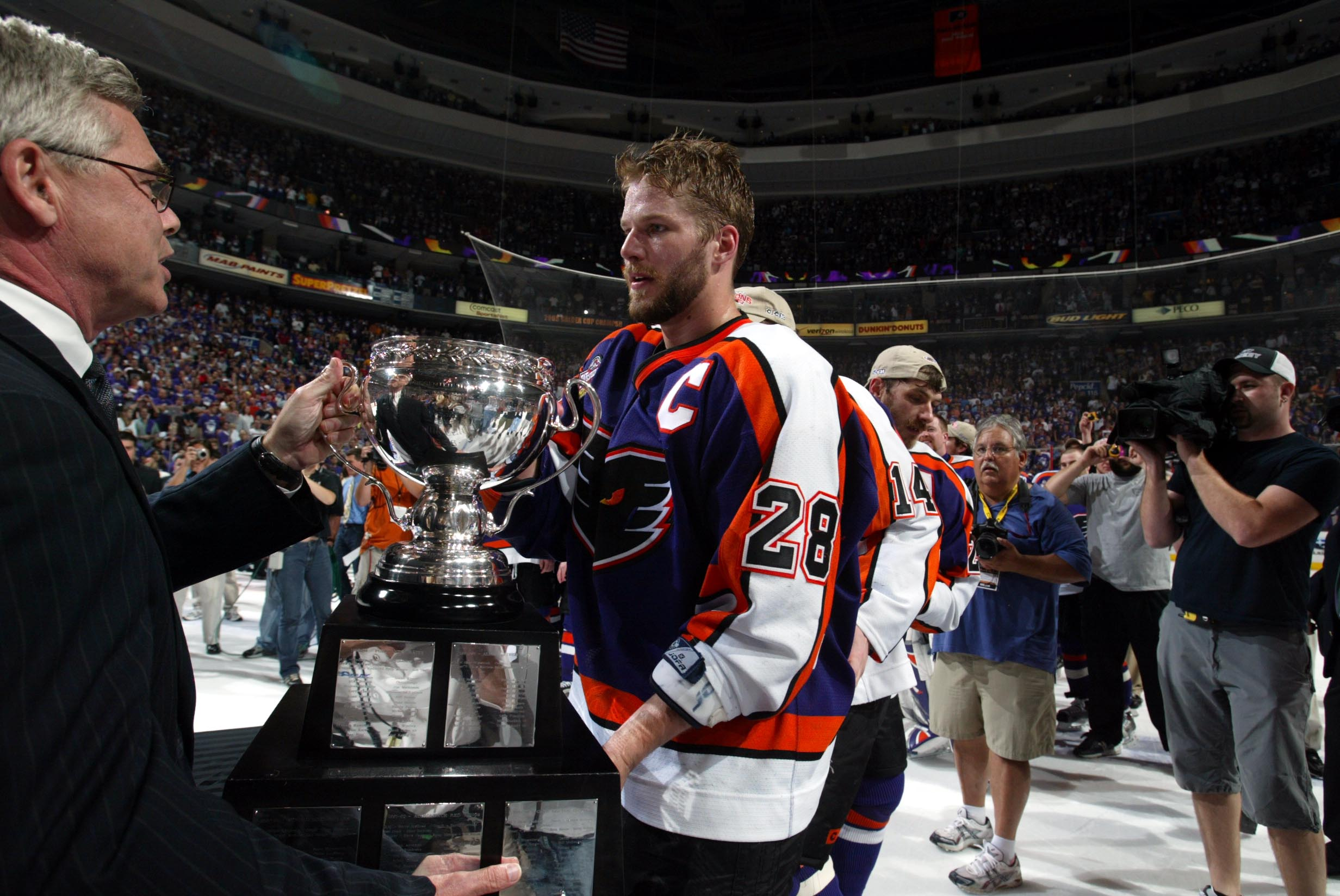
Boyd Kane was team captain for four of his five seasons with the Phantoms.

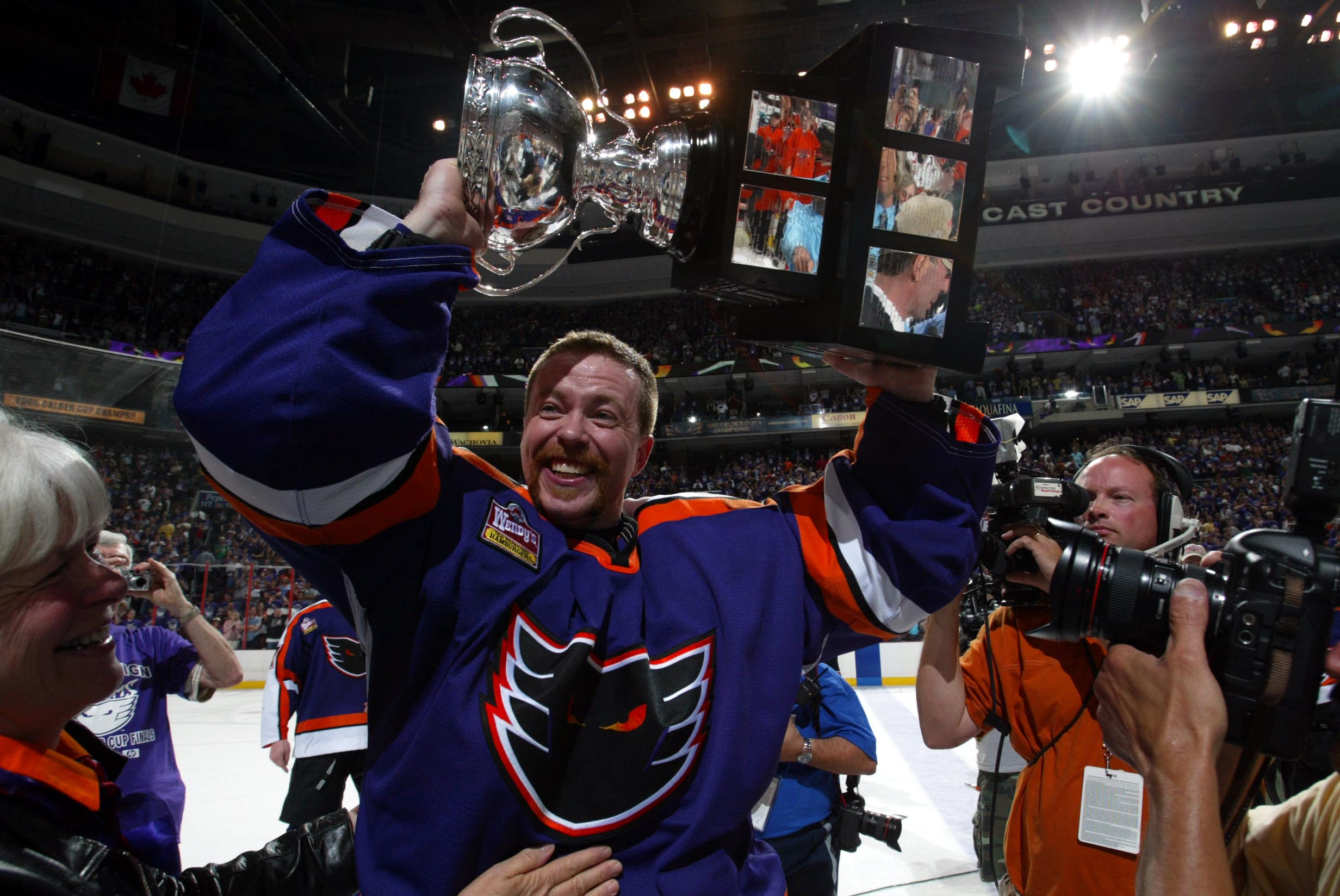
Neil Little played eight seasons for the Phantoms.

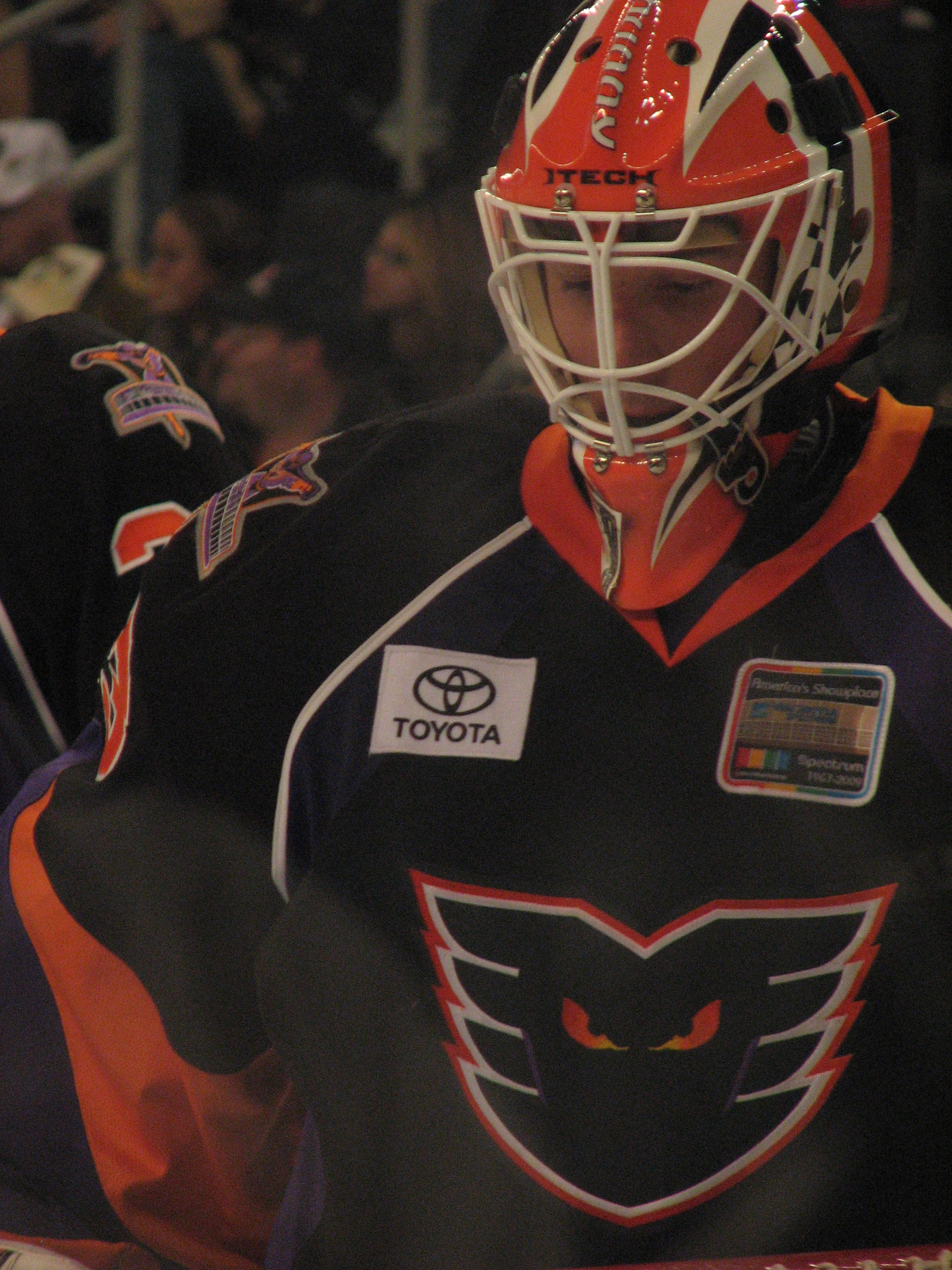
Scott Munroe played four seasons for the Phantoms.

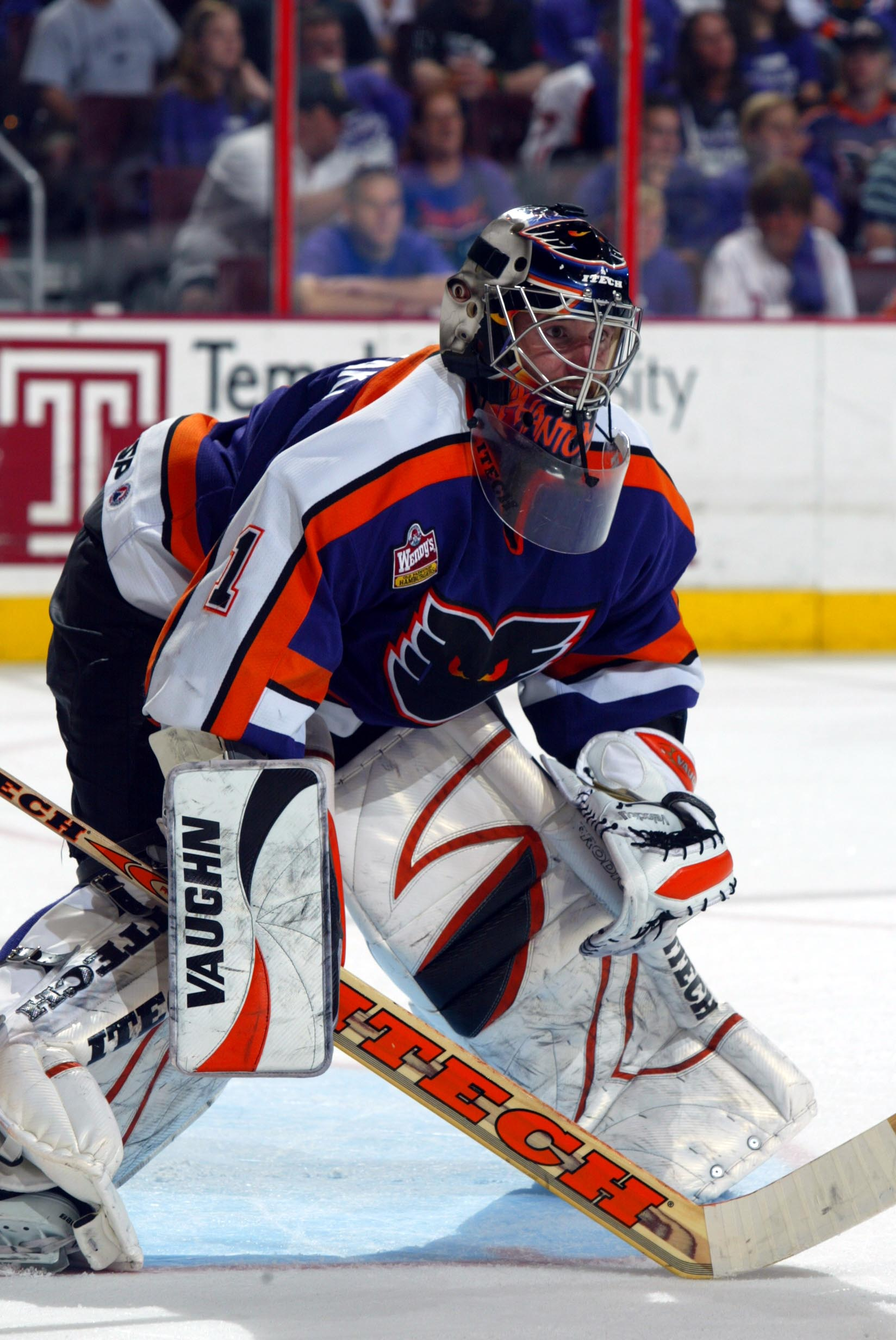
Antero Niittymaki played three seasons for the Phantoms.

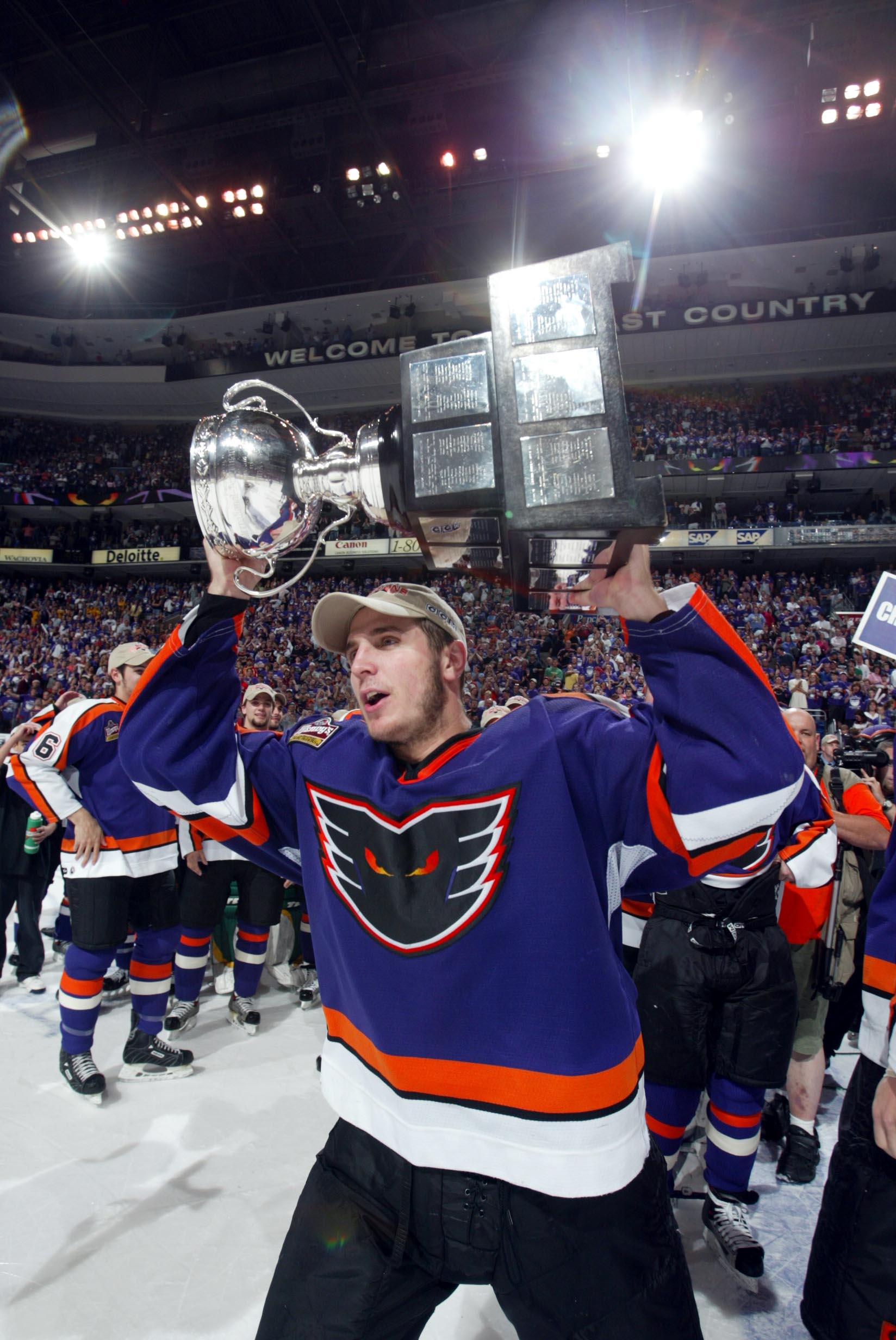
Mike Richards played one season for the Phantoms.

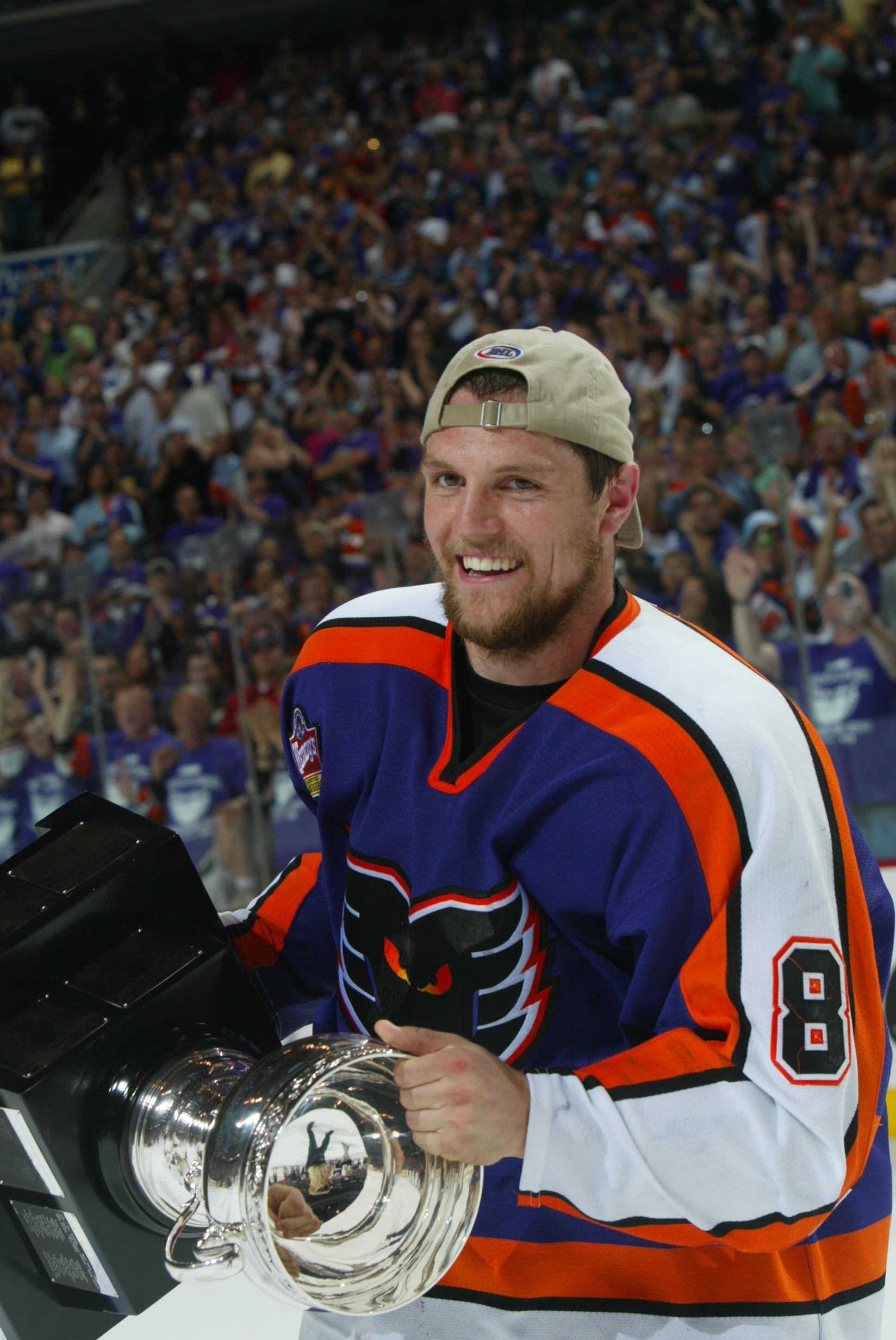
Dennis Seidenberg played three seasons for the Phantoms.

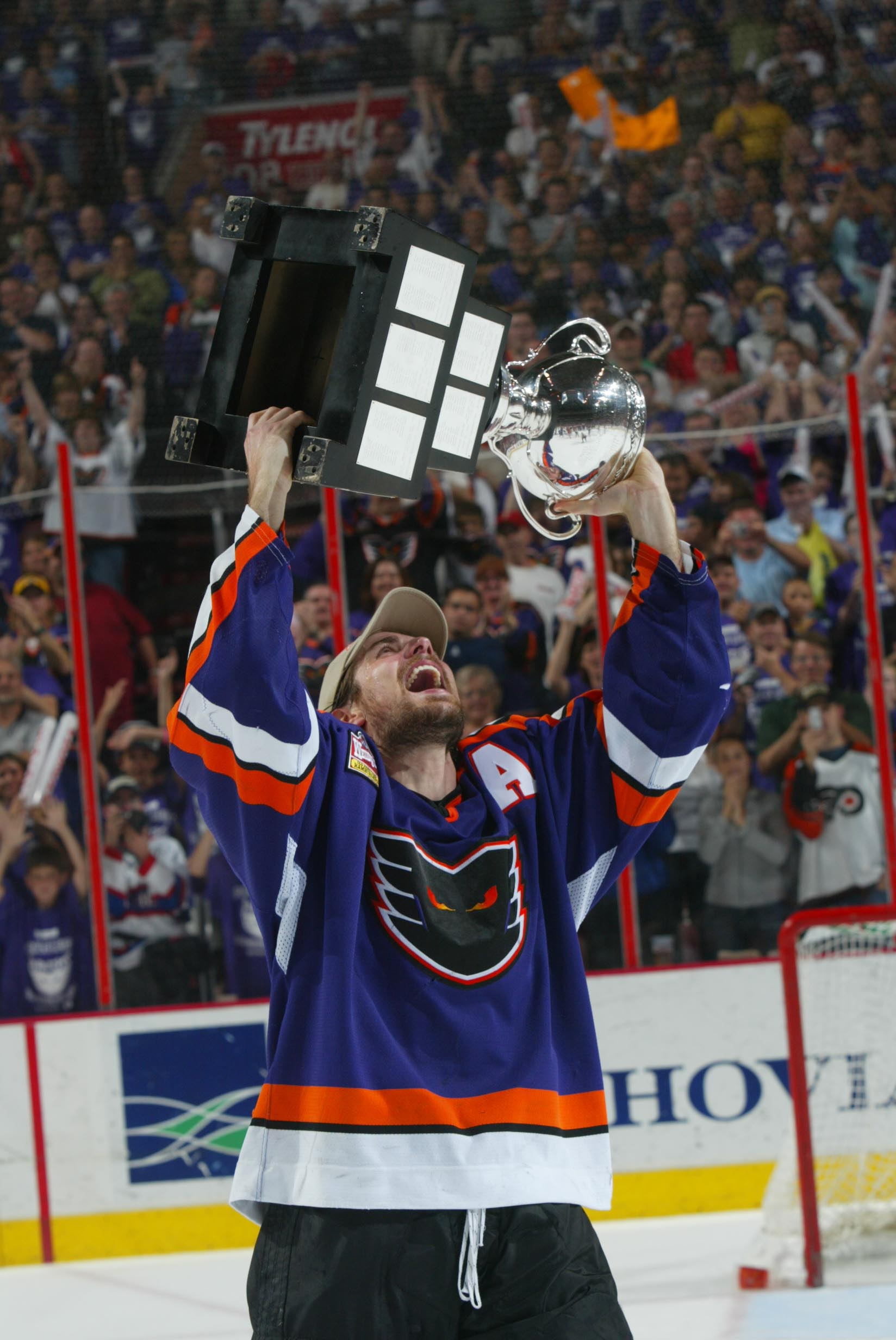
Patrick Sharp played three seasons for the Phantoms.

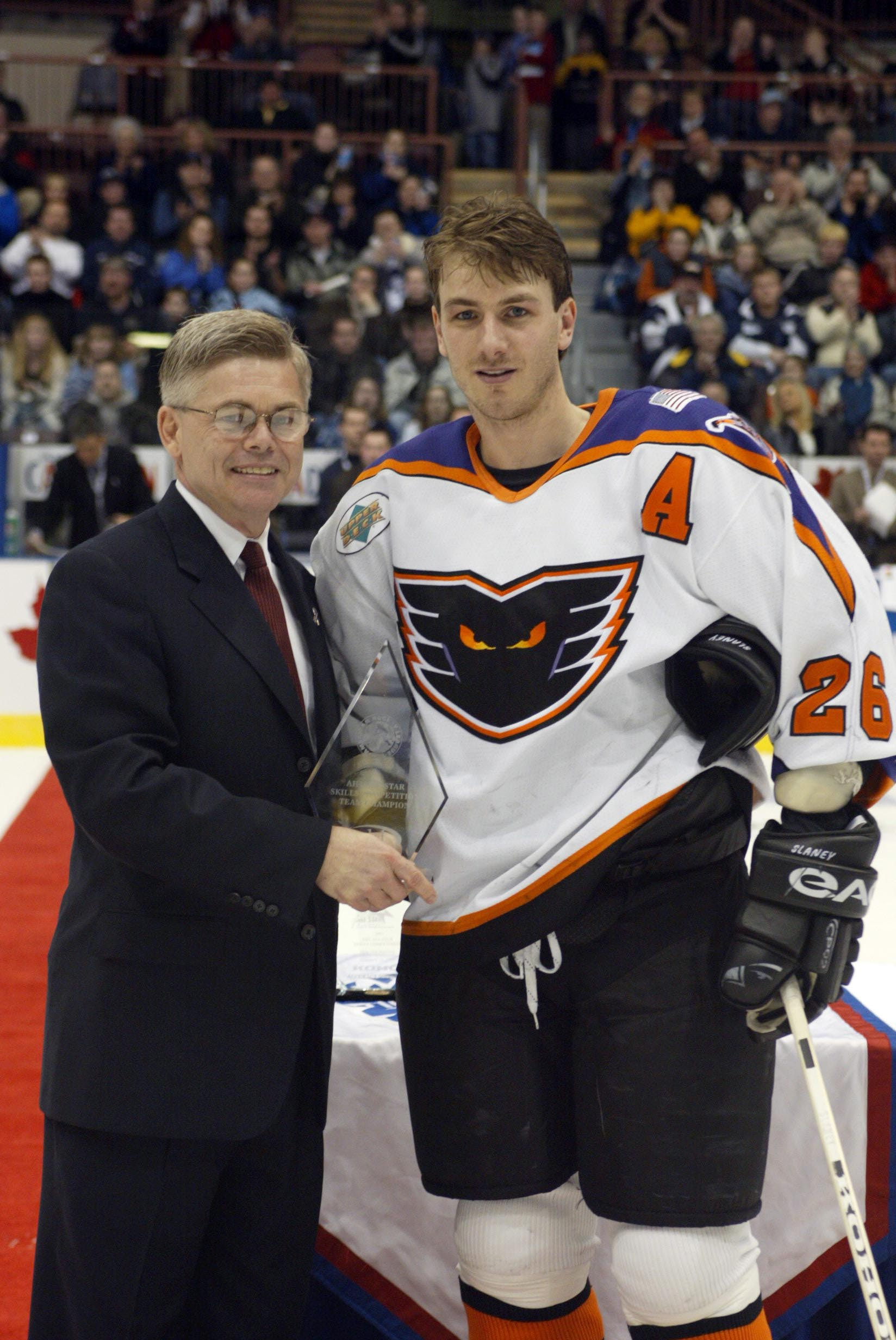
John Slaney played seven seasons for the Phantoms.

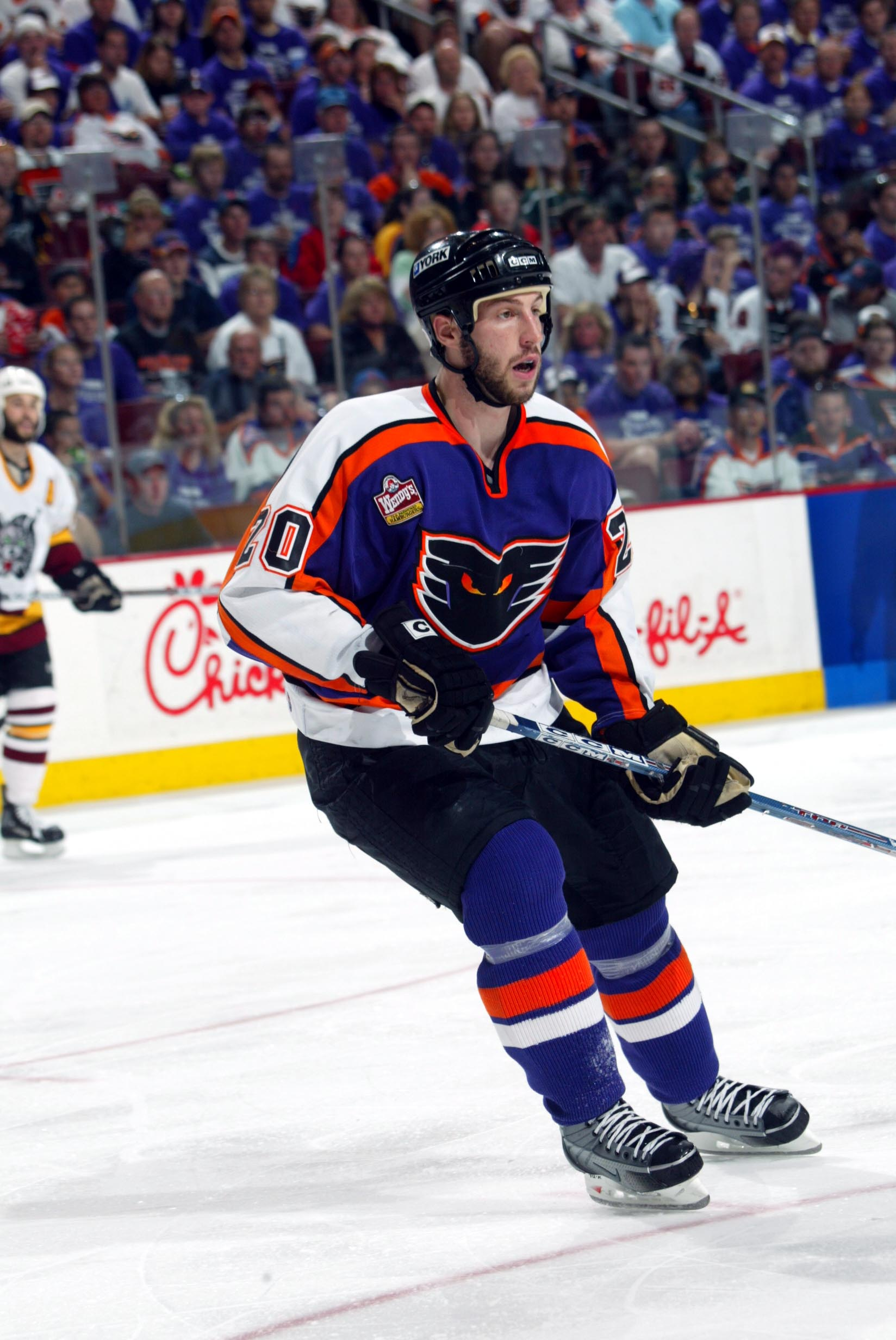
R. J. Umberger played two seasons for the Phantoms.

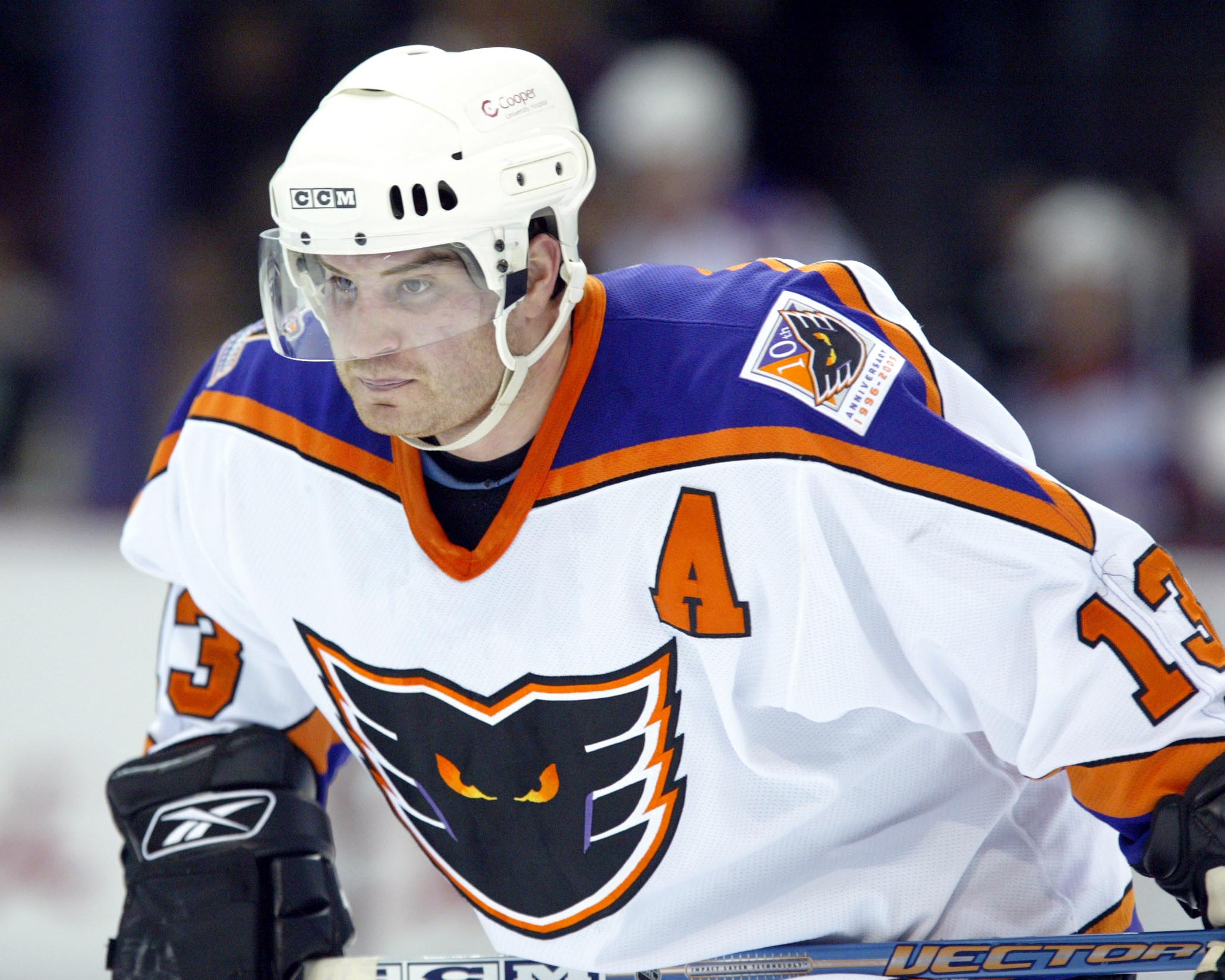
Philadelphia-native Tony Voce played three seasons for the Phantoms.

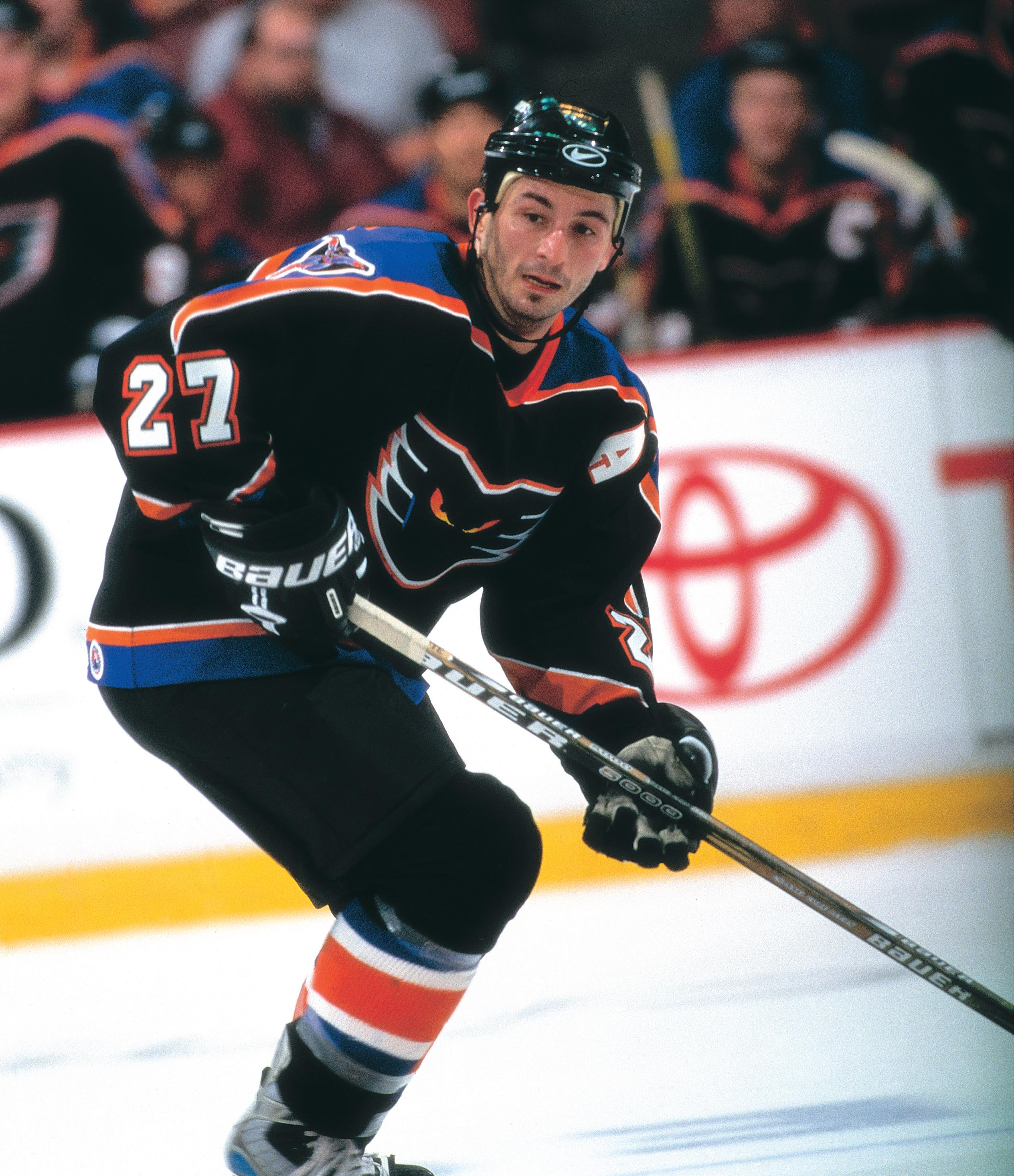
Peter White is the team’s all-time leader in games played, goals, assists, and points.

== See also ==
- List of Adirondack Phantoms players
- List of Lehigh Valley Phantoms players

== Notes ==
- ^{a} Beginning in the 2004–05 season, ties are no longer possible.
- ^{b} The nationality column lists the player's national team or country of birth if the player has never competed internationally. The player's national team is listed if it differs from their country of birth. For example, Richard Park was born in South Korea but played for the United States internationally. His nationality is listed as United States.
- ^{c} The seasons column lists the first year of the season of the player's first game and the last year of the season of the player's last game. For example, a player who played one game in the 1999–2000 season would be listed as playing with the team from 1999 to 2000, regardless of what calendar year the game occurred within.
