= Denis Tolpeko =

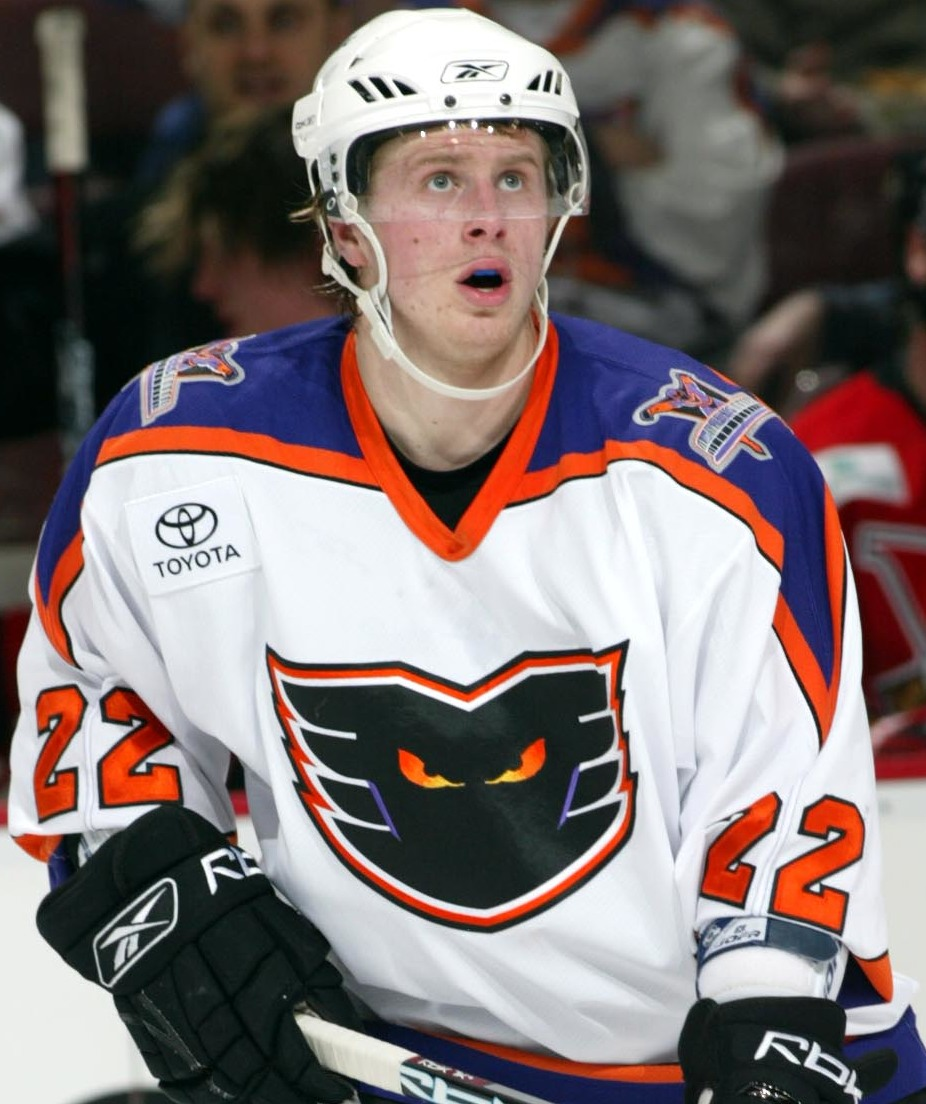
- Tolpeko with the Philadelphia Phantoms in 2007
- Born: January 29, 1985 (age 41) Moscow, Russian SFSR, Soviet Union
- Height: 6 ft 1 in (185 cm)
- Weight: 190 lb (86 kg; 13 st 8 lb)
- Position: Left wing
- Shot: Left
- Played for: Philadelphia Flyers; Dynamo Moscow; Neftekhimik Nizhnekamsk; Salavat Yulaev Ufa; Torpedo Nizhny Novgorod; Amur Khabarovsk; HC Sochi; Spartak Moscow
- NHL draft: Undrafted
- Playing career: 2002–2017

Denis Andreevich Tolpeko (Russian: Денис Андреевич Толпеко; born January 29, 1985) is a Russian former professional ice hockey centre. He most recently played for HC Spartak Moscow of the Kontinental Hockey League (KHL).

== Playing career ==
As a youth, Tolpeko played in the 1999 Quebec International Pee-Wee Hockey Tournament with a team from Moscow.

Tolpeko was signed as an undrafted free agent by the Philadelphia Flyers on July 5, 2006. He made his NHL debut with the Flyers on October 4, 2007 against the Calgary Flames. A month later on November 15, Tolpeko scored his first NHL goal against the New York Rangers on goaltender Henrik Lundqvist. Following the season, Tolpeko signed with Dynamo Moscow on May 29, 2008.

In the off-season prior to the 2015–16 campaign, Tolpeko was traded by Salavat Yulaev Ufa to Torpedo Nizhny Novgorod on July 31, 2015. In his first season with Torpedo, Tolpeko lasted just 5 games with the club, before he was again traded to his fifth top-flight Russian club, Amur Khabarovsk on October 1, 2015.

== Career statistics ==
			Regular season					Playoffs
Season	Team	League	GP	G	A	Pts	PIM	GP	G	A	Pts	PIM
2002–03	Vityaz Podolsk	Rus.2	22	1	2	3	6	—	—	—	—	—
2003–04	Seattle Thunderbirds	WHL	72	13	16	29	63	—	—	—	—	—
2004–05	Seattle Thunderbirds	WHL	54	13	18	31	48	12	1	0	1	10
2005–06	Regina Pats	WHL	53	20	31	51	66	6	0	4	4	16
2006–07	Philadelphia Phantoms	AHL	58	11	19	30	58	—	—	—	—	—
2007–08	Philadelphia Phantoms	AHL	24	8	9	17	26	—	—	—	—	—
2007–08	Philadelphia Flyers	NHL	26	1	5	6	24	—	—	—	—	—
2008–09	Dynamo Moscow	KHL	42	3	13	16	42	11	2	1	3	36
2009–10	Dynamo Moscow	KHL	24	2	2	4	32	3	0	0	0	2
2010–11	Dynamo Moscow	KHL	33	8	7	15	26	—	—	—	—	—
2011–12	Dynamo Moscow	KHL	35	6	4	10	33	9	0	2	2	6
2012–13	Dynamo Moscow	KHL	27	5	5	10	27	1	0	0	0	0
2012–13	Dynamo Balashikha	VHL	3	3	0	3	2	—	—	—	—	—
2013–14	Neftekhimik Nizhnekamsk	KHL	38	5	5	10	30	—	—	—	—	—
2013–14	Salavat Yulaev Ufa	KHL	7	0	1	1	0	4	0	2	2	14
2014–15	Salavat Yulaev Ufa	KHL	54	10	8	18	36	5	0	0	0	2
2015–16	Torpedo Nizhny Novgorod	KHL	5	0	0	0	2	—	—	—	—	—
2015–16	Amur Khabarovsk	KHL	35	4	6	10	15	—	—	—	—	—
2016–17	HC Sochi	KHL	31	2	5	7	16	—	—	—	—	—
2016–17	Spartak Moscow	KHL	15	2	1	3	33	—	—	—	—	—
2017–18	Spartak Moscow	KHL	4	0	1	1	4	—	—	—	—	—
NHL totals			26	1	5	6	24	—	—	—	—	—
KHL totals			350	47	58	105	296	33	2	5	7	60
