= Ben Stafford =

American ice hockey player

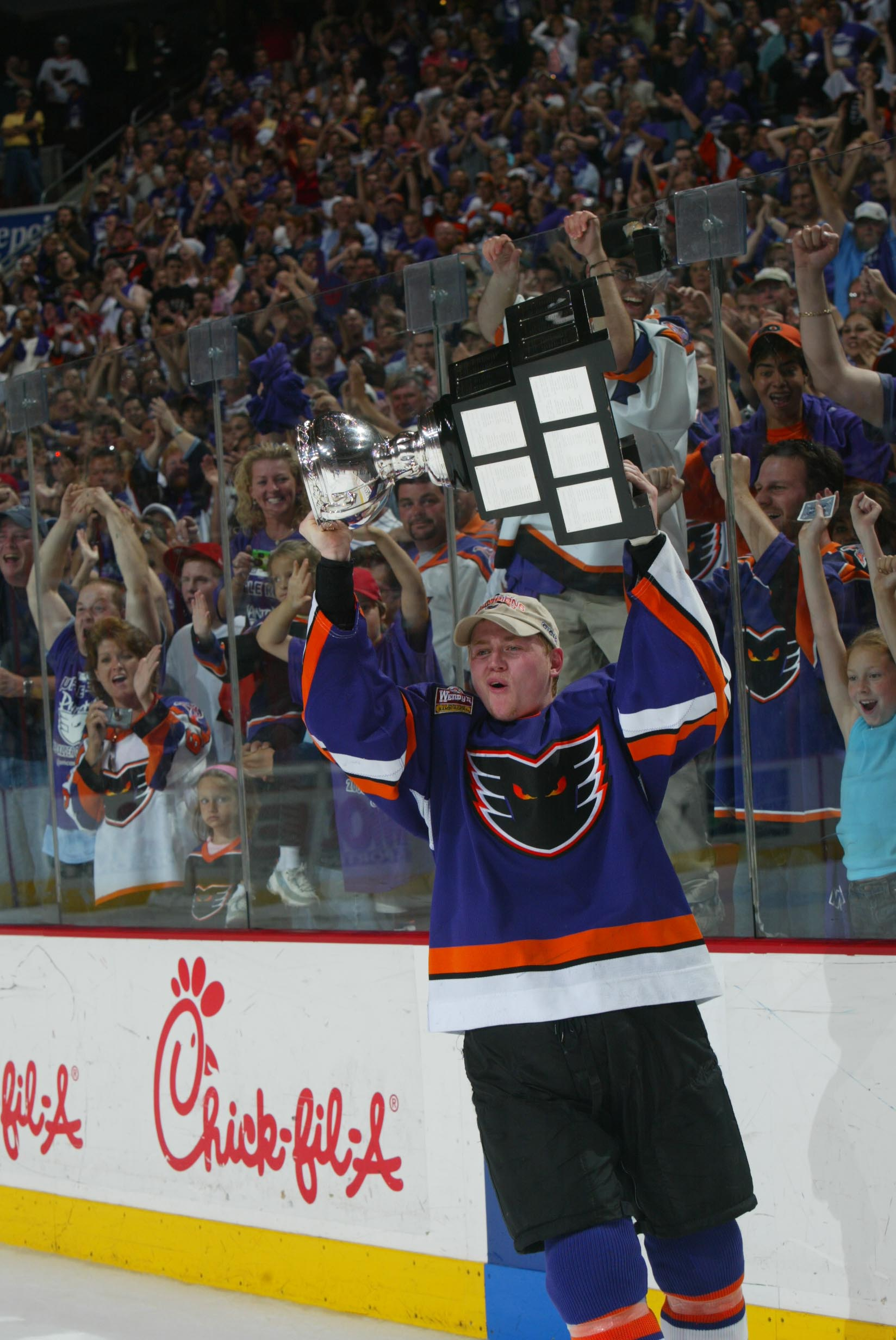
- Stafford with the Calder Cup in 2005.
- Born: December 18, 1978 (age 46) Edina, Minnesota, U.S.
- Height: 5 ft 11 in (180 cm)
- Weight: 185 lb (84 kg; 13 st 3 lb)
- Position: Center
- Shot: Right
- Played for: AHL; Philadelphia Phantoms; Saint John Flames; Providence Bruins; ECHL; Trenton Titans
- NHL draft: Undrafted
- Playing career: 2001–2005

Ben Stafford (born December 18, 1978) is an American former professional ice hockey player. Over four seasons, Stafford played 259 regular season games and 35 playoff games in the American Hockey League before retiring from hockey to join the United States Marine Corps.

Prior to turning professional, Stafford attended Yale University, where he played four seasons of NCAA Division I college hockey with the Yale Bulldogs men's ice hockey team.

== Awards and honors ==
Award	Year
ECHL All-Rookie Team	2001–02
ECHL Sportmanship Award	2001–02
AHL Man of the Year	2004–05
