= Neil Little =

Canadian ice hockey player

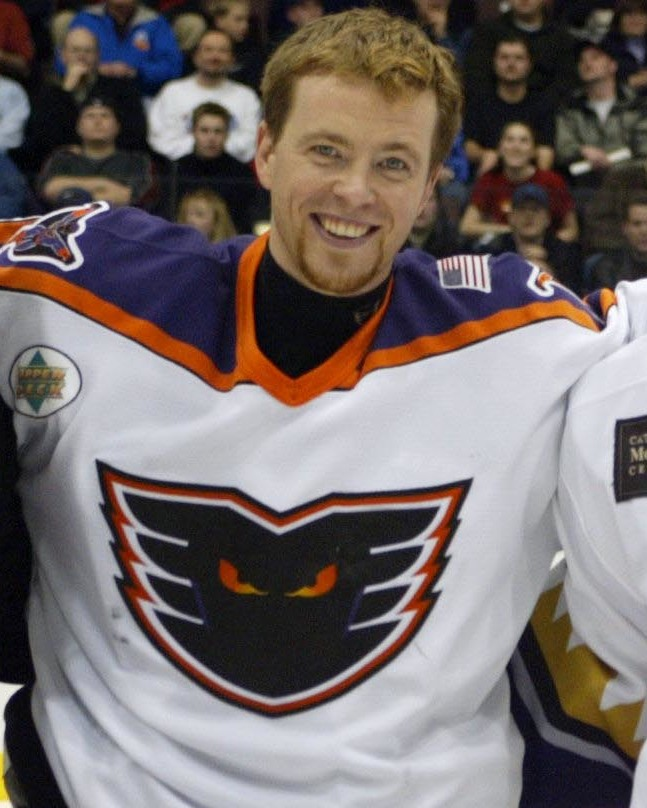
- Neil in 2002
- Born: December 18, 1971 (age 54) Medicine Hat, Alberta, Canada
- Height: 6 ft 1 in (185 cm)
- Weight: 190 lb (86 kg; 13 st 8 lb)
- Position: Goaltender
- Caught: Left
- Played for: NHL; Philadelphia Flyers; AHL; Hershey Bears; Philadelphia Phantoms; IHL; Grand Rapids Griffins; ECHL; Johnstown Chiefs; SM-liiga; Espoo Blues
- NHL draft: 226th overall, 1991; Philadelphia Flyers
- Playing career: 1994–2006

Leslie Neil Little, Jr. (born December 18, 1971) is a Canadian former professional ice hockey goaltender. He was a member of the Philadelphia Flyers organization nearly his entire professional career, helping backstop the Philadelphia Phantoms to two Calder Cup championships and playing in two career National Hockey League (NHL) games with the Flyers. Until 2015, he was an amateur scout for the Flyers. He is now a scout for the NHL Montreal Canadiens.

== Playing career ==
Little played 4 seasons for R.P.I. (NCAA Div 1, ECAC) before starting a professional career.

Little has played for the Hershey Bears and Philadelphia Phantoms in the AHL, as well as playing two NHL games for the Philadelphia Flyers. He signed with the Espoo Blues in the Finnish SM-liiga for the 2005–06 season, played there until Christmas, then finished the season in Geneva, Switzerland.

On December 28, 2003, he was the "flying goalie" in a brawl between the Phantoms and the Binghamton Senators as several players from the two teams were fighting next to the Senators' net, Little skated across the rink and dove into the crowd.

Despite only playing two career games with the Philadelphia Flyers, Little was named as one of the Flyers goaltenders for the 2012 NHL Winter Classic Alumni game.

Little is also the founder of ProHockeyLaunch.com which is an evaluation and mentorship company for up-and-coming young hockey players.

== Coaching career ==
Following his playing career, Little was named an assistant coach/goaltending development coach for the Philadelphia Phantoms as well as a global scout for the Philadelphia Flyers, concentrating his focus on goaltenders. He spent eight seasons with the Flyers organization before spending six seasons working with the Florida Panthers. Little spent the 2021–22 season working for the independent scouting firm Team 33 and was hired in the fall of 2022 by the Montreal Canadiens as a scout.

Little was the assistant coach for the Princeton University men's hockey team from 2007–08 to the 2010–11 seasons.

== Personal life ==
Little married Catherine M. Foote, DMD of Ardmore, PA in July 2013. He has four children, Nicholas, Elsie, Graysen, and Piper.

== Awards and honours ==
Award	Year
All-ECAC Hockey Rookie Team	1990–91
All-ECAC Hockey First Team	1992–93
AHCA East Second-Team All-American	1992–93

- 1997–98: Calder Cup Philadelphia Phantoms
- 2004–05: Calder Cup Philadelphia Phantoms
- 2006: Inducted into Philadelphia Phantoms Hall of Fame
- 2007: Inducted into RPI's Athletic Hall of Fame

== Career statistics ==
=== Regular season and playoffs ===
			Regular season										Playoffs
Season	Team	League	GP	W	L	T	OTL	MIN	GA	SO	GAA	SV%	GP	W	L	MIN	GA	SO	GAA	SV%
1989–90	Estevan Bruins	SJHL	46	21	19	4	—	2707	—	—	3.32	—	—	—	—	—	—	—	—	—
1990–91	R.P.I.	ECAC	18	9	8	0	—	1032	71	0	4.13	.879	—	—	—	—	—	—	—	—
1991–92	R.P.I.	ECAC	28	11	11	3	—	1532	96	0	3.76	.874	—	—	—	—	—	—	—	—
1992–93	R.P.I.	ECAC	31	19	9	3	—	1801	88	0	2.93	.906	—	—	—	—	—	—	—	—
1993–94	R.P.I.	ECAC	27	16	7	4	—	1570	102	0	3.36	.899	—	—	—	—	—	—	—	—
1993–94	Hershey Bears	AHL	1	0	0	0	—	18	1	0	3.23	.889	—	—	—	—	—	—	—	—
1994–95	Johnstown Chiefs	ECHL	16	7	6	1	—	897	55	0	3.68	.896	3	0	2	145	11	0	4.55	.864
1994–95	Hershey Bears	AHL	19	5	7	3	—	919	60	0	3.91	.868	—	—	—	—	—	—	—	—
1995–96	Hershey Bears	AHL	48	21	18	6	—	2680	149	0	3.34	.895	1	0	1	60	4	0	4.02	.902
1996–97	Philadelphia Phantoms	AHL	54	31	12	7	—	3007	145	0	2.89	.909	10	6	4	620	20	1	1.94	.935
1997–98	Philadelphia Phantoms	AHL	51	31	11	7	—	2960	145	0	2.94	.903	20	15	5	1193	48	3	2.41	.927
1998–99	Grand Rapids Griffins	IHL	50	18	21	5	—	2740	144	3	3.15	.894	—	—	—	—	—	—	—	—
1999–00	Philadelphia Phantoms	AHL	51	26	18	2	—	2830	143	1	3.03	.906	5	2	3	298	15	0	3.02	.922
2000–01	Philadelphia Phantoms	AHL	58	22	27	4	—	3117	148	2	2.85	.909	10	5	5	631	23	1	2.19	.926
2001–02	Philadelphia Flyers	NHL	1	0	1	0	—	60	4	0	4.00	.862	—	—	—	—	—	—	—	—
2001–02	Philadelphia Phantoms	AHL	35	13	15	7	—	2079	70	2	2.02	.926	5	2	3	298	13	0	2.62	.917
2002–03	Philadelphia Phantoms	AHL	42	18	9	4	—	2478	103	4	2.49	.907	—	—	—	—	—	—	—	—
2003–04	Philadelphia Flyers	NHL	1	0	1	0	—	33	2	0	3.61	.750	—	—	—	—	—	—	—	—
2003–04	Philadelphia Phantoms	AHL	34	21	12	1	—	1900	62	6	1.96	.920	—	—	—	—	—	—	—	—
2004–05	Philadelphia Phantoms	AHL	26	15	7	0	—	1383	54	3	2.34	.921	2	1	0	25	0	0	0.00	1.000
2005–06	Espoo Blues	FIN	37	14	16	—	7	2100	85	2	2.43	.916	—	—	—	—	—	—	—	—
NHL totals			2	0	2	0	—	93	6	0	3.86	.838	—	—	—	—	—	—	—	—
