= Philadelphia Phantoms =

Former American hockey team

- City: Philadelphia, Pennsylvania
- League: American Hockey League
- Operated: 1996–2009
- Home arena: Wachovia Spectrum; Wachovia Center
- Colors: Black, purple, orange, white
- Affiliates: Philadelphia Flyers

Franchise history
- 1996–2009: Philadelphia Phantoms
- 2009–2014: Adirondack Phantoms
- 2014–present: Lehigh Valley Phantoms

Championships
- Regular season titles: 2 (1996–97, 1997–98)
- Division titles: 4 (1996–97, 1997–98, 1998–99, 2003–04)
- Conference titles: 2 (1997–98, 2004–05)
- Calder Cups: 2 (1997–98, 2004–05)

The Philadelphia Phantoms were a professional ice hockey team that played in the American Hockey League (AHL) from 1996 to 2009. The club was based in Philadelphia, Pennsylvania, and played most of its home games at the Spectrum. During schedule conflicts or some Calder Cup playoff games, games were moved to the adjacent Wachovia Center. The Phantoms won two Calder Cup titles (1998 and 2005) during their tenure in Philadelphia.

In anticipation of the planned closure and demolition of the Spectrum, the franchise was sold in early 2009. The new owners moved the club to Glens Falls, New York, for the 2009–10 season and renamed them the Adirondack Phantoms. Beginning in the 2014–15 season, the team moved to Allentown, Pennsylvania, in a new 8,500-seat arena, the PPL Center.

== History ==
The Phantoms were the fourth AHL franchise to call Philadelphia home, following the Ramblers/Rockets (1936–1942), Rockets (1946–1949), and Firebirds (1977–1979).

=== Predecessor AHL clubs in Philadelphia ===
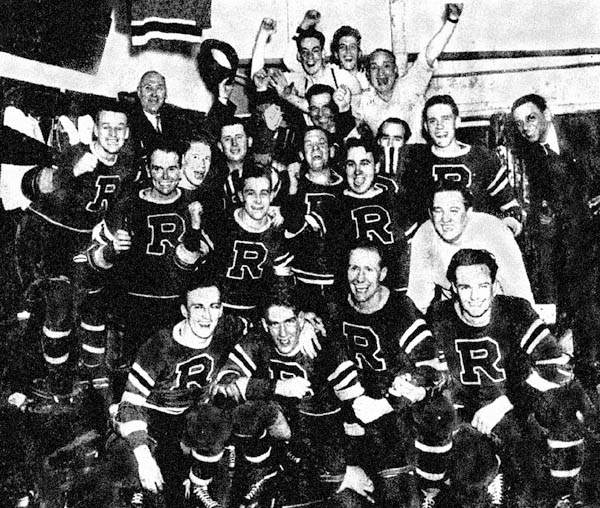
The first of three Philadelphia AHL predecessors to the Phantoms, the 1938–39 Philadelphia Ramblers celebrate a play-off series win over the Hershey Bears (I-AHL).

When the Canadian–American Hockey League (1926–36) and original International Hockey League (1929–36) began playing an interlocking schedule in 1936–37 as the International-American Hockey League, the then defending "Can-Am" champion Philadelphia Ramblers (née Philadelphia Arrows) became one of the new combined circuit's eight original member clubs. After two seasons of interlocking play, the two leagues formally merged on June 28, 1938, and the circuit renamed itself the American Hockey League in 1940. By 1942, however, that original Philadelphia franchise (which was renamed the "Rockets" in 1941 after losing its affiliation with the New York Rangers) fell on hard times and permanently suspended operations.

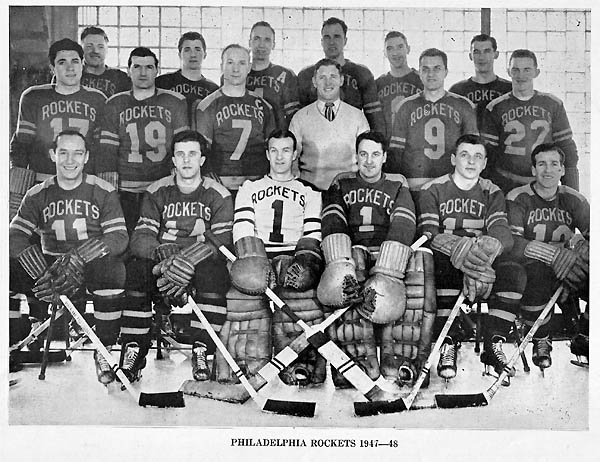
The 1946–47 AHL Philadelphia Rockets.

The AHL's next two tries in Philadelphia were made in 1946 by a new Philadelphia Rockets (1946–49) and again in 1977 by the NAHL refugee Philadelphia Firebirds (1977–1979), but neither team met with much longevity or on-ice success. The 1946–47 Rockets in fact still hold the AHL mark for fewest wins in a season at five on a record of 5–52–7. The AHL's dismal record in the city all changed, however, with the establishment in 1996 of a fourth AHL club in the city, the Phantoms, which went on to win a pair of Calder Cup titles (1998, 2005) during its thirteen-season run.

=== The Flyers bring the AHL back to Philadelphia ===
For the 12 seasons (1984–96) prior to the Phantoms' founding, the National Hockey League (NHL)'s Philadelphia Flyers had maintained a highly-successful affiliation with the AHL's oldest franchise, the Hershey Bears, which included a Calder Cup title in 1988. In September 1996, however, the Flyers left their long-time home arena, the Spectrum, and moved across the parking lot into the soon-to-be-completed CoreStates Center. Instead of demolishing the Spectrum, Comcast Spectacor, the owner of both arenas as well as the Flyers, elected to keep it open and active, but doing so would require a tenant to fill the 80 to 100 NHL and National Basketball Association (NBA) dates the Spectrum would lose to the CoreStates Center.

To help achieve this end, the Flyers purchased an AHL expansion franchise in December 1995 which would begin operation in the 1996–97 season. A few weeks later, it was announced that the new team would be named the Philadelphia Phantoms and be coached by Hall of Famer and former Flyer winger Bill Barber, assisted by veteran ex-Bear and Flyer defenseman Mike Stothers. This was the same tandem who were then coaching the Flyers' prospects in Hershey.

=== Early success ===
The Phantoms played their first ever regular season game on October 4, 1996, defeating the Springfield Falcons 6–3 in Springfield. The franchise's first goal was scored by defenseman John Stevens, the team's first captain (who had, coincidentally, scored the first goal in Falcons' history as that team's first captain). The club made its Spectrum debut two days later on October 6 before an enthusiastic crowd of 9,166 which saw them defeat the visiting Rochester Americans 3–1 in the first regular season AHL game played in Philadelphia since the departure of the Philadelphia Firebirds in 1979. By season's end, the Phantoms had compiled a 49–18–3–10 record for a League-best 111 points, ten more than second overall Hershey's 101. Center Peter White captured the Sollenberger Trophy as the AHL's top scorer with 105 points while center Vaclav Prospal finished fourth overall in the League with 95 despite having been called up to the Flyers with 17 games left in the season.

After defeating the Baltimore Bandits in three games in the opening round of their first-ever playoffs, the Phantoms then met their now already archrivals, the Hershey Bears, in a best-of-seven second round set. After losing the opening game 5–3, the Phantoms evened the series with a 7–4 victory in the second game which featured, among other things, 350 minutes in penalties (171 to the Phantoms), 14 game misconducts, a pair of suspensions, a fight in which goaltender Neil Little knocked-out Bears' backup goaltender Sinuhe Wallinheimo and the appearance of five goalies (Jean-Francois Labbe, Wallinheimo and Sylvain Rodrigue for Hershey; Little and Dominic Roussel for Philadelphia). After dropping Game 6 with a score of 3–2 at Hershey that ended when Blair Atcheynum slipped the Bears' 57th shot of the night (and the 121st overall by both teams) behind Little on a breakaway at :42 of the third overtime, the Phantoms' first season came to an end when Hershey edged them again, 3–2, in Game 7 at the Spectrum three nights later on May 14. (Hershey went on to win their eighth Calder Cup title a few weeks later.)

=== 1998: Philadelphia's first Calder Cup ===
The Phantoms' ice rink at the Spectrum.

As in their inaugural season, the Phantoms again finished first overall in 1997–98 with 106 points on a record of 47–21–2–10, and again Peter White took home the Sollenberger Trophy as the league's top scorer with another 105-point season. Sell-out crowds of 17,380 also packed the Spectrum eight times during the regular season schedule with a total season attendance of 472,392, and over 100,000 more attended the club’s home Calder Cup games during which the Phantoms played and defeated the Rochester Americans, Hershey Bears, Albany River Rats and Saint John Flames.

A crowd of 17,380 (the club's ninth sell-out of the year) filled the Spectrum on the evening of June 10, 1998, for Game 6 of the finals that saw the Phantoms play a virtually flawless contest as they defeated the Flames 6–1 behind the stellar goaltending of Neil Little, who had allowed just 48 post-season goals on his way to a 15–5 playoff record. Winger Mike Maneluk earned the Jack A. Butterfield Trophy as the playoff MVP while also being the League's leading post-season scorer with 34 points (13 goals and 21 assists). Team captain John Stevens (who had also won Calder Cups with Hershey in 1988 and Springfield in 1991, and would coach the Phantoms to another title in 2005) and his teammates paraded the Calder Cup around the same ice as the Flyers had skated their first Stanley Cup 24 years earlier.

=== 1999 AHL All Star game ===
On January 24, 1999, the Phantoms hosted the 1999 AHL All-Star Game before a crowd of 14,120 at the then First Union (now Wells Fargo) Center. Philadelphia defenseman Serhiy Klymentiev, center Richard Park and goaltender Jean-Marc Pelletier all skated for the PlanetUSA team in that game, while centers Peter White and Jim Montgomery joined Head Coach Bill Barber and Assistant Coach Mike Stothers on the Canadian squad for which White also served as captain. Pelletier won the game’s MVP award with his outstanding period of work for PlanetUSA in their 5–4 win over Barber's Canadian squad.

The Phantoms continued to draw fans through the turnstiles at a prodigious rate in 1998–99 as they drew a then-franchise single game attendance record of 19,532 at the First Union Center on February 28, 1999, to see the Phantoms and the Kentucky Thoroughblades skate to a 3–3 draw. With a capacity crowd of 17,380 at the Spectrum on April 11 to watch the Phantoms conclude their home schedule against the Hershey Bears, the club established an AHL-best overall single season attendance record of 480,106 for an average of 12,002 fans per game.

=== Coaches ===
With Head Coach Bill Barber's promotion to the Flyers after the 1999–2000 season as an assistant (and later head) coach, Assistant Coach John Stevens—who had been forced to retire as a player the previous season because of a serious eye injury—became the second head coach of the Phantoms in June 2000. Stevens, the team's first captain, was soon joined by two more former Flyer players, defenseman Kjell Samuelsson and winger Don Nachbaur, to complete the new staff. In November 2003, long-time NHL tough guy and former Flyer left wing Craig Berube signed with the Phantoms to finish his 18-year professional career back in Philadelphia as a player/assistant coach. At the end of that season, he retired as a player to become a full-time assistant coach for the 2004–05 campaign, replacing Nachbaur, who had since returned to the Western Hockey League (WHL) as head coach of the Tri-City Americans.

While it may have only been a coincidence, not long after signing Berube, the Phantoms and Binghamton Senators combined for 373 penalty minutes in a 5–1 Senators' win at the Spectrum on December 28, 2003, to establish new club records for most penalties in minutes (PIM), with 210, combined PIM and even an individual team mark set by Peter Vandermeer with 44 PIM. After 11 fights and 15 game misconducts, the game was called with eight seconds remaining due to a lack of enough remaining players on each team. When John Stevens was promoted to the Flyers as an assistant coach after the 2005–06 season, Berube was named the Phantoms' third head coach in June 2006. After Stevens was promoted to Flyers head coach, Berube left the Phantoms to join Stevens' staff as an assistant coach. Samuelsson, a Phantoms' assistant coach for six seasons, was named the fourth head coach in Phantoms history on October 23, 2006, and two-time Stanley Cup winner Joe Mullen, a 2000 inductee in Hockey Hall of Fame and former teammate of Samuelsson's with the Pittsburgh Penguins, joined the club as his assistant coach. Berube returned to the Phantoms as head coach again with the 2007–08 season (and Samuelsson to associate coach) while Mullen joined former Phantoms' mentor John Stevens with the Flyers as an assistant coach for the NHL club. Berube himself joined the Flyers' coaching staff in 2008 and was replaced behind the Phantoms' bench by former Flyer winger John Paddock, a five-time Calder Cup winner as a player (two times) and coach (three times), including with the 1987–88 Hershey Bears when that team was the Flyers' AHL affiliate.

=== A goalie scores – shorthanded and in OT ===
The Phantoms clinched the F. G. (Teddy) Oke Trophy as the AHL's East Division 2003–04 regular-season champion with a 0–0 tie in Bridgeport on April 10 for its fourth division title and 13th shutout of the season. (The previous franchise record for shutouts was just five.) The following night the club ended the regular season by completing its improbable 12–0 season sweep in games of the rival Hershey Bears with a bizarre 3–2 overtime victory at the Giant Center in Hershey. Goalie Antero Niittymaki was credited with the game-winner on a shorthanded, empty-net goal 2:32 into the extra session, making him the first-ever Phantom goaltender to "score" a goal. (Needing a win to make the playoffs, the Bears pulled their goaltender during an overtime power-play and inadvertently directed the puck in their own net. As the last Phantom to touch the puck, Niittymaki was credited with the goal.)

=== 2005: A second Calder Cup ===
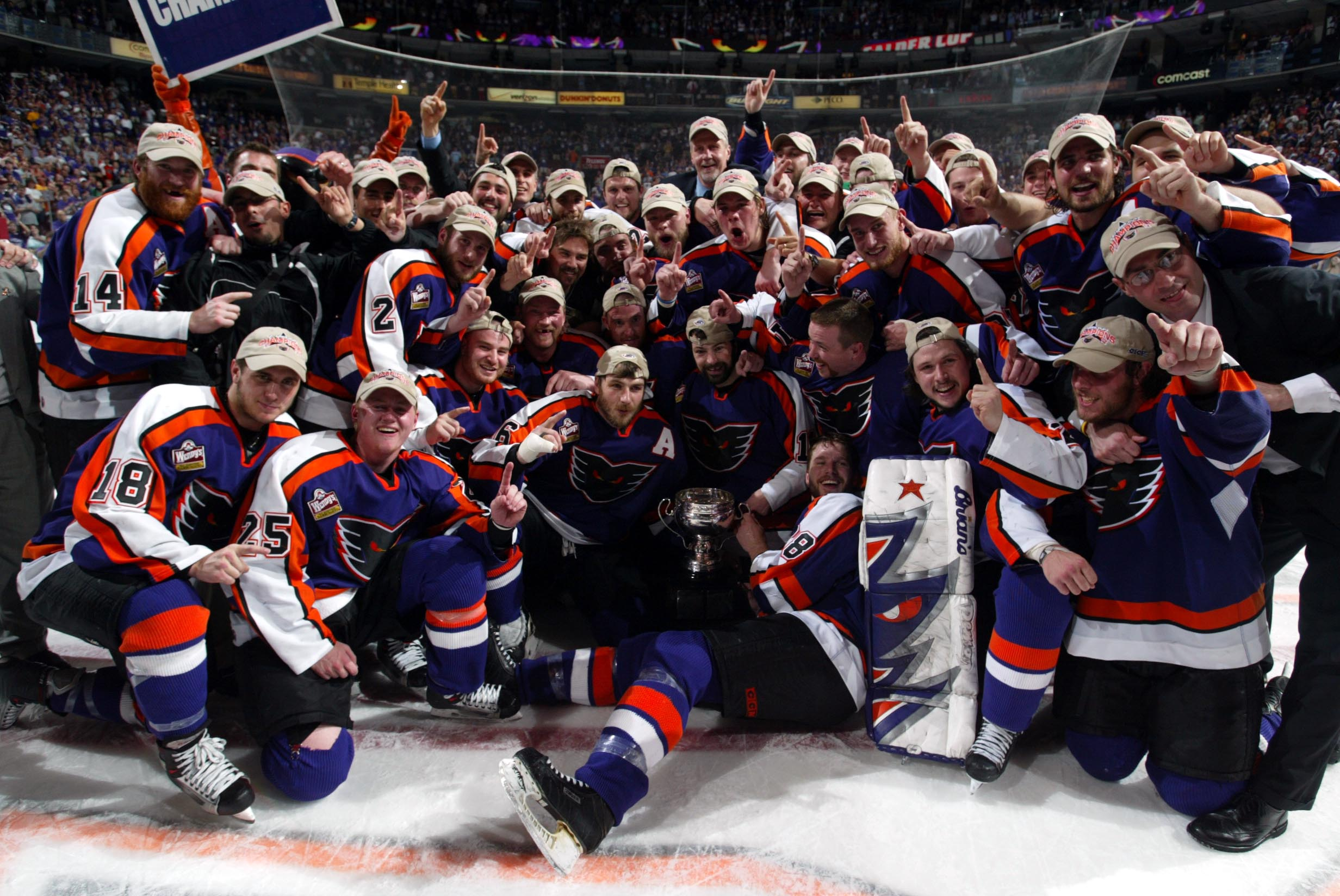
the 2004-05 Phantoms with the Calder Cup

The 2004–05 season would see the now 70-year-old Calder Cup return to Philadelphia for a second time, and do so in record setting fashion. After dropping their first two games of the season on the road, the Phantoms posted a 5–3 victory over Hamilton in their home opener on October 22 which would prove to be the first win in an AHL-record 17-game win streak which they set with 3–1 victory in Hershey on November 27. On April 15, Antero Niittymaki's 4–1 victory over Hershey also broke the team record for most wins in a season by a goaltender as he registered his 32nd win to break veteran teammate Neil Little's mark of 31 set in both 1996–97 and 1997–98. While Niittymaki saw most of the playing time in the season, veteran Phantom netminder Neil Little was still able to make his mark as he became just the tenth goaltender in AHL history to accumulate 200 wins when he shut-out the Bridgeport Sound Tigers on March 4 as the club compiled a 16–7–1 record over the final two months of the regular season to finish just three points behind the Jason Spezza-led Binghamton Senators for second place in the division.

While the Phantoms were already a very solid contender entering the playoffs, the roster improved drastically with the addition of the Flyers' two graduating 2003 first-round draft picks, centers Jeff Carter of the Ontario Hockey League (OHL)'s Sault Ste. Marie Greyhounds (taken 11th overall) and Mike Richards of the OHL' Kitchener Rangers (taken 24th); each joined the Phantoms after their respective junior team were eliminated from the Memorial Cup. Carter arrived in time for the final week of the regular season schedule and went on to lead the AHL in playoff scoring with 23 points (12 goals and 11 assists) in 21 games, while Richards joined one game into the second round and went on to collect 15 points (seven goals and eight assists) in 14 games.

The Phantoms' 2005 playoff run began against the Norfolk Admirals, a team that had defeated Philadelphia in six of their ten regular-season meetings including the last game of the season played at the Spectrum on April 17. Philadelphia took the first round set in six games with a 4–2 victory at the Wachovia Center located across the parking lot from the Spectrum. (With the circus in the Spectrum for two weeks as the playoffs began and no conflicting Flyers' post-season dates at the Center because of the lockout, the AHL club would end up playing all 13 of its home Calder Cup games in the much larger NHL building.)

In the second round they met the Wilkes-Barre/Scranton Penguins who had already upset the Binghamton Senators in their first round set. After the Phantoms took the first two games at home and split games three and four in Wilkes-Barre, the series returned to the Center for one of the most memorable games in team history. Trailing 4–1 approaching the midway point of the third period of game five, the Phantoms exploded for six unanswered goals over the game's final ten minutes en route to a 7–4 victory and a berth in the Eastern Conference Finals against the Providence Bruins whom the Phantoms dispatched as well in six games with another victory at the Center which also extended their post season home ice record to a perfect 11–0.

With the victory over Providence, the Phantoms were back to the Calder Cup Finals for the first time since 1998 and would meet the Chicago Wolves, another powerhouse team that up until that point had breezed through the playoffs including a sweep of the Manitoba Moose in the Western Conference Finals. While both teams had plenty of scoring power, it was expected to be a battle of two stellar Finnish goaltenders—the Phantoms' Niittymaki and the Wolves' Kari Lehtonen—who had both been stellar performers all season long. Even though the Phantoms had finished the regular season with 103 points on a record of 48–25–3–4, for the first time in the 2005 post-season they would have to open a series on the road, as Chicago had finished with 105 points (49–24–5–2) and had lost just seven times at home all season.

As expected, the first three games of the series were tight-checking, low-scoring contests featuring stellar goaltending at both ends of the ice. Niittymaki, however, who was just a little bit better than Lehtonen, earned a surprise 1–0 shutout victory in Game 1. He was even better in Game 2, however, holding the high-scoring Wolves to just one goal in a 2–1 double overtime victory to send the series back to Philadelphia where the next three games—if necessary—would be played and where the Phantoms were already 11–0 in the playoffs. Niittymaki again held the Wolves to just one goal as the Phantoms defeated Chicago again, 2–1, in Game 3. Through almost 11 periods of hockey over three games, Niittymaki had allowed the Wolves, who had scored 245 regular season goals, just two goals while Lehtonen and had been solved for just five by the Phantoms. The differential of three goals, however, was enough to give Philadelphia a 3–0 stranglehold on the series going into Game 4 on June 10.

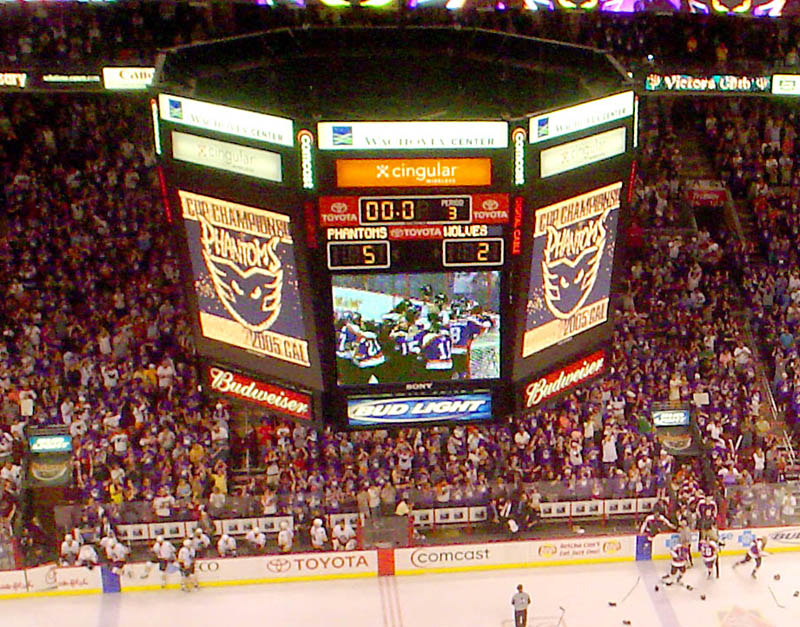
The Phantoms winning their second and final Calder Cup on June 10, 2005.

An AHL playoff-record crowd of 20,103 NHL-lockout hockey starved fans filled the seats as the puck dropped that night hoping to see a Philadelphia professional hockey team win a playoff title on home ice for just the fifth time in the 78 years since the C-AHL Philadelphia Arrows first played a professional hockey game in the city in 1927. The Phantoms did not disappoint the SRO crowd as they defeated the Wolves handily, 5–2, with center Ben Stafford (who retired after the playoffs and is now a lieutenant in US Marine Corps serving in Iraq) collecting the Cup-winning goal. Rookie Jeff Carter's 23 points (12 goals and 11 assists) earned him individual honors as the AHL's top scorer in the playoffs, while Niittymaki won the Jack Butterfield Award as the Calder Cup MVP. After the Phantoms shook hands with the Wolves players at center ice, AHL President Dave Andrews handed the Calder Cup to team captain Boyd Kane, who skated it around the ice. Ironically, exactly seven years earlier to the day, Phantoms Head Coach John Stevens had received the same Cup from the same hands a few hundred yards away at the Spectrum as captain of the 1997–98 Phantoms. The Phantoms' victory was just the fifth time that a professional hockey title in any league had been won in a game taking place in Philadelphia since the sport was first played in the city in 1927.

=== Phantoms in the NHL ===
The 2004–05 Phantoms not only brought the Calder Cup back to Philadelphia for a second time, but also sent a dozen members of its championship roster on to the NHL in 2005–06. Nine players—Antero Niittymaki, Jeff Carter, Mike Richards, Patrick Sharp, Jon Sim, Joni Pitkanen, Dennis Seidenberg, Freddy Meyer and R. J. Umberger—all saw regular service with the Flyers in 2005–06, while Ben Eager, Randy Jones, Josh Gratton, Wade Skolney and Ryan Ready also were called up at least once during the season. Seidenberg, however, was later traded during the 2005–06 season to the Phoenix Coyotes.

Head Coach John Stevens later joined the Flyers as an assistant coach at the start of the 2006–07 season, eventually replacing Ken Hitchcock as head coach a month into the season.

=== The final season ===
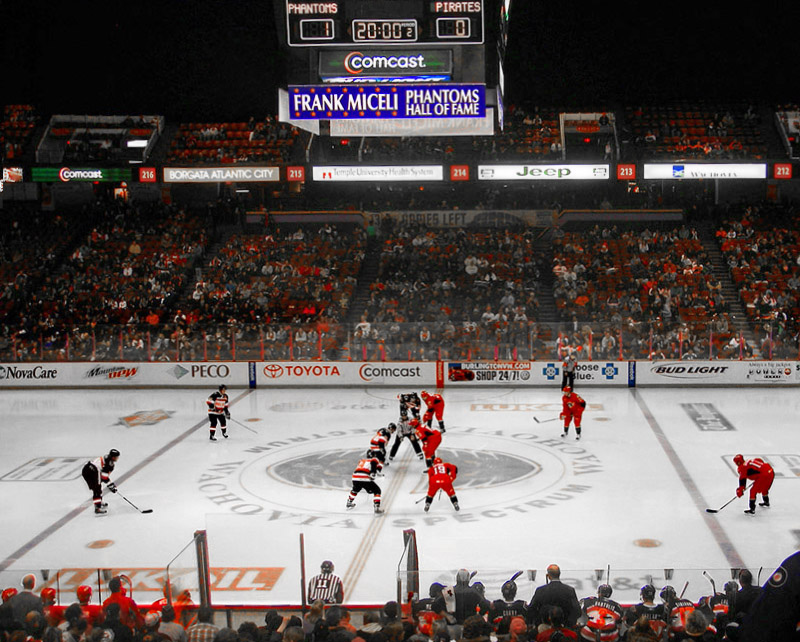
The Phantoms face off during their 13th and final season at the Spectrum. (2008–09).

Due to the impending demolition of the Wachovia Spectrum, originally scheduled for February 4, 2009, it was announced that Comcast Spectacor reached an agreement to sell the Phantoms to the Brooks Group of Pittsburgh. The new ownership expressed an interest in eventually moving the Phantoms to Allentown, Pennsylvania, conditioned on the construction of a new multi-purpose arena there. Until a permanent new home was ready for the club, however it operated temporarily in Glens Falls, New York, the former home of the AHL's Adirondack Red Wings. Comcast Spectacor continued to operate the team through the conclusion of the 2008–09 season.

Throughout their final season, the Phantoms wore a series of specialty jerseys in commemoration of the Spectrum and its history. These included among others a jersey designed after the jerseys worn in the 1976 NHL All-Star Game, a Broad Street Bullies jersey and a black Spectrum jersey with red, orange, green and blue stripes similar to the Spectrum logo.

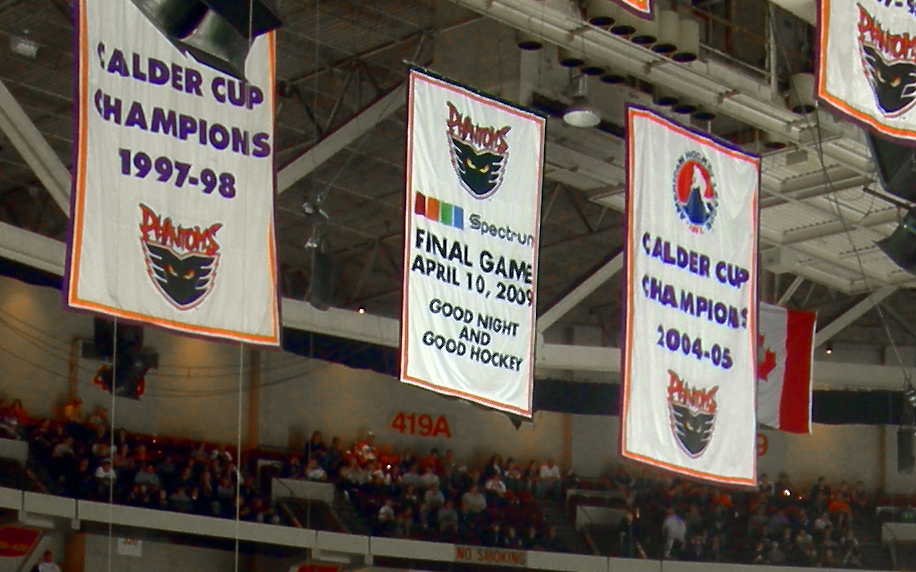

On April 10, 2009, the Phantoms played their final regular season home game at the Spectrum in front of a standing room only crowd of 17,380 (the 21st sell-out in team history) and defeated the Hershey Bears, 5–2. Rob Sirianni collected the final regular season hat-trick in Spectrum history while the win also secured the Phantoms a berth in the Calder Cup playoffs. During a pre-game ceremony, one final banner was raised to the rafters of the Spectrum paying tribute to "The Final Home Game" and included the signature sign-off of Gene Hart, the late longtime voice of the club's NHL parent Philadelphia Flyers: "Good night and good hockey."

The Phantoms ended their 13th and final AHL regular season schedule with a 3–2 loss in Hershey the following night, setting-up a Hershey/Philadelphia matchup in the first round of the 2009 Calder Cup playoffs. The series was the fourth overall between the two Pennsylvania clubs and the first since 2000.

== Season-by-season results ==
=== Regular season ===
Season	Games	Won	Lost	Tied	OTL	SOL	Points	Goals for	Goals against	Standing
1996–97	80	49	18	10	3	—	111	325	230	1st, Mid-Atlantic
1997–98	80	47	21	10	2	—	106	314	249	1st, Mid-Atlantic
1998–99	80	47	22	9	2	—	105	272	221	1st, Mid-Atlantic
1999–2000	80	44	31	3	2	—	93	281	239	3rd, Mid-Atlantic
2000–01	80	36	34	5	5	—	82	246	244	4th, Mid-Atlantic
2001–02	80	33	27	15	5	—	86	206	210	3rd, South
2002–03	80	33	33	6	8	—	80	198	212	4th, South
2003–04	80	46	25	7	2	—	101	216	168	1st, East
2004–05	80	48	25	—	3	4	103	235	185	2nd, East
2005–06	80	34	37	—	2	7	77	197	232	6th, East
2006–07	80	31	41	—	2	6	70	222	271	7th, East
2007–08	80	46	27	—	4	3	99	236	212	2nd, East
2008–09	80	43	30	—	2	5	93	234	232	4th, East
Totals	GP	W	L	T	OTL	SOL	Pts	GF	GA	
13	1,040	537	371	65	42	25	1,206	4,374	2,905	

=== Playoffs ===
Season	Prelim	1st round	2nd round	3rd round	Finals
1996–97	—	W, 3–0, BALT	L, 3–4, HER	—	—
1997–98	—	W, 3–1, ROCH	W, 4–0, HER	W, 4–2, ALB	W, 4–2, SJNB
1998–99	—	W, 3–0, CIN	W, 4–3, KEN	L, 2–4, ROCH	—
1999–2000	—	L, 2–3, HER	—	—	—
2000–01	—	W, 3–1, ROCH	L, 2–4, WBS	—	—
2001–02	W, 2–0, ROCH	L, 0–3, SYR	—	—	—
2002–03	Out of playoffs.				
2003–04	—	W, 4–2, NOR	L, 2–4, WBS	—	—
2004–05	—	W, 4–2, NOR	W, 4–1, WBS	W, 4–2, PROV	W, 4–0, CHI
2005–06	Out of playoffs.				
2006–07	Out of playoffs.				
2007–08	—	W, 4–3, ALB	L, 1–4, WBS	—	—
2008–09	—	L, 0–4, HER	—	—	—

== Team records ==
=== Single season ===
Goals: 47 Mike Maneluk (1999–2000)
Assists: 78 Peter White (1997–98)
Points: 105 Peter White (1996–97 and 1997–98)
Penalty Minutes: 416 Francis Lessard (1999–2000)
GAA: 1.96 Neil Little (2003–04)
SV%: .926 Neil Little (2001–02)

=== Career ===
Career Goals: 153 Peter White
Career Assists: 319 Peter White
Career Points: 472 Peter White
Career Penalty Minutes: 1046 Pete Vandermeer
Career Goaltending Wins: 177 Neil Little
Career Shutouts: 18 Neil Little
Career Games: 431 Peter White

Affiliates

- Philadelphia Flyers (1996-2009)

== Phantoms Hall of Fame ==
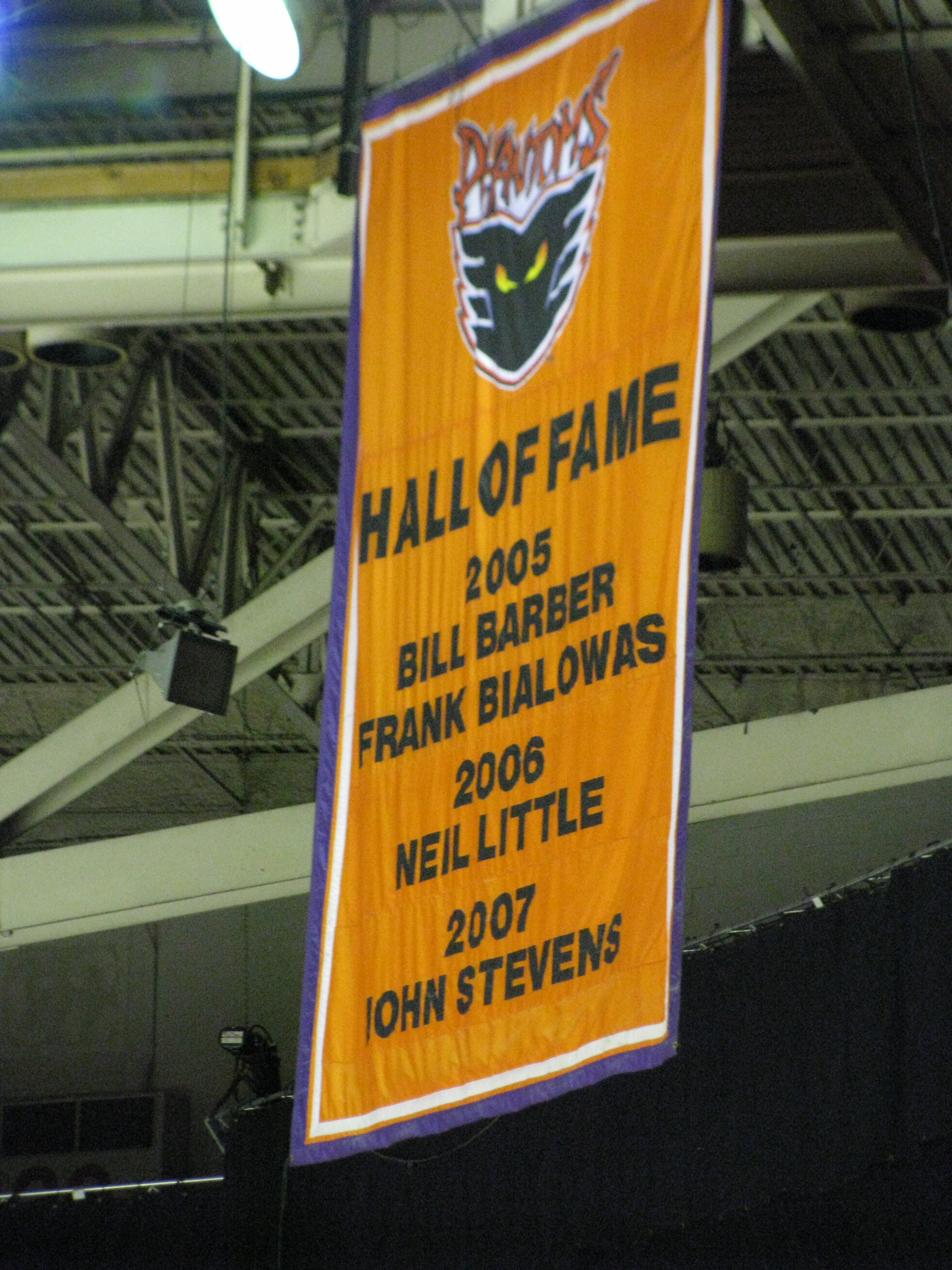

From 2005 to 2009, the Phantoms enshrined seven members into a team hall of fame. No new members were inducted during the team's five seasons in Glens Falls, New York.

Individual	Year	Primary roles with Phantoms
Bill Barber	2005	Head coach (1996–2000)
Frank Bialowas	2005	Player (1996–1999)
Neil Little	2006	Player (1996–1998, 1999–2005)
John Stevens	2007	Player (1996–1999); Head coach (2000–2006)
Bob Clarke	2008	General Manager (1996–2006)
Frank Miceli	2009	Chief Operating Officer (1996–2008)
Peter White	2009	Player (1996–2000, 2002–2004)

== Other professional ice hockey teams in Philadelphia ==
Professional Ice Hockey in Philadelphia
Seasons	League	Team
1927–35	C-AHL	Philadelphia Arrows
1930–31	NHL	Philadelphia Quakers
1932–33	T-SHL	Philadelphia Comets
1935–36; 1936–41	C-AHL; I-AHL/AHL	Philadelphia Ramblers
1941–42	AHL	Philadelphia Rockets
1942–46	EAHL	Philadelphia Falcons
1946–49	AHL	Philadelphia Rockets
1951	EAHL	Philadelphia Falcons
1955–64	EHL	Philadelphia Ramblers
1967–present	NHL	Philadelphia Flyers
1972–73	WHA	Philadelphia Blazers
1974–77; 1977–79	NAHL; AHL	Philadelphia Firebirds
1996–2009	AHL	Philadelphia Phantoms

== See also ==
- List of Philadelphia Phantoms players
