= Rob Sirianni =

Canadian-born Italian ice hockey player

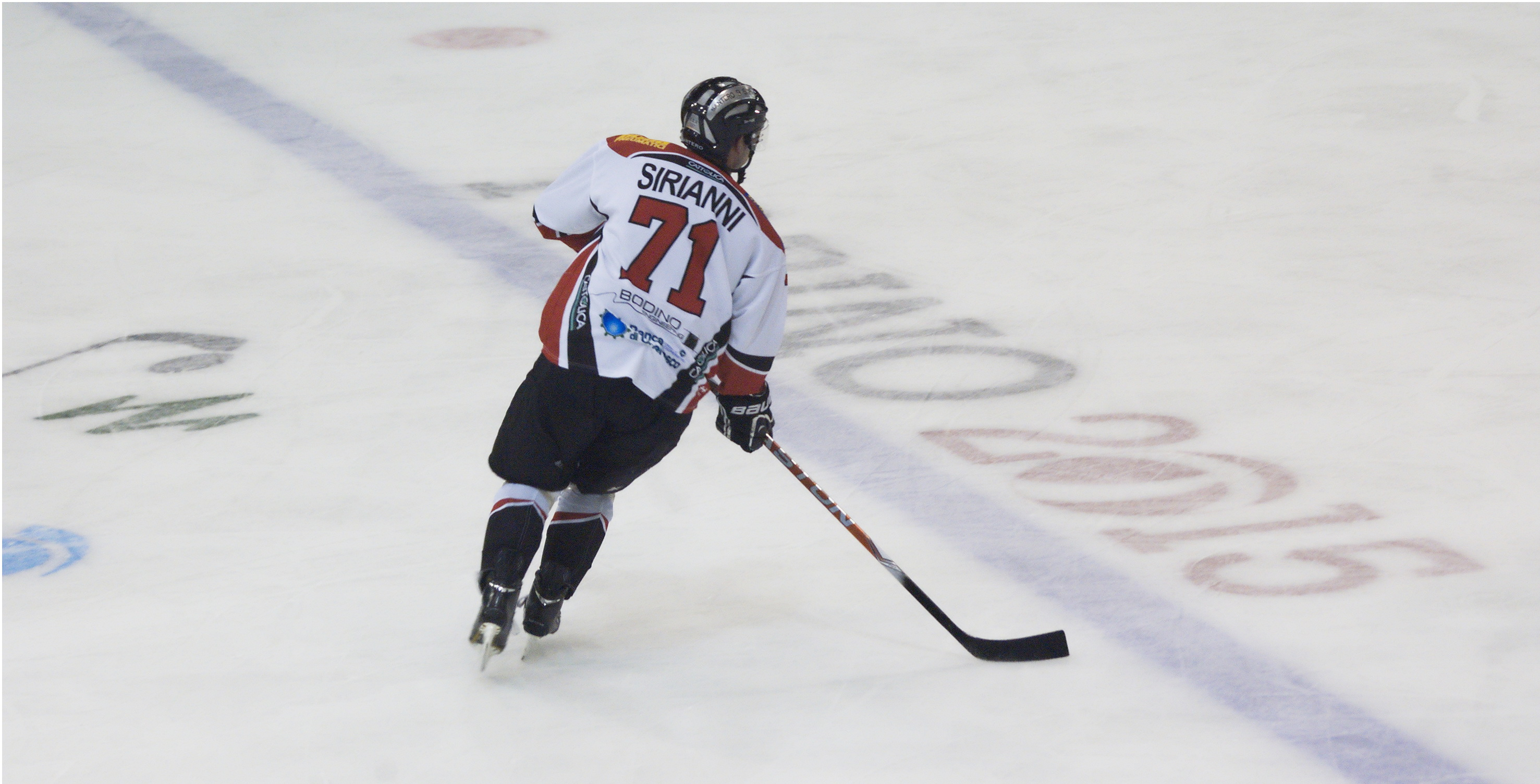
- Born: October 31, 1983 (age 42) Edmonton, Alberta, Canada
- Height: 5 ft 11 in (180 cm)
- Weight: 170 lb (77 kg; 12 st 2 lb)
- Position: Forward
- Shot: Right
- Played for: Bonnyville Pontiacs; Bemidji State University; Syracuse Crunch; Utah Grizzlies; Wheeling Nailers; Binghamton Senators; Philadelphia Phantoms; HC Pustertal; Sheffield Steelers; HC Valpellice
- National team: Italy
- NHL draft: Undrafted
- Playing career: 2000–2014

Robert Sirianni (born October 31, 1983) is a retired Canadian-born Italian professional ice hockey player.

He played with the HC Pustertal and HC Valpellice of the Serie A. Sirianni competed in the 2012 IIHF World Championship as a member of the Italy men's national ice hockey team.
