= 2013–14 Hershey Bears season =

American ice hockey club season

2013–14 Hershey Bears
- Division: 4th East Division
- Conference: 9th Eastern Conference
- 2013–14 record: 39–27–5–5 (88 pts)
- Home record: 24–10–1–3
- Road record: 15–17–4–2
- Goals for: 221
- Goals against: 213

Team information
- General manager: Doug Yingst
- Coach: Mike Haviland
- Assistant coach: Ryan Mougenel
- Captain: Dane Byers
- Alternate captains: Garrett Mitchell; Jeff Taffe
- Arena: Giant Center

Team leaders
- Goals: Jeff Taffe (21)
- Assists: Kris Newbury (31)
- Points: Kris Newbury (49)
- Penalty minutes: Dane Byers (211)
- Plus/minus: (+) Cameron Schilling; Michael Latta (+14) (−) Jeff Taffe (−20)
- Wins: David Leggio (23)
- Goals against average: Riley Gill (1.66)

The 2013–14 Hershey Bears season is the franchise's 76th season in the American Hockey League, which began on October 5, 2013. It marked the first season with Mike Haviland as head coach, having replaced Mark French. Efforts were made to establish a more aggressive, better-balanced team, and 40 percent of the roster were new players once the season began.

== Off-season ==
Follow Hershey's first-round elimination from the 2013 Calder Cup playoffs, it was announced Mark French would not be retained as the Bears head coach, a position he had held four years. He subsequently became head coach of KHL Medveščak Zagreb for the Kontinental Hockey League. Several people were identified as possible candidates to succeed French, including Troy Mann, Paul Jerrard, Mike Stothers, Eric Veilleux and Larry Courville. After a search, it was announced on June 18 that Mike Haviland had been chosen for the position. Bears President Doug Yingst said Haviland was chosen because it was believed he could improve Hershey's home record and create a more aggressive, better-balanced, "in your face" team. Haviland had applied for the Washington Capitals head coach position the year prior, but Adam Oates was selected instead. Troy Mann also departed from his position as Hershey's assistant coach for a job as head coach of ECHL's Bakersfield Condors. He had re-interviewed for his position with the Bears and felt it went well, but said he faced a deadline to accept the Bakersfield job and could not turn it down. Ryan Mougenel was signed as Mann's replacement on July 5. He had previously worked with Haviland, when Mougenel was alternate captain on and Haviland was head coach of the ECHL's Atlantic City Boardwalk Bullies in 2002–03, the year the team won the Kelly Cup.

Several players departed from the Hershey roster during the off season. After 365 games with Hershey and playing as captain since 2001, Boyd Kane left to join French with the Medveščak Zagreb. Dane Byers was named the new captain, with Garrett Mitchell and Jeff Taffe as alternate captains. Barry Almeida, Alex Berry, Mike Carman, Jon Kalinski, Jon DiSalvatore, Danick Paquette, Matt Pope, Ryan Potulny, Dany Sabourin and Mattias Sjögren also left the team, as did Patrick McNeill, who was limited to 47 games in the 2012–13 season due to veteran roster limits. Joey Crabb, who had come to Hershey mid-season from the Washington Capitals after clearing waivers, signed with the Florida Panthers. Byers, Joel Rechlicz, Ryan Stoa, T.J. Syner and Patrick Wellar were all re-signed for the 2013–14 season, and Nicolas Deschamps and Peter LeBlanc received qualifying offers from the Washington Capitals. It was announced June 14 that Taffe re-signed with the Bears. The Swedish Hockey League had announced one month earlier that Taffe had signed a contract with them, but Taffe said that announcement had been premature, and he wanted to keep his family in North America. Hershey signed several new players for the 2013–14 season, including defensemen Nate Schmidt, David Kolomatis and Tyson Strachan; goaltender David Leggio; and forwards Josh Brittain, Michal Čajkovský, Dustin Gazley, Tyler Ruegsegger, Brandon Segal, Matt Watkins, Derek Whitmore, and Jamie Johnson, a former linemate of Taffe's with the Rochester Americans. The Bears also signed forward Nathan Walker, making him the first Australian to play for the American Hockey League. Several Hershey players were released the ECHL's Reading Royals after training camp, including Syner, Brandon Anderson, Mike Banwell, Brett Flemming, Dustin Gazley, Riley Gill, Ryan Kavanagh, David Marshall and Domenic Monardo.

By the end of the off-season, 40 percent of Hershey's new roster were new players. The Bears training camp was held from September 23 to 26 at Hersheypark Arena, followed by a three-game exhibition season that began with a 6–0 shutout victory over the Utica Comets on September 27. Leggio made 25 saves, and Hershey had six successful penalty kills against Utica. Brittain suffered a left arm injury in the game, which could keep him sidelined for the first month of the regular season. The Bears also defeated Wilkes-Barre/Scranton Penguins 6–1 on September 28; Marshall had two goals and two assists, as well as one fight, which gave him a Gordie Howe hat trick. Hershey lost their September 29 preseason finale 2–1, also against the Penguins, with Stoa scoring Hershey's only goal. Hershey went 3-for-16 in the power play in the three exhibition games.

2013–14 Preseason Game Log: 2–1–0–0 (Home: 2–0–0–0; Road: 0–1–0–0)

#	Date	Visitor	Score	Home	OT	Decision	Record
1	September 27	Utica	0–6	Hershey		Leggio	1–0–0–0
2	September 28	WB/Scranton	1–6	Hershey		Grubauer	2–0–0–0
3	September 29	Hershey	1–2	WB/Scranton		Gill	2–1–0–0

== Regular season ==
=== October ===
Hershey lost their first three games of the season for the first time since 2007–08. They lost their October 5 season opener to the Adirondack Phantoms 4–3 after allowing two goals against on rebounds in the first four minutes. Hershey scored three unanswered goals in the second period, but ultimately lost in overtime. The Capitals recalled Nate Schmidt on October 11 to fill in for an injured John Erskine, and sent down to Hershey rookie defenseman Connor Carrick, who starting three games with Washington. The Bears lost 3–1 to the Penguins the next day, allowing two goals against in the final three minutes of the game. Hershey then split a pair of away games against the St. John's IceCaps, losing the first on October 18 by 5–1. Taffe scored the team's sole goal, breaking a 0-for-14 power play streak.

The Bears secured their first win of the season the next day, with Grubauer stopping all 30 shots in a 4–0 shutout. Dmitry Orlov scored a goal and three assists, his first game with more than two points since November 19, 2011. Hershey lost their second straight home game on October 26 with a 4–3 defeat against the Hartford Wolf Pack, surrendering two leads and failing to score on two five-on-three power play goals, including one that lasted 2:56. Hershey recorded their first home victory on the next day with a 4–2 win over Norfolk, with David Leggio making 17 saves in his first victory for the Bears. They outshot the Admirals 38–19, marking the first time Hershey outshot an opponent all season. Nathan Walker scored his first professional goal, making him the first Australian-born player to score in the AHL. The Bears lost their two leading scorers on October 30, as Orlov and Michael Latta were recalled to the Washington Capitals.

=== November ===
Hershey lost their next three games, starting with a home-and-home series against the Penguins on November 1 and 2, dropping the first after winger Matt Watkins missed a penalty shot in overtime, and Wilkes-Barre/Scranton scored with 25 seconds left in the extra period. The Bears lost the second game despite Leggio making 38 saves and Hershey scoring twice in their first three shots, just two minutes apart. In their 4–3 loss against Norfolk on November 3, the Bears scored three goals in three minutes during regulation, but failed to connect on the shootout. Orlov, having just returned from Washington, scored a goal and assist, leaving him tied for eighth in the league for defensemen with eight points, and first for shooting at 40 percent. He was sent back to the Capitals after one day back with Hershey. The Bears were successful in all 10 penalty kills over their past two games, bringing it to sixth-best in the league at 85.7 percent, although their power play was ranked 27th of 30 at 12 percent. Having won only one of five home games so far, Mike Haviland believed the team needed to stop feeling so comfortable on home ice.

== Schedule and results ==
2013–14 Game Log – Regular season

October: 2–3–1–0 (Home: 1–1–1–0; Road: 1–2–0–0)
#	Date	Visitor	Score	Home	OT	Decision	Attendance	Record	Pts	Gamesheet
1	October 5	Adirondack	4–3	Hershey	OT	Grubauer	8,753	0–0–1–0	1	Gamesheet
2	October 12	Hershey	1–3	WB/Scranton		Leggio	7,156	0–1–1–0	1	Gamesheet
3	October 18	Hershey	1–5	St. John's		Leggio	6,287	0–2–1–0	1	Gamesheet
4	October 19	Hershey	4–0	St. John's		Grubauer	6,287	1–2–1–0	3	Gamesheet
5	October 26	Hartford	4–3	Hershey		Grubauer	8,001	1–3–1–0	3	Gamesheet
6	October 27	Norfolk	2–4	Hershey		Leggio	10,125	2–3–1–0	5	Gamesheet

November: 5–4–1–2 (Home: 3–3–0–2; Road: 2–1–1–0)
#	Date	Visitor	Score	Home	OT	Decision	Attendance	Record	Pts	Gamesheet
7	November 1	Hershey	2–3	WB/Scranton	OT	Grubauer	5,019	2–3–2–0	6	Gamesheet
8	November 2	WB/Scranton	4–2	Hershey		Leggio	8,563	2–4–2–0	6	Gamesheet
9	November 3	Norfolk	4–3	Hershey	SO	Leggio	10,760	2–4–2–1	7	Gamesheet
10	November 9	Bridgeport	2–3	Hershey	SO	Grubauer	8,408	3–4–2–1	9	Gamesheet
11	November 10	Binghamton	5–4	Hershey	SO	Grubauer	8,218	3–4–2–2	10	Gamesheet
12	November 13	Hershey	5–3	Charlotte		Leggio	3,878	4–4–2–2	12	Gamesheet
13	November 14	Hershey	8–1	Charlotte		Grubauer	5,451	5–4–2–2	14	Gamesheet
14	November 16	Hershey	1–3	WB/Scranton		Leggio	6,008	5–5–2–2	14	Gamesheet
15	November 23	Binghamton	2–5	Hershey		Grubauer	10,100	6–5–2–2	16	Gamesheet
16	November 24	Binghamton	5–1	Hershey		Grubauer	7,248	6–6–2–2	16	Gamesheet
17	November 27	St. John's	4–2	Hershey		Leggio	8,618	6–7–2–2	16	Gamesheet
18	November 30	WB/Scranton	2–3	Hershey	OT	Leggio	10,081	7–7–2–2	18	Gamesheet

December: 6–5–0–1 (Home: 4–2–0–1; Road: 2–3–0–0)
#	Date	Visitor	Score	Home	OT	Decision	Attendance	Record	Pts	Gamesheet
19	December 1	Providence	3–2	Hershey	SO	Leggio	9,601	7–7–2–3	19	Gamesheet
20	December 6	Hershey	4–2	Binghamton		Leggio	2,727	8–7–2–3	21	Gamesheet
21	December 7	Hershey	2–4	Bridgeport		Leggio	3,680	8–8–2–3	21	Gamesheet
22	December 11	Hershey	4–3	Binghamton	SO	Leggio	3,079	9–8–2–3	23	Gamesheet
23	December 13	Hershey	3–5	WB/Scranton		Leggio	5,947	9–9–2–3	23	Gamesheet
24	December 14	Binghamton	4–7	Hershey		Neuvirth	9,045	10–9–2–3	25	Gamesheet
25	December 18	Syracuse	3–4	Hershey	SO	Leggio	10,801	11–9–2–3	27	Gamesheet
26	December 21	Worcester	3–2	Hershey		Leggio	8,744	11–10–2–3	27	Gamesheet
27	December 22	Worcester	0–4	Hershey		Leggio	8,986	12–10–2–3	29	Gamesheet
28	December 26	Hershey	1–4	Binghamton		Leggio	3,808	12–11–2–3	29	Gamesheet
29	December 27	Syracuse	3–2	Hershey		Leggio	9,278	12–12–2–3	29	Gamesheet
30	December 28	WB/Scranton	1–2	Hershey	SO	Leggio	10,708	13–12–2–3	31	Gamesheet

January: 10–2–1–0 (Home: 7–0–0–0; Road: 3–2–1–0)
#	Date	Visitor	Score	Home	OT	Decision	Attendance	Record	Pts	Gamesheet
31	January 3	Hershey	0–1	Adirondack	OT	Gill	2,576	13–12–3–3	32	Gamesheet
32	January 4	Rochester	1–5	Hershey		Leggio	9,457	14–12–3–3	34	Gamesheet
33	January 5	Manchester	3–6	Hershey		Leggio	8,686	15–12–3–3	36	Gamesheet
34	January 10	Hershey	2–4	Binghamton		Leggio	3,023	15–13–3–3	36	Gamesheet
35	January 11	Springfield	3–5	Hershey		Leggio	9,555	16–13–3–3	38	Gamesheet
36	January 12	Hershey	4–1	Albany		Gill	2,734	17–13–3–3	40	Gamesheet
37	January 17	Hershey	2–3	Syracuse		Leggio	5,302	17–14–3–3	40	Gamesheet
38	January 18	Bridgeport	3–5	Hershey		Gill	10,469	18–14–3–3	42	Gamesheet
39	January 19	Albany	3–4	Hershey	SO	Leggio	9,719	19–14–3–3	44	Gamesheet
40	January 24	Hershey	4–1	Syracuse		Grubauer	5,568	20–14–3–3	46	Gamesheet
41	January 25	Syracuse	2–3	Hershey		Leggio	9,880	21–14–3–3	48	Gamesheet
42	January 26	WB/Scranton	0–2	Hershey		Grubauer	9,485	22–14–3–3	50	Gamesheet
43	January 31	Hershey	5–3	Adirondack		Leggio	4,929	23–14–3–3	52	Gamesheet

February: 6–5–0–1 (Home: 4–1–0–0; Road: 2–4–0–1)
#	Date	Visitor	Score	Home	OT	Decision	Attendance	Record	Pts	Gamesheet
44	February 1	Hershey	1–4	Adirondack		Grubauer	16,173	23–15–3–3	52	Gamesheet
45	February 2	Norfolk	1–3	Hershey		Grubauer	9,186	24–15–3–3	54	Gamesheet
46	February 7	Hershey	1–4	Rochester		Leggio	7,149	24–16–3–3	54	Gamesheet
47	February 8	Portland	1–2	Hershey		Grubauer	9,596	25–16–3–3	56	Gamesheet
48	February 9	WB/Scranton	3–4	Hershey	OT	Grubauer	9,827	26–16–3–3	58	Gamesheet
49	February 14	Hershey	3–2	Albany	SO	Grubauer	2,931	27–16–3–3	60	Gamesheet
50	February 15	WB/Scranton	4–5	Hershey		Grubauer	10,890	28–16–3–3	62	Gamesheet
51	February 16	Hershey	3–1	WB/Scranton		Leggio	5,896	29–16–3–3	64	Gamesheet
52	February 22	Syracuse	5–0	Hershey		Grubauer	10,373	29–17–3–3	64	Gamesheet
53	February 23	Hershey	2–5	Syracuse		Grubauer	15,763	29–18–3–3	64	Gamesheet
54	February 25	Hershey	5–6	WB/Scranton		Leggio	4,391	29–19–3–3	64	Gamesheet
55	February 28	Hershey	1–2	Hartford	SO	Leggio	4,172	29–19–3–4	65	Gamesheet

March: 5–6–1–0 (Home: 3–3–0–0; Road: 2–3–1–0)
#	Date	Visitor	Score	Home	OT	Decision	Attendance	Record	Pts	Gamesheet
56	March 1	Charlotte	4–1	Hershey		Grubauer	9,784	29–20–3–4	65	Gamesheet
57	March 2	Charlotte	6–3	Hershey		Leggio	9,942	29–21–3–4	65	Gamesheet
58	March 7	Hershey	3–2	Norfolk		Leggio	4,690	30–21–3–4	67	Gamesheet
59	March 8	Hershey	1–3	Norfolk		Leggio	8,386	30–22–3–4	67	Gamesheet
60	March 14	Hershey	2–3	Syracuse	OT	Grubauer	4,871	30–22–4–4	68	Gamesheet
61	March 15	Adirondack	1–4	Hershey		Leggio	10,995	31–22–4–4	70	Gamesheet
62	March 16	Norfolk	3–2	Hershey		Grubauer	10,753	31–23–4–4	70	Gamesheet
63	March 21	Hershey	2–0	Providence		Leggio	9,283	32–23–4–4	72	Gamesheet
64	March 22	Hershey	2–4	Worcester		Leggio	4,820	32–24–4–4	72	Gamesheet
65	March 23	Hershey	1–2	Manchester		Grubauer	8,902	32–25–4–4	72	Gamesheet
66	March 28	Albany	1–4	Hershey		Leggio	10,149	33–25–4–4	74	Gamesheet
67	March 29	St. John's	1–2	Hershey	SO	Leggio	10,506	34–25–4–4	76	Gamesheet

April: 5–2–1–1 (Home: 2–0–0–0; Road: 3–2–1–1)
#	Date	Visitor	Score	Home	OT	Decision	Attendance	Record	Pts	Gamesheet
68	April 4	Hershey	3–2	Portland		Leggio	1,268	35–25–4–4	78	Gamesheet
69	April 5	Hershey	3–2	Worcester		Grubauer	4,024	36–25–4–4	80	Gamesheet
70	April 6	Hershey	5–4	Bridgeport		Leggio	5,854	37–25–4–4	82	Gamesheet
71	April 11	Hershey	4–5	Binghamton	OT	Leggio	3,246	37–25–5–4	83	Gamesheet
72	April 12	Hershey	3–4	Springfield	SO	Grubauer	5,848	37–25–5–5	84	Gamesheet
73	April 13	Binghamton	0–1	Hershey	OT	Grubauer	10,984	38–25–5–5	86	Gamesheet
74	April 16	Hershey	3–5	Norfolk		Grubauer	4,525	38–26–5–5	86	Gamesheet
75	April 18	Hershey	1–3	Norfolk		Grubauer	8,701	38–27–5–5	86	Gamesheet
76	April 19	Adirondack	1–2	Hershey		Leggio	10,964	39–27–5–5	88	Gamesheet

Legend: Win (2 points) Loss (0 points) Overtime/shootout loss (1-point)

== Player statistics ==
=== Skaters ===
Note: GP = Games played; G = Goals; A = Assists; Pts = Points; +/− = Plus/minus; PIM = Penalty minutes
Updated as of November 3, 2013

Regular season
Player	GP	G	A	Pts	+/-	PIM
Dmitry Orlov	5	2	6	8	1	0
Jeff Taffe	9	3	2	5	−2	4
Dane Byers	9	3	1	4	4	42
Michael Latta^{‡}	6	2	2	4	3	25
David Kolomatis	5	1	3	4	−1	4
Derek Whitmore	9	3	0	3	−2	4
Peter LeBlanc	9	2	1	3	1	6
Nathan Walker^{*}	6	1	2	3	−1	7
Jamie Johnson	6	0	3	3	−1	6
Connor Carrick^{*}	7	0	3	3	−2	6
Julien Brouillette	4	1	1	2	0	2
Ryan Stoa	4	1	1	2	−2	2
Chay Genoway	9	1	1	2	−4	0
Tyson Strachan	8	0	2	2	2	20
Matt Watkins	8	0	2	2	−2	4
Garrett Mitchell	9	0	2	2	−2	13
Nate Schmidt^{‡}	1	1	0	1	1	0
Tomáš Kundrátek	5	1	0	1	−1	6
Casey Wellman	8	1	0	1	−1	0
Joel Rechlicz	5	0	1	1	1	19
Tyler Ruegsegger	8	0	1	1	−2	2
Cameron Schilling	9	0	1	1	−2	8
Patrick Wellar	1	0	0	0	0	0
T. J. Syner	2	0	0	0	−1	5
Brandon Segal	6	0	0	0	−3	2
Nicolas Deschamps	6	0	0	0	−4	6

^{†}Denotes player spent time with another team before joining team. Stats reflect time with the team only.
^{‡}Left the team mid-season
^{*}Rookie

=== Goaltenders ===
Note: GP = Games played; TOI = Time on Ice; W = Wins; L = Losses; GA = Goals against; GAA = Goals against average; SV = Saves; SA = Shots against; SV% = Save percentage; SO = Shutouts; G = Goals; A = Assists; PIM = Penalty minutes
Updated as of November 3, 2013

Regular season
Player	GP	TOI	W	L	GA	GAA	SV	SA	SV%	SO	G	A	PIM
Philipp Grubauer	4	246:27	1	3	11	2.68	103	114	.904	0	0	0	2
David Leggio	5	303:01	1	4	17	3.37	139	156	.891	0	0	1	0
Totals		549:28	2	7	28	3.06	242	270	.896	0	0	1	2

^{‡}Left the team mid-season
^{*}Rookie

== Milestones ==
Player	Milestone	Reached
Nathan Walker	1st AHL Game	October 5, 2013
Connor Carrick	1st AHL Game	October 12, 2013
Connor Carrick	1st AHL Assist	October 26, 2013
Nathan Walker	1st AHL Goal	October 27, 2013
