= 2012–13 Hershey Bears season =

Hockey team season

2012–13 Hershey Bears
- Division: 4th East Division
- Conference: 8th Eastern Conference
- 2012–13 record: 36–31–3–6 (81 pts)
- Home record: 18–15–3–2
- Road record: 18–16–0–4
- Goals for: 204
- Goals against: 196

Team information
- General manager: Doug Yingst
- Coach: Mark French; Adam Oates (co-coach until November 21)
- Assistant coach: Troy Mann; Calle Johansson (until Nov. 21); Tim Hunter(until Nov. 21)
- Captain: Boyd Kane
- Alternate captains: Jon DiSalvatore; Ryan Potulny
- Arena: Giant Center

Team leaders
- Goals: Jon DiSalvatore (22)
- Assists: Jeff Taffe (57)
- Points: Jeff Taffe (75)
- Penalty minutes: Steven Oleksy (151)
- Wins: Philipp Grubauer (17)
- Goals against average: Dany Sabourin (2.72)

The 2012–13 Hershey Bears season was the franchise's 75th season in the American Hockey League, starting on October 13, 2012, and ending on May 8, 2013, when they were eliminated during the first round of the Calder Cup playoffs.

Due to the 2012–13 National Hockey League lockout, Washington Capitals coach Adam Oates served as co-coach of the Bears alongside head coach Mark French until November. Several Washington players also played with the Bears for a time, including defenseman Dmitry Orlov and goaltender Braden Holtby, who recorded four season shutouts.

The Bears experienced major offensive problems at the start of the season, resulting in the team's worst 17-game start in eight years. But the team saw more success as the season progressed, including a seven-game road winning streak from November 28 to January 11, and a seven-game point streak from January 26 to February 15. The Bears participated in the 2013 AHL Outdoor Classic, but lost to the Wilkes-Barre/Scranton Penguins.

Hershey was eliminated from the playoffs by the Providence Bruins despite winning the first two games in a best-of-five series, marking only the tenth time this had occurred in league history. Afterward, it was announced that French would not be retained for a fifth season as head coach. The 2012–13 season drew a club-record home attendance average of 10,046, only the fifth time a club's average had surpassed 10,000 in recorded league history.

== Off-season ==
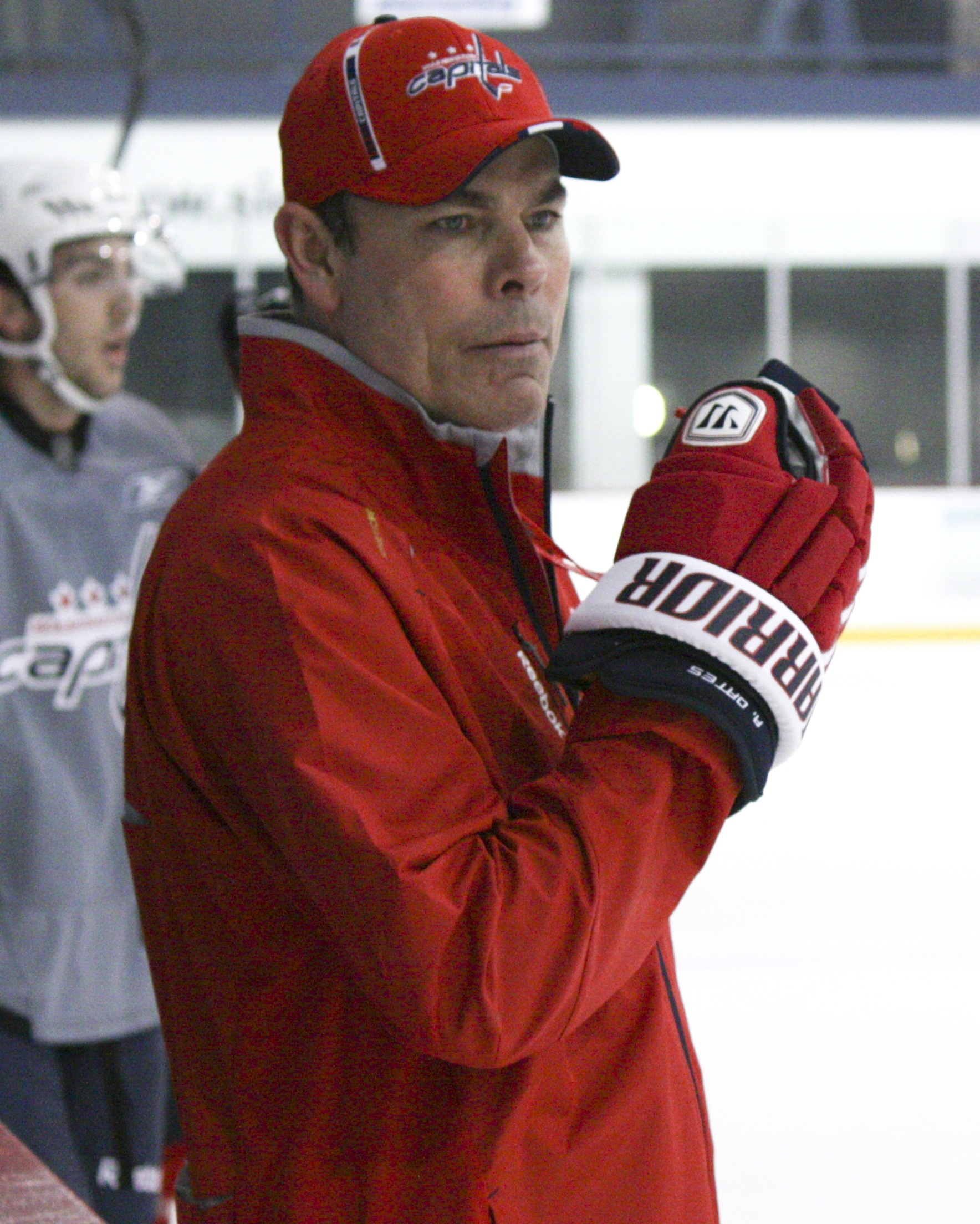
Due to the National Hockey League lockout, Washington Capitals coach Adam Oates (pictured) briefly served as Bears co-coach along with Mark French.

After several years of roster stability, the Hershey Bears lost several players during the off-season, including Keith Aucoin, Chris Bourque, Andrew Carroll, Sean Collins, Cody Eakin, Kyle Greentree, Christian Hanson, D. J. King, Jacob Micflikier, Graham Mink, Zach Miskovic, and Joel Rechlicz. The team obtained several new players through free agency, including Alex Berry, Matt Beaudoin, Matt Clackson, Jon DiSalvatore, Jon Kalinski, Steven Oleksy, Garrett Stafford, Ryan Stoa, and Jeff Taffe. Rookies Stan Galiev and Cameron Schilling joined the team, Mattias Sjögren returned from the Swedish Elite League, and Hershey also obtained Zach Hamill in a trade that sent Bourque to the Boston Bruins organization. Bears coach Mark French said the new roster made the season feel like "a change in era".

Like all American Hockey League teams, the Hershey Bears saw changes at the start of the season due to the National Hockey League lockout. Washington Capitals goaltender Braden Holtby and defenseman Dmitry Orlov joined the Bears roster due to the lockout, and Capitals head coach Adam Oates became co-coach of the Hershey team along with French. Oates' coaching staff also joined Oates and the team, including assistant coaches Calle Johansson and Tim Hunter, and video coach Brett Leonhardt. Bears goaltender Sergey Kostenko started the regular season on injured reserve due to off-season shoulder surgery, and winger Danick Paquette required surgery after breaking his right forearm during an October 6 exhibition game against the Wilkes-Barre/Scranton Penguins.

== Regular season ==
=== October ===
Hershey began its regular season with major offensive problems. They were outshot in 17 of their first 18 games, and were held to one or fewer goals in seven of those games. Their 6–10–1–0 start was the lowest total through 17 games since 2004–05, which was the last season they failed to make the playoffs. After losing their season opener to the Syracuse Crunch, the Bears beat the Binghamton Senators on October 19 despite being outshot 44 to 21. Hershey lost their first home game on October 20, falling 8–7 to the Rochester Americans; the 15-goal total marked the most combined goals from a Bears home opener, up from the previous record of 12 in 1987. Hershey center Ryan Potulny exited the game with an undisclosed injury, and would not return until November 16 after a nine-game absence. The team's defense improved in subsequent games, allowing two goals or fewer in four of their next five matches.

Hershey lost 2–1 in overtime against Binghamton on October 21. The game would have gone to a shootout, but under the first usage of the AHL's new video replay system at Giant Center, a Senators goal that had been overturned with 6.5 seconds left in overtime was restored. The Bears were held to a single goal in a second straight game in a 3–1 loss to Connecticut Whale on October 26, but the next day saw their first home win and first shutout victory of the season. They defeated the Albany Devils 3–0 and Holtby, who had been sidelined since the previous week by an upper body injury, made 35 saves. Forward T.J. Syner was recalled from the ECHL's Reading Royals and made his Hershey debut in that game. The Bears finished the month with a 3–2 victory against the Penguins on October 28, marking their first winning streak of the season. Orlov would miss the next four games due to an upper body injury, not returning until November 11.

=== November ===
Hershey defeated the Springfield Falcons 3–2 in a shootout on November 2, in which Boyd Kane and Matt Pope scored their first regulation goals of the season, and Galiev made the game-winner in the seventh round of the shootout, his first professional shootout attempt. In a subsequent 3–2 loss against the Bridgeport Sound Tigers on November 5, the Bears allowed a season-high 11 power plays, four of which were five-on-three. Hershey had 50 total penalty minutes in the game, compared to 115 minutes total in their first eight games. Stoa suffered an upper body injury that left him scratched until January 5. The Bears went 3-for-7 on the power play during a 3–1 victory against the Penguins on November 9, ending a 0-for-18 power play stretch; Holtby made 38 saves in the game. The Bears lost their next match 2–1 against the St. John's IceCaps on November 10. They were outshot 27 to 19, making a total of 359 to 266 for the season and putting them 29th out of 30 in the league in shots.

Hershey's offensive problems continued in a 3–1 loss against the Portland Pirates on November 11, in which they struggled to get the puck out of their zone and through the neutral zone. Holtby, who made 31 saves, said afterward, "We just seemed to look dead the last couple games." Kalinski suffered a hand injury and would not return until December 27. The Bears fell to Syracuse again on November 16. The 6–1 game, the most lopsided defeat of the season, was their third consecutive loss and third straight home game with only one goal. Hershey broke a three-game losing streak on November 17 with a 4–1 against the Penguins, where Garrett Mitchell scored two goals, including Hershey's first successful penalty shot since February 27, 2010. The team had surrendered two goals or fewer in eight of their past 14 games. But Hershey lost their next two games, including a 4–0 shutout loss to the Wilkes-Barre/Scranton on November 21. The Binghamton-based Internet radio Power Play Post Show reported from an anonymous source that Penguins head coach John Hynes put a $200 bounty on Bears defenseman Oleksy for that game, a claim Hynes strongly denied.

After the November 21 game, Oates announced he and his assistant coaches would no longer coach the Bears, giving full control of the team back to French and assistant coach Troy Mann. Hershey's offensive problems continued with a 3–1 loss against the Adirondack Phantoms, where they went 0-for-7 on the power play and saw their points percentage drop to .382, the worst in the Eastern Conference. However, they won five of their next six games starting with a 4–2 victory over the Toronto Marlies on November 25. The Bears' subsequent 5–2 win against the Norfolk Admirals on November 28 marked the start of a seven-game road winning streak that would not end until January 11. It was also just the second time in 19 games that they outshot their opponent, with 35 shots to Norfolk's 26. DiSalatore made two of the goals. The Norfolk match was Kane's 310th game with Hershey, placing him 39th in the teams' all-time games played list. The Bears won a third consecutive game against Bridgeport on November 30, against leading in shots 32 to 24. They won 5–2, scoring four goals in the third period, a season high for goals in a single period.

=== December ===
The Bears opened the month with a 5–1 loss against Norfolk on December 1, even though the Admirals allowed nine power plays. On December 4, DiSalvatore and Potulny were formally named alternate captains, ending the practice of rotating alternates throughout the season. Orlov suffered an upper body injury during Hershey's 2–1 victory against Norfolk on December 6, and did not return to Hershey until March 9. The Bears also won 5–4 against Wilkes-Barre/Scranton after Kevin Marshall, who had been a healthy scratch the day before, made his first Hershey goal in overtime for the win. The Bears lost 3–2 against the Hamilton Bulldogs, with Potulny scoring both Hershey goals, including a power play goal that ended the team's recent 0-for-19 power play record.

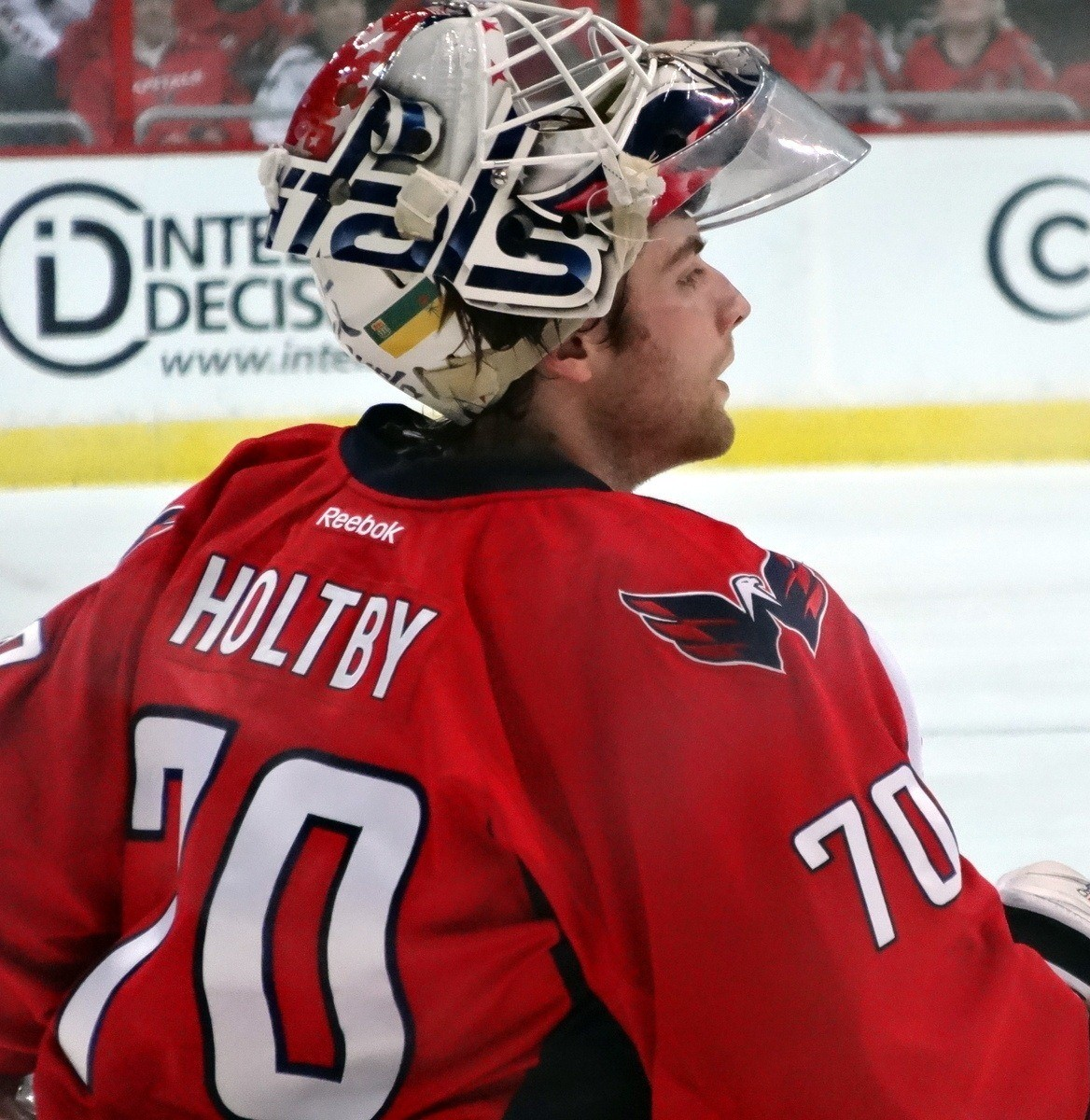
Braden Holtby, pictured here playing for the Washington Capitals, had four shutouts for the Bears and was named December's AHL Goaltender of the Month.

Hershey next won 2–1 against St. John's on December 11, in which Holtby the eighth goaltender in Hershey history to reach 70 victories. Taffe had two assists, tying him with Aucoin for second in the league for assists, and both Hershey goals came on the power play, marking the first time since November 9 they scored more than one power play goal in a game. Holtby had three shutout victories in the next five games, starting with a 4–0 win against St. John's on December 12. The Bears scored two power plays, marking the first time since the season's three opening games that the Bears scored power plays in three consecutive matches. Paquette and Kostenko were reassigned to ECHL's Reading Royals, and rookie winger Stanislav Galiev was recalled from Reading to the Bears. Holtby's next 4–0 shutout victory against Norfolk on December 19 moved him to fifth place in career Hershey shutouts with 13, and seventh place in regular season wins with 72.

Hershey went 0-for-9 in the power play in their subsequent 1–0 loss to Springfield on December 22, which ended a seven-game point streak for Taffe. Holtby's 2–0 shutout against Scranton on December 26 brought his record to 12–9–1, tying him for third in the league for wins; his four shutouts of the season tied him for second in the league. During a five-game span he stopped 154 of 158 shots, a .975 save percentage. With their sixth straight road win on December 27 against Wilkes-Barre/Scranton, Hershey saw a streak of 21 straight successful penalty kills end with a power play goal by the Penguins' Paul Thompson. Hershey lost their next three games, during which they went 0-for-11 on the power play. Although his shutout streak ended, Holtby made 89 combined saves during the losing streak. He was named AHL Goaltender of the Month for December, during which he had a .943 save percentage and allowed one goal or fewer in six of 10 starts.

=== January ===
With the end of the NHL lockout on January 6, Holtby and Schilling left Hershey for the Washington Capitals, which cleared the way for goaltender Philipp Grubauer to rejoin the Bears from ECHL's Reading Royals. The end of the lockout was believed to ultimately benefit Hershey because they retained more of their roster than most other AHL clubs. Tomáš Kundrátek scored two goals for Hershey in their 4–3 win against Bridgeport on January 8, including the unassisted game-winner with 25.6 seconds left in overtime. Dany Sabourin made 35 saves, marking his third straight win as starting goaltender. Hershey's seven-game road winning streak ended with a 1–0 loss to the Penguins on January 11, in which Taffe, Potulny and Evan Barlow all suffered lower body injuries. Despite their absences, the Bears beat Connecticut 4–3 the next day, where the line of Kalinski, Mitchell and Barry Almeida combined for two goals and six points. Hershey beat the Whale again on January 13 in a 5–0 shutout, scoring four goals in the first period including three power plays, which equaled 11.1 percent of their 27 power plays of the season thus far. Tom Poti scored one of the power play goals; it marked his first game since January 12, 2011 for the Washington Capitals due to a fractured pelvis that threatened to end his career.

The Bears won their third consecutive game on January 16 with a shootout victory over the Worcester Sharks. Grubauer stopped four of five shootout attempts by the Sharks, while Mitchell and Potulny scored on the shootout for the win. But that game was followed by a season-high four-game losing streak, which included a 2–1 overtime loss to Wilkes-Barre/Scranton at the AHL Outdoor Classic on January 20. Before a crowd of 17,311 at Hersheypark Stadium, Hershey kept the Penguins scoreless for two periods before they tied it in the third, then Paul Thompson scored a game-winning breakaway goal 1:19 into overtime. Their fourth straight loss against Binghamton on January 26 briefly took the Bears out of playoff contention in the Eastern Conference. The Bears ranked 22nd in the league for scoring, averaging 2.53 goals per game, and were last in league for shots on goal per game at 25.21. Their record was 0-for-15 when trailing in two periods, and 12 of their games so far had been one-goal decisions. However, the January 26 loss also started a seven-game point streak for the Bears, which included three wins and four overtime losses, three of which in a shootout. On January 31, the Bears obtained winger Peter LeBlanc in a trade for Beaudoin to the Chicago Blackhawks, and also received Casey Wellman in a trade for Hamill to the Florida Panthers.

=== February ===
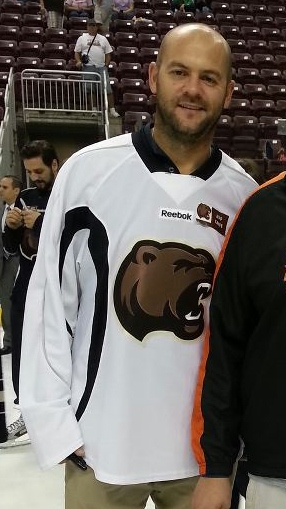
Jeff Taffe is the season's points leader for the Bears, leading in both goals and assists.

Hershey broke their four-game losing streak with a 2–1 victory against the Manchester Monarchs on February 2, making a season-high 44 shots on goal. LeBlanc and Wellman combined for 10 shots in their Hershey debuts, and LeBlanc scored one of the two goals. Hershey lost the next day to the Penguins, falling 2–1 in overtime after allowing a power play goal with 10.8 seconds left in overtime. In a 3–2 shootout win against the Lake Erie Monsters on February 5, Sabourin made 35 saves and the Bears killed seven power plays. They also defeated Binghamton 4–3 on February 9, scoring on two of eight power plays, better than their 1-for-11 power play record going into the game. Hershey lost 4–3 in a shootout against Norfolk on February 10, despite scoring three goals in the third period. Potulny made two of the goals, including the last with 34.4 seconds in regulation, marking his second multi-goal game of the season. Stoa also scored his second two-goal game of the season in the Bears' subsequent 4–3 loss against Norfolk on February 10, which marked the team's third consecutive shootout loss.

Hershey's seven-game point streak ended on February 16 with a 2–1 loss against Toronto. It was also their eighth one-goal game, tying them with the Houston Aeros for the season's most one-goal contests in the league. In a 4–1 win against Rochester the next day, Grubauer blocked 35 shots, marking his personal high in the American Hockey League and the third time this season he held an opponent to one goal in regulation. The Bears defeated Binghamton 5–4 in a shootout on February 22, rallying from a two-goal deficit in the third period and killing nine of the Senators' 10 power plays. The victory was one of only two victories, both shootouts, in the past 18 games where Hershey trailed after two periods. Taffe scored two power play goals for his first two-goal game for the Bears, and McNeill's three assists move his career points total to 146, making him eighth in all-time scoring among Hershey defensemen. Grubauer earned his AHL shutout for the Bears with a 3–0 win February 23 against Adirondack, making a season high-tying 40 saves. The game brought Hershey's penalty kill record in 10 games to 42-for-46, or 91.3 percent, bringing their overall penalty kill to eighth best in the league. The Bears lost 6–4 in Albany on February 24, which was also the third straight game Hershey scored two power play goals. They were scored by Stol and Potulny, who had each had five goals in their last six and seven games, respectively. Wellman also scored two goals in the game.

=== March ===
The Bears won their first three contests from March 1 to 3. Although it marked their fourth three-game winning streak of the season, it was their first time winning on three consecutive days, and first winning three in a row at home. The streak started with a 3–2 victory against the Penguins, scoring three goals in the first half of the first period. They were outshot 34 to 15, which tied for Bears' lowest total shots in a game. Grubauer was recalled to the Washington Capitals on March 7 to substitute for an ill Michal Neuvirth. He stopped 40 of 45 shots in 5–2 loss to the New York Islanders in his first NHL start on March 9, and was returned to the Bears the next day after Neuvirth recovered. The Bears' lost their next three straight games, including two back-to-back losses against Norfolk in which they were held to one goal. Those losses placed them in danger of losing playoff contention, tying them with Connecticut for seventh, with Albany and Manchester each one point behind. It was also the first time this season the Bears lost a game in regulation that it led after two periods. The team's losing streak ended with a 1–0 victory against Bridgeport on March 17, when Mitchell scored a game-winning overtime goal.

Hershey faced a challenging schedule for the end of its regular season, with only three of the last 14 games scheduled for home. This marked the fewest in team history, with a previous low of five games in the final 14 of 2002–03. The team also experienced significant roster changes in March, with Orlov, Oleksy and Schilling all being recalled to the Washington Capitals. Almeida and Kostenko were reassigned to the Reading Royals, Nicolas Deschamps joined the Bears roster, and Kevin Marshall was for defenseman Chay Genoway. Capitals winger Joey Crabb also cleared waivers and was assigned to Hershey on March 23. The Bears ended a two-game losing streak with a 4–1 victory over Worcester on March 24, but lost 5–3 on March 29 to Albany, who had just lost six consecutive games. Grubauer was replaced by Sabourin after surrendering three shots on seven goals. Hershey defeated Providence 3–2 the next day, rallying with two goals in the final 12 minutes. It marked the first time this season the Bears had won a game after trailing for two periods.

=== April ===
April brought further roster changes for the Hershey Bears, with Joel Rechlicz rejoining the team in exchange for Matt Clackson, and Stafford being traded for winger Dane Byers. Forward Michael Latta was also traded to Hershey, meaning the team had added seven new players to the roster via trades since January 31. The April trades were intended to add forward speed and depth to the team, but a late NHL trade deadline resulting from the lockout left only nine james to meld the new players into the line-up. After beating Syracuse 4–1 on April 5, Hershey fell into a four-game losing slump that briefly knocked them out of playoff contention. The first of those games, a 2–1 loss against Syracuse at home, drew a season-high attendance of 10,943. However, by April 12, a loss against Providence knocked them into ninth place, and last place in the East Division. Another loss the next day to Manchester left them tied with the Monarchs for last place at 75 points, a full four points behind Connecticut and Norfolk to get back into the running for the playoffs.

The Bears ended their win drought with a 5–3 victory against Portland. After having gone one-for-18 on the power play in the previous five games, Hershey scored a season-high five power play goals against the Pirates, including a hat trick by Crabb. Taffe recorded five assists, the team's season-high points total for a single game. Another victory against Adirondack on April 19 placed Herhsey back into playoff contention, tying them with Manchester, Norfolk and Connecticut at 79 points in the race for the final two spots. The Bears clinched the eighth and final seed by defeating Manchester 4–2 in their final regular season game on April 21. Taffe finished the regular season the second-highest scorer in the league with 18 goals, finishing behind the Rockford IceHogs' Brandon Pirri at 22 goals. Taffe and Pirri tied for the league high in assists at 53. Taffe was also named the team's Most Valuable Player and made the AHL's 2012-13 second all-star squad. The Bears finished the regular season with a home attendance total of 381,764 and a club-record average of 10,046. This marked only the fifth time an AHL club had averaged more than 10,000 since records started being kept in 1962, and the first time since the then-Philadelphia Phantoms in 1999–2000. Boyd Kane was named the club's Man of the Year.

== Calder Cup playoffs ==
The Bears faced the top-seeded Providence Bruins in the best-of-five first round, marking the eighth consecutive year Hershey made the Calder Cup playoffs. It also marked the sixth AHL playoff meeting between the two teams, with Hershey winning four of the previous five, losing only in the 1949 finals. The Bruins led the league in wins (5) and points (105) for the 2012–13 regular season, and no team had beaten the AHL's regular season points leader in the first round of the playoffs since the Cornwall Aces in 1996. The Providence roster featured three former Hershey forwards: Chris Bourque, Christian Hanson and Graham Mink. Defenseman Patrick McNeill did not play for Hershey during the playoff series due to veteran roster limit issues.

Hershey won the first game 5–2 on April 26, with Crabb opening scoring with a power play goal, and the Bears taking a 4–0 lead by the second period, resulting in Providence goaltender Niklas Svedberg being pulled from the game. The victory marked Hershey's first game one win in a playoff series since defeating Manchester in the 2009–10 Eastern Conference finals. The Bears also won their second game 5–4 on April 28, with Grubauer making 54 saves, eight short of matching the team's playoff record. The Bruins allowed 64 shots, which were six short of Hershey's highest in a playoff game. Hershey was losing 4–3 in the third, their first time trailing in the series, but Grubauer was pulled for an extra attacker and Crabb tied the game with 91 seconds in regulation, allowing DiSalvatore to score the game-winner in overtime on a power play. Hershey's 5-for-10 power play record ranked the highest in the Calder Cup playoffs at the time.

If the Bruins were swept, it would have marked the first time an overall top-seed was swept from the opening round of the playoffs since the Cleveland Barons ousted the Buffalo Bisons in 1954. But the Bruins fought off elimination with a 5–1 victory in game three on May 4, where Bourque scored two goals and one assists against his former team. Despite scoring the first goal for the third straight game, Hershey failed to score on any of its six power plays, including a five-on-three that lasted a full two minutes. Providence also won a dramatic fourth game on May 5. Trailing 4–3 in the third period, the Bruins stunned Hershey by scoring two goals in the final four minutes, including Carter Camper completing a hat trick with his game-winner with 64 seconds left in the game. Hershey were eliminated from the playoffs after losing the fifth and final game by 3–2. Crabb tied the game 2–2 in the third with his fifth goal of the series, but Bruins forward Jamie Tardif broke the tie at 9:20 of the period. The Bears finished the period with a six-on-four advantage but could not score.

This marked the third consecutive year Hershey was eliminated in the first round of the Calder Cup playoffs. They became the tenth team in AHL history to be eliminated after winning the first two games of a best-of-five series; the last was the Lowell Lock Monsters, who lost to St. John's Maple Leafs in 2002. The road team won every game of the Bears and Bruins series. The only other time that had happened in AHL history was in 1995, when the Fredericton Canadiens eliminated the St. John's Maple Leafs. Hershey finished the season with a league-worst average of 26.42 shots on goal per game, and a total of 204 goals, the team's lowest since 2003–04.

== Postseason ==
On May 17, Bears President Doug Yingst and Washington Capitals General Manager George McPhee announced they would not renew the contract of head coach Mark French. French spent four seasons with Hershey, making the playoffs every time and winning the Calder Cup in 2009. He was the fifth winningest Hershey Bears coach at 180 wins, which was one win behind the fourth winningest, John Paddock. French subsequently became head coach of KHL Medveščak Zagreb for the Kontinental Hockey League. Several people were identified as possible candidates to succeed French, including Troy Mann, Paul Jerrard, Mike Stothers, Eric Veilleux and Larry Courville. After a search, it was announced on June 18 that Mike Haviland had been chosen for the position. Yingst said Haviland was chosen because it was believed he could improve Hershey's home record and create a tougher, more aggressive, "in your face" team. Haviland had applied for the Washington Capitals head coach position the year prior, but Oates was selected instead.

After four years as Hershey's assistant coach, Mann accepted a job as head coach of ECHL's Bakersfield Condors on June 21. Mann had reinterviewed for his position with the Bears and felt it went well, but said he faced a deadline to accept the Bakersfield job and could not turn it down. Ryan Mougenel was signed as Mann's replacement on July 5. He had previously worked with Haviland, when Mougenel was alternate captain on and Haviland was head coach of the ECHL's Atlantic City Boardwalk Bullies in 2002–03, the year the team won the Kelly Cup.

The post season saw several players depart the Hershey Bears line-up. Immediately after Hershey was eliminated from the playoffs, the Washington Capitals recalled Joey Crabb and Tom Wilson for their Stanley Cup run; Crabb later signed with NHL's Florida Panthers. After 365 games with Hershey and playing as captain since 2001, Boyd Kane left the Hershey Bears for Medveščak Zagreb in Croatia, reuniting with French. Sabourin left the Bears for the Graz 99ers of the Austrian Hockey League, and McNeill, who was limited to 47 games in the 2012–13 season due to veteran roster limits, signed a one-year two-way contract with the Columbus Blue Jackets. Potulny signed with the KHL's Avangard Omsk, Pope joined the Aalborg Pirates in Denmark, and Sjögren departed for the Linköpings Hockey Club in the Swedish Hockey League.

Byers, Rechlicz, Stoa, Syner and Wellar were all re-signed for the 2013–14 season, and Deschamps and LeBlanc received qualifying offers from the Washington Capitals. It was announced June 14 that Taffe re-signed with the Bears. The Swedish Hockey League had announced one month earlier that Taffe had signed a contract with them, but Taffe said that announcement had been premature, and he wanted to keep his family in North America. In July, the Bears signed four free agents to one-year contracts: defenseman Tyson Strachan, winger Matt Watkins, forward Derek Whitmore and goaltender David Leggio. For the 2013–14 season, Hershey signed defenseman David Kolomatis, Nate Schmidt, and Jaynen Rissling, as well as goaltender Riley Gill, and forwards Josh Brittain, Dustin Gazley, Brandon Segal, and Jamie Johnson, a former linemate of Taffe's with the Rochester Americans.

== Standings ==
y– indicates team has clinched division and a playoff spot
x– indicates team has clinched a playoff spot
e– indicates team has been eliminated from playoff contention

=== Divisional standings ===
East Division	GP	W	L	OTL	SOL	Pts	GF	GA
y–Syracuse Crunch (TB)	76	43	22	6	5	97	247	201
x–Binghamton Senators (OTT)	76	44	24	1	7	96	227	188
x–Wilkes-Barre/Scranton Penguins (PIT)	76	42	30	2	2	88	185	178
x–Hershey Bears (WSH)	76	36	31	3	6	81	204	196
e–Norfolk Admirals (ANA)	76	37	34	4	1	79	188	207

=== Conference standings ===
Eastern Conference	Div	GP	W	L	OTL	SOL	Pts	GF	GA
y–Providence Bruins (BOS)	AT	76	50	21	0	5	105	222	183
y–Springfield Falcons (CBJ)	NE	76	45	22	5	4	99	235	186
y–Syracuse Crunch (TB)	ET	76	43	22	6	5	97	247	201
x–Binghamton Senators (OTT)	ET	76	44	24	1	7	96	227	188
x–Wilkes-Barre/Scranton Penguins (PIT)	ET	76	42	30	2	2	88	185	178
x–Portland Pirates (PHX)	AT	76	41	30	3	2	87	230	233
x–Manchester Monarchs (LA)	AT	76	37	32	3	4	81	219	209
x–Hershey Bears (WSH)	ET	76	36	31	3	6	81	204	196
e–Connecticut Whale (NYR)	NE	76	35	32	6	3	79	213	222
e–Norfolk Admirals (ANA)	ET	76	37	34	4	1	79	188	207
e–Bridgeport Sound Tigers (NYI)	NE	76	32	32	7	5	76	218	242
e–Albany Devils (NJ)	NE	76	31	32	1	12	75	193	225
e–Worcester Sharks (SJ)	AT	76	31	34	4	7	73	191	228
e–St. John's IceCaps (WPG)	AT	76	32	36	3	5	72	195	237
e–Adirondack Phantoms (PHI)	NE	76	31	38	3	4	69	187	223

Divisions: AT – Atlantic, NE – Northeast, ET – East

== Schedule and results ==
=== Regular season ===
2012–13 Game Log – Regular season

October: 3–3–1–0 (Home: 2–1–1–0; Road: 1–2–0–0)
#	Date	Visitor	Score	Home	OT	Decision	Attendance	Record	Pts	Gamesheet
1	October 13	Hershey	3–4	Syracuse		Holtby	6,434	0–1–0–0	0	Gamesheet
2	October 19	Hershey	3–2	Binghamton		Sabourin	2,725	1–1–0–0	2	Gamesheet
3	October 20	Rochester	8–7	Hershey		Sabourin	9,704	1–2–0–0	2	Gamesheet
4	October 21	Binghamtom	1–2	Hershey	OT	Grubauer	9,802	1–2–1–0	3	Gamesheet
5	October 26	Hershey	1–3	Connecticut		Sabourin	3,072	1–3–1–0	3	Gamesheet
6	October 27	Albany	0–3	Hershey		Holtby	8,189	2–3–1–0	5	Gamesheet
7	October 28	WB/Scranton	2–3	Hershey		Sabourin	7,874	3–3–1–0	7	Gamesheet

November: 6–7–0–0 (Home: 4–4–0–0; Road: 2–3–0–0)
#	Date	Visitor	Score	Home	OT	Decision	Attendance	Record	Pts	Gamesheet
8	November 2	Springfield	2–3	Hershey	SO	Holtby	3,489	4–3–1–0	9	Gamesheet
9	November 3	Hershey	2–3	Bridgeport		Holtby	8,525	4–4–1–0	9	Gamesheet
10	November 9	Hershey	3–1	WB/Scranton		Holtby	5,048	5–4–1–0	11	Gamesheet
11	November 10	St. John's	2–1	Hershey		Sabourin	8,726	5–5–1–0	11	Gamesheet
12	November 11	Portland	3–1	Hershey		Holtby	7,810	5–6–1–0	11	Gamesheet
13	November 16	Hershey	1–6	Syracuse		Sabourin	4,820	5–7–1–0	11	Gamesheet
14	November 17	WB/Scranton	1–4	Hershey		Holtby	10,082	6–7–1–0	13	Gamesheet
15	November 18	Syracuse	5–3	Hershey		Holtby	8,006	6–8–1–0	13	Gamesheet
16	November 21	WB/Scranton	4–0	Hershey		Holtby	10,044	6–9–1–0	13	Gamesheet
17	November 24	Hershey	1–3	Adirondack		Sabourin	4,132	6–10–1–0	13	Gamesheet
18	November 25	Toronto	2–4	Hershey		Holtby	8,659	7–10–1–0	15	Gamesheet
19	November 28	Hershey	5–2	Norfolk		Holtby	3,176	8–10–1–0	17	Gamesheet
20	November 30	Bridgeport	2–5	Hershey		Holtby	8,594	9–10–1–0	19	Gamesheet

December: 7–4–0–1 (Home: 2–4–0–1; Road: 5–0–0–0)
#	Date	Visitor	Score	Home	OT	Decision	Attendance	Record	Pts	Gamesheet
21	December 1	Norfolk	5–1	Hershey		Holtby	10,216	9–11–1–0	19	Gamesheet
22	December 6	Hershey	2–1	Norfolk		Holtby	18,506	10–11–1–0	21	Gamesheet
23	December 7	Hershey	5–4	WB/Scranton	OT	Sabourin	5,042	11–11–1–0	23	Gamesheet
24	December 8	Hamilton	3–2	Hershey		Holtby	9,411	11–12–1–0	23	Gamesheet
25	December 11	Hershey	2–1	St. John's		Holtby	6,287	12–12–1–0	25	Gamesheet
26	December 12	Hershey	4–0	St. John's		Holtby	6,287	13–12–1–0	27	Gamesheet
27	December 15	Worcester	4–3	Hershey	SO	Holtby	10,075	13–12–1–1	28	Gamesheet
28	December 19	Norfolk	0–4	Hershey		Holtby	10,936	14–12–1–1	30	Gamesheet
29	December 22	Springfield	1–0	Hershey		Holtby	9,139	14–13–1–1	30	Gamesheet
30	December 26	WB/Scranton	0–2	Hershey		Holtby	10,162	15–13–1–1	32	Gamesheet
31	December 27	Hershey	4–1	WB/Scranton		Sabourin	6,378	16–13–1–1	34	Gamesheet
32	December 29	Albany	3–2	Hershey		Holtby	10,896	16–14–1–1	34	Gamesheet

January: 4–5–1–1 (Home: 2–4–1–0; Road: 2–1–0–1)
#	Date	Visitor	Score	Home	OT	Decision	Attendance	Record	Pts	Gamesheet
33	January 5	Binghamtom	3–1	Hershey		Holtby	9,912	16–15–1–1	34	Gamesheet
34	January 6	Worcester	2–1	Hershey		Holtby	10,168	16–16–1–1	34	Gamesheet
35	January 8	Hershey	4–3	Bridgeport	OT	Sabourin	4,918	17–16–1–1	36	Gamesheet
36	January 11	Hershey	0–1	WB/Scranton		Sabourin	6,024	17–17–1–1	36	Gamesheet
37	January 12	Connecticut	3–4	Hershey	SO	Grubauer	10,409	18–17–1–1	38	Gamesheet
38	January 13	Connecticut	0–5	Hershey		Sabourin	10,452	19–17–1–1	40	Gamesheet
39	January 16	Hershey	3–2	Worcester	SO	Grubauer	3,067	20–17–1–1	42	Gamesheet
40	January 18	Lake Erie	3–2	Hershey		Grubauer	9,308	20–18–1–1	42	Gamesheet
41	January 20	WB/Scranton	2–1	Hershey	OT	Sabourin	17,311	20–18–2–1	43	Gamesheet
42	January 25	St. John's	3–1	Hershey		Grubauer	9,103	20–19–2–1	43	Gamesheet
43	January 26	Hershey	2–3	Binghamton	SO	Sabourin	4,617	20–19–2–2	44	Gamesheet

February: 5–2–1–3 (Home: 3–0–1–1; Road: 2–2–0–2)
#	Date	Visitor	Score	Home	OT	Decision	Attendance	Record	Pts	Gamesheet
44	February 2	Manchester	1–2	Hershey		Grubauer	10,672	21–19–2–2	46	Gamesheet
45	February 3	WB/Scranton	2–1	Hershey	OT	Sabourin	9,523	21–19–3–2	47	Gamesheet
46	February 5	Hershey	3–2	Lake Erie	SO	Sabourin	4,245	22–19–3–2	49	Gamesheet
47	February 9	Binghamton	3–4	Hershey		Grubauer	10,368	23–19–3–2	51	Gamesheet
48	February 10	Norfolk	4–3	Hershey	SO	Sabourin	9,425	23–19–3–3	52	Gamesheet
49	February 15	Hershey	2–3	Hamilton	SO	Grubauer	4,287	23–19–3–4	53	Gamesheet
50	February 16	Hershey	1–2	Toronto		Sabourin	5,814	23–20–3–4	53	Gamesheet
51	February 17	Hershey	4–1	Rochester		Grubauer	7,683	24–20–3–4	55	Gamesheet
52	February 22	Hershey	4–5	Binghamton	SO	Sabourin	3,156	24–20–3–5	56	Gamesheet
53	February 23	Adirondack	0–3	Hershey		Grubauer	10,906	25–20–3–5	58	Gamesheet
54	February 24	Hershey	4–6	Albany		Grubauer	3,999	25–21–3–5	58	Gamesheet

March: 7–5–0–1 (Home: 5–1–0–0; Road: 2–4–0–1)
#	Date	Visitor	Score	Home	OT	Decision	Attendance	Record	Pts	Gamesheet
59	March 1	Hershey	3–2	WB/Scranton		Sabourin	7,417	26–21–3–5	60	Gamesheet
60	March 2	Norfolk	2–3	Hershey		Grubauer	10,502	27–21–3–5	62	Gamesheet
61	March 3	Syracuse	3–5	Hershey		Grubauer	10,586	28–21–3–5	64	Gamesheet
62	March 8	Hershey	1–5	Norfolk		Sabourin	5,626	28–22–3–5	64	Gamesheet
63	March 9	Hershey	1–4	Norfolk		Sabourin	7,316	28–23–3–5	64	Gamesheet
64	March 10	Binghamton	3–2	Hershey		Grubauer	10,367	28–24–3–5	64	Gamesheet
65	March 16	Bridgeport	0–1	Hershey	OT	Grubauer	10,825	29–24–3–5	66	Gamesheet
66	March 17	Adirondack	2–5	Hershey		Grubauer	10,856	30-24-3-5	68	Gamesheet
67	March 22	Hershey	2–3	Connecticut	SO	Grubauer	5,854	30–24–3–6	69	Gamesheet
68	March 23	Hershey	4–6	Manchester		Grubauer	7,755	30–25–3–6	69	Gamesheet
69	March 24	Hershey	4–1	Worcester		Sabourin	4,917	31–25–3–6	71	Gamesheet
70	March 29	Hershey	3–5	Albany		Sabourin	2,814	31–25–3–6	71	Gamesheet
71	March 30	Providence	2–3	Hershey		Grubauer	10,819	32–25–3–6	73	Gamesheet

April: 4–5–0–0 (Home: 1–1–0–0; Road: 3–4–0–0)
#	Date	Visitor	Score	Home	OT	Decision	Attendance	Record	Pts	Gamesheet
72	April 5	Hershey	4–1	Syracuse		Grubauer	5,491	33–26–3–6	75	Gamesheet
73	April 6	Syracuse	2–1	Hershey		Sabourin	10,943	33–27–3–6	75	Gamesheet
74	April 7	Hershey	3–5	WB/Scranton		Grubauer	7,125	33–28–3–6	75	Gamesheet
75	April 12	Hershey	2–3	Providence		Grubauer	10,714	33–29–3–6	75	Gamesheet
76	April 13	Hershey	3–4	Manchester		Sabourin	6,860	33–30–3–6	75	Gamesheet
77	April 14	Hershey	5–3	Portland		Grubauer	5,606	34–30–3–6	77	Gamesheet
78	April 19	Hershey	2–1	Adirondack		Grubauer	3,362	35–30–3–6	79	Gamesheet
79	April 20	Hershey	2–4	Binghamton		Grubauer	4,341	35–31–3–6	79	Gamesheet
80	April 21	Manchester	2–4	Hershey		Grubauer	4,341	36–31–3–6	81	Gamesheet

Legend: Win (2 points) Loss (0 points) Overtime/shootout loss (1-point)

=== Playoffs ===
2013 Game Log – Playoffs

Eastern Conference Quarter-finals: vs. (1) Providence Bruins – Bruins win series 3–2)
#	Date	Visitor	Score	Home	OT	Decision	Attendance	Series	Gamesheet
1	April 26	Hershey	4–3	Providence		Grubauer	6,541	1–0	Gamesheet
2	April 28	Hershey	5–4	Providence	OT	Grubauer	4,954	2–0	Gamesheet
3	May 4	Providence	5–1	Hershey		Grubauer	10,076	2–1	Gamesheet
4	May 5	Providence	5–4	Hershey		Grubauer	5,042	2–2	Gamesheet
5	May 8	Hershey	2–3	Providence		Grubauer	4,175	2–3	Gamesheet

Legend: Win Loss

== Player statistics ==
=== Skaters ===
Note: GP = Games played; G = Goals; A = Assists; Pts = Points; +/− = Plus/minus; PIM = Penalty minutes
Updated as of May 8, 2013

Regular season
Player	GP	G	A	Pts	+/-	PIM
Jeff Taffe	73	18	53	71	0	27
Casey Wellman^{†}	33	9	21	30	−2	4
Jon DiSalvatore	68	18	31	49	−13	24
Ryan Potulny	66	19	22	41	−2	30
Michael Latta^{†}	9	1	2	3	−3	14
Boyd Kane	74	15	22	37	11	66
Tomas Kundratek	49	16	15	31	−10	26
Garrett Mitchell	75	15	15	30	6	94
Peter LeBlanc^{†}	33	8	10	18	−2	4
Chay Genoway^{†}	12	1	5	6	3	8
Nicolas Deschamps^{†}	16	3	4	7	−3	29
Zach Hamill^{‡}	40	11	11	22	8	34
Garrett Stafford^{‡}	48	1	20	21	−5	36
Ryan Stoa	48	1	20	21	−5	43
Patrick McNeill	47	4	13	17	−2	16
Dmitry Orlov	31	3	14	17	−2	20
Cameron Schilling^{*}	70	7	9	16	5	61
Barry Almeida^{*}	35	6	8	14	0	10
Steven Oleksy^{‡}	55	2	12	14	5	151
Joey Crabb^{†}	12	6	6	12	5	6
Dane Byers^{†}	5	0	0	0	−1	11
Mike Carman	62	4	6	10	−1	20
Mathieu Beaudoin^{‡}	32	3	7	10	6	2
Mattias Sjögren	32	3	5	8	−4	12
T.J. Snyer^{*}	36	3	4	7	1	15
Matt Pope	48	2	5	7	0	17
Julien Brouillette	61	2	5	7	9	35
Jonathon Kalinski	27	1	5	6	−1	23
Evan Barlow^{‡}	20	2	3	5	−3	12
Kevin Marshall^{‡}	52	1	4	5	5	77
Alex Berry	19	2	2	4	−1	40
Nate Schmidt^{*}	8	1	3	4	−4	2
Matt Clackson^{‡}	19	1	2	3	−1	36
Tom Poti^{‡}	2	1	0	1	−1	36
Brett Flemming^{*}	11	0	1	1	−4	2
Stanislav Galiev^{‡}	17	0	1	1	−4	8
Patrick Wellar	19	0	1	1	2	52
Danick Paquette^{*}	2	0	0	0	−1	5

Playoffs
Player	GP	G	A	Pts	+/-	PIM
Peter LeBlanc	5	0	8	8	4	0
Joey Crabb	5	5	0	5	0	2
Jeff Taffe	5	0	4	4	−2	2
Casey Wellman	5	3	0	3	−2	2
Michael Latta	5	2	1	3	0	6
Dmitry Orlov	4	1	2	3	0	4
Nicolas Deschamps	5	1	2	3	1	2
Julien Brouillette	5	0	3	3	−1	0
Jon DiSalvatore	4	2	0	2	0	2
Ryan Potulny	5	0	2	2	−4	2
Nate Schmidt^{*}	5	0	2	2	1	0
Tom Wilson^{*}	3	1	0	1	−1	6
Ryan Stoa	4	1	0	1	1	0
Garrett Mitchell	5	1	0	1	0	4
Dane Byers	1	0	1	1	0	0
Matt Pope	3	0	1	1	2	0
Tomas Kundratek	5	0	1	1	−1	2
Cameron Schilling^{*}	5	0	1	1	−3	4
Chay Genoway	1	0	0	0	0	4
Boyd Kane	5	0	0	0	−8	2
Patrick Wellar	5	0	0	0	−2	22

^{†}Denotes player spent time with another team before joining team. Stats reflect time with the team only.
^{‡}Left the team mid-season
^{*}Rookie

=== Goaltenders ===
Note: GP = Games played; TOI = Time on ice; W = Wins; L = Losses; GA = Goals against; GAA = Goals against average; SV = Saves; SA = Shots against; SV% = Save percentage; SO = Shutouts; G = Goals; A = Assists; PIM = Penalty minutes
Updated as of May 8, 2013

Regular season
Player	GP	TOI	W	L	GA	GAA	SV	SA	SV%	SO	G	A	PIM
Philipp Grubauer^{*}	28	1,623:46	15	9	61	2.25	695	756	.919	2	0	0	0
Braden Holtby^{‡}	25	1,457:50	12	12	52	2.14	712	764	.932	4	0	0	0
Dany Sabourin	28	1,520:56	9	13	69	2.72	639	708	.903	0	0	1	4
Totals		4,602:32	36	34	182	2.37	2,046	2,228	.918	6	0	1	4

Playoffs
Player	GP	TOI	W	L	GA	GAA	SV	SA	SV%	SO	G	A	PIM
Philipp Grubauer^{*}	5	300:44	2	3	19	3.79	173	192	.901	0	0	0	0

^{‡}Left the team mid-season
^{*}Rookie

== Milestones ==
Player	Milestone	Reached
Cameron Schilling	1st regular season AHL goal	October 19, 2012
Boyd Kane	300th Hershey Bears game	November 3, 2012
Jon DiSalvatore	500th career AHL game	November 25, 2012
Boyd Kane	900th career AHL game	January 11, 2013
Julien Brouillette	200th career AHL game	January 26, 2013
Patrick McNeill	300th Hershey Bears game	February 2, 2013
Boyd Kane	500th career AHL point 100th Hershey Bears goal	March 23, 2013
Jeff Taffe	500th career AHL point	March 23, 2013

Preceded by 2011–12 AHL season	2012–13 AHL season	Succeeded by 2013–14 AHL season
