= Bankwell =

Bankwell is a surname. Notable people with the surname include:

- John de Bankwell (died 1308), English judge
- Roger de Bankwell (c. 1340), English commissioner and judge

== See also ==
- Banwell (surname)
