= Banwell (surname) =

Banwell is a surname. In some rare cases, it may be spelled Banewell. Notable people with the surname include:

- Martin Banwell (born 1954), New Zealand chemist
- Mike Banwell (born 1987), Canadian ice hockey player
- Tex Banwell (1917–1999), British soldier
