= Julien Brouillette =

Canadian ice hockey player (born 1986)

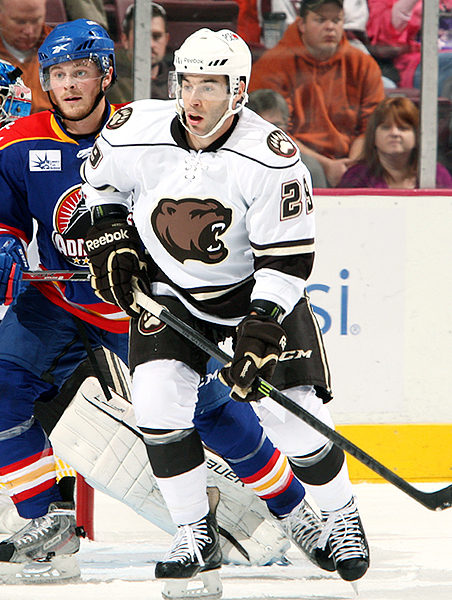
- Brouillette (right) with the Hershey Bears in 2013
- Born: December 5, 1986 (age 39) Saint-Esprit, Quebec, Canada
- Height: 5 ft 11 in (180 cm)
- Weight: 185 lb (84 kg; 13 st 3 lb)
- Position: Defence
- Shot: Left
- Played for: Washington Capitals; Winnipeg Jets; Karlskrona HK; EC Red Bull Salzburg
- NHL draft: Undrafted
- Playing career: 2007–2018

Julien Brouillette (born December 5, 1986) is a Canadian former professional ice hockey defenseman who played in the National Hockey League (NHL) with the Washington Capitals and Winnipeg Jets.

== Playing career ==
As a youth, Brouillette played in the 2000 Quebec International Pee-Wee Hockey Tournament with a minor ice hockey team from Lanaudière.

In 2007, he turned professional signing as an undrafted player with the Columbia Inferno of the ECHL going with the team into the playoffs. In 2008, he signed with the Charlotte Checkers of the ECHL. He played there for two seasons and the team went to the playoffs both years. During the 2009 season, he played for both the Providence Bruins and Hartford Wolf Pack of the AHL.

In the 2010–11 season Brouillette signed with the Greenville Road Warriors of the ECHL. On December 14, he was loaned to the Lake Erie Monsters of the AHL and signed a Professional Tryout with the team. On January 23, 2011, he was signed to a Standard Players Contract with the Monsters ending his contract with the Road Warriors. He remained with the Monsters for the duration of the season, posting career highs of 2 goals and 19 points in 49 games. Following the Monsters first round elimination, Brouillette was returned to the Road Warriors on loan to play in their final post season game.

On July 11, 2011, Brouillette was signed to a one-year contract with the Hershey Bears of the AHL for the 2011–12 season. In playing a career high 74 games, Brouillette was a fixture on the Bears defense, to post 7 goals and 21 points. In the 2012–13 season, his second within the Bears organization, Brouillette was reassigned to ECHL affiliate, the Reading Royals, to begin the year as a flow on effect of the NHL lockout. After 1 game with the Royals, Brouillette was recalled to Hershey and reclaimed his position to contribute with 7 points in 61 contests.

On April 5, 2013, Brouillette signed his first NHL contract, a one-year deal with NHL affiliate, the Washington Capitals, for the following 2013–14 season. Midway through the season whilst with the Bears, Brouillette received his first ever NHL recall by the Capitals on February 6, 2014. He made his long-awaited NHL debut the following night, providing a primary assist in a 4–2 victory over the Winnipeg Jets in Washington. In his second game, Brouillette scored his first NHL goal, which stood as the game-winner in a 3–0 victory over the New Jersey Devils on February 8, 2014.

On August 8, 2014, Brouillette signed as a free agent to a one-year, two-way contract with the Winnipeg Jets. After competing in the Jets training camp, Brouillette was assigned to AHL affiliate, the St. John's IceCaps to begin the 2014–15 season. Brouillette would play the majority of the season with the IceCaps, however earned a recall to feature in one game with the Jets.

On June 1, 2015, approaching free-agency, Brouillette opted to leave the NHL and sign his first European contract on a one-year deal with newly promoted Swedish club, Karlskrona HK of the Swedish Hockey League (SHL). In his only season abroad in the 2015–16 season, Brouillette captained Karlskrona and appeared in 52 games, contributing with 5 goals and 17 points from the blueline.

Brouillette opted to return to his native Canada as a free agent in the following summer. Unable to attract interest to sign in the NHL, Brouillette initially agreed to a one-month contract in the LNAH with Saint-Georges Cool FM 103.5 on September 16, 2016. He featured in 8 games with Saint-Georges before he signed a professional try-out deal to return to the St. John's IceCaps of the AHL, now an affiliate to the Montreal Canadiens on November 4, 2016.

On July 16, 2017, he signed with EC Red Bull Salzburg of the Austrian Hockey League (EBEL). In the 2017–18 season, Brouillette as Salzburg's top pairing defenseman led the blueline in scoring with 12 goals and 34 points in 52 games. In the post-season, Brouillette helped Salzburg reach the final as Austrian Champions, before losing in game 7 to HC Bolzano.

Brouillette opted to end his 11-year professional career following the conclusion of his contract with Salzburg on April 24, 2018.

== Career statistics ==
			Regular season					Playoffs
Season	Team	League	GP	G	A	Pts	PIM	GP	G	A	Pts	PIM
2003–04	Chicoutimi Saguenéens	QMJHL	24	0	0	0	7	18	0	4	4	0
2004–05	Chicoutimi Saguenéens	QMJHL	65	7	11	18	61	17	4	4	8	23
2005–06	Chicoutimi Saguenéens	QMJHL	70	10	42	52	86	9	1	3	4	8
2006–07	Chicoutimi Saguenéens	QMJHL	68	10	43	53	52	4	1	2	3	8
2007–08	Columbia Inferno	ECHL	67	6	11	17	55	13	0	4	4	6
2008–09	Charlotte Checkers	ECHL	70	11	18	29	67	6	0	1	1	2
2009–10	Charlotte Checkers	ECHL	47	13	20	33	23	7	0	5	5	2
2009–10	Providence Bruins	AHL	3	0	1	1	0	—	—	—	—	—
2009–10	Hartford Wolf Pack	AHL	21	1	3	4	4	—	—	—	—	—
2010–11	Greenville Road Warriors	ECHL	25	11	12	23	8	1	0	0	0	0
2010–11	Charlotte Checkers	AHL	1	0	0	0	0	—	—	—	—	—
2010–11	Lake Erie Monsters	AHL	49	2	15	17	20	7	1	1	2	2
2011–12	Hershey Bears	AHL	74	7	14	21	24	3	0	1	1	4
2012–13	Reading Royals	ECHL	1	0	0	0	2	—	—	—	—	—
2012–13	Hershey Bears	AHL	61	2	5	7	35	5	0	3	3	0
2013–14	Hershey Bears	AHL	51	10	10	20	22	—	—	—	—	—
2013–14	Washington Capitals	NHL	10	1	1	2	0	—	—	—	—	—
2014–15	St. John's IceCaps	AHL	49	7	11	18	16	—	—	—	—	—
2014–15	Winnipeg Jets	NHL	1	0	0	0	0	—	—	—	—	—
2015–16	Karlskrona HK	SHL	52	5	12	17	32	—	—	—	—	—
2016–17	Saint-Georges Cool FM 103.5	LNAH	8	3	4	7	4	—	—	—	—	—
2016–17	St. John's IceCaps	AHL	57	3	10	13	14	4	0	0	0	0
2017–18	EC Red Bull Salzburg	EBEL	52	12	22	34	16	19	3	2	5	4
NHL totals			11	1	1	2	0	—	—	—	—	—
