= John de Bankwell =

English judge

Judge
- In office 1297–1308

John de Bankwell, also spelled Bakwell, Bacqwell, or Banquelle, (died 1308) was an English judge.

Bankwell was appointed in 1297 to travel the forests in Essex, Huntingdonshire, Northamptonshire, Rutland, Surrey, and Sussex, for the purpose of enforcing the observance of the forest laws of Henry III of England. In 1299 he was made a justice itinerant for Kent, and a baron of the exchequer in 1307. He was summoned to attend the coronation of Edward II of England, and parliament in 1308. In this year he died, and his widow, Cicely, was relieved from the payment of taxation by favour of the king.

He had landed property at Lee and elsewhere in Kent, which descended, according to the Kentish custom of gavelkind, to his two sons Thomas and William.
