= Nate Schmidt =

American ice hockey player (born 1991)

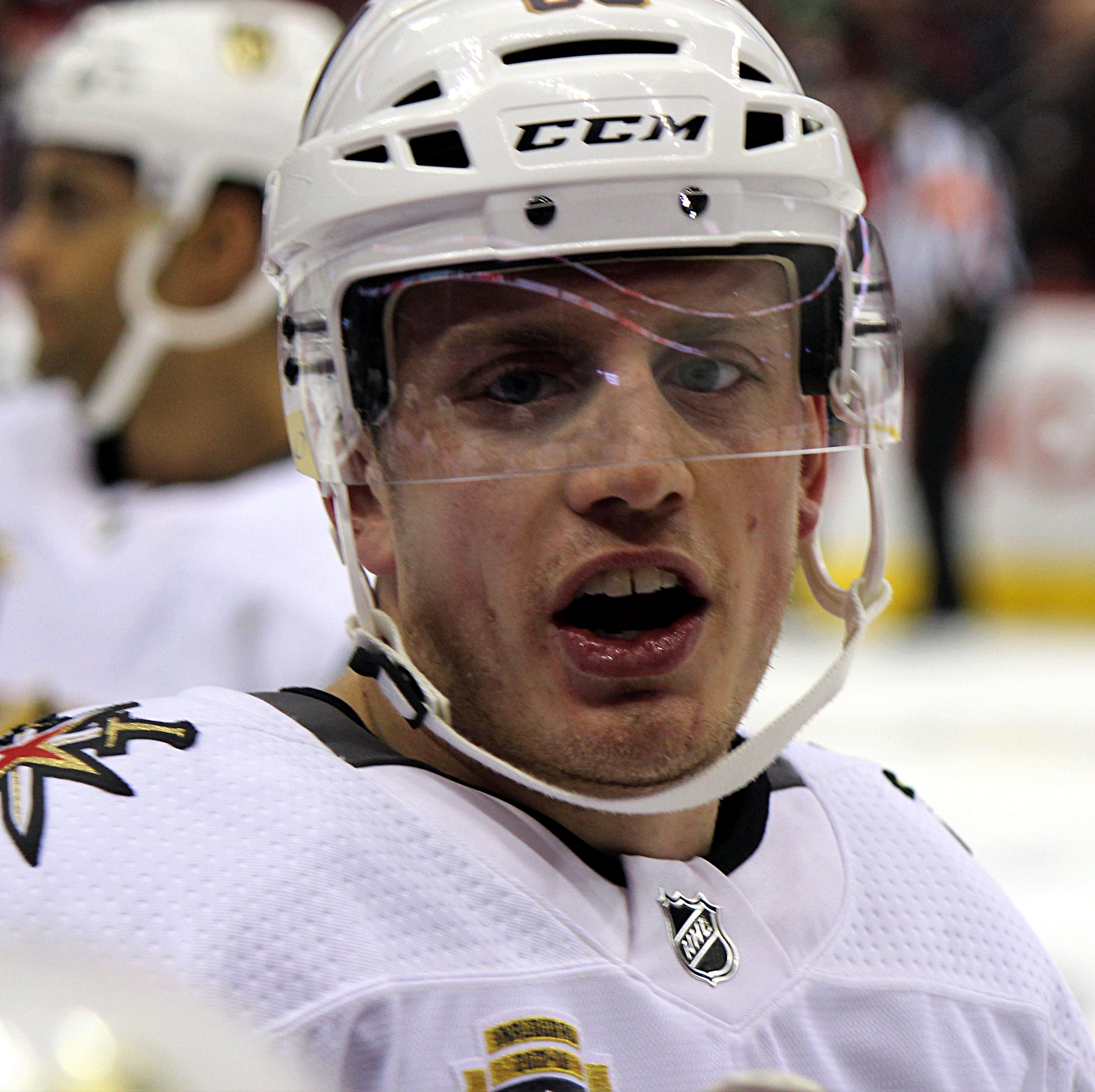
- Schmidt with the Vegas Golden Knights in February 2018
- Born: July 16, 1991 (age 35) St. Cloud, Minnesota, U.S.
- Height: 6 ft 0 in (183 cm)
- Weight: 194 lb (88 kg; 13 st 12 lb)
- Position: Defense
- Shoots: Left
- NHL team Former teams: Utah Mammoth; Washington Capitals; Vegas Golden Knights; Vancouver Canucks; Winnipeg Jets; Florida Panthers
- National team: United States
- NHL draft: Undrafted
- Playing career: 2013–present

Nathan Thomas Schmidt (born July 16, 1991) is an American professional ice hockey player who is a defenseman for the Utah Mammoth of the National Hockey League (NHL). He previously played for the Washington Capitals, Vegas Golden Knights, Vancouver Canucks, Winnipeg Jets and Florida Panthers.

As an undrafted player, Schmidt signed with the Capitals in 2013 after playing for the University of Minnesota. He was claimed by the expansion Golden Knights in 2017, and was part of the upstart inaugural season of the Golden Knights that saw them qualify for the Stanley Cup Final against his former team, the Capitals. After stints with the Vancouver Canucks and Winnipeg Jets, Schmidt signed with the Florida Panthers as a free agent in 2024, with whom he won the Stanley Cup in 2025.

== Playing career ==
=== Amateur ===
While a member of St. Cloud Cathedral of the Minnesota State High School League (MSHSL), Schmidt was selected first overall by the Fargo Force in the 2007 United States Hockey League Futures Draft. His lone year with the Force came during the 2009–10 season, where he recorded 14 goals and 37 points in 57 games.

Schmidt played college hockey with the Minnesota Golden Gophers in the NCAA Men's Division I WCHA conference. In his junior year, Schmidt's play was rewarded with a selection to the 2012–13 All-WCHA First Team.

=== Professional ===
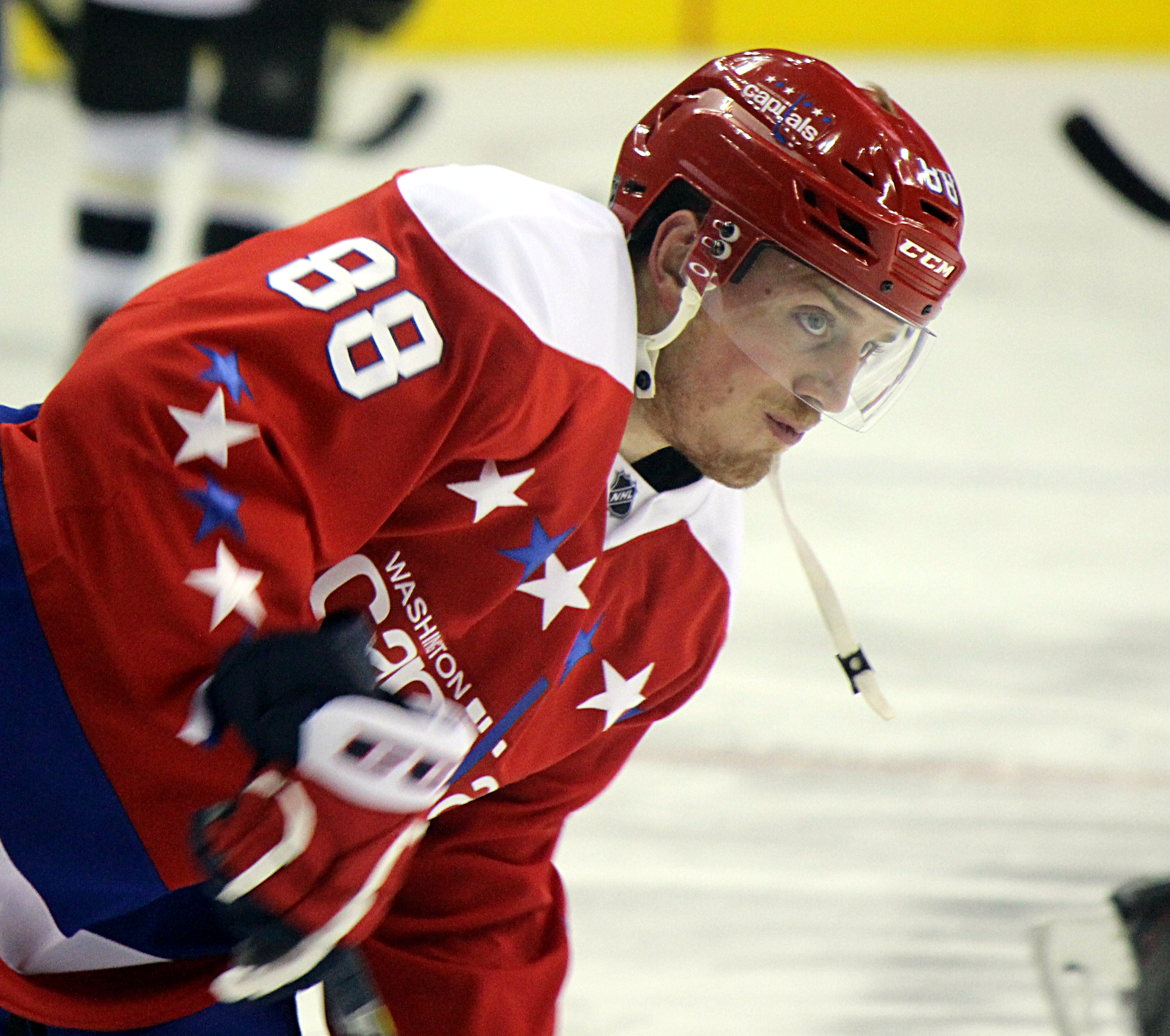
Schmidt with the Washington Capitals in April 2016

==== Washington Capitals (2013-2017) ====
On April 2, 2013, as an undrafted player, Schmidt signed a two-year, entry-level contract with the Washington Capitals. Schmidt played the final eight games of the 2012–13 regular season and five postseason games with the Capitals' American Hockey League (AHL) affiliate, the Hershey Bears.

Schmidt started the 2013–14 season with the Bears but was called up to the Capitals after just one game. He made his NHL debut on October 12, 2013, against the Colorado Avalanche. He scored his first NHL goal on December 7, 2013, against Marek Mazanec of the Nashville Predators. Schmidt was reassigned to Hershey on December 15, 2013.

==== Vegas Golden Knights (2017-2018) ====
After four seasons with the Capitals, Schmidt was left exposed by the club in the 2017 NHL Expansion Draft. He was selected by the Vegas Golden Knights on June 21, 2017. After going to an arbitrator in August, Schmidt signed a two-year, $4.45 million contract with the Golden Knights. During his first season with the team, Schmidt found success, putting up career high numbers in points and leading the Golden Knights in average playing time. He helped lead the Golden Knights to the 2018 Stanley Cup playoffs in their inaugural season, only to lose in the Stanley Cup Final to his former team.

Prior to the 2018–19 season, Schmidt was suspended 20 games for violating the NHL's performance-enhancing drug use policy. He appealed his suspension, but the arbitrator upheld it. On October 25, while serving his suspension, the Golden Knights signed Schmidt to a six-year, $35.8 million extension.

==== Vancouver Canucks (2020-2021) ====
On October 12, 2020, Schmidt was traded by the Vegas Golden Knights to the Vancouver Canucks for a third-round pick in the 2022 NHL entry draft. He stated his unhappiness following the trade, citing a lack of communication with Vegas management and calling it "a tough pill to swallow".

==== Winnipeg Jets (2021-2024) ====
On July 27, 2021, Schmidt was traded to the Winnipeg Jets in exchange for a third-round pick in 2022. Upon joining the Jets, Schmidt praised the Jets defense for being "physical" and their ability to skate and "get up in the play." Schmidt and his defensive partner Neal Pionk began the season strong by tallying six assists in their first six games. This offensive output continued into early November with Schmidt leading the Jets in scoring at home with eight assists and sharing the team leading plus-minus at home with plus-seven. Upon scoring his first goal of the season on November 11, 2021, Schmidt matched his points total from the entire 2020–21 campaign with 10 points. Despite Schmidt's production, the Jets defense struggled to gain points, and their power play was held a 1-for-22 record by late November. As such, Schmidt was moved to their second power play unit alongside Josh Morrissey. Schmidt ended the month of December by missing one game and two practices due to a non-COVID related illness. Following the winter holidays, Schmidt was paired with Logan Stanley instead of his usual partner Josh Morrissey. As the Jets were eliminated from the 2022 Stanley Cup playoffs, Schmidt was named to Team USA for the 2022 IIHF World Championship.

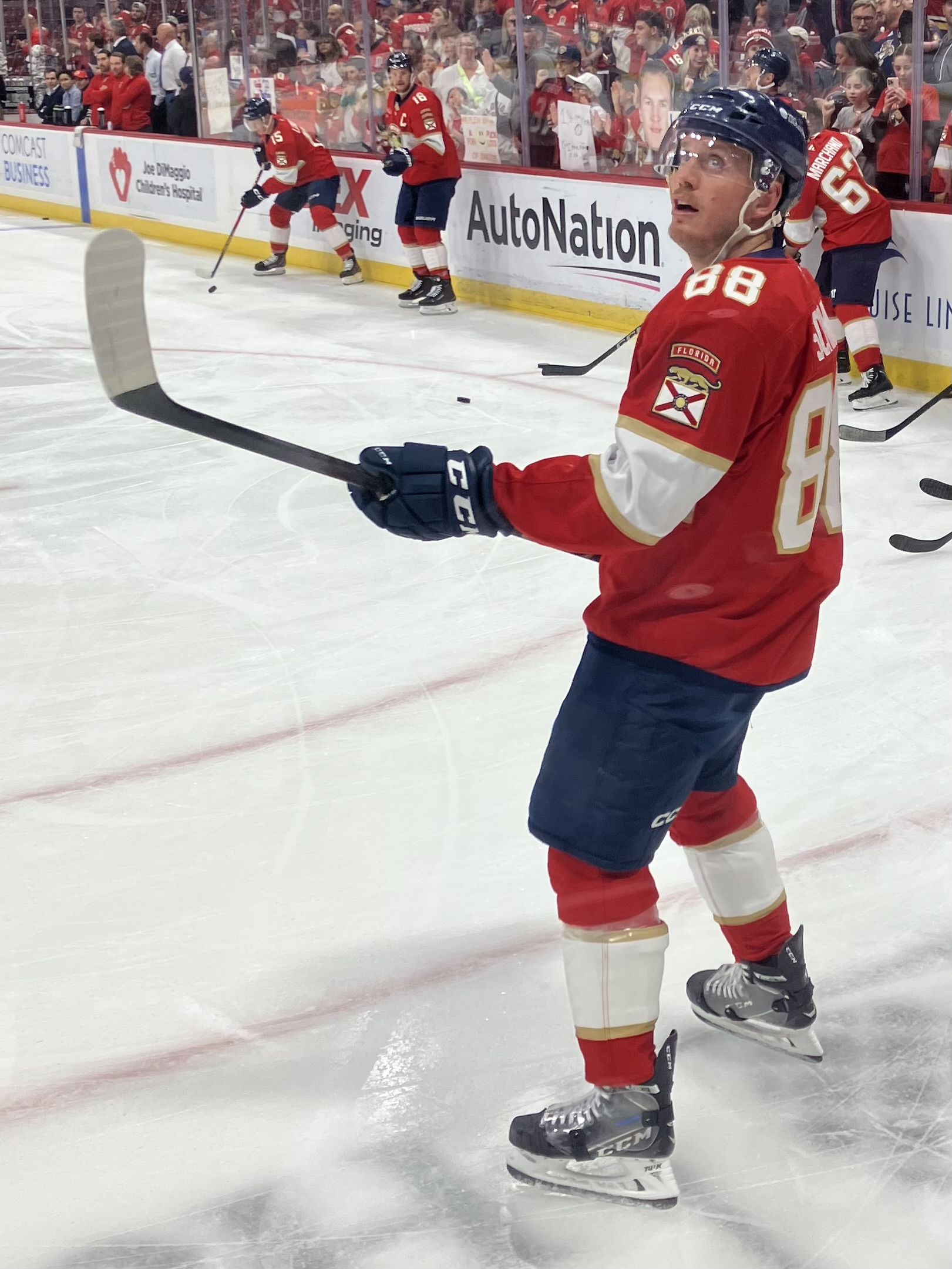
Schmidt with the Panthers in 2025.

On December 16, 2022, Schmidt was placed on long term injured reserve by the Jets after taking a hit from Nashville Predators forward Tanner Jeannot during a game. Following this, it was announced that he was expected to miss four-to-six weeks in order to recover.

On June 30, 2024, the Jets placed Schmidt on unconditional waivers with the purpose of buying out the final year of his contract. He cleared, becoming an unrestricted free agent.

==== Florida Panthers (2024-2025) ====
On July 3, 2024, Schmidt signed a one-year, $800,000 contract with the Florida Panthers. Schmidt won his first Stanley Cup championship as the Florida Panthers defeated the Edmonton Oilers in the Stanley Cup Final in six games.

==== Utah Mammoth (2025-present) ====
On July 2, 2025, Schmidt was signed to a 3-year contract worth $3.5 million annually with the Utah Mammoth.

== Personal life ==
Schmidt was born to Tom and Joann Schmidt, and grew up in St. Cloud, Minnesota, with two siblings. Growing up, Schmidt also played football and baseball, before deciding to stick with hockey. He is also an accomplished worm farmer.

== Career statistics ==
=== Regular season and playoffs ===
			Regular season					Playoffs
Season	Team	League	GP	G	A	Pts	PIM	GP	G	A	Pts	PIM
2006–07	St. Cloud Cathedral	MNHS	16	17	14	31		—	—	—	—	—
2007–08	St. Cloud Cathedral	MNHS	16	10	12	22		—	—	—	—	—
2008–09	St. Cloud Cathedral	MNHS	25	21	24	45	30	3	3	1	4	6
2009–10	Fargo Force	USHL	57	14	23	37	81	13	0	6	6	2
2010–11	University of Minnesota	WCHA	13	0	1	1	6	—	—	—	—	—
2011–12	University of Minnesota	WCHA	43	3	38	41	14	—	—	—	—	—
2012–13	University of Minnesota	WCHA	40	9	23	32	16	—	—	—	—	—
2012–13	Hershey Bears	AHL	8	1	2	3	4	5	0	2	2	0
2013–14	Hershey Bears	AHL	38	2	11	13	12	—	—	—	—	—
2013–14	Washington Capitals	NHL	29	2	4	6	6	—	—	—	—	—
2014–15	Washington Capitals	NHL	39	1	3	4	10	—	—	—	—	—
2014–15	Hershey Bears	AHL	19	3	6	9	6	8	4	5	9	0
2015–16	Washington Capitals	NHL	72	2	14	16	16	10	0	1	1	2
2016–17	Washington Capitals	NHL	60	3	14	17	16	11	1	3	4	4
2017–18	Vegas Golden Knights	NHL	76	5	31	36	16	20	3	4	7	4
2018–19	Vegas Golden Knights	NHL	61	9	21	30	8	7	0	4	4	2
2019–20	Vegas Golden Knights	NHL	59	7	24	31	12	20	2	7	9	4
2020–21	Vancouver Canucks	NHL	54	5	10	15	4	—	—	—	—	—
2021–22	Winnipeg Jets	NHL	77	4	28	32	10	—	—	—	—	—
2022–23	Winnipeg Jets	NHL	71	7	12	19	8	5	0	2	2	0
2023–24	Winnipeg Jets	NHL	63	2	12	14	16	3	1	0	1	0
2024–25	Florida Panthers	NHL	80	5	14	19	30	23	3	9	12	4
2025–26	Utah Mammoth	NHL	82	5	17	22	22	6	0	1	1	2
NHL totals			823	57	204	261	174	105	10	31	41	22

=== International ===
Year	Team	Event	Result	GP	G	A	Pts	PIM
2022	United States	WC	4th	10	2	4	6	4
Senior totals				10	2	4	6	4

== Awards and honors ==
Award	Year	Ref
College
All-WCHA Second Team	2011–12	
All-WCHA First Team	2012–13	
AHCA West Second-Team All-American	2012–13	
NHL
Stanley Cup champion	2025	
