= Cameron Schilling =

American ice hockey player (born 1988)

Cam Schilling
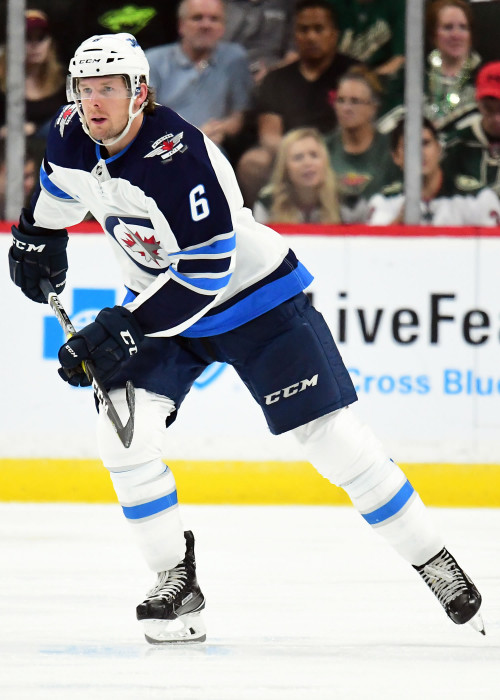
- Schilling with the Winnipeg Jets in 2018
- Born: October 7, 1988 (age 37) Carmel, Indiana, U.S.
- Height: 6 ft 2 in (188 cm)
- Weight: 196 lb (89 kg; 14 st 0 lb)
- Position: Defense
- Shot: Left
- Allsv team Former teams: Djurgårdens IF; Washington Capitals; Winnipeg Jets
- NHL draft: Undrafted
- Playing career: 2012–2024

Ernest Cameron Schilling (born October 7, 1988), is an American professional ice hockey defenseman currently playing with Djurgårdens IF in the HockeyAllsvenskan (Allsv).

== Playing career ==
Undrafted, Schilling played with his home state team, the Indiana Ice, of the United States Hockey League before committing to Miami University of the Central Collegiate Hockey Association.

Upon completion of his four-year collegiate career, he was signed as a free agent to a two-year entry-level contract with the Washington Capitals on March 27, 2012. He was then assigned to make his professional debut on an amateur try-out contract with the Capitals AHL affiliate, the Hershey Bears, to end the 2011–12 season.

In the first full professional season, Schilling was assigned directly to the Hershey Bears to start the 2012–13 season, due to the NHL lockout. After 54 games with the Bears recording 8 points as a defensive defenseman, Schilling received his first NHL recall by the Capitals on March 12, 2013. With the Capitals suffering a rash of injuries on the blueline he made his NHL debut the same day, in a 4–0 loss to the Carolina Hurricanes.

Schilling signed a two-year contract with the Chicago Blackhawks on July 2, 2015, after hitting the free agency market. He was assigned to AHL affiliate, the Rockford IceHogs for the duration of the 2015–16 season, contributing with 5 goals and 22 points in a professional high 73 contests.

In the midst of the 2016–17 season, having continued with the IceHogs and unable to earn a recall to the Blackhawks, Schilling was traded to the Los Angeles Kings in exchange for Michael Latta on January 21, 2017.

On July 1, 2017, Schilling signed a one-year, two-way deal as a free agent with the Winnipeg Jets. On November 28, 2018, with injuries to the Jets defence, and a Moose player that would've been called up instead, Schilling got a call up to the Winnipeg Jets. On November 29, 2018, his first NHL game in 1359 days, Schilling got his first NHL point, after breaking up a play in the defensive zone against the Chicago Blackhawks, leading to a Jets goal.

After three seasons within the Jets organization, Schilling left as a free agent and returned to his original club, the Washington Capitals, agreeing to a one-year, two-way contract on October 10, 2020.

As a free agent from the Capitals having concluded his second stint with the club, Schilling remained un-signed over the summer. With the commencement of the 2021–22 season, Schilling was signed to a one-year AHL contract to join the Abbotsford Canucks, affiliate to the Vancouver Canucks, for their inaugural campaign on October 14, 2021. He made 19 appearances with Abbotsford, collecting 13 points before he was released from his contract on January 7, 2022. Released in order to pursue his first European contract, Schilling signed for the remainder of the season with relegation threatened Swedish club, Djurgårdens IF of the SHL.

== Career statistics ==
			Regular season					Playoffs
Season	Team	League	GP	G	A	Pts	PIM	GP	G	A	Pts	PIM
2007–08	Indiana Ice	USHL	55	2	8	10	91	4	0	0	0	2
2008–09	Miami RedHawks	CCHA	25	0	7	7	43	—	—	—	—	—
2009–10	Miami RedHawks	CCHA	42	4	15	19	58	—	—	—	—	—
2010–11	Miami RedHawks	CCHA	38	3	14	17	34	—	—	—	—	—
2011–12	Miami RedHawks	CCHA	39	1	13	14	20	—	—	—	—	—
2011–12	Hershey Bears	AHL	7	0	0	0	14	4	2	0	2	4
2012–13	Hershey Bears	AHL	70	7	9	16	61	5	0	1	1	4
2012–13	Washington Capitals	NHL	1	0	0	0	0	—	—	—	—	—
2013–14	Hershey Bears	AHL	70	3	13	16	89	—	—	—	—	—
2013–14	Washington Capitals	NHL	1	0	0	0	0	—	—	—	—	—
2014–15	Hershey Bears	AHL	63	3	15	18	63	10	3	5	8	2
2014–15	Washington Capitals	NHL	4	0	0	0	4	—	—	—	—	—
2015–16	Rockford IceHogs	AHL	73	5	17	22	38	3	0	1	1	0
2016–17	Rockford IceHogs	AHL	40	7	10	17	18	—	—	—	—	—
2016–17	Ontario Reign	AHL	32	1	8	9	31	5	0	2	2	0
2017–18	Manitoba Moose	AHL	71	6	26	32	27	9	2	2	4	4
2018–19	Manitoba Moose	AHL	64	6	23	29	30	—	—	—	—	—
2018–19	Winnipeg Jets	NHL	4	0	1	1	0	—	—	—	—	—
2019–20	Manitoba Moose	AHL	54	5	19	24	24	—	—	—	—	—
2020–21	Hershey Bears	AHL	31	4	15	19	28	—	—	—	—	—
2021–22	Abbotsford Canucks	AHL	19	1	12	13	16	—	—	—	—	—
2021–22	Djurgårdens IF	SHL	22	1	8	9	10	—	—	—	—	—
NHL totals			10	0	1	1	4	—	—	—	—	—
