= Michael Latta =

Canadian ice hockey player (born 1991)

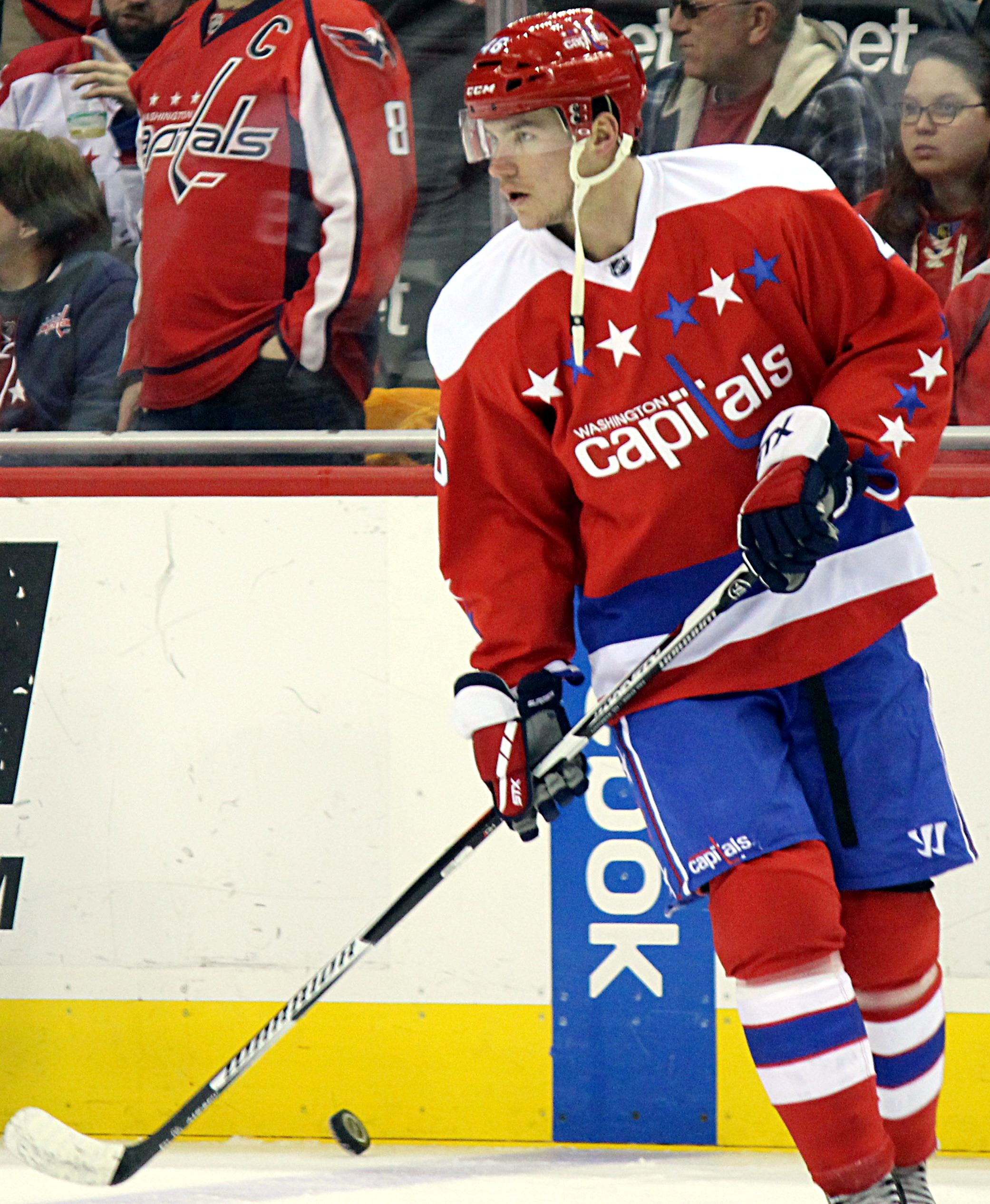
- Latta with Washington Capitals in March 2016
- Born: May 25, 1991 (age 35) St. Clements, Ontario, Canada
- Height: 6 ft 0 in (183 cm)
- Weight: 201 lb (91 kg; 14 st 5 lb)
- Position: Centre
- Shoots: Right
- team Former teams: Free agent Washington Capitals; Kunlun Red Star; Färjestad BK
- NHL draft: 72nd overall, 2009; Nashville Predators
- Playing career: 2010–present

Michael Latta (born May 25, 1991) is a Canadian professional ice hockey centre who is currently an unrestricted free agent. He most recently played for Färjestad BK of the Swedish Hockey League (SHL). Latta was selected by the Nashville Predators in the third round, 72nd overall, at the 2009 NHL Entry Draft.

== Playing career ==
=== Junior ===
Prior to turning professional, Latta played major junior hockey in the Ontario Hockey League (OHL) with the Ottawa 67's and Guelph Storm. He was drafted by the Nashville Predators on June 26, 2009, at the 2009 NHL Entry Draft, 72nd overall.

=== Professional ===
After playing one more season in the OHL after being drafted, on April 14, 2010, Nashville signed Latta to a three-year, entry-level contract. He played three seasons with the Predators' American Hockey League (AHL) affiliate, the Milwaukee Admirals.

During the 2012–13 season, on April 3, 2013, at the NHL trade deadline, Latta was traded to the Washington Capitals, along with Martin Erat, in exchange for prospect Filip Forsberg.

Latta made his NHL debut with the Capitals in the 2013–14 season. He scored his first career NHL goal on November 15, 2013, against the Detroit Red Wings.

On July 1, 2016, after not being retained by the Capitals, Latta signed a one-year deal as a free agent with the Los Angeles Kings. After competing in training camp and pre-season with the Kings, Latta was reassigned to begin the 2016–17 season with AHL affiliate, the Ontario Reign. Latta featured in 29 games with the Reign for 6 points before he was traded without making an appearance for the Kings to the Chicago Blackhawks, in exchange for Cameron Schilling on January 21, 2017. Latta played out the season with the Blackhawks AHL affiliate, the Rockford IceHogs, regaining his scoring touch in contributing with 16 points in 32 games.

As a restricted free agent, Latta was not extended a qualifying offer by the Blackhawks releasing him to free agency on June 26, 2017. On July 4, 2017, Latta signed a one-year, two-way contract with the Arizona Coyotes. On December 14, the Coyotes traded Latta to the New Jersey Devils in exchange for Ryan Kujawinski.

On July 18, 2018, having left the Devils as a free agent, Latta signed a one-year contract with Chinese club, Kunlun Red Star of the Kontinental Hockey League (KHL).

Having left the KHL at the conclusion of his contract, Latta remained a free agent to start the 2019–20 season. On November 14, 2019, Latta agreed to join Swedish outfit, Färjestad BK of the SHL, on a one-year contract.

== Personal life ==
Latta is the cousin of New York Islanders defenceman Logan Stanley.

== Career statistics ==
			Regular season					Playoffs
Season	Team	League	GP	G	A	Pts	PIM	GP	G	A	Pts	PIM
2007–08	Ottawa 67's	OHL	50	14	14	28	78	4	0	1	1	2
2008–09	Ottawa 67's	OHL	23	8	13	21	32	—	—	—	—	—
2008–09	Guelph Storm	OHL	42	14	22	36	60	4	0	2	2	12
2009–10	Guelph Storm	OHL	58	33	40	73	157	5	2	7	9	14
2009–10	Milwaukee Admirals	AHL	—	—	—	—	—	1	0	0	0	0
2010–11	Guelph Storm	OHL	68	34	55	89	158	6	5	5	10	11
2010–11	Milwaukee Admirals	AHL	4	0	1	1	2	7	0	0	0	12
2011–12	Milwaukee Admirals	AHL	51	14	13	27	100	3	0	1	1	2
2012–13	Milwaukee Admirals	AHL	67	9	26	35	184	—	—	—	—	—
2012–13	Hershey Bears	AHL	9	1	2	3	14	5	2	1	3	6
2013–14	Washington Capitals	NHL	17	1	3	4	12	—	—	—	—	—
2013–14	Hershey Bears	AHL	52	14	20	34	134	—	—	—	—	—
2014–15	Washington Capitals	NHL	53	0	6	6	68	4	0	0	0	2
2015–16	Washington Capitals	NHL	43	3	4	7	50	—	—	—	—	—
2016–17	Ontario Reign	AHL	29	2	4	6	67	—	—	—	—	—
2016–17	Rockford IceHogs	AHL	32	3	13	16	61	—	—	—	—	—
2017–18	Tucson Roadrunners	AHL	20	2	6	8	17	—	—	—	—	—
2017–18	Binghamton Devils	AHL	40	5	14	19	47	—	—	—	—	—
2018–19	Kunlun Red Star	KHL	51	5	9	14	71	—	—	—	—	—
2019–20	Färjestad BK	SHL	26	3	2	5	43	—	—	—	—	—
NHL totals			113	4	13	17	130	4	0	0	0	2
