= Patrick Wellar =

Canadian ice hockey player

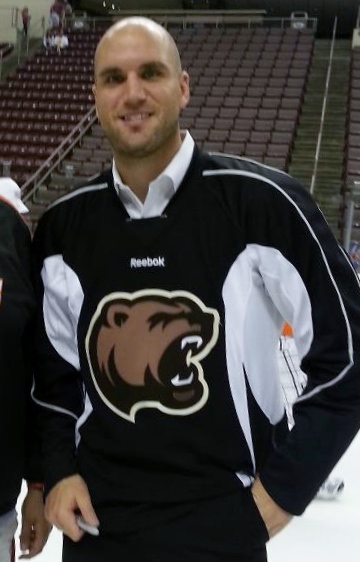
- Wellar with the Hershey Bears in 2012
- Born: December 4, 1983 (age 42) Carrot River, Saskatchewan, Canada
- Height: 6 ft 3 in (191 cm)
- Weight: 210 lb (95 kg; 15 st 0 lb)
- Position: Forward
- Shot: Left
- Played for: Worcester IceCats; Peoria Rivermen; Toronto Marlies; Hershey Bears
- NHL draft: 77th overall, 2002; Washington Capitals
- Playing career: 2004–2016

Patrick Wellar (born December 4, 1983) is a Canadian former professional ice hockey player, who is currently the assistant coach for the Hershey Bears in the American Hockey League. He was selected by the Washington Capitals in the 3rd round (77th overall) of the 2002 NHL entry draft.

At the conclusion of the 2012–13 season on May 10, 2013, Wellar was re-signed by the Hershey Bears on a one-year contract, marking his sixth year with the club. Following the 2013–14 season, Wellar did not return to the Bears. On September 8, 2014, the Utah Grizzlies announced that Wellar would be joining the team as a player and an assistant coach. In the 2014–15 season, Wellar appeared in 60 games from the blueline contributing with 12 points.

On August 20, 2015, Wellar was announced to have signed a one-year deal in a return to the Alaska Aces, with whom he helped win the Kelly Cup in 2006. At the conclusion of the season with the Aces, Wellar opted to retire from professional hockey after 12 years. He was hired as an assistant coach to the Cincinnati Cyclones of the ECHL on August 4, 2016.

== Career statistics ==
			Regular season					Playoffs
Season	Team	League	GP	G	A	Pts	PIM	GP	G	A	Pts	PIM
1999–2000	Saskatoon Blazers AAA	SMHL	44	5	15	20	112	3	0	1	1	8
1999–2000	Estevan Bruins	SJHL	—	—	—	—	—	1	0	0	0	0
1999–2000	Portland Winterhawks	WHL	1	0	0	0	0	—	—	—	—	—
2000–01	Portland Winterhawks	WHL	57	2	7	9	65	10	0	1	1	13
2001–02	Portland Winterhawks	WHL	61	3	10	13	125	7	0	2	2	4
2002–03	Portland Winterhawks	WHL	11	1	4	5	31	—	—	—	—	—
2002–03	Calgary Hitmen	WHL	49	3	11	14	88	5	0	0	0	15
2003–04	Calgary Hitmen	WHL	68	7	10	17	132	7	1	1	2	10
2004–05	Peoria Rivermen	ECHL	62	2	10	12	91	—	—	—	—	—
2004–05	Worcester IceCats	AHL	2	0	1	1	0	—	—	—	—	—
2005–06	Alaska Aces	ECHL	53	6	13	19	89	22	2	2	4	30
2005–06	Peoria Rivermen	AHL	5	0	0	0	2	—	—	—	—	—
2006–07	Peoria Rivermen	AHL	21	0	1	1	9	—	—	—	—	—
2006–07	Alaska Aces	ECHL	53	7	7	14	101	15	1	3	4	20
2007–08	Columbia Inferno	ECHL	52	8	20	28	77	13	0	4	4	40
2007–08	Toronto Marlies	AHL	18	1	2	3	13	7	1	0	1	16
2008–09	Reading Royals	ECHL	25	1	7	8	47	—	—	—	—	—
2008–09	Hershey Bears	AHL	21	1	2	3	37	—	—	—	—	—
2008–09	South Carolina Stingrays	ECHL	14	1	5	6	10	23	1	5	6	28
2009–10	Hershey Bears	AHL	47	1	11	12	136	21	0	6	6	22
2009–10	South Carolina Stingrays	ECHL	13	0	0	0	16	—	—	—	—	—
2010–11	Hershey Bears	AHL	72	3	15	18	120	6	0	1	1	8
2011–12	Hershey Bears	AHL	55	1	6	7	107	4	0	0	0	4
2012–13	Hershey Bears	AHL	19	0	1	1	52	5	0	0	0	22
2012–13	Reading Royals	ECHL	37	2	13	15	45	7	0	3	3	10
2013–14	Hershey Bears	AHL	46	1	4	5	93	—	—	—	—	—
2014–15	Utah Grizzlies	ECHL	60	2	10	12	72	11	2	1	3	30
2015–16	Alaska Aces	ECHL	72	2	12	14	106	—	—	—	—	—
ECHL totals			441	31	97	128	654	91	6	18	24	158
AHL totals			306	8	43	51	569	43	1	7	8	92
