= Boyd Kane =

Canadian ice hockey player

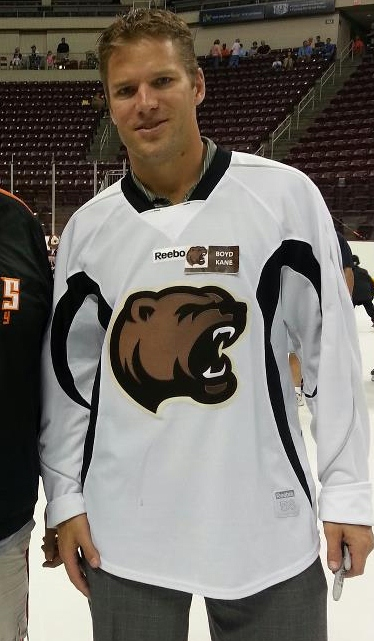
- Born: April 18, 1978 (age 48) Swift Current, Saskatchewan, Canada
- Height: 6 ft 2 in (188 cm)
- Weight: 225 lb (102 kg; 16 st 1 lb)
- Position: Left wing
- Shot: Left
- Played for: Philadelphia Flyers; Washington Capitals; KHL Medveščak Zagreb
- NHL draft: 72nd overall, 1996; Pittsburgh Penguins; 114th overall, 1998; New York Rangers
- Playing career: 1998–2014

Boyd Kane (born April 18, 1978) is a Canadian former professional ice hockey left winger who played in the National Hockey League (NHL). He most notably played over 1000 games in the American Hockey League (AHL), claiming three Calder Cups.

== Playing career ==
Initially drafted 72nd overall in the 1996 NHL entry draft by the Pittsburgh Penguins, Pittsburgh failed to come to terms with Kane on a contract. He re-entered the draft in 1998 and was selected by the New York Rangers 114th overall. He split his first three professional seasons between the Hartford Wolf Pack of the American Hockey League and the Charlotte Checkers of the ECHL before finally earning a full-time spot with Hartford in 2001–02. Prior to the 2002–03 season, however, he was traded to the Tampa Bay Lightning for Gordie Dwyer, spending the season with the Springfield Falcons.

Kane signed with the Philadelphia Flyers in the off-season and while he played the majority of the 2003–04 season with the Philadelphia Phantoms, he played in his first seven NHL games with the Flyers. During the NHL Lockout he captained the Phantoms to a Calder Cup Championship.

After signing with the Washington Capitals in the off-season, he was sent down to the Hershey Bears where he was part of another run to a Calder Cup Championship.

He returned to Philadelphia in the off-season and made the Flyers final roster out of training camp prior to the 2006–07 NHL season. He was later sent down to the Phantoms.

On July 12, 2009, Kane signed to return with the Washington Capitals, primarily to reunited with the Hershey Bears of the AHL.

On July 3, 2013, Kane signed a one-year contract with Croatian club, KHL Medveščak Zagreb of the Kontinental Hockey League, re-uniting with former Hershey Bears head coach Mark French. In his 16th and final professional season in 2013–14, Kane provided a veteran presence, contributing 4 goals and 9 points 48 games.

== Career statistics ==
			Regular season					Playoffs
Season	Team	League	GP	G	A	Pts	PIM	GP	G	A	Pts	PIM
1994–95	Regina Pats	WHL	25	6	5	11	6	4	0	0	0	0
1995–96	Regina Pats	WHL	72	21	42	63	155	11	5	7	12	12
1996–97	Regina Pats	WHL	66	25	50	75	154	5	1	1	2	15
1997–98	Regina Pats	WHL	68	48	45	93	133	9	5	7	12	29
1998–99	Hartford Wolf Pack	AHL	56	3	5	8	23	—	—	—	—	—
1998–99	Charlotte Checkers	ECHL	12	5	6	11	14	—	—	—	—	—
1999–00	Charlotte Checkers	ECHL	47	10	19	29	110	—	—	—	—	—
1999–00	B.C. Icemen	UHL	3	0	2	2	4	1	0	0	0	0
1999–00	Hartford Wolf Pack	AHL	8	0	0	0	0	—	—	—	—	—
2000–01	Charlotte Checkers	ECHL	12	9	8	17	6	—	—	—	—	—
2000–01	Hartford Wolf Pack	AHL	56	11	17	28	81	5	2	0	2	2
2001–02	Hartford Wolf Pack	AHL	78	17	22	39	193	10	1	2	3	50
2002–03	Springfield Falcons	AHL	72	15	22	37	121	6	3	1	4	39
2003–04	Philadelphia Phantoms	AHL	73	13	22	35	177	12	0	1	1	39
2003–04	Philadelphia Flyers	NHL	7	0	0	0	7	—	—	—	—	—
2004–05	Philadelphia Phantoms	AHL	58	9	15	24	112	21	0	7	7	28
2005–06	Hershey Bears	AHL	74	20	29	49	185	21	4	9	13	14
2005–06	Washington Capitals	NHL	5	0	1	1	2	—	—	—	—	—
2006–07	Philadelphia Flyers	NHL	15	0	2	2	28	—	—	—	—	—
2006–07	Philadelphia Phantoms	AHL	57	10	22	32	98	—	—	—	—	—
2007–08	Philadelphia Phantoms	AHL	57	18	26	44	102	12	4	4	8	25
2008–09	Philadelphia Phantoms	AHL	58	17	26	43	74	4	1	1	2	6
2008–09	Philadelphia Flyers	NHL	1	0	0	0	0	—	—	—	—	—
2009–10	Washington Capitals	NHL	3	0	0	0	0	—	—	—	—	—
2009–10	Hershey Bears	AHL	76	24	20	44	77	21	1	6	7	34
2010–11	Hershey Bears	AHL	74	24	25	49	80	6	1	2	3	4
2011–12	Hershey Bears	AHL	67	19	22	41	149	5	2	1	3	6
2012–13	Hershey Bears	AHL	74	15	22	37	66	5	0	0	0	2
2013–14	KHL Medvescak Zagreb	KHL	48	4	5	9	64	4	1	1	2	6
AHL totals			938	215	295	510	1547	128	19	34	53	218
NHL totals			31	0	3	3	39	—	—	—	—	—

== Awards and honours ==
Award	Year
AHL
Calder Cup (Philadelphia Phantoms)	2005
Calder Cup (Hershey Bears)	2006, 2010
All-Star Game	2012
