= Mike Banwell =

Canadian ice hockey player

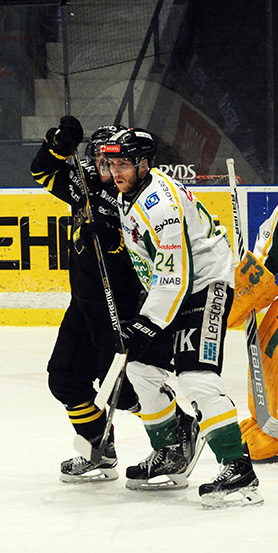
- Born: June 18, 1987 (age 38); Scarborough, Ontario, Canada
- Height: 6 ft 2 in (188 cm)
- Weight: 190 lb (86 kg; 13 st 8 lb)
- Position: Defence
- Shot: Left
- Played for: Albany Devils; Worcester Sharks; Springfield Falcons; Bridgeport Sound Tigers; IF Björklöven; Lillehammer IK
- NHL draft: Undrafted
- Playing career: 2011–2017

Michael Banwell (born June 18, 1987) is a Canadian former professional ice hockey defenceman.

== Playing career ==
Banwell played Division 1 NCAA hockey for the University of Maine Black Bears, where he was a finance major. In his four years there, he played 109 games, totalling 18 points and 169 penalty minutes. In the 08-09 season, Banwell was tied for team leader in plus-minus rating with Gustav Nyquist.

Banwell played two seasons in the American Hockey League. During the 2011–12 season, he played for the Albany Devils. Banwell started the 2012–13 season playing for the Trenton Titans, where he played 10 games before being called up to the Worcester Sharks. He split the season between the Worcester Sharks and the Springfield Falcons. Banwell tallied a total of 7 fights this season (5 AHL, 2 ECHL). The following season, Banwell signed with the Reading Royals of the ECHL. In his third professional season, playing 60 games, he tallied 3 goals and 16 assists for 19 points with the Royals. He was also called up briefly to the Bridgeport Sound Tigers during the 2013–14 season.

Banwell signed his first contract abroad on a one-year deal with IF Björklöven of the Swedish HockeyAllsvenskan on May 9, 2015. In the 2015–16 season, he appeared in 28 games with Björklöven before agreeing to a mid-season transfer to Norwegian club, Lillehammer IK of the GET-ligaen on December 10, 2015.

Unable to help Lillehammer reach the postseason, Banwell left Norway in the off-season, returning to the ECHL in signing a one-year deal with the Utah Grizzlies on August 24, 2016.
