= Doug Yingst =

American ice hockey executive

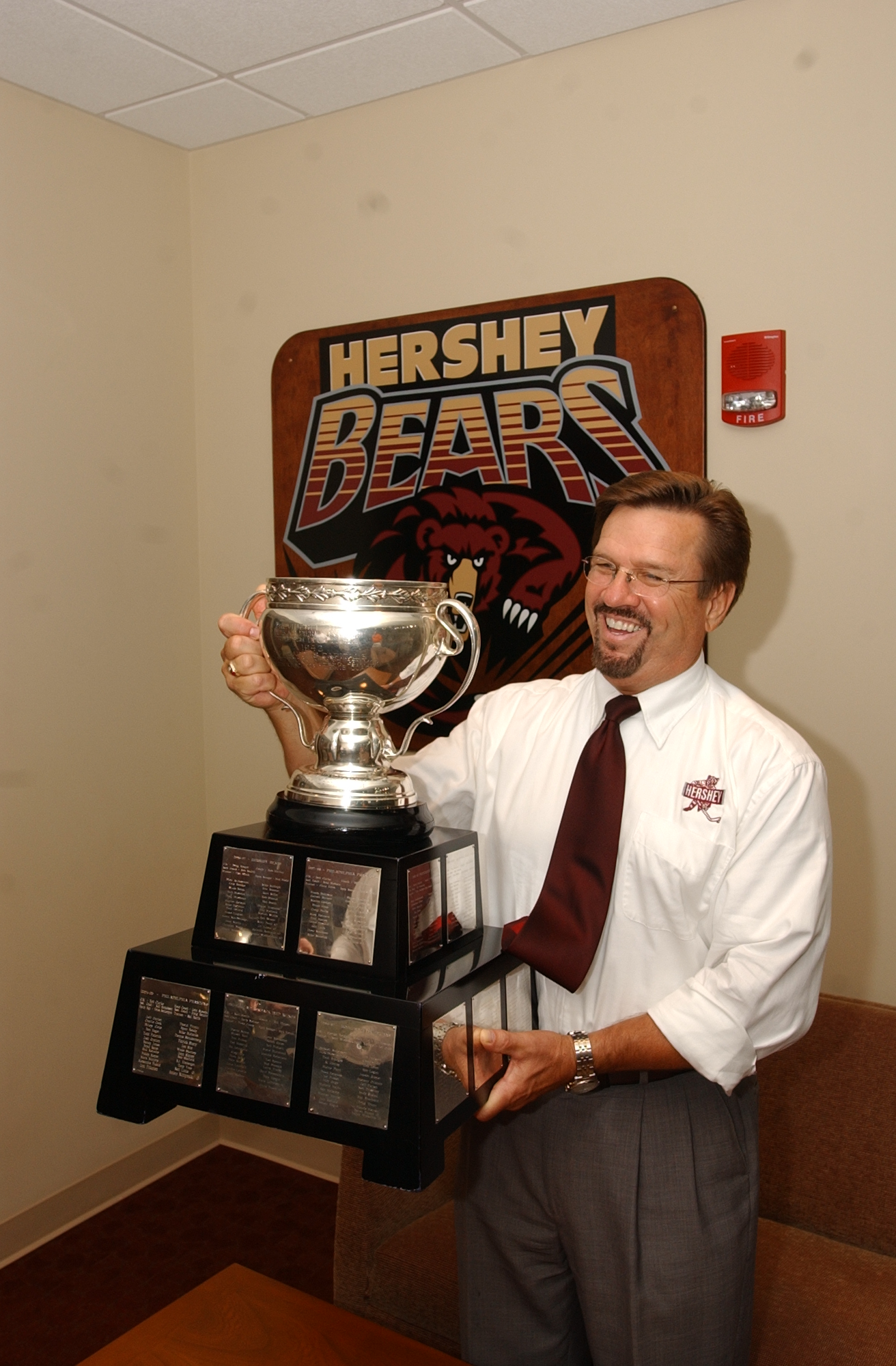
- Yingst holding the Calder Cup after the Hershey Bears' 2006 championship victory

President of the Hershey Bears
- In office 1998–2016

General Manager of the Hershey Bears
- In office 1996–2016

Personal details
- Born: c. 1953 (age 72–73)
Ice hockey career
- Coached for: Hershey Bears

Doug Yingst (born c. 1953) is an American ice hockey executive. He was the president and general manager of the Hershey Bears of the American Hockey League, a dual-position he held from the 1998–99 AHL season to the 2015–16 AHL season.

Yingst is a two-time winner of the James C. Hendy Memorial Award, which is awarded annually to the executive who has made the most outstanding contribution to the American Hockey League.

== Career ==
Doug Yingst began his run in the Hershey Bears' organization as the sales and promotions director in 1982. From 1988 to 1991, he served as assistant general manager under the longtime Bears' coach and general manager Frank Mathers. From 1991 to 1996, he was the assistant general manager and director of hockey operations for the team. He was first named the Hershey Bears' general manager for the 1996–97 season, winning the Calder Cup in his first season. In 1998, he was also given the position of team president, positions he held for another 17 seasons. Under his management, the club won four championships tying an AHL record, jointly held by several other managers, including Frank Mathers.

During his tenure, the Bears recorded the best five-year run in AHL history, winning three titles and advancing to a fourth Final between 2005–06 and 2009–10. The Bears posted an AHL record 60 wins in 2009–10.

For his efforts, Yingst was presented with the Thomas Ebright Memorial Award, given for outstanding service to the AHL, in 2008. Yingst also claimed the James C. Hendy Memorial Award in 2000 and 2006, presented to the outstanding executive of the year in the league. He is only one of four men in league history to win the award twice. In 2010–11, he was named the chairman of the AHL's Executive Committee, and has served previously as chairman of the AHL’s Competition and Marketing Committees. While serving as the Bears' promotions director, he won the Ken McKenzie Award in 1988, given annually by the AHL to the person judged to have done the most to promote his team. In 2017, he was inducted into the AHL Hall of Fame.

His son Matthew is head coach of women's ice hockey at Lebanon Valley College going into the 2023-2024 season, having held this position since the 2016-2017 season.
