= Jamie Johnson (ice hockey) =

Canadian ice hockey player

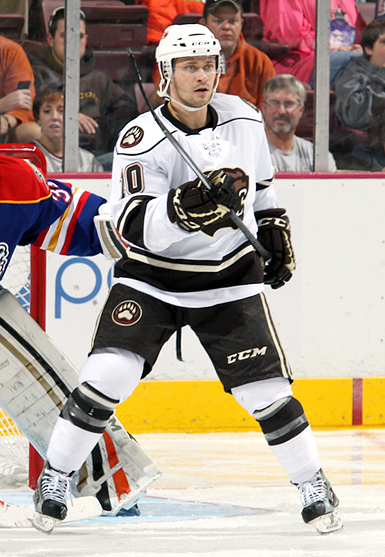
- Johnson with the Hershey Bears in 2013
- Born: January 23, 1982 (age 44) Port Franks, Ontario, Canada
- Height: 5 ft 11 in (180 cm)
- Weight: 185 lb (84 kg; 13 st 3 lb)
- Position: Centre
- Shot: Right
- Played for: Iowa Stars; Bridgeport Sound Tigers; Albany River Rats; TPS; Rochester Americans; Grand Rapids Griffins; Dinamo Riga; Hershey Bears; Kölner Haie; Vienna Capitals; Herning Blue Fox
- NHL draft: Undrafted
- Playing career: 2003–2017

Jamie Johnson (born January 23, 1982) is a Canadian former professional ice hockey player. He last played for Herning Blue Fox of the Danish Metal Ligaen.

== Early life ==
Johnson was born in Port Franks, Ontario. He played junior hockey with the Sarnia Sting and the Oshawa Generals in the Ontario Hockey League. Johnson made his professional debut in the ECHL with the Louisiana IceGators in the 2003–04 season.

== Career ==
On July 6, 2010, Johnson was signed as a free agent by the Detroit Red Wings. On July 18, 2012, after a strong season in the American Hockey League with the Grand Rapids Griffins, Johnson signaled his intent to return to Europe in signing a two-year contract with Dinamo Riga of the Kontinental Hockey League.

Following his retirement in the spring of 2017, Johnson became an assistant coach for the Ontario Tech Ridgebacks or the 2017–18 season. He also the co-owner and director of the skating skills clinic Scary Skate.
