= 2012–13 AHL season =

- League: American Hockey League
- Sport: Ice hockey
- Duration: October 12, 2012 - April 21, 2013

Regular season
- Macgregor Kilpatrick Trophy: Providence Bruins
- Season MVP: Tyler Johnson
- Top scorer: Brandon Pirri

Playoffs
- Playoffs MVP: Tomas Tatar

Calder Cup
- Champions: Grand Rapids Griffins
- Runners-up: Syracuse Crunch

AHL seasons
- 2011–12 2013–14

The 2012–13 AHL season was the 77th season of the American Hockey League. The regular season began on October 12, 2012 and ended on April 21, 2013. The 2013 Calder Cup playoffs followed the conclusion of the regular season. The Calder Cup was won by the Grand Rapids Griffins for their first Calder Cup in franchise history.

== Regular season ==
On June 28, the Board of Governors approved a minor realignment for the league for the 2012–13 season. The only changes were made in the Western Conference, as three teams swapped divisions for this season: Abbotsford moves to the North Division, Grand Rapids moves to the Midwest Division and Charlotte moves to the newly renamed South Division (formerly West Division). The Eastern Conference remains the same as the previous season. Among the rule changes for this season, the league has adopted video-review for goals, which has been in use in the NHL for years.

Because of the 2012–13 NHL lockout, all NHL players who were still eligible to play in the AHL without clearing waivers were assigned to their AHL teams for the duration of the lockout. The lockout also forced the cancellation of one of the two AHL Outdoor Classics for 2012; as a result, there was only one Outdoor Classic in 2013. The Hershey Bears hosted the Wilkes-Barre/Scranton Penguins at Hersheypark Stadium on January 20. The Penguins won the game 2–1 in overtime before a crowd of 17,653 spectators.

== Team and NHL affiliation changes ==
=== Relocations ===
As a result of the aforementioned lockout, the Rochester Americans moved a portion of its home schedule to the First Niagara Center in Buffalo, New York to fill the void of its parent club, the Buffalo Sabres, during the lockout (both teams are owned by Terrence Pegula). The team's name and branding remain unchanged.

=== Affiliation changes ===
| AHL team | New affiliate | Old affiliate |
|---|---|---|
| Norfolk Admirals | Anaheim | Tampa Bay |
| Syracuse Crunch | Tampa Bay | Anaheim |

== Final standings ==
y– indicates team clinched division and a playoff spot
x– indicates team clinched a playoff spot
e– indicates team was eliminated from playoff contention

=== Eastern Conference ===
| Atlantic Division | GP | W | L | OTL | SOL | Pts | GF | GA |
|---|---|---|---|---|---|---|---|---|
| y–Providence Bruins (BOS) | 76 | 50 | 21 | 0 | 5 | 105 | 222 | 183 |
| x–Portland Pirates (PHX) | 76 | 41 | 30 | 3 | 2 | 87 | 230 | 233 |
| x–Manchester Monarchs (LAK) | 76 | 37 | 32 | 3 | 4 | 81 | 219 | 209 |
| e–Worcester Sharks (SJS) | 76 | 31 | 34 | 4 | 7 | 73 | 191 | 228 |
| e–St. John's IceCaps (WPG) | 76 | 32 | 36 | 3 | 5 | 72 | 195 | 237 |

| Northeast Division | GP | W | L | OTL | SOL | Pts | GF | GA |
|---|---|---|---|---|---|---|---|---|
| y–Springfield Falcons (CBJ) | 76 | 45 | 22 | 5 | 4 | 99 | 235 | 186 |
| e–Connecticut Whale (NYR) | 76 | 35 | 32 | 6 | 3 | 79 | 213 | 222 |
| e–Bridgeport Sound Tigers (NYI) | 76 | 32 | 32 | 7 | 5 | 76 | 218 | 242 |
| e–Albany Devils (NJD) | 76 | 31 | 32 | 1 | 12 | 75 | 193 | 225 |
| e–Adirondack Phantoms (PHI) | 76 | 31 | 38 | 3 | 4 | 69 | 187 | 223 |

| East Division | GP | W | L | OTL | SOL | Pts | GF | GA |
|---|---|---|---|---|---|---|---|---|
| y–Syracuse Crunch (TBL) | 76 | 43 | 22 | 6 | 5 | 97 | 247 | 201 |
| x–Binghamton Senators (OTT) | 76 | 44 | 24 | 1 | 7 | 96 | 227 | 188 |
| x–Wilkes-Barre/Scranton Penguins (PIT) | 76 | 42 | 30 | 2 | 2 | 88 | 185 | 178 |
| x–Hershey Bears (WSH) | 76 | 36 | 31 | 3 | 6 | 81 | 204 | 196 |
| e–Norfolk Admirals (ANA) | 76 | 37 | 34 | 4 | 1 | 79 | 188 | 207 |

=== Western Conference ===
| North Division | GP | W | L | OTL | SOL | Pts | GF | GA |
|---|---|---|---|---|---|---|---|---|
| y–Toronto Marlies (TOR) | 76 | 43 | 23 | 3 | 7 | 96 | 237 | 199 |
| x–Rochester Americans (BUF) | 76 | 43 | 29 | 3 | 1 | 90 | 234 | 209 |
| e–Lake Erie Monsters (COL) | 76 | 35 | 31 | 3 | 7 | 80 | 211 | 220 |
| e–Abbotsford Heat (CGY) | 76 | 34 | 32 | 4 | 6 | 78 | 171 | 198 |
| e–Hamilton Bulldogs (MTL) | 76 | 29 | 41 | 1 | 5 | 64 | 159 | 228 |

| Midwest Division | GP | W | L | OTL | SOL | Pts | GF | GA |
|---|---|---|---|---|---|---|---|---|
| y–Grand Rapids Griffins (DET) | 76 | 42 | 26 | 4 | 4 | 92 | 234 | 205 |
| x–Milwaukee Admirals (NSH) | 76 | 41 | 28 | 4 | 3 | 89 | 197 | 200 |
| e–Rockford IceHogs (CHI) | 76 | 42 | 31 | 2 | 1 | 87 | 246 | 225 |
| e–Chicago Wolves (VAN) | 76 | 37 | 30 | 5 | 4 | 83 | 204 | 207 |
| e–Peoria Rivermen (STL) | 76 | 33 | 35 | 5 | 3 | 74 | 183 | 218 |

| South Division | GP | W | L | OTL | SOL | Pts | GF | GA |
|---|---|---|---|---|---|---|---|---|
| y–Texas Stars (DAL) | 76 | 43 | 22 | 5 | 6 | 97 | 235 | 201 |
| x–Charlotte Checkers (CAR) | 76 | 42 | 26 | 4 | 4 | 92 | 226 | 202 |
| x–Oklahoma City Barons (EDM) | 76 | 40 | 25 | 2 | 9 | 91 | 240 | 228 |
| x–Houston Aeros (MIN) | 76 | 40 | 26 | 5 | 5 | 90 | 212 | 199 |
| e–San Antonio Rampage (FLA) | 76 | 29 | 38 | 2 | 7 | 67 | 195 | 241 |

== Statistical leaders ==
=== Leading skaters ===
The following players are sorted by points, then goals. Updated as of the end of the regular season.

GP = Games played; G = Goals; A = Assists; Pts = Points; +/– = P Plus–minus; PIM = Penalty minutes

| Player | Team | GP | G | A | Pts | PIM |
|---|---|---|---|---|---|---|
| Brandon Pirri | Rockford IceHogs | 76 | 22 | 53 | 75 | 72 |
| Jeff Taffe | Hershey Bears | 73 | 18 | 53 | 71 | 27 |
| Chad Kolarik | Wilkes-Barre/Scranton Penguins | 76 | 31 | 37 | 68 | 55 |
| Mark Arcobello | Oklahoma City Barons | 74 | 22 | 46 | 68 | 48 |
| Linden Vey | Manchester Monarchs | 74 | 22 | 45 | 67 | 32 |
| Jonathan Audy-Marchessault | Springfield Falcons | 74 | 21 | 46 | 67 | 65 |
| T. J. Hensick | Peoria Rivermen | 76 | 19 | 48 | 67 | 50 |
| Tyler Johnson | Syracuse Crunch | 62 | 37 | 28 | 65 | 34 |
| Brett Connolly | Syracuse Crunch | 71 | 31 | 32 | 63 | 53 |
| Kris Newbury | Connecticut Whale | 70 | 20 | 42 | 62 | 127 |

=== Leading goaltenders ===
The following goaltenders with a minimum 1500 minutes played lead the league in goals against average. Updated as of the end of the regular season.

GP = Games played; TOI = Time on ice (in minutes); SA = Shots against; GA = Goals against; SO = Shutouts; GAA = Goals against average; SV% = Save percentage; W = Wins; L = Losses; OT = Overtime/shootout loss

| Player | Team | GP | TOI | SA | GA | SO | GAA | SV% | W | L | OT |
|---|---|---|---|---|---|---|---|---|---|---|---|
| Jeff Zatkoff | Wilkes-Barre/Scranton Penguins | 49 | 2799 | 1131 | 90 | 5 | 1.93 | 0.920 | 26 | 20 | 0 |
| Danny Taylor | Abbotsford Heat | 40 | 2108 | 927 | 72 | 3 | 2.05 | 0.922 | 18 | 10 | 2 |
| Robin Lehner | Binghamton Senators | 31 | 1841 | 1046 | 65 | 3 | 2.12 | 0.938 | 18 | 10 | 2 |
| Magnus Hellberg | Milwaukee Admirals | 39 | 2107 | 991 | 75 | 6 | 2.14 | 0.924 | 22 | 13 | 0 |
| Niklas Svedberg | Providence Bruins | 48 | 2872 | 1384 | 104 | 4 | 2.17 | 0.925 | 37 | 8 | 2 |

== Calder Cup playoffs ==
Conference quarterfinals | Conference semifinals
1 | Providence | 3
8 | Hershey | 2
1 | Providence | 3
5 | Wilkes-Barre/Scranton | 4
2 | Springfield | 3
7 | Manchester | 1
Eastern Conference
3 | Syracuse | 3
6 | Portland | 0
2 | Springfield | 0
3 | Syracuse | 4
4 | Binghamton | 0
5 | Wilkes-Barre/Scranton | 3
Note: Pairings are re-seeded after the first round.
1 | Texas | 3
8 | Milwaukee | 1
1 | Texas | 1
5 | Oklahoma City | 4
2 | Toronto | 3
7 | Rochester | 0
Western Conference
3 | Grand Rapids | 3
6 | Houston | 2
2 | Toronto | 2
3 | Grand Rapids | 4
4 | Charlotte | 2
5 | Oklahoma City | 3

Conference finals
5 | Wilkes-Barre/Scranton | 1
3 | Syracuse | 4
5 | Oklahoma City | 3
3 | Grand Rapids | 4

Calder Cup Final
E3 | Syracuse | 2
W3 | Grand Rapids | 4

== AHL awards ==
Calder Cup : Grand Rapids Griffins
Les Cunningham Award : Tyler Johnson, Syracuse
John B. Sollenberger Trophy : Brandon Pirri, Rockford
Willie Marshall Award : Tyler Johnson, Syracuse
Dudley "Red" Garrett Memorial Award : Tyler Toffoli, Manchester
Eddie Shore Award : Justin Schultz, Oklahoma City
Aldege "Baz" Bastien Memorial Award : Niklas Svedberg, Providence
Harry "Hap" Holmes Memorial Award : Jeff Zatkoff & Brad Thiessen, Wilkes-Barre/Scranton
Louis A. R. Pieri Memorial Award : Willie Desjardins, Texas
Fred T. Hunt Memorial Award : Brandon Davidson, Oklahoma City
Yanick Dupre Memorial Award : Michael Zigomanis, Toronto
Jack A. Butterfield Trophy : Tomas Tatar, Grand Rapids
Richard F. Canning Trophy : Syracuse Crunch
Robert W. Clarke Trophy : Grand Rapids Griffins
Macgregor Kilpatrick Trophy: Providence Bruins
Frank Mathers Trophy: Syracuse Crunch
Norman R. "Bud" Poile Trophy: Grand Rapids Griffins
Emile Francis Trophy : Providence Bruins
F. G. "Teddy" Oke Trophy: Springfield Falcons
Sam Pollock Trophy: Toronto Marlies
John D. Chick Trophy: Texas Stars
James C. Hendy Memorial Award:
Thomas Ebright Memorial Award:
James H. Ellery Memorial Awards:
Ken McKenzie Award:
Michael Condon Memorial Award:

=== All-star teams ===
First All-Star Team

- Justin Schultz (D)
- Sami Vatanen (D)
- Jonathan Audy-Marchessault (LW)
- Tyler Johnson (C)
- Gustav Nyquist (RW)
- Niklas Svedberg (G)

Second All-Star Team

- Mark Barberio (D)
- Adam Clendening (D)
- Matt Fraser (LW)
- Jeff Taffe (C)
- Brett Connolly (RW)
- Curtis McElhinney (G)

== Milestones ==
- Abbotsford Heat The Marlies, the American Hockey League affiliate of the Toronto Maple Leafs, were tied against the Abbotsford Heat when first Steve McCarthy scored a short-handed goal and then Ben Street scored from the faceoff circle. The two goals in three seconds tied a professional hockey record. Greg Wyshynski of Yahoo's Puck Daddy blog reported that the ECHL, formerly the East Coast Hockey League, had two goals scored in the same span during a 1993 game. However, the comparable record in the NHL is four seconds. Before Thursday, the fastest two goals had been scored in the AHL was five seconds. The Heat is an affiliate of the NHL's Calgary Flames, and the team went on to win the game, 3-0 on November 1, 2012.
- Abbotsford Heat goaltender Barry Brust set a record for longest shutout streak by not allowing any goals for 268 minutes and 17 seconds. The previous record was 249:51, set by Johnny Bower with the Cleveland Barons in 1957.
- Hershey Bears forward Jon DiSalvatore became the 82nd player in AHL history to record 500 career points on November 25, 2012.
- Toronto Marlies forward Keith Aucoin became the 11th player in AHL history to record 800 career points on December 16, 2012.
- Rockford IceHogs forward Martin St. Pierre became the 83rd player in AHL history to record 500 career points on January 5, 2013.
- Providence Bruins forward Graham Mink became the 84th player in AHL history to record 500 career points on February 16, 2013.
- Hershey Bears forward Boyd Kane became the 85th player in AHL history to record 500 career points on March 23, 2013.
- Hershey Bears forward Jeff Taffe became the 86th player in AHL history to record 500 career points on April 20, 2013.

== See also ==
- List of AHL seasons
- 2012 in ice hockey
- 2013 in ice hockey

| Preceded by 2011–12 AHL season | AHL seasons | Succeeded by 2013–14 AHL season |
