= List of Philadelphia Flyers draft picks =

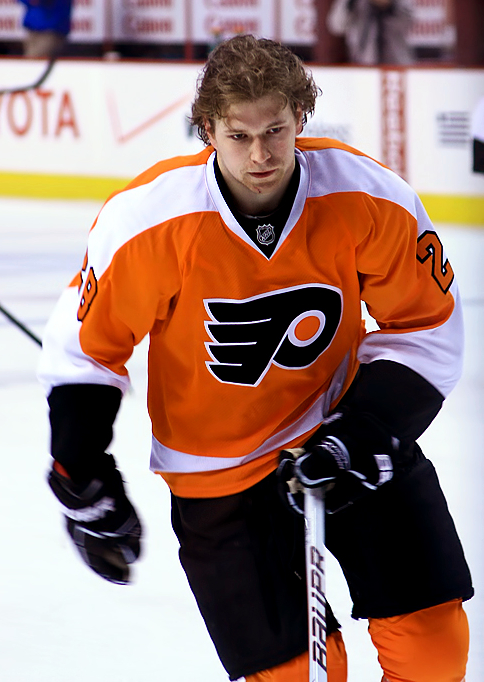
Claude Giroux was selected by Philadelphia in the first round at the 2006 draft.

The Philadelphia Flyers are a professional ice hockey team based in Philadelphia, Pennsylvania. They are members of the Metropolitan Division of the National Hockey League's (NHL) Eastern Conference. The Flyers were founded in 1967 as one of six expansion teams, increasing the size of the NHL at that time to 12 teams.

As of the 2026 NHL entry draft, the Flyers have selected 541 players in the NHL entry draft since their first draft in 1967. They selected an additional ten players from 1986 to 1994 in the short-lived NHL supplemental draft, which was for selecting collegiate players who were not eligible for the standard entry draft. As of the completion of the 2025–26 season, 233 Flyers draft picks have appeared in at least one NHL game.

The Flyers are one of the few teams to have never earned the right to draft first overall by means of having the worst record in the league. Though they had the worst record during the 2006–07 season, they dropped to the second overall pick after the Chicago Blackhawks won the draft lottery. The only time the Flyers have picked first overall was in 1975 when they acquired the pick from the Washington Capitals, trading Bill Clement, Don McLean, and the Flyers first-rounder (18th overall) so they could select Mel Bridgman.

== Key ==
^{*} Spent entire NHL career with the Flyers
^{**} Played at least one game with the Flyers
^{†} Inducted into the Hockey Hall of Fame and spent entire NHL career with the Flyers
^{‡} Inducted into the Hockey Hall of Fame and played at least one game with the Flyers

General terms and abbreviations
Term or abbreviation	Definition
Draft	The year that the player was selected
Rd	The round of the draft in which the player was selected
Pick	The overall position in the draft at which the player was selected
Pos	The position of the player at the time of the draft
Nat	Nationality
GP	Games played
Ref	Reference(s)
S	Supplemental draft selection
—	Does not apply

Position abbreviations
Abbreviation	Definition
G	Goaltender
D	Defense
LW	Left wing
C	Center
RW	Right wing
F	Forward

Nationality
(Austria)	Austria
(Belarus)	Belarus
(Canada)	Canada
(Czech Republic)	Czech Republic
(Denmark)	Denmark
(Finland)	Finland
(Germany)	Germany
(Latvia)	Latvia
(Lithuania)	Lithuania
(Russia)	Russia
(Slovakia)	Slovakia
(Sweden)	Sweden
(Switzerland)	Switzerland
(United Kingdom)	United Kingdom
(United States)	United States

Games played totals are complete to the end of the 2025–26 NHL season with active players' totals bolded.

== Draft picks ==
List of all players drafted by the Philadelphia Flyers and their NHL career regular season games played total
Draft	Rd	Pick	Player	Pos	Nat	Team	League	GP	Ref
1967	1	5	Serge Bernier ^{**}	C	(Canada)	Sorel Eperviers	QJHL	302	
1967	2	14	Al Sarault	D	(Canada)	Pembroke Lumber Kings	CJAHL	—	
1968	1	8	Lew Morrison ^{**}	RW	(Canada)	Flin Flon Bombers	WCHL	564	
1969	1	6	Bob Currier	RW	(Canada)	Cornwall Royals	CJAHL	—	
1969	2	17	Bobby Clarke ^{†}	C	(Canada)	Flin Flon Bombers	WCHL	1144	
1969	3	28	Willie Brossart ^{**}	D	(Canada)	Estevan Bruins	WCHL	129	
1969	4	40	Michel Belhumeur ^{**}	G	(Canada)	Drummondville Rangers	QJHL	65	
1969	5	52	Dave Schultz ^{**}	LW	(Canada)	Sorel Eperviers	QJHL	535	
1969	6	64	Don Saleski ^{**}	RW	(Canada)	Regina Pats	SJHL	543	
1969	8	81	Claude Chartre	C	(Canada)	Drummondville Rangers	QJHL	—	
1970	2	18	Bill Clement ^{**}	C	(Canada)	Ottawa 67's	OHA	719	
1970	3	32	Bob Kelly ^{**}	LW	(Canada)	Oshawa Generals	OHA	837	
1970	4	46	Jacques Lapierre	D	(Canada)	Shawinigan Bruins	QMJHL	—	
1970	5	60	Doug Kerslake	RW	(Canada)	Edmonton Oil Kings	WCHL	—	
1970	6	74	Dennis Giannini	LW	(Canada)	London Knights	OHA	—	
1970	7	87	Hank Nowak	LW	(Canada)	Oshawa Generals	OHA	180	
1970	8	99	Gary Cunningham	D	(Canada)	St. Catharines Black Hawks	OHA	—	
1970	9	109	Jean Daigle	LW	(Canada)	Sorel Eperviers	QMJHL	—	
1971	1	8	Larry Wright ^{**}	C	(Canada)	Regina Pats	WCHL	106	
1971	1	9	Pierre Plante ^{**}	RW	(Canada)	Drummondville Rangers	QMJHL	599	
1971	3	36	Glen Irwin	D	(Canada)	Estevan Bruins	WCHL	—	
1971	4	50	Ted Scharf	RW	(Canada)	Kitchener Rangers	OHA	—	
1971	5	64	Don McCulloch	D	(Canada)	Niagara Falls Flyers	OHA	—	
1971	6	78	Yvon Bilodeau	D	(Canada)	Estevan Bruins	WCHL	—	
1971	7	92	Bobby Gerrard	RW	(Canada)	Regina Pats	WCHL	—	
1971	8	106	Jerome Mrazek ^{*}	G	(Canada)	University of Minnesota Duluth	WCHA	1	
1972	1	7	Bill Barber ^{†}	LW	(Canada)	Kitchener Rangers	OHA	903	
1972	2	23	Tom Bladon ^{**}	D	(Canada)	Edmonton Oil Kings	WCHL	610	
1972	3	39	Jimmy Watson ^{*}	D	(Canada)	Calgary Centennials	WCHL	613	
1972	4	55	Al MacAdam ^{**}	RW	(Canada)	Charlottetown Islanders	MJAHL	864	
1972	5	71	Daryl Fedorak	G	(Canada)	Victoria Cougars	WCHL	—	
1972	6	87	Dave Hasting	G	(Canada)	Charlottetown Islanders	MJAHL	—	
1972	7	103	Serge Beaudoin	D	(Canada)	Trois-Rivieres Ducs	QMJHL	3	
1972	8	119	Pat Russell	RW	(Canada)	Vancouver Nats	WCHL	—	
1972	9	135	Ray Boutin	G	(Canada)	Sorel Eperviers	QMJHL	—	
1973	2	20	Larry Goodenough ^{**}	D	(Canada)	London Knights	OHA	242	
1973	2	26	Brent Leavins	LW	(Canada)	Swift Current Broncos	WCHL	—	
1973	3	40	Bob Stumpf	RW	(Canada)	New Westminster Bruins	WCHL	10	
1973	3	42	Mike Clarke	C	(Canada)	Calgary Centennials	WCHL	—	
1973	4	58	Dale Cook	LW	(Canada)	Victoria Cougars	WCHL	—	
1973	5	74	Michel Latreille	D	(Canada)	Montreal Red White and Blue	QMJHL	—	
1973	6	90	Doug Ferguson	D	(Canada)	Hamilton Red Wings	OHA	—	
1973	7	106	Tom Young	F	(Canada)	Sudbury Wolves	OHA	—	
1973	8	122	Norm Barnes ^{**}	D	(Canada)	Michigan State University	CCHA	156	
1973	9	137	Dan O'Donohue	D	(Canada)	Sault Ste. Marie Greyhounds	OHA	—	
1973	10	153	Brian Dick	RW	(Canada)	Winnipeg Jets	WCHL	—	
1974	2	35	Don McLean	D	(Canada)	Sudbury Wolves	OHA	9	
1974	3	53	Bob Sirois ^{**}	RW	(Canada)	Montreal Red White and Blue	QMJHL	286	
1974	4	71	Randy Andreachuk	C	(Canada)	Kamloops Chiefs	WCHL	—	
1974	5	89	Dennis Sobchuk	C	(Canada)	Regina Pats	WCHL	35	
1974	6	107	Willie Friesen	LW	(Canada)	Swift Current Broncos	WCHL	—	
1974	7	125	Reggie Lemelin	G	(Canada)	Sherbrooke Beavers	QMJHL	507	
1974	8	142	Steve Short	LW	(United States)	Minnesota Junior Stars	MWJHL	6	
1974	9	159	Peter MacKenzie	D	(Canada)	St. Francis Xavier University	CIAU	—	
1974	10	174	Marcel Labrosse	C	(Canada)	Shawinigan Dynamos	QMJHL	—	
1974	11	189	Scott Jessee	RW	(United States)	Michigan Tech University	WCHA	—	
1974	12	201	Richard Guay	G	(Canada)	Chicoutimi Sagueneens	QMJHL	—	
1974	13	211	Brad Morrow	D	(United States)	University of Minnesota	WCHA	—	
1974	14	219	Craig Arvidson	LW	(United States)	University of Minnesota Duluth	WCHA	—	
1975	1	1	Mel Bridgman ^{**}	C	(Canada)	Victoria Cougars	WCHL	977	
1975	3	54	Bob Ritchie ^{**}	LW	(Canada)	Sorel Eperviers	QMJHL	29	
1975	4	72	Rick St. Croix ^{**}	G	(Canada)	Oshawa Generals	OHA	131	
1975	5	90	Gary Morrison ^{*}	F	(United States)	University of Michigan	CCHA	43	
1975	6	108	Paul Holmgren ^{**}	F	(United States)	University of Minnesota	WCHA	527	
1975	7	126	Dana Decker	LW	(United States)	Michigan Tech University	WCHA	—	
1975	9	160	Viktor Khatulev	D	(Latvia)	Dynamo Riga	USSR	—	
1975	10	175	Duffy Smith	D	(Canada)	Bowling Green State University	CCHA	—	
1976	1	17	Mark Suzor ^{**}	D	(Canada)	Kingston Canadians	OHA	64	
1976	2	35	Drew Callander ^{**}	C	(Canada)	Regina Pats	WCHL	39	
1976	3	53	Craig Hanmer	D	(United States)	Mohawk Valley Comets	NAHL	—	
1976	4	71	Dave Hynek	D	(Canada)	Kingston Canadians	OHA	—	
1976	5	89	Robin Lang	D	(Canada)	Cornell University	ECAC	—	
1976	6	107	Paul Klasinski	LW	(United States)	St. Paul Vulcans	MWJHL	—	
1976	7	117	Ray Kurpis	RW	(United States)	Austin Mavericks	MWJHL	—	
1977	1	17	Kevin McCarthy ^{**}	D	(Canada)	Winnipeg Monarchs	WCHL	537	
1977	2	35	Tom Gorence ^{**}	RW	(United States)	University of Minnesota	CCHA	303	
1977	3	53	Dave Hoyda ^{**}	LW	(Canada)	Portland Winter Hawks	WCHL	132	
1977	4	67	Yves Guillemette	G	(Canada)	Shawinigan Dynamos	QMJHL	—	
1977	4	71	Rene Hamelin	RW	(Canada)	Shawinigan Dynamos	QMJHL	—	
1977	5	89	Dan Clark	D	(Canada)	Kamloops Chiefs	WCHL	4	
1977	6	107	Alain Chaput	C	(Canada)	Sorel Eperviers	QMJHL	—	
1977	7	123	Richard Dalpe	C	(Canada)	Trois-Rivieres Draveurs	QMJHL	—	
1977	8	135	Pete Peeters ^{**}	G	(Canada)	Medicine Hat Tigers	WCHL	489	
1977	8	136	Clint Eccles	C	(Canada)	Kamloops Chiefs	WCHL	—	
1977	8	139	Mike Greeder	D	(United States)	St. Paul Vulcans	MWJHL	—	
1977	9	150	Tom Bauer	LW	(United States)	Providence College	HE	—	
1977	9	151	Michel Bauman	D	(Canada)	Hull Olympiques	QMJHL	—	
1977	9	153	Bruce Crowder	F	(Canada)	University of New Hampshire	HE	243	
1977	10	158	Rob Nicholson	D	(United States)	St. Paul Vulcans	MWJHL	—	
1977	10	159	Dave Isherwood	C	(Canada)	Winnipeg Monarchs	WCHL	—	
1977	10	161	Steve Jones	G	(Canada)	Ohio State University	CCHA	—	
1977	11	165	Jim Trainor	D	(United States)	Harvard University	ECAC	—	
1977	11	166	Barry Duench	C	(Canada)	Kitchener Rangers	OHA	—	
1977	11	168	Rod McNair	D	(Canada)	Ohio State University	CCHA	—	
1977	12	172	Mike Laycock	G	(Canada)	Brown University	ECAC	—	
1978	1	6	Behn Wilson ^{**}	D	(Canada)	Kingston Canadians	OHA	601	
1978	1	7	Ken Linseman ^{**}	F	(Canada)	Birmingham Bulls	WHA	860	
1978	1	14	Danny Lucas ^{*}	RW	(Canada)	Sault Ste. Marie Greyhounds	OHA	6	
1978	2	33	Mike Simurda	RW	(Canada)	Kingston Canadians	OHA	—	
1978	3	37	Gord Salt	RW	(Canada)	Michigan Tech University	WCHA	—	
1978	3	50	Glen Cochrane ^{**}	D	(Canada)	Victoria Cougars	WCHL	411	
1978	4	67	Russ Wilderman	C	(Canada)	Seattle Breakers	WCHL	—	
1978	5	83	Brad Tamblyn	D	(Canada)	Toronto Marlboros	OHA	—	
1978	6	100	Mark Taylor ^{**}	F	(Canada)	University of North Dakota	WCHA	209	
1978	7	117	Mike Ewanouski	RW	(United States)	Boston College	HE	—	
1978	8	126	Jerry Price	G	(Canada)	Portland Winter Hawks	WCHL	—	
1978	8	134	Darre Switzer	LW	(Canada)	Medicine Hat Tigers	WCHL	—	
1978	9	151	Greg Francis	D	(Canada)	St. Lawrence University	ECAC	—	
1978	10	167	Rick Berard	D	(Canada)	Saint Mary's University	CIAU	—	
1978	10	168	Don Lucia	D	(United States)	University of Notre Dame	CCHA	—	
1978	11	182	Mike Berge	F	(United States)	University of North Dakota	WCHA	—	
1978	11	183	Ken Moore	G	(United States)	Clarkson University	CCHA	—	
1978	12	195	Jim Olson	RW	(United States)	St. Paul Vulcans	USHL	—	
1978	12	198	Anton Stastny	F	(Slovakia)	HC Slovan Bratislava	TCH	650	
1979	1	14	Brian Propp ^{**}	LW	(Canada)	Brandon Wheat Kings	WHL	1016	
1979	2	22	Blake Wesley ^{**}	D	(Canada)	Portland Winter Hawks	WHL	298	
1979	2	35	Pelle Lindbergh ^{*}	G	(Sweden)	AIK IF	SEL	157	
1979	3	56	Lindsay Carson ^{**}	C	(Canada)	Billings Bighorns	WHL	373	
1979	4	77	Don Gillen ^{**}	RW	(Canada)	Brandon Wheat Kings	WHL	35	
1979	5	98	Thomas Eriksson ^{*}	D	(Sweden)	Djurgardens IF	SEL	208	
1979	6	119	Gord Williams ^{*}	F	(Canada)	Lethbridge Broncos	WHL	2	
1980	1	21	Mike Stothers ^{**}	D	(Canada)	Kingston Canadians	OHA	30	
1980	2	42	Jay Fraser	LW	(Canada)	Ottawa 67's	OHA	—	
1980	3	63	Paul Mercier	D	(Canada)	Sudbury Wolves	OHA	—	
1980	4	84	Taras Zytynsky	D	(Canada)	Montreal Juniors	QMJHL	—	
1980	5	105	Dan Held	F	(Canada)	Seattle Breakers	WHL	—	
1980	6	126	Brian Tutt	D	(Canada)	Calgary Wranglers	WHL	7	
1980	7	147	Ross Fitzpatrick ^{*}	F	(Canada)	Western Michigan University	CCHA	20	
1980	8	168	Mark Botell ^{*}	D	(Canada)	Brantford Alexanders	OHA	32	
1980	9	189	Peter Dineen	D	(Canada)	Kingston Canadians	OHA	13	
1980	10	195	Bob O'Brien	RW	(Canada)	Dixie Beehives	OPJHL	—	
1980	10	210	Andy Brickley ^{**}	LW	(United States)	University of New Hampshire	HE	385	
1981	1	16	Steve Smith ^{**}	D	(Canada)	Sault Ste. Marie Greyhounds	OHL	17	
1981	2	37	Rich Costello	F	(United States)	Natick High School	HS-MA	12	
1981	3	47	Barry Tabobondung	D	(Canada)	Oshawa Generals	OHL	—	
1981	3	58	Ken Strong	F	(Canada)	Peterborough Petes	OHL	15	
1981	4	65	Dave Michayluk ^{**}	LW	(Canada)	Regina Pats	WHL	14	
1981	4	79	Ken Latta	RW	(Canada)	Sault Ste. Marie Greyhounds	OHL	—	
1981	5	100	Justin Hanley	C	(Canada)	Kingston Canadians	OHL	—	
1981	6	121	Andre Villeneuve	D	(Canada)	Chicoutimi Sagueneens	QMJHL	—	
1981	7	137	Vladimir Svitek	F	(Slovakia)	HC Kosice	TCH	—	
1981	7	142	Gil Hudon	G	(Canada)	Prince Albert Raiders	SJHL	—	
1981	8	163	Steve Taylor	LW	(United States)	Providence College	HE	—	
1981	9	184	Len Hachborn ^{**}	C	(Canada)	Brantford Alexanders	OHL	102	
1981	10	205	Steve Tsujiura	C	(Canada)	Medicine Hat Tigers	WHL	—	
1982	1	4	Ron Sutter ^{**}	C	(Canada)	Lethbridge Broncos	WHL	1093	
1982	3	46	Miroslav Dvorak ^{*}	D	(Czech Republic)	HC Ceske Budejovice	TCH	193	
1982	3	47	Bill Campbell	D	(Canada)	Montreal Juniors	QMJHL	—	
1982	4	77	Michael Hjalm	W	(Sweden)	Modo Hockey	SEL	—	
1982	5	98	Todd Bergen ^{*}	F	(Canada)	Prince Albert Raiders	SJHL	14	
1982	6	119	Ron Hextall ^{**}	G	(Canada)	Brandon Wheat Kings	WHL	608	
1982	7	140	Dave Brown ^{**}	F	(Canada)	Saskatoon Blades	WHL	729	
1982	8	161	Alain Lavigne	RW	(Canada)	Shawinigan Cataractes	QMJHL	—	
1982	9	182	Magnus Roupe ^{*}	LW	(Sweden)	Farjestad BK	SEL	40	
1982	10	203	Tom Allen	G	(United States)	Michigan Tech University	WCHA	—	
1982	11	224	Rick Gal	F	(Canada)	Lethbridge Broncos	WHL	—	
1982	12	245	Mark Vichorek	D	(United States)	Sioux City Musketeers	USHL	—	
1983	2	41	Peter Zezel ^{**}	C	(Canada)	Toronto Marlboros	OHL	873	
1983	3	44	Derrick Smith ^{**}	LW	(Canada)	Peterborough Petes	OHL	537	
1983	4	81	Allen Bourbeau	C	(United States)	Acton-Boxborough High School	HS-MA	—	
1983	5	101	Jerome Carrier	D	(Canada)	Verdun Juniors	QMJHL	—	
1983	6	121	Rick Tocchet ^{**}	RW	(Canada)	Sault Ste. Marie Greyhounds	OHL	1144	
1983	7	141	Bob Mormina	F	(Canada)	Longueuil Chevaliers	QMJHL	—	
1983	8	161	Pelle Eklund ^{**}	C	(Sweden)	AIK IF	SEL	594	
1983	9	181	Robbie Nichols	RW	(Canada)	Kitchener Rangers	OHL	—	
1983	10	201	Bill McCormack	C	(United States)	Westminster School	HS-CT	—	
1983	11	221	Brian Jopling	G	(United States)	Williston Northampton School	HS-MA	—	
1983	12	241	Harold Duvall	LW	(United States)	Belmont Hill School	HS-MA	—	
1984	2	22	Greg Smyth ^{**}	D	(Canada)	London Knights	OHL	229	
1984	2	27	Scott Mellanby ^{**}	RW	(Canada)	Henry Carr Crusaders	MetJHL	1431	
1984	2	37	Jeff Chychrun ^{**}	D	(Canada)	Kingston Canadians	OHL	262	
1984	3	43	Dave McLay	F	(Canada)	Kelowna Wings	WHL	—	
1984	3	47	John Stevens ^{**}	D	(Canada)	Oshawa Generals	OHL	53	
1984	4	79	David Hanson	C	(United States)	Grand Forks High School	HS-ND	—	
1984	5	100	Brian Dobbin ^{**}	RW	(Canada)	London Knights	OHL	63	
1984	6	121	John Dzikowski	C	(Canada)	Brandon Wheat Kings	WHL	—	
1984	7	142	Tom Allen	D	(Canada)	Kitchener Rangers	OHL	—	
1984	8	163	Luke Vitale	F	(Canada)	Henry Carr Crusaders	MetJHL	—	
1984	9	184	Billy Powers	F	(United States)	Matignon High School	HS-MA	—	
1984	10	204	Daryn Fersovich	F	(Canada)	St. Albert Saints	AJHL	—	
1984	12	245	Juraj Bakos	D	(Slovakia)	HC Kosice	TCH	—	
1985	1	21	Glen Seabrooke ^{*}	C	(Canada)	Peterborough Petes	OHL	19	
1985	2	42	Bruce Rendall	LW	(Canada)	Chatham Maroons	OPJHL	—	
1985	3	48	Darryl Gilmour	G	(Canada)	Moose Jaw Warriors	WHL	—	
1985	3	63	Shane Whelan	C	(Canada)	Oshawa Generals	OHL	—	
1985	4	84	Paul Marshall	D	(United States)	Northwood School	HS-NY	—	
1985	5	105	Daril Holmes	RW	(Canada)	Kingston Canadians	OHL	—	
1985	6	126	Ken Alexander	D	(United States)	Kitchener Rangers	OHL	—	
1985	7	147	Tony Horacek ^{**}	LW	(Canada)	Kelowna Wings	WHL	154	
1985	8	168	Mike Cusack	F	(United States)	Dubuque Fighting Saints	USHL	—	
1985	9	189	Gord Murphy ^{**}	D	(Canada)	Oshawa Generals	OHL	862	
1985	11	231	Rod Williams	RW	(Canada)	Kelowna Wings	WHL	—	
1985	12	252	Paul Maurice	D	(Canada)	Windsor Compuware Spitfires	OHL	—	
1986	1	20	Kerry Huffman ^{**}	D	(Canada)	Guelph Platers	OHL	401	
1986	2	23	Jukka-Pekka Seppo	C	(Finland)	Vaasan Sport	FIN-3	—	
1986	2	28	Kent Hawley	C	(Canada)	Ottawa 67's	OHL	—	
1986	4	83	Mark Bar	D	(Canada)	Peterborough Petes	OHL	—	
1986	6	125	Steve Scheifele	RW	(United States)	Stratford Cullitons	OPJHL	—	
1986	7	146	Sami Wahlsten	F	(Finland)	HC TPS	SML	—	
1986	8	167	Murray Baron ^{**}	D	(Canada)	Vernon Lakers	BCJHL	988	
1986	9	184	Blaine Rude	F	(United States)	Fergus Falls High School	HS-ND	—	
1986	10	209	Shaun Sabol ^{*}	D	(United States)	St. Paul Vulcans	USHL	2	
1986	11	230	Brett Lawrence	RW	(United States)	Rochester Jr. Americans	EJHL	—	
1986	12	251	Dan Stephano	G	(United States)	Northwood School	HS-NY	—	
1987	1	20	Darren Rumble ^{**}	D	(Canada)	Kitchener Rangers	OHL	193	
1987	2	30	Jeff Harding ^{*}	RW	(Canada)	St. Michael's Buzzers	MetJBHL	15	
1987	3	62	Martin Hostak ^{*}	RW	(Czech Republic)	HC Sparta Praha	TCH	55	
1987	4	83	Tomaz Eriksson	LW	(Sweden)	Djurgardens IF	SEL	—	
1987	5	104	Bill Gall	D	(United States)	New Hampton School	HS-NH	—	
1987	6	125	Tony Link	D	(United States)	Diamond Hill School	HS-AK	—	
1987	7	146	Marc Strapon	D	(United States)	Hayward High School	HS-WI	—	
1987	8	167	Darryl Ingham	RW	(Canada)	University of Manitoba	CIAU	—	
1987	9	188	Bruce MacDonald	RW	(United States)	Loomis Chaffee School	HS-CT	—	
1987	10	209	Steve Morrow	D	(United States)	Westminster School	HS-CT	—	
1987	11	230	Darius Rusnak	C	(Slovakia)	HC Slovan Bratislava	TCH	—	
1987	12	251	Dale Roehl	G	(United States)	Minnetonka High School	HS-MN	—	
1987	S	S21	David Whyte	LW	(United States)	Boston College	HE	—	
1988	1	14	Claude Boivin ^{**}	LW	(Canada)	Drummondville Voltigeurs	QMJHL	132	
1988	2	35	Pat Murray ^{*}	LW	(Canada)	Michigan State University	CCHA	25	
1988	3	56	Craig Fisher ^{**}	LW	(Canada)	Oshawa Legionaires	MetJHL	12	
1988	3	63	Dominic Roussel ^{**}	G	(Canada)	Trois-Rivieres Draveurs	QMJHL	205	
1988	4	77	Scott LaGrand	G	(United States)	Hotchkiss School	HS-CT	—	
1988	5	98	Edward O'Brien	LW	(United States)	Cushing Academy	HS-MA	—	
1988	6	119	Gord Frantti	D	(United States)	Calumet High School	HS-MI	—	
1988	7	140	Jamie Cooke	RW	(Canada)	Bramalea Blues	MetJHL	—	
1988	8	161	Johan Salle	D	(Sweden)	Malmo IF	SEL	—	
1988	9	182	Brian Arthur	D	(Canada)	Etobicoke Capitals	CJBHL	—	
1988	10	203	Jeff Dandreta	RW	(United States)	Cushing Academy	HS-MA	—	
1988	11	224	Scott Billey	RW	(United States)	Madison Capitols	USHL	—	
1988	12	245	Dragomir Kadlec	D	(Czech Republic)	HC Dukla Jihlava	TCH	—	
1988	S	S19	Paul Connell	G	(United States)	Bowling Green State University	CCHA	—	
1989	2	33	Greg Johnson	C	(Canada)	Thunder Bay Flyers	USHL	785	
1989	2	34	Patrik Juhlin ^{*}	LW	(Sweden)	Vasteras IK	SEL	56	
1989	4	72	Reid Simpson ^{**}	LW	(Canada)	Prince Albert Raiders	WHL	301	
1989	6	117	Niklas Eriksson	RW	(Sweden)	Leksands IF	SEL	—	
1989	7	138	John Callahan	C	(United States)	Belmont Hill School	HS-MA	—	
1989	8	159	Sverre Sears	D	(United States)	Belmont Hill School	HS-MA	—	
1989	9	180	Glen Wisser	F	(United States)	Philadelphia Junior Flyers	Jr. B	—	
1989	10	201	Al Kummu	D	(Canada)	Humboldt Broncos	SJHL	—	
1989	11	222	Matt Brait	D	(United States)	St. Michael's Buzzers	MetJHL	—	
1989	12	243	James Pollio	LW	(United States)	Vermont Academy	HS-VT	—	
1989	S	S17	Jamie Baker	D	(United States)	University of Windsor	CIAU	—	
1990	1	4	Mike Ricci ^{**}	C	(Canada)	Peterborough Petes	OHL	1099	
1990	2	25	Chris Simon	LW	(Canada)	Ottawa 67's	OHL	782	
1990	2	40	Mikael Renberg ^{**}	RW	(Sweden)	Lulea HF	SEL	661	
1990	2	42	Terran Sandwith	D	(Canada)	Tri-City Americans	USHL	8	
1990	3	44	Kimbi Daniels ^{*}	C	(Canada)	Swift Current Broncos	WHL	27	
1990	3	46	Bill Armstrong	D	(Canada)	Oshawa Generals	OHL	—	
1990	3	47	Chris Therien ^{**}	D	(Canada)	Ottawa 67's	OHL	764	
1990	3	52	Al Kinisky	D	(United States)	Seattle Thunderbirds	WHL	—	
1990	5	88	Dan Kordic ^{*}	D	(Canada)	Medicine Hat Tigers	WHL	197	
1990	6	109	Vyacheslav Butsayev ^{**}	C	(Russia)	HC CSKA Moscow	USSR	132	
1990	8	151	Patric Englund	LW	(Sweden)	AIK IF	SEL	—	
1990	9	172	Toni Porkka	D	(Finland)	Lukko	SML	—	
1990	10	193	Greg Hanson	D	(United States)	Bloomington Kennedy High School	HS-MN	—	
1990	11	214	Tommy Soderstrom ^{**}	G	(Sweden)	Djurgardens IF	SEL	156	
1990	12	235	Billy Lund	C	(United States)	Roseau High School	HS-MN	—	
1990	S	S4	Steve Beadle	D	(United States)	Michigan State University	CCHA	—	
1990	S	S9	Ray Letourneau	G	(United States)	Yale University	ECAC	—	
1991	1	6	Peter Forsberg ^{‡}	C	(Sweden)	Modo Hockey	SEL	708	
1991	3	50	Yanick Dupre ^{*}	LW	(Canada)	Drummondville Voltigeurs	QMJHL	35	
1991	4	86	Aris Brimanis ^{**}	D	(United States)	Bowling Green State University	CCHA	113	
1991	5	94	Yanick Degrace	G	(Canada)	Trois-Rivieres Draveurs	QMJHL	—	
1991	6	116	Clayton Norris	RW	(Canada)	Medicine Hat Tigers	WHL	—	
1991	6	122	Dmitri Yushkevich ^{**}	D	(Russia)	Torpedo Yaroslavl	USSR	786	
1991	7	138	Andrei Lomakin ^{**}	LW	(Russia)	HC Dynamo Moscow	USSR	215	
1991	9	182	Jim Bode	LW	(United States)	Robbinsdale Armstrong High School	HS-MN	—	
1991	10	204	Josh Bartell	D	(United States)	Rome Free Academy	HS-NY	—	
1991	11	226	Neil Little ^{*}	G	(Canada)	Rensselaer Polytechnic Institute	ECAC	2	
1991	12	248	John Parco	C	(Canada)	Belleville Bulls	OHL	—	
1991	S	S6	Angelo Libertucci	G	(Canada)	Bowling Green State University	CCHA	—	
1991	S	S12	Brendan Locke	RW	(United States)	Merrimack College	HE	—	
1992	1	7	Ryan Sittler	LW	(United States)	Nichols School	HS-NY	—	
1992	1	15	Jason Bowen ^{**}	D	(Canada)	Tri-City Americans	WHL	77	
1992	2	31	Denis Metlyuk	LW	(Russia)	HC Lada Togliatti	USSR	—	
1992	5	103	Vladislav Boulin	D	(Russia)	Dizel Penza	USSR-2	—	
1992	6	127	Roman Zolotov	D	(Russia)	HC Dynamo Moscow	USSR	—	
1992	7	151	Kirk Daubenspeck	G	(United States)	Culver Military Academy	HS-IN	—	
1992	8	175	Claude Jutras	RW	(Canada)	Hull Olympiques	QMJHL	—	
1992	9	199	Jonas Hakansson	LW	(Sweden)	Malmo IF	SEL	—	
1992	10	223	Chris Herperger	C	(Canada)	Swift Current Broncos	WHL	169	
1992	11	247	Patrice Paquin	LW	(Canada)	Beauport Harfangs	QMJHL	—	
1992	S	S7	Garett MacDonald	D	(Canada)	Northern Michigan University	CCHA	—	
1993	2	36	Janne Niinimaa ^{**}	D	(Finland)	Oulun Karpat	SML	741	
1993	3	71	Vaclav Prospal ^{**}	LW	(Czech Republic)	HC Ceske Budejovice	CSSR U18	1108	
1993	3	77	Milos Holan ^{**}	D	(Czech Republic)	HC Vitkovice	TCH	49	
1993	5	114	Vladimir Krechin	LW	(Russia)	Traktor Chelyabinsk	IHL	—	
1993	6	140	Mike Crowley	D	(United States)	Bloomington Jefferson High School	HS-MN	67	
1993	7	166	Aaron Israel	G	(United States)	Harvard University	ECAC	—	
1993	8	192	Paul Healey ^{**}	LW	(Canada)	Prince Albert Raiders	WHL	77	
1993	9	218	Tripp Tracy	G	(United States)	Harvard University	ECAC	—	
1993	9	226	E. J. Bradley	C	(United States)	Tabor Academy	HS-MA	—	
1993	10	244	Jeff Staples	D	(Canada)	Brandon Wheat Kings	WHL	—	
1993	11	270	Ken Hemenway	D	(United States)	Alaska Allstars	AAAAHA	—	
1993	S	S10	Shannon Finn	D	(Canada)	University of Illinois at Chicago	CCHA	—	
1994	3	62	Artem Anisimov	D	(Russia)	Itil Kazan	IHL	—	
1994	4	88	Adam Magarrell	D	(Canada)	Brandon Wheat Kings	WHL	—	
1994	4	101	Sebastien Vallee	LW	(Canada)	Victoriaville Tigres	QMJHL	—	
1994	6	140	Alexander Selivanov	RW	(Russia)	HC Spartak Moscow	IHL	459	
1994	7	166	Colin Forbes ^{**}	F	(Canada)	Sherwood Park Crusaders	AJHL	311	
1994	8	192	Derek Diener	D	(Canada)	Lethbridge Hurricanes	WHL	—	
1994	8	202	Ray Giroux	D	(Canada)	Powassan Hawks	NOJHL	38	
1994	9	218	Johan Hedberg	G	(Sweden)	Leksands IF	SEL	373	
1994	10	244	Andre Payette	LW	(Canada)	Sault Ste. Marie Greyhounds	OHL	—	
1994	11	270	Jan Lipiansky	F	(Slovakia)	HC Slovan Bratislava	SVK	—	
1994	S	S10	Kirk Nielsen	RW	(United States)	Harvard University	ECAC	6	
1995	1	22	Brian Boucher ^{**}	G	(United States)	Tri-City Americans	WHL	328	
1995	2	48	Shane Kenny	D	(Canada)	Owen Sound Platers	OHL	—	
1995	4	100	Radovan Somik ^{*}	LW	(Slovakia)	MHC Martin	SVK	113	
1995	6	132	Dmitri Tertyshny ^{*}	D	(Russia)	Traktor Chelyabinsk	IHL	62	
1995	6	135	Jamie Sokolsky	D	(Canada)	Belleville Bulls	OHL	—	
1995	6	152	Martin Spanhel	LW	(Czech Republic)	HC Zlin	ELH	10	
1995	7	178	Martin Streit	F	(Czech Republic)	HC Olomouc	Czech	—	
1995	8	204	Ruslan Shafikov	F	(Russia)	Salavat Yulaev Ufa	IHL	—	
1995	9	230	Jeff Lank ^{*}	D	(Canada)	Prince Albert Raiders	WHL	2	
1996	1	15	Dainius Zubrus ^{**}	RW	(Lithuania)	Caledon Canadians	MJAHL	1293	
1996	3	64	Chester Gallant	RW	(Canada)	Niagara Falls Thunder	OHL	—	
1996	5	124	Per-Ragnar Bergkvist	G	(Sweden)	Leksands IF	SEL	—	
1996	5	133	Jesse Boulerice ^{**}	RW	(United States)	Detroit Whalers	OHL	172	
1996	7	187	Roman Malov	C	(Russia)	Avangard Omsk	RSL	—	
1996	8	213	Jeff Milleker	C	(Canada)	Moose Jaw Warriors	WHL	—	
1997	2	30	Jean-Marc Pelletier ^{**}	G	(United States)	Cornell University	ECAC	7	
1997	2	50	Pat Kavanagh ^{**}	RW	(Canada)	Peterborough Petes	OHL	14	
1997	3	62	Kris Mallette	D	(Canada)	Kelowna Rockets	WHL	—	
1997	4	103	Mikhail Chernov	D	(Russia)	Torpedo Yaroslavl	RSL	—	
1997	6	158	Jordon Flodell	D	(Canada)	Moose Jaw Warriors	WHL	—	
1997	7	164	Todd Fedoruk ^{**}	LW	(Canada)	Kelowna Rockets	WHL	545	
1997	8	214	Marko Kauppinen	D	(Finland)	JYP	U20	—	
1997	9	240	Par Styf	D	(Sweden)	Modo Hockey	J20	—	
1998	1	22	Simon Gagne ^{**}	LW	(Canada)	Quebec Remparts	QMJHL	822	
1998	2	42	Jason Beckett	D	(Canada)	Seattle Thunderbirds	WHL	—	
1998	2	51	Ian Forbes	D	(Canada)	Guelph Storm	OHL	—	
1998	4	109	J. P. Morin	D	(Canada)	Drummondville Voltigeurs	QMJHL	—	
1998	5	124	Francis Belanger	LW	(Canada)	Rimouski Oceanic	QMJHL	10	
1998	5	139	Garrett Prosofsky	C	(Canada)	Saskatoon Blades	WHL	—	
1998	6	168	Antero Niittymaki ^{**}	G	(Finland)	HC TPS	SML	234	
1998	7	175	Cam Ondrik	G	(Canada)	Medicine Hat Tigers	WHL	—	
1998	7	195	Tomas Divisek ^{*}	RW	(Czech Republic)	HC Slavia Praha	ELH	5	
1998	8	222	Lubomir Pistek	RW	(Slovakia)	HC Slovan Bratislava	SVK U18	—	
1998	9	243	Petr Hubacek ^{*}	C	(Czech Republic)	HC Kometa Brno	CZE-1	6	
1998	9	253	Bruno St. Jacques ^{**}	D	(Canada)	Baie-Comeau Drakkar	QMJHL	67	
1998	9	258	Sergei Skrobot	D	(Russia)	HC Dynamo Moscow	RUS-2	—	
1999	1	22	Maxime Ouellet ^{**}	G	(Canada)	Quebec Remparts	QMJHL	12	
1999	4	119	Jeff Feniak	D	(Canada)	Calgary Hitmen	WHL	—	
1999	6	160	Konstantin Rudenko	F	(Russia)	Severstal Cherepovets	RSL	—	
1999	7	200	Pavel Kasparik	F	(Czech Republic)	IHC Pisek	ELH	—	
1999	7	208	Vaclav Pletka ^{*}	LW	(Czech Republic)	HC Ocelari Trinec	ELH	1	
1999	8	224	David Nystrom	LW	(Sweden)	Frolunda HC	SEL	—	
2000	1	28	Justin Williams ^{**}	RW	(Canada)	Plymouth Whalers	OHL	1264	
2000	3	94	Alexander Drozdetsky	RW	(Russia)	SKA Saint Petersburg	RSL	—	
2000	6	171	Roman Cechmanek ^{**}	G	(Czech Republic)	HC Vsetin	ELH	212	
2000	6	195	Colin Shields	F	(United Kingdom)	Cleveland Jr. Barons	NAHL	—	
2000	7	210	John Eichelberger	F	(United States)	Green Bay Gamblers	USHL	—	
2000	7	227	Guillaume Lefebvre ^{**}	LW	(Canada)	Rouyn-Noranda Huskies	QMJHL	39	
2000	8	259	Regan Kelly	D	(Canada)	Nipawin Hawks	SJHL	—	
2000	9	287	Milan Kopecky	F	(Czech Republic)	HC Slavia Praha	ELH	—	
2001	1	27	Jeff Woywitka	D	(Canada)	Red Deer Rebels	WHL	278	
2001	3	95	Patrick Sharp ^{**}	C	(Canada)	University of Vermont	ECAC	939	
2001	5	146	Jussi Timonen ^{*}	D	(Finland)	KalPa	SML	14	
2001	5	150	Bernd Bruckler	G	(Austria)	Tri-City Storm	USHL	—	
2001	5	158	Roman Malek	G	(Czech Republic)	HC Slavia Praha	ELH	—	
2001	6	172	Dennis Seidenberg ^{**}	D	(Germany)	Adler Mannheim	DEL	859	
2001	6	177	Andrei Razin	C	(Russia)	Metallurg Magnitogorsk	RSL	—	
2001	7	208	Thierry Douville	D	(Canada)	Baie-Comeau Drakkar	QMJHL	—	
2001	7	225	David Printz ^{*}	D	(Sweden)	Great Falls Americans	AWHL	13	
2002	1	4	Joni Pitkanen ^{**}	D	(Finland)	Oulun Karpat	SML	535	
2002	4	105	Rosario Ruggeri	D	(Canada)	Chicoutimi Sagueneens	QMJHL	—	
2002	4	126	Konstantin Baranov	F	(Russia)	Chelmet Chelyabinsk	RSL	—	
2002	5	161	Dov Grumet-Morris	G	(United States)	Harvard University	ECAC	—	
2002	6	192	Nikita Korovkin	D	(Russia)	Kamloops Blazers	WHL	—	
2002	6	193	Joey Mormina	D	(Canada)	Colgate University	ECAC	1	
2002	7	201	Mathieu Brunelle	LW	(Canada)	Victoriaville Tigres	QMJHL	—	
2003	1	11	Jeff Carter ^{**}	C	(Canada)	Sault Ste. Marie Greyhounds	OHL	1321	
2003	1	24	Mike Richards ^{**}	C	(Canada)	Kitchener Rangers	OHL	749	
2003	3	69	Colin Fraser	C	(Canada)	Red Deer Rebels	WHL	359	
2003	3	81	Stefan Ruzicka ^{*}	RW	(Slovakia)	MHC Nitra	SVK-2	55	
2003	3	85	Alexandre Picard ^{**}	D	(Canada)	Halifax Mooseheads	QMJHL	253	
2003	3	87	Ryan Potulny ^{**}	C	(United States)	Lincoln Stars	USHL	126	
2003	3	95	Rick Kozak	RW	(Canada)	Brandon Wheat Kings	WHL	—	
2003	4	108	Kevin Romy	C	(Switzerland)	Geneve-Servette HC	NLA	—	
2003	5	140	David Tremblay	G	(Canada)	Hull Olympiques	QMJHL	—	
2003	6	191	Rejean Beauchemin	G	(Canada)	Prince Albert Raiders	WHL	—	
2003	6	193	Ville Hostikka	G	(Finland)	SaiPa	U20	—	
2004	3	92	Rob Bellamy	RW	(United States)	New England Jr. Coyotes	EJHL	—	
2004	4	101	R. J. Anderson	D	(United States)	Centennial High School	HS-MN	—	
2004	4	124	David Laliberte ^{*}	RW	(Canada)	Prince Edward Island Rocket	QMJHL	11	
2004	5	144	Chris Zarb	D	(United States)	Tri-City Storm	USHL	—	
2004	5	149	Gino Pisellini	RW	(United States)	Plymouth Whalers	OHL	—	
2004	6	170	Ladislav Scurko	C	(Slovakia)	Spisska Nova Ves	SVK-2	—	
2004	6	171	Frederik Cabana	C	(Canada)	Halifax Mooseheads	QMJHL	—	
2004	8	232	Martin Houle ^{*}	G	(Canada)	Cape Breton Screaming Eagles	QMJHL	1	
2004	8	253	Travis Gawryletz	D	(Canada)	Trail Smoke Eaters	BCHL	—	
2004	9	286	Triston Grant ^{**}	LW	(Canada)	Vancouver Giants	WHL	11	
2004	9	291	John Carter	C	(United States)	Brewster Bulldogs	EmJHL	—	
2005	1	29	Steve Downie ^{**}	RW	(Canada)	Windsor Spitfires	OHL	434	
2005	3	91	Oskars Bartulis ^{*}	D	(Latvia)	Moncton Wildcats	QMJHL	66	
2005	4	119	Jeremy Duchesne ^{*}	G	(Canada)	Halifax Mooseheads	QMJHL	1	
2005	5	152	Josh Beaulieu	C	(Canada)	London Knights	OHL	—	
2005	6	174	John Flatters	D	(Canada)	Red Deer Rebels	WHL	—	
2005	7	215	Matt Clackson	RW	(United States)	Chicago Steel	USHL	—	
2006	1	22	Claude Giroux ^{**}	RW	(Canada)	Gatineau Olympiques	QMJHL	1345	
2006	2	39	Andreas Nodl ^{**}	RW	(Austria)	Sioux Falls Stampede	USHL	183	
2006	2	42	Mike Ratchuk	D	(United States)	U.S. NTDP	NAHL	—	
2006	2	55	Denis Bodrov	D	(Russia)	HC Lada Togliatti	RSL	—	
2006	3	79	Jon Matsumoto	C	(Canada)	Bowling Green State University	CCHA	14	
2006	4	101	Joonas Lehtivuori	D	(Finland)	Ilves	SML	—	
2006	4	109	Jakub Kovar	G	(Czech Republic)	HC Ceske Budejovice	ELH	—	
2006	5	145	Jon Rheault	RW	(United States)	Providence College	HE	5	
2006	6	175	Michael Dupont	G	(Switzerland)	Baie-Comeau Drakkar	QMJHL	—	
2006	7	205	Andrei Popov	RW	(Russia)	Traktor Chelyabinsk	RUS-2	—	
2007	1	2	James van Riemsdyk ^{**}	LW	(United States)	U.S. NTDP	NAHL	1154	
2007	2	41	Kevin Marshall ^{*}	D	(Canada)	Lewiston Maineiacs	QMJHL	10	
2007	3	66	Garrett Klotz	LW	(Canada)	Saskatoon Blades	WHL	—	
2007	5	122	Mario Kempe	RW	(Sweden)	St. John's Fog Devils	QMJHL	70	
2007	6	152	Jon Kalinski ^{*}	LW	(Canada)	Bonnyville Pontiacs	AJHL	22	
2007	6	161	Patrick Maroon	LW	(United States)	London Knights	OHL	848	
2007	7	182	Brad Phillips	G	(United States)	U.S. NTDP	NAHL	—	
2008	1	19	Luca Sbisa ^{**}	D	(Switzerland)	Lethbridge Hurricanes	WHL	549	
2008	3	67	Marc-Andre Bourdon ^{*}	D	(Canada)	Rouyn-Noranda Huskies	QMJHL	45	
2008	3	84	Jacob DeSerres	G	(Canada)	Seattle Thunderbirds	WHL	—	
2008	6	178	Zac Rinaldo ^{**}	C	(Canada)	Mississauga St. Michael's Majors	OHL	374	
2008	7	196	Joacim Eriksson	G	(Sweden)	Brynas IF	SEL	1	
2009	3	81	Adam Morrison	G	(Canada)	Saskatoon Blades	WHL	—	
2009	3	87	Simon Bertilsson	D	(Sweden)	Brynas IF	SEL	—	
2009	5	142	Nicola Riopel	G	(Canada)	Moncton Wildcats	QMJHL	—	
2009	6	153	Dave Labrecque	C	(Canada)	Shawinigan Cataractes	QMJHL	—	
2009	6	172	Eric Wellwood ^{*}	LW	(Canada)	Windsor Spitfires	OHL	31	
2009	7	196	Oliver Lauridsen ^{*}	D	(Denmark)	St. Cloud State University	WCHA	16	
2010	3	89	Michael Chaput	C	(Canada)	Lewiston Maineiacs	QMJHL	182	
2010	4	119	Tye McGinn ^{**}	LW	(Canada)	Gatineau Olympiques	QMJHL	89	
2010	5	149	Michael Parks	RW	(United States)	Cedar Rapids RoughRiders	USHL	—	
2010	5	179	Nick Luukko	D	(United States)	The Gunnery	HS-CT	—	
2010	7	206	Ricard Blidstrand	D	(Sweden)	AIK IF	J20	—	
2010	7	209	Brendan Ranford	LW	(Canada)	Kamloops Blazers	WHL	1	
2011	1	8	Sean Couturier ^{*}	C	(Canada)	Drummondville Voltigeurs	QMJHL	952	
2011	3	68	Nick Cousins ^{**}	C	(Canada)	Sault Ste. Marie Greyhounds	OHL	723	
2011	4	116	Colin Suellentrop	D	(United States)	Oshawa Generals	OHL	—	
2011	4	118	Marcel Noebels	LW	(Germany)	Seattle Thunderbirds	WHL	—	
2011	6	176	Petr Placek	RW	(Czech Republic)	Hotchkiss School	HS-CT	—	
2011	7	206	Derek Mathers	RW	(Canada)	Peterborough Petes	OHL	—	
2012	1	20	Scott Laughton ^{**}	C	(Canada)	Oshawa Generals	OHL	745	
2012	2	45	Anthony Stolarz ^{**}	G	(United States)	Corpus Christi IceRays	NAHL	168	
2012	3	78	Shayne Gostisbehere ^{**}	D	(United States)	Union College	ECAC	744	
2012	4	111	Fredric Larsson	D	(Sweden)	Brynas IF	J20	—	
2012	4	117	Taylor Leier ^{*}	LW	(Canada)	Portland Winterhawks	WHL	55	
2012	5	141	Reece Willcox	D	(Canada)	Merritt Centennials	BCHL	—	
2012	7	201	Valeri Vasiliev	D	(Russia)	HC Spartak Moscow	MHL	—	
2013	1	11	Samuel Morin ^{*}	D	(Canada)	Rimouski Oceanic	QMJHL	29	
2013	2	41	Robert Hagg ^{**}	D	(Sweden)	Modo Hockey	SEL	345	
2013	3	72	Tyrell Goulbourne ^{*}	LW	(Canada)	Kelowna Rockets	WHL	11	
2013	5	132	Terrance Amorosa	D	(Canada)	Holderness School	HS-NH	—	
2013	6	162	Merrick Madsen	G	(United States)	Proctor Academy	HS-NH	—	
2013	7	192	David Drake	D	(United States)	Des Moines Buccaneers	USHL	—	
2014	1	17	Travis Sanheim ^{*}	D	(Canada)	Calgary Hitmen	WHL	660	
2014	2	48	Nicolas Aube-Kubel ^{**}	RW	(Canada)	Val-d'Or Foreurs	QMJHL	310	
2014	3	86	Mark Friedman ^{**}	D	(Canada)	Waterloo Black Hawks	USHL	93	
2014	5	138	Oskar Lindblom ^{**}	LW	(Sweden)	Brynas IF	J20	337	
2014	6	168	Radel Fazleev	C	(Russia)	Calgary Hitmen	WHL	—	
2014	7	198	Jesper Pettersson	D	(Sweden)	Linkopings HC	SHL	—	
2015	1	7	Ivan Provorov ^{**}	D	(Russia)	Brandon Wheat Kings	WHL	778	
2015	1	24	Travis Konecny ^{*}	RW	(Canada)	Ottawa 67's	OHL	723	
2015	3	70	Felix Sandstrom ^{*}	G	(Sweden)	Brynas IF	SHL	30	
2015	3	90	Matej Tomek	G	(Slovakia)	Topeka RoadRunners	NAHL	—	
2015	4	98	Samuel Dove-McFalls	LW	(Canada)	Saint John Sea Dogs	QMJHL	—	
2015	4	104	Mikhail Vorobyev ^{*}	C	(Russia)	Tolpar Ufa	MHL	35	
2015	5	128	David Kase ^{*}	RW	(Czech Republic)	Pirati Chomutov	CZE-1	7	
2015	6	158	Cooper Marody	C	(United States)	Sioux Falls Stampede	USHL	7	
2015	7	188	Ivan Fedotov ^{*}	G	(Russia)	HC Neftekhimik Nizhnekamsk	KHL	29	
2016	1	22	German Rubtsov ^{*}	C	(Russia)	Team Russia U18	MHL	4	
2016	2	36	Pascal Laberge	C	(Canada)	Victoriaville Tigres	QMJHL	—	
2016	2	48	Carter Hart ^{**}	G	(Canada)	Everett Silvertips	WHL	245	
2016	2	52	Wade Allison ^{*}	RW	(Canada)	Tri-City Storm	USHL	75	
2016	3	82	Carsen Twarynski ^{*}	LW	(Canada)	Calgary Hitmen	WHL	22	
2016	4	109	Connor Bunnaman ^{*}	C	(Canada)	Kitchener Rangers	OHL	54	
2016	5	139	Linus Hogberg ^{*}	D	(Sweden)	Vaxjo Lakers	J20	5	
2016	5	169	Tanner Laczynski ^{**}	C	(United States)	Lincoln Stars	USHL	56	
2016	6	172	Anthony Salinitri	C	(Canada)	Sarnia Sting	OHL	—	
2016	7	199	David Bernhardt	D	(Sweden)	Djurgardens IF	J20	—	
2017	1	2	Nolan Patrick ^{**}	C	(Canada)	Brandon Wheat Kings	WHL	222	
2017	1	27	Morgan Frost ^{**}	C	(Canada)	Sault Ste. Marie Greyhounds	OHL	392	
2017	2	35	Isaac Ratcliffe ^{*}	LW	(Canada)	Guelph Storm	OHL	10	
2017	3	80	Kirill Ustimenko	G	(Russia)	HC Dinamo Saint Petersburg	MHL	—	
2017	4	106	Matthew Strome	LW	(Canada)	Hamilton Bulldogs	OHL	—	
2017	4	107	Maxim Sushko ^{*}	RW	(Belarus)	Owen Sound Attack	OHL	2	
2017	5	137	Noah Cates ^{*}	LW	(United States)	Omaha Lancers	USHL	317	
2017	6	168	Olle Lycksell ^{**}	C	(Sweden)	Linkopings HC	J20	52	
2017	7	196	Wyatt Kalynuk	D	(Canada)	Bloomington Thunder	USHL	26	
2018	1	14	Joel Farabee ^{**}	LW	(United States)	U.S. NTDP	USHL	497	
2018	1	19	Jay O'Brien	C	(United States)	Thayer Academy	HS-MA	—	
2018	2	50	Adam Ginning ^{*}	D	(Sweden)	Linkopings HC	SHL	16	
2018	4	112	Jack St. Ivany	D	(United States)	Sioux Falls Stampede	USHL	53	
2018	5	127	Wyatte Wylie	D	(United States)	Everett Silvertips	WHL	—	
2018	5	143	Samuel Ersson ^{**}	G	(Sweden)	Brynas IF	SHL	143	
2018	6	174	Gavin Hain	C	(United States)	U.S. NTDP	USHL	—	
2018	7	205	Marcus Westfalt	C	(Sweden)	Brynas IF	SHL	—	
2019	1	14	Cam York ^{*}	D	(United States)	U.S. NTDP	USHL	309	
2019	2	34	Bobby Brink ^{**}	RW	(United States)	Sioux City Musketeers	USHL	214	
2019	3	72	Ronnie Attard ^{*}	D	(United States)	Tri-City Storm	USHL	29	
2019	4	103	Mason Millman	D	(Canada)	Saginaw Spirit	OHL	—	
2019	6	165	Egor Serdyuk	RW	(Russia)	Victoriaville Tigres	QMJHL	—	
2019	6	169	Roddy Ross	G	(Canada)	Seattle Thunderbirds	WHL	—	
2019	7	196	Bryce Brodzinski	RW	(United States)	Blaine High School	HS-MN	—	
2020	1	23	Tyson Foerster ^{*}	RW	(Canada)	Barrie Colts	OHL	195	
2020	2	54	Emil Andrae ^{**}	D	(Sweden)	HV71	J20	107	
2020	4	94	Zayde Wisdom	RW	(Canada)	Kingston Frontenacs	OHL	—	
2020	5	135	Elliot Desnoyers ^{*}	LW	(Canada)	Halifax Mooseheads	QMJHL	4	
2020	6	178	Connor McClennon	RW	(Canada)	Winnipeg Ice	WHL	—	
2021	2	46	Samu Tuomaala	RW	(Finland)	Oulun Karpat	U20	—	
2021	3	78	Aleksei Kolosov ^{*}	G	(Belarus)	HC Dinamo Minsk	KHL	21	
2021	4	110	Brian Zanetti	D	(Switzerland)	HC Lugano	U20-Elit	—	
2021	5	158	Ty Murchison ^{*}	D	(United States)	U.S. NTDP	USHL	3	
2021	6	174	Ethan Samson	D	(Canada)	Prince George Cougars	WHL	—	
2021	7	206	Owen McLaughin	C	(United States)	Mount Saint Charles Academy	HS-RI	—	
2022	1	5	Cutter Gauthier	LW	(United States)	U.S. NTDP	USHL	159	
2022	3	69	Devin Kaplan ^{*}	RW	(United States)	U.S. NTDP	USHL	1	
2022	5	133	Alex Bump ^{*}	LW	(United States)	Omaha Lancers	USHL	17	
2022	6	165	Hunter McDonald ^{*}	D	(United States)	Chicago Steel	USHL	1	
2022	7	197	Santeri Sulku	LW	(Finland)	Jokerit	U20	—	
2022	7	220	Alexis Gendron	RW	(Canada)	Blainville-Boisbriand Armada	QMJHL	—	
2023	1	7	Matvei Michkov ^{*}	RW	(Russia)	SKA Saint Petersburg	KHL	161	
2023	1	22	Oliver Bonk ^{*}	D	(Canada)	London Knights	OHL	1	
2023	2	51	Carson Bjarnason	G	(Canada)	Brandon Wheat Kings	WHL	—	
2023	3	87	Yegor Zavragin	G	(Russia)	Mamonty Yugry	MHL	—	
2023	3	95	Denver Barkey ^{*}	C	(Canada)	London Knights	OHL	43	
2023	4	103	Cole Knuble ^{*}	C	(United States)	Fargo Force	USHL	—	
2023	4	120	Alex Ciernik	LW	(Slovakia)	Sodertalje SK	Allsv	—	
2023	5	135	Carter Sotheran	D	(Canada)	Portland Winterhawks	WHL	—	
2023	6	172	Ryan MacPherson	C	(Canada)	Leamington Flyers	GOJHL	—	
2023	7	199	Matteo Mann	D	(Canada)	Chicoutimi Sagueneens	QMJHL	—	
2024	1	13	Jett Luchanko ^{*}	C	(Canada)	Guelph Storm	OHL	8	
2024	2	51	Jack Berglund	C	(Sweden)	Farjestad BK	SHL	—	
2024	2	59	Spencer Gill	D	(Canada)	Rimouski Oceanic	QMJHL	—	
2024	4	107	Heikki Ruohonen	C	(Finland)	Kiekko-Espoo	U20	—	
2024	5	148	Noah Powell	RW	(United States)	Dubuque Fighting Saints	USHL	—	
2024	6	173	Ilya Pautov	RW	(Russia)	Krasnaya Armiya	MHL	—	
2024	7	205	Austin Moline	D	(United States)	Shattuck-Saint Mary's	HS-MN	—	
2025	1	6	Porter Martone ^{*}	RW	(Canada)	Brampton Steelheads	OHL	9	
2025	1	12	Jack Nesbitt	C	(Canada)	Windsor Spitfires	OHL	—	
2025	2	38	Carter Amico	D	(United States)	U.S. NTDP	USHL	—	
2025	2	40	Jack Murtagh	LW	(United States)	U.S. NTDP	USHL	—	
2025	2	48	Shane Vansaghi	RW	(United States)	Michigan State University	B1G	—	
2025	2	57	Matthew Gard	C	(Canada)	Red Deer Rebels	WHL	—	
2025	5	132	Max Westergard	LW	(Finland)	Frolunda HC	SHL	—	
2025	5	157	Luke Vlooswyk	D	(Canada)	Red Deer Rebels	WHL	—	
2025	6	164	Nathan Quinn	C	(Canada)	Quebec Remparts	QMJHL	—	
2026	1	27	Maksim Sokolovskii	D	(Russia)	London Knights	OHL	—	
2026	2	53	Brek Liske	D	(Canada)	Everett Silvertips	WHL	—	
2026	2	62	Martin Psohlavec	G	(Czech Republic)	HC Karlovy Vary	Czech	—	
2026	4	120	Marek Sklenicka	G	(Czech Republic)	Seattle Thunderbirds	WHL	—	
2026	5	136	KJ Sauer	C	(United States)	Andover High School	HS-MN	—	
2026	7	213	Max Laatikainen	D	(Finland)	Kiekko-Espoo	U20	—	

== Gallery ==
Draft picks who played for the team in previous seasons

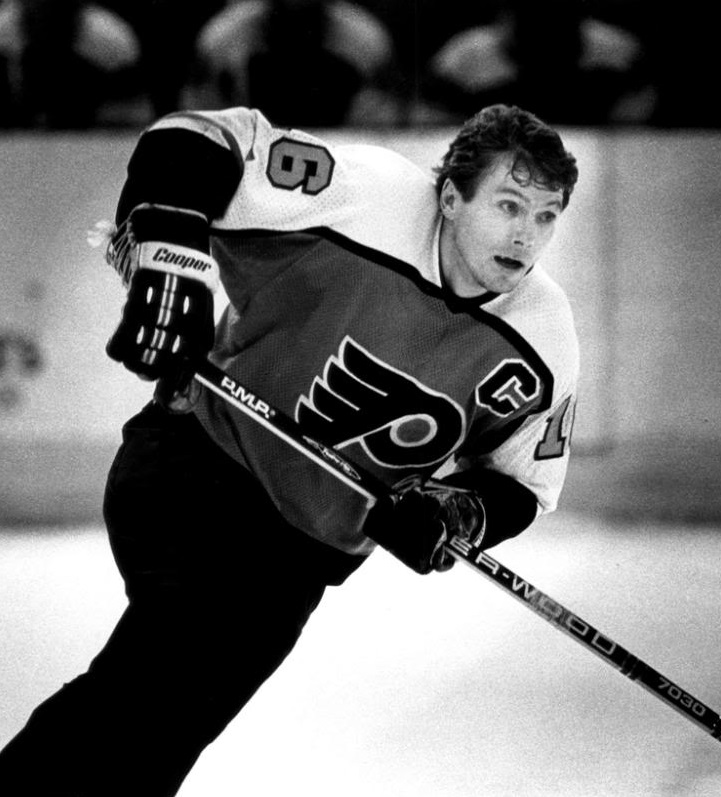
Selected in the second round of the 1969 draft, Hockey Hall of Famer Bobby Clarke played his entire career with the Flyers and leads all Flyers draft picks in assists (852) and points (1,210).

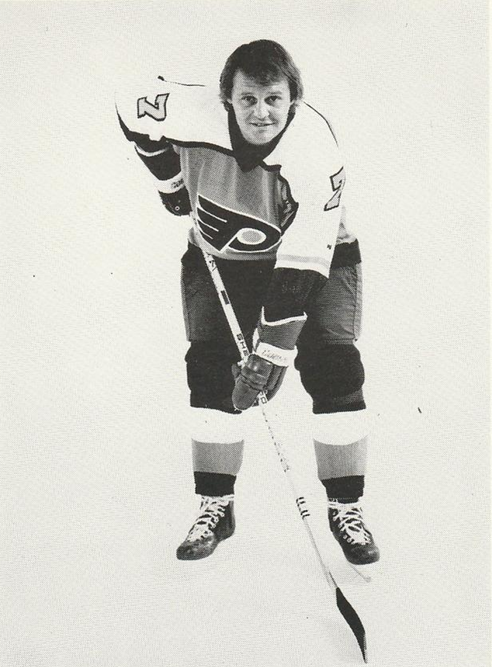
Selected in the first round of the 1972 draft, Hockey Hall of Famer Bill Barber played his entire NHL career with the Flyers.

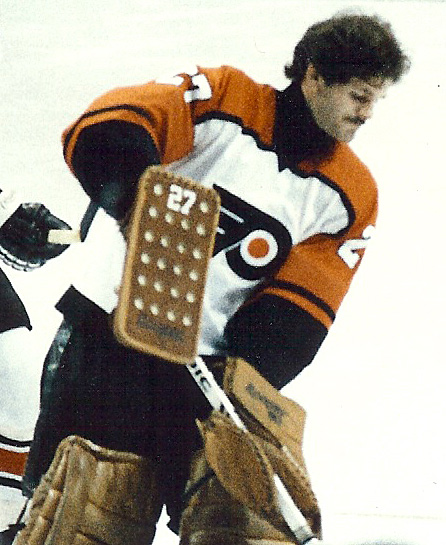
Ron Hextall was selected by Philadelphia in the sixth round at the 1982 draft and leads all Flyers draft picks in games played among goaltenders (608) and wins (296).

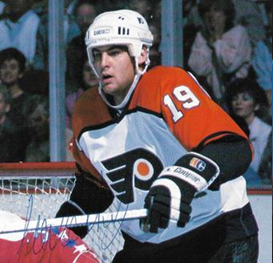
Scott Mellanby was selected by Philadelphia in the second round at the 1984 draft and leads all Flyers draft picks in games played (1,431).

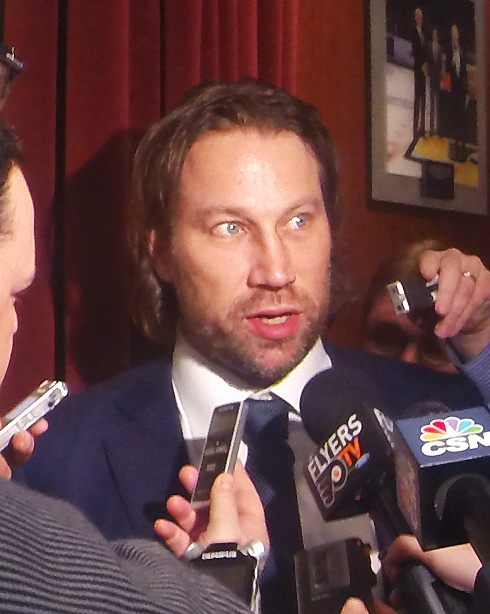
In 1991, Hockey Hall of Famer Peter Forsberg became the first player born outside Canada ever selected by the Flyers in the first round of the NHL entry draft.

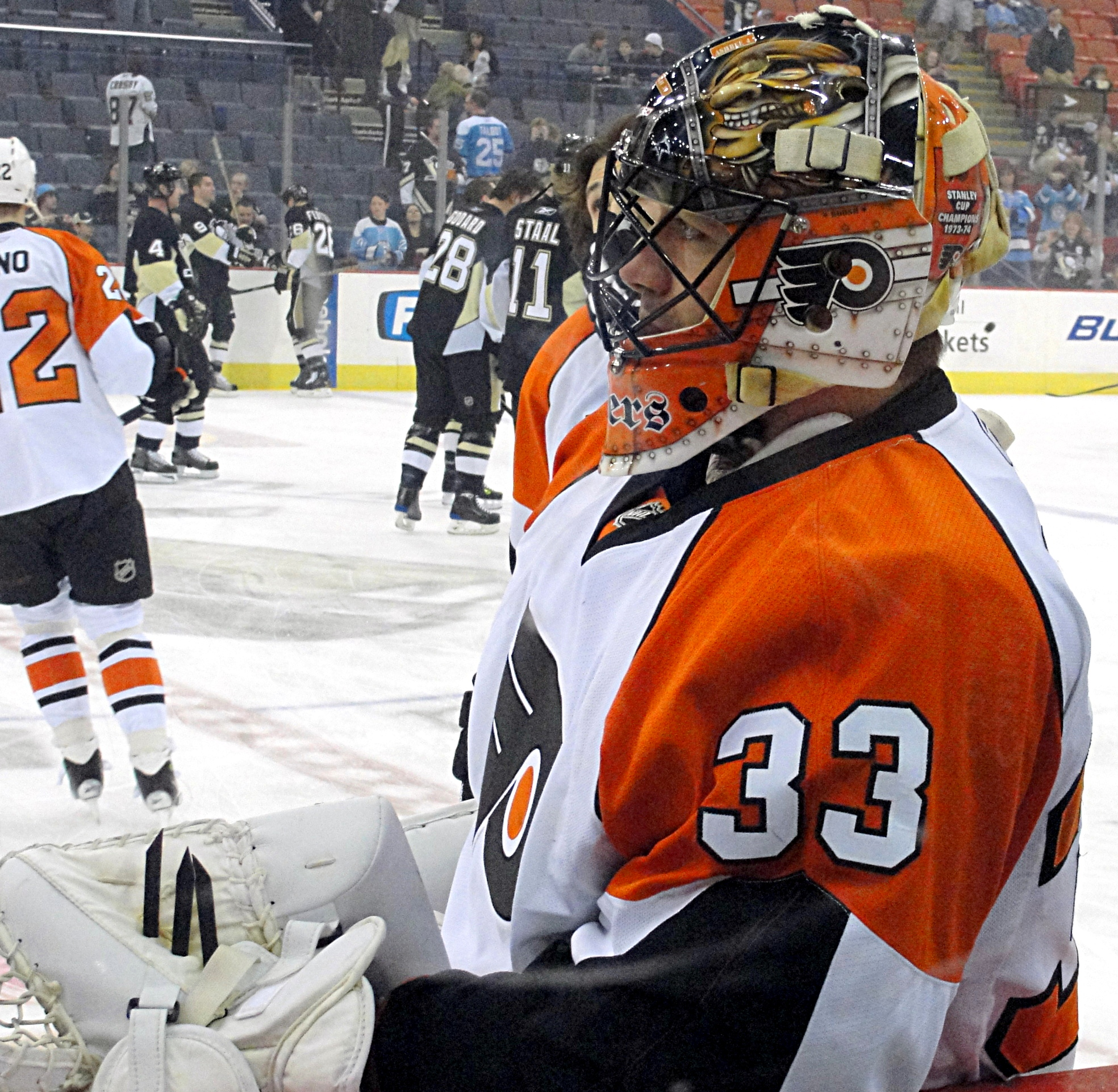
In 1995, Brian Boucher became the first goaltender ever selected by the Flyers in the first round of the NHL entry draft.

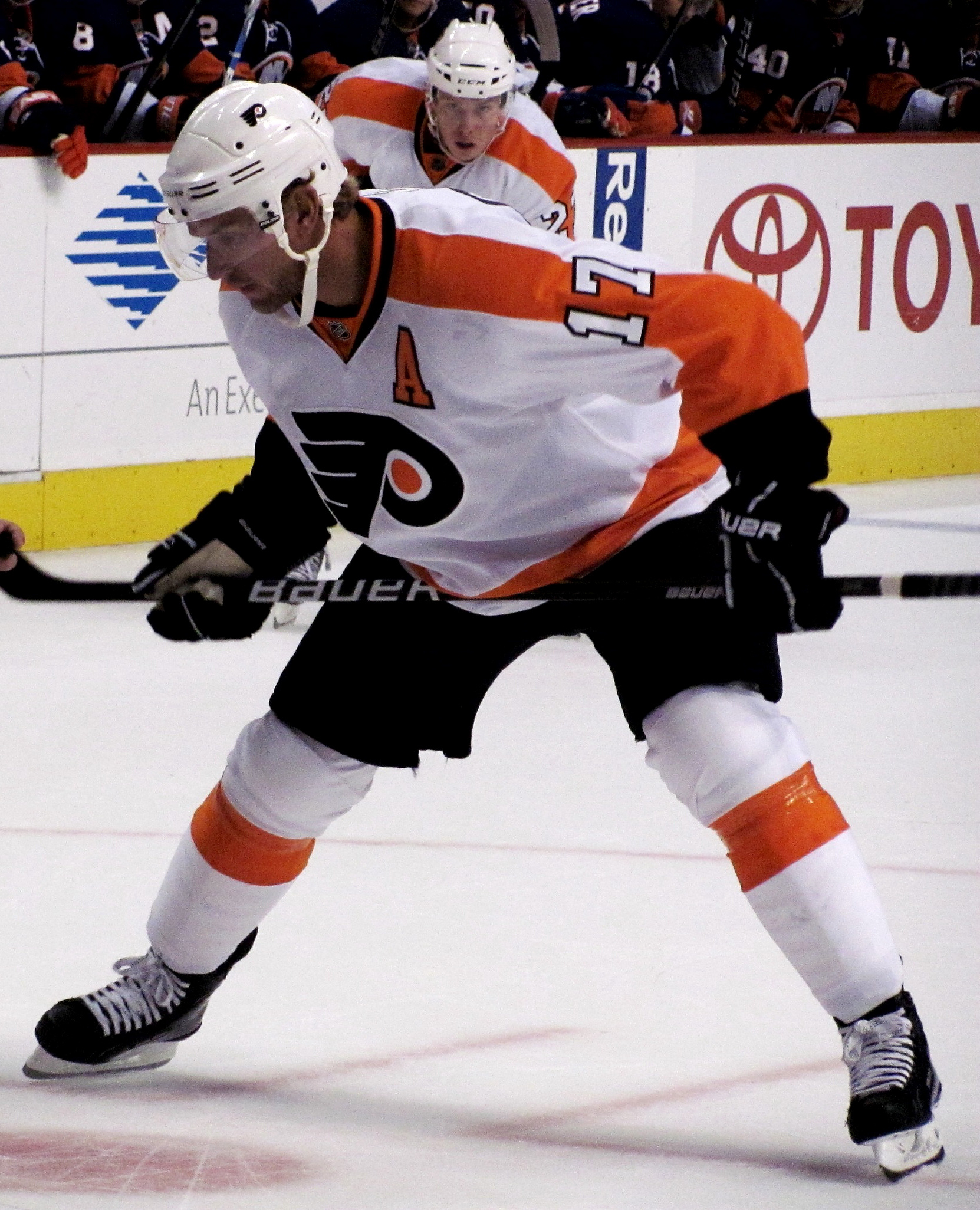
Jeff Carter was selected by Philadelphia in the first round at the 2003 draft and leads all Flyers draft picks in goals (442).

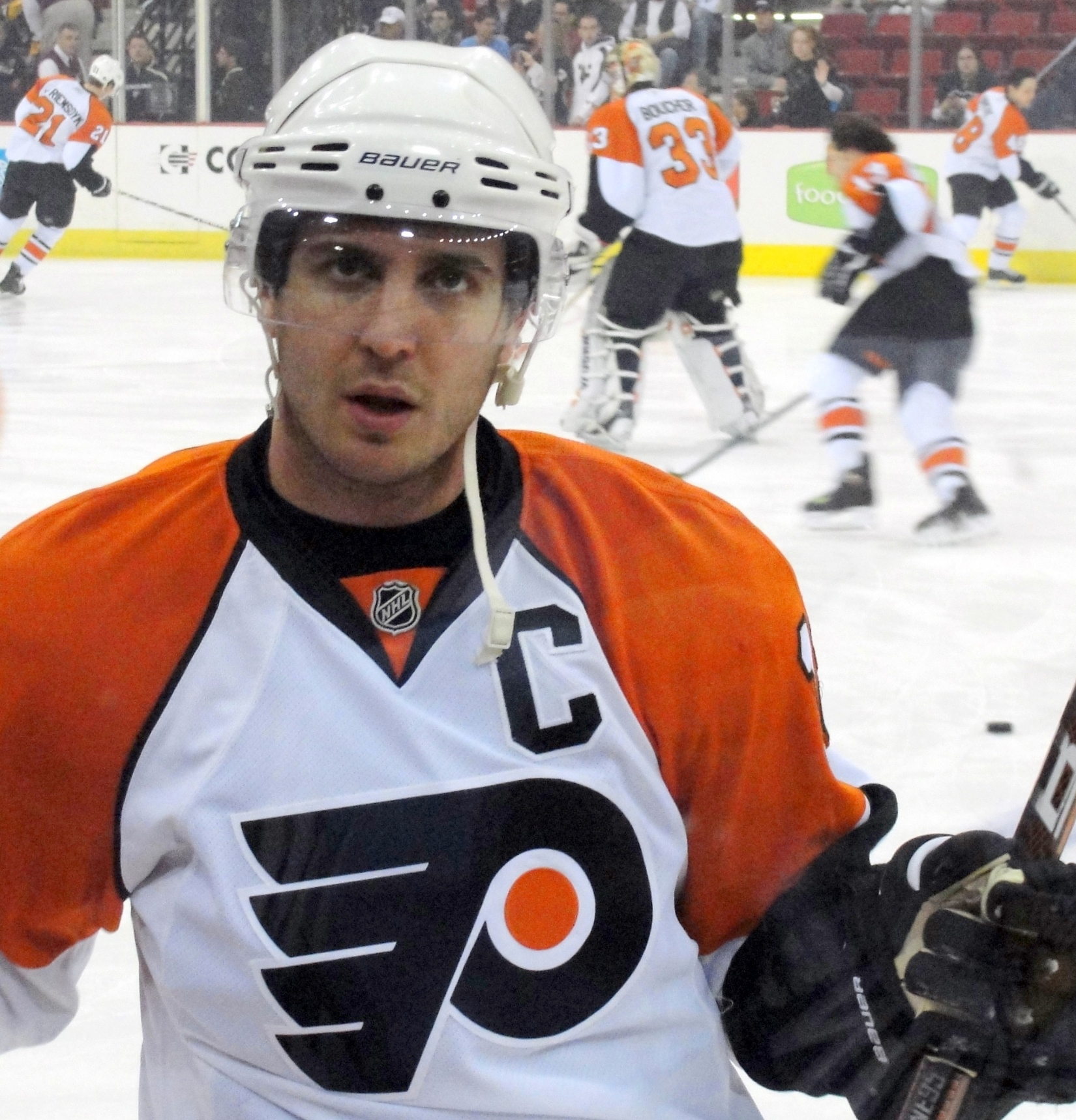
Mike Richards was selected by Philadelphia in the first round at the 2003 draft and served as the Flyers' team captain from 2008 to 2011.

Draft picks who played for the team during the most recently completed season

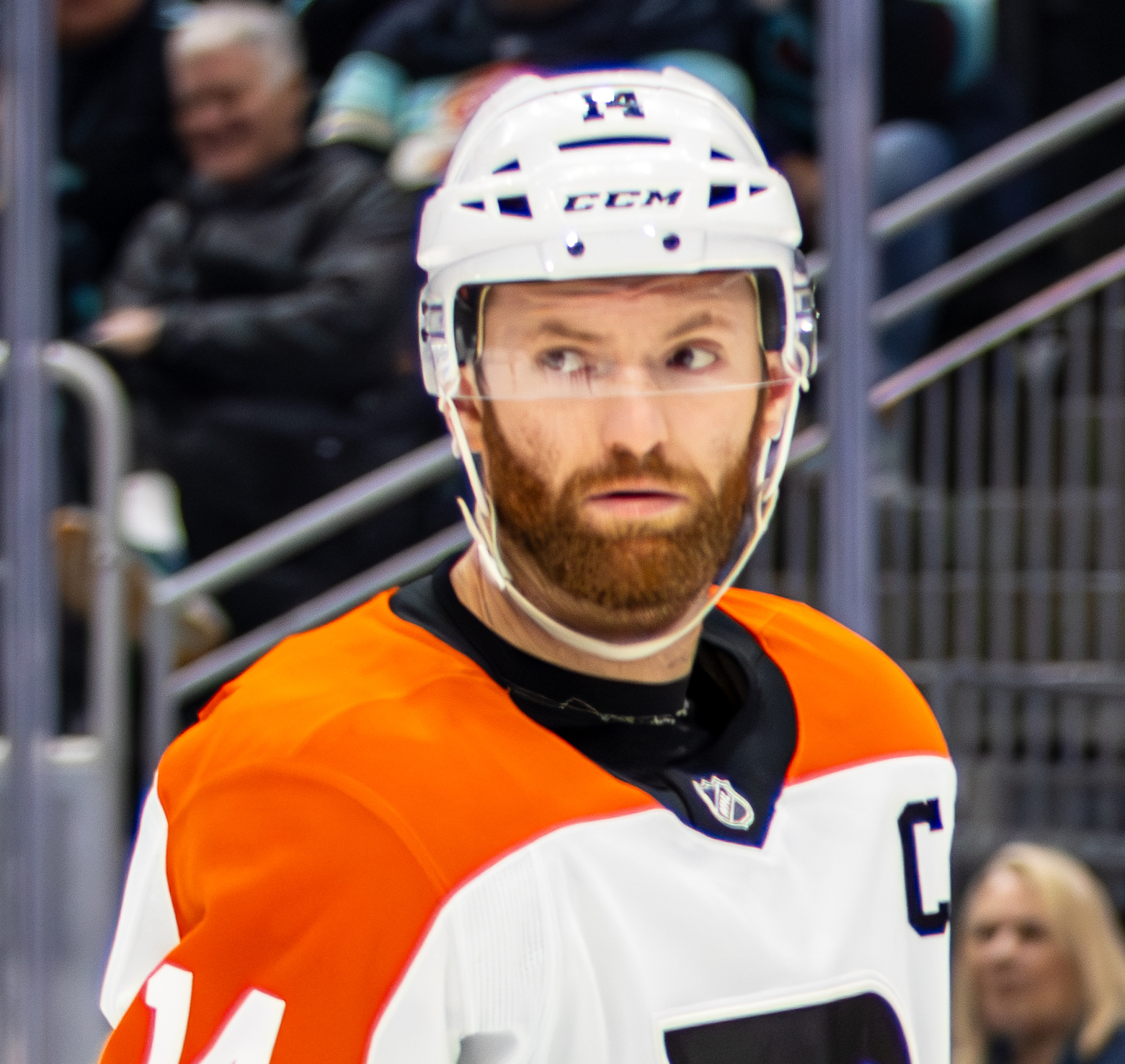
Team captain Sean Couturier was selected by Philadelphia in the first round at the 2011 draft.

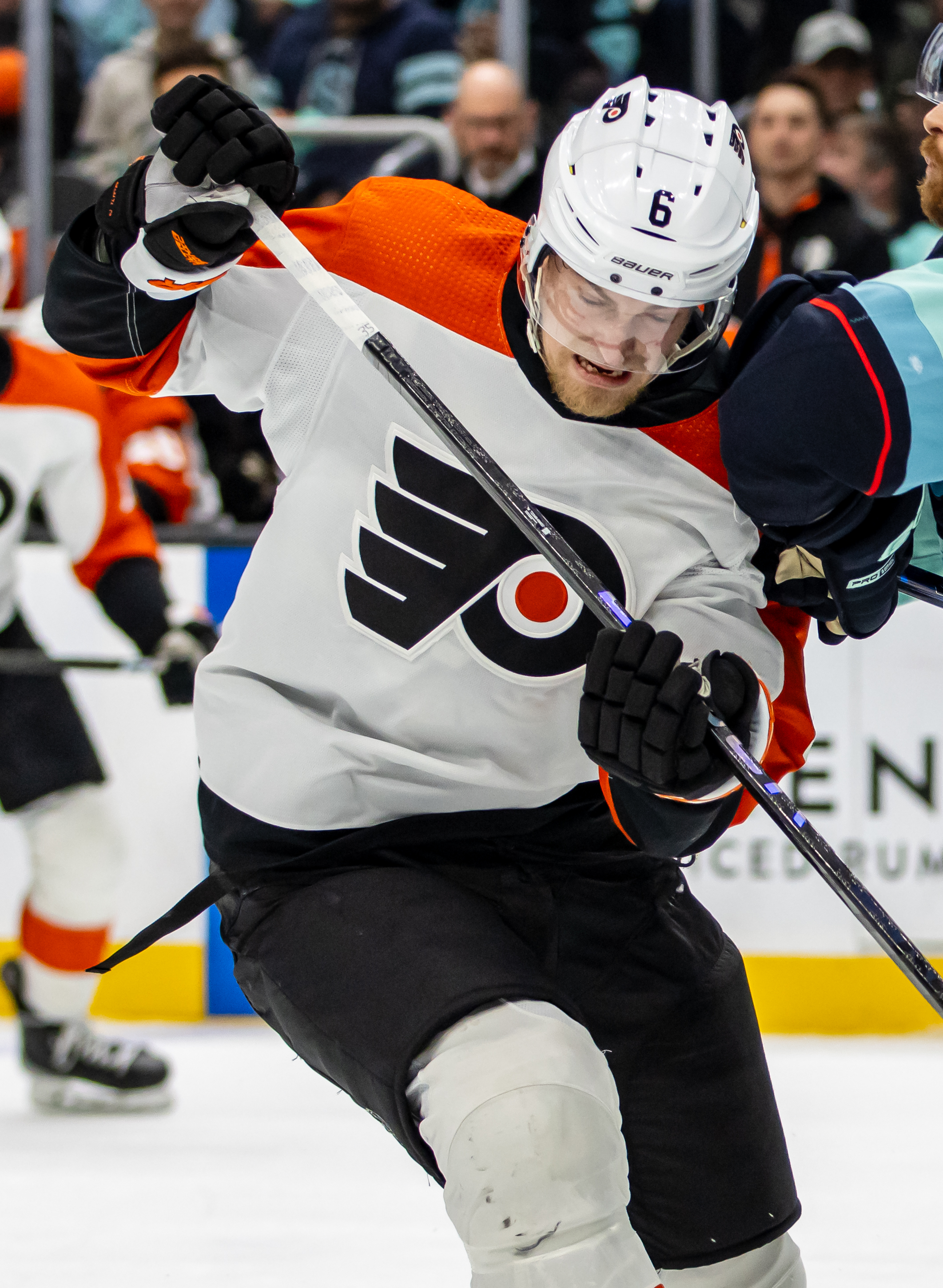
Travis Sanheim was selected by Philadelphia in the first round at the 2014 draft.

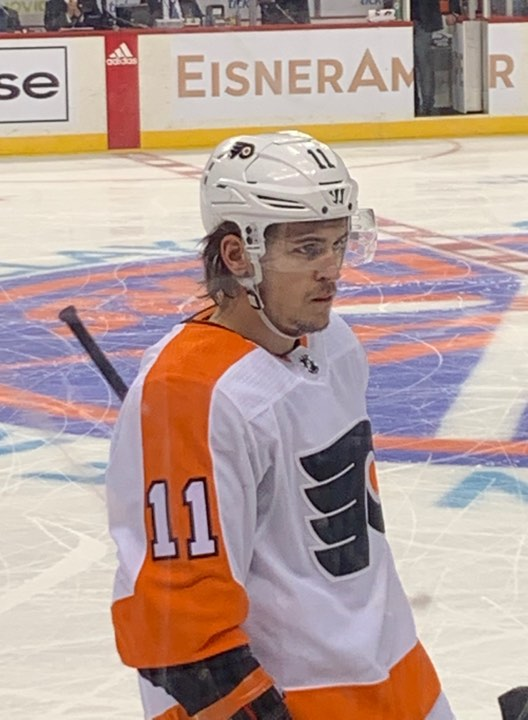
Travis Konecny was selected by Philadelphia in the first round at the 2015 draft.

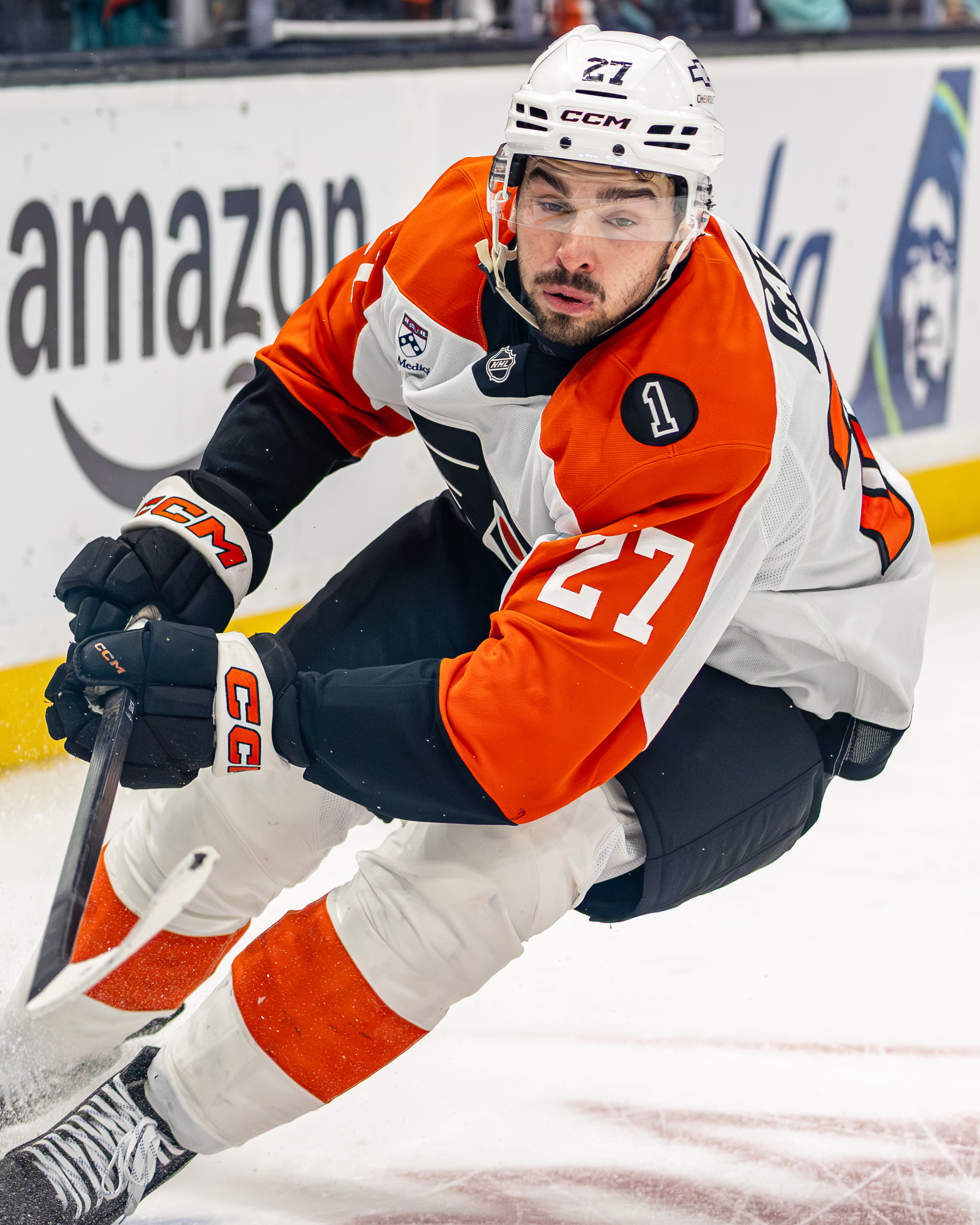
Noah Cates was selected by Philadelphia in the fifth round at the 2017 draft.

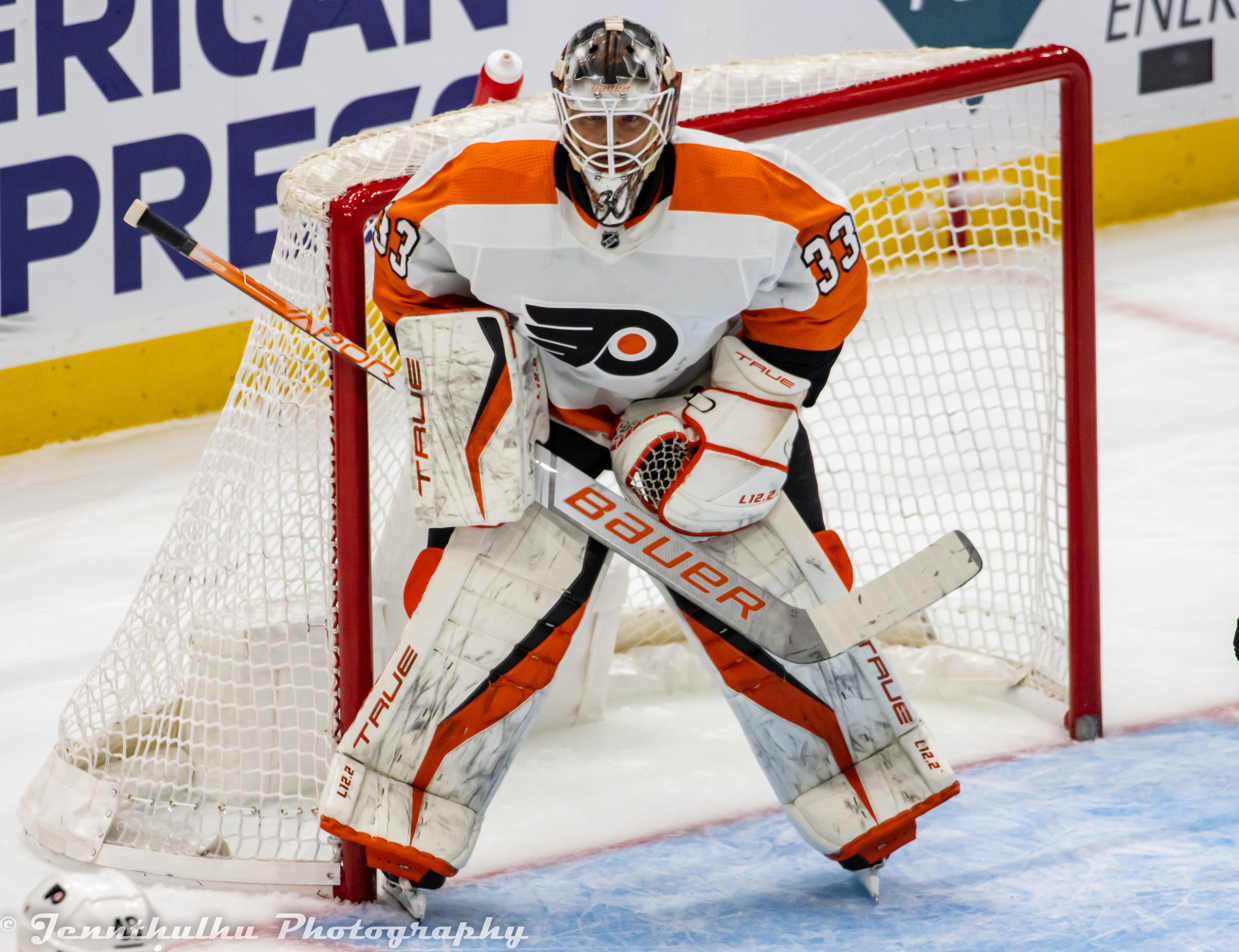
Samuel Ersson was selected by Philadelphia in the fifth round at the 2018 draft.

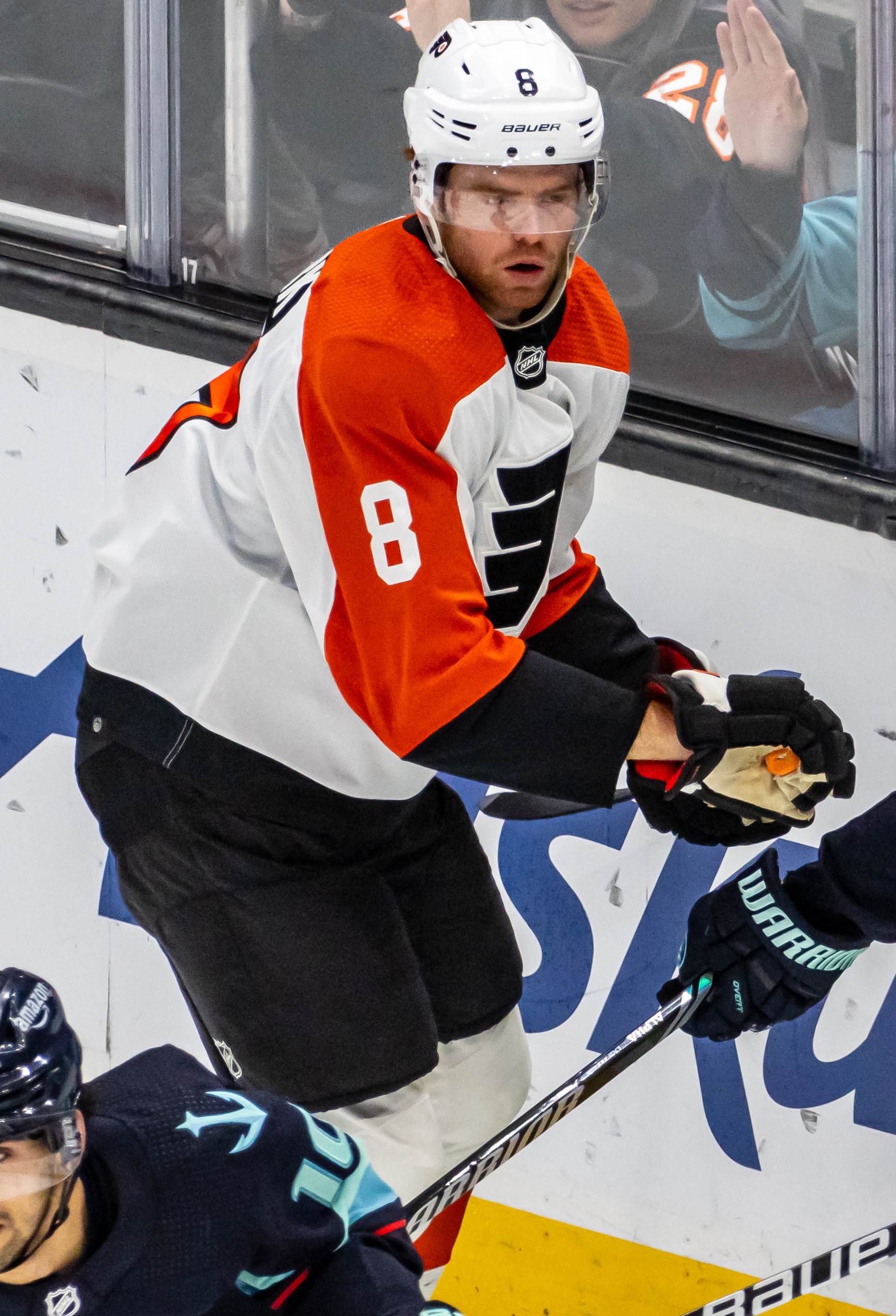
Cam York was selected by Philadelphia in the first round at the 2019 draft.

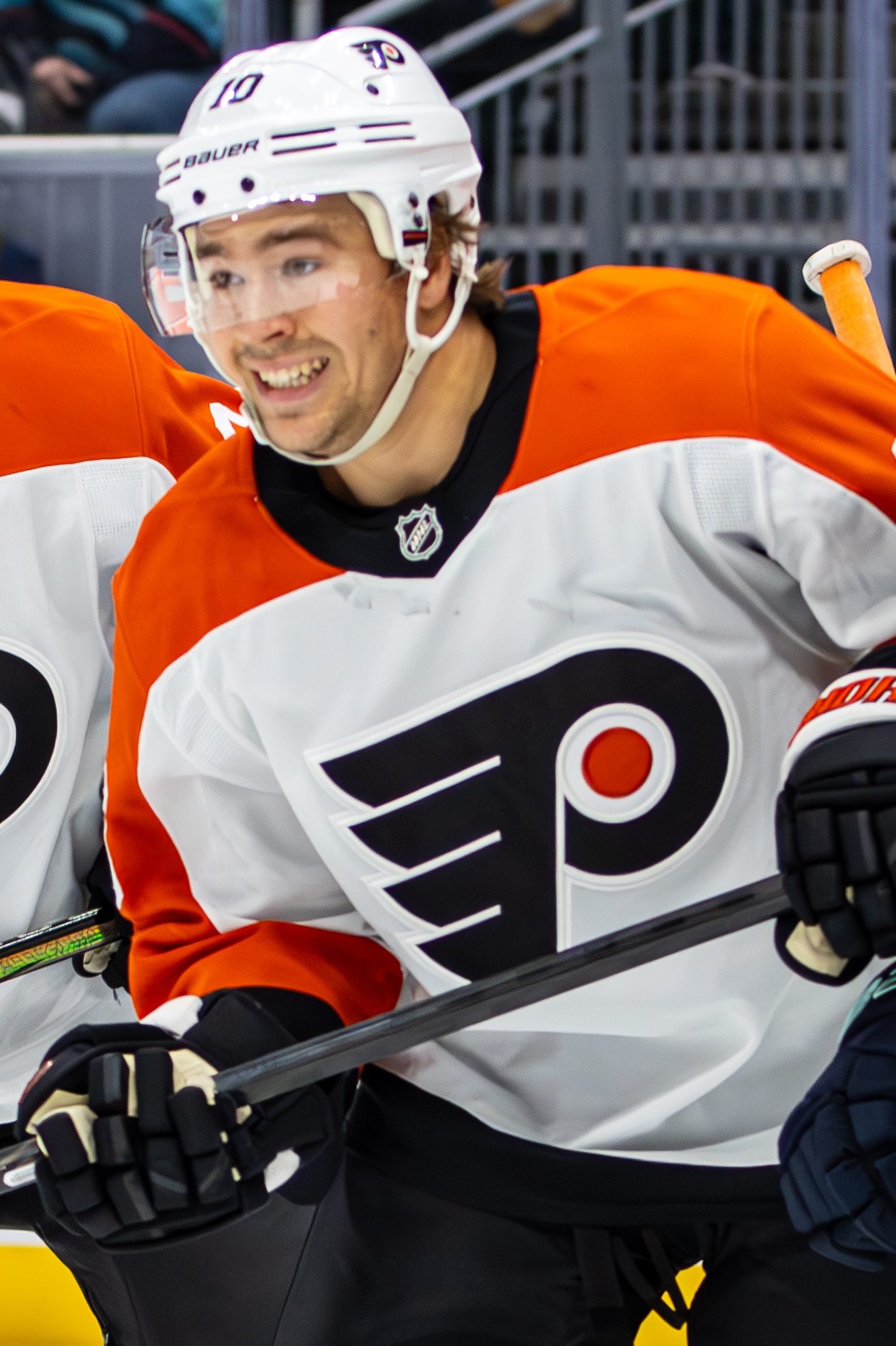
Bobby Brink was selected by Philadelphia in the second round at the 2019 draft.

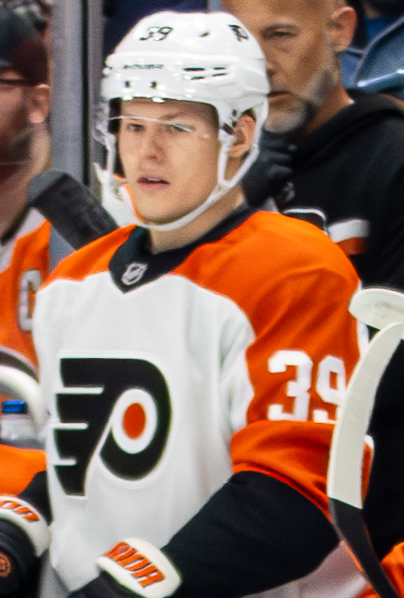
Matvei Michkov was selected by Philadelphia in the first round at the 2023 draft.

== See also ==
- 1967 NHL expansion draft
