= Ty Jones =

American ice hockey player (born 1979)

- Born: February 22, 1979 (age 47) Richland, Washington, U.S.
- Height: 6 ft 3 in (191 cm)
- Weight: 218 lb (99 kg; 15 st 8 lb)
- Position: Right wing
- Shot: Right
- Played for: Chicago Blackhawks; Florida Panthers
- NHL draft: 16th overall, 1997; Chicago Blackhawks
- Playing career: 1998–2004

Tyler Jones (born February 22, 1979) is an American former professional ice hockey winger.

== Playing career ==
He was drafted in the first round of the 1997 NHL entry draft with the 16th overall pick by the Chicago Blackhawks.

After playing four seasons in the Western Hockey League, with the Spokane Chiefs and Kamloops Blazers, he made his NHL debut with the Blackhawks. After appearing as a 19 year old in eight games for the Blackhawks in the 1998–99 season, Jones returned to the Spokane Chiefs (WHL). He made one more appearance on an NHL roster, playing in six games for the Florida Panthers in the 2003–04 season.

He was once considered the top prospect in the Chicago Blackhawks system and comparisons were being made between him and Keith Tkachuk.

== Personal life ==
Jones was born in Richland, Washington, but grew up in Eagle River, Alaska.

== Career statistics ==
=== Regular season and playoffs ===
			Regular season					Playoffs
Season	Team	League	GP	G	A	Pts	PIM	GP	G	A	Pts	PIM
1994–95	Alaska All Stars AAA	AAHL	42	33	35	68	98	—	—	—	—	—
1995–96	Spokane Chiefs	WHL	34	1	0	1	77	3	0	0	0	6
1996–97	Spokane Chiefs	WHL	67	20	34	54	202	9	2	4	6	10
1997–98	Spokane Chiefs	WHL	60	36	48	84	161	18	2	14	16	35
1998–99	Spokane Chiefs	WHL	26	15	12	27	98	—	—	—	—	—
1998–99	Kamloops Blazers	WHL	20	3	16	19	84	14	5	3	8	22
1998–99	Chicago Blackhawks	NHL	8	1	1	2	12	—	—	—	—	—
1999–2000	Cleveland Lumberjacks	IHL	10	1	5	6	34	—	—	—	—	—
1999–2000	Florida Everblades	ECHL	48	11	26	37	81	5	1	1	2	17
2000–01	Norfolk Admirals	AHL	64	11	17	28	114	—	—	—	—	—
2001–02	Norfolk Admirals	AHL	55	6	14	20	172	4	0	0	0	2
2002–03	Anchorage Aces	WCHL	12	1	7	8	49	—	—	—	—	—
2003–04	Norfolk Admirals	AHL	37	4	5	9	93	—	—	—	—	—
2003–04	San Antonio Rampage	AHL	2	0	0	0	2	—	—	—	—	—
2003–04	Florida Panthers	NHL	6	0	0	0	7	—	—	—	—	—
NHL totals			14	1	1	2	19	—	—	—	—	—
AHL totals			158	21	36	57	381	4	0	0	0	2

=== International ===
Year	Team	Event	Result	GP	G	A	Pts	PIM
1998	United States	WJC	5th	7	0	2	2	6
Junior totals				7	0	2	2	6

Awards and achievements
Preceded by Daniel Cleary	Chicago Blackhawks first-round draft pick 1997	Succeeded by Mark Bell
