= Mikhail Chernov =

Mikhail Chernov may refer to:

- Mikhail Chernov (economist)
- Mikhail Chernov (ice hockey)
- Mikhail Chernov (politician)
