= Maksim Sokolovskii =

- Born: July 12, 2008 (age 18) Petropavl, Kazakhstan
- Height: 6 ft 7 in (201 cm)
- Weight: 238 lb (108 kg; 17 st 0 lb)
- Position: Defence
- Shoots: Left
- OHL team: London Knights
- NHL draft: 27th overall, 2026; Philadelphia Flyers

Maksim Sokolovskii (Russian: Максим Соколовский; born 12 July 2008) is a Kazakhstani-Russian ice hockey defenceman for the London Knights of the Ontario Hockey League (OHL). He was selected by the Philadelphia Flyers in the first round (27th overall) of the 2026 NHL entry draft.

== Playing career ==
Sokolovskii was born in Kazakhstan but played during his early hockey career at the Yunost program in Yekaterinburg, Russia, where he competed four seasons. He played for Yunost Yekaterinburg at the U16 and U17 level in 2023–24, scoring 15 points in 24 games for the U16 team while having a plus–minus rating of +32, and posting 7 points in 27 games for the U17 team while having a plus-15 rating. After the season, Sokolovskii moved overseas, as he thought playing in North America would lead to him receiving more attention as an NHL prospect. He joined the Atlantic Coast Academy 16U AAA program, scoring 34 goals and 50 assists for 84 points in 65 games, being Atlantic Coast's second-leading scorer for the 2024–25 season.

Sokolovskii was selected in the second round (119th overall) of the 2025 CHL Import Draft and signed with the London Knights of the Ontario Hockey League (OHL) on 21 August 2025. He saw limited playing time at the start of his first year with the Knights but improved as the season went on. Sokolovskii appeared in 44 games, recording two goals and six assists while having a plus-10 rating.

Sokolovskii was selected by the Philadelphia Flyers in the first round, 27th overall, of the 2026 NHL entry draft.

== Personal life ==
Sokolovskii was born on 12 July 2008, in Petropavl, Kazakhstan. He is nicknamed "The Terminator".

Awards and achievements
Preceded by Jack Nesbitt	Philadelphia Flyers first-round draft pick 2026	Succeeded by Incumbent
