= Mike Stothers =

Canadian ice hockey player & coach

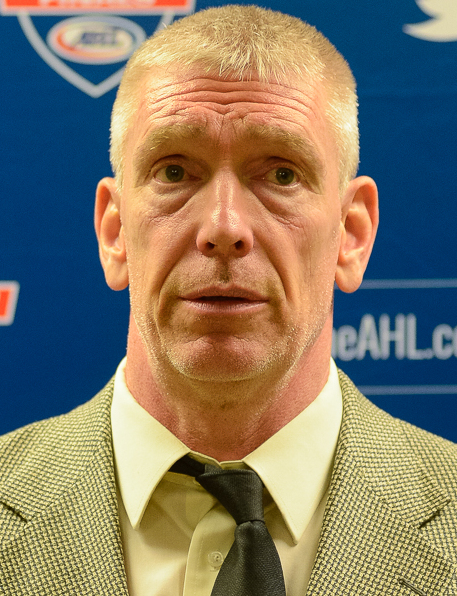
- Stothers in 2015
- Born: February 22, 1962 (age 64) Toronto, Ontario, Canada
- Height: 6 ft 4 in (193 cm)
- Weight: 212 lb (96 kg; 15 st 2 lb)
- Position: Defence
- Shot: Left
- Played for: Philadelphia Flyers; Toronto Maple Leafs
- NHL draft: 21st overall, 1980; Philadelphia Flyers
- Playing career: 1981–1992

Michael Patrick Stothers (born February 22, 1962) is a Canadian former professional ice hockey player who is an assistant coach for the Pittsburgh Penguins of the National Hockey League (NHL). He played for the Philadelphia Flyers and Toronto Maple Leafs, and was previously the head coach of the Grand Rapids Griffins of the AHL, the Owen Sound Attack of the OHL, the Moose Jaw Warriors of the Western Hockey League (WHL), and the Ontario Reign of the American Hockey League (AHL).

== Playing career ==
As a youth, Stothers played in the 1975 Quebec International Pee-Wee Hockey Tournament with the Toronto Shopsy's minor ice hockey team.

Mike Stothers played junior hockey with the Kingston Canadians of the OMJHL from 1979 to 1982, appearing in 183 games, registering 74 points (9 goals-65 assists), and in 21 playoff games with Kingston, Stothers had 6 points (1G-5A). The Philadelphia Flyers drafted Stothers with their 1st round draft pick, 21st overall in the 1980 NHL entry draft.

After Kingston was eliminated from the 1982 OHL playoffs, Stothers joined the Maine Mariners of the AHL for the rest of the 1981–82 season, going pointless in 5 regular season games and in 1 playoff game. Stothers played the entire 1982–83 season with Maine, playing in all 80 games while scoring 18 points (2G-16). He then went pointless in 12 playoff games. Stothers once again spent an entire season with the Mariners in 1983–84, getting 12 points (2G-10A) in 61 games, and then in 17 playoff games, he recorded an assist. The Flyers moved their AHL affiliate to Hershey in 1984–85, and Stothers moved along with them, and had the best season of his career, setting a career high with 26 points (8G-18A) with the Hershey Bears in 60 games. He also made his NHL debut with the Flyers, getting no points in his only game of the season in Philadelphia.

Stothers returned to Hershey in 1985–86, getting 13 points (4G-9A) in 66 games, and 3 points (0G-3A) in 13 playoff games. He also played in 6 games with the Flyers, getting an assist, and played in 3 playoff games with Philadelphia, getting no points. In 1986–87, Stothers was in Hershey again, getting a career high 283 penalty minutes, and had 16 points (5G-11A) in 75 games. He had no points in 5 playoff games with the Bears. He also once again appeared in some games with Philadelphia, getting no points in 2 regular season games, and no points in 2 playoff games with the Flyers.

Stothers started the 1987–88 season splitting time between Hershey, where in 13 games he had 5 points (3G-2A), and in 3 games with the Flyers, he was held pointless. On December 4, 1987, the Flyers sent Stothers to the Toronto Maple Leafs for future considerations. He spent the rest of the season spending time with both the Maple Leafs, getting an assist in 18 games, and the Newmarket Saints of the AHL, with 10 points (1G-9A) in 38 games.

On June 21, 1988, the Maple Leafs sent Stothers back to the Philadelphia Flyers for Bill Root, however he would spend the last 4 years of his playing career with the Hershey Bears of the AHL. In 1988–89, Stothers would get 15 points (4G-11A) in 76 games, along with 262 PIM, and he would earn 2 assists in 9 playoff games. In 1989–90, Stothers would see his production slip to 7 points (1G-6A) in 56 games as the Bears failed to make the playoffs. In 1990–91, Stothers would get 11 points (5G-6A) in 72 games, and chipped in with an assist in 7 playoff games. The 1991–92 season was the final one of Stothers playing career, and he ended it as a player-assistant coach with the Bears, getting 11 points (3G-8A) in 70 games, and had an assist in 6 playoff games. Stothers retired as a hockey player in the summer of 1992 and decided to get into coaching.

== Career statistics ==
			Regular season					Playoffs
Season	Team	League	GP	G	A	Pts	PIM	GP	G	A	Pts	PIM
1978–79	St. Michael's Buzzers	MetJHL	40	15	35	50		—	—	—	—	—
1979–80	Kingston Canadians	OMJHL	66	4	23	27	137	3	1	1	2	26
1980–81	Kingston Canadians	OHL	65	4	22	26	237	14	0	3	3	27
1981–82	Kingston Canadians	OHL	61	1	20	21	203	4	0	1	1	8
1981–82	Maine Mariners	AHL	5	0	0	0	4	1	0	0	0	0
1982–83	Maine Mariners	AHL	80	2	16	18	139	12	0	0	0	21
1983–84	Maine Mariners	AHL	61	2	10	12	109	17	0	1	1	34
1984–85	Philadelphia Flyers	NHL	1	0	0	0	0	—	—	—	—	—
1984–85	Hershey Bears	AHL	59	8	18	26	142	—	—	—	—	—
1985–86	Philadelphia Flyers	NHL	6	0	1	1	6	3	0	0	0	4
1985–86	Hershey Bears	AHL	66	4	9	13	221	13	0	3	3	88
1986–87	Philadelphia Flyers	NHL	2	0	0	0	4	2	0	0	0	7
1986–87	Hershey Bears	AHL	75	5	11	16	283	5	0	0	0	10
1987–88	Philadelphia Flyers	NHL	3	0	0	0	13	—	—	—	—	—
1987–88	Hershey Bears	AHL	13	3	2	5	55	—	—	—	—	—
1987–88	Toronto Maple Leafs	NHL	18	0	1	1	42	—	—	—	—	—
1987–88	Newmarket Saints	AHL	38	1	9	10	69	—	—	—	—	—
1988–89	Hershey Bears	AHL	76	4	11	15	262	9	0	2	2	29
1989–90	Hershey Bears	AHL	51	1	6	7	170	—	—	—	—	—
1990–91	Hershey Bears	AHL	72	5	6	11	234	7	0	1	1	9
1991–92	Hershey Bears	AHL	70	3	8	11	152	6	0	1	1	6
AHL totals			671	38	106	144	1840	70	0	8	8	197
NHL totals			30	0	2	2	65	5	0	0	0	11

== Coaching career ==
Mike Stothers was an assistant coach with the Hershey Bears, the Philadelphia Flyers AHL affiliate, from 1992 to 1996. When the Flyers relocated their AHL team to Philadelphia and became the Philadelphia Phantoms, Stothers went along with them, and was an assistant coach from 1996 to 2000. He also spent some time with the Flyers as an interim assistant coach in the 1998–1999 season, and once again in the 1999–2000 season before getting the job permanently on June 13, 2000. Stothers stayed with the Flyers through the 2001–02 season. On July 17, 2002, Stothers would leave the Flyers organization to take the head coaching job of the Owen Sound Attack of the OHL.

In his first season with Owen Sound in 2002–03, he guided the Attack to a 27–30–7–4 record for 65 points, an improvement of 4 points the team had the previous season, however his team was swept in the 1st round of the playoffs to the Plymouth Whalers. The Attack improved to a record of 30–27–7–4, 71 points, which was good for 6th place in the Western Conference. The Attack would then go on to lose in a hard-fought 7-game series against the Guelph Storm, who went on to win the league championship that season. The Attack improved more in 2004–05, to a record of 40–18–7–3, 90 points, which is a franchise record. Owen Sound then won their first playoff round since 1999, sweeping Plymouth, before getting swept themselves by the Kitchener Rangers in the 2nd round. The Attack went into a rebuilding stage in 2005–06, however they played much better than people predicted, finishing with a 32–29–7, 71-point season. They had a rematch against the heavily favoured Kitchener Rangers, and took them out in 5 games in the opening round. The Attack then gave the London Knights a scare in the 2nd round before falling to them in 6 games.

On July 18, 2007, Stothers was named as the next head coach of the Grand Rapids Griffins, according to the Grand Rapids Press . He succeeded Greg Ireland, who had been head coach of the Griffins from 2004–05 to 2006–07. His coaching career in Grand Rapids was limited to only one season, as he was relieved of his coaching duties when the Griffins reacquired coaching responsibilities from the Detroit Red Wings on June 18, 2008.

In July 2014, Stothers was named the new head coach for the Manchester Monarchs, an affiliate team of the L.A. Kings. In June 2015, Mike led the team to the Calder Cup Championship. Stothers then moved with the franchise to Ontario, California in 2015, and he remained with the team until his contract was not renewed in May 2020.

He joined the Anaheim Ducks as an assistant to head coach Dallas Eakins on June 15, 2021.

== Coaching record ==
Team	Year	Regular Season							Post Season
Team	Year	G	W	L	T	OTL	Pts	Finish	Result
Owen Sound	2002–03	68	27	30	7	4	65	4th in Midwest	Lost in first round
Owen Sound	2003–04	68	30	27	7	4	71	4th in Midwest	Lost in first round
Owen Sound	2004–05	68	40	18	7	3	90	2nd in Midwest	Lost in second round
Owen Sound	2005–06	68	32	29	-	7	71	4th in Midwest	Lost in second round
Grand Rapids	2007–08	80	31	41	-	8	70	5th in North	Missed playoffs
Moose Jaw	2011–12	72	45	19	-	8	98	1st in East	Lost in conference finals
Moose Jaw	2012–13	72	25	36	-	11	61	4th in East	Missed playoffs
Moose Jaw	2013–14	72	21	42	-	9	51	5th in East	Missed playoffs
Manchester	2014–15	76	50	17	-	9	109	1st in Atlantic	Calder Cup champions

Preceded by Brian Propp	Philadelphia Flyers' first-round draft pick 1980	Succeeded by Steve Smith
