= Jack Nesbitt =

- Born: January 12, 2007 (age 19) Sarnia, Ontario, Canada
- Height: 6 ft 4 in (193 cm)
- Weight: 185 lb (84 kg; 13 st 3 lb)
- Position: Centre
- Shoots: Left
- OHL team: Windsor Spitfires
- NHL draft: 12th overall, 2025; Philadelphia Flyers

Jack Nesbitt (born January 12, 2007) is a Canadian junior ice hockey centre for the University of Michigan of the National Collegiate Athletic Association (NCAA). He previously played for the Windsor Spitfires of the Ontario Hockey League. He was drafted 12th overall by the Philadelphia Flyers in the 2025 NHL entry draft.

== Playing career ==
Nesbitt was scouted as a second or third-round player in 2024, but in his second season with Windsor, he scored 25 goals and 64 points in 65 games, prompting the Flyers to move up in the draft order to select him at number 12.

Nesbitt has represented Canada at the 2025 IIHF World U18 Championships, winning gold and scoring two goals, including one in the gold medal game. He is a member of the Wiikwemkoong First Nation.

On May 21, 2026 Nesbitt committed to play college ice hockey at Michigan during the 2026–27 season.

== Career statistics ==
			Regular season					Playoffs
Season	Team	League	GP	G	A	Pts	PIM	GP	G	A	Pts	PIM
2023–24	Windsor Spitfires	OHL	58	9	9	18	58	—	—	—	—	—
2024–25	Windsor Spitfires	OHL	65	25	39	64	74	12	1	9	10	30
2025–26	Windsor Spitfires	OHL	55	25	33	58	67	13	7	3	10	17
OHL totals			178	59	81	140	199	25	8	12	20	47

Awards and achievements
Preceded by Porter Martone	Philadelphia Flyers first-round draft pick 2025	Succeeded by Maksim Sokolovskii
