= Dmitri Tertyshny =

Russian ice hockey player (1976-1999)

- Born: December 26, 1976 Chelyabinsk, Soviet Union
- Died: July 23, 1999 (aged 22) Okanagan Lake, British Columbia, Canada
- Height: 6 ft 2 in (188 cm)
- Weight: 180 lb (82 kg; 12 st 12 lb)
- Position: Defence
- Shot: Left
- Played for: Traktor Chelyabinsk; Philadelphia Flyers
- NHL draft: 132nd overall, 1995; Philadelphia Flyers
- Playing career: 1994–1999

Dmitri Valerievich Tertyshny (Russian: Дмитрий Валерьевич Тертышный; December 26, 1976 – July 23, 1999) was a Russian professional ice hockey defenceman. He played one season, 1998–99, in the National Hockey League (NHL) for the Philadelphia Flyers and four seasons in the Russian Superleague for Traktor Chelyabinsk from 1994 to 1998. He died in 1999 during a boating accident.

== Playing career ==
After spending a year with Traktor Chelyabinsk of the CIS/Russian League, Tertyshny was selected in the sixth round by the Philadelphia Flyers with the 132nd overall draft pick in the 1995 NHL entry draft. He spent three more seasons with Chelyabinsk before joining the Flyers in the 1998–99 season.

== Fatal accident ==
On July 23, 1999, during the offseason after his rookie NHL campaign, Tertyshny was on a boating trip to Okanagan Lake in British Columbia with two players from the Flyers' minor-league affiliate Philadelphia Phantoms, Francis Belanger and Mikhail Chernov, when he suffered fatal injuries in a freak accident. Tertyshny fell forward out of the boat after it hit a wave, the boat ran over him, and its propeller slashed his neck and his jugular vein.

== Career statistics ==
=== Regular season and playoffs ===
			Regular season					Playoffs
Season	Team	League	GP	G	A	Pts	PIM	GP	G	A	Pts	PIM
1993–94	Taganay Zlatoust	RUS-3	45	1	2	3	26	—	—	—	—	—
1994–95	UralAZ Miass	RUS-2	22	3	2	5	26	—	—	—	—	—
1994–95	Traktor Chelyabinsk	IHL	38	0	3	3	14	1	0	0	0	0
1995–96	Traktor Chelyabinsk	IHL	44	1	5	6	50	—	—	—	—	—
1995–96	Nadezhda Chelyabinsk	RUS-2	6	0	0	0	2	—	—	—	—	—
1996–97	Traktor Chelyabinsk	RSL	40	2	5	7	32	2	0	0	0	2
1997–98	Traktor Chelyabinsk	RSL	45	3	7	10	16	2	0	2	2	2
1998–99	Philadelphia Flyers	NHL	62	2	8	10	30	1	0	0	0	2
IHL/RSL totals			167	6	20	26	112	5	0	2	2	4
NHL totals			62	2	8	10	30	1	0	0	0	2

== See also ==
- List of ice hockey players who died during their playing career
