= Steve Smith (ice hockey, born April 4, 1963) =

Canadian ice hockey player (born 1963)

- Born: April 4, 1963 (age 63) Trenton, Ontario, Canada
- Height: 5 ft 9 in (175 cm)
- Weight: 195 lb (88 kg; 13 st 13 lb)
- Position: Defence
- Shot: Left
- Played for: Philadelphia Flyers; Buffalo Sabres
- NHL draft: 16th overall, 1981; Philadelphia Flyers
- Playing career: 1981–1993

Steven Smith (born April 4, 1963) is a Canadian former professional ice hockey defenceman who played for the Philadelphia Flyers and Buffalo Sabres in 17 National Hockey League (NHL) games.

== Career ==
Smith was drafted 16th overall in the first round of 1981 NHL entry draft by the Philadelphia Flyers, from the Sault Ste. Marie Greyhounds. He played his first eight NHL games in November 1981. Despite being drafted in the first round and being regarded as a highly-rated prospect, Smith spent most of his professional career in the minors. After winning the Calder Cup as a member of the Hershey Bears in 1987–88, Smith left the Flyers organization in the off-season and signed with the Calgary Flames on July 14. Before playing any games with his new team, he was claimed by the Buffalo Sabres in the 1988 NHL Waiver Draft and saw his last NHL action early in the 1988–89 season.

== Career statistics ==
			Regular season					Playoffs
Season	Team	League	GP	G	A	Pts	PIM	GP	G	A	Pts	PIM
1979–80	Belleville Bobcats	OPJHL	42	8	25	33	105	—	—	—	—	—
1979–80	Peterborough Petes	OMJHL	5	0	3	3	0	—	—	—	—	—
1980–81	Sault Ste. Marie Greyhounds	OHL	61	3	37	40	143	19	0	6	6	60
1981–82	Philadelphia Flyers	NHL	8	0	1	1	0	—	—	—	—	—
1981–82	Sault Ste. Marie Greyhounds	OHL	50	7	20	27	179	12	0	2	2	23
1982–83	Sault Ste. Marie Greyhounds	OHL	55	11	33	44	139	16	0	8	8	28
1983–84	Springfield Indians	AHL	70	4	25	29	77	4	0	0	0	0
1984–85	Philadelphia Flyers	NHL	2	0	0	0	7	—	—	—	—	—
1984–85	Springfield Indians	AHL	5	0	1	1	2	—	—	—	—	—
1984–85	Hershey Bears	AHL	65	10	20	30	83	—	—	—	—	—
1985–86	Philadelphia Flyers	NHL	2	0	0	0	2	—	—	—	—	—
1985–86	Hershey Bears	AHL	49	1	11	12	96	16	2	4	6	43
1986–87	Philadelphia Flyers	NHL	2	0	0	0	6	—	—	—	—	—
1986–87	Hershey Bears	AHL	66	11	26	37	191	5	0	2	2	8
1987–88	Hershey Bears	AHL	66	10	19	29	132	12	2	10	12	35
1988–89	Buffalo Sabres	NHL	3	0	0	0	0	—	—	—	—	—
1988–89	Rochester Americans	AHL	48	2	12	14	79	—	—	—	—	—
1989–90	Rochester Americans	AHL	42	3	15	18	107	17	0	5	5	27
1990–91	Rochester Americans	AHL	37	2	4	6	74	5	0	0	0	4
1991–92	Rochester Americans	AHL	3	1	0	1	0	—	—	—	—	—
1991–92	EK Zell am See	AUT	28	11	6	17	—	—	—	—	—	—
1992–93	EV MAK Bruneck	ITA	16	6	21	27	4	4	10	6	16	0
1992–93	EV MAK Bruneck	AL	30	12	24	36	20	—	—	—	—	—
NHL totals			17	0	1	1	15	—	—	—	—	—
AHL totals			451	44	133	177	841	59	4	21	25	117

Preceded by Mike Stothers	Philadelphia Flyers' first-round draft pick 1981	Succeeded by Ron Sutter
