= Francis Bélanger =

Canadian ice hockey player

- Born: January 15, 1978 (age 48) Bellefeuille, Quebec, Canada
- Height: 6 ft 2 in (188 cm)
- Weight: 227 lb (103 kg; 16 st 3 lb)
- Position: Left wing
- Shot: Left
- Played for: Montreal Canadiens
- NHL draft: 124th overall, 1998; Philadelphia Flyers
- Playing career: 1998–2013

Francis Henri Bélanger (born January 15, 1978) is a retired Canadian professional ice hockey player who appeared in 10 National Hockey League (NHL) games for the Montreal Canadiens during the 2000–01 season.

== Career ==
On July 23, 1999, while enjoying what was supposed to be a leisurely boating trip in British Columbia alongside fellow Philadelphia Flyers prospects Dmitri Tertyshny and Mikhail Chernov, Bélanger witnessed a harrowing tragedy. As the boat hit a wave, Tertyshny was thrown forward over the bow, and in a devastating accident, the boat's propeller fatally struck him, severing his jugular vein. The sudden and violent nature of the incident left Bélanger deeply traumatized. Struggling to cope with the loss of his close friend and teammate, he fell into a spiral of depression and began drinking heavily as a way to numb the emotional pain. Recognizing his deteriorating mental health, the Flyers organization stepped in with support: they granted him leave with full pay, encouraged him to pursue professional help, and had their strength and conditioning coach provide him with a structured daily workout plan in hopes of giving him a sense of stability and purpose. Despite these efforts, Bélanger's struggles persisted, and on November 29, 2000, he failed a drug test, which led to his release from the organization. Determined to reclaim his career and rebuild his life, Bélanger entered a rehabilitation program to work toward sobriety. His efforts began to pay off when, on January 13, 2001, he earned a seven-game tryout with the Quebec Citadelles of the AHL. Making the most of this opportunity, he scored a hat trick in a 5–2 victory over the Portland Pirates and accumulated 10 goals and 11 points in just 14 games. His impressive performance caught the attention of the Montreal Canadiens, who offered him a two-year contract worth $300,000. Bélanger's perseverance culminated in a call-up to the NHL on February 15, 2001, and he officially made his NHL debut two days later in a game against the Washington Capitals.

== Career statistics ==
=== Regular season and playoffs ===
			Regular season					Playoffs
Season	Team	League	GP	G	A	Pts	PIM	GP	G	A	Pts	PIM
1994–95	Abitibi-Témiscamingue Forestiers	QMAAA	4	1	0	1	—	—	—	—	—	—
1994–95	Laval Régents	QMAAA	28	11	8	19	78	14	0	8	8	—
1995–96	Hull Olympiques	QMJHL	1	0	0	0	0	—	—	—	—	—
1995–96	St-Jérôme Panthers	QPJHL	26	3	7	10	179	—	—	—	—	—
1996–97	Hull Olympiques	QMJHL	53	13	13	26	134	8	2	2	4	29
1997–98	Hull Olympiques	QMJHL	33	22	23	45	133	—	—	—	—	—
1997–98	Rimouski Océanic	QMJHL	30	18	10	28	248	17	14	8	22	61
1998–99	Philadelphia Phantoms	AHL	58	13	13	26	242	16	4	3	7	16
1999–00	Trenton Titans	ECHL	9	1	1	2	29	—	—	—	—	—
1999–00	Philadelphia Phantoms	AHL	35	5	6	11	112	—	—	—	—	—
2000–01	Montreal Canadiens	NHL	10	0	0	0	29	—	—	—	—	—
2000–01	Philadelphia Phantoms	AHL	13	1	3	4	32	—	—	—	—	—
2000–01	Quebec Citadelles	AHL	22	15	4	19	101	9	2	5	7	20
2001–02	Quebec Citadelles	AHL	69	15	26	41	165	3	1	1	2	0
2002–03	Cincinnati Mighty Ducks	AHL	40	4	10	14	50	—	—	—	—	—
2003–04	Charlotte Checkers	ECHL	5	2	1	3	25	—	—	—	—	—
2003–04	Richmond RiverDogs	UHL	17	11	13	24	47	4	1	1	2	32
2003–04	Granby Prédateurs	QSMHL	42	17	16	33	179	—	—	—	—	—
2004–05	Richmond RiverDogs	UHL	63	26	26	52	174	—	—	—	—	—
2004–05	Danbury Trashers	UHL	13	1	8	9	35	11	3	7	10	23
2005–06	Danbury Trashers	UHL	4	2	3	5	37	—	—	—	—	—
2005–06	Sorel-Tracy Mission	LNAH	38	24	22	46	145	11	6	4	10	16
2006–07	Sorel-Tracy Mission	LNAH	40	21	19	40	118	10	2	3	5	28
2007–08	Sorel-Tracy Mission	LNAH	1	1	0	1	2	—	—	—	—	—
2007–08	Rivière-du-Loup CIMT	QSCHL	27	22	19	41	99	10	5	7	12	41
2010–11	Sorel-Tracy GCI	LNAH	32	12	11	23	95	—	—	—	—	—
2012–13	Sorel-Tracy Carvena HC	LNAH	15	2	3	5	44	—	—	—	—	—
NHL totals			10	0	0	0	29	—	—	—	—	—
