= High school boys ice hockey in North Dakota =

The North Dakota High School Boys Hockey program is a high school ice hockey program in the State of North Dakota. The first boys hockey competition took place in 1966-1967 and was won by Grand Forks Central High School.

== History ==
The North Dakota High School Activities Association (NDHSAA) began fully sponsoring boys hockey in the 1966-67 season after a trial period that lasted one year (1965–66). The 1967 state tournament at Grand Forks was the sport’s seventh overall state tournament played in North Dakota, but the first tournament as a fully NDHSAA-sponsored sport. Grand Forks High School (now Grand Forks Central) won all six of the non-sponsored championships during the previous years.

Grand Forks Central holds the most boys titles (29). As of 2024, the current boys champions are the Grand Forks Red River Roughriders. There are currently 19 high school hockey programs split into two regions. The west region is made up of Bismarck High, Bismarck Legacy, Bismarck Century, Bottineau/Rugby, Hazen/Beulah, Minot, Williston, Dickinson, Jamestown, and Mandan. The east region consists of Grand Forks Central, Grand Forks Red River, Fargo North/South, Fargo Davies, West Fargo, Grafton/Park River, Fargo Shanley, West Fargo Sheyenne, Mayville/Portland-Clifford-Galesburg, and Devils Lake.
