= Circle of death (boating) =

Motorboating hazard

The circle of death is a hazardous phenomenon experienced by motorboats.

A circle of death can be initiated if the boat operator releases the steering mechanism while the boat is still powered, which means the propeller is still turning. The force of the rotating propeller blades incurs a force known as steering torque, causing the motor itself, which is mounted on a swivel jointed mechanism, to turn sharply into the direction of the blades. This causes the boat to cut sharply to the opposite direction, which can throw the operator and any passengers overboard. The boat then begins spinning in circles, oftentimes around the ejected passengers, who are in danger of being struck by the spinning propeller over and over again.

The most common preventative safety recommendation, aside from simply ensuring maintained control of the wheel while the vehicle is in motion, is the installation of an automatic kill switch.
