= Mikhail Chernov (ice hockey) =

Russian ice hockey player (born 1978)

- Born: November 11, 1978 (age 47) Prokopyevsk, USSR
- Height: 6 ft 2 in (188 cm)
- Weight: 203 lb (92 kg; 14 st 7 lb)
- Position: Defence
- Shot: Left
- Played for: Lokomotiv Yaroslavl; Spartak Moscow; Ak Bars Kazan; Metallurg Novokuznetsk; SKA St. Petersburg; Salavat Yulaev Ufa; Sibir Novosibirsk; HC Vityaz; Metallurg Novokuznetsk
- NHL draft: 103rd overall, 1997; Philadelphia Flyers
- Playing career: 1996–2014

Mikhail Yurevich Chernov (Russian: Михаи́л Ю́рьевич Черно́в; born November 11, 1978) is a Russian former professional ice hockey defenceman who played in the Russian Superleague and the Kontinental Hockey League.

== Playing career ==
Chernov was drafted 103rd overall by the Philadelphia Flyers in the 1997 NHL entry draft, but spent three seasons playing in the American Hockey League for the Philadelphia Phantoms and never played in the National Hockey League. He returned to Russia in 2001, splitting the season with Lokomotiv Yaroslavl and Spartak Moscow. After a brief spell with Ak Bars Kazan, Chernov signed with Metallurg Novokuznetsk in 2003, where he spent two seasons. In 2005, he signed with SKA St. Petersburg in another two-year spell which saw him achieve a career-high 17 points during 2006–07. In 2007, Chernov joined Salavat Yulayev Ufa.

== 1999 boating accident ==
On July 23, 1999, during the offseason, Chernov and Francis Belanger were on a boating trip to Okanagan Lake in British Columbia with Philadelphia Flyers defenseman Dmitri Tertyshny when the latter suffered fatal injuries in a freak accident.

== Career statistics ==
			Regular season					Playoffs
Season	Team	League	GP	G	A	Pts	PIM	GP	G	A	Pts	PIM
1996–97	Torpedo Yaroslavl	RSL	5	0	0	0	0	—	—	—	—	—
1997–98	Torpedo Yaroslavl	RSL	7	0	0	0	0	—	—	—	—	—
1998–99	Philadelphia Phantoms	AHL	56	4	3	7	98	14	1	0	1	8
1999–00	Philadelphia Phantoms	AHL	67	10	6	16	54	5	1	2	3	22
2000–01	Philadelphia Phantoms	AHL	50	8	12	20	32	6	1	2	3	4
2001–02	Lokomotiv Yaroslavl	RSL	2	0	0	0	2	—	—	—	—	—
2001–02	Spartak Moscow	RSL	21	2	2	4	18	—	—	—	—	—
2002–03	Spartak Moscow	RSL	32	7	3	10	28	—	—	—	—	—
2002–03	Ak Bars Kazan	RSL	4	0	0	0	2	—	—	—	—	—
2003–04	Metallurg Novokuznetsk	RSL	56	5	5	10	22	4	1	0	1	4
2004–05	Metallurg Novokuznetsk	RSL	53	6	3	9	48	4	0	0	0	10
2005–06	SKA Saint Petersburg	RSL	50	8	5	13	44	3	0	0	0	2
2006–07	SKA Saint Petersburg	RSL	50	9	9	18	36	3	1	0	1	2
2007–08	Salavat Yulaev Ufa	RSL	33	2	4	6	12	11	1	3	4	4
2008–09	Salavat Yulaev Ufa	KHL	18	3	6	8	22	4	0	0	0	2
2009–10	Sibir Novosibirsk	KHL
