= Alaska Allstars Hockey Association =

Youth ice hockey organization in Alaska, United States

The Alaska Allstars Hockey Association is a youth Ice hockey development organization based in Anchorage, Alaska. The association organizes teams at the mite, peewee, bantam and midget levels as well as Girls Hockey. The Non Profit Youth Hockey Association was started by Michael L. Cusack, MD. and his late wife Bonnie L. Cusack in 1982 as the first competition only hockey program in Alaska. Young All Star players traveled outside Alaska to gain the exposure needed to achieve Division 1 scholarships and National Hockey League (NHL) status for the first time. Alumni of the program include NHL players Scott Gomez of the Montreal Canadiens, Matthew Carle of the Tampa Bay Lightning, Scott Parker of the San Jose Sharks, Brandon Dubinsky of the New York Rangers, Ty Conklin of the St. Louis Blues, Joey Crabb of the Washington Capitals, Nate Thompson with Tampa Bay and Tim Wallace also with Tampa Bay.

NHL Draftees for 2012 include Austin Wuthrich, Right winger, 18 (currently a sophomore at Notre Dame University), who was picked fourth round by the Washington Capitals. He was the 107th of 211 players. Brian Cooper, a defenseman, 18, who will attend the University of Nebraska at Omaha was taken in the fifth round, 127th overall, by the Anaheim Ducks, and Hunter Fejes a left winger, 18, went in the sixth round, 178th overall, to the Phoenix Coyotes.
