= List of Adirondack Phantoms players =

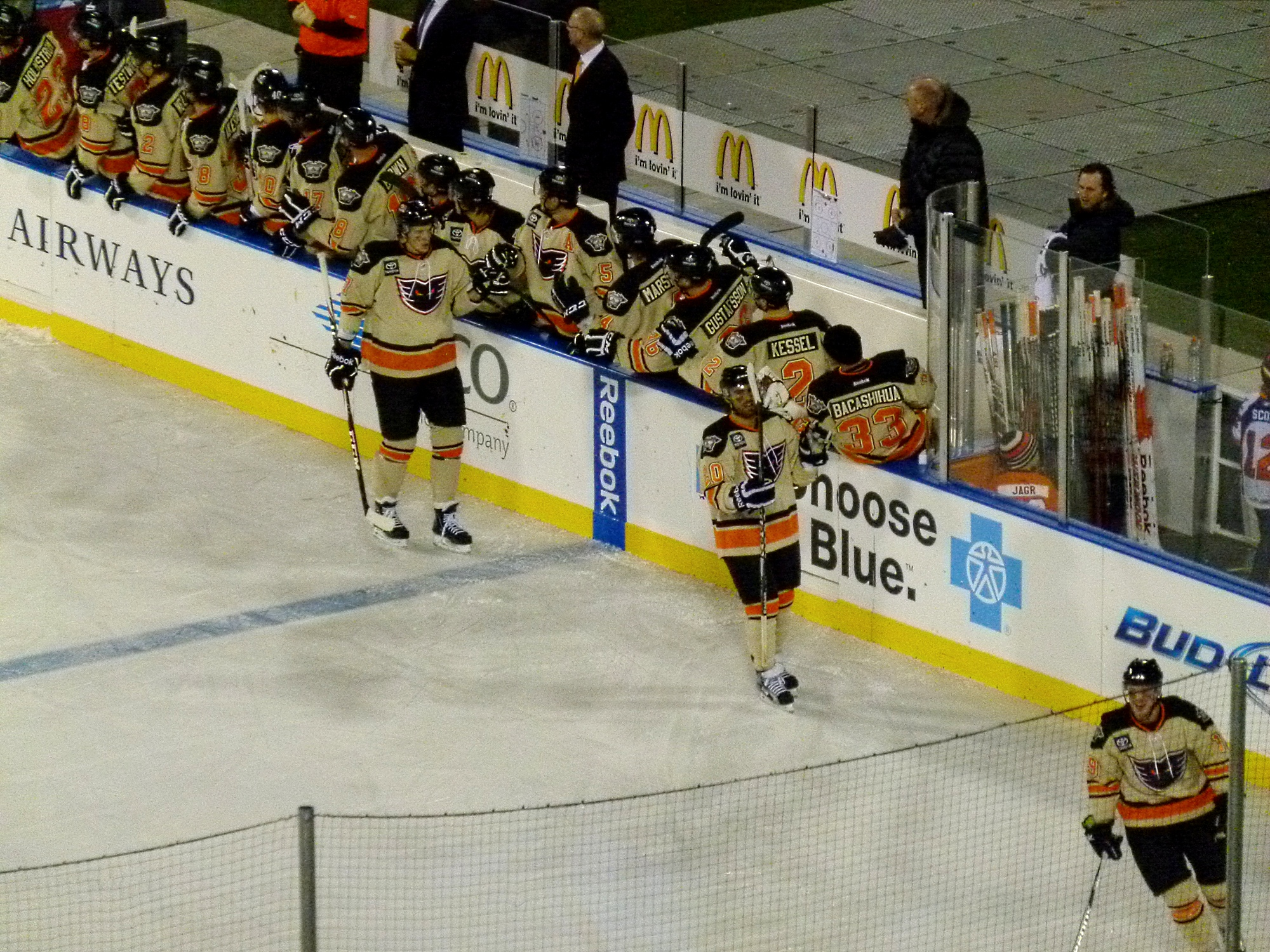
The Phantoms bench during the 2012 AHL Outdoor Classic played on January 6, 2012.

This is a complete list of ice hockey players who played for the Adirondack Phantoms of the American Hockey League (AHL). It includes players that played at least one match, either in the AHL regular season or in the AHL playoffs.

== Key ==
General abbreviations
Abbreviation	Definition
GP	Games played
AHLHOF	Inducted into the AHL Hall of Fame

Goaltender statistical abbreviations
Abbreviation	Definition
W	Wins
L	Losses
OTL	Overtime loss
SO	Shutouts
GAA	Goals against average
SV%	Save percentage

Skater statistical abbreviations
Abbreviation	Definition
Pos	Position
G	Goals
A	Assists
P	Points
PIM	Penalty minutes
D	Defenseman
F	Forward
LW	Left wing
C	Center
RW	Right wing

== Goaltenders ==
Goaltenders who played for the Adirondack Phantoms
Name	Nat	Seasons^{[a]}	Regular season							Notes
Name	Nat	Seasons^{[a]}	GP	W	L	OTL	SO	GAA	SV%	Notes
Jason Bacashihua	(Canada)	2011–2012	23	8	11	1	1	2.99	.901	
Johan Backlund	(Sweden)	2009–2012	75	31	36	5	2	2.98	.900	
Brian Boucher	(United States)	2009–2010; 2012–2013	17	7	8	1	0	2.53	.906	
Tony Capobianco	(Canada)	2013–2014	3	1	2	0	0	2.88	.906	
Carsen Chubak	(Canada)	2013–2014	11	4	2	0	0	2.33	.928	
Yann Danis	(Canada)	2013–2014	31	9	11	4	2	3.01	.897	
Jeremy Duchesne	(Canada)	2009–2010	5	1	3	0	1	2.97	.898	
Ray Emery	(Canada)	2009–2010	1	0	1	0	0	2.03	.857	
John Grahame	(United States)	2009–2010	12	2	10	0	0	2.94	.896	
Cal Heeter	(United States)	2012–2014	76	28	41	5	4	2.76	.910	
Carter Hutton	(Canada)	2009–2010	4	1	2	1	0	2.71	.921	
Michael Leighton	(Canada)	2010–2013	88	43	39	4	7	2.44	.921	AHLHOF 2025
Kris Mayotte	(United States)	2009–2010	1	0	1	0	0	7.97	.733	
Scott Munroe	(Canada)	2012–2013	31	12	16	0	1	2.78	.913	
Brad Phillips	(United States)	2011–2012	1	1	0	0	0	3.00	.921	
Nicola Riopel	(Canada)	2009–2011	21	7	13	0	1	3.45	.884	
Brian Stewart	(Canada)	2009–2011	13	5	7	0	0	3.19	.889	
Michael Teslak	(Canada)	2009–2010	5	1	1	1	0	3.86	.871	

== Skaters ==
Skaters who played for the Adirondack Phantoms
Name	Nat	Pos	Seasons^{[a]}	Regular season					Notes
Name	Nat	Pos	Seasons^{[a]}	GP	G	A	P	PIM	Notes
Jason Akeson	(Canada)	RW	2011–2014	208	58	114	172	95	
Brandon Alderson	(Canada)	RW	2012–2014	80	14	9	23	44	
Mark Alt	(United States)	D	2012–2014	75	5	23	28	33	
Oskars Bartulis	(Latvia)	D	2009–2012	52	3	13	16	36	
Josh Beaulieu	(Canada)	D	2009–2010	46	2	2	4	11	
Rob Bellamy	(United States)	RW	2009–2010	62	2	5	7	20	
Denis Bodrov	(Russia)	D	2009–2010	17	1	3	4	6	
Andy Bohmbach	(United States)	LW	2011–2012	10	0	1	1	2	
Rob Bordson	(United States)	LW	2010–2014	236	32	46	78	148	
Jean Bourbeau	(Canada)	LW	2011–2012	1	0	0	0	0	
Marc-Andre Bourdon	(Canada)	D	2009–2014	149	5	35	40	239	
Tyler Brown	(Canada)	C	2011–2014	182	14	18	32	72	
Kyle Bushee	(United States)	D	2013–2014	3	0	0	0	0	
Chris Clackson	(United States)	LW	2009–2010	2	0	0	0	0	
Matt Clackson	(Canada)	LW	2009–2011	122	3	7	10	292	
Doug Clarkson	(Canada)	F	2013–2014	5	0	0	0	9	
Brendan Connolly	(Canada)	C	2010–2011	3	0	0	0	2	
Nick Cousins	(Canada)	C	2011–2014	82	11	18	29	49	
Sean Couturier	(Canada)	C	2012–2013	31	10	18	28	16	
Sean Curry	(United States)	D	2009–2010	66	4	7	11	73	
Trent Daavettila	(United States)	LW	2009–2010	13	0	2	2	2	
Steven Delisle	(Canada)	D	2013–2014	50	1	3	4	76	
Jeff Dimmen	(United States)	D	2012–2013	34	4	10	14	30	
Ryan Dingle	(United States)	LW	2009–2010	54	5	5	10	18	
Cullen Eddy	(United States)	D	2010–2014	218	8	28	36	362	
Zack Fitzgerald	(United States)	LW	2012–2014	74	1	1	2	433	
Kyle Flanagan	(United States)	C	2012–2014	76	7	22	29	18	
Matthew Ford	(United States)	RW	2011–2013	66	23	21	44	47	
Bruno Gervais	(Canada)	D	2013–2014	59	10	16	26	24	
Shayne Gostisbehere	(United States)	D	2013–2014	2	0	0	0	0	
Kevin Goumas	(United States)	LW	2013–2014	11	1	3	4	8	
Erik Gustafsson	(Sweden)	D	2009–2013	144	13	82	95	65	
Robert Hagg	(Sweden)	D	2013–2014	10	1	3	4	10	
Denis Hamel	(Canada)	LW	2010–2012	140	48	48	96	64	AHLHOF 2020
Shane Harper	(United States)	RW	2009–2013	143	20	21	41	84	
Ben Holmstrom	(United States)	C	2009–2014	256	49	73	122	403	Captain: 2011–2014
Tyler Hostetter	(United States)	D	2010–2012	10	0	0	0	0	
Dan Jancevski	(Canada)	D	2010–2012	150	3	26	29	87	Captain: 2010–2011
Andrew Johnston	(Canada)	LW	2012–2014	36	2	3	5	7	
Randy Jones	(Canada)	D	2009–2010	6	0	1	1	6	
Jon Kalinski	(Canada)	LW	2009–2012	182	25	38	63	133	
Lukas Kaspar	(Czech Republic)	LW	2009–2010	8	1	2	3	4	
Blake Kessel	(United States)	D	2011–2013	63	3	19	22	12	
Garrett Klotz	(Canada)	LW	2009–2012	106	4	6	10	120	
Krys Kolanos	(Canada)	C	2009–2010	27	9	6	15	22	
Matt Konan	(United States)	D	2012–2014	71	2	6	8	76	
David Laliberte	(Canada)	RW	2009–2011; 2012–2013	106	24	42	66	72	
Maxim Lamarche	(Canada)	D	2013–2014	12	0	1	1	7	
Scott Laughton	(Canada)	C	2012–2013	6	1	2	3	0	
Oliver Lauridsen	(Denmark)	D	2010–2014	189	5	19	24	359	
Stefan Legein	(Canada)	RW	2009–2011	112	29	22	51	72	
Joonas Lehtivuori	(Finland)	D	2009–2011	98	7	25	32	42	
Andreas Lilja	(Sweden)	D	2011–2013	34	1	8	9	44	
Matt Mangene	(Canada)	F	2011–2014	92	8	9	17	40	
Brandon Manning	(Canada)	D	2011–2014	184	20	51	71	447	
Patrick Maroon	(United States)	LW	2009–2011	76	16	36	52	155	
Kevin Marshall	(Canada)	D	2009–2012	185	7	21	28	255	
Mike Matczak	(United States)	D	2010–2011; 2013–2014	38	1	3	4	14	
Derek Mathers	(Canada)	RW	2011–2014	55	3	0	3	155	
Jon Matsumoto	(Canada)	C	2009–2010	80	30	32	62	50	
Tye McGinn	(Canada)	LW	2011–2014	163	46	33	79	161	
Greg Moore	(United States)	C	2010–2011	57	7	13	20	18	
Joey Mormina	(Canada)	D	2009–2010	77	5	18	23	102	
Kory Nagy	(Canada)	C	2012–2013	1	0	0	0	0	
Kris Newbury	(Canada)	C	2013–2014	46	14	22	36	182	
Andreas Nodl	(Austria)	RW	2009–2010	65	14	20	34	24	
Marcel Noebels	(Germany)	F	2012–2014	95	16	18	34	35	
Luke Pither	(Canada)	C	2010–2012	106	11	19	30	37	
Mika Pyorala	(Finland)	LW	2009–2010	34	8	10	18	10	
Michael Raffl	(Austria)	LW	2013–2014	2	1	2	3	0	
Mike Ratchuk	(United States)	D	2009–2010	5	0	1	1	2	
Matt Read	(Canada)	C	2010–2011	11	7	6	13	6	
Zac Rinaldo	(Canada)	C	2010–2013	95	6	10	16	434	
Garrett Roe	(United States)	LW	2011–2013	129	20	46	66	85	
Jared Ross	(United States)	C	2009–2010	73	12	34	46	40	Captain: 2009–2010
Andrew Rowe	(United States)	LW	2010–2012	89	15	8	23	26	
Michael Ryan	(United States)	LW	2010–2011	52	25	16	41	47	
Brayden Schenn	(Canada)	C	2011–2013	40	19	26	45	19	
Tommy Serratore	(United States)	LW	2013–2014	4	1	0	1	16	
Tom Sestito	(United States)	LW	2010–2013	46	11	9	20	167	
Jon Sim	(Canada)	LW	2012–2013	34	6	13	19	22	
Ian Slater	(United States)	C	2012–2013	32	0	1	1	73	
David Sloane	(United States)	D	2009–2010	20	0	1	1	23	
Daniel Steiner	(Switzerland)	RW	2009–2010	1	0	0	0	0	
Logan Stephenson	(Canada)	D	2009–2011	105	3	10	13	186	
Petr Straka	(Czech Republic)	RW	2013–2014	60	9	18	27	22	
Danny Syvret	(Canada)	D	2009–2011; 2012–2013	142	21	67	88	67	
J. P. Testwuide	(United States)	D	2010–2011	48	1	4	5	56	
Mike Testwuide	(United States)	RW	2010–2013	161	32	38	70	168	
Andy Thomas	(United States)	D	2011–2012	12	0	0	0	2	
Mario Valery-Trabucco	(Canada)	RW	2009–2010	2	0	0	0	2	
Chris VandeVelde	(United States)	C	2013–2014	41	10	14	24	27	
Mitch Wahl	(United States)	C	2012–2013	15	1	3	4	6	
Matt Walker	(Canada)	D	2010–2012	44	1	6	7	49	
Jason Ward	(Canada)	RW	2009–2010	56	12	17	29	30	
Eric Wellwood	(Canada)	LW	2010–2013	164	34	32	66	42	
Derek Whitmore	(United States)	LW	2013–2014	18	5	6	11	4	
Darcy Zajac	(United States)	RW	2009–2010	2	0	0	0	0	
Harry Zolnierczyk	(Canada)	LW	2010–2013	107	20	23	43	128	

== Gallery ==
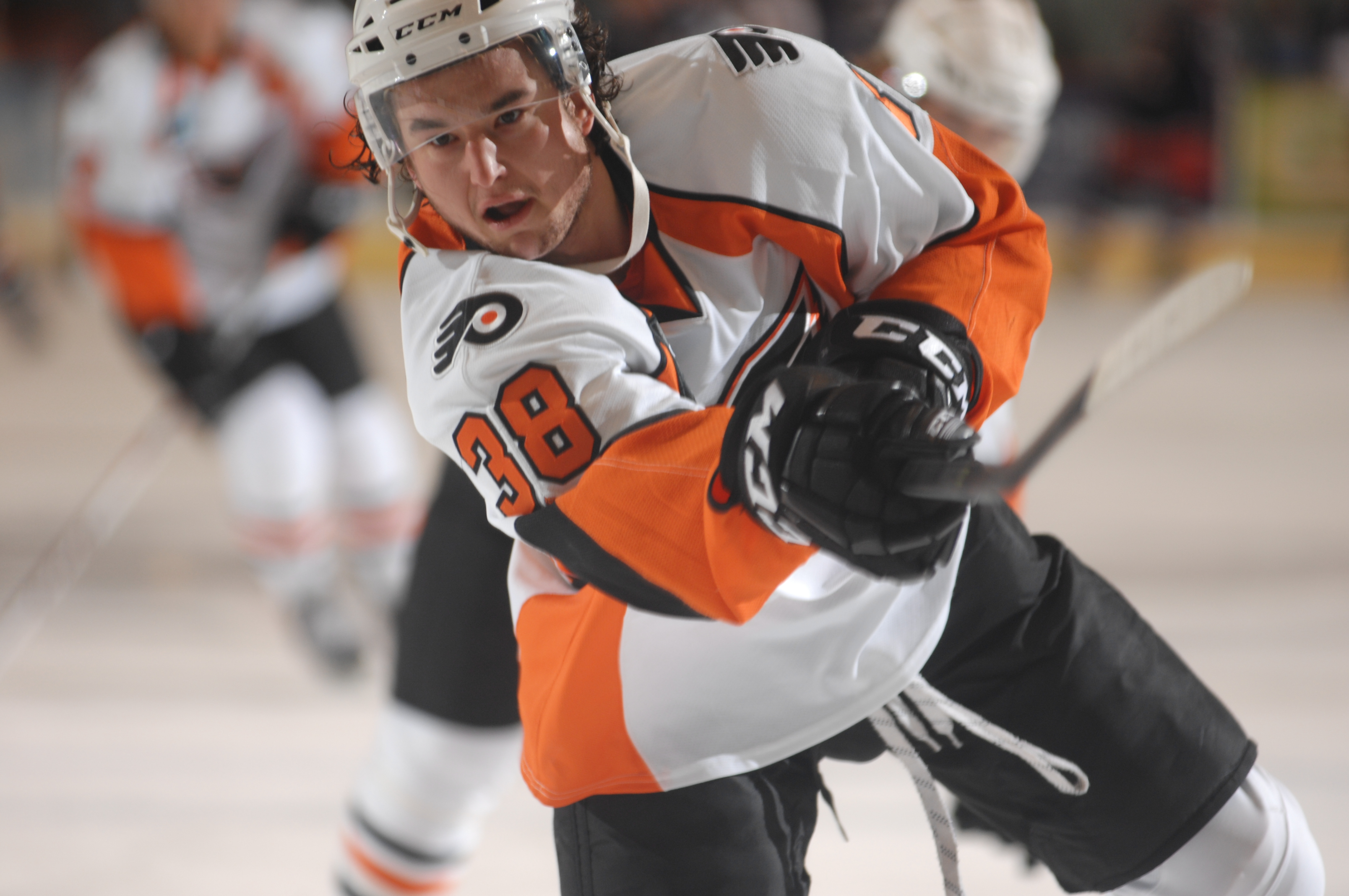
Jason Akeson played three seasons for the Phantoms.

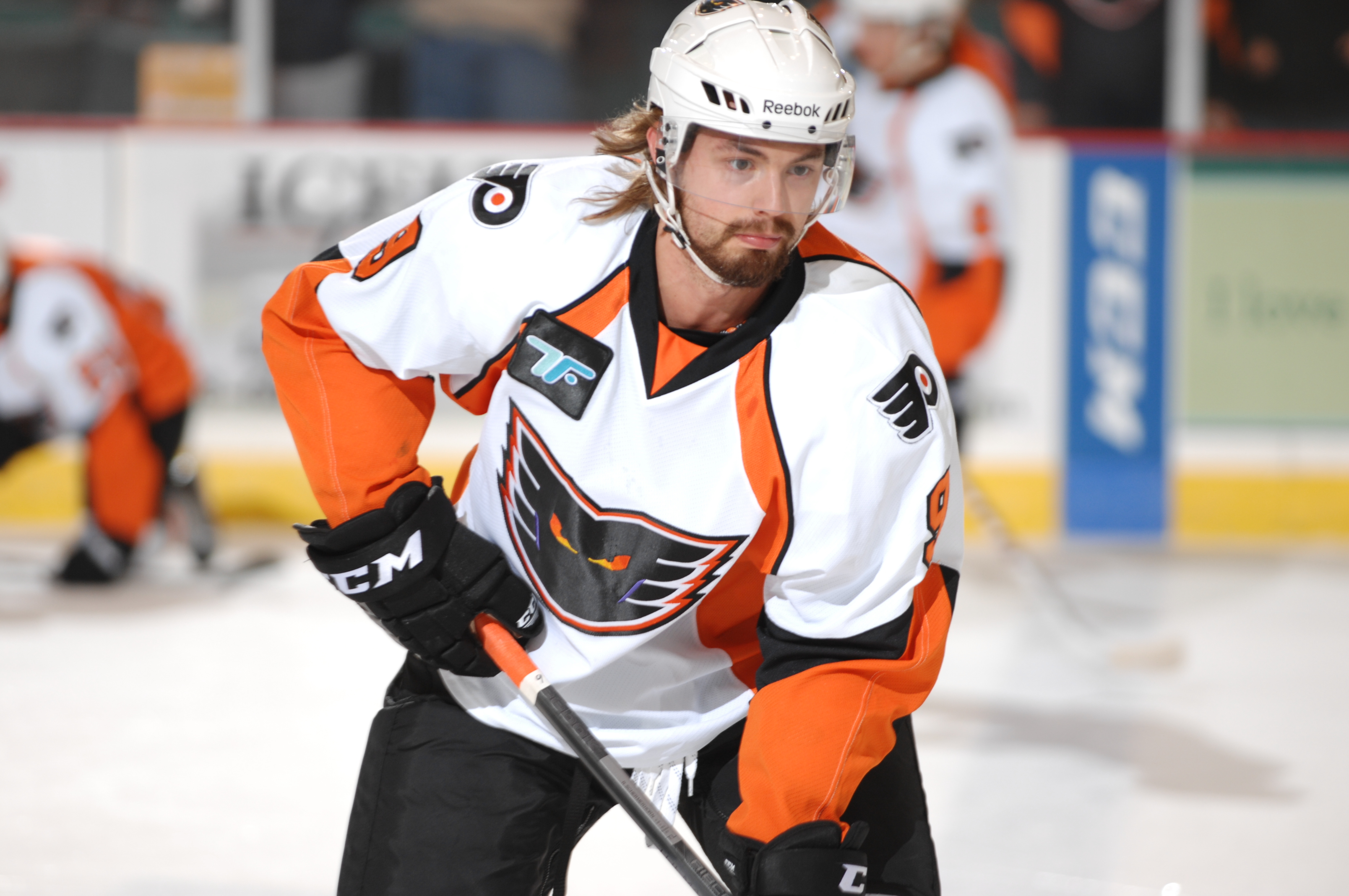
Rob Bordson played four seasons for the Phantoms.

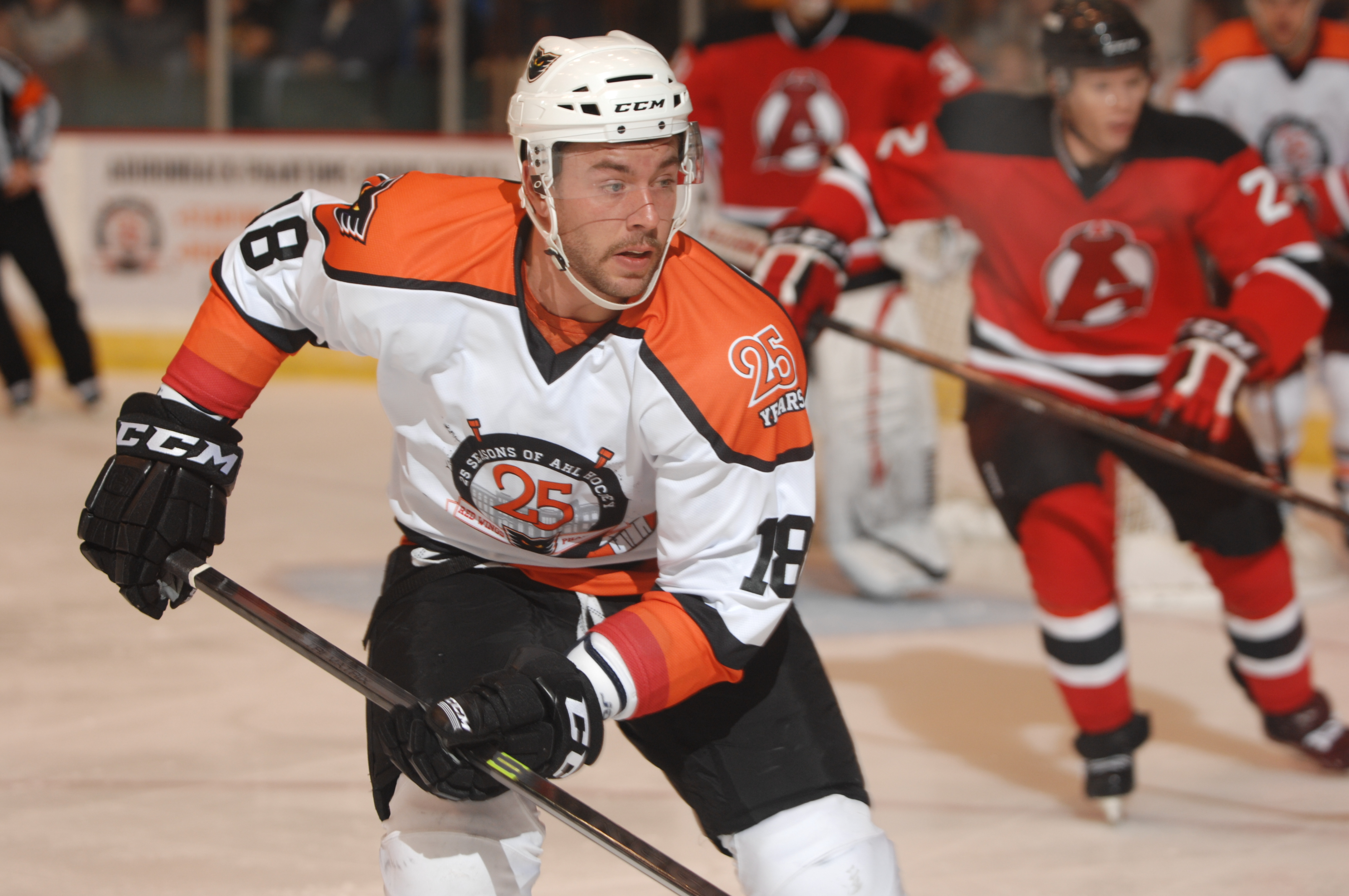
Tyler Brown played three seasons for the Phantoms.

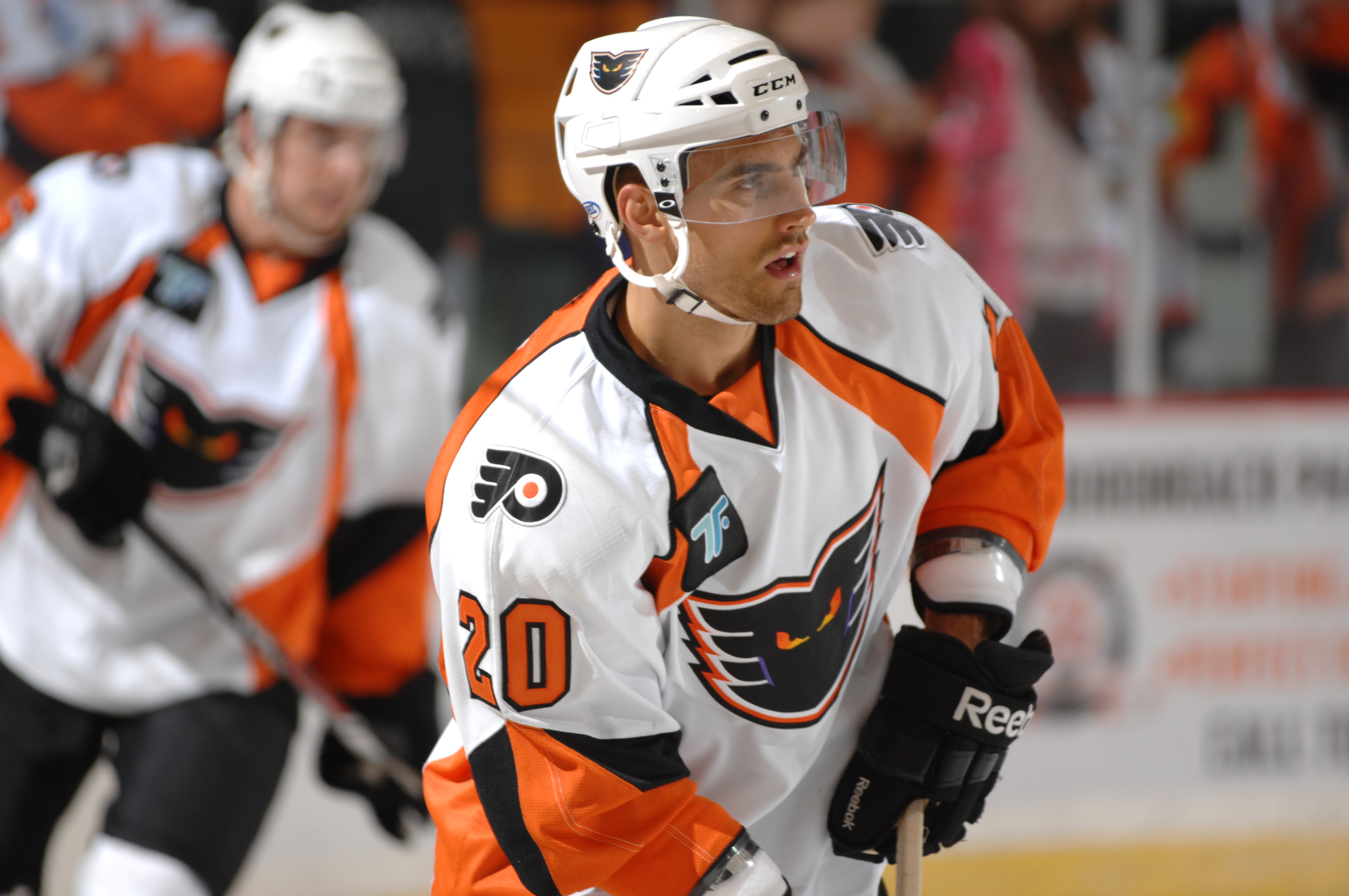
Cullen Eddy played four seasons for the Phantoms.

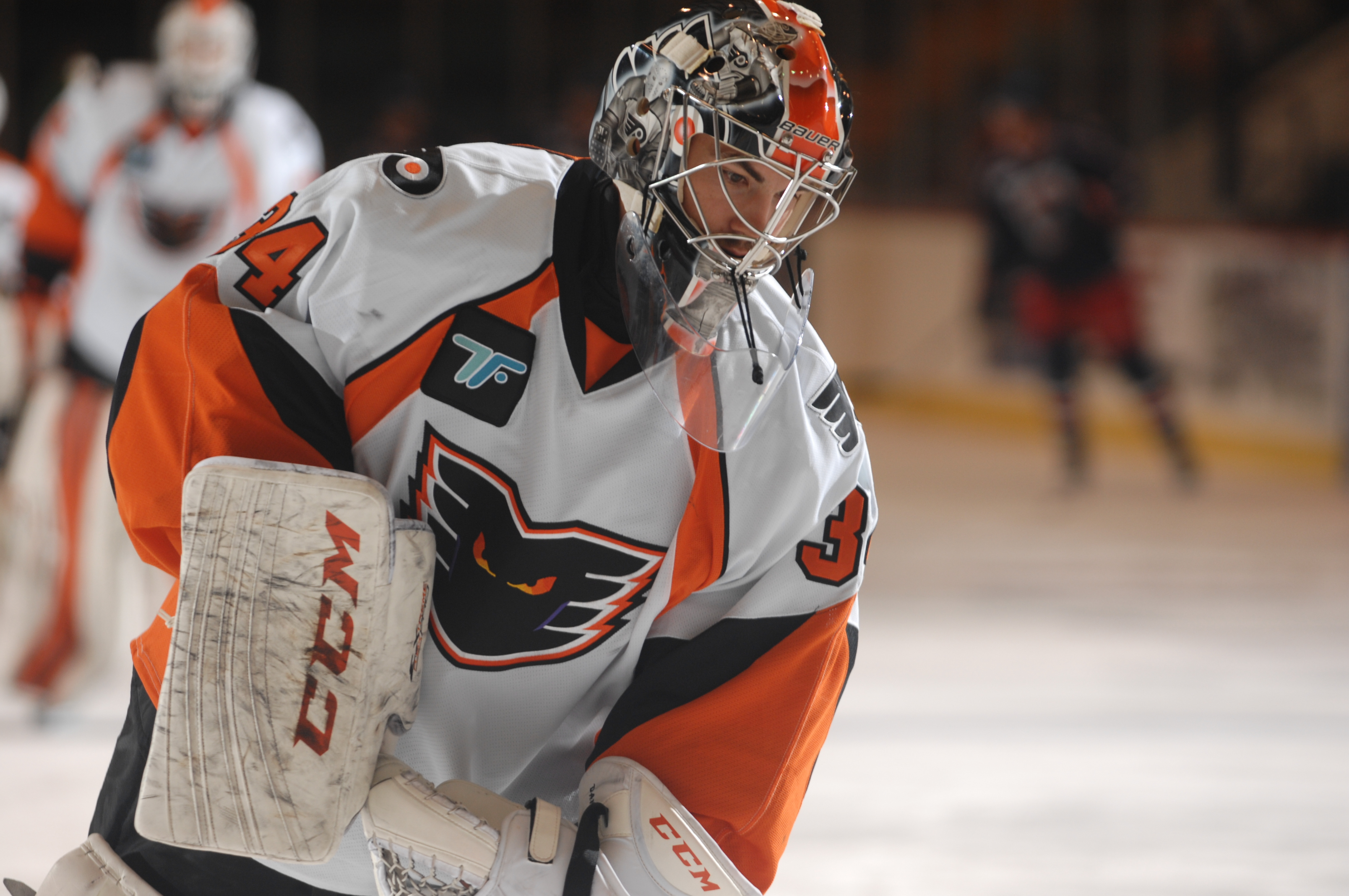
Yann Danis played one season for the Phantoms.

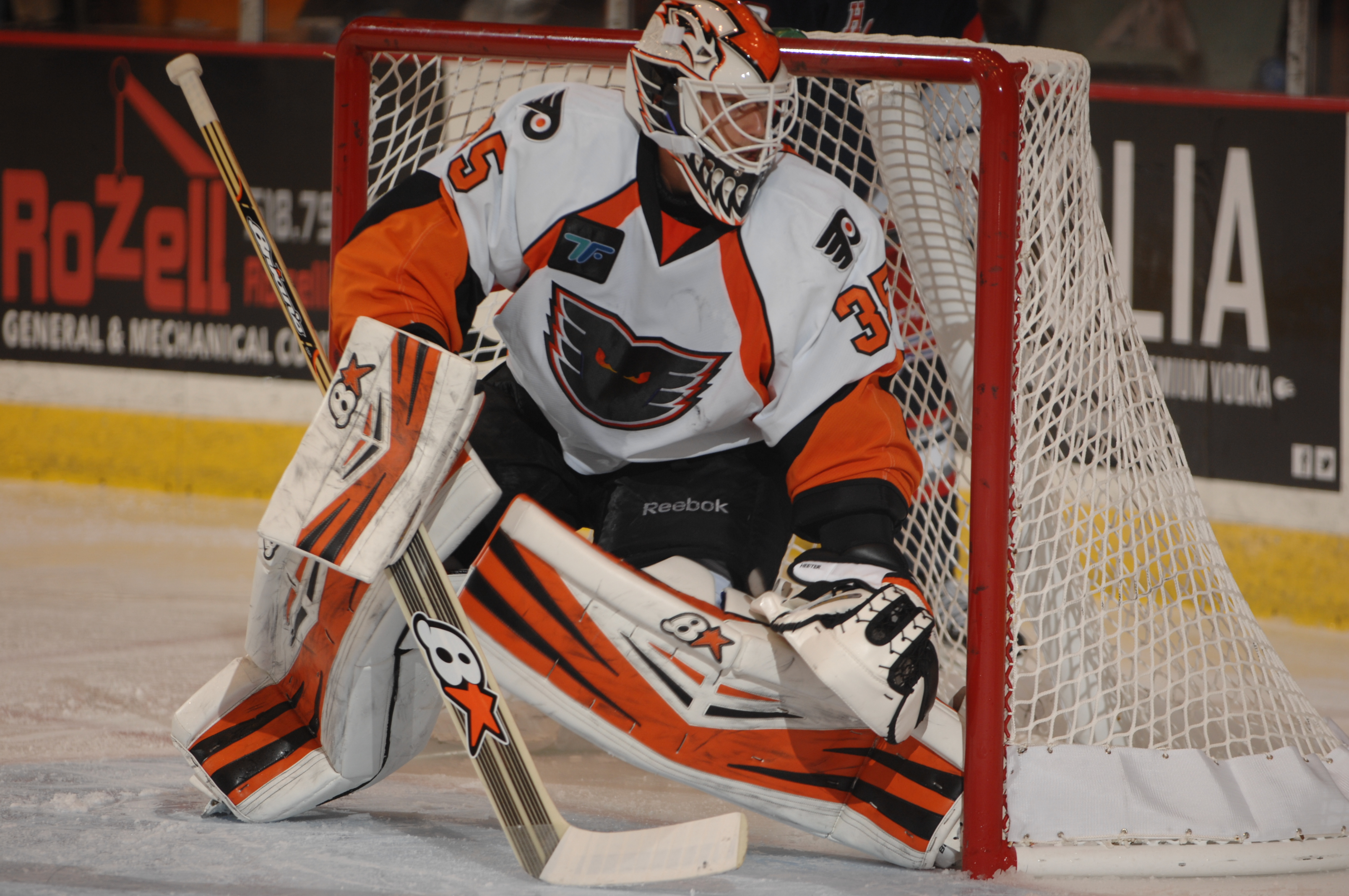
Cal Heeter played two seasons for the Phantoms.

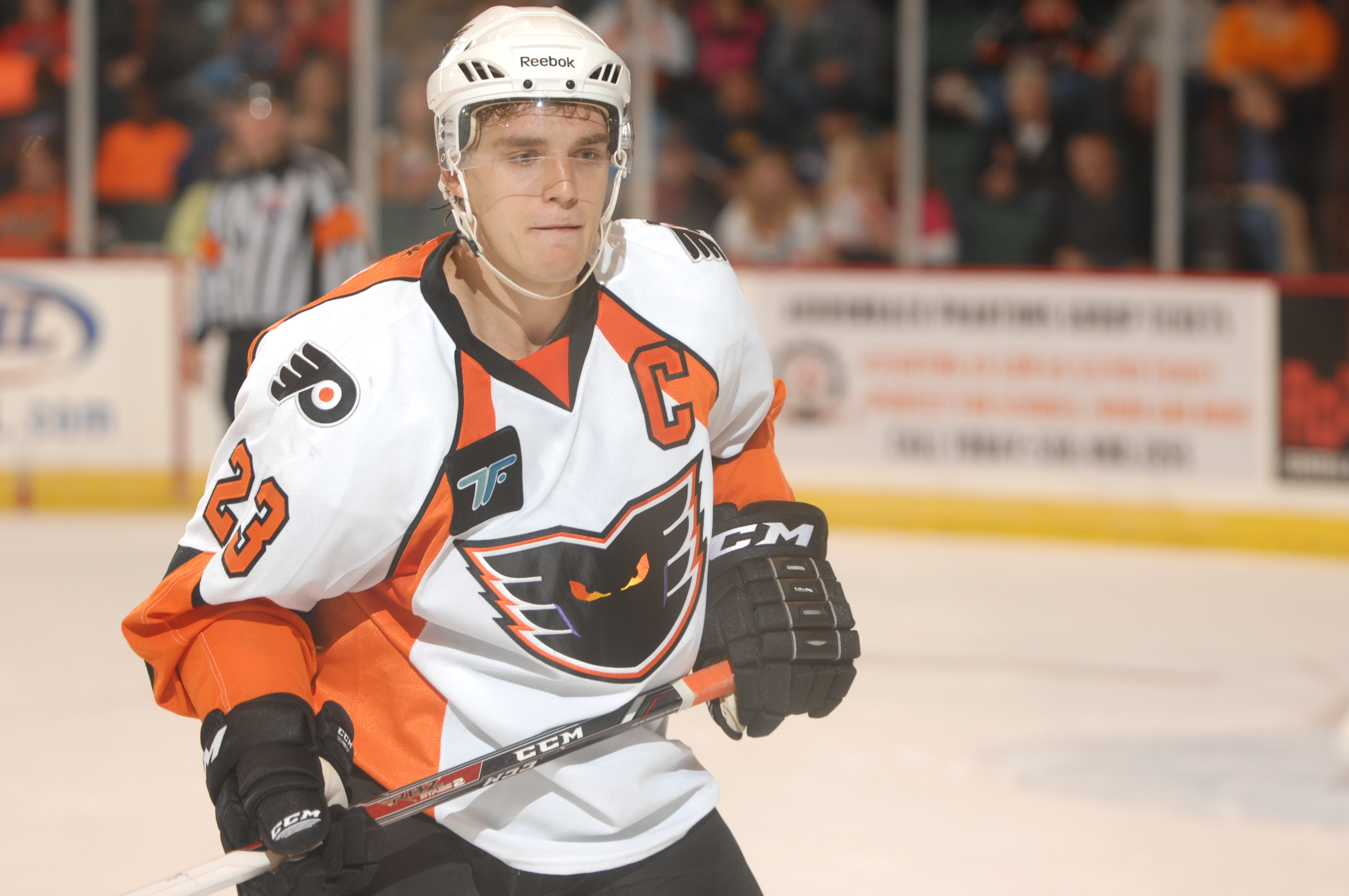
Ben Holmstrom served as team captain for three of his five seasons with the Phantoms.

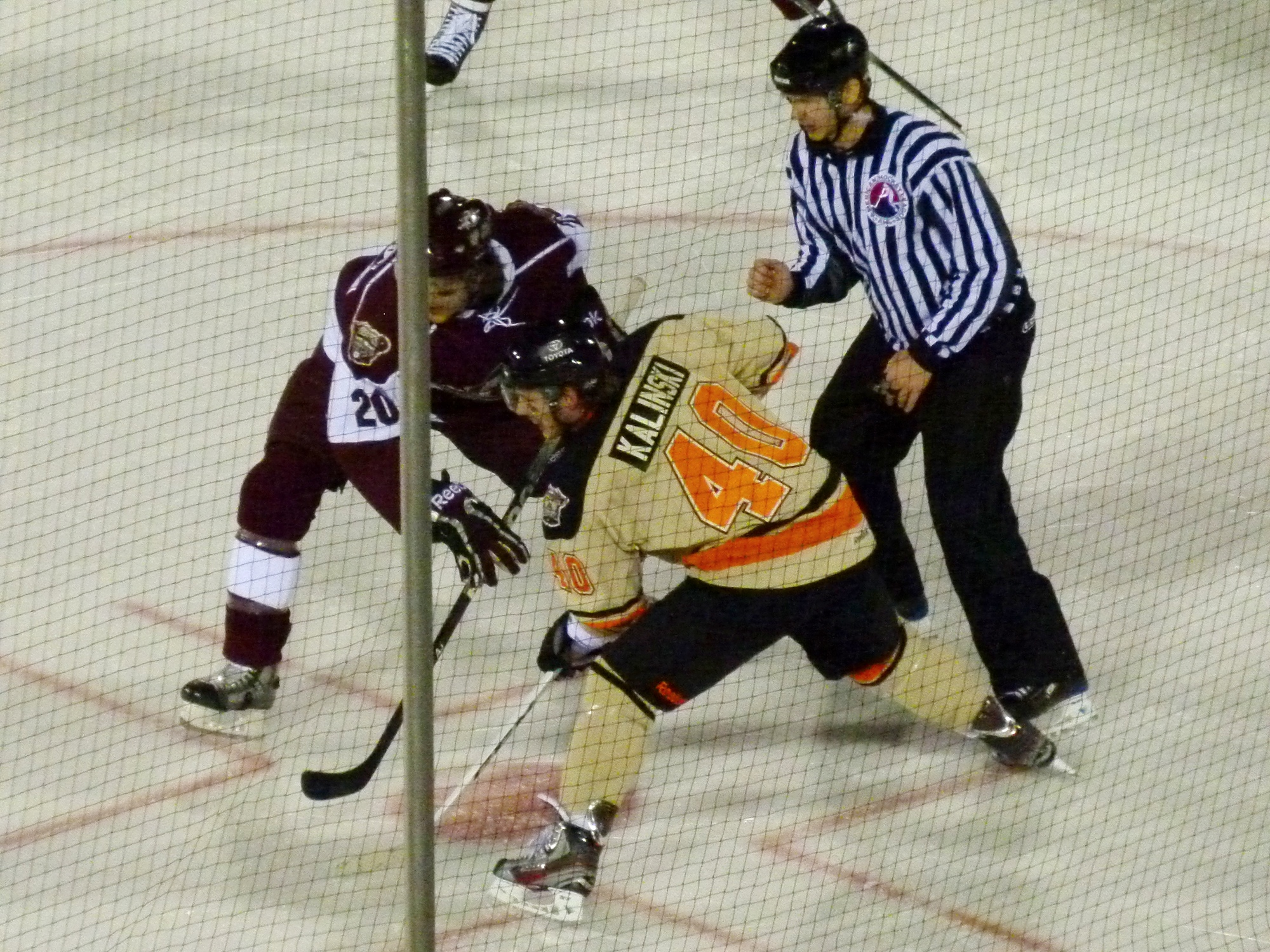
Jon Kalinski played three seasons for the Adirondack Phantoms.

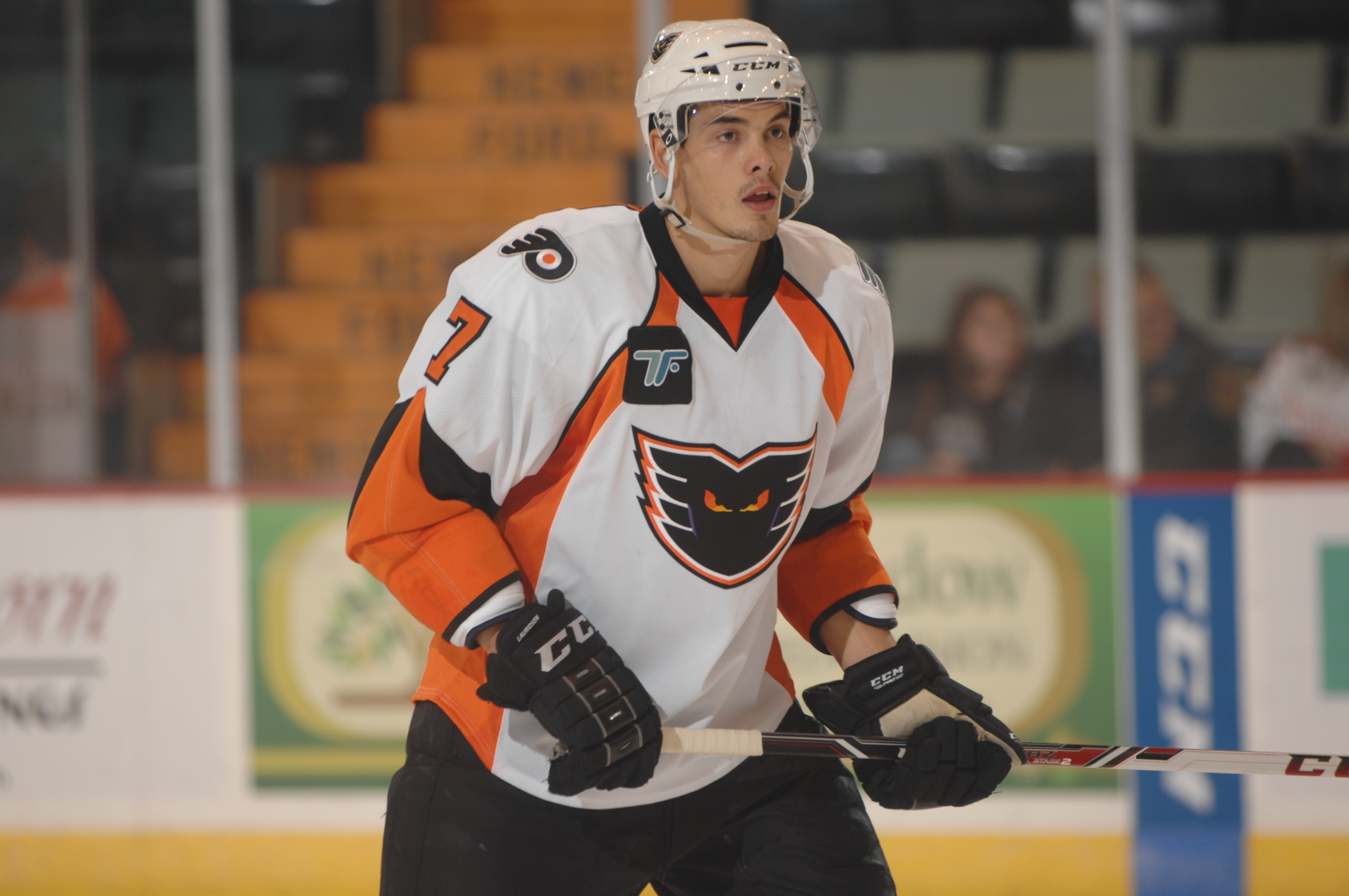
Oliver Lauridsen played four seasons for the Phantoms.

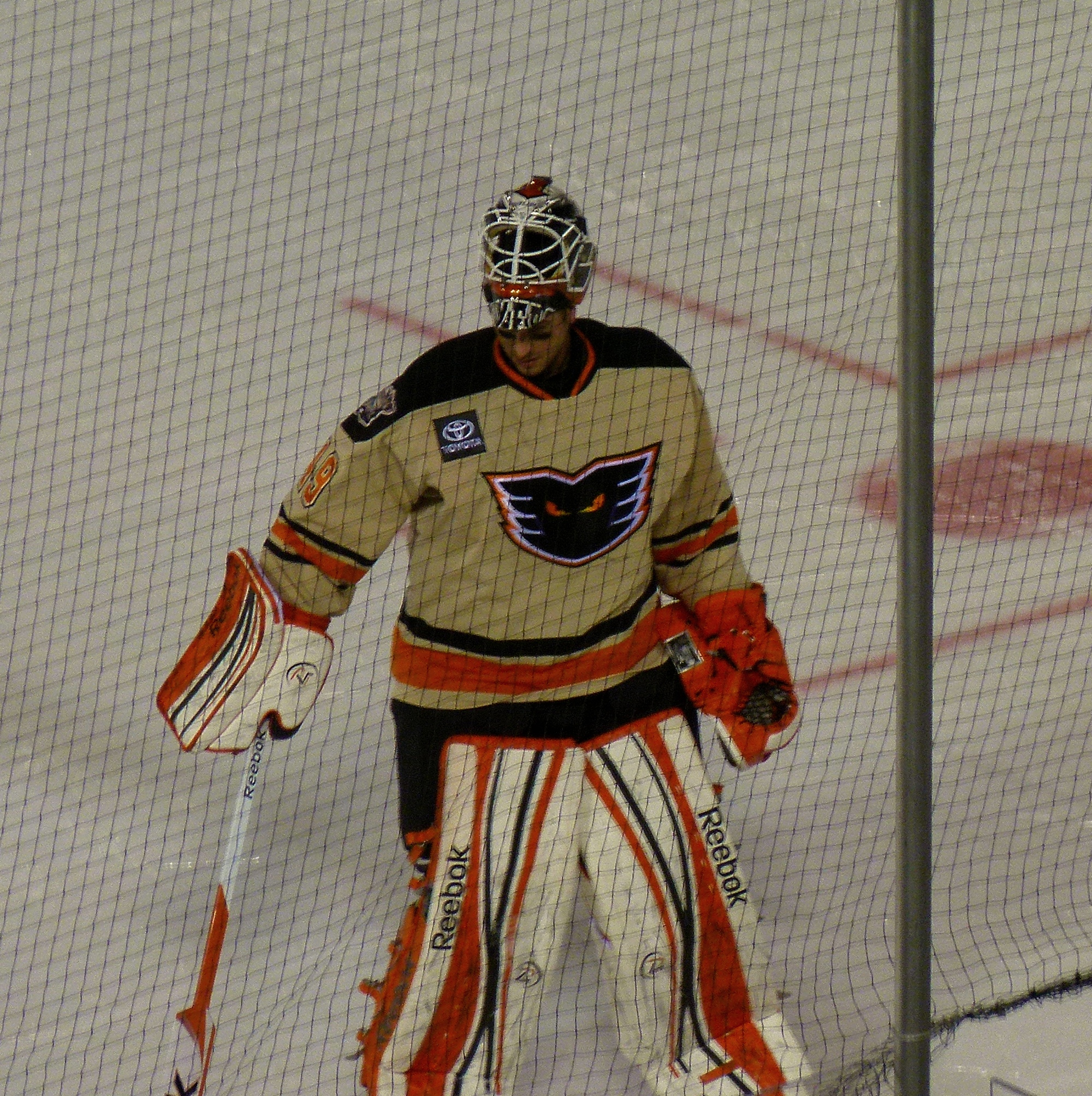
Michael Leighton played three seasons for the Adirondack Phantoms.

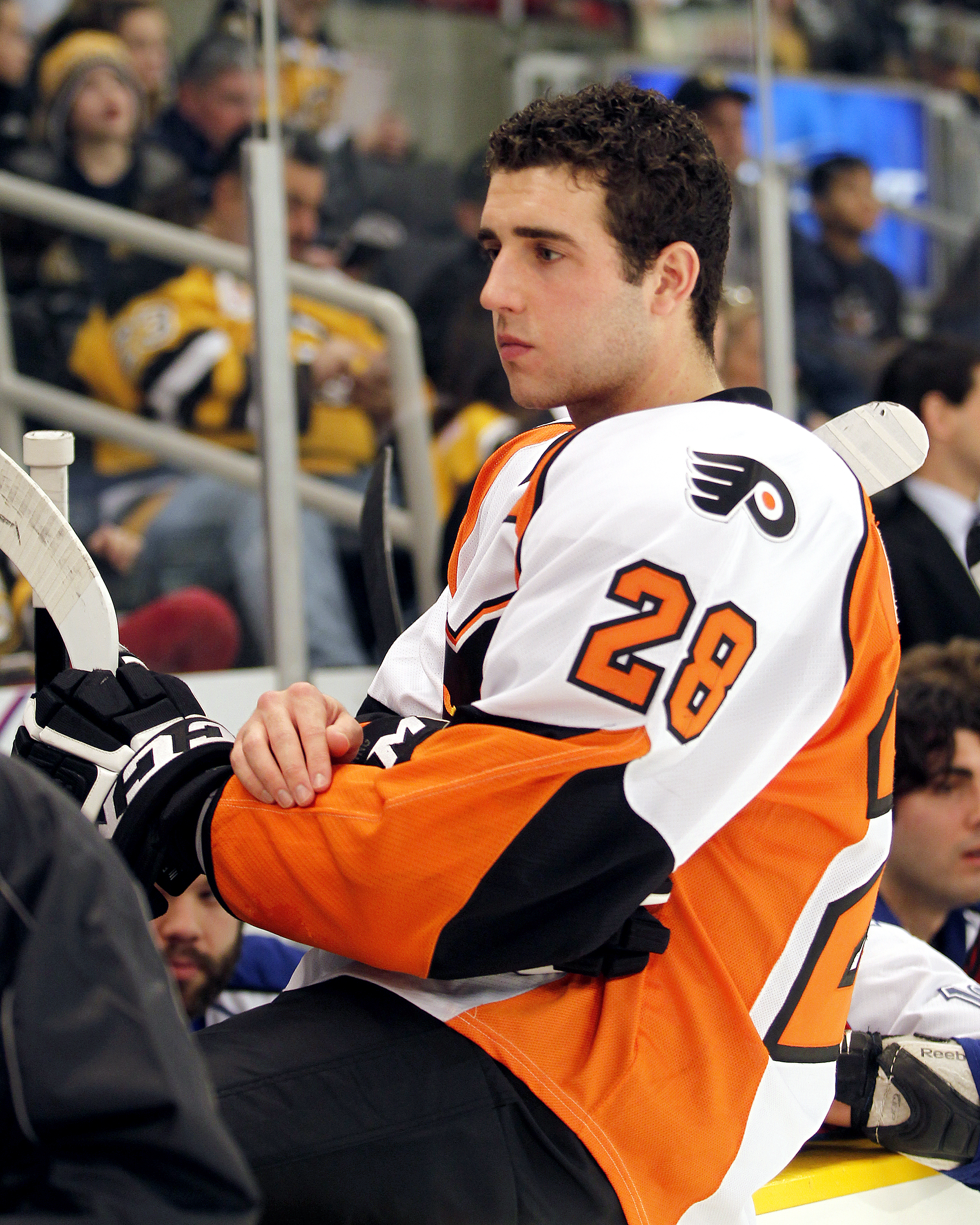
Brandon Manning played three seasons for the Adirondack Phantoms.

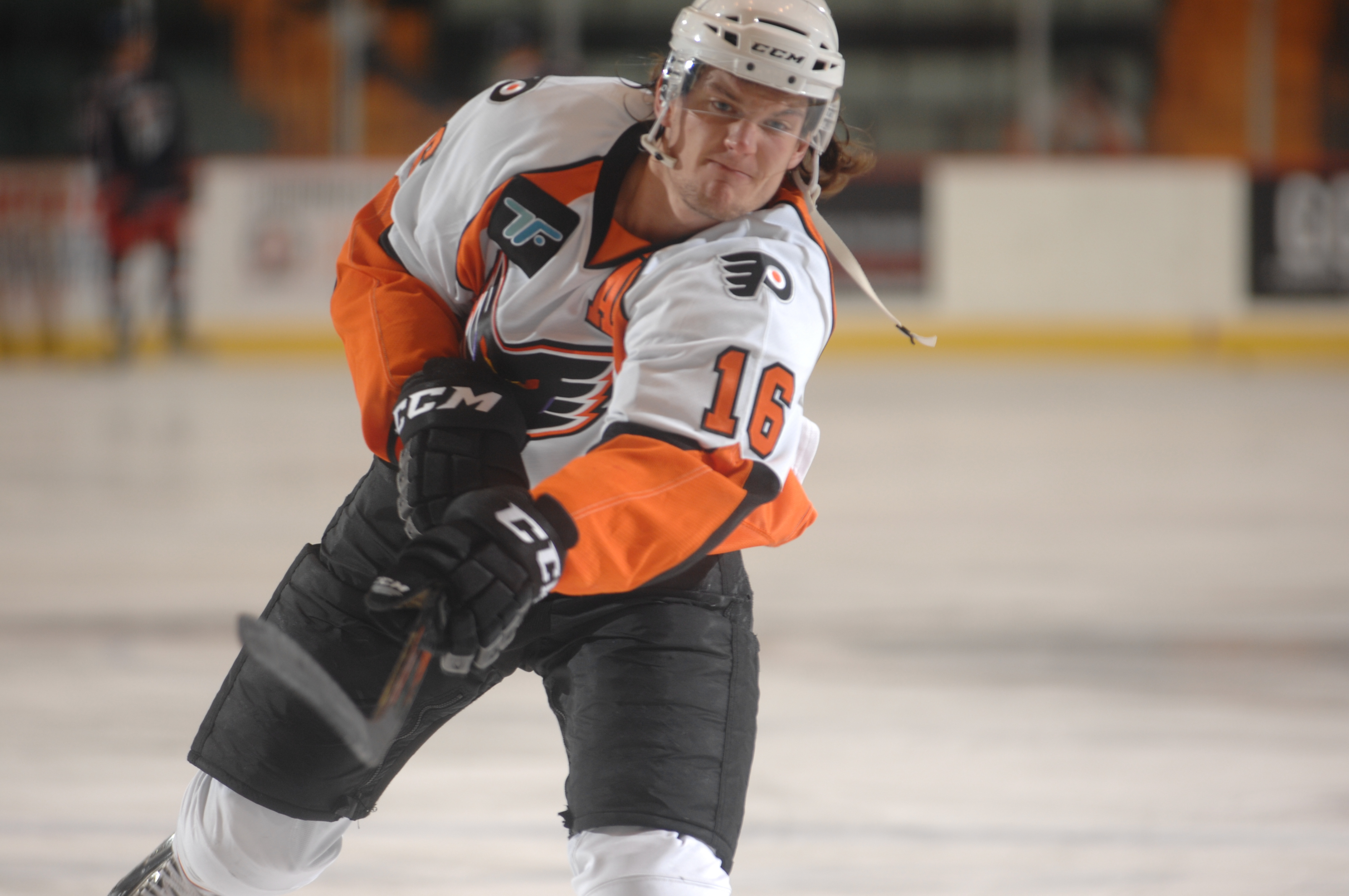
Tye McGinn played three seasons for the Phantoms.

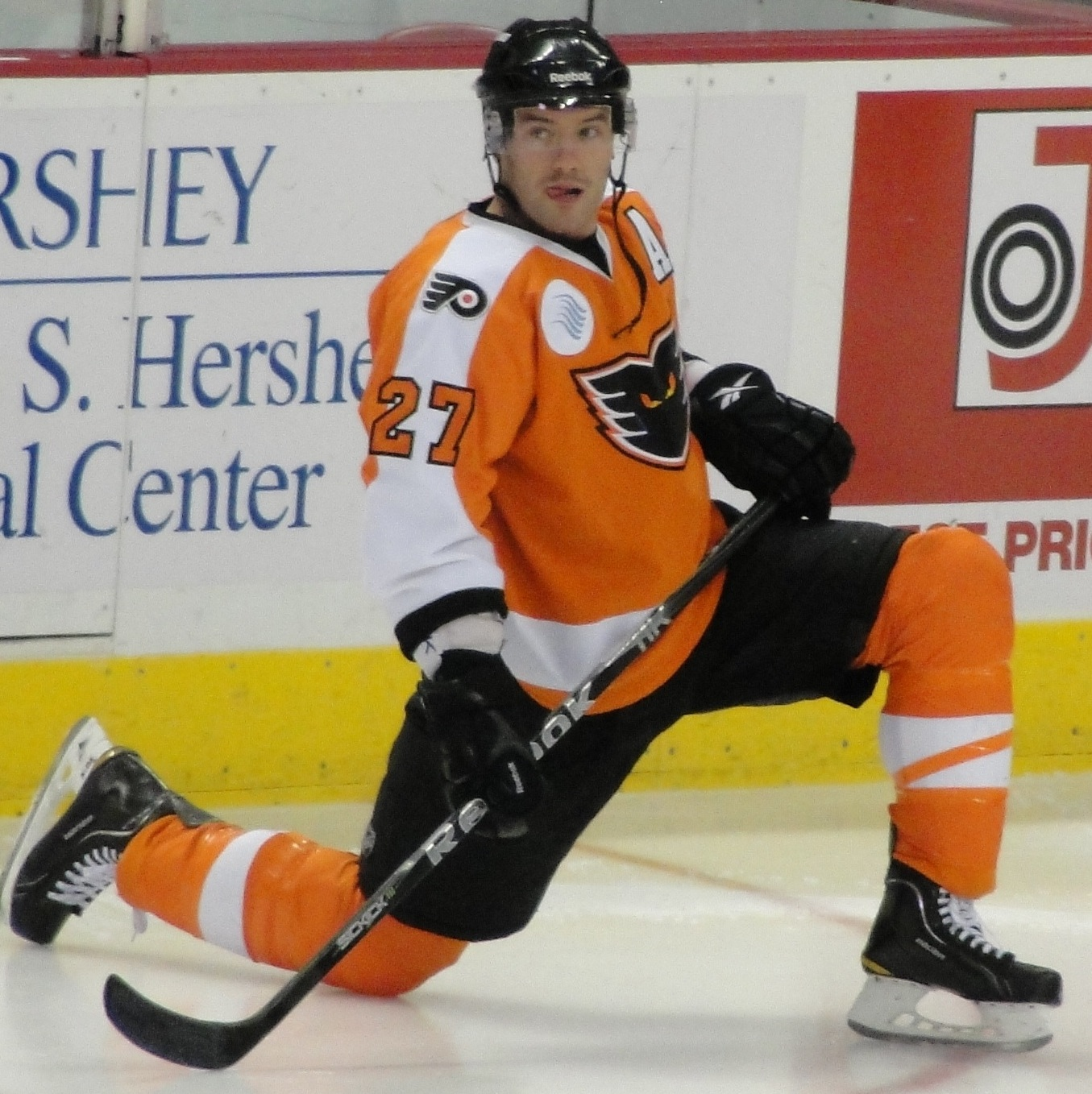
Greg Moore played one season for the Phantoms.

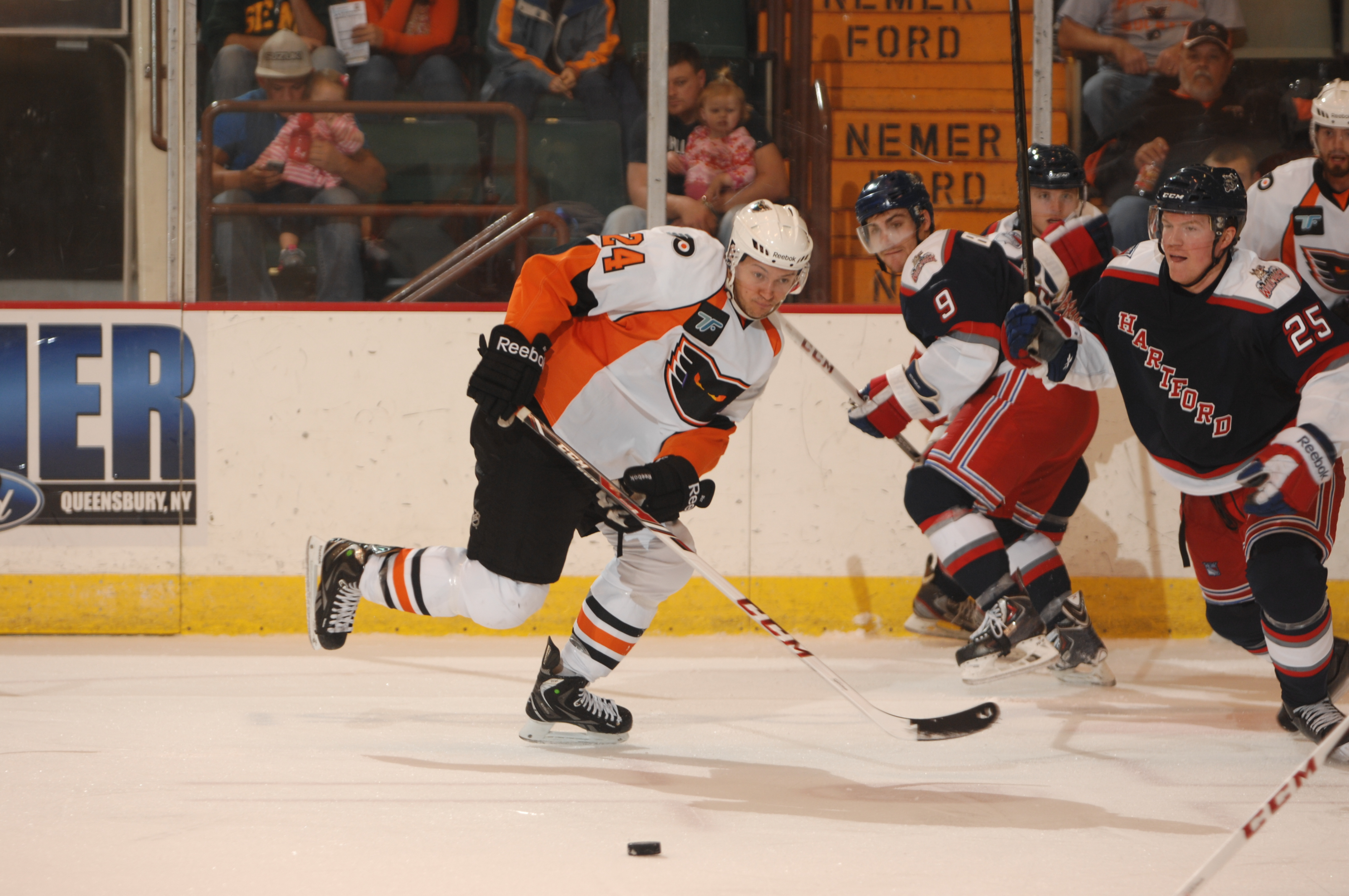
Danny Syvret played three seasons for the Phantoms.

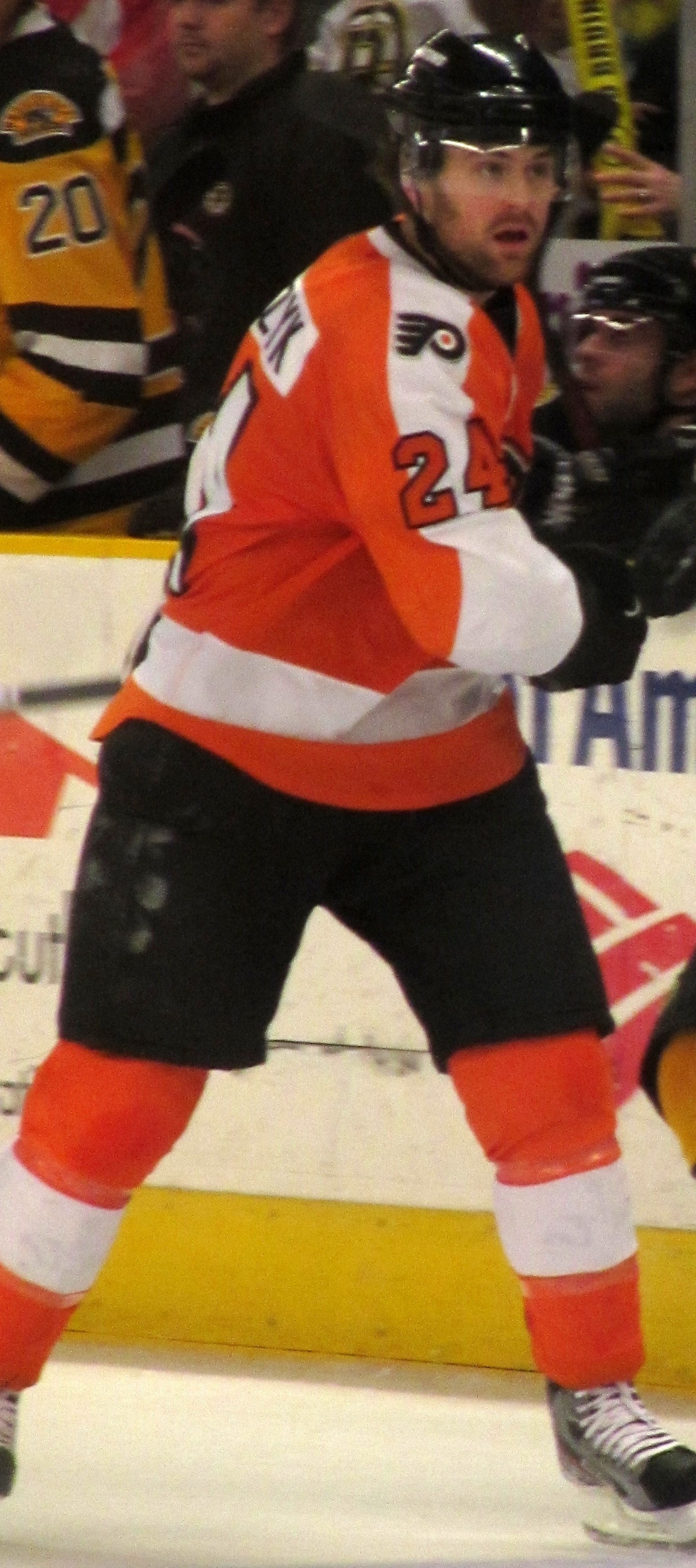
Harry Zolnierczyk played three seasons for the Phantoms.

== Notes ==
- ^{a} The seasons column lists the first year of the season of the player's first game and the last year of the season of the player's last game. For example, a player who played one game in the 2000–01 season would be listed as playing with the team from 2000–2001, regardless of what calendar year the game occurred within.

== See also ==
- List of Philadelphia Phantoms players
- List of Lehigh Valley Phantoms players
