= Sean Curry =

American ice hockey player (born 1982)

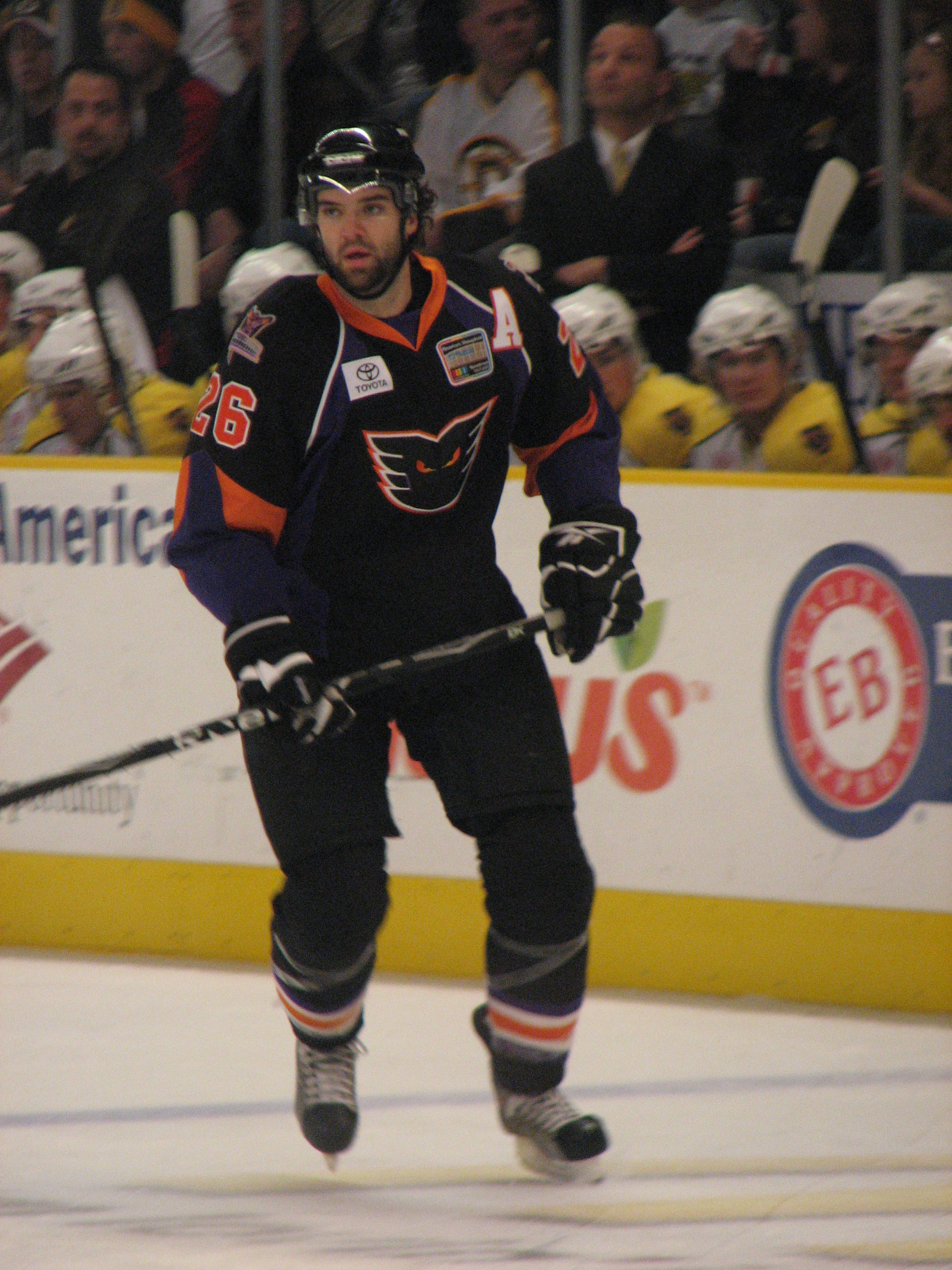
- Born: April 29, 1982 (age 43) Burnsville, Minnesota, U.S.
- Height: 6 ft 5 in (196 cm)
- Weight: 227 lb (103 kg; 16 st 3 lb)
- Position: Defense
- Shot: Right
- Played for: Lowell Lock Monsters; Providence Bruins; Philadelphia Phantoms; Adirondack Phantoms; Hamburg Freezers; Rögle BK; Alaska Aces
- NHL draft: 211th overall, 2001; Carolina Hurricanes
- Playing career: 2002–2014

Sean Curry (born April 29, 1982) is an American former professional ice hockey defenseman. He has previously played in Europe for the Hamburg Freezers of the Deutsche Eishockey Liga during the 2010–11 season. The following season he moved to Sweden to play with Rögle BK in the HockeyAllsvenskan (2nd division). Following his stint in Europe, Curry returned to the United States and spent two seasons playing for the Alaska Aces in the ECHL. On September 25, 2014, Curry announced that he had retired from playing professionally.

== Career statistics ==
			Regular season					Playoffs
Season	Team	League	GP	G	A	Pts	PIM	GP	G	A	Pts	PIM
2000–01	Tri–City Americans	WHL	72	5	12	17	113	—	—	—	—	—
2001–02	Tri–City Americans	WHL	36	6	6	12	84	—	—	—	—	—
2001–02	Medicine Hat Tigers	WHL	24	4	13	17	43	—	—	—	—	—
2002–03	Lowell Lock Monsters	AHL	35	0	2	2	62	—	—	—	—	—
2002–03	Florida Everblades	ECHL	32	1	6	7	77	1	0	0	0	0
2003–04	Lowell Lock Monsters	AHL	74	1	8	9	66	—	—	—	—	—
2004–05	Lowell Lock Monsters	AHL	61	2	7	9	103	7	0	1	1	4
2005–06	Providence Bruins	AHL	72	4	4	8	144	6	0	1	1	20
2006–07	Providence Bruins	AHL	64	5	8	13	122	13	2	9	11	28
2007–08	Providence Bruins	AHL	72	13	25	38	139	10	0	4	4	27
2008–09	Philadelphia Phantoms	AHL	80	5	13	18	72	4	0	0	0	2
2009–10	Adirondack Phantoms	AHL	67	4	7	11	73	—	—	—	—	—
2010–11	Toledo Walleye	ECHL	2	0	0	0	2	—	—	—	—	—
2010–11	Hamburg Freezers	DEL	34	0	6	6	24	—	—	—	—	—
2011–12	Rögle BK	Allsv	48	5	8	13	109	10	1	2	3	35
2012–13	Alaska Aces	ECHL	53	7	11	18	75	11	0	2	2	13
2013–14	Alaska Aces	ECHL	33	2	6	8	42	20	2	4	6	18
AHL totals			525	34	74	108	781	40	2	15	17	81
