= Bruno Gervais =

Canadian ice hockey player (born 1984)

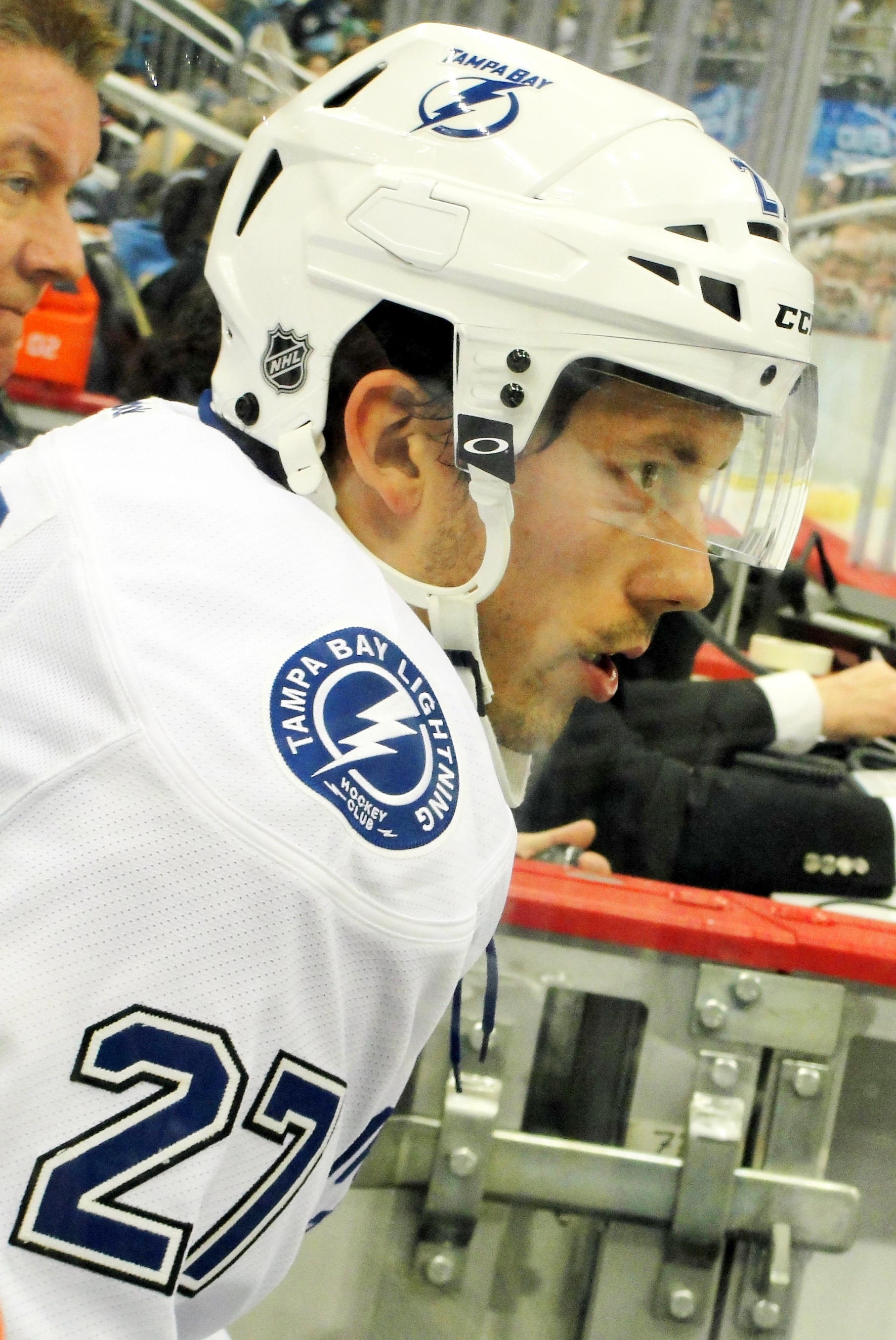
- Gervais with the Tampa Bay Lightning in 2012.
- Born: October 3, 1984 (age 41) Longueuil, Quebec, Canada
- Height: 6 ft 0 in (183 cm)
- Weight: 188 lb (85 kg; 13 st 6 lb)
- Position: Defence
- Shot: Right
- Played for: New York Islanders; Tampa Bay Lightning; Philadelphia Flyers; Eisbären Berlin
- NHL draft: 182nd overall, 2003; New York Islanders
- Playing career: 2004–2017

Bruno Gervais (born October 3, 1984) is a Canadian former professional ice hockey defenceman. He played with the New York Islanders, Tampa Bay Lightning and the Philadelphia Flyers in the National Hockey League (NHL).

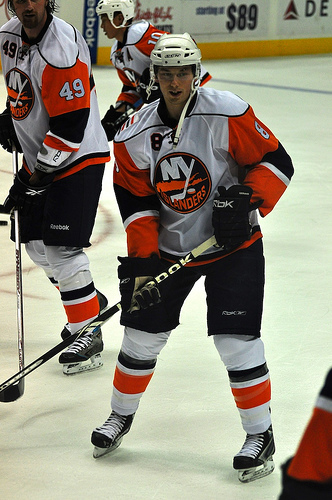
Gervais with the New York Islanders.

== Playing career ==
As a youth, Gervais played in the 1997 Quebec International Pee-Wee Hockey Tournament with the Richelieu Laser minor ice hockey team.

Gervais was selected in the sixth round of the 2003 NHL entry draft, 182nd overall, by the New York Islanders. Gervais was named captain of the Acadie-Bathurst Titan of the QMJHL as an 18-year-old even though there were many veteran players. In his 19-year-old season he hurt his knee at the December tryout camp for team Canada's under 20 team. He missed the rest of the season.

After scoring a career high 19 points in 63 games with the Islanders in the 2008–09 season, he was selected as the Nassau County Athlete of the Year Award in 2009.

On June 25, 2011, he was traded after 7 seasons within the Islanders organization to the Tampa Bay Lightning for future considerations. Two days later Gervais was signed by Tampa Bay to a one-year contract. He played in 50 games during 2011–12 season with the Lightning, scoring a career high 6 goals.

After one season in Tampa Bay, Gervais signed a two-year contract as a free agent worth $1.65 million with the Philadelphia Flyers. Viewed as a depth defenseman, and after a short stint with heilbronner Falken of the German 2nd Bundesliga, he filled in as the Flyers' sixth blue liner in the lockout shortened 2012–13 season.

In the second year of his contract with the Flyers, Gervais failed to make the team out of training camp. After clearing waivers he was assigned to AHL affiliate, the Adirondack Phantoms, for the duration of the 2013–14 season. In 59 games he led the Phantoms on the Blueline with 10 goals and 26 points.

On July 1, 2014, he was signed as a free agent to a one-year, two-way contract with the Colorado Avalanche. In the 2014–15 season, Gervais was assigned to AHL affiliate, the Lake Erie Monsters. As a veteran and older statesman of the club, Gervais was selected as team captain. In 71 contests with the Monsters, he produced 13 points from the blueline, but was unable to lead the Monsters to the post-season.

On July 6, 2015, Gervais opted to return for a second attempt in Germany, securing a one-year contract as a free agent with DEL club, Eisbären Berlin. Gervais remained in Berlin for two seasons, before announcing his retirement from his 13-year professional hockey career on July 13, 2017.

== Personal ==
He has a brother, Maxime, who played 8 games for the Cape Breton Screaming Eagles in the QMJHL before playing semi-professionally within Quebec. Gervais is the childhood best friend of fellow player Max Talbot whom he met while playing minor hockey in Quebec.

== Career statistics ==
			Regular season					Playoffs
Season	Team	League	GP	G	A	Pts	PIM	GP	G	A	Pts	PIM
1999–2000	Collège Antoine–Girouard	QMAAA	6	0	0	0	0	4	0	0	0	0
2000–01	Collège Antoine–Girouard	QMAAA	40	8	27	35	46	7	4	2	6	8
2001–02	Acadie–Bathurst Titan	QMJHL	65	4	12	16	42	10	3	1	4	6
2002–03	Acadie–Bathurst Titan	QMJHL	72	22	28	50	73	11	3	5	8	14
2003–04	Acadie–Bathurst Titan	QMJHL	23	4	6	10	28	—	—	—	—	—
2004–05	Bridgeport Sound Tigers	AHL	76	8	22	30	58	—	—	—	—	—
2005–06	Bridgeport Sound Tigers	AHL	55	16	25	41	70	7	1	2	3	0
2005–06	New York Islanders	NHL	27	3	4	7	8	—	—	—	—	—
2006–07	New York Islanders	NHL	51	0	6	6	28	5	1	1	2	2
2006–07	Bridgeport Sound Tigers	AHL	3	0	0	0	6	—	—	—	—	—
2007–08	New York Islanders	NHL	60	0	13	13	34	—	—	—	—	—
2008–09	New York Islanders	NHL	69	3	16	19	33	—	—	—	—	—
2009–10	New York Islanders	NHL	71	3	14	17	31	—	—	—	—	—
2010–11	New York Islanders	NHL	53	0	6	6	30	—	—	—	—	—
2011–12	Tampa Bay Lightning	NHL	50	6	7	13	8	—	—	—	—	—
2012–13	Heilbronner Falken	2.GBun	9	0	3	3	18	—	—	—	—	—
2012–13	Philadelphia Flyers	NHL	37	1	5	6	10	—	—	—	—	—
2013–14	Adirondack Phantoms	AHL	59	10	16	26	24	—	—	—	—	—
2014–15	Lake Erie Monsters	AHL	71	3	10	13	26	—	—	—	—	—
2015–16	Eisbären Berlin	DEL	31	8	11	19	14	—	—	—	—	—
2016–17	Eisbären Berlin	DEL	43	4	7	11	32	14	1	4	5	14
AHL totals			264	38	73	111	184	7	1	2	3	0
NHL totals			418	16	71	87	182	5	1	1	2	2
