= Jon Kalinski =

Canadian ice hockey player

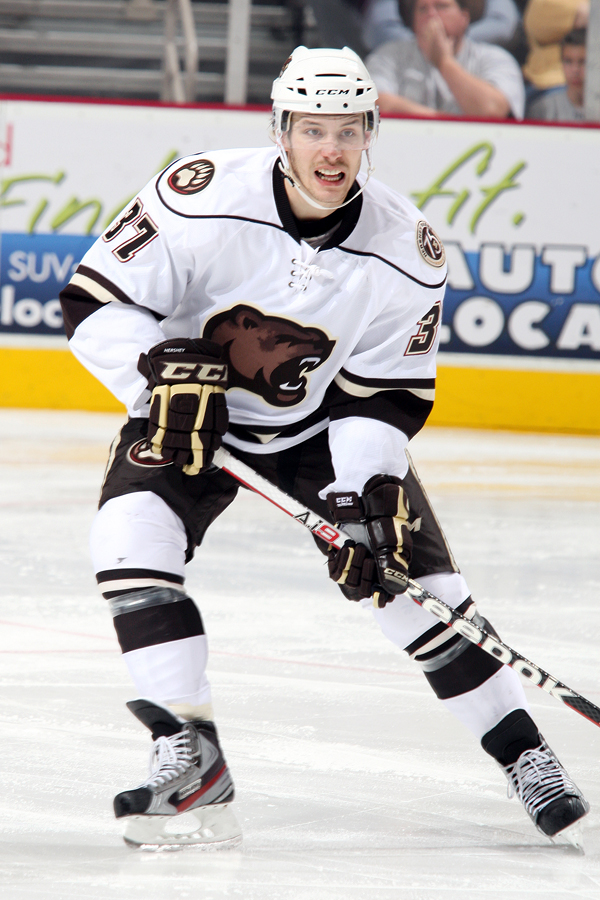
- Kalinski with the Hershey Bears in 2012
- Born: May 25, 1987 (age 39) Bonnyville, Alberta, Canada
- Height: 6 ft 1 in (185 cm)
- Weight: 175 lb (79 kg; 12 st 7 lb)
- Position: Left wing
- Shot: Left
- Played for: Philadelphia Flyers
- NHL draft: 152nd overall, 2007; Philadelphia Flyers
- Playing career: 2008–2013

Jonathon Brent Kalinski (born May 25, 1987) is a former Canadian professional ice hockey left winger who played parts of two National Hockey League (NHL) seasons as a member of the Philadelphia Flyers.

== Playing career ==
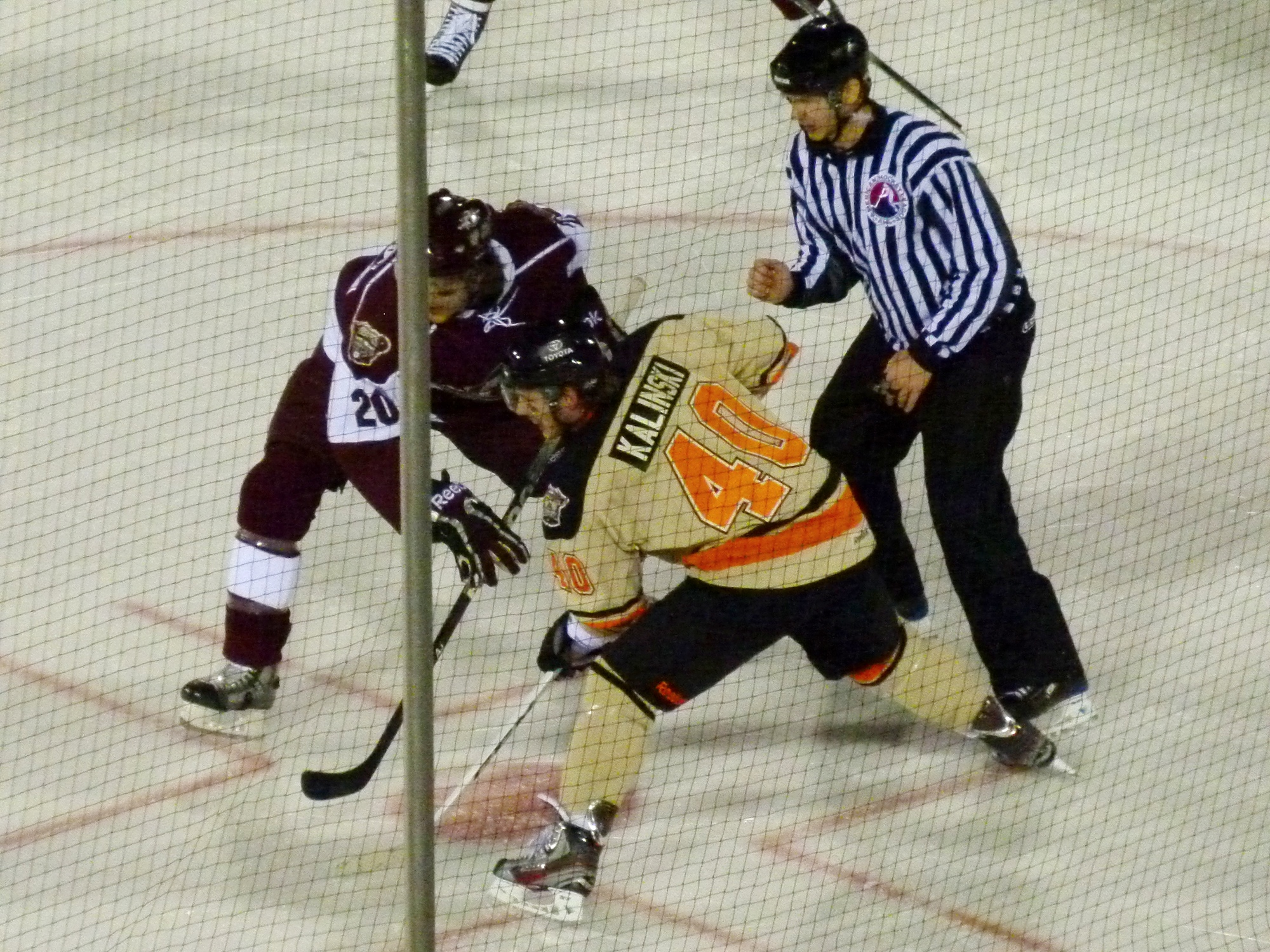
Kalinski takes a face-off during the 2012 AHL Outdoor Classic

The Philadelphia Flyers selected Kalinski in the sixth round, 152nd overall, of the 2007 NHL entry draft. Kalinski scored his first NHL goal on December 30, 2008, against Cory Schneider of the Vancouver Canucks.

On July 20, 2011, the Flyers announced they reached an agreement with Kalinski on a one-year contract extension. During the 2011-12 season, Kalinski was traded from the Flyers to the Tampa Bay Lightning, along with a 2012 or 2013 2nd-round pick and a 2013 4th-round pick, for Pavel Kubina on February 18, 2012.

On September 18, 2012, with the NHL lockout affecting his NHL interest as a free agent, Kalinski signed a one-year AHL contract with the Hershey Bears.

== Career statistics ==
			Regular season					Playoffs
Season	Team	League	GP	G	A	Pts	PIM	GP	G	A	Pts	PIM
2003–04	Bonnyville Pontiacs	AJHL	52	13	13	26	68	5	0	0	0	8
2004–05	Bonnyville Pontiacs	AJHL	58	16	25	41	195	4	2	0	2	6
2005–06	Minnesota State University, Mankato	WCHA	30	4	7	11	73	—	—	—	—	—
2006–07	Minnesota State University, Mankato	WCHA	37	17	10	27	74	—	—	—	—	—
2007–08	Minnesota State University, Mankato	WCHA	39	8	10	18	56	—	—	—	—	—
2007–08	Philadelphia Phantoms	AHL	5	0	3	3	4	10	1	2	3	14
2008–09	Philadelphia Phantoms	AHL	46	10	7	17	49	4	1	2	3	4
2008–09	Philadelphia Flyers	NHL	12	1	2	3	0	—	—	—	—	—
2009–10	Adirondack Phantoms	AHL	69	10	18	28	29	—	—	—	—	—
2009–10	Philadelphia Flyers	NHL	10	0	2	2	0	—	—	—	—	—
2010–11	Adirondack Phantoms	AHL	73	6	17	23	86	—	—	—	—	—
2011–12	Adirondack Phantoms	AHL	40	9	3	12	18	—	—	—	—	—
2011–12	Norfolk Admirals	AHL	5	0	0	0	2	—	—	—	—	—
2012–13	Hershey Bears	AHL	27	1	5	6	23	—	—	—	—	—
AHL totals			265	36	53	89	211	14	2	4	6	18
NHL totals			22	1	4	5	0	—	—	—	—	—
