= Cullen Eddy =

American ice hockey player

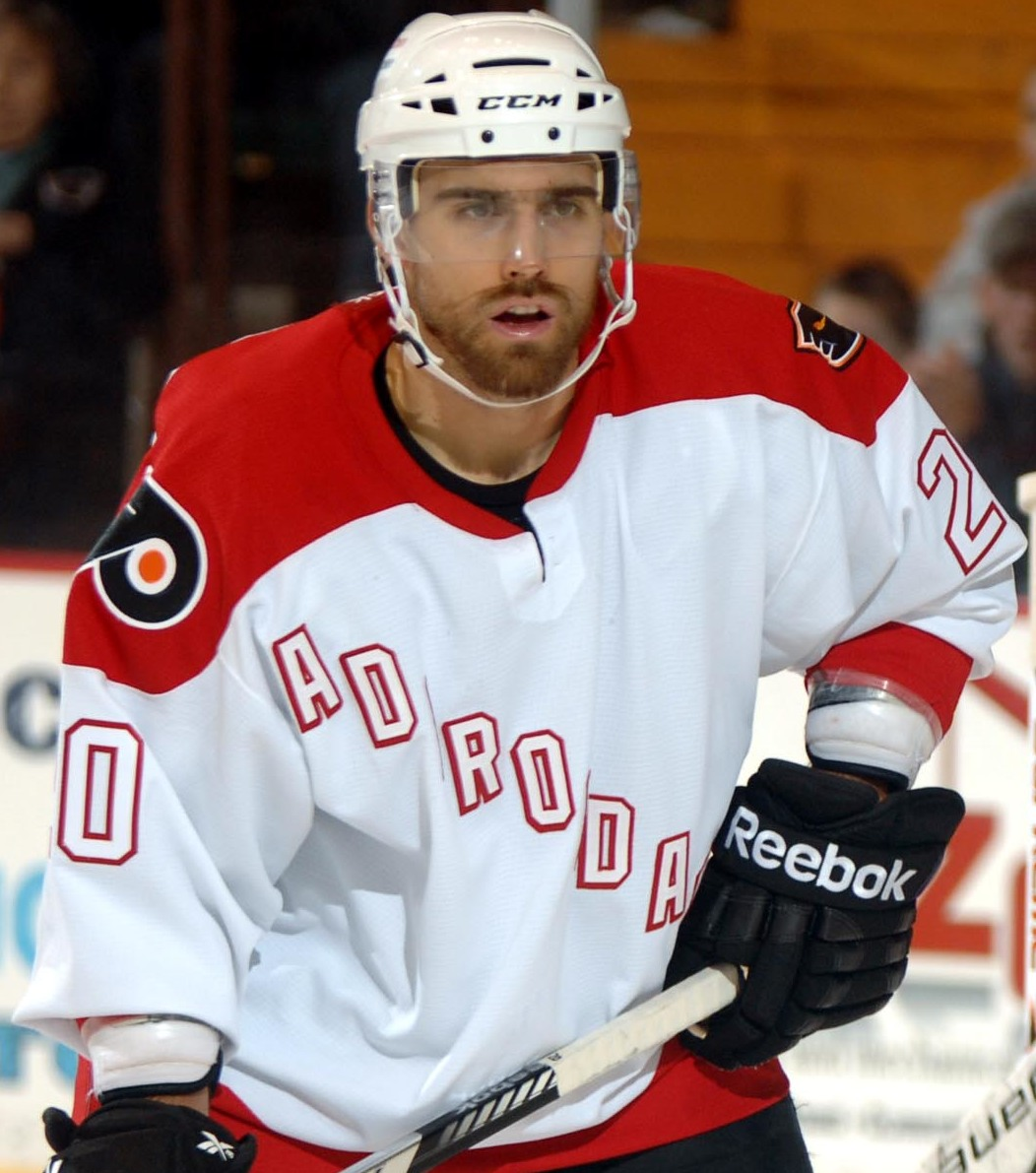
- Eddy with the Adirondack Phantoms in 2012
- Born: November 18, 1988 (age 37) Hidden Valley, Pennsylvania, USA
- Height: 6 ft 0 in (183 cm)
- Weight: 196 lb (89 kg; 14 st 0 lb)
- Position: Defense
- Shot: Right
- Played for: Adirondack Phantoms; Sheffield Steelers
- NHL draft: Undrafted
- Playing career: 2010–2016

Cullen Eddy (born November 18, 1988) is an American former professional ice hockey defenseman who played in the American Hockey League (AHL) and the British Elite Ice Hockey League (EIHL).

== Playing career ==
On August 3, 2011, it was announced that Eddy had re-signed with the Adirondack Phantoms. Eddy was signed to a two-year entry-level contract by the Philadelphia Flyers on July 3, 2012.

On August 7, 2014, Eddy signed a two-year contract with the Sheffield Steelers. Eddy announced his retirement from hockey after being part of two EIHL championship seasons with Sheffield.

== Career statistics ==
			Regular season					Playoffs
Season	Team	League	GP	G	A	Pts	PIM	GP	G	A	Pts	PIM
2006–07	Mercyhurst Lakers	AHA	35	5	11	16	62	—	—	—	—	—
2007–08	Mercyhurst Lakers	AHA	41	2	10	12	70	—	—	—	—	—
2008–09	Mercyhurst Lakers	AHA	38	1	14	15	93	—	—	—	—	—
2009–10	Mercyhurst Lakers	AHA	30	1	5	6	97	—	—	—	—	—
2009–10	Cincinnati Cyclones	ECHL	7	0	1	1	6	8	0	0	0	6
2010–11	Greenville Road Warriors	ECHL	16	1	3	4	26	—	—	—	—	—
2010–11	Adirondack Phantoms	AHL	47	3	7	10	40	—	—	—	—	—
2011–12	Adirondack Phantoms	AHL	54	2	13	15	130	—	—	—	—	—
2011–12	Greenville Road Warriors	ECHL	15	4	10	14	21	—	—	—	—	—
2012–13	Adirondack Phantoms	AHL	70	2	3	5	120	—	—	—	—	—
2013–14	Adirondack Phantoms	AHL	47	1	5	6	72	—	—	—	—	—
2014–15	Sheffield Steelers	EIHL	50	6	24	30	111	4	0	3	3	2
2015–16	Sheffield Steelers	EIHL	52	6	20	26	76	2	0	0	0	12
AHL totals			218	8	28	36	362	—	—	—	—	—

== Awards and honors ==
Award	Year
All-Atlantic Hockey Rookie Team	2006–07
