= Dan Jancevski =

Macedonian-Canadian ice hockey player

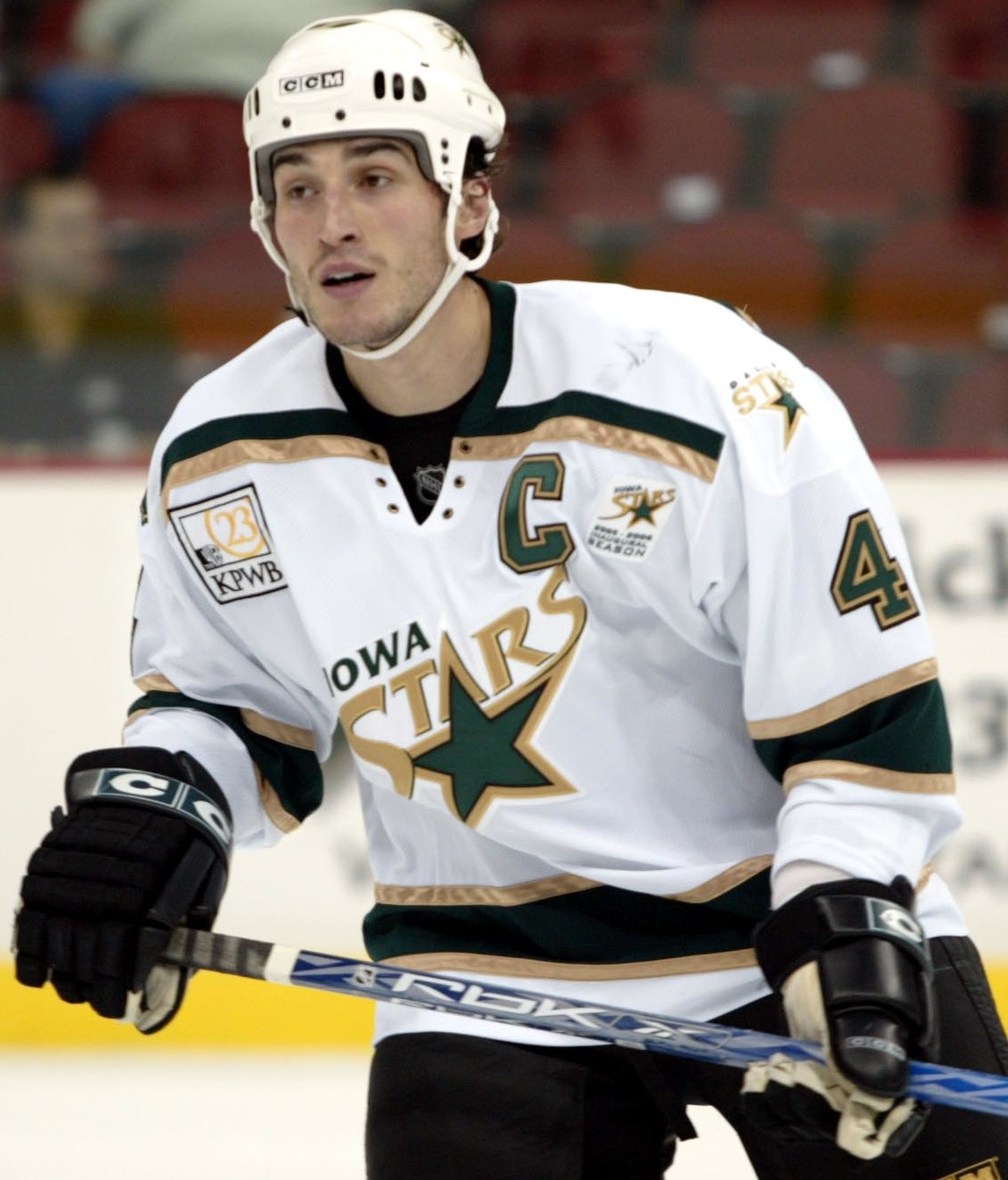
- Jancevski with the Iowa Stars in 2005
- Born: June 15, 1981 (age 45) Windsor, Ontario, Canada
- Height: 6 ft 3 in (191 cm)
- Weight: 222 lb (101 kg; 15 st 12 lb)
- Position: Defence
- Shot: Left
- Played for: Dallas Stars; Tampa Bay Lightning
- NHL draft: 66th overall, 1999; Dallas Stars
- Playing career: 2001–2012

Dan Jancevski (born June 15, 1981) is a Macedonian Canadian former professional ice hockey defenceman who played eleven seasons in the American Hockey League (AHL) and also in nine National Hockey League (NHL) games with the Dallas Stars and Tampa Bay Lightning.

== Playing career ==
Jancevski was drafted 66th overall in the 2nd round of the 1999 NHL entry draft by the Dallas Stars. In 2006, he signed with Montreal as a free agent; he was then assigned to the Canadiens' AHL affiliate, the Hamilton Bulldogs, where he helped the Bulldogs to the Calder Cup.

Jancevski signed a one-year deal with the Tampa Bay Lightning on July 6, 2007. He started the 2007-08 season with the Lightning's affiliate, the Norfolk Admirals. He received his first recall on November 21, 2007 and played in 2 games before he was returned to the Admirals. Jancevski was then traded back to Dallas for Junior Lessard on January 15, 2008.

On June 9, 2008, Jancevski was re-signed by the Stars to a two-year contract.

On July 15, 2010, Jancevski was signed by the Philadelphia Flyers to a two-year, two-way contract. He retired following the 2011–12 season.

== Awards and achievements ==
- 2006-07 AHL Calder Cup (Hamilton Bulldogs)

== Career statistics ==
			Regular season					Playoffs
Season	Team	League	GP	G	A	Pts	PIM	GP	G	A	Pts	PIM
1998–99	London Knights	OHL	68	2	12	14	115	25	1	7	8	24
1999–00	London Knights	OHL	59	8	15	23	138	—	—	—	—	—
2000–01	London Knights	OHL	39	4	23	27	95	—	—	—	—	—
2000–01	Sudbury Wolves	OHL	31	3	14	17	42	12	0	9	9	17
2001–02	Utah Grizzlies	AHL	77	0	13	13	147	5	0	0	0	4
2002–03	Utah Grizzlies	AHL	76	1	10	11	172	2	0	1	1	12
2003–04	Utah Grizzlies	AHL	80	5	17	22	171	—	—	—	—	—
2004–05	Hamilton Bulldogs	AHL	80	6	20	26	163	4	0	0	0	2
2005–06	Iowa Stars	AHL	77	9	29	38	91	7	1	1	2	6
2005–06	Dallas Stars	NHL	2	0	0	0	0	—	—	—	—	—
2006–07	Hamilton Bulldogs	AHL	80	7	24	31	87	22	3	11	14	16
2007–08	Norfolk Admirals	AHL	37	4	16	20	52	—	—	—	—	—
2007–08	Tampa Bay Lightning	NHL	2	0	0	0	2	—	—	—	—	—
2007–08	Iowa Stars	AHL	33	3	7	10	36	—	—	—	—	—
2007–08	Dallas Stars	NHL	2	0	0	0	0	—	—	—	—	—
2008–09	Hamilton Bulldogs	AHL	76	1	27	28	76	6	0	3	3	6
2008–09	Dallas Stars	NHL	3	0	0	0	0	—	—	—	—	—
2009–10	Texas Stars	AHL	78	3	20	23	71	24	1	11	12	20
2010–11	Adirondack Phantoms	AHL	75	0	15	15	34	—	—	—	—	—
2011–12	Adirondack Phantoms	AHL	75	3	11	14	53	—	—	—	—	—
NHL totals			9	0	0	0	2	—	—	—	—	—
AHL totals			844	42	209	251	1153	70	5	27	32	66
