= Ben Holmstrom =

American ice hockey player (born 1987)

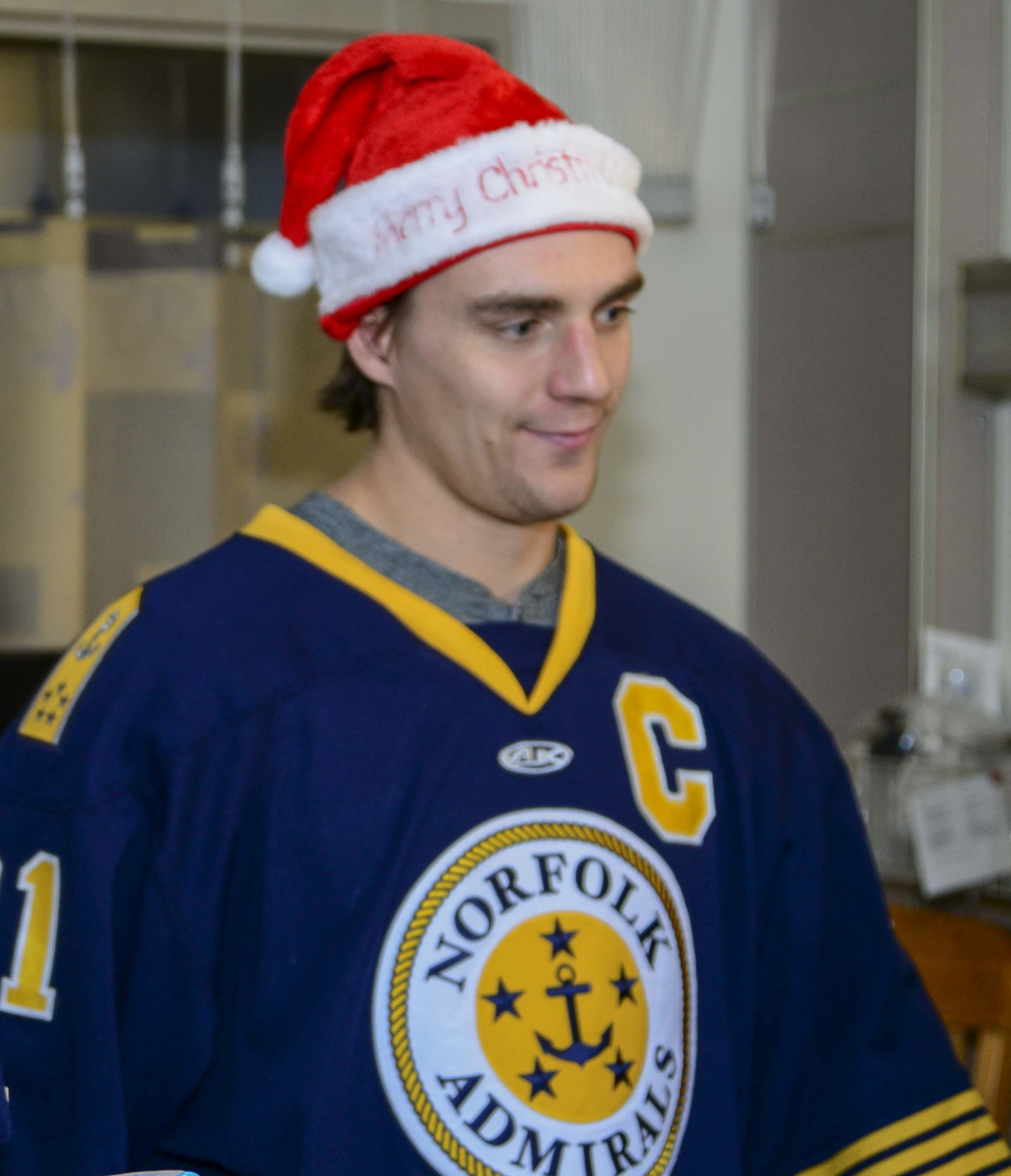
- Holmstrom with the Norfolk Admirals in 2019
- Born: April 9, 1987 (age 39) Colorado Springs, Colorado, U.S.
- Height: 6 ft 1 in (185 cm)
- Weight: 197 lb (89 kg; 14 st 1 lb)
- Position: Center
- Shot: Right
- Played for: Philadelphia Flyers; Adirondack Phantoms; Charlotte Checkers; Bridgeport Sound Tigers; Norfolk Admirals; Cincinnati Cyclones; Lillehammer IK; South Carolina Stingrays; Rochester Americans
- NHL draft: Undrafted
- Playing career: 2010–2022

Benjamin Scott Holmstrom (born April 9, 1987) is an American former professional ice hockey center. He played 7 National Hockey League (NHL) games with the Philadelphia Flyers. He previously captained the Adirondack Phantoms and Bridgeport Sound Tigers in the American Hockey League (AHL).

== Playing career ==
Undrafted, Holmstrom signed a two-year entry-level contract with the Philadelphia Flyers on March 17, 2010, after playing four seasons of collegiate hockey with UMass Lowell. Holmstrom was called up on March 3, 2011, and made his NHL debut against the Toronto Maple Leafs.

On July 3, 2014, Holmstrom left the Flyers organization after four years to sign a free agent contract with the Carolina Hurricanes. Holmstrom was assigned to AHL affiliate, the Charlotte Checkers for the duration of the 2014–15 season, contributing with 20 points in 62 games, as the Checkers missed the post-season.

On July 2, 2015, Holmstrom signed as a free agent to a one-year, two-way contract with the New York Islanders. After two seasons under contract with the Islanders, Holmstrom opted to continue within the organization in signing for his third season with the Bridgeport Sound Tigers on an AHL deal on October 4, 2017.

After leading the Sound Tigers for four seasons, Holmstrom left the club as a free agent at the conclusion of the 2018–19 season. On August 27, 2019, Holmstrom agreed to continue his career, signing a one-year contract with the Norfolk Admirals of the ECHL. During the 2019–20 season after collecting 19 points in 42 games, Holmstrom was traded by the Admirals to the Cincinnati Cyclones.

As a free agent in the off-season, Holmstrom approaching his 12th professional season opted to sign abroad by agreeing to a one-year contract with Norwegian club, Lillehammer IK of the Eliteserien on June 16, 2020. In his lone season in Norway in 2020–21, Holmstrom added a scoring presence to the Lillehammer forward group, adding 6 goals and 19 points in 23 regular season games.

Holmstrom opted to return to North America following the season, agreeing to continue his career in the ECHL with the South Carolina Stingrays on August 13, 2021. After 38 games with the Stingrays, Holmstrom was signed to a professional tryout contract in a return to the AHL with the Rochester Americans. On April 6, 2022, Holmstrom was given an 8-game suspension for using a homophobic slur against another player in a game against the Utica Comets on March 30.

In July 2022, Holmstrom joined the Orlando Solar Bears of the ECHL as an assistant coach, effectively ending his playing career.

== Personal ==
Holmstrom's brother, Josh, was a teammate with the Sound Tigers.

== Career statistics ==
			Regular season					Playoffs
Season	Team	League	GP	G	A	Pts	PIM	GP	G	A	Pts	PIM
2003–04	Sioux Falls Stampede	USHL	54	3	5	8	53	—	—	—	—	—
2004–05	Sioux Falls Stampede	USHL	15	1	0	1	10	—	—	—	—	—
2005–06	Sioux Falls Stampede	USHL	56	10	9	19	115	14	3	3	6	22
2006–07	UMass Lowell River Hawks	HE	30	4	9	13	18	—	—	—	—	—
2007–08	UMass Lowell River Hawks	HE	37	7	20	27	62	—	—	—	—	—
2008–09	UMass Lowell River Hawks	HE	38	6	15	21	52	—	—	—	—	—
2009–10	UMass Lowell River Hawks	HE	39	9	14	23	69	—	—	—	—	—
2009–10	Adirondack Phantoms	AHL	13	3	0	3	9	—	—	—	—	—
2010–11	Adirondack Phantoms	AHL	79	16	22	38	75	—	—	—	—	—
2010–11	Philadelphia Flyers	NHL	2	0	0	0	5	—	—	—	—	—
2011–12	Adirondack Phantoms	AHL	67	15	26	41	134	—	—	—	—	—
2011–12	Philadelphia Flyers	NHL	5	0	0	0	2	—	—	—	—	—
2012–13	Adirondack Phantoms	AHL	22	2	6	8	29	—	—	—	—	—
2013–14	Adirondack Phantoms	AHL	75	13	19	32	146	—	—	—	—	—
2014–15	Charlotte Checkers	AHL	62	5	15	20	92	—	—	—	—	—
2015–16	Bridgeport Sound Tigers	AHL	76	4	20	24	138	3	0	0	0	0
2016–17	Bridgeport Sound Tigers	AHL	76	7	9	16	91	—	—	—	—	—
2017–18	Bridgeport Sound Tigers	AHL	76	11	10	21	101	—	—	—	—	—
2018–19	Bridgeport Sound Tigers	AHL	40	3	5	8	25	—	—	—	—	—
2019–20	Norfolk Admirals	ECHL	42	9	10	19	61	—	—	—	—	—
2019–20	Cincinnati Cyclones	ECHL	9	0	4	4	2	—	—	—	—	—
2020–21	Lillehammer IK	NOR	23	6	13	19	24	—	—	—	—	—
2021–22	South Carolina Stingrays	ECHL	38	5	14	19	49	—	—	—	—	—
2021–22	Rochester Americans	AHL	25	0	6	6	19	2	0	0	0	16
NHL totals			7	0	0	0	7	—	—	—	—	—

== Awards and honors ==
Award	Year
College
HE Best Defensive Forward	2009–10

Awards and achievements
Preceded by Joe Vitale	Hockey East Best Defensive Forward; 2009–10	Succeeded by Tanner House
