= Adirondack Phantoms =

- City: Glens Falls, New York
- League: American Hockey League
- Operated: 2009–2014
- Home arena: Glens Falls Civic Center
- Colors: Orange, black, purple, white
- Media: Classic Hits Q101.7 FM
- Affiliates: Philadelphia Flyers (NHL)

Franchise history
- 1996–2009: Philadelphia Phantoms
- 2009–2014: Adirondack Phantoms
- 2014–present: Lehigh Valley Phantoms

The Adirondack Phantoms were a professional ice hockey team in the American Hockey League (AHL), who began play in the 2009–10 AHL season. The Phantoms were based in Glens Falls, New York, playing home games at the Glens Falls Civic Center and were the AHL affiliate of the NHL's Philadelphia Flyers. The franchise moved to Glens Falls from Philadelphia, where they were known as the Philadelphia Phantoms from 1996 to 2009 in the Flyers' former arena, the Spectrum.

Beginning in the 2014–15 season, the team moved to Allentown, Pennsylvania, and are now known as the Lehigh Valley Phantoms.

== History ==
In 2008, Comcast Spectacor announced that the Wachovia Spectrum, the Phantoms' home since 1996, was going to be demolished to make way for Philly LIVE, a project which included a luxury hotel and entertainment district. On February 4, 2009, it was announced that Comcast Spectacor has reached an agreement to sell the Phantoms to the Brooks Group of Pittsburgh. On April 28, 2009, it was announced by the AHL's board of governors that approval had been given for the Brooks Group to officially move the Phantoms to Glens Falls. The Phantoms would be the second American Hockey League team to play in Glens Falls, New York, after the Adirondack Red Wings from 1979 to 1999.

The franchise's current logo, since relocating to Lehigh Valley, Pennsylvania

On December 4, 2009, the Phantoms returned to Philadelphia to play a home game. The Phantoms lost 2–1 in overtime to the Norfolk Admirals at the Wachovia Center. The Phantoms played in Philadelphia again on January 21, 2011, against the Wilkes-Barre/Scranton Penguins at the Wells Fargo Center. The Phantoms won by a score of 4–2. The Phantoms returned to Philadelphia a third time on January 6, 2012, where they took part in the third annual AHL Outdoor Classic. They hosted the Hershey Bears at Citizens Bank Park, four days after the ballpark hosted the Flyers and New York Rangers in the NHL Winter Classic. This was the third outdoor AHL game, but the first to include the Phantoms who won 4–3 in overtime. It also marked the first time an outdoor AHL game was included in the Winter Classic festivities.

In March 2011, plans were announced for the PPL Center to be built in Allentown, Pennsylvania. The arena, located in downtown Allentown, takes up the entire block between Seventh and Eighth streets and Hamilton Boulevard and Linden Street. Demolition at the arena site began in January 2012. In February 2012, it was announced the Phantoms would return to Pennsylvania in 2013–14. However, due to construction delays on the new arena it was pushed back to 2014–15 and the franchise began play as the Lehigh Valley Phantoms.

== Season-by-season results ==
| Calder Cup champions | Conference champions | Division champions | League leader |

Records as of April 20, 2014.

| Regular season | | | | | | | | | | | Playoffs | | | | |
| Season | Games | Won | Lost | OTL | SOL | Points | PCT | Goals for | Goals against | Standing | Year | 1st round | 2nd round | 3rd round | Finals |
|---|---|---|---|---|---|---|---|---|---|---|---|---|---|---|---|
| 2009–10 | 80 | 32 | 41 | 3 | 4 | 71 | .444 | 199 | 251 | 7th, East | 2010 | Out of playoffs | | | |
| 2010–11 | 80 | 31 | 39 | 4 | 6 | 72 | .450 | 197 | 248 | 7th, East | 2011 | Out of playoffs | | | |
| 2011–12 | 76 | 37 | 35 | 2 | 2 | 78 | .513 | 204 | 217 | 3rd, Northeast | 2012 | Out of playoffs | | | |
| 2012–13 | 76 | 31 | 38 | 3 | 4 | 69 | .454 | 187 | 223 | 5th, Northeast | 2013 | Out of playoffs | | | |
| 2013–14 | 76 | 30 | 38 | 2 | 6 | 68 | .447 | 182 | 225 | 4th, Northeast | 2014 | Out of playoffs | | | |
| Totals | 388 | 161 | 191 | 14 | 22 | 358 | .461 | 969 | 1164 | | | 0 Playoff appearances | | | |

== Players ==
=== Team captains ===
- Jared Ross, 2009–10
- Dan Jancevski, 2010–11
- Ben Holmstrom, 2011–14

== Team records ==
=== Single season ===
Goals: Jon Matsumoto, 30 (2009–10)
Assists: Erik Gustafsson, 44 (2010–11)
Points: Jason Akeson, 64 (2013–14)
Penalty minutes: Zac Rinaldo, 331 (2010–11)
GAA: Michael Leighton, 2.22 (2010–11)
SV%: Michael Leighton, .926 (2010–11)
Wins: Michael Leighton, 28 (2011–12)
Shutouts: Michael Leighton, 5 (2010–11)

- Goaltending records need a minimum of 25 games played by the goaltender

=== Career ===
Career goals: Jason Akeson, 58
Career assists: Jason Akeson, 114
Career points: Jason Akeson, 172
Career penalty minutes: Brandon Manning, 447
Career goaltending wins: Michael Leighton, 43
Career shutouts: Michael Leighton, 7
Career games: Ben Holmstrom, 256

== Head coaches ==
- Greg Gilbert, 2009–10
- John Paddock, 2010
- Joe Paterson, 2010–12
- Terry Murray, 2012–14

== See also ==
- List of Adirondack Phantoms players
