= 2008–09 Los Angeles Kings season =

National Hockey League team season

2008–09 Los Angeles Kings
- Division: 5th Pacific
- Conference: 14th Western
- 2008–09 record: 34–37–11
- Home record: 18–15–8
- Road record: 16–22–3
- Goals for: 202
- Goals against: 226

Team information
- General manager: Dean Lombardi
- Coach: Terry Murray
- Captain: Dustin Brown
- Alternate captains: Matt Greene; Anze Kopitar
- Arena: Staples Center
- Average attendance: 16,489 (91.0%); Total: 676,042

Team leaders
- Goals: 32, Alexander Frolov
- Assists: 39, Anze Kopitar
- Points: 66, Anze Kopitar
- Penalty minutes: 145, Raitis Ivanans
- Plus/minus: +2, Sean O'Donnell
- Wins: 21, Jonathan Quick
- Goals against average: 2.48, Jonathan Quick

The 2008–09 Los Angeles Kings season was the 42nd season (41st season of play) for the National Hockey League (NHL) franchise. The Kings showed improvement while fielding the youngest team in the league (in terms of average age per player), but came up short of breaking a playoff drought that stretches back to the 2001–02 season.

Despite a tough schedule that saw them play 17 of their final 24 games away from the Staples Center, the Kings managed to stay in the playoff hunt for much of the year. They played in 43 games decided by one goal, and their record in these games was 20–12–11.

Alexander Frolov led the team in goals with 32, his fifth-consecutive season with at least 20 or more goals. The last King to post five consecutive season with over 20 goals was Luc Robitaille in the 1993–94 season. Moreover, defenseman Sean O'Donnell reached a milestone by playing in his 1,000th career NHL game on March 14.

== Pre-season ==
On June 10, the Kings fired Head Coach Marc Crawford after failing to make the post-season in back-to-back seasons. Crawford posted a 59–84–21 record during his tenure. He was replaced on July 17 by Terry Murray, who takes over his fourth NHL team. Murray had previously coached the Washington Capitals, Florida Panthers and Philadelphia Flyers, where he led the latter to the 1997 Stanley Cup Finals. Entering the season, Murray's career record is 360–288–89.

2008 Pre-season Game Log: 3–2–3 (Home: 2–1–2; Road: 1–1–1)
#	Date	Visitor	Score	Home	OT	Decision	Attendance	Record	Recap
1	September 22	St. Louis	1–2	Los Angeles		?	?	1–0–0
2	September 22	Phoenix	4–6	Los Angeles		Taylor	8,221	2–0–0
3	September 24	Los Angeles	4–3	Colorado	SO	Quick	?	3–0–0
4	September 27	Colorado	4–3	Los Angeles	SO	?	?	3–0–1
5	September 30	Anaheim	2–1	Los Angeles	SO	LaBarbera	11,904	3–0–2
6	October 1	Los Angeles	2–3	Anaheim	OT	Ersberg	16,410	3–0–3
7	October 4	Los Angeles	2–5	Phoenix		Quick	8,621	3–1–3
8	October 5	San Jose	3–1	Los Angeles		?	?	3–2–3

== Regular season ==
The Kings made great strides in the 2008–09 season. They went from 30th in the NHL a year prior in penalty killing to seventh-best in the league, with an 82.9% rating. They had the League's fourth-best faceoff win percentage and allowed the fourth-fewest shots on goal. Five players played in all 82 regular games: Anze Kopitar, Michal Handzus, Matt Greene, Sean O'Donnell and rookie Wayne Simmonds. Several surprises also emerged during the season.

Kyle Quincey was acquired via waivers shortly after season started from the Detroit Red Wings, necessitated by an injury to defenseman Jack Johnson. Quincey went on to finish second in the team in assists and averaged over 20 minutes of ice time per game. Drew Doughty, the second overall pick in the 2008 NHL entry draft, immediately contributed to the team, leading the Kings in ice time and was second in blocked shots. He finished in the top ten in the NHL in several categories, and was considered a strong Calder Memorial Trophy candidate for Rookie of the Year honors.

Another surprise was Jonathan Quick, who emerged as the team's number one goaltender. Quick was thrust into the line-up following the trade of Jason LaBarbera in mid-season to the Vancouver Canucks and due to an injury to Erik Ersberg. All Quick lead the team in every goaltending category, posting the third highest win total for a rookie in Kings history. He finished third in the league among rookie netminder in goals against average, and played in 22 of the final 27 and 41 of the final 52 Kings games He had a 1.76 goals-against average (16 GA in 546:03) and .942 save percentage (258 saves in 274 shots) in nine straight appearances from March 22 to April 9.

The Kings finished the regular season having been shut out 12 times, tying the Colorado Avalanche for the most times shut out.

The Western Conference remained a tight race throughout the season, and the Kings were not officially eliminated from the playoffs until two weeks remained in the season.

=== Divisional standings ===
Pacific Division
		GP	W	L	OTL	GF	GA	Pts
**1**	**p – San Jose Sharks**	**82**	**53**	**18**	**11**	**257**	**204**	**117**
**2**	**Anaheim Ducks**	**82**	**42**	**33**	**7**	**245**	**238**	**91**
3	Dallas Stars	82	36	35	11	230	257	83
4	Phoenix Coyotes	82	36	39	7	208	252	79
5	Los Angeles Kings	82	34	37	11	207	234	79

Note: No. = Division rank, CR = Conference rank, W = Wins, L = Losses, T = Ties, GF = Goals For, GA = Goals Against, Pts = Points
Teams that qualified for the playoffs are highlighted in bold.

=== Conference standings ===
Western Conference
R		Div	GP	W	L	OTL	GF	GA	Pts
**1**	**p – San Jose Sharks**	**PA**	**82**	**53**	**18**	**11**	**257**	**204**	117
**2**	**y – Detroit Red Wings**	**CE**	**82**	**51**	**21**	**10**	**295**	**244**	112
**3**	**y – Vancouver Canucks**	**NW**	**82**	**45**	**27**	**10**	**246**	**220**	100
**4**	**Chicago Blackhawks**	**CE**	**82**	**46**	**24**	**12**	**264**	**216**	104
**5**	**Calgary Flames**	**NW**	**82**	**46**	**30**	**6**	**254**	**248**	98
**6**	**St. Louis Blues**	**CE**	**82**	**41**	**31**	**10**	**233**	**233**	92
**7**	**Columbus Blue Jackets**	**CE**	**82**	**41**	**31**	**10**	**226**	**230**	92
**8**	**Anaheim Ducks**	**PA**	**82**	**42**	**33**	**7**	**245**	**238**	91
8.5
9	Minnesota Wild	NW	82	40	33	9	219	200	89
10	Nashville Predators	CE	82	40	34	8	213	233	88
11	Edmonton Oilers	NW	82	38	35	9	234	248	85
12	Dallas Stars	PA	82	36	35	11	230	257	83
13	Phoenix Coyotes	PA	82	36	39	7	208	252	79
14	Los Angeles Kings	PA	82	34	37	11	207	234	79
15	Colorado Avalanche	NW	82	32	45	5	199	257	69

bold – qualified for playoffs, y – division winner, p – Presidents' Trophy winner
CE – Central Division, NW – Northwest Division, PA – Pacific Division

== Schedule and results ==
2008–09 Game Log

October: 3–5–1 (Home: 2–3–1; Road: 1–2–0)
#	Date	Visitor	Score	Home	OT	Decision	Attendance	Record	Pts	Recap
1	October 11	Los Angeles	1–3	San Jose		LaBarbera	17,496	0–1–0	0
2	October 12	San Jose	1–0	Los Angeles		LaBarbera	18,118	0–2–0	0
3	October 14	Anaheim	3–6	Los Angeles		LaBarbera	14,451	1–2–0	2
4	October 17	Carolina	3–4	Los Angeles	OT	LaBarbera	14,194	2–2–0	4
5	October 20	Colorado	4–3	Los Angeles		LaBarbera	13,891	2–3–0	4
6	October 24	Los Angeles	4–0	St. Louis		LaBarbera	19,150	3–3–0	6
7	October 25	Los Angeles	4–5	Nashville		Ersberg	14,704	3–4–0	6
8	October 27	Detroit	4–3	Los Angeles	SO	LaBarbera	17,671	3–4–1	7
9	October 30	Vancouver	4–0	Los Angeles		LaBarbera	13,652	3–5–1	7

November: 7–4–2 (Home: 5–2–2; Road: 2–2–0)
#	Date	Visitor	Score	Home	OT	Decision	Attendance	Record	Pts	Recap
10	November 1	Calgary	3–2	Los Angeles		LaBarbera	16,279	3–6–1	7
11	November 4	Anaheim	1–0	Los Angeles	OT	Ersberg	14,327	3–6–2	8
12	November 6	Florida	2–3	Los Angeles		Ersberg	11,267	4–6–2	10
13	November 8	St. Louis	3–5	Los Angeles		Ersberg	17,182	5–6–2	12
14	November 11	Dallas	2–3	Los Angeles	SO	Ersberg	13,823	6–6–2	14
15	November 13	Los Angeles	3–2	Dallas		Ersberg	17,675	7–6–2	16
16	November 15	Nashville	3–1	Los Angeles		Ersberg	14,135	7–7–2	16
17	November 16	Los Angeles	0–2	Anaheim		Ersberg	17,174	7–8–2	16
18	November 20	Washington	2–5	Los Angeles		Ersberg	17,428	8–8–2	18
19	November 22	Colorado	4–3	Los Angeles	SO	Ersberg	18,118	8–8–3	19
20	November 25	Los Angeles	2–6	Calgary		Ersberg	19,289	8–9–3	19
21	November 26	Los Angeles	2–1	Edmonton		LaBarbera	16,839	9–9–3	21
22	November 29	Chicago	2–5	Los Angeles		Ersberg	16,147	10–9–3	23

December: 5–7–3 (Home: 3–3–3; Road: 2–4–0)
#	Date	Visitor	Score	Home	OT	Decision	Attendance	Record	Pts	Recap
23	December 1	Toronto	3–1	Los Angeles		LaBarbera	15,052	10–10–3	23
24	December 2	Los Angeles	2–4	Phoenix		Ersberg	11,473	10–11–3	23
25	December 5	Edmonton	5–4	Los Angeles	SO	LaBarbera	14,920	10–11–4	24
26	December 6	Columbus	0–3	Los Angeles		LaBarbera	15,235	11–11–4	26
27	December 9	Los Angeles	1–6	Colorado		LaBarbera	14,122	11–12–4	26
28	December 11	St. Louis	2–6	Los Angeles		Ersberg	13,851	12–12–4	28
29	December 13	Minnesota	1–3	Los Angeles		Ersberg	14,857	13–12–4	30
30	December 15	San Jose	3–2	Los Angeles	SO	LaBarbera	16,005	13–12–5	31
31	December 17	NY Rangers	3–2	Los Angeles	OT	LaBarbera	17,166	13–12–6	32
32	December 19	Los Angeles	0–5	Buffalo		LaBarbera	18,147	13–13–6	32
33	December 20	Los Angeles	4–6	Detroit		Quick	19,784	13–14–6	32
34	December 23	Los Angeles	3–0	Columbus		Quick	15,145	14–14–6	34
35	December 26	Phoenix	2–1	Los Angeles		Quick	18,118	14–15–6	34
36	December 27	Los Angeles	4–0	Phoenix		Quick	16,199	15–15–6	36
37	December 29	Columbus	2–0	Los Angeles		Quick	18,118	15–16–6	36

January: 5–5–1 (Home: 3–3–0; Road: 2–2–1)
#	Date	Visitor	Score	Home	OT	Decision	Attendance	Record	Pts	Recap
38	January 3	Philadelphia	1–2	Los Angeles	SO	Quick	18,118	16–16–6	38
39	January 6	Los Angeles	1–3	Anaheim		Ersberg	17,174	16–17–6	38
40	January 8	Anaheim	3–4	Los Angeles		Quick	18,118	17–17–6	40
41	January 10	New Jersey	5–1	Los Angeles		Quick	18,118	17–18–6	40
42	January 12	Tampa Bay	3–1	Los Angeles		Ersberg	16,511	17–19–6	40
43	January 15	Detroit	4–0	Los Angeles		Quick	18,118	17–20–6	40
44	January 17	Los Angeles	2–3	Dallas	SO	Ersberg	18,532	17–20–7	41
45	January 20	Los Angeles	5–2	Minnesota		Quick	18,568	18–20–7	43
46	January 21	Los Angeles	6–5	Colorado		Quick	13,289	19–20–7	45
47	January 29	Chicago	2–5	Los Angeles		Quick	18,118	20–20–7	47
48	January 31	Los Angeles	3–4	Montreal		Quick	21,273	20–21–7	47

February: 6–5–2 (Home: 0–2–2; Road: 6–3–0)
#	Date	Visitor	Score	Home	OT	Decision	Attendance	Record	Pts	Recap
49	February 3	Los Angeles	1–0	Ottawa		Quick	18,054	21–21–7	49
50	February 5	Los Angeles	5–4	Washington		Quick	18,277	22–21–7	51
51	February 7	Los Angeles	3–1	New Jersey		Quick	17,056	23–21–7	53
52	February 10	Los Angeles	4–3	NY Islanders	SO	Quick	12,330	24–21–7	55
53	February 12	Calgary	2–0	Los Angeles		Quick	17,286	24–22–7	55
54	February 14	Edmonton	3–2	Los Angeles	SO	Quick	18,118	24–22–8	56
55	February 16	Atlanta	7–6	Los Angeles	SO	Ersberg	18,118	24–22–9	57
56	February 18	Los Angeles	4–3	Anaheim		Quick	17,089	25–22–9	59
57	February 19	Los Angeles	2–4	San Jose		Ersberg	17,496	25–23–9	59
58	February 21	Phoenix	6–3	Los Angeles		Quick	17,177	25–24–9	59
59	February 24	Los Angeles	2–1	Minnesota	SO	Quick	18,568	26–24–9	61
60	February 25	Los Angeles	0–2	Philadelphia		Ersberg	19,568	26–25–9	61
61	February 27	Los Angeles	1–2	Detroit		Quick	20,066	26–26–9	61

March: 5–8–2 (Home: 3–2–0; Road: 2–6–2)
#	Date	Visitor	Score	Home	OT	Decision	Attendance	Record	Pts	Recap
62	March 1	Los Angeles	2–4	Chicago		Quick	21,386	26–27–9	61
63	March 3	Los Angeles	4–5	Columbus		Quick	15,049	26–28–9	61
64	March 5	Dallas	4–5	Los Angeles	OT	Quick	17,430	27–28–9	63
65	March 7	Minnesota	3–4	Los Angeles		Quick	18,118	28–28–9	65
66	March 9	Vancouver	2–3	Los Angeles		Quick	16,995	29–28–9	67
67	March 13	Los Angeles	2–4	Vancouver		Quick	18,630	29–29–9	67
68	March 14	Los Angeles	1–2	San Jose	SO	Ersberg	17,496	29–29–10	68
69	March 16	Nashville	4–3	Los Angeles		Ersberg	17,810	29–30–10	68
70	March 19	Los Angeles	3–2	Boston	OT	Quick	17,565	30–30–10	70
71	March 20	Los Angeles	1–4	Pittsburgh		Quick	17,132	30–31–10	70
72	March 22	Los Angeles	1–4	Chicago		Quick	21,629	30–32–10	70
73	March 24	Los Angeles	0–2	St. Louis		Quick	19,150	30–33–10	70
74	March 26	Los Angeles	1–0	Dallas	SO	Quick	16,908	31–33–10	72
75	March 28	Los Angeles	3–4	Nashville	OT	Quick	17,113	31–33–11	73
76	March 31	Dallas	3–2	Los Angeles		Quick	17,648	31–34–11	73

April: 3–3–0 (Home: 2–0–0; Road: 1–3–0)
#	Date	Visitor	Score	Home	OT	Decision	Attendance	Record	Pts	Recap
77	April 2	Los Angeles	1–2	Phoenix		Quick	13,117	31–35–11	73
78	April 4	Phoenix	1–6	Los Angeles		Quick	18,118	32–35–11	75
79	April 6	Los Angeles	1–4	Calgary		Ersberg	19,289	32–36–11	75
80	April 7	Los Angeles	2–1	Edmonton		Quick	16,839	33–36–11	77
81	April 9	Los Angeles	0–1	Vancouver		Quick	18,630	33–37–11	77
82	April 11	San Jose	3–4	Los Angeles		Quick	18,118	34–37–11	79

Legend: Win (2 points) Loss (0 points) Overtime/shootout loss (1 point)

== Player statistics ==
=== Skaters ===
Note: Pos = Position; GP = Games played; G = Goals; A = Assists; Pts = Points; PIM = Penalty minutes; +/- = Plus/minus; PPG = Power-play goals; SHG = Short-handed goals; GWG = Game-winning goals

Regular season

Player	GP	G	A	Pts	+/−	PIM
Anze Kopitar	82	27	39	66	−17	32
Alexander Frolov	77	32	27	59	−6	30
Dustin Brown	80	24	29	53	−15	64
Michal Handzus	82	18	24	42	−7	32
Jarret Stoll	74	18	23	41	−7	68
Kyle Quincey	72	4	34	38	−5	63
Patrick O'Sullivan^{‡}	62	14	23	37	+1	16
Kyle Calder	74	8	19	27	−1	41
Drew Doughty	81	6	21	27	−17	56
Wayne Simmonds	82	9	14	23	−8	73
Teddy Purcell	40	4	12	16	−4	4
Oscar Moller	40	7	8	15	−3	16
Matt Greene	82	2	12	14	+1	111
Sean O'Donnell	82	0	12	12	+2	71
Peter Harrold	69	4	8	12	−13	28
Jack Johnson	41	6	5	11	−18	46
Derek Armstrong	56	5	4	9	−11	63
Tom Preissing	22	3	4	7	−7	6
Brad Richardson	31	0	5	5	−6	11
Brian Boyle	28	4	1	5	−9	42
Denis Gauthier	65	2	2	4	−11	90
Justin Williams^{†}	12	1	3	4	+1	8
Trevor Lewis	6	1	2	3	0	0
Davis Drewiske	17	0	3	3	+1	18
Raitis Ivanans	76	2	0	2	−8	145
Matt Moulson	7	1	0	1	−4	2
John Zeiler	27	0	1	1	−2	42
Kevin Westgarth	9	0	0	0	+1	9

=== Goaltenders ===
Note: Pos = Position;GP = Games played; Min, TOI = Minutes played; W = Wins; L = Losses; T,T/OT = Ties; OTL = Overtime losses; GA = Goals-against; GAA = Goals-against average; SO = Shutouts; SA = Shots against; SV = Shots saved; SV% = Save percentage;

Regular season

Player	GP	Min	W	L	OT	GA	GAA	SA	SV	Sv%	SO
Jonathan Quick	44	2494	21	18	2	103	2.48	1200	1097	.914	4
Erik Ersberg	28	1477	8	11	5	65	2.64	651	586	.900	0
Jason LaBarbera^{‡}	19	995	8	10	6	47	2.83	439	392	.893	2

^{†}Denotes player spent time with another team before joining Kings. Stats reflect time with the Kings only.
^{‡}Traded mid-season
Bold/italics denotes franchise record

== Awards and records ==
=== Milestones ===
Regular Season
Player	Milestone	Reached
Oscar Moller	1st NHL Game	October 11, 2008
Drew Doughty	1st NHL Game	October 11, 2008
Wayne Simmonds	1st NHL Game	October 11, 2008
Michal Handzus	600th NHL Game; 200th NHL Assist	October 11, 2008
Oscar Moller	1st NHL Assist; 1st NHL Point	October 14, 2008
Wayne Simmonds	1st NHL Goal; 1st NHL Point	October 14, 2008
Kyle Quincey	1st NHL Assist	October 17, 2008
Wayne Simmonds	1st NHL Assist	October 17, 2008
Oscar Moller	1st NHL Goal	October 20, 2008
Drew Doughty	1st NHL Goal; 1st NHL Point	October 20, 2008
Denis Gauthier	500th NHL Game	November 4, 2008
Drew Doughty	1st NHL Assist	November 6, 2008
Jarret Stoll	300th NHL Game	November 11, 2008
Alexander Frolov	400th NHL Game	November 29, 2008
Tom Preissing	100th NHL Assist	November 29, 2008
Anze Kopitar	100th NHL Assist	December 17, 2008
Dustin Brown	300th NHL Game	December 19, 2008
Trevor Lewis	1st NHL Game	December 19, 2008
Trevor Lewis	1st NHL Goal; 1st NHL Point	December 20, 2008
Trevor Lewis	1st NHL Assist	December 23, 2008
Jonathan Quick	1st NHL Shutout	December 23, 2008
Alexander Frolov	300th NHL Point	January 17, 2009
Kevin Westgarth	1st NHL Game	January 20, 2009
Anze Kopitar	200th NHL Game	January 29, 2009
Davis Drewiske	1st NHL Game	February 3, 2009
Matt Greene	200th NHL Game	February 3, 2009
Jarret Stoll	200th NHL Point	February 18, 2009
Raitis Ivanans	200th NHL Game	February 21, 2009
Jack Johnson	100th NHL Game	March 1, 2009
Dustin Brown	100th NHL Assist	March 3, 2009
Sean O'Donnell	1,000th NHL Game	March 14, 2009
Peter Harrold	100th NHL Game	March 24, 2009
Anze Kopitar	200th NHL Point	March 28, 2009
Justin Williams	500th NHL Game	April 6, 2009

== Transactions ==
=== Trades ===
June 20, 2008	To Los Angeles Kings 1st-round pick (17th overall) in 2008 – Jake Gardiner; 2nd-round pick in 2009^{1} – Brian Dumoulin	To Calgary Flames Michael Cammalleri; 2nd-round pick in 2008 – Mitch Wahl
June 20, 2008	To Los Angeles Kings 1st-round pick (12th overall) in 2008 – Tyler Myers	To Anaheim Ducks 1st-round pick (17th overall) in 2008 – Jake Gardiner; 1st-round pick (28th overall) in 2008^{2} – Viktor Tikhonov
June 20, 2008	To Los Angeles Kings 1st-round pick (13th overall) in 2008 – Colten Teubert; 3rd-round pick in 2009^{3} – Ryan Howse	To Buffalo Sabres 1st-round pick (12th overall) in 2008 – Tyler Myers
June 29, 2008	To Los Angeles Kings Jarret Stoll; Matt Greene	To Edmonton Oilers Lubomir Visnovsky
July 1, 2008	To Los Angeles Kings Denis Gauthier; 2nd-round pick in 2010^{4} – Jason Zucker	To Philadelphia Flyers Patrik Hersley; Ned Lukacevic
July 21, 2008	To Los Angeles Kings Richard Clune	To Dallas Stars Lauri Tukonen
September 30, 2008	To Los Angeles Kings Sean O'Donnell	To Anaheim Ducks Conditional pick in 2009^{5}
December 30, 2008	To Los Angeles Kings 7th-round pick in 2009	To Vancouver Canucks Jason LaBarbera
March 4, 2009	To Los Angeles Kings Justin Williams	To Carolina Hurricanes Patrick O'Sullivan; Ales Kotalik

1. Pick later traded to Carolina Hurricanes.
2. Pick later traded to Phoenix Coyotes.
3. Pick later traded to Calgary Flames.
4. Pick later traded to Florida Panthers (then to Minnesota Wild).
5. Condition not satisfied.

=== Free agents ===
Player	Former team	Contract Terms
Erik Ersberg	Los Angeles Kings	One Year
Gabe Gauthier	Los Angeles Kings	Two Years
Matt Moulson	Los Angeles Kings	One Year
Joe Piskula	Los Angeles Kings	One Year
David Meckler	Manchester Monarchs (AHL)	Three Year, Entry-Level
Peter Harrold	Los Angeles Kings	Three Years
Drew Doughty	Guelph Storm (OHL)	Three Year, Entry-Level
Andrei Loktionov	Lokomotiv Yaroslavl (RSL)	Three Year, Entry-Level
Slava Voynov	Traktor Chelyabinsk (RSL)	Three Year, Entry-Level
Colten Teubert	Regina Pats (WHL)	Three Year, Entry Level
Jarret Stoll	Los Angeles Kings	Four Year, $14,400,000
Brad Richardson	Los Angeles Kings	Two Year, $1,175,000
Martin Jones	Calgary Hitmen (WHL)	Three Year, Entry Level
Patrick O'Sullivan	Los Angeles Kings	Three Year, $2,925,000
Anze Kopitar	Los Angeles Kings	Seven Years
Andrew Campbell	Sault Ste. Marie Greyhounds (OHL)	Three Year, Entry Level
Matt Greene	Los Angeles Kings	Five Years
Corey Elkins	Ohio State University (NCAA)	One Year, Entry Level
Patrick Mullen	Denver University (NCAA)	Two Year, Entry Level

Player	New team
Jon Klemm	Straubing Tigers (Germany)
Rob Blake	San Jose Sharks
Brendan Buckley	San Jose Sharks
Richard Petiot	Toronto Maple Leafs
Brian Willsie	Colorado Avalanche
Kevin Dallman	Barys Astana (Kazakhstan)
Scott Thornton	Retired
Jeff Giuliano	HC Dinamo Minsk (Belarus)
Ladislav Nagy	Severstal Cherepovets (Russia)
Dany Roussin	Bakersfield Condors (ECHL)
Petr Kanko	EC Red Bull Salzburg (Austria)

=== Waivers ===
Player / Former team / Date claimed off waivers; Kyle Quincey / Detroit Red Wings / October 13, 2008	Player / New team / Date claimed off waivers; Matt Ellis / Buffalo Sabres / October 1, 2008

=== Other ===
Player	Type of Transaction	Date
Bryan Cameron	Returned to Belleville Bulls (OHL)	September 23, 2008
Matt Fillier	Returned to Montreal Junior Hockey Club (QMJHL)	September 23, 2008
Geordie Wudrick	Returned to Swift Current Broncos (WHL)	September 23, 2008
Olivier Legault	Released from Try-Out	September 23, 2008
Colten Teubert	Returned to Regina Pats (WHL)	September 25, 2008
Dwight King	Returned to Lethbridge Hurricanes (WHL)	September 25, 2008
Linden Rowat	Returned to Regina Pats (WHL)	September 26, 2008
Justin Azevedo	Assigned to Manchester Monarchs (AHL)	September 29, 2008
Andrew Campbell	Assigned to Manchester Monarchs (AHL)	September 29, 2008
Paul Crosty	Assigned to Manchester Monarchs (AHL)	September 29, 2008
Vladimir Dravecky	Assigned to Manchester Monarchs (AHL)	September 29, 2008
Gabe Gauthier	Assigned to Manchester Monarchs (AHL)	September 29, 2008
Bud Holloway	Assigned to Manchester Monarchs (AHL)	September 29, 2008
Josh Kidd	Assigned to Manchester Monarchs (AHL)	September 29, 2008
Brady Murray	Assigned to Manchester Monarchs (AHL)	September 29, 2008
Marty Murray	Assigned to Manchester Monarchs (AHL)	September 29, 2008
Scott Parse	Assigned to Manchester Monarchs (AHL)	September 29, 2008
Daniel Taylor	Assigned to Manchester Monarchs (AHL)	September 29, 2008
Eric Werner	Assigned to Manchester Monarchs (AHL)	September 29, 2008
Jeff Zatkoff	Assigned to Manchester Monarchs (AHL)	September 29, 2008
Drew Bagnall	Assigned to Manchester Monarchs (AHL)	September 29, 2008
Jonathan Bernier	Assigned to Manchester Monarchs (AHL)	September 29, 2008
Trevor Lewis	Assigned to Manchester Monarchs (AHL)	September 29, 2008
Michael D'Orazio	Returned to Owen Sound Attack (OHL)	September 29, 2008
Andrei Loktionov	Returned to Windsor Spitfires (OHL)	October 1, 2008
Martin Jones	Returned to Calgary Hitmen (WHL)	October 2, 2008
David Meckler	Assigned to Manchester Monarchs (AHL)	October 2, 2008
Slava Voynov	Assigned to Manchester Monarchs (AHL)	October 2, 2008
Davis Drewiske	Assigned to Manchester Monarchs (AHL)	October 3, 2008
Joe Piskula	Assigned to Manchester Monarchs (AHL)	October 3, 2008
John Zeiler	Placed on Injured Reserve	October 3, 2008
Alec Martinez	Assigned to Manchester Monarchs (AHL)	October 6, 2008
Teddy Purcell	Assigned to Manchester Monarchs (AHL)	October 6, 2008
Jonathan Quick	Assigned to Manchester Monarchs (AHL)	October 6, 2008
Kevin Westgarth	Assigned to Manchester Monarchs (AHL)	October 6, 2008
Thomas Hickey	Returned to Seattle Thunderbirds (WHL)	October 6, 2008
Marc-Andre Cliche	Placed on Injured Reserve	October 6, 2008
Richard Clune	Placed on Injured Reserve	October 6, 2008
Jeff Zatkoff	Reassigned to Ontario Reign (ECHL)	October 7, 2008
Daniel Taylor	Reassigned to Reading Royals (ECHL)	October 8, 2008
Brady Murray	Reassigned to HC Lugano (Switzerland)	October 9, 2008
Jack Johnson	Placed on Injured Reserve	October 13, 2008
Matt Moulson	Assigned to Manchester Monarchs (AHL)	November 3, 2008
John Zeiler	Activated from Injured Reserve and Loaned to Manchester Monarchs (AHL)	November 3, 2008
John Zeiler	Recalled from Manchester Monarchs (AHL)	November 17, 2008
Richard Clune	Activated from Injured Reserve and assigned to Manchester Monarchs (AHL)	November 19, 2008
John Zeiler	Suspended for three games by the NHL	November 24, 2008
Brian Boyle	Assigned to Manchester Monarchs (AHL)	November 30, 2008
Brad Richardson	Placed on Injured Reserve	December 3, 2008
Jonathan Quick	Recalled from Manchester Monarchs (AHL)	December 16, 2008
Jeff Zatkoff	Reassigned to Manchester Monarchs (AHL) from Ontario Reign (ECHL)	December 17, 2008
Slava Voynov	Loaned to Russian National Junior Team	December 18, 2008
Trevor Lewis	Recalled from Manchester Monarchs (AHL)	December 18, 2008
Oscar Moller	Loaned to Swedish National Junior Team	December 18, 2008
Trevor Lewis	Assigned to Manchester Monarchs (AHL)	December 30, 2008
Brian Boyle	Recalled from Manchester Monarchs (AHL)	December 31, 2008
Oscar Moller	Recalled from Swedish National Junior Team	January 6, 2009
Slava Voynov	Reassigned from Russian National Junior Team to Manchester Monarchs (AHL)	January 6, 2009
Jeff Zatkoff	Reassigned to Ontario Reign (ECHL) from Manchester Monarchs (AHL)	January 13, 2009
Danny Taylor	Reassigned from Reading Royals (ECHL) to Manchester Monarchs (AHL)	January 13, 2009
Oscar Moller	Placed on Injured Reserve	January 14, 2009
Kevin Westgarth	Recalled from Manchester Monarchs (AHL)	January 14, 2009
Brad Richardson	Loaned to Manchester Monarchs (AHL) on a conditioning assignment	January 15, 2009
Brian Boyle	Assigned to Manchester Monarchs (AHL)	January 17, 2009
Jack Johnson	Activated from injured reserve	January 17, 2009
Jonathan Bernier	Recalled from Manchester Monarchs (AHL)	January 18, 2009
Teddy Purcell	Assigned to Manchester Monarchs (AHL)	January 18, 2009
Jonathan Bernier	Assigned to Manchester Monarchs (AHL)	January 22, 2009
Kevin Westgarth	Assigned to Manchester Monarchs (AHL)	January 22, 2009
Brad Richardson	Recalled from Manchester Monarchs (AHL)	January 22, 2009
Denis Gauthier	Suspended by NHL for five games	February 2, 2009
Davis Drewiske	Recalled from Manchester Monarchs (AHL)	February 2, 2009
Marc-Andre Cliche	Activated from Injured Reserve and assigned to Manchester Monarchs (AHL)	February 4, 2009
Oscar Moller	Activated from Injured Reserve	February 13, 2009
Tom Preissing	Placed on Injured Reserve	February 13, 2009
Davis Drewiske	Assigned to Manchester Monarchs (AHL)	February 15, 2009
Oscar Moller	Loaned to Manchester Monarchs (AHL) on a Conditioning Assignment	February 15, 2009
Bud Holloway	Reassigned from Manchester Monarchs (AHL) to Ontario Reign (ECHL)	February 18, 2009
Tom Preissing	Activated from Injured Reserve	March 1, 2009
Raitis Ivanans	Placed on Injured Reserve	March 1, 2009
Oscar Moller	Recalled from Manchester Monarchs (AHL)	March 2, 2009
Tom Preissing	Assigned to Manchester Monarchs (AHL)	March 4, 2009
Teddy Purcell	Assigned to Manchester Monarchs (AHL)	March 4, 2009
Teddy Purcell	Recalled from Manchester Monarchs (AHL)	March 4, 2009
Kevin Westgarth	Recalled from Manchester Monarchs (AHL)	March 7, 2009
Raitis Ivanans	Activated from Injured Reserve	March 12, 2009
Davis Drewiske	Recalled from Manchester Monarchs (AHL)	March 20, 2009
Justin Williams	Activated from Injured Reserve	March 20, 2009
Colten Teubert	Reassigned to Ontario Reign (ECHL)	March 20, 2009
Kevin Westgarth	Assigned to Manchester Monarchs (AHL)	March 23, 2009
Brian Boyle	Recalled from Manchester Monarchs (AHL)	March 27, 2009
Thomas Hickey	Reassigned to Manchester Monarchs (AHL)	March 31, 2009

== Draft picks ==
LA 's picks at the 2008 NHL entry draft in Ottawa, Ontario.

Round	#	Player	Position	Nationality	College/Junior/Club team (League)
1	2	Drew Doughty	D	Canada	Guelph Storm (OHL)
1	13	Colten Teubert	D	Canada	Regina Pats (WHL)
2	32	Slava Voynov	D	Russia	Traktor Chelyabinsk (RSL)
3	63	Robert Czarnik	C/RW	United States	U.S. National Team Development Program (NAHL)
3	74	Andrew Campbell	D	Canada	Sault Ste. Marie Greyhounds (OHL)
3	88	Geordie Wudrick	LW	Canada	Swift Current Broncos (WHL)
5	123	Andrei Loktionov	C	Russia	Lokomotiv Yaroslavl (RSL)
6	153	Justin Azevedo	C	Canada	Kitchener Rangers (OHL)
7	183	Garrett Roe	LW	United States	St. Cloud State University (WCHA)

== See also ==
- 2008–09 NHL season

== Farm teams ==
The Kings have one American Hockey League affiliate in the Manchester Monarchs. They also have two ECHL affiliates in the Ontario Reign and Reading Royals. All three are owned in part by the Kings' parent company Anschutz Entertainment Group.
