= Colten Teubert =

Canadian-German ice hockey player

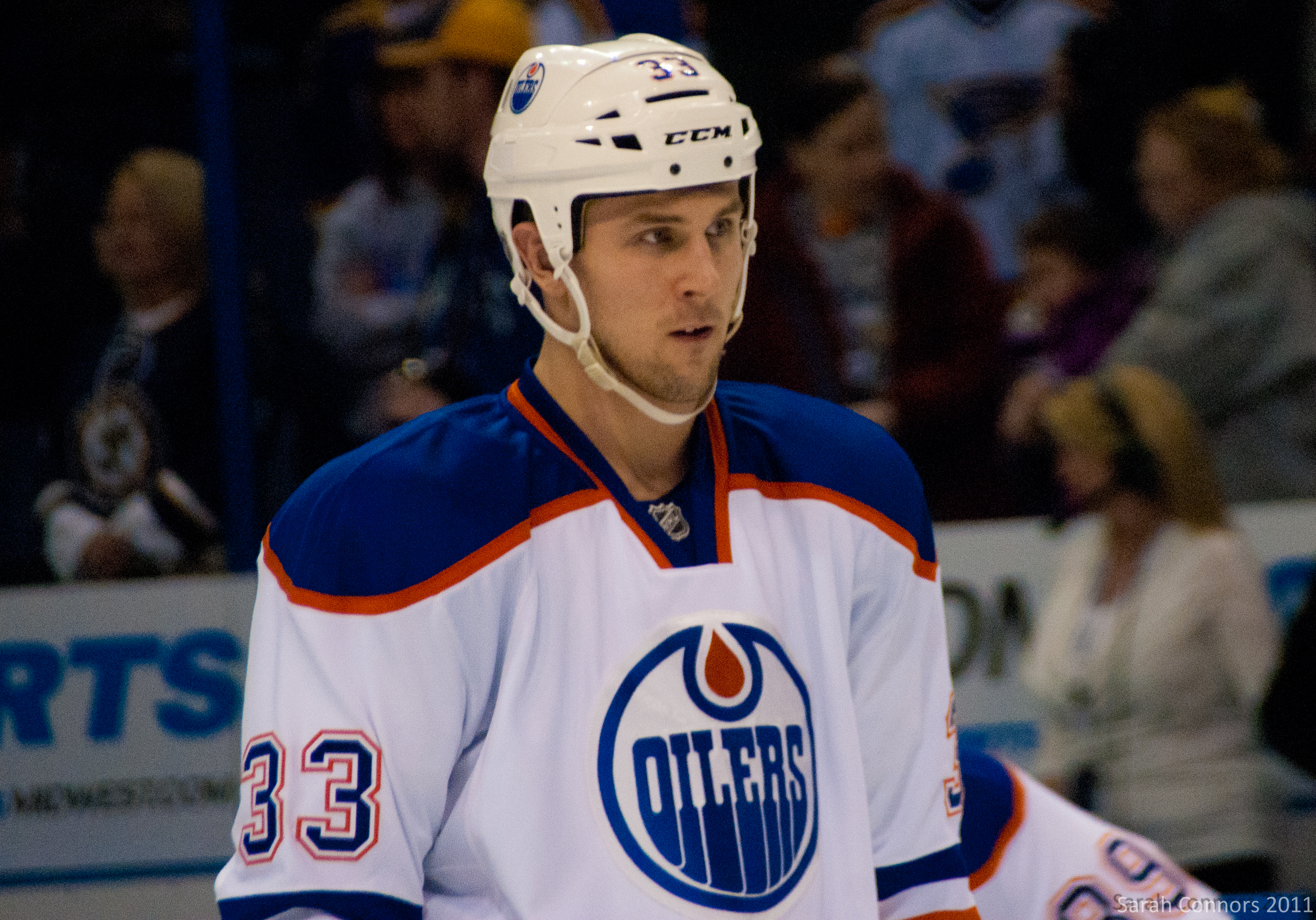
- Teubert with the Edmonton Oilers in 2012
- Born: March 8, 1990 (age 36) White Rock, British Columbia, Canada
- Height: 6 ft 4 in (193 cm)
- Weight: 195 lb (88 kg; 13 st 13 lb)
- Position: Defence
- Shot: Right
- Played for: Edmonton Oilers; Iserlohn Roosters; Thomas Sabo Ice Tigers
- NHL draft: 13th overall, 2008; Los Angeles Kings
- Playing career: 2009–2017

Colten Teubert (born March 8, 1990) is a Canadian-German former professional ice hockey defenceman and current head coach of the Hampton Roads Whalers USPHL Elite team. He most notably played for the Edmonton Oilers in the National Hockey League (NHL) before moving to Europe to play for the Iserlohn Roosters and the Thomas Sabo Ice Tigers of the Deutsche Eishockey Liga (DEL). He was drafted by the Los Angeles Kings in the first round, 13th overall, in the 2008 NHL entry draft. Before turning professional, he played in the Western Hockey League (WHL) with the Regina Pats, who drafted him first overall in the 2005 WHL Bantam Draft.

== Playing career ==
=== Regina Pats ===
Teubert was the first overall selection in the 2005 WHL Bantam Draft by the Regina Pats. Teubert made his debut for the Pats in the 2005–06 season, playing 14 regular season games, where he picked up 2 assists and another 6 games in the playoffs. In 2006–07, his rookie season with the Pats, he led the team in rookie defenseman scoring. During the 2007–08 season, Teubert played in the CHL Top Prospects Game along with teammate Jordan Eberle. Teubert finished the season eighth in team scoring and fourth among defensemen. After the 2007–08 season, Teubert was drafted in the first round of the 2008 NHL entry draft 13th overall by the Los Angeles Kings.

During the 2008–09 season, Teubert served as an assistant captain for the Pats, and he also suited up for the WHL in the CHL Canada-Russia Challenge (Subway Super Series). He repeated both of these feats during the 2009–10 season. During the 2009 Subway Super Series, Teubert served as team captain for the WHL team for one game. On January 12, 2010, Teubert was named captain of the Pats. At the end of the 2009–10 season, Teubert was named the Regina Pats best defenseman.

=== Professional ===
Teubert attended training camp with the Los Angeles Kings before the 2008–09 and 2009–10 seasons and was returned to the Pats each year. After the Pats' 2008–09 season was complete, Teubert made his professional debut when the Kings assigned him to the Ontario Reign of the ECHL on March 20, 2009. In September 2009, the Kings returned him to the Regina Pats. After the conclusion of the 2009–10 WHL season, Teubert was again assigned to the Reign for the conclusion of the 2009–10 ECHL season.

On February 28, 2011, Teubert was traded to the Edmonton Oilers along with Los Angeles's 2011 1st-round draft pick and 2012 2nd-round draft pick in a deadline day trade for Dustin Penner. Coincidentally, on November 3, 2011, Teubert played his first NHL game against the Kings. He played 24 games for the Oilers and 46 for AHL's Oklahoma City Barons that season. In 2012–13, Teubert saw the ice in 62 AHL contests for the Barons.

In 2013, he decided to continue his career abroad, accepting an offer from the Iserlohn Roosters of the German Deutsche Eishockey Liga (DEL). In February 2014, he inked a fresh two-year deal with the Roosters. When his contract was up following the 2015–16 season, he agreed to terms with DEL team Nürnberg Ice Tigers on a three-year deal.

== International play ==
Medal record

Representing Canada

Ice hockey

IIHF World U18 Championships
Gold medal – first place	2008 Russia	

World Junior Championships
Gold medal – first place	2009 Canada	
Silver medal – second place	2010 Canada	

Teubert started his international career by representing British Columbia at the 2007 Canada Winter Games, where his team finished fourth. He played for Canada at both Under-18 tournaments, including the 2007 Memorial of Ivan Hlinka (fourth-place finish) and the 2008 World Under-18 Championships (gold medal). Teubert played for Canada at the World Junior Championships in 2009 and 2010. In 2009, he helped Canada win a gold medal, while in 2010 the team took home silver. Teubert served as one of the team's alternate captains during the 2010 tournament.

== Coaching career ==
Following the conclusion of his contract with the Ice Tigers, having not played the previous two seasons due to injury, Teubert retired from professional hockey as a player and was announced as the head coach of a junior hockey team, the Bellingham Blazers of the Western States Hockey League, for the 2019–20 season. In 2021, Teubert took the position as the head coach of the United States Premier Hockey League Elite Division (USPHL Elite) team, the Hampton Roads Whalers, while also serving as an assistant coach with their Premier Division team.

== Personal ==
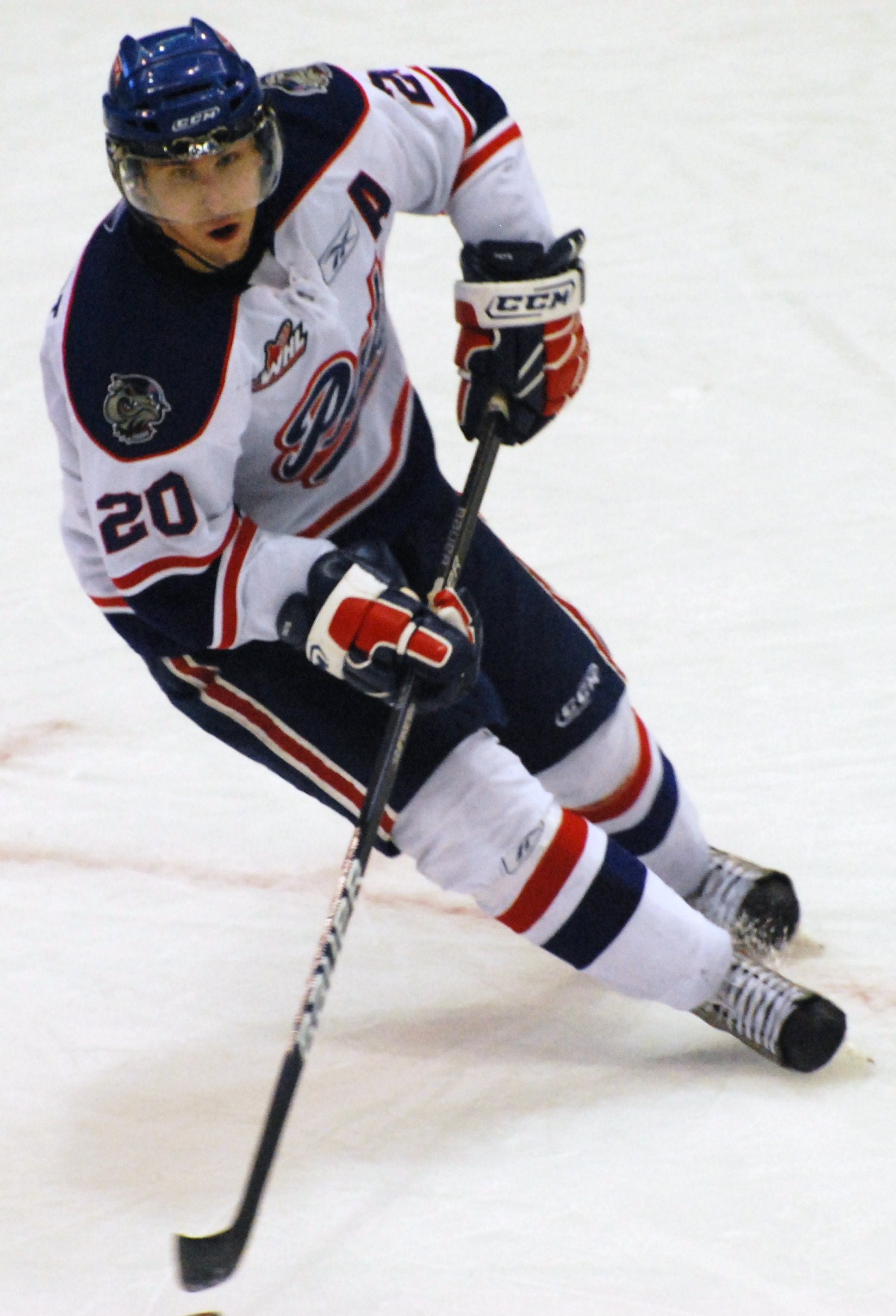
Colten Teubert skates in a game with the Regina Pats during the 2009–10 season.

He holds a German passport. Teubert's parents are Carl and Shauna, and he has three brothers Kaid, Teran, and Wyatt. His grandfather moved from Germany to Canada.

Regina mayor Pat Fiacco proclaimed January 8, 2010, as "Jordan Eberle and Colten Teubert Day" in Regina.

== Career statistics ==
=== Regular season and playoffs ===
			Regular season					Playoffs
Season	Team	League	GP	G	A	Pts	PIM	GP	G	A	Pts	PIM
2005–06	Regina Pats	WHL	14	0	2	2	16	6	0	1	1	4
2006–07	Regina Pats	WHL	63	3	8	11	91	10	0	1	1	13
2007–08	Regina Pats	WHL	66	7	16	23	135	6	1	4	5	6
2008–09	Regina Pats	WHL	60	12	25	37	136	—	—	—	—	—
2008–09	Ontario Reign	ECHL	8	0	1	1	10	6	0	1	1	19
2009–10	Regina Pats	WHL	60	10	30	40	115	—	—	—	—	—
2009–10	Ontario Reign	ECHL	10	1	2	3	10	—	—	—	—	—
2010–11	Manchester Monarchs	AHL	39	2	8	10	57	—	—	—	—	—
2010–11	Oklahoma City Barons	AHL	20	2	5	7	26	2	0	0	0	0
2011–12	Oklahoma City Barons	AHL	43	2	8	10	58	4	0	0	0	2
2011–12	Edmonton Oilers	NHL	24	0	1	1	25	—	—	—	—	—
2012–13	Oklahoma City Barons	AHL	62	4	6	10	113	1	0	0	0	4
2013–14	Iserlohn Roosters	DEL	40	1	6	7	110	9	1	1	2	0
2014–15	Iserlohn Roosters	DEL	44	2	4	6	100	7	1	1	2	4
2015–16	Iserlohn Roosters	DEL	51	2	8	10	102	6	0	3	3	2
2016–17	Thomas Sabo Ice Tigers	DEL	37	1	5	6	58	—	—	—	—	—
NHL totals			24	0	1	1	25	—	—	—	—	—
DEL totals			172	6	23	29	370	22	2	5	7	6

=== International ===
Year	Team	Event	Result	GP	G	A	Pts	PIM
2007	Canada	IH18	4th	4	0	0	0	8
2008	Canada	WJC18	1st place, gold medalist(s)	7	0	1	1	30
2009	Canada	WJC	1st place, gold medalist(s)	6	0	0	0	4
2010	Canada	WJC	2nd place, silver medalist(s)	6	0	1	1	0
Junior totals				23	0	2	2	42

Awards and achievements
Preceded by Drew Doughty	Los Angeles Kings first-round draft pick 2008	Succeeded by Brayden Schenn
