= Wayne Simmonds =

Canadian ice hockey player (born 1988)

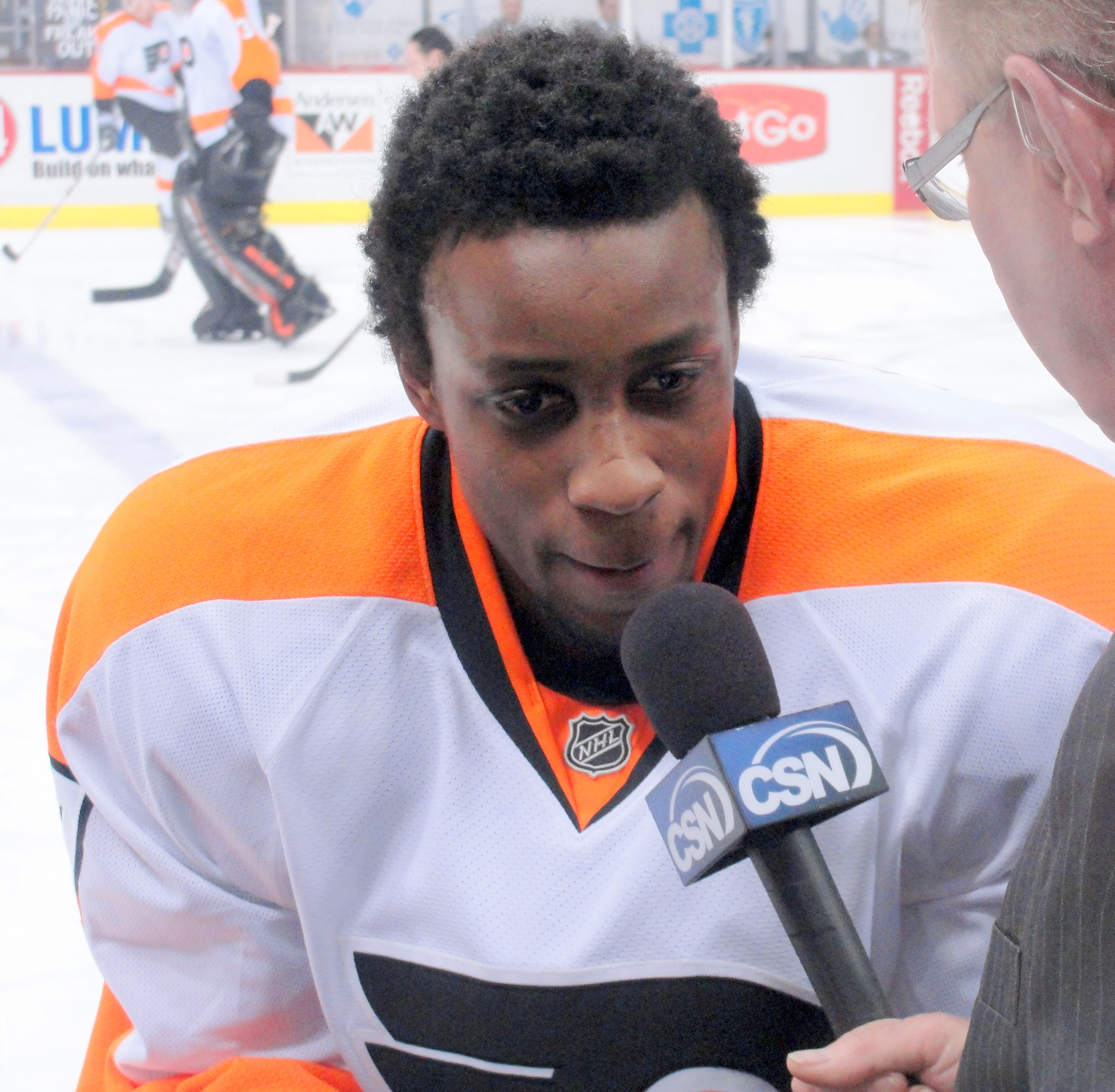
- Simmonds with the Philadelphia Flyers in 2012
- Born: August 26, 1988 (age 38) Scarborough, Ontario, Canada
- Height: 6 ft 2 in (188 cm)
- Weight: 184 lb (83 kg; 13 st 2 lb)
- Position: Right wing
- Shot: Right
- Played for: Los Angeles Kings; Philadelphia Flyers; HC Bílí Tygři Liberec; Nashville Predators; New Jersey Devils; Buffalo Sabres; Toronto Maple Leafs
- National team: Canada
- NHL draft: 61st overall, 2007; Los Angeles Kings
- Playing career: 2008–2023

Wayne Simmonds (born August 26, 1988) is a Canadian former professional ice hockey player. A right winger, he played in the National Hockey League (NHL) for the Los Angeles Kings, Philadelphia Flyers, Nashville Predators, New Jersey Devils, Buffalo Sabres, and Toronto Maple Leafs between 2008 and 2023. During the 2012–13 NHL lockout, Simmonds played in Europe with ETC Crimmitschau and HC Bílí Tygři Liberec. He is known to his teammates and fans by the nickname "Wayne Train".

== Early life ==
Simmonds was born and raised in the Toronto suburb of Scarborough and attended Birchmount Park Collegiate Institute, Ontario. He was the third of four sons, in addition to one daughter. His parents were Cyril Simmonds and Wanda Mercury-Simmonds. His family is originally from North Preston, Nova Scotia. Despite growing up in the Toronto area, Simmonds has said he grew up a fan primarily of the Detroit Red Wings. His favourite player growing up was Sergei Fedorov.

In third grade, Simmonds wrote a report for career day in which he stated his desire to be a professional ice hockey player. His teacher was discouraging, but Simmonds was undeterred.

Simmonds spent the majority of his minor hockey career playing A and AA hockey on the east side of Toronto, including the Minor Midget Toronto Aces in 2003–04 season of the Greater Toronto Hockey League (GTHL). After several GTHL AAA players graduated the following summer to junior hockey, Simmonds moved up to the AAA level for the first time with the Toronto Jr. Canadiens midgets of the GTHL in 2004–05.

== Athletic career ==
=== Amateur ===
After Simmonds was scouted at the Telus Cup Regional Midget tournament in the spring of 2005, Mike McCourt noticed him and signed him for the following season with the Brockville Braves of the Central Junior A Hockey League for the 2005–06 season. McCourt was general manager and coach of the Braves and added Simmonds to his club.

Two years after being passed over in the Ontario Hockey League (OHL) Draft, Simmonds was selected as an 18-year-old by the Owen Sound Attack in the sixth round, 114th overall, in the 2006 OHL Priority Selection.

Simmonds spent his major junior career playing two seasons in the OHL from 2006 until 2008 with the Owen Sound Attack and Sault Ste. Marie Greyhounds. He also played for Canada at the 2008 World Junior Ice Hockey Championships. While playing with the Jr. Canadiens, Simmonds became friends with Chris Stewart. The two would later purchase a house together in Toronto, where they lived during the off-season.

=== Professional ===
==== Los Angeles Kings ====
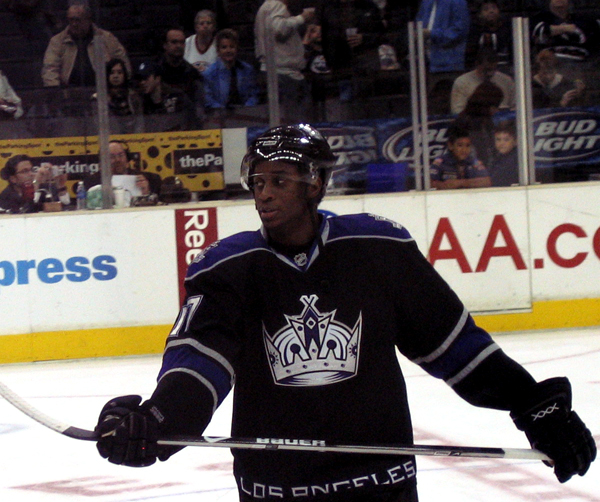
Simmonds with the Los Angeles Kings in 2008

A right-handed shooter, Simmonds was drafted by the Los Angeles Kings in the second round, 61st overall, of the 2007 NHL entry draft. He was one of three rookies to make the team's roster for its 2008–09 season. On October 14, 2008, in his third career game, Simmonds scored his first career NHL goal by knocking a rebound past Jean-Sébastien Giguère of the Anaheim Ducks. During his rookie season, Simmonds became a favourite among L.A. fans for his strong work ethic on and off the ice, a trait he has said was instilled within him by his parents.

Entering his second NHL season, Simmonds was looking to increase his offensive production, having tied for the Kings' goal-scoring lead in pre-season play that year. He ultimately scored 40 points in the 2009–10 regular season, nearly doubling his point total of the previous season. Additionally, he led the team in plus-minus and saw substantive time as a member of the team's penalty killing unit. When the Kings unsuccessfully pursued a trade for superstar left wing Ilya Kovalchuk, then of the Atlanta Thrashers, shortly before that season's All-Star break, Simmonds was among the Kings' players whom Atlanta wanted in return.

==== Philadelphia Flyers ====
On June 23, 2011, Simmonds was traded to the Philadelphia Flyers (along with Brayden Schenn and a second-round pick in the 2012 NHL entry draft) for Mike Richards and Rob Bordson. As a restricted free agent, he signed a two-year contract with an average salary of $1.75 million.

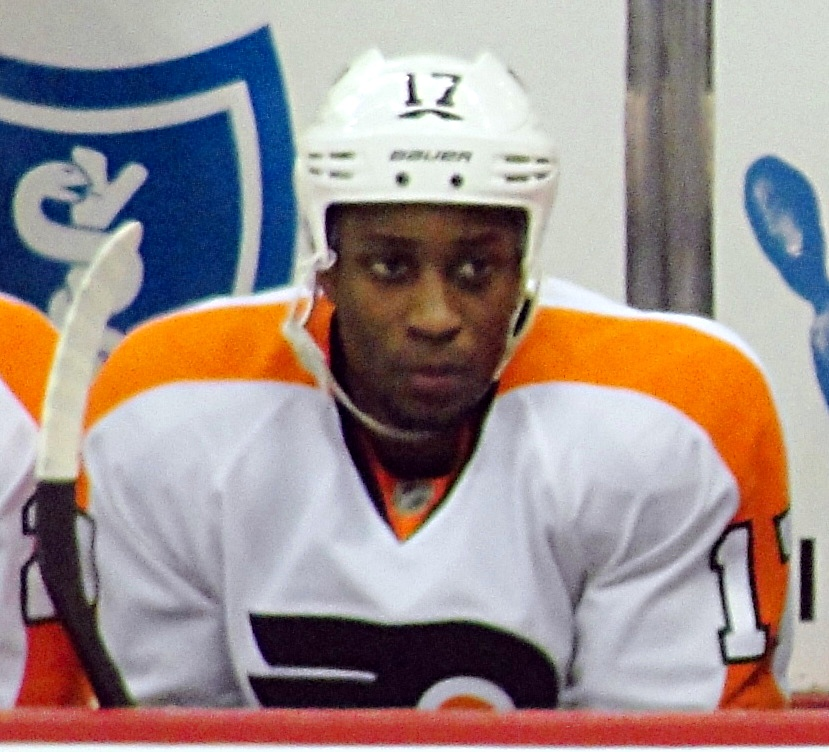
Simmonds during his first season with the Philadelphia Flyers in December 2011

On September 22, 2011, during a pre-season game in London, Ontario, between the Detroit Red Wings and the Flyers, a banana was thrown onto the ice while Simmonds was making a shootout attempt. This was seen as an act of racism. The following day, NHL commissioner Gary Bettman released a statement regarding the events of the previous day. "We have millions of great fans who show tremendous respect for our players and for the game," said Bettman in the statement, "the obviously stupid and ignorant action by one individual is in no way representative of our fans or the people of London, Ontario." Chris Moorhouse later pleaded guilty to engaging in a prohibited activity under the Ontario Trespass to Property Act and was fined $200, but did not need to appear in court.

Simmonds achieved a Gordie Howe hat trick in a 5–2 loss to the New York Rangers at the Wells Fargo Center on February 11, 2012. On March 30, 2012, against the Ottawa Senators, Flyers center Brayden Schenn shot a puck which glanced off of Simmonds' forehead and into the net. Simmonds was credited with the goal.

On August 15, 2012, the Flyers signed Simmonds to a six-year extension worth an annual average value of approximately $4 million.

During the 2012–13 NHL lockout, Simmonds was playing with ETC Crimmitschau of the 2nd Bundesliga and HC Bílí Tygři Liberec of the Czech Extraliga. In a game between Liberec and Piráti Chomutov in the Czech Extraliga, fans began a chant of "opice", a term which roughly translates to "monkey", towards Simmonds, after his involvement in a fight. Shortly after the game, Chomutov issued an apology to Simmonds and also announced the intent to identify the people involved and ban them from the venue. Eight of the offending fans were later identified and tried before a court. As a punishment, they were banned from visiting any sports matches for a year.

On February 20, 2013, Simmonds recorded another Gordie Howe hat trick in a 6–5 win against the Pittsburgh Penguins at the Consol Energy Center when he scored a goal and an assist and fought Tanner Glass. Later that same week, on February 23, Simmonds recorded another Gordie Howe hat trick in a 5–3 home win against the Winnipeg Jets, fighting Chris Thorburn, assisting on the Flyers' first goal and scoring the game-winning goal.

Simmonds recorded 29 goals to go with 31 assists for a career high 60 points during the 2013–14 season. He later matched this career-high during the 2015–16 season. Simmonds has also gained a reputation for his physical play, leading the Flyers in penalty minutes in 2015–16 with 147. During a February 6 game against the New York Rangers, Simmonds received a game misconduct for punching Rangers' captain Ryan McDonagh with a gloved hand, but was not suspended by the league.

Simmonds represented Philadelphia in the 2017 NHL All-Star Game and was named the Game's MVP after scoring three goals, including the game-winner of the final game.

During the entire 2017–18 season, Simmonds played with a tear in his pelvis area, torn groin, fractured ankle, torn thumb ligament, and a busted jaw. Despite this long list of injuries, Simmonds was still able to break the 40-point mark on the season. He was nominated for the Mark Messier Leadership Award at the end of the season.

==== Nashville Predators ====
On February 25, 2019, the Flyers traded Simmonds to the Nashville Predators in exchange for forward Ryan Hartman, as well as a conditional fourth-round selection in the 2020 NHL entry draft. He was part of a larger series of trade deadline moves that Nashville made in order to increase their presence on the power play, as well as their overall physicality, both of which had been struggles for the team during the 2018–19 season. Simmonds joined the Predators with a 16-game goalless drought, which carried over to another eight games in Nashville before he scored in a 3–0 victory over the Toronto Maple Leafs on March 20. After putting up one goal and two assists in 17 regular season games with Nashville, Simmonds joined the Predators at the 2019 Stanley Cup playoffs. He left Game 2 of the first-round playoff series against the Dallas Stars after being hit in the knee with a slapshot from teammate Roman Josi, and was considered week-to-week. Dallas won the series in six games, eliminating Nashville. Between Philadelphia and Nashville, Simmonds put up 17 goals and 30 points in 79 games, and he was the NHL's 2019 recipient of the Mark Messier Leadership Award, given to a community leader both on and off the ice.

==== New Jersey Devils ====
On July 1, 2019, the New Jersey Devils signed Simmonds as a free agent on a one-year, $5 million contract. Simmonds faced his former team, the Philadelphia Flyers, for the first time on October 9, 2019, where he was given a tribute video and an ovation by Flyers fans. However, soon after, he was booed each time he touched the puck during the game due to a viral video of him stating he would expect nothing else from Philadelphia. The Flyers defeated the Devils 4–0 in the end. Through 61 games with the Devils, Simmonds contributed with eight goals and 16 assists for 24 points.

==== Buffalo Sabres ====
With the Devils mathematically eliminated from contention in the 2020 Stanley Cup playoffs by the February 24 trade deadline, Simmonds was traded to the Buffalo Sabres in exchange for a conditional fifth-round selection in the 2021 NHL entry draft (conditions met - used to select Topias Vilén). He played only seven games with Buffalo before the season was suspended indefinitely due to the COVID-19 pandemic on March 12. In that time, Simmonds recorded only one assist and held a −4 plus-minus rating. When the NHL announced its Return to Play program for the 2020 Stanley Cup playoffs, the Sabres were one of seven teams not invited to participate.

==== Toronto Maple Leafs ====
Although he maintained interest in staying with Buffalo, Simmonds was allowed to court offers from other NHL teams prior to the opening of the free agent market on October 9, 2020. When the market opened, Simmonds signed a one-year, $1.5 million contract with the Toronto Maple Leafs. Simmonds signed with the team only minutes after the market opened, and he had rejected a higher offer from the Montreal Canadiens in order to play for his hometown team. As his usual jersey number 17 was retired by the Maple Leafs for Wendel Clark, Simmonds switched his jersey number to 24. He had a productive beginning to the 2020–21 season, scoring five goals in his first 12 games while serving on the second line with John Tavares and William Nylander. This offensive production came to a halt on February 6, when he suffered a fractured wrist in a game against the Vancouver Canucks. Simmonds began skating with the team again in March, but was hesitant to return to the lineup, afraid that he would aggravate the injury. After missing 18 games, Simmonds returned from the injured reserve on March 19, skating in a 4–3 loss to the Calgary Flames. He began playing on a bottom-six line alongside Pierre Engvall and Ilya Mikheyev and scored his first post-injury goal on April 6. Simmonds' offensive power did not return after his injury, and the winger scored only one goal in his last 14 regular season games. Toronto, meanwhile, advanced to the 2021 Stanley Cup playoffs and built a 3–1 series lead over Montreal before losing three games straight and dropping the series 4–3.

An impending free agent, Simmonds signed a two-year, $1.8 million contract extension with Toronto on June 29, 2021. On March 5, 2022, Simmonds played his 1,000th NHL game, on the same day as Seattle Kraken defenceman Mark Giordano's own 1,000th game, who would become his teammate several days later. On May 4, Simmonds was chosen as the Maple Leafs' nominee for the King Clancy Memorial Trophy for his leadership qualities on and off the ice. In the 2022–23 season with Toronto, Simmonds played in only 18 games, being a healthy scratch for several others, placed on waivers multiple times and demoted to the AHL with Toronto's affiliate, the Toronto Marlies, as injuries limited his ability. At the end of the season, Simmonds became an unrestricted free agent.

==== Retirement ====
On March 18, 2024, Simmonds announced his retirement from professional ice hockey, after previously stating in January that his career was over. On April 12, he signed a ceremonial one-day contract to retire as a member of the Philadelphia Flyers.

== Career statistics ==
=== Regular season and playoffs ===
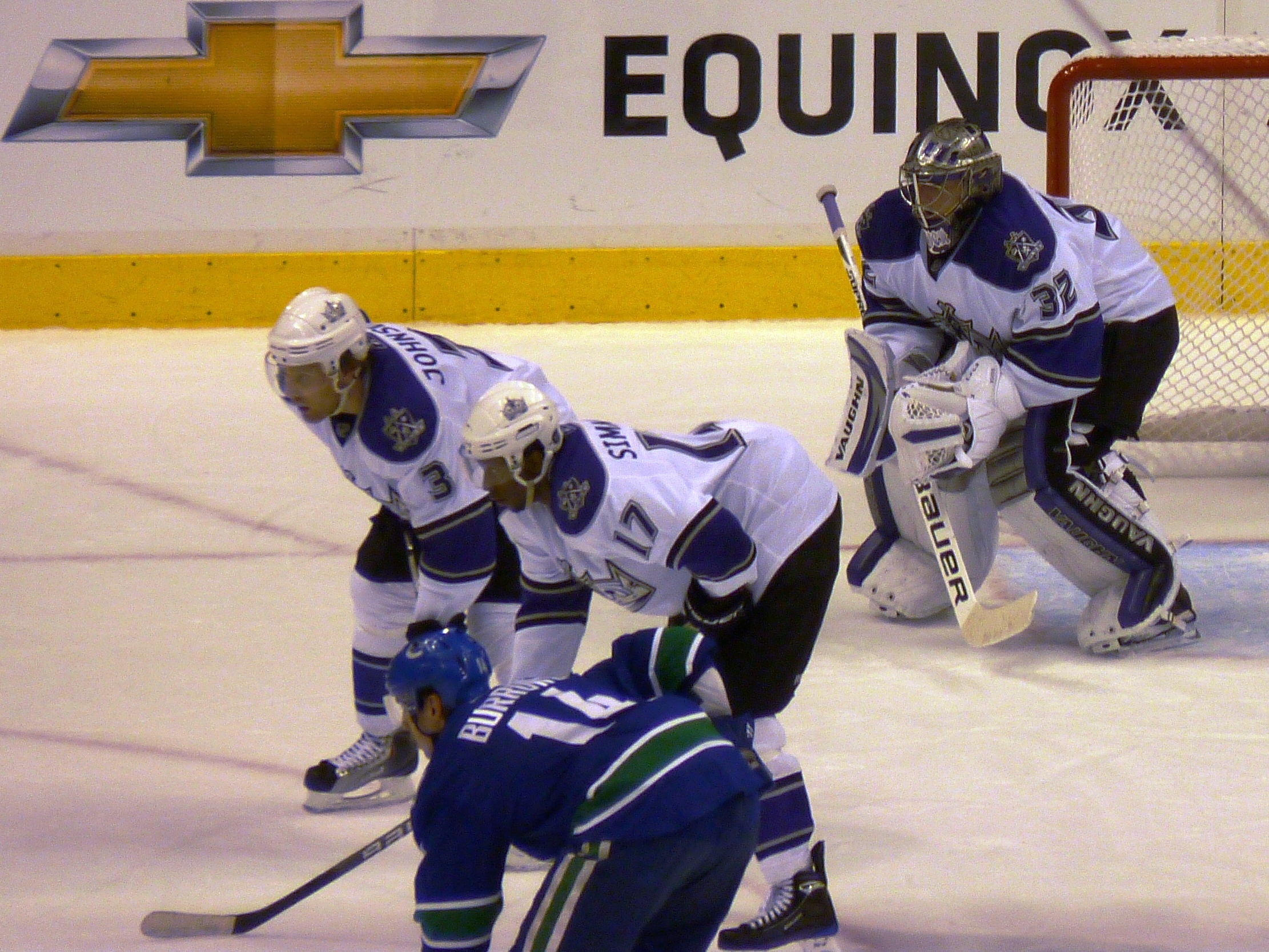
Simmonds with the Kings in the 2010 Stanley Cup playoffs.

			Regular season					Playoffs
Season	Team	League	GP	G	A	Pts	PIM	GP	G	A	Pts	PIM
2004–05	Toronto Jr. Canadiens	GTHL	67	32	40	72	97	—	—	—	—	—
2005–06	Brockville Braves	CJHL	49	24	19	43	127	7	4	2	6	12
2006–07	Owen Sound Attack	OHL	66	23	26	49	112	4	1	1	2	4
2007–08	Owen Sound Attack	OHL	29	17	22	39	43	—	—	—	—	—
2007–08	Sault Ste. Marie Greyhounds	OHL	31	16	20	36	68	14	5	9	14	22
2008–09	Los Angeles Kings	NHL	82	9	14	23	73	—	—	—	—	—
2009–10	Los Angeles Kings	NHL	78	16	24	40	116	6	2	1	3	9
2010–11	Los Angeles Kings	NHL	80	14	16	30	75	6	1	2	3	20
2011–12	Philadelphia Flyers	NHL	82	28	21	49	114	11	1	5	6	38
2012–13	ETC Crimmitschau	2.GBun	9	4	10	14	35	—	—	—	—	—
2012–13	HC Bílí Tygři Liberec	ELH	6	4	2	6	4	—	—	—	—	—
2012–13	Philadelphia Flyers	NHL	45	15	17	32	82	—	—	—	—	—
2013–14	Philadelphia Flyers	NHL	82	29	31	60	106	7	4	1	5	20
2014–15	Philadelphia Flyers	NHL	75	28	22	50	66	—	—	—	—	—
2015–16	Philadelphia Flyers	NHL	81	32	28	60	147	6	0	2	2	13
2016–17	Philadelphia Flyers	NHL	82	31	23	54	122	—	—	—	—	—
2017–18	Philadelphia Flyers	NHL	75	24	22	46	57	6	0	2	2	6
2018–19	Philadelphia Flyers	NHL	62	16	11	27	90	—	—	—	—	—
2018–19	Nashville Predators	NHL	17	1	2	3	9	2	0	0	0	0
2019–20	New Jersey Devils	NHL	61	8	16	24	64	—	—	—	—	—
2019–20	Buffalo Sabres	NHL	7	0	1	1	2	—	—	—	—	—
2020–21	Toronto Maple Leafs	NHL	38	7	2	9	45	7	0	1	1	2
2021–22	Toronto Maple Leafs	NHL	72	5	11	16	96	2	0	0	0	14
2022–23	Toronto Maple Leafs	NHL	18	0	2	2	49	—	—	—	—	—
NHL totals			1,037	263	263	526	1,313	53	8	14	22	122

=== International ===
Medal record

Men's ice hockey

Representing Canada

World Championships
Silver medal – second place	2017 Germany/France	

World Junior Championships
Gold medal – first place	2008 Czech Republic	

Year	Team	Event	Result	GP	G	A	Pts	PIM
2008	Canada	WJC	1st place, gold medalist(s)	7	1	0	1	4
2013	Canada	WC	5th	8	1	0	1	2
2017	Canada	WC	2nd place, silver medalist(s)	10	0	2	2	4
Junior totals				7	1	0	1	4
Senior totals				18	1	2	3	6

== Awards and honors ==
Award	Year	Ref
OHL
Third All-Star Team	2008	
NHL
NHL All-Star	2017	
All-Star Game MVP	2017	
Mark Messier Leadership Award	2019	

Awards and achievements
Preceded by Claude Giroux	Winner of the Bobby Clarke Trophy; 2016–17	Succeeded by Claude Giroux
