= Joe Piskula =

American ice hockey player

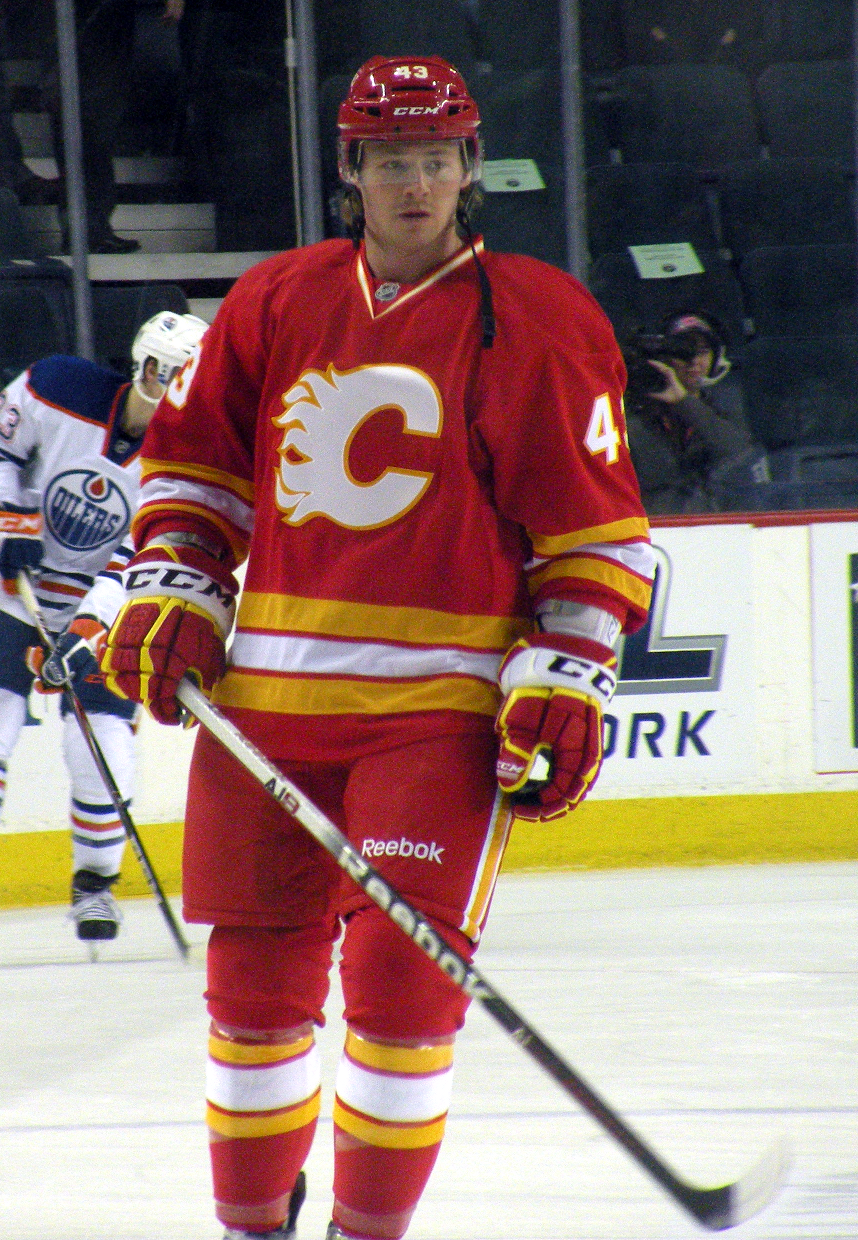
- Born: July 5, 1984 (age 42) Antigo, Wisconsin, USA
- Height: 6 ft 3 in (191 cm)
- Weight: 214 lb (97 kg; 15 st 4 lb)
- Position: Defense
- Shot: Left
- Played for: Los Angeles Kings; Calgary Flames; Nashville Predators; Leksands IF; Ilves; HC TPS
- NHL draft: Undrafted
- Playing career: 2006–2020

Joseph J. Piskula (born July 5, 1984) is an American former professional ice hockey defenseman who played in the National Hockey League (NHL). Piskula ended his playing career serving as an alternate captain for HC TPS in the Finnish Liiga.

== Playing career ==
A native of Antigo, Wisconsin, of Croatian ancestry, Piskula played junior hockey with the Chicago Steel and Des Moines Buccaneers of the United States Hockey League (USHL). He was recruited to play with the Wisconsin Badgers hockey program, and was a member of the team for three seasons between 2004 and 2007. He appeared in 112 games for the Badgers and was given the Otto Breitenbach Award as the team's most improved player in 2005–06. An undrafted player, Piskula chose to forgo his senior year of eligibility by signing as a free agent with the Los Angeles Kings on March 21, 2007. He made his NHL debut two nights later, against the Chicago Blackhawks, and played in five games with Los Angeles at the end of the 2006–07 NHL season.

Piskula spent the following three seasons playing in the American Hockey League (AHL) with the Kings' affiliate, the Manchester Monarchs. He appeared in 189 games over that time, scoring 2 goals and 29 assists. As a free agent in 2010, he was offered a try-out with the Philadelphia Flyers, but ultimately signed a contract with the AHL's Abbotsford Heat. His play in Abbotsford during the 2010–11 season impressed the Heat's parent club, leading the Calgary Flames to sign him to an NHL two-way contract on July 1, 2011. He spent the majority of the season with Abbotsford, but earned a recall to Calgary on December 1, 2011. He appeared in five games with the Flames before being returned to Abbotsford.

During the 2012–13 season whilst with the Abbotsford Heat, Piskula was traded by the Flames to the Nashville Predators in exchange for Brian McGrattan on February 28, 2013 and was reassigned to AHL affiliate, the Milwaukee Admirals. On October 9, 2014, Piskula was named Captain of the Milwaukee Admirals.

On July 1, 2015, Piskula joined his fourth organization as a free agent in signing a one-year, two-way contract with the Anaheim Ducks. Primarily added to add depth to the Ducks, Piskula was reassigned and named the captain of the San Diego Gulls of the AHL. During the 2015–16 season, Piskula was recalled to the Ducks for 1 game but ended up being a healthy scratch.

As a free agent from the Ducks, Piskula opted to pursue a career abroad, signing a one-year deal with Swedish club, Leksands IF of the SHL on September 13, 2016.

== Career statistics ==
			Regular season					Playoffs
Season	Team	League	GP	G	A	Pts	PIM	GP	G	A	Pts	PIM
2002–03	Chicago Steel	USHL	13	0	0	0	18	—	—	—	—	—
2002–03	Des Moines Buccaneers	USHL	32	2	6	8	18	4	0	1	1	4
2003–04	Des Moines Buccaneers	USHL	58	2	4	6	68	3	0	1	1	0
2004–05	U. of Wisconsin–Madison	WCHA	40	0	6	6	24	—	—	—	—	—
2005–06	U. of Wisconsin–Madison	WCHA	34	2	9	11	22	—	—	—	—	—
2006–07	U. of Wisconsin–Madison	WCHA	38	1	4	5	34	—	—	—	—	—
2006–07	Los Angeles Kings	NHL	5	0	0	0	6	—	—	—	—	—
2007–08	Manchester Monarchs	AHL	55	0	6	6	57	4	0	0	0	4
2008–09	Manchester Monarchs	AHL	67	0	12	12	40	—	—	—	—	—
2009–10	Manchester Monarchs	AHL	72	2	10	12	51	16	2	2	4	12
2010–11	Abbotsford Heat	AHL	71	1	11	12	73	—	—	—	—	—
2011–12	Abbotsford Heat	AHL	59	3	15	18	48	—	—	—	—	—
2011–12	Calgary Flames	NHL	5	0	0	0	2	—	—	—	—	—
2012–13	Abbotsford Heat	AHL	46	2	8	10	51	—	—	—	—	—
2012–13	Milwaukee Admirals	AHL	23	1	3	4	15	4	0	0	0	0
2013–14	Milwaukee Admirals	AHL	73	3	20	23	56	3	0	1	1	4
2013–14	Nashville Predators	NHL	2	0	0	0	0	—	—	—	—	—
2014–15	Milwaukee Admirals	AHL	67	1	16	17	30	—	—	—	—	—
2014–15	Nashville Predators	NHL	1	0	0	0	2	—	—	—	—	—
2015–16	San Diego Gulls	AHL	43	0	5	5	30	5	0	0	0	4
2016–17	Leksands IF	SHL	51	1	8	9	47	—	—	—	—	—
2017–18	Ilves	Liiga	50	2	4	6	53	—	—	—	—	—
2018–19	TPS	Liiga	48	1	11	12	44	—	—	—	—	—
2019–20	TPS	Liiga	51	1	9	10	52	—	—	—	—	—
NHL totals			13	0	0	0	10	—	—	—	—	—
