= Brayden Schenn =

Canadian ice hockey player (born 1991)

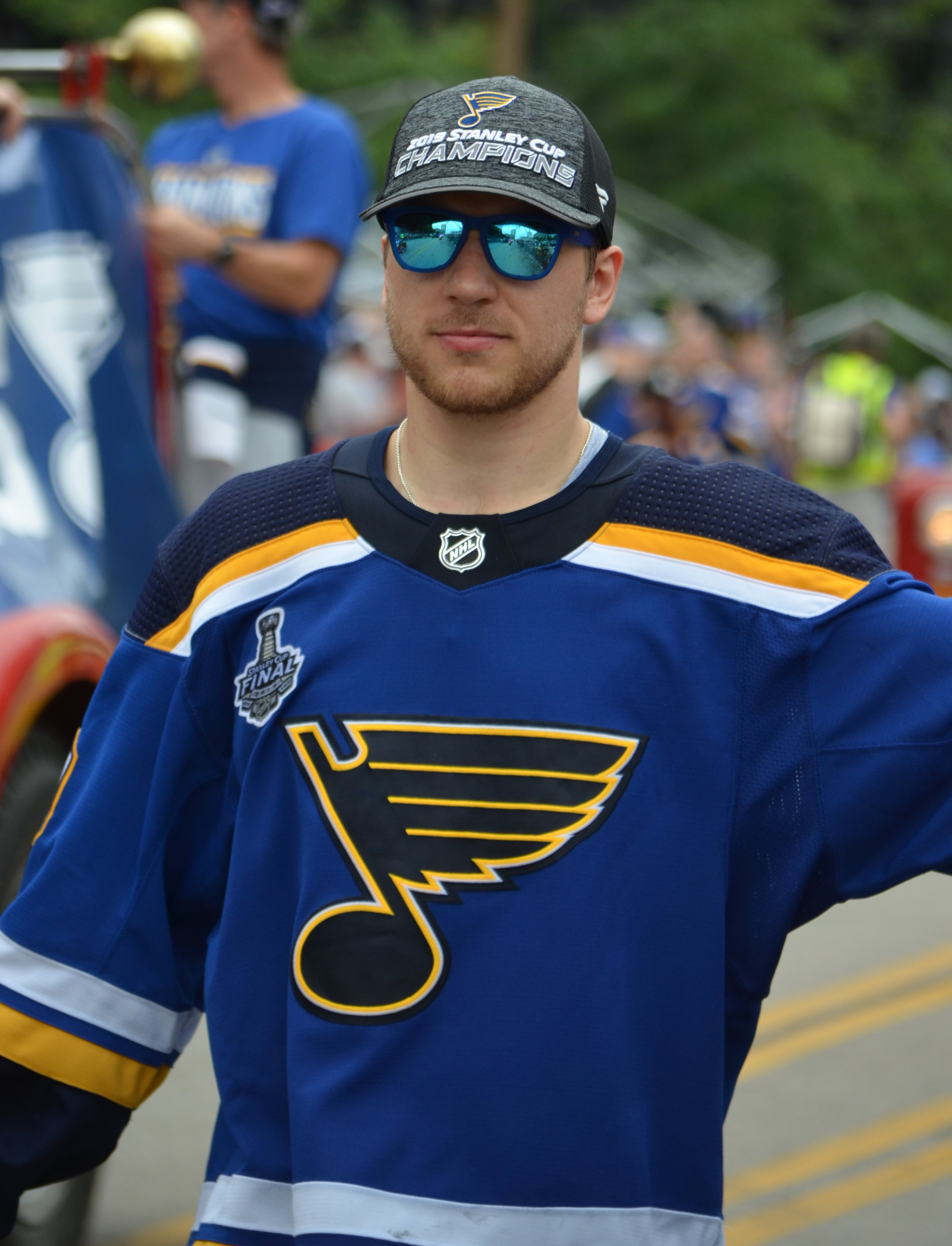
- Schenn with the St. Louis Blues in 2019
- Born: August 22, 1991 (age 35) Saskatoon, Saskatchewan, Canada
- Height: 6 ft 1 in (185 cm)
- Weight: 190 lb (86 kg; 13 st 8 lb)
- Position: Centre
- Shoots: Left
- NHL team Former teams: New York Islanders; Los Angeles Kings; Philadelphia Flyers; St. Louis Blues
- National team: Canada
- NHL draft: 5th overall, 2009; Los Angeles Kings
- Playing career: 2009–present

Brayden Michael Schenn (/ʃɛn/ SHEN; born August 22, 1991) is a Canadian professional ice hockey player who is a centre and alternate captain for the New York Islanders of the National Hockey League (NHL) and the former captain of the St. Louis Blues. He was selected by the Los Angeles Kings fifth overall in the 2009 NHL entry draft. He also played for the Philadelphia Flyers from 2011 to 2017 before being traded to the Blues in 2017.

Schenn has represented Canada internationally at several tournaments, and won two silver medals at the 2010 and 2011 World Junior Championships. At the 2011 tournament, Schenn tied Canada's record for points in a single tournament, and was selected to the Tournament's All-Star Team and named Top Forward and Most Valuable Player. Schenn won the Stanley Cup as a member of the Blues in 2019.

== Playing career ==
=== Minor ===
Schenn played minor hockey in his hometown of Saskatoon, Saskatchewan. He played AAA midget hockey for the Saskatoon Contacts. During the 2006–07 season, his teammates included Jared Cowen and Carter Ashton. In the 2006 WHL bantam draft, Schenn was selected in the first round, ninth overall, by the Brandon Wheat Kings. His teammates Cowen and Ashton were selected first and eighth overall, respectively. In his last season of midget hockey, he scored 70 points in 41 games.

=== Junior ===
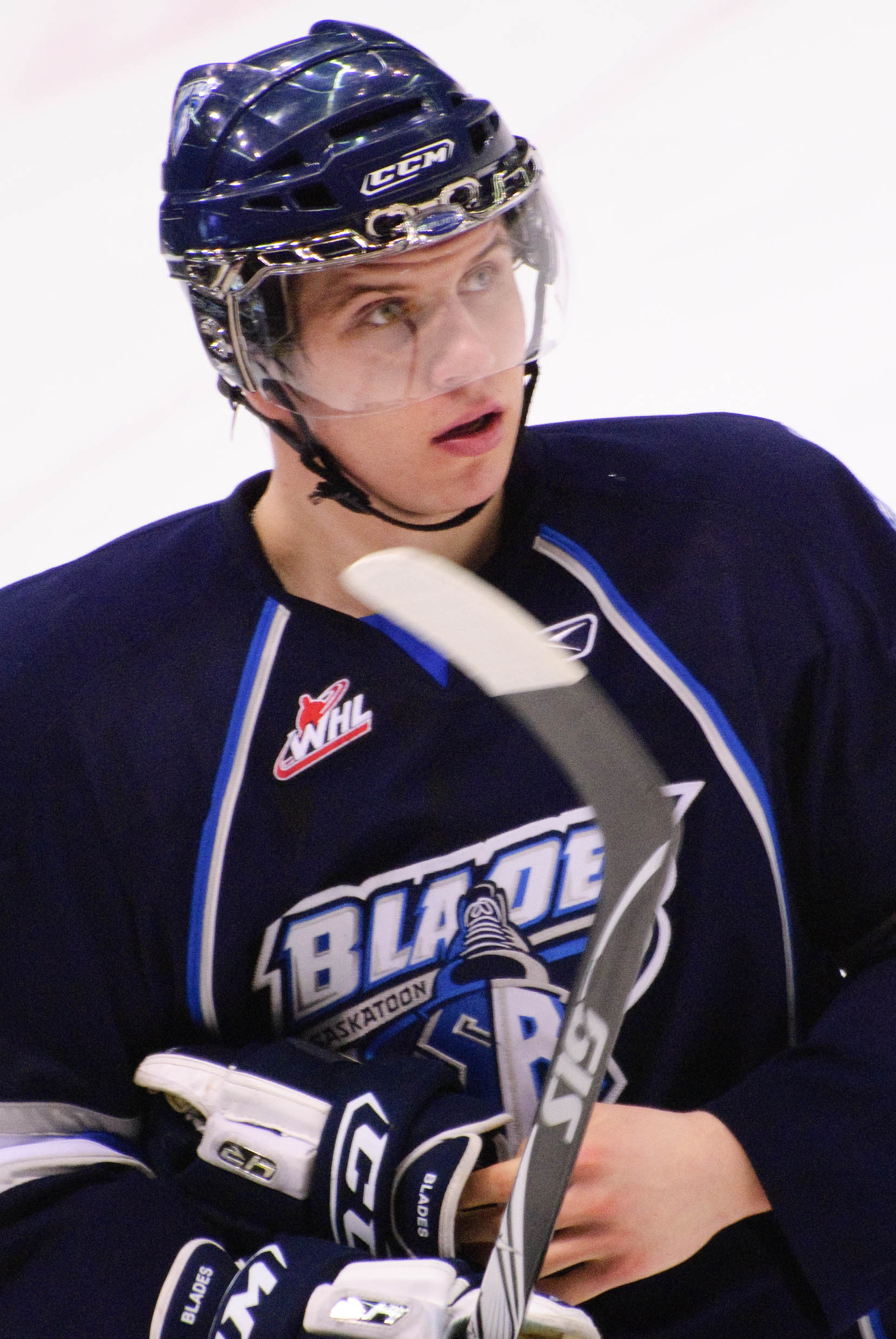
Schenn with the Saskatoon Blades in 2011

Schenn started his major junior career with the Brandon Wheat Kings in 2007–08. He was Brandon's first pick in the 2006 WHL bantam draft. Schenn made his WHL debut on September 21, 2007, against the Saskatoon Blades, earning his first WHL point, an assist. Later in the season, on October 17, he notched his first WHL goal against the Red Deer Rebels. Schenn finished his first season as the Wheat Kings' leading scorer and as the top rookie scorer in the WHL tallying 28 goals and 43 assists for 71 points, earning him the Jim Piggott Memorial Trophy as WHL Rookie of the Year, and a spot on the Canadian Hockey League (CHL) All-Rookie Team. He was also the inaugural winner of the 2007–08 Boston Pizza WHL 'Fan's Choice' Award. He also picked up the Wheat Kings team awards for Rookie of the Year and Most Popular Player.

Schenn spent the 2008–09 season playing with the Wheat Kings and served as their co-captain alongside Matt Calvert. In January 2009, he was named the WHL and CHL Player of the Week, after scoring 7 points in two games. Also in January, Schenn was selected as the winner of the H. L. (Krug) Crawford Memorial Medal which is emblematic of athletic achievement in western Manitoba. He finished the season with 85 points in 69 games to lead the Wheat Kings in scoring a second consecutive season. He finished seventh overall in scoring for the WHL, and was named to the WHL's Eastern Conference Second All-Star Team. During the season, Schenn played in the CHL Top Prospects Game and represented the WHL in the ADT Canada–Russia Challenge.

Leading up to the 2009 NHL entry draft, Schenn had been listed as the third highest prospect among WHL players in the NHL Central Scouting Service (CSS)'s preliminary rankings, while International Scouting (ISS) ranked him at fifth overall and first in the WHL. Schenn's ranking remained the same at fifth overall with the NHL CSS's midway ranking. E. J. McGuire, the director of NHL's Central Scouting Bureau compared facets of Schenn's game to Jonathan Cheechoo and Joe Thornton. At the 2009 NHL entry draft, he managed to be drafted in exactly the same amateur selection position his brother Luke had two years earlier, as he was drafted fifth overall by the Los Angeles Kings.

At the start of the 2009–10 hockey season, Schenn attended training camp with the Kings, but was considered a long shot to make the team. Schenn was returned to Brandon after being one of the last cuts at camp. He served as Brandon's captain for the 2009–10 WHL season. During the season, Schenn again represented the WHL in the Canada-Russia Challenge series. He finished the regular season with 99 points (34 goals, 65 assists) in 59 games, which tied him for fourth overall in WHL scoring with teammate Matt Calvert. Schenn was named to the WHL Eastern Conference First All-Star Team.

On December 3, 2010, the Kings returned Schenn to the Brandon Wheat Kings. He played two games with the Wheat Kings during the 2010-11 season before joining Team Canada at the 2011 World Junior Championships. After the tournament was complete, Schenn was dealt to his hometown Saskatoon Blades for a package of draft picks and prospects. He played in 27 games with the Blades, scoring 21 goals and adding 32 assists. Despite playing less than half a season in the WHL, Schenn was named to the league's Eastern Conference Second All-Star Team at the end of the regular season.

=== Professional ===
==== Los Angeles Kings ====
Schenn played his first NHL game on November 26, 2009, against the Vancouver Canucks after being called up on an emergency basis and signed to an amateur, one-game tryout. At the time of his debut, Schenn was the third youngest player to skate for the team. On March 3, 2010, he was signed to a three-year contract with the Kings. After training camp for the 2010–11 season, Schenn made the Kings roster but saw limited playing time. He appeared in nine games with the Kings, and spent time with the Manchester Monarchs of the American Hockey League (AHL) for conditioning. On December 3, 2010, the Kings returned Schenn to the Brandon Wheat Kings. Following the Saskatoon Blades' exit from the 2011 WHL Playoffs, he was assigned by the Kings back to the Monarchs on April 17, 2011.

==== Philadelphia Flyers ====
Schenn was traded to the Philadelphia Flyers with Wayne Simmonds and a 2012 second-round pick for Mike Richards and Rob Bordson on June 23, 2011. After sustaining an apparent shoulder injury in the Flyers' 2011–12 training camp, Schenn was sent down to the Adirondack Phantoms of the AHL for conditioning and salary cap purposes. He recorded two assists in his Phantoms debut, a 6–3 win over the Connecticut Whale. In his second game with Adirondack, he registered three goals and an assist in a 6–3 win against the Bridgeport Sound Tigers.

On October 20, 2011, Schenn made his Flyers debut in a 5–2 loss to the Washington Capitals, a game in which he struggled and registered a plus-minus rating of –3. He played three more games with the Flyers, but on October 26, he broke a bone in his foot blocking a slapshot in a 5–1 loss to the Montreal Canadiens. He missed just under a month of playing time. Upon returning from injury, he was reassigned to Adirondack for conditioning purposes. On January 2, 2012, Schenn scored his first NHL goal on a rebound during the second period against the New York Rangers, scoring against Henrik Lundqvist during the 2012 NHL Winter Classic. Schenn scored his first career hat trick on February 29, 2016, in a 5–3 win over the Calgary Flames. In response to Schenn's potent offensive style and scoring ability, the Philadelphia Flyers signed him to a four-year, $20.5 million contract in July 2016, for an average annual salary of $5,125,000 until the end of the 2019–20 season.

==== St. Louis Blues ====
On June 23, 2017, at the 2017 NHL entry draft, Schenn was traded by the Flyers to the St. Louis Blues for Jori Lehterä, a 2017 first-round pick, and a conditional 2018 first-round pick. In his first season with the Blues, Schenn broke out and put up career highs in points, assists, and goals. He recorded his third career hat trick on December 5, in a 4–3 win over the Montreal Canadiens and lead the Three Stars of the Week. The following month, Schenn was named to the 2018 NHL All-Star Game after recording 42 points in 32 games. He finished the season with a career-high 70 points in 82 games.

On June 12, 2019, the Blues won their first Stanley Cup in franchise history, defeating the Boston Bruins in seven games. Schenn recorded five goals and 12 points in 26 postseason games.

On October 4, 2019, the Blues signed Schenn to an eight-year, $52 million contract extension.

On September 19, 2023, Schenn was named the 24th captain in the Blues history.

On February 27, 2025, Schenn played his 1,000th NHL game, joining his brother Luke as the first pair of brothers to each record their 1,000th game played in the same season; Luke had achieved the milestone four months prior, on October 17, 2024.

==== New York Islanders ====
On March 6, 2026, Schenn was traded to the New York Islanders in exchange for Jonathan Drouin, prospect Marcus Gidlof, a 2026 first-round pick, and a 2026 third-round pick.

== International play ==
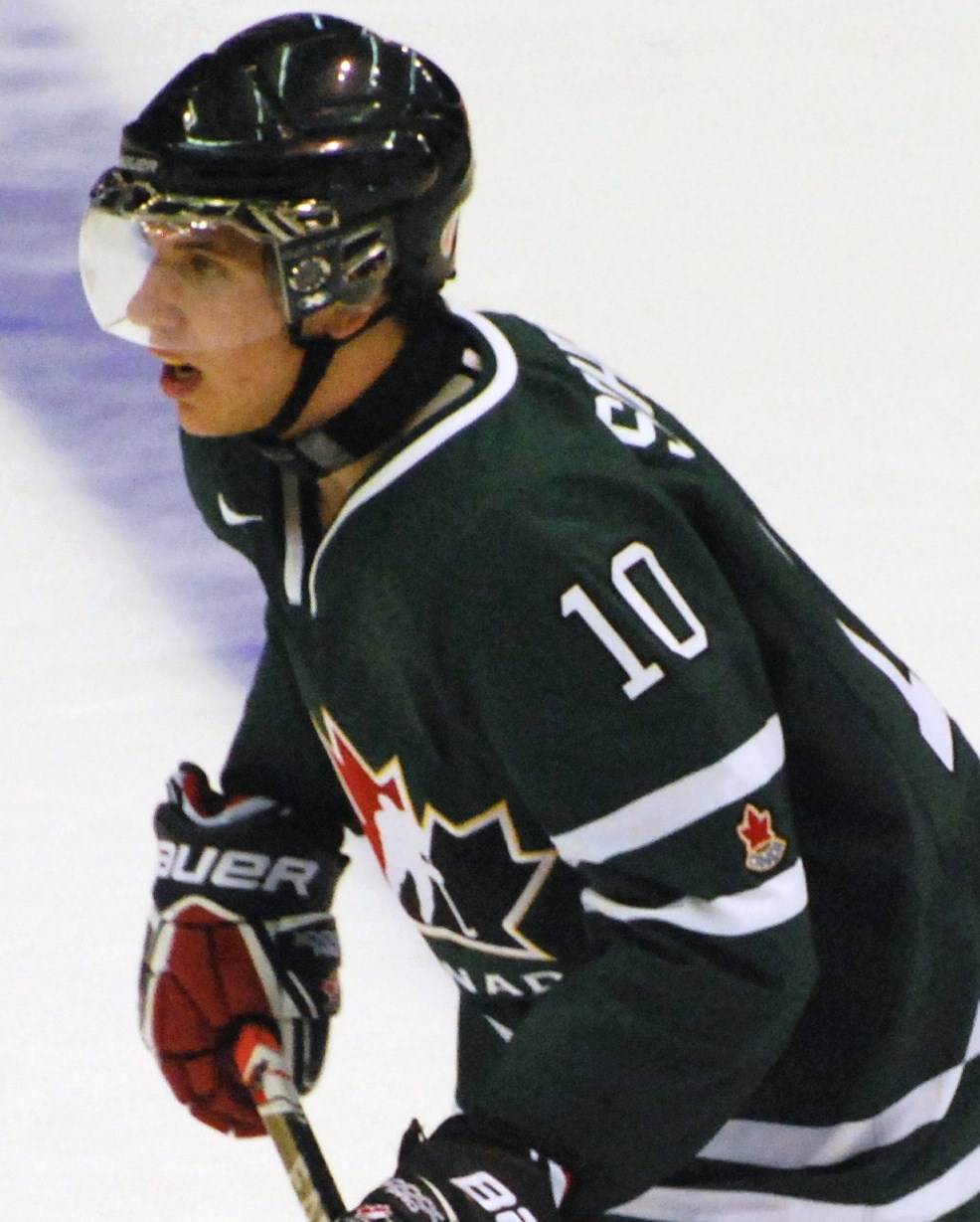
- Schenn at the 2010 World Junior Championship

Medal record

Men's ice hockey

Representing Canada

World Championships
Gold medal – first place	2015 Czech Republic	
Silver medal – second place	2017 Germany/France	

World Junior Championships
Silver medal – second place	2011 United States	
Silver medal – second place	2010 Canada	

IIHF World U18 Championship
Gold medal – first place	2008 Russia	

Schenn started his Hockey Canada career by representing Saskatchewan at the 2007 Canada Winter Games, where his team finished seventh. During the 2007–08 season, Schenn played for Canada West at the 2008 World U-17 Hockey Challenge, where he was the leading scorer. After his season with Brandon was over, Schenn played for Canada at the 2008 World U18 Championships, as one of five 16-year-olds, capturing a gold medal. He tallied one goal and two assists in seven games in the tournament. During the summer, he also competed in the 2008 Ivan Hlinka Memorial Tournament, earning another gold medal. Schenn served as an alternate captain at the tournament, and recorded six points (two goals and four assists) in four games.

During the 2008–09 season, Schenn was invited to Canada's tryout camp for the 2009 World Junior Championships, but did not make the final squad. Schenn was invited to Hockey Canada's summer evaluation camp in August 2009, and also to the December selection camp for the 2010 World Junior Championships. He made the team and competed in the tournament that was hosted in his home province of Saskatchewan. Schenn won a silver medal with Canada, after they lost the gold medal game in overtime to the United States team.

When the Kings returned Schenn to the WHL in December 2010, it allowed him to try out for Canada's team at the 2011 World Junior Championships. Schenn made the team after the December selection camp, and was selected as one of the alternate captains. In Canada's preliminary round game against the Czech Republic, Schenn was named player of the game. Against Norway, Schenn tied Canada's record for goals in a single game (held by Mario Lemieux and Simon Gagné) with four. He also added an assist to finish the game with five points. In Canada's gold medal loss to Russia, Schenn scored a goal and added an assist. He recorded 18 points in the tournament, tying Canada's all-time record for a single tournament, set by Dale McCourt in 1977. After the tournament, Schenn was the tournament's top scorer, and was named to the media All-Star team for the event. The IIHF Directorate named him Best Forward and Tournament MVP. Canada's coaching staff selected him as one of the team's top three players for the tournament. At the end of the tournament, it was revealed that Schenn had been playing with a separated shoulder he suffered during Canada's quarterfinal victory against Switzerland.

== Personal life ==
Schenn was born in Saskatoon, Saskatchewan, to Jeff and Rita Schenn. His older brother, Luke, is a defenceman for the Vancouver Canucks.. They have two younger sisters, Madison and Macy.

== Career statistics ==
=== Regular season and playoffs ===
			Regular season					Playoffs
Season	Team	League	GP	G	A	Pts	PIM	GP	G	A	Pts	PIM
2006–07	Saskatoon Contacts AAA	SMHL	41	27	43	70	63	3	4	3	7	4
2007–08	Brandon Wheat Kings	WHL	66	28	43	71	48	6	2	1	3	14
2008–09	Brandon Wheat Kings	WHL	70	32	56	88	82	12	8	10	18	12
2009–10	Los Angeles Kings	NHL	1	0	0	0	0	—	—	—	—	—
2009–10	Brandon Wheat Kings	WHL	59	34	65	99	55	15	8	11	19	2
2010–11	Los Angeles Kings	NHL	8	0	2	2	0	—	—	—	—	—
2010–11	Manchester Monarchs	AHL	7	3	4	7	4	5	1	3	4	0
2010–11	Brandon Wheat Kings	WHL	1	3	4	2	—	—	—	—	—
2010–11	Saskatoon Blades	WHL	27	21	32	53	23	10	6	5	11	14
2011–12	Adirondack Phantoms	AHL	7	6	6	12	4	—	—	—	—	—
2011–12	Philadelphia Flyers	NHL	54	12	6	18	34	11	3	6	9	8
2012–13	Adirondack Phantoms	AHL	33	13	20	33	15	—	—	—	—	—
2012–13	Philadelphia Flyers	NHL	47	8	18	26	24	—	—	—	—	—
2013–14	Philadelphia Flyers	NHL	82	20	21	41	54	7	0	3	3	8
2014–15	Philadelphia Flyers	NHL	82	18	29	47	34	—	—	—	—	—
2015–16	Philadelphia Flyers	NHL	80	26	33	59	33	6	0	2	2	7
2016–17	Philadelphia Flyers	NHL	79	25	30	55	38	—	—	—	—	—
2017–18	St. Louis Blues	NHL	82	28	42	70	56	—	—	—	—	—
2018–19	St. Louis Blues	NHL	72	17	37	54	40	26	5	7	12	14
2019–20	St. Louis Blues	NHL	71	25	33	58	44	9	2	3	5	6
2020–21	St. Louis Blues	NHL	56	16	20	36	35	4	1	0	1	9
2021–22	St. Louis Blues	NHL	62	24	34	58	33	12	0	8	8	14
2022–23	St. Louis Blues	NHL	82	21	44	65	50	—	—	—	—	—
2023–24	St. Louis Blues	NHL	82	20	26	46	56	—	—	—	—	—
2024–25	St. Louis Blues	NHL	82	18	32	50	61	7	2	1	3	30
2025–26	St. Louis Blues	NHL	61	12	16	28	49	—	—	—	—	—
2025–26	New York Islanders	NHL	19	6	5	11	19	—	—	—	—	—
NHL totals			1,102	296	428	724	660	82	13	30	43	96

=== International ===
Year	Team	Event	Results	GP	G	A	Pts	PIM
2008	Canada Western	U17	3rd place, bronze medalist(s)	6	6	7	13	4
2008	Canada	U18	1st place, gold medalist(s)	7	1	2	3	6
2008	Canada	IH18	1st place, gold medalist(s)	4	3	4	7	4
2010	Canada	WJC	2nd place, silver medalist(s)	6	2	6	8	4
2011	Canada	WJC	2nd place, silver medalist(s)	7	8	10	18	0
2014	Canada	WC	5th	7	3	1	4	0
2015	Canada	WC	1st place, gold medalist(s)	2	1	0	1	4
2017	Canada	WC	2nd place, silver medalist(s)	10	1	0	1	2
2018	Canada	WC	4th	10	2	3	5	0
2025	Canada	WC	5th	8	0	1	1	2
Junior totals				30	20	29	49	18
Senior totals				38	7	5	12	8

== Awards and honours ==
=== Junior ===
Award	Year
Brandon Wheat Kings Rookie of the Year	2008
Brandon Wheat Kings Most Popular Player	2008
Boston Pizza WHL Fan's Choice Award	2008
Jim Piggott Memorial Trophy	2008
WHL Player of the Week (January 11–18)	2009
CHL Player of the Week (January 11–18)	2009
WHL East Second Team All-Star	2009 2011
WHL East First Team All-Star	2010

=== NHL ===
Award	Year	Ref
National Hockey League All-Star Game	2018	
Stanley Cup champion	2019	

=== International ===
Award	Year
World Junior Player of the Game	Round Robin vs. Czech Republic, 2011
World Junior Top Three Player for Team Canada	2011
World Junior All-Star Team	2011
World Junior Best Forward	2011
World Junior Most Valuable Player	2011

=== Other ===
Award	Year
H.L. (Krug) Crawford Memorial Medal	2009

Awards and achievements
Preceded by Colten Teubert	Los Angeles Kings first-round draft pick 2009	Succeeded by Derek Forbort
Sporting positions
Preceded by Ryan O'Reilly	St. Louis Blues captain 2023–2026	Succeeded by Robert Thomas
