= Richard Seeley =

Canadian ice hockey player

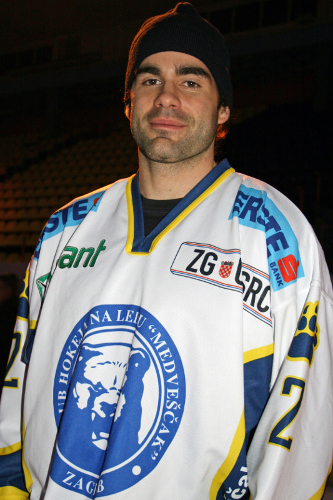
- Born: April 30, 1979 (age 47) Powell River, British Columbia, Canada
- Height: 6 ft 3 in (191 cm)
- Weight: 217 lb (98 kg; 15 st 7 lb)
- Position: Defenceman
- Shot: Left
- Played for: AHL; Lowell Lock Monsters; Manchester Monarchs; Bridgeport Sound Tigers; Norfolk Admirals; DEL; Füchse Duisburg; EBEL; Vienna Capitals; EHC Black Wings Linz; KHL Medveščak Zagreb; EIHL; Belfast Giants
- NHL draft: 137th overall, 1997; Los Angeles Kings
- Playing career: 1999–2011

Richard Seeley (born April 30, 1979) is a Canadian former ice hockey defenceman. In June 2026, he was named the general manager of the Abbotsford Canucks and assistant general manager of the Vancouver Canucks.

== Playing career ==
Seeley was drafted in the 6th round, 137th overall, by the Los Angeles Kings in the 1997 NHL entry draft but never played in the NHL. He played mainly for the Lowell Lock Monsters, Manchester Monarchs, Bridgeport Sound Tigers and the Norfolk Admirals. He also had a spell in the East Coast Hockey League with the Trenton Titans. In 2006, he moved to Germany's Deutsche Eishockey Liga and played for Füchse Duisburg. In 2007–08 he played for the Vienna Capitals in Austria and recorded 20 assists for 22 points in 38 games before signing with EHC Black Wings Linz for the 2008–09 season.

On November 10, 2009, Seeley was granted a trial with KHL Medveščak before signing a one-year contract to compete in the 2009–10 season.

On August 4, 2010, Seeley left Croatia and signed a one-year contract with the Belfast Giants in the Elite Ice Hockey League in the U.K. Seeley was named into the Elite League Select team to face the Boston Bruins in an exhibition game on October 2, 2010 in Belfast. His season was cut short due to injury which ended his playing career.

== Coaching and management career ==
In 2015, he returned to the Los Angeles Kings' organization when he was named the head coach of the Manchester Monarchs, their minor league affiliate now in the ECHL. After three seasons and three playoff appearances, he was promoted to the general manager position with the Kings' American Hockey League affiliate, the Ontario Reign, in 2018.

== Career statistics ==
			Regular season					Playoffs
Season	Team	League	GP	G	A	Pts	PIM	GP	G	A	Pts	PIM
1996–97	Lethbridge Hurricanes	WHL	3	0	0	0	11	—	—	—	—	—
1996–97	Prince Albert Raiders	WHL	18	0	1	1	9	4	0	0	0	2
1997–98	Prince Albert Raiders	WHL	65	8	21	29	114	—	—	—	—	—
1998–99	Prince Albert Raiders	WHL	61	10	48	58	110	14	1	11	12	14
1999–2000	Lowell Lock Monsters	AHL	36	5	1	6	37	—	—	—	—	—
2000–01	Trenton Titans	ECHL	9	0	2	2	18	—	—	—	—	—
2000–01	Lowell Lock Monsters	AHL	55	2	8	10	102	—	—	—	—	—
2001–02	Manchester Monarchs	AHL	61	2	10	12	78	5	0	0	0	6
2002–03	Manchester Monarchs	AHL	69	4	14	18	127	3	0	1	1	0
2003–04	Manchester Monarchs	AHL	56	2	9	11	80	6	0	0	0	0
2004–05	Bridgeport Sound Tigers	AHL	47	2	6	8	108	—	—	—	—	—
2004–05	Norfolk Admirals	AHL	12	0	0	0	17	6	1	0	1	8
2005–06	Manchester Monarchs	AHL	63	3	13	16	109	3	0	0	0	19
2006–07	Füchse Duisburg	DEL	48	2	17	19	139	—	—	—	—	—
2007–08	Vienna Capitals	EBEL	38	2	20	22	112	7	1	1	2	4
2008–09	EHC Black Wings Linz	EBEL	16	0	4	4	36	—	—	—	—	—
2009–10	KHL Medveščak Zagreb	EBEL	28	1	6	7	69	11	0	0	0	10
2010–11	Belfast Giants	EIHL	12	1	9	10	18	—	—	—	—	—
AHL totals			399	20	61	81	658	23	1	1	2	33
