= Brendan Buckley =

American ice hockey player and coach

- Born: February 26, 1977 (age 49) Needham, Massachusetts, U.S.
- Height: 6 ft 2 in (188 cm)
- Weight: 210 lb (95 kg; 15 st 0 lb)
- Position: Defense
- Shot: Right
- Played for: UHL; Quad City Mallards; AHL; Cincinnati Mighty Ducks; Wilkes-Barre/Scranton Penguins; Syracuse Crunch; Worcester IceCats; Peoria Rivermen; Manchester Monarchs; Worcester Sharks; Chicago Wolves; Europe; Iserlohn Roosters (DEL); EHC Linz (Austria); Ritten Sport (Serie A)
- NHL draft: 117th overall, 1996; Mighty Ducks of Anaheim
- Playing career: 1999–2011 Coaching career

Current position
- Title: Associate head coach
- Team: Boston College
- Conference: Hockey East

Biographical details
- Education: Boston College

Coaching career (HC unless noted)
- 2015–2018: Connecticut (assistant)
- 2018–Present: Boston College (associate)

Brendan Buckley (born February 26, 1977) is an American former professional ice hockey defenseman. He is currently an assistant coach for the Boston College Eagles.

== Career ==
Buckley was drafted 117th overall by the Mighty Ducks of Anaheim in the 1996 NHL entry draft from Boston College. Although he never played in the NHL, Buckley played 569 regular-season games in the American Hockey League for the Cincinnati Mighty Ducks, Wilkes-Barre/Scranton Penguins, Syracuse Crunch, Worcester IceCats, Peoria Rivermen, Manchester Monarchs, Worcester Sharks, and Chicago Wolves.

After retiring from professional hockey in 2011, Buckley joined Buckley Sports Management where he served as vice president and Director of Recruiting. He has also served as the Tier 1 Commissioner and Tournament Director for the Eastern Hockey Federation in Boston since 2012. On July 8, 2015, Buckley became an assistant coach for the University of Connecticut men's hockey team. In 2018, he returned to Boston College as an assistant coach.

== Career statistics ==
			Regular season					Playoffs
Season	Team	League	GP	G	A	Pts	PIM	GP	G	A	Pts	PIM
1995–96	Boston College	NCAA	36	0	4	4	72	—	—	—	—	—
1996–97	Boston College	NCAA	38	2	6	8	90	—	—	—	—	—
1997–98	Boston College	NCAA	41	1	12	13	69	—	—	—	—	—
1998–99	Boston College	NCAA	43	1	13	14	75	—	—	—	—	—
1999–00	Cincinnati Mighty Ducks	AHL	4	0	0	0	6	—	—	—	—	—
1999–00	Quad City Mallards	UHL	61	1	10	11	73	9	1	0	1	10
2000–01	Wilkes-Barre/Scranton Penguins	AHL	63	2	8	10	62	21	0	2	2	33
2001–02	Wilkes-Barre/Scranton Penguins	AHL	80	1	19	20	116	—	—	—	—	—
2002–03	Wilkes-Barre/Scranton Penguins	AHL	80	2	6	8	99	6	0	0	0	2
2003–04	Wilkes-Barre/Scranton Penguins	AHL	45	2	4	6	61	—	—	—	—	—
2003–04	Syracuse Crunch	AHL	30	0	4	4	40	7	0	0	0	14
2004–05	Worcester IceCats	AHL	63	3	13	16	128	—	—	—	—	—
2005–06	Peoria Rivermen	AHL	73	2	9	11	104	4	0	0	0	4
2006–07	Manchester Monarchs	AHL	63	2	7	9	107	16	0	3	3	13
2007–08	Iserlohn Roosters	DEL	43	0	4	4	119	6	1	0	1	31
2008–09	Worcester Sharks	AHL	67	1	8	9	92	10	1	2	3	18
2009–10	Chicago Wolves	AHL	1	0	0	0	0	—	—	—	—	—
2009–10	Black Wings Linz	EBEL	29	2	6	8	60	18	1	2	3	38
2010–11	Ritten Sport	Italy	40	2	18	20	58	5	0	1	1	0
AHL totals			569	15	78	93	815	64	1	7	8	84
