= Davis Drewiske =

American ice hockey player (born 1984)

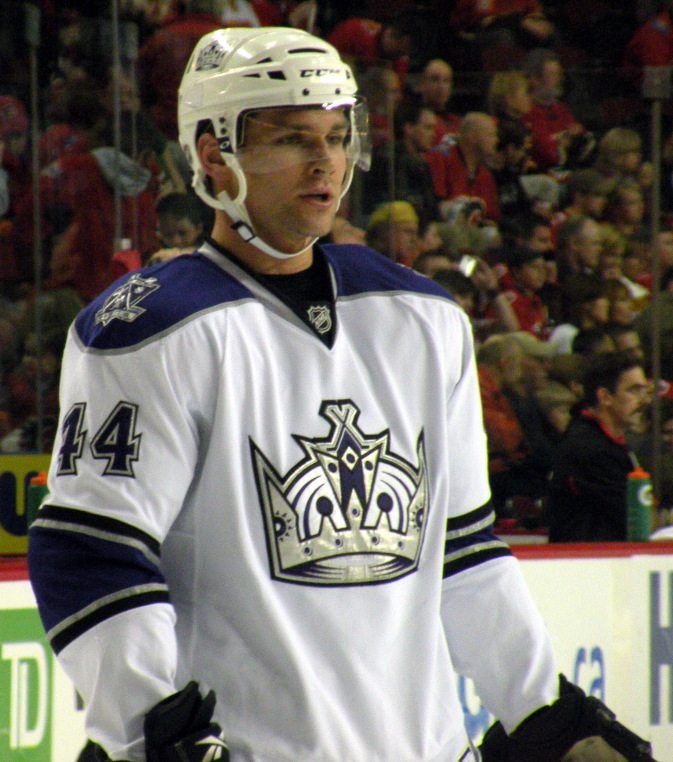
- Drewiske with the Los Angeles Kings in 2009
- Born: November 22, 1984 (age 41) Hudson, Wisconsin, U.S.
- Height: 6 ft 1 in (185 cm)
- Weight: 220 lb (100 kg; 15 st 10 lb)
- Position: Defense
- Shot: Left
- Played for: Los Angeles Kings; Montreal Canadiens
- NHL draft: Undrafted
- Playing career: 2008–2016

Davis Anthony Drewiske (born November 22, 1984) is an American former professional ice hockey defenseman who played in the National Hockey League (NHL) with the Los Angeles Kings and Montreal Canadiens.

== Playing career ==
Davis played his youth hockey for the Hudson Raiders Youth Hockey Association. Drewiske attended High School in Hudson, Wisconsin. His accomplishments included 1 State title and was the recipient of the Wisconsin High School Mr. Hockey Award in 2003 having successfully recovered from a neck fracture in the previous season.

Undrafted, Drewiske started his junior career with Des Moines Buccaneers of the USHL before joining the University of Wisconsin in the Western Collegiate Hockey Association. Drewiske captained and tied for first on the team in goals for defenseman in his last season with the Badgers.

On April 1, 2008, Drewiske signed an entry-level contract with the Los Angeles Kings. He was then assigned to affiliate, the Manchester Monarchs of the American Hockey League for the end of the 2007–08 season. Drewiske started the 2008–09 season with the Monarchs before receiving his first call up to the Kings on February 2, 2009. Drewiske made his NHL debut in a 1-0 win against the Ottawa Senators on February 3, 2009. His first NHL goal was an empty net goal to seal a 6-4 win on October 6, 2009 against the San Jose Sharks. His name appears on the Stanley Cup as a member of the 2012 Los Angeles Kings.

During the lockout shortened 2012–13 season, Drewiske was traded by the Kings to the Montreal Canadiens in exchange for a fifth round pick in the 2013 NHL Draft on April 2, 2013.

On June 13, 2013, he signed a two-year contract extension with the Canadiens. In the 2013–14 season, Drewiske's campaign was blighted due to injury, limiting him to just 21 games with AHL affiliate, the Hamilton Bulldogs. Unable to feature in a game with the Canadiens after signing his contract extension, Drewiske left as a free agent following the 2014–15 season.

On July 1, 2015, Drewiske signed a one-year, two-way contract with the Philadelphia Flyers. He was assigned to lead AHL affiliate, the Lehigh Valley Phantoms, in the 2015–16 season. Contributing with 14 points in 73 games, Drewiske ended his 8-year professional career as the Phantoms missed the post-season.

Drewiske over the course of his career, donated and spent significant time with local charities. With each of his three clubs in the AHL, he was nominated for the AHL's Man of the Year award.

== Career statistics ==
			Regular season					Playoffs
Season	Team	League	GP	G	A	Pts	PIM	GP	G	A	Pts	PIM
2003–04	Des Moines Buccaneers	USHL	60	4	19	23	63	3	0	0	0	4
2004–05	U. of Wisconsin	WCHA	34	1	5	6	20	—	—	—	—	—
2005–06	U. of Wisconsin	WCHA	37	2	2	4	24	—	—	—	—	—
2006–07	U. of Wisconsin	WCHA	41	4	6	10	46	—	—	—	—	—
2007–08	U. of Wisconsin	WCHA	40	5	16	21	46	—	—	—	—	—
2007–08	Manchester Monarchs	AHL	5	0	0	0	6	4	0	1	1	6
2008–09	Manchester Monarchs	AHL	61	1	13	14	95	—	—	—	—	—
2008–09	Los Angeles Kings	NHL	17	0	3	3	18	—	—	—	—	—
2009–10	Los Angeles Kings	NHL	42	1	7	8	14	—	—	—	—	—
2010–11	Los Angeles Kings	NHL	38	0	5	5	19	—	—	—	—	—
2011–12	Los Angeles Kings	NHL	9	2	0	2	2	—	—	—	—	—
2012–13	Los Angeles Kings	NHL	20	1	3	4	14	—	—	—	—	—
2012–13	Montreal Canadiens	NHL	9	1	2	3	0	—	—	—	—	—
2013–14	Hamilton Bulldogs	AHL	21	0	3	3	8	—	—	—	—	—
2014–15	Hamilton Bulldogs	AHL	62	4	18	22	28	—	—	—	—	—
2015–16	Lehigh Valley Phantoms	AHL	73	5	9	14	16	—	—	—	—	—
NHL totals			135	5	20	25	67	—	—	—	—	—
