= Kevin Westgarth =

Canadian ice hockey player

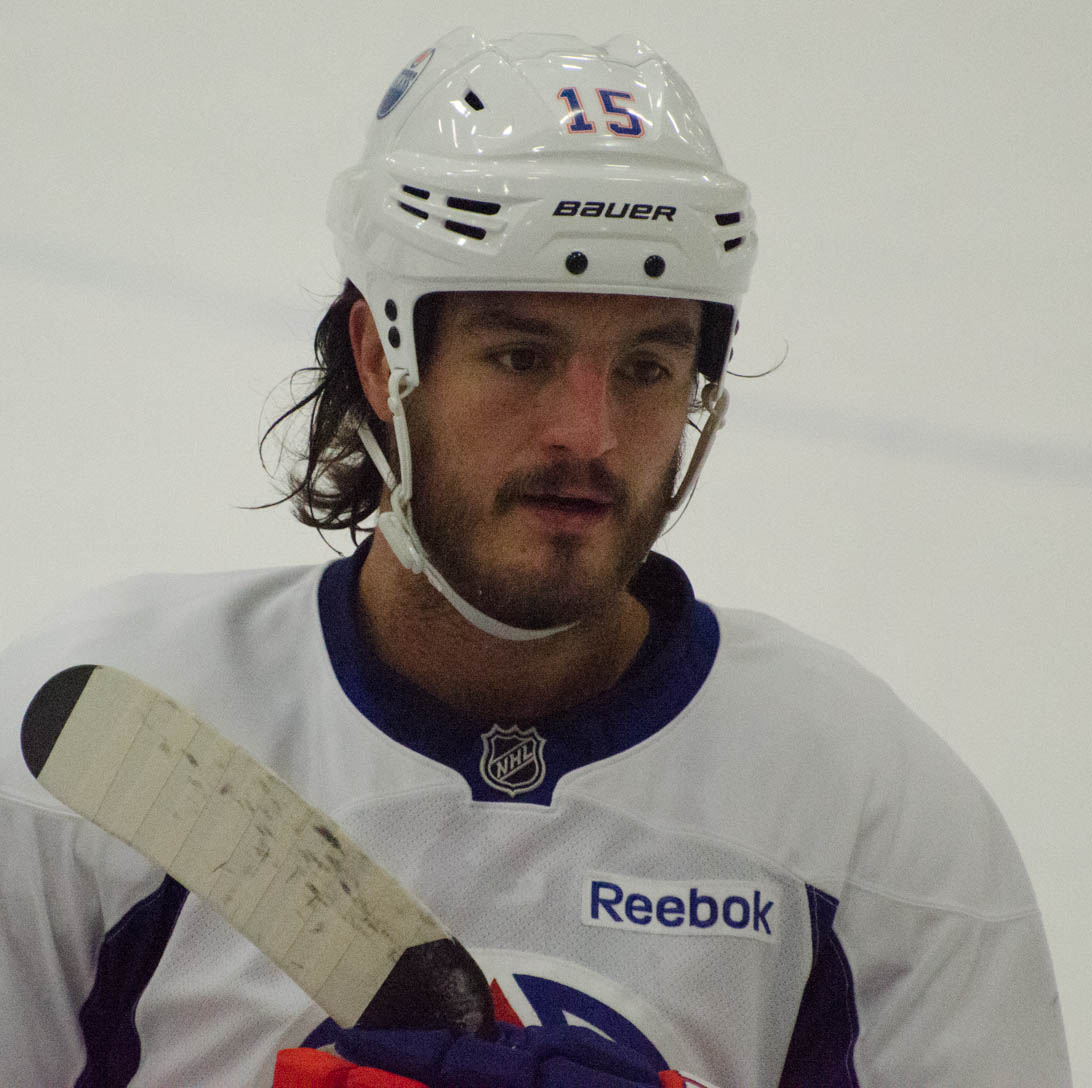
- Westgarth with the Edmonton Oilers in 2014
- Born: February 7, 1984 (age 42) Amherstburg, Ontario, Canada
- Height: 6 ft 4 in (193 cm)
- Weight: 228 lb (103 kg; 16 st 4 lb)
- Position: Right wing
- Shot: Right
- Played for: Los Angeles Kings; Carolina Hurricanes; Calgary Flames
- NHL draft: Undrafted
- Playing career: 2006–2015

Kevin Reginald Westgarth (born February 7, 1984) is a Canadian former professional ice hockey forward who played five seasons in the National Hockey League (NHL) for the Los Angeles Kings, Carolina Hurricanes, and Calgary Flames. Westgarth mainly played as an enforcer, as evidenced by his NHL career statistics of only 16 points and 266 penalty minutes in 169 games.

== Early life ==
Westgarth was born on February 7, 1984, in Amherstburg, Ontario, to Reg and Gilda Westgarth. His older brother Brett played in the American Hockey League (AHL) for four seasons. At age two, he began skating outdoors and eventually transitioned into ice hockey. He attended General Amherst High School, where he participated in ice hockey, soccer, tennis, and golf.

== Playing career ==
=== Amateur ===
Along with partaking in high school hockey, Westgarth played with the Chatham Maroons in the Western Ontario Hockey League. He played two seasons with the Maroons from 2001 to 2003. In his first season with the Maroons, he recorded 14 goals and 14 assists in 48 games. He had also accumulated 125 penalty minutes, the second highest on the team. Despite his enforcer playstyle, he was the Maroons' Academic Player of the Year for the 2001–02 season and was awarded the Barry Wiseman Memorial Award for on-ice and academic performance. In his second season with the Maroons, Westgarth had 9 goals and 7 assists in 21 games. His performance with the Maroons along with his academics earned him a scholarship from the Princeton Tigers.

=== College ===
Westgarth accepted the scholarship from Princeton University as a major in psychology. Joining the team as a freshman, he was placed on the fourth line with senior Dan Hursh and fellow freshman Ian McNally. At 6 feet 4 inches (193 cm) and 235 pounds (107 kilograms), he was the tallest and heaviest player on the Princeton team. In his first year at Princeton, he was eligible for the 2004 NHL entry draft, where he was ranked 34 out of 35 skaters in U.S. college hockey by the NHL Central Scouting Bureau. On November 14, 2003, he scored his first collegiate goal against the Harvard Crimson in a 4–2 win. At the 2004 ECAC Hockey men's ice hockey tournament, 12-seed Princeton was knocked out by 5-seed Rensselaer, ending the season with a 7–24–2 record. In 25 games, he recorded 3 goals and 3 assists, along with leading the Tigers in penalty minutes with 48. Westgarth would go undrafted in the 2004 NHL entry draft.

In his second year with Princeton, he was moved up to the third line with junior Sebastian Borza and freshman Landis Stankievech. Westgarth was still the tallest and heaviest player on the team, gaining 10 pounds (4.5 kilograms) over the offseason to reach 245 pounds (111 kilograms). In the season opener against the St. Cloud State Huskies, he scored a slapshot goal in the second period; Princeton lost 2–7. During the 2004–05 NHL lockout, Philadelphia Flyers head coach Ken Hitchcock joined Princeton as a volunteer assistant coach, with Westgarth commenting that he had an effect on the team's play style. Princeton entered the 2005 ECAC Hockey men's ice hockey tournament as a 10-seed paired against 7-seed St. Lawrence, a series they would lose in two games for a 9–20–3 record. In 29 games, Westgarth would have 4 goals and 3 assists.

Westgarth began the 2005–06 season with three assists in the season-opener against Notre Dame on October 29, 2005. On the December 30 game against defending national champions Denver, he scored a goal and an assist to help Princeton win 4–1, knocking Denver out of the NCAA Division I men's ice hockey tournament for the first time in six years. With the help of Westgarth, Princeton entered the 2006 ECAC Hockey men's ice hockey tournament as the 9-seed against 8-seed Clarkson, another series which Princeton lost in two games, leading Princeton to a 11–18–3 record. At the end of the season, he had scored 10 goals and 13 assists in 29 games, an improvement on his point total from 7 the previous season to 23. He would also lead the Tigers in shots on goal and second on the team in plus/minus.

During the offseason, Westgarth attended NHL camps; in June, he attended a New York Rangers developmental camp and in September, he and his brother Brett attended the Philadelphia Flyers rookie conditioning camp. In the season-opener against Bentley, he scored a goal in the first period in 3–4 loss, marking the third year in a row where he would score a goal in the season-opener. By mid-November, he had six points, leading Princeton alongside Mark Magnowski who also had six points. On February 23, 2007, he had a five-point night against Clarkson in a 7–1 win. For his performance, he was named one of the three ECAC Players of the Week. Princeton entered the 2007 ECAC Hockey men's ice hockey tournament as the 6-seed in the quarterfinals against 3-seed Dartmouth, a series they would lose in two games. Throughout the season and the ECAC Hockey tournament, the Los Angeles Kings had been watching Westgarth and once the tournament ended, the Kings called Westgarth's family advisor to sign him.

=== Professional ===
==== Los Angeles Kings ====
On March 16, 2007, the Kings signed Westgarth to a multi-year, two-way contract. Immediately following the signing, he was assigned to their American Hockey League (AHL) affiliate, the Manchester Monarchs. He made his professional debut on March 18, 2007 with the Monarchs, just two days after signing with the Kings, against the Providence Bruins. During the game, he had his first professional fight against Bruins defenceman Dwayne Zinger, in which Westgarth was considered the winner of the fight. He would play 14 games in the 2006–07 AHL season, ending it with 1 goal and 2 assists for a total of 3 points and accumulated 44 penalty minutes.

During his first full season in Manchester, 2007–2008, Westgarth was second among all AHL rookies in penalty minutes with 191, and led all rookies with 25 major penalties. Westgarth made his NHL debut for the Kings on January 20, 2009 logging 4:39 of ice-time on the road against the Minnesota Wild. Westgarth was recalled from Manchester twice during the season. In his first game back with Manchester on January 23, Westgarth fought Garrett Klotz of the Philadelphia Phantoms, forcing Klotz to leave the ice on a stretcher after suffering seizures following multiple punches to the face from Westgarth. Westgarth's best season in the AHL came in the 2009-2010 season as the forward scored 11 goals and tallied 25 points in 76 games, as just one of seven players in the AHL to have 25 points and more than 150 penalty minutes during the season.

Westgarth's strong campaign earned him a roster spot with the Kings in the fall of 2010, as the enforcer for head coach Terry Murray. Westgarth's first fight of the preseason resulted in facial fractures for Colorado Avalanche winger David Koci on September 22. Through 30 games, Westgarth led the Kings in penalty minutes with 59, after a number of fights with fellow NHL enforcers, such as John Scott of the Chicago Blackhawks. Late in game four in the playoffs against the San Jose Sharks, Westgarth was ejected with a game misconduct for charging.

During the 2011–12 season, Westgarth scored his first NHL goal against Kari Lehtonen in a 3-2 overtime loss to the Dallas Stars on November 23, 2011. On February 16, 2012, Westgarth suffered a hand injury, placing him on the long term injury list for the remainder of the season. With the Kings franchise subsequently earning their first Stanley Cup in the club's forty-five-year history, and despite only playing in 25 regular season games, Westgarth was acknowledged as a Stanley Cup winner and had his name engraved on the cup.

==== Carolina Hurricanes ====
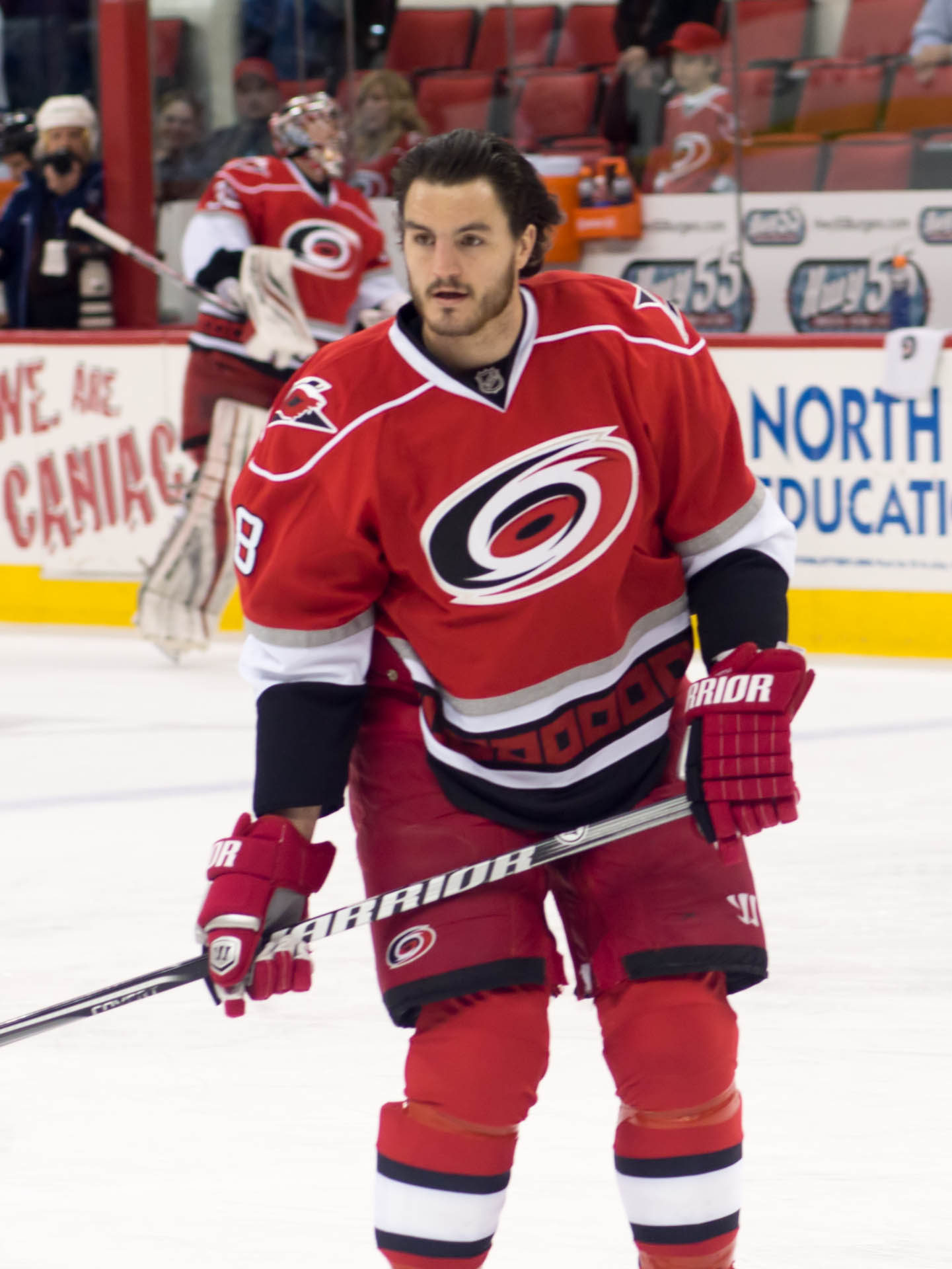
Westgarth as a member of the Hurricanes.

During the 2012-13 NHL lockout, Westgarth stayed at his offseason home in North Carolina and practiced with several members of the Carolina Hurricanes while participating in NHLPA negotiations with the league on a new collective bargaining agreement. Upon ratification of the new agreement, the Kings promptly traded him to the Hurricanes for Anthony Stewart, a 2013 fourth-round pick and a 2014 sixth-round pick on January 13, 2013.

==== Calgary Flames ====
On December 30, 2013, Westgarth was traded by the Hurricanes to the Calgary Flames in exchange for Greg Nemisz. In the remainder of the 2013–14 season, Westgarth enjoyed his most productive period of his NHL career, in scoring a career high 4 goals and 7 points in 36 games.

With the Flames opting to not tender Westgarth a new offer, he was released to free agency at season's end. Without a contract heading into the 2014–15 season, Westgarth accepted an invitation to try out at the Edmonton Oilers training camp. On October 5, 2014, he was released from the Oilers pre-season roster and later opted to sign a one-year contract with Northern Irish club, the Belfast Giants of the EIHL on October 30, 2014.

== Personal life ==
Kevin is married to Meagan Westgarth (née Cowher), daughter of former NFL head coach Bill Cowher. They met while attending Princeton University, where Meaghan played on the varsity basketball team. They were wed in 2011, and make their home in Brooklyn, New York. Through his marriage, Westgarth is the brother-in-law of former Atlanta Hawks player, Ryan Kelly.

== Career statistics ==
			Regular season					Playoffs
Season	Team	League	GP	G	A	Pts	PIM	GP	G	A	Pts	PIM
2003–04	Princeton University	ECAC	25	3	3	6	48	—	—	—	—	—
2004–05	Princeton University	ECAC	29	4	3	7	36	—	—	—	—	—
2005–06	Princeton University	ECAC	29	10	13	23	36	—	—	—	—	—
2006–07	Princeton University	ECAC	33	8	16	24	40	—	—	—	—	—
2006–07	Manchester Monarchs	AHL	14	1	2	3	44	—	—	—	—	—
2007–08	Manchester Monarchs	AHL	69	6	6	12	191	4	0	0	0	6
2008–09	Manchester Monarchs	AHL	65	4	6	10	165	—	—	—	—	—
2008–09	Los Angeles Kings	NHL	9	0	0	0	9	—	—	—	—	—
2009–10	Manchester Monarchs	AHL	76	11	14	25	180	6	1	0	1	10
2010–11	Los Angeles Kings	NHL	56	0	3	3	105	6	0	2	2	14
2011–12	Los Angeles Kings	NHL	25	1	1	2	39	—	—	—	—	—
2012–13	Carolina Hurricanes	NHL	31	2	2	4	45	—	—	—	—	—
2013–14	Carolina Hurricanes	NHL	12	0	0	0	4	—	—	—	—	—
2013–14	Calgary Flames	NHL	36	4	3	7	64	—	—	—	—	—
2014–15	Belfast Giants	EIHL	36	13	7	20	87	4	0	0	0	4
NHL totals			169	7	9	16	266	6	0	2	2	14

== Awards and honours ==
Awards	Year
NHL
Stanley Cup champion	2012
