= Manchester Monarchs (AHL) =

Former American Hockey League team in Manchester, New Hampshire

- City: Manchester, New Hampshire
- League: American Hockey League
- Conference: Eastern
- Division: Atlantic
- Founded: 2001
- Operated: 2001–2015
- Home arena: Verizon Wireless Arena
- Colors: Black, silver
- Media: New Hampshire Union Leader; WGIR (610 AM); WMUR-TV (channel 9)
- Affiliates: Los Angeles Kings (NHL); Ontario Reign (ECHL)

Franchise history
- 2001–2015: Manchester Monarchs
- 2015–present: Ontario Reign

Championships
- Regular season titles: 1 (2014–15)
- Division titles: 4 (2004–05, 2006–07, 2013–14, 2014–15)
- Conference titles: 1 (2014–15)
- Calder Cups: 1 (2014–15)

The Manchester Monarchs were a professional ice hockey team in the American Hockey League (AHL). They played in Manchester, New Hampshire, at the Verizon Wireless Arena. They were the AHL affiliate of the National Hockey League (NHL) Los Angeles Kings during the team's entire existence. The Monarchs won their only Calder Cup in their final AHL season.

For the 2015–16 season, the Monarchs traded places with the Kings' affiliate in the ECHL, the Ontario Reign. The AHL franchise moved to Ontario, California, and play at Citizens Business Bank Arena where they became the new Ontario Reign; the ECHL team moved to New Hampshire retaining the Manchester Monarchs name.

== History ==
In 1999, Howard Baldwin founded Manchester Hockey Group LLC, while in the process of moving a dormant AHL franchise to New Hampshire to start play in 2001. On June 14, 2000, the Los Angeles Kings bought the team from Baldwin's group. Three months later, the Kings hired Jeff Eisenberg as team president. The team, to play in the still under construction Verizon Wireless Arena, was baptized Manchester Monarchs on November 13.

Prior to the first game, two members of the Kings organization, Garnet Bailey and Mark Bavis, were killed in the September 11, 2001, terrorist attacks as they were going home back to Los Angeles after a scouting trip. The Monarchs played their first game on October 6, 2001, against the Lowell Lock Monsters, losing 6–3. Their first win was a week later, on October 13, against the Norfolk Admirals. The team has been competitive within the division every year of its existence. They won their first Atlantic Division title in 2004–05, but lost in the first round to the Providence Bruins. This continued the streak of first round playoff exits, which the team had experienced in every year of existence, and would come to include the 2005–06 season.

The 2006–07 campaign was the team's best season prior to 2014–15, the season in which the team won its only Calder Cup championship. With rookie head coach Mark Morris, leading scorers Matt Moulson and Noah Clarke, and former League MVP Jason LaBarbera in goal, the team had its best-ever finish, winning the Atlantic Division title with the second-best points total in the League.

Heading into the playoffs, there were doubts within the team, as goaltender LaBarbera had ended the season injured. The team faced the Worcester Sharks in the first round. With LaBarbera coming back by Game 2, the Monarchs defeated the Sharks in six games, including double-overtime thrillers in Games 2 and 6. The second round brought the Providence Bruins, who put up as much, if not more, of a fight. The Monarchs found a way, however, and defeated the Bruins in six games. This brought the Monarchs to their first ever Eastern Conference Finals, but they were swept by the defending champions, the Hershey Bears, in four games.

Following their run in 2007, the Monarchs looked to have holes to fill, as Jason LaBarbera was called up to the Kings, along with several other players. The 2007–08 season was an up-and-down one, which ended following a sweep by the Providence Bruins in the first round of the playoffs. The 2008–09 season was a landmark year for the franchise, but not in the way they would hope. Despite a late surge, the team finished fifth, five points out of the playoffs, for the first time in franchise history.

The first half of the 2009–10 season proved to be successful for the Monarchs squad. Several players were promoted to Los Angeles, including Richard Clune and Alec Martinez. The Monarchs won their home opener of the 2010–11 season, as David Meckler scored the game-winning goal in front of 9,035 fans at the Verizon Wireless Arena on October 16, 2010. The game was also noteworthy as left wing Brandon Kozun and center Justin Azevedo were awarded penalty shots, the first time in franchise history that two players were awarded penalty shots in the same game.

The Manchester Monarchs have made it to the playoffs all but one season since coming into existence, winning their first Calder Cup following the 2014–15 season.

For the 2014–15 season, the Monarchs ditched their purple and gold (the former Los Angeles Kings' colors) that had been with the team since its inception, and adopted the same black and silver color scheme that the Kings have used since 2011.

On January 29, 2015, it was confirmed by the AHL via press conference that the Monarchs would relocate from Manchester, New Hampshire, to Ontario, California. In return, the Ontario Reign of the ECHL would move to Manchester to become the new ECHL Manchester Monarchs, the first ECHL team to play in New England. The Monarchs finished the regular season winning the Macgregor Kilpatrick Trophy with the best regular season record of the AHL and Brian O'Neill receiving the Les Cunningham Award as Most Valuable Player. The playoffs saw the Monarchs losing only three games among the Eastern teams, leading to the team's first Richard F. Canning Trophy as conference champions to qualify for the Calder Cup Final. The Monarchs beat the Utica Comets 4–1 to win the Calder Cup in their final season in the AHL. They became the first team since the New Brunswick Hawks in 1982 to win the Calder Cup in their last game in the league, and fourth overall (along with the Pittsburgh Hornets in 1967 and the Buffalo Bisons in 1970).

== Players ==
=== Team captains ===
- Dane Jackson, 2001–2003
- Richard Seeley, 2003–2004
- Chris Schmidt, 2004–2005
- Richard Seeley, 2005–2006
- Brendan Buckley, 2006–2007
- Jon Klemm, 2007–2008
- Gabe Gauthier, 2007–2008
- Marty Murray, 2008–2009
- Drew Bagnall, 2009–2010
- Marc-Andre Cliche, 2010–2013
- Andrew Campbell, 2013–2014
- Vincent LoVerde, 2014–15

=== Notable Monarchs ===
- Jonathan Quick
- Justin Azevedo
- Jonathan Bernier
- Paul Bissonnette
- Brian Boyle
- Dustin Brown
- Mike Cammalleri
- Andrew Campbell
- Marc-Andre Cliche
- Kyle Clifford
- Joe Corvo
- Alexandre Daigle
- Ted Donato
- Davis Drewiske
- Mathieu Garon
- Tim Gleason
- Denis Grebeshkov
- Steve Heinze
- Cristobal Huet
- Tim Jackman
- Dwight King
- Tom Kostopoulos
- Jason LaBarbera
- Andrei Loktionov
- Alec Martinez
- Oscar Moller
- Matt Moulson
- Jake Muzzin
- Jordan Nolan
- George Parros
- Teddy Purcell
- Brayden Schenn
- Slava Voynov
- Kevin Westgarth
- Tyler Toffoli
- Tanner Pearson

=== American Hockey League Hall of Famers ===
AHL Hall of Fame Honored Members
Name	Seasons	Induction Year
Bruce Boudreau	2001-05 (head coach)	2009
Brad Smyth	2004-06 (player)	2019

Affiliates

- New York Islanders (1998–2001)
- Los Angeles Kings (1999–2001)
- Carolina Hurricanes (2001–2006)
- Calgary Flames (2003–2005)
- Colorado Avalanche (2005–2006)
- New Jersey Devils (2006–2010)

== Team records ==
=== Season-by-season results ===
Regular Season												Playoffs				
Season	Games	Won	Lost	Ties	OTL	SOL	Points	PCT	Goals for	Goals against	Standing	Year	1st round	2nd round	3rd round	Finals
2001–02	80	38	28	11	3	—	90	.563	236	225	2nd, North	2002	L, 2–3, HFD	—	—	—
2002–03	80	40	23	11	6	—	97	.606	254	209	2nd, North	2003	L, 0–3, BRI	—	—	—
2003–04	80	40	28	7	5	—	92	.575	223	181	2nd, Atlantic	2004	L, 2–4, WOR	—	—	—
2004–05	80	51	21	—	4	4	110	.688	258	176	1st, Atlantic	2005	L, 2–4, PRO	—	—	—
2005–06	80	43	30	—	3	4	93	.581	236	230	3rd, Atlantic	2006	L, 3–4, HFD	—	—	—
2006–07	80	51	21	—	7	1	110	.688	242	182	1st, Atlantic	2007	W, 4–2, WOR	W, 4–2, PRO	L, 0–4, HER	—
2007–08	80	39	31	—	5	5	88	.550	240	228	4th, Atlantic	2008	L, 0–4, PRO	—	—	—
2008–09	80	37	35	—	0	8	82	.513	211	218	5th, Atlantic	2009	Did not qualify			
2009–10	80	43	28	—	3	6	95	.594	213	200	3rd, Atlantic	2010	W, 4–0, POR	W, 4–2, WOR	L, 2–4, HER	—
2010–11	80	44	26	—	4	6	98	.613	255	209	2nd, Atlantic	2011	L, 3–4, BNG	—	—	—
2011–12	76	39	32	—	2	3	83	.546	207	208	2nd, Atlantic	2012	L, 1–3, NOR	—	—	—
2012–13	76	37	32	—	3	4	81	.493	219	209	3rd, Atlantic	2013	L, 1–3, SPR	—	—	—
2013–14	76	48	19	—	3	6	105	.691	244	188	1st, Atlantic	2014	L, 1–3, NOR	—	—	—
2014–15	76	50	17	—	6	3	109	.717	241	176	1st, Atlantic	2015	W, 3–2, POR	W, 4–1, WBS	W, 4–0, HFD	W, 4–1, UTI

=== Single-season records ===
Goals: Mike Cammalleri, 46, (2004–05)
Assists: Mike Cammalleri, 63, (2004–05)
Points: Mike Cammalleri, 109, (2004–05)
Penalty minutes: Joe Rullier, 322, (2004–05)
GAA: Adam Hauser, 1.93, (2004–05)
SV%: Adam Hauser, .933, (2004–05)

=== Career records ===
Career goals: Noah Clarke, 85, (2003–07)
Career assists: Gabe Gauthier, 122, (2007–10)
Career points: Noah Clarke, 199, (2003–07)
Career penalty minutes: Joe Rullier, 844, (2001–05)
Career goaltending wins: Martin Jones, 84, (2010–14)
Career shutouts: Adam Hauser, 15, (2003–06)
Career games: Andrew Campbell, 414, (2009–14)
