= List of Los Angeles Kings players =

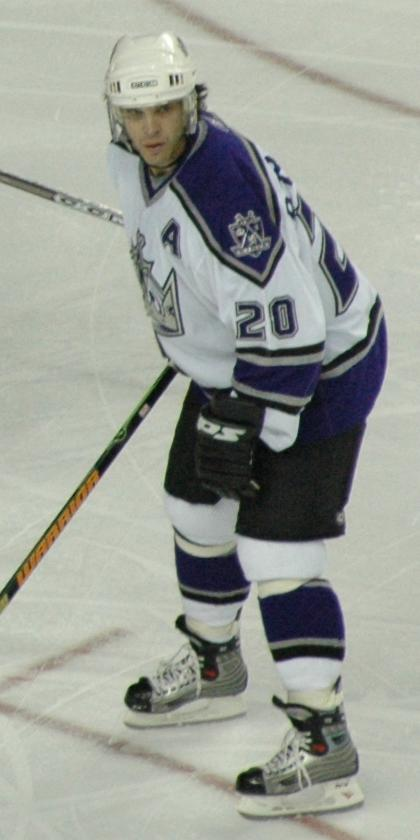
Luc Robitaille is the Kings' all-time leader in goals.

The Los Angeles Kings are a professional ice hockey team based in Los Angeles, California. They are members of the Pacific Division of the Western Conference of the National Hockey League (NHL). This is a list of players who have played at least one game for the Kings.

== Key ==
Appeared in a Kings game during the 2025–26 NHL season or is still part of the organization.
Stanley Cup winner, retired jersey or elected to the Hockey Hall of Fame

Abbreviations
GP	Games played
Ret	Retired number
HHOF	Elected to the Hockey Hall of Fame

Goaltenders
W	Wins
SO	Shutouts
L	Losses
GAA	Goals against average
T	Ties
OTL ^{a}	Overtime losses
SV% ^{b}	Save percentage

Skaters
Pos	Position	RW	Right wing	A	Assists
D	Defenceman	C	Center	P	Points
LW	Left wing	G	Goals	PIM	Penalty minutes

The "Seasons" column lists the first year of the season of the player's first game and the last year of the season of the player's last game. For example, a player who played one game in the 2000–2001 season would be listed as playing with the team from 2000 to 2001, regardless of what calendar year the game occurred within.

Statistics complete as of the 2025–26 NHL season.

== Goaltenders ==
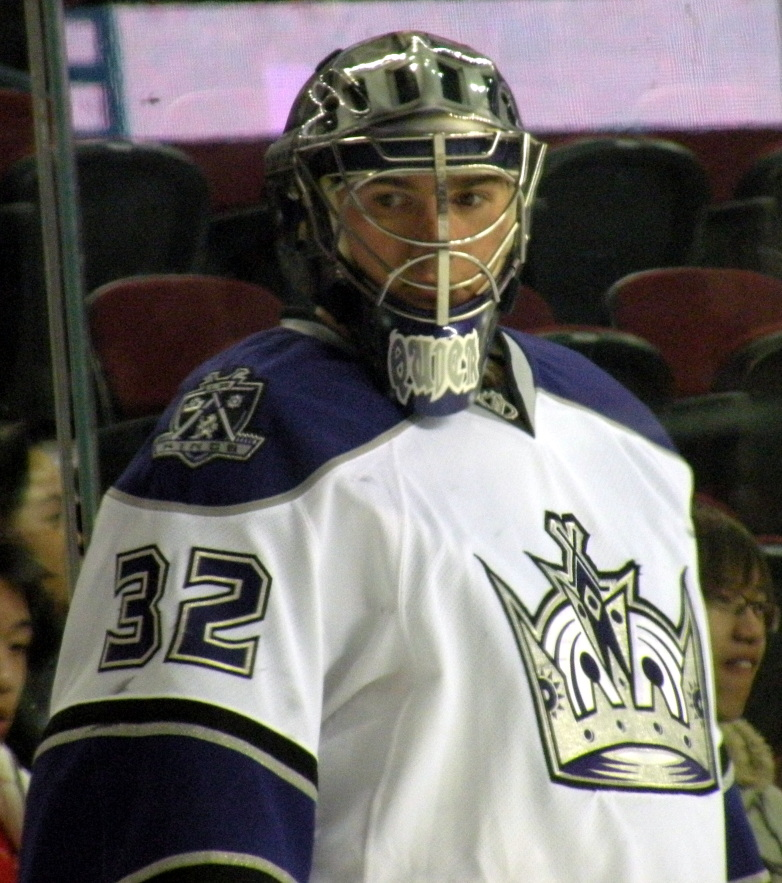
Jonathan Quick won 39 games for the Kings during the 2009–2010 season.

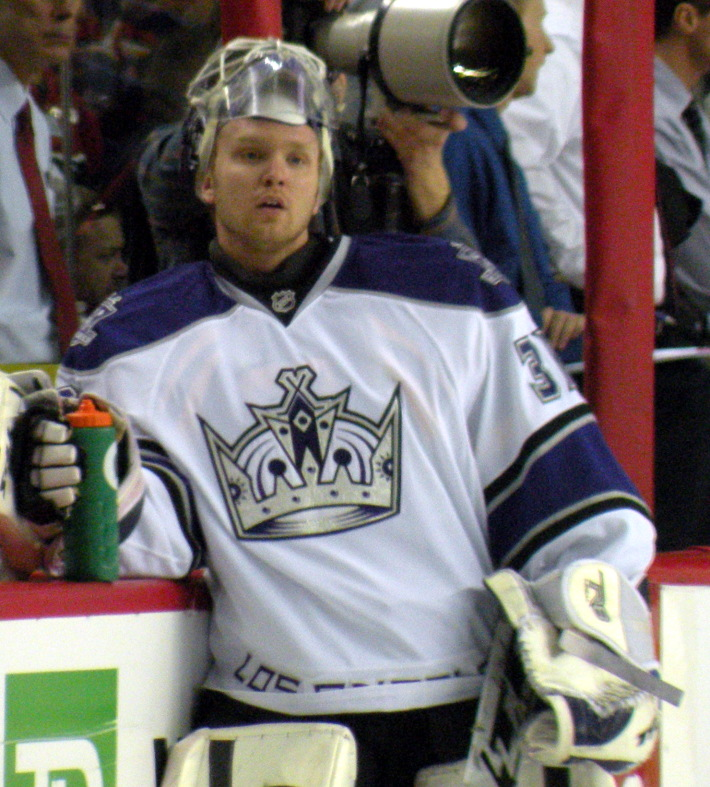
Erik Ersberg appeared in 53 games for the Kings from the 2007–2008 season to 2010.

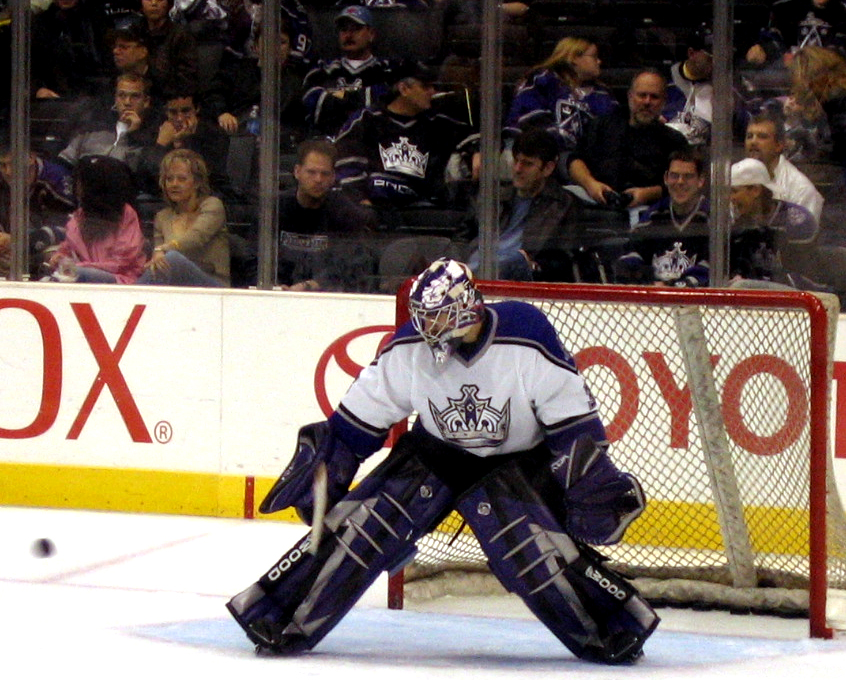
Jason LaBarbera played in a career-high 45 games in 2007–2008.

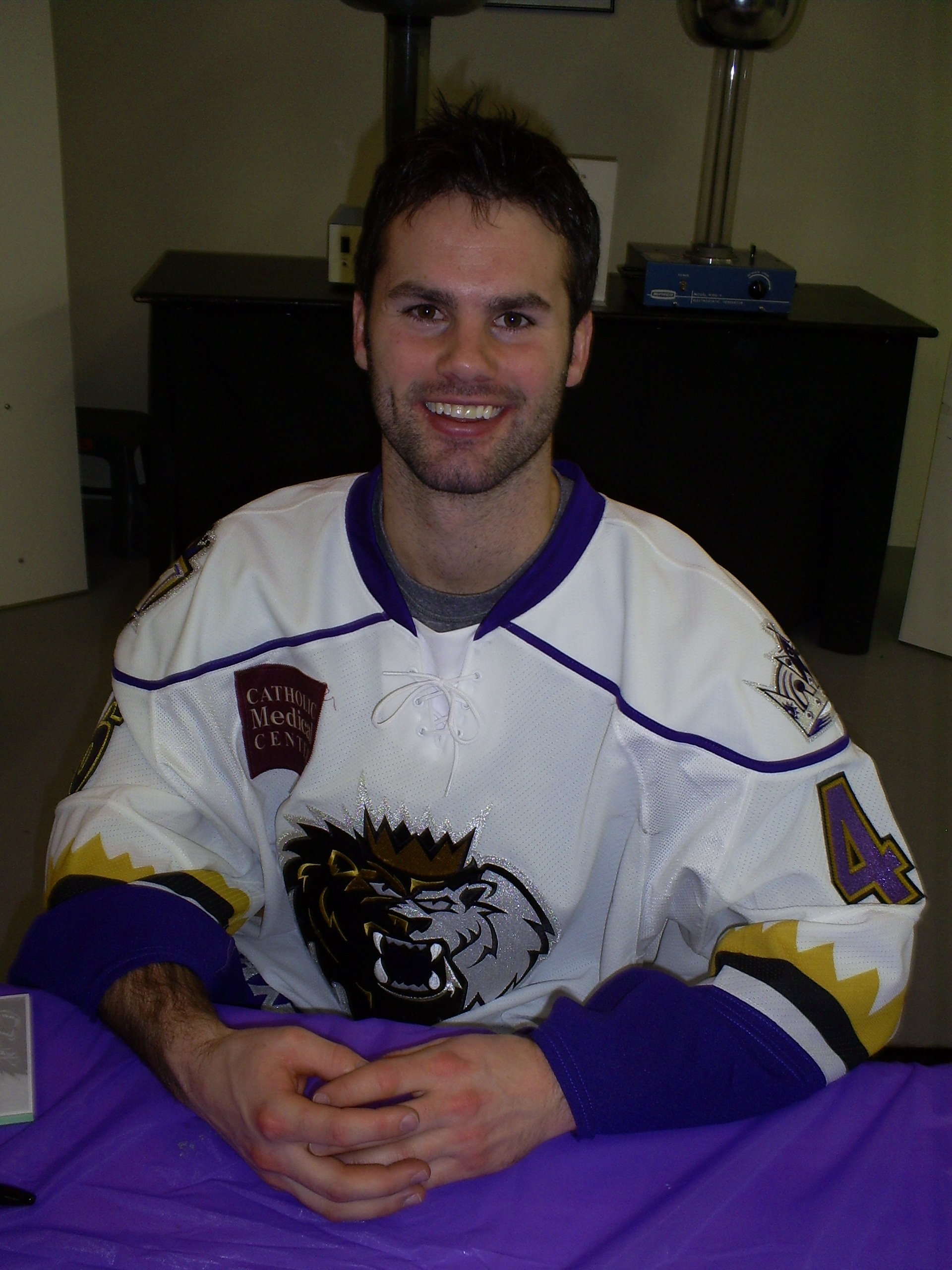
Dan Taylor, shown here signing autographs as a member of the Manchester Monarchs, was a seventh round pick in 2004, who managed to play 1 game in the NHL.

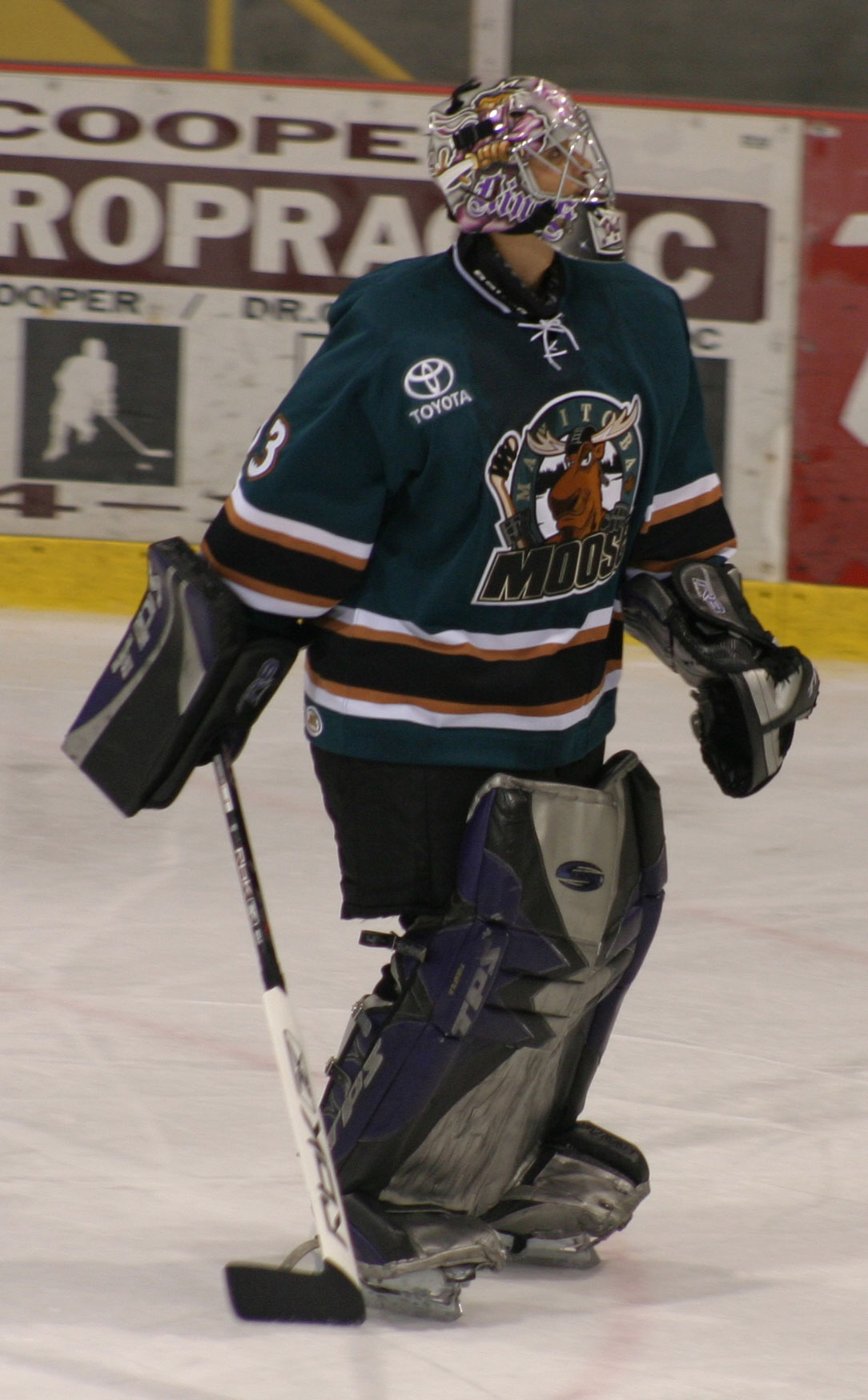
Yutaka Fukufuji, shown here playing for the Manitoba Moose, was the first Japanese born player to play in the NHL.

Name	Nat	Seasons	GP	W	L	T	OTL	SO	GAA	SV%	GP	W	L	SO	GAA	SV%	Notes
Name	Nat	Seasons	Regular season								Playoffs						Notes
Jean-Sebastien Aubin	(Canada)	2007–2008	19	5	6	—	1	0	3.19	.886	—	—	—	—	—	—	
Ryan Bach	(Canada)	1998—1999	3	0	3	0	—	0	4.45	.879	—	—	—	—	—	—	
Marco Baron	(Canada)	1983—1984	21	3	14	4	—	0	4.31	.863	—	—	—	—	—	—	
Jean-Claude Bergeron	(Canada)	1996—1997	1	0	1	0	—	0	4.30	.886	—	—	—	—	—	—	
Jonathan Bernier	(Canada)	2007—2013	62	29	20	—	6	6	2.36	.912	1	0	0	0	0.00	1.000	SC 2012
Daniel Berthiaume	(Canada)	1990—1992	56	27	21	5	—	1	3.54	.888	—	—	—	—	—	—	
Ben Bishop	(United States)	2016—2017	7	2	3	—	2	0	2.49	.900	—	—	—	—	—	—	
Mike Blake	(Canada)	1981—1982	40	13	15	5	—	0	4.25	—	—	—	—	—	—	—	
Barry Brust	(Canada)	2006—2007	11	2	4	—	1	0	4.25	.878	—	—	—	—	—	—	
Peter Budaj	(Slovakia)	2015—2017; 2018—2019	57	28	21	—	3	7	2.22	.913	—	—	—	—	—	—	
Sean Burke	(Canada)	2006—2007	23	6	10	—	5	0	3.12	.901	—	—	—	—	—	—	
Jack Campbell	(United States)	2016—2020	57	20	24	—	5	2	2.51	.918	—	—	—	—	—	—	
Jacques Caron	(Canada)	1967—1969	4	0	2	0	—	0	3.90	—	—	—	—	—	—	—	
Roman Cechmanek	(Czech Republic)	2003—2004	49	18	21	6	—	5	2.51	.906	—	—	—	—	—	—	
Frederic Chabot	(Canada)	1997—1998	12	3	3	2	—	0	3.14	.891	—	—	—	—	—	—	
Mathieu Chouinard	(Canada)	2003—2004	1	0	0	0	—	0	0.00	1.000	—	—	—	—	—	—	
Dan Cloutier	(Canada)	2006—2008	33	8	18	—	3	0	3.83	.868	—	—	—	—	—	—	
Pheonix Copley	(United States)	2022—2026	47	28	8	—	5	2	2.76	.897	1	0	0	0	4.26	.750	
Marcel Cousineau	(Canada)	1999—2001	5	1	1	0	—	0	2.11	.906	—	—	—	—	—	—	
Byron Dafoe	(Canada)	1995—1997	87	27	41	13	—	1	3.53	.896	—	—	—	—	—	—	^{[note 1]}
Denis DeJordy	(Canada)	1969—1972	86	23	45	15	—	1	3.73	—	—	—	—	—	—	—	
Gerry Desjardins	(Canada)	1968—1970	103	25	63	11	—	7	3.52	—	9	3	4	0	3.90	—	
Gary Edwards	(Canada)	1971—1977	155	54	68	22	—	7	3.39	—	3	2	1	0	3.33	—	
Darren Eliot	(Canada)	1984—1985	84	25	41	11	—	1	4.54	.852	1	0	0	0	10.50	.759	
Jhonas Enroth	(Sweden)	2015—2016	16	7	5	—	1	2	2.17	.922	9	3	4	0	3.90	—	
Erik Ersberg	(Sweden)	2007—2010	53	18	19	—	10	2	2.55	.910	1	0	0	0	9.28	.500	
Stephane Fiset	(Canada)	1996—2001	200	80	85	22	—	10	2.85	.906	7	0	5	0	3.48	.893	
Mark Fitzpatrick	(Canada)	1988—1989	17	6	7	3	—	0	4.01	.886	—	—	—	—	—	—	
Anton Forsberg	(Sweden)	2025—2026	36	16	12	—	5	3	2.57	.909	4	0	4	0	2.70	.909	
Grant Fuhr	(Canada)	1994—1995	14	1	7	3	—	0	4.04	.876	—	—	—	—	—	—	HHOF 2003
Yutaka Fukufuji	(Japan)	2006—2007	4	0	3	—	0	0	4.37	.837	—	—	—	—	—	—	^{[note 2]}
Mathieu Garon	(Canada)	2005—2007	95	44	36	—	9	6	3.03	.898	—	—	—	—	—	—	
Mario Gosselin	(Canada)	1989—1990	26	7	11	1	—	0	3.87	.864	3	0	2	0	2.89	.864	
David Goverde	(Canada)	1991—1994	5	1	4	0	—	0	6.25	.808	—	—	—	—	—	—	
Ron Grahame	(Canada)	1978—1981	66	23	32	7	—	2	4.24	—	—	—	—	—	—	—	
Troy Grosenick	(United States)	2020—2021	2	1	1	—	0	0	3.00	.922	—	—	—	—	—	—	
Adam Hauser	(Canada)	2005—2006	1	0	0	—	0	0	7.08	.750	—	—	—	—	—	—	
Glenn Healy	(Canada)	1985—1989	83	37	37	3	—	1	4.33	.872	7	1	4	0	4.66	.860	
Milan Hnilicka	(Czech Republic)	2003—2004	2	0	0	0	—	0	3.76	.881	—	—	—	—	—	—	
Kelly Hrudey	(Canada)	1988—1996	360	145	135	55	—	10	3.47	.896	57	26	30	0	3.53	.883	
Cristobal Huet	(France)	2002—2004	53	14	20	11	—	4	2.41	.908	—	—	—	—	—	—	
Pauli Jaks	(Switzerland)	1994—1995	1	0	0	0	—	0	3.00	.920	—	—	—	—	—	—	
Bob Janecyk	(United States)	1984—1989	102	41	44	12	—	2	4.15	.870	3	0	3	0	3.26	.900	
Al Jensen	(Canada)	1986—1987	5	1	4	0	—	0	5.40	.824	—	—	—	—	—	—	
Doug Keans	(Canada)	1979—1983	56	13	18	13	—	0	4.08	—	3	0	2	0	6.67	—	
Rick Knickle	(Canada)	1992—1994	14	7	6	0	—	0	3.74	.879	—	—	—	—	—	—	
Joonas Korpisalo	(Finland)	2022—2023	11	7	3	—	1	1	2.13	.921	6	2	4	0	3.77	.892	
Darcy Kuemper	(Canada)	2017—2018; 2024—2026	119	60	26	—	25	11	2.35	.911	6	2	4	0	3.74	.889	
Martin Jones	(Canada)	2013—2015	34	16	11	—	2	7	1.99	.923	2	0	0	0	0.00	1.000	SC 2014
Jason LaBarbera	(Canada)	2005—2009	93	33	40	—	8	4	2.93	.904	—	—	—	—	—	—	
Gary Laskoski	(Canada)	1982—1984	59	19	27	5	—	0	4.65	.843	—	—	—	—	—	—	
Manny Legace	(Canada)	1998—1999	17	2	9	2	—	0	2.60	.911	—	—	—	—	—	—	
Mario Lessard	(Canada)	1978—1984	240	92	97	39	—	9	3.74	—	20	6	12	0	4.38	—	
Markus Mattsson	(Finland)	1982—1984	38	12	13	6	—	2	4.32	.854	—	—	—	—	—	—	
Roland Melanson	(Canada)	1985—1989	119	40	58	14	—	3	4.32	.859	6	1	5	0	6.19	.832	
Jack Norris	(Canada)	1970—1971	25	7	11	2	—	0	3.91	—	—	—	—	—	—	—	
Paul Pageau	(Canada)	1980—1981	1	0	1	0	—	0	8.00	—	—	—	—	—	—	—	
Steve Passmore	(Canada)	2000—2001	14	3	8	1	—	1	3.09	.881	—	—	—	—	—	—	
Calvin Petersen	(United States)	2018—2023	101	44	42	—	10	4	2.92	.905	1	0	0	0	7.45	.800	
Erik Portillo	(Sweden)	2024—2025	1	1	0	—	0	0	1.02	.966	—	—	—	—	—	—	
Felix Potvin	(Canada)	2000—2003	136	61	52	16	—	14	2.35	.905	20	10	10	3	2.34	.915	
Jonathan Quick	(United States)	2007—2023	743	370	275	—	82	57	2.46	.911	92	49	43	10	2.31	.921	SC 2012; SC 2014
David Rittich	(Czech Republic)	2023—2025	58	29	20	—	5	3	2.55	.902	2	0	2	0	2.56	.872	
Jim Rutherford	(Canada)	1980—1982	10	6	3	0	—	0	5.68	—	1	0	0	0	6.00	—	
Wayne Rutledge	(Canada)	1967—1970	82	28	37	9	—	2	3.34	—	8	2	4	0	3.17	—	
Terry Sawchuk	(Canada)	1967—1968	36	11	14	6	—	2	3.07	—	5	2	3	1	3.86	—	HHOF 1971
Ron Scott	(Canada)	1989—1990	12	5	6	0	—	0	3.67	.875	1	0	0	0	7.45	.600	
Travis Scott	(Canada)	2000—2001	1	0	0	0	—	0	7.28	.700	—	—	—	—	—	—	
Ben Scrivens	(Canada)	2013—2014	15	7	5	—	4	3	1.97	.931	—	—	—	—	—	—	
Gary Simmons	(Canada)	1976—1978	18	3	9	3	—	0	3.86	1	0	0	0	0	3.00	—	
Billy Smith	(Canada)	1971—1972	5	1	3	1	—	0	4.60	—	—	—	—	—	—	—	HHOF 1993
Garret Sparks	(United States)	2021—2022	2	1	0	—	0	0	1.85	.936	—	—	—	—	—	—	
Robb Stauber	(United States)	1989—1990	56	19	20	9	—	1	3.81	.892	4	3	1	0	4.00	.898	
Jamie Storr	(Canada)	1994—2003	205	85	78	21	—	16	2.52	.910	5	0	3	0	3.65	.892	
Cam Talbot	(Canada)	2023—2024	54	27	20	—	6	3	2.50	.913	3	1	2	0	5.30	.861	
Danny Taylor	(Canada)	2007—2008	1	0	0	—	0	0	6.00	.800	—	—	—	—	—	—	
Rogatien Vachon	(Canada)	1971—1978	389	171	148	66	—	32	2.86	—	25	9	16	1	3.09	—	Ret # 30; HHOF 2016
Steve Weeks	(Canada)	1991—1992	7	1	3	0	—	0	4.04	.875	—	—	—	—	—	—	
Jeff Zatkoff	(United States)	2016—2017	13	2	7	—	1	0	2.95	.879	—	—	—	—	—	—	

== Skaters ==
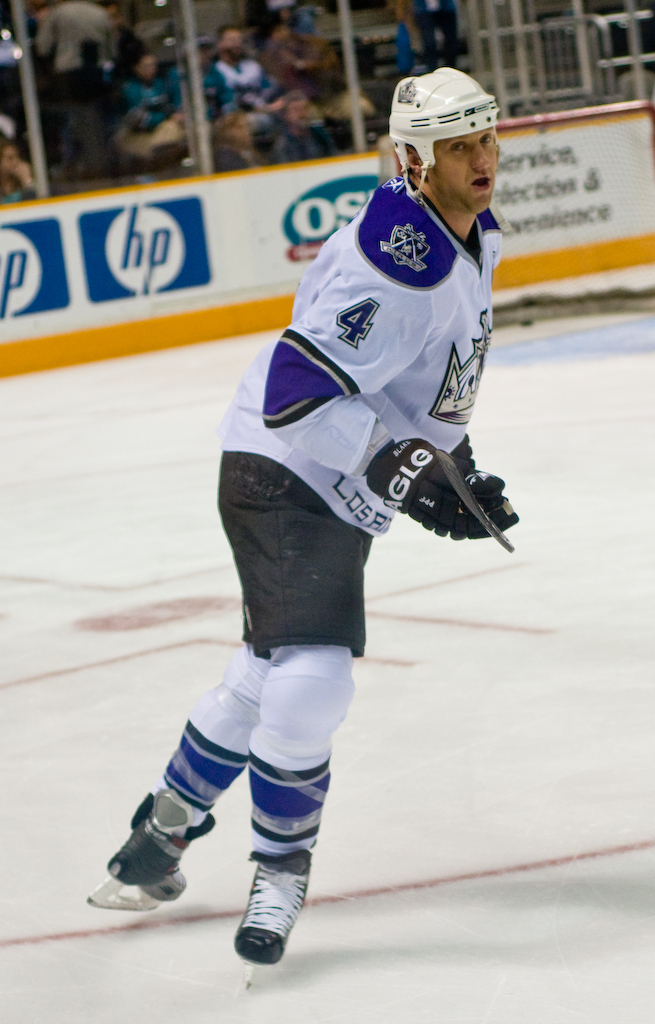
Rob Blake was captain of the Kings twice during his career.

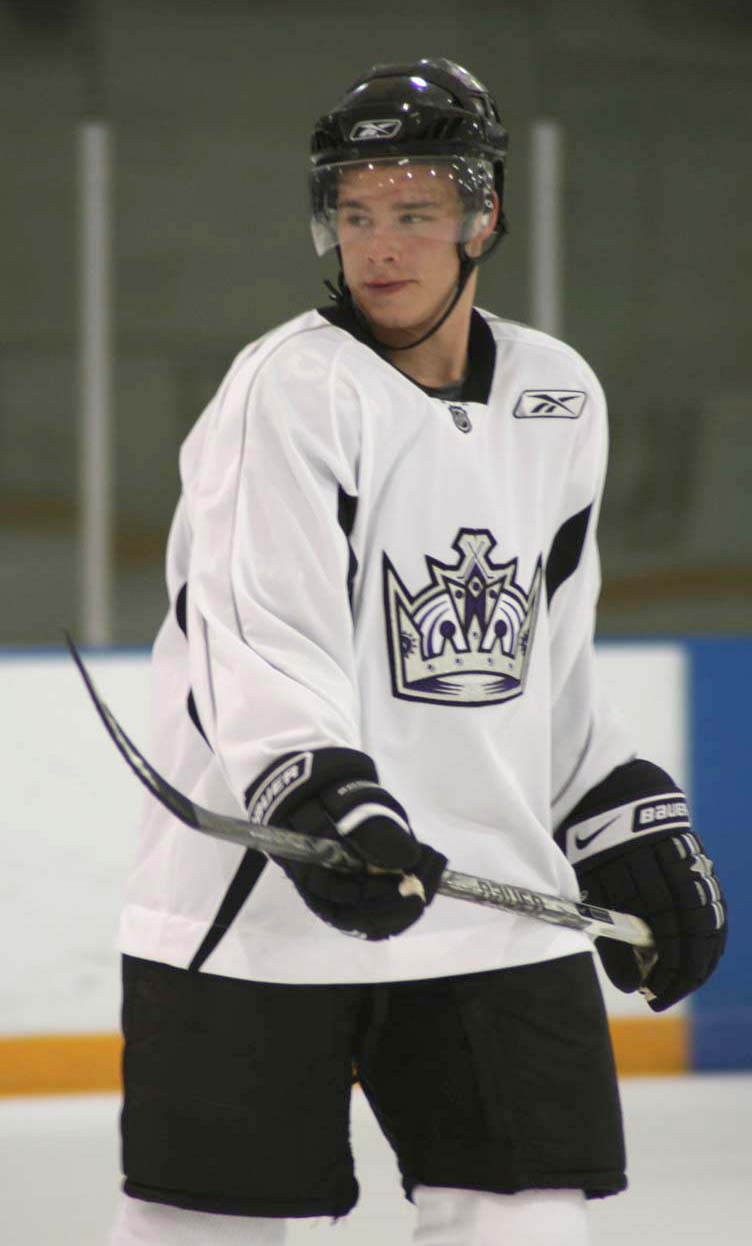
Dustin Brown, shown here at practice, is the past captain of the Kings.

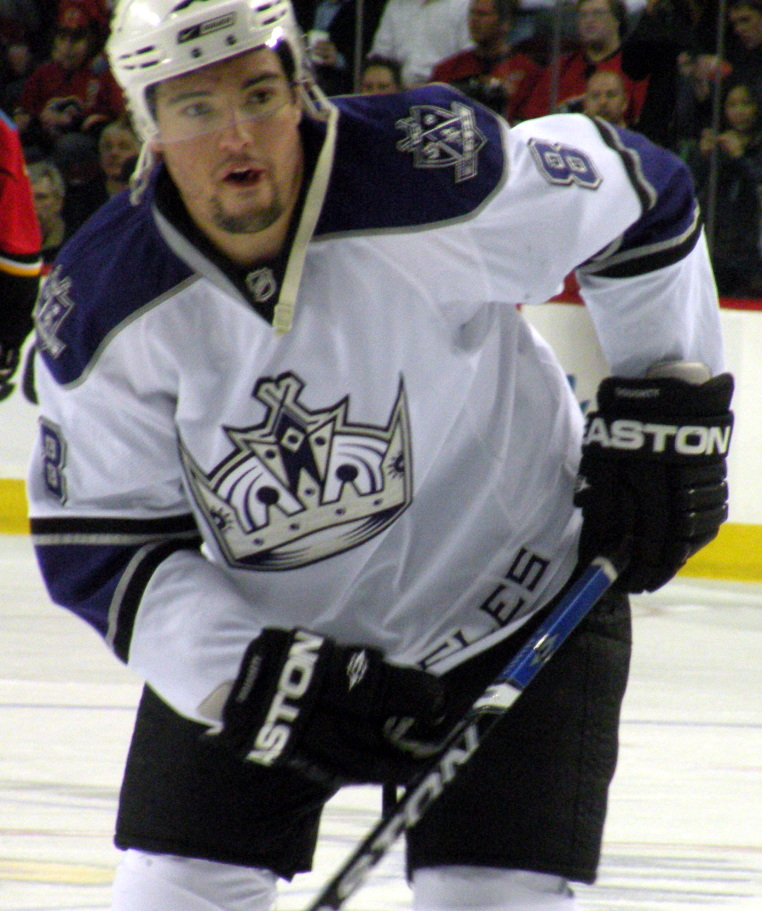
Drew Doughty was a Norris Trophy nominee following the 2009–2010 season.

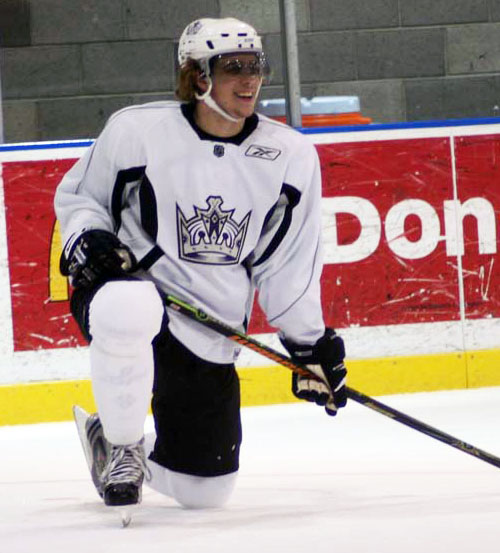
Anze Kopitar, shown here at practice, led the Kings in scoring in 2009–10.

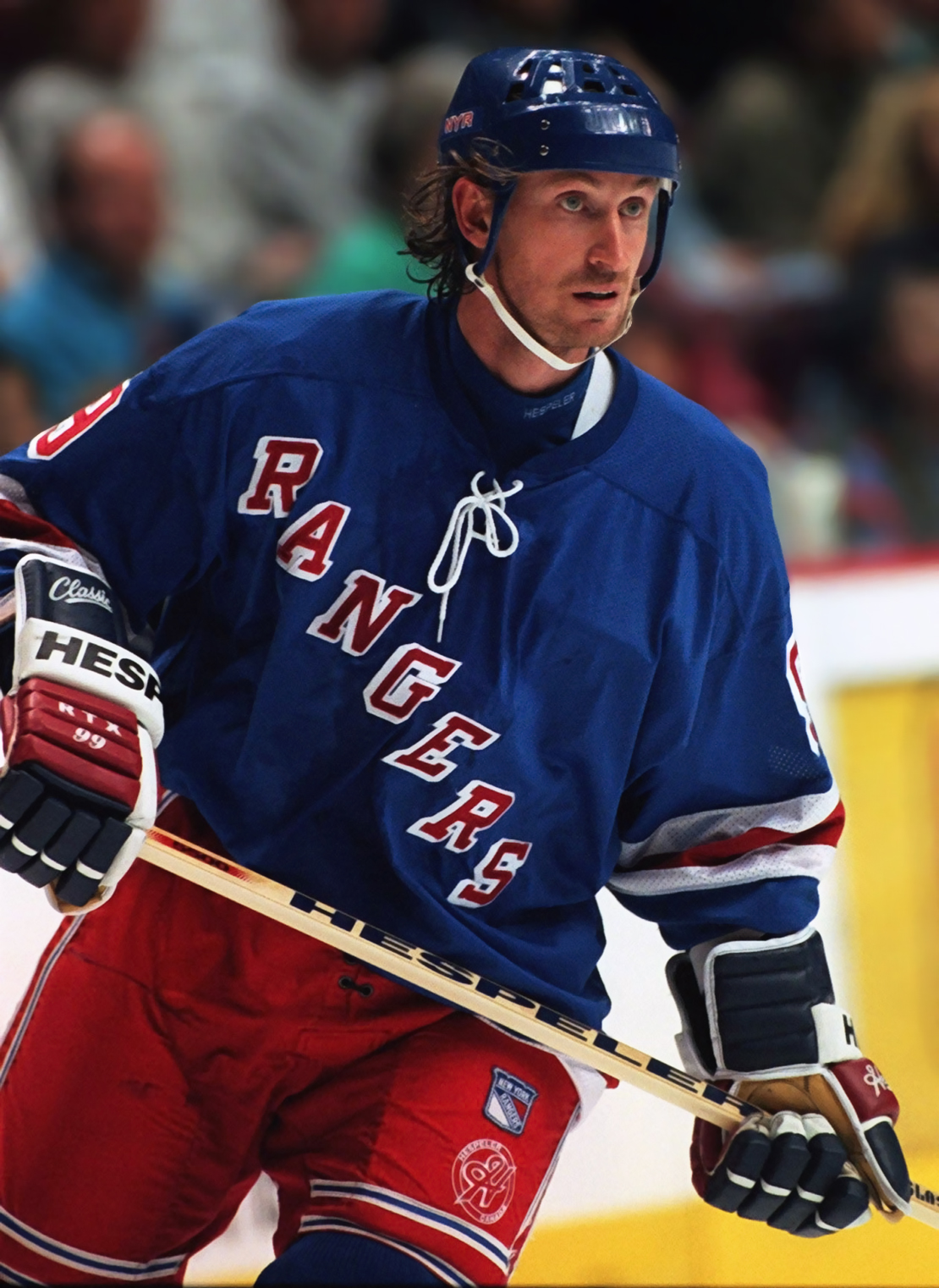
Wayne Gretzky, shown here in a New York Rangers uniform, led the Kings to the 1993 Stanley Cup Final.

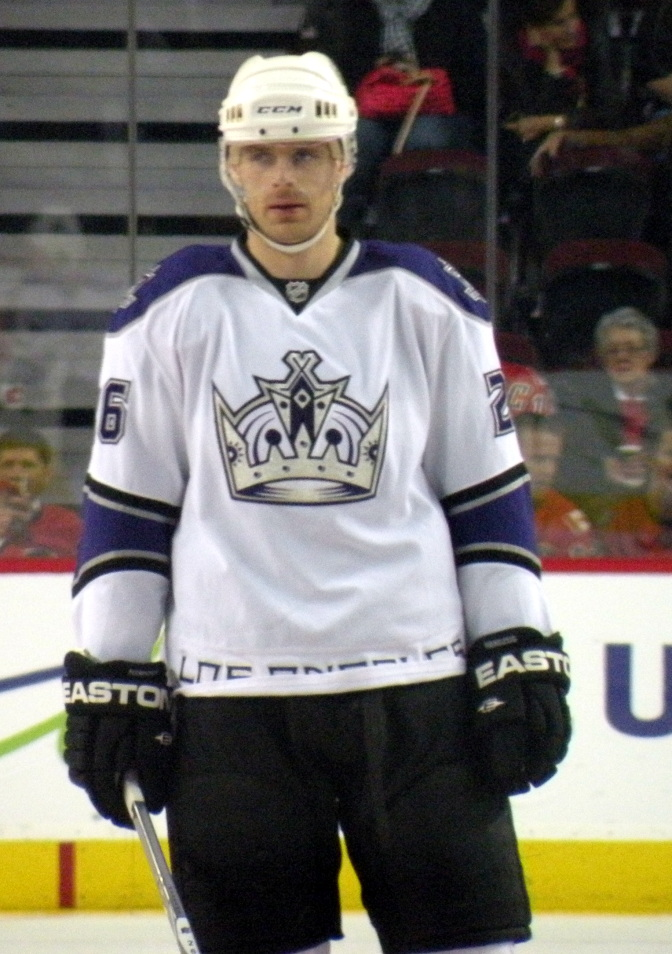
Michal Handzus signed as a free agent with the Kings in 2007.

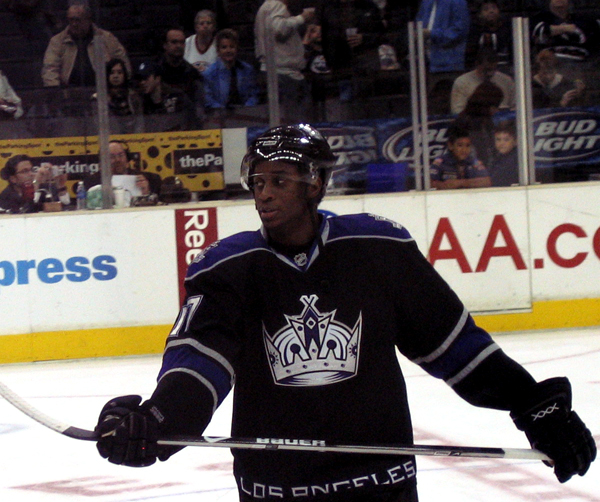
Wayne Simmonds was a second round pick for the kings in 2007.

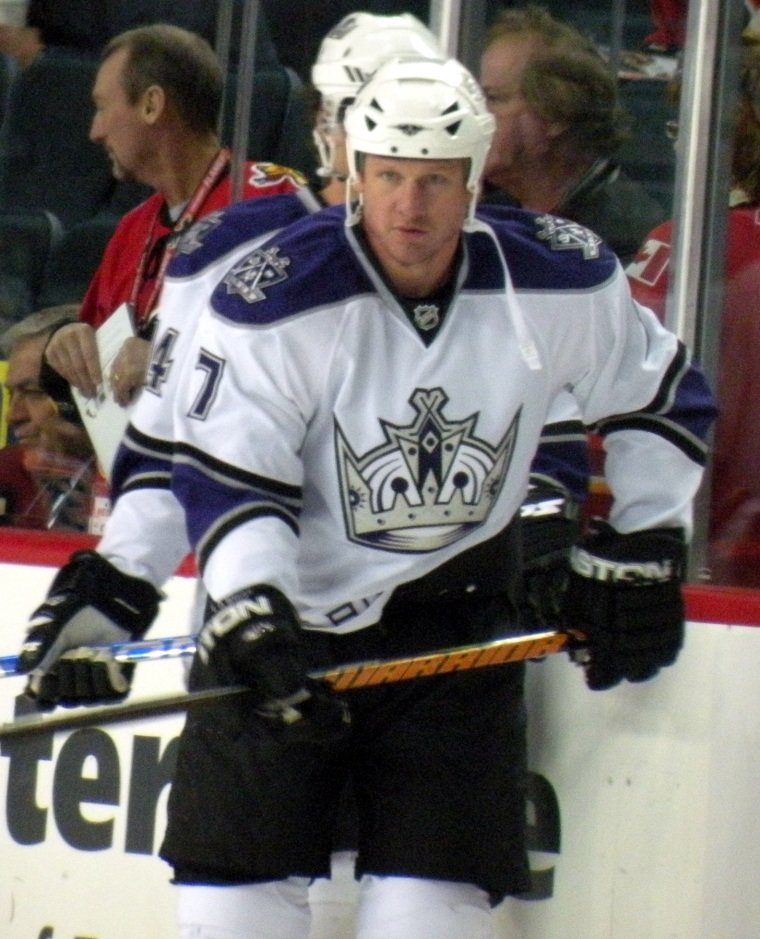
Derek Armstrong played six seasons with the Kings.

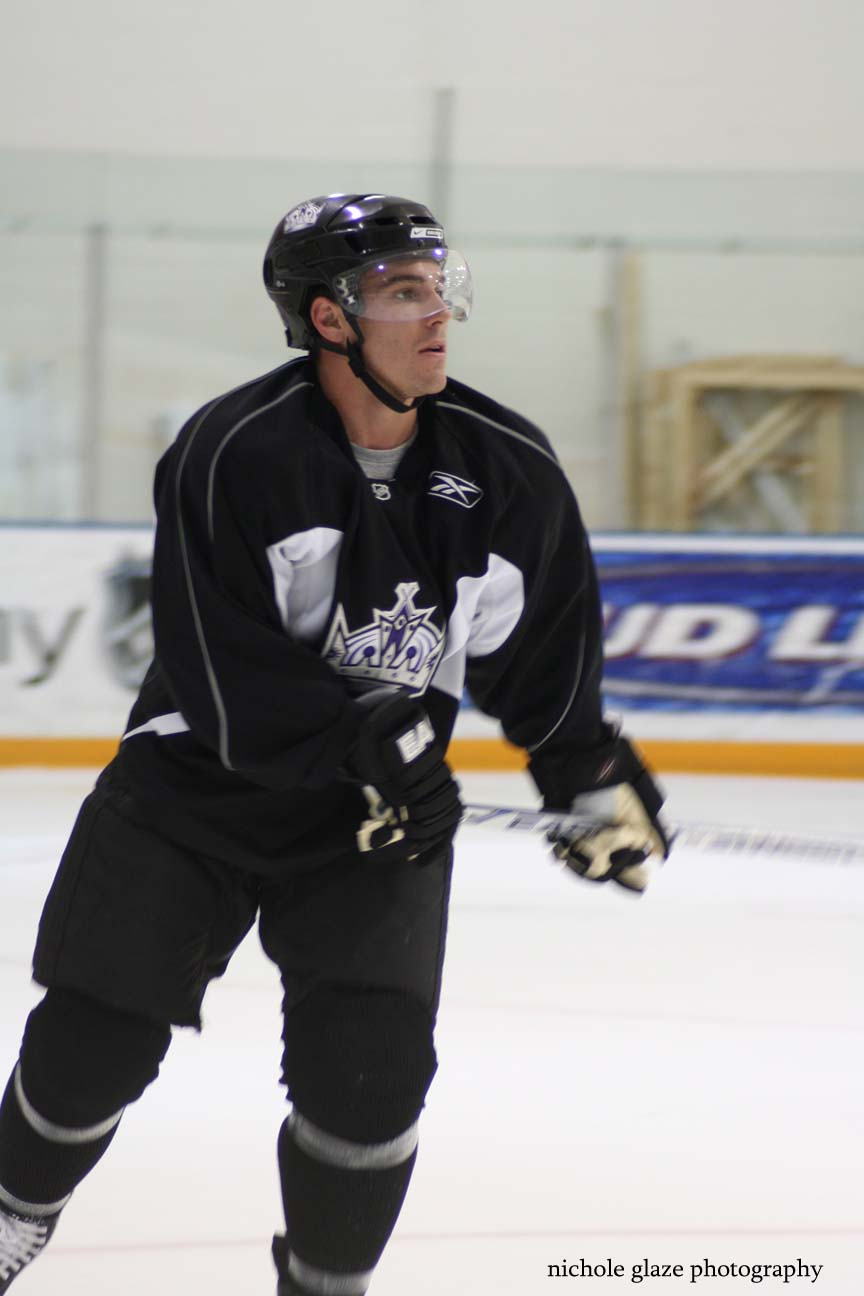
Michael Cammalleri began his career with the Kings.

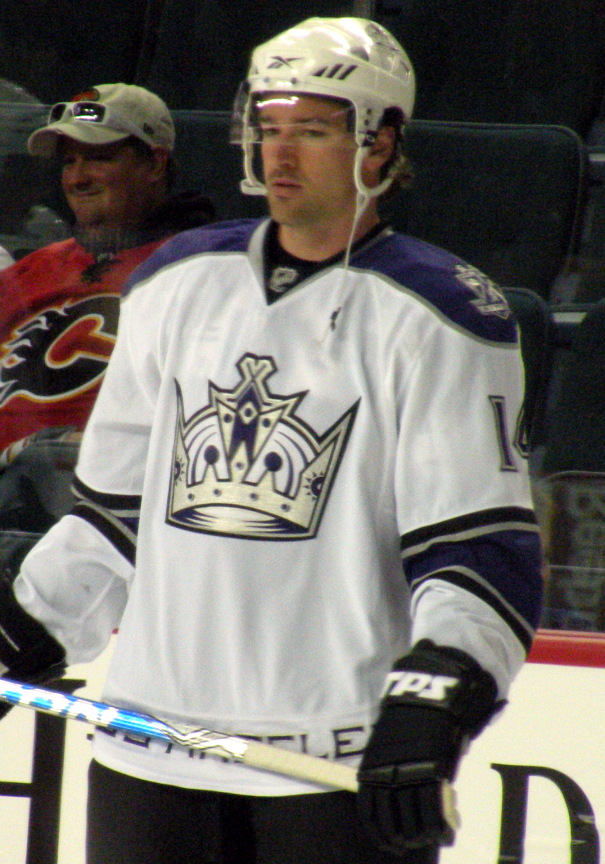
Justin Williams was traded to the Kings in 2009.

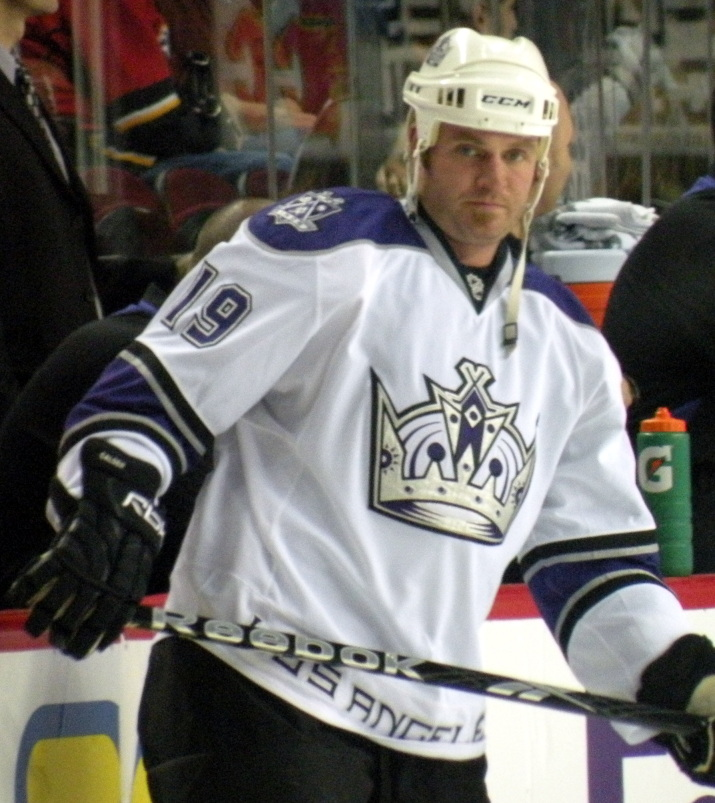
Kyle Calder played two seasons with the Kings.

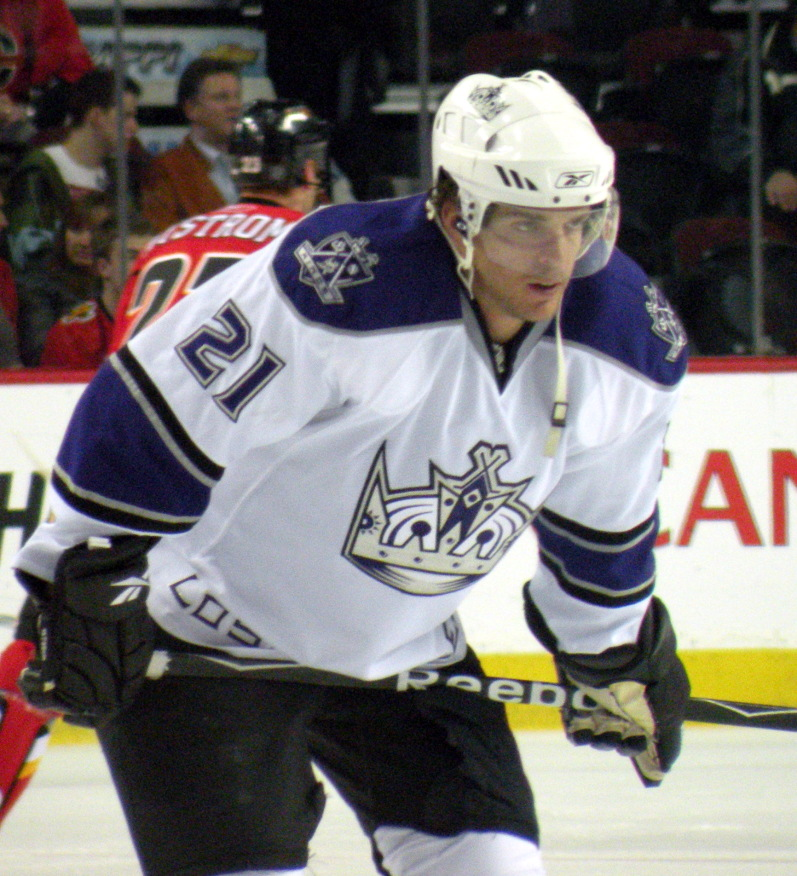
Denis Gauthier played in 65 games for the Kings during the 2008–2009 season.

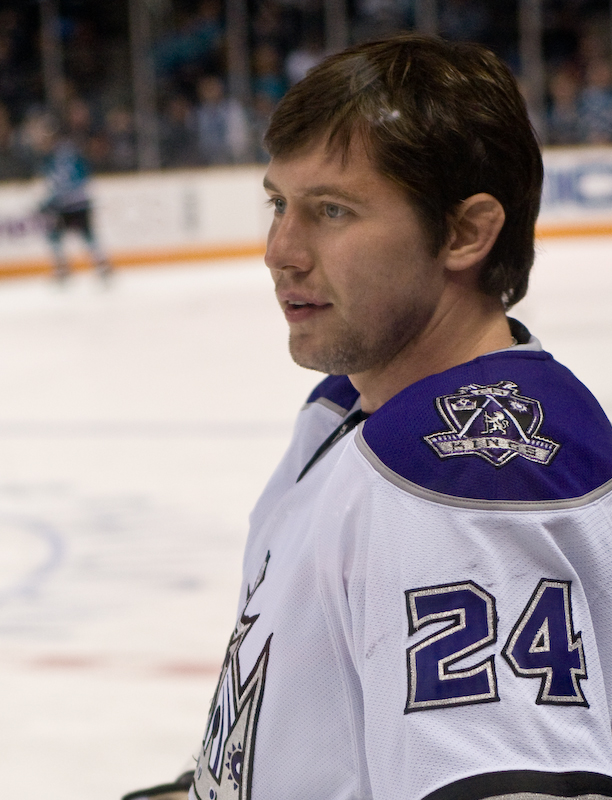
Alexander Frolov was the Kings' first round pick in 2000.

Name	Nat	Pos	Seasons	GP	G	A	P	PIM	GP	G	A	P	PIM	Notes
Name	Nat	Pos	Seasons	Regular season					Playoffs					Notes
Dennis Abgrall	(Canada)	RW	1975—1976	13	0	2	2	4	—	—	—	—	—	
Peter Ahola	(Finland)	RW	1991—1993	79	8	13	21	107	6	0	0	0	2	
Jason Allison	(Canada)	C	2001—2004	99	25	77	102	90	7	3	3	6	4	
Mike Allison	(Canada)	RW	1987—1990	147	32	45	77	257	16	2	0	2	28	
Mark Alt	(United States)	C	2020—2021	2	0	0	0	2	—	—	—	—	—	
Dave Amadio	(Canada)	D	1967—1969	123	5	11	16	161	16	1	2	3	18	
Michael Amadio	(Canada)	C	2017—2021	168	16	23	39	26	1	0	1	1	0	
Jim Anderson	(Canada)	LW	1967—1968	7	1	2	3	2	—	—	—	—	—	
Mikey Anderson	(United States)	D	2019—2026	425	21	81	102	146	28	1	5	6	12	
Ron Anderson	(Canada)	RW	1968—1969	56	3	5	8	26	4	0	0	0	2	
Russ Anderson	(United States)	D	1983—1985	84	6	13	19	146	—	—	—	—	—	
Jaret Anderson-Dolan	(Canada)	C	2018—2024	126	15	13	28	18	4	0	0	0	0	
Lias Andersson	(Sweden)	C	2020—2023	44	4	4	8	24	—	—	—	—	—	
Andy Andreoff	(Canada)	LW	2014—2018	159	13	11	24	214	1	0	0	0	0	
Syl Apps, Jr	(Canada)	C	1977—1980	201	31	72	103	59	4	1	1	2	0	
Joel Armia	(Finland)	RW	2025—2026	61	13	12	25	30	3	0	0	0	6	
Derek Armstrong	(Canada)	C	2002—2009	385	63	139	202	297	—	—	—	—	—	
Viktor Arvidsson	(Sweden)	LW	2021—2024	161	52	71	123	60	11	1	9	10	2	
Andreas Athanasiou	(Canada)	C	2020—2022	75	21	19	40	31	6	1	0	1	4	
Donald Audette	(Canada)	RW	1998—2000	98	30	38	68	96	—	—	—	—	—	
Justin Auger	(Canada)	RW	2017—2018	2	0	0	0	0	—	—	—	—	—	
Jared Aulin	(Canada)	C	2002—2003	17	2	2	4	0	—	—	—	—	—	
Sean Avery	(Canada)	LW	2002—2007	218	35	64	99	667	—	—	—	—	—	
Dave Babych	(Canada)	D	1998—1999	8	0	2	2	2	—	—	—	—	—	
Ralph Backstrom	(Canada)	C	1970—1973	172	57	71	128	36	—	—	—	—	—	
Blair Barnes	(Canada)	RW	1982—1983	1	0	0	0	0	—	—	—	—	—	
Scott Barney	(Canada)	C	2002—2004	24	5	6	11	4	—	—	—	—	—	
Fred Barrett	(Canada)	D	1983—1984	15	2	0	2	8	—	—	—	—	—	
Doug Barrie	(Canada)	D	1971—1972	48	3	13	16	47	—	—	—	—	—	
Len Barrie	(Canada)	C	1999—2000	46	5	8	13	56	—	—	—	—	—	
Ruslan Batyrshin	(Russia)	D	1995—1996	2	0	0	0	6	—	—	—	—	—	
Ken Baumgartner	(Canada)	LW	1987—1990	91	4	6	10	503	10	0	1	1	36	
Barry Beck	(Canada)	D	1989—1990	52	1	7	8	53	—	—	—	—	—	
Jaroslav Bednar	(Czech Republic)	C	2001—2003	37	4	11	15	12	3	0	0	0	0	
Derek Bekar	(Canada)	C	2002—2003	6	0	0	0	4	—	—	—	—	—	
Eric Belanger	(Canada)	C	2001—2006	323	63	87	150	169	20	1	4	5	6	
Ken Belanger	(Canada)	LW	2001—2006	52	2	0	2	109	—	—	—	—	—	
Brian Benning	(Canada)	D	1989—1992	162	14	72	86	330	19	0	7	7	12	
Aki Berg	(Finland)	D	1995—2001	281	5	38	43	202	6	0	3	3	2	
Serge Bernier	(Canada)	RW	1971—1973	101	33	57	90	55	—	—	—	—	—	
Bob Berry	(Canada)	LW	1970—1977	539	159	191	350	344	26	2	6	8	6	
Nick Beverley	(Canada)	D	1978—1979	7	0	3	3	0	—	—	—	—	—	
Tobias Bjornfot	(Sweden)	D	2019—2024	117	1	14	15	26	—	—	—	—	—	
Scott Bjugstad	(United States)	LW	1989—1992	64	5	10	15	24	4	0	0	0	2	
Jason Blake	(United States)	LW	1989—2001	82	7	21	28	36	3	0	0	0	0	
Rob Blake	(Canada)	D	1989—2001; 2006—2008	805	161	333	494	1,231	57	8	16	24	98	HHOF 2014; Ret #4
Rick Blight	(Canada)	RW	1982—1983	2	0	0	0	2	—	—	—	—	—	
Arto Blomsten	(Sweden)	D	1994—1996	6	0	2	2	0	—	—	—	—	—	
Doug Bodger	(Canada)	D	1998—1999	65	3	11	14	34	—	—	—	—	—	
Dan Bonar	(Canada)	C	1980—1983	170	25	39	64	208	14	3	4	7	22	
Angus Booth	(Canada)	D	2025—2026	1	1	0	1	0	—	—	—	—	—	
Philippe Boucher	(Canada)	D	1994—2002	312	32	77	109	255	18	0	2	2	4	
Bob Bourne	(Canada)	C	1986—1988	150	20	20	40	63	10	2	2	4	0	
Brian Boyle	(United States)	C	2007—2009	36	8	2	10	46	—	—	—	—	—	
Steve Bozek	(Canada)	LW	1981—1983	124	46	36	82	82	10	4	1	5	6	
Frank Breault	(Canada)	RW	1990—1993	27	2	4	6	42	—	—	—	—	—	
Dan Brennan	(Canada)	LW	1983—1986	8	0	1	1	9	—	—	—	—	—	
Kip Brennan	(Canada)	LW	2001—2004	41	1	0	1	158	—	—	—	—	—	
Rich Brennan	(United States)	D	2000—2001	2	0	0	0	0	—	—	—	—	—	
Daniel Brickley	(United States)	D	2017—2019	5	0	2	2	0	—	—	—	—	—	
Jonny Brodzinski	(United States)	C	2016—2019	54	6	5	11	10	—	—	—	—	—	
Neal Broten	(United States)	C	1996—1997	19	0	4	4	0	—	—	—	—	—	
Dustin Brown	(United States)	RW	2003—2022	1,296	325	387	712	738	92	19	30	49	84	SC 2012, 2014
Jim Brown	(United States)	D	1982—1983	3	0	1	1	5	—	—	—	—	—	
Kevin Brown	(United Kingdom)	RW	1994—1996	30	3	3	6	22	—	—	—	—	—	^{[note 3]}
Larry Brown	(Canada)	D	1972—1978	364	5	45	50	152	24	0	3	3	10	
Rob Brown	(Canada)	RW	1994—1995	2	0	0	0	0	—	—	—	—	—	
Kelly Buchberger	(Canada)	RW	1999—2002	169	14	22	36	193	19	1	0	1	13	
Randy Burridge	(Canada)	LW	1994—1995	38	4	15	19	8	—	—	—	—	—	
Kyle Burroughs	(Canada)	D	2024—2025	33	0	3	3	39	—	—	—	—	—	
Rod Buskas	(Canada)	D	1990—1992	62	3	8	11	193	2	0	2	2	22	
Mike Byers	(Canada)	RW	1970—1972	100	31	23	54	25	—	—	—	—	—	
Quinton Byfield	(Canada)	C	2020—2026	339	75	116	191	186	23	4	10	14	18	
Dan Bylsma	(United States)	LW	1995—2000	220	9	21	30	122	5	0	0	0	0	
Larry Cahan	(Canada)	D	1968—1971	209	10	30	40	172	11	1	1	2	22	
Kyle Calder	(Canada)	LW	2007—2009	139	15	32	47	59	—	—	—	—	—	
Michael Cammalleri	(Canada)	LW	2002—2008; 2017—2018	298	96	116	212	174	—	—	—	—	—	
Andrew Campbell	(Canada)	D	2013—2014	3	0	0	0	0	—	—	—	—	—	
Bryan Campbell	(Canada)	C	1967—1970	93	12	20	32	24	6	2	1	3	0	
Daniel Carcillo	(Canada)	LW	2013-2014	26	1	1	2	57	—	—	—	—	—	
Brian Carlin	(Canada)	LW	1971—1972	5	1	0	1	0	—	—	—	—	—	
Steve Carlson	(United States)	C	1979—1980	52	9	12	21	23	4	1	1	2	7	
Bobby Carpenter	(United States)	C	1986—1989	120	32	51	83	106	10	2	3	5	2	
Gene Carr	(Canada)	C	1973—1978	212	38	66	104	184	17	4	4	8	45	
Larry Carriere	(Canada)	D	1977—1978	2	0	0	0	0	—	—	—	—	—	
Jimmy Carson	(United States)	C	1986—1994	219	108	111	219	83	28	11	9	20	12	
Anson Carter	(Canada)	RW	2003—2004	15	0	1	1	0	—	—	—	—	—	
Jeff Carter	(Canada)	C	2011—2021	580	194	189	383	253	73	26	27	53	28	SC 2012, 2014
Cody Ceci	(Canada)	D	2025—2026	82	1	8	9	16	4	0	0	0	0	
Rene Chapdelaine	(Canada)	D	1990—1993	32	0	2	2	32	—	—	—	—	—	
Brad Chartrand	(Canada)	RW	1999—2004	215	25	25	50	122	11	1	1	2	8	
Rick Chartraw	(Venezuela)	D	1980—1983	85	6	19	25	115	14	0	3	3	21	^{[note 4]}
Marc Chorney	(Canada)	D	1983—1984	71	3	9	12	58	—	—	—	—	—	
Steve Christoff	(United States)	C	1983—1984	58	8	7	15	13	—	—	—	—	—	
Shane Churla	(Canada)	RW	1995—1996	11	1	2	3	37	—	—	—	—	—	
Jeff Chychrun	(Canada)	D	1991—1993	43	0	4	4	99	—	—	—	—	—	
Kale Clague	(Canada)	D	2019—2022	33	0	11	11	8	—	—	—	—	—	
Brandt Clarke	(Canada)	D	2022—2026	185	15	66	81	125	10	2	1	3	0	
Noah Clarke	(United States)	LW	2003—2007	20	2	1	3	4	—	—	—	—	—	
Marc-Andre Cliche	(Canada)	C	2009—2010	1	0	0	0	0	—	—	—	—	—	
Kyle Clifford	(Canada)	LW	2010–2020	660	60	69	129	819	51	4	10	14	62	SC 2012, 2014
Steve Clippingdale	(Canada)	LW	1976—1977	16	1	2	3	9	1	0	0	0	0	
Richard Clune	(Canada)	LW	2009—2010	14	0	2	2	26	4	0	0	0	5	
Paul Coffey	(Canada)	D	1991—1993	60	9	53	62	75	6	4	3	7	2	HHOF 2004
Pat Conacher	(Canada)	LW	1992—1996	241	36	32	68	121	24	6	4	10	6	
Kenny Connors	(United States)	C	2025—2026	2	0	0	0	0	—	—	—	—	—	
Craig Conroy	(United States)	C	2005—2007	130	27	55	82	116	—	—	—	—	—	
Brandon Convery	(Canada)	C	1998—1999	3	0	0	0	4	—	—	—	—	—	
Mike Corbett	(Canada)	RW	1967—1968	—	—	—	—	—	2	0	1	1	2	
Bob Corkum	(United States)	C	1999—2001	103	9	12	21	32	4	0	0	0	0	
Mike Corrigan	(Canada)	LW	1967—1976	401	106	124	230	524	15	2	3	5	20	
Joe Corvo	(United States)	D	2002—2006	203	27	50	77	88	—	—	—	—	—	
Russ Courtnall	(Canada)	RW	1997—1999	115	18	19	37	46	4	0	0	0	2	
Sylvain Couturier	(Canada)	C	1988—1992	33	4	5	9	4	—	—	—	—	—	
Jeff Cowan	(Canada)	LW	2003—2007	80	10	4	14	129	—	—	—	—	—	
Rob Cowie	(Canada)	D	1994—1996	78	7	12	19	52	—	—	—	—	—	
Bart Crashley	(Canada)	D	1975—1976	4	0	1	1	6	—	—	—	—	—	
Andrew Crescenzi	(Canada)	C	2017—2018	2	0	0	0	2	—	—	—	—	—	
Doug Crossman	(Canada)	D	1988—1989	74	10	15	25	53	2	0	1	1	2	
Gary Croteau	(Canada)	RW	1968—1970	14	5	1	6	6	11	3	2	5	8	
Keith Crowder	(Canada)	RW	1989—1990	55	4	13	17	93	7	1	0	1	9	
Troy Crowder	(Canada)	RW	1994—1996	44	2	2	4	141	—	—	—	—	—	
Phil Crowe	(Canada)	RW	1993—1994	31	0	2	2	77	—	—	—	—	—	
Dan Currie	(Canada)	LW	1993—1994	5	1	1	2	0	—	—	—	—	—	
Glen Currie	(Canada)	C	1985—1988	19	1	2	3	9	—	—	—	—	—	
Paul Curtis	(Canada)	D	1970—1973	155	2	30	32	155	—	—	—	—	—	
Kevin Dallman	(Kazakhstan)	D	2006—2008	87	4	13	17	16	—	—	—	—	—	
Phillip Danault	(Canada)	C	2021—2026	349	70	130	200	151	24	7	12	19	18	
Adam Deadmarsh	(United States)	RW	2000—2003	114	46	39	85	96	17	4	6	10	6	^{[note 5]}
Dale DeGray	(Canada)	D	1988—1989	63	6	22	28	97	8	1	2	3	12	
Ab DeMarco	(Canada)	D	1975—1977	63	7	6	13	12	10	0	0	0	13	
Pavol Demitra	(Slovakia)	RW	2005—2006	58	25	37	62	42	—	—	—	—	—	
Nathan Dempsey	(Canada)	D	2003—2004; 2005—2006	70	6	14	20	50	—	—	—	—	—	
Peter Dineen	(Canada)	D	1986—1987	11	0	2	2	8	—	—	—	—	—	
Marcel Dionne	(Canada)	C	1975—1987	921	550	757	1,307	461	43	20	23	43	15	HHOF 1992; Ret # 16
Paul DiPietro	(Canada)	C	1996—1997	6	1	0	1	6	—	—	—	—	—	
Ted Donato	(United States)	LW	2001—2002	2	0	0	0	2	—	—	—	—	—	
Mike Donnelly	(United States)	LW	1990—1995	307	87	83	170	144	42	12	11	23	24	
Drew Doughty	(Canada)	D	2008—2026	1,279	165	544	709	829	105	19	42	61	90	SC 2012, 2014
Nic Dowd	(United States)	C	2015—2018	91	6	17	23	39	—	—	—	—	—	
Davis Drewiske	(United States)	D	2008—2013	126	4	18	22	67	—	—	—	—	—	SC 2012
John Druce	(Canada)	RW	1993—1996	162	38	34	72	84	—	—	—	—	—	
Pierre-Luc Dubois	(Canada)	LW	2024—2025	82	16	24	40	70	5	1	0	1	20	
Steve Duchesne	(Canada)	D	1986—1991; 1998—1999	442	99	216	315	399	43	13	26	39	44	
Dick Duff	(Canada)	LW	1969—1971	39	6	8	14	8	—	—	—	—	—	HHOF 2006
Marc Dufour	(Canada)	RW	1968—1969	2	0	0	0	0	—	—	—	—	—	
Donald Dufresne	(Canada)	D	1993—1994	9	0	0	0	10	—	—	—	—	—	
Ron Duguay	(Canada)	C	1987—1989	85	9	23	32	65	13	0	0	0	6	
Brian Dumoulin	(United States)	D	2025—2026	82	2	15	17	22	4	0	0	0	2	
Craig Duncanson	(Canada)	RW	1985—1990	28	3	3	6	45	—	—	—	—	—	
Sean Durzi	(Canada)	D	2021—2023	136	12	53	65	105	13	2	2	4	8	
Darryl Edestrand	(Canada)	D	1977—1979	68	1	6	7	61	4	1	1	2	10	
Alexander Edler	(Sweden)	D	2021—2023	105	5	25	30	68	11	0	2	2	18	
Joel Edmundson	(Canada)	D	2024—2026	155	8	35	43	47	10	1	1	2	2	
Christian Ehrhoff	(Germany)	D	2015—2016	40	2	8	10	32	—	—	—	—	—	
Todd Elik	(Canada)	LW	1989—1991	122	31	60	91	99	22	5	16	21	16	
Corey Elkins	(United States)	C	2009—2010	3	1	0	1	0	—	—	—	—	—	
Keaton Ellerby	(Canada)	D	2012—2013	35	0	3	3	16	5	0	0	0	0	
Matt Ellis	(Canada)	LW	2007—2008	19	1	1	2	14	—	—	—	—	—	
Mikko Eloranta	(Finland)	LW	2001—2003	146	14	21	35	110	7	1	1	2	2	
Nelson Emerson	(Canada)	RW	1999—2002	124	17	14	31	79	19	2	3	5	6	
Brian Engblom	(Canada)	D	1983—1986	202	9	59	68	190	3	0	0	0	2	
Andreas Englund	(Sweden)	D	2024—2025	93	2	9	11	93	5	0	1	1	9	
John English	(Canada)	D	1987—1988	3	1	3	4	4	1	0	0	0	0	
Bryan Erickson	(United States)	C	1985—1988	165	46	68	114	82	3	1	1	2	0	
Daryl Evans	(Canada)	RW	1981—1985	105	21	29	50	25	10	5	8	13	12	
Samuel Fagemo	(Sweden)	LW	2021—2025	17	2	1	3	0	—	—	—	—	—	
Oscar Fantenberg	(Sweden)	D	2018—2019	73	4	8	12	21	4	0	1	1	2	
Paul Fenton	(United States)	LW	1987—1989	92	22	26	48	52	5	2	1	3	2	
Ray Ferraro	(Canada)	C	1995—1999	197	48	50	98	223	3	0	1	1	2	
Kevin Fiala	(Switzerland)	LW	2022—2026	288	105	140	245	186	14	5	10	15	10	
Steven Finn	(Canada)	D	1995—1997	104	5	5	10	186	—	—	—	—	—	
Bill Flett	(Canada)	RW	1967—1972	323	84	99	183	295	17	4	6	10	19	
Ryan Flinn	(Canada)	LW	2001—2003; 2005—2006	31	1	0	1	84	—	—	—	—	—	
Warren Foegele	(Canada)	LW	2024—2026	129	31	24	55	38	6	1	2	3	0	
Gerry Foley	(United States)	RW	1968—1969	1	0	0	0	0	—	—	—	—	—	
Christian Folin	(Sweden)	D	2017—2018	65	3	10	13	30	4	0	0	0	0	
Derek Forbort	(United States)	D	2015—2020	268	6	47	53	176	—	—	—	—	—	
Marc Fortier	(Canada)	C	1992—1993	6	0	0	0	5	—	—	—	—	—	
Jim Fox	(Canada)	RW	1980—1990	578	186	293	479	143	22	4	8	12	0	
Colin Fraser	(Canada)	C	2011—2014	134	4	13	17	96	34	1	3	4	14	SC 2012
Matt Frattin	(Canada)	RW	2013—2014	40	2	4	6	11	—	—	—	—	—	
Martin Frk	(Czech Republic)	RW	2019—2022	24	8	2	10	6	—	—	—	—	—	
Alexander Frolov	(Russia)	LW	2005—2010	536	168	213	381	210	6	1	3	4	0	
Marian Gaborik	(Slovakia)	RW	2013—2018	228	61	59	120	76	30	14	9	23	8	SC 2014
Simon Gagne	(Canada)	LW	2011—2012	34	7	10	17	18	4	0	0	0	2	SC 2012
Garry Galley	(Canada)	D	1984—1987; 1997—2000	361	44	115	159	330	11	1	1	2	4	
Dave Gans	(Canada)	C	1982—1983; 1985—1986	6	0	0	0	2	—	—	—	—	—	
Scott Garland	(Canada)	C	1978—1979	6	0	1	1	24	—	—	—	—	—	
Denis Gauthier	(Canada)	D	2008—2009	65	2	2	4	90	—	—	—	—	—	
Gabe Gauthier	(United States)	LW	2006—2008	8	0	0	0	2	—	—	—	—	—	
Vladislav Gavrikov	(Russia)	D	2022—2025	179	14	48	62	64	17	0	5	5	4	
Eric Germain	(Canada)	D	1987—1988	4	0	1	1	13	1	0	0	0	4	
Barry Gibbs	(Canada)	D	1979—1980	63	2	9	11	32	1	0	0	0	0	
John Gibson	(Canada)	C	1980—1982	10	0	0	39	32	—	—	—	—	—	
Tom Gilbert	(United States)	D	2016—2017	18	1	4	5	6	—	—	—	—	—	
Randy Gilhen	(Germany)	C	1991—1992	33	3	6	9	14	—	—	—	—	—	^{[note 6]}
Pierre Giroux	(Canada)	C	1982—1983	6	1	0	1	17	—	—	—	—	—	
Jeff Giuliano	(United States)	LW	2005—2008	101	3	10	13	40	—	—	—	—	—	
Bob Gladney	(Canada)	D	1982—1983	1	0	0	0	2	—	—	—	—	—	
Tim Gleason	(United States)	D	2003—2006	125	2	26	28	98	—	—	—	—	—	
Brian Glennie	(Canada)	D	1978—1979	18	2	2	4	22	—	—	—	—	—	
Glenn Goldup	(Canada)	RW	1976—1982	273	52	66	118	299	16	4	3	7	22	
Butch Goring	(Canada)	C	1969—1980	736	275	384	659	66	30	9	9	18	6	
Tony Granato	(United States)	RW	1989—1996	380	148	157	305	821	52	13	24	37	100	
Danny Grant	(Canada)	LW	1977—1979	76	20	30	50	10	2	0	2	2	2	
Dan Gratton	(Canada)	C	1987—1988	7	1	0	1	5	—	—	—	—	—	
Kevin Gravel	(United States)	D	2015—2018	70	1	9	10	8	—	—	—	—	—	
Terry Gray	(Canada)	RW	1967—1968	65	12	16	28	22	7	0	2	2	10	
Denis Grebeshkov	(Russia)	D	2003—2006	12	0	3	3	12	—	—	—	—	—	
Josh Green	(Canada)	C	1998—1999	27	1	3	4	8	—	—	—	—	—	
Matt Greene	(United States)	D	2008—2017	464	16	51	67	458	61	2	11	13	48	SC 2012, 2014
Lucien Grenier	(Canada)	RW	1970—1972	128	12	11	23	16	—	—	—	—	—	
Wayne Gretzky	(Canada)	C	1988—1996	539	246	672	918	182	60	29	65	94	8	HHOF 1999; Ret # 99
Brent Grieve	(Canada)	LW	1996—1997	18	4	2	6	15	—	—	—	—	—	
Stu Grimson	(Canada)	LW	2000—2001	72	3	2	5	235	5	0	0	0	4	
Scott Gruhl	(Canada)	LW	1981—1983	14	2	3	5	6	—	—	—	—	—	
Carl Grundstrom	(Sweden)	RW	2018—2024	236	40	27	67	84	17	3	2	5	4	
Paul Guay	(United States)	RW	1985—1989	93	9	12	21	76	6	0	1	1	8	
Len Hachborn	(Canada)	C	1985—1986	24	4	1	5	2	—	—	—	—	—	
Carl Hagelin	(Sweden)	LW	2018—2019	22	1	4	5	8	—	—	—	—	—	
Anders Hakansson	(Sweden)	LW	1983—1986	191	31	30	61	77	3	0	0	0	0	
Bob Halkidis	(Canada)	D	1989—1991	54	1	7	8	189	11	0	1	1	8	
Jeff Halpern	(United States)	C	2009—2010	16	0	2	2	12	6	0	0	0	4	
Doug Halward	(Canada)	D	1978—1981	141	16	65	81	161	2	0	0	0	14	
Gilles Hamel	(Canada)	LW	1988—1989	11	0	1	1	2	—	—	—	—	—	
Ken Hammond	(Canada)	D	1984—1988	62	8	12	20	82	5	0	0	0	8	
Rick Hampton	(Canada)	D	1978—1980	52	3	17	20	22	2	0	0	0	0	
Michal Handzus	(Slovakia)	C	2007—2011	327	57	78	135	135	12	4	3	7	4	
Alan Hangsleben	(United States)	LW	1981—1982	18	2	6	8	55	—	—	—	—	—	
Mark Hardy	(Canada)	D	1979—1988; 1993—1994	616	53	250	303	858	41	5	10	15	64	^{[note 7]}
Terry Harper	(Canada)	D	1972—1975	234	6	46	52	313	8	0	0	0	18	
Billy Harris	(Canada)	RW	1979—1984	128	27	39	66	54	8	2	1	3	2	
Peter Harrold	(United States)	D	2006—2011	164	8	18	26	50	0	0	0	0	0	
Rick Hayward	(Canada)	D	1990—1991	4	0	0	0	5	—	—	—	—	—	
Mark Heaslip	(United States)	RW	1978—1979	69	4	9	13	45	2	0	0	0	2	
Mike Heidt	(Canada)	D	1983—1984	6	0	1	1	7	—	—	—	—	—	
Steve Heinze	(United States)	RW	2001—2003	100	20	23	43	58	4	0	0	0	2	
Peter Helander	(Sweden)	D	1982—1983	7	0	1	1	0	—	—	—	—	—	
Samuel Helenius	(Finland)	C	2024—2026	103	9	7	16	75	10	0	1	1	14	
Jamie Heward	(Canada)	D	2006—2007	19	2	6	8	20	—	—	—	—	—	
Dennis Hextall	(Canada)	C	1969—1970	28	5	7	12	40	—	—	—	—	—	
Ernie Hicke	(Canada)	LW	1977—1978	41	9	15	24	18	—	—	—	—	—	
Jim Hiller	(Canada)	LW	1992—1993	40	6	6	12	90	—	—	—	—	—	
Larry Hillman	(Canada)	D	1971—1972	22	1	2	3	11	—	—	—	—	—	
Justin Hocking	(Canada)	D	1993—1994	1	0	0	0	0	—	—	—	—	—	
Phil Hoene	(United States)	LW	1972—1975	37	2	4	6	22	—	—	—	—	—	
Jim Hofford	(Canada)	D	1988—1989	1	0	0	0	2	—	—	—	—	—	
Dale Hoganson	(Canada)	D	1969—1972	129	6	19	25	103	—	—	—	—	—	
Jason Holland	(Canada)	D	2001—2004	57	3	4	7	24	—	—	—	—	—	
Warren Holmes	(Canada)	C	1981—1984	45	8	18	26	7	—	—	—	—	—	
Randy Holt	(Canada)	D	1978—1980	78	0	7	7	296	2	0	0	0	4	
Dean Hopkins	(Canada)	RW	1979—1983	217	23	49	72	302	18	1	5	6	29	
Doug Houda	(Canada)	D	1993—1994	54	2	6	8	165	—	—	—	—	—	
Ken Houston	(Canada)	RW	1983—1984	33	8	8	16	11	—	—	—	—	—	
Harry Howell	(Canada)	D	1970—1973	168	8	36	44	85	—	—	—	—	—	HHOF 1979
Don Howse	(Canada)	LW	1979—1980	33	2	5	7	6	2	0	0	0	0	
Bill Huard	(Canada)	LW	1999—2000	1	0	0	0	2	—	—	—	—	—	
Charlie Huddy	(Canada)	D	1991—1995	226	11	58	69	184	29	2	5	7	22	
Brent Hughes	(Canada)	D	1967—1970	168	7	36	43	217	18	1	3	4	47	
Howie Hughes	(Canada)	RW	1967—1970	168	25	32	57	30	—	14	2	0	2	
Trent Hunter	(Canada)	RW	2011—2012	38	2	5	7	8	–	–	—	—	—	
Dave Hutchison	(Canada)	D	1974—1978	232	6	37	43	605	20	1	7	8	68	
Ben Hutton	(Canada)	D	2019—2020	65	4	12	16	14	—	—	—	—	—	
Alex Iafallo	(United States)	C	2017—2023	420	85	119	204	80	16	5	4	9	10	
Jarome Iginla	(Canada)	RW	2016—2017	19	6	3	9	16	—	—	—	—	—	HHOF 2020
Bill Inglis	(Canada)	C	1967—1969	22	1	2	3	0	11	1	2	3	4	
Ted Irvine	(Canada)	LW	1967—1970	207	44	59	103	101	17	6	4	10	9	
Ulf Isaksson	(Sweden)	LW	1982—1983	50	7	15	22	10	—	—	—	—	—	
Raitis Ivanans	(Latvia)	LW	2006—2010	276	12	6	18	555	1	0	0	0	0	
Tim Jackman	(United States)	RW	2006—2007	5	0	0	0	10	—	—	—	—	—	
Connor James	(Canada)	LW	2005—2006	2	0	0	0	0	—	—	—	—	—	
Wes Jarvis	(Canada)	C	1983—1984	61	9	13	22	36	—	—	—	—	—	
Bob Jay	(United States)	D	1993—1994	3	0	1	1	0	—	—	—	—	—	
Tanner Jeannot	(Canada)	F	2024—2025	67	7	6	13	89	—	—	—	—	—	
Dean Jenkins	(United States)	RW	1983—1984	5	0	0	0	2	—	—	—	—	—	
Steve Jensen	(United States)	LW	1978—1982	267	71	61	132	177	10	0	2	2	9	
Trevor Johansen	(Canada)	D	1981—1982	46	3	7	10	69	—	—	—	—	—	
Craig Johnson	(United States)	LW	1995—2003	429	62	79	141	196	15	3	2	5	8	
Jack Johnson	(United States)	D	2006—2012	343	30	94	124	256	12	1	11	12	6	
Jim Johnson	(Canada)	C	1971—1972	28	8	9	17	6	—	—	—	—	—	
Matt Johnson	(Canada)	LW	1994—1999	182	6	8	14	681	4	0	0	0	6	
Larry Johnston	(Canada)	D	1967—1968	4	0	0	0	4	—	—	—	—	—	
Jussi Jokinen	(Finland)	C	2017—2018	18	1	4	5	4	—	—	—	—	—	
Olli Jokinen	(Finland)	C	1997—1999	74	9	12	21	50	—	—	—	—	—	
Caleb Jones	(United States)	D	2024—2025	6	0	0	0	2	—	—	—	—	—	
Brad Jones	(United States)	L	1990—1991	53	9	11	20	57	8	1	1	2	2	
Randy Jones	(Canada)	D	2009—2010	48	5	16	21	28	4	0	0	0	2	
Mathieu Joseph	(Canada)	RW	2025—2026	12	0	0	0	5	2	0	0	0	2	
Eddie Joyal	(Canada)	C	1967—1972	319	105	99	204	83	18	7	4	11	2	
Frantisek Kaberle	(Czech Republic)	D	1999—2000	37	0	9	9	4	—	—	—	—	—	
Arthur Kaliyev	(United States)	RW	2020—2024	188	35	36	71	63	9	0	0	0	2	
Petr Kanko	(Czech Republic)	RW	2005—2006	10	1	0	1	0	—	—	—	—	—	
Sheldon Kannegiesser	(Canada)	D	1973—1977	234	10	50	60	170	17	0	2	2	8	
Jere Karalahti	(Finland)	D	1999—2002	134	8	18	26	85	17	0	1	1	20	
Kyosti Karjalainen	(Sweden)	LW	1991—1992	28	1	8	9	12	3	0	1	1	2	
Steve Kasper	(Canada)	C	1988—1991	173	35	62	97	74	31	6	12	18	20	
John-Paul Kelly	(Canada)	LW	1979—1986	400	54	70	124	366	18	1	1	2	41	
Steve Kelly	(Canada)	C	2000—2004	37	3	4	7	6	9	0	0	0	2	
Adrian Kempe	(Sweden)	LW	2016—2026	711	230	244	474	429	32	16	15	31	16	
Dean Kennedy	(Canada)	D	1982—1989	345	13	62	75	591	20	0	5	5	28	
Dmitri Khristich	(Ukraine)	RW	1995—1997	151	46	74	120	82	—	—	—	—	—	
Brian Kilrea	(Canada)	C	1967—1968	25	3	5	8	12	—	—	—	—	—	
Dwight King	(Canada)	LW	2010–2017	348	52	56	108	96	69	10	15	25	37	SC 2012, 2014
Trent Klatt	(United States)	RW	2003—2004	82	17	26	43	46	—	—	—	—	—	
Jon Klemm	(Canada)	D	2007—2008	22	0	0	0	10	—	—	—	—	—	
Petr Klima	(Czech Republic)	RW	1996—1997	8	0	4	4	2	—	—	—	—	—	
Neil Komadoski	(Canada)	D	1972—1978	378	13	54	67	477	23	0	2	2	47	
Chris Kontos	(Canada)	C	1987—1990	19	6	13	19	8	20	11	0	11	12	
Anze Kopitar	(Slovenia)	C	2006—2026	1,521	452	864	1,316	358	107	27	62	89	45	SC 2012, 2014
Jerry Korab	(Canada)	D	1979—1983	211	18	84	102	354	17	0	3	3	70	
Tom Kostopoulos	(Canada)	RW	2005—2007	12	15	29	44	173	—	—	—	—	—	
Ilya Kovalchuk	(Russia)	LW	2018—2020	81	19	24	43	22	—	—	—	—	—	
Don Kozak	(Canada)	RW	1972—1978	409	94	81	175	450	26	6	2	8	69	
Skip Krake	(Canada)	C	1968—1970	88	8	26	34	97	6	1	0	1	15	
Mike Krushelnyski	(Canada)	C	1988—1991	156	43	66	109	170	21	2	7	9	16	
Bob Kudelski	(United States)	RW	1987—1993	269	72	54	126	170	22	4	4	8	4	
Rasmus Kupari	(Finland)	C	2020—2023	130	9	20	29	32	11	0	0	0	2	
Jari Kurri	(Finland)	RW	1991—1996	331	108	185	293	171	28	10	10	20	16	HHOF 2001
Andrei Kuzmenko	(Russia)	F	2024—2026	74	18	24	42	18	7	3	3	6	4	
Maxim Kuznetsov	(Russia)	D	2002—2004	19	0	1	1	20	—	—	—	—	—	
Gord Labossiere	(Canada)	C	1967—1971	161	34	55	89	59	7	2	3	5	24	
Eric Lacroix	(Canada)	LW	1994—1999	144	25	24	49	176	—	—	—	—	—	
Paul LaDue	(United States)	D	2016—2020	69	5	13	18	22	2	1	0	1	0	
Nathan LaFayette	(Canada)	C	1995—1999	94	10	12	22	81	4	0	0	0	2	
Alex Laferriere	(United States)	RW	2024—2026	240	52	57	109	84	15	1	8	9	2	
Bob Laforest	(Canada)	RW	1983—1984	5	1	0	1	2	—	—	—	—	—	
Tom Laidlaw	(Canada)	D	1986—1990	195	5	40	45	156	21	2	5	7	12	
Brooks Laich	(Canada)	C	2017—2018	12	0	1	1	6	—	—	—	—	—	
Robert Lang	(Czech Republic)	C	1992—1996	147	19	39	58	26	—	—	—	—	—	
Dave Langevin	(United States)	D	1986—1987	11	0	4	7	26	—	—	—	—	—	
Ian Laperriere	(Canada)	RW	1995—2004	595	61	104	165	1,017	28	2	3	5	29	
Rick Lapointe	(Canada)	D	1984—1986	93	4	17	21	64	—	—	—	—	—	
Denis Larocque	(Canada)	D	1987—1988	8	0	1	1	18	—	—	—	—	—	
Steve Larouche	(Canada)	D	1995—1996	7	1	2	3	4	—	—	—	—	—	
Craig Laughlin	(Canada)	RW	1987—1988	19	4	8	12	6	3	0	1	1	2	
Scott Laughton	(Canada)	C	2025—2026	21	5	3	8	14	4	0	0	0	0	
Kevin LaVallee	(Canada)	LW	1983—1984	19	3	3	6	2	—	—	—	—	—	
Eric Lavigne	(Canada)	D	1994—1995	1	0	0	0	0	—	—	—	—	—	
Dominic Lavoie	(Canada)	D	1993—1994	8	3	3	6	2	—	—	—	—	—	
Vincent Lecavalier	(Canada)	C	2015—2016	42	10	7	17	20	5	1	1	2	2	
Grant Ledyard	(Canada)	D	1985—1988	142	22	48	70	223	5	0	0	0	10	
Andre Lee	(Sweden)	LW	2024—2026	26	2	3	5	11	—	—	—	—	—	
Brendan Leipsic	(Canada)	LW	2018—2019	45	5	13	18	22	—	—	—	—	—	
Brendan Lemieux	(Canada)	LW	2020—2023	95	10	10	20	164	7	1	0	1	18	
Jacques Lemieux	(Canada)	D	1967—1970	19	0	4	4	8	1	0	0	0	0	
Real Lemieux	(Canada)	LW	1967—1974	382	46	97	143	207	18	2	4	6	10	
Bill Lesuk	(Canada)	RW	1971—1974	129	12	25	37	136	2	0	0	0	4	
Guy Leveque	(Canada)	C	1992—1994	17	2	2	4	21	—	—	—	—	—	
Dave Lewis	(Canada)	D	1979—1983	221	5	36	41	238	18	0	7	7	42	
Trevor Lewis	(United States)	C	2009—2020; 2023—2025	816	84	107	191	211	86	11	12	23	20	SC 2012, 2014
Igor Liba	(Czechoslovakia)	LW	1988—1989	27	5	13	18	21	2	0	0	0	2	
Andreas Lilja	(Sweden)	D	2000—2003	45	1	7	8	40	6	0	0	0	6	
Mikael Lindholm	(Sweden)	C	1989—1990	18	2	2	4	2	—	—	—	—	—	
Blake Lizotte	(United States)	C	2018—2024	320	37	69	106	154	15	1	1	2	20	
Lonnie Loach	(Canada)	LW	1992—1993	50	10	13	23	27	1	0	0	0	0	
Bob Logan	(Canada)	RW	1988—1989	4	0	0	0	0	—	—	—	—	—	
Andrei Loktionov	(Russia)	C	2009—2012	59	7	7	14	4	2	0	0	0	0	
Barry Long	(Canada)	D	1972—1974	130	5	32	37	166	5	0	1	1	18	
Ross Lonsberry	(Canada)	LW	1969—1972	202	54	64	118	237	—	—	—	—	—	
Don Luce	(Canada)	C	1980—1981	10	1	0	1	2	4	0	2	2	2	
Milan Lucic	(Canada)	LW	2015—2016	81	20	35	55	79	5	0	3	3	4	
Matt Luff	(Canada)	RW	2018—2021	64	10	7	17	16	—	—	—	—	—	
Morris Lukowich	(Canada)	LW	1985—1987	115	25	30	55	115	3	0	0	0	8	
Jamie Lundmark	(Canada)	C	2006—2007	29	7	2	9	25	—	—	—	—	—	
Olli Maatta	(Finland)	D	2020—2022	107	1	11	12	16	7	0	0	0	0	
Kurtis MacDermid	(Canada)	D	2017—2021	118	6	11	17	151	—	—	—	—	—	
Lowell MacDonald	(Canada)	LW	1967—1969	132	35	38	73	22	—	5	7	12	2	
Zack MacEwen	(Canada)	C	2022—2023	10	0	1	1	12	1	0	0	0	2	
Donald MacLean	(Canada)	C	1997—1998	22	5	2	7	4	—	—	—	—	—	
Brian MacLellan	(Canada)	LW	1982—1986	187	61	94	155	124	3	0	1		0	
Adam Mair	(Canada)	C	2000—2002	28	1	1	2	63	—	—	—	—	—	
Mikko Makela	(Finland)	RW	1989—1990	45	7	14	21	16	1	0	0	0	0	
Dan Maloney	(Canada)	LW	1972—1975	159	46	63	109	296	8	0	0	0	4	
Jeff Malott	(Canada)	F	2024—2026	70	3	7	10	62	4	0	0	0	14	
Randy Manery	(Canada)	D	1977—1980	202	20	64	84	173	4	0	0	0	8	
Chris Marinucci	(United States)	C	1996—1997	1	0	0	0	0	—	—	—	—	—	
Gilles Marotte	(Canada)	D	1969—1974	271	23	107	130	304	—	—	—	—	—	
Mike Marson	(Canada)	RW	1979—1980	3	0	0	0	5	—	—	—	—	—	
Rick Martin	(Canada)	LW	1980—1982	4	2	4	6	2	1	0	0	0	0	
Alec Martinez	(United States)	D	2009—2020	597	62	136	198	185	64	6	10	16	30	SC 2012, 2014
Chris McAlpine	(United States)	D	2002—2003	21	0	2	2	24	—	—	—	—	—	
Jamie McBain	(United States)	D	2014—2016	70	5	13	18	10	4	0	0	0	2	
Wayne McBean	(Canada)	D	1987—1989	60	0	6	6	49	—	—	—	—	—	
Brayden McNabb	(Canada)	D	2014—2017	201	6	36	42	198	—	—	—	—	—	
Alyn McCauley	(Canada)	C	2006—2007	10	1	0	1	2	—	—	—	—	—	
Shawn McCosh	(Canada)	C	1991—1992	4	0	0	0	4	—	—	—	—	—	
Al McDonough	(Canada)	RW	1970—1972	37	5	3	8	8	—	—	—	—	—	
Hubie McDonough	(United States)	C	1988—1990	26	3	5	8	10	—	—	—	—	—	
Shawn McEachern	(United States)	LW	1993—1994	49	8	13	21	24	—	—	—	—	—	
Mike McEwen	(Canada)	D	1983—1984	47	10	24	34	14	—	—	—	—	—	
John McIntyre	(Canada)	C	1990—1993	178	15	29	44	295	18	0	5	5	36	
Sean McKenna	(Canada)	RW	1985—1988	129	21	21	42	29	5	0	1	1	0	
Steve McKenna	(Canada)	LW	1996—2000	137	5	9	14	348	3	0	1	1	8	
Brian McReynolds	(Canada)	C	1993—1994	20	1	3	4	4	—	—	—	—	—	
Marty McSorley	(Canada)	D	1988—1996	472	71	163	234	1,846	63	6	11	17	190	
Howie Menard	(Canada)	C	1967—1969	91	19	32	51	63	18	3	7	10	36	
Michael Mersch	(United States)	LW	2015—2016	17	1	2	3	0	—	—	—	—	—	
Larry Mickey	(Canada)	RW	1970—1971	65	6	12	18	46	—	—	—	—	—	
Bill Mikkelson	(Canada)	D	1971—1972	15	0	1	1	6	—	—	—	—	—	
Corey Millen	(United States)	C	1991—1993	88	43	37	80	86	29	2	5	7	18	
Aaron Miller	(United States)	D	2000—2007	309	7	40	47	211	20	0	1	1	6	
Bob Miller	(United States)	C	1984—1985	63	4	16	20	35	2	0	1	1	0	
Jay Miller	(United States)	LW	1988—1992	230	27	24	51	865	34	2	3	5	102	
Torrey Mitchell	(Canada)	C	2017—2018	49	6	5	11	28	4	0	0	0	0	
Willie Mitchell	(Canada)	D	2010–2012; 2013–2014	209	11	35	46	123	44	3	6	9	36	SC 2012, 2014
Fredrik Modin	(Sweden)	LW	2009—2010	20	3	2	5	14	6	3	1	4	2	
Jaroslav Modry	(Czech Republic)	D	1995—1997; 1998—2004; 2006—2008	454	35	129	164	338	19	1	2	3	6	
Sandy Moger	(Canada)	RW	1997—1999	104	14	15	29	96	—	—	—	—	—	
Carl Mokosak	(Canada)	LW	1984—1985	30	4	8	12	43	—	—	—	—	—	
Oscar Moller	(Sweden)	C	2008—2010	87	12	14	26	22	1	0	0	0	0	
Garry Monahan	(Canada)	LW	1969—1970	21	0	3	3	12	—	—	—	—	—	
Hartland Monahan	(Canada)	RW	1977—1978	64	10	9	19	45	2	0	0	0	0	
Bob Mongrain	(Canada)	C	1985—1986	11	2	3	5	2	—	—	—	—	—	
Trevor Moore	(United States)	LW	2019—2026	433	102	132	234	104	28	7	8	15	20	
Ethan Moreau	(Canada)	LW	2011—2012	28	1	3	4	28	—	—	—	—	—	
Jason Morgan	(Canada)	C	1996—1998	14	1	0	1	4	—	—	—	—	—	
Dave Morrison	(Canada)	RW	1980—1983	31	3	3	6	4	—	—	—	—	—	
Matt Moulson	(Canada)	LW	2007—2009	29	6	4	10	6	—	—	—	—	—	
Jacob Moverare	(Sweden)	D	2021—2026	109	2	9	11	18	2	0	0	0	0	
Jim Moxey	(Canada)	RW	1976—1977	1	0	0	0	2	—	—	—	—	—	
Bryan Muir	(Canada)	D	2003—2004	2	0	1	1	2	—	—	—	—	—	
Richard Mulhern	(Canada)	D	1978—1980	51	2	12	14	39	1	0	0	0	0	
Paul Mulvey	(Canada)	LW	1981—1982	11	0	7	7	50	—	—	—	—	—	
Bob Murdoch	(Canada)	D	1973—1979	414	41	130	171	497	28	2	10	12	40	
Larry Murphy	(Canada)	D	1980—1984	242	52	155	207	255	14	5	8	13	14	HHOF 2004
Mike Murphy	(Canada)	RW	1973—1983	673	194	263	457	442	45	11	20	31	48	
Rob Murphy	(Canada)	C	1993—1994	8	0	1	1	22	—	—	—	—	—	
Brady Murray	(United States)	LW	2007—2008	4	1	0	1	6	—	—	—	—	—	^{[note 8]}
Glen Murray	(Canada)	RW	1996—2002	304	103	108	211	190	21	6	3	9	12	
Jim Murray	(Canada)	D	1967—1968	30	0	2	2	14	—	—	—	—	—	
Marty Murray	(Canada)	C	2006—2007	19	0	2	2	4	—	—	—	—	—	
Jake Muzzin	(Canada)	D	2010–2019	496	51	162	213	298	50	7	13	20	18	SC 2014
Ladislav Nagy	(Slovakia)	LW	2007—2008	38	9	17	26	18	—	—	—	—	—	
Victor Nechayev	(Soviet Union)	C	1982—1983	3	1	0	1	0	—	—	—	—	—	
Jan Nemecek	(Czech Republic)	D	1998—2000	7	1	0	1	4	—	—	—	—	—	
Bob Nevin	(Canada)	RW	1973—1976	235	64	113	177	45	17	3	1	4	6	
Bernie Nicholls	(Canada)	C	1981—1990	602	327	431	758	765	34	16	21	37	61	
Jordan Nolan	(Canada)	C	2011—2017	292	20	22	42	264	30	1	1	2	27	SC 2012, 2014
Mattias Norstrom	(Sweden)	D	1995—2007	780	14	128	142	583	28	0	2	2	30	
Brad Norton	(United States)	D	2002—2004	73	3	4	7	174	—	—	—	—	—	
Kai Nurminen	(Finland)	LW	1996—1997	67	16	11	27	22	—	—	—	—	—	
Sean O'Donnell	(Canada)	D	1994—2000; 2008—2010	541	15	83	98	940	14	2	1	3	44	
Billy O'Dwyer	(United States)	C	1983—1985	18	1	0	1	15	—	—	—	—	—	
Patrick O'Sullivan	(United States)	C	2006—2009	188	41	68	109	66	—	—	—	—	—	
Ed Olczyk	(United States)	RW	1996—1997	67	21	23	44	45	—	—	—	—	—	
Jim Paek	(Canada)	D	1993—1994	18	1	1	02	10	—	—	—	—	—	^{[note 9]}
Zigmund Palffy	(Slovakia)	RW	1999—2004	311	150	190	340	137	24	9	10	19	8	
Rob Palmer	(Canada)	D	1977—1982	222	8	86	94	84	8	1	2	3	6	
Artemi Panarin	(Russia)	LW	2025—2026	26	9	18	27	6	4	2	1	3	0	
Mark Parrish	(United States)	RW	2005—2006	19	5	3	8	4	—	—	—	—	—	
George Parros	(United States)	RW	2005—2006	55	2	3	5	138	—	—	—	—	—	
Scott Parse	(United States)	LW	2009—2012	73	14	16	30	36	6	0	0	0	0	
Dave Pasin	(Canada)	RW	1988—1989	5	0	0	0	0	—	—	—	—	—	
Joe Paterson	(Canada)	LW	1985—1988	124	12	22	34	424	2	0	0	0	0	
Tanner Pearson	(Canada)	LW	2012—2019	325	69	75	144	88	34	5	10	15	10	SC 2014
Dustin Penner	(Canada)	LW	2010–2013	117	11	26	37	63	44	7	11	18	44	SC 2012
Yanic Perreault	(Canada)	C	1994—1999	288	76	80	156	118	4	1	2	3	6	
Corey Perry	(Canada)	RW	2025—2026	50	11	17	28	59	—	—	—	—	—	
Jimmy Peters, Jr.	(Canada)	C	1968—1975	255	31	29	60	38	11	0	2	2	2	
Richard Petiot	(Canada)	D	2005—2006	2	0	0	0	2	—	—	—	—	—	
Michel Petit	(Canada)	D	1994—1996	49	5	13	18	111	—	—	—	—	—	
Lyle Phair	(Canada)	D	1985—1988	48	6	7	13	12	1	0	0	0	0	
Dion Phaneuf	(Canada)	D	2017—2019	93	4	12	16	68	4	0	1	1	4	
Esa Pirnes	(Finland)	C	2003—2004	57	3	8	11	12	—	—	—	—	—	
Joe Piskula	(United States)	C	2006—2007	5	0	0	0	6	—	—	—	—	—	
Larry Playfair	(Canada)	D	1985—1989	111	2	18	20	420	3	0	0	0	14	
Jason Podollan	(Canada)	C	1998—2000	7	0	1	1	7	—	—	—	—	—	
Alexei Ponikarovsky	(Ukraine)	LW	2010–2011	61	5	10	15	36	4	1	0	1	0	
Poul Popiel	(Canada)	D	1967—1968	1	0	0	0	0	3	1	0	1	4	
Barry Potomski	(Canada)	LW	1995—1997	59	6	4	10	197	—	—	—	—	—	
Jean Potvin	(Canada)	D	1970—1972	43	3	6	9	37	—	—	—	—	—	
Marc Potvin	(Canada)	RW	1992—1994	23	0	1	1	87	1	0	0	0	0	
Petr Prajsler	(Czechoslovakia)	D	1987—1990	43	3	10	13	49	4	0	0	0	0	
Tom Preissing	(United States)	D	2007—2009	99	11	20	31	22	—	—	—	—	—	
Noel Price	(Canada)	D	1970—1971	62	1	19	20	29	—	—	—	—	—	
Nikolai Prokhorkin	(Russia)	LW	2019—2020	43	4	10	14	6	—	—	—	—	—	
Sean Pronger	(Canada)	C	1998—1999	13	0	1	1	4	—	—	—	—	—	
Bob Pulford	(Canada)	LW	1970—1972	132	30	50	80	101	—	—	—	—	—	HHOF 1991
Teddy Purcell	(Canada)	RW	2007—2010; 2016—2017	103	8	19	27	8	—	—	—	—	—	
Konstantin Pushkarev	(Kazakhstan)	RW	2005—2007	17	2	3	5	8	—	—	—	—	—	
Kyle Quincey	(Canada)	D	2008—2009	72	4	34	38	63	—	—	—	—	—	
Dan Quinn	(Canada)	C	1994—1995	44	14	17	31	32	—	—	—	—	—	
Erik Rasmussen	(United States)	C	2002—2003	57	4	12	16	28	—	—	—	—	—	
Matt Ravlich	(Canada)	D	1969—1971	87	6	23	29	75	—	—	—	—	—	
Craig Redmond	(Canada)	D	1984—1988	170	13	58	71	122	3	1	0	1	2	
Keith Redmond	(Canada)	LW	1993—1994	12	1	0	1	20	—	—	—	—	—	
Robyn Regehr	(Canada)	D	2012—2015	158	6	23	29	93	26	0	3	3	14	SC 2014
Steven Reinprecht	(Canada)	C	1999—2001	60	12	17	29	14	—	—	—	—	—	
Sheldon Rempal	(Canada)	RW	2018—2019	7	0	0	0	0	—	—	—	—	—	
Mike Richards	(Canada)	C	2011—2015	257	46	87	133	180	61	10	27	37	42	SC 2012, 2014
Brad Richardson	(Canada)	C	2008—2013	255	24	41	65	135	36	4	5	9	8	SC 2012
Steve Richmond	(United States)	D	1988—1989	9	0	2	2	26	—	—	—	—	—	
Tobias Rieder	(Germany)	C	2017—2018	20	4	2	6	0	4	0	0	0	0	
Doug Robinson	(Canada)	LW	1967—1971	126	26	32	58	16	7	4	3	7	0	
Larry Robinson	(Canada)	D	1989—1992	182	11	64	75	87	24	3	7	10	25	HHOF 1995
Luc Robitaille	(Canada)	LW	1986—1994; 1997—2001; 2003—2006	1,077	557	597	1,154	924	94	41	48	89	126	HHOF 2010; Ret # 20^{[note 10]}
Randy Robitaille	(Canada)	C	2001—2002	18	4	3	7	17	—	—	—	—	—	
Leon Rochefort	(Canada)	RW	1969—1970	76	9	23	32	14	—	—	—	—	—	
Jeremy Roenick	(United States)	C	2005—2006	58	9	13	22	36	—	—	—	—	—	HHOF 2024
Dale Rolfe	(Canada)	D	1967—1970	198	7	41	48	246	17	0	5	5	22	
Cliff Ronning	(Canada)	C	2001—2002	14	1	4	5	8	4	0	1	1	2	
Pavel Rosa	(Czech Republic)	RW	1998—2004	36	5	13	18	6	—	—	—	—	—	
Randy Rota	(Canada)	C	1973—1974	58	10	6	16	16	5	0	1	1	0	
Matt Roy	(United States)	D	2018—2024	369	24	82	106	118	18	1	5	6	2	
Terry Ruskowski	(Canada)	C	1982—1985	226	37	88	125	360	3	0	2	2	0	
Joakim Ryan	(Sweden)	D	2019—2020	35	1	4	5	10	—	—	—	—	—	
Matt Ryan	(Canada)	C	2005—2006	12	0	1	1	2	—	—	—	—	—	
Warren Rychel	(Canada)	LW	1992—1995	157	16	16	32	655	23	6	7	13	39	
Drake Rymsha	(United States)	C	2020—2021	1	0	0	0	0	—	—	—	—	—	
Tomas Sandstrom	(Sweden)	RW	1989—1994	235	117	137	254	320	50	17	28	45	53	
Gary Sargent	(United States)	D	1975—1978	215	29	90	119	153	11	3	4	7	6	
Tim Schaller	(United States)	C	2019—2020	2	0	0	0	0	—	—	—	—	—	
Kevin Schamehorn	(Canada)	RW	1980—1981	5	0	0	0	4	—	—	—	—	—	
Brayden Schenn	(Canada)	RW	2009—2011	9	0	2	2	0	—	—	—	—	—	
Luke Schenn	(Canada)	D	2015—2016	43	2	9	11	52	5	1	1	2	6	
Nikita Scherbak	(Russia)	RW	2018—2019	8	1	0	1	2	—	—	—	—	—	
Chris Schmidt	(Canada)	C	2002—2003	10	0	2	2	5	—	—	—	—	—	
Mathieu Schneider	(United States)	D	2000—2003	193	37	87	124	181	20	0	10	10	28	
Dave Schultz	(Canada)	LW	1976—1978	84	12	20	32	259	9	1	1	2	45	
Jeff Schultz	(Canada)	D	2013—2016	10	0	1	1	4	7	0	0	0	0	
Howard Scruton	(Canada)	D	1982—1983	4	0	4	4	9	—	—	—	—	—	
Rob Scuderi	(United States)	D	2009—2013; 2015—2016	306	4	49	53	59	50	0	6	6	10	SC 2012
Brandon Segal	(Canada)	RW	2009—2010	25	1	1	2	20	—	—	—	—	—	
Steve Seguin	(Canada)	RW	1984—1985	5	0	0	0	9	—	—	—	—	—	
Andrej Sekera	(Slovakia)	D	2014—2015	16	1	3	4	6	—	—	—	—	—	
Brad Selwood	(Canada)	D	1979—1980	63	1	13	14	82	1	0	0	0	0	
Brandy Semchuk	(Canada)	RW	1992—1993	1	0	0	0	2	—	—	—	—	—	
Devin Setoguchi	(Canada)	RW	2016—2017	45	4	8	12	14	—	—	—	—	—	
Eddie Shack	(Canada)	LW	1969—1971	84	24	14	38	121	—	—	—	—	—	
Bobby Sheehan	(United States)	C	1981—1982	4	0	0	0	2	—	—	—	—	—	
Jeff Shevalier	(Canada)	LW	1994—1997	27	5	9	14	6	—	—	—	—	—	
Nick Shore	(United States)	C	2014—2018	221	14	35	49	74	1	0	0	0	0	
Steve Short	(United States)	LW	1977—1978	5	0	0	0	2	—	—	—	—	—	
Gary Shuchuk	(Canada)	C	1992—1996	136	12	24	36	64	17	2	2	4	12	
Steve Shutt	(Canada)	LW	1984—1985	59	16	25	41	10	3	0	0	0	4	HHOF 1993
Jon Sim	(Canada)	LW	2002—2004	62	6	9	15	46	—	—	—	—	—	
Charlie Simmer	(Canada)	LW	1977—1985	384	222	224	466	320	15	7	7	14	24	
Wayne Simmonds	(Canada)	RW	2008—2011	240	39	54	93	264	12	3	3	6	29	
Al Sims	(Canada)	D	1981—1983	9	1	1	2	16	—	—	—	—	—	
Ilkka Sinisalo	(Finland)	RW	1990—1992	10	0	1	1	4	2	0	1	1	0	
John Slaney	(Canada)	D	1995—1997	63	9	22	31	14	—	—	—	—	—	
Brian Smith	(Canada)	LW	1967—1968	58	10	9	19	33	7	0	0	0	0	
Dennis Smith	(United States)	D	1990—1991	4	0	0	0	4	—	—	—	—	—	
Doug Smith	(Canada)	C	1981—1986	304	72	74	146	218	13	4	2	6	15	
Jerred Smithson	(Canada)	RW	2002—2004	30	0	3	3	25	—	—	—	—	—	
Bryan Smolinski	(United States)	C	1999—2003	295	78	113	191	162	24	3	5	8	18	
Brad Smyth	(Canada)	RW	1996—1998	53	9	11	20	78	—	—	—	—	—	
Ryan Smyth	(Canada)	LW	2009—2011	149	45	55	100	77	12	3	4	7	6	
Chris Snell	(Canada)	D	1994—1995	32	2	7	9	22	—	—	—	—	—	
Brent Sopel	(Canada)	D	2005—2006	55	4	20	24	20	—	—	—	—	—	
Jordan Spence	(Canada)	D	2021—2025	180	8	53	61	30	13	1	1	2	0	
Andre St. Laurent	(Canada)	C	1979—1982	115	18	34	52	179	7	1	1	2	9	
Frank St. Marseille	(Canada)	RW	1972—1977	304	54	114	168	124	26	1	1	2	2	
Lorne Stamler	(Canada)	LW	1976—1978	9	2	1	3	2	—	—	—	—	—	
Jim Stanfield	(Canada)	C	1969—1972	7	0	1	1	0	—	—	—	—	—	
Troy Stecher	(Canada)	D	2021—2022	13	0	1	1	4	4	2	2	4	0	
Pete Stemkowski	(Canada)	C	1977—1978	80	13	18	31	33	2	1	0	1	2	
Shay Stephenson	(Canada)	LW	2006—2007	2	0	0	0	0	—	—	—	—	—	
Kevin Stevens	(Canada)	LW	1995—1997	89	17	30	47	118	—	—	—	—	—	
Jarret Stoll	(Canada)	C	2008—2015	506	81	133	214	344	69	6	10	16	44	SC 2012, 2014
Martin Straka	(Czech Republic)	C	2003—2004	32	6	8	14	4	—	—	—	—	—	
Austin Strand	(Canada)	D	2020—2022	21	0	3	3	8	—	—	—	—	—	
Martin Strbak	(Slovakia)	D	2003—2004	5	2	0	2	8	—	—	—	—	—	
Brad Stuart	(Canada)	D	2007—2008	63	5	16	21	67	—	—	—	—	—	
Jozef Stumpel	(Slovakia)	C	1997—2002; 2003—2004	334	76	191	267	107	21	4	11	15	20	
Marco Sturm	(Germany)	LW	2010—2011	17	4	5	9	17	—	—	—	—	—	
Darryl Sydor	(Canada)	D	1991—1996	288	20	85	105	249	24	3	8	11	16	
Phil Sykes	(Canada)	LW	1982—1989	286	54	67	121	362	15	0	2	2	20	
Jeff Tambellini	(Canada)	LW	2005—2006	4	0	0	0	2	—	—	—	—	—	
Patrice Tardif	(Canada)	C	1995—1996	15	1	1	2	37	—	—	—	—	—	
Dave Taylor	(Canada)	RW	1977—1994	1,111	431	638	1,069	1,589	92	26	33	59	149	Ret # 18
Greg Terrion	(Canada)	C	1980—1982	134	27	47	74	122	3	1	0	1	4	
Akil Thomas	(Canada)	C	2023—2025	32	4	3	7	9	—	—	—	—	—	
Scott Thomas	(United States)	RW	2000—2001	24	3	1	4	9	12	1	0	1	4	
Dave Thomlinson	(Canada)	LW	1993—1995	8	0	0	0	21	—	—	—	—	—	
Brent Thompson	(Canada)	D	1991—1994	81	1	9	10	246	4	0	0	0	4	
Nate Thompson	(United States)	C	2017—2019	79	5	7	12	27	4	0	0	0	0	
Jim Thomson	(Canada)	RW	1990—1993	62	2	2	4	237	1	0	0	0	0	
Scott Thornton	(Canada)	LW	2006—2008	105	12	9	21	124	—	—	—	—	—	
Vladimir Tkachev	(Russia)	F	2021—2022	4	0	2	2	2	—	—	—	—	—	
Rick Tocchet	(Canada)	RW	1994—1996	80	31	40	71	187	—	—	—	—	—	
Kevin Todd	(Canada)	C	1993—1996	119	22	43	65	58	—	—	—	—	—	
Tyler Toffoli	(Canada)	C	2012—2020	515	139	151	290	146	47	9	12	21	12	SC 2014
John Tonelli	(Canada)	LW	1988—1991	221	76	86	162	221	28	3	6	9	26	
Tim Tookey	(Canada)	C	1987—1989	27	3	7	10	12	—	—	—	—	—	
Brock Tredway	(Canada)	C	1981—1982	—	—	—	—	—	1	0	0	0	0	
John Tripp	(Germany)	RW	2003—2004	34	1	5	6	33	—	—	—	—	—	^{[note 11]}
Denis Tsygurov	(Russia)	D	1994—1996	39	1	5	6	33	—	—	—	—	—	
Vladimir Tsyplakov	(Belarus)	LW	1995—2000	261	56	81	137	70	4	0	1	1	8	
Al Tuer	(Canada)	D	1985—1986	45	0	1	1	150	—	—	—	—	—	
Lauri Tukonen	(Finland)	RW	2006—2008	5	0	0	0	0	—	—	—	—	—	
Marko Tuomainen	(Finland)	RW	1999—2001	74	9	9	18	84	1	0	0	0	0	
Alex Turcotte	(United States)	C	2021—2026	162	13	30	43	54	4	0	0	0	0	
Ian Turnbull	(Canada)	D	1981—1982	42	11	15	26	81	—	—	—	—	—	
Dean Turner	(United States)	D	1982—1983	3	0	0	0	4	—	—	—	—	—	
Oleg Tverdovsky	(Russia)	D	2006—2007	26	0	4	4	10	—	—	—	—	—	
T. J. Tynan	(United States)	C	2021—2022	2	0	0	0	0	—	—	—	—	—	
Garry Unger	(Canada)	C	1980—1981	58	10	10	20	40	—	—	—	—	—	
David Van der Gulik	(Canada)	RW	2014—2015	1	0	0	0	0	—	—	—	—	—	
Rob Valicevic	(United States)	RW	2001—2002	17	1	1	2	8	—	—	—	—	—	
Vic Venasky	(Canada)	C	1972—1979	430	61	101	162	66	21	1	5	6	12	
Kris Versteeg	(Canada)	LW	2015—2016	14	4	1	5	9	5	1	1	2	0	
Linden Vey	(Canada)	RW	2013-2014	18	0	5	5	0	—	—	—	—	—	
Gabriel Vilardi	(Canada)	C	2019—2023	152	41	37	78	36	7	2	2	4	0	
Mark Visheau	(Canada)	D	1998—1999	28	1	3	4	107	—	—	—	—	—	
Lubomir Visnovsky	(Slovakia)	D	2000—2008	499	70	209	279	214	12	0	1	1	0	
Tomas Vlasak	(Czech Republic)	C	2000—2001	10	1	3	4	2	—	—	—	—	—	
Doug Volmar	(United States)	RW	1972—1973	21	4	2	6	16	—	—	—	—	—	
Jan Vopat	(Czech Republic)	D	1995—1998	65	6	14	20	36	2	0	1	1	2	
Roman Vopat	(Czech Republic)	LW	1996—1999	57	4	8	12	121	—	—	—	—	—	
Slava Voynov	(Russia)	D	2011—2015	190	18	63	81	72	64	9	16	25	20	SC 2012, 2014
Don Waddell	(United States)	C	1980—1981	1	0	0	0	0	—	—	—	—	—	
Austin Wagner	(Canada)	LW	2018—2021	171	22	18	40	70	—	—	—	—	—	
Gordie Walker	(Canada)	LW	1988—1990	12	1	0	1	2	—	—	—	—	—	
Russ Walker	(Canada)	RW	1976—1978	17	1	0	1	41	—	—	—	—	—	
Sean Walker	(Canada)	D	2018—2023	232	16	51	67	92	2	0	0	0	0	
Bob Wall	(Canada)	D	1967—1970	212	23	44	67	108	15	0	3	3	0	
Dixon Ward	(Canada)	LW	1993—1994	34	6	2	8	45	—	—	—	—	—	
Jason Ward	(Canada)	RW	2006—2007	7	0	1	1	4	—	—	—	—	—	
Taylor Ward	(Canada)	F	2024—2026	37	4	4	8	7	1	0	0	0	0	
Tim Watters	(Canada)	D	1988—1995	303	5	50	55	529	50	0	3	3	62	
Jordan Weal	(Canada)	C	2015—2016	10	0	0	0	2	—	—	—	—	—	
Mike Weaver	(Canada)	D	2005—2007	92	3	15	18	30	—	—	—	—	—	
Jay Wells	(Canada)	D	1979—1988	604	34	143	177	1,446	31	3	8	11	110	
Kevin Westgarth	(Canada)	RW	2008—2012	90	1	4	5	153	6	0	2	2	14	SC 2012
Bill White	(Canada)	D	1967—1970	189	20	66	86	159	18	3	6	9	12	
Sean Whyte	(Canada)	RW	1991—1993	21	0	2	2	12	—	—	—	—	—	
Juha Widing	(Sweden)	C	1969—1977	502	131	211	342	188	8	1	2	3	2	
Jim Wiemer	(Canada)	D	1988—1989	9	2	3	5	20	10	2	1	3	19	
Brian Wilks	(Canada)	C	1984—1989	48	4	8	12	27	—	—	—	—	—	
Darryl Williams	(Canada)	RW	1992—1993	2	0	0	0	10	—	—	—	—	—	
Tiger Williams	(Canada)	LW	1984—1988	162	40	50	90	727	8	3	2	5	34	
Justin Williams	(Canada)	RW	2008—2015	427	103	163	266	249	73	22	32	54	59	SC 2012, 2014
Tom Williams	(Canada)	LW	1973—1979	372	114	135	249	67	29	8	7	15	4	
Brian Willsie	(Canada)	RW	2006—2008	134	15	18	33	79	—	—	—	—	—	
Bert Wilson	(Canada)	LW	1979—1980	317	24	32	56	437	20	0	2	2	42	
Murray Wilson	(Canada)	LW	1978—1979	58	11	15	26	14	1	0	0	0	0	
Jim Witherspoon	(Canada)	D	1975—1976	2	0	0	0	2	—	—	—	—	—	
Christian Wolanin	(Canada)	D	2020—2022	11	1	1	2	4	—	—	—	—	—	
Bob Woytowich	(Canada)	D	1971—1972	36	0	4	4	6	—	—	—	—	—	
Jared Wright	(United States)	RW	2025—2026	23	0	4	4	4	4	0	0	0	0	
Vitali Yachmenev	(Russia)	RW	1995—1998	149	29	57	86	30	—	—	—	—	—	
Dmitri Yushkevich	(Russia)	D	2002—2003	42	0	3	3	24	—	—	—	—	—	
John Zeiler	(United States)	RW	2006—2009	90	1	4	5	87	—	—	—	—	—	
Alexei Zhitnik	(Russia)	D	1992—1995	170	26	81	107	208	24	3	9	12	26	
Tomas Zizka	(Czech Republic)	D	2002—2004	25	2	6	8	16	—	—	—	—	—	
Doug Zmolek	(United States)	D	1995—1998	119	2	8	10	249	2	0	0	0	2	

== Statistical notes ==
a: As of the 2005–2006 NHL season, all games will have a winner; teams losing in overtime and shootouts are awarded one point; thus the OTL stat replacees the tie statistic. The OTL column also includes SOL (shootout losses).
b: Save percentage did not become an official NHL statistic until the 1982–83 season. Therefore, goaltenders who played before 1982 do not have official save percentages.

== Player notes ==
1: Byron Dafoe was born in Sussex, England, but he grew up in British Columbia, Canada. However, he never represented Canada in international play.
2: Yutaka Fukufuji is the first Japanese-born player in NHL history.
3: Kevin Brown was born in Birmingham, England, but moved to Canada as a child. However, he never represented Canada in international play.
4:Rick Chartraw was born in Caracas, Venezuela, but moved to Erie, Pennsylvania, at the age of four. Chartraw never represented the United States in international play.
5: Adam Deadmarsh was born in Trail, British Columbia, but held dual citizenship and chose to represent the United States in international play.
6: Randy Gilhen was born in Zweubruken, Germany but grew up in Winnipeg, Manitoba. However, Gilhen never represented Canada in international play.
7: Mark Hardy was born in Samedan, Switzerland, but represented Canada internationally.
8: Brady Murry was born in Brandon, Manitoba but represented the United States international.
9: Jim Paek was born in South Korea and as a child immigrated to Canada, which he also represented in international play. Paek was the first South Korean to ever play in the NHL.
10: Luc Robitaille served as captain for the first 39 games of the 1992–1993 season while Gretzky was out with an injury.
11: John Tripp was born in Canada, but represents Germany internationally.
