= Peregrine Investments Holdings =

Investment company based in Hong Kong

- Founded: 1988; 38 years ago
- Founder: Francis Leung; Philip Tose
- Defunct: January 1998
- Fate: Bankruptcy
- Subsidiaries: Peregrine Infrastructure Investments Limited; Peregrine Investments Holdings Limited

Peregrine (including Peregrine Investments Holdings Limited and Peregrine Infrastructure Investments Limited) was an investment company based in Hong Kong. It was liquidated following the downturn of the Indonesian economy during the Asian financial crisis, and was acquired by BNP Paribas.

== History ==
=== The Founding of the Company ===
Peregrine was founded in 1988 with an initial investment of $38 million by former race car driver Philip Tose and Francis Leung. They had both worked with Citibank in the past and had a large number of connections to Hong Kong's business elite including Li Ka-shing, Gordon Wu and Larry Yung. The company's goal was to profit from the expanding Asian economy by underwriting stocks and bonds to provide capital for the Asian countries, especially the East Asian Tigers.

=== Culture ===
The company was characterised as "arrogant", and thrived on taking risks. Commenting on their investing during the Tiananmen Square protests of 1989, Leung said, "These events were just a hiccup. We decided we wanted to take advantage of depressed market conditions at the time". In 1994, to create an Asian bond market, they hired Andre Lee from Lehman Brothers to head their fixed income department. Lee, a French Canadian-Korean who grew up within the American military presence in Seoul, was described as a "wild man" and "a salesman who could 'sell snow to the Eskimos.'" By 1996, Lee's operations provided one half of Peregrine's profits. Almost single-handedly, Lee created the Asian junk bond market.

Bill Hwang, the convicted hedge fund manager, was once employed by the company.

=== Financial Collapse ===
In 1998, financial markets were changing. Peregrine underwrote the bond issue by Steady Safe, an Indonesian taxi company of US$265 million, half of Peregrine's capital On the surface, the deal looked secure, although repayment would be in Indonesian rupiah. The deal was undersubscribed, and Peregrine was left with the remaining bonds as the underwriter. Following the collapse of Steady Safe along with several other losses during the Asian financial crisis, the company lost all liquidity and after unsuccessful negotiations with would-be suitors and white knights, and closed in January 1998. The Greater China team stumbled into the arms of BNP Paribas, while a substantial portion of the Asia team (ex-China) was hired by Banco Santander.

== Current operations ==
BNP Paribas Peregrine is now the investment banking arm of BNP Paribas in Asia. It delivers integrated investment banking services covering primary and seconding equity fund raising, underwriting and securities brokerages, corporate finance, financial advisory, mergers and acquisitions. At the end of 2006, BNP announced it was aligning its branding throughout Asia, and the Peregrine name was dropped.
