= Doug Smith (ice hockey) =

Canadian ice hockey player

- Born: May 17, 1963 (age 63) Ottawa, Ontario, Canada
- Height: 6 ft 0 in (183 cm)
- Weight: 180 lb (82 kg; 12 st 12 lb)
- Position: Centre
- Shot: Right
- Played for: Los Angeles Kings; Buffalo Sabres; Edmonton Oilers; Vancouver Canucks; Pittsburgh Penguins
- NHL draft: 2nd overall, 1981; Los Angeles Kings
- Playing career: 1981–1992

Douglas Eric Smith (born May 17, 1963) is a Canadian former professional ice hockey player who played for the Los Angeles Kings, Buffalo Sabres, Edmonton Oilers, Vancouver Canucks and Pittsburgh Penguins over the course of his career. He was selected second overall in the 1981 NHL entry draft.

== Career ==
Smith starred in the Ontario Hockey League as an underage player with his hometown Ottawa 67's and won the league's Bobby Smith Award for Outstanding Academic Achievement in 1981. That same season he scored 45 goals and 101 points in 54 games and was a highly touted draft prospect in the 1981 NHL entry draft, ultimately being selected second overall after future Hall of Famer Dale Hawerchuk.

Smith played in 304 games with the Los Angeles Kings before a January 1986 trade sent him (along with Brian Engblom) to the Buffalo Sabres in exchange for Ken Baumgartner, Sean McKenna and Larry Playfair. In 162 games with the Sabres, Smith recorded 89 points. On October 3, 1988, Smith was claimed in the waiver draft by the Edmonton Oilers, splitting the 1988-89 season between Edmonton and their AHL affiliate, the Cape Breton Oilers.

In March, 1989, Smith was traded with Greg Adams to the Vancouver Canucks in exchange for John LeBlanc and a 1989 fifth-round draft pick (Peter White). Smith played his final NHL game during the 1989–90 season before resuming his career in Europe.

== Injury ==
Smith suffered a career-ending spinal injury in 1992 during a game in the European Elite League. While chasing a puck, Smith crashed headfirst into the end boards at top speed, breaking the fifth and sixth cervical vertebrae and tearing all the ligaments in the back of his neck. The prognosis was life as a quadriplegic, but Smith was able to regain the use of his limbs and teach himself to walk again.

== Post-hockey ==
Following his miraculous recovery, Smith became active in business and founded charitable organizations and fundraising events that have raised millions for various causes. Smith is the founder of Arc Stainless Incorporated and also travels Canada as a motivational speaker.

== Personal ==
He has two sisters, Carey and Tracy.

== Career statistics ==
=== Regular season and playoffs ===
| | | | Regular season | | | | | Playoffs |
| Season | Team | League | GP | G | A | Pts | PIM | GP | G | A | Pts | PIM |
|---|---|---|---|---|---|---|---|---|---|---|---|---|
| 1978–79 | Nepean Raiders | CJHL | 24 | 24 | 17 | 41 | 18 | — | — | — | — | — |
| 1979–80 | Ottawa 67s | OMJHL | 64 | 23 | 34 | 57 | 45 | — | — | — | — | — |
| 1980–81 | Ottawa 67s | OHL | 54 | 45 | 56 | 101 | 61 | — | — | — | — | — |
| 1981–82 | Ottawa 67s | OHL | 1 | 1 | 2 | 3 | 17 | — | — | — | — | — |
| 1981–82 | Los Angeles Kings | NHL | 80 | 16 | 14 | 30 | 64 | 10 | 3 | 2 | 5 | 11 |
| 1982–83 | Los Angeles Kings | NHL | 42 | 11 | 11 | 22 | 12 | — | — | — | — | — |
| 1983–84 | Los Angeles Kings | NHL | 72 | 16 | 20 | 36 | 28 | — | — | — | — | — |
| 1984–85 | Los Angeles Kings | NHL | 62 | 21 | 20 | 41 | 58 | 3 | 1 | 0 | 1 | 4 |
| 1985–86 | Los Angeles Kings | NHL | 48 | 8 | 9 | 17 | 56 | — | — | — | — | — |
| 1985–86 | Buffalo Sabres | NHL | 30 | 10 | 11 | 21 | 73 | — | — | — | — | — |
| 1986–87 | Buffalo Sabres | NHL | 62 | 16 | 24 | 40 | 106 | — | — | — | — | — |
| 1986–87 | Rochester Americans | AHL | 15 | 5 | 6 | 11 | 35 | — | — | — | — | — |
| 1987–88 | Buffalo Sabres | NHL | 70 | 9 | 19 | 28 | 117 | 1 | 0 | 0 | 0 | 0 |
| 1988–89 | Edmonton Oilers | NHL | 19 | 1 | 1 | 2 | 9 | — | — | — | — | — |
| 1988–89 | Cape Breton Oilers | AHL | 24 | 11 | 11 | 22 | 69 | — | — | — | — | — |
| 1988–89 | Vancouver Canucks | NHL | 10 | 3 | 4 | 7 | 4 | 4 | 0 | 0 | 0 | 6 |
| 1989–90 | Vancouver Canucks | NHL | 30 | 3 | 4 | 7 | 72 | — | — | — | — | — |
| 1989–90 | Pittsburgh Penguins | NHL | 10 | 1 | 1 | 2 | 25 | — | — | — | — | — |
| 1990–91 | EC VSV | AUT | 42 | 33 | 36 | 69 | 200 | — | — | — | — | — |
| 1991–92 | VEU Feldkirch | AUT | 30 | 15 | 13 | 28 | 93 | — | — | — | — | — |
| NHL totals | | | 535 | 115 | 138 | 253 | 624 | 18 | 4 | 2 | 6 | 21 |

| Preceded by Jim Fox | Los Angeles Kings first-round draft pick 1981 | Succeeded by Craig Redmond |
