= Dan Gratton =

Canadian ice hockey player (born 1966)

- Born: December 7, 1966 (age 59) Brantford, Ontario, Canada
- Height: 6 ft 1 in (185 cm)
- Weight: 195 lb (88 kg; 13 st 13 lb)
- Position: Centre
- Shot: Left
- Played for: Los Angeles Kings; Innsbrucker EV; AaB Ishockey; Fassa; Slough Jets
- National team: Canada
- NHL draft: 10th overall, 1985; Los Angeles Kings
- Playing career: 1986–1998

Daniel Gratton (born December 7, 1966) is a Canadian former professional ice hockey player. He was drafted by the Los Angeles Kings with the 10th overall pick in the 1985 NHL entry draft. He would go on to play in 7 NHL games with the Kings during the 1987–88 season. He scored his only NHL goal on February 6, 1988, in a 7-2 Kings' win against visiting Edmonton. The rest of his career, which lasted from 1986 to 1998, was spent in the minor leagues and then in European leagues.

== Career statistics ==
=== Regular season and playoffs ===
			Regular season					Playoffs
Season	Team	League	GP	G	A	Pts	PIM	GP	G	A	Pts	PIM
1981–82	Guelph Platers	OJHL	40	14	26	40	70	—	—	—	—	—
1982–83	Oshawa Generals	OHL	64	15	28	43	55	17	6	10	16	11
1982–83	Oshawa Generals	M-Cup	—	—	—	—	—	5	2	0	2	0
1983–84	Oshawa Generals	OHL	63	40	34	74	55	7	2	5	7	15
1984–85	Oshawa Generals	OHL	56	24	48	72	67	5	3	3	6	0
1985–86	Oshawa Generals	OHL	10	5	8	15	—	—	—	—	—
1985–86	Ottawa 67's	OHL	25	18	18	36	19	—	—	—	—	—
1985–86	Belleville Bulls	OHL	20	12	14	26	11	24	20	9	29	16
1986–87	New Haven Nighthawks	AHL	49	6	10	16	45	2	0	0	0	0
1987–88	Los Angeles Kings	NHL	7	1	0	1	5	—	—	—	—	—
1987–88	Binghamton Whalers	AHL	57	18	28	46	77	—	—	—	—	—
1988–89	New Haven Nighthawks	AHL	29	5	13	18	41	—	—	—	—	—
1988–89	Flint Spirits	IHL	20	5	9	14	8	—	—	—	—	—
1989–90	Canadian National Team	Intl	69	29	37	66	40	—	—	—	—	—
1990–91	Canadian National Team	Intl	8	6	2	8	4	—	—	—	—	—
1990–91	Kalamazoo Wings	IHL	44	9	11	20	32	6	1	0	1	14
1991–92	Innsbrucker EV	AUT	8	6	2	8	—	—	—	—	—	—
1991–92	SC Lyss	SWI-2	11	9	5	14	18	—	—	—	—	—
1991–92	Brantford Smoke	CoHL	17	8	12	20	6	6	3	9	12	12
1992–93	AaB Ishockey	DEN	30	28	34	62	68	—	—	—	—	—
1992–93	Brantford Smoke	CoHL	13	9	8	17	0	10	2	11	13	4
1993–94	Hamilton Canucks	AHL	2	0	0	0	12	—	—	—	—	—
1993–94	Brantford Smoke	CoHL	12	9	10	19	16	—	—	—	—	—
1993–94	HC Fassa	ITA	22	18	14	32	22	2	2	0	2	14
1994–95	Slough Jets	BD1	39	84	87	171	142	6	12	11	23	8
1995–96	Slough Jets	BHL	34	36	45	81	118	—	—	—	—	—
1996–97	Muskegon Fury	CoHL	60	14	35	49	36	2	1	0	1	19
1997–98	Muskegon Fury	UHL	4	0	1	1	0	—	—	—	—	—
AHL totals			137	29	51	80	175	2	0	0	0	0
NHL totals			7	1	0	1	5	—	—	—	—	—

=== International ===
Year	Team	Event	GP	G	A	Pts	PIM
1985	Canada	WJC	7	2	3	5	16
Junior totals			7	2	3	5	16

== Coaching career ==
Season	Team	League	Type
1996–97	Muskegon Fury	CoHL	Player-Assistant Coach
1997–98	Muskegon Fury	UHL	Assistant Coach

Preceded by Craig Duncanson	Los Angeles Kings first-round draft pick 1985	Succeeded by Jimmy Carson
