= Craig Duncanson =

Canadian ice hockey player (born 1967)

- Born: March 17, 1967 (age 59) Sudbury, Ontario, Canada
- Height: 6 ft 1 in (185 cm)
- Weight: 200 lb (91 kg; 14 st 4 lb)
- Position: Left wing
- Shot: Left
- Played for: Los Angeles Kings; Winnipeg Jets; New York Rangers
- NHL draft: 9th overall, 1985; Los Angeles Kings
- Playing career: 1986–1997

Craig Duncanson (born March 17, 1967) is a Canadian former professional ice hockey left winger. He was drafted in the first round, ninth overall, by the Los Angeles Kings in the 1985 NHL entry draft. He played 38 games in the National Hockey League (NHL): 28 over five seasons with the Kings, seven with the Winnipeg Jets in the 1990–91 season, and three with the New York Rangers in the 1992–93 season. Duncanson is currently the head coach for the Sudbury Wolves in the Ontario Hockey League.

== Career ==
Duncanson was born in Sudbury, Ontario and raised in Walden, Ontario. He played junior hockey for the Sudbury Wolves in the Ontario Hockey League (OHL), and was drafted by the National Hockey League (NHL) after his second OHL season by the Los Angeles Kings. Duncanson turned professional in 1986 with two games for the King during the 1985–86 season. While in the Kings' organization, Duncanson played mostly for their American Hockey League (AHL) affiliate New Haven Nighthawks with a few callups to the NHL team. He was traded to the Minnesota North Stars by the Kings for Daniel Berthiaume on September 6, 1990, then flipped by Minnesota to the Winnipeg Jets for Brian Hunt. On May 21, 1991, Duncanson was traded again, this time to the Washington Capitals. Duncanson never played for the Capitals and he signed as a free agent with the New York Rangers on September 4, 1992. Duncanson played three seasons for the Rangers' organization, mostly with the Binghamton Rangers. In 1995, Duncanson left the Rangers organization, signing with the Orlando Solar Bears of the International Hockey League (IHL). Duncanson played three seasons in the IHL before retiring.

Duncanson was the head coach of the Voyageurs men's ice hockey team at Laurentian University, reclaiming the role from 1997 to 2000 and again from 2013 to 2021. In 2021, he was hired by his original OHL team, the Sudbury Wolves, as its head coach.

== Career statistics ==
			Regular season					Playoffs
Season	Team	League	GP	G	A	Pts	PIM	GP	G	A	Pts	PIM
1982–83	St. Michael's Buzzers	MetJHL	32	14	19	33	68	—	—	—	—	—
1983–84	Sudbury Wolves	OHL	62	38	38	76	178	—	—	—	—	—
1984–85	Sudbury Wolves	OHL	53	35	28	63	129	—	—	—	—	—
1985–86	Los Angeles Kings	NHL	2	0	1	1	0	—	—	—	—	—
1985–86	Sudbury Wolves	OHL	21	12	17	29	55	—	—	—	—	—
1985–86	Cornwall Royals	OHL	40	31	50	81	135	6	4	7	11	2
1985–86	New Haven Nighthawks	AHL	—	—	—	—	—	2	0	0	0	5
1986–87	Los Angeles Kings	NHL	2	0	0	0	24	—	—	—	—	—
1986–87	Cornwall Royals	OHL	55	22	45	67	88	5	4	3	7	20
1987–88	Los Angeles Kings	NHL	9	0	0	0	12	—	—	—	—	—
1987–88	New Haven Nighthawks	AHL	57	15	25	40	170	—	—	—	—	—
1988–89	Los Angeles Kings	NHL	5	0	0	0	0	—	—	—	—	—
1988–89	New Haven Nighthawks	AHL	69	25	39	64	200	17	4	8	12	60
1989–90	Los Angeles Kings	NHL	10	3	2	5	9	—	—	—	—	—
1989–90	New Haven Nighthawks	AHL	51	17	30	47	152	—	—	—	—	—
1990–91	Winnipeg Jets	NHL	7	2	0	2	16	—	—	—	—	—
1990–91	Moncton Hawks	AHL	58	16	34	50	107	9	3	11	14	31
1991–92	Baltimore Skipjacks	AHL	46	20	26	46	98	—	—	—	—	—
1991–92	Moncton Hawks	AHL	19	12	9	21	6	11	6	4	10	10
1992–93	New York Rangers	NHL	3	0	1	1	0	—	—	—	—	—
1992–93	Binghamton Rangers	AHL	69	35	59	94	126	14	7	5	12	9
1993–94	Binghamton Rangers	AHL	70	25	44	69	83	—	—	—	—	—
1994–95	Binghamton Rangers	AHL	62	21	43	64	105	11	4	4	8	16
1995–96	Orlando Solar Bears	IHL	79	19	24	43	123	22	3	10	13	16
1996–97	Fort Wayne Komets	IHL	61	14	24	38	64	—	—	—	—	—
1996–97	Cincinnati Cyclones	IHL	21	3	11	14	19	3	1	1	2	0
NHL totals			38	5	4	9	61	—	—	—	—	—
AHL totals			501	186	309	495	1047	64	24	32	56	131

Preceded by Craig Redmond	Los Angeles Kings first-round draft pick 1985	Succeeded by Dan Gratton
