= Craig Redmond =

Canadian ice hockey player (born 1965)

- Born: September 22, 1965 (age 60) Dawson Creek, British Columbia, Canada
- Height: 5 ft 10 in (178 cm)
- Weight: 190 lb (86 kg; 13 st 8 lb)
- Position: Defense
- Shot: Left
- Played for: Los Angeles Kings; Edmonton Oilers
- NHL draft: 6th overall, 1984; Los Angeles Kings
- Playing career: 1984–1989; 1995–1996

Craig Sanford Redmond (born September 22, 1965) is a Canadian former professional ice hockey player who played 191 games in the National Hockey League. He played for the Edmonton Oilers and Los Angeles Kings.

== Biography ==
Redmond was born in Dawson Creek, British Columbia. As a youth, he played in the 1978 Quebec International Pee-Wee Hockey Tournament with a minor ice hockey team from the Fraser Valley.

Prior to playing pro hockey, Redmond played junior hockey in the BCJHL, where he finished fourth in scoring as a 16-year old defenseman, setting a record for points by a defenseman. He became an all-WCHA defenceman at the University of Denver as a 17-year-old freshman where he set an all-time school season points record for a defenceman in 1983. He played the following season for the Canadian Olympic Team in 1984..

Redmond was rated as the 4th best prospect by the NHL Central Scouting ratings, and was selected 6th overall in the 1984 NHL draft by the Los Angeles Kings. He signed with Los Angeles and played regularly for two seasons, but a knee injury and inconsistent defensive play led to him being sent to the minors part way through his third season. When he was sent to the minors again in 1987 he refused to report, and was eventually traded to Edmonton. Edmonton also sent him to the minors, and he retired following the season at age 25.

Redmond is a part of the famous Redmond family in hockey, including Mickey Redmond, and Dick Redmond.

== Career statistics ==
=== Regular season and playoffs ===
			Regular season					Playoffs
Season	Team	League	GP	G	A	Pts	PIM	GP	G	A	Pts	PIM
1979–80	Grand Forks Border Bruins	KIJHL	—	—	—	—	—	—	—	—	—	—
1980–81	Abbotsford Flyers	BCHL	40	15	22	37	—	—	—	—	—	—
1981–82	Abbotsford Flyers	BCHL	48	30	76	106	39	—	—	—	—	—
1982–83	University of Denver	WCHA	34	16	38	54	44	—	—	—	—	—
1983–84	Canadian National Team	Intl	62	12	11	23	42	—	—	—	—	—
1984–85	Los Angeles Kings	NHL	79	6	33	39	57	3	1	0	1	2
1985–86	Los Angeles Kings	NHL	73	6	18	24	57	—	—	—	—	—
1986–87	Los Angeles Kings	NHL	16	1	7	8	8	—	—	—	—	—
1986–87	New Haven Nighthawks	AHL	5	2	2	4	8	—	—	—	—	—
1987–88	Los Angeles Kings	NHL	2	0	0	0	0	—	—	—	—	—
1988–89	Denver Rangers	IHL	10	0	13	13	6	—	—	—	—	—
1988–89	Edmonton Oilers	NHL	21	3	10	13	12	—	—	—	—	—
1988–89	Cape Breton Oilers	AHL	44	13	22	35	28	—	—	—	—	—
1995–96	Cape Breton Oilers	AHL	43	2	18	20	80	—	—	—	—	—
1995–96	Atlanta Knights	IHL	25	0	5	5	18	3	0	1	1	0
NHL totals			191	16	68	84	134	3	1	0	1	2

=== International ===
Year	Team	Event	GP	G	A	Pts	PIM
1984	Canada	OG	7	2	0	2	4
1986	Canada	WC	10	3	2	5	16
Senior totals			17	5	2	7	20

Awards and achievements
Preceded by James Patrick	WCHA Freshman of the Year; 1982–83	Succeeded by Rick Kosti
Sporting positions
Preceded by Doug Smith	Los Angeles Kings first-round draft pick 1984	Succeeded by Craig Duncanson
