= Andre Lee =

- Born: January 16, 1963 (age 63); New York City, New York, United States
- Education: Bachelor of Arts (1985)
- Alma mater: Colgate University
- Occupations: Chief executive officer; Entrepreneur; Financier
- Known for: Creating the Asian bond market and co-founding the first invention capital private equity fund.

Andre Lee (born January 16, 1963) is a French-Canadian-Korean executive, entrepreneur and financier from New York City, New York. He is the chief executive officer of Snowflake Innovations and Technology Reserve. He formerly served as co-founder and managing director of the Invention Development Fund at Intellectual Ventures. Lee is best known for "largely pioneering the Asian junk bonds market" as the head of Peregrine's bond department. In 2011, Lee founded Snowflake Innovations, a private holding company focused on designing and spinning out new business models and strategic platforms in financing intangible assets. He blogs on a range of subjects related to innovation at Innovation Unleashed.

== Early life ==
Andre Lee was born in New York City to a French-Canadian mother and Korean father. When he was five years old, Lee moved to South Korea with his family, where he stayed until he returned to New York to attend Colgate University in 1981. He studied philosophy and religion and earned his Bachelor of Arts from Colgate in 1985. After graduation, Lee was hired by Juki, a Japanese company that manufactured industrial sewing machines, and was responsible for managing distributors in the garment industry in New York City.

== Career ==
In 1988, Lee became a retail-broker trainee on Wall Street at Shearson Lehman Hutton Inc., which later became Salomon Smith Barney. Lee built relationships and established contacts in Korea and began to establish business with Korean banks. Because of his early success, Lee went to work for Lehman Brothers in their Hong Kong office, where he became a "leading" bond salesman. In Hong Kong, Lee worked as a fixed-income salesman covering Asian fixed-income institutional investors in Hong Kong and Korea. Lee began selling bonds to Korean banks and managed Lehman's fixed income trading relationship with the central bank of Korea and the Asian Development Bank.

In 1994, "with a reputation for being at the cutting edge of financial developments in Asia," Lee left Lehman Brothers to head Peregrine's fixed-income business. From 1994–1996, Peregrine's business increased six-fold under Lee's leadership. In 1996, Lee's team accounted for one-third of Peregrine's operating profits.

Peregrine went into liquidation in January 1998 as a result of the 1997 Asian financial crisis. and Lee returned to Korea to found 01 Inc., an internet-based company that provided internet-enabled financial trading and investment banking services for small businesses and financial institutions. 01 Inc. was backed by Hyundai Development Company and Kolon. 01 Inc.'s DealComposer.com, a website designed to guide companies through funding processes, including regulatory and due diligence, launched in August 2000.

Lee later co-founded and served as managing director of Intellectual Ventures' Invention Development Fund, an approximately $590 million fund focused on generating invention and encouraging technology transfer that partnered with universities and individual inventors in Asia and North America. He left the firm in 2011. Lee currently serves as CEO of Snowflake Innovations and Technology Reserve both based in Vancouver, British Columbia, Canada. Snowflake Innovations is a private holding company focused on designing and spinning out new business models and strategic platforms in financing intangible assets. Technology Reserve is a global exchange platform for sharing technology and know-how designed to accelerate innovation in small and medium-sized companies.
