= List of Los Angeles Kings records =

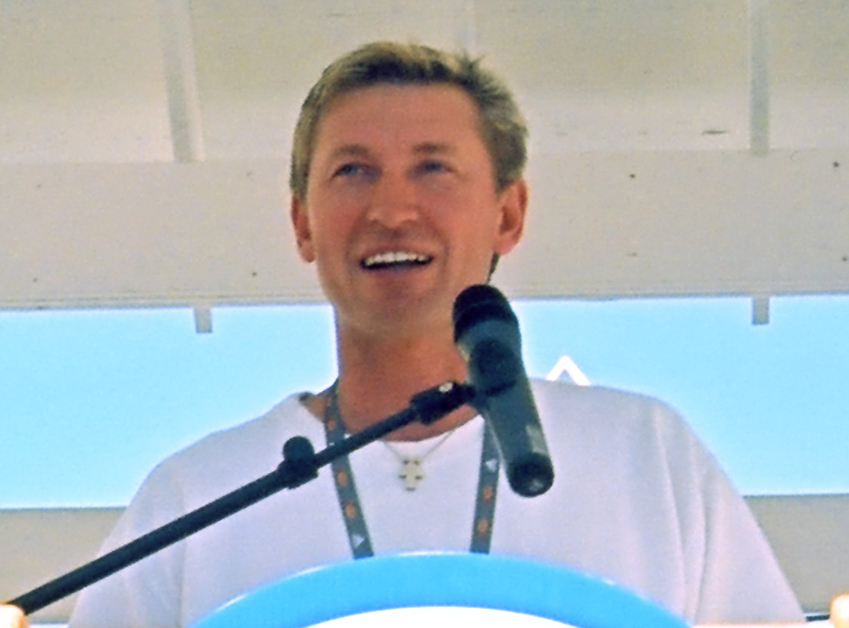
Wayne Gretzky is the Kings' all-time leader in single season assists and points and career playoff assists and points.

This is a list of franchise records for the Los Angeles Kings of the National Hockey League (updated through January 13, 2024).

== Career regular season leaders ==
=== Skaters ===
Games played
#	Player	GP	Seasons
1	Anze Kopitar	1,331	2006–present
2	Dustin Brown	1,296	2003–2022
3	Drew Doughty	1,134	2008–present
4	Dave Taylor	1,111	1977–1994
5	Luc Robitaille	1,077	1986–2006
Active leader
1	Anze Kopitar	1,331	2006–present

Goals
#	Player	G	Seasons
1	Luc Robitaille	557	1986–2006
2	Marcel Dionne	550	1975–1987
3	Dave Taylor	431	1977–1994
4	Anze Kopitar	407	2006–present
5	Bernie Nicholls	327	1981–1990
Active leader
4	Anze Kopitar	407	2006–present

Assists
#	Player	A	Seasons
1	Anze Kopitar	773	2006–present
2	Marcel Dionne	757	1975–1987
3	Wayne Gretzky	672	1988–1996
4	Dave Taylor	638	1977–1994
5	Luc Robitaille	597	1986–2006
Active leader
1	Anze Kopitar	773	2006–present

Points
#	Player	Pts	Seasons
1	Marcel Dionne	1,307	1975–1987
2	Anze Kopitar	1,180	2006–present
3	Luc Robitaille	1,154	1986–2006
4	Dave Taylor	1,069	1977–1994
5	Wayne Gretzky	918	1988–1996
Active leader
2	Anze Kopitar	1,180	2006–present

Penalties in minutes
#	Player	PIM	Seasons
1	Marty McSorley	1,846	1988–1996
2	Dave Taylor	1,589	1977–1994
3	Jay Wells	1,446	1979–1988
4	Rob Blake	1,231	1989–2008
5	Ian Laperriere	1,017	1995–2004
Active leader
13	Drew Doughty	753	2008–present

Power play goals
#	Player	PPG	Seasons
1	Luc Robitaille	210	1986–2006
2	Marcel Dionne	172	1975–1987
3	Dave Taylor	123	1977–1994
4	Anze Kopitar	117	2006–present
5	Dustin Brown	106	2003–2022
Active leader
4	Anze Kopitar	117	2006–present

Shorthanded goals
#	Player	SHG	Seasons
1	Bernie Nicholls	25	1982–1990
2	Robert Goring	19	1969–1980
2	Mike Murphy	19	1973–1983
4	Wayne Gretzky	17	1989–1996
5	Anze Kopitar	13	2006–present
Active leader
5	Anze Kopitar	13	2006–present

Game winning goals
#	Player	GWG	Seasons
1	Luc Robitaille	73	1986–2006
2	Anze Kopitar	68	2006–present
3	Marcel Dionne	59	1975–1987
4	Dave Taylor	47	1977–1994
5	Jeff Carter	44	2012–2021
Active leader
2	Anze Kopitar	68	2006–present

^{†} Game tying goals
#	Player	GTG	Seasons
1	Luc Robitaille	8	1986–2006
1	Wayne Gretzky	8	1988–1996
3	4 tied	4	--
Active leader
N/A	--	--	--

Overtime game winning goals
#	Player	OTG	Seasons
1	Jeff Carter	11	2012–2021
2	Dustin Brown	9	2003–2022
2	Anze Kopitar	9	2006–present
4	Drew Doughty	8	2008–present
5	Tanner Pearson	6	2011–2018
Active leader
2	Anze Kopitar	9	2006–present

Highest +/-
#	Player	+	Seasons
1	Dave Taylor	186	1977–1994
2	Marcel Dionne	105	1975–1987
3	Anze Kopitar	98	2006–present
4	Zigmund Palffy	85	1999–2004
5	Charlie Simmer	84	1977–1985
Active leader
3	Anze Kopitar	98	2006–present

=== Goaltenders ===
Games played
#	Player	GP	Seasons
1	Jonathan Quick	743	2007–2022
2	Rogie Vachon	389	1979–1985
3	Kelly Hrudey	360	1989–1995
4	Mario Lessard	240	1984–1990
5	Jamie Storr	205	1984–1988
Active leader
31	Pheonix Copley	45	2022–present

Wins
#	Player	W	Seasons
1	Jonathan Quick	370	2007–2022
2	Rogie Vachon	171	1971–1978
3	Kelly Hrudey	145	1988–1996
4	Mario Lessard	92	1978–1984
5	Jamie Storr	85	1994–2003
Active leader
16	Pheonix Copley	28	2022–present

Losses
#	Player	L	Seasons
1	Jonathan Quick	275	2007–2022
2	Rogie Vachon	148	1971–1978
3	Kelly Hrudey	135	1988–1996
4	Mario Lessard	97	1978–1984
5	Stephane Fiset	85	1996–2001
Active leader
39	Cam Talbot	10	2023–present

^{†} Ties
#	Player	T	Seasons
1	Rogie Vachon	66	1971–1978
2	Kelly Hrudey	55	1988–1996
3	Mario Lessard	39	1978–1984
4	Stephane Fiset	22	1996–2001
4	Gary Edwards	22	1971–1997
Active leader
N/A	--	--	--

^{†} Overtime/shootout losses
#	Player	OTL	Seasons
1	Jonathan Quick	82	2007–present
2	Erik Ersberg	10	2007–2010
2	Cal Petersen	10	2017–present
4	Mathieu Garon	9	2005–2007
5	Jason LaBarbera	8	2005–2009
Active leader
7	Pheonix Copley	5	2022–present
7	Cam Talbot	5	2023–present

Goals against average
#	Player	GAA	Seasons
1	Peter Budaj	2.22	2015–2017, 2018
2	Felix Potvin	2.35	2000–2003
3	Jonathan Bernier	2.36	2007–2013
4	Cristobal Huet	2.41	2002–2004
5	Jonathan Quick	2.46	2007–2022
Active leader
N/A	--	--	--

- Minimum 50 games

Save percentage
#	Player	SV%	Seasons
1	Jack Campbell	.918	2016–2020
2	Peter Budaj	.913	2015–2017, 2018
3	Jonathan Bernier	.912	2002–2012
4	Jonathan Quick	.911	2007–2022
5	Erik Ersberg	.910	2008–2010
5	Jamie Storr	.910	1994–2003
Active leader
N/A	--	--	--

- Minimum 50 games

Shutouts
#	Player	SO	Seasons
1	Jonathan Quick	57	2007–2022
2	Rogie Vachon	32	1971–1978
3	Jamie Storr	16	1994–2003
4	Felix Potvin	14	2000–2003
5	Stephane Fiset	10	1996–2001
5	Kelly Hrudey	10	1988–1996
Active leader
21	Pheonix Copley	2	2022–present
21	Cam Talbot	2	2023–present

== Single season records ==
=== Skaters ===
Goals
#	Player	G	Season
1	Bernie Nicholls	70	1988–89
2	Luc Robitaille	63	1992–93
3	Marcel Dionne	59	1978–79
4	Marcel Dionne	58	1980–81
5	Marcel Dionne	56	1982–83
5	Charlie Simmer	56	1980–81
5	Charlie Simmer	56	1979–80

Assists
#	Player	A	Season
1	Wayne Gretzky	122	1990–91
2	Wayne Gretzky	114	1988–89
3	Wayne Gretzky	102	1989–90
4	Wayne Gretzky	92	1993–94
5	Wayne Gretzky	90	1991–92

Points
#	Player	Pts	Season
1	Wayne Gretzky	168	1988–89
2	Wayne Gretzky	163	1990–91
3	Bernie Nicholls	150	1988–89
4	Wayne Gretzky	142	1989–90
5	Marcel Dionne	137	1979–80

Penalties in minutes
#	Player	PIM	Season
1	Marty McSorley	399	1992–93
2	Tiger Williams	358	1986–87
3	Marty McSorley	350	1988–89
4	Marty McSorley	322	1989–90
4	Warren Rychel	322	1993–94

=== Goaltenders ===
Wins
#	Player	W	Season
1	Jonathan Quick	40	2015–16
2	Jonathan Quick	39	2009–10
3	Jonathan Quick	36	2014–15
4	Mario Lessard	35	1980–81
4	Jonathan Quick	35	2011–12
4	Jonathan Quick	35	2010–11
5	Rogie Vachon	33	1976–77
5	Jonathan Quick	33	2017–18

== Career playoff leaders ==
=== Skaters ===
Games played
#	Player	GP	Seasons
1	Luc Robitaille	94	1986–2001
2	Dave Taylor	92	1977–1993
3	Dustin Brown	85	2009–present
4	Drew Doughty	84	2009–present
5	Anze Kopitar	79	2009–present
5	Trevor Lewis	79	2009–present
Active leader
3	Dustin Brown	85	2009–present

Goals
#	Player	G	Seasons
1	Luc Robitaille	41	1986–2001
2	Wayne Gretzky	29	1988–1993
3	Dave Taylor	26	1977–1993
3	Jeff Carter	26	2011–present
5	Justin Williams	22	2009–2014
Active leader
5	Jeff Carter	26	2011–present

Assists
#	Player	A	Seasons
1	Wayne Gretzky	65	1988–1993
2	Luc Robitaille	48	1986–2001
3	Anze Kopitar	45	2009–present
4	Drew Doughty	35	2009–present
5	Dave Taylor	33	1977–1993
Active leader
3	Anze Kopitar	45	2009–present

Points
#	Player	Pts	Seasons
1	Wayne Gretzky	94	1988–1993
2	Luc Robitaille	89	1986–2001
3	Anze Kopitar	66	2009–present
4	Dave Taylor	59	1977–1993
5	Justin Williams	54	2009–2014
Active leader
3	Anze Kopitar	66	2009–present

Penalties in minutes
#	Player	PIM	Seasons
1	Marty McSorley	190	1988–1993
2	Dave Taylor	149	1977–1993
3	Luc Robitaille	126	1986–2001
4	Jay Wells	110	1979–1988
5	Jay Miller	102	1988–1992
Active leader
8	Dustin Brown	84	2009–present

Power play goals
#	Player	PPG	Seasons
1	Luc Robitaille	14	1986–2001
2	Dave Taylor	10	1977–1993
2	Marcel Dionne	10	1975–1985
2	Jeff Carter	10	2011–present
5	Wayne Gretzky	8	1988–1993
Active leader
2	Jeff Carter	10	2011–present

Shorthanded goals
#	Player	SHG	Seasons
T-1	Dustin Brown	2	2009–present
T-1	Wayne Gretzky	2	1988–1993
T-1	Anze Kopitar	2	2009–present
T-1	Jari Kurri	2	1991–1993
T-1	Dave Taylor	2	1977–1993
Active leader
T-1	Dustin Brown	2	2009–present
T-1	Anze Kopitar	2	2009–present

Game winning goals
#	Player	GWG	Seasons
1	Luc Robitaille	9	1986–2001
2	Dustin Brown	5	2009–present
2	Wayne Gretzky	5	1988–1993
4	6 Tied	4	--
Active leader
2	Dustin Brown	5	2009–present

=== Goaltenders ===
Games played
#	Player	GP	Seasons
1	Jonathan Quick	85	2009–present
2	Kelly Hrudey	57	1988–1993
3	Rogie Vachon	25	1973–1978
4	Felix Potvin	20	2000–2002
4	Mario Lessard	20	1978–1982
Active leader
1	Jonathan Quick	85	2009–present

Wins
#	Player	W	Seasons
1	Jonathan Quick	46	2009–present
2	Kelly Hrudey	26	1988–1993
3	Felix Potvin	10	2000–2002
4	Rogie Vachon	9	1973–1978
5	Mario Lessard	6	1978–1982
Active leader
1	Jonathan Quick	46	2009–present

Losses
#	Player	L	Seasons
1	Jonathan Quick	39	2009–present
2	Kelly Hrudey	30	1988–1993
3	Rogie Vachon	16	1973–1978
4	Mario Lessard	12	1978–1982
5	Felix Potvin	10	2000–2002
Active leader
1	Jonathan Quick	39	2009–present

Goals against average
#	Player	GAA	Seasons
1	Jonathan Quick	2.23	2009–present
2	Felix Potvin	2.34	2000–2002
3	Rogie Vachon	3.09	1973–1978
4	Kelly Hrudey	3.53	1988–1993
5	Mario Lessard	4.38	1978–1982
Active leader
1	Jonathan Quick	2.23	2009–present

- Minimum 10 games

Save percentage
#	Player	SV%	Seasons
1	Jonathan Quick	.923	2009–present
2	Felix Potvin	.915	2000–2002
3	Stephane Fiset	.893	1997–2001
4	Kelly Hrudey	.883	1988–1993
5	Glenn Healy	.860	1987–1989
Active leader
1	Jonathan Quick	.923	2009–present

- Minimum 7 games

Shutouts
#	Player	SO	Seasons
1	Jonathan Quick	9	2009–present
2	Felix Potvin	3	2000–2002
3	Terry Sawchuk	1	1967–1968
3	Rogie Vachon	1	1973–1978
5	20 Tied	0	--
Active leader
1	Jonathan Quick	9	2009–present

== Notes ==
^{†}: Beginning in the 2005–06 season, ties are no longer possible. At the same time, the League began tracking overtime losses for goaltenders.

Active Kings players are in Bold.

== See also ==
- List of Los Angeles Kings players
- List of Los Angeles Kings seasons
