= 2009–10 Los Angeles Kings season =

National Hockey League team season

2009–10 Los Angeles Kings
- Division: 3rd Pacific
- Conference: 6th Western
- 2009–10 record: 46–27–9
- Home record: 22–13–6
- Road record: 24–14–3
- Goals for: 241
- Goals against: 219

Team information
- General manager: Dean Lombardi
- Coach: Terry Murray
- Captain: Dustin Brown
- Alternate captains: Matt Greene; Anze Kopitar
- Arena: Staples Center

The 2009–10 Los Angeles Kings season was the team's 43rd season (42nd season of play) in the National Hockey League (NHL). For the first time since the 2001–02 NHL season, the Kings qualified for the Stanley Cup playoffs.

== Preseason ==
The Kings were busy at the 2009 NHL entry draft, making five trades. The Kings chose Brayden Schenn as their first-round pick, fifth overall. The Kings finished the pre-season with a record of 4–3–1. Defenseman Sean O'Donnell received a five-game suspension during the preseason after an incident involving New York Islanders forward Matt Martin. O'Donnell missed the final three pre-season games, and will miss the first two games of the regular season.

2009 Pre-season game log: 4–3–1 (Home: 2–0–0; Road: 0–3–0; Neutral: 2–0–1)
#	Date	Visitor	Score	Home	OT	Decision	Attendance	Record	Recap
1	September 15	Phoenix Coyotes	Won 4–3	Los Angeles Kings		Jonathan Bernier (1–0–0)	8,432	1–0–0
2	September 15	Los Angeles Kings	Lost 4–2	Phoenix Coyotes		Erik Ersberg (0–1–0)	4,643	1–1–0
3	September 17 (in Ontario, CA)	San Jose Sharks	Lost 2–1	Los Angeles Kings	SO	Jonathan Quick (0–0–1)	6,245	1–1–1
4	September 19	Anaheim Ducks	Won 4–1	Los Angeles Kings		Jonathan Bernier (2–0–0)	11,995	2–1–1
5	September 22 (in Kansas City, MO)	Los Angeles Kings	Won 4–2	New York Islanders		Jonathan Quick (1–0–1)	9,792	3–1–1
6	September 23	Los Angeles Kings	Lost 3–2	Colorado Avalanche		Erik Ersberg (0–2–0)		3–2–1
7	September 26 (in Las Vegas, NV)	Colorado Avalanche	Won 5–3	Los Angeles Kings		Jonathan Quick (2–0–1)	11,263	4–2–1
8	September 27	Los Angeles Kings	Lost 5–4	Anaheim Ducks		Jonathan Bernier (2–1–0)	15,677	4–3–1

Luc Robitaille was inducted into the Hockey Hall of Fame on November 9, 2009. Robitaille, who currently serves as the President of Business Operations for the Kings, was joined by Brian Leetch, Steve Yzerman, Brett Hull and Lou Lamoriello in this year's class of inductees.

== Regular season ==
The Kings observed a 17-day break in the schedule in February due to the 2010 Winter Olympics. Five players currently under contract for Los Angeles were selected to represent their countries during the tournament. Drew Doughty played for Canada, Michal Handzus played for Slovakia, while Dustin Brown, Jack Johnson and Jonathan Quick all represented the United States.

The main highlights for the club included them breaking an eight-year playoff absence by qualifying as the sixth seed in the Western Conference. They finished the season with 101 points, the third highest point total in franchise history. They also set a franchise record with a nine-game winning streak from January 21 through February 6. They registered two other eight game stretches without a loss. On the road, they established franchise records for road wins in a season (24), road points (51) and the first ever 5–0–0 record on a five-game trip in franchise history.

Individually, goaltender Jonathan Quick established single-season records for victories with 39 and games played with 72.

=== Divisional standings ===
Pacific Division
		GP	W	L	OTL	GF	GA	Pts
**1**	**z – San Jose Sharks**	**82**	**51**	**20**	**11**	**264**	**215**	**113**
**2**	**Phoenix Coyotes**	**82**	**50**	**25**	**7**	**225**	**202**	**107**
**3**	**Los Angeles Kings**	**82**	**46**	**27**	**9**	**241**	**219**	**101**
4	Anaheim Ducks	82	39	32	11	238	251	89
5	Dallas Stars	82	37	31	14	237	254	88

=== Conference standings ===
Western Conference
R		Div	GP	W	L	OTL	GF	GA	Pts
**1**	**z – San Jose Sharks**	**PA**	**82**	**51**	**20**	**11**	**264**	**215**	113
**2**	**y – Chicago Blackhawks**	**CE**	**82**	**52**	**22**	**8**	**271**	**209**	112
**3**	**y – Vancouver Canucks**	**NW**	**82**	**49**	**28**	**5**	**272**	**222**	103
**4**	**Phoenix Coyotes**	**PA**	**82**	**50**	**25**	**7**	**225**	**202**	107
**5**	**Detroit Red Wings**	**CE**	**82**	**44**	**24**	**14**	**229**	**216**	102
**6**	**Los Angeles Kings**	**PA**	**82**	**46**	**27**	**9**	**241**	**219**	101
**7**	**Nashville Predators**	**CE**	**82**	**47**	**29**	**6**	**225**	**225**	100
**8**	**Colorado Avalanche**	**NW**	**82**	**43**	**30**	**9**	**244**	**233**	95
8.5
9	Calgary Flames	NW	82	40	32	10	225	223	90
10	St. Louis Blues	CE	82	40	32	10	204	210	90
11	Anaheim Ducks	PA	82	39	32	11	238	251	89
12	Dallas Stars	PA	82	37	31	14	237	254	88
13	Minnesota Wild	NW	82	38	36	8	219	246	84
14	Columbus Blue Jackets	CE	82	32	35	15	216	259	79
15	Edmonton Oilers	NW	82	27	47	8	214	284	62

bold – Qualified for playoffs; y – Won division; z – Won conference (and division)

== Schedule and results ==
2009–10 game log

October: 8–4–2 (Home: 4–1–1; Road: 4–3–1)
#	Date	Visitor	Score	Home	OT	Decision	Attendance	Record	Pts	Recap
1	October 3	Phoenix Coyotes	Lost 6–3	Los Angeles Kings		Quick (0–1–0)	18,118	0–1–0	0
2	October 6	San Jose Sharks	Won 6–4	Los Angeles Kings		Quick (1–1–0)	15,053	1–1–0	2
3	October 8	Minnesota Wild	Won 6–3	Los Angeles Kings		Quick (2–1–0)	14,995	2–1–0	4
4	October 10	Los Angeles Kings	Won 2–1	St. Louis Blues		Quick (3–1–0)	19,150	3–1–0	6
5	October 12	Los Angeles Kings	Won 2–1	New York Islanders		Quick (4–1–0)	12,145	4–1–0	8
6	October 14	Los Angeles Kings	Lost 4–2	New York Rangers		Ersberg (0–1–0)	18,200	4–2–0	8
7	October 15	Los Angeles Kings	Lost 5–2	Detroit Red Wings		Quick (4–2–0)	17,782	4–3–0	8
8	October 17	Los Angeles Kings	Lost 4–1	Columbus Blue Jackets		Quick (4–3–0)	15,251	4–4–0	8
9	October 19	Los Angeles Kings	Won 4–1	Dallas Stars		Quick (5–3–0)	16,210	5–4–0	10
10	October 22	Dallas Stars	Won 5–4	Los Angeles Kings	OT	Quick (6–3–0)	15,025	6–4–0	12
11	October 24	Los Angeles Kings	Won 5–3	Phoenix Coyotes		Quick (7–3–0)	7,968	7–4–0	14
12	October 25	Columbus Blue Jackets	Won 6–2	Los Angeles Kings		Quick (8–3–0)	15,820	8–4–0	16
13	October 28	Los Angeles Kings	Lost 2–1	San Jose Sharks	SO	Quick (8–3–1)	17,562	8–4–1	17
14	October 29	Vancouver Canucks	Lost 2–1	Los Angeles Kings	SO	Quick (8–3–2)	16,838	8–4–2	18

November: 7–6–0 (Home: 2–3–0; Road: 5–3–0)
#	Date	Visitor	Score	Home	OT	Decision	Attendance	Record	Pts	Recap
15	November 2	Los Angeles Kings	Won 5–3	Phoenix Coyotes		Quick (9–3–2)	5,855	9–4–2	20
16	November 5	Pittsburgh Penguins	Won 5–2	Los Angeles Kings		Quick (10–3–2)	18,118	10–4–2	22
17	November 7	Nashville Predators	Lost 3–1	Los Angeles Kings		Quick (10–4–2)	15,237	10–5–2	22
18	November 9	Los Angeles Kings	Lost 4–1	Chicago Blackhawks		Quick (10–5–2)	20,293	10–6–2	22
19	November 11	Los Angeles Kings	Won 5–2	Carolina Hurricanes		Ersberg (1–1–0)	13,510	11–6–2	24
20	November 13	Los Angeles Kings	Lost 7–0	Atlanta Thrashers		Quick (10–6–2)	15,638	11–7–2	24
21	November 14	Los Angeles Kings	Won 2–1	Tampa Bay Lightning	SO	Quick (11–6–2)	16,612	12–7–2	26
22	November 16	Los Angeles Kings	Won 4–3	Florida Panthers	SO	Quick (12–6–2)	12,502	13–7–2	28
23	November 18	Philadelphia Flyers	Lost 3–2	Los Angeles Kings		Quick (12–7–2)	17,821	13–8–2	28
24	November 21	Calgary Flames	Lost 5–2	Los Angeles Kings		Quick (12–8–2)	16,336	13–9–2	28
25	November 25	Los Angeles Kings	Won 3–1	Edmonton Oilers		Quick (13–8–2)	16,839	14–9–2	30
26	November 26	Los Angeles Kings	Lost 4–1	Vancouver Canucks		Quick (13–9–2)	18,810	14–10–2	30
27	November 28	Chicago Blackhawks	Won 2–1	Los Angeles Kings	SO	Quick (14–9–2)	18,118	15–10–2	32

December: 8–5–1 (Home: 4–1–1; Road: 4–4–0)
#	Date	Visitor	Score	Home	OT	Decision	Attendance	Record	Pts	Recap
28	December 1	Los Angeles Kings	Won 4–3	Anaheim Ducks		Quick (15–9–2)	14,231	16–10–2	34
29	December 3	Ottawa Senators	Won 6–3	Los Angeles Kings		Quick (16–9–2)	14,997	17–10–2	36
30	December 5	St. Louis Blues	Lost 5–4	Los Angeles Kings	SO	Quick (16–9–3)	17,519	17–10–3	37
31	December 7	Calgary Flames	Won 2–1	Los Angeles Kings		Quick (17–9–3)	13,853	18–10–3	39
32	December 9	Los Angeles Kings	Won 5–4	San Jose Sharks	OT	Ersberg (2–1–0)	17,562	19–10–3	41
33	December 10	Phoenix Coyotes	Won 3–2	Los Angeles Kings	SO	Quick (18–9–3)	15,259	20–10–3	43
34	December 12	Dallas Stars	Won 3–2	Los Angeles Kings	SO	Quick (19–9–3)	18,118	21–10–3	45
35	December 14	Los Angeles Kings	Lost 3–1	Vancouver Canucks		Quick (19–10–3)	18,810	21–11–3	45
36	December 15	Los Angeles Kings	Won 3–2	Edmonton Oilers		Quick (20–10–3)	16,839	22–11–3	47
37	December 17	Los Angeles Kings	Lost 2–1	Calgary Flames		Quick (20–11–3)	19,289	22–12–3	47
38	December 26	Los Angeles Kings	Lost 3–2	Phoenix Coyotes		Quick (20–12–3)	16,131	22–13–3	47
39	December 28	Minnesota Wild	Lost 4–3	Los Angeles Kings		Quick (20–13–3)	18,118	22–14–3	47
40	December 30	Los Angeles Kings	Lost 2–1	Calgary Flames		Ersberg (2–2–0)	19,289	22–15–3	47
41	December 31	Los Angeles Kings	Won 5–2	Minnesota Wild		Quick (21–13–3)	18,504	23–15–3	49

January: 10–4–0 (Home: 4–4–0; Road: 6–0–0)
#	Date	Visitor	Score	Home	OT	Decision	Attendance	Record	Pts	Recap
42	January 2	Washington Capitals	Won 2–1	Los Angeles Kings		Quick (22–13–3)	18,118	24–15–3	51
43	January 4	Los Angeles Kings	Won 6–2	San Jose Sharks		Quick (23–13–3)	17,562	25–15–3	53
44	January 7	Detroit Red Wings	Lost 2–1	Los Angeles Kings		Quick (23–14–3)	18,118	25–16–3	53
45	January 9	St. Louis Blues	Lost 4–3	Los Angeles Kings		Quick (23–15–3)	18,118	25–17–3	53
46	January 11	San Jose Sharks	Lost 2–1	Los Angeles Kings		Ersberg (2–3–0)	17,821	25–18–3	53
47	January 14	Anaheim Ducks	Won 4–0	Los Angeles Kings		Quick (24–15–3)	18,118	26–18–3	55
48	January 16	Boston Bruins	Won 4–3	Los Angeles Kings	SO	Quick (25–15–3)	18,118	27–18–3	57
49	January 19	San Jose Sharks	Lost 5–1	Los Angeles Kings		Quick (25–16–3)	16,212	27–19–3	57
50	January 21	Buffalo Sabres	Won 4–3	Los Angeles Kings	SO	Quick (26–16–3)	16,884	28–19–3	59
51	January 23	Los Angeles Kings	Won 3–2	Detroit Red Wings		Quick (27–16–3)	20,066	29–19–3	61
52	January 26	Los Angeles Kings	Won 5–3	Toronto Maple Leafs		Quick (28–16–3)	19,322	30–19–3	63
53	January 28	Los Angeles Kings	Won 4–1	Columbus Blue Jackets		Quick (29–16–3)	13,709	31–19–3	65
54	January 30	Los Angeles Kings	Won 3–2	Boston Bruins	SO	Quick (30–16–3)	17,565	32–19–3	67
55	January 31	Los Angeles Kings	Won 3–2	New Jersey Devils		Quick (31–16–3)	17,625	33–19–3	69

February: 4–1–1 (Home: 4–0–1; Road: 0–1–0)
#	Date	Visitor	Score	Home	OT	Decision	Attendance	Record	Pts	Recap
56	February 2	New York Rangers	Won 2–1	Los Angeles Kings		Quick (32–16–3)	18,118	34–19–3	71
57	February 4	Anaheim Ducks	Won 6–4	Los Angeles Kings		Quick (33–16–3)	18,118	35–19–3	73
58	February 6	Detroit Red Wings	Won 4–3	Los Angeles Kings		Quick (34–16–3)	18,118	36–19–3	75
59	February 8	Los Angeles Kings	Lost 4–2	Anaheim Ducks		Quick (34–17–3)	16,033	36–20–3	75
60	February 11	Edmonton Oilers	Lost 3–2	Los Angeles Kings	SO	Ersberg (2–3–1)	18,118	36–20–4	76
61	February 13	Colorado Avalanche	Won 3–0	Los Angeles Kings		Quick (35–17–3)	18,118	37–20–4	78

March: 6–7–2 (Home: 3–4–0; Road: 3–3–2)
#	Date	Visitor	Score	Home	OT	Decision	Attendance	Record	Pts	Recap
62	March 2	Los Angeles Kings	Won 5–1	Dallas Stars		Quick (36–17–3)	15,571	38–20–4	80
63	March 4	Los Angeles Kings	Lost 4–2	Nashville Predators		Quick (36–18–3)	15,653	38–21–4	80
64	March 6	Montreal Canadiens	Lost 4–2	Los Angeles Kings		Quick (36–19–3)	18,118	38–22–4	80
65	March 8	Columbus Blue Jackets	Won 6–0	Los Angeles Kings		Quick (37–19–3)	17,524	39–22–4	82
66	March 10	Los Angeles Kings	Lost 3–2	Chicago Blackhawks	OT	Quick (37–19–4)	21,850	39–22–5	83
67	March 12	Los Angeles Kings	Won 2–1	Dallas Stars	SO	Bernier (1–0–0)	16,651	40–22–5	85
68	March 14	Nashville Predators	Lost 3–2	Los Angeles Kings		Quick (37–20–4)	18,118	40–23–5	85
69	March 18	Chicago Blackhawks	Lost 3–0	Los Angeles Kings		Quick (37–21–4)	18,118	40–24–5	85
70	March 20	New York Islanders	Won 1–0	Los Angeles Kings		Quick (38–21–4)	18,118	41–24–5	87
71	March 22	Colorado Avalanche	Won 4–3	Los Angeles Kings	OT	Quick (39–21–4)	17,845	42–24–5	89
72	March 24	Los Angeles Kings	Lost 4–3	Colorado Avalanche	SO	Ersberg (2–3–2)	13,667	42–24–6	90
73	March 25	Los Angeles Kings	Lost 3–1	St. Louis Blues		Quick (39–22–4)	19,150	42–25–6	90
74	March 27	Dallas Stars	Lost 4–1	Los Angeles Kings		Quick (39–23–4)	18,118	42–26–6	90
75	March 29	Los Angeles Kings	Lost 3–2	Minnesota Wild		Quick (39–24–4)	18,284	42–27–6	90
76	March 30	Los Angeles Kings	Won 2–0	Nashville Predators		Bernier (2–0–0)	14,433	43–27–6	92

April: 3–0–3 (Home: 1–0–3; Road: 2–0–0)
#	Date	Visitor	Score	Home	OT	Decision	Attendance	Record	Pts	Recap
77	April 1	Vancouver Canucks	Won 8–3	Los Angeles Kings		Bernier (3–0–0)	18,118	44–27–6	94
78	April 3	Anaheim Ducks	Lost 2–1	Los Angeles Kings	SO	Quick (39–24–5)	18,118	44–27–7	95
79	April 6	Los Angeles Kings	Won 5–4	Anaheim Ducks	SO	Ersberg (3–3–2)	16,278	45–27–7	97
80	April 8	Phoenix Coyotes	Lost 3–2	Los Angeles Kings	SO	Quick (39–24–6)	18,118	45–27–8	98
81	April 10	Edmonton Oilers	Lost 4–3	Los Angeles Kings	SO	Quick (39–24–7)	18,118	45–27–9	99
82	April 11	Los Angeles Kings	Won 2–1	Colorado Avalanche	OT	Ersberg (4–3–2)	15,674	46–27–9	101

Legend: Win (2 points) Loss (0 points) Overtime/shootout loss (1 point)

== Playoffs ==
- The Los Angeles Kings qualified for the playoffs for the first time since 2002, clinching the sixth seed with 101 points.

2010 Stanley Cup Playoffs

Western Conference Quarter-finals: vs. (3) Vancouver Canucks – Vancouver Canucks won series 4–2
#	Date	Visitor	Score	Home	OT	Decision	Attendance	Series	Recap
1	April 15	Los Angeles Kings	Lost 3–2	Vancouver Canucks	OT	Quick (0–1)	18,810	0–1
2	April 17	Los Angeles Kings	Won 3–2	Vancouver Canucks	OT	Quick (1–1)	18,810	1–1
3	April 19	Vancouver Canucks	Won 5–3	Los Angeles Kings		Quick (2–1)	18,264	2–1
4	April 21	Vancouver Canucks	Lost 6–4	Los Angeles Kings		Quick (2–2)	18,322	2–2
5	April 23	Los Angeles Kings	Lost 7–2	Vancouver Canucks		Quick (2–3)	18,810	2–3
6	April 25	Vancouver Canucks	Lost 4–2	Los Angeles Kings		Quick (2–4)	18,287	2–4

Legend: Win Loss

== Player statistics ==
=== Skaters ===
Note: Pos = Position; GP = Games played; G = Goals; A = Assists; Pts = Points; PIM = Penalty minutes; +/- = Plus/minus; PPG = Power-play goals; SHG = Short-handed goals; GWG = Game-winning goals

Regular season

Player	GP	G	A	Pts	+/−	PIM
Anze Kopitar	82	34	47	81	6	16
Drew Doughty	82	16	43	59	20	54
Dustin Brown	82	24	32	56	−6	41
Ryan Smyth	67	22	31	53	8	42
Alexander Frolov	81	19	32	51	−1	26
Jarret Stoll	73	16	31	47	13	40
Michal Handzus	81	20	22	42	4	38
Wayne Simmonds	78	16	24	40	22	116
Jack Johnson	80	8	28	36	−15	48
Justin Williams	49	10	19	29	3	39
Brad Richardson	81	11	16	27	1	37
Scott Parse	59	11	13	24	13	22
Randy Jones	48	5	16	21	−3	28
Sean O'Donnell	78	3	12	15	14	70
Rob Scuderi	73	0	11	11	16	21
Matt Greene	75	2	7	9	4	83
Davis Drewiske	42	1	7	8	−4	14
Oscar Moller	34	4	3	7	−6	4
Teddy Purcell^{‡}	41	3	3	6	−1	4
Fredrik Modin^{†}	20	3	2	5	−2	14
Peter Harrold	39	1	2	3	−2	8
Richard Clune	14	0	2	2	1	26
Jeff Halpern^{†}	16	0	2	2	−1	12
Brandon Segal^{‡}	25	1	1	2	0	20
Corey Elkins	3	1	0	1	−2	0
Jonathan Quick	72	0	1	1	–	2
Jonathan Bernier	3	0	1	1	–	0
Marc-Andre Cliche	1	0	0	0	1	0
Trevor Lewis	5	0	0	0	−3	0
Alec Martinez	4	0	0	0	−2	2
Andrei Loktionov	1	0	0	0	0	0
Brayden Schenn	1	0	0	0	−1	0
Raitis Ivanans	61	0	0	0	−8	136
Erik Ersberg	11	0	0	0	–	0

Playoffs

Player	GP	G	A	Pts	+/−	PIM
Jack Johnson	6	0	7	7	−5	6
Drew Doughty	6	3	4	7	−5	4
Michal Handzus	6	3	2	5	−5	4
Dustin Brown	6	1	4	5	−7	6
Anze Kopitar	6	2	3	5	−1	2
Fredrik Modin	6	3	1	4	−3	2
Alexander Frolov	6	1	3	4	−5	0
Wayne Simmonds	6	2	1	3	1	9
Ryan Smyth	6	1	1	2	0	6
Brad Richardson	6	1	1	2	−7	2
Sean O'Donnell	6	0	1	1	−2	4
Justin Williams	3	0	1	1	0	2
Jarret Stoll	6	1	0	1	−4	4
Matt Greene	6	0	1	1	−4	0
Rob Scuderi	6	0	0	0	−4	6
Jeff Halpern	6	0	0	0	−1	4
Raitis Ivanans	1	0	0	0	0	0
Randy Jones	4	0	0	0	−2	2
Scott Parse	4	0	0	0	−1	0
Richard Clune	4	0	0	0	−2	5
Peter Harrold	2	0	0	0	0	0

=== Goaltenders ===
Note: Pos = Position;GP = Games played; Min, TOI = Minutes played; W = Wins; L = Losses; T,T/OT = Ties; OTL = Overtime losses; GA = Goals-against; GAA = Goals-against average; SO = Shutouts; SA = Shots against; SV = Shots saved; SV% = Save percentage;

Regular season

Player	GP	Min	W	L	OT	GA	GAA	SA	SV	Sv%	SO
Jonathan Quick	72	4258	39	24	7	180	2.54	1927	1747	.907	4
Erik Ersberg	11	551	4	3	2	22	2.40	234	212	.906	0
Jonathan Bernier	3	185	3	0	0	4	1.30	94	90	.957	1

Playoffs

Player	GP	Min	W	L	GA	GAA	SA	SV	Sv%	SO
Jonathan Quick	6	360	2	4	21	3.50	181	160	.884	0
Erik Ersberg	1	13	0	0	2	9.23	4	2	.500	0

^{†}Denotes player spent time with another team before joining Kings. Stats reflect time with the Kings only.
^{‡}Traded mid-season.
Bold/italics denotes franchise record.
Underline denotes currently with a minor league affiliate.

== Awards and records ==
=== Milestones ===
Regular season
Player	Milestone	Reached
Alec Martinez	1st career NHL game	October 3, 2009
Davis Drewiske	1st career NHL goal	October 6, 2009
Justin Williams	200th career NHL assist	October 12, 2009
Dustin Brown	200th career NHL point	October 19, 2009
Anze Kopitar	1st career NHL hat trick	October 22, 2009
Terry Murray	400th career NHL coaching win	October 22, 2009
Scott Parse	1st career NHL game	October 24, 2009
Scott Parse	1st career NHL assist	October 24, 2009
Scott Parse	1st career NHL goal	October 24, 2009
Wayne Simmonds	100th career NHL game	November 9, 2009
Drew Doughty	100th career NHL game	November 11, 2009
Michal Handzus	700th career NHL game	November 11, 2009
Brayden Schenn	1st career NHL game	November 26, 2009
Brad Richardson	200th career NHL game	December 12, 2009
Corey Elkins	1st career NHL game	December 15, 2009
Corey Elkins	1st career NHL goal	December 17, 2009

=== Awards ===
Regular season
Player	Award	Awarded
Jonathan Quick	NHL Second Star of the Week	October 12, 2009
Anze Kopitar	NHL First Star of the Week	October 26, 2009
Jonathan Quick	NHL First Star of the Week	December 14, 2009

- Drew Doughty was named as one of the three finalists for the James Norris Memorial Trophy awarded to the outstanding defenseman in the NHL. The award will be handed out at the 2010 NHL Awards Show on June 23. Doughty became the second youngest player in NHL history to be nominated for this award, with Bobby Orr being the youngest ever. Doughty would be the second ever member of the Kings to win this award; Rob Blake is the only other member of the Kings to win this award.

== Transactions ==
The Kings have been involved in the following transactions during the 2009–10 season.

=== Trades ===
Date	Details
June 27, 2009	To New York Rangers Brian Boyle	To Los Angeles Kings 3rd-round pick in 2010
June 27, 2009	To Calgary Flames 3rd-round pick (74th overall) in 2009	To Los Angeles Kings 3rd-round pick (84th overall) in 2009; 4th-round pick (107th overall) in 2009
June 27, 2009	To Atlanta Thrashers 4th-round pick (117th overall) in 2009; 4th-round pick (120th overall) in 2009; 7th-round pick (203rd overall) in 2009	To Los Angeles Kings 4th-round pick (95th overall) in 2009
June 27, 2009	To Florida Panthers 4th-round pick (107th overall) in 2009; 5th-round pick (138th overall) in 2009	To Los Angeles Kings 3rd-round pick in 2010
July 3, 2009	To Colorado Avalanche Kyle Quincey; Tom Preissing; 5th-round pick in 2010	To Los Angeles Kings Ryan Smyth
March 3, 2010	To Tampa Bay Lightning Teddy Purcell; 3rd-round pick in 2010	To Los Angeles Kings Jeff Halpern
March 3, 2010	To Columbus Blue Jackets Conditional 7th-round pick in 2010 (Note: Condition not satisfied.)	To Los Angeles Kings Fredrik Modin

=== Free agents acquired ===
Player	Former team	Contract terms
Dwight King	Lethbridge Hurricanes (WHL)	3 years, entry-level
Rob Scuderi	Pittsburgh Penguins	4 years, $13.6 million
Brandon Segal	Tampa Bay Lightning	2 years
Justin Azevedo	Manchester Monarchs	Multi-year, entry-level
Juraj Mikus	TPS Turku (SM-liiga)	2 years, entry-level
Kyle Clifford	Barrie Colts (OHL)	3 years, entry-level
Jake Muzzin	Sault Ste. Marie Greyhounds (OHL)	3 years, entry-level

=== Free agents lost ===
Player	New team	Contract terms
Matt Moulson	New York Islanders	1 year
Vladimir Dravecky	HC Kosice (Slovak Extraliga)	1 year
Derek Armstrong	St. Louis Blues	1 year, 2-way (NHL/AHL)
Dan Taylor	Syracuse Crunch (AHL)	1 year, two-way (AHL/ECHL)
Kyle Calder	Anaheim Ducks	1 year, two-way (NHL/ECHL)

=== Acquired via waivers ===
Player	Former team	Date claimed off waivers
Randy Jones	Philadelphia Flyers	October 29, 2009

=== Lost via waivers ===
Player	New team	Date claimed off waivers
Brandon Segal	Dallas Stars	February 11, 2010

=== Player signings ===
Player	Contract terms
Kevin Westgarth	3 years
Scott Parse	1 year
Joe Piskula	1 year
Jack Johnson	2 years, $2.85 million
Teddy Purcell	1 year
Drew Bagnall	1 year
Davis Drewiske	3 Year, $600,000
Jonathan Quick	3 Year, $1,800,000

=== Miscellaneous ===
Player	Date	Transaction
Jean-Francois Berube	September 16, 2009	Returned to Montreal Junior Hockey Club (QMJHL)
Nicolas Deslauriers	September 16, 2009	Returned to Rouyn-Noranda Huskies (QMJHL)
Martin Jones	September 16, 2009	Returned to Calgary Hitmen (WHL)
Brandon Kozun	September 16, 2009	Returned to Calgary Hitmen (WHL)
Linden Vey	September 16, 2009	Returned to Medicine Hat Tigers (WHL)
Tyler Maxwell	September 16, 2009	Released from tryout
Milan Doczy	September 16, 2009	Released from tryout
Radko Gudas	September 16, 2009	Released from tryout
Justin Azevedo	September 20, 2009	Assigned to Manchester Monarchs (AHL)
Corey Elkins	September 20, 2009	Assigned to Manchester Monarchs (AHL)
Bud Holloway	September 20, 2009	Assigned to Manchester Monarchs (AHL)
Dwight King	September 20, 2009	Assigned to Manchester Monarchs (AHL)
Andrei Loktionov	September 20, 2009	Assigned to Manchester Monarchs (AHL)
David Meckler	September 20, 2009	Assigned to Manchester Monarchs (AHL)
Juraj Mikus	September 20, 2009	Assigned to Manchester Monarchs (AHL)
Oscar Moller	September 20, 2009	Assigned to Manchester Monarchs (AHL)
Patrick Mullen	September 20, 2009	Assigned to Manchester Monarchs (AHL)
Jordan Nolan	September 20, 2009	Assigned to Manchester Monarchs (AHL)
Scott Parse	September 20, 2009	Assigned to Manchester Monarchs (AHL)
Michael Pelech	September 20, 2009	Assigned to Manchester Monarchs (AHL)
Slava Voynov	September 20, 2009	Assigned to Manchester Monarchs (AHL)
Geoff Walker	September 20, 2009	Assigned to Manchester Monarchs (AHL)
Jeff Zatkoff	September 20, 2009	Assigned to Manchester Monarchs (AHL)
Colten Teubert	September 20, 2009	Returned to Regina Pats (WHL)
Dennis McCauley	September 20, 2009	Released from tryout
Drew Bagnall	September 22, 2009	Assigned to Manchester Monarchs (AHL)
Gabe Gauthier	September 22, 2009	Assigned to Manchester Monarchs (AHL)
Brandon Segal	September 22, 2009	Assigned to Manchester Monarchs (AHL)
John Zeiler	September 22, 2009	Assigned to Manchester Monarchs (AHL)
Sean O'Donnell	September 23, 2009	Suspended by NHL for 3 Preseason games and 2 Regular Season games
Andrew Campbell	September 24, 2009	Assigned to Manchester Monarchs (AHL)
Marc-Andre Cliche	September 24, 2009	Assigned to Manchester Monarchs (AHL)
Kyle Clifford	September 24, 2009	Returned to Barrie Colts (OHL)
Joe Piskula	September 26, 2009	Assigned to Manchester Monarchs (AHL)
Jonathan Bernier	September 28, 2009	Assigned to Manchester Monarchs (AHL)
Thomas Hickey	September 28, 2009	Assigned to Manchester Monarchs (AHL)
Kevin Westgarth	September 28, 2009	Assigned to Manchester Monarchs (AHL)
Brayden Schenn	September 28, 2009	Returned to Brandon Wheat Kings (WHL)
Richard Clune	September 30, 2009	Placed on Injured Reserve retroactive to September 26
Dwight King	October 2, 2009	Reassigned to Ontario Reign (ECHL)
David Kolomatis	October 2, 2009	Signed to a Professional Tryout Agreement with Manchester Monarchs (AHL)
Jordan Nolan	October 2, 2009	Released by Manchester Monarchs (AHL)
Michael Pelech	October 2, 2009	Signed to a one-year contract with Manchester Monarchs (AHL) and assigned to Ontario Reign (ECHL)
Richard Clune	October 9, 2009	Activated from Injured Reserve and assigned to Manchester Monarchs (AHL)
Oscar Moller	October 17, 2009	Recalled from Manchester Monarchs (AHL)
Oscar Moller	October 20, 2009	Assigned to Manchester Monarchs (AHL)
Scott Parse	October 23, 2009	Recalled from Manchester Monarchs (AHL)
Alec Martinez	October 29, 2009	Placed on Injured Reserve retroactive to October 5, 2009
Trevor Lewis	October 30, 2009	Assigned to Manchester Monarchs (AHL)
Alec Martinez	November 19, 2009	Activated from Injured Reserve and assigned to Manchester Monarchs (AHL)
Ryan Smyth	November 23, 2009	Placed on Injured Reserve retroactive to November 17
Andrei Loktionov	November 23, 2009	Recalled from Manchester Monarchs (AHL)
Brandon Segal	November 23, 2009	Recalled from Manchester Monarchs (AHL)
Brayden Schenn	November 26, 2009	Recalled under Emergency circumstances from Brandon Wheat Kings (WHL) and signed to an Amateur Tryout Agreement
Andrei Loktionov	November 26, 2009	Placed on Injured Reserve
Dwight King	December 1, 2009	Reassigned to Manchester Monarchs (AHL) from Ontario Reign (ECHL)
Oscar Moller	December 6, 2009	Recalled from Manchester Monarchs (AHL)
Brandon Segal	December 9, 2009	Placed on Injured Reserve retroactive to December 2
Corey Elkins	December 14, 2009	Recalled from Manchester Monarchs (AHL) under Emergency Circumstances
Wayne Simmonds	December 16, 2009	Placed on Injured Reserve retroactive to December 11
Alec Martinez	December 16, 2009	Recalled from Manchester Monarchs (AHL)
Ryan Smyth	December 18, 2009	Activated from Injured Reserve
Corey Elkins	December 18, 2009	Assigned to Manchester Monarchs (AHL)
Alec Martinez	December 18, 2009	Assigned to Manchester Monarchs (AHL)
Oscar Moller	December 18, 2009	Assigned to Manchester Monarchs (AHL)
Scott Parse	December 18, 2009	Assigned to Manchester Monarchs (AHL)
Corey Elkins	December 23, 2009	Recalled from Manchester Monarchs (AHL)
Oscar Moller	December 23, 2009	Recalled from Manchester Monarchs (AHL)
Wayne Simmonds	December 26, 2009	Activated from Injured Reserve
Brandon Segal	December 26, 2009	Activated from Injured Reserve
Jarret Stoll	December 26, 2009	Placed on Injured Reserve retroactive to December 15, 2009
Scott Parse	December 28, 2009	Recalled from Manchester Monarchs (AHL)
Corey Elkins	December 28, 2009	Loaned to Manchester Monarchs (AHL)
Justin Williams	December 28, 2009	Placed on Injured Reserve retroactive to December 27, 2009
Jarret Stoll	January 4, 2010	Activated from Injured Reserve
Alec Martinez	January 6, 2010	Recalled from Manchester Monarchs (AHL)
Randy Jones	January 6, 2010	Placed on Injured Reserve retroactive to December 16, 2009
Alec Martinez	January 9, 2010	Assigned to Manchester Monarchs (AHL)
Randy Jones	January 9, 2010	Activated from Injured Reserve

== Draft picks ==
Los Angeles' picks at the 2009 NHL entry draft in Montreal.

Round	#	Player	Position	Nationality	College/junior/club team (league)
1	5	Brayden Schenn	C	Canada	Brandon Wheat Kings (WHL)
2	35	Kyle Clifford	LW	Canada	Barrie Colts (OHL)
3	84 (from New Jersey via Calgary)	Nicolas Deslauriers	D	Canada	Rouyn-Noranda Huskies (QMJHL)
4	95 (from Atlanta)	Jean-Francois Berube	G	Canada	Montreal Junior Hockey Club (QMJHL)
4	96	Linden Vey	RW	Canada	Medicine Hat Tigers (WHL)
5	126	David Kolomatis	D	United States	Owen Sound Attack (OHL)
6	156	Michael Pelech	C/LW	Canada	Mississauga St. Michael's Majors (OHL)
6	179 (from Chicago)	Brandon Kozun	RW	United States	Calgary Hitmen (WHL)
7	186	Jordan Nolan	C	Canada	Sault Ste. Marie Greyhounds (OHL)
7	198 (from St. Louis)	Nic Dowd	C	United States	Wenatchee Wild (NAHL)

== See also ==
- 2009–10 NHL season

== Farm teams ==
The Kings have one American Hockey League affiliate in the Manchester Monarchs. They also have one ECHL affiliate in the Ontario Reign. They have discontinued their affiliation with the Reading Royals. Both the Monarchs and the Reign are owned in part by the Kings' parent company Anschutz Entertainment Group.
