= List of Los Angeles Kings seasons =

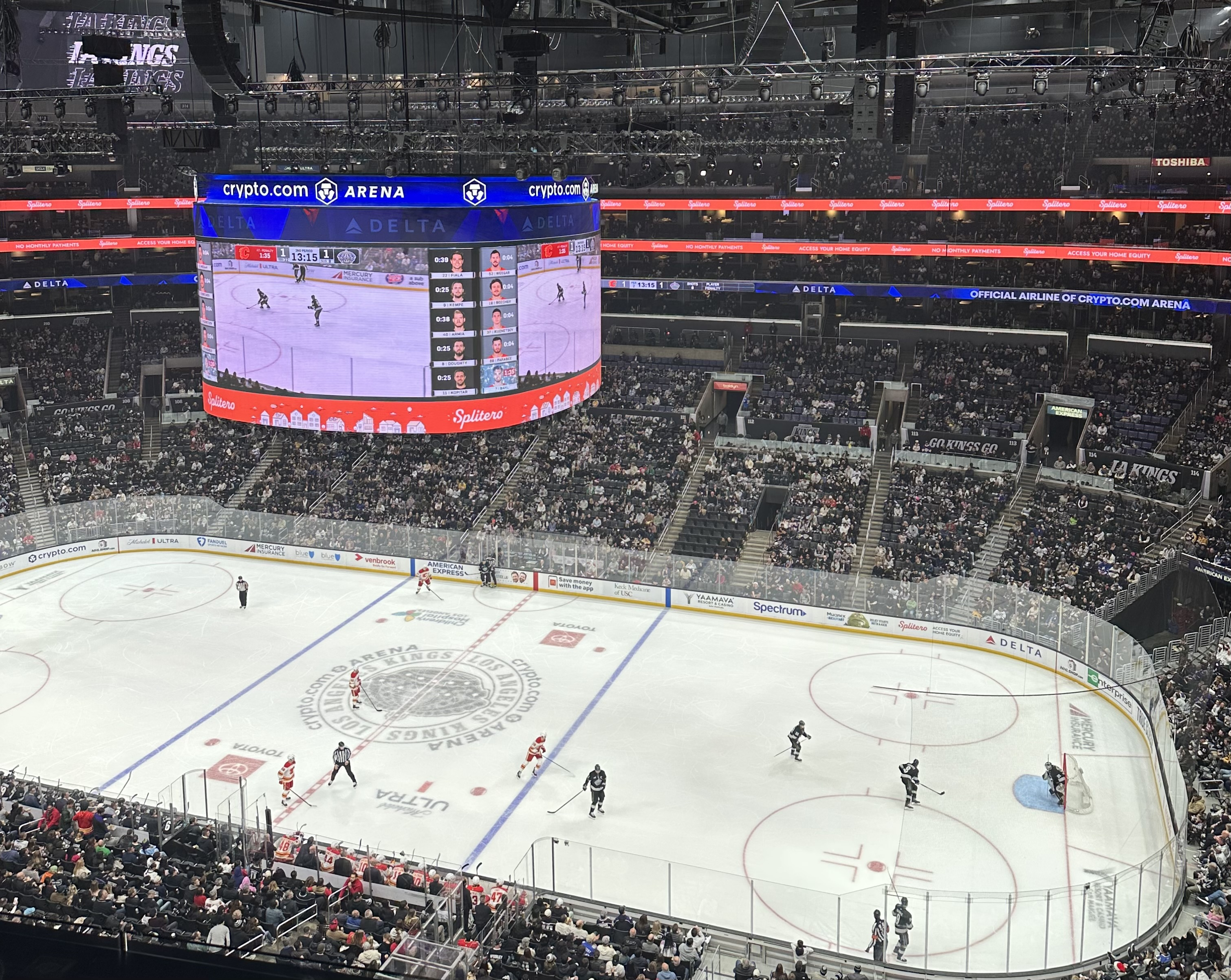
The Kings have played at Crypto.com Arena since 1999.

The Los Angeles Kings are a professional ice hockey team based in Los Angeles. The team is a member of the Pacific Division of the Western Conference of the National Hockey League (NHL). Since their inception in 1967, the Kings have reached three Stanley Cup Finals and won the title twice, in 2012 and 2014.

== Table key ==
Key of colors and symbols
Color/symbol	Explanation
†	Stanley Cup champions
‡	Conference champions
↑	Division champions
#	Led league in points

Key of terms and abbreviations
Term or abbreviation	Definition
Finish	Final position in division or league standings
GP	Number of games played
W	Number of wins
L	Number of losses
T	Number of ties
OT	Number of losses in overtime (since the 1999–2000 season)
Pts	Number of points
GF	Goals for (goals scored by the Kings)
GA	Goals against (goals scored by the Kings' opponents)
—	Does not apply

== Year by year ==
Year by year listing of all seasons played by the Los Angeles Kings
NHL season	Kings season	Conference	Division	Regular season									Postseason					
NHL season	Kings season	Conference	Division	Finish	GP	W	L	T	OT	Pts	GF	GA	GP	W	L	GF	GA	Result
1967–68	1967–68	—	West	2nd	74	31	33	10	—	72	200	224	7	3	4	21	26	Lost in quarterfinals, 3–4 (North Stars)
1968–69	1968–69	—	West	4th	76	24	42	10	—	58	185	260	11	4	7	28	41	Won in quarterfinals, 4–3 (Seals); Lost in semifinals, 0–4 (Blues)
1969–70	1969–70	—	West	6th	76	14	52	10	—	38	168	290	—	—	—	—	—	Did not qualify
1970–71	1970–71	—	West	5th	78	25	40	13	—	63	239	303	—	—	—	—	—	Did not qualify
1971–72	1971–72	—	West	7th	78	20	49	9	—	49	206	305	—	—	—	—	—	Did not qualify
1972–73	1972–73	—	West	6th	78	31	36	11	—	73	232	245	—	—	—	—	—	Did not qualify
1973–74	1973–74	—	West	3rd	78	33	33	12	—	78	233	231	5	1	4	7	10	Lost in quarterfinals, 1–4 (Black Hawks)
1974–75	1974–75	Wales (Note: The NHL realigned before the 1974–75 season. The Kings were placed in the Prince of Wales Conference's Norris Division.)	Norris	2nd	80	42	17	21	—	105	269	185	3	1	2	6	7	Lost in preliminary round, 1–2 (Maple Leafs)
1975–76	1975–76	Wales	Norris	2nd	80	38	33	9	—	85	263	265	9	5	4	17	27	Won in preliminary round, 2–0 (Flames); Lost in quarterfinals, 3–4 (Bruins)
1976–77	1976–77	Wales	Norris	2nd	80	34	31	15	—	83	271	241	9	4	5	35	37	Won in preliminary round, 2–1 (Flames); Lost in quarterfinals, 2–4 (Bruins)
1977–78	1977–78	Wales	Norris	3rd	80	31	34	15	—	77	243	245	2	0	2	3	11	Lost in preliminary round, 0–2 (Maple Leafs)
1978–79	1978–79	Wales	Norris	3rd	80	34	34	12	—	80	292	286	2	0	2	2	9	Lost in preliminary round, 0–2 (Rangers)
1979–80	1979–80	Wales	Norris	2nd	80	30	36	14	—	74	290	313	4	1	3	10	21	Lost in preliminary round, 1–3 (Islanders)
1980–81	1980–81	Wales	Norris	2nd	80	43	24	13	—	99	337	290	4	1	3	12	23	Lost in preliminary round, 1–3 (Rangers)
1981–82	1981–82	Campbell (Note: Before the 1981–82 season, the Kings moved from Prince of Wales Conference and its Norris Division to Clarence Campbell Conference and its Smythe Division.)	Smythe	4th	80	24	41	15	—	63	314	369	10	4	6	41	42	Won in division semifinals, 3–2 (Oilers); Lost in division finals, 1–4 (Canucks)
1982–83	1982–83	Campbell	Smythe	5th	80	27	41	12	—	66	308	365	—	—	—	—	—	Did not qualify
1983–84	1983–84	Campbell	Smythe	5th	80	23	44	13	—	59	309	376	—	—	—	—	—	Did not qualify
1984–85	1984–85	Campbell	Smythe	4th	80	34	32	14	—	82	339	326	3	0	3	7	11	Lost in division semifinals, 0–3 (Oilers)
1985–86	1985–86	Campbell	Smythe	5th	80	23	49	8	—	54	284	389	—	—	—	—	—	Did not qualify
1986–87	1986–87	Campbell	Smythe	4th	80	31	41	8	—	70	318	341	5	1	4	20	32	Lost in division semifinals, 1–4 (Oilers)
1987–88	1987–88	Campbell	Smythe	4th	80	30	42	8	—	68	318	359	5	1	4	18	30	Lost in division semifinals, 1–4 (Flames)
1988–89	1988–89	Campbell	Smythe	2nd	80	42	31	7	—	91	376	335	11	4	7	36	42	Won in division semifinals, 4–3 (Oilers); Lost in division finals, 0–4 (Flames)
1989–90	1989–90	Campbell	Smythe	4th	80	34	39	7	—	75	338	337	10	4	6	39	48	Won in division semifinals, 4–2 (Flames); Lost in division finals, 0–4 (Oilers)
1990–91	1990–91	Campbell	Smythe↑	1st	80	46	24	10	—	102	340	254	12	6	6	46	37	Won in division semifinals, 4–2 (Canucks); Lost in division finals, 2–4 (Oilers)
1991–92	1991–92	Campbell	Smythe	2nd	80	35	31	14	—	84	287	296	6	2	4	18	23	Lost in division semifinals, 2–4 (Oilers)
1992–93	1992–93	Campbell‡	Smythe	3rd	84	39	35	10	—	88	338	340	24	13	11	93	91	Won in division semifinals, 4–2 (Flames); Won in division finals, 4–2 (Canucks); Won in conference finals, 4–3 (Maple Leafs); Lost in Stanley Cup Final, 1–4 (Canadiens)
1993–94	1993–94	Western (Note: The NHL realigned into Eastern and Western conferences prior to the 1993–94 season. Los Angeles was placed in the Western Conference's Pacific Division.)	Pacific	5th	84	27	45	12	—	66	294	322	—	—	—	—	—	Did not qualify
1994–95	1994–95	Western	Pacific	4th	48 (Note: The season was shortened to 48 games because of the 1994–95 NHL lockout.)	16	23	9	—	41	142	174	—	—	—	—	—	Did not qualify
1995–96	1995–96	Western	Pacific	6th	82	24	40	18	—	66	256	302	—	—	—	—	—	Did not qualify
1996–97	1996–97	Western	Pacific	6th	82	28	43	11	—	67	214	268	—	—	—	—	—	Did not qualify
1997–98	1997–98	Western	Pacific	2nd	82	38	33	11	—	87	227	225	4	0	4	8	16	Lost in conference quarterfinals, 0–4 (Blues)
1998–99	1998–99	Western	Pacific	5th	82	32	45	5	—	69	189	222	—	—	—	—	—	Did not qualify
1999–2000	1999–2000	Western	Pacific	2nd	82	39	27	12	4 (Note: Beginning with the 1999–2000 season, teams received one point for losing a regular season game in overtime.)	94	245	228	4	0	4	6	15	Lost in conference quarterfinals, 0–4 (Red Wings)
2000–01	2000–01	Western	Pacific	3rd	82	38	28	13	3	92	252	228	13	7	6	25	34	Won in conference quarterfinals, 4–2 (Red Wings); Lost in conference semifinals, 3–4 (Avalanche)
2001–02	2001–02	Western	Pacific	3rd	82	40	27	11	4	95	214	190	7	3	4	13	16	Lost in conference quarterfinals, 3–4 (Avalanche)
2002–03	2002–03	Western	Pacific	3rd	82	33	36	6	7	78	203	221	—	—	—	—	—	Did not qualify
2003–04	2003–04	Western	Pacific	3rd	82	28	29	16	9	81	205	217	—	—	—	—	—	Did not qualify
2004–05 (Note: The season was canceled because of the 2004–05 NHL lockout.)	2004–05	Season canceled due to 2004–05 NHL lockout																
2005–06	2005–06	Western	Pacific	4th	82	42	35	— (Note: Before the 2005–06 season, the NHL instituted a penalty shootout for regular season games that remained tied after a five-minute overtime period, which eliminated ties.)	5	89	249	270	—	—	—	—	—	Did not qualify
2006–07	2006–07	Western	Pacific	4th	82	27	41	—	14	68	227	283	—	—	—	—	—	Did not qualify
2007–08	2007–08	Western	Pacific	5th	82	32	43	—	7	71	231	283	—	—	—	—	—	Did not qualify
2008–09	2008–09	Western	Pacific	5th	82	34	37	—	11	79	207	234	—	—	—	—	—	Did not qualify
2009–10	2009–10	Western	Pacific	3rd	82	46	27	—	9	101	241	219	6	2	4	18	25	Lost in conference quarterfinals, 2–4 (Canucks)
2010–11	2010–11	Western	Pacific	4th	82	46	30	—	6	98	219	198	6	2	4	20	20	Lost in conference quarterfinals, 2–4 (Sharks)
2011–12	2011–12	Western‡	Pacific	3rd	82	40	27	—	15	95	194	179	20	16	4	57	30	Won in conference quarterfinals, 4–1 (Canucks); Won in conference semifinals, 4–0 (Blues); Won in conference finals, 4–1 (Coyotes); Won in Stanley Cup Final, 4–2 (Devils)†
2012–13	2012–13	Western	Pacific	2nd	48 (Note: The season was shortened to 48 games because of the 2012–13 NHL lockout.)	27	16	—	5	59	133	118	18	9	9	37	34	Won in conference quarterfinals, 4–2 (Blues); Won in conference semifinals, 4–3 (Sharks); Lost in conference finals, 1–4 (Blackhawks)
2013–14	2013–14	Western‡	Pacific	3rd	82	46	28	—	8	100	206	174	26	16	10	88	70	Won in first round, 4–3 (Sharks); Won in second round, 4–3 (Ducks); Won in conference finals, 4–3 (Blackhawks); Won in Stanley Cup Final, 4–1 (Rangers)†
2014–15	2014–15	Western	Pacific	4th	82	40	27	—	15	95	220	205	—	—	—	—	—	Did not qualify
2015–16	2015–16	Western	Pacific	2nd	82	48	28	—	6	102	225	195	5	1	4	11	16	Lost in first round, 1–4 (Sharks)
2016–17	2016–17	Western	Pacific	5th	82	39	35	—	8	86	201	205	—	—	—	—	—	Did not qualify
2017–18	2017–18	Western	Pacific	4th	82	45	29	—	8	98	239	203	4	0	4	3	7	Lost in first round, 0–4 (Golden Knights)
2018–19	2018–19	Western	Pacific	8th	82	31	42	—	9	71	202	263	—	—	—	—	—	Did not qualify
2019–20	2019–20	Western	Pacific	7th	70 (Note: The 2019–20 NHL regular season was suspended on March 12, 2020, due to the COVID-19 pandemic. The league made its return to play on August 1, 2020, with a 24-team playoff format.)	29	35	—	6	64	178	212	—	—	—	—	—	Did not qualify
2020–21 (Note: Due to the COVID-19 pandemic, the 2020–21 NHL season was shortened to 56 games.)	2020–21	—	West	6th	56	21	28	—	7	49	143	170	—	—	—	—	—	Did not qualify
2021–22	2021–22	Western	Pacific	3rd	82	44	27	—	11	99	239	236	7	3	4	17	27	Lost in first round, 3–4 (Oilers)
2022–23	2022–23	Western	Pacific	3rd	82	47	25	—	10	104	280	257	6	2	4	20	25	Lost in first round, 2–4 (Oilers)
2023–24	2023–24	Western	Pacific	3rd	82	44	27	—	11	99	256	215	5	1	4	13	22	Lost in first round, 1–4 (Oilers)
2024–25	2024–25	Western	Pacific	2nd	82	48	25	—	9	105	250	206	6	2	4	24	27	Lost in first round, 2–4 (Oilers)
2025–26	2025–26	Western	Pacific	4th	82	35	27	—	20	90	225	247	4	0	4	5	13	Lost in first round, 0–4 (Avalanche)
Totals (Note: Totals as of the completion of the 2025–26 season)					4,582	1,972	1,960	303	226	4,594	14,303	14,922	283	119	164	824	965	35 playoff appearances

=== All-time records ===
Statistic	GP	W	L	T	OT
Regular season record (1967–present)	4,500	1,937	1,933	424	206
Postseason record (1967–present)	279	119	160	—	—
All-time regular and postseason record	4,779	2,056	2,093	424	206
All-time series record: 21–32

== See also ==
- List of NHL seasons
