= Brandon Segal =

Canadian ice hockey player (born 1983)

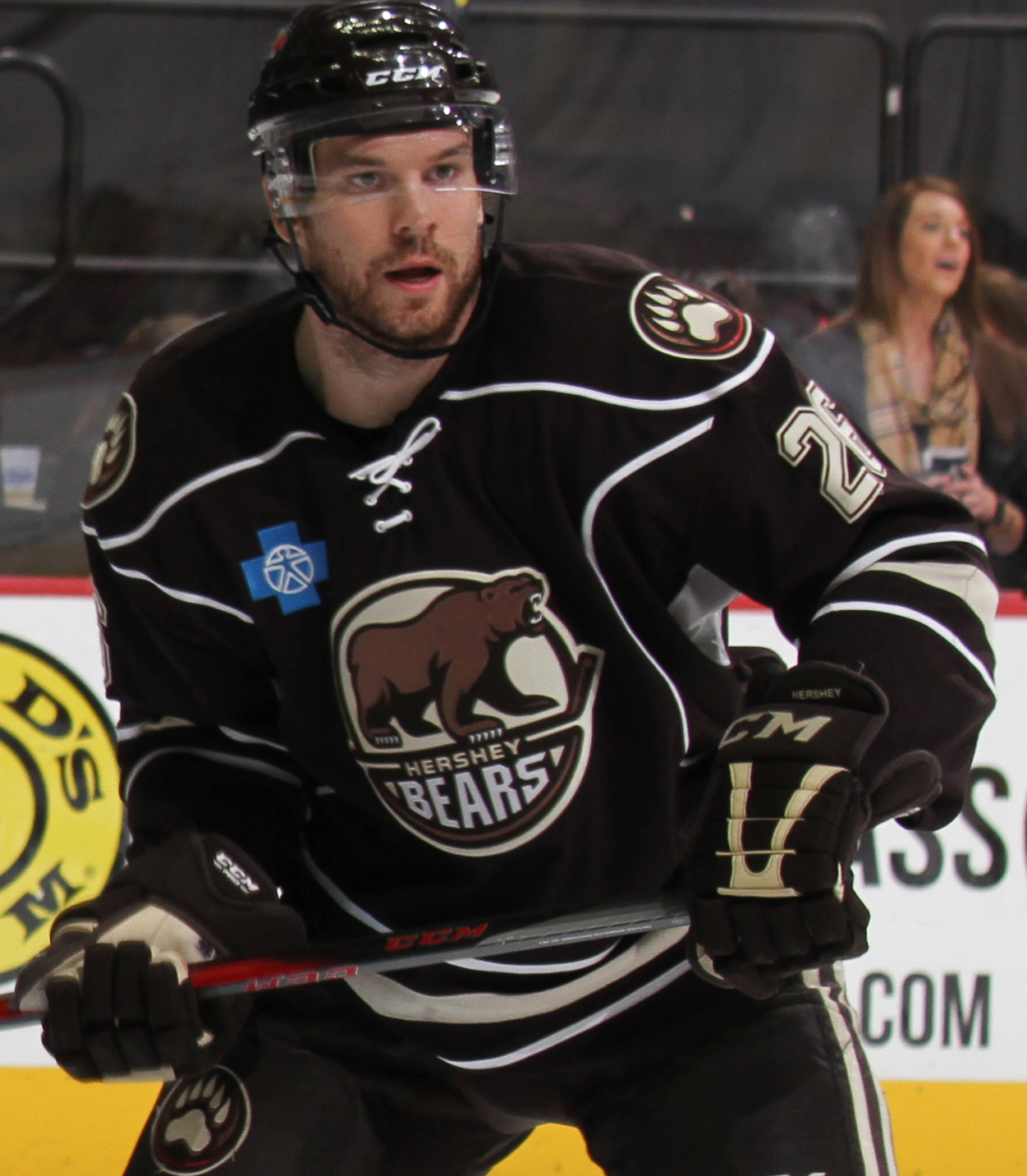
- Segal with the Hershey Bears in 2013
- Born: July 12, 1983 (age 43) Delta, British Columbia, Canada
- Height: 6 ft 2 in (188 cm)
- Weight: 214 lb (97 kg; 15 st 4 lb)
- Position: Right wing
- Shot: Right
- Played for: Tampa Bay Lightning; Los Angeles Kings; Dallas Stars; New York Rangers; KHL Medveščak Zagreb; Thomas Sabo Ice Tigers
- NHL draft: 102nd overall, 2002; Nashville Predators
- Playing career: 2004–2019

Brandon Segal (born July 12, 1983) is a Canadian former professional ice hockey player. He most recently played under contract to the Thomas Sabo Ice Tigers of the Deutsche Eishockey Liga (DEL).

== Playing career ==
As a youth, Segal played in the 1997 Quebec International Pee-Wee Hockey Tournament with a minor ice hockey team from North Delta, British Columbia.

Segal was originally drafted in the fourth round (102nd overall) by the Nashville Predators in the 2002 NHL entry draft from the Calgary Hitmen, and spent four seasons with their AHL affiliate, the Milwaukee Admirals.

On June 25, 2007, Segal was traded to the Anaheim Ducks for future considerations. He was then assigned to affiliate, the Portland Pirates to begin the 2007–08 season. After 54 games with the Pirates, Segal was traded by the Ducks along with a 7th round draft pick in the 2008 NHL entry draft to the Tampa Bay Lightning for Jay Leach on February 26, 2008. Segal continued in the AHL, playing for the Lightning's affiliate, the Norfolk Admirals.

In the 2008–09 season, Segal spent the majority of the season with the Admirals. In the late end of the season, Brandon made his NHL debut with the Lightning in a 3–1 defeat to the Pittsburgh Penguins on March 3, 2009.

On July 13, 2009, Segal signed a two-year contract with the Los Angeles Kings. After starting the 2009–10 season with the Manchester Monarchs of the AHL, he was recalled by the Kings and scored his first NHL goal on January 9, 2010 against Chris Mason of the St. Louis Blues.

On February 11, 2010, Segal was claimed off waivers by the Dallas Stars. Segal made an immediate impact with the Stars, scoring the game-winning goal and an assist in his debut against the Phoenix Coyotes on February 13, 2010.

On January 11, 2011, Segal cleared waivers and was assigned to play in the AHL with the Texas Stars.

On August 31, 2011, Segal signed a one-year, two-way contract with the Chicago Blackhawks. On September 26, 2011 the Blackhawks assigned Segal to their AHL affiliate, the Rockford IceHogs. On February 21, 2012, Segal was dealt by the Blackhawks, returning to his first NHL team the Tampa Bay Lightning in exchange for Matt Fornataro from the Norfolk Admirals.

On July 11, 2012, Segal signed with the New York Rangers. Due to the lockout he was assigned directly to AHL affiliate, the Connecticut Whale, for the beginning of the season. Upon a resolution to the lockout, Segal was recalled by the Rangers for the shortened 2012–13 season and featured in the opening night 3-1 defeat to the Boston Bruins on January 19, 2013. It was his only game for the Rangers before he was returned to the AHL with the Whale.

On August 20, 2013, Segal continued his journeyman career, signing a one-year two way contract as a free agent with the Washington Capitals. In 63 games, Segal contributed with 17 goals and 44 points with the Capitals AHL affiliate, the Hershey Bears in the 2013–14 season.

Segal signed his first contract abroad on a two-year deal in the Kontinental Hockey League with Croatian club, KHL Medveščak Zagreb on July 8, 2014. In the 2014–15 season, Segal was unable to lead the attack in Zagreb as expected and produced only 25 points in 54 games as the club missed the post-season.

On May 26, 2015, Segal left Croatia mid-contract to sign in the German league with the Thomas Sabo Ice Tigers of the DEL on a two-year deal.

== Career statistics ==
=== Regular season and playoffs ===
			Regular season					Playoffs
Season	Team	League	GP	G	A	Pts	PIM	GP	G	A	Pts	PIM
1999–2000	Calgary Hitmen	WHL	44	2	6	8	76	13	1	1	2	13
1999–2000	Delta Ice Hawks	PIJHL	—	—	—	—	—	3	0	1	1	2
2000–01	Calgary Hitmen	WHL	72	16	11	27	103	12	1	1	2	17
2001–02	Calgary Hitmen	WHL	71	43	40	83	122	7	1	4	5	16
2002–03	Calgary Hitmen	WHL	71	31	27	58	104	5	2	2	4	4
2003–04	Calgary Hitmen	WHL	28	18	12	30	29	—	—	—	—	—
2003–04	Milwaukee Admirals	AHL	44	11	10	21	54	13	2	1	3	21
2004–05	Milwaukee Admirals	AHL	59	7	8	15	45	3	1	0	1	11
2004–05	Rockford IceHogs	UHL	10	5	4	9	27	11	11	5	16	10
2005–06	Milwaukee Admirals	AHL	79	18	15	33	124	21	1	2	3	16
2006–07	Milwaukee Admirals	AHL	77	20	9	29	84	4	1	0	1	2
2007–08	Portland Pirates	AHL	54	5	9	14	46	—	—	—	—	—
2007–08	Norfolk Admirals	AHL	22	7	6	13	25	—	—	—	—	—
2008–09	Norfolk Admirals	AHL	69	26	26	52	95	—	—	—	—	—
2008–09	Tampa Bay Lightning	NHL	2	0	0	0	0	—	—	—	—	—
2009–10	Manchester Monarchs	AHL	21	6	8	14	34	—	—	—	—	—
2009–10	Los Angeles Kings	NHL	25	1	1	2	20	—	—	—	—	—
2009–10	Dallas Stars	NHL	19	5	5	10	18	—	—	—	—	—
2010–11	Dallas Stars	NHL	46	5	5	10	41	—	—	—	—	—
2010–11	Texas Stars	AHL	30	7	10	17	38	—	—	—	—	—
2011–12	Rockford IceHogs	AHL	53	13	12	25	63	—	—	—	—	—
2011–12	Norfolk Admirals	AHL	8	5	6	11	6	18	5	4	9	17
2011–12	Tampa Bay Lightning	NHL	10	0	0	0	4	—	—	—	—	—
2012–13	Connecticut Whale	AHL	73	24	20	44	82	—	—	—	—	—
2012–13	New York Rangers	NHL	1	0	0	0	2	—	—	—	—	—
2013–14	Hershey Bears	AHL	63	17	27	44	64	—	—	—	—	—
2014–15	KHL Medveščak Zagreb	KHL	54	10	15	25	52	—	—	—	—	—
2015–16	Thomas Sabo Ice Tigers	DEL	47	12	12	24	61	12	3	2	5	6
2016–17	Thomas Sabo Ice Tigers	DEL	52	16	16	32	46	13	4	2	6	6
2017–18	Thomas Sabo Ice Tigers	DEL	52	13	14	27	16	12	2	1	3	4
2018–19	Thomas Sabo Ice Tigers	DEL	42	7	8	15	34	4	2	0	2	0
AHL totals			652	166	166	332	760	59	10	7	17	67
NHL totals			103	11	11	22	85	—	—	—	—	—
DEL totals			193	48	50	98	157	41	11	5	16	16

=== International ===
Year	Team	Event	Result	GP	G	A	Pts	PIM
2000	Canada Pacific	WHC17	3rd place, bronze medalist(s)	5	0	1	1	6
Junior totals				5	0	1	1	6
