= Corey Elkins =

American ice hockey player (born 1985)

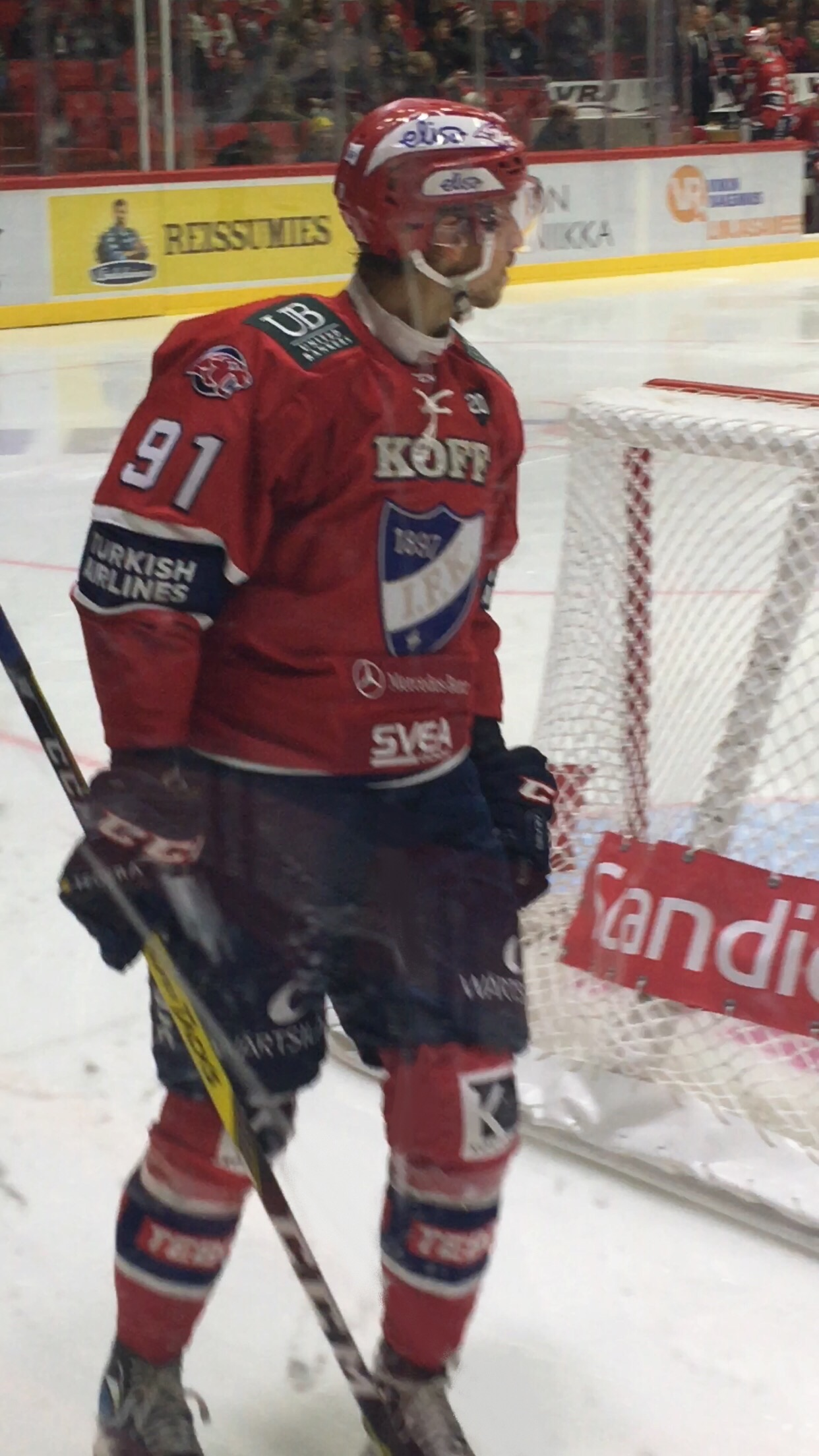
- Elkins playing for HIFK Helsinki in 2016.
- Born: February 23, 1985 (age 41) West Bloomfield, Michigan, U.S.
- Height: 6 ft 4 in (193 cm)
- Weight: 214 lb (97 kg; 15 st 4 lb)
- Position: Center
- Shot: Left
- Played for: Manglerud Star; HIFK; HC Pardubice; Los Angeles Kings
- NHL draft: Undrafted
- Playing career: 2009–2020

Corey Alan Elkins (born February 23, 1985) is an American former ice hockey center who played 3 games in the National Hockey League with the Los Angeles Kings. The rest of his career, which lasted from 2009 to 2020, was spent in the minor leagues and then in Europe.

== Playing career ==
Undrafted, Elkins attended Keith Elementary school in West Bloomfield, Michigan. Elkins played collegiate hockey with Ohio State University of the Central Collegiate Hockey Association before signing an entry-level contract and appearing in 3 games with the Los Angeles Kings of the National Hockey League (NHL)

After just two seasons within the Kings organization, Elkins left for abroad, linking up with HC Pardubice of the Czech Extraliga (ELH).

On July 9, 2012, Elkins signed a one-year, two-way contract with the Anaheim Ducks. During the 2012–13 season, Elkins was assigned to Ducks affiliates. On January 5, 2013, Elkins was granted a mutual release of his contract and returned to Europe in signing for the remainder of the year in Finland with HIFK of the SM-liiga.

Elkins played 5 seasons in the Liiga with HIFK, before concluding his tenure in Finland after the 2016–17 season. As a free agent, Elkins opted to return to North America, agreeing to a one-year AHL contract with the Grand Rapids Griffins on May 2, 2017. In his return to the AHL in the 2017–18 season, Elkins did not miss a game with the Griffins, contributing with 9 goals and 20 points in 76 games.

After a first-round exit in the post-season, Elkins left Grand Rapids as a free agent, agreeing to continue his career in Germany on a one-year contract with Grizzlys Wolfsburg of the DEL on May 14, 2018. During preparation with the Grizzlys for the 2018–19 campaign, Elkins suffered a long-term injury, forcing him out for the entirety of the season.

== Career statistics ==
=== Regular season and playoffs ===
			Regular season					Playoffs
Season	Team	League	GP	G	A	Pts	PIM	GP	G	A	Pts	PIM
2002–03	Detroit Compuware	NAHL	49	8	11	19	37	—	—	—	—	—
2003–04	St. Louis Heartland Eagles	USHL	57	12	17	29	36	—	—	—	—	—
2004–05	Sioux City Musketeers	USHL	58	19	23	42	27	13	4	1	5	8
2005–06	Ohio State University	CCHA	9	0	0	0	0	—	—	—	—	—
2006–07	Ohio State University	CCHA	26	7	7	14	10	—	—	—	—	—
2007–08	Ohio State University	CCHA	25	2	3	5	12	—	—	—	—	—
2008–09	Ohio State University	CCHA	42	18	23	41	18	—	—	—	—	—
2009–10	Manchester Monarchs	AHL	73	21	22	43	24	14	3	5	8	0
2009–10	Los Angeles Kings	NHL	3	1	0	1	0	—	—	—	—	—
2010–11	Manchester Monarchs	AHL	76	18	26	44	29	7	2	3	5	2
2011–12	HC Pardubice	CZE	26	6	7	13	24	5	2	2	4	0
2012–13	Norfolk Admirals	AHL	24	3	1	4	4	—	—	—	—	—
2012–13	Fort Wayne Komets	ECHL	4	3	3	6	0	—	—	—	—	—
2012–13	HIFK	FIN	10	3	2	5	2	8	3	2	5	4
2013–14	HIFK	FIN	54	15	25	40	24	2	0	1	1	0
2014–15	HIFK	FIN	60	10	21	31	28	1	0	0	0	0
2015–16	HIFK	FIN	58	10	20	30	16	18	7	4	11	6
2016–17	HIFK	FIN	41	4	19	23	55	14	2	5	7	8
2017–18	Grand Rapids Griffins	AHL	76	9	11	20	26	5	0	1	1	0
2019–20	Manglerud Star Ishockey	NOR
FIN totals			223	42	87	129	125	43	12	12	24	18
NHL totals			3	1	0	1	0	—	—	—	—	—
