= Jonathan Quick =

American ice hockey player (born 1986)

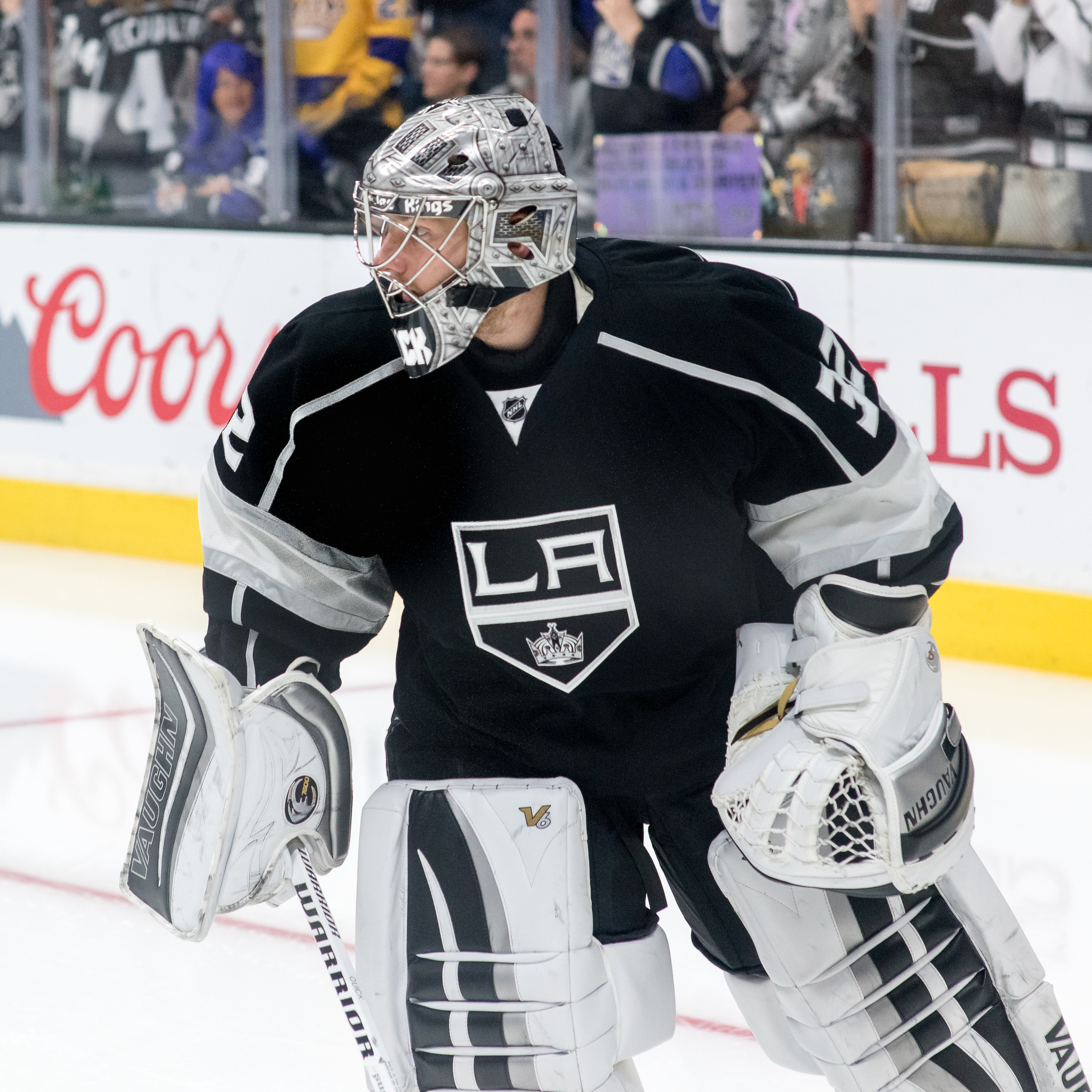
- Quick with the Los Angeles Kings during the 2016 Stanley Cup playoffs
- Born: January 21, 1986 (age 40) Milford, Connecticut, U.S.
- Height: 6 ft 1 in (185 cm)
- Weight: 218 lb (99 kg; 15 st 8 lb)
- Position: Goaltender
- Caught: Left
- Played for: Los Angeles Kings; Vegas Golden Knights; New York Rangers
- National team: United States
- NHL draft: 72nd overall, 2005; Los Angeles Kings
- Playing career: 2007–2026

Jonathan Douglas Quick (born January 21, 1986) is an American former professional ice hockey player. Playing as a goaltender, Quick was selected in the third round, 72nd overall, by the Los Angeles Kings at the 2005 NHL entry draft and spent most of his career with the franchise. He later played for the Vegas Golden Knights and the New York Rangers.

Quick is a two-time Vezina Trophy nominee and William M. Jennings Trophy winner and was a silver medalist with the United States at the 2010 Winter Olympics. Quick is a three-time Stanley Cup champion, having won with the Kings in 2012 and 2014 and the Vegas Golden Knights in 2023. Quick's Conn Smythe Trophy-winning run in the 2012 Stanley Cup playoffs has been described as the best statistical playoff run ever. In March 2024, Quick became the winningest American-born goaltender in NHL history, surpassing Ryan Miller. In February 2025, Quick became the first American-born goaltender to win 400 games.

== Playing career ==
=== Amateur ===
Quick played youth hockey for the Connecticut Yankees 1986 selects. He was teammates with Matt Lashoff, Rob Schremp, Bill Keenan, and Sean Backman.

Quick played in the 2000 Quebec International Pee-Wee Hockey Tournament with the New York Rangers minor ice hockey team. He later played for the Mid Fairfield youth hockey association out of Darien Ice Rink. He carried his team to win a national championship and he was single time during his midget major year. His team also featured forwards Sean Backman, John Mori and Augie DiMarzo, Joey Sides, Joe DeBello, Chris Davis and Cam Atkinson, all of whom went on to play professional hockey.

Quick played at Hamden High School in Hamden, Connecticut, before transferring to Avon Old Farms, where he was named to the 2002 New Haven Register All-Area Ice Hockey Team. Quick's number 32 Kings jersey is displayed in the Lou Astorino Ice Arena of Hamden. He led Avon Old Farms to two-straight New England Prep Championships in his junior and senior seasons. He had nine shutouts during his senior year.

Quick played collegiate hockey for the University of Massachusetts Amherst out of Hockey East (HE). As a freshman, he earned his first victory by a score of 4–2 on October 15, 2005, in his first start against Clarkson University. He also appeared in one playoff game as a freshman, which the Minutemen lost 4–1 to Boston University. Quick scored his first goal January 6, 2007, against Merrimack College. In the 4–2 win, the unassisted goal came during a delayed penalty into an empty net at 9:31 of the second period; it was the game-winning goal. While playing for the Minutemen, he led the team to their first-ever NCAA Men's Ice Hockey Championship appearance. In his first NCAA Tournament game, Quick shut-out Clarkson University, stopping all 33 shots he faced, in a 1–0 overtime victory. He appeared in five playoff games and posted a .944 save percentage.

=== Professional ===
==== Los Angeles Kings (2007–2023) ====
After losing in his first professional start, with the ECHL's Reading Royals, Quick made a statistically unlikely goal during a shutout in his second start, scoring an empty-net goal against the Pensacola Ice Pilots on October 27, 2007, at 19:25 in the third period.

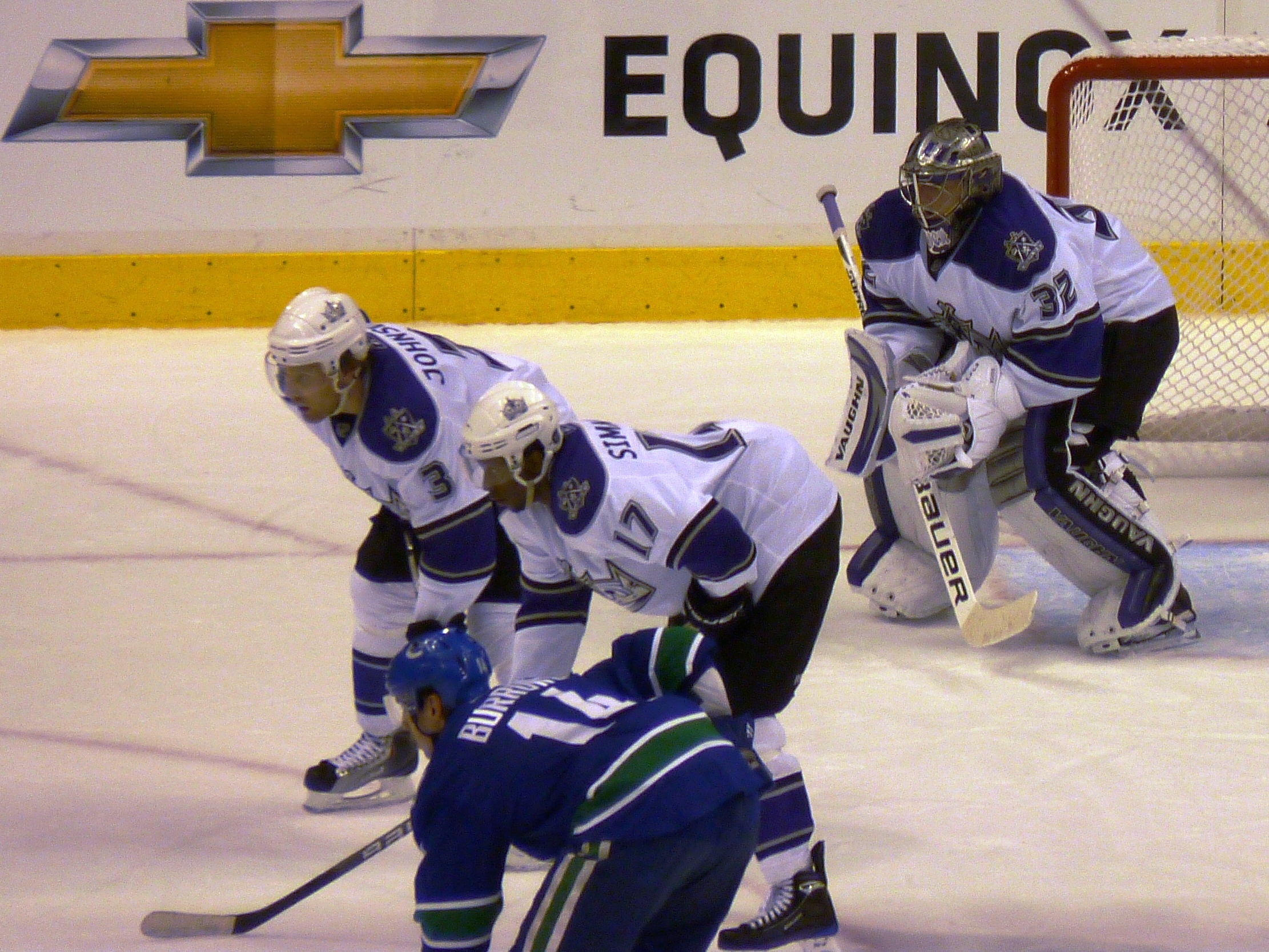
Quick in net for the Los Angeles Kings in April 2010 during the 2010 Stanley Cup playoffs, his first appearance in the NHL postseason.

Quick played his first NHL game on December 6, 2007, against the Buffalo Sabres in an 8–2 win.

He began the 2008–09 season with the Los Angeles Kings' American Hockey League (AHL) affiliate, the Manchester Monarchs, sharing time with Jonathan Bernier. He was called up to the Kings on December 16, 2008, after goaltender Erik Ersberg suffered a groin injury. He earned his first NHL shutout on December 23, defeating the Columbus Blue Jackets. He also received the NHL's Third Star of the Week honor for the week ending December 28. In three games, Quick posted a 2–1–0 record, with both victories coming via shutout, posting a 0.67 goals against average (GAA) and a .958 save percentage.

On February 9, 2009, he was awarded the First Star of the Week by the NHL after stopping 95 of 100 shots in a three-game road win streak, which launched the Kings back into the 2009 playoff picture. He finished the season with a 21–18–2 record, with a 2.48 GAA and .914 save percentage.

He earned his first Stanley Cup playoffs shutout on April 16, 2011, against the San Jose Sharks, stopping all 34 shots for a 4–0 shutout win.

On April 25, 2012, after the end of the 2011–12 season, Quick was nominated as a Vezina Trophy finalist, along with Henrik Lundqvist and Pekka Rinne, the former of which ultimately won the award. Quick was also named a 2011–12 NHL second team All-Star. He led the League with 10 shutouts (a Kings franchise record), had the NHL's second-lowest GAA (1.95) and posted a 35–21–13 final record. Quick gained much attention during the 2012 playoffs, as the eighth-seeded Kings defeated the back-to-back Presidents' Trophy-winning Vancouver Canucks in five games, followed by the Kings' first-ever four-game playoff series sweep, which came against the second-seeded St. Louis Blues.

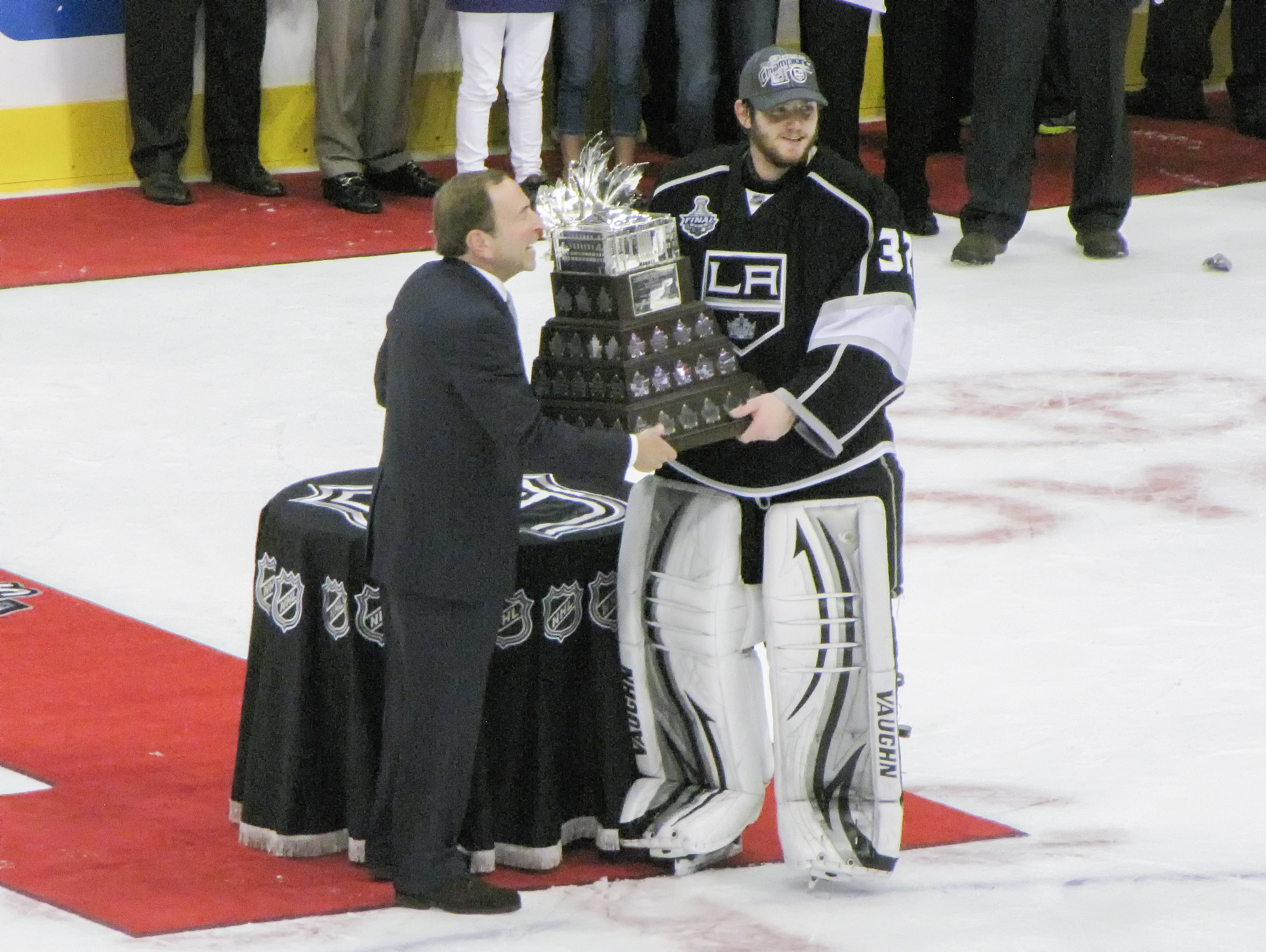
Quick was awarded the Conn Smythe Trophy by NHL commissioner Gary Bettman following the Kings' victory over the New Jersey Devils in the 2012 Stanley Cup Final.

On May 30, 2012, Quick set a new Stanley Cup playoff record after winning his 11th consecutive road game dating back to the 2011 postseason, surpassing the old mark of ten set by Billy Smith of the New York Islanders, and continued adding to the record. The streak ran from April 16, 2011, against San Jose to June 2, 2012, against the New Jersey Devils (12 games). Los Angeles qualified for the Stanley Cup Final for the second time in its 45-year history, and first time since the 1993 playoffs. The Kings ended their 19-year drought and made it to the 2012 Stanley Cup Final after defeating the third-seeded Phoenix Coyotes in the conference finals. Quick was awarded the Conn Smythe Trophy following the Kings' first Stanley Cup victory over the New Jersey Devils, 6–1, taking the series four games to two. Quick posted a 16–4 record with a 1.41 GAA, a .946 save percentage and three shutouts along the way.

On June 28, 2012, Quick signed a ten-year contract extension that would last until the end of the 2022–23 season. In November 2012, with the NHL in an ongoing lockout, Quick joined the AHL's Manchester Monarchs to continue rehabilitation from an off-season back surgery.

Quick won his second Stanley Cup on June 13, 2014, after the Kings defeated the New York Rangers. He had two playoff shutouts, including one in game three of the 2014 Stanley Cup Final against the New York Rangers, while also posting a save percentage of .911. Following the 2013–14 season, Quick was awarded the William M. Jennings Trophy, which is presented annually "to the goalkeeper(s) having played a minimum of 25 games for the team with the fewest goals scored against it." Because Ben Scrivens and Martin Jones had not played the required number of games to qualify as co-recipients of the honor, Quick was named the sole winner of the trophy. Over the course of the season, Quick had compiled a 27–17–4 record with a 2.07 GAA, .915 save percentage and six shutouts in 49 appearances.

On October 16, 2014, Quick posted 43 saves on all 43 shots he faced in a 1–0 shootout victory over the St. Louis Blues. It was Quick's largest save percentage in a shootout win to date. On October 23, Quick surpassed Rogie Vachon as the Kings' all-time leader in shutouts by earning his 33rd after a 2–0 victory over the Buffalo Sabres. In the 2014–15 season, Quick would go on to play 72 games, starting 71 of them. Quick would finish with a record of 36–22–13, with a GAA of 2.24 and a save percentage of .918 and six shutouts. The defending Stanley Cup champion Kings would go on to miss the playoffs, losing the last playoff spot to the Calgary Flames by just two points.

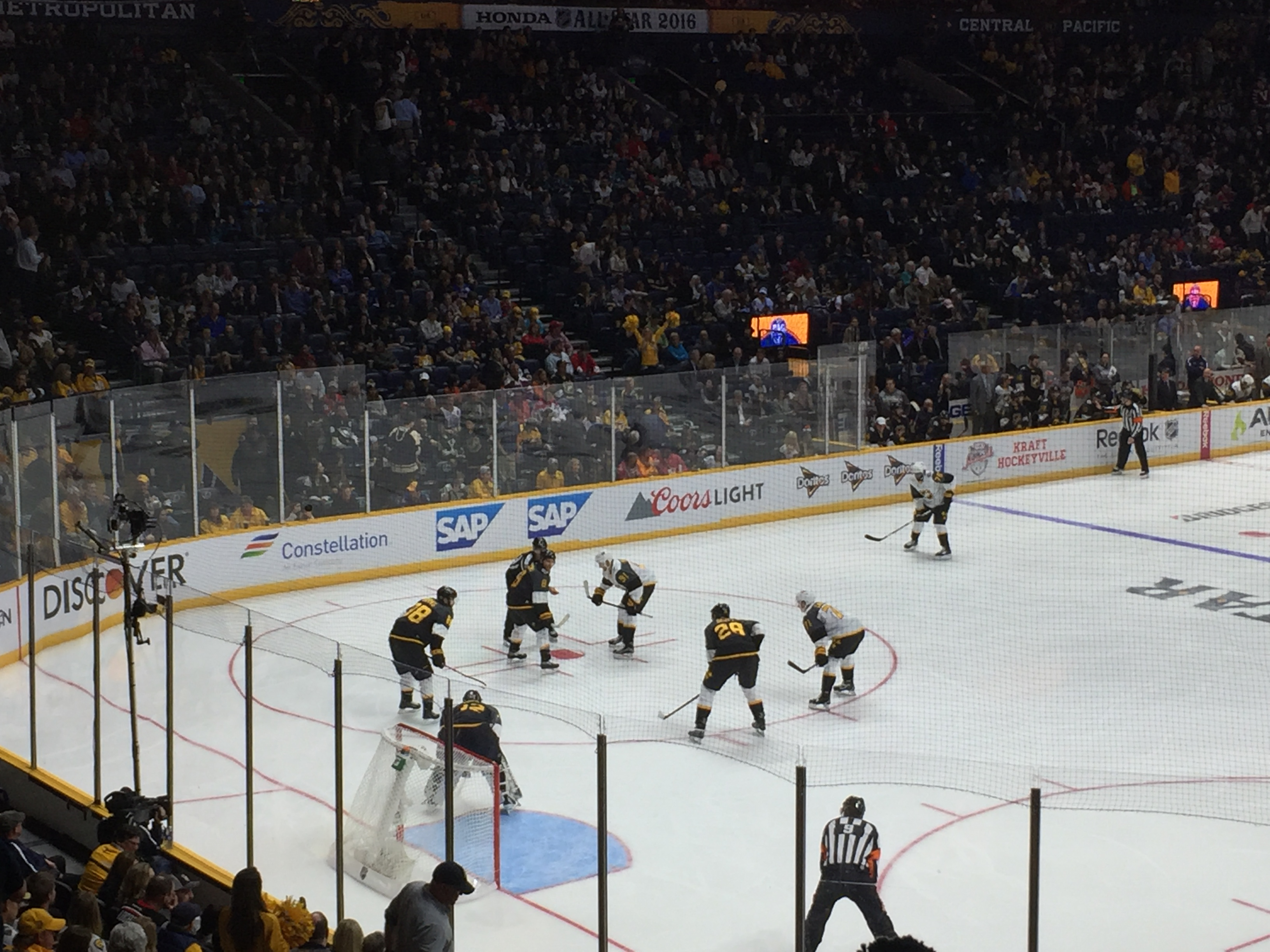
Quick in net for the Pacific Division during the 2016 NHL All-Star Game.

Quick was in goal as the Kings shut out the Chicago Blackhawks 5–0 on March 14, 2016, making Quick the all-time leader in shutouts of American-born goaltenders. On April 27, Quick was nominated for the Vezina Trophy, awarded to the league's best goaltender, for the second time which ultimately went to Washington Capitals goaltender Braden Holtby.

During the 2016–17 season, Quick suffered a lower-body injury in the season's first game on October 12, 2016, against the San Jose Sharks. He chose to not undergo surgery. Quick was out for four and a half months (59 games in all) and returned with the team on February 25, 2017, in a 4–1 victory over the Anaheim Ducks.

Quick was invited to the 2018 NHL All-Star Game, but declined the invitation due to a nagging injury. Per NHL policy, any player who declines an All-Star invitation is required to sit out the next regular season game, leading Quick to miss the Kings' first game back, which took place on January 30, 2018. At the conclusion of the regular season, Quick was awarded his second Jennings Trophy, for allowing the fewest goals against all season. Quick helped the Kings qualify for the 2018 playoffs as the seventh seed in the Western Conference, where they were swept by the Vegas Golden Knights. Quick was impressive, however, allowing only seven goals over the four games, posting a 1.55 GAA and a .947 SV %.

On May 8, 2022, Quick recorded his 10th NHL playoff shutout in 4–0 victory over the Edmonton Oilers in the first round of the 2022 playoffs, surpassing Mike Richter for first place among American goaltenders in that category.

Midway through the 2022–23 season, Quick's performance was in question. With Pheonix Copley taking over starting duties by the new year, a trade seemed inevitable. Quick started his last game as a King on February 26, 2023, a 5–2 loss against the New York Rangers.

==== Vegas Golden Knights (2023) ====
On March 1, 2023, Quick was traded to the Columbus Blue Jackets along with a conditional 2023 first-round pick and a 2024 third-round pick in exchange for Vladislav Gavrikov and Joonas Korpisalo. One day later, however, Columbus traded Quick to the Vegas Golden Knights in exchange for Michael Hutchinson and a 2025 seventh-round pick. The Golden Knights sought to acquire Quick due to a rash of injuries to other goaltenders in the organization, including the season's original starter Logan Thompson and regular backup Laurent Brossoit.

Quick made his first start for Vegas, and his first non-Kings NHL start, on March 5, 2023, stopping 25 of 28 shots in a 4–3 victory over the Montreal Canadiens. He won his 375th NHL game on March 21, surpassing John Vanbiesbrouck for the second-most wins by an American goaltender in league history, behind only Ryan Miller. Quick won five of his first six games in net with the team, and finished the regular season with a 5–2–2 record and .901 save percentage with the Golden Knights.

Vegas finished first in the Western Conference and qualified to the 2023 Stanley Cup playoffs, but with Brossoit returning and Adin Hill serving as backup, Quick initially watched from the press box. However, following Brossoit's injury midway through the second round series against the Edmonton Oilers, Quick dressed as backup goaltender behind Hill. He remained in this position through the Golden Knights' deep run to the 2023 Stanley Cup Final against the Florida Panthers. While not taking the ice, coach Bruce Cassidy praised him for his work ethic and supportive role to the team. The Golden Knights defeated the Panthers in five games, and Quick hoisted the Stanley Cup for the third time, receiving it from former Kings teammate Alec Martinez.

==== New York Rangers (2023–2026) ====
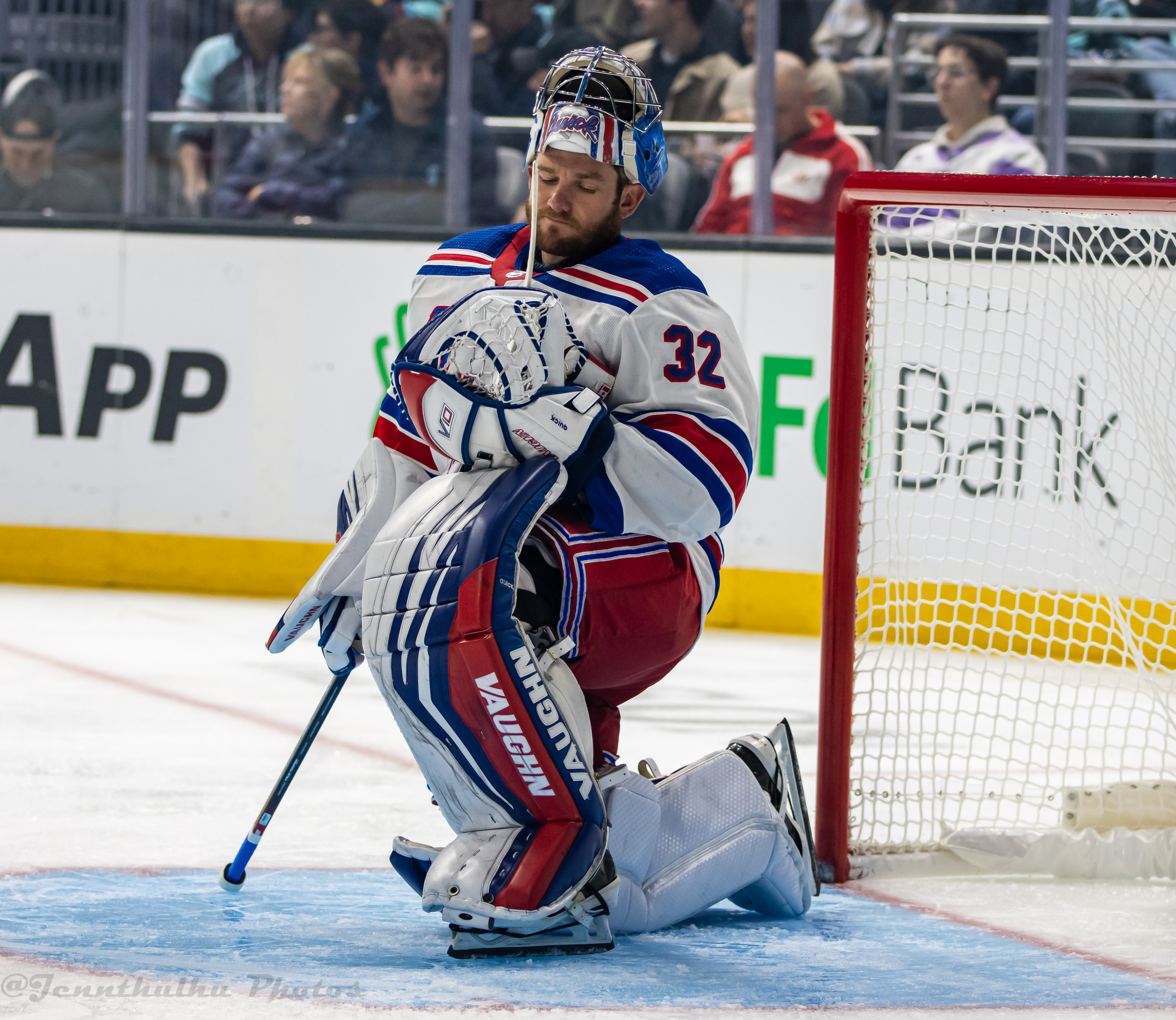
Quick with the New York Rangers in October 2023

Having concluded his contract with the Golden Knights, Quick signed as a free agent to a one-year, $925,000 contract with the New York Rangers for the 2023–24 season on July 1, 2023. Quick admitted that until the Kings traded him away, he thought he "was going to be retiring a King". Having lost the opportunity to spend his entire career with the Los Angeles Kings, and finding out that he enjoyed his backup role while with Vegas, he decided to take the opportunity to sign with the Rangers, the team he had grown up watching as a child in Connecticut and gone on to defeat in the 2014 Stanley Cup Final, to serve as the backup to New York's starter, Igor Shesterkin.

Quick started his first game with the Rangers on October 21, a 4–1 win over the Seattle Kraken. On November 22, Quick recorded his 60th NHL shutout in a 1–0 win over the Pittsburgh Penguins. On March 3, 2024, he was signed to a one-year contract extension by the Rangers. On March 30, during a game against the Arizona Coyotes, Quick earned his 392nd NHL win and became the all-time leader in wins among American-born goaltenders. He would later win his 400th NHL game against his former team, the Golden Knights on February 2, 2025.

On March 10, 2026, Quick recorded the 65th shutout of his NHL career in a 4–0 win against the Calgary Flames, and passed Lundqvist for 17th in all-time list. On April 13, Quick announced that he would retire at the end of the regular season, with his start against the Florida Panthers on that same day being the last one of his career. In his last game, Quick made 14 saves in New York's 3–2 loss.

== International play ==
Medal record

Men's ice hockey

Representing the United States

Winter Olympics
Silver medal – second place	2010 Vancouver	

On January 1, 2010, Quick was named to the United States senior team for the 2010 Winter Olympics as the team's third goaltender. He received a silver medal after the United States lost to Canada 3–2 in the gold medal game.

After his selection to United States team for the 2014 Winter Olympics, head coach Dan Bylsma named Quick the team's starting goaltender over teammates Ryan Miller and Jimmy Howard. He would go on to start in five out of six team's games (Miller would start the other). The United States did not medal, while Quick finished the tournament with a 3–2 record, a 2.17 GAA and a .923 save percentage.

== Personal life ==
Quick is married to Jaclyn (née Backman); they have a daughter and a son together. Jaclyn's sister Alicia is married to former NHL forward Matt Moulson.

Quick was born in Milford, Connecticut, and raised in nearby Hamden. He attended Hamden High School until transferring to Avon Old Farms, a preparatory school known for its ice hockey program. His family still resides in Hamden today. Ray and Mike's Deli in Hamden named the "Quickwich" sandwich in Quick's honor after his 2012 Stanley Cup victory.

== Career statistics ==
=== Regular season and playoffs ===
			Regular season									Playoffs
Season	Team	League	GP	W	L	T/OT	MIN	GA	SO	GAA	SV%	GP	W	L	MIN	GA	SO	GAA	SV%
2002–03	Avon Old Farms	USHS	13	8	5	0	780	38	0	2.92	.910	—	—	—	—	—	—	—	—
2003–04	Avon Old Farms	USHS	21	20	1	0	1,317	41	2	1.71	.933	3	3	0	184	7	0	2.05	.909
2004–05	Avon Old Farms	USHS	27	25	2	0	1,574	32	9	1.14	.956	3	3	0	162	1	2	0.33	.987
2005–06	U. of Massachusetts-Amherst	HE	17	4	10	1	905	45	0	2.98	.920	—	—	—	—	—	—	—	—
2006–07	U. of Massachusetts-Amherst	HE	37	19	12	5	2,224	80	3	2.16	.929	—	—	—	—	—	—	—	—
2007–08	Reading Royals	ECHL	38	23	11	3	2,257	105	1	2.79	.905	—	—	—	—	—	—	—	—
2007–08	Manchester Monarchs	AHL	19	11	8	0	1,085	42	3	2.32	.922	1	0	1	59	1	0	1.02	.974
2007–08	Los Angeles Kings	NHL	3	1	2	0	141	9	0	3.84	.855	—	—	—	—	—	—	—	—
2008–09	Manchester Monarchs	AHL	14	6	5	2	827	37	0	2.68	.919	—	—	—	—	—	—	—	—
2008–09	Los Angeles Kings	NHL	44	21	18	2	2,495	103	4	2.48	.914	—	—	—	—	—	—	—	—
2009–10	Los Angeles Kings	NHL	72	39	24	7	4,258	180	4	2.54	.907	6	2	4	360	21	0	3.50	.884
2010–11	Los Angeles Kings	NHL	61	35	22	3	3,591	134	6	2.24	.918	6	2	4	380	20	1	3.16	.913
2011–12	Los Angeles Kings	NHL	69	35	21	13	4,099	133	10	1.95	.929	20	16	4	1,238	28	3	1.41	.946
2012–13	Los Angeles Kings	NHL	37	18	13	4	2,134	87	1	2.45	.902	18	9	9	1.099	34	3	1.86	.934
2013–14	Los Angeles Kings	NHL	49	27	17	4	2,904	100	6	2.07	.915	26	16	10	1,605	69	2	2.58	.911
2014–15	Los Angeles Kings	NHL	72	36	22	13	4,184	156	6	2.24	.918	—	—	—	—	—	—	—	—
2015–16	Los Angeles Kings	NHL	68	40	23	5	4,034	149	5	2.22	.918	5	1	4	296	15	0	3.04	.886
2016–17	Los Angeles Kings	NHL	17	8	5	2	931	35	2	2.26	.917	—	—	—	—	—	—	—	—
2017–18	Los Angeles Kings	NHL	64	33	28	3	3,677	147	5	2.40	.921	4	0	4	271	7	0	1.55	.947
2018–19	Los Angeles Kings	NHL	46	16	23	7	2,648	149	2	3.38	.888	—	—	—	—	—	—	—	—
2019–20	Los Angeles Kings	NHL	42	16	22	4	2,517	117	1	2.79	.904	—	—	—	—	—	—	—	—
2020–21	Los Angeles Kings	NHL	22	11	9	2	1,219	58	2	2.86	.898	—	—	—	—	—	—	—	—
2021–22	Los Angeles Kings	NHL	46	23	13	9	2,686	116	2	2.59	.910	7	3	4	385	22	1	3.43	.904
2022–23	Los Angeles Kings	NHL	31	11	13	4	1,698	99	1	3.50	.876	—	—	—	—	—	—	—	—
2022–23	Vegas Golden Knights	NHL	10	5	2	2	536	28	1	3.13	.901	—	—	—	—	—	—	—	—
2023–24	New York Rangers	NHL	27	18	6	2	1,583	69	2	2.62	.911	—	—	—	—	—	—	—	—
2024–25	New York Rangers	NHL	24	11	7	2	1,326	70	3	3.17	.893	—	—	—	—	—	—	—	—
2025–26	New York Rangers	NHL	25	6	17	2	1,418	73	2	3.09	.891	—	—	—	—	—	—	—	—
NHL totals			829	410	307	90	48,079	2,012	65	2.51	.910	92	49	43	5,635	217	10	2.31	.921

=== International ===
Year	Team	Event	Result	GP	W	L	T	MIN	GA	SO	GAA	SV%
2010	United States	OG	2nd place, silver medalist(s)	—	—	—	—	—	—	—	—	—
2014	United States	OG	4th	5	3	2	0	304	11	0	2.17	.923
2016	United States	WCH	7th	2	0	2	0	118	7	0	3.56	.863
Senior totals				7	3	4	0	422	18	0	2.55	.907

== Awards and honors ==
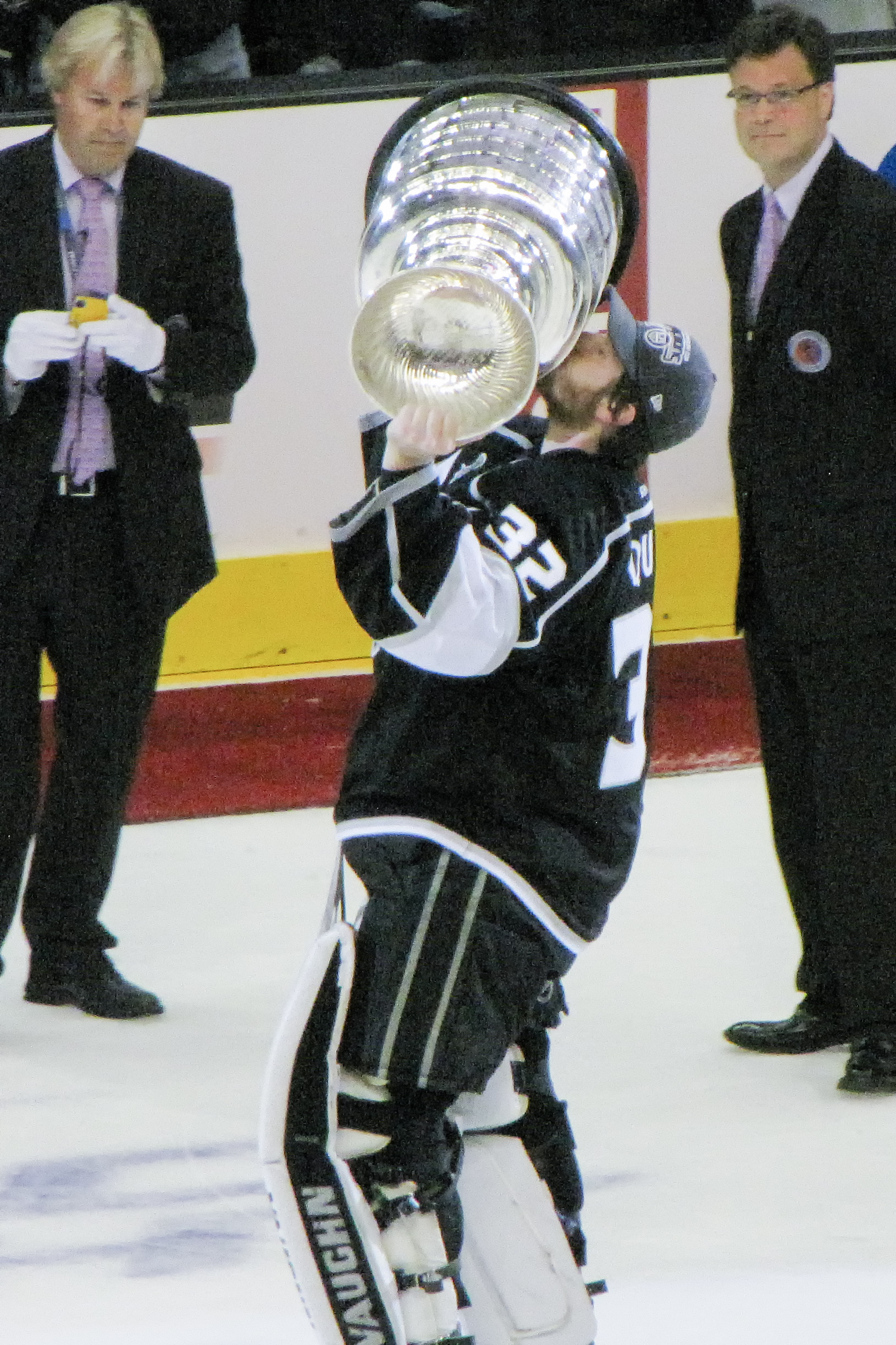
Quick celebrates with the Stanley Cup in 2012 with the Kings.

Award	Year
College
All-Hockey East second team	2007
AHCA East second team All-American	2007
NHL
NHL All-Star Game	2012, 2016, 2018
Stanley Cup champion	2012, 2014, 2023
Conn Smythe Trophy	2012
NHL second All-Star team	2012
William M. Jennings Trophy	2014, 2018
Other
Best NHL Player ESPY Award	2012

NHL records

- Highest save percentage in a single playoff season – .946 (2011–12)

== See also ==
- List of NHL goaltenders with 300 wins

Awards
Preceded by Tim Thomas	Winner of the Conn Smythe Trophy; 2012	Succeeded by Patrick Kane
Preceded by Tim Thomas	Best NHL Player ESPY Award; 2012	Succeeded by Sidney Crosby
Preceded by Corey Crawford and Ray Emery; Braden Holtby	Winner of the William M. Jennings Trophy; 2014; 2018	Succeeded by Corey Crawford and Carey Price; Thomas Greiss and Robin Lehner
