= Pheonix Copley =

American ice hockey player (born 1992)

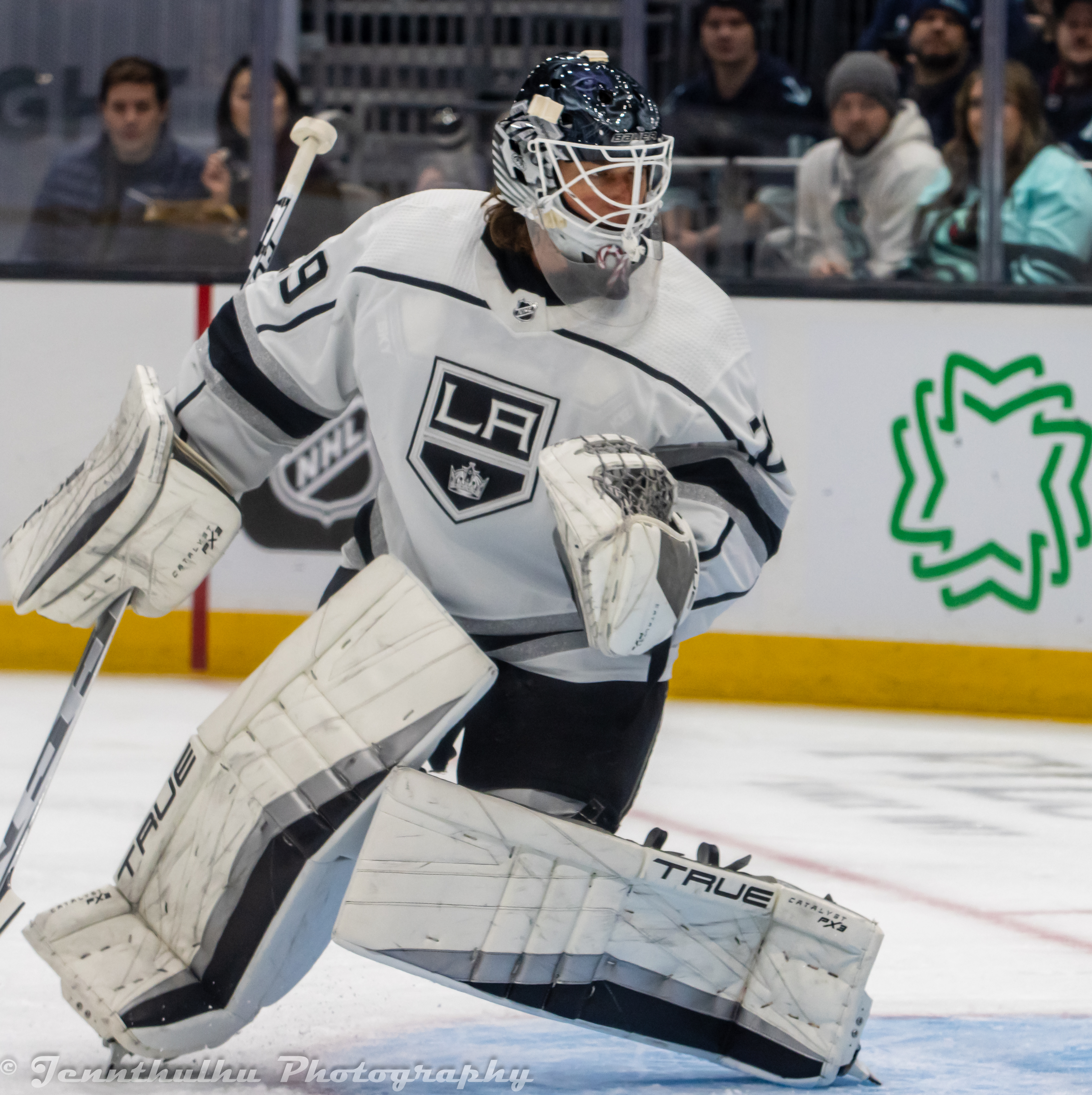
- Copley with the Los Angeles Kings in 2023
- Born: January 18, 1992 (age 34) North Pole, Alaska, U.S.
- Height: 6 ft 4 in (193 cm)
- Weight: 196 lb (89 kg; 14 st 0 lb)
- Position: Goaltender
- Catches: Left
- NHL team (P) Cur. team Former teams: Columbus Blue Jackets; Cleveland Monsters (AHL); St. Louis Blues; Washington Capitals; Los Angeles Kings
- NHL draft: Undrafted
- Playing career: 2014–present

Pheonix Copley (born January 18, 1992) is an American professional ice hockey player who is a goaltender for the Cleveland Monsters of the American Hockey League (AHL) while under contract to the Columbus Blue Jackets of the National Hockey League (NHL).

== Playing career ==
=== USHL and college ===
Undrafted, Copley played in the United States Hockey League (USHL) with the Tri-City Storm and Des Moines Buccaneers before committing to play collegiate hockey with Michigan Tech of the Western Collegiate Hockey Association (WCHA). At the conclusion of his sophomore season, Copley opted to turn professional, agreeing to a two-year, entry-level contract with the Washington Capitals on March 20, 2014.

=== St. Louis Blues and Washington Capitals ===
Copley was assigned to AHL affiliate, the Hershey Bears, to begin his first full professional season in 2014–15. In sharing the crease, he impressed with the Bears, earning 17 wins in 26 games. In the off-season, Copley was included in a trade, which also included Troy Brouwer and a third-round pick in 2016, to the St. Louis Blues in exchange for T. J. Oshie on July 2, 2015.

In the 2015–16 season, Copley made his NHL debut with the Blues in relief in a defeat to the Nashville Predators on February 27, 2016.

During the 2016–17 season, on January 20, 2017, Copley was recalled from the Chicago Wolves of the AHL by the Blues. He made the first start of his NHL career on January 21 against the Winnipeg Jets, where the Blues lost 5–3. After he was returned to the Wolves, on February 27, 2017, Copley was traded back to the Capitals in a deadline trade along with Kevin Shattenkirk in exchange for Zach Sanford, Brad Malone, a 2017 first-round pick, and a conditional second-round pick in 2019. Copley was called up to the NHL during the Capitals' 2018 Stanley Cup playoffs run and although he did not play during the playoffs, he stayed with the team as they won the 2018 Stanley Cup.

Copley made the Capitals opening-night roster to begin the 2018–19 season. He recorded his first NHL win in a 4–3 shootout win over the Calgary Flames on October 27, 2018. He spent the 2019–20 and 2020–21 seasons with the Hershey Bears, where he earned the Harry "Hap" Holmes Memorial Award with Zachary Fucale for the 2020–21 season's best save percentage.

=== Los Angeles Kings ===
As a free agent following the 2021–22 season, Copley signed a one-year, $850,000 contract with the Los Angeles Kings on July 13, 2022. After Kings goaltenders Cal Petersen and Jonathan Quick struggled at the start of the 2022–23 season, the Kings called up Copley from the AHL in December 2022. Copley would quickly establish himself as the team's starting goaltender, becoming just the fifth goaltender in franchise history to win seven games in a row.

During the 2023–24 season, Copley played in eight games before sustaining an injury during practice on December 15, 2023, and was then placed on the long-term injured reserve list two days later. On January 6, 2024, it was announced that he would not return during the season due to ACL surgery.

Ahead of the 2025–26 season, on October 1, 2025, Copley was placed on waivers by the Kings; he was subsequently claimed off waivers the following day by the Tampa Bay Lightning. Remaining on the roster to provide depth, Copley without featuring with Tampa Bay was later returned to the Kings in a trade for future considerations on October 15, 2025.

=== Columbus Blue Jackets ===
As a free agent from the Kings, Copley was signed to a one-year, $850,000 contract with the Columbus Blue Jackets for the 2026–27 season on July 1, 2026.

== Personal life ==
Copley was born on January 18, 1992, in North Pole, Alaska, to parents Peter Copley and Mary Sanford. His older brother Navarone also plays ice hockey. At a young age, his family moved to Ohio so his father could pursue an advanced degree. Eventually, his parents divorced and Mary, Navarone and Pheonix moved back to Alaska. In honor of his birthplace, Copley has candy canes on his goaltender mask.

In 2022, spurred by difficulties related to diet and injuries, Copley founded an athletic tea company called Athletes Apothecary.

In 2025, Copley became a minority owner of drink powder brand Sport Drink. In 2026, following attention towards Sport Drink's social media advertising, including a post apparently mocking a transgender minor's suicide, Copley made a statement distancing himself from the company without announcing a divestment.

== Career statistics ==
			Regular season									Playoffs
Season	Team	League	GP	W	L	T/OT	MIN	GA	SO	GAA	SV%	GP	W	L	MIN	GA	SO	GAA	SV%
2009–10	Southern California Titans	NAPHL	10	6	1	1	429	22	0	3.08	.871	—	—	—	—	—	—	—	—
2010–11	Corpus Christi IceRays	NAHL	42	14	23	4	2,376	165	0	4.17	.880	—	—	—	—	—	—	—	—
2011–12	Tri-City Storm	USHL	25	9	13	0	1,451	76	2	3.14	.905	—	—	—	—	—	—	—	—
2011–12	Des Moines Buccaneers	USHL	20	7	11	1	1,163	60	0	3.09	.909	—	—	—	—	—	—	—	—
2012–13	Michigan Tech	WCHA	24	8	15	1	1,322	71	3	3.22	.900	—	—	—	—	—	—	—	—
2013–14	Michigan Tech	WCHA	30	10	13	6	1,724	72	1	2.51	.911	—	—	—	—	—	—	—	—
2013–14	South Carolina Stingrays	ECHL	3	2	1	0	147	8	0	3.26	.906	1	0	1	70	3	0	2.58	.923
2014–15	Hershey Bears	AHL	26	17	4	3	1,520	55	3	2.17	.925	5	3	1	229	7	0	1.83	.946
2015–16	Chicago Wolves	AHL	37	15	16	3	2,088	97	3	2.79	.909	—	—	—	—	—	—	—	—
2015–16	St. Louis Blues	NHL	1	0	0	0	24	1	0	2.50	.833	—	—	—	—	—	—	—	—
2016–17	Chicago Wolves	AHL	25	15	6	2	1,452	56	1	2.31	.920	—	—	—	—	—	—	—	—
2016–17	St. Louis Blues	NHL	1	0	1	0	59	5	0	5.09	.828	—	—	—	—	—	—	—	—
2016–17	Hershey Bears	AHL	16	11	5	0	920	33	0	2.15	.931	9	5	4	534	19	1	2.13	.933
2017–18	Hershey Bears	AHL	41	15	17	6	2,184	106	2	2.91	.896	—	—	—	—	—	—	—	—
2018–19	Washington Capitals	NHL	27	16	7	3	1,529	74	1	2.90	.905	—	—	—	—	—	—	—	—
2019–20	Hershey Bears	AHL	31	17	8	6	1,868	77	2	2.47	.905	—	—	—	—	—	—	—	—
2020–21	Hershey Bears	AHL	15	10	4	1	902	40	2	2.66	.896	—	—	—	—	—	—	—	—
2021–22	Hershey Bears	AHL	35	18	12	5	2,114	84	2	2.38	.913	3	1	2	184	7	0	2.29	.929
2021–22	Washington Capitals	NHL	2	0	1	0	97	5	0	3.11	.878	—	—	—	—	—	—	—	—
2022–23	Ontario Reign	AHL	11	6	4	1	630	26	0	2.48	.913	—	—	—	—	—	—	—	—
2022–23	Los Angeles Kings	NHL	37	24	6	3	2,090	92	1	2.64	.902	1	0	0	29	2	0	4.26	.750
2023–24	Los Angeles Kings	NHL	8	4	1	2	436	23	1	3.16	.870	—	—	—	—	—	—	—	—
2024–25	Ontario Reign	AHL	42	24	17	1	2,430	101	2	2.49	.904	2	0	2	117	4	0	2.05	.920
2024–25	Los Angeles Kings	NHL	1	0	0	0	27	2	0	4.37	.833	—	—	—	—	—	—	—	—
2025–26	Ontario Reign	AHL	33	21	11	1	1,971	85	1	2.59	.901	2	1	1	117	5	0	2.57	.924
2025–26	Los Angeles Kings	NHL	1	0	1	0	58	3	0	3.07	.893	—	—	—	—	—	—	—	—
NHL totals			78	44	17	8	4,320	205	3	2.85	.898	1	0	0	29	2	0	4.26	.750
