= Erik Ersberg =

Swedish ice hockey player (born 1982)

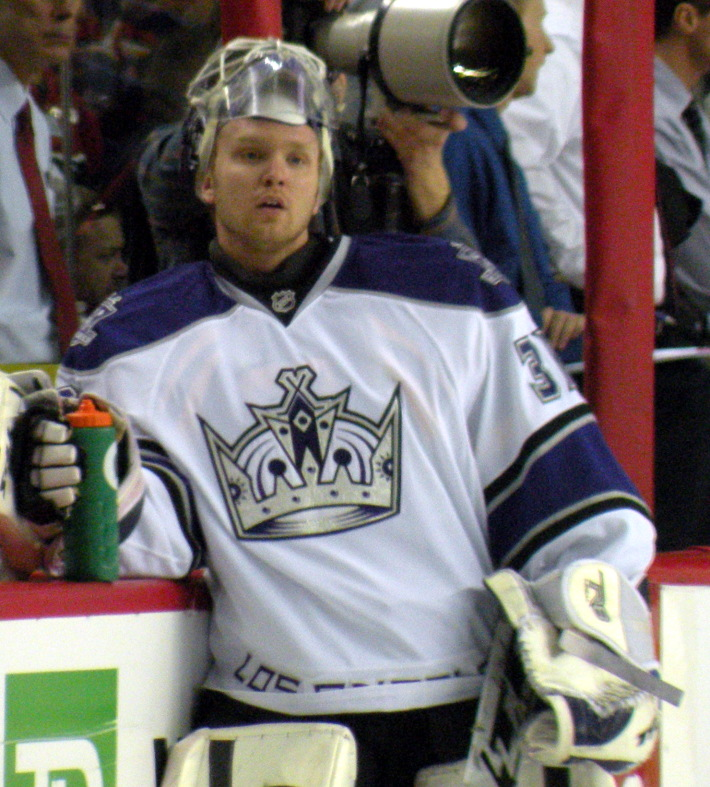
- Erik Ersberg during a National Hockey League game for the Los Angeles Kings against the Calgary Flames in Calgary in April 2009.
- Born: March 8, 1982 (age 44) Sala, Sweden
- Height: 6 ft 0 in (183 cm)
- Weight: 170 lb (77 kg; 12 st 2 lb)
- Position: Goaltender
- Caught: Left
- Played for: HV71; Los Angeles Kings; Salavat Yulaev Ufa; HC Donbass; Iserlohn Roosters
- National team: Sweden
- NHL draft: Undrafted
- Playing career: 2001–2016

Erik Ersberg (born March 8, 1982) is a Swedish retired professional ice hockey goaltender. During his playing career, he made a total of 54 appearances in the National Hockey League with the Los Angeles Kings. He is currently serving as the goaltending coach to the Vienna Capitals of the Austrian Hockey League (EBEL).

== Playing career ==
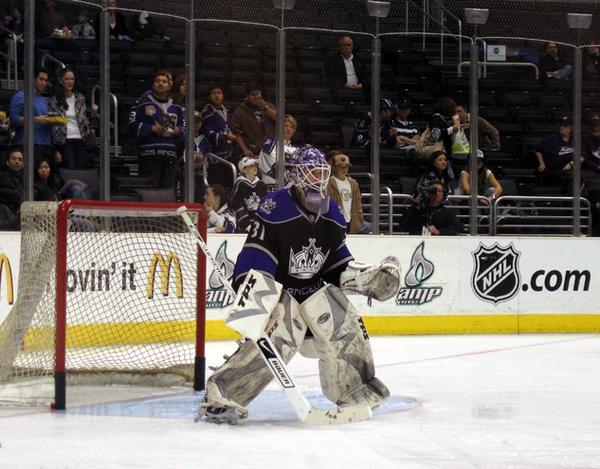
Ersberg in action

Ersberg started his ice hockey career playing for VIK Västerås HK in HockeyAllsvenskan (tier two in the Swedish league structure). For season 2005–06 he joined the Jönköping based elite club HV71. As a backup goalie behind Stefan Liv, Ersberg guarded the net for ten games in his rookie season, ending the regular season with a save percentage of .929. In the Elitserien playoffs 2006 he played in two games with a .857 save percentage.

The following season he got his breakthrough and became starting goaltender for HV71 and was also selected for the Sweden national team in the 2006 Karjala Tournament and Channel One Cup. He is somewhat of a late bloomer as he has never before played for the national team, including youth and junior tournaments. In season 2006–07 he was nominated as the second candidate for the title Elitserien Rookie of the Year. On March 22, 2007 he was awarded the Honken Trophy, which is awarded to the Swedish goaltender of the year. On May 31, 2007, Los Angeles announced on their web site that they have signed Ersberg to a one-year entry-level deal. He started the 2007–08 season playing for Manchester Monarchs in the American Hockey League.

On February 21, 2008, the Kings recalled Ersberg from Manchester, becoming the first Swedish-born goaltender in Los Angeles Kings franchise history.

February 23, 2008, Ersberg made his NHL debut against the Chicago Blackhawks at Staples Center in Los Angeles, California. He replaced Dan Cloutier, who was pulled in the second period with the score 5-1. The Kings scored four goals in the third period to tie the game 5-5 and send it into overtime, where the Blackhawks scored for the 6-5 victory. Ersberg allowed only one goal on 19 shots, but earned the overtime loss.

On March 6, 2008, Ersberg recorded his first career NHL win and shutout. He made 40 saves to defeat the Ottawa Senators 2-0. Ersberg became the first NHL rookie to make at least 40 saves in a shutout since November 14, 1996. He also broke the Kings' franchise single game record for saves by a rookie, breaking Gary Edwards' previous mark of 38 saves during the 1971–72 season.

For the 2010–11 season, Ersberg was assigned to the Manchester Monarchs. He proceed to leave the team without permission and on October 22, 2010, Ersberg was placed on waivers. After clearing waivers two days later he had his contract terminated by the Kings for violating his contract. He has since been playing for the Russian club Salavat Yulaev in KHL, before moving on to fellow KHL side Donbass Donetsk. After spending the 2013–14 season in Germany, representing the Iserlohn Roosters, Ersberg returned to Sweden and spent two years with HV71 of the Swedish Hockey League (SHL). He announced his retirement in July 2016.

== International play ==
Medal record

Representing Sweden

Ice hockey

World Championships
Silver medal – second place	2011 Slovakia	

Ersberg made his international debut for Sweden in a single game at the 2007 World Championships. He later competed in two games at the 2011 World Championships, helping claim the silver medal.

== Career statistics ==
=== Regular season and playoffs ===
			Regular season									Playoffs
Season	Team	League	GP	W	L	T/OT	MIN	GA	SO	GAA	SV%	GP	W	L	MIN	GA	SO	GAA	SV%
2001–02	Västerås IK Ungdom	Div.1	37	—	—	—	—	—	—	—	.930	10	—	—	—	—	—	2.19	.919
2002–03	Västerås IK Ungdom	Allsv	32	—	—	—	—	91	1	2.84	.901	—	—	—	—	—	—	—	—
2003–04	Västerås IK Ungdom	Allsv	20	—	—	—	—	79	3	2.45	.914	—	—	—	—	—	—	—	—
2004–05	Västerås IK Ungdom	Allsv	37	—	—	—	—	76	3	2.08	.909	5	—	—	—	—	—	1.56	.946
2005–06	HV71	SEL	10	7	2	1	601	18	2	1.79	.929	2	0	2	78	4	0	3.05	.857
2005–06	VIK Västerås HK	Allsv	2	—	—	—	—	4	0	2.02	.913	—	—	—	—	—	—	—	—
2006–07	HV71	SEL	41	22	12	7	2455	98	4	2.39	.908	14	7	7	776	35	0	2.81	.888
2007–08	Manchester Monarchs	AHL	30	10	13	2	1540	75	1	2.92	.897	—	—	—	—	—	—	—	—
2007–08	Los Angeles Kings	NHL	14	6	5	3	798	33	2	2.48	.927	—	—	—	—	—	—	—	—
2008–09	Los Angeles Kings	NHL	28	8	11	5	1477	65	0	2.64	.900	—	—	—	—	—	—	—	—
2009–10	Los Angeles Kings	NHL	11	4	3	2	551	22	0	2.40	.906	1	0	0	13	2	0	9.23	.500
2010–11	Manchester Monarchs	AHL	2	1	1	0	119	4	0	2.02	.926	—	—	—	—	—	—	—	—
2010–11	Salavat Yulaev Ufa	KHL	18	11	5	1	991	35	4	2.12	.926	20	—	—	1118	36	3	1.93	.933
2011–12	Salavat Yulaev Ufa	KHL	24	11	5	4	1363	56	3	2.47	.921	6	2	4	367	13	1	2.13	.920
2012–13	HC Donbass	KHL	21	5	10	6	1247	55	1	2.64	.912	—	—	—	—	—	—	—	—
2013–14	Iserlohn Roosters	DEL	24	10	12	2	1298	54	3	2.50	.921	4	1	3	235	11	0	2.81	.925
2014–15	HV71	SHL	17	9	8	0	926	36	1	2.33	.907	—	—	—	—	—	—	—	—
2015–16	HV71	SHL	13	5	6	0	653	36	0	3.31	.897	—	—	—	—	—	—	—	—
NHL totals			53	18	19	10	2827	120	2	2.55	.910	1	0	0	13	2	0	9.23	.500

=== International ===
Year	Team	Event	Result	GP	W	L	T	MIN	GA	SO	GAA	SV%
2007	Sweden	WC	4th	1	0	1	0	59	4	0	4.06	.871
2011	Sweden	WC	2nd place, silver medalist(s)	2	0	2	0	125	8	0	3.84	.904
Senior totals				3	0	3	0	184	12	0	3.92	.897

Statistics complete.

== Awards and honors ==
Award	Year
SHL
Honken Trophy (Swedish Goaltender of the Year)	2007
Rookie of the Year nominee	2007
KHL
First All-Star Team	2011
Gagarin Cup (Salavat Yulaev Ufa)	2011
