= 2015–16 Toronto Marlies season =

2015–16 Toronto Marlies
- AHL Regular Season champions
- Eastern Conference champions
- North Division champions
- League: 1st AHL
- Division: 1st North
- Conference: 1st Eastern
- 2015–16 record: 54-16-5-1 (114 pts)
- Home record: 27-9-2 (56 pts)
- Road record: 27-7-4 (58 pts)
- Goals for: 294
- Goals against: 191

Team information
- General manager: Kyle Dubas
- Coach: Sheldon Keefe
- Assistant coach: Gord Dineen; AJ MacLean
- Captain: Andrew Campbell (Note: Rich Clune was briefly captain when Campbell was recalled by the Maple Leafs.)
- Alternate captains: Rich Clune; Matt Frattin
- Arena: Ricoh Coliseum

Team leaders
- Goals: Mark Arcobello, (25); T.J. Brennan
- Assists: T.J. Brennan (43)
- Points: T.J. Brennan (68)
- Penalty minutes: Rich Clune (146)
- Plus/minus: Andrew Campbell (+39)
- Wins: Antoine Bibeau (28)
- Goals against average: Garret Sparks (2.33) (Minimum 20 games played)

The 2015–16 Toronto Marlies season is the franchise's 11th season in the American Hockey League, situated in the city of Toronto, Ontario. In his first season, head coach Sheldon Keefe led them. Their regular season began on October 9, 2015, against the Manitoba Moose and concluded on April 17, 2016, against their rival, the Rochester Americans. The Marlies looked to improve upon their progress in the 2014–15 season after being eliminated in the first round of the Eastern Conference Divisional Semifinals by the eventual Eastern Conference Finalists, the Grand Rapids Griffins. During the season, the Marlies broke numerous franchise records on their way to finishing first in the entire league. This was the Marlies' 5th divisional title and 4th in 5 years. The Marlies won the Macgregor Kilpatrick Trophy for the first time in franchise history as regular season champions. The Marlies set various franchise and league records, most notably securing the third-best record in AHL history and the best of any team in a 76-game season.

The Marlies would defeat the Bridgeport Sound Tigers in a 3-game sweep in the Division Semifinals, where then they would continue the momentum with a 7-game series victory over the Albany Devils in the Division Finals. Toronto would advance to their 3rd Conference Finals appearance in 5 seasons where they would fall to Hershey, 4-1, in 5 games.

On February 2, 2016, along with the Toronto Maple Leafs, the Marlies unveiled a new logo to coincide with the parent club's 100th anniversary.

During Game seven of the second round playoff series against Albany, Rich Clune scored the series-winning goal with under 3 minutes remaining in the third period, his first playoff goal as a professional; after which a fan in the Ricoh Coliseum was spotted with a poster stating "Clune wrestles bears for fun" as an allusion to their next opponent, the Hershey Bears, as well as his role as the main enforcer on the team.

== Standings ==
y– indicates team has clinched division and a playoff spot
x– indicates team has clinched a playoff spot
e– indicates team has been eliminated from playoff contention

=== Eastern Conference ===
| Atlantic Division | GP | W | L | OTL | SOL | Pts | Pts% | GF | GA |
|---|---|---|---|---|---|---|---|---|---|
| y–Hershey Bears (WSH) | 76 | 43 | 21 | 5 | 7 | 98 | .645 | 259 | 220 |
| x–Providence Bruins (BOS) | 76 | 41 | 22 | 9 | 4 | 95 | .625 | 238 | 198 |
| x–Wilkes-Barre/Scranton Penguins (PIT) | 76 | 43 | 27 | 4 | 2 | 92 | .605 | 230 | 203 |
| x–Portland Pirates (FLA) | 76 | 41 | 27 | 6 | 2 | 90 | .592 | 215 | 207 |
| x–Bridgeport Sound Tigers (NYI) | 76 | 40 | 29 | 4 | 3 | 87 | .572 | 209 | 220 |
| e–Hartford Wolf Pack (NYR) | 76 | 41 | 32 | 3 | 0 | 85 | .559 | 202 | 199 |
| e–Lehigh Valley Phantoms (PHI) | 76 | 34 | 35 | 4 | 3 | 75 | .493 | 215 | 222 |
| e–Springfield Falcons (ARZ) | 76 | 26 | 42 | 3 | 5 | 60 | .395 | 194 | 265 |

| North Division | GP | W | L | OTL | SOL | Pts | Pts% | GF | GA |
|---|---|---|---|---|---|---|---|---|---|
| y–Toronto Marlies (TOR) | 76 | 54 | 16 | 5 | 1 | 114 | .750 | 294 | 191 |
| x–Albany Devils (NJ) | 76 | 46 | 20 | 8 | 2 | 102 | .671 | 212 | 167 |
| x–Utica Comets (VAN) | 76 | 38 | 26 | 8 | 4 | 88 | .579 | 224 | 217 |
| e–Syracuse Crunch (TB) | 76 | 32 | 29 | 11 | 4 | 79 | .520 | 213 | 240 |
| e–St. John's IceCaps (MTL) | 76 | 32 | 33 | 8 | 3 | 75 | .493 | 208 | 239 |
| e–Rochester Americans (BUF) | 76 | 34 | 38 | 3 | 1 | 72 | .474 | 199 | 249 |
| e–Binghamton Senators (OTT) | 76 | 31 | 38 | 6 | 1 | 69 | .454 | 204 | 241 |

=== Western Conference ===
| Central Division | GP | W | L | OTL | SOL | Pts | Pts% | GF | GA |
|---|---|---|---|---|---|---|---|---|---|
| y–Milwaukee Admirals (NSH) | 76 | 48 | 23 | 3 | 2 | 101 | .664 | 224 | 193 |
| x–Lake Erie Monsters (CBJ) | 76 | 43 | 22 | 6 | 5 | 97 | .638 | 211 | 188 |
| x–Rockford IceHogs (CHI) | 76 | 40 | 22 | 10 | 4 | 94 | .618 | 214 | 205 |
| x–Grand Rapids Griffins (DET) | 76 | 44 | 30 | 1 | 1 | 90 | .592 | 238 | 195 |
| e–Charlotte Checkers (CAR) | 76 | 36 | 32 | 3 | 5 | 80 | .526 | 214 | 229 |
| e–Chicago Wolves (STL) | 76 | 33 | 35 | 5 | 3 | 74 | .487 | 194 | 228 |
| e–Manitoba Moose (WPG) | 76 | 26 | 41 | 4 | 5 | 61 | .401 | 180 | 250 |
| e–Iowa Wild (MIN) | 76 | 24 | 41 | 5 | 6 | 59 | .388 | 169 | 225 |

| Pacific Division | GP | W | L | OTL | SOL | Pts | Pts% | GF | GA |
|---|---|---|---|---|---|---|---|---|---|
| y–Ontario Reign (LA) | 68 | 44 | 19 | 4 | 1 | 93 | .684 | 192 | 138 |
| x–San Diego Gulls (ANA) | 68 | 39 | 23 | 4 | 2 | 84 | .618 | 208 | 200 |
| x–Texas Stars (DAL) | 76 | 40 | 25 | 8 | 3 | 91 | .599 | 277 | 246 |
| x–San Jose Barracuda (SJ) | 68 | 31 | 26 | 8 | 3 | 73 | .537 | 198 | 193 |
| e–Bakersfield Condors (EDM) | 68 | 31 | 28 | 7 | 2 | 71 | .522 | 212 | 222 |
| e–Stockton Heat (CGY) | 68 | 32 | 32 | 2 | 2 | 68 | .500 | 194 | 224 |
| e–San Antonio Rampage (COL) | 76 | 33 | 35 | 8 | 0 | 74 | .487 | 213 | 240 |

== Regular season ==
| Eastern Conference | | | | | | | | | | | | | | | | | | | | Western Conference | | | | | | | | | | |
| North Division | | | | | | | | | | | | | Atlantic Division | | | | | | | Central Division | | | | | | | | | Pacific Division | |
| Team | Home | | | | | | Away | | | | | | Team | Home | | | Away | | | Team | Home | | | | Away | | | | No Games Played | |
|---|---|---|---|---|---|---|---|---|---|---|---|---|---|---|---|---|---|---|---|---|---|---|---|---|---|---|---|---|---|---|
| Albany | 3-2 | 2-3 | 4-0 | - | - | - | 3-2 | 2-3 | 3-0 | - | - | - | Bridgeport Sound | - | - | - | - | - | - | Charlotte | - | - | - | - | - | - | - | - | Bakersfield | |
| Binghamton | 6-4 | 5-6 | 3-1 | - | - | - | 1-5 | 6-1 | 3-2 | - | - | - | Hartford | 2-3 | - | - | 5-0 | - | - | Chicago | - | - | - | - | - | - | - | - | Ontario | |
| Rochester | 5-1 | 10-5 | 3-1 | 4-2 | - | - | 8-2 | 1-0 | 4-0 | 2-4 | - | - | Hershey | 2-5 | - | - | 6-2 | - | - | Grand Rapids | 6-1 | 6-3 | - | - | 4-0 | 4-2 | - | - | San Antonio | |
| St. John's | 2-6 | 1-5 | 5-2 | 4-5 | 5-3 | 4-0 | 2-3 | 9-8 | 6-3 | 4-6 | 1-3 | 2-1 | Lehigh Valley | 3-2 | - | - | 3-1 | - | - | Iowa | - | - | - | - | - | - | - | - | San Diego | |
| Syracuse | 1-3 | 3-2 | 3-2 | 5-4 | - | - | 3-1 | 4-3 | 4-3 | 2-3 | - | - | Portland | 3-1 | - | - | 9-2 | - | - | Lake Erie | 3-2 | 4-3 | - | - | 1-2 | 4-1 | - | - | San Jose | |
| Utica | 4-5 | 4-2 | 7-1 | 4-5 | - | - | 5-4 | 2-0 | 3-2 | 0-4 | - | - | Providence | 4-5 | - | - | 2-3 | - | - | Manitoba | 5-3 | 3-2 | 3-1 | 9-0 | 3-0 | 4-1 | 6-2 | 5-6 | Stockton | |
| - | - | - | - | - | - | - | - | - | - | - | - | - | Springfield | - | - | - | - | - | - | Milwaukee | - | - | - | - | - | - | - | - | Texas | |
| - | - | - | - | - | - | - | - | - | - | - | - | - | W-B/Scranton | 4-2 | - | - | 4-3 | - | - | Rockford | - | - | - | - | - | - | - | - | - | |
| Record | Home 14-6-2 | | | | | | Away 16-6-2 | | | | | | Record | Home 3-3-0 | | | Away 5-0-1 | | | Record | Home 8-0-0 | | | | Away 6-1-1 | | | | Home0-0-0 | Away0-0-0 |
| Total 30-12-4 | | | | | | | | | | | | | Total 8-3-1 | | | | | | | Total 14-1-1 | | | | | | | | | Total 0-0-0 | |
| Total 38-15-5 | | | | | | | | | | | | | | | | | | | | Total 14-1-1 | | | | | | | | | | |
Grand Total 52-16-6

== 2016 Calder Cup playoffs ==
| Round | Opponent/Game | | 1 | 2 | 3 | 4 | 5 | 6 | 7 |
|---|---|---|---|---|---|---|---|---|---|
| 1 | Bridgeport Sound | H | | | 6–4 | | | N/A | |
| 1 | Bridgeport Sound | A | 4–1 | 3–0 | | | | N/A | |
| 2 | Albany | H | 1–2 | 5–3 | | | | 1–4 | 4–3 |
| 2 | Albany | A | | | 2–3 | 7–2 | 5–1 | | |
| 3 | Hershey | H | | | 2–8 | 5–0 | 2–3 | | |
| 3 | Hershey | A | 1–3 | 2–3 | | | | | |

== Toronto Marlies 2015-16 Individual Stats ==
| # | Player | Pos | GP | G | A | PTS | +/- | PIM | PP | SHG | SOG | SH% |
|---|---|---|---|---|---|---|---|---|---|---|---|---|
| 3 | T.J. Brennan | D | 69 | 25 | 43 | 68 | 34 | 53 | 9 | 0 | 169 | 14.8 |
| 28 | Mark Arcobello | C | 49 | 25 | 34 | 59 | 19 | 22 | 8 | 2 | 169 | 14.8 |
| 37 | Colin Smith (total) | C | 77 | 20 | 36 | 56 | 4 | 37 | 3 | 1 | 158 | 12.7 |
| | SA | C | 54 | 13 | 21 | 34 | -4 | 33 | 2 | 1 | 115 | 11.3 |
| | TOR | C | 23 | 7 | 15 | 22 | 8 | 4 | 1 | 0 | 43 | 16.3 |
| 19 | Brendan Leipsic | LW | 65 | 20 | 34 | 54 | 16 | 55 | 5 | 1 | 169 | 11.8 |
| 14 | Josh Leivo | LW | 51 | 17 | 31 | 48 | 14 | 14 | 5 | 0 | 158 | 10.8 |
| 62 | William Nylander | C | 38 | 18 | 27 | 45 | 7 | 10 | 3 | 0 | 112 | 16.1 |
| 11 | Zach Hyman | RW | 59 | 15 | 22 | 37 | 31 | 24 | 0 | 4 | 134 | 11.2 |
| 16 | Sam Carrick | C | 52 | 16 | 18 | 34 | 11 | 90 | 3 | 0 | 113 | 14.2 |
| 39 | Matt Frattin | RW | 71 | 13 | 21 | 34 | 3 | 51 | 2 | 0 | 131 | 9.9 |
| 20 | Tobias Lindberg (total) | LW | 56 | 11 | 23 | 34 | 12 | 20 | 3 | 0 | 127 | 8.7 |
| | BNG | LW | 34 | 5 | 17 | 22 | 10 | 8 | 0 | 0 | 67 | 7.5 |
| | TOR | LW | 22 | 6 | 6 | 12 | 2 | 12 | 3 | 0 | 60 | 10.0 |
| 29 | Connor Brown | RW | 34 | 11 | 18 | 29 | 10 | 8 | 3 | 1 | 75 | 14.7 |
| 4 | Connor Carrick (total) | D | 52 | 11 | 18 | 29 | 25 | 52 | 4 | 1 | 113 | 9.7 |
| | HER | D | 47 | 10 | 16 | 26 | 23 | 50 | 3 | 1 | 104 | 9.6 |
| | TOR | D | 5 | 1 | 2 | 3 | 2 | 2 | 1 | 0 | 9 | 11.1 |
| 90 | Nikita Soshnikov | LW | 52 | 18 | 10 | 28 | 26 | 18 | 3 | 2 | 120 | 15.0 |
| 18 | Richard Panik (X) | RW | 33 | 9 | 16 | 25 | 5 | 34 | 0 | 0 | 66 | 13.6 |
| 42 | Kasperi Kapanen | LW | 44 | 9 | 16 | 25 | 7 | 8 | 4 | 0 | 65 | 13.8 |
| 2 | Andrew Campbell | D | 66 | 9 | 15 | 24 | 39 | 72 | 0 | 0 | 87 | 10.3 |
| 17 | Richard Clune | LW | 49 | 8 | 16 | 24 | 20 | 146 | 2 | 2 | 44 | 18.2 |
| 10 | Stuart Percy | D | 58 | 4 | 20 | 24 | 3 | 47 | 0 | 0 | 66 | 6.1 |
| 61 | Rinat Valiev | D | 60 | 4 | 19 | 23 | 32 | 30 | 0 | 1 | 59 | 6.8 |
| 41 | Justin Holl | D | 60 | 5 | 16 | 21 | 32 | 15 | 0 | 0 | 93 | 5.4 |
| 23 | Frederik Gauthier | C | 56 | 6 | 12 | 18 | 18 | 10 | 0 | 0 | 51 | 11.8 |
| 37 | Casey Bailey (X) | RW | 38 | 4 | 14 | 18 | 5 | 16 | 0 | 0 | 55 | 7.3 |
| 36 | Brett Findlay | C | 39 | 6 | 11 | 17 | 9 | 6 | 0 | 0 | 54 | 11.1 |
| 21 | Ben Smith (total) | RW | 19 | 12 | 4 | 16 | 2 | 4 | 4 | 1 | 49 | 24.5 |
| | SJ | RW | 14 | 8 | 2 | 10 | -1 | 4 | 3 | 1 | 33 | 24.2 |
| | TOR | RW | 5 | 4 | 2 | 6 | 3 | 0 | 1 | 0 | 16 | 25.0 |
| 50 | Viktor Loov | D | 55 | 3 | 12 | 15 | 14 | 40 | 0 | 0 | 77 | 3.9 |
| 24 | Colin Greening (total) | LW | 41 | 7 | 6 | 13 | -9 | 52 | 1 | 1 | 89 | 7.9 |
| | BNG | LW | 41 | 7 | 6 | 13 | -9 | 52 | 1 | 1 | 89 | 7.9 |
| 20 | Ryan Rupert (X) | C | 29 | 6 | 6 | 12 | 11 | 14 | 1 | 0 | 30 | 20.0 |
| 7 | Eric Faille | RW | 15 | 7 | 3 | 10 | 5 | 2 | 1 | 0 | 28 | 25.0 |
| 38 | John Kurtz (total) | LW | 39 | 3 | 3 | 6 | 0 | 38 | 0 | 0 | 31 | 9.7 |
| | UTI | LW | 25 | 2 | 0 | 2 | -5 | 38 | 0 | 0 | 16 | 12.5 |
| | TOR | LW | 14 | 1 | 3 | 4 | 5 | 0 | 0 | 0 | 15 | 6.7 |
| 9 | Jeremy Morin (X) | LW | 13 | 2 | 4 | 6 | 0 | 8 | 1 | 0 | 29 | 6.9 |
| 25 | James Martin | D | 17 | 0 | 5 | 5 | 1 | 13 | 0 | 0 | 19 | 0.0 |
| 27 | David Kolomatis | D | 23 | 1 | 3 | 4 | 12 | 8 | 0 | 0 | 24 | 4.2 |
| 54 | Byron Froese | C | 4 | 3 | 0 | 3 | -1 | 0 | 1 | 0 | 13 | 23.1 |
| 22 | Shane Conacher | RW | 7 | 2 | 1 | 3 | 2 | 0 | 0 | 0 | 15 | 13.3 |
| 6 | Scott Harrington | D | 17 | 1 | 2 | 3 | 4 | 14 | 0 | 0 | 20 | 5.0 |
| 4 | Frank Corrado | D | 7 | 0 | 3 | 3 | 3 | 2 | 0 | 0 | 7 | 0.0 |
| 44 | Taylor Doherty | D | 12 | 0 | 3 | 3 | 7 | 20 | 0 | 0 | 9 | 0.0 |
| 40 | Garret Sparks | G | 21 | 0 | 3 | 3 | 0 | 0 | 0 | 0 | 0 | 0.0 |
| 54 | Tony Cameranesi | F | 6 | 2 | 0 | 2 | 2 | 0 | 0 | 0 | 5 | 40.0 |
| 24 | Jordan Hickmott | RW | 3 | 1 | 1 | 2 | 1 | 0 | 0 | 0 | 6 | 16.7 |
| 26 | Chase Witala | LW | 3 | 0 | 2 | 2 | 2 | 0 | 0 | 0 | 5 | 0.0 |
| 59 | Willie Corrin | D | 4 | 0 | 2 | 2 | 4 | 6 | 0 | 0 | 5 | 0.0 |
| 6 | Andrew Nielsen | D | 5 | 0 | 2 | 2 | -2 | 0 | 0 | 0 | 5 | 0.0 |
| 18 | Rylan Schwartz | C | 5 | 1 | 0 | 1 | -1 | 0 | 0 | 0 | 6 | 16.7 |
| 8 | Eric Baier (X) | D | 1 | 0 | 1 | 1 | 0 | 0 | 0 | 0 | 3 | 0.0 |
| 45 | Tyler Wong | RW | 3 | 0 | 1 | 1 | 0 | 0 | 0 | 0 | 5 | 0.0 |
| 5 | Ty Stanton | D | 4 | 0 | 1 | 1 | 1 | 0 | 0 | 0 | 3 | 0.0 |
| 12 | Jack Rodewald | RW | 7 | 0 | 1 | 1 | 1 | 4 | 0 | 0 | 7 | 0.0 |
| 49 | Justin Johnson | RW | 8 | 0 | 1 | 1 | 0 | 36 | 0 | 0 | 5 | 0.0 |
| 31 | Ryan Massa | G | 1 | 0 | 0 | 0 | 0 | 0 | 0 | 0 | 0 | 0.0 |
| 33 | Kasimir Kaskisuo | G | 2 | 0 | 0 | 0 | 0 | 0 | 0 | 0 | 0 | 0.0 |
| 26 | Tylor Spink | C | 2 | 0 | 0 | 0 | 0 | 0 | 0 | 0 | 1 | 0.0 |
| 15 | T.J. Foster | RW | 3 | 0 | 0 | 0 | -1 | 2 | 0 | 0 | 4 | 0.0 |
| 47 | Mason Marchment | LW | 3 | 0 | 0 | 0 | 0 | 0 | 0 | 0 | 5 | 0.0 |
| 45 | Jonathan Bernier | G | 4 | 0 | 0 | 0 | 0 | 0 | 0 | 0 | 0 | 0.0 |
| 30 | Rob Madore | G | 4 | 0 | 0 | 0 | 0 | 0 | 0 | 0 | 0 | 0.0 |
| 32 | Alex Stalock (total) | G | 5 | 0 | 0 | 0 | 0 | 0 | 0 | 0 | 0 | 0.0 |
| | SJ | G | 2 | 0 | 0 | 0 | 0 | 0 | 0 | 0 | 0 | 0.0 |
| | TOR | G | 3 | 0 | 0 | 0 | 0 | 0 | 0 | 0 | 0 | 0.0 |
| 33 | Ray Emery (total) | G | 6 | 0 | 0 | 0 | 0 | 0 | 0 | 0 | 0 | 0.0 |
| | ONT | G | 3 | 0 | 0 | 0 | 0 | 0 | 0 | 0 | 0 | 0.0 |
| | TOR | G | 3 | 0 | 0 | 0 | 0 | 0 | 0 | 0 | 0 | 0.0 |
| 1 | Antoine Bibeau | G | 40 | 0 | 0 | 0 | 0 | 0 | 0 | 0 | 0 | 0.0 |
| | BENCH | | 76 | 4 | | | | 20 | | | 4 | |
| | TOTALS | | 76 | 294 | 498 | 788 | 426 | 936 | 57 | 13 | 2473 | 0.117 |

| # | Goalies | GP | Mins | W | L | SOL | SO | GA | GAA | SVS | SV% |
|---|---|---|---|---|---|---|---|---|---|---|---|
| 31 | Ryan Massa | 1 | 59:56 | 1 | 0 | 0 | 0 | 1 | 1.00 | 16 | 0.941 |
| 30 | Rob Madore | 4 | 240:00 | 4 | 0 | 0 | 1 | 5 | 1.25 | 99 | 0.952 |
| 45 | Jonathan Bernier | 4 | 239:43 | 3 | 0 | 0 | 3 | 5 | 1.25 | 91 | 0.948 |
| 40 | Garret Sparks | 21 | 1211:33 | 14 | 4 | 0 | 3 | 47 | 2.33 | 602 | 0.928 |
| 32 | Alex Stalock | 5 | 302:54 | 3 | 2 | 0 | 0 | 12 | 2.38 | 131 | 0.916 |
| | SJ | 2 | 122:22 | 2 | 0 | 0 | 0 | 4 | 1.96 | 53 | 0.930 |
| | TOR | 3 | 180:32 | 1 | 2 | 0 | 0 | 8 | 2.66 | 78 | 0.907 |
| 33 | Kasimir Kaskisuo | 2 | 125:00 | 1 | 0 | 1 | 0 | 5 | 2.40 | 48 | 0.906 |
| 1 | Antoine Bibeau | 40 | 2353:44 | 28 | 9 | 0 | 3 | 106 | 2.70 | 1064 | 0.909 |
| 33 | Ray Emery | 6 | 360:25 | 3 | 2 | 0 | 0 | 18 | 3.00 | 142 | 0.888 |
| | ONT | 3 | 181:56 | 1 | 1 | 0 | 0 | 10 | 3.30 | 72 | 0.878 |
| | TOR | 3 | 178:29 | 2 | 1 | 0 | 0 | 8 | 2.69 | 70 | 0.897 |
| | TOTALS | 76 | 4616:00 | 54 | 16 | 1 | 10 | 190 | 2.47 | 2068 | 0.916 |

== Toronto Marlies 2016 Playoffs Individual Stats ==
| # | Player | Pos | GP | G | A | PTS | +/- | PIM | PP | SHG | SOG | SH% |
|---|---|---|---|---|---|---|---|---|---|---|---|---|
| 4 | Connor Carrick | D | 11 | 6 | 8 | 14 | 6 | 12 | 2 | 0 | 33 | 18.2 |
| 29 | Connor Brown | RW | 11 | 6 | 2 | 8 | -3 | 4 | 1 | 2 | 23 | 26.1 |
| 42 | Kasperi Kapanen | LW | 10 | 3 | 5 | 8 | 4 | 2 | 1 | 0 | 12 | 25.0 |
| 14 | Josh Leivo | LW | 11 | 2 | 6 | 8 | 2 | 10 | 0 | 0 | 35 | 5.7 |
| 28 | Mark Arcobello | C | 11 | 1 | 7 | 8 | 3 | 2 | 1 | 0 | 25 | 4.0 |
| 62 | William Nylander | C | 10 | 3 | 4 | 7 | 4 | 2 | 0 | 0 | 15 | 20.0 |
| 21 | Ben Smith | RW | 11 | 2 | 5 | 7 | 7 | 2 | 0 | 0 | 25 | 8.0 |
| 3 | T.J. Brennan | D | 11 | 5 | 0 | 5 | -1 | 6 | 4 | 0 | 37 | 13.5 |
| 90 | Nikita Soshnikov | LW | 7 | 4 | 1 | 5 | 4 | 2 | 0 | 0 | 14 | 28.6 |
| 11 | Zach Hyman | RW | 11 | 3 | 2 | 5 | 5 | 21 | 0 | 0 | 26 | 11.5 |
| 16 | Sam Carrick | C | 10 | 0 | 5 | 5 | -1 | 11 | 0 | 0 | 17 | 0.0 |
| 19 | Brendan Leipsic | LW | 11 | 2 | 2 | 4 | 1 | 12 | 1 | 0 | 20 | 10.0 |
| 50 | Viktor Loov | D | 9 | 1 | 2 | 3 | 0 | 14 | 0 | 0 | 5 | 20.0 |
| 17 | Richard Clune | LW | 11 | 1 | 2 | 3 | 2 | 16 | 0 | 0 | 6 | 16.7 |
| 2 | Andrew Campbell | D | 5 | 0 | 2 | 2 | 4 | 4 | 0 | 0 | 6 | 0.0 |
| 37 | Colin Smith | C | 5 | 0 | 2 | 2 | -1 | 2 | 0 | 0 | 7 | 0.0 |
| 10 | Stuart Percy | D | 10 | 0 | 2 | 2 | 4 | 8 | 0 | 0 | 9 | 0.0 |
| 41 | Justin Holl | D | 11 | 0 | 2 | 2 | 2 | 2 | 0 | 0 | 9 | 0.0 |
| 57 | Travis Dermott | D | 1 | 0 | 0 | 0 | -1 | 0 | 0 | 0 | 2 | 0.0 |
| 39 | Matt Frattin | RW | 1 | 0 | 0 | 0 | -2 | 0 | 0 | 0 | 0 | 0.0 |
| 8 | Andreas Johnsson | RW | 2 | 0 | 0 | 0 | -1 | 0 | 0 | 0 | 2 | 0.0 |
| 20 | Tobias Lindberg | LW | 3 | 0 | 0 | 0 | 0 | 2 | 0 | 0 | 3 | 0.0 |
| 40 | Garret Sparks | G | 3 | 0 | 0 | 0 | 0 | 0 | 0 | 0 | 0 | 0.0 |
| 23 | Frederik Gauthier | C | 7 | 0 | 0 | 0 | 1 | 4 | 0 | 0 | 5 | 0.0 |
| 61 | Rinat Valiev | D | 8 | 0 | 0 | 0 | 4 | 2 | 0 | 0 | 3 | 0.0 |
| 1 | Antoine Bibeau | G | 9 | 0 | 0 | 0 | 0 | 0 | 0 | 0 | 0 | 0.0 |
| | BENCH | | 11 | 0 | | | | 0 | | | 0 | |
| | TOTALS | | 11 | 39 | 59 | 98 | 43 | 140 | 10 | 2 | 339 | 0.115 |

| # | Goalies | GP | Mins | W | L | SOL | SO | GA | GAA | SVS | SV% |
|---|---|---|---|---|---|---|---|---|---|---|---|
| 40 | Garret Sparks | 3 | 146:10 | 2 | 1 | 0 | 1 | 2 | 0.82 | 70 | 0.972 |
| 1 | Antoine Bibeau | 9 | 523:37 | 5 | 3 | 0 | 0 | 24 | 2.75 | 229 | 0.905 |
| | Totals | 11 | 678:40 | 7 | 4 | 0 | 1 | 26 | 2.30 | 299 | 0.920 |
