= List of Toronto Marlies seasons =

Seasons of the professional American Hockey League team

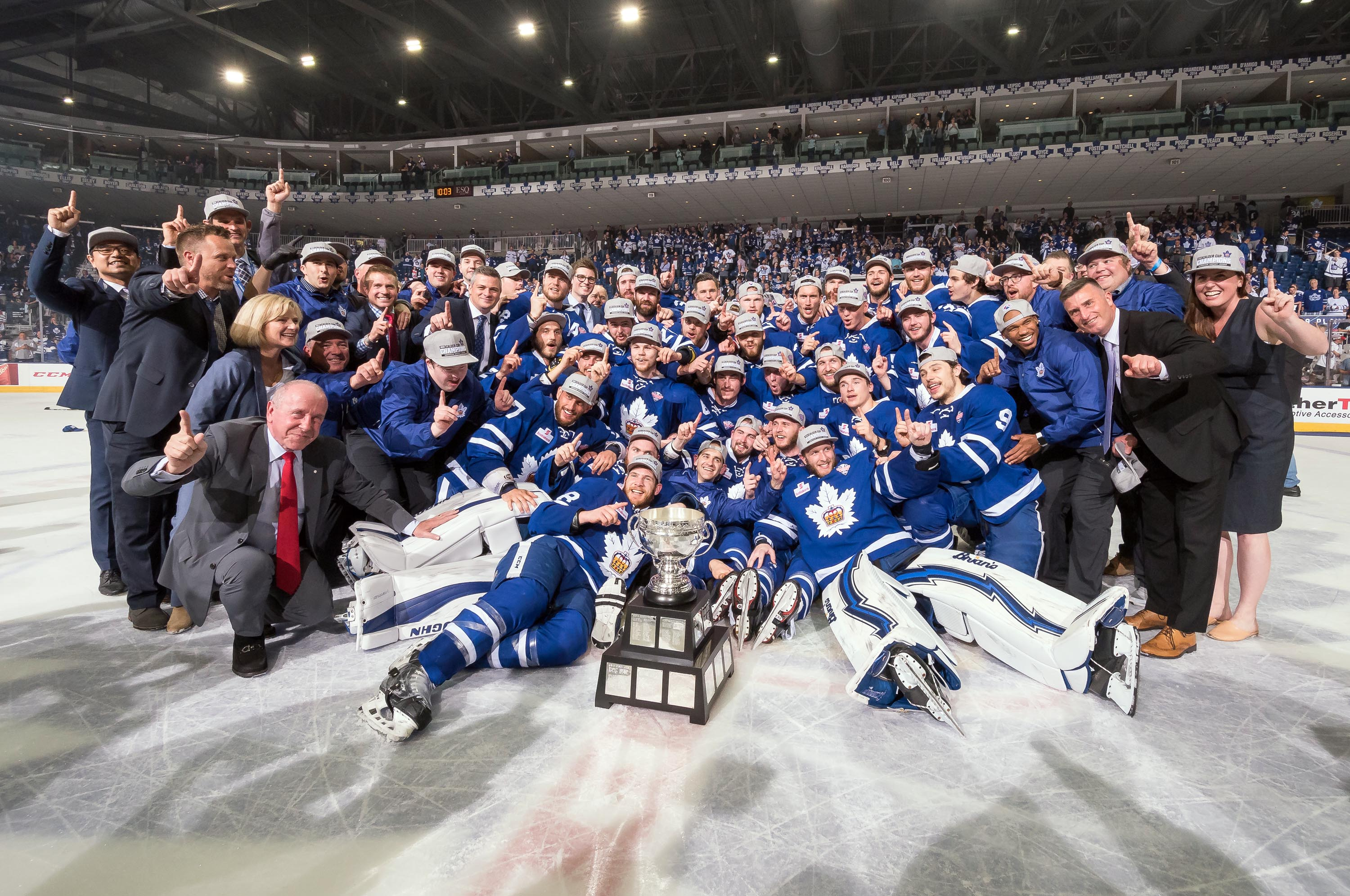
The Toronto Marlies celebrating their 2018 championship.

The Toronto Marlies are a professional American Hockey League (AHL) team based in Toronto, Ontario. They serve as the top minor-league affiliate of the Toronto Maple Leafs of the National Hockey League (NHL). Established in the 2005 season following the relocation of the St. John's Maple Leafs, the Marlies have played their home games at Coca-Cola Coliseum since their inaugural campaign.

Since their inception, the Marlies have been one of the AHL’s most competitive teams, consistently qualifying for the playoffs and earning multiple division titles. They reached the Calder Cup Finals in 2012, and captured their first Calder Cup championship in 2018 by defeating the Texas Stars in a seven-game series, and in 2026 against the Chicago Wolves.

In their inaugural season under the new name, the Marlies competed in the North Division, in the Western Conference, and established a foundation for future success. Their early years were highlighted by a strong affiliation with the Toronto Maple Leafs, which helped strengthen their roster and development system. They would qualify for the playoffs before falling to Grand Rapids in 5 games. In the 2007–08 season, the Marlies would win 50 games and record 109 points, winning the North Division and advancing to the Western Conference Finals, where they were defeated by the, eventual Calder Cup champions, Chicago Wolves in 5 games. The team continued to improve, culminating in their capturing of the Macgregor Kilpatrick Trophy during the 2015–16 and 2017–18 regular season for having the best record. In the playoffs that year.

== Season-by-season results ==
Calder Cup champions	Conference champions	Division champions	League leader

Records as of the end of the 2024–25 season.

Regular season											Playoffs					
Season	Games	Won	Lost	OTL	SOL	Points	PCT	Goals for	Goals against	Standing	Year	Prelims	1st round	2nd round	3rd round	Finals
2005–06	80	41	29	6	4	92	.575	270	263	4th, North	2006	—	L, 1–4, GR	—	—	—
2006–07	80	34	39	2	5	75	.469	220	270	6th, North	2007	Did not qualify				
2007–08	80	50	21	3	6	109	.681	246	203	1st, North	2008	—	W, 4–3, SA	W, 4–3, SYR	L, 1–4, CHI	—
2008–09	80	39	29	5	7	90	.563	240	229	4th, North	2009	—	L, 2–4, MTB	—	—	—
2009–10	80	33	35	6	6	78	.488	193	261	5th, North	2010	Did not qualify				
2010–11	80	37	32	1	10_{[1]}	85	.531	228	219	5th, North	2011	Did not qualify				
2011–12	76	44	24	5	3	96	.632	217	175_{[4]}	1st, North	2012	—	W, 3–0, RCH	W, 4–1, ABB	W, 4–1, OKC	L, 0–4, NOR
2012–13	76	43	23	3	7	96	.632	237	199	1st, North	2013	—	W, 3–0, RCH	L, 2–4, GR	—	—
2013–14	76	45	25	2	4	96	.632	223	202	1st, North	2014	—	W, 3–0, MIL	W, 4–0, CHI	L, 3–4, TEX	—
2014–15	76	40	27	9	0	89	.586	207	203	2nd, North	2015	—	L, 2–3, GR	—	—	—
2015–16	76	54	16_{[3]}	5	1	114	.750	294	191	1st, North	2016	—	W, 3–0, BRI	W, 4–3, ALB	L, 1–4, HER	—
2016–17	76	42	29	4	1	89	.586	245	207	2nd, North	2017	—	W, 3–1, ALB	L, 3–4, SYR	—	—
2017–18	76	54	18_{[2]}	2	2	112	.737	254	170_{[3]}	1st, North	2018	—	W, 3–2, UTI	W, 4–0, SYR	W, 4–0, LV	W, 4–3, TEX
2018–19	76	39	24	9	4	91	.599	248	243	3rd, North	2019	—	W, 3–0, RCH	W, 4–0, CLE	L, 2–4, CHA	—
2019–20	61	29	27	3	2	63	.516	206	212	7th, North	2020	Season cancelled due to the COVID-19 pandemic				
2020–21	35	16	17	0	2	34	.486	111	119	4th, Canadian	2021	No playoffs were held				
2021–22	72	37	30	4	1	79	.549	243	244	6th, North	2022	Did not qualify				
2022–23	72	42	24	4	2	90	.625	229	225	1st, North	2023	BYE	W, 3–1, UTI	L, 0–3, ROC	—	—
2023–24	72	34	26	10	2	80	.556	249	220	5th, North	2024	L, 1–2, BEL	—	—	—	—
2024–25	72	37	23	4	8	86	.597	209	197	4th, North	2025	L, 0–2, CLE	—	—	—	—
2025–26	72	36	26	5	5	82	.569	229	228	4th, North	2026	W, 2–1, ROC	W, 3–2, LAV	W, 3–2, CLE	W, 4–2, WBS	W, 4–1, CHI
Totals	1544	826	544	92	82	1826	.562	4798	4480			15 playoff appearances				

_{[1]}-Indicates league leading: most shootout losses

_{[2]}-Indicates league leading: fewest losses

_{[3]}-Indicates league leading: fewest goals against

== Franchise totals ==
=== All-time records ===
Franchise totals
Affiliation	Regular season						Postseason				Composite					
Affiliation	GP	W	L	T	OTL	SOL	Apps.	GP	W	L	GP	W	L	T	OTL	SOL
Toronto Marlies (2005–2026)	1544	826	544	0	92	82	15	170	98	72	1714	924	616	0	92	92
All-time series record: 23–13
