= Andrew Campbell (ice hockey) =

Canadian ice hockey player (born 1988)

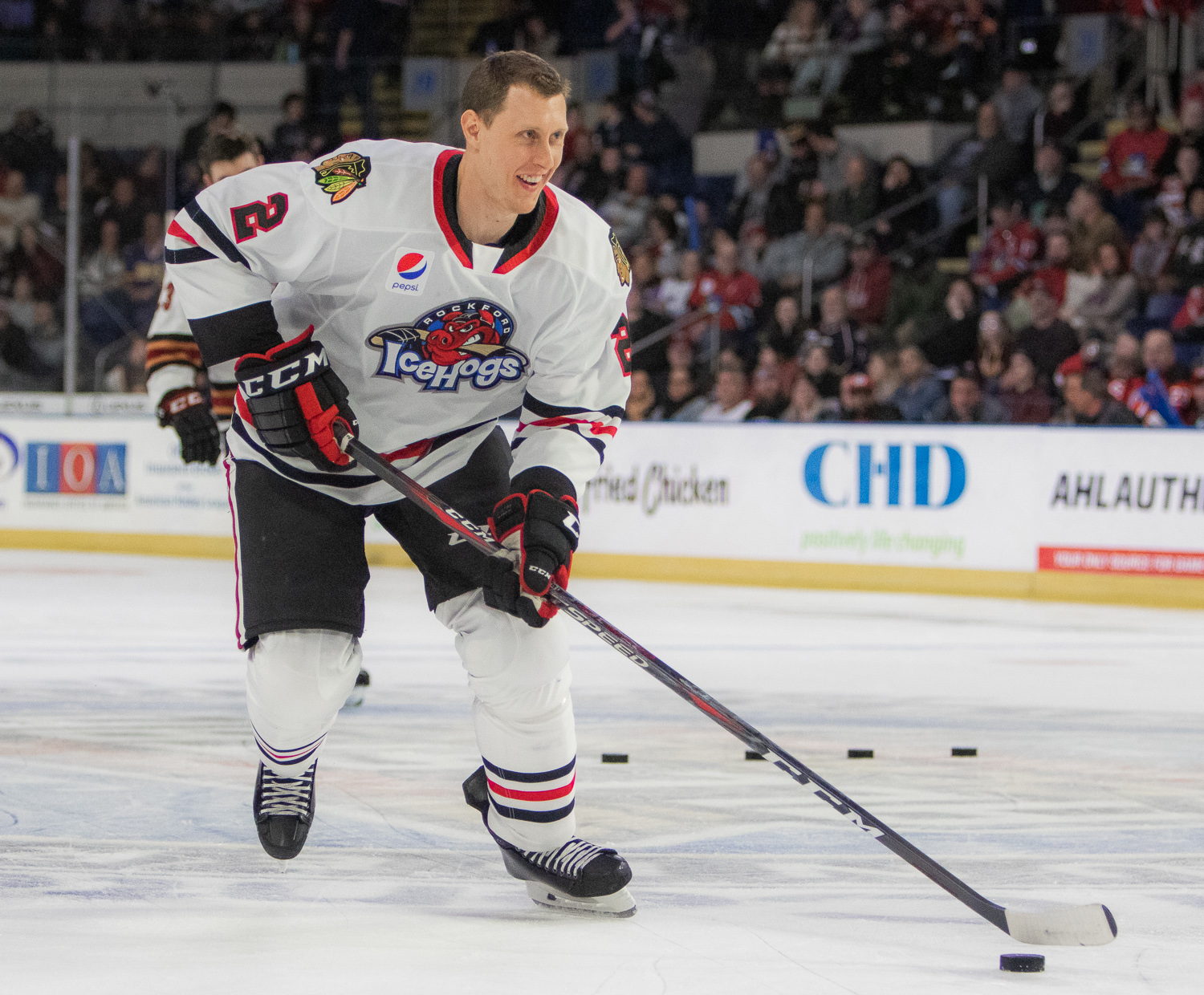
- Campbell with the Rockford IceHogs in 2019
- Born: February 4, 1988 (age 38) Caledonia, Ontario, Canada
- Height: 6 ft 4 in (193 cm)
- Weight: 206 lb (93 kg; 14 st 10 lb)
- Position: Defence
- Shot: Left
- Played for: Los Angeles Kings; Arizona Coyotes; Toronto Maple Leafs
- NHL draft: 74th overall, 2008; Los Angeles Kings
- Playing career: 2008–2019

Andrew Campbell (born February 4, 1988) is a Canadian former professional ice hockey defenseman and current head coach of the Belleville Senators. He played for the Los Angeles Kings, Arizona Coyotes, and Toronto Maple Leafs of the National Hockey League (NHL). Campbell was drafted by the Kings in the third round, 74th overall of the 2008 NHL entry draft. He was born and raised in Caledonia, Ontario, in Haldimand County.

== Playing career ==
Campbell played three seasons of major junior hockey with the Sault Ste. Marie Greyhounds of the Ontario Hockey League (OHL). The Caledonia, Ontario native was drafted by the Los Angeles Kings in the third round, 74th overall of the 2008 NHL entry draft. He is nicknamed 'Soupy'.

Campbell began his professional career playing for the Manchester Monarchs of the American Hockey League (AHL) during the 2008–09 AHL season. After playing 298 games with the Monarchs, scoring 8 goals and 50 points he was signed by the Los Angeles Kings on July 3, 2012, to a two-year entry-level contract. On April 5, 2014, after playing 444 games in the AHL, Campbell finally made his NHL debut for the Kings in a 2–1 loss against the Vancouver Canucks. He replaced an injured Drew Doughty. Campbell played two more games for the Kings that year but finished the season with the Monarchs scoring 3 goals and 16 points in 69 games.

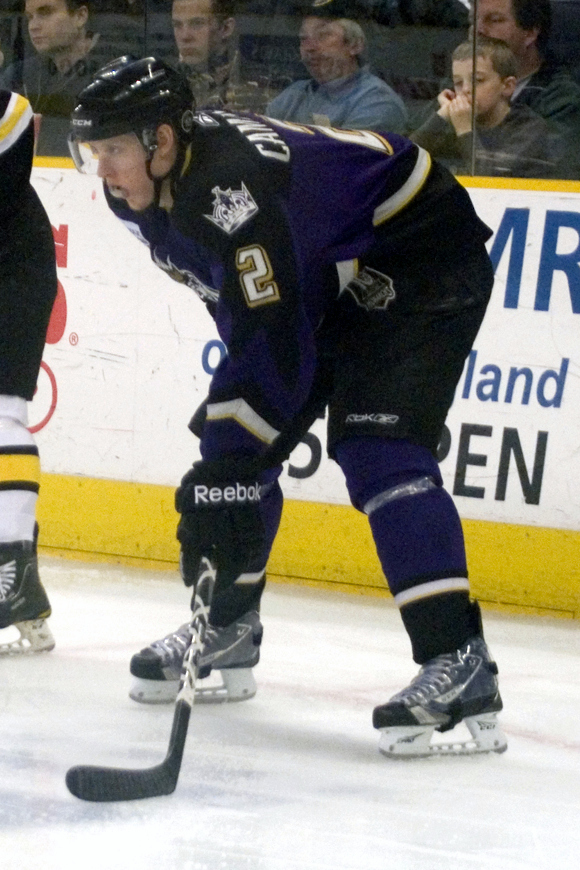
Campbell playing for the Manchester Monarchs in 2011

After spending the first six years of his professional career entirely within the Kings organization, Campbell left as a free agent to sign a one-year contract with the Arizona Coyotes on July 1, 2014. In the 2014–15 season, Campbell was originally assigned to AHL affiliate, the Portland Pirates. Campbell would later be recalled and remained in the NHL for the duration of the season with the Coyotes, appearing in 33 games from the blueline registering one point. He played alongside Connor Murphy on the third pairing. Despite experiencing a break through season in the NHL, Campbell was unable to attract an NHL offer as a free agent and on July 3, 2015, was signed to a one-year AHL contract with the Toronto Marlies. Later that year, on September 29, Campbell signed a two-year, two-way contract with the Marlies' parent club, the Toronto Maple Leafs. He was reassigned to continue with the Marlies, and was later named team captain. Campbell appeared in 6 games with the Maple Leafs and 6 goals and 22 points in 75 games with the Marlies.

On July 1, 2017, having left the Maple Leafs as a free agent, Campbell agreed to a return with the Arizona Coyotes in signing a two-year, two-way contract. He played the season with the Tucson Roadrunners, the AHL affiliate of the Coyotes, registering 2 goals and 6 points in 60 games while serving as the team's captain. On July 12, 2018, Campbell was part of a multi-player deal between the Coyotes and the Chicago Blackhawks, being sent along with Marcus Krüger, Jordan Maletta, prospect MacKenzie Entwistle, and a fifth-round pick in 2019 in exchange for the contract of Marián Hossa, Vinnie Hinostroza, Jordan Oesterle, and a third-round pick in 2019. He was sent down to the Blackhawks' AHL affiliate, the Rockford IceHogs, and was named captain of the Western Conference All-Star Team that year. Campbell went unsigned at the end of the season and became an unrestricted free agent.

== Coaching career ==
Campbell joined the Hamilton Bulldogs as an assistant coach for the 2019–20 OHL season working under head coach Vince Laise. After Laise was fired in March 2020, Campbell was retained by general manager Steve Staios who took over, and then by new incoming coach, Jay McKee. On July 1, 2024, Campbell was hired to be an assistant coach for the Belleville Senators, the AHL affiliate of the Ottawa Senators. After head coach David Bell was fired on December 17, 2025, Campbell was named interim head coach.

== Career statistics ==
			Regular season					Playoffs
Season	Team	League	GP	G	A	Pts	PIM	GP	G	A	Pts	PIM
2005–06	Sault Ste. Marie Greyhounds	OHL	31	1	3	4	23	3	0	0	0	4
2006–07	Sault Ste. Marie Greyhounds	OHL	63	4	14	18	75	13	0	1	1	6
2007–08	Sault Ste. Marie Greyhounds	OHL	68	13	22	35	64	14	2	3	5	13
2008–09	Manchester Monarchs	AHL	72	3	5	8	72	—	—	—	—	—
2009–10	Manchester Monarchs	AHL	74	2	9	11	68	16	1	4	5	6
2010–11	Manchester Monarchs	AHL	76	1	11	12	68	7	0	0	0	0
2011–12	Manchester Monarchs	AHL	76	2	17	19	54	4	0	0	0	9
2012–13	Manchester Monarchs	AHL	47	2	9	11	40	4	0	0	0	2
2013–14	Manchester Monarchs	AHL	69	3	13	16	58	4	1	0	1	0
2013–14	Los Angeles Kings	NHL	3	0	0	0	0	—	—	—	—	—
2014–15	Portland Pirates	AHL	40	3	9	12	30	—	—	—	—	—
2014–15	Arizona Coyotes	NHL	33	0	1	1	10	—	—	—	—	—
2015–16	Toronto Marlies	AHL	66	9	15	24	72	9	0	2	2	4
2015–16	Toronto Maple Leafs	NHL	6	0	1	1	2	—	—	—	—	—
2016–17	Toronto Marlies	AHL	75	6	16	22	62	11	0	1	1	8
2017–18	Tucson Roadrunners	AHL	60	2	4	6	44	9	1	3	4	6
2018–19	Rockford IceHogs	AHL	64	3	5	8	50	—	—	—	—	—
NHL totals			42	0	2	2	12	—	—	—	—	—
