= Toronto Marlies =

American Hockey League team in Toronto, Ontario

- City: Toronto, Ontario
- League: American Hockey League
- Conference: Eastern
- Division: North
- Founded: 1978
- Home arena: Coca-Cola Coliseum; Scotiabank Arena (occasional home games)
- Colours: Blue, white
- Owner: Maple Leaf Sports & Entertainment
- General manager: Ryan Hardy
- Head coach: Steve Sullivan
- Captain: Logan Shaw
- Media: The Sports Network; Sportsnet 590; TSN 1050; AHL.TV (Internet)
- Affiliates: Toronto Maple Leafs (NHL); Cincinnati Cyclones (ECHL)

Franchise history
- 1978–1982: New Brunswick Hawks
- 1982–1986: St. Catharines Saints
- 1986–1991: Newmarket Saints
- 1991–2005: St. John's Maple Leafs
- 2005–present: Toronto Marlies

Championships
- Regular season titles: 2 (2015–16, 2017–18)
- Division titles: 7 (2007–08, 2011–12, 2012–13, 2013–14, 2015–16, 2017–18, 2022–23)
- Conference titles: 3 (2012, 2018, 2026)
- Calder Cups: 2 (2018, 2026)

Current uniform

The Toronto Marlies are a professional ice hockey team based in Toronto. They compete in the American Hockey League (AHL) as a member of the North Division of the Eastern Conference. The Marlies are owned by Maple Leaf Sports & Entertainment, a company that owns several professional sports teams in the city, including their NHL affiliate, the Toronto Maple Leafs. The Marlies have played their home games at Coca-Cola Coliseum since 2005.

The Marlies were established as the New Brunswick Hawks in 1978. The team relocated three times, to St. Catharines, Newmarket, and St. John's, before relocating to Toronto in 2005. As a part of its relocation to Toronto, the team was renamed the Marlies, after the Toronto Marlboros, a junior hockey team formerly sponsored by the Maple Leafs. The Marlies have advanced to the Calder Cup Finals in 2012, 2018, and 2026, with the Marlies having won the latter contests over the Texas Stars, in 2018, and Chicago Wolves, in 2026.

== History ==
The Marlies trace their history back to the New Brunswick Hawks, which were founded in 1978 as the first professional ice hockey team in New Brunswick, and were jointly operated by the Maple Leafs and Chicago Black Hawks as a farm team. Maple Leaf Gardens Limited (MLGL) and the Black Hawks each owned half of the franchise.

The Hawks played until 1982 when they relocated to St. Catharines, Ontario as the St. Catharines Saints, this time as a sole Leafs affiliate; the Hawks had opted to affiliate with the Springfield Indians. After four seasons, the team moved to Newmarket, Ontario as the Newmarket Saints, where they played for five seasons before moving to St. John's, Newfoundland and Labrador as the St. John's Maple Leafs, the first professional ice hockey team in Newfoundland and Labrador. The team played their home games at Memorial Stadium until 2001, when they moved to Mile One Centre.

The AHL had a strong presence in Atlantic Canada in the 1980s and 1990s. However, after the turn of the millennium, NHL teams sought to have their AHL affiliates located geographically closer to their parent clubs in order to ease the movement of players between the minors and the NHL. By 2004, St. John's was the only remaining team in the region. Although the team was extremely popular and had excellent attendance, the parent Maple Leafs wanted to cut back on escalating travel costs. By the time of the team's final season in Newfoundland, their nearest opponent was the Portland Pirates, 1,781 km (1,107 mi) away. Additionally, Ricoh Coliseum (formerly CNE Coliseum and now Coca-Cola Coliseum) had recently been renovated for hockey use, and the NHL Leafs were looking to place a team there. The Coliseum had been home to the Toronto Roadrunners, top affiliate of the Edmonton Oilers, in the 2003–04 season. These factors resulted in the team's relocation to Toronto for the 2005–06 season.

The team is named after the former Toronto Marlboros, a junior hockey team that played in Toronto from 1904 to 1989, the last 62 years of that time under common ownership with the Leafs. The team was long known as the "Marlies" to fans and media alike. To avoid any potential association with the similarly named cigarette brand, MLSE uses the abbreviated form as the team's official nickname.

During the 2011–12 AHL season, the Marlies advanced to the Calder Cup Finals, the deepest playoff run for a Toronto-based team since the Leafs won the Stanley Cup in 1967. They lost to the Norfolk Admirals in a four-game sweep.

In 2015–16 season, the Marlies moved from the Western Conference to the Eastern Conference due to the relocation of five teams to California.

The Marlies have competed against Ontario rivals the Belleville Senators, in the "Battle of the 401" or "Battle of Ontario" since the 2017–18 season.

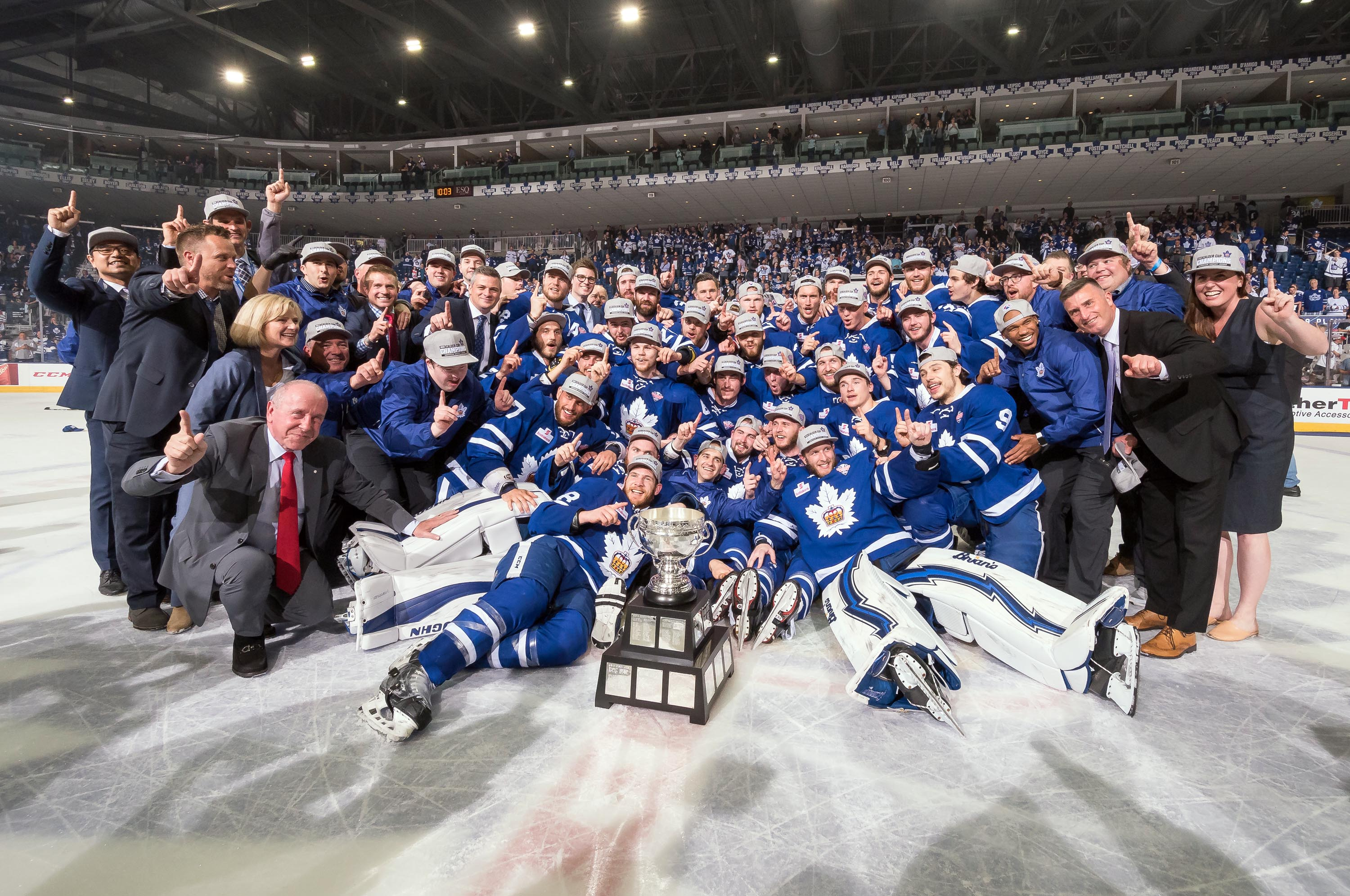
The Marlies with the Calder Cup, the club's first after defeating the Texas Stars in the 2018 Calder Cup Final.

During the 2017–18 AHL season, the Marlies won their first Calder Cup after a 4–3 series win over the Texas Stars in the finals. It was the first professional hockey title for a Toronto-based team since 1967.

== Team information ==
=== Logo ===
The Toronto Marlies' primary colours are blue and white, which is used in the team's logo. The present logo for the Marlies, introduced in 2016, is based on the Toronto Marlboros' logo. The Marlboros were a junior ice hockey team that was formerly sponsored by Maple Leaf Gardens Limited.

=== Broadcast information ===
All regular season home games, as well as all home and away playoff games air on AHL.TV, with Todd Crocker as the play-by-play announcer. Select games such as playoff games are also simulcast on The Sports Network.

== Season-by-season results ==
This is a partial list of the past five seasons completed by the Marlies. For the full season-by-season history, see List of Toronto Marlies seasons

Calder Cup champions	Conference champions	Division champions	League leader

Records as of the end of the 2025–26 regular season.

Regular season											Playoffs					
Season	Games	Won	Lost	OTL	SOL	Points	PCT	Goals for	Goals against	Standing	Year	Prelims	1st round	2nd round	3rd round	Finals
2021–22	72	37	30	4	1	79	.549	243	244	6th, North	2022	Did not qualify				
2022–23	72	42	24	4	2	90	.625	229	225	1st, North	2023	BYE	W, 3–1, UTI	L, 0–3, ROC	—	—
2023–24	72	34	26	10	2	80	.556	249	220	5th, North	2024	L, 1–2, BEL	—	—	—	—
2024–25	72	37	23	4	8	86	.597	209	197	4th, North	2025	L, 0–2, CLE	—	—	—	—
2025–26	72	36	26	5	5	82	.569	229	228	4th, North	2026	W, 2–1, ROC	W, 3–2, LAV	W, 3–2, CLE	W, 4–2, WBS	W, 4–1, CHI
Totals	1544	826	544	92	82	1826	.562	4798	4480			15 playoff appearances				

_{[1]}-Indicates league leading: most shootout losses

_{[2]}-Indicates league leading: fewest losses

_{[3]}-Indicates league leading: fewest goals against

== Players ==
=== Current roster ===
Updated October 28, 2026.

No.	Nat	Player	Pos	S/G	Age	Acquired	Birthplace	Contract
70	(Russia)	Artur Akhtyamov	G	L	25	2024	Kazan, Russia	Maple Leafs
80	(Canada)	Ken Appleby	G	L	31	2025	North Bay, Ontario	Marlies
68	(United States)	Matthew Barbolini	LW	L	26	2024	Williamsville, New York	Marlies
25	(United States)	Vincent Borgesi	D	R	22	2026	Philadelphia, Pennsylvania	Maple Leafs
56	(United States)	Sawyer Boulton	RW	R	22	2026	Huntington, New York	Marlies
90	(United States)	Brendan Brisson	LW	L	25	2026	Manhattan Beach, California	Maple Leafs
58	(Canada)	Noah Chadwick	D	L	21	2024	Saskatoon, Saskatchewan	Maple Leafs
38	(Canada)	Ben Danford	D	R	20	2025	Madoc, Ontario	Maple Leafs
37	(Canada)	Luke Haymes	C	L	23	2025	Ottawa, Ontario	Maple Leafs
31	(Slovakia)	Samuel Hlavaj	G	L	25	2026	Martin, Slovakia	Maple Leafs
98	(Czech Republic)	Miroslav Holinka	C	R	21	2026	Kromeriz, Czech Republic	Maple Leafs
62	(United States)	Hayes Hundley	D	R	21	2026	Upper Arlington, Ohio	Maple Leafs
65	(Canada)	Reese Johnson (A)	C	R	28	2025	Regina, Saskatchewan	Marlies
57	(United States)	Marc Johnstone	RW/C	R	30	2025	Cranford, New Jersey	Marlies
86	(United States)	Ben Meehan	D	L	25	2026	Boston, Massachusetts	Marlies
51	(Canada)	Philippe Myers	D	R	29	2024	Moncton, New Brunswick	Maple Leafs
61	(Canada)	Michael Pezzetta	LW	L	28	2025	Toronto, Ontario	Maple Leafs
26	(Finland)	Aatu Räty	C	L	24	2026	Oulunsalo, Finland	Maple Leafs
54	(Canada)	Henrik Rybinski	RW	R	25	2026	Vancouver, British Columbia	Maple Leafs
11	(Canada)	Logan Shaw (C)	RW	R	34	2022	Glace Bay, Nova Scotia	Marlies
42	(Canada)	Landon Sim	C	L	22	2025	New Glasgow, Nova Scotia	Maple Leafs
59	(Canada)	Blake Smith	D	L	21	2025	Oshawa, Ontario	Maple Leafs
67	(Canada)	Sam Stevens	C	L	26	2024	Montreal, Quebec	Marlies
77	(Canada)	Ryan Tverberg	C	R	24	2023	Richmond Hill, Ontario	Maple Leafs
39	(United States)	Borya Valis	RW	R	22	2025	Denver, Colorado	Maple Leafs
52	(United States)	Cade Webber	D	L	25	2024	Meadville, Pennsylvania	Maple Leafs

=== Team captains ===
- Marc Moro, 2005–2007
- Ben Ondrus, 2007–2010
- Alex Foster, 2010–11
- Ryan Hamilton, 2011–2013
- Trevor Smith, 2013–2015
- Troy Bodie, 2015
- Andrew Campbell, 2015–2017
- Ben Smith, 2018
- Richard Clune, 2021–2022
- Logan Shaw, 2022–present

=== American Hockey League Hall of Famers ===
AHL Hall of Fame Honored Members
Name	Seasons	Induction Year
Keith Aucoin	2012-13 (player)	2022
Chris Bourque	2026- (asst. GM)	2026

=== Notable alumni ===
The following players have played both 100 games with the Marlies and 100 games in the National Hockey League:

- Joey Anderson
- Bates Battaglia
- Joseph Blandisi
- Connor Brown
- Sam Carrick
- Richard Clune
- Joe Colborne
- Matt Frattin
- Frederik Gauthier
- Colin Greening
- Jay Harrison
- Justin Holl
- Korbinian Holzer
- Andreas Johnsson
- Nazem Kadri
- Kasperi Kapanen
- Brendan Leipsic
- Josh Leivo
- Timothy Liljegren
- Mason Marchment
- Greg McKegg
- Brendan Mikkelson
- John Mitchell
- Trevor Moore
- Jiri Tlusty
- Michael Zigomanis

== Head coaches ==
The Marlies have employed eight head coaches. Sheldon Keefe has the franchise's highest winning percentage at .672 across 319 games coached from the 2015 to 2019 seasons, prior to being promoted to the NHL as head coach of the Toronto Maple Leafs. The following day, Keefe signed a three-year contract with the Maple Leafs.\ On December 1, 2019, Greg Moore was named as head coach of the Marlies, replacing Keefe. Moore recorded the lowest winning percentage (.538) among coaches who served more than one full season, guiding the team in 213 games during his tenure. Moore was relieved of his duties in May 2023, replaced by John Gruden in July 2023.

Legend:

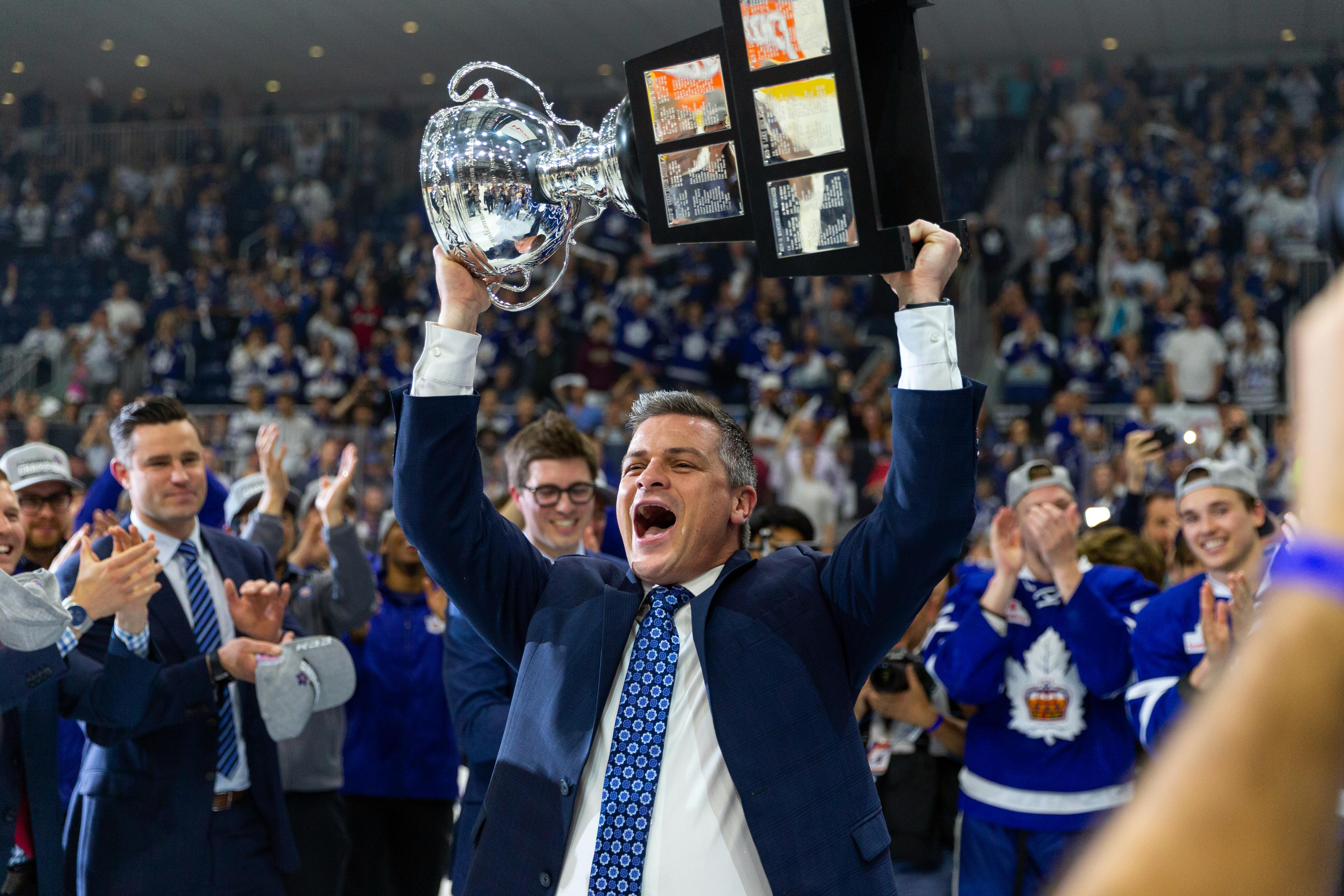
Sheldon Keefe with the Calder Cup after the 2018 Calder Cup Final

GC	Games coached
W	Wins
L	Losses
T	Ties
OT	Overtime/shootout losses
Win%	Winning percentage
	Spent entire AHL head coaching career with the Marlies

Note: Highest figures are highlighted in bold.

Name	Tenure	Regular season					Playoffs				Notes	References
Name	Tenure	GC	W	L	T/OT	Win%	GC	W	L	Win%	Notes	References
Paul Maurice	2005–2006	80	41	29	10	.575	5	1	4	.200		
Greg Gilbert	2006–2009	240	123	89	28	.571	25	11	14	.440		
Dallas Eakins	2009–2013	312	157	**114**	**41**	.569	25	16	10	.615		
Steve Spott	2013–2014	76	45	25	6	.632	14	10	4	**.714**		
Gord Dineen	2014–2015	76	40	27	9	.586	5	2	3	.400		
Sheldon Keefe	2015–2019	**319**	**199**	89	31	**.672**	**59**	**38**	**21**	.644	Won first Calder Cup in team history (2018). Left to become head coach of the Toronto Maple Leafs.	
Greg Moore	2019–2023	213	107	91	15	.538	7	3	4	.429		
John Gruden	2023–2026	216	107	75	34	.495	29	17	12	.586	Won second Calder Cup in team history (2026). Left to become assistant coach of the Toronto Maple Leafs.	

Note: Statistics are correct through the 2025–26 season.

== Team records ==
=== Single season ===
- Goals: John Pohl, 36 (2005–06); Alex Steeves, 36 (2024–25)
- Assists: Jeremy Bracco, 57 (2018–19)
- Points: Tim Stapleton, 79 (2008–09); Jeremy Bracco, 79 (2018–19)
- Penalty minutes: Andre Deveaux, 216 (2009–10)
- Point streak: Spencer Abbott, 13 (Oct. 6, 2013 – Nov. 16, 2013)
- GAA: (Note: Goaltending records need a minimum 25 games played by the goaltender.) Garret Sparks, 1.79 (2017–18)
- SV%: Garret Sparks, .936 (2017–18)
- Wins: Garret Sparks, 31 (2017–18)
- Shutouts: Garret Sparks, 6 (2017–18)

=== Career ===
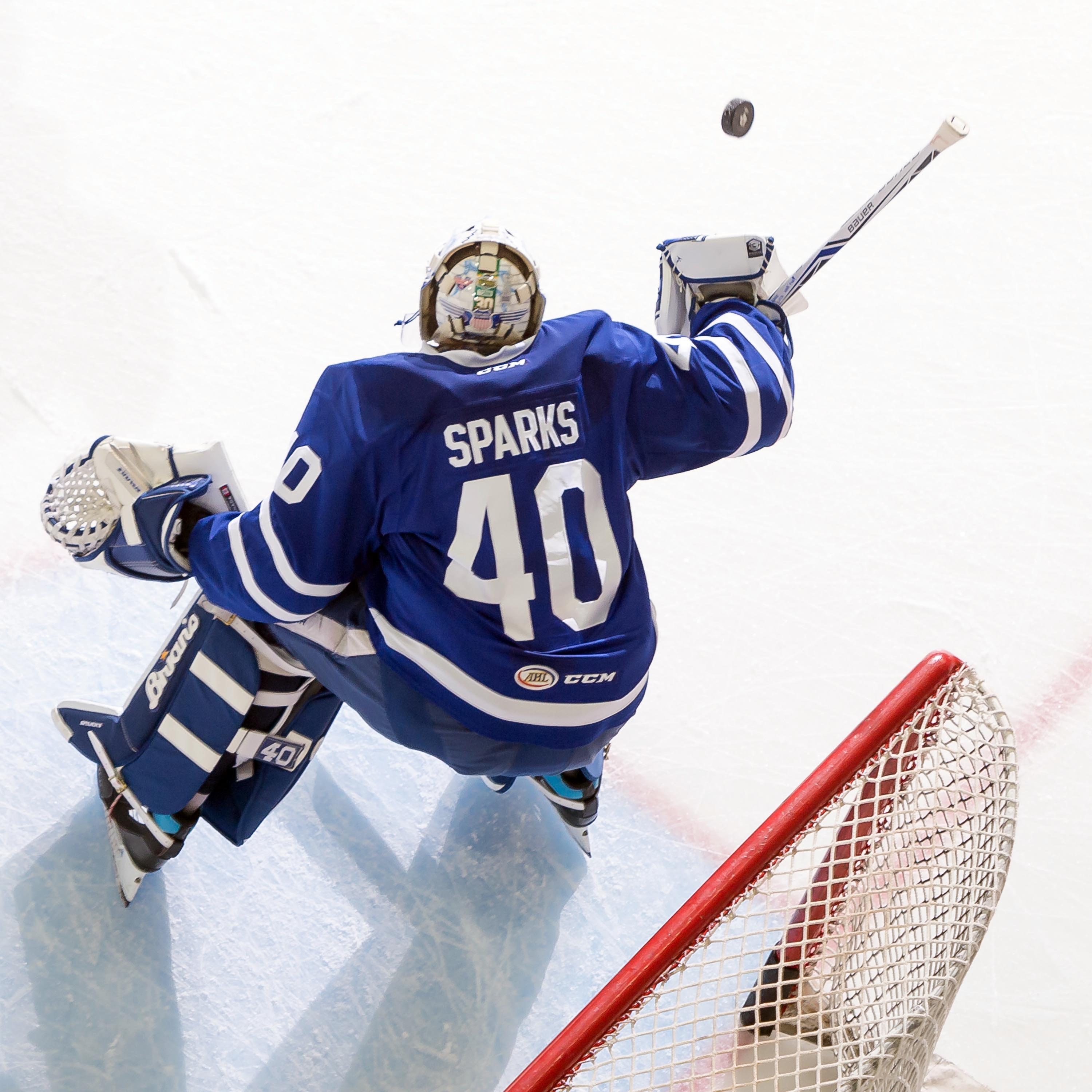
Recording 15 shutouts with the Marlies, Garret Sparks holds the franchise all-time shutout record with the team.

- Career goals: Alex Steeves, 105
- Career assists: Logan Shaw, 137
- Career points: Logan Shaw, 223
- Career penalty Minutes: Richard Clune, 510
- Career goaltending wins: Garret Sparks, 80
- Career shutouts: Garret Sparks, 15
- Career games: Alex Foster, 312

=== Other records and firsts ===
- First game: October 7, 2005. Rochester Americans 8, Marlies 5
- First home game and first win: October 12, 2005. Marlies 5, Syracuse Crunch 2.
- First goal: October 7, 2005. Rochester Americans 8, Marlies 5. Goal scored by Colin Murphy
- First shutout: December 14, 2005. Jean-Sebastien Aubin. Marlies 5, Grand Rapids Griffins 0.
- First hat trick: January 2, 2006. Luke Fulghum. Marlies 6, Cleveland Barons 1.
- Most goals scored in a game: 10 (twice): February 8, 2009. Marlies 10, Grand Rapids Griffins 5. February 27, 2016. Marlies 10, Rochester Americans 5.

== See also ==
- List of ice hockey teams in Ontario
