= Richard Clune =

Canadian ice hockey player (born 1987)

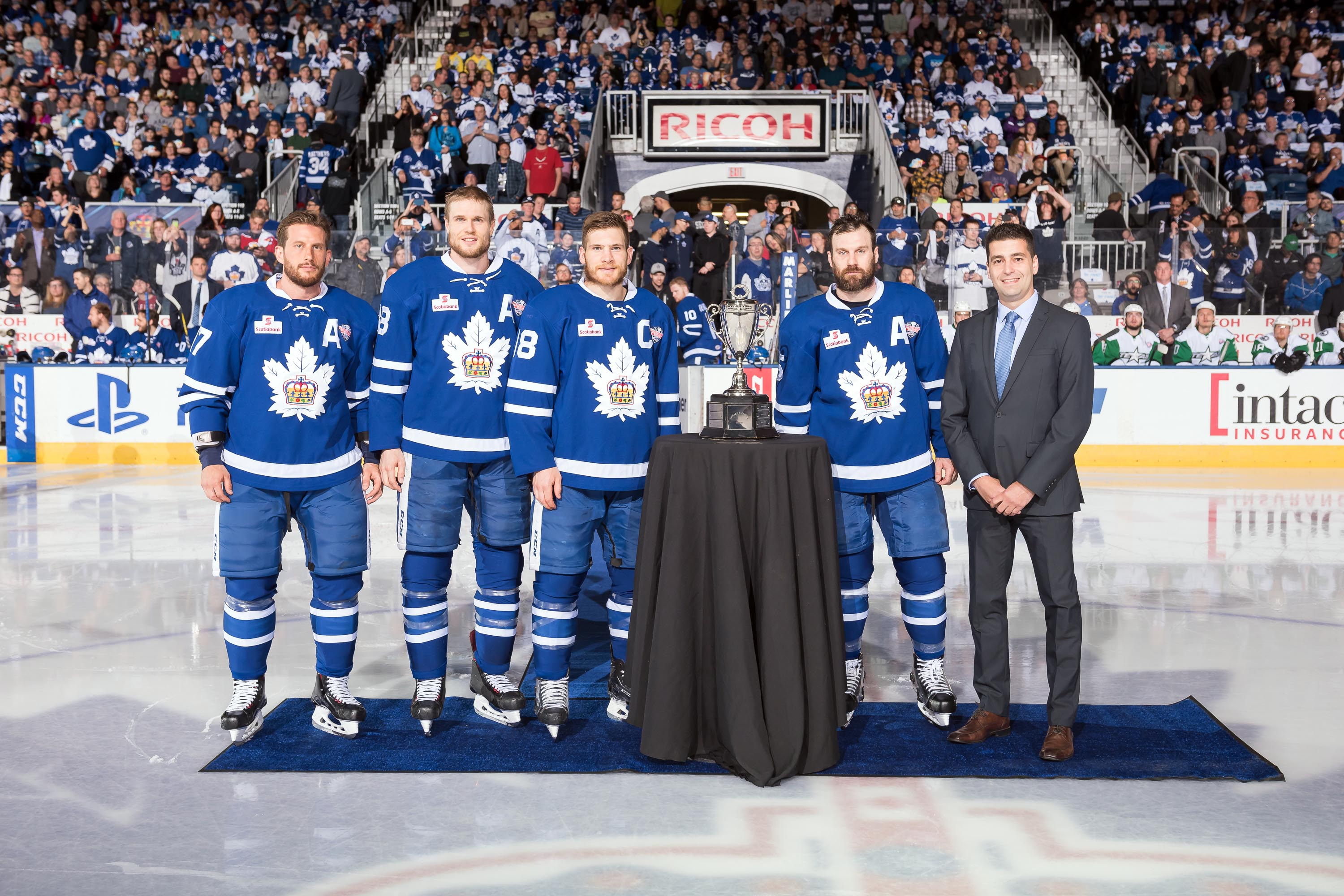
- Clune with the Toronto Marlies in 2018
- Born: April 25, 1987 (age 39) Toronto, Ontario, Canada
- Height: 5 ft 10 in (178 cm)
- Weight: 216 lb (98 kg; 15 st 6 lb)
- Position: Left wing
- Shot: Left
- Played for: Los Angeles Kings; Nashville Predators; Toronto Maple Leafs
- NHL draft: 71st overall, 2005; Dallas Stars
- Playing career: 2007–2022

Richard Clune, also known as 'Rich' or 'Dicky', (born April 25, 1987) is a Canadian former professional ice hockey left winger and is an assistant coach of the Pittsburgh Penguins. Clune played in 423 AHL games and 139 National Hockey League (NHL) games during his career.

== Playing career ==
=== Junior ===
Clune was drafted in the second round of the 2003 Ontario Hockey League (OHL) Priority Selection (29th overall) by the Sarnia Sting. During the 2003–04 season, Clune scored three goals and 16 points in 58 games. In 2004–05, his second year with the Sting, Clune finished the season with 21 goals and 34 points in 68 games, fourth most on the team, as well as winning the Bobby Smith Trophy, emblematic of the OHL's scholastic player of the year. In April 2005, Clune represented Canada at the World Under-18s in the Czech Republic; Canada won a silver medal, losing in the gold-medal game to the United States.

In the 2005–06 season Clune was named Sarnia's team captain. At the end of the season, he demanded a trade. On September 20, 2006, Clune was traded to the Barrie Colts for Mike Roelofsen and three draft picks. Clune had his best season offensively, scoring a career-high 32 goals and 46 assists for a career-best 78 points in 67 games.

=== Professional ===
Clune was drafted in the third round (71st overall) at the 2005 NHL entry draft by the Dallas Stars on July 30, 2005. On March 25, 2007, Clune signed a three-year entry-level contract with Dallas Stars. Clune was invited to the Stars' 2007 training camp, but was re-assigned to Dallas's American Hockey League (AHL) affiliate, the Iowa Stars, on September 21. Clune ended the 2007–08 season splitting time between Iowa and the Idaho Steelheads of the ECHL.

On July 21, 2008, he was traded to the Los Angeles Kings in exchange for Lauri Tukonen. After suffering a chest injury at training camp on October 6, 2008, Clune was not assigned to the Kings' affiliate, the Manchester Monarchs, until November 19, 2008. The following season, Clune started the season on injured reserve with the Kings after suffering a groin pull. After being activated, he was assigned to Manchester on October 9, 2009. He was recalled in February 2010 and played in his first NHL game for the Kings versus the Edmonton Oilers on February 11. In his second game, he scored two points versus the Colorado Avalanche. He was returned to Manchester on February 16. During the 2010 playoffs, Clune made four brief appearances in their first-round loss to the Vancouver Canucks, but is noted for his fight in Game 5 with Rick Rypien. In the off-season Clune re-signed with the Kings to a one-year contract. He spent the entire 2011–12 season with the Monarchs, registering 6 goals and 15 points in 56 games. Clune re-signed with the Kings to a two-year contract.

Prior to the 2012–13 lockout-shortened season, Clune was picked up off waivers from the Kings by the Nashville Predators on January 15, 2013. Clune played in his 100th NHL game on March 1, 2014 versus the Winnipeg Jets. Having established a fourth line role with the Predators, Clune was re-signed to a two-year contract extension to begin in the 2014–15 season. Clune featured in a single game under new head coach Peter Laviolette before he was reassigned to the AHL with affiliate the Milwaukee Admirals for the duration of the year. After he was placed on waivers in the off-season with no claim, Clune was placed on unconditional waivers to buy out the final year of his contract and secure a release to free agency on June 27, 2015.

On July 5, 2015, Clune signed a one-year contract with the Toronto Marlies of the AHL. Clune produced 5 points in 8 games to open the 2015–16 season with the Marlies, before he was signed to a one-year two-way contract with the parent club, the Toronto Maple Leafs, on October 29, 2015. On July 4, 2016, as a free agent from the Maple Leafs, Clune opted to continue playing with the Marlies, signing a new one-year AHL deal. On March 1, 2021, Clune was named team captain of the Marlies. Clune played seven seasons with the Marlies, captaining the club in his final two years, before announcing his retirement from his 16 year professional career on August 4, 2022. It was announced that Clune would remain within the Toronto Maple Leafs organization as a member of the player development staff.

Clune was named an assistant coach of the Anaheim Ducks in 2024.

== Personal life ==
Clune grew up in the Beaches area of Toronto, Ontario, Where he played at Ted Reeve Arena. His father, Tom Clune, played college hockey in the United States before making a career of it in Europe. During the 2014–15 season, Clune began taking acting classes. In the 2017 offseason, he filmed roles in two short films. His younger brothers, Matt and Ben, are screenwriters. Clune's great-uncle was Robert Clune, a bishop in the Archdiocese of Toronto.

Clune is of Irish and southern Italian descent. He has written of his struggle with substance addiction. A documentary feature on his life was released in 2020.

== Career statistics ==
=== Regular season and playoffs ===
| | | | Regular season | | | | | Playoffs |
| Season | Team | League | GP | G | A | Pts | PIM | GP | G | A | Pts | PIM |
|---|---|---|---|---|---|---|---|---|---|---|---|---|
| 2003–04 | Sarnia Sting | OHL | 58 | 3 | 13 | 16 | 72 | 5 | 0 | 1 | 1 | 0 |
| 2004–05 | Sarnia Sting | OHL | 67 | 21 | 13 | 34 | 103 | — | — | — | — | — |
| 2005–06 | Sarnia Sting | OHL | 61 | 20 | 32 | 52 | 126 | — | — | — | — | — |
| 2006–07 | Barrie Colts | OHL | 67 | 32 | 46 | 78 | 151 | 8 | 3 | 4 | 7 | 8 |
| 2006–07 | Iowa Stars | AHL | 1 | 0 | 0 | 0 | 2 | — | — | — | — | — |
| 2007–08 | Idaho Steelheads | ECHL | 19 | 1 | 9 | 10 | 41 | — | — | — | — | — |
| 2007–08 | Iowa Stars | AHL | 38 | 3 | 5 | 8 | 137 | — | — | — | — | — |
| 2008–09 | Manchester Monarchs | AHL | 35 | 3 | 6 | 9 | 87 | — | — | — | — | — |
| 2009–10 | Manchester Monarchs | AHL | 44 | 4 | 10 | 14 | 126 | — | — | — | — | — |
| 2009–10 | Los Angeles Kings | NHL | 14 | 0 | 2 | 2 | 26 | 4 | 0 | 0 | 0 | 5 |
| 2010–11 | Manchester Monarchs | AHL | 66 | 8 | 14 | 22 | 222 | 7 | 0 | 3 | 3 | 6 |
| 2011–12 | Manchester Monarchs | AHL | 56 | 6 | 9 | 15 | 253 | 4 | 0 | 0 | 0 | 14 |
| 2012–13 | Manchester Monarchs | AHL | 35 | 2 | 5 | 7 | 98 | — | — | — | — | — |
| 2012–13 | Nashville Predators | NHL | 47 | 4 | 5 | 9 | 113 | — | — | — | — | — |
| 2013–14 | Nashville Predators | NHL | 58 | 3 | 4 | 7 | 166 | — | — | — | — | — |
| 2014–15 | Nashville Predators | NHL | 1 | 0 | 0 | 0 | 0 | — | — | — | — | — |
| 2014–15 | Milwaukee Admirals | AHL | 62 | 6 | 11 | 17 | 181 | — | — | — | — | — |
| 2015–16 | Toronto Marlies | AHL | 49 | 8 | 16 | 24 | 146 | 15 | 1 | 2 | 3 | 34 |
| 2015–16 | Toronto Maple Leafs | NHL | 19 | 0 | 4 | 4 | 22 | — | — | — | — | — |
| 2016–17 | Toronto Marlies | AHL | 37 | 3 | 7 | 10 | 87 | 5 | 1 | 1 | 2 | 14 |
| 2017–18 | Toronto Marlies | AHL | 47 | 3 | 1 | 4 | 75 | — | — | — | — | — |
| 2018–19 | Toronto Marlies | AHL | 15 | 1 | 0 | 1 | 14 | — | — | — | — | — |
| 2019–20 | Toronto Marlies | AHL | 16 | 3 | 1 | 4 | 28 | — | — | — | — | — |
| 2020–21 | Toronto Marlies | AHL | 33 | 3 | 1 | 4 | 50 | — | — | — | — | — |
| 2021–22 | Toronto Marlies | AHL | 59 | 4 | 8 | 12 | 110 | — | — | — | — | — |
| AHL totals | | | 593 | 57 | 94 | 151 | 1616 | 31 | 2 | 6 | 8 | 68 |
| NHL totals | | | 139 | 7 | 15 | 22 | 327 | 4 | 0 | 0 | 0 | 5 |

=== International ===
| Year | Team | Event | GP | G | A | Pts | PIM |
|---|---|---|---|---|---|---|---|
| 2004 | Canada Ontario | U17 | 6 | 1 | 8 | 9 | 6 |
| 2004 | Canada | IH18 | 5 | 0 | 1 | 1 | 33 |
| 2005 | Canada | U18 | 6 | 2 | 2 | 4 | 12 |
| Junior totals | | | 17 | 3 | 11 | 14 | 51 |

== Awards and honours ==
| Award | Year |
|---|---|
OHL
| Bobby Smith Trophy | 2005 |
AHL
| Calder Cup (Toronto Marlies) | 2018 |
